= List of German child actors =

This is a list of child actors from Germany. Films and/or television series they appeared in are mentioned only if they were still a child at the time of filming.

Current child actors (under the age of eighteen) are indicated by boldface.

== A ==
- Elke Aberle (born 1950)
  - 1955: Children, Mother, and the General
  - 1956: Love
  - 1957: Widower with Five Daughters
  - 1958: Grabenplatz 17
  - 1958: Ooh … diese Ferien
  - 1958: Bimbo the Great
  - 1958: Ludmila
  - 1958: Father, Mother and Nine Children
  - 1959: Mein ganzes Herz ist voll Musik
  - 1959: Jons und Erdme
  - 1960: Big Request Concert
  - 1961: What Is Father Doing in Italy?
  - 1964: Das Lamm
  - 1965: Mädchen hinter Gittern
  - 1966: Betty Blue
  - 1967: Das Kriminalmuseum: Die Kiste
- Adriana Altaras (born 1960)
  - 1964: Nikoletina Bursać
- Michael Ande (born 1944)
  - 1955: Marianne of My Youth
  - 1955: Reaching for the Stars
  - 1955: Ich weiß, wofür ich lebe
  - 1956: Holiday in Tyrol
  - 1956: Das Hirtenlied vom Kaisertal
  - 1956: The Trapp Family
  - 1956: Die Stimme der Sehnsucht
  - 1957: El Hakim
  - 1957: Scandal in Bad Ischl
  - 1957: Der schönste Tag meines Lebens
  - 1957: Die Prinzessin von St. Wolfgang
  - 1958: The Trapp Family in America
  - 1958: Don Vesuvio und das Haus der Strolche
  - 1958: The Doctor of Stalingrad
  - 1958: Majestät auf Abwegen
  - 1959: When the Bells Sound Clearly
  - 1962: Little Lord Fauntleroy
- Helga Anders (1948–1986)
  - 1962: Peter Pan
  - 1962: Max the Pickpocket
  - 1962: Bubusch
  - 1962: Die sündigen Engel
  - 1964: Willy Reichert in... (2 episodes)
  - 1964: Sie schreiben mit – Das Sparschwein
  - 1965: Die Bräute meiner Söhne (2 episodes)
  - 1965: Die Unverbesserlichen
  - 1965–1966: Der Forellenhof (8 episodes)
  - 1966: Congress of Love
  - 1966: Das Cello
  - 1966: Die Unverbesserlichen – Nichts dazugelernt
  - 1966: 00Sex am Wolfgangsee
  - 1966: How to Seduce a Playboy
- Carmen-Maja Antoni (born 1945)
  - 1959: Der Dieb im Warenhaus
- Daniel Axt (born 1991)
  - 2006: Krimi.de: Die Gang
  - 2007: Der Neue (short film)
  - 2008: Die Brücke
  - 2008: Le Camping
  - 2009: Krimi.de (2 episodes)

== B ==
- Karin Baal (1940-2024)
  - 1956: Teenage Wolfpack
  - 1957: Tired Theodore
  - 1957: The Heart of St. Pauli
  - 1957: Jede Nacht in einem anderen Bett
  - 1958: Rosemary
  - 1958: Iron Gustav
- Patrick Bach (born 1968)
  - 1981: Silas
  - 1982: Jack Holborn
  - 1984: Drei und eine halbe Portion
- Meret Becker (born 1969)
  - 1980: Kaltgestellt
  - 1980: Der Mond scheint auf Kylenamoe
  - 1986: Der Prinz
- Leonie Benesch (born 1991)
  - 2007: Beautiful Bitch
  - 2009: The White Ribbon
- Jamie Bick (born 2000)
  - 2006: Stolberg – Vaterliebe
  - 2008-2012: Alarm for Cobra 11 – The Highway Police (3 episodes)
  - 2009: Ob ihr wollt oder nicht
  - 2012: Yoko
  - 2012: Unter Frauen
  - 2012: online – meine Tochter in Gefahr
  - 2012: Vampire Sisters
  - 2013: Da geht noch was
  - 2013: Inga Lindström – Herz aus Eis
  - 2014: Vampire Sisters 2: Bats in the Belly
  - 2014: SOKO Köln – Vater und Söhne
  - 2014: Kaktus und Mimose
  - 2015: Let’s talk – Weil Meinung zählt
  - 2015: Leipzig Homicide – Bilder im Kopf
  - 2015: Die Truckerin
  - 2016: Anne Frank's Diary
  - 2016: Tatverdacht – Leichte Beute
  - 2016: Ich gehöre ihm
  - 2016: Vampire Sisters 3: Journey to Transylvania
  - 2016: Herzensbrecher – Vater von vier Söhnen (4 episodes)
  - 2016: Schatz nimm du sie!
  - 2017: In aller Freundschaft – Die jungen Ärzte – Herzensdinge
  - 2017: Bettys Diagnose – Verletzte Gefühle
  - 2017: SOKO Köln – Die Räuber
  - 2018: Tatverdacht – Hilferuf
- Moritz Bleibtreu (born 1971)
  - 1982: Neues aus Uhlenbusch
  - 1986: Mit meinen heißen Tränen
- Jessica Boehrs (born 1980)
  - 1995: Die Kreuzfahrt
  - 1996: Der Bulle von Tölz: Tod am Altar
  - 1998: Julia – Kämpfe für deine Träume!
- Uwe Bohm (1962–2022)
  - 1973: Ich kann auch ’ne Arche bauen
  - 1976: Nordsee ist Mordsee
  - 1978: Moritz, Dear Moritz
  - 1980: Im Herzen des Hurrican
- Curt Bois (1901–1991)
  - 1907: Bauernhaus und Grafenschloß (Short)
  - 1908: Der fidele Bauer – 1. Terzett: Ein Infant'rist, ein Artill'rist (Short)
  - 1908: Der fidele Bauer – 2. Terzett: Bauernmarsch (Short)
  - 1908: Der fidele Bauer – 3. Duettino zwischen Liesl und Heinerle (Short)
  - 1909: Der kleine Detektiv (Short)
  - 1909: Mutterliebe (Short)
  - 1909: Klebolin klebt alles (Short)
  - 1912: Ein neuer Erwerbszweig (Short)
  - 1913: Des Pfarrers Töchterlein (The Minister's Daughter) (Short)
  - 1914: Das Geschenk des Inders
  - 1916: Streichhölzer, kauft Streichhölzer!
  - 1916: BZ-Maxe & Co.
  - 1916: Bobby als Amor
  - 1916: Tante Röschen will heiraten
  - 1917: Die Spinne
  - 1917: Abenteuer im Warenhaus (Short)
  - 1917: Das Klima am Vaucourt
  - 1917: Das Unruhige Hotel
  - 1918: Der Dieb
  - 1918: Der goldene Pol
  - 1918: Der Gast aus der vierten Dimension
  - 1918: So'n kleiner Schwerenöter (Short)
- Radost Bokel (born 1975)
  - 1986: Momo
  - 1986: Please, Let the Flowers Live
  - 1986: Valhalla (voice)
  - 1988: The Secret of the Sahara (4 episodes)
  - 1989: Rivalen der Rennbahn
  - 1989: Das Nest
  - 1989: Schuldig
  - 1989: Tatort – Herzversagen
  - 1990: Falsche Spuren
  - 1991: Weißblaue Geschichten (3 episodes)
  - 1991: Eine Frau in den allerbesten Jahren: Meeresbrise
  - 1993: Glückliche Reise – Dominikanische Republik
- Michael Böllner (born 1958)
  - 1971: Willy Wonka & the Chocolate Factory
- Peter Bosse (1931–2018)
  - 1935: Forget Me Not
  - 1935: All Because of the Dog
  - 1936: The Haunted Castle
  - 1936: Schlußakkord
  - 1936: Das Gäßchen zum Paradies
  - 1937: Woman's Love—Woman's Suffering
  - 1937: Immer nur du
  - 1938: The Woman at the Crossroads
  - 1939: Robert and Bertram
- Hermann Braun (1917–1945)
  - 1933: Hitlerjunge Quex
  - 1933: Der Jäger aus Kurpfalz
  - 1934: Holiday From Myself
  - 1934: Punks kommt aus Amerika
  - 1935: Achte mir auf aufs Gakeki (short film)
- Aglaja Brix (born 1990)
  - 1999: Doppelter Einsatz – Die Todfreundin
  - 1999-2005: Die Pfefferkörner (52 episodes)
- Daniel Brühl (born 1978)
  - 1994: Sven's Secret
  - 1995: Verbotene Liebe (16 episodes)
  - 1996: Der Pakt – Wenn Kinder töten
- Heidi Brühl (1942–1991)
  - 1954: The Last Summer
  - 1954: The Country Schoolmaster
  - 1955: The Immenhof Girls
  - 1955: Roman einer Siebzehnjährigen
  - 1956: Hochzeit auf Immenhof
  - 1957: Ferien auf Immenhof
  - 1957: Confessions of Felix Krull
  - 1957: Vater, unser bestes Stück
  - 1957: Precocious Youth
  - 1958: Solang’ die Sterne glüh’n
  - 1958: Ooh … diese Ferien
  - 1958: Ohne Mutter geht es nicht
  - 1958: Man ist nur zweimal jung
  - 1959: Laß mich am Sonntag nicht allein
  - 1959: Crime After School
  - 1959: 2 × Adam, 1 × Eva
  - 1959: The Shepherd from Trutzberg
  - 1960: Hit Parade 1960
  - 1960: Schlagerraketen – Festival der Herzen
  - 1960: I Will Always Be Yours
  - 1960: The Hero of My Dreams
  - 1960: Freddy and the Melody of the Night
- Gedeon Burkhard (born 1969)
  - 1981: Tante Maria
  - 1981: ...und ab geht die Post! Briefträgergeschichten von gestern
  - 1982: Blood and Honor: Youth Under Hitler (1 episode)
  - 1983: Nordlichter: Geschichten zwischen Watt und Weltstadt
  - 1983: Wagen 106 (1 episode)
  - 1987: Empty World

== C ==
- Leonard Carow (born 1994)
  - 2004: Tatort: Große Liebe
  - 2004: Stauffenberg
  - 2004: Typisch Mann!
  - 2004: Mord am Meer
  - 2005: SOKO Wismar – Wikingergold
  - 2006: 30 Something
  - 2006: Unsere zehn Gebote – Gebot 5 – Du sollst nicht töten
  - 2007: Ich leih’ mir eine Familie
  - 2007: Löwenzahn – Blut – Rätselhafte Spuren
  - 2007: Tatort: Bevor es dunkel wird
  - 2008: Mondkalb
  - 2008: Polizeiruf 110 – Keiner schreit
  - 2008: Sklaven und Herren
  - 2011: Pigeons on the Roof
  - 2011: War Horse
  - 2012: Der Kriminalist – Magdalena
  - 2012: Und alle haben geschwiegen
  - 2012: Klinik am Alex – Leidenschaften
  - 2012: Stolberg – Klassenkampf
  - 2012: Tatort: Dinge, die noch zu tun sind
- Mathieu Carrière (born 1950)
  - 1964: Tonio Kröger
  - 1966: Young Törless
  - 1968: Gates to Paradise
- Nina Chuba (born 1998)
  - 2008-2010: Die Pfefferkörner (28 episodes)
  - 2010: Großstadtrevier – Liebeslügen
  - 2011: Arschkalt
  - 2012: Eine Hand wäscht die andere
  - 2015: Notruf Hafenkante – Stumme Angst
  - 2016: Dr. Klein – Überraschungen
- Henriette Confurius (born 1991)
  - 2001: Frauen, die Prosecco trinken
  - 2001: Die Meute der Erben
  - 2002: Ballett ist ausgefallen (short film)
  - 2002: Mein erstes Wunder
  - 2003: Nachmittag in Siedlisko (short film)
  - 2003: Polizeiruf 110 – Verloren
  - 2004: Bella Block: Das Gegenteil von Liebe
  - 2005: Ein starkes Team – Lebende Ziele
  - 2006: Show Time (short film)
  - 2006: Hilfe, meine Tochter heiratet
  - 2007: Der Novembermann
  - 2007: Tatort – Strahlende Zukunft
  - 2007: Notruf Hafenkante – Der verlorene Sohn
  - 2007: In aller Freundschaft – Wiedererweckte Gefühle
  - 2008: Das Geheimnis im Wald
  - 2009: The Countess
  - 2009: Die Wölfe
  - 2009: Ein Fall für zwei – Kleiner Satellit
  - 2009: Jenseits der Mauer
  - 2009: Ellas Geheimnis

== D ==
- Maria-Victoria Dragus (born 1994)
  - 2007: Ein Engel für alle – Die Entführung
  - 2007: Du bist nicht allein
  - 2007: Die Frau vom Checkpoint Charlie
  - 2008: Leipzig Homicide (2 episodes)
  - 2009: The White Ribbon
  - 2010: Dance Academy (4 episodes)
  - 2011: Familie Dr. Kleist – In letzter Minute
  - 2011: If Not Us, Who?
  - 2012: Kill Me
  - 2012: Summer Outside
  - 2012: Der Fall Jakob von Metzler

== E ==
- Sabine Eggerth (1943–2017)
  - 1953: Annaluise and Anton
  - 1953: The Little Match Girl
  - 1954: Maxie
  - 1955: His Daughter is Called Peter
  - 1956: As Long as the Roses Bloom
  - 1959: That's No Way to Land a Man
- Maria Ehrich (born 1993)
  - 2003: Die Hollies
  - 2004: My Brother Is a Dog
  - 2005: Eine Mutter für Anna
  - 2006: Dresden
  - 2006: Inga Lindström – In den Netzen der Liebe
  - 2007: Das Traumhotel – Indien
  - 2007: Rennschwein Rudi Rüssel 2 – Rudi rennt wieder!
  - 2007: Die Frau vom Checkpoint Charlie
  - 2008: Meine wunderbare Familie: Die zweite Chance
  - 2008: Meine wunderbare Familie: Einmal Ostsee und zurück
  - 2008: Ein Ferienhaus auf Ibiza
  - 2008: Inga Lindström – Sommer in Norrsunda
  - 2009: Ein Date fürs Leben
  - 2009: Danni Lowinski – Kein Heim
  - 2010: Rock It!
  - 2011: Ausgerechnet Sex!
  - 2011: SOKO Stuttgart – Wombats Ende
  - 2011: Doctor's Diary (3 episodes)
- Hannelore Elsner (1942-2019)
  - 1959: Immer die Mädchen
  - 1959: Freddy unter fremden Sternen
  - 1959: Old Heidelberg
  - 1960: Marina

== F ==
- Ruby O. Fee (born 1996)
  - 2010: Womb
  - 2010-2012: Allein gegen die Zeit
  - 2011: Löwenzahn – Das Kinoabenteuer
  - 2013: Lotta & die frohe Zukunft
  - 2013: Die schwarzen Brüder
  - 2013: Tatort: Happy Birthday, Sarah
  - 2013: Dead
  - 2014: Bibi & Tina
  - 2014: Kein Entkommen
  - 2014: Bibi & Tina: Voll verhext!
- Vijessna Ferkic (born 1987)
  - 1999: Stahlnetz – Die Zeugin
  - 1999-2003: Die Pfefferkörner (36 episodes)
  - 2003-2006: Alphateam – Die Lebensretter im OP (8 episodes)
  - 2004: Die Rettungsflieger – Rabenväter
  - 2005: Solo für Schwarz – Tod im See
  - 2005: Der Ermittler – Zahltag
- Elfie Fiegert (born 1946)
  - 1952: Toxi
  - 1953: Stars Over Colombo
  - 1955: The Dark Star
  - 1957: Two Bavarians in the Harem
  - 1961: Our Crazy Aunts
  - 1963: The House in Montevideo
  - 1964: Our Crazy Aunts in the South Seas
- Lotte Flack (born 1994)
  - 2006: Der Tote am Strand
  - 2007: Der Mann im Heuhaufen
  - 2007: Mütter Väter Kinder
  - 2007: Notruf Hafenkante – Die türkische Braut
  - 2009: Die Pfefferkörner – Falsche Freunde
  - 2009: Dornröschen
  - 2009: Pope Joan
  - 2010: Auch Lügen will gelernt sein
  - 2010: Der Mauerschütze
  - 2010: Bella Vita
  - 2011: Mitläufer (short film)
  - 2012: Tatort: Kinderland
  - 2012: Tatort: Ihr Kinderlein kommet
  - 2012: Bella Australia
  - 2012: Reiff für die Insel – Neubeginn
  - 2012: Polizeiruf 110: Eine andere Welt
- Pierre Franckh (born 1953)
  - 1962: Dicke Luft
  - 1962: Peter Pan
  - 1963: Besuch am Nachmittag
  - 1963: The House in Montevideo
  - 1964: Lausbubengeschichten
  - 1966: Spielplatz
  - 1968: Sie schreiben mit – Die Chauffeursmütze
  - 1969: Pepe, der Paukerschreck
  - 1969: Hurra, die Schule brennt!
  - 1970: Frisch, fromm, fröhlich, frei
  - 1970: Der Kommissar – ...wie die Wölfe
- Liv Lisa Fries (born 1990)
  - 2007: Schimanski: Tod in der Siedlung
  - 2008: Die Jagd nach dem Schatz der Nibelungen
  - 2008: The Wave
- Maria Furtwängler (born 1966)
  - 1974: Goodbye with Mums

== G ==
- Singa Gätgens (born 1975)
  - 1991-1993: Neues vom Süderhof (13 episodes)
  - 1992: Der Landarzt (2 episodes)
- Sonja Gerhardt (born 1989)
  - 2006-2007: Schmetterlinge im Bauch (6 episodes)
- François Goeske (born 1989)
  - 2001: Der kleine Mann
  - 2002: Bibi Blocksberg
  - 2003: The Jungle Book 2 (German singing voice of Mowgli)
  - 2003: Das fliegende Klassenzimmer
  - 2004: Rock Crystal
  - 2004: Kids' Ten Commandments (German voice of Ephraim)
  - 2005: Damals warst Du still
  - 2006: French for Beginners
  - 2006: The Last Train (voice of Izzy)
  - 2006: Breaking and Entering (German voice of Miro)
  - 2007: Ladyland (1 episode)
  - 2007: Die Schatzinsel
  - 2007: Tarragona - Ein Paradies in Flammen
- Mascha Gonska (born 1952)
  - 1969: Herzblatt oder Wie sag ich’s meiner Tochter?
  - 1970: The Sex Nest
  - 1970: Musik, Musik – da wackelt die Penne
  - 1970: Unsere Pauker gehen in die Luft
- Jeanne Goursaud (born 1996)
  - 2012: Neues aus Büttenwarder (1 episode)
  - 2012: Die Pfefferkörner (1 episode)
  - 2014: Charlottes Welt – Geht nicht, gibt’s nicht
- Cornelia Gröschel (born 1987)
  - 1998: Heimatgeschichten – Ein rettender Engel
  - 1998–1999: In aller Freundschaft
  - 1999: Das Geheimnis (short film)
  - 1999: Schlosshotel Orth – Spurensuche
  - 2000: Einmal Himmel und retour
  - 2001: Klinik unter Palmen (3 episodes)
  - 2001: Heidi
  - 2002: Lilly unter den Linden
  - 2003: Hilfe, ich bin Millionär
  - 2003: Für immer verloren
  - 2004: Experiment Bootcamp
  - 2005: In aller Freundschaft – Zerrissenes Herz
- Gustl Gstettenbaur (1914–1996)
  - 1928: The Page Boy at the Golden Lion
  - 1928: Band of Thieves
  - 1928: Volga Volga
  - 1929: The Eccentric
  - 1929: Fight of the Tertia
  - 1929: Woman in the Moon
  - 1929: The Mistress and her Servant
  - 1929: Big City Children
  - 1930: Delicatessen
  - 1930: Dolly Gets Ahead
  - 1930: Madame Pompadour
  - 1930: Vienna, City of Song
  - 1930: Die zärtlichen Verwandten
  - 1930: Kohlhiesels Töchter
  - 1930: Queen of the Night
  - 1931: Schubert's Dream of Spring
  - 1931: Der Storch streikt
  - 1931: Kyritz – Pyritz
  - 1931: Im Banne der Berge
  - 1931: The Wrong Husband
  - 1931: Elisabeth of Austria
  - 1931: The Night Without Pause
  - 1932: Girls to Marry
  - 1932: Spoiling the Game
  - 1932: The Secret of Johann Orth
  - 1932: Paprika
- Isa and Jutta Günther (born 1938)
  - 1950: Two Times Lotte
  - 1952: Die Wirtin von Maria Wörth
  - 1953: Ich und meine Frau
  - 1954: An jedem Finger zehn
  - 1954: Der erste Kuß
  - 1955: Du bist die Richtige
  - 1956: Liebe, Sommer und Musik
  - 1956: Die Fischerin vom Bodensee
  - 1957: Vier Mädels aus der Wachau
  - 1957: Die Zwillinge vom Zillertal

== H ==
- Jella Haase (born 1992)
  - 2009: Der letzte Rest (short film)
  - 2009: Mama kommt!
  - 2009: Liebe in anderen Umständen
  - 2009: Polizeiruf 110 – Tod im Atelier
  - 2010: Orpheus (short film)
  - 2010: Polizeiruf 110 – Einer von uns
  - 2010: Meine Familie bringt mich um!
- Cosma Shiva Hagen (born 1981)
  - 1996: Crash Kids
  - 1998: Das merkwürdige Verhalten geschlechtsreifer Großstädter zur Paarungszeit
  - 1998: Der Laden
  - 1999: Todesengel
  - 1999: Sweet Little Sixteen
  - 1999: Einfach raus
- Damian Hardung (born 1998)
  - 2011: Die Könige der Straße (short film)
  - 2012: online – meine Tochter in Gefahr
  - 2012: Transpapa
  - 2012: Unter Frauen
  - 2012: Die Holzbaronin
  - 2013: Clara und das Geheimnis der Bären
  - 2013: Mord in Eberswalde
  - 2015: Freundinnen – Alle für eine
  - 2015-2017: Club der roten Bänder
  - 2016: Der Hodscha und die Piepenkötter
  - 2016: SOKO Stuttgart – Kaiserbaby
- Harriet Herbig-Matten (born 2003)
  - 2017: Das Pubertier – Der Film
  - 2017: Dr. Klein – Im freien Fall
  - 2020: Bibi & Tina – Die Serie
  - 2020: Rea Garvey, VIZE – The One (music video)
  - 2021: Bekenntnisse des Hochstaplers Felix Krull
  - 2021: Nie zu spät
- Karoline Herfurth (born 1984)
  - 2000: Crazy
  - 2000: Küss mich, Frosch
  - 2001: Mädchen, Mädchen
  - 2002: Big Girls Don't Cry
- Martin Herzberg (1911–1972)
  - 1918: Jugendliebe
  - 1919: Die Sühne der Martha Marx
  - 1919: Das Geheimnis von Schloß Holloway
  - 1919: Pogrom
  - 1920: Die Benefiz-Vorstellung der vier Teufel
  - 1920: Der Halunkengeiger
  - 1921: Store forventninger
  - 1922: Lasse Månsson fra Skaane
  - 1922: David Copperfield
  - 1922: Den sidste dans
  - 1923: Paganini
  - 1923: The Hungarian Princess
  - 1923: All for Money
  - 1923: Wienerbarnet
  - 1924: Kan kvinder fejle?
  - 1924: Carlos and Elisabeth
  - 1924: Comedians of Life
  - 1925: The Blackguard
  - 1925: Freies Volk
  - 1927: Students' Love
  - 1927: Mary Stuart
  - 1928: The Age of Seventeen
  - 1928: Band of Thieves
  - 1929: Misled Youth
  - 1929: Youthful Indiscretion
  - 1929: The Youths
- Louis Hofmann (born 1997)
  - 2006–2009: Die Ausflieger
  - 2010: Danni Lowinski
  - 2010: The Lost Father
  - 2010: Tod in Istanbul
  - 2011: Wilsberg – Aus Mangel an Beweisen
  - 2011: Alarm für Cobra 11 – Die Autobahnpolizei
  - 2011: Tom Sawyer
  - 2012: The Adventures of Huck Finn
  - 2012: Stolberg
  - 2013: The Almost Perfect Man
  - 2013: SOKO Köln – Der stille Mord
  - 2014: The Witness House
  - 2015: Sanctuary
  - 2015: Land of Mine

== I ==
- René Ifrah (born 1972)
  - 1987-1996: Praxis Bülowbogen
- Sinje Irslinger (born 1996)
  - 2012: Guck Woanders hin (short film)
  - 2012: Palim Palim (short film)
  - 2012: Knallerfrauen (1 episode)
  - 2013: Tomo (short film)
  - 2013: Es ist alles in Ordnung
  - 2013: Zum Geburtstag – Geschenkt ist geschenkt...
  - 2014: Einmal Bauernhof und zurück

== J ==
- Julia Jäger (born 1970)
  - 1983: Moritz in der Litfaßsäule
- Moritz Jahn (born 1995)
  - 2008-2010: Die Pfefferkörner (28 episodes)
  - 2010: Prinz und Bottel
  - 2011: Der Himmel hat vier Ecken
  - 2011: Inga Lindström – Die Hochzeit meines Mannes
  - 2013: Mein Sommer '88 – Wie die Stars die DDR rockten
  - 2013: Stiller Abschied
  - 2013: Großstadtrevier (2 episodes)
- Robert Jarczyk (born 1959)
  - 1973: The Flying Classroom
  - 1974: Der Kommissar – Ein Anteil am Leben
  - 1975: Der Kommissar – Am Rande der Ereignisse
  - 1977: Polizeiinspektion 1 – Und keine Kopeke weniger

== K ==
- Roland Kaiser (1943–1998)
  - 1954: Don't Worry About Your Mother-in-Law
  - 1954: Eskapade
  - 1954: The Faithful Hussar
  - 1954: Emil and the Detectives
  - 1955: Meine Kinder und ich
  - 1956: Du bist Musik
  - 1957: Heute blau und morgen blau
  - 1957: Ferien auf Immenhof
  - 1957: The Girl and the Legend
  - 1957: The Zürich Engagement
  - 1957: Vater, unser bestes Stück
  - 1957: Casino de Paris
  - 1957: Liebe, Jazz und Übermut
  - 1958: Ohne Mutter geht es nicht
  - 1958: Ihr 106. Geburtstag
  - 1958: Munchhausen in Africa
  - 1958: Kleine Leute mal ganz groß
  - 1958: Man in the River
  - 1959: Roses for the Prosecutor
  - 1959: What a Woman Dreams of in Springtime
  - 1961: Always Trouble with the Bed
  - 1961: Ramona
- Nikola Kastner (born 1983)
  - 2001: Bronski und Bernstein (8 episodes)
- Christine Kaufmann (1945–2017)
  - 1952: The White Horse Inn
  - 1953: Prosecutor Corda
  - 1953: Salto Mortale
  - 1953: The Monastery's Hunter
  - 1954: Rose-Girl Resli
  - 1954: Der schweigende Engel
  - 1955: When the Alpine Roses Bloom
  - 1956: Ein Herz schlägt für Erika
  - 1956: Die Stimme der Sehnsucht
  - 1957: The Winemaker of Langenlois
  - 1957: Widower with Five Daughters
  - 1958: Mädchen in Uniform
  - 1958: Die singenden Engel von Tirol
  - 1958: Embezzled Heaven
  - 1959: Alle lieben Peter
  - 1959: Winter Holidays
  - 1959: The Last Days of Pompeii
  - 1959: First Love
  - 1960: Un trono para Cristy
  - 1960: Toto, Fabrizi and the Young People Today
  - 1960: Labbra rosse
  - 1960: The Last Pedestrian
  - 1960: Town Without Pity
  - 1961: Via Mala
  - 1961: A Man Named Rocca
  - 1961: The Phony American
  - 1961: Constantine and the Cross
  - 1961: Swordsman of Siena
  - 1961: Taras Bulba
  - 1962: Terror After Midnight
  - 1962: Escape from East Berlin
- Oskar Keymer (born 2003)
  - 2012: Hotel 13
  - 2013: West
  - 2013: Verbotene Liebe
  - 2013: Heldt (2 episodes)
  - 2013: Knallerfrauen
  - 2013: Without Sunlight (short film)
  - 2014: Weisse Steine
  - 2014: Nächstenliebe (short film)
  - 2015: Help, I Shrunk My Teacher
  - 2018: Help, I Shrunk My Parents
  - 2019: The Three Exclamation Marks
  - 2020: Heldt (one episode)
  - 2021: Help, I Shrunk My Friends
  - 2021: Der Lehrer (one episode)
- Wolfgang Kieling (1924–1985)
  - 1936: Maria the Maid
  - 1936: Guten Abend, gute Nacht
  - 1936: Hier irrt Schiller
  - 1937: Heimweh
  - 1937: The Kreutzer Sonata
  - 1938: Altes Herz geht auf die Reise
  - 1938: Women for Golden Hill
  - 1938: Klimbusch macht Wochenende
  - 1938: Träume sind Schäume
  - 1939: The Journey to Tilsit
  - 1940: Falstaff in Vienna
  - 1940: Herz geht vor Anker
  - 1940: Seitensprünge
  - 1941: Jenny und der Herr im Frack
  - 1941: Krach im Vorderhaus
- Nastassja Kinski (born 1961)
  - 1975: The Wrong Move
  - 1976: To the Devil a Daughter
  - 1977: Tatort: Reifezeugnis
  - 1977: Notsignale (episode: Im Nest)
  - 1978: Passion Flower Hotel
  - 1978: Stay as You Are
  - 1979: Tess
- Pola Kinski (born 1952)
  - 1960: Sie schreiben mit – Das warme Nest
  - 1962: Sie schreiben mit – Der Volltreffer
- Mats Köhlert (born 1998)
  - Advertisements for Kinder Chocolate, BMW, IKEA, Smarties, McDonald’s and Tchibo
- Blanche Kommerell (born 1950)
  - 1962: Rotkäppchen
  - 1963: Mariana Pineda
  - 1964: Rose Bernd
  - 1966: The Sons of Great Bear
  - 1966: Die Nacht zwischen Donnerstag und Freitag
  - 1966: Der Staatsanwalt hat das Wort: Bummel-Benno
  - 1967: Wendeleit ist wieder da
  - 1967: Neuland unterm Pflug
- Oliver Korittke (born 1968)
  - 1972–1974: Sesamstraße
  - 1976: Aktion Grün
  - 1977: Die drei Klumberger (13 episodes)
  - 1981: Sternensommer (6 episodes)
  - 1984–1985: Eine Klasse für sich (25 episodes)
  - 1985: The Black Forest Clinic: Die falsche Diagnose
  - 1986: Boundaries of Time: Caspar David Friedrich
  - 1986: Ich heirate eine Familie: Heimlichkeiten
- Lisa-Marie Koroll (born 1997)
  - 2006-2019: Familie Dr. Kleist (86 episodes)
  - 2014: Bibi & Tina
  - 2014: Bibi & Tina: Voll verhext!
- Nursel Köse (born 1961)
  - 1988: Yasemin
- Hansi Kraus (born 1952)
  - 1964: Lausbubengeschichten
  - 1965: Aunt Frieda
  - 1967: Onkel Filser – Allerneueste Lausbubengeschichten
  - 1967: Der Paukenspieler
  - 1967: When Ludwig Goes on Manoeuvres
  - 1968: Zur Hölle mit den Paukern
  - 1969: Ludwig auf Freiersfüßen
  - 1969: Pepe, der Paukerschreck
  - 1969: Hurra, die Schule brennt!
  - 1970: Das Glöcklein unterm Himmelbett
  - 1970: Musik, Musik – da wackelt die Penne
  - 1970: We'll Take Care of the Teachers
- David Kross (born 1990)
  - 2002: Hilfe, ich bin ein Junge!
  - 2002: Alphateam – Die Lebensretter im OP (1 episode)
  - 2003: Adam & Eva
  - 2006: Tough Enough
  - 2007: Hände weg von Mississippi
  - 2008: Krabat
  - 2008: The Reader
- Hardy Krüger (1928-2022)
  - 1944: Junge Adler
- Vanessa Krüger (born 1991)
  - 2006: French for Beginners
  - 2007: Alles Lüge – Auf der Suche nach Rio Reiser
  - 2007: 42plus
  - 2009: Invulnerable (short film)
  - 2009: Rosa Roth: Das Mädchen aus Sumy
  - 2009: Sterne über dem Eis
  - 2009: Gemeinsam einsam (short film)
- Tim Küchler (born 1986)
  - 1996: Mensch, Pia! (1 episode)
  - 1996–1997: Neues vom Süderhof (13 episodes)
  - 1998–2003: Die Kinder vom Alstertal (39 episodes)
- Emily Kusche (born 2002)
  - 2013: Das Kleine Gespenst
  - 2017: Tigermilch
  - 2018: Don't. Get. Out!
  - 2018: Balloon
  - 2019: Dogs of Berlin
  - 2019: Das perfekte Geheimnis
  - 2019: Der Kroatien-Krimi (1 episode)
  - 2020: Cortex
  - 2020-2024: Sløborn

== L ==
- Inge Landgut (1922–1986)
  - 1927: Violantha
  - 1928: Angst
  - 1929: Circumstantial Evidence
  - 1929: Perjury
  - 1929: A Mother's Love
  - 1929: The Unusual Past of Thea Carter
  - 1929: Women on the Edge
  - 1930: Phantoms of Happiness
  - 1930: Der Detektiv des Kaisers
  - 1930: Bookkeeper Kremke
  - 1931: M
  - 1931: Emil and the Detectives
  - 1931: Louise, Queen of Prussia
  - 1934: The Assumption of Hannele
  - 1935: Das Einmaleins der Liebe
  - 1937: Love Can Lie
  - 1938: The Girl of Last Night
  - 1938: Was tun, Sybille
- Alexandra Maria Lara (born 1978)
  - 1994: Stella Stellaris
  - 1995: Ich begehre dich
  - 1996: Mensch, Pia!
- Frederick Lau (born 1989)
  - 1999: Achterbahn – Der große Bruder
  - 2000: Policewoman
  - 2001: Jonathans Liebe
  - 2001: Wie angelt man sich einen Müllmann?
  - 2001: Drei Stern Rot
  - 2001: Doppelter Einsatz Berlin – Wehe dem, der liebt
  - 2001: Dr. Sommerfeld – Neues vom Bülowbogen – Ein Dream-Team
  - 2002: Der Tod ist kein Beinbruch – Der Opa
  - 2002: Der Brief des Kosmonauten
  - 2002: Kleeblatt küsst Kaktus
  - 2002: Fremde Kinder – Schlangen im Feuer (voice)
  - 2003–2004: Stefanie – Eine Frau startet durch
  - 2003: The Flying Classroom
  - 2003: Rotlicht – Im Dickicht der Großstadt
  - 2003: Vorsicht – keine Engel! – Handy-Fieber
  - 2004: Polizeiruf 110 – Die Mutter von Monte Carlo
  - 2004: Leipzig Homicide – Glückliche Familie
  - 2004: Sterne leuchten auch am Tag
  - 2004: Bibi Blocksberg and the Secret of the Blue Owls
  - 2004: Wer küsst schon einen Leguan?
  - 2004: Bergkristall
  - 2004: Der verzauberte Otter
  - 2005: The Call of the Toad
  - 2005: Destined to Witness
  - 2005: Schloss Einstein (episodes 341–343)
  - 2005: Cologne P.D. – Heckenschütze
  - 2005: Unsere 10 Gebote – Gebot 2: Du sollst den Namen des Herrn, deines Gottes, nicht missbrauchen
  - 2006: Cold Summer
  - 2006: An die Grenze
  - 2006: Der Kriminalist – Totgeschwiegen
  - 2007: Tatort – Bevor es dunkel wird
  - 2007: Liebling, wir haben geerbt!
  - 2007: An Old Maid
  - 2007: Wie verführ' ich meinen Ehemann
- Volker Lechtenbrink (1944–2021)
  - 1958-1970: Sie schreiben mit
  - 1959: Die Brücke
  - 1959: Professor Schnellfisch
  - 1960: Das Paradies
  - 1961: Auf der Suche nach Glück
  - 1961: Bei Pichler stimmt die Kasse nicht
  - 1962: Becket oder Die Ehre Gottes
  - 1962: So war Mama
  - 1962: Porträt einer Madonna
  - 1962: Im echten Manne ist ein Kind (1 episode)
- Nico Liersch (born 2000)
  - 2008: Der Einsturz
  - 2009: Die geerbte Familie
  - 2010: Die Liebe kommt mit dem Christkind
  - 2010: Herzflimmern – die Klinik am See
  - 2011: Africa Cries Out to You
  - 2011: Das Traumhotel – Brasilien
  - 2012: Schafkopf oder a bisserl was geht immer - Junior und Senior
  - 2012: Inga Lindström – Ein Lied für Solveig
  - 2012: Kokowääh 2
  - 2013: The Book Thief
  - 2016: Hanna's Sleeping Dogs
  - 2017: In aller Freundschaft – Die jungen Ärzte – Was wir geben
  - 2018: Daheim in den Bergen – Schuld und Vergebung
- Heiko Lochmann (born 1999)
  - 2015: Kartoffelsalat – Nicht fragen!
  - 2015: Bruder vor Luder
  - 2017: Storm of Love (8 episodes)
- Roman Lochmann (born 1999)
  - 2015: Kartoffelsalat – Nicht fragen!
  - 2015: Bruder vor Luder
  - 2017: Storm of Love (8 episodes)

== M ==
- Anton Mang (born 1949)
  - 1956: Die Heinzelmännchen
  - 1957: Der Wolf und die sieben Geißlein
  - 1957: Rübezahl
  - 1959: Die Bremer Stadtmusikanten
- Lena Mantler (born 2002)
  - 2019: Was wir wussten – Risiko Pille
- Lisa Mantler (born 2002)
  - 2019: Was wir wussten – Risiko Pille
- Tijan Marei (born 1996)
  - 2009: Das Echo der Schuld
  - 2014: Who Am I
  - 2014: Oblivio (short film)
- Jacob Matschenz (born 1984)
  - 2001: Kleine Kreise
  - 2002: Mutanten
  - 2002: Juls Freundin
  - 2002: Polizeiruf 110: Der Spieler
- Michaela May (born 1952)
  - 1964: Kommissar Freytag (2 episodes)
  - 1965: Uncle Tom's Cabin
  - 1965: Heidi
  - 1967: Der Tod läuft hinterher
  - 1967: Flucht ohne Ausweg
  - 1968: Die Jubilarin
  - 1969: Dead Body on Broadway
  - 1969: Der ewige Gatte
  - 1969: The Brazen Women
  - 1969: Pepe, der Paukerschreck
  - 1970: Kapitän Harmsen – Das bayerische Meer
- Lutz Moik (1930-2002)
  - 1944: Thank You, I'm Fine (released 1948)
  - 1945: Frühlingsmelodie
  - 1945: Meine Herren Söhne
  - 1947: And If We Should Meet Again
  - 1948: 1-2-3 Corona
- Patrick Mölleken (born 1993)
  - 2005: Alarm for Cobra 11 – The Highway Police (1 episode)
  - 2005: Carwash – Der Kadett
  - 2005: Robin Pilcher: Jenseits des Ozeans
  - 2005: Fragile (German voice)
  - 2006: Dragon Tiger Gate (German voice of a Child)
  - 2007: Kleiner Dodo (voice)
  - 2007: Evelyn (short film)
  - 2007: Das Traumschiff – San Francisco
  - 2008: Alles was zählt (2 episodes)
  - 2008: Familie Sonnenfeld – Angst um Tiffy
  - 2008: Maddin in Love (2 episodes)
  - 2008: Pfarrer Braun – Heiliger Birnbaum
  - 2008: Ihr könnt euch niemals sicher sein
  - 2008: Marie Brand und die tödliche Gier
  - 2008: Die Stählerne Zeit (documentary film)
  - 2009: Die Alpenklinik – Riskante Entscheidung
  - 2009: Kambakkht Ishq (German voice of Gangster #5)
  - 2009-2010: Bleach (German voice of Jinta Hanakari)
  - 2010: Bleach: Memories of Nobody (German voice of Jinta Hanakari)
  - 2010: Home for Christmas (German voice of Thomas)
  - 2010: Themba (German voice of Young Sipho)
  - 2010: Der Bergdoktor – Durch eisige Höhen
  - 2010: Rennschwein Rudi Rüssel (3 episodes)
  - 2010: Die Rückkehr der Wollmäuse (voice, short film)
  - 2010: In aller Freundschaft (1 episode)
  - 2010: Alle Jahre wieder
  - 2011: Quirk of Fate – Eine Laune des Schicksals
  - 2011: Murder in the Best Family
  - 2011: Aktenzeichen XY … ungelöst: 10 Krallen
  - 2011: Schmidt & Schmitt – Wir ermitteln in jedem Fall: Crash ins Koma
  - 2011: Isenhart – Die Jagd nach dem Seelenfänger
  - 2011: Grimmsberg (short film)
  - 2011: Zivilcourage (short film)
  - 2011: Tom’s Video
  - 2011: Extinction – The G.M.O. Chronicles
  - 2011: Gosick (German voice of The Lumberjack, 1 episode)
  - 2011: Beneath the Darkness (German voice of Travis)
- Gunnar Möller (1928-2017)
  - 1940: Our Miss Doctor
  - 1940: Hänsel und Gretel
  - 1941: Her Other Self
  - 1941: Kopf hoch, Johannes!
  - 1941: Immer nur Du
  - 1942: Between Heaven and Earth
  - 1942: Sein Sohn
  - 1942: Der Seniorchef
  - 1942: Meine Freundin Josefine
  - 1943: Floh im Ohr
  - 1943: Fritze Bollmann wollte angeln
  - 1943: Circus Renz
  - 1944: Meine vier Jungens
  - 1944: Ein Blick zurück
  - 1944: Junge Adler
  - 1944: The Degenhardts
  - 1944: Thank You, I'm Fine (released 1948)
  - 1945: The Noltenius Brothers
  - 1945: Leb' wohl, Christina
- Faye Montana (born 2003)
  - 2009: Rabbit Without Ears 2
  - 2010: Inga Lindström – episode Prinzessin des Herzens
  - 2013: Polizeiruf 110 – Fischerkrieg
  - 2016: Kreuzfahrt ins Glück – Hochzeitsreise an die Loire
  - 2016: Brief an mein Leben
  - 2017: Hanni & Nanni – Mehr als beste Freunde
- Friedel Morgenstern (born 1993)
  - 2003: Cheaper by the Dozen (German voice of Kim Baker)
  - 2003-2005: Jakers! The Adventures of Piggley Winks (German voice of Molly)
  - 2004: The Door in the Floor (German voice of Ruth Cole)
  - 2005: Charlie and the Chocolate Factory (German voice of Violet Beauregarde)
  - 2005: Because of Winn-Dixie (German voice of India Opal Buloni)
  - 2005: The Pacifier (German voice of Lulu Plummer)
  - 2005: Cheaper by the Dozen 2 (German voice of Kim Baker)
  - 2006: Offset
  - 2006: Grey's Anatomy (1 episode, German voice of Megan Clover)
  - 2006: Little Miss Sunshine (German voice of Olive Hoover)
  - 2007: No Reservations (German voice of Zoe)
  - 2007: Little King Macius
  - 2007: I Could Never Be Your Woman (German voice of Izzie)
  - 2008-2015: Degrassi: The Next Generation (German voice of Alli Bhandari)
  - 2008: Definitely, Maybe (German voice of Maya Hayes)
  - 2008: Nim's Island (German voice of Nim Rusoe)
  - 2009: My Sister's Keeper (German voice of Andromeda Fitzgerald)
  - 2009: Race to Witch Mountain (German voice of Sara)
  - 2009: Zombieland (German voice of Little Rock)
  - 2010: Trust (German voice of Annie Cameron)
  - 2010: The Nutcracker in 3D (German voice of Mary)
  - 2010: Despicable Me (German voice of Margo)
  - 2011: Cinema Verite (German voice of Michelle Loud)
  - 2011: Dream House (German voice of Chloe Patterson)
  - 2011: Rango (German voice of Priscilla)
  - 2011: New Year's Eve (German voice of Hailey)
  - 2011: Soul Surfer (German voice of Bethany Hamilton)
  - 2011: Little Big Panda (German voice of Jung Fu)
  - 2011: Hanna (German voice of Sophie)
  - 2011: Bad Teacher (German voice of Chase Rubin-Rossi)
  - 2011: Tokyo Magnitude 8.0 (German voice of Mirai Onosawa)
  - 2011: Body of Proof (German voice of Lacey Fleming)
  - 2011-2013: The Borgias (German voice of Lucrezia Borgia)
  - 2011-2013: Life with Boys (German voice of Tess Forster)
- Friedrich Mücke (born 1981)
  - 1991: Aerolina
- Anna Maria Mühe (born 1985)
  - 2002: Big Girls Don't Cry
- Mercedes Müller (born 1996)
  - 2003: 4 Freunde und 4 Pfoten
  - 2003: Das Herz ist rot
  - 2003: Der Mustervater – Allein unter Kindern
  - 2004: Polizeiruf 110: Dumm wie Brot
  - 2004: Das Bernstein-Amulett
  - 2005: Freundinnen fürs Leben
  - 2005: Tatort: Todesbrücke
  - 2005: Gloria
  - 2005: Rosa Roth – Im Namen des Vaters
  - 2005: Unter dem Eis
  - 2006-2007: Wege zum Glück (285 episodes)
  - 2009: Wild Chicks and Life
  - 2011: Mehr (short film)
  - 2012: Die Vermissten
  - 2013: Tatort: Willkommen in Hamburg
  - 2014: Sechse kommen durch die ganze Welt
  - 2014: Mona kriegt ein Baby
  - 2014: Ein offener Käfig

== N ==
- Jonas Nay (born 1990)
  - 2005-2006: Vier gegen Z (27 episodes)
  - 2007: Die Rettungsflieger – Muttersorgen
  - 2007: Großstadtrevier – Chefsache
  - 2008: Die Pfefferkörner (1 episode)
- Loni Nest (1916–1990)
  - 1918: The Story of Dida Ibsen
  - 1919: Opium
  - 1919: Die Ehe der Frau Mary
  - 1919: Harakiri
  - 1920: Kämpfende Gewalten oder Welt ohne Krieg
  - 1920: The Merry-Go-Round
  - 1920: Patience
  - 1920: Johannes Goth
  - 1920: The Golem: How He Came into the World
  - 1920: The Guilt of Lavinia Morland
  - 1920: The Wandering Image
  - 1921: Violet
  - 1921: Man Overboard
  - 1921: A Blackmailer's Trick
  - 1921: The Haunted Castle
  - 1921: Die Minderjährige – Zu jung fürs Leben
  - 1921: Parisian Women
  - 1921: The Convict of Cayenne
  - 1921: The Pearl of the Orient
  - 1921: Sturmflut des Lebens
  - 1922: Sunken Worlds
  - 1922: Nosferatu
  - 1922: Tabitha, Stand Up
  - 1922: A Dying Nation (2 parts)
  - 1922: Aus den Erinnerungen eines Frauenarztes (2 parts)
  - 1922: Alone in the Jungle
  - 1923: Quarantine
  - 1923: The Little Napoleon
  - 1923: Tragedy of Love
  - 1923: Fräulein Raffke
  - 1923: Der Evangelimann
  - 1923: Black Earth
  - 1924: Two Children
  - 1924: Mutter und Kind
  - 1925: Fire of Love
  - 1925: Kinderfreuden (short film)
  - 1925: The Blackguard
  - 1925: Joyless Street
  - 1925: A Song from Days of Youth
  - 1928: The Saint and Her Fool
  - 1928: The Story of a Little Parisian
  - 1933: L’Épervier
- Jannis Niewöhner (born 1992)
  - 2002: Tatort: Fakten, Fakten …
  - 2004: Für immer Edelweiss (short film)
  - 2004: Bang-Bang (short film)
  - 2005: Der Schatz der weißen Falken
  - 2006: TKKG: The Secret of the Mysterious Mind Machine
  - 2007: Wild Chicks in Love
  - 2007: Der Baum (short film)
  - 2007: Von Müttern und Töchtern
  - 2008: Sommer
  - 2009: Gangs
  - 2010: Freche Mädchen 2
  - 2010: Sant’Agostino
  - 2010: Undercover Love

== O ==
- Jimi Blue Ochsenknecht (born 1991)
  - 1999: Enlightenment Guaranteed
  - 2003: The Wild Soccer Bunch
  - 2005: Auf den Spuren der Vergangenheit
  - 2005: The Wild Soccer Bunch 2
  - 2006: The Wild Soccer Bunch 3
  - 2007: The Wild Soccer Bunch 4
  - 2008: The Wild Soccer Bunch 5
  - 2008: Summer
  - 2009: Gangs
- Uwe Ochsenknecht (born 1956)
  - 1972: Freizeitraum, Bau 2
- Wilson Gonzalez Ochsenknecht (born 1990)
  - 1999: Enlightenment Guaranteed
  - 2003: The Wild Soccer Bunch
  - 2005: The Wild Soccer Bunch 2
  - 2006: The Wild Soccer Bunch 3
  - 2006: The Ugly Duckling and Me! (German voice)
  - 2007: The Wild Soccer Bunch 4
  - 2008: Freche Mädchen
  - 2008: Crash (short film)
- Jürgen Ohlsen (1917–1994)
  - 1933: Hitlerjunge Quex
  - 1933: Alle machen mit (short film)
  - 1935: Wunder des Fliegens: Der Film eines deutschen Fliegers
- Tommi Ohrner (born 1965)
  - 1969: Der Kommissar – Die Schrecklichen
  - 1970: Hurra, unsere Eltern sind nicht da
  - 1970: Nachbarn sind zum Ärgern da
  - 1971: Hilfe, die Verwandten kommen
  - 1974: Kli-Kla-Klawitter
  - 1974: Stolen Heaven
  - 1974: Der Kommissar – Drei Brüder
  - 1976: Das Haus der Krokodile
  - 1977: Heidi, Girl of the Alps (German voice of Peter)
  - 1977: Babbelgamm
  - 1977: Brennendes Geheimnis
  - 1979–1980: Timm Thaler
  - 1979: Merlin
  - 1982: Manni, der Libero
  - 1982: Crazy Jungle Adventure
  - 1982: Ein dicker Hund
  - 1983: Die unglaublichen Abenteuer des Guru Jakob
  - 1983: Plem, Plem – Die Schule brennt

== P ==
- Hans-Georg Panczak (born 1952)
  - 1961: Aus Gründen der Sicherheit
  - 1962: Schule der Gattinnen
  - 1964: Am Sonntag gehört Vati uns
  - 1966: Vater einer Tochter
  - 1968: Erotik auf der Schulbank
  - 1968: Die Klasse
  - 1970: Kinderehen
  - 1970: Startsprünge - Die Geschichte einer Meisterschwimmerin
- Christina Plate (born 1965)
  - 1976: Kinder, Kinder
  - 1980: Asphaltnacht
  - 1982: Manni, der Libero (10 episodes)
- Josefine Preuß (born 1986)
  - 1998: ORB-Club
  - 2000–2003, 2006: Schloss Einstein (168 episodes)
  - 2002: Pengo! Steinzeit
  - 2004: Sabine (episode 1x02: Kurzer Prozess)
  - 2004: Inspektor Rolle: Herz in Not
  - 2004: Das Mörderspiel – Die Blumen des Bösen
  - 2004: The School Trip
  - 2004: Jargo
- Rico Puhlmann (1934-1996)
  - 1942: Front Theatre
  - 1943: Liebesgeschichten
  - 1944: Der kleine Muck
  - 1944: The Green Salon
  - 1945: Der Scheiterhaufen
  - 1949: The Marriage of Figaro

== R ==
- Vincent Redetzki (born 1992)
  - 1998: Gute Zeiten, schlechte Zeiten
  - 2003: Für alle Fälle Stefanie
  - 2004: Was heißt hier Oma!
  - 2004: Stauffenberg
  - 2005: Die Luftbrücke – Nur der Himmel war frei
  - 2005: Summer in Berlin
  - 2006: Wild Chicks
  - 2007: Wild Chicks in Love
  - 2009: Wild Chicks and Life
  - 2009: Für Miriam
  - 2009: Die Wölfe
  - 2009: Tatort: Mit ruhiger Hand
  - 2009: Der Doc und die Hexe
  - 2010: SOKO Leipzig – Ganz nah dran
  - 2010: The Coming Days
- Robinson Reichel (born 1966)
  - 1977-1978: Eichholz und Söhne (11 episodes)
  - 1978-1979: Unternehmen Rentnerkommune (4 episodes)
  - 1979: Cola, Candy, Chocolate
  - 1979: Das verbotene Spiel
- Nick Romeo Reimann (born 1998)
  - 2005: Bresso – Schaukel (advertisement)
  - 2006: SOKO 5113 – Ein besseres Leben
  - 2006: The Wild Soccer Bunch 3
  - 2007: The Wild Soccer Bunch 4
  - 2008: The Wild Soccer Bunch 5
  - 2009: The Crocodiles
  - 2010: The Crocodiles Strike Back
  - 2011: The Crocodiles: All for One
  - 2012: Turkish for Beginners
  - 2012: Der Cop und der Snob
  - 2012: Prag – Bis einer geht (Music video)
  - 2013: Young Fast & Fierce
  - 2015: SOKO 5113 – Auf Abwegen
  - 2015: V8 – Die Rache der Nitros
  - 2016: The Old Fox – Liebesrausch
  - 2016: In our Country
- Grete Reinwald (1902–1983)
  - 1914: Ein Sommernachtstraum in unserer Zeit
  - 1916: Proletardrengen
  - 1919: Die Schuld
  - 1920: The Night of Decision
  - 1920: Kämpfende Gewalten oder Welt ohne Krieg
  - 1920: Der Menschheit Anwalt
  - 1920: Das Ende des Abenteuers Paolo de Gaspardo
- Hanni Reinwald (1903–1978)
  - 1913: Der Film von der Königin Luise
  - 1913: Der Feind im Land
  - 1913: Der wankende Glaube
  - 1914: Ein Sommernachtstraum in unserer Zeit
  - 1914: Bismarck
  - 1914: Ein Kindesherz
  - 1916: Proletardrengen
  - 1919: Revenge Is Mine
  - 1920: Mascotte
  - 1921: Verrat auf Schloß Treuenfels
  - 1921: Der Silberkönig (4 parts)
  - 1921: Der Bagnosträfling
- Otto Reinwald (1899–1968)
  - 1913: Der Film von der Königin Luise
  - 1914: Ein Sommernachtstraum in unserer Zeit
  - 1914: The Mysterious X
  - 1914: The Silent Mill
  - 1914: Im Schützengraben
  - 1915: Fluch der Schönheit
  - 1915: Der zwölfjährige Kriegsheld
  - 1915: Pengenes magt
  - 1915: Filmens datter
  - 1915: Katastrofen i Kattegat
  - 1916: Proletardrengen
  - 1916: Blind Justice
  - 1916: Fliegende Schatten
  - 1916: Das Mysterium des Schlosses Clauden
  - 1917: Fliegende Schatten
  - 1917: Die Fußspur
  - 1917: Giovannis Rache
- Hans Richter (1919–2008)
  - 1931: Emil and the Detectives
  - 1931: The Night Without Pause
  - 1932: The Blue of Heaven
  - 1933: Manolescu, der Fürst der Diebe
  - 1933: The Burning Secret
  - 1933: Hände aus dem Dunkel
  - 1933: Fahrt ins Grüne
  - 1933: Hitlerjunge Quex
  - 1933: The Page from the Dalmasse Hotel
  - 1933: Three Bluejackets and a Blonde
  - 1933: Keine Angst vor Liebe
  - 1934: A Precocious Girl
  - 1934: The Black Whale
  - 1934: The English Marriage
  - 1935: Knock Out
  - 1935: Großreinemachen
  - 1935: Ein ganzer Kerl
  - 1935: The Dreamer
  - 1936: The Court Concert
  - 1936: Soldaten – Kameraden
  - 1936: The Violet of Potsdamer Platz
  - 1936: The Girl Irene
  - 1937: Vor Liebe wird gewarnt
  - 1937: An Enemy of the People
  - 1937: The Man Who Was Sherlock Holmes
  - 1937: Das große Abenteuer
- Ilja Richter (born 1952)
  - 1962: So toll wie anno dazumal
  - 1963: Schwarz auf Weiß
  - 1963: Charade (voice)
  - 1963: Piccadilly Zero Hour 12
  - 1964: Die Schneekönigin
  - 1967: Till, der Junge von nebenan
  - 1969: I'm an Elephant, Madame
  - 1969: Tony’s Freunde
  - 1969–1970: 4-3-2-1 Hot & Sweet
  - 1970: When the Mad Aunts Arrive
  - 1970: Unsere Pauker gehen in die Luft
  - 1970: Musik, Musik – da wackelt die Penne
- Judith Richter (born 1978)
  - 1990: Die Architekten
- Paula Riemann (born 1993)
  - 2004: Bergkristall
  - 2006: Wild Chicks
  - 2006: Störtebeker
  - 2007: Wild Chicks in Love
- Max Riemelt (born 1984)
  - 1997: Eine Familie zum Küssen
  - 1998: Zwei allein (6 episodes)
  - 1999: Weihnachtsmärchen – Wenn alle Herzen schmelzen
  - 2000: Bear on the Run
  - 2000: Brennendes Schweigen
  - 2001: Mädchen, Mädchen
  - 2001: Mein Vater und andere Betrüger
  - 2002: Alphateam – Die Lebensretter im OP: Respekt
  - 2002: Sextasy
  - 2002: Balko: Giftzwerg
- Oliver Rohrbeck (born 1965)
  - 1973: Sesame Street
  - 1973: Peter ist der Boss (1 episode)
  - 1973: Pinocchio (voice of Pinocchio in the 2nd German dub)
  - 1973: Bambi (voice of Teenage Thumper in the 3rd German dub)
  - 1974: Robin Hood (German voice of Skippy)
  - 1974: Världens bästa Karlsson (German voice of Lillebror)
  - 1975: Berlin – 0:00 bis 24:00
  - 1976: Verregnete Ferien
  - 1976: Rappelkiste (1 episode)
  - 1976: Den lieben langen Tag (1 episode)
  - 1977: Die Vorstadtkrokodile (voice)
  - 1977: Grisù (German voice of Grisú)
  - 1977: Kimba the White Lion (German voice of Benny and Mixed Pickle)
  - 1978: The Brothers Lionheart (German voice of Karl "Skorpan" Lionheart)
  - 1978: Direktion City (1 episode)
  - 1978-1979: The Famous Five (German voice of Julian)
  - 1982: Leben im Winter
- Yella Rottländer (born 1964)
  - 1973: The Scarlet Letter
  - 1974: Alice in the Cities
  - 1976: Paul und Paulinchen

== S ==
- Emilio Sakraya (born 1996)
  - 2008: Speed Racer
  - 2010: Zeiten ändern dich
  - 2012: Die Draufgänger (1 episode)
  - 2013: V8 – Du willst der Beste sein
  - 2013: Der Prinz von Gmünd (short film)
  - 2014: Bibi & Tina: Voll verhext!
  - 2014: Kein Entkommen
  - 2014: Die Detektive (1 episode)
- Hans Joachim Schaufuß (1918–1941)
  - 1931: Die Bräutigamswitwe
  - 1931: Emil and the Detectives
  - 1932: The White Demon
  - 1932: Peter Voss, Thief of Millions
  - 1933: The Burning Secret
  - 1933: Der Zarewitsch
  - 1934: Nischt geht über die Gemütlichkeit
  - 1934: Annette in Paradise
  - 1934: Die Töchter ihrer Exzellenz
  - 1935: The Dreamer
  - 1936: Stradivaris Schülergeige
  - 1936: Stjenka Rasin
  - 1936: Game on Board
  - 1936: The Beggar Student
- Alexander Scheer (born 1976)
  - 1988: Kai aus der Kiste
- Tobias Schenke (born 1981)
  - 1994-1995: Geheim – oder was?! (7 episodes)
  - 1996: Große Lügen - kleine Lügen
  - 1997: Knockin’ on Heaven’s Door
  - 1998: Dr. Sommerfeld - Neues vom Bülowbogen (1 episode)
  - 1998: Im Namen des Gesetzes (1 episode)
  - 1998: Das merkwürdige Verhalten geschlechtsreifer Großstädter zur Paarungszeit
  - 1998: Schimanski: Rattennest
  - 1998: Solo für Klarinette
  - 1998: Mein Freund, der Bulle
  - 1999: Alles Bob!
  - 1999: Downhill City
  - 1999: Unschuldige Biester
  - 1999: Tödliche Schatten
  - 1999: Schlaraffenland
  - 1999: Ein Fall für zwei – Tod eines Hackers
- Tom Schilling (born 1982)
  - 1988: Stunde der Wahrheit
  - 1996: Hallo, Onkel Doc!: Manege frei
  - 1999: Tatort: Kinder der Gewalt
  - 1999: Schlaraffenland
  - 2000: Crazy
  - 2000: Der Himmel kann warten
- Elisa Schlott (born 1994)
  - 2006: Das Geheimnis von St. Ambrose
  - 2007: Die Frau vom Checkpoint Charlie
  - 2008: Der große Tom
  - 2008: Polizeiruf 110: Geliebter Mörder
  - 2009: Losing Balance
  - 2009: Giulias Verschwinden
  - 2011: Das unsichtbare Mädchen
  - 2011: Fliegende Fische müssen ins Meer
  - 2012: Finn und der Weg zum Himmel
  - 2012: Das Wochenende
- Romy Schneider (1938-1982)
  - 1953: When the White Lilacs Bloom Again
  - 1954: Fireworks
  - 1954: Victoria in Dover
  - 1955: The Last Man
  - 1955: Die Deutschmeister
  - 1955: Sissi
  - 1956: Sissi – The Young Empress
  - 1956: Kitty and the Great Big World
- Theresa Scholze (born 1980)
  - 1993: Wolffs Revier: Das Wunder
  - 1995: Schwarz greift ein: Durchgebrannt
  - 1996: Mensch, Pia! (7 episodes)
  - 1996-1998: Die Geliebte
  - 1997: Sophie: Schlauer als die Polizei (1 episode)
  - 1997: Für alle Fälle Stefanie – Zwei Mütter, eine Tochter
  - 1998: Derrick – Die Tochter des Mörders
  - 1998: Salto Kommunale (2 episodes)
  - 1998: All My Daughters (2 episodes)
  - 1998-2006: Der letzte Zeuge (32 episodes)
  - 1998-1999: Am liebsten Marlene (3 episodes)
  - 1998: In aller Freundschaft – Schadensbegrenzung
- Marie-Luise Schramm (born 1984)
  - 1993: We're Back! A Dinosaur's Story (German voice of Cecilia Nuthatch)
  - 1993: Mrs. Doubtfire (German voice of Natalie Hillard)
  - 1994: Miracle on 34th Street (German voice of Susan Walker)
  - 1995-1999: Our Charly
  - 1996: Wolkenstein (1 episode)
  - 1996: Die Gespenster von Flatterfels (1 episode)
  - 1996: Das Traumschiff – Singapur
  - 1997: Praxis Bülowbogen: Auf der Kippe
  - 1997: A Simple Wish (German voice of Anabel Greening)
  - 1997: Contact (German voice of Ellie Arroway as a child)
  - 1997-1999: Mama ist unmöglich
  - 1998: Pippi Longstocking (German voice of Annika Settergren)
  - 1999: Balloon Farm (German voice of Willow Johnson)
  - 1999: Notting Hill (German dub)
  - 2000: Der Sommer mit Boiler
  - 2000: Nur das Blaue vom Himmel
  - 2000: Digimon Adventure (German voice of Hikari "Kari" Yagami)
  - 2000: Pitch Black(German voice of Jackie)
  - 2000: The Little Vampire (German voice of Anna Sackwell-Bagg)
  - 2000: Thomas and the Magic Railroad (German voice of Lily Stone)
  - 2001: Getting My Brother Laid
  - 2001: Digimon Adventure 02 (German voice of Hikari "Kari" Yagami)
  - 2001-2003: Angela Anaconda (German voice of Angela Anaconda)
  - 2001-2003: The Tribe (German voice of Cloe)
  - 2002: Das letzte Versteck
  - 2002: Erste Liebe
  - 2002: Deutschstunde
  - 2002: Herzschlag - Das Ärzteteam Nord: Voodoo
  - 2002: Dr. Slump (German voice of Arale Norimaki)
  - 2002: Eva & Adam (German voice of Eva Strömdahl)
  - 2002: Klatretøsen (German voice of Ida Johansen)
- Paula Schramm (born 1989)
  - 1997: Hallo, Onkel Doc!: Albert
  - 1997: Praxis Bülowbogen (episodes 114–122)
  - 1998: OP ruft Dr. Bruckner: Jung und eingesperrt
  - 1999-2000: Our Charly (5th & 6th season)
  - 2000: Gripsholm
  - 2000: Beim nächsten Coup … wird alles anders
  - 2001: Beloved Sister
  - 2001–2006: Schloss Einstein (episodes 171–384)
  - 2003: Meine schönsten Jahre: Liebesreigen Ost
  - 2004–2006: Check Eins (trailers/clips of the shows)
  - 2004: Check Eins (Making Of Vier gegen Z)
  - 2004: Appassionata (voice)
  - 2005: Abschnitt 40: Mädchen und Jungs
  - 2006: French for Beginners
  - 2006: Allein unter Bauern (episodes 1–10)
  - 2007–2008: Hallo Robbie! (episodes 1–5)
  - 2007: In aller Freundschaft: Die jungen Ärzte
- Hannelore Schroth (1922–1987)
  - 1931: Dann schon lieber Lebertran (short film)
  - 1939: Spiel im Sommerwind
  - 1939: Weißer Flieder
  - 1939: Kitty and the World Conference
  - 1939: The Governor
  - 1940: Friedrich Schiller – The Triumph of a Genius
- Emilia Schüle (born 1992)
  - 2005: Nichts weiter als (short film)
  - 2006: Guten Morgen, Herr Grothe
  - 2007: Manatu – Nur die Wahrheit rettet Dich
  - 2008: Brüderchen und Schwesterchen
  - 2008: Lucky Fritz
  - 2008: Freche Mädchen
  - 2009: Gangs
  - 2009: Meine wunderbare Familie
  - 2009: Factor 8
  - 2010: Rock It!
  - 2010: Freche Mädchen 2
  - 2010: Aschenputtel
- Wilhelm Schulte (1920-2005)
  - 1936: Standschütze Bruggler
  - 1937: Der Katzensteg
  - 1937: The Voice of the Heart
  - 1938: Frau Sixta
- Tim Oliver Schultz (born 1988)
  - 2000: Beim nächsten Coup wird alles anders
  - 2001: Von der Rolle
  - 2001: Ein starkes Team – Verraten und verkauft
  - 2002: Opa Online
  - 2003: Sternzeichen
  - 2004: Wie erziehe ich meine Eltern? – Alles ganz anders!
  - 2005: Das Haus der schlafenden Schönen
  - 2005: Krimi.de (2 episodes)
  - 2005: Glück auf halber Treppe
  - 2005–2006: Schloss Einstein (13 episodes)
  - 2006: Das Geheimnis im Moor
- Jannik Schümann (born 1992)
  - 2003: Die Rettungsflieger: Rivalen im Cockpit
  - 2007: Das Glück am anderen Ende der Welt
  - 2007: Tatort: Liebeshunger
  - 2007: The Three Investigators and the Secret of Skeleton Island (German voice of Jupiter Jones)
  - 2009: The Three Investigators and the Secret of Terror Castle (German voice of Jupiter Jones)
  - 2009: Stubbe – Von Fall zu Fall: Im toten Winkel
  - 2009: Die Pfefferkörner (4 Folgen)
  - 2009: WinneToons – Die Legende vom Schatz im Silbersee (voice)
  - 2010: Dance Academy (German voice of Sean)
  - 2010: Kommissarin Lucas – Wenn alles zerbricht
  - 2010: SOKO Wismar: Die Prophezeiung
  - 2010: Garmischer Bergspitzen
- Emma Schweiger (born 2002)
  - 2005: Barefoot
  - 2007: Rabbit Without Ears
  - 2009: Men in the City
  - 2009: Rabbit Without Ears 2
  - 2011: Kokowääh
  - 2012: Und weg bist du
  - 2013: Kokowääh 2
  - 2013: Keinohrhase und Zweiohrküken (voice)
  - 2014: Head Full of Honey
  - 2016: Conni & Co
  - 2017: Conni & Co 2 – Das Geheimnis des T-Rex
  - 2018: Head Full of Honey
- Lilli Schweiger (born 1998)
  - 2007: Rabbit Without Ears
  - 2009: Rabbit Without Ears 2
  - 2011–2012: Die Pfotenbande (5 Episodes)
- Luna Schweiger (born 1997)
  - 2007: Rabbit Without Ears
  - 2009: Phantomschmerz
  - 2009: Rabbit Without Ears 2
  - 2011: Kokowääh
  - 2011: Die Pfotenbande (12 episodes)
  - 2012: Guardians
  - 2013: Kokowääh 2
  - 2013: Tatort: Willkommen in Hamburg
  - 2014: Tatort: Kopfgeld
- Matthias Schweighöfer (born 1981)
  - 1997: Raus aus der Haut
  - 1997: Spuk aus der Gruft
- Ernst-Georg Schwill (1939-2020)
  - 1954: Alarm in the Circus
  - 1956: A Berlin Romance
  - 1957: Berlin, Schoenhauser Corner
- Anna-Lena Schwing (born 1996)
  - 2013: Die Pfefferkörner (2 episodes)
  - 2014: Großstadtrevier – Der gute Bulle
  - 2014-2015: In Your Dreams (11 episodes)
  - 2014: SOKO Köln – Camilla und die tote Nonne
  - 2014: Engel der Gerechtigkeit – Geld oder Leben
- Leon Seidel (born 1996)
  - 2009: Berlin 36
  - 2010: Devil's Kickers
  - 2009: Tatort: Der Fluch der Mumie
  - 2009–2011: Stromberg (4 episodes)
  - 2010: Wintertochter
  - 2011: Tom Sawyer
  - 2012: The Adventures of Huck Finn
  - 2014: Nachbarn Süß-Sauer
  - 2014: Die Auserwählten
  - 2014: Der Lehrer: Kann ich hier mobben?
  - 2014: Cologne P.D.: Auf der schiefen Bahn
- Klaus Detlef Sierck (1925–1944)
  - 1935: Die Saat geht auf
  - 1937: Streit um den Knaben Jo
  - 1937: Serenade
  - 1938: Covered Tracks
  - 1938: Sehnsucht nach Afrika
  - 1938: Shadows Over St. Pauli
  - 1938: A Prussian Love Story
  - 1939: The Immortal Heart
  - 1939: Cadets
  - 1939: The Right to Love
  - 1940: Aus erster Ehe
  - 1941: Kopf hoch, Johannes!
  - 1942: The Great King
- Marianne Simson (1920-1992)
  - 1935: Frisians in Peril
  - 1938: Das Verlegenheitskind
- Sabine Sinjen (1942-1995)
  - 1957: Das Geheimnis
  - 1957: The Big Chance
  - 1957: Precocious Youth
  - 1958: Schmutziger Engel
  - 1958: Mädchen in Uniform
  - 1958: Stefanie
  - 1959: Old Heidelberg
  - 1960: A Glass of Water
  - 1960: Kein Engel ist so rein
  - 1960: Stefanie in Rio
  - 1960: Sabine und die hundert Männer
- Jutta Speidel (born 1954)
  - 1969: Pepe, der Paukerschreck
  - 1969: Hurra, die Schule brennt!
  - 1970: Mädchen beim Frauenarzt
  - 1970: We'll Take Care of the Teachers
  - 1971: Twenty Girls and the Teachers
  - 1971: Morgen fällt die Schule aus
  - 1971: Rosy und der Herr aus Bonn
  - 1971: Our Willi Is the Best
  - 1972: Außer Rand und Band am Wolfgangsee
  - 1972: The Heath Is Green
- Stefanie Stappenbeck (born 1974)
  - 1986: Der Elterntauschladen
  - 1988: Die Weihnachtsgans Auguste
  - 1990: Die Mauerbrockenbande
  - 1990: Biologie!
  - 1992: Miraculi
- Lina Larissa Strahl (born 1997)
  - 2014: Bibi & Tina
  - 2014: Bibi & Tina: Voll verhext!

== T ==
- Mina Tander (born 1979)
  - 1995: Verbotene Liebe (1 episode)
  - 1996: Absprung
- Anna Thalbach (born 1973)
  - 1981: Angels of Iron
  - 1982: Domino
  - 1988: The Passenger – Welcome to Germany
  - 1989: Brausepulver (1 episode)
  - 1990: Herzlich willkommen
  - 1991: Jugend ohne Gott
- Katharina Thalbach (born 1954)
  - 1960: Gerichtet bei Nacht
  - 1962: Die letzte Chance
  - 1962: Die Weber
  - 1963-1964: Der Neue
  - 1969: Dolles Familienalbum
  - 1972: Es ist eine alte Geschichte
- Cordula Trantow (born 1942)
  - 1957: Mischief in Wonderland
  - 1959: The Bridge
  - 1960: Boomerang
  - 1960: Tomorrow Is My Turn
  - 1960: Sacred Waters
- Theo Trebs (born 1994)
  - 2006: Die kleine Benimmschule 2 (educational video)
  - 2009: Krupp: A Family Between War and Peace
  - 2009: Prinz & Bottelknabe
  - 2009: Lilly the Witch: The Dragon and the Magic Book
  - 2009: The White Ribbon
  - 2010: Rammbock: Berlin Undead
  - 2010: Inspektor Barbarotti – Mensch ohne Hund
  - 2011: Lessons of a Dream
  - 2012: Tatort – Der Wald steht schwarz und schweiget
  - 2012: Tatort – Fette Hunde
  - 2012: A Coffee in Berlin
- Benjamin Trinks (born 1990)
  - 2004: The Village (German dub)
  - 2005: Zack! Comedy nach Maß
  - 2005: Sabine! (2 episodes)
  - 2005: Krimi.de (2 episodes)
  - 2005: Wo bleibst du, Baby?
  - 2006-2008: Kurze Pause
  - 2007: Leo - Ein fast perfekter Typ (1 episode)
  - 2007: Tatort: Schleichendes Gift
  - 2007: Schloss Einstein (2 episodes)
  - 2008: In aller Freundschaft: Alles oder Nichts
  - 2008: Die Stein (3 episodes)
  - 2008: Ich liebe den Mann meiner besten Freundin
  - 2008: The Reader
  - 2008: Stella (German voice of Loïc and Eric)
- Nora Tschirner (born 1981)
  - 1996: Achterbahn – Der Ferienjob
- Nini Tsiklauri (born 1992)
  - 2006: The Wild Soccer Bunch 3
  - 2008-2010: Schloss Einstein (145 episodes)

== U ==
- Janina Uhse (born 1989)
  - 2002–2003: Die Kinder vom Alstertal (3 episodes)
  - 2002: Der Rattenkönig
  - 2003: Die Pfefferkörner: Diamantenfieber
  - 2003–2008: Der Landarzt (18 episodes)
  - 2005: Die Rettungsflieger: Irrtümer
- Langston Uibel (born 1998)
  - 2008: Speed Racer
  - 2008: The String Puppet (short film)
  - 2011: Sellout (short film)
  - 2013: Hanni & Nanni 3
  - 2014: Leichenschmaus (short film)
  - 2014: Oblivio (short film)
  - 2015: Freistatt
  - 2015: Letzte Spur Berlin: Abseitsfalle
  - 2016: Les marées blanches (short film)
- Kostja Ullmann (born 1984)
  - 1996: Das Rennen (short film)
  - 1998/1999: Alphateam – Die Lebensretter im OP (episodes 2.24 and 4.14)
  - 1999: Die Pfefferkörner: Die Schimmelprinzessin (episode 6)
  - 1999: Strandnähe (short film)
  - 1999: König auf Mallorca
  - 1999: Zwei Männer am Herd
  - 2000: Albtraum einer Ehe
  - 2001: Stahlnetz: Das Gläserne Paradies
  - 2001: Das Duo – Tod am Strand (episode 1.2)
  - 2002: Großstadtrevier: Rosenkrieger
  - 2002: Familie XXL
  - 2002: Stubbe – Von Fall zu Fall: Das vierte Gebot

== V ==
- Lea van Acken (born 1999)
  - 2014: Stations of the Cross
  - 2015: Heil
  - 2015: Homeland (episode 5x02)
  - 2016: Das Tagebuch der Anne Frank
  - 2016: Sag mir nichts
  - 2016: Spreewaldkrimi – Spiel mit dem Tod
  - 2016: Ferien
  - 2017: Bibi & Tina: Perfect Pandemonium
  - 2017: Windstorm 3: Windstorm and the Wild Horses
  - 2017: Fack ju Göhte 3
- Sanny van Heteren (born 1977)
  - 1992: Ein Fall für TKKG: Drachenauge
- Michael Verhoeven (1938-2024)
  - 1954: The Flying Classroom
  - 1955: Marianne
  - 1955: Reaching for the Stars
- Lisa Vicari (born 1997)
  - 2009: Tunnelblicke (short film)
  - 2010: Viki Ficki (short film)
  - 2010: Hanni & Nanni
  - 2011: Und dennoch lieben wir
  - 2011: Hell
  - 2011: Someone Like Him
  - 2013: Unter Verdacht: Ohne Vergebung
  - 2014: Playing Doctor
  - 2014: Die Chefin: Tod eines Lehrers
- Suzanne von Borsody (born 1957)
  - 1964: Das Kriminalmuseum: Der Fahrplan
  - 1967: Der Mann aus dem Bootshaus
- Max von der Groeben (born 1992)
  - 2004–2005: Bernds Hexe
  - 2005: The Little Polar Bear 2: The Mysterious Island (voice)
  - 2005: Rotkäppchen
  - 2006–2008: Nouky und seine Freunde (German version of Playhouse Disney)
  - 2008: Lenny & Twiek (9 episodes, voice)
  - 2007: Spurlos – Alles muss versteckt sein
  - 2009: Danni Lowinski – Mutterkind
- Andreas von der Meden (1943-2017)
  - 1949: The Prisoner
  - 1954: Der Hecktaler
  - 1954: Die Auster und die Perle
  - 1959: Der Andere
  - 1959: Professor Schnellfisch
- Constantin von Jascheroff (born 1986)
  - 1995: Rudy, the Racing Pig
  - 1995: Babyfon – Mörder im Kinderzimmer
  - 1995: The Seventh Brother (voice)
  - 1995: Bobo und die Hasenbande (voice)
  - 1996–2003: Monster by Mistake (voice)
  - 1996: Faust – Kinder der Straße
  - 1997: A.S. (episodes 2x01–2x02)
  - 1997: Beauty and the Beast: The Enchanted Christmas (German voice of Chip)
  - 1998: Hallo, Onkel Doc! (episode 5x07)
  - 1998: Titus, der Satansbraten
  - 1998: Titus und der Fluch der Diamanten
  - 1999: Star Wars: Episode I – The Phantom Menace (German voice of Anakin Skywalker)
  - 1999: E-M@il an Gott
  - 1999: Magnolia (German voice of Dixon)
  - 2000: My Dog Skip (German voice of Willie Morris)
  - 2000: The Little Vampire (German voice of Rudolph Sackville-Bagg)
  - 2000: The Life & Adventures of Santa Claus (German voice of Ethan and Megan)
  - 2000: Anke (episode 1x07)
  - 2001: Die Boegers
  - 2001: Yu-Gi-Oh! (German voice of Ryo Bakura)
  - 2001–2004: Lizzie McGuire (German voice of Gordo)
  - 2003–2006: Xiaolin Showdown (German voice of Raimundo)
  - 2003–2006: The Save-Ums! (German voice of Custard)
  - 2003: The Lizzie McGuire Movie (German voice of Gordo)
  - 2003: Holes (German voice of Squid)
  - 2003: Sperling – Sperling und der Mann im Abseits
  - 2004: A Cinderella Story (German voice of Ryan Hanson)
  - 2004: Jargo
  - 2004: Schloss Einstein (1 episode)
- Sidonie von Krosigk (born 1989)
  - 1999: Verschwinde von hier
  - 1999: Die Rache der Carola Waas
  - 2000: Anwalt Abel – Das Geheimnis der Zeugin
  - 2000: Autsch, Du Fröhliche
  - 2002: Bibi Blocksberg
  - 2002: Was ist bloß mit meinen Männern los?
  - 2002: Spirited Away (German voice of Chihiro)
  - 2003: Unsre Mutter ist halt anders
  - 2004: Bibi Blocksberg und das Geheimnis der blauen Eulen
  - 2005: Heidi (German voice of Clara Sesemann)
  - 2005: Edel & Starck – Adel verpflichtet
  - 2006: Väter, denn sie wissen nicht was sich tut
  - 2006: Pik & Amadeus – Freunde wider Willen
- Alicia von Rittberg (born 1993)
  - 2006: Der Alte: Tödliches Schweigen
  - 2007: Die Lawine
  - 2008: Die Sache mit dem Glück
  - 2009: Romy
  - 2008-2009: Meine wunderbare Familie (5 episodes)
  - 2010: Das Geheimnis der Wale
  - 2011: Der Alte: Zivilcourage
  - 2011: Hindenburg
  - 2011: Eine ganz heiße Nummer

== W ==
- Lara Wendel (born 1965)
  - 1972: My Dear Killer
  - 1972: The Italian Connection
  - 1973: Redneck
  - 1974: The Perfume of the Lady in Black
  - 1977: Maladolescenza
  - 1978: Little Girl in Blue Velvet
  - 1979: Un'ombra nell'ombra
  - 1979: Mimi
  - 1979: Ernesto
  - 1980: Desideria – La vita interiore
  - 1981: Il falco e la colomba
  - 1982: Identification of a Woman
  - 1982: Tenebrae
  - 1983: Vai alla grande
- Rolf Wenkhaus (1917–1942)
  - 1931: Emil and the Detectives
  - 1932: Spoiling the Game
  - 1933: S.A. Mann Brand
- Fritz Wepper (1941-2024)
  - 1955: The Dark Star
  - 1956: Das Abschiedsgeschenk
  - 1956: Tischlein, deck dich
  - 1957: Heute blau und morgen blau
  - 1957: Rübezahl
  - 1958: Zwei Matrosen auf der Alm
  - 1958: The Crammer
  - 1959: The Angel Who Pawned Her Harp
  - 1959: The Bridge
- Ilse Werner (1921-2005)
  - 1938: Die unruhigen Mädchen
  - 1938: Frau Sixta
  - 1938: Das Leben kann so schön sein
  - 1939: Bel Ami
  - 1939: Fräulein
  - 1939: Drei Väter um Anna
  - 1939: Her First Experience
- Philip Wiegratz (born 1993)
  - 2005: Charlie and the Chocolate Factory
  - 2005: A Christmoose Carol
  - 2006: Wild Chicks
  - 2006: Berndivent: Kasten
  - 2007: Wild Chicks in Love
  - 2008: Krimi.de: Chatgeflüster
  - 2009: Die Wölfe: Nichts kann uns trennen
  - 2009: The Wild Chicks and Life
  - 2010–2011: Der Schlunz – Die Serie (2 episodes)
- Birthe Wolter (born 1981)
  - 1996: Jede Menge Leben (9 episodes)
  - 1996: SK-Babies (1 episode)
  - 1997: Nikola (1 episode)
  - 1997: Kleine Einbrecher
  - 1999: Ein starkes Team: Im Visier des Mörders
  - 1999: CityExpress (5 episodes)
  - 1999–2002: Ein Fall für zwei (4 episodes)
- Florian Wünsche (born 1991)
  - 2002: Vorsicht – Keine Engel
  - 2004: Wer küsst schon einen Leguan?
  - 2005: Ein Engel für alle – Feueralarm
  - 2006: Ein Engel für alle – Der Riesenkerl
  - 2006: Krimi.de – Bitte recht freundlich!
  - 2008-2010: Schloss Einstein (150 episodes)

== Z ==
- Helena Zengel (born 2008)
  - 2013: Spreewaldkrimi: Mörderische Hitze
  - 2016: Looping
  - 2016–2017: Die Spezialisten – Im Namen der Opfer (2 episodes)
  - 2017: Der gute Bulle
  - 2017: Die Tochter
  - 2019: System Crasher
  - 2019: Inga Lindström: Familienfest in Sommerby
  - 2020: News of the World
  - 2021: A Christmas Number One
  - 2022: Tocotronic – Ich hasse es hier (music video)
  - 2023: Die Therapie
  - 2024: Transamazonia
  - 2025: The Legend of Ochi
  - 2025: Intimate (3 episodes)
- Sonja Ziemann (1926-2020)
  - 1940: Der Schatz
  - 1941: A Gust of Wind
  - 1943: Die Jungfern vom Bischofsberg
  - 1943: Geliebter Schatz
  - 1944: Eine kleine Sommermelodie
  - 1944: Hundstage
- Wolfgang Zilzer (1901–1991)
  - 1915: Der Barbier von Filmersdorf
  - 1915: Überlistet
  - 1916: Professor Erichsons Rivale
  - 1917: Die Spinne
  - 1917: Der Blusenkönig

== See also ==
- List of Germans
