= Theresa Scholze =

German actress

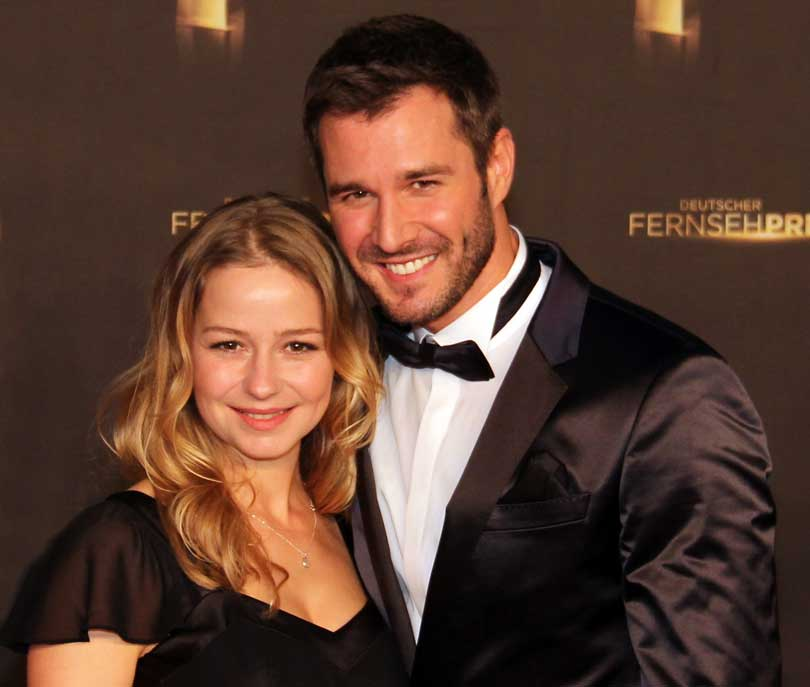
- Scholze with Jochen Schropp at the 2012 German Television Award gala
- Born: 11 February 1980 (age 45); Schmölln, East Germany
- Education: Bertolt-Brecht-Gymnasium; University of Music and Theatre Leipzig
- Occupation: Actress
- Spouse: Paul Thorsten Grasshoff
- Relatives: Jürgen Mai (father); Sabine Scholze (mother); Caroline Scholze (sister)
- Awards: Telestar: 1998 "Promotional Award for Best Newcomer Actress"

Theresa Scholze (born 11 February 1980 in Schmölln) is a German actress.

== Life ==
Scholze comes from a family of actors. Her grandparents Hildegard Schirrmeister and Heinz Scholze were actors. Her mother Sabine Scholze is a stage actress at the Hans Otto Theater in Potsdam, and her father Jürgen Mai, her sister Caroline Scholze, and her husband Paul Thorsten Grasshoff are also in the profession.

Born in Schmölln, Bezirk Leipzig, Scholze grew up in Brandenburg. She gained her first theater experience in the youth theater group of the Brandenburg Theater. After graduating from the Bertolt-Brecht-Gymnasium in Brandenburg an der Havel, Scholze completed an apprenticeship at the University of Music and Theatre Leipzig.

Scholze became known as an actress through her role as the daughter of coroner Robert Kolmaar in the television series Der letzte Zeuge (The Last Witness), for which she was awarded the Telestar as a young actress in 1998. She has been working in film, television, and theater. In the 2002-2003 season, she played a leading role in Quizoola! at the Schauspiel Leipzig, in 2003 in the satire play Ein Probeschuss für den Freischütz, and from 2003 to 2004 as Cordelia in King Lear at the Hans-Otto-Theater Potsdam.

From 2 March 2009 to 24 February 2010 she played the leading female role in the ZDF telenovela Alisa - Folge deinem Herzen (Alisa - Follow Your Heart). Jan Hartmann was the lead at her side. She shot for the telenovela from November 2008 to November 2009.

Since 2018, Scholze has played a leading role as lawyer Lisa Huber in the series Daheim in den Bergen (At Home In the Mountains).

Scholze is married. She lived in Cologne for six years before moving back to her old home in Potsdam.

== Filmography ==
- 1993, 2001: Wolffs Revier (TV series, various roles, 2 episodes)
- 1995: Schwarz greift ein (TV series, episode Durchgebrannt)
- 1996: Mensch, Pia! (TV series, 7 episodes)
- 1997: Für alle Fälle Stefanie (TV series, episode Zwei Mütter, eine Tochter)
- 1998: Derrick (TV series, episode Die Tochter des Mörders)
- 1998: Salto Kommunale (TV series, 2 episodes)
- 1998–2019: In aller Freundschaft (TV series, various roles, 3 episodes)
- 1998–2006: Der letzte Zeuge (TV series, 32 episodes)
- 1999: Sweet Little Sixteen
- 2000: Der Alte (TV series, episode Der Tod kam wie ein Fluch)
- 2000: Jugendsünde
- 2000: Für die Liebe ist es nie zu spät
- 2000: Das Geheimnis – Auf der Spur des Mörders
- 2000: Die Cleveren (TV series, episode Der Lebensretter)
- 2001: Eine öffentliche Affäre
- 2001: Julietta – Es ist nicht wie du denkst
- 2001: Doppelter Einsatz (TV series, episode Rache)
- 2001: Alarm für Cobra 11 (TV series, episode Tina und Aysim)
- 2002: Siska (TV series, episode Und dann hilft dir keiner mehr)
- 2002: Dr. Sommerfeld – Neues vom Bülowbogen (TV series, episode Ein gefährlicher Deal)
- 2002: Im Namen des Gesetzes (TV series, episode Anschlag bei Nacht)
- 2002–2016: SOKO Leipzig (TV series, various roles, 3 episodes)
- 2004: Die Kommissarin (TV series, episode Der Traum vom Glück)
- 2004: Unsolved (TV series, episode Leiche im Keller)
- 2005: Der Ermittler (TV series, episode Eiskalter Mord)
- 2005: Unser Charly (TV series, episode Blinde Liebe)
- 2005: Die Gerichtsmedizinerin (TV series, episode Die letzte Reise)
- 2005: Make Love, Not Fat
- 2005–2015: Coast Guard (TV series, various roles, 4 episodes)
- 2006: Four Windows
- 2006: Eine Chance für die Liebe
- 2006: Zwei Engel für Amor (TV series, 16 episodes)
- 2006: Großstadtrevier (TV series, episode Abgründe)
- 2007: Wiedersehen in Verona
- 2007: Wilsberg: Unter Anklage (TV series)
- 2008: Escape (Kurzfilm)
- 2008: Deadly Harvest
- 2008: Kreuzfahrt ins Glück – Madeira (TV series)
- 2008: Polizeiruf 110: Taximord (TV series)
- 2009–2010: Alisa – Folge deinem Herzen (TV series, 240 episodes)
- 2010: Emilie Richards: Denk nur an uns beide
- 2011: Das Traumschiff: Bora Bora (TV series)
- 2011: Rosamunde Pilcher: Verlobt, verliebt, verwirrt (TV series)
- 2012: Polizeiruf 110: Bullenklatschen
- 2012: A Small Thing
- 2012: Notruf Hafenkante (TV series, episode Karambolage, Teil 2)
- 2014: Danni Lowinski (TV series, 7 episodes)
- 2014: Die Chefin (TV series, episode Tod eines Lehrers)
- 2014: SOKO Köln (TV series, various roles, 2 episodes)
- 2014: Dr. Klein (TV series, episode Nach Hause)
- 2015: Marcel über den Dächern
- 2015: Lichtgestalten
- 2015: Kripo Holstein – Mord und Meer (TV series, episode Die blöde Kuh)
- 2015: Heldt (TV series, episode Summ mir das Lied vom Tod)
- 2015, 2020: In aller Freundschaft – Die jungen Ärzte (TV series, 2 episodes)
- 2015: Herzensbrecher – Vater von vier Söhnen (TV series, episode Mit Dank zurück)
- 2015: Kreisliga – Ein Dorf sieht schwarz
- 2016: Wilsberg: Tod im Supermarkt
- 2017: Der Staatsanwalt (TV series, episode Tyrannenmord)
- 2017: Der Bergdoktor (TV series, episode Blut und Wasser)
- 2017: Frau Temme sucht das Glück (TV series, 2 episodes)
- 2017: Zwei Bauern und kein Land
- 2017: Rentnercops (TV series, episode Uns trennt das Leben)
- 2017: Toter Winkel
- 2017: Frühling – Nichts gegen Papa (TV series)
- 2018: Bettys Diagnose (TV series, episode Mut zur Wahrheit)
- seit 2018: Daheim in den Bergen (TV series) → siehe Episodenliste
- 2019: Die Spezialisten – Im Namen der Opfer (TV series, episode Wut)
- 2019: Der Usedom-Krimi: Mutterliebe (TV series)
- 2020: SOKO Stuttgart (TV series, episode Burlesque)
- 2020: Morden im Norden (TV series, episode Kein Geld der Welt)
- 2021: Die Füchsin: Romeo muss sterben (TV series)

== Audio plays ==
- Dick Francis: Zügellos (Wild Horses). Radio play adaptation after the novel Zügellos. Adapted by Alexander Schnitzler. Directed by Klaus Zippel, Produced by MDR and SWR, 2002. Music by Pierre Oser. 1 CD, length approx. 71 min. Der Audio Verlag, Berlin 2003, ISBN 3-89813-26-6-8.

== Awards ==
- 1998: Telestar "Promotional Award for Best Newcomer Actress" for the role of Anna Kolmaar in Der letzte Zeuge
