= List of medical drama television programs =

This is a list of medical drama television programs.

== Africa ==
=== Kenya ===
- Saints (2011)

=== South Africa ===
- Binnelanders (2005–present)
- Jozi-H (2006–2007)
- Hillside (2006–2008)
- Vutha (2020)
- Durban Gen (2020–2023)
- Wounds (2021–2022)
- Hartklop (2023)

== Americas ==
=== Argentina ===
- Los Medicos de hoy (2000)
- Los Medicos de hoy 2 (2001)
- Locas de Amor (2004)
- Mujeres de Nadie (2007)
- El paraíso (2011)
- En terapia (2012)
- Tiempos Compulsivos (2012)

=== Brazil ===
- Mulher (1998 - 1999)
- A Cura (2010)
- Sob Pressão (2017–present)

=== Canada ===
- D4. Simon Locke (1971–1974)
- The Body in Question (1978–1979)
- Side Effects (1994–1996)
- Jozi-H (2006–2007)
- Bloodletting & Miraculous Cures (2010)
- Trauma (2010–2014)
- Combat Hospital (2011)
- Saving Hope (2012–2017)
- Hard Rock Medical (2013–2018)
- Emergency Room: Life + Death at VGH (2014–2017)
- Remedy (2014–2015)
- Keeping Canada Alive (2015–present)
- Mary Kills People (2017–2019)
- Coroner (2019–2022)
- Nurses (2020–2021)
- Transplant (2020–2024)
- SkyMed (2022–present)

=== Chile ===
- El milagro de vivir (1990).
- Urgencias (2005).
- Sin anestesia (2009).
- Vida por vida (2012).
- Pulseras Rojas: Chile (2014).

=== Colombia ===
- Mental (2009)
- A Corazón Abierto (Grey's Anatomy adaptation) (2010–2011)
- Mentiras perfectas (Nip/Tuck adaptation) (2013–2014)

=== Mexico ===
- A Corazón Abierto (Adaptation from Colombian version of Grey's Anatomy, 2011–2012)
- Rafaela (2011)

=== Peru ===
- Clave Uno: médicos en alerta (2009–2010)

=== United States ===
Name	Started	Ended
City Hospital	1951	1953
The Doctor	1952	1953
Medic	1954	1956
Dr. Hudson's Secret Journal	1955	1957
Dr. Christian	1956	1957
Diagnosis: Unknown	1960	1960
Dr. Kildare	1961	1966
Ben Casey	1961	1966
The Ordeal of Dr. Shannon	1962	1962
The Eleventh Hour	1962	1964
The Nurses	1962	1965
Breaking Point	1963	1964
The Bold Ones: The New Doctors	1969	1973
Medical Center	1969	1976
Marcus Welby, M.D.	1969	1976
The Interns	1970	1971
Matt Lincoln	1970	1971
Young Dr. Kildare	1972	1973
Emergency!	1972	1977
M*A*S*H	1972	1983
Doc Elliot	1973	1974
Doctors' Hospital	1975	1976
Medical Story	1975	1976
Quincy, M.E.	1976	1983
Rafferty	1977	1977
Westside Medical	1977	1977
Julie Farr, M.D.	1978	1978
Trapper John, M.D.	1979	1986
Nurse	1981	1982
St. Elsewhere	1982	1988
Ryan's Four	1983	1983
Cutter to Houston	1983	1983
Trauma Center	1983	1983
Kay O'Brien	1986	1986
Buck James	1987	1988
Hothouse	1988	1988
China Beach	1988	1991
HeartBeat	1988	1989
Nightingales	1989	1989
Island Son	1989	1990
Lifestories	1990	1990
The Human Factor	1992	1992
Diagnosis: Murder	1993	2001
Birdland	1994	1994
Chicago Hope	1994	2000
ER	1994	2009
University Hospital	1995	1995
Medicine Ball	1995	1995
Crisis Center	1997	1997
Port Charles	1997	2003
L.A. Doctors	1998	1999
Mercy Point	1998	1999
Rescue 77	1999	1999
Providence	1999	2002
Wonderland	2000	2000
City of Angels	2000	2000
Gideon's Crossing	2000	2001
Strong Medicine	2000	2006
All Souls	2001	2001
Doc	2001	2004
Crossing Jordan	2001	2007
Scrubs	2001	2010
Body & Soul	2002	2002
MDs	2002	2002
Presidio Med	2002	2003
Everwood	2002	2006
Nip/Tuck	2003	2010
Kingdom Hospital	2004	2004
Medical Investigation	2004	2005
Dr. Vegas	2004	2006
House	2004	2012
Grey's Anatomy	2005	Present
Inconceivable	2005	2005
Saved	2006	2006
3 lbs	2006	2008
Heartland	2007	2007
General Hospital: Night Shift	2007	2008
Private Practice	2007	2013
In Treatment	2008	2021
Mental	2009	2009
Trauma	2009	2010
Mercy	2009	2010
Three Rivers	2009	2010
Hawthorne	2009	2011
Nurse Jackie	2009	2015
Royal Pains	2009	2016
Miami Medical	2010	2010
Past Life	2010	2010
Off the Map	2011	2011
Combat Hospital	2011	2011
A Gifted Man	2011	2012
Body of Proof	2011	2013
Hart of Dixie	2011	2015
Chicago Fire	2012	Present
Emily Owens, M.D.	2012	2013
The Mob Doctor	2012	2013
Monday Mornings	2013	2013
Do No Harm	2013	2013
Masters of Sex	2013	2016
Black Box	2014	2014
Rush	2014	2014
Forever	2014	2015
The Knick	2014	2015
Sirens	2014	2015
Red Band Society	2014	2015
The Night Shift	2014	2017
Chicago Med	2015	Present
Complications	2015	2015
Dig	2015	2015
Proof	2015	2015
Rosewood	2015	2017
Code Black	2015	2018
iZombie	2015	2019
Heartbeat	2016	2016
Chance	2016	2016
Mercy Street	2016	2017
Pure Genius	2016	2017
The Good Doctor	2017	2024
The Resident	2018	2023
9-1-1	2018	Present
New Amsterdam	2018	2023
Station 19	2018	2024
Virgin River	2019	Present
Almost Family	2019	2020
Tacoma FD	2019	2023
Transplant	2020	2024
9-1-1: Lone Star	2020	2025
Nurses	2020	2022
Ratched	2020	2020
Dr. Death	2021	2023
Good Sam	2022	2022
Fire Country	2022	Present
Rescue: HI-Surf	2024	2025
Doctor Odyssey	2024	2025
Watson	2025	2026
Doc	2025	Present
9-1-1: Nashville	2025	Present
The Pitt	2025	Present
Brilliant Minds	2024	2026
St. Denis Medical	2024	Present

== Asia ==
=== Bangladesh ===
- Basto Dakter (2004)
- Doctor Jamai (2013)
- Poshu Doctor
- Vondo Doctor (2014)
- Abul Doctor (2014)
- Bahadur Doctor

=== China ===
- The Young Doctor (2014)
- OB-Gyns (2014–2015)
- Surgeons (2017)
- Children's Hospital Pediatrician (2017)
- Healer of Children (2020)
- Thank you Doctor (2022)
- Live Surgery Room (2024)

=== Hong Kong ===
- Heartstrings (1994)
- Healing Hands (1998)
- Healing Hands II (2000)
- Placebo Cure (2003)
- The White Flame (2004)
- The Last Breakthrough (2004)
- Healing Hands III (2005)
- The Hippocratic Crush (2012)
- A Great Way to Care I and II (2011, 2013)
- The Hippocratic Crush II (2013)
- Angel In-the-Making (2015)
- The Last Healer in Forbidden City (2016)
- Big White Duel (2019)
- Kids' Lives Matter (2021)
- Big White Duel 2 (2022)

=== India ===
- Lifeline (1989)
- Sanjeevani (2002)
- Ayushmaan (2004)
- Dhadkan (2004)
- Dill Mill Gayye (2007)
- Ekhane Aakash Neel (2008)
- Kuch Toh Log Kahenge (2011)
- Shanthi Nilayam (2012–2013)
- Uyirmei (2014–2015)
- Zindagi Wins (2015)
- Ek Nayi Ummeed - Roshni (2015)
- Savitri Devi College & Hospital (2017–2018)
- Anjali (2017)
- Sanjeevani (2019)
- Ekhane Aakash Neel Season 2 (2019)
- Jigarbaaz (2020–2021)
- Dhadkan Zindaggi Kii (2021–2022)
- Human (2022)
- Dr. Aarambhi (2026)
- Hui Gumm Yaadein – Ek Doctor, Do Zindagiyaan (2026)
- 108 Base Hospital: Uri (2026)

=== Indonesia ===
- Pelangi Harapan (2002–2003)
- Pelangi Harapan 2 (2003–2004)
- Cerita Dokter Cinta (2019)
- Sekotengs (2024)

=== Israel ===
- BeTipul (2005–2008)
- Magen David Darom (2019–)

=== Japan ===
- Kyumei Byoutou 24-ji (1999, 2001, 2005, 2009)
- Shiroi Kyotō (2003)
- Dr. Coto's Clinic (2003–2006)
- Iryu: Team Medical Dragon (2006–07, 2010)
- Code Blue (2008, 2010)
- Team Batista no Eikō (2008)
- GodHand Teru (2009)
- Jin (2009–2011)
- General Rouge no Gaisen (2010)
- Saijou-no-Meii (2011)
- Doctor-X: Surgeon Michiko Daimon (2012–present)
- Clinic on the Sea (2013)
- Iryu: Team Medical Dragon (2014)
- A LIFE (2017)
- Koi wa Tsuzuku yo Doko Made mo (2020)
- Doctor's Affairs
- The Good Doctor (2018)
- Veterinarian Dolittle
- Sakanoue Animal Clinic Story

=== Malaysia ===
- Ampang Medikal
- Cinta Medik
- Medik TV

=== North Korea ===
- Our Warm House (2000)

=== Pakistan ===
- Dhoop Kinarey (PTV) (around the 1980s)
- Emergency Ward (PTV) (around the 1980s)
- Ambulance (Indus TV) (2005)
- Teray Pehlu May (Geo Ent) (2009–present)
- Yaqeen Ka Safar (Hum TV) (2017)
- Life Line (See TV) (2017)

=== Philippines ===
- Habang May Buhay (2010) [ABS-CBN]
- Altapresyon (2012) [TV5]
- Obsession (2014) [TV5]
- Sa Puso ni Dok (2014) [GMA Network]
- Abot-Kamay na Pangarap (2022–2024) [GMA Network]

=== Singapore ===
- First Touch
- Making Miracles
- A Child's Hope
- The Oath (TV series)
- Vallamai Tharayo (Tamil Language)

=== South Korea ===
- General Hospital (1995)
- Medical Brothers (1997)
- Sunflower (1998)
- Hur Jun (1999)
- Medical Center (2000)
- Dae Jang Geum (2003)
- Thank You (2007)
- White Tower (2007)
- New Heart (2007)
- Surgeon Bong Dal-hee (2007)
- Before and After: Plastic Surgery Clinic (2008)
- General Hospital 2 (2008)
- OB & GY (2010)
- Brain (2011)
- Syndrome (2012)
- Time Slip Dr. Jin (2012)
- Golden Time (2012)
- The 3rd Hospital (2012)
- Faith (2012 TV series) (2012)
- The King's Doctor (2012)
- Good Doctors (2013)
- Medical Top Team (2013)
- Emergency Couple (2014)
- Angel Eyes (2014)
- Doctor Stranger (2014)
- It's Okay, That's Love (2014)
- Kill Me, Heal Me (2015)
- Blood (2015)
- Yong-pal (2015)
- D-Day (2015)
- Descendants of the Sun (2016)
- The Doctors (2016)
- A Beautiful Mind (2016)
- Dr. Romantic (2016)
- W (2016)
- Hospital Ship (2017)
- Live Up to Your Name, Dr. Heo (2017)
- Cross (2017–2018)
- A Poem a Day (2018)
- Investigation Couple (2018)
- Heart Surgeons (2018)
- Doctor Prisoner (2019)
- Doctor John (2019)
- Doctor Detective (2019)
- Dr. Romantic 2 (2020)
- Hospital Playlist (2020)
- Ghost Doctor (2022)
- The Trauma Code: Heroes on Call (2025)

=== Taiwan ===
- The Hospital (2006)
- Will Being Love (2009)
- High Heels And A Scalpel (2014)
- Wake Up (TV series) (2015)
- Wake Up 2 (2017)
- The Coordinators (2019)
- Light Of Cloudy Day (2019)
- A Fool Like Me (2020)
- Luo Que (2020)

=== Thailand ===
- Thara Himalaya (2012) [Channel 3]
- Khun Chai Puttipat (2013) [Channel 3]
- My Ambulance (2019) [One 31]

== Europe ==
=== Russia ===
- Интерны (2014)
- дело врачей (2013) NTV (Russia)
- кровинушка (2012) TV Russia-1
- Дневник доктора Зайцевой(2012) CTC Media
- Личные обстоятельства (2012) Channel One Russia
- Военный госпиталь (2012) TV Russia-1
- Женский доктор (2012) Кинокомпания FILM.UA
- Страна 03 (2012)
- Склифосовский (2012) кинокомпания «русское»
- Лист ожидания (2012) Кинокомпания FILM.UA
- Верное средство (2012) REN TV
- Самара (2012) СТБ
- Сердце Марии (2011)
- Попытка Веры (2010) Channel One Russia
- Земский доктор (2010) TV Russia-1
- Судмедэксперты (2010) Всемирные русские студии
- Практика (2016) Channel One Russia
- Лучшие врачи (2015) NTV (Russia)
- Дежурный ангел (2013) ТВ-3
- Тест на беременность (2015) Channel One Russia
- Врач (2010)
- Доктор Тырса (2010) Epic Media
- Общая терапия (2008) Channel One Russia
- Я лечу (2008) STS (TV channel)
- Знахарь (2008) NTV (Russia)
- Служба доверия (2007)
- Личная жизнь доктора Селивановой (2007)

=== Croatia ===
- Hitna 94 / Emergency 94 (2008)

=== Czech Republic ===
- Nemocnice na kraji města (1977–1981)
- Sanitka (1984–1985)
- Nemocnice na kraji města po dvaceti letech (2003)
- Ordinace v růžové zahradě (2005–present)
- Nemocnice na kraji města - nové osudy (2008)
- Zázraky života (2010)
- Sanitka 2 (2013)
- Doktor Martin (2015–2018)
- Doktoři z Počátků (2013–2016)
- Modrý Kód (2017–2020)
- Sestřičky (2020–present)

=== Denmark ===
- The Kingdom (1994–1997)
- SYGEPLEJESKOLEN (The New Nurses) [2018]

=== Bulgaria ===
- Stolen Life (2016–present)

=== Finland ===
- Ihmeidentekijät (1996–1998)
- Parhaat vuodet (2000, 2002)
- Syke (2014–)
- Ihon alla (2016)

=== France ===
- Médecins de nuit (1978–1986)
- Janique Aimée
- Petit docteur
- Les pédiatres
- Équipe médicale d'urgence

=== Georgia/Sakartvelo ===
- Suburban Girl MedER (2010–2012)
- Clinical Death (2014)
- Artificial Breathing (2016–present)

=== Germany/Austria ===
- Die Schwarzwaldklinik (1985–1989)
- Der Landarzt (1986–2012)
- Praxis Bülowbogen (1987–1996)
- Der Bergdoktor (1992–1997)
- Hallo, Onkel Doc! (1994–2000)
- Dr. Stefan Frank – Der Arzt, dem die Frauen vertrauen (1995–2001)
- Für alle Fälle Stefanie (1995–2005)
- Alphateam – Die Lebensretter im OP (1996–2005)
- Die Rettungsflieger (1997–2007)
- St. Angela (1997–2004)
- Dr. Sommerfeld – Neues vom Bülowbogen (1997–2004)
- Medicopter 117 – Jedes Leben zählt (1997–2002)
- In aller Freundschaft (1998–present)
- Familie Dr. Kleist (2004–present)
- Doctor's Diary (2007–2010)
- Doktor Martin (2007–2009)
- Der Bergdoktor (2008–present)
- Add a Friend (2012–2014)
- Dr. Klein (2014–2016)
- Bettys Diagnose (2015–present)
- Charité at War (2019)
- Berlin ER (2025)

=== Greece ===
- Iatriko Aporrito (2009–2010)
- Kliniki Periptosi

=== Italy ===
- La dottoressa Giò (1997–1998, 2019)
- Un medico in famiglia (1998–2016)
- Una donna per amico (1998–2001)
- Incantesimo (1998–2008)
- In Treatment (2013–2017)
- Medicina generale (2007–2010)
- Nati ieri (2006–2007)
- Chirurgia d’urgenza (2008)
- Crimini Bianchi (2008–2009)
- Medici Miei (2008)
- Terapia d'urgenza (2009)
- Braccialetti Rossi (2014–2016)
- L'allieva (2016–2020)
- Doc - Nelle tue mani (2020–present)
- Fino all'ultimo battito (2021)

=== The Netherlands/Belgium ===
- Memorandum van een dokter (1963–1965)
- Spoed (2000–2008)
- Trauma 24/7 (2002–2003)
- IC (2002–2006)
- De co-assistent (2007–2010)
- Dokters (2012–2013)
- Dokter Deen (2012–2018)
- Dokter Tinus (2012)
- Echte Verhalen: De Kliniek (2013–2014)
- De mannen van dokter Anne (2016)
- Project Orpheus (2016)
- Centraal Medisch Centrum (2016–2018)
- Dag & Nacht (2023–present)
- De Poli (2023)
- Medisch Centrum West (1988–1994, 2025–present)

=== Norway ===
- Valkyrien (2017–present)

=== Poland ===
- Doktor Ewa (1971)
- Układ krążenia (1977–1978)
- Na dobre i na złe (1999–present)
- Szpital na perypetiach (2001–2003)
- Daleko od noszy (2003–2010)
- Lekarze (2012–2014)
- Szpital (2013–2020)
- Na Sygnale (2014–present)
- Pielęgniarki (2014–2016)
- Diagnoza (2017–2019)
- Lekarze na start (2017)

=== Portugal ===
- Maternidade (2011–2013)
- Médico de Família (1998–2000)
- Sinais de Vida (2013–2014)

=== Ireland ===
- The Clinic (2003–2009)
- Whistleblower (2008)

=== Serbia ===
- Urgentni centar (ER adaptation) (2014–2021)

=== Slovakia ===
- Nemocnice na kraji města (1977–1981)
- Ordinácia v ružovej záhrade (2007)
- Dr. Ludsky (2011)
- Dr. Dokonalý (2012–2013)
- Doktori (2014)
- Doktor Martin (2015–2018)
- Sestričky (2018–present)

=== Spain ===
- Doctor Mateo (2009–2011)
- Hospital Central (2000–present)
- Médico de familia (1995-199?)
- Centro Médico (2015–present)
- Pulseras Rojas (2012–2013)
- Respira (2024–present)

=== Sweden ===
- Unga läkare (2012)
- Syrror (2016)

=== Turkey ===
- Doktorlar (Grey's Anatomy adaptation) (2006–2011)
- Sen de Gitme (2011–2012)
- Merhaba Hayat (Private Practice adaptation) (2012–2013)
- Hayat Yolunda (2014)
- Acil Servis (ER adaptation) (2015)
- Acil Aşk Aranıyor (2014–2015)
- 112 Acil (2017)
- Kalp Atışı (Doctors adaptation) (2017–2018)
- Mucize Doktor (The Good Doctor adaptation) (2019–2021)
- Hekimoğlu (TV series) (House M.D. adaptation) (2019–2021)
- Hayat Bugün (New Amsterdam adaptation) (2022)
- Kasaba Doktoru (Dr. Romantic adaptation) (2022–2023)
- Hayatımın Neşesi (2023)
- Bahar (Doctor Cha adaptation) (2024)

=== United Kingdom ===
- Emergency Ward 10 (1957–1967)
- Police Surgeon (1960)
- Dr. Finlay's Casebook (1962–1971)
- The Doctors (1969–1971)
- General Hospital (1972–1979)
- Angels (1975–1983)
- The District Nurse (1984–1987)
- A Very Peculiar Practice (1986–1992)
- Casualty (1986–present)
- Children's Ward (1989–2000)
- Medics (1990–1995)
- Doctor Finlay (1993–1996)
- Peak Practice (1993–2002)
- Cardiac Arrest (1994–1996)
- Bramwell (1995–1999)
- Silent Witness (1996–present)
- Picking Up the Pieces (1998)
- Holby City (1999–2022)
- Always and Everyone (1999–2002)
- Doctors (2000–2024)
- The Royal (2003–2011)
- Casualty@Holby City (2004–2005)
- Bodies (2004–2006)
- No Angels (2004–2006)
- Doc Martin (2004–2022)
- Green Wing (2004–2007)
- The Royal Today (2008)
- Crash (2009–2010)
- Getting On (2009–2012)
- The Indian Doctor (2010–2013)
- Sirens (2011)
- Monroe (2011–2012)
- Call the Midwife (2012–present)
- Critical (2015)
- Doctor Foster (2015–2017)
- Trust Me (2017)
- Trauma (2018–present)
- Bloods (2021–2022)
- This Is Going To Hurt (2022)

== Oceania ==
=== Australia ===
- Emergency (1959)
- The Young Doctors (1976–1983)
- A Country Practice (1981–1994)
- The Flying Doctors (1985–1991)
- G.P. (1989–1996)
- Children's Hospital (1997–1998)
- Medivac (1996–1998)
- All Saints (1998–2009)
- MDA (2002–2003, 2005)
- The Surgeon (2005)
- Offspring (2010–2017)
- Reef Doctors(2013)
- Doctor Doctor (2016–2021)
- RFDS: Royal Flying Doctor Service (2021–present)

=== New Zealand ===
- A Country GP (1984–1985)
- Shortland Street (1992–present)
- Mercy Peak (2001–2004)
