= Susanna Capurso =

Italian actress (born 1958)

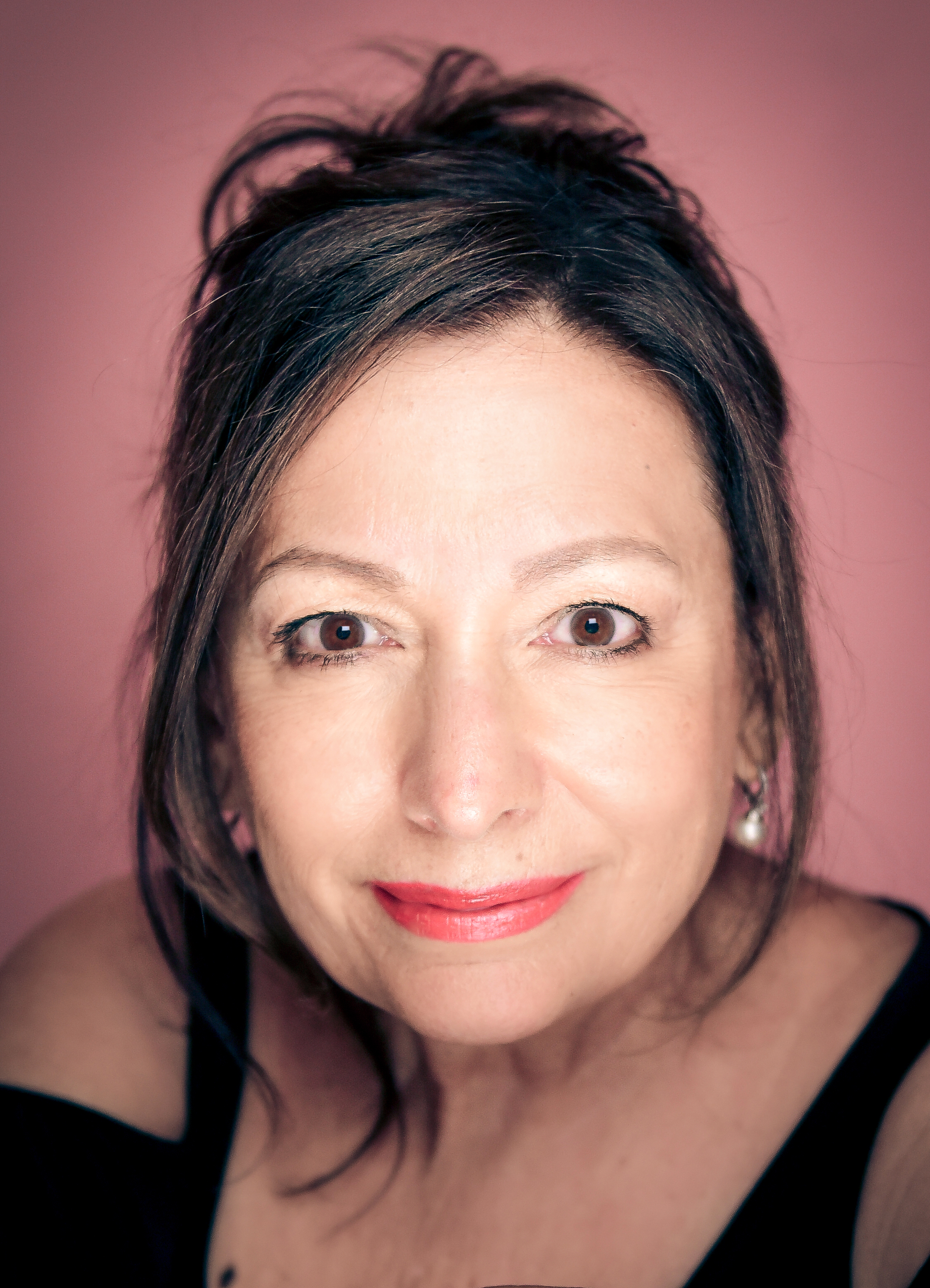
- Born: 17 January 1958 (age 67); Barletta, Apulia, Italy
- Occupation: Actress
- Children: 1

Susanna Capurso (born 17 January 1958) is an Italian actress who works mainly in Germany. She is best known for the role of Sabrina Buchstab-Scholz in the German television series Lindenstraße.

== Career ==
After international theater roles (including in France, Italy, Poland and Chile), Capurso made her German TV debut under the direction of Christian Quadflieg with Ein unvergessliches Wochenende in Venedig. In Germany, she was best known for her role as Sabrina Buchstab, later Scholz in the television series Lindenstraße, which she portrayed from 2005 to 2012.

She had theater engagements, among others. at the Komödie am Kurfürstendamm, at the Kammerspiele and at the Freie Volksbühne Berlin. In addition to Lindenstraße, she starred in TV series such as Cologne P.D. as Donatella Fiori, Für alle Fälle Stefanie, Neues vom Bülowbogen and in the TV comedies Die oder keine and Ein Banker zum Verhaben. In Alisa – Folge deinem Herzen, she portrayed the role of Francesca Bertani from episodes 66 to 75.

== Partial filmography ==
- 2002: Swept Away
- 2010: Letters to Juliet
- 2015: Die Rosenheim-Cops
- 2015: Monaco 110
- 2018: Urlaub mit Mama
- 2020: Bettys Diagnose

== Personal life ==
Capurso is married and has a son from her first marriage to fellow actor Michael Kausch. She currently resides in Berlin.
