= Capurso (surname) =

Capurso is an Italian surname. Notable people with the surname include:

- Marta Capurso (born 1980), Italian short track speed skater
- Susanna Capurso (born 1958), Italian actress
