= 79 A.D. =

1962 film

79 A.D. The Destruction of Herculaneum
- Directed by: Gianfranco Parolini
- Written by: Gianfranco Parolini; Giovanni Simonelli
- Starring: Brad Harris; Fulvia Gasser; Mara Lane
- Cinematography: Francesco Izzarelli
- Edited by: Edmondo Lozzi
- Music by: Carlo Franci
- Release date: 1962
- Running time: 113 minute
- Countries: Italy; France
- Language: Italian

79 A.D. (Italian: Anno 79 - La distruzione di Ercolano, French: Les derniers jours d'Herculanum, also known as The Destruction of Herculaneum) is a 1962 Italian-French epic drama film written and directed by Gianfranco Parolini and starring Brad Harris.

== Summary ==
General Marcus Tiberius, Emperor Titus Flavius's nephew, triumphantly returns to Rome only to discover the city in chaos. Street murders are escalating, and some corrupt members of the Roman Senate are falsely accusing the Christian community. When ordered to act against the Christians, Marcus defies the command, leading his uncle to strip him of titles and exile him. Undeterred, Marcus resolves to investigate independently. Amidst the romance and political intrigue of the emperor's court in A.D. 79, a looming disaster unfolds. Beneath the shadow of Mount Vesuvius, the city faces imminent destruction alongside Herculaneum.

== Cast ==
- Brad Harris as Marcus Tiberius
- Mara Lane as Diomira
- Susan Paget as Livia
- Jany Clair as Myrta
- Jacques Berthier as Tercius
- Philippe Hersent as Tito Flavio
- Carlo Tamberlani as Furio
- Ivy Holzer as Claudia
- Isarco Ravaioli as Licinio
- Đorđe Nenadović as Samson
- Niksa Stefanini as Valerio
- Vladimir Leib as Lepido
- Ignazio Dolce
