= Mara Lane =

British-Austrian actress (1930–2014)

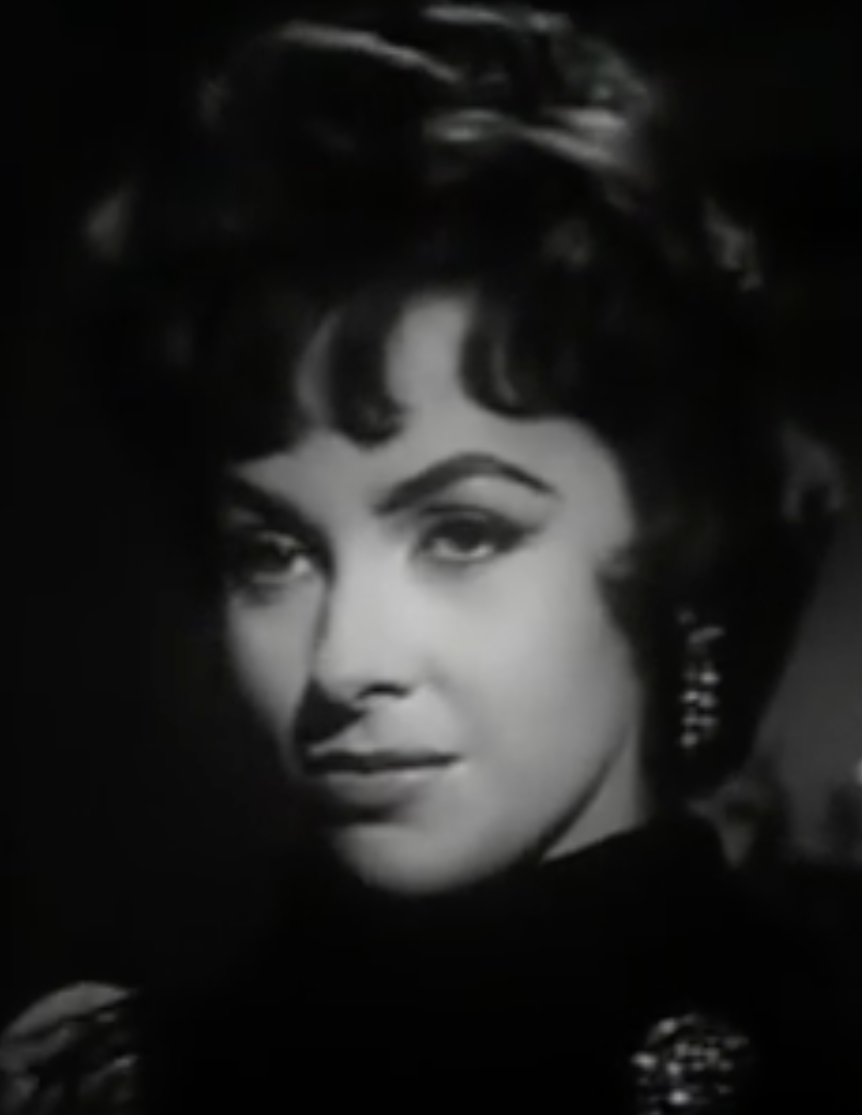
- Lane in Uomini ombra (1954)
- Born: Dorothy Bolton; 1 August 1930; Vienna, Austria
- Died: 6 August 2014 (aged 84); Marbella, Spain
- Occupation: Actor
- Years active: 1951–1965
- Relatives: Jocelyn Lane (sister)

Mara Lane (born Dorothy Bolton; 1 August 1930 – 6 August 2014) was an Austrian-British actress. She appeared in more than 30 films from 1951 to 1965.

== Life and career ==
Lane was born in Vienna, Austria. She is the eldest daughter of Russian-born pianist mother Olga Mironova and English father Briton John Bolton, who worked for an American oil firm; he later died in a car crash in the U.S.A. Her youngest sister is the actress Jocelyn Lane.

Lane's high school education came in New York, and she attended Marguerite Bourgeois College in Montreal, Canada.

Lane died in Marbella, Spain on 6 August 2014, at the age of 84.

== Selected filmography ==
Year	Title	Role	Notes
1964	The World Revolves Around You	Baby Bird	
1962	The Old Testament	Diotima	
1962	79 A.D.	Diomira	
1961	What Is Father Doing in Italy?	Nadja Lamar	
1958	Ooh... diese Ferien	Baby 'Boronin'	
1958	Peter Voss, Thief of Millions	Monique	
1957	Love from Paris	Nadine	
1956	The Tour Guide of Lisbon	Mercedes	
1955	Sins of Casanova	Barbara	
1955	Angela	Angela Towne	
1954	Susan Slept Here	Marilyn	
1953	Innocents in Paris	Gloria Delaney	
1953	Decameron Nights	Girl in Villa	
1952	24 Hours of a Woman's Life	Alice Brown	
1952	Treasure Hunt	Yvonne	
1951	Hell Is Sold Out	Midinette	
