= Big Request Concert =

1960 film directed by Arthur Maria Rabenalt

- German: Das große Wunschkonzert
- Directed by: Arthur Maria Rabenalt
- Written by: Felix Lützkendorf; Rolf Olsen
- Produced by: Richard Deutsch
- Starring: Carlos Thompson
- Release date: 19 December 1960
- Running time: 86 minutes
- Country: Austria
- Language: German

Big Request Concert (German: Das große Wunschkonzert) is a 1960 Austrian family film directed by Arthur Maria Rabenalt. It was entered into the 2nd Moscow International Film Festival.

== Cast ==
- Carlos Thompson as René von Geldern
- Linda Christian as Vilma Cortini
- Edmund Purdom as Harry Mell
- Ingeborg Schöner as Inge Salinger
- Eva Ingeborg Scholz as Barbara
- Lotte Lang as Frau Sedlacek
- Rudolf Schock as Sänger, himself
- Elke Aberle as Susi von Geldern
- Heinz Weiss as Stefan
- Rolf Olsen as Bruno Engel
- Richard Eybner as Prof. Warwenka
- Walter Varndal as Prof. Berger

== Reception ==
Variety called it "below average" with "a cliche-ridden script, oozing with native sentiment, leisurely directed and casually edited."
