= Die Rettungsflieger =

- Also known as: The Air Rescue Team
- Genre: Medical drama
- Created by: Dr. Rainer Berg
- Composer: Axel Donner
- Country of origin: Germany
- Original language: German
- No. of seasons: 11
- No. of episodes: 108 + 1 pilot movie

Production
- Running time: 45 minutes, pilot movie 90 minutes
- Production company: Studio Hamburg Produktion GmbH

Original release
- Network: ZDF
- Release: 15 February 1997 – 11 July 2007

Die Rettungsflieger (English:The Air Rescue Team) is a TV series in which fictitious missions of a rescue helicopter are displayed. The series, which was produced by Studio Hamburg and premiered by ZDF from 1997 to 2007, tries to preserve the closeness to reality in some aspects despite the undisputed entertainment character of the presentation.

The crew of SAR 71 consists of a pilot, a technical on board (TOB), a doctor and a nurse.

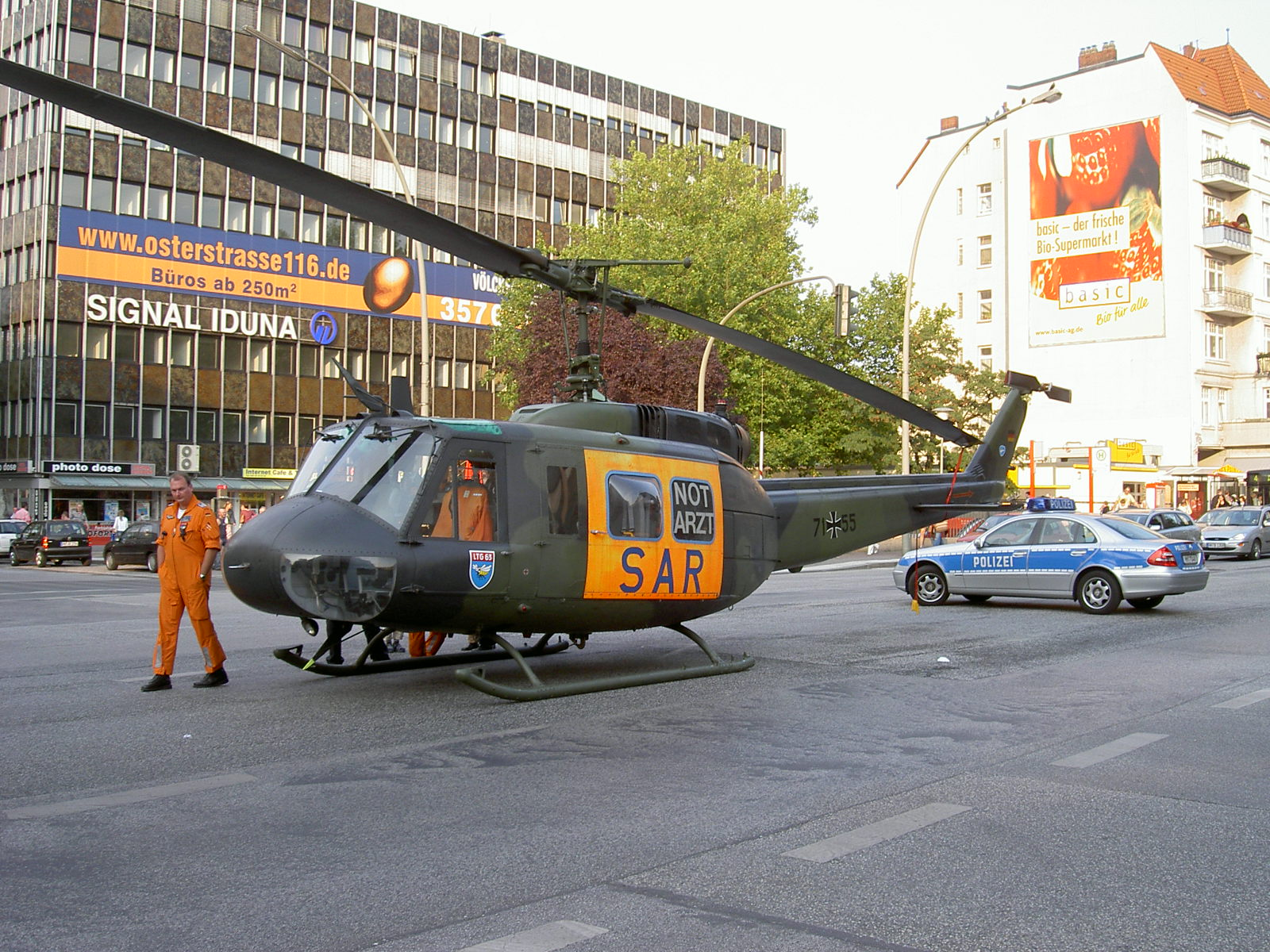

== See also ==
- List of German television series
