= Four Windows =

2006 German drama film by Christian Moris Müller

- Directed by: Christian Moris Müller
- Written by: Christian Moris Müller
- Produced by: Philipp Budweg
- Starring: Theresa Scholze; Thorsten Merten; Margarita Broich; Frank Droese
- Cinematography: Jürgen Jürges
- Edited by: Maja Stieghorst
- Music by: Chandra Fleig; Annette Focks
- Production companies: schlicht und ergreifend Filmproduktion; Hochschule für Fensehen und Film München
- Distributed by: missingFilms
- Release date: 2006
- Running time: 80 minutes
- Country: Germany
- Language: German

Four Windows (German: Vier Fenster) is a 2006 German drama film written and directed by Christian Moris Müller. The film premiered at the 56th Berlin International Film Festival winning the Franz Hofer Prize - Fimhaus Award, and was later released in German theaters and internationally on various platforms.

== Plot ==
Four Windows deconstructs the image of a "perfectly normal" family. The same fragment of everyday life is told in four chapters—each from the perspective of the father, mother, son, and daughter—revealing the isolation of each family member. Their interactions have long turned into a masquerade, and the parents' and children's attempts to seek the closeness they lack from strangers only drive them further back into themselves.

== Awards ==
- Franz Hofer Prize - Filmhaus Award (2006)

== Reception ==
The film received generally positive reviews from German critics. Reviewers highlighted its distinctive visual style, the atmospheric camera work by Jürgen Jürges, and Christian Moris Müller's deliberate, minimalist direction.

Dietmar Kammerer of Die Tageszeitung noted that Müller "opted for long, unbroken takes (cinematography by Jürgen Jürges) to 'give each of the characters space to unfold within the viewer.' It might have been even more compelling had the screenplay allowed the same space for its characters. In the end, there remains a glimmer of hope and a step into the open as the two siblings finally start to talk."

Verena Friederike Hasel of Der Tagesspiegel observed that "all these attempts at love are captured by Jürgen Jürges's camera in a haunting way, with long sequence shots that include what other films leave out—even small bumps in a shopping mall—and with framing that powerfully reflects the characters' sense of isolation. Rarely do we see a character close up and frontally; the camera keeps its distance, stays in the hallway when someone has already disappeared into the bathroom, often partially obscured by doors or walls."

Ralf Schenk of Berliner Zeitung wrote that "together with his cinematographer Jürgen Jürges, Müller departs from any form of naturalism and tells the story in a strictly stylized way, through long, grueling takes. Four Windows is a film of half-open doors, offering glimpses into each character's secrets without any voyeuristic gratification. Outbursts of helpless violence are more sensed than seen.

Oliver Rahayel of Filmdienst commented that "the director does not aim merely to portray the lack of communication as a metaphor for broken relationships. Nor does he produce overly weighty, but rather deliberately trivial dialogues that serve to avoid silence—yet are always carried by subtext expressed through glances. This is, without doubt, one of the film's strengths. Müller does not make access to his debut feature easy; he gives a great deal of space to pure observation and to simply following his characters. The images, however, have undeniable quality—after all, Müller was able to enlist Jürgen Jürges for the cinematography."
