= Elke Aberle =

German actress

- Born: 1 July 1950 (age 75); Neuss, West Germany
- Occupations: Film actress; Television actress
- Years active: 1955–2006

Elke Aberle (born 1 July 1950) is a German actress. Aberle is particularly known for her early work, as a child actress. She received a Bambi Award in 1965.

== Selected filmography ==
- Love (1956)
- Widower with Five Daughters (1957)
- Bimbo the Great (1958)
- Ludmila (1958)
- Father, Mother and Nine Children (1958)
- Ooh... diese Ferien (1958)
- Big Request Concert (1960)
- What Is Father Doing in Italy? (1961)
- Das Lamm (1964)
- Girls Behind Bars (1965)
- Who Laughs Last, Laughs Best (1971)
- Schwarzwaldfahrt aus Liebeskummer (1974)
- Henry IV (1975, TV film)
- I Only Want You to Love Me (1976, TV film)
- Anton, zieh die Bremse an! (1976, TV film)
- Tatort: Zürcher Früchte (1978, TV series episode)
- Tatort: Bier vom Fass (1989, TV series episode)
- Von der Liebe und den Zwängen: Mutmaßungen über Fassbinders 'Ich will doch nur, daß ihr mich liebt' (2010)
