= Faye Montana =

German actress, video producer, and presenter

- Born: Faye Montana Briest; 6 September 2003 (age 22)
- Occupations: Actress, video producer, and presenter
- Years active: 2009–present

Faye Montana (born 6 September 2003) is a German actress, video producer and presenter.

== Life ==
Faye Montana's parents are the actress Anne-Sophie Briest and the late rapper Markus Oergel ("Big Sal"), founding member of the hip-hop group Harleckinz. Montana operates a YouTube channel with approximately 340,000 subscribers. On 7 April 2017, Faye released her first single, titled Numbers. Shortly after, on 21 April, the track appeared on the YouTube channel Digster Pop. The song reached over 6 million views on YouTube by August 2021.

In July 2017, mvg Verlag published the 2017-2018 student calendar by Faye Montana.

== Filmography ==
- 2009: Zweiohrküken (Rabbit Without Ears 2)
- 2010: Inga Lindström – episode Prinzessin des Herzens (Princess of the Heart)
- 2013: Polizeiruf 110 (Police Call 110) – episode Fischerkrieg
- 2016: Kreuzfahrt ins Glück (Cruise to Happiness) – episode Hochzeitsreise an die Loire (Honeymoon to the Loire)
- 2016: Brief an mein Leben (Letter to My Life)
- 2017: Hanni & Nanni 4

== Discography ==
- 2017: Numbers (music video)
- 2018: Der beste Tag in Trolls: Die Party geht weiter! (Dreamworks Trolls: The Beat Goes On!)
- 2018: Red (cover)
- 2018: Wie ich bin (How I Am) (for the film Liliane Susewind (Little Miss Dolittle))
- 2019: Sue me (cover)
- 2019: New version of the German theme song from Miraculous – Geschichten von Ladybug und Cat Noir
- 2020: Heather (cover)
- 2020: Someday at Christmas (cover)
- 2021: Rock Me Down (music video)

== Presenter ==
- 2015–2016: Das Spiel beginnt! (The Game Begins!)

== Publications ==
- Die Freundinnen-Challenge (The Girlfriend Challenge), co-authored with Emma Schweiger in 2019. ISBN 978-3961290949
