= Ooh... diese Ferien =

1958 film

- Directed by: Franz Antel
- Written by: John Andersen (writer)
- Starring: See below
- Cinematography: Hans Heinz Theyer
- Edited by: Arnfried Heyne
- Music by: Johannes Fehring
- Release date: 1958
- Running time: 104 minutes
- Country: Austria
- Language: German

Ooh… diese Ferien is a 1958 Austrian film directed by Franz Antel.

The plot is set in Italy. The script was originally written in German and the music was composed by Johannes Fehring. The film is 104 minutes long and was shot in color.

== Cast ==
- Heidi Brühl as Monika Petermann
- Georg Thomalla as Max Petermann
- Hannelore Bollmann as Brigitte "Biggi" Petermann
- Mara Lane as Baby die "Baronin"
- Michael Cramer as Willi Boltz
- C.W. Fernbach as Direktor Antonowitsch
- Rolf Olsen as Otto Muffler
- Elke Aberle as Stupsi Petermann
- Ossi Wanka as Andi Petermann
- Hans Moser as Großvater Seidelbast
