= Meine wunderbare Familie =

German television series

- Starring: Tanja Wedhorn
- Country of origin: Germany

Production
- Production company: UFA

Meine wunderbare Familie is a German television series.

== See also ==
- List of German television series
