= Die Wölfe =

2009 German miniseries

- Also known as: The Wolves of Berlin
- Genre: Docudrama
- Written by: Friedemann Fromm
- Directed by: Andreas Kleinert
- Country of origin: Germany
- Original language: German

Production
- Producer: Regina Ziegler

Original release
- Network: ZDF
- Release: 29 January – 30 January 2009

Die Wölfe (English: The Wolves of Berlin) is a 3-part German miniseries directed by Friedemann Fromm. The three episodes were broadcast for the first time on 29 January and 2–3 February 2009 on ZDF.

== Background ==
The series deals with the story of a Berlin youth gang. The first episode (Nothing Can Separate Us) is set in 1989 then flashes back to 1948 with the Berlin blockade. The next (Broken City) is set in 1961 when the Berlin Wall is erected. The final (Hope for Luck) returns to 1989 and reunification.

== Cast ==
- Axel Prahl ... Bernd Lehmann
- Barbara Auer ... Lotte
- Matthias Brandt ... Jakob Lehn
- Johanna Gastdorf ... Silke
- Felix Vörtler ... Kurt Ripanski
- Ulrike Krumbiegel ... Mutter Lehmann
- Sven Lehmann ... Vater Lehmann
- Alma Leiberg ... Miriam Lehmann
- Florian David Fitz ... Thomas Feiner
- Mike Maas ... Herr Meinrath

== Awards ==
Year	Award	Category	Nominated	Result
2009	37th International Emmy Awards	Best TV Movies/Miniseries	Die Wölfe	Won
