= Salto Kommunale =

- Starring: Wolfgang Stumph
- Country of origin: Germany

Salto Kommunale is a German television series.

== See also ==
- List of German television series
