= Schwarz greift ein =

- Starring: Klaus Wennemann
- Country of origin: Germany

Schwarz greift ein is a German television series.

== See also ==
- List of German television series
