= Alisa – Folge deinem Herzen =

- Country of origin: Germany

Alisa – Folge deinem Herzen ("Alisa - Follow Your Heart") is a German telenovela. It was filmed in the Potsdam Studio Babelsberg for ZDF in co-production with ORF and SF. 370 episodes were produced in two series between 2009 and 2010.

== See also ==
- List of German television series
