= Hallo, Onkel Doc! =

- Country of origin: Germany

Original release
- Release: 1994 – 2000

Hallo, Onkel Doc! is a German television series. It was produced by Sat.1 from 1994 to 2000 and broadcast for the first time.

== See also ==
- List of German television series
