= Alphateam – Die Lebensretter im OP =

German hospital drama television series

- Also known as: Alpha Team - The Lifesaver in the OR
- Country of origin: Germany

Original release
- Release: 1996 – 2005

Alphateam – Die Lebensretter im OP (German: Alpha Team - The Lifesaver in the OR) was a German hospital drama television series that aired on Sat.1 between 1996 and 2005. The series covered the work of a team of doctors, nurses and caregivers in the fictional Hamburg Hansa Clinic, located in the Altona district.

== See also ==
- List of German television series
