= Doppelter Einsatz =

German television series

- Starring: Despina Pajanou
- Country of origin: Germany

Original release
- Network: RTL Television
- Release: September 20, 1994 – July 31, 2007

Doppelter Einsatz is a German television series. This classic series starred Despina Pajanou as one of the two titular female, Hamburg police officers. Her partner changed over the seasons.

== See also ==
- List of German television series
