= Mensch, Pia! =

- Starring: Alexandra Maria Lara
- Country of origin: Germany

Mensch, Pia! is a German television series.

== Cast ==
=== Main ===
- Alexandra Maria Lara as Pia Mangold
- Henry Hübchen as Frederic Mangold
- Brigitte Karner as Charlotte Mangold

== See also ==
- List of German television series
