= Medical drama =

Television program or film presented around medical environments

A medical drama is a television movie or film in which events center upon a hospital, clinic, doctor's office, a paramedic, or any other medical topic or environment. Most recent medical dramatic programming goes beyond the events pertaining to the characters' jobs and portray some aspects of their personal lives. The longest running prime-time medical drama in the world is the British series Casualty, airing since 1986, and the longest running medical soap opera is General Hospital, running since 1963.

== History ==
City Hospital, which first aired in 1951, is usually considered to be the first televised medical drama. (The first serialized medical drama was probably the Dr. Kildare film series (1937–1947), starring a number of actors in the eponymous role, and Lionel Barrymore throughout the series.) Medic, which featured Richard Boone, ran two seasons, from 1954 to 1956. The genre became a staple of prime time television with the enormous popularity of Dr. Kildare and Ben Casey, both debuting in 1961. The BBC series Dr. Finlay's Casebook (1962–1971) is an early example of another common variant of the genre in which a medical practice is used as a focus for stories detailing the life of a (usually small) community. The long running Australian series A Country Practice (1981–1993) is a later example of this subgenre. From 1969 to 1976, the series Marcus Welby, M.D. and Medical Center were extremely popular for their both orthodox and unorthodox way of presenting medical cases. In 1972, the series Emergency!, starring Robert Fuller and Julie London, was the first medical drama ever to combine both, a fire department paramedic rescue program with an emergency room in a general hospital, which also focused on real-life rescues. Also in 1972, the first episode of M*A*S*H aired; the show's tone was generally comedic, but dark—poignant moments emanating from the death caused by war were not uncommon. This trend of comedy with undercurrents of darkness in medical TV shows can also be seen in St. Elsewhere, Doogie Howser, M.D., House M.D., Grey's Anatomy, Scrubs, ER, Code Black, Nip/Tuck, and Chicago Med. In 1986, Casualty started airing on BBC One in the United Kingdom. Casualty continues to be aired, making it the longest running TV medical drama. Its sister show Holby City aired from 1999 to 2022. In 2000, the BBC commissioned Doctors, a medical drama soap that continued to air and became the BBC's flagship daytime series. In 2023, Doctors was axed by the BBC after 23 years on air, with the final episode airing in November 2024.

Communications theorist Marshall McLuhan, in his 1964 work on the nature of media, predicted success for this particular genre on TV.

One of the most vivid examples of the tactile quality of the TV image occurs in medical experience. In closed-circuit instruction in surgery, medical students from the first reported a strange effect-that they seemed not to be watching an operation, but performing it. They felt that they were holding the scalpel. Thus the TV image, in fostering a passion for depth involvement in every aspect of experience, creates an obsession with bodily welfare. The sudden emergence of the TV medico and the hospital ward as a program to rival the western is perfectly natural. It would be possible to list a dozen untried kinds of programs that would prove immediately popular for the same reasons. Tom Dooley and his epic of Medicare for the backward society was a natural outgrowth of the first TV decade.

According to Professor George Ikkos, the president of the psychiatry sector of the Royal Society of Medicine, medical dramas have accumulated large audiences because the characters in the shows are often depicted as everyday citizens who have extraordinary careers, which promotes a sense of relatability among viewers. Medical drama is sometimes used in medical education; a systematic review of such uses indicated that it is a "feasible and acceptable" complement to medical education.

== See also ==
- List of medical drama television programs
- Medical fiction
