= Für alle Fälle Stefanie =

German medical drama television series

- Genre: Medical drama
- Created by: Werner Krämer
- Starring: Kathrin Waligura; Claudia Schmutzler; Julia Hentschel
- Country of origin: Germany
- No. of seasons: 11
- No. of episodes: 328

Original release
- Network: Sat.1
- Release: 15 May 1995 – 4 March 2004

Für alle Fälle Stefanie is a German medical drama television series created by Werner Krämer that aired on Sat.1 from 15 May 1995 to 29 August 2005. It was produced by Novafilm Fernsehproduktion. Für alle Fälle Stefanie follows the professional and personal life of nurse Stefanie Engel, then Stephanie Wilde and for a short time Fanny 'Stephanie' Stephan. The show was a giant success for the network and had around seven, in later years, five million viewers on a weekly basis. It won the Goldene Kamera award in 1997 and the Bavarian TV Award in 1996.

== Production ==
=== Development ===
The show premiered in 1995 and soon became a hit for the network. In the beginning, the show's working title was Stefanie - Schwester mit Herz, which was later used for a rerun of the early seasons. Kathrin Waligura leaves the show after the first two seasons as the show's title role Stefanie Engel. Her successor, Stephanie Wilde played by Claudia Schmutzler, was introduced in the last episodes of the second season and took over as the show's lead in season three. Schmutzler became the identification of the show and was wildly popular. She carried Für alle Fälle Stefanie through its best years and decided to leave in early 1999. Julia Hentschel took over as Fanny Stephan who was soon nicknamed Stephanie. However, under Hentschel the show started to do poorly in ratings. The network offered Schmutzler a new contract, which allowed her many amenities. The show was brought back to new success and stayed a strong performer through the end of season ten. The season finale featured Stephanie Wilde's death and resulted in Schmutzler leaving the show for a second time. It followed a reboot attempt with the start of the 11th season, which saw the return of Kathrin Waligura as the original Stefanie. She was now a doctor and changed the tone of the show. Much of the show's cast was changed with the focus on the doctors rather than the nurses as it has been in the previous years. The production changed the show's title into Stefanie - Eine Frau startet durch. The show couldn't reach to former success, only having three million viewers left at the peak. Sat.1 decided to cancel the show. The series finale, intended to be a season finale, aired in March 2004 as the last season ended its rerun with a few new episodes in the morning hours.

=== Broadcasting ===
It premiered on Monday nights at 8:00 pm at a time when Sat.1 tried to challenge Das Erste's Tagesschau. The attempt failed and Sat.1 later returned to start their primetime at 8:15 pm after the Tagesschau was over. The third season premiered on a new night, Thursdays at 9:15 pm. The show regularly won its time slot. In April 1999, the show started suffering in ratings after Schmutzler left the show. As ratings fell under five million viewers, Schmutzler was brought back. The show recovered and was back to its former success in the end of 2000. The 10th season premiered on 8 July 2004 as a spinoff in its new time slot at 8:15 pm on Thursday nights. The ratings dropped to a new low and Sat.1 put the season on a break in September 2004, then returning in its old time slot in December. However, as ratings didn't recover the network put the show on another hiatus while announcing that the 11th season is the series finale. The last episodes of the final season were then part of a rerun with the series finale airing on 10 March 2005 at 11:00 am.
