= Dr. Sommerfeld – Neues vom Bülowbogen =

- Starring: Rainer Hunold
- Country of origin: Germany

Dr. Sommerfeld – Neues vom Bülowbogen is a German television series.

== See also ==
- List of German television series
