= Bettys Diagnose =

German television series

- Starring: Florian Fitz; Sybille Jacqueline Schedwill; Niklas Löffler; Henrike Hahn; Ercan Durmaz; Claudia Hiersche; Yasmina Djaballah; Rona Özcan; Florian Frowein; Constantin Lücke; Antonia Döring
- Country of origin: Germany
- Original language: German
- No. of seasons: 10
- No. of episodes: 217

Production
- Producers: Network Movie Film-und Fernsehproduktion; ZDF Studios
- Running time: 45 min

Original release
- Network: ZDF
- Release: 9 January 2015

Bettys Diagnose (Betty's Diagnosis) is a German television series on ZDF about a nurse and her colleagues who confront medical emergencies with empathy and humor.

== Cast ==
The main character Betty Dewalt was played by Bettina Lamprecht for the first three seasons. A new main character played by Annina Hellenthal, nurse Betty Weiss, was introduced in Season 4.

Third in the title role is Henrike Hahn, who plays Betty Hertz.

== See also ==
- List of German television series
