= Altaras =

Altaras is a Sephardic Jewish surname. It means 'embroiderer' in Arabic. Notable people with the surname include:

- David ben Solomon Altaras, eighteenth-century Italian rabbi
- Aaron Altaras (born 1995), German actor
- Adriana Altaras (born 1960), Croatian born German actress, theater director and writer
- Jakob Altaras (1918–2001), Croatian-German physician and president of the Jewish community Giessen
- Thea Altaras (1924–2004), Croatian-German architect

== See also ==
- al-Tarās family
