= MI8 (disambiguation) =

MI8, MI-8, or another variant may refer to:

- AMD's MI8, a brand of deep learning oriented Graphics Processing Units, see Radeon Instinct
- MI8, the World War II British signals intelligence agency
- Mil Mi-8, the Soviet-designed helicopter
- Mitten im 8en, an Austrian TV soap/comedy series
- Black Chamber, the United States' first peacetime cryptanalytic organization
- Michigan's 8th congressional district
- M-8 (Michigan highway)
- Xiaomi Mi 8, smartphone developed by Xiaomi
- Mission: Impossible – The Final Reckoning, a spy-thriller film directed by Christopher McQuarrie and starring Tom Cruise
