= Andrea Sawatzki =

German actress (born 1963)

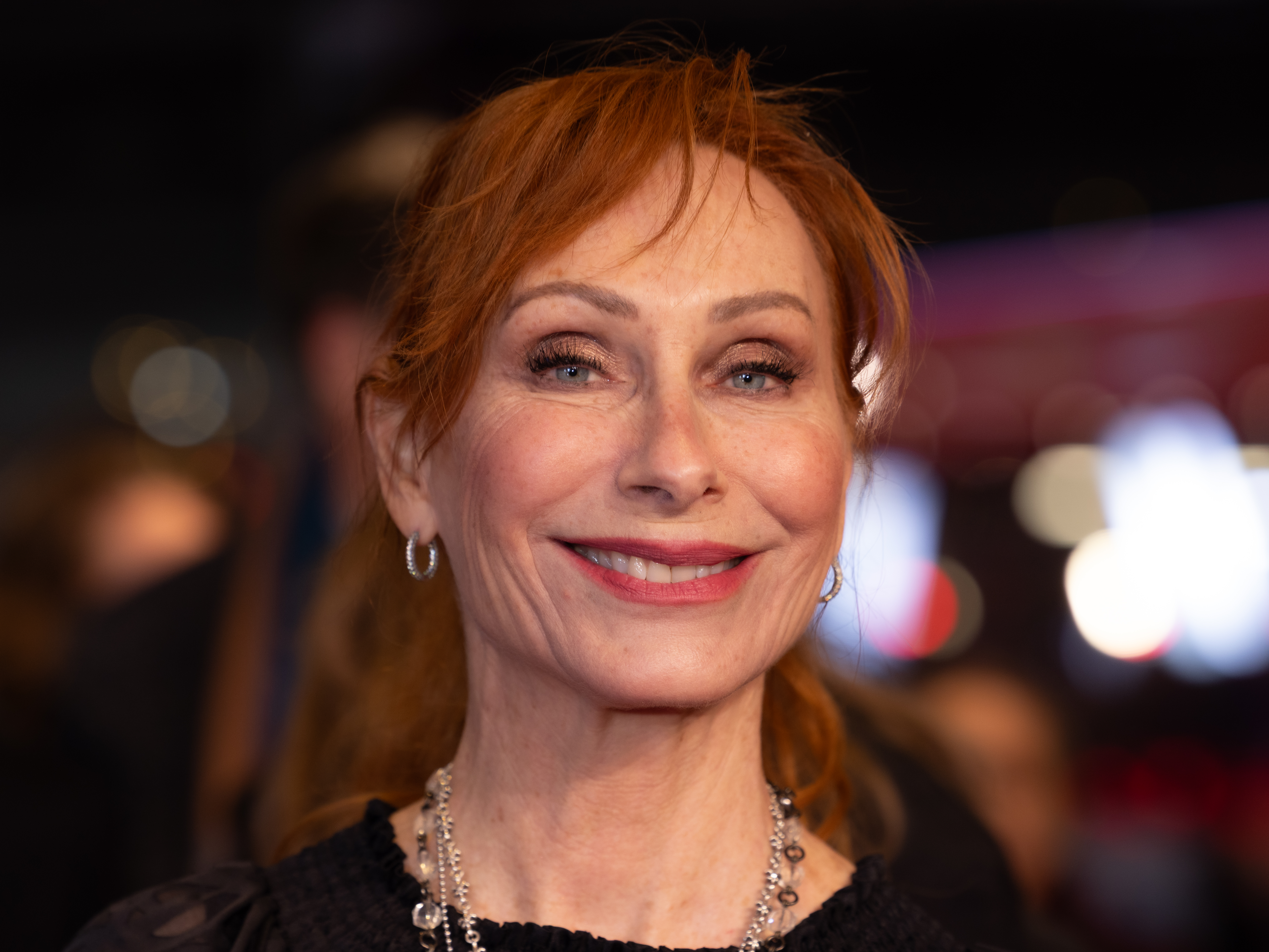
- Sawatzki in 2025
- Born: 23 February 1963 (age 63); Schlehdorf, Bavaria, West Germany
- Occupations: Actress, voice actress
- Years active: 1988–present
- Spouse: Christian Berkel (m. 2011)
- Children: 2

Andrea Sawatzki (German: [anˈdʁeːa zaˈvatskiː]; born 23 February 1963) is a German actress. From 2002 to 2010 she starred in the Hessischer Rundfunk version of the popular television crime series Tatort as police inspector Charlotte Sänger.

She also gained international prominence as an actress in the German films Bandits (1997) and Das Experiment (2001).

== Life and work ==
Sawatzki is the daughter of a nurse and a journalist. After studying at the Neue Münchner Schauspielschule (Munich acting school) and doing an internship at the Munich Kammerspiele, Sawatzky played in theaters in Stuttgart, Wilhelmshaven and Munich from 1988 to 1992. Her first movie role was in Faust in 1988, directed by Dieter Dorn. In 1997, she became known to a broader audience through the movie The Pharmacist in which she played Alma Siebert. She made her breakthrough as one of the best-known German actresses with her role as Chief Inspector Charlotte Sänger on the Tatort series from 2002 to 2010.

Moreover, she acted in successful movies such as Bandits, Late Show, Leo & Claire and Das Experiment. She appeared in several TV series and TV movies such as The King of St. Pauli and Die Manns, both praised by critics. She posed for a spread in Playboy magazine in 2003.

Sawatzki read for audio books, such as for the series TV-Kommissare lesen Krimis the story Die Maus in der Ecke and the novel Glennkill. In 2007, Sawatzki was godmother of the Deutscher Kinderpreis (German Children's Award).

=== Personal life ===
In 2011, Sawatzki married her long-term partner and fellow actor Christian Berkel. They have two sons together and live in Berlin.

== Filmography ==
- 1991: Tatort – Der Fall Schimanski
- 1992: Auf Achse (TV)
- 1992: Tatort – Unversöhnlich
- 1994: Das Schwein – Eine deutsche Karriere
- 1995–1998: A.S. (TV series)
- 1995: Polizeiruf 110 (TV) – 1A Landeier
- 1997: Bandits
- 1997: Bella Block (TV) – Geldgier
- 1997: Life is All You Get
- 1997: The Pharmacist
- 1998: The King of St. Pauli (TV miniseries)
- 1998: The Polar Bear
- 1999: Late Show
- 1999: Our Island in the South Pacific
- 1999: Apokalypso (TV film)
- 1999: Klemperer – Ein Leben in Deutschland
- 2000: Ants in the Pants
- 2001: Das Experiment
- 2001: Leo & Claire
- 2001: The Man Next Door
- 2001: Die Manns – Ein Jahrhundertroman (TV miniseries)
- 2002–2010: Tatort
- 2002: Die Affäre Semmeling (TV miniseries)
- 2002: Sinan Toprak ist der Unbestechliche (TV)
- 2002: Rosa Roth (TV series) – Geschlossene Gesellschaft
- 2003: Prince Charming (TV film)
- 2005–2006: Arme Millionäre (TV series)
- 2005: The Next-Door Neighbour Is Alive
- 2005: Erkan & Stefan in Der Tod kommt krass
- 2006: Helen, Fred und Ted
- 2006: Das Schneckenhaus
- 2007: Suddenly Gina
- 2007: The Other Boy
- 2007: Vom Atmen unter Wasser
- 2008: Sechs auf einen Streich – Brüderchen und Schwesterchen (TV miniseries)
- 2009: Abducted
- 2010: Bella Vita (TV)
- 2011: Mein Bruder, sein Erbe und ich
- 2011: The Great Comeback
- 2011: Borgia (TV series)
- 2018: Subs
- 2019: Es bleibt in der Familie (a.k.a. Todo queda en familia)
- 2019: Bella Germania
- 2021: The Masked Singer (German season 5) as Axolotl
- 2022: Freibad
- 2024: Der Upir (TV series)
