= Vanessa Krüger =

German actress

- Born: 17 March 1991 (age 34); Berlin, Germany
- Occupation: Actress
- Years active: 2005–present
- Relatives: Vincent Krüger (brother); Charlotte Krüger (sister)

Vanessa Krüger (born 17 March 1991) is a German actress, known for her roles in films such as French for Beginners, 42plus, and The Prize.

== Early life and career ==
Krüger was born and grew up in Berlin. At the age of 13, she pursued her career by attending drama school. She also attended the Deutsche Film- und Fernsehakademie Berlin (DFFB), an acting agency in Berlin. After this, she played as Lena in Christian Ditter's French for Beginners. The film which she was involved was ranked number four of the German cinema charts.

== Filmography ==
=== Film ===
Year	Title	Role	Director	Notes
2006	French for Beginners	Lena	Christian Ditter	
2007	42plus	Sonja	Sabine Derflinger	
2009	Invulnerable	Nadine	Felice Götze	Short film
2009	Gemeinsam einsam	Lara	Lars Kornhoff	Short film
2010	Philipp	Caro	Fabian Möhrke	Short film
2011	Von Mäusen und Lügen	Pia Fischer	Sibylle Tafel	
2011	The Prize	Nicole (young)	Elke Hauck	

=== Television ===
Year	Title	Role	Director	Notes
2007	Alles Lüge – Auf der Suche nach Rio Reiser	Kim	Barbara Teufel	Television film
2009	Rosa Roth: Das Mädchen aus Sumy	Nathalie Krüger	Carlo Rola	
2009	Sterne über dem Eis	Julia Hofmann	Sigi Rothemund	Television film
2010	Tatort: Hilfos	Anna Lena	Hannu Salonen	
2010	She Deserved It	friend	Thomas Stiller	Television film
