= French for Beginners =

- Theatrical release poster
- Französisch für Anfänger
- Directed by: Christian Ditter
- Screenplay by: Christian Ditter
- Produced by: Christian Becker; Christoph Menardi; Anita Schneider
- Starring: François Goeske; Paula Schramm
- Cinematography: Christian Rein
- Edited by: Patricia Rommel
- Music by: Philipp F. Kölmel
- Release date: 3 June 2006 (Germany)
- Running time: 98 minutes
- Countries: Germany; France
- Languages: German; French; English

French for Beginners (German: Französisch für Anfänger) is a German-French romantic comedy film made in 2006 and directed by Christian Ditter. The theme of the film is young love during a school exchange in France, complicated by language barriers and cultural differences.

== Synopsis ==
Henrik hates French lessons with Monsieur Nouvelleville and grows to dislike all things French. But then he falls in love with Valerie of all people, who because of her French Mother is close to the language and culture and therefore takes part in the exchange programme. In order to prove his love to her, Henrik takes part in the exchange together with his friend Johannes.

Since unfortunately Henrik hardly speaks any French, communication turns out to be exceedingly difficult. After he misses the opportunity to get close to her on a stopover in Paris, he is shocked to learn at the first meeting with the local students that Valerie already has a French boyfriend. Not only is Henrik now jealous of Mathieu, but also frustrated because of the strange French customs he learns about in the company of his exchange partner Cyril, who lives on a farm.

Initially Henrik annoys Valerie with his attacks on Mathieu, but a short time later he learns that they've split up because Mathieu was being unfaithful with French girl Charlotte. Valerie is now ready for a date with the timid but genuine boy. The pair arranges to meet at a party and there seems to be nothing else in the way of love.

However Henry has not considered that it is customary for the French to eat a long evening meal. As he arrives very late to the party, Charlotte gets in his way. She talks to him in English and tries to seduce him. After Valerie has consumed an excessive amount of alcohol, Henrik takes her home and resists the temptation to take advantage of her intoxicated state.

At the farewell party with all the participants, he impresses his beloved by starting to sing "Bonsoir mes amis" instead of stammering a thank you speech. But Charlotte doesn't give up and visits Henrik at his guest family's house. After Valerie sees the two in bed, she plans to travel to Brittany to spend time with her uncle. Henry finds out at the last moment about this plan and steals the group's coach to intercept her at the train station. There, he can convince her of his true love, whereupon Valerie forgives him and they kiss.

== Cast ==
- François Goeske - Henrik
- Paula Schramm - Valerie
- Lennard Bertzbach - Johannes
- Christian Tramitz - Monsieur Nouvelleville
- Élodie Bollée - Charlotte
- Antoine Morin - Cyril
- Cyril Descours - Mathieu
- Thaddäus Meilinger - Niklas
- Vanessa Krüger - Lena

== Release ==
French for Beginners premiered on 3 June 2006 in Germany.
