= Seyneb Saleh =

German actress

- Born: Seyneb Saleh; Aalen, Baden-Württemberg, West Germany
- Education: Berlin University of the Arts
- Occupation: Actress
- Years active: 2010–present
- Height: 1.67 m (5 ft 5 1/2 in)

Seyneb Saleh is a German actress. She has many stage credits as well as numerous appearances in TV series and films. In 2026 she has a leading role as Julika Ritter in the Netflix / Gaumont spy thriller series Unfamiliar. As of 2026 she has won two German Acting Awards (Deutscher Schauspielpreis).

== Early life and education ==
Seyneb Saleh was born in Aalen, Baden-Württemberg. Her mother is a German pharmacist, and her father is Iraqi. She was mainly raised in Solingen, Germany, but also spent some time in Morocco.

She studied acting from 2008 to 2012 at the Berlin University of the Arts in Berlin and received a scholarship from the German Academic Scholarship Foundation Studienstiftung des deutschen Volkes in 2010.

== Career ==
After graduating Saleh performed in over 26 theater productions at the Maxim Gorki Theater, the Schauspielhaus Graz, the Volkstheater Wien, the Schauspiel Hannover, and the Deutsches Theater Berlin. She was engaged at the Schauspielhaus Graz until 2015, moving with theatre director Anna Badora to the Vienna Volkstheater. Among her performances there were roles in Yael Ronen's Niemandsland; Narrenschiff; and, in 2018, Die zehn Gebote.

In addition to her theater engagements, she has regularly worked for film, TV and streaming platforms. Saleh was introduced to a wider international audience in 2018 in Duncan Jones' neo-noir science fiction film Mute, in which she played the female lead character Naadirah alongside Alexander Skarsgård, Paul Rudd & Justin Theroux. She also had roles in the TV series Dogs of Berlin (2018); Deutschland 86 (as an Arabic speaker); the ZDF series Jenseits der Spree (2021); the award-winning German anthology series Uncivilized (2024); the German adaptation of the French cult series Call my Agent - Berlin (2025) as well as in feature films such as Toubab (2021); Was von der Liebe bleibt (2022); and Sabbatical (2023).

In 2022 her leading role in the multilingual German-Israeli Sky spy thriller series Munich Games further gained her much praise from international critics.

She plays a prominent character, BND intelligence analyst Julika Ritter, in the Netflix / Gaumont spy thriller series Unfamiliar, which is set in Berlin.

== Recognition and awards ==
In 2022 Saleh won her first German Acting Award (Deutscher Schauspielpreis) as Best Supporting Role for her performance in Toubab and a second one followed for her performance in the episode 9/11 of the German anthology series Uncivilized as Best Episodic Role in 2025.

At the 2024 Filmfestival Türkei/Deutschland, she was nominated for Best Actress, for her performance in Was von der Liebe bleibt.

=== Deutscher Schauspielpreis ===
Year	Nominated work	Category	Result	Ref.
2022	Toubab	Best Supporting Actress	Won	
2023	Munich Games	Best Duo	Nominated	
2025	Uncivilized	Best Episodic Role	Won	

== Filmography ==
Year	Title	Role	Director	Network	Notes
2010	The Red Room	Sibil	Rudolf Thome		cinematic release
2012	Offroad	Özlem	Elmar Fischer		cinematic release
2014	For Nothing	Blanche	Stephan Geene		cinematic release
2014	The Lies of the Victors	Mira	Christoph Hochhäusler		cinematic release
2017	Neda	Neda	Afagh Irandoost		short film
2018	Deutschland 86	Aya	Florian Cossen, Arne Feldhusen	Amazon Prime / Sundance TV	2 episodes
2018	Dogs of Berlin	Rafika Masaad	Christian Alvart	Netflix	6/10 episodes
2018	Mute	Naadirah	Duncan Jones	Netflix	
2019	Golden Twenties	Tamara	Sofie Kluge		cinematic release
2019	Herzjagen	Anika	Elisabeth Scharang	ORF	TV movie
2020	Over Christmas	Karina	Tobi Baumann	Netflix	3/3 episodes
2021	Jenseits der Spree	Kay Freund	Marcus Ulbricht, Neelesha Barthel	ZDF	4 episodes
2021	Dengler - Kreuzberg Blues	Ezra Malik	Daniel Rübesam	ZDF	TV movie
2021	Toubab	Yara	Florian Dietrich		cinematic release
2022	Munich Games	Maria Köhler	Philipp Kadelbach	Sky	6/6 episodes
2023	Between Us	Yasemine	Kanwal Sethi		cinematic release
2024	30 Tage Lust	Marie	Pia Hellenthal, Bartosz Grudziecki	SWR	1/6 episode
2024	Uncivilized	Sahra Alwani	Bilal Bahadır	ZDF	1/1 episode
2024	Sabbatical	Tara	Judith Angerbauer		cinematic release
2025	Call my Agent - Berlin	Nicole Meister	Johann Buchholz, Boris Kunz, Laura Lackmann	Disney+ / Hulu	8/10 episodes
2026	Unfamiliar	Julika Ritter	Lennart Ruff, Philipp Leinemann	Netflix	6/6 episodes

== Theater (selected) ==
=== Theater productions ===
Year	Title	Author	Role	Director
2012	Clavigo	Goethe	Marie	Alexandra Liedtke
2012	FaustIn and Out	Elfriede Jellinek	Faustin	Philip Jenkins
2013	Orphans	Dennis Kelly	Helen	Lina Hölscher
2013	No Man's Land	Yael Ronen & the ensemble	Leyla	Yael Ronen
2014 - 2018	The Misunderstanding	Albert Camus	Maria, the Mother	Nikolaus Habjan
2015	Vieux Carré	Tennessee Williams	Jane Sparks	Sebastian Schug
2015	The Changeling	Christine Lavant	Wrga, Zitha	Nikolaus Habjan
2016	Brighton Beach Memoirs	Neil Simon	Nora	Sarantos Zervoulakos
2016	Ship of Fools	Katherine Anne Porter	Lizzi Spöckenkieker	Dušan David Pařízek
2017	Romeo and Juliet	Shakespeare	Juliet	Sebastian Schug
2017 - 2018	Dekalog: The Ten Commandments	Krzysztof Kieślowski	Anka / Majka / Ola / Zofia	Stephan Kimmig
2019	Platonowa	Anton Tschechow	Sofia	Stephan Kimmig
2019	Iphigenia	Euripides	Iphigenia	Anne Lenk
2020	The Marriage of Figaro	Beaumarchais	Suzanne	András Dömötör
2021 - 2023	Pictures of Your True Love	Wolfgang Herrndorf	Isa	Markus Bothe
2022 - 2025	Minna von Barnhelm	Lessing	Franziska	Anne Lenk
