= Laurence Rupp =

Austrian actor

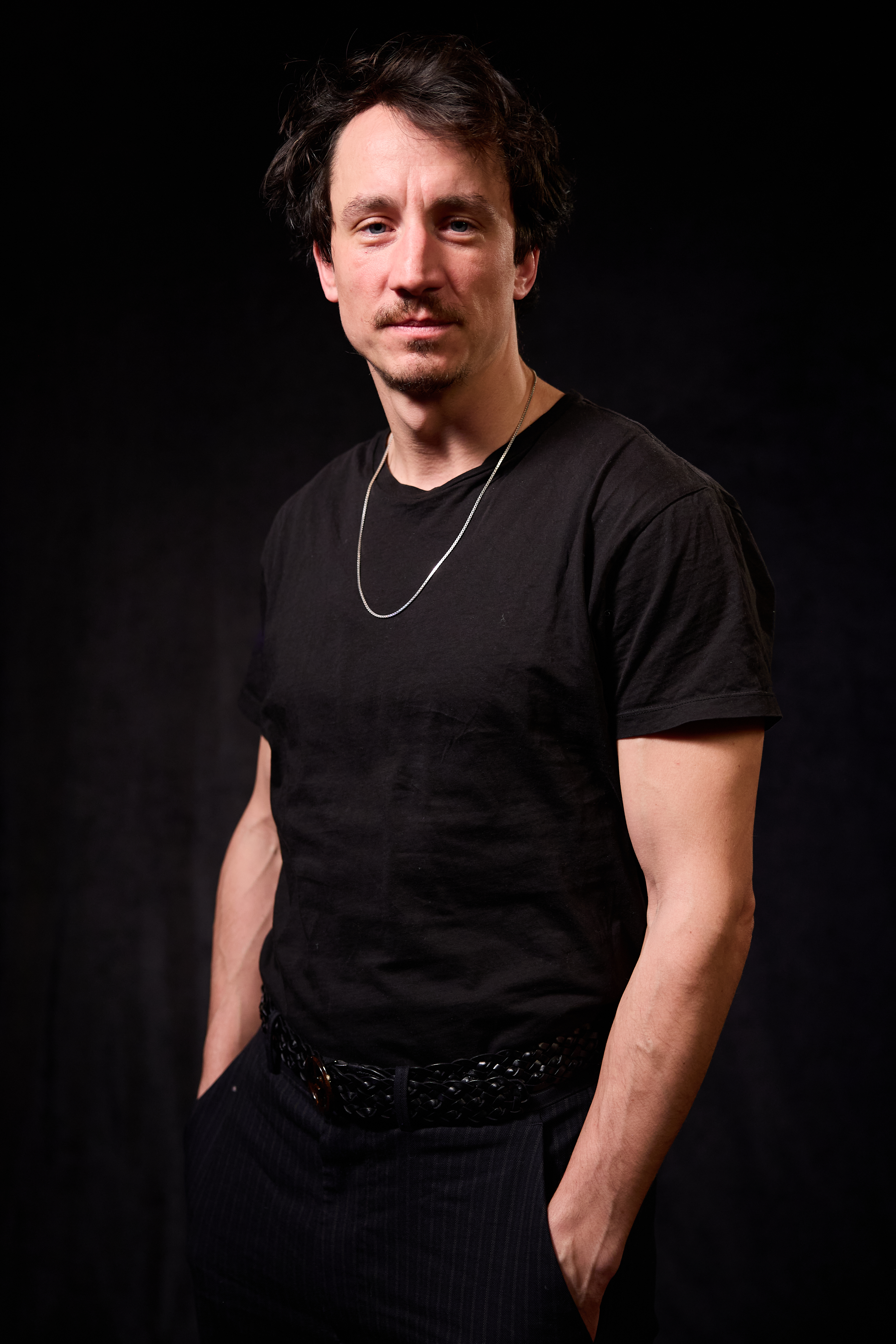
- Born: Vienna, Austria
- Occupation: Actor
- Years active: 1999-present
- Spouse: Paula Schramm

Laurence Rupp is an Austrian theatre and film actor. He was part of the ensemble of the Vienna Burgtheater and then moveed to the Berliner Ensemble. He has had roles in the series Barbarians (2020) and Unfamiliar (2026).

== Early life and education ==
Laurence Rupp was born in Vienna, Austria.

At a casting for Commissioner Rex in 1999, Rupp, who was age 11 at the time, was hired for the episode Terrible Truth. After this role, Rupp occasionally appeared in small roles, including Tom und die Biberbande in 2001.

He graduated high school in 2006.

== Career ==
Shortly after leaving school in 2006, the director Andreas Prochaska hired him for the horror film You'll Be Dead in 3 Days. The Austrian soap opera Mitten im 8en, in which Rupp appeared in 2007, was cancelled after 56 episodes due to falling ratings. In the same year, he starred in the Swiss film comedy Tell by Mike Eschmann.

Rupp co-directed the two-part thriller The Last Judgment in 2008 together with Tobias Moretti, whose son he played, directed by Urs Egger.

From 2010 to 2014, Rupp studied acting at the Vienna Max Reinhardt Seminar.

In September 2013, he became an ensemble member of the Vienna Burgtheater. For the 2017-2018 season, he moved to the Berliner Ensemble under the direction of Oliver Reese.

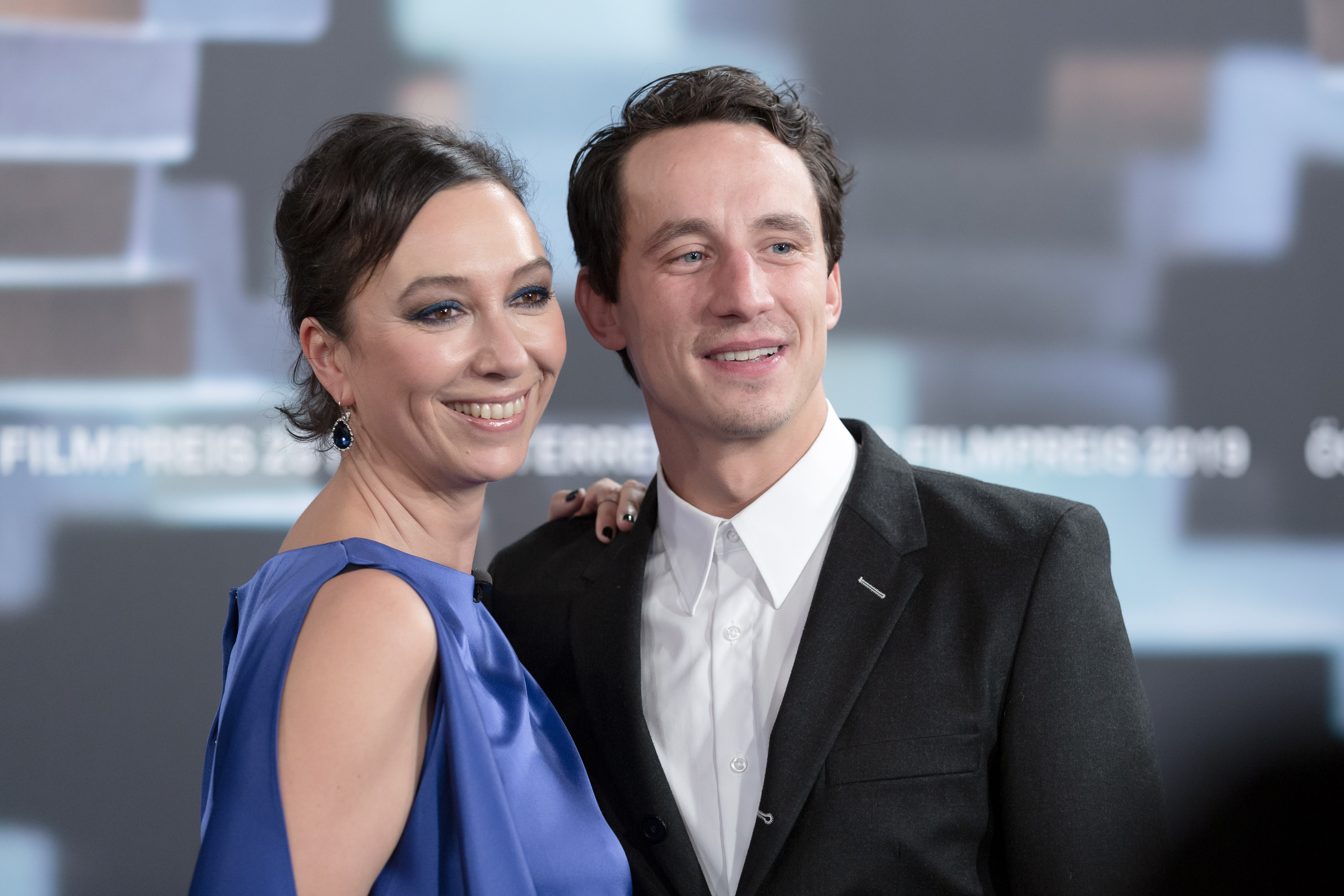
Rupp with Ursula Strauss in 2019

In the series Barbarians, released in 2020, he portrayed Arminius in the events surrounding the Battle of the Teutoburg Forest and its consequences.

Rupp then starred in the 2024 romantic comedy The Heartbreak Agency on Netflix.

In 2026, he played Ben Krüger in the series Unfamiliar, which is set in Berlin.

== Awards and nominations ==
For Cops, Rupp received the 2019 Austrian Film Award for the category Best Male Lead Actor.

For his role in the ORF-Landkrimi Vier, he was nominated at the TV Film Festival Baden-Baden 2022 with Manuel Rubey awarded the special prize for outstanding acting performance.

== Personal life ==
Rupp has a son with Austrian actress Sabrina Reiter, but the couple separated shortly after his birth in November 2007. He began a relationship with actress Paula Schramm, whom he met while filming Der Eisenhans, and their son was born in March 2015.

== Filmography ==
- 1999: Commissioner Rex – Terrible Truth
- 1999: Love Moves Mountains
- 1999: Medicopter 117 – The Death Trap
- 2001: Tom and the Beaver Gang
- 2004: Commissioner Rex – snapshot
- 2006: Dead in 3 Days
- 2006: Dad's Dead
- 2007: Middle of the 8th
- 2007: Tell
- 2008: The Last Judgment
- 2008: SOKO Kitzbühel
- 2009: Commissioner Rex – A Deadly Match
- 2009: Lilly Schönauer – Paula's Dream
- 2010: FC Back Pass
- 2010: Molly & Pug – A Pug Rarely Comes alone
- 2011: The Winemaker War
- 2011: The Iron Hans (fairy tale film)
- 2012: Void (short film)
- 2014: Crime Scene: Paradise (TV series)
- 2015: Mission: Impossible – Rogue Nation
- 2016: The Dreamed Ones
- 2016: The Night of 1000 Hours
- 2016: The Sacher
- 2016: The Children of Villa Emma (TV film)
- 2017: Trakehner Blood (TV series)
- 2018: Cops
- 2018: The Professor – Crime Scene Oil Field (TV film)
- 2019: Suburban Women (TV series)
- 2019: Vienna Blood – "Queen of the Night" (TV series)
- 2019: South Pole (TV film)
- 2020: The Dead from Lake Constance – "Curse from the Deep" (TV series)
- 2020: Crime Scene: Pumps (TV series)
- 2020: Barbarians (TV series; Netflix)
- 2021: Country Crime Thriller – 'Four' (TV series)
- 2022: Souls (TV series)
- 2022: Broll + Baroni – Dead Forever (TV film)
- 2024: Veni Vidi Vici
- 2024: The Heartbreak Agency
- 2024: Kafka (TV series)
- 2024: Rise of the Raven (TV series)
- 2026: Unfamiliar (TV series)
- 2026: Gentle Monster

== Theatre ==
- 2013: The Alpine King and the Misanthrope by Ferdinand Raimund, director: Michael Schachermaier, role: August Dorn – Burgtheater
- 2014: Wishless Misfortune by Peter Handke, director: Katie Mitchell, role: the son-in-law - casino
- 2014: The Last Days of Humanity by Karl Kraus, director: Georg Schmiedleitner – Burgtheater
- 2014: The Evil Spirit Lumpacivagabundus by Johann Nestroy, director: Matthias Hartmann, role: Lumpazivagabundus - Burgtheater
- 2014: At Nightfall by Peter Turrini, director: Christian Stückl, role: HC Artmann – Burgtheater
- 2015: The Imaginary Invalid, by Molière, director: Herbert Fritsch, role: Cleante – Burgtheater
- 2016: The Squatting by Miroslava Svolikova, director: Alia Luque – Burgtheater Vestibül
- 2017: The Abduction of Europe by Alexander Eisenach, director: Alexander Eisenach – Berliner Ensemble
- 2017: The Last Stop of Ersan Mondtag, director: Ersan Mondtag – Berliner Ensemble
- 2018: Panikherz by Benjamin von Stuckrad-Barre, director: Oliver Reese – Berliner Ensemble
