= Paula Schramm =

German actress (born 1989)

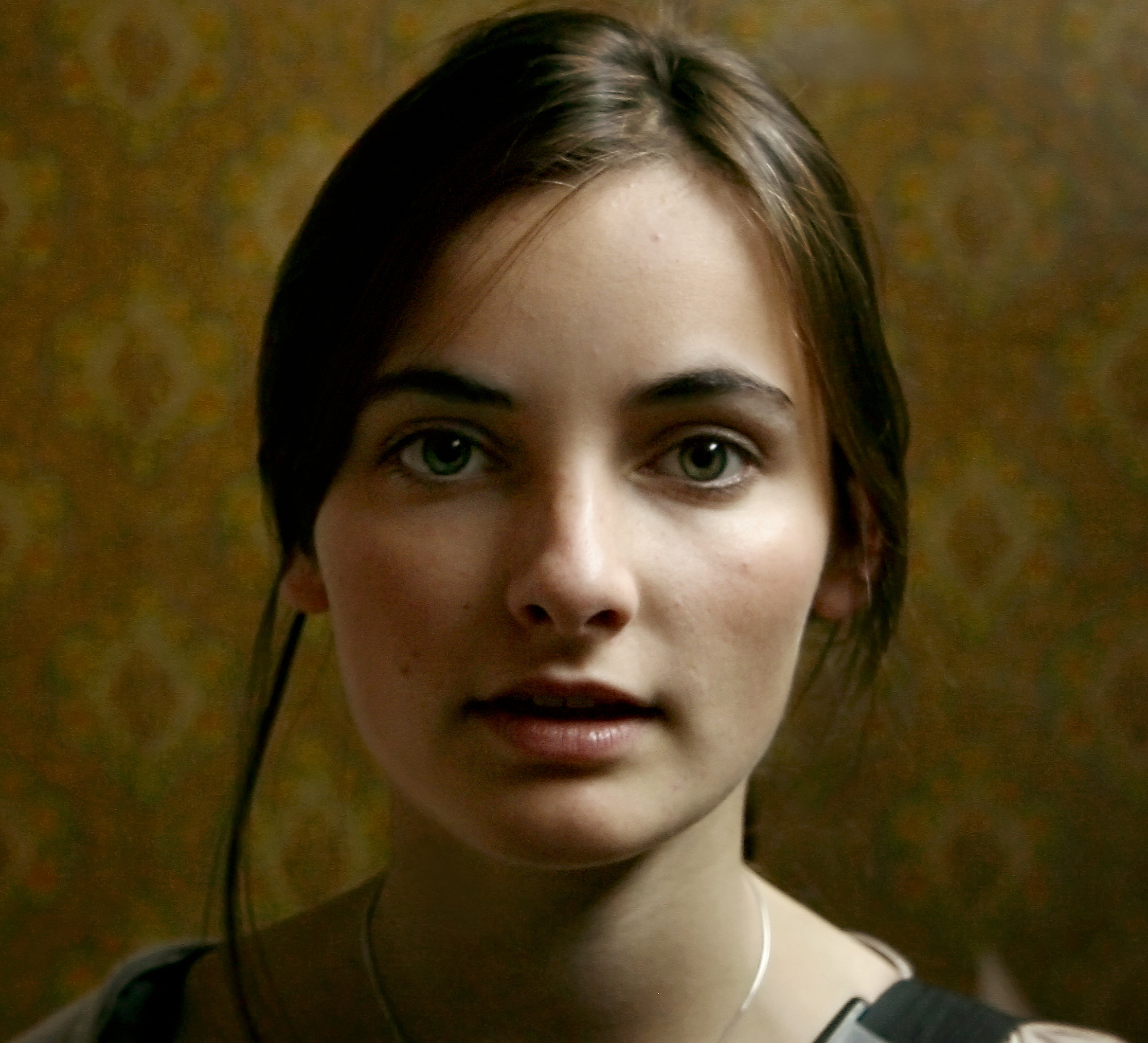
- Born: 11 October 1989 (age 36); Potsdam, East Germany
- Occupation: Actress
- Years active: 1997–present
- Spouse: Laurence Rupp

Paula Schramm (born 11 October 1989) is a German actress. She appeared in more than forty films since 1997.

== Selected filmography ==
Film
Year	Title	Role	Notes
2006	French for Beginners	Valerie	
2008	The Bridge	Paula Fink	TV film
2010	The Whistleblower	Luba	

TV Series
Year	Title	Role	Notes
2009–2011	Doctor's Diary	Lissi von Buren	
