= Apokalypso – Bombenstimmung in Berlin =

1999 film

- Written by: Jan Berger; Nicolai Karo; Günter Knarr; Martin Walz; Philipp Weinges
- Directed by: Martin Walz
- Starring: Armin Rohde; Andrea Sawatzki; Karl Kranzkowski; Adriana Altaras; Johannes Herrschmann
- Music by: Emil Viklický
- Country of origin: Germany
- Original language: German

Production
- Producers: Norbert Sauer; Tobias Stille
- Cinematography: Stephan Schuh
- Editor: Simone Klier
- Running time: 95 min.
- Production company: Pro 7

Original release
- Release: 1999

Apokalypso – Bombenstimmung in Berlin is a 1999 German thriller made-for-TV film, starring Armin Rohde and Andrea Sawatzki. It was directed by Martin Walz. The film was first shown at Oldenburg International Film Festival.

== Plot ==
A bomb specialist runs against time to save Berlin from an atomic catastrophe, planned by a fanatic sect.

== Cast ==
- Armin Rohde as Karl Mroszek
- Andrea Sawatzki as Helen
- Karl Kranzkowski as Paul Arndt
- Adriana Altaras as Mira Meissner
- Johannes Herrschmann as Peter
- Amalie Bizer as Eva Asimov
- Frank-Leo Schröder as Daniel Hertz

== Reception ==
Apokalypso was nominated for two Adolf Grimme Awards, one of the most prestigious awards for German television. The film was nominated for "Fiction/Entertainment" and "Outstanding Individual Achievement" (for Rohde and Sawatzki performances), but lost both.
