= Mute (2018 film) =

2018 film by Duncan Jones

- Release poster
- Directed by: Duncan Jones
- Screenplay by: Michael Robert Johnson; Duncan Jones
- Story by: Duncan Jones
- Produced by: Stuart Fenegan
- Starring: Alexander Skarsgård; Paul Rudd; Justin Theroux
- Cinematography: Gary Shaw
- Edited by: Laura Jennings; Barrett Heathcote
- Music by: Clint Mansell
- Production company: Liberty Films
- Distributed by: Netflix
- Release date: 23 February 2018
- Running time: 126 minutes
- Countries: United Kingdom; Germany
- Language: English

Mute is a 2018 tech-noir film directed by Duncan Jones, who co-wrote the script with Michael Robert Johnson. A follow-up to his 2009 film Moon, it stars Alexander Skarsgård, Paul Rudd, Justin Theroux, Robert Sheehan, Noel Clarke, Florence Kasumba, and Dominic Monaghan, revolving around a mute bartender (Skarsgård) searching for the love of his life (Seyneb Saleh) who has mysteriously disappeared. A third installment, a graphic novel called Madi: Once Upon a Time in the Future, was released in 2020.

The film was released on Netflix on 23 February 2018 and received negative reviews, with praise for the visuals but criticism for its pacing, plot, and mishandled subject material; it drew unfavorable comparisons to Blade Runner from many critics.

== Plot ==
In 2035, Leo, a bartender mute from a childhood accident, works at a Berlin strip club owned by Maksim. Leo dates waitress Naadirah, who is secretly in desperate need of money. After rowdy customer Stuart sexually harasses Naadirah, Leo assaults him.

At Leo's apartment, Naadirah attempts to tell him something important but is distracted when Leo shows her a bed he has been carving as a present for her. Moved, Naadirah has sex with him. Elsewhere, Maksim's mobsters meet American surgeons Cactus Bill and Duck, who run a black-market clinic. Bill pressed Maksim to provide forged documents to leave Berlin with his daughter Josie. Duck, however, enjoys Berlin and runs a cybernetic surgery side business.

Taunted by Stuart at the club, Leo fights him again and gets fired. Unable to contact Naadirah, Leo asks her roommate Luba for help, but she refuses. Following an address Naadirah wrote on his notepad, Leo finds Oswald. Oswald assumes Leo works for Nicky Simsek, Maksim's underling who is skimming money from Maksim's prostitutes. Leo meets with Simsek, who is babysitting Josie. Leo befriends Josie and leaves the money from Oswald and a note incriminating Simsek in front of Maksim's henchmen.

After tracking down Naadirah's address, Leo discovers Luba, who works as a prostitute under Naadirah's name. She is in love with Naadirah and jealous of Leo. Using Naadirah's contacts on the phone system on the fridge, Leo finds her mother. Leo learns Naadirah is Josie's mother; Cactus Bill, her ex-husband, is responsible for her disappearance.

After Bill and Duck torture Simsek on Maksim's orders, Bill discovers Duck is a pedophile. Bill threatens to break Duck's arms if he ever touches any child. However, he becomes elated and forgives Duck when Maksim reports he has the forged documents ready for Bill. Bill celebrates with Duck, offering his house and his job to him, so Duck can close the clinic and stop working with kids. Venting his frustrations with Bill, Duck casually reveals he was the one who had been anonymously texting Leo. A security guard stops them for a casual theft, and Bill threatens to kill the guard. When Duck intervenes, Bill strikes him. Upset by this treatment, Duck texts Leo that Bill is headed for the club. Leo uses a support beam from the bed he made to beat up Maksim's group and takes Bill's forged documents.

In Bill's house, Leo finds a wounded Simsek and Naadirah's corpse in a bag. Bill murdered Naadirah, who was saving money to pay to have him deported. After killing Simsek, Bill attacks Leo, who impales him with his own knife. Duck later appears, refuses to take Bill to a hospital, and instead, turns the surveillance camera installed in Josie's room towards Bill's face, threatening to make him see Duck raping her.

Duck knocks out Leo and implants an electrolarynx so he can make Leo apologize for killing Bill. When Leo refuses, Duck takes him to the bridge in the one photo Leo has of Naadirah. Duck took the picture on a trip with Naadirah and Bill. Leo refuses to apologize, takes a breath and throws both of them into the water. Drowning Duck, Leo swims to the surface, finds Josie at the bridge's edge and uses his new voice to warn her away from the danger. Both of them safe, Leo tells Josie he will take her to her maternal grandmother.

== Cast ==
- Alexander Skarsgård as Leo, a man left mute from a childhood accident
  - Levi Eisenblätter as young Leo
- Paul Rudd as Cactus Bill, an American surgeon
- Justin Theroux as Duck, Bill's partner and best friend
- Seyneb Saleh as Naadirah, Leo's girlfriend
- Robert Sheehan as Luba
- Gilbert Owuor as Maksim
- Jannis Niewöhner as Nicky Simsek
- Robert Kazinsky as Rob
- Noel Clarke as Stuart
- Dominic Monaghan as Oswald
- Mia-Sophie and Lea-Marie Bastin as Josie
- Florence Kasumba as Tanya
- Ulf Herman as Gunther
- Anja Karmanski as Kathy
- Sam Rockwell as Sam Bell (uncredited cameo)

== Production ==
The film was in development hell for many years, but Jones always said he wished to direct it and has described it as a "spiritual sequel" to Moon, heavily inspired by the Ridley Scott film Blade Runner (1982). During the film's development, Jones had expressed his desire for Sam Rockwell to reprise his role from Moon in a cameo appearance that was to act as an epilogue for the character, and that the film would be the second installment in a trilogy consisting of Moon, Mute, and a yet to be announced third film. In October 2016, Justin Theroux officially joined the cast, joining Skarsgård, Rudd, Noel Clarke and Florence Kasumba.

=== Filming ===
Filming began on September 28, 2016. The film was shot on site in Berlin by cinematographer Gary Shaw, who worked with Jones on Moon.

=== Music ===
Clint Mansell composed the film's score. In a series of Instagram posts titled Mute & Me, he cited the culture of 20th century Berlin as a major influence, claiming that "Berlin has been, and continues to be, a cultural hot bed of our times". Mansell drew from multiple forms of Berlin culture, including "poets and artists, musicians and philosophers, dreamers and drunks, lovers and the lost and lonely, the wild, the beautiful, and the damned". During background research for the film, Mansell claimed to have drawn inspiration from works of German expressionism such as Metropolis, the crime drama M, as well as works of classical and contemporary film noir like Out of the Past, In A Lonely Place, The Asphalt Jungle, Cape Fear, Chinatown, Brick, and Blood Simple.

Mansell also looked at the works of New German Cinema filmmakers like Werner Herzog, Rainer Werner Fassbinder, and Wim Wenders. He points to Fassbinder's World on a Wire as a specific sci-fi influence from that era. He also looked at the krautrock group Popul Vuh and their collaborations with Herzog on Aguirre, Wrath of God, and Nosferatu the Vampyre. Mansell cited Jones's father David Bowie's Berlin Trilogy of albums as being a major influence in terms of representing Berlin culture, along with other Brian Eno-produced albums like Ultravox!

== Release ==
Originally scheduled for release in 2017, Mute was released on Netflix on 23 February 2018.

=== Marketing ===
The film was heavily promoted and discussed by Jones on Twitter with production stills and concept art. On 6 January 2017 three stills from the film were released, showing characters Leo, Cactus Bill, and Duck with the backdrop of a futuristic Berlin.

=== Critical response ===
On the review aggregator website Rotten Tomatoes, the film holds an approval rating of 21% based on 86 reviews, with an average rating of 4.4/10. The website's critics consensus reads, "Visually polished but narratively derivative and overall muddled, Mute is a would-be sci-fi epic whose title serves as an unfortunate guide to how it might be best enjoyed." On Metacritic, which uses a weighted average, the film received a score of 35 out of 100, based on 24 critics, indicating "generally unfavorable" reviews.
