= Henry Hübchen =

German actor (born 1947)

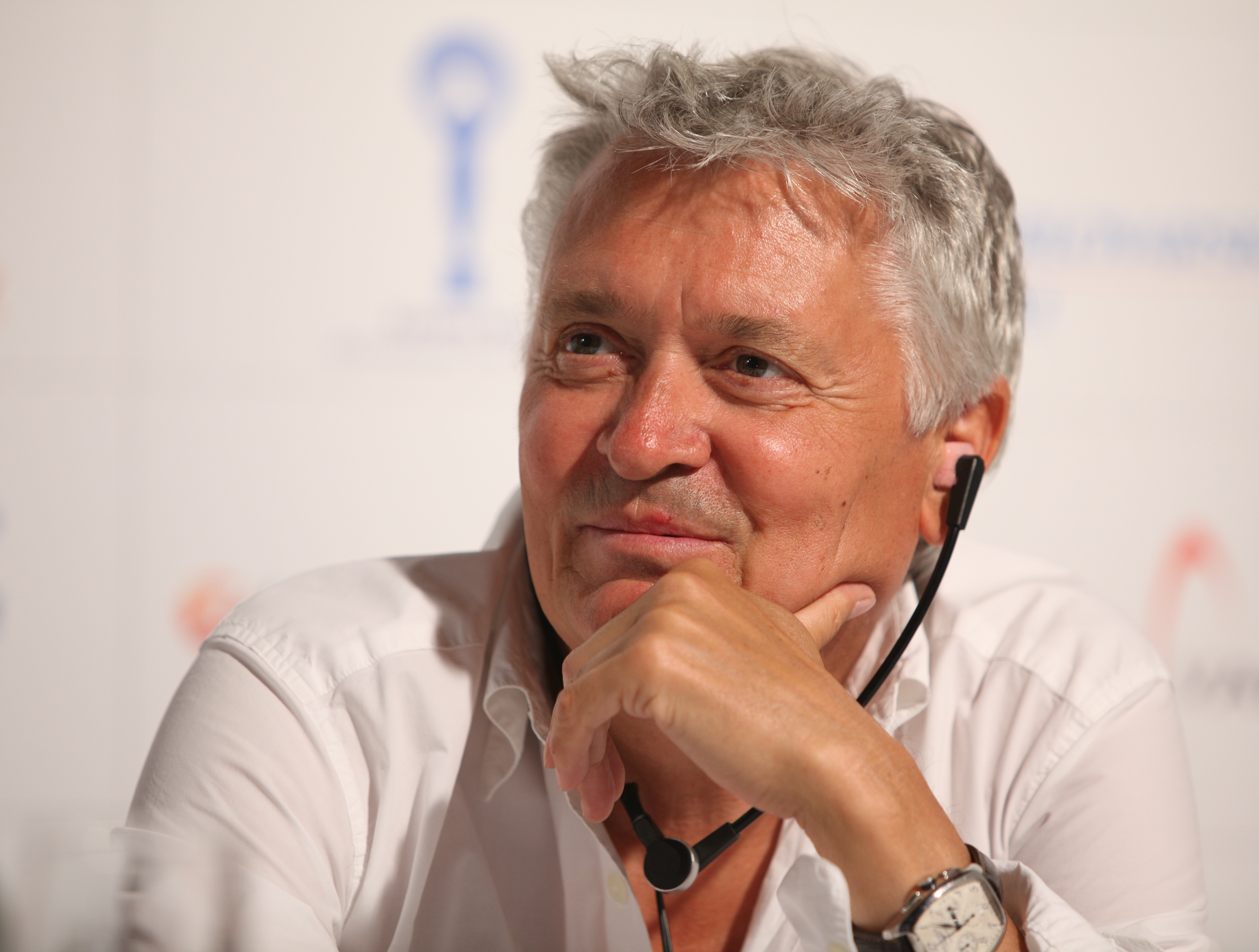
- Henry Hübchen in Karlovy Vary (2009)
- Born: East Berlin, East Germany
- Occupation: actor
- Years active: 1971?–present
- Awards: Deutscher Filmpreis, Best Actor 2005 Alles auf Zucker!

Henry Hübchen is a German actor. He is known for playing the title character in the award-winning 2004 film Alles auf Zucker! (Go for Zucker!), for which he won a Deutscher Filmpreis (Lola). Hübchen plays Gregor Klein in the 2026 Netflix spy drama series Unfamiliar.

== Early life and education ==
Henry Hübchen was born and raised in East Berlin, in what was then East Germany.

Before coming to film, he was a failed physics student, wrote songs for the 1970s East German rock group City, and was twice East German windsurfing champion (in 1980 and 1981).

He studied drama in Berlin and Magdeburg.

== Career ==
In 2004, Hübchen was best known in Germany for a role on the long-running television series Polizeiruf 110.

Hübchen plays Gregor Klein in the 2026 Netflix spy drama series Unfamiliar.

== Recognition and awards ==
He won the Berlin Theater Award (Theaterpreis Berlin) in 2000.

Hübchen's performance in Go for Zucker! was praised by critic David Denby and Stephen Holden of The New York Times, and earned him a Lola, Germany's equivalent of an Oscar.

== Personal life ==
He has two daughters with his wife Sanna Hübchen.

== Selected filmography ==
- Pauline In Between (1993)
- The Big Mambo (1998)
- Waiting Means Death (1999, TV film)
- Sonnenallee (1999)
- Sass (2001)
- Polizeiruf 110 (2003–2005, TV series, 5 episodes)
- C(r)ook (2004)
- Go for Zucker (2004)
- The News (2005, TV film)
- Mordshunger (2008, TV film)
- Age and Beauty (2008)
- Whiskey with Vodka (2009)
- Lila, Lila (2009)
- Young Goethe in Love (2010)
- Easter Goes Polish (2011)
- Jesus Loves Me (2012)
- Shark Alarm at Müggel Lake (2013)
- Quality Time (2013)
- The Interpreter of Silence (2023)
