= Mario (2018 film) =

2018 Swiss film directed by Marcel Gisler

- Theatrical release poster
- Directed by: Marcel Gisler
- Screenplay by: Thomas Hess; Marcel Gisler; Frédéric Moriette
- Story by: Thomas Hess
- Produced by: Rudolf Santschi
- Starring: Max Hubacher; Aaron Altaras; Jessy Moravec; Doro Müggler; Jürg Plüss; Andreas Matti; Joris Gratwohl; Beat Marti; Matthias Neukirch
- Cinematography: Sophie Maintigneux
- Edited by: Thomas Bachmann
- Music by: Martin Skalsky; Christian Schlumpf; Michael Duss
- Production companies: Triluna Film; Carac Films; Schweizer Radio und Fernsehen; SRG SSR; Teleclub
- Distributed by: Frenetic Films
- Release dates: 27 January 2018 (Solothurn Film Festival); 22 February 2018 (German-speaking Switzerland)
- Running time: 124 minutes
- Country: Switzerland
- Language: Swiss German
- Box office: $349,931

Mario is a 2018 Swiss romantic sports drama film directed by Marcel Gisler. The story revolves around two sportsmen who meet while playing football against other teams in a shared location and quickly develop feelings for one another.

== Plot ==
Mario is an up-and-coming football player on a fifth-tier league near Thun. He has the most promising career in the league and works daily alongside his agent and manager, who is also his father, to ensure he will make it into a 1st League group in the coming year. During training for the current season, the team adds another striker, Leon, from Hanover. The two get along from the beginning and share a flat near the field, where they begin a relationship. While Mario and Leon's agents have no personal objections to their homosexuality, they do not want to risk the public and fans becoming aware, claiming there is a "certain image" to maintain in the world of football. Mario and Leon reluctantly agree to deny their relationship for the sake of their careers and make token attempts at public appearances with women. At the same time, they continue to receive under-the-radar abuse from some of their teammates, and Mario has a falling out with his father over the issue.

When Leon discovers a dildo in his trousers in the locker room, he demands to know who on the team left it. Mario, who has just learned he has been accepted to play first league in the new season, tries to ease the tension while simultaneously claiming he is in a relationship with "his girlfriend", who is in reality his best friend Jenny. Hurt that Mario so easily continues to publicly deny his homosexuality and their relationship, Leon quits the team and moves back to Germany. Heartbroken, Mario puts all of his energy into training, eventually receiving contract offers from both his hometown club and a club in Hamburg. Mario's agent meets with Jenny and convinces her to go with him, citing his need for emotional support. Mario scores the winning goal in the first match of the new season, garnering him press attention. While he and Jenny initially pose as a couple, Jenny says she can't do it anymore.

After trying repeatedly to call Leon, Mario visits him to apologise for his past behaviour. Leon is now playing only regional football because it's less stressful, and he has found a new partner. Leon explains that lying every day was causing him to have nightmares, with which Mario empathises, but says he "is not brave enough" to leave football to be open about his sexuality.

The film ends with another match and Mario scoring a goal.

== Cast ==
- Max Hubacher as Mario Lüthi
- Aaron Altaras as Leon Saldo
- Jessy Moravec as Jenny Odermatt, Mario's best friend
- Jürg Plüss as Daniel Lüthi, Mario's father
- Doro Müggler as Evelyn Lüthi, Mario's mother
- Andreas Matti as sports agent Peter Gehrling
