= Kochel am See (Verwaltungsgemeinschaft) =

- Verwaltungsgemeinschaft
- Location of Kochel am See within Bad Tölz-Wolfratshausen district
- Interactive map of Kochel am See
- Location within Germany Location within Bavaria
- Coordinates: 47°39′N 11°22′E
- Country: Germany
- State: Bavaria
- Admin. region: Upper Bavaria
- District: Bad Tölz-Wolfratshausen
- Seat: Kochel
- Subdivisions: 2 municipalities

Area
  - Total: 105.5 km^{2} (40.7 sq mi)

Population (2025-12-31)
  - Total: 5,424
  - Density: 51.41/km^{2} (133.2/sq mi)
- Time zone: UTC+01:00 (CET)
  - Summer (DST): UTC+02:00 (CEST)

Kochel am See is a Verwaltungsgemeinschaft (municipal association) in the district of Bad Tölz-Wolfratshausen in Bavaria, Germany. Its seat is in Kochel.

It consists of the following municipalities:

1. Kochel
2. Schlehdorf
