= Dead in 3 Days =

- Theatrical poster
- In 3 Tagen bist du tot
- Directed by: Andreas Prochaska
- Written by: Thomas Baum; Andreas Prochaska
- Produced by: Helmut Grasser
- Starring: Julian Sharp; Nadja Vogel; Sabrina Reiter; Laurence Rupp; Julia Rosa Stöckl; Michael Steinocher
- Cinematography: David Slama
- Edited by: Karin Hartusch
- Music by: Matthias Weber
- Production company: Allegro Film
- Distributed by: Luna Filmverleih
- Release dates: July 21, 2006 (Fantasy Film Festival, Germany)
- Running time: 97 minutes
- Country: Austria
- Language: German

Dead in 3 Days (German: In 3 Tagen bist du tot) is a 2006 Austrian horror film written and directed by Andreas Prochaska, and co-written by Thomas Baum. It was followed by a 2008 sequel titled Dead in 3 Days 2.

== Plot ==
While celebrating their high school graduation, Nina, her boyfriend Martin, and their friends Mona, Clemens, and Alex each receive an anonymous text message telling them that they will be dead in three days. The quintet dismiss the threat as a prank up until Martin is found at the bottom of a lake, having been abducted from a dance and thrown into the water while tied to a weight. Patrick, an outcast and Martin's rival, is questioned as a suspect, but is released due to a lack of evidence indicating any involvement on his part in Martin's death.

Martin's killer captures Nina and attempts to drown her, but she is saved by Patrick, who the murderer stabs to death while Nina escapes. As Nina recovers in a hospital, the killer decapitates Alex by slamming her onto the frayed edge of a fish tank. Nina identifies her attacker as Manfred Haas, the father of Fabian Haas, a childhood friend who had died due to falling through a frozen lake that he was playing ice hockey on with her, Martin, Mona, Clemens, and Alex.

The police inform Nina that Manfred hanged himself two years after his son's death, and that his wife moved away, though she still owns a house nearby. Nina, Mona, and Clemens sneak out to explore the Haas property, and are followed by Nina's sister, Kerstin. The killer binds and gags Kerstin, and is revealed to be Mrs. Haas, who is attempting to avenge her son's death (which occurred three days after he fell through the ice) while wearing a mask fashioned out of her dead husband's preserved face.

Mrs. Haas fatally stabs Clemens, knocks Nina out, and chases Mona, who falls off of a balcony and onto a spiked fence. Unaware that Mona survived and has gone for help, Mrs. Haas leaves with Nina, and rows out to the middle of a lake, which she intends to drown Nina, and herself, in. Nina stabs Mrs. Haas and knocks her overboard, but is pulled into the water along with her. Divers save and resuscitate Nina, who they bring to the same hospital that Mona is in, while she flashes back to how she and her friends had taunted Fabian into skating onto thin ice, running off when he fell through it.

== Cast ==
- Sabrina Reiter as Nina Wagner
- Julia Rosa Stöckl as Mona
- Michael Steinocher as Clemens Lugmayer
- Laurence Rupp as Martin Loidl
- Nadja Vogel as Alex Gruber
- Julian Sharp as Patrick Urban
- Andreas Kiendl as Kogler
- Karl Fischer as Berger
- Michou Friesz as Elisabeth Wagner
- Amelie Jarolim as Kerstin Wagner
- Susi Stach as Doctor Erika Haas
- Michael Rastl as Manfred Haas
- Konstantin Reichmuth as Fabian Haas

== Reception ==
John Fallon of Arrow in the Head gave the film a 4/10, feeling that it "had most of the slasher ingredients in check but had zero clue as to how to mix them right" and was "so damn predictable and safe". A second review by the same website awarded a 2/4, and concluded, "This is a decent-enough entry into a subgenre that true horror fans have been wishing a quick and painful demise upon for years, and while there is nothing terribly new or original on view, it will while away an hour and a half of your time with no long term damage. Even if you will have to call shenanigans on the ending". Bloody Disgusting's Brian W. Collins gave Dead in 3 Days a positive review, opining that it was "a slick, well shot, and engaging slasher". Jon Condit of Dread Central called the film "a horrendously boring, embarrassingly predictable mess" that warranted a 1/5; conversely, fellow reviewer Steve Barton awarded it a 4/5, and wrote, "Dead in 3 Days is a solid and slick little film. Here's hoping that director Andreas Prochaska keeps his feet planted in the genre for a while. The guy knows what he's doing, man. Good stuff!"

David Johnson's review of the film for DVD Verdict concluded with the critic writing, "Some moments in Dead in 3 Days soar, hinting at a kick-ass horror thriller, but a too leisurely pace and long, uninteresting yardage between kills hold it back". "This film will fit perfectly on your teen slasher thrillers shelf log with the rest of them. You wont find a lot of innovation but you will find familiarity" was how Horror News summarized Dead in 3 Days.

=== Awards ===
Sabrina Reiter won an Undine Award for best film debut by an actress, while the film itself won "Silver Méliès for Best European Fantastic Film" at the Brussels International Fantastic Film Festival.
