= Unfamiliar =

2026 German spy drama TV series

- Genre: Spy thriller
- Created by: Paul Coates
- Written by: Paul Coates; Kim Zimmermann; Alexander Seibt
- Directed by: Lennart Ruff; Philipp Leinemann
- Starring: Susanne Wolff; Felix Kramer; Samuel Finzi; Andreas Pietschmann; Henry Hübchen; Seyneb Saleh
- Composer: Jessica Jones
- Country of origin: Germany
- Original language: German
- No. of seasons: 1
- No. of episodes: 6

Production
- Producer: Lina Mareike Zopfs
- Cinematography: Christian Stangassinger
- Running time: 60 min.
- Production company: Gaumont

Original release
- Network: Netflix
- Release: 5 February 2026

Unfamiliar (working title Bone Palace) is a German TV spy thriller series set in Berlin. It was released on Netflix on 5 February 2026, and quickly became one of the most-watched non-English series on Netflix.

== Synopsis ==
Married couple Meret and Simon Schäfer, two former agents of the BND (the German intelligence agency) who have assumed new identities, run a secret safe house in Berlin. They live in their own home in Berlin with their daughter, Nina, now turning 16, who knows nothing of their past. When they discover that Russian GRU agent Josef Koleev has turned up in Berlin, with his wife Vera having been appointed Russian ambassador, they are suspicious as to his motives. Various secrets, both state and personal, come to light as the story develops.

== Cast ==
- Susanne Wolff as Meret Schäfer
- Felix Kramer as Simon Schäfer
- Samuel Finzi as Josef Koleev
- Andreas Pietschmann as Jonas Auken
- Henry Hübchen as Gregor Klein
- Seyneb Saleh as Julika Ritter
- Maja Bons as Nina Schäfer
- Genija Rykova as Vera Koleev
- Natalia Belitski as Katya Volkova
- Aaron Altaras as Mark Sinclair
- Laurence Rupp as Ben Krüger
- Sina Martens as Alice Belmont
- Anand Batbileg Chuluunbaatar as Yul Batbaatar

== Episodes ==
Season	Episodes	Originally released	
Season	Episodes	First released	Last released
1	6	February 5, 2026	February 5, 2026

=== Season 1 (2026) ===
No.	Title	Directed by	Written by	Original release date
1	"Sixteen Years"	Lennart Ruff	Paul Coates	February 5, 2026
On their daughter Nina’s 16th birthday, former BND intelligence agents Simon and Meret Schäfer are forced away from the celebration to intake an injured undercover agent at their Berlin safe house. The operative raises immediate red flags, signaling that their long-standing cover has been compromised.
2	"The Truth After"	Philipp Leinemann	Paul Coates	February 5, 2026
In an attempt to identify who is tracking them, Simon and Meret orchestrate a high-stakes counter-trap. However, the operation backfires when they are individually confronted by haunting faces from their past espionage careers, throwing their defensive strategy into chaos.
3	"Belarus"	Lennart Ruff	Kim Zimmermann	February 5, 2026
As the wounded agent Gregor clings to life, the dark, unresolved history of a botched 2010 intelligence operation in Belarus resurfaces. Meanwhile, Meret uncovers a major foundational lie kept by Simon, and BND investigator Julika Ritter begins to suspect an active high-level mole within the agency.
4	"What Have We Done?"	Philipp Leinemann	Alexander Seibt	February 5, 2026
A fractured trust grows between the couple as Simon shares a massive historical secret with Russian informant Katya Volkova, while Meret operates independently to secure a political ally. Sensing their vulnerability, ruthless Russian power broker Josef Koleev aggressively accelerates his campaign to smoke them out.
5	"Starfish"	Lennart Ruff	Kim Zimmermann	February 5, 2026
Julika uncovers deeper institutional corruption regarding the original Belarus operation. Motivated by self-preservation, Katya strikes a secret deal with Koleev and orchestrates an ambush, leading the Russian operatives directly to the doorstep of Simon and Meret's safe house.
6	"Still Alive"	Philipp Leinemann	Paul Coates	February 5, 2026
Koleev launches a final, armed assault on the safe house. Decades of domestic deception crumble as the true identity of the BND mole "Starfish" is exposed as chief Ben Krüger. Katya betrays the couple to secure passage with Nina, leaving a medically failing Simon and a devastated Meret to face arrest by police.

== Production ==
The six-episode limited series was initiated under the working title Bone Palace, The German studios of French production company Gaumont (who also produced Barbarians) is responsible for production, led by producer Andreas Bareiss. The BND cooperated with the studio, providing information to the actors. It was created and written by British scriptwriter Paul Coates, who co-wrote the screenplay for 2021 Swedish spy drama series Red Election as well as a number of British drama series. Additional writing was by Kim Zimmermann and Alexander Seibt. Lennart Ruff and Philipp Leinemann directed the series.

Filming started in Berlin in October 2024, with Christian Stangassinger responsible for the cinematography. The BND allowed filming outside its headquarters on weekends, making it the first ever TV show to film there. The building, which spans several city blocks in the Mitte district, opened in 2019. A high-speed chase takes place in the government district, and the glass facades of Cube Berlin are seen. Scenes were also filmed in front of the now disused Berlin Tegel Airport and on an old runway there; around the Spree Canal in the Mitte district; in an old National Automobil-Gesellschaft (NAG) factory building; and in the Tegel and Wannsee quarters, including the Wannsee Lido.

Original music was composed by Jessica Jones.

Head of Gaumont Germany, Sabine de Mardt, says that the title intentionally "both sounds like "family" and also contains the word "liar". She is hoping to produce a second series.

== Release ==
Unfamiliar was released on 5 February 2026 on Netflix, after being delayed from the original 2025 date.

== Reception ==
Unfamiliar became one of the most-watched non-English series on Netflix, with over 20 million views globally within a month of its release. By 11 February, the series was number 4 in the UK Top Ten on Netflix. Some viewers compared it favourably with The Night Manager

Philip Oltermann, writing for The Guardian, wrote that the tactics used by the BND had been exaggerated for dramatic effect, compared with what is permitted in real life. It is only allowed to collect information through human sources, wiretapping, or analysing satellite images, which it must pass on to the government.

As of 22 June 2026, series 1 scores 78% on review aggregator site Rotten Tomatoes, based on 9 reviews.

J. Kelly Nestruck, writing in The Globe and Mail, praised Wolff's performance, and concluded that the series is "a deserved word-of-mouth hit that holds together to its final moments".

Adam Sweeting, writing for The Arts Desk gave the series 5 out of 5 stars, opining: "The spy thriller is a well-worked genre, but Unfamiliar feels fresh by virtue of the tautness of the writing and the way it's mirrored in Ruff's lucid direction, in which nothing happens without a reason. A splendid cast completes the package, with powerful performances on display at every level of the drama". He praises the performance of Seyneb Saleh as BND agent Julika Ritter, along with many others.

Archi Sengupta, writing for Leisure Byte and awarding the series 4 out of 5 stars, concluded "Unfamiliar does a great job of balancing emotional drama with spy thriller aspects and holds our attention from start to end. It's a simple watch in many ways, but one whose psychological depth and emotional stakes differentiate it from others in the genre".

Charles Hartford, writing for But Why Tho? was less impressed, awarding 5.5 out of 10 and concluding "Unfamiliar is a tale that never fully comes together, though it does try awfully hard. Despite some good setup, action, and strong performances from its leads, the series gets lost in surprising personal conflicts and unnecessary twists midway through its run".

Heaven of Horror reviewer Karina Adelgaard, called the series "binge-worthy" and praised the "well-written characters", comparing the plotline to the 2005 film Mr and Mrs Smith. She awarded 3 out 5 stars,
