= François Goeske =

French-German actor (born 1989)

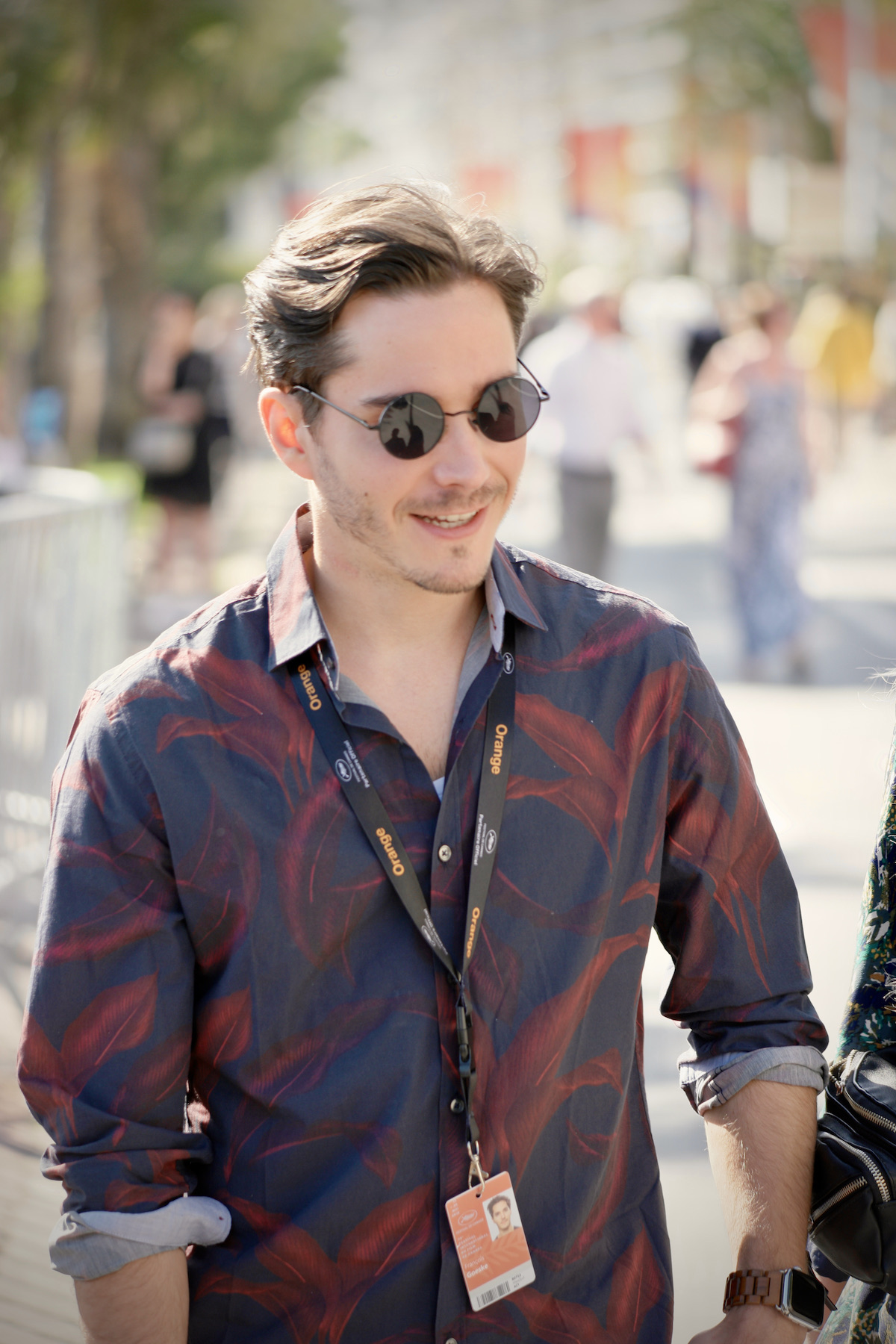
Goeske at the Cannes Film Festival 2019

François Manfred André Göske (Note: The actual spelling of the last name is 'Göske'. Since Goeske's participation in international productions was increasing, the agency decided in 2006 to change the official spelling to Goeske. Still, both spellings appear to date in press releases and on the web.) (born 18 March 1989), known professionally as François Goeske, is a French-German actor and voice actor. He lives in Munich, Germany.

== Biography ==
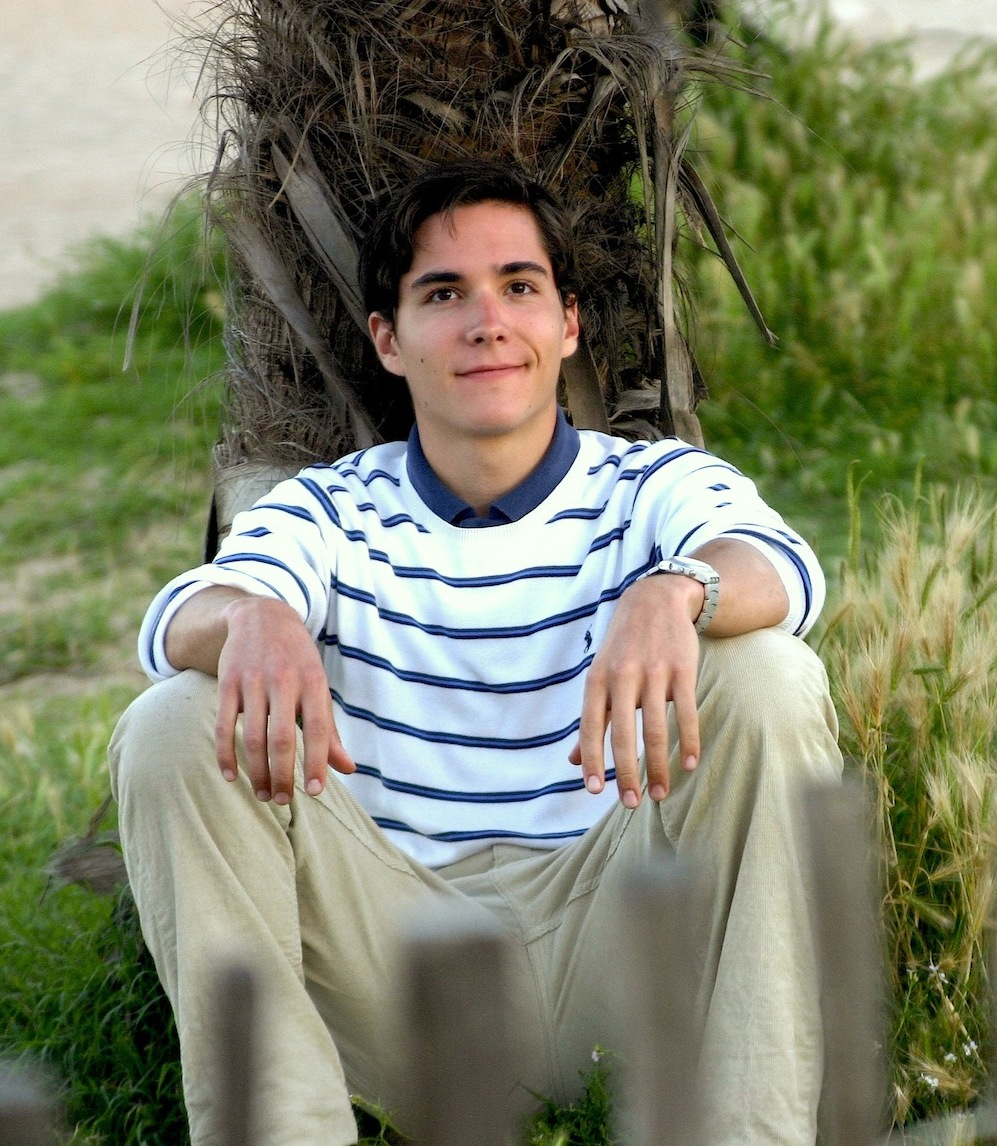
Goeske in 2009

Goeske was born in Saint-Doulchard, Cher, France. His parents nurtured his musical talent in his childhood. During that time, he also discovered his passion for the stage. At the age of nine he was accepted into the children's choir of the Bavarian State Opera in Munich. With them, he was on stage performing as a soloist in La Boheme and Pique Dame, among other performances. He appeared as a leading actor in the Uli Brees musical Teddy – a Musical Dream.

Goeske had his first part in a theatrical film as "Kreuzkamm Junior" in The Flying Classroom in 2003. Shortly afterwards, he lent his singing voice to Mowgli in the German version of Jungle Book 2. Aside from other dubbing assignments, Goeske could be seen in various TV shows. In 2004, production commenced on the shoot of Joseph Vilsmaier's Rock Crystal, which hit the German film theaters in the winter of 2004/2005. In that film, Goeske played the lead role of Konrad. For this achievement, he received the Junior Media Award 'White Elephant' at 2005's Filmfest München and a nomination for the International Undine Award (together, among others, with Alexandra Maria Lara, Tom Schilling, Mavie Hörbiger, Kostja Ullmann and Robert Stadlober).

In the summer of 2005, Goeske played the lead in the German-French theatrical feature French for Beginners (with co-stars like Christian Tramitz, among others), which was distributed in 2006 by Concorde Film in Germany. For this film, Goeske was again nominated for an International Undine Award in the fall of 2006.

In 2007, Goeske played "Jim Hawkins" in the new TV version of the adventure classic Treasure Island. At his side were, among others, performers like Tobias Moretti and Jürgen Vogel. Right after that, he shot a remake of the anti-war classic The Bridge with Franka Potente.

In the summer of 2008, Goeske was hired as the protagonist of the film adaptation of Summertime Blues; the English young adult novel by Julia Clarke of the same name. In the fall of 2008, Goeske earned his third nomination for the International Undine Award, this time for his performance in Treasure Island.

In 2010, Goeske played alongside Liv Lisa Fries in the youth drama She Deserved It by author and director Thomas Stiller. For his depiction, he was awarded the Wild and Young Awards as best actor in 2012.

In 2011, he took the leading part in Lost Place, a 3D mystery thriller directed by Thorsten Klein, which hit German theaters in 2013 (NFP/Warner Bros.). In the film version of the novel Better Than Nothing (directed by Ute Wieland; written by Nina Pourlak), he also can be seen as the protagonist. The German theatrical release was in 2014.

A special TV event in 2014 was the music video "Traum" from Panda-Rapper Cro, which was simultaneously played in heavy rotation by MTV and local music broadcaster VIVA, in which Goeske was playing the two lead characters in a double role.

From 2015 to 2017, Goeske has been playing the title role in the successful ARD youth mystery series Arman's Secret.

In 2018/2019, Goeske starred in the MDR Sputnik web series Findher as a young man who tries to overcome his breakup with his girlfriend with the help of a dating app. In 26 episodes, he meets a wide variety of women and in the end learns to find himself anew.

Since 2020, Goeske has been part of the main cast of the new ZDF crime series Blutige Anfänger (Rookies).

Goeske has been a member of the German Film Academy (Deutsche Filmakademie) since 2011.

== Filmography (excerpt) ==
Films
Year	Title	Role	Notes
2003	The Flying Classroom	Kreuzkamm Jr.	German Film Award 2003
2004	Rock Crystal (Bergkristall)	Konrad	White Elephant Award 2005 (Filmfest München), Int. Undine Award (nom. Best Young Actor)
2006	French for Beginners (Französisch für Anfänger)	Henrik	Int. Undine Award (nom. Best Young Actor)
2009	Summertime Blues	Alex	Several nominations
2011	Pinocchio – No Strings attached	Pinocchio	
2013	Lost Place	Daniel	
2014	Better Than Nothing	Tom Rasmus	
2017	Dieter Not Unhappy	Johannes	Several nominations
2019	Le corps sauvage	Harald	
2026	De Gaulle	Klaus Barbie	

Television
Year	Title	Role	Notes
2006	Ladyland	Sven Rainer	
2007	Day of Disaster	Michael	
2007	Treasure Island (Die Schatzinsel)	Jim Hawkins	Int. Undine Award (nom. Best Young Actor)
2008	The Bridge (Die Brücke)	Albert Mutz	Remake of the 1959 film
2009	Factor 8 (Faktor 8 – Der Tag ist gekommen)	Frank	
2009	Sleeping Beauty	Fynn	
2010	Kommissarin Lucas	Michael Schmidbauer	Episode: Aus der Bahn
2011	She Deserved It	Josh	Wild and Young Awards (Best actor)
2011	Cologne P.D. (SOKO Köln)	Nino Helmer	Episode: Playback
2011	Stuttgart Homicide (SOKO Stuttgart)	Johannes Dahm	Episode: Club der Hexen
2012	Ein starkes Team	Jannick	Episode: Die Gottesanbeterin
2012	Winner Gets All (Schlaflos in Schwabing)	Florian	
2013	SOKO 5113 (SOKO München)	Julian Gruber	Episode: Die Insel
2013	Heiter bis tödlich: Akte Ex	Marco Turtschan	Episode: Morden, Waschen, Schleudern
2014	Heldt	Tom	Episode: Clowns
2014	Letzte Spur Berlin	Pascal Hagen	Episode: Kokon
2014	Heiter bis Tödlich: Hauptstadtrevier	David Droschner	Episode: Bretter, die die Welt bedeuten
2015	Arman's Secret (Armans Geheimnis)	Arman	Season 1
2015	Tatort	Tom Schosser	Episode: Erkläre Chimäre
2015	Platonow	Maxim Wengerow	
2016	Gottlos – warum Menschen töten	Rainer Rückert	Episode: Auslöschung
2017	Arman's Secret (Armans Geheimnis)	Arman	Season 2
2017	Stuttgart Homicide (SOKO Stuttgart)	Lennard Schöpf	Episode: Spielfeld des Todes
2017	Leipzig Homicide (SOKO Leipzig)	Jasper Griehm	Episode: Der letzte Fall
2018	Circle of Life (Familie Dr. Kleist)	Philipp Berger	Episode: Aufbruch
2018	Findher – Swipe left to find the right match	Tim	Web series, season 1
2019	Der Bozen Krimi	Luca Forlani	Episode: Leichte Beute
2019	Professor T.	Marcel Dinter	Episode: Hikikomori
2019	Beck is back!	Moritz Temme	Season 2
2019	Das Traumschiff	Ben Leighton	Episode: Sambia
2019	Die Diplomatin	Pierre Letaut	Episode: Böses Spiel
2019	The Old Fox	Marcel Kaiser	Episode: Knock-out
2019	In aller Freundschaft	Max Volkmann	Episodes: Gnadenlos / Ein neuer Arm für Max
2019	Watzmann ermittelt	Tim Bruckner	Episode: Der Fischer vom Königssee
2019	Morden im Norden	Robin Hexler	Episode: Die verlorene Tochter
2020	Rookies (Blutige Anfänger)	Kilian Hirschfeld	Season 1-3
2020	Eine harte Tour	Manuel	
2020	Der Bozen Krimi	Luca Forlani	Episodes: Blutrache / Zündstoff
