= Over Christmas =

2020 German television miniseries

- Release poster
- German: ÜberWeihnachten
- Genre: Comedy; Drama; Romance
- Starring: Luke Mockridge; Seyneb Saleh; Cristina do Rego
- Country of origin: Germany
- Original language: German
- No. of episodes: 3

Production
- Running time: 44–50 minutes
- Production companies: Brainpool TV; Lucky Pics

Original release
- Network: Netflix
- Release: 27 November 2020

Over Christmas (original title: ÜberWeihnachten) is a 2020 German television miniseries starring Luke Mockridge, Seyneb Saleh and Cristina do Rego.

== Cast ==
- Luke Mockridge as Bastian, an aspiring musician who works at a call center
- Seyneb Saleh as Karina, Bastian's new love interest
- Cristina do Rego as Fine, Bastian's ex-girlfriend, now in a relationship with Niklas
- Lucas Reiber as Niklas, Bastian's brother
- Johanna Gastdorf as Brigitte, the mother of Bastian and Niklas
- Rudolf Kowalski as Walter, the father of Bastian and Niklas
- Carmen-Maja Antoni as Oma Hilde, the grandmother of Bastian and Niklas
- Jonathan Kwesi Aikins as Hagen
- Eugen Bauder as Ingo
- Eve Karpf as Oma Hilde
- Eike Weinreich as Carsten

== Episodes ==
No.	Title	Directed by	Written by	Original release date
1	"Home Is Where the Tree Is"	Tobias Baumann	Dennis Eick, Tanja Bubbel, Tobias Baumann	November 27, 2020
2	"Sausages and Potato Salad"	Tobias Baumann	Dennis Eick, Tanja Bubbel, Tobias Baumann	November 27, 2020
3	"The Most Wonderful Christmas of the Year"	Tobias Baumann	Dennis Eick, Tanja Bubbel, Tobias Baumann	November 27, 2020

== See also ==
- Merry Happy Whatever
