= Jakob Altaras =

- Jakov Altaras
- Jakob Altaras during his studies at the University of Zagreb around 1938-9.
- Born: 12 October 1918; Split, Kingdom of Dalmatia, Austro-Hungarian Empire, (now Croatia)
- Died: 6 December 2001 (aged 83); Giessen, Germany
- Education: University of Bari; University of Zagreb
- Occupation: Physician
- Spouse: Zora Altaras born Ebenspanger Thea Altaras (née Fuhrmann)
- Children: Ph D. Silvija Altaras Penda Adriana Altaras
- Parent(s): Leon and Regina Altaras
- Relatives: Ph. D. Ivor Altaras Penda (grandson); Aaron Altaras (grandson); Leonard Altaras (grandson)

Jakob Altaras (1918–2001) was a Croatian-German physician and president of the Jewish community in Giessen.

== Early life and education ==
Altaras was born as the youngest of six brothers in Split, Croatia on 12 October 1918 to a poor Sephardic Jewish family of Regina and Leon Altaras. He finished elementary school and Classical gymnasium in Split. Altaras studied at the School of Medicine, University of Zagreb. On a third year, his studies were interrupted by World War II and Independent State of Croatia regime in 1941. Altaras returned to Split from where he moved to Bari, Italy. There he studied and graduated from the Faculty of Medicine and Surgery University of Bari. After the war he moved back to Zagreb and returned to studies at the University of Zagreb from where he graduated in the 1946.

== World War II, persecution and career ==
From September 1943, during World War II, he was a member of the Partisan resistance movement in Croatia. When the Split Synagogue was set on fire, Altaras saved the Torah and other sacred objects from the flames. In 1943 he smuggled from Croatia 40 Jewish children across the Adriatic to Villa Emma near Modena, Italy, from where they were transferred to the Mandatory Palestine. In August, 1943 Altaras illegally entered the Rab concentration camp and took to Split the photos which were secretly recorded by the imprisoned Jewish youth. After the war those photos were used by the Commission for War Crimes in SFR Yugoslavia.

After graduation in 1946, Altaras worked as an assistant professor of radiology at the "Vojna Bolnica Zagreb" (Military Hospital) under Prof. Milan Smokvina. From 1950s he was a Head Physician of the "Centre for radiology and nuclear medicine" at "Vojna Bolnica Zagreb". At the same time he owned the private practice in Zagreb. In the 1958 he received his master's degree and started to teach medicine at the University of Zagreb. In the meantime Altaras started to explore the true causes of the death of his brother Silvio Altaras, who was killed by the communist regime of PR Yugoslavia in early 1945. Because of that, in 1964, League of Communists of Croatia started to politically persecute Altaras in a mounted court case. He was forced to leave Croatia and moved to Zurich, Switzerland. There he worked at the University Hospital Zurich from 1964 to 1966. In 1966 Altaras moved to Giessen, Germany and started to work at the University hospital Giessen und Marburg. In 1992 he published his principal professional work: A new atlas of large and small intestine - the integration of diagnostic methods.

Altaras was also very socially active; in 1978, he founded the revived Jewish community in Giessen. With political skill, his charismatic personality and genuine interest in the fate of the "little people", he also served as the president of the Jewish community in Giessen. Under his leadership the new Beith-Jaakov Synagogue of Giessen was built in 1995. A community center was also built in the new building, which is used every year to welcome exchange students from Israel.

== Personal life and death ==
Altaras married two times; first to Zora Altaras (born Ebenspanger, died in 1963) with whom he had daughter, Silvija Altaras Penda, born in 1946. She has a son, Ivor Altaras Penda, his first grandson. His second marriage was with Thea née Fuhrmann, with whom he had a daughter Adriana born in 1960. During his emigration to Switzerland, Altaras was forced to leave his family behind. In 1964 his second wife and their daughter were smuggled from Zagreb to Italy, in a car by his Italian brother-in-law. They stayed in Italy long enough for Adriana to learn Italian. From Italy they moved to Konstanz, Germany. Thea found a job in the municipal building department of Konstanz. For three years Thea traveled between Konstanz and Zurich, where Altaras worked. His daughter Adriana Altaras became a German actress, theater director, and writer. His grandson Aaron Altaras (born 1995) is also a well-known German actor. In 1999, after 35 years, Altaras visited his hometown, Split. During that visit he expressed his great nostalgia for Split and Croatia. Altaras died in Giessen on 6 December 2001.

== Honors ==
For his contribution Altaras received the Order of Merit of the Federal Republic of Germany from the President of Germany Roman Herzog.

== Published works ==
- Radiologischer Atlas Kolon und Rektum, München: Urban & Schwarzenberg, 1982

== Bibliography ==
- Blau, Boris (2006). Studenti Židovi Medicinskog fakulteta Sveučilišta u Zagrebu. Židovska općina Zagreb. ISBN 953-6800-05-5.
- Romano, Jaša (1980). Jevreji Jugoslavije 1941–1945: žrtve genocida i učesnici narodnooslobodilačkog rata. Beograd: Jevrejski Istorijski Muzej, Saveza jevrejskih opština Jugoslavije.
- Gaon, Aleksandar (2001). Mi smo preživeli. Beograd: Jevrejski istorijski muzej, Savez jevrejskih opština Jugoslavije. ISBN 978-86-903751-8-9.
