= Thea Altaras =

Croatian-German architect

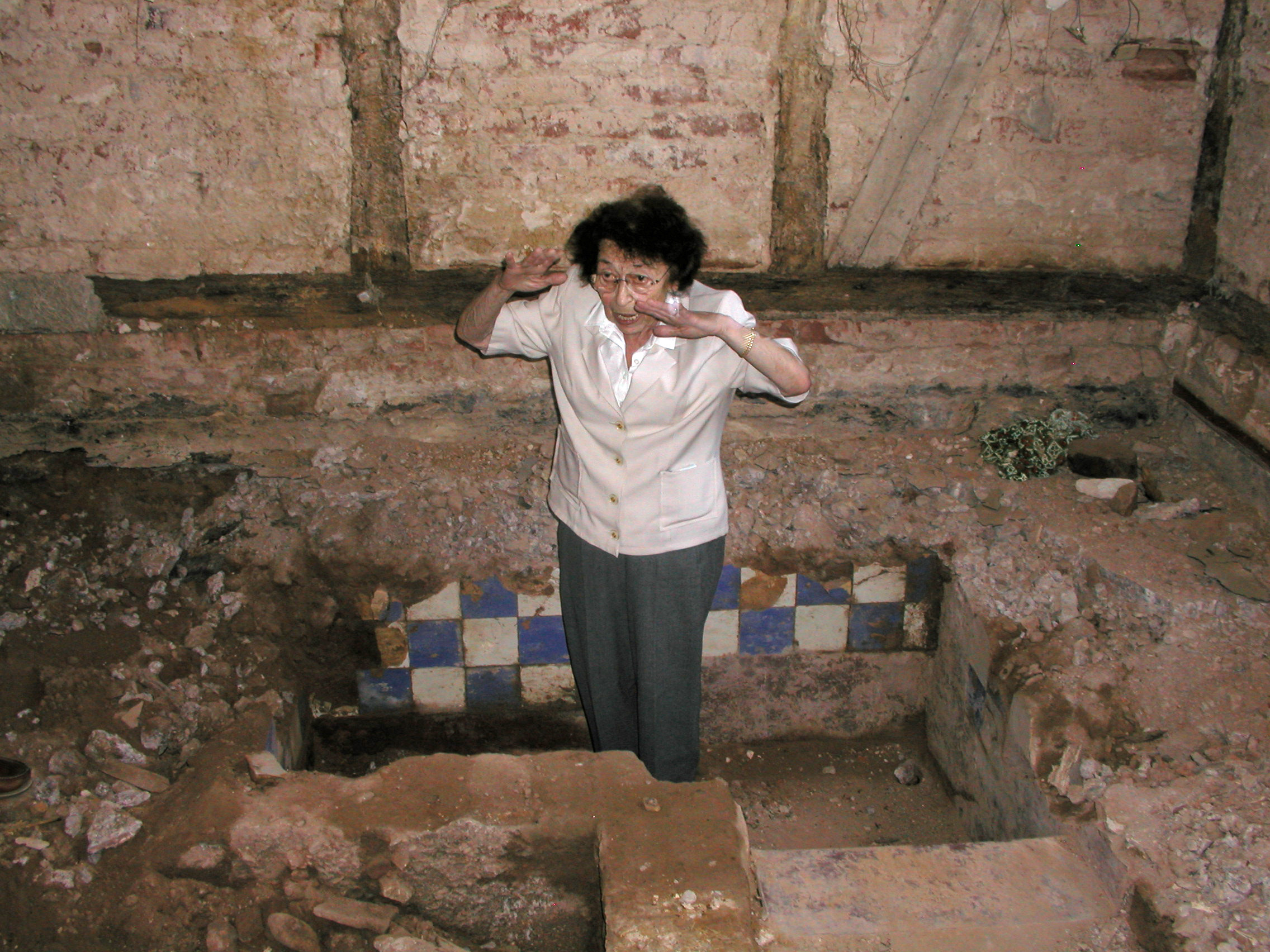
- Thea Altaras in former Mikveh of Rotenburg an der Fulda, after its exposing in 2002.
- Born: Thea Fuhrmann; 11 March 1924; Zagreb, Kingdom of Serbs, Croats and Slovenes
- Died: 28 September 2004 (aged 80); Giessen, Germany
- Education: University of Zagreb
- Spouse: Jakob Altaras
- Children: Adriana Altaras
- Parent(s): Žiga and Alma Fuhrmann
- Relatives: Aaron Altaras (grandson); Leonard Altaras (grandson)

Thea Altaras (1924 – 2004) was a Croatian-German architect who was known for her research and publications on Jewish monuments in Hesse, Germany.

== Early life ==
Altaras was born in Zagreb, Croatia on 11 March 1924. She was raised in a wealthy Croatian-Jewish family of; her parents were Žiga and Alma Fuhrmann. During World War II Altaras was imprisoned with her mother and sister Jelka, at the Rab concentration camp. After the capitulation of Italy and the liberation of the camp, Altaras joined the Partisans with her mother and sister.

== Education ==
After the war, she returned to Zagreb and became a member of the Communist Party of Croatia. She finished high school and then attended the Faculty of Architecture at the University of Zagreb, graduating in 1953. Afterwards, she worked as an architect in Zagreb and later completed her academic studies in Paris, France. Upon her return to Zagreb, she married Jakob Altaras. In 1960 their only daughter Adriana was born. In 1964 her husband was forced to leave Zagreb for Zurich, Switzerland under League of Communists of Croatia persecution.

== To Germany ==
In 1964, Altaras escaped to Italy thanks to her brother-in-law who smuggled her and her daughter into the country. From Italy she moved to Konstanz, Germany where she worked at the Municipal building department of Konstanz. For three years Altaras traveled between Konstanz and Zurich, where her husband worked. In 1968 she received German citizenship. She helped her husband to found the revived Jewish community in Giessen in 1978.

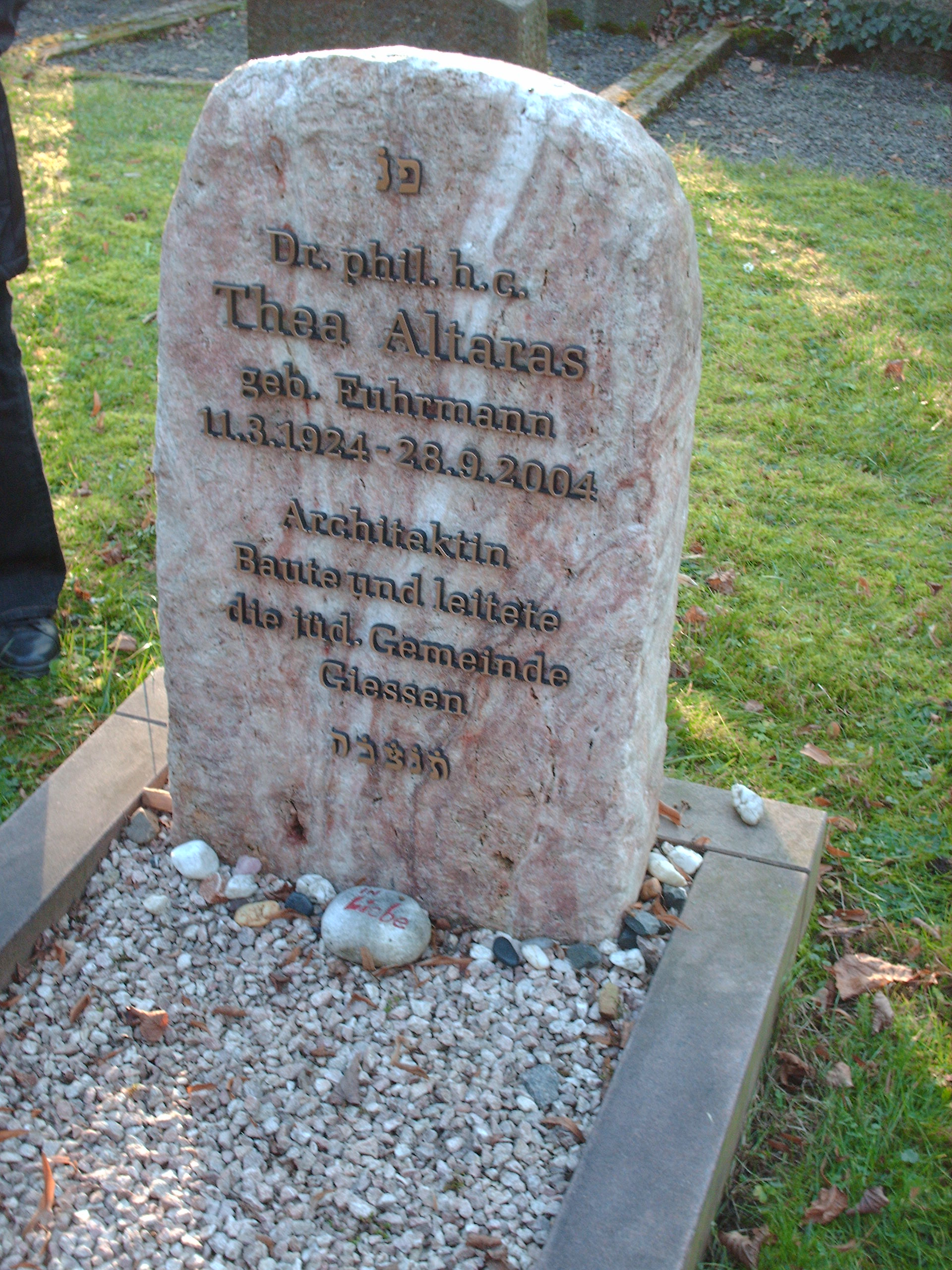
Grave of Thea Altaras in Giessen, Germany.

== Achievements and awards ==
Altaras researched the architectural remains of the former synagogues in Hesse. In 1989 she received the honorary doctorate at the University of Giessen in recognition for her research on Judaism in Hesse. In 1995 she was rewarded with the Hedwig-Burgheim-Medaille for her contributions. Altaras was also awarded with the Order of Merit of the Federal Republic of Germany. She received worldwide attention due to her research and publications about the fate of the destroyed Jewish community in Hesse from 1933 to 1945. During her career she published several books about Judaism. She died in Giessen on 28 September 2004.

== Published works ==
- Stätten der Juden in Gießen, Königstein i. Ts., 1998, ISBN 3-7845-7793-8
- Synagogen in Hessen – Was geschah seit 1945?, Königstein i. Ts., 1988, ISBN 3-7845-7790-3
- Synagogen und jüdische Rituelle Tauchbäder und: Synagogen in Hessen – Was geschah seit 1945? Teil II, Königstein i. Ts., 1994, ISBN 3-7845-7792-X
- Synagogen und jüdische rituelle Tauchbäder in Hessen – Was geschah seit 1945?, Die Blauen Bücher, Königstein i. Ts., Verlag Langewiesche, 2007, ISBN 978-3-7845-7794-4

== Bibliography ==
- Altaras, Adriana (2011). Titos Brille. Köln: Kiepenheuer & Witsch. ISBN 978-3-462-04297-9.
- Lukic, Anita. "Thea Altaras: Reclaiming Jewish Identity After the Resistance". Heroines of the Holocaust: Reframing Resistance and Courage in Genocide.
- Romano, Jaša (1980). Jevreji Jugoslavije 1941-1945: žrtve genocida i učesnici narodnooslobodilačkog rata. Beograd: Jevrejski Istorijski Muzej, Saveza jevrejskih opština Jugoslavije.
