= Schlehdorf =

- Municipality
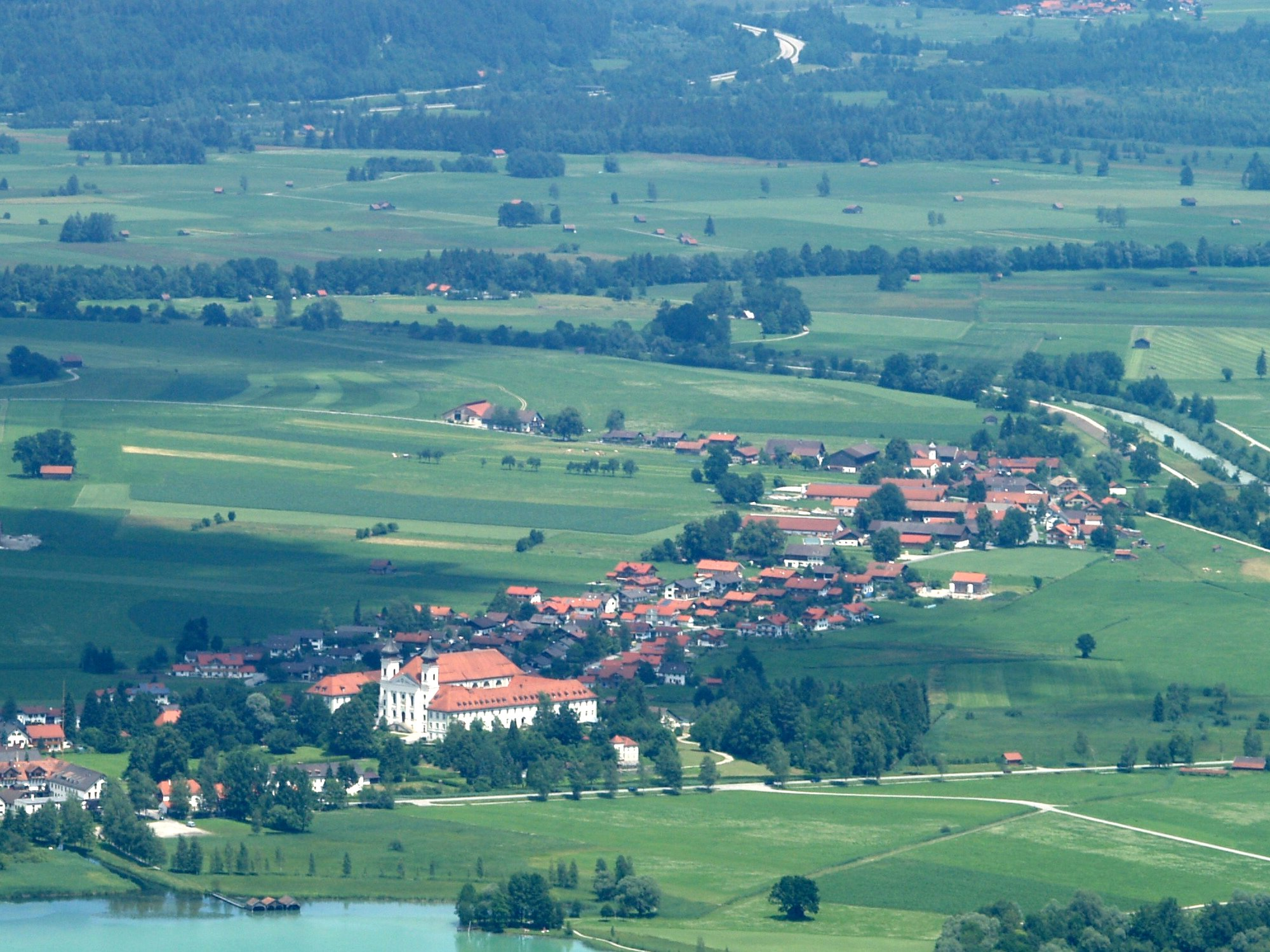
- Schlehdorf

- Coat of arms

- Location of Schlehdorf within Bad Tölz-Wolfratshausen district
- Interactive map of Schlehdorf
- Location within Germany Location within Bavaria
- Coordinates: 47°39′18″N 11°18′48″E
- Country: Germany
- State: Bavaria
- Admin. region: Oberbayern
- District: Bad Tölz-Wolfratshausen
- Municipal assoc.: Kochel am See

Government
  - Mayor (2020–26): Stefan Jocher

Area
  - Total: 25.39 km^{2} (9.80 sq mi)
- Elevation: 604 m (1,982 ft)

Population (2025-12-31)
  - Total: 1,349
  - Density: 53.13/km^{2} (137.6/sq mi)
- Time zone: UTC+01:00 (CET)
  - Summer (DST): UTC+02:00 (CEST)
- Postal codes: 82444
- Dialling codes: 08851
- Vehicle registration: TÖL
- Website: www.schlehdorf.de

Schlehdorf (German pronunciation: [ˈʃleːˌdɔʁf]) is a municipality in the district of Bad Tölz-Wolfratshausen in Bavaria in Germany. Schlehdorf Abbey is located there.

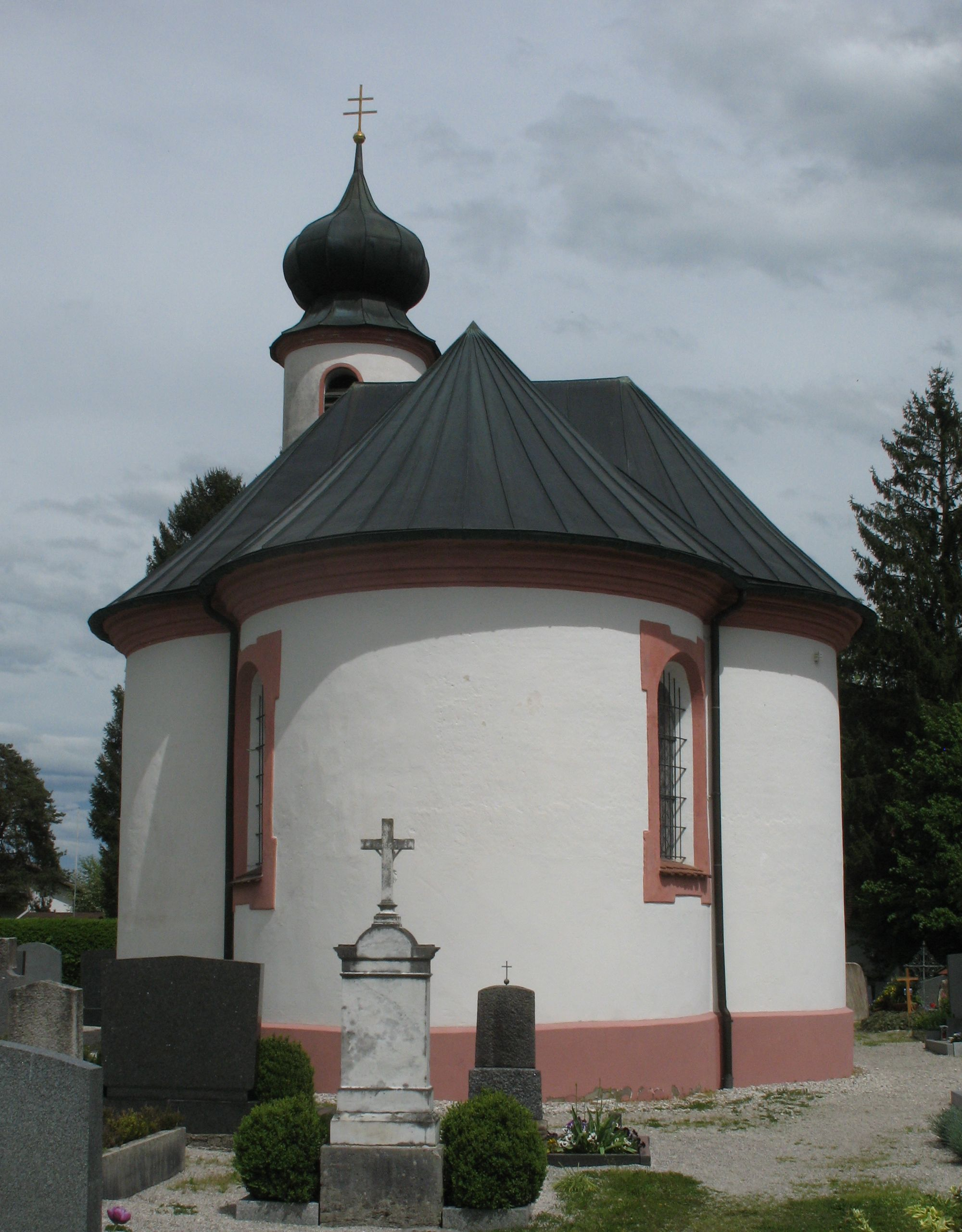
Schlehdorf chapel

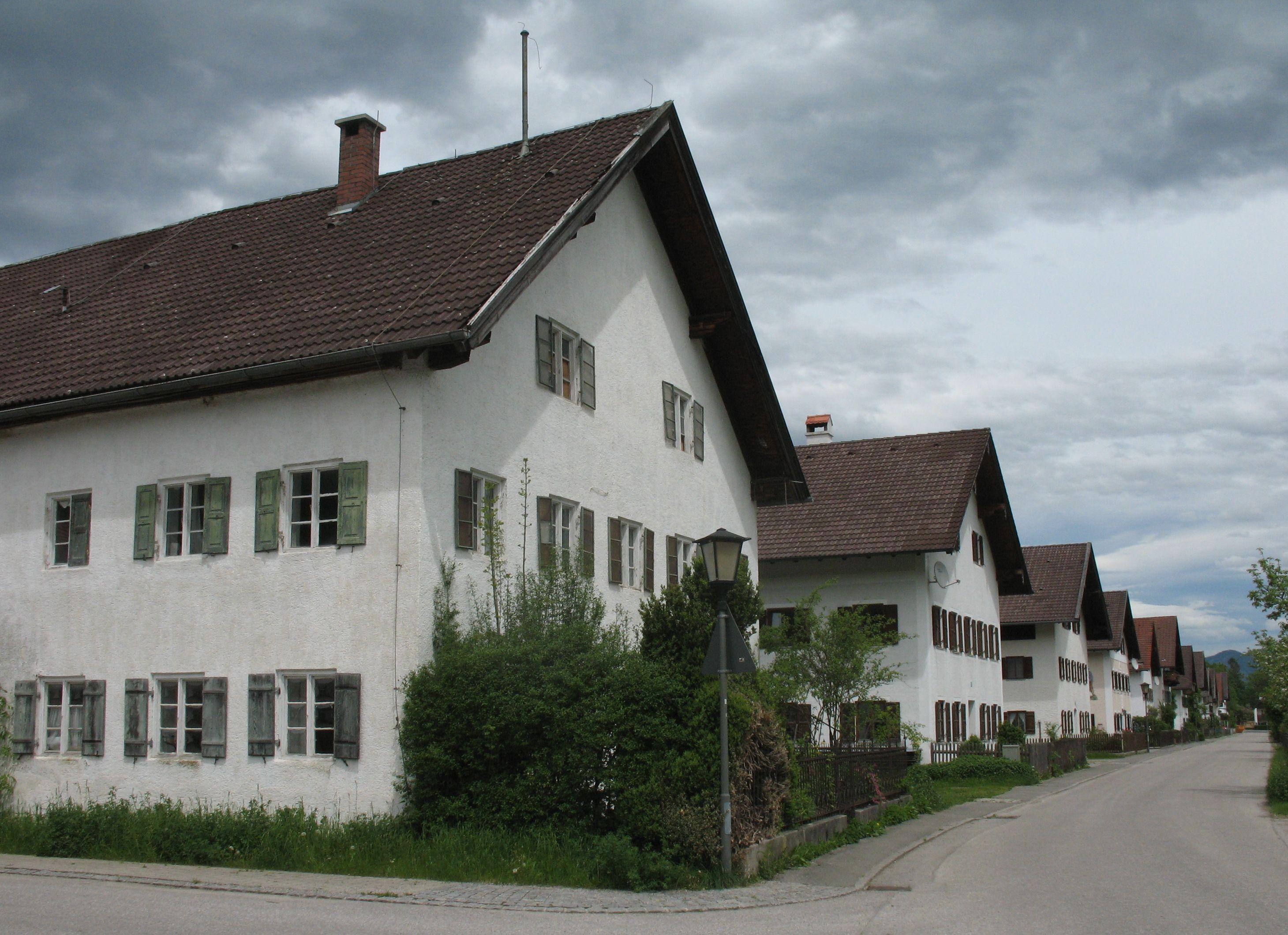
Seestraße

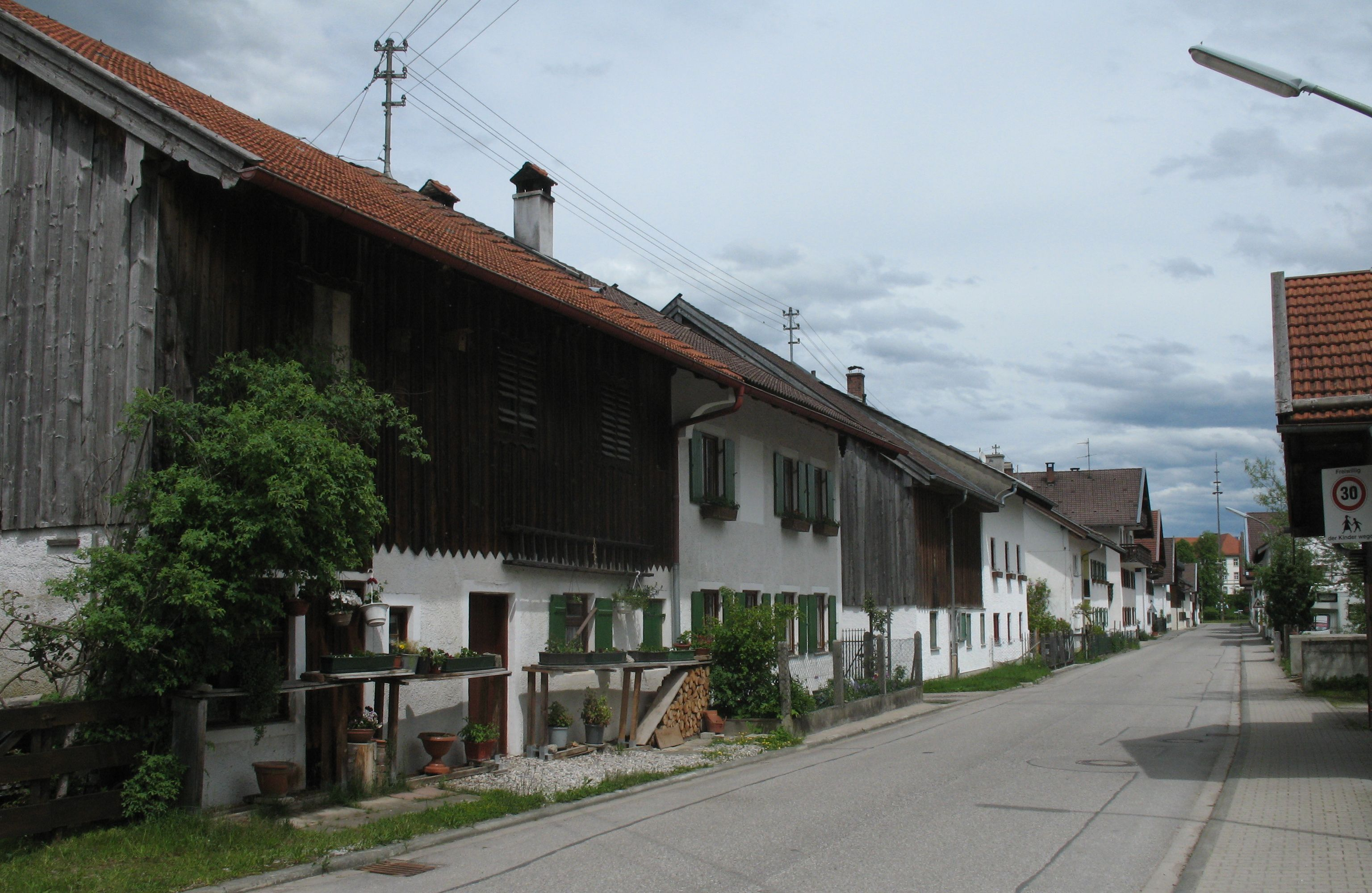
Mittelstraße

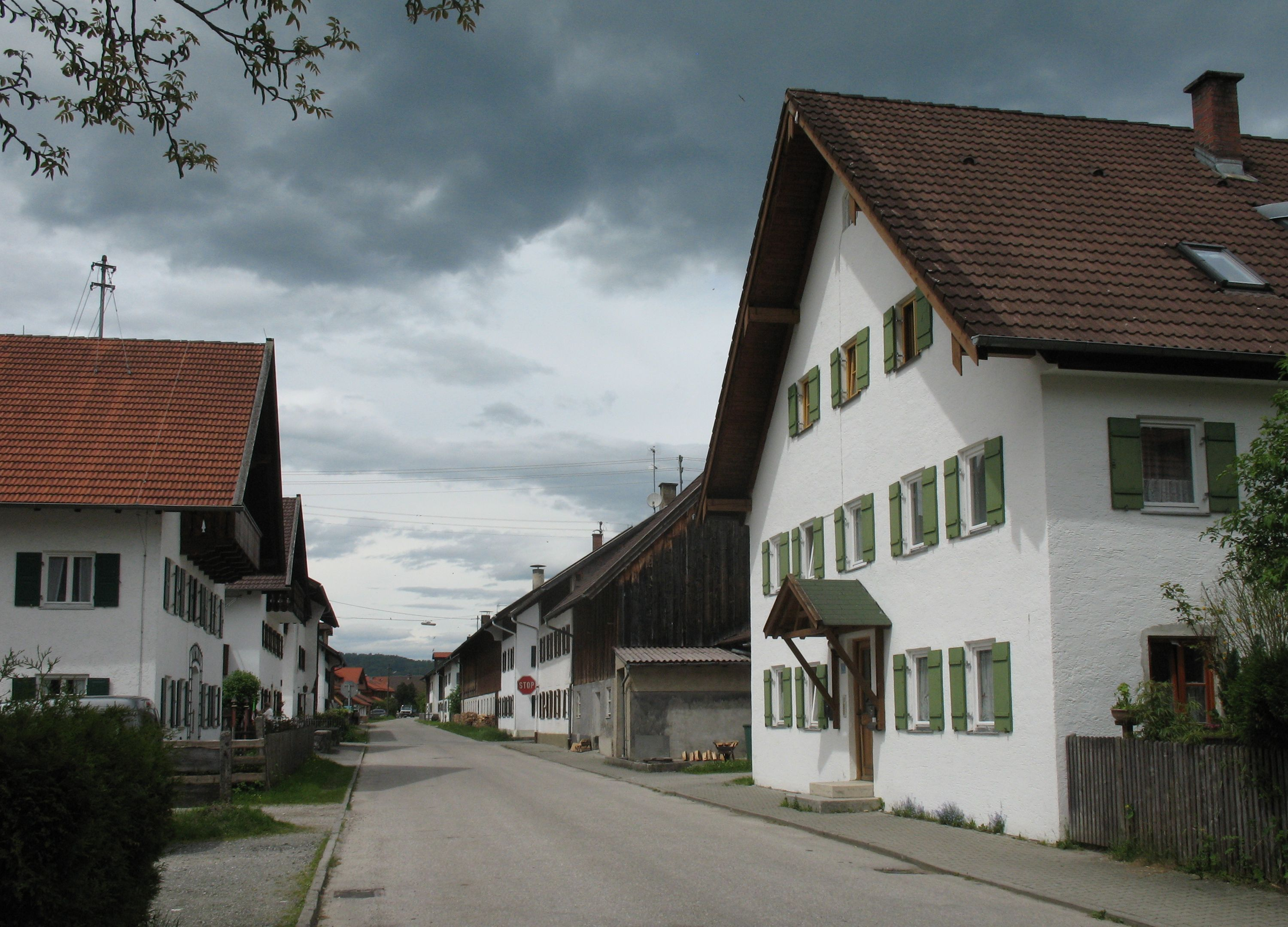
Karpfseestraße

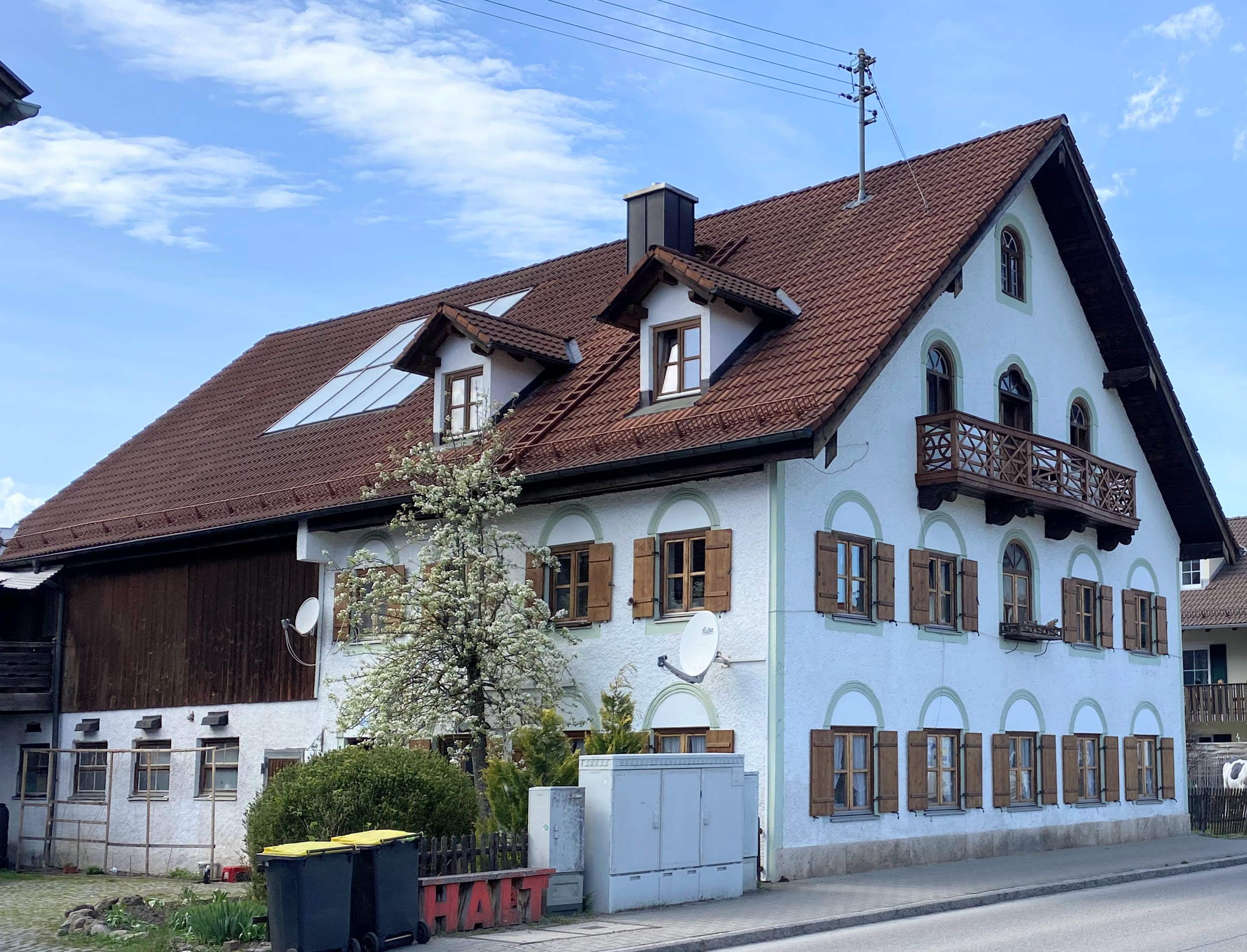
Kocheler Straße
