= Christian Ditter =

German film director, screenwriter and film producer

- Born: Christian Ditter; 1 June 1977 (age 48); Giessen, West Germany
- Occupations: Film director, film producer, screenwriter

Christian Ditter (born 1 June 1977) is a German director, producer and screenwriter who has worked on films, television and commercials. He is best known for his films The Crocodiles, (2009) Love, Rosie (2014) and How to Be Single (2016) and the Netflix series Girlboss (2017).

== Early life ==
Ditter was born on 1 June 1977 in Giessen, Hesse. He graduated from the Evangelisch Stiftisches Gymnasium Gütersloh in 1996 and went to the University of Lüneburg from 1997 to 1998, majoring in Applied Cultural Studies. He then focused his studies on directing at the University of Television and Film Munich from 1998 to 2006.

== Career ==
While in school, Ditter's short films Enchanted (2000) and Grounded (2003) won numerous awards at international film festivals. His debut feature film French for Beginners hit theaters in 2006. He subsequently directed on the Adolf Grimme Prize and the German Television Award-winning series Turkish for Beginners (2007) and on the award-winning series Doctor's Diary (2008).

In 2008, he adapted the popular German children's book, The Crocodiles, for the big screen. The film won over fifty audience and jury awards at international film festivals and was followed up by two sequels, The Crocodiles Strike Back (2009) and The Crocodiles: All for One (2010), which he directed and produced respectively. He moved on to writing and directing Germany's first major adventure film shot entirely in 3D, Vicky and the Treasure of the Gods, which debuted at No. 1 in the German box office.

In 2014, he directed his first English-language feature Love, Rosie starring Lily Collins and Sam Claflin. In 2016, he followed it up with his U.S. debut How to Be Single starring Dakota Johnson, Rebel Wilson, Leslie Mann and Alison Brie. After working with Kay Cannon on How to Be Single, they partnered with Charlize Theron's company Denver and Delilah to create the Netflix series Girlboss in 2017, loosely based on the book #Girlboss by Nasty Gal founder Sophia Amoruso.

Ditter served as the showrunner-director of the Netflix series Biohackers, of which the first season was released in 2020.

== Filmography ==
Year	Film	Credited as		
Year	Film	Director	Producer	Screenwriter
2000	Enchanted (Short)	Yes	Yes	Yes
2002	The Crusader (Short)	No	Yes	No
2003	Grounded (Short)	Yes	No	No
2005	Schulmädchen (TV series, 4 episodes)	Yes	No	No
2006	French for Beginners	Yes	No	Yes
2007	Turkish For Beginners (TV series, 8 episodes)	Yes	No	No
2008	Doctor's Diary (TV series, 2 episodes)	Yes	No	No
2009	The Crocodiles	Yes	No	Yes
2010	The Crocodiles Strike Back	Yes	No	Yes
2011	The Crocodiles: All for One	No	Yes	Yes
2011	My Life in Orange	No	Yes	No
2011	Vicky and the Treasure of the Gods	Yes	No	Yes
2014	Vegas (Short)	No	Yes	Yes
2014	Love, Rosie	Yes	No	No
2016	How to Be Single	Yes	No	No
2017	Girlboss (TV series, 13 episodes)	Yes	Yes	No
2020	Biohackers	Yes	Yes	Yes
