= Mitten im 8en =

Austrian TV series

- Country of origin: Austria
- No. of episodes: 118

Production
- Camera setup: Multiple-camera setup
- Running time: 23 minutes

Original release
- Network: ORF
- Release: 10 April – 29 June 2007

Mitten im 8en (or Mitten im Achten, abbreviated MiA) was an Austrian TV soap/comedy series produced by the ORF which ran from 10 May to 29 June 2007. The title translates to "In the Middle of the 8th" (district), referring to Vienna's Josefstadt.

Repeatedly announced to be a core feature of the retuned programming by ORF's new management, the show received extremely bad ratings and devastating criticism from the start, and was thus cancelled in the middle of its first season.

== Setup ==
MiA was set to air at 7:30 pm on weekdays on ORF1, replacing the main evening newscast (Zeit im Bild), which until then was broadcast on both ORF TV channels simultaneously.

The plot revolved around a family, a neighbouring flat share, and a bar in Vienna. It showed a demagogic mix of stereotypical, one-dimensional characters, often drawing humour from their incompatibility, and mocking cliches rather than providing real identification figures.

The underlying concept was of John de Mol's, and was known to have failed before in the Netherlands. For Austria it was redone to combine Viennese humour and language style with slapstick and sketch-like comedy as well as dramatic elements and focus on character relationships.

== Production ==
Aware of losing many, especially younger viewers to German private stations' daily soaps in that timeslot, ORF wanted to offer a light dramedy-like series with a distinct Austrian note. They also wished to respond to calls for a domestic production, as opposed to the policy of buying in German-dubbed U.S. sitcoms only.

MiA was shot entirely in studios on the outskirts of Vienna and supplemented with a handful of outside establishing shots from the "real" 8th district.

Among the actors were kabarettists Gerold Rudle, Angelika Niedetzky and Christoph Fälbl as well as the comedian and TV show host Max Schmiedl. Most of the younger roles were played by actors at the beginning of their careers. Due to ORF's lack of authors and directors sufficiently experienced in the genre, early production heavily relied on the assistance of German personnel, who were planned to be gradually replaced by Austrians as the show went on.

Journalists reported that test screenings had featured a laugh track, anyway this was removed in the final version and replaced by sound bits.

== Reception ==
The show is widely considered a total failure, with reactions being tentative at best. Critics stated MiA was stuck between the genres of soap opera and sitcom; its screenplays were said to be too shallow to work as comedy *or* drama. Almost every other part of the production was subject to scathing criticism as well, including acting, directing and inaccuracy in depicting Austrian (youth) culture.

MiA reheated the debate on public broadcasting's obligation to—and definition of—quality programming, as well as its balance between license fees and commercial revenues. Namely the show was accused of excessive product placement. MiA was also heavily advertised outside the ORF programmes, including posters, lottery games, ads in papers, magazines, online and even on beer coasters.

Viewers' interest started out way below expectations and kept shrinking throughout the whole season. Producers reacted by having parts of the upcoming episodes rewritten to be less campy, but negative reception from the media and the public continued. Being a public foundation, ORF is supervised by various boards representing the viewers as well as the parliamentary constellation, most of which also supported the strong criticism of MiA.

By the end of June 2007 MiA was eventually cancelled, closing with a hastily written ending that skipped two years in the plot and gave away the outcome to some major storylines. After that, the rotation of Malcolm in the Middle was resumed as a replacement.

== Cast ==
Actor	Role
Iréna Flury	Verena Huber
Barbara Kaudelka	Lisa Moizi
Michael Pascher	Robert Aufderklamm
Martin Maier (actor)	Michael "Michi" Obermaier
Verena Scheitz	Sylvia Steinlechner
Gerold Rudle	Walter Steinlechner
Laurence Rupp	Lukas Steinlechner
Maria Schuchter	Julia Steinlechner
Nikola Rudle	Florentina "Flo" Steinlechner
Max Schmiedl	Ossi Weininger
Angelika Niedetzky	Claudia Holacek
Veronika Polly	Angelika "Geli" Windbüchler
Christoph Fälbl	Der Prohaska
