= Aaron Altaras =

German actor

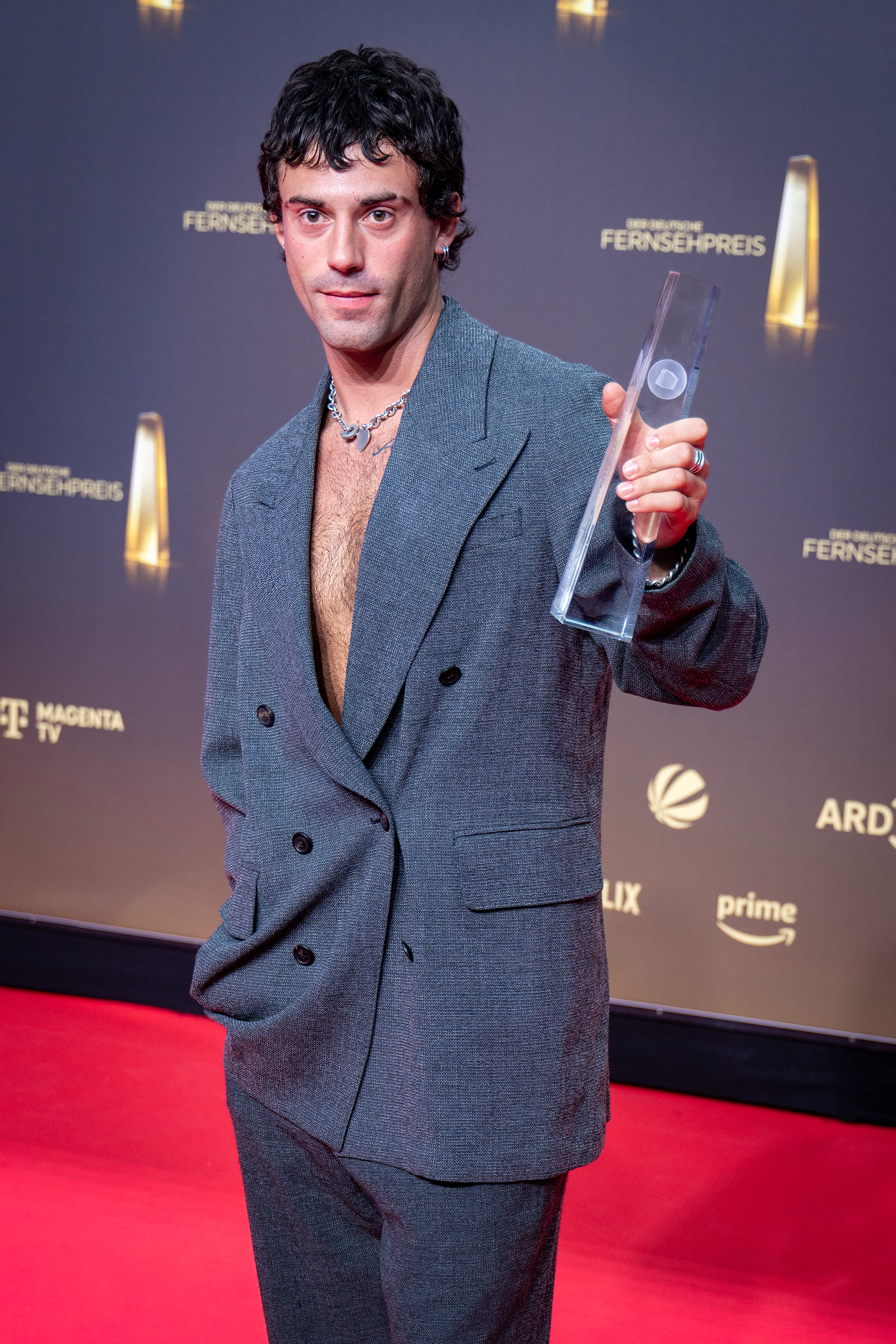
- Born: Berlin, Germany
- Education: Jüdische Oberschule Berlin
- Parent: Adriana Altaras
- Relatives: Jakob and Thea Altaras (grandparents)

Aaron Altaras is a German actor. He had roles in the 2017 film The Invisibles, the 2018 film Mario, and the TV series Unorthodox (2020) and Unfamiliar (2026).

== Early life and education ==
Aaron Altaras was born in Berlin, Germany, the son of Adriana Altaras and Wolfgang Böhmer. Altaras' mother, a Croatian Jew, was forced to escape Croatia with her parents, Jakob and Thea Altaras, because his grandfather had been politically persecuted by the League of Communists of Croatia. His mother is an actress, theater director, and writer, and his father is a composer.

Altaras attended the Heinz Galinski elementary school in Berlin. While there, he was discovered by a casting team for the movie Mogelpackung Mann. In 2006 he began attending the gymnasium Jüdische Oberschule Berlin (Berlin Jewish High School).

== Career ==
Altaras achieved nationwide attention with the lead role in the ARD TV movie Not All Were Murderers based on the childhood and youth memories of Michael Degen, a German actor and writer who survived the Nazi regime as a Jewish boy in Germany.

In 2026, he played Russian agent Mark Sinclair in the Netflix / Gaumont German spy drama Unfamiliar.

== Filmography ==
- 2004: Mogelpackung Mann
- 2005: Wenn der Vater mit dem Sohne
- 2006: Not All Were Murderers
- 2006: Allein unter Bauern
- 2008: Höllenritt
- 2008: Tatort: Tod einer Heuschrecke
- 2010: Tatort: Hitchcock und Frau Wernicke
- 2010: The Children of Blankenese
- 2015: Connect
- 2017: The Invisibles
- 2018: Mario
- 2020: Unorthodox
- 2022: Just Something Nice
- 2023: The Interpreter of Silence
- 2025: Rave On
- 2026: Unfamiliar (TV series)
- The Girl with the Leica (2026)
