= Adriana Altaras =

German actress (born 1960)

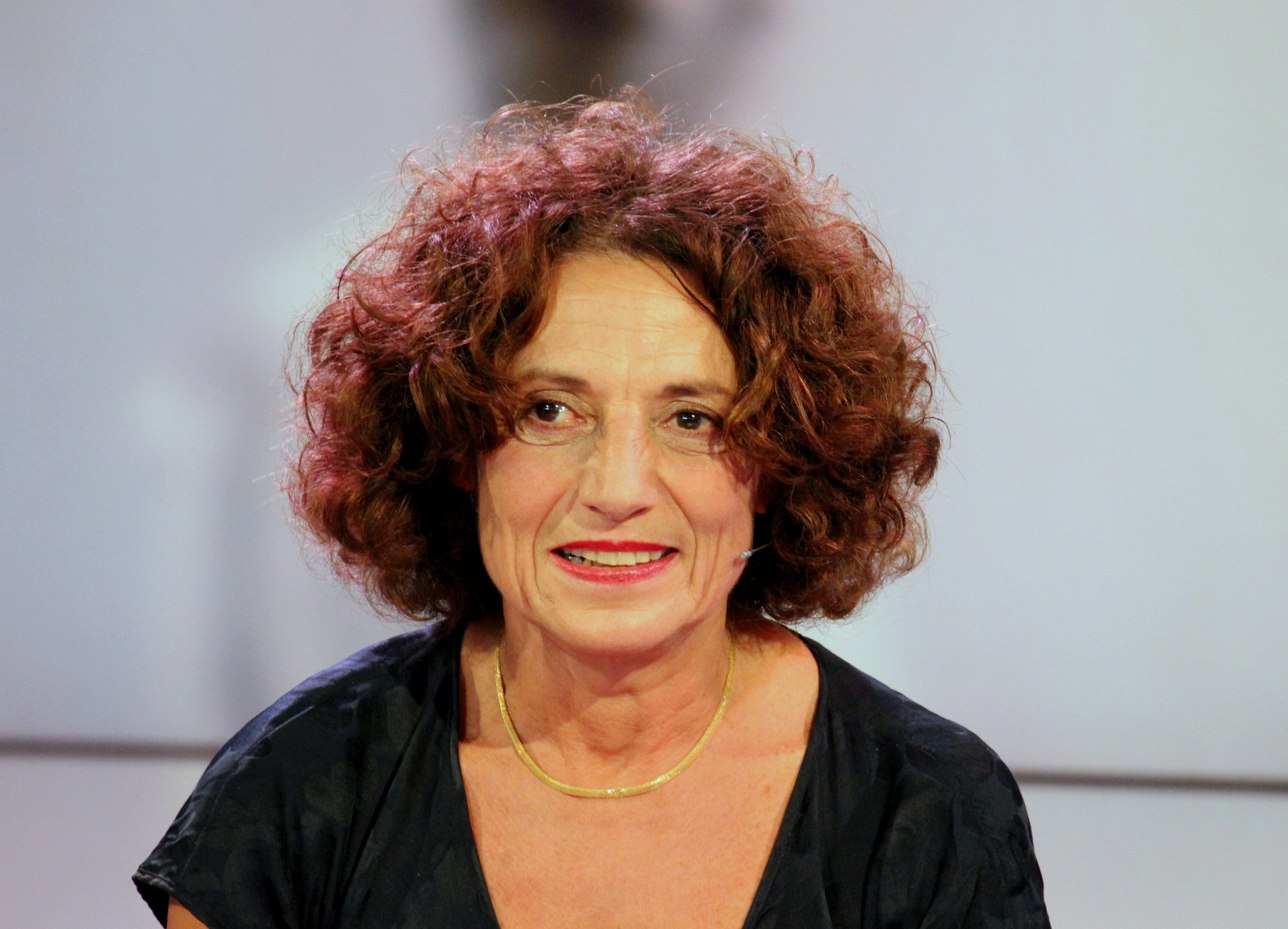
- Born: Adrijana Altaras; 6 April 1960 (age 66); Zagreb, PR Croatia, FPR Yugoslavia
- Education: Berlin University of the Arts
- Occupations: Actress, theatre director, author
- Children: 2, including Aaron Altaras
- Parent(s): Jakob Altaras and Thea Altaras

Adriana Altaras (born 6 April 1960) is a German actress, theatre director and author.

== Early life ==
Altaras was born in Zagreb, FPR Yugoslavia to Jewish parents, Thea Altaras (née Fuhrmann) and Jakob Altaras, who were part of the Yugoslav Partisans. Her father started to explore the true causes of the death of his brother, Silvio Altaras, who was killed by the communist partisans in early 1945. Because of that, in 1964, the League of Communists of Croatia initiated a court case against her father; as a result of this, she escaped Zagreb with her mother to Italy in 1964, in a car driven by her Italian uncle. She stayed with her mother in Italy for a few years, long enough to learn Italian. From Italy, Altaras moved to Konstanz, Germany in 1967.

== Career ==
After high school education, Altaras graduated from the Berlin University of the Arts. Altaras completed her academic studies in New York City. She founded the Western Stadthirschen theater in Berlin, where she worked as an actress, director and writer. In 1982, she made her movie debut, and in 1989 she had a lead role in The Philosopher, directed by Rudolf Thome. However, the focus of her work remained with the various theater projects. She worked as a theater director at the Berliner Ensemble and Neuköllner Opera in Berlin, with her staging of the Vagina monologues, which was shown with different actresses in 2001, becoming a great success. In the cinema, she has mainly acted in films by Rudolf Thome, with whom she had worked since the 1980s. In 1988, she received the Deutscher Filmpreis for her role in Thome's film The Microscope.

In 1993, Altaras received the Theater Prize of the State of North Rhine-Westphalia. In 1998 she received the Deutscher Filmpreis Award. In 1999, she received the 2nd Audience Award Friedrich Luft, Berlin. In 2000, she received a Silver Bear for acting.

Altaras worked with Steven Spielberg's Shoah Foundation as an interviewer and lecturer. Altaras has two sons with composer Wolfgang Böhmer; Aaron and Leonard Altaras.

She is a regular columnist at the German newspaper Die Zeit Online. Regina Schilling directed the film Tito's Glasses in 2014, based on Altaras's book Titos Brille, in which she travels through her Croatian homeland in search of her family past and fights for the return of stolen property.

== Filmography ==
- 1964: Nikoletina Bursać – Director: Branko Bauer
- 1982: Dorado (one way) – Director: Reinhard Münster
- 1987: In der Wüste – Director: Rafael Fuster Pardo
- 1988: The Microscope – Director: Rudolf Thome
- 1988: The Philosopher – Director: Rudolf Thome (with Johannes Herrschmann)
- 1989: Seven Women – Director: Rudolf Thome
- 1994: Löwenzahn – Eine dolle Knolle
- 1995: Secret of Love – Director: Rudolf Thome
- 1996: Killer Condom – Director: Martin Walz
- 1997: Tatort: Gefährliche Übertragung – Director: Petra Haffter (TV series episode)
- 1997: Liebe Lügen – Director: Martin Walz
- 1999: Apokalypso – Director: Martin Walz
- 2000: Paradiso: Seven Days with Seven Women – Director: Rudolf Thome
- 2003: Red and Blue – Director: Rudolf Thome
- 2003: Tor zum Himmel – Director: Veit Helmer
- 2004: Alles auf Zucker! – Director: Dani Levy
- 2006: Smoke Signs – Director: Rudolf Thome
- 2007: Mein Führer – Die wirklich wahrste Wahrheit über Adolf Hitler – Director: Dani Levy
- 2007: Nur ein kleines bisschen schwanger
- 2007: Vollidiot – Director: Tobi Baumann
- 2007: Max Minsky and Me
- 2007: Special Escort
- 2007: Pastewka – Season 3 (TV series)
- 2009: Die Gräfin
- 2009: Germany 09
- 2011: Bloch: Inschallah – Director: Thomas Jauch
- 2013: Danni Lowinski (TV series)
- 2014: Josephine Klick – Allein unter Cops
- 2015: Nacht der Angst – Director: Gabriela Zerhau
- 2019: The Perfect Secret – Director: Bora Dagtekin

== Works ==
- Titos Brille, Köln: Kiepenheuer & Witsch, 2011
- Doitscha! Eine jüdische Mutter packt aus, Köln: Kiepenheuer & Witsch, 2015 ISBN 9783462047097
- Das Meer und ich waren im besten Alter : Geschichten aus meinem Alltag, Köln: Kiepenheuer & Witsch, 2017. ISBN 978-3-462-04958-9
- Die jüdische Souffleuse. Kiepenheuer & Witsch, Köln 2018, ISBN 978-3-462-05199-5

== Bibliography ==
- Altaras, Adriana (2011). Titos Brille. Köln: Kiepenheuer & Witsch. ISBN 978-3-462-04297-9.
- Altaras, Adriana (2015). Doitscha: eine jüdische Mutter packt aus. Köln: Kiepenheuer & Witsch. ISBN 978-3-462-04709-7.
