= Mavie Hörbiger =

German-Austrian actress (born 1979)

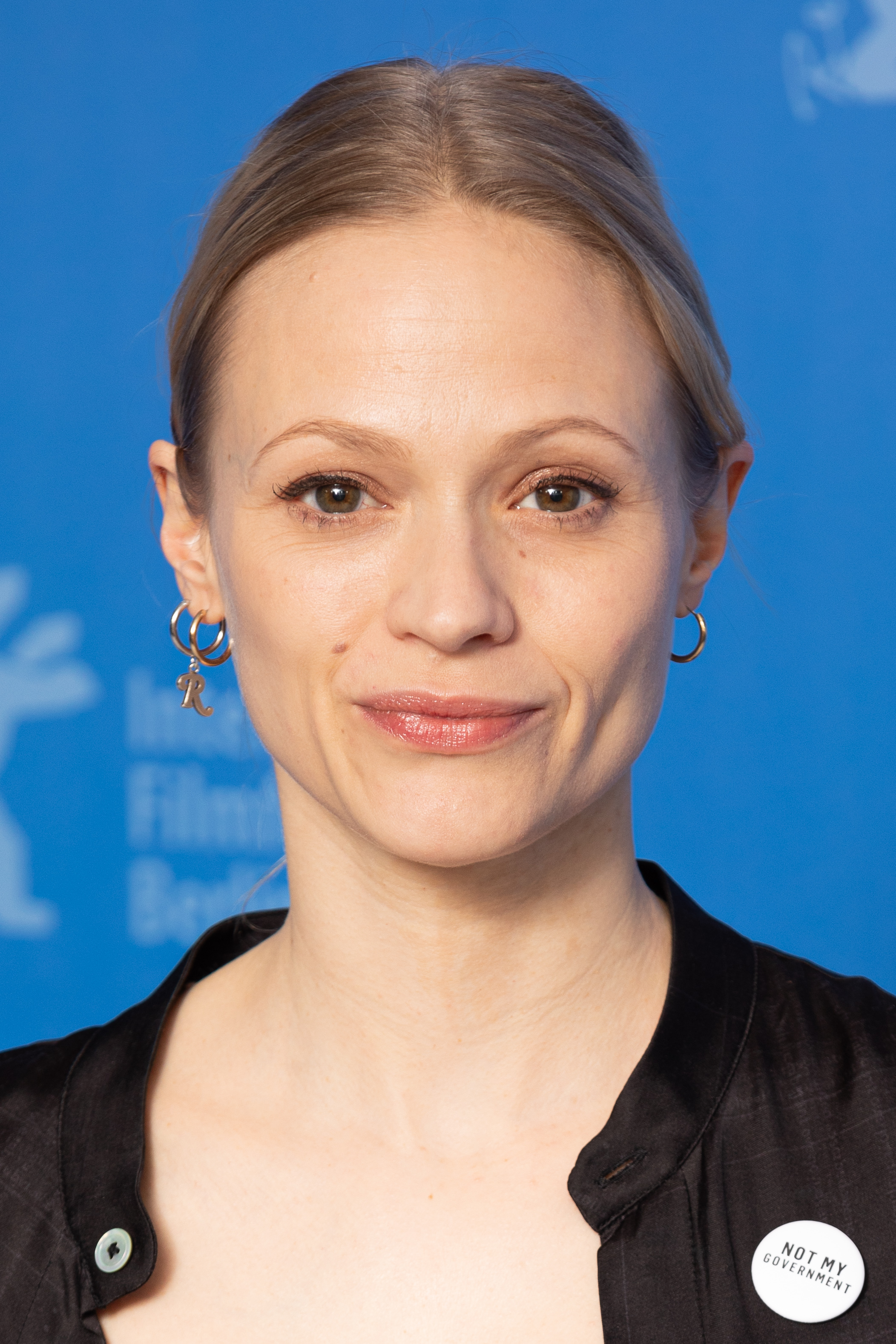
- Hörbiger in 2019
- Born: 14 November 1979 (age 46); Munich, West Germany (now Germany)
- Citizenship: German; Austrian
- Spouse: Michael Maertens (m. 2006)
- Children: 2
- Relatives: Paul Hörbiger (paternal grandfather); Attila Hörbiger (paternal granduncle); Christiane Hörbiger (paternal aunt); Christian Tramitz (cousin)

Mavie Hörbiger (born 14 November 1979) is a German-Austrian actress. Since 2009, she belongs to the ensemble of Vienna's Burgtheater.

== Life and work ==
Hörbiger descends from a famous Austrian family of actors and actresses, all at least for some times members of Austria's National Theatre, the Burgtheater. Her grandfather was Paul Hörbiger, his brother Attila Hörbiger was married to Paula Wessely. Actresses Elisabeth Orth, Christiane Hörbiger and Maresa Hörbiger are her aunts, comedians Cornelius Obonya and Christian Tramitz are cousins. She holds both German and Austrian citizenship.

Hörbiger did not complete college but visited the acting school of Christa Willschrei in Munich. In 1996, she made her on-camera debut in Michael Gutmann's television feature "Nur für eine Nacht".

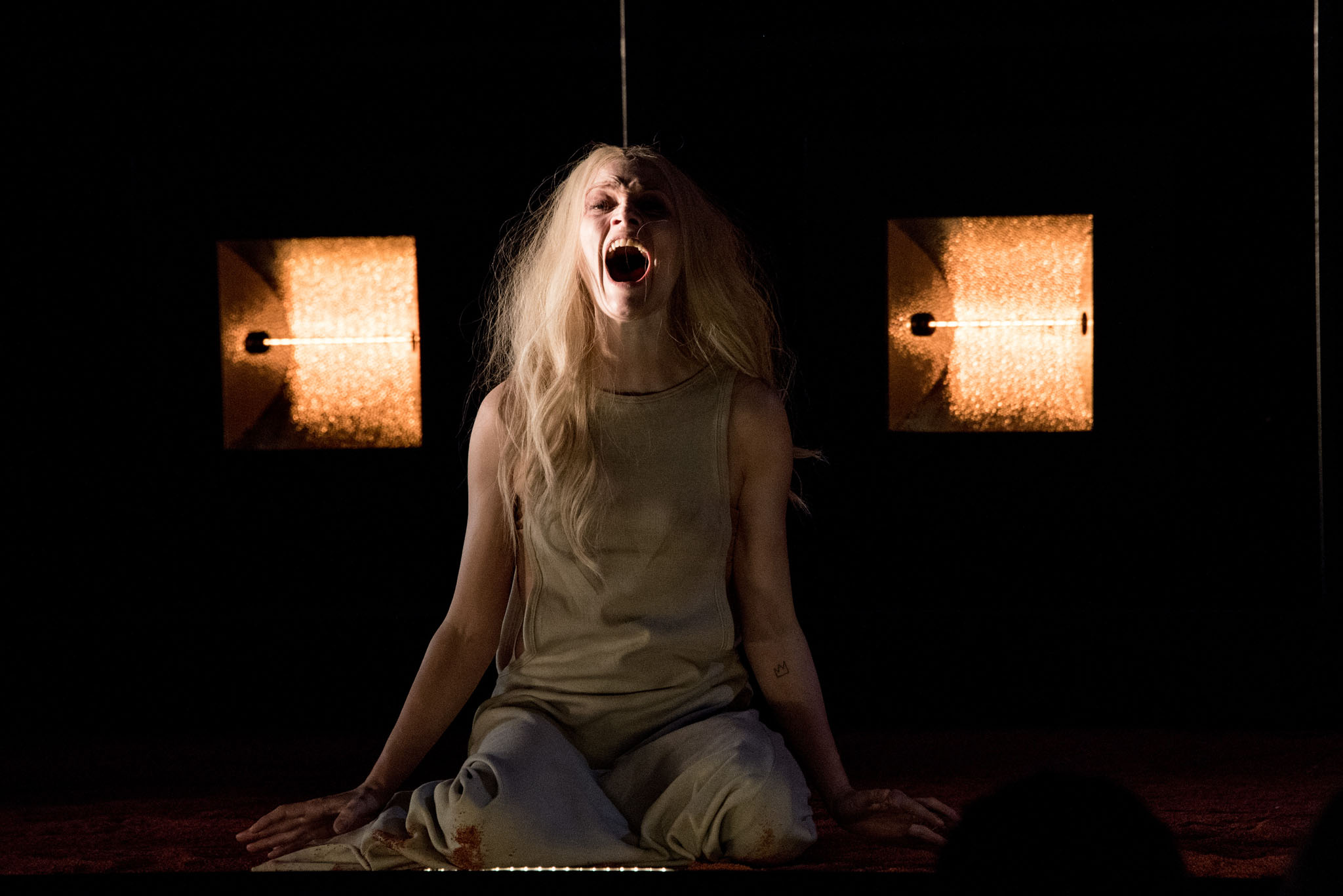
As Ismene in Antigone, Burgtheater 2015

Mavie had theatre engagements in Hanover and Bochum (Rachel in Sanft und grausam, 2006; Jeannie in Fettes Schwein, 2005; title role in Lulu, 2004; Gilda in Komödie der Verführung, 2002; Santuzza in Freunde II, 2001). From 2006 to 2008 she performs at the Theater Basel, her first role there being "Roxane" in the play Cyrano de Bergerac, followed by "Stella" in A Streetcar Named Desire. Since 2009, she performs regularly at Vienna's Burgtheater. In 2007, she debuted at the prestigious Salzburg Festival, as Hermia in Shakespeare's A Midsummer Night's Dream. In 2013 she returned to Salzburg in a leading role in Nestroy's Lumpazivagabundus, directed by the director of the Burgtheater, Matthias Hartmann. In 2015, Hörbiger claimed two major successes at the Burgtheater, first in Tolstoj's The Power of Darkness, then as Ismene in Antigone by Sophocles.

She worked as an interviewer for VIVA and recorded several audiobooks.

In 2004, she ranked third in the voting for the 100 Sexiest Women In The World held by the German edition of FHM magazine, just behind Britney Spears and Heidi Klum. Mavie has ranked in the top 100 five times (in 2002, 2004, 2005. 2006 and 2008) and is widely considered to be one of the most attractive German women. She has turned down offers to pose nude for the German edition of Playboy magazine.

In December 2006 she married the German Burgtheater actor Michael Maertens. On 26 April 2009 the couple welcomed their first child, a daughter; a son was born in July 2012. The family lives in Switzerland and Austria.

== Filmography ==
=== 1996 ===
- Nur für eine Nacht (TV)
  - Director: Michael Gutmann

=== 1998 ===
- Love Scenes from Planet Earth, as 'Nina'
  - Director: Marc Rothemund Cast: Cosma Shiva Hagen, Gudrun Landgrebe
- Solo for Clarinet, as 'Emmie Weller'
  - Cast: Götz George, Corinna Harfouch, Barbara Rudnik, Nikolaus Paryla, Katharina Thalbach

=== 1999 ===
- Sinan Toprak ist der Unbestechliche (TV), as 'Liane Wagner'

=== 2000 ===
- Bundle of Joy, as 'Ina'
  - Cast: Pierre Besson, Anke Engelke
- Fandango, as 'Tina'
  - Cast: Moritz Bleibtreu, Corinna Harfouch
- Inspector Rex, episode Full power (S6E1), as 'Claudia'
- Schweigen ist Gold (TV), as 'Jenny'
  - Cast: Roman Knižka, Horst Krause, Peter Sattmann, Julia Richter, Leslie Malton

=== 2001 ===
- Jeans, as herself
  - Cast: Jasmin Tabatabai, Benno Fürmann
- Vera Brühne (TV), as 'Stephanie Virno'
  - Cast: Corinna Harfouch, Uwe Ochsenknecht, Michael Degen, Ulrich Noethen, Hans Werner Meyer, Hans-Peter Korff, Fritz Wepper
- Vier Meerjungfrauen (TV), as 'Merle'
  - Cast: Hannelore Hoger, Jürgen Schornagel, August Zirner
- 100 Pro, as 'Vicky'
  - Director: Simon Verhoeven Cast: Ken Duken, Max von Thun, Luca Verhoeven
- Zsa Zsa
  - Cast: Max Tidof

=== 2002 ===
- Nogo, as 'Rosa'
  - Cast: Meret Becker, Giora Seeliger, Jasmin Tabatabai
- Auf Herz und Nieren, as 'Nicole'
  - Cast: Steffen Wink, Udo Kier, Burt Reynolds, Xavier Naidoo, Axel Schulz
- Tatort - Zartbitterschokolade (TV)
  - Director: Erhard Riedlsperger Cast: August Schmölzer, Dominic Raacke

=== 2003 ===
- Napoléon (TV), as 'Marie Louise of Austria'
  - Cast: Christian Clavier, John Malkovich, Isabella Rossellini, Gérard Depardieu, Heino Ferch, Alexandra Maria Lara, Sebastian Koch, Marie Bäumer
- Feiertag
  - Cast: Dietmar Mössmer
- The Poet, as 'Rita'
  - Cast: Dougray Scott, Jürgen Prochnow, Miguel Herz-Kestranek
- Fremder Freund, as 'Nora'
  - Cast: Mina Tander, Antonio Wannek, Navíd Akhavan
- Shit Happens, as 'Silea'

=== 2004 ===
- 7 Dwarves – Men Alone in the Wood, as 'Little Red Riding Hood'
  - Cast: Cosma Shiva Hagen, Nina Hagen, Helge Schneider, Christian Tramitz, Otto Waalkes
- So fühlt sich Liebe an (TV), as 'Alexandra'
  - Cast: Maria Furtwängler, Hannes Jaenicke, Jan-Gregor Kremp, Ute Willing
- Ring of the Nibelungs (TV), as 'Lena'
  - Cast: Benno Fürmann, Kristanna Loken, Alicia Witt
- Giacomo Casanova (TV), as 'Bellino (Teresa)'
  - Cast: Robert Hunger-Bühler, Michael Brandner, Martina Gedeck

=== 2005 ===
- Blackout Journey, as 'Stella'
  - Cast: Marek Harloff, Arno Frisch
- Arme Millionäre (TV), episodes 1 to 4, as 'Lilo Rafael'
  - Cast: Sky du Mont, Andrea Sawatzki

=== 2006 ===
- Three Sisters Made in Germany (TV), as 'Guddi'
  - Cast: Barbara Rudnik, Karoline Eichhorn, Stefan Kurt
- Esperanza, as 'Natascha'
  - Cast: Anna Thalbach, Boris Aljinovic
- Die Ohrfeige (TV), as 'Elisabeth'
  - Cast: Herbert Knaup, Julia Stemberger
- Arme Millionäre (TV), episodes 5 to 12, as 'Lilo Rafael'

=== 2007 ===
- Marmorera, as 'Paula Cavegn'
  - Cast: Anatole Taubmann, Eva Dewaele

=== 2011 ===
- What a Man
- Shadows from the Past

=== 2014 ===
- A Hitman's Solitude Before the Shot
- Coming In

=== 2017 ===
- Axolotl Overkill
  - Cast: Jasna Fritzi Bauer, Arly Jover, Laura Tonke
- The Garden
- Lommbock

=== 2018 ===
- Don't. Get. Out! as 'Ida Cicek'

=== 2019 ===
- The Ground Beneath My Feet as 'Elise'

== Theatre performances ==
=== 2001 ===
- Freunde II as 'Santuzza' in Hanover

=== 2002 ===
- Komödie der Verführung as 'Gilda' in Hanover and Bochum

=== 2004 ===
- Lulu as 'Lulu' in Bochum

=== 2005 ===
- Fettes Schwein as 'Jeannie' in Hanover

=== 2006 ===
- Sanft und grausam as 'Rachel' in Hanover
- Cyrano de Bergerac as 'Roxane' in Basel

=== 2007 ===
- A Streetcar Named Desire as 'Stella' in Basel
- Vor Sonnenuntergang as 'Ottilie Klamroth' in Basel
- A Midsummer Night's Dream as 'Hermia' in Salzburg and Zürich
- The Brothers Lionheart as 'Karl Lionheart' in Basel

=== 2008 ===
- Doubleface oder die Innenseite des Mantels as 'Sylvie' in Basel
- Liebe und Geld as 'Jess' in Basel
- Die Judith von Shimoda as 'Judith' in Vienna

=== 2009 ===
- Lorenzaccio as 'Catarina' in Vienna

=== 2011 ===
- Peter Pan in Vienna
- Wir sind noch einmal davongekommen in Basel

=== 2012 ===
- Wastwater in Vienna

== Awards ==
- Golden Romy in the category "Most favoured female newcomer 2001"
