= Julian Rosefeldt =

German artist and filmmaker (born 1965)

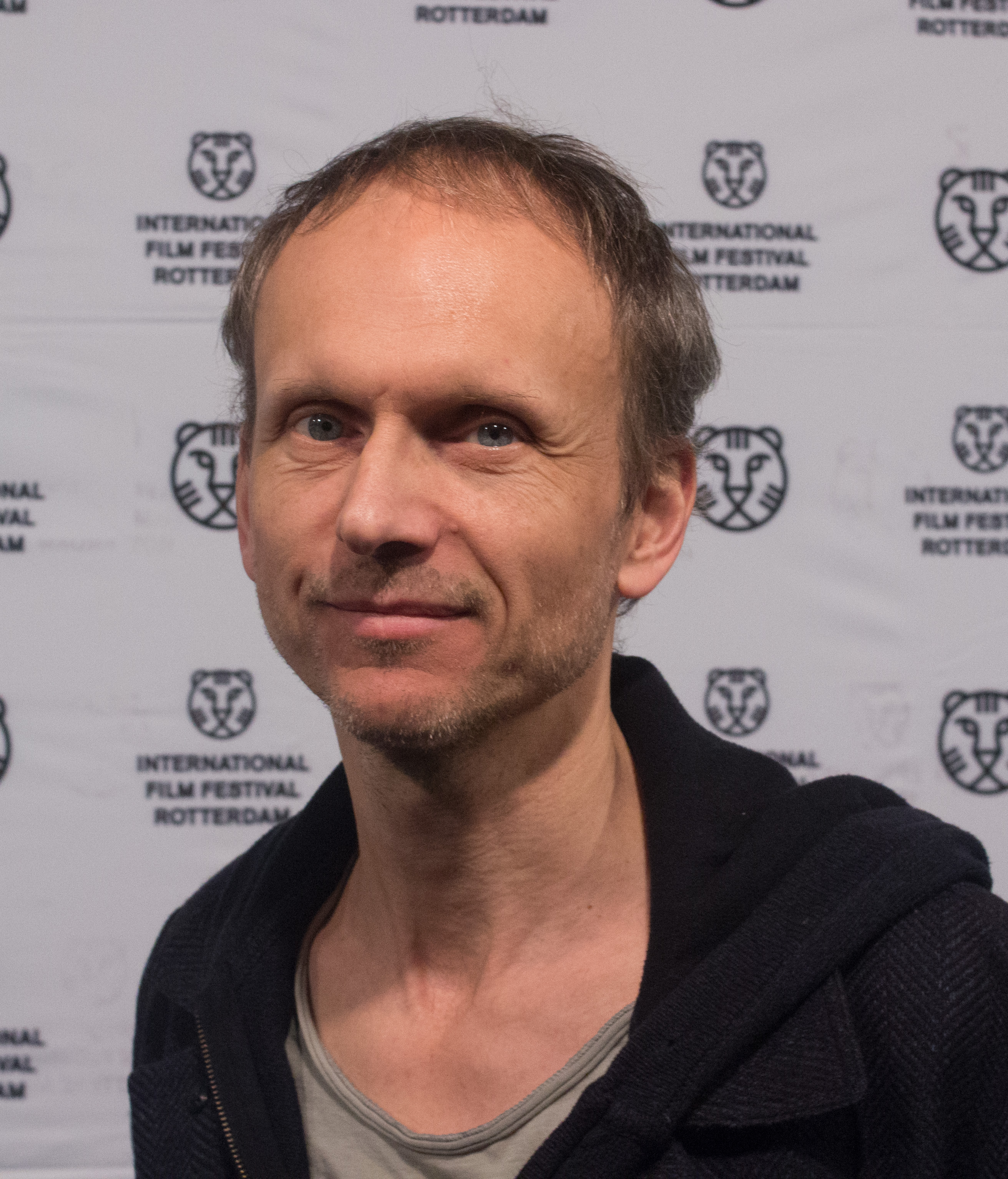
- Julian Rosefeldt at the 2017 International Film Festival Rotterdam
- Born: 1965 (age 60–61); Munich, Germany
- Occupations: Artist; Filmmaker
- Years active: 1997–present

Julian Rosefeldt (born 1965 in Munich) is a German artist and film-maker. Rosefeldt's work consists primarily of elaborate, visually opulent film and video installations, often shown as panoramic multi-channel projections. His installations range in style from documentary to theatrical narrative.

== Life and work ==
Julian Rosefeldt studied architecture in Munich and Barcelona. After receiving his diploma in 1994, he began working in collaboration with fellow Munich graduate Piero Steinle.

Rosefeldt's work consists primarily of elaborate, visually opulent film and video installations. In most cases, these installations are shown as panoramic multi-channel projections. They range in style from documentary to theatrical narrative. In Lonely Planet (2006), for example, the artist portrays a hippie-ish Western backpacker on a trip through India; as he moves through a series of clichéd sequences, including a frenetic Bollywood-inspired dance number, the camera periodically pulls back to reveal spotlights, dressing rooms and other filmmaking necessities. Rosefeldt primarily uses 16-mm and 35-mm film and has often worked in close cooperation with the cinematographer Christoph Krauss.

Rosefeldt has lived and worked in Berlin since 1999, when he relocated as Artist-in-residence at the Sammlung Hoffmann.

In addition to his art production, Rosefeldt also works with the Schaubühne am Lehniner Platz, often collaborating with its head and creative director Thomas Ostermeier. In 2009, Rosefeldt was invited as a guest professor by the Media Art and Media Design faculty at the Bauhaus University Weimar. Since 2010, Rosefeldt has been a member of the Bayerische Akademie der Schönen Künste in the division of Film and Media Art. Since 2011, he has been professor at the Akademie der Bildenden Künste in Munich. Since 2013, he has also been serving on the board of trustees of the Kino der Kunst festival in Munich.

Rosefeldt's video installations include Manifesto (2015) where Cate Blanchett plays 13 roles performing various manifestos, and Euphoria (2022) with Giancarlo Esposito, Cate Blanchett and others.

== Exhibitions ==
Rosefeldt has exhibited internationally since 1997 at the São Paulo Art Biennial (2004), Athens Biennale (2007), the P.S.1 New York (1998), Kunst-Werke Berlin (2004), the Royal Academy of Arts London (2008), and the Kunstmuseum Bonn (2009), amongst others. Rosefeldt's first solo show in the United States was presented in 2009 by his ARNDT Berlin, in the space of Phillips de Pury & Company. His videos were seen in Montreal in 2018, in Washington at the Hirshhorn Museum and Sculpture Garden in 2019 and 2025 at C/O Berlin.

== Collections ==
Rosefeldt's works are represented in the following permanent collections, amongst others: Museum of Modern Art New York, Saatchi Gallery London, Goetz Collection, Munich, Kunstmuseum Bonn, Burger Collection Hong Kong, Cisneros Fontanals Art Foundation Miami, Museo de Arte Contemporaneo de Castilla y Leon, Sammlung Hoffmann Berlin, Thyssen-Bornemisza Art Contemporary Wien, CAC Malaga, Ellipse Foundation – Contemporary Art Collection, Cascais, Maison européenne de la photographie, Paris, Museum Franz Gertsch, Burg

== Bibliography ==
- Ingvild Goetz and Stephan Urbaschek, eds. fast forward 2: The Power of Motion. Exh. cat., ZKM Museum für Neue Kunst Karlsruhe, 2010. Ostfildern: Hatje Cantz, 2010, ISBN 978-3-7757-2604-7
- Julian Rosefeldt: Living in Oblivion. Exh. cat., Berlinische Galerie, Berlin, 2010. Bielefeld: Kerber Verlag, 2010, ISBN 978-3-86678-414-7
- Stephan Berg, et al., eds. Julian Rosefeldt: American Night. Exh. cat., EX3 Centro per l'Arte Contemporanea, 2009, and Kunstmuseum Bonn, 2010. Berlin: The Green Box Kunst Editionen, 2009, ISBN 978-3-941644-15-1
- Stephan Berg, et al. eds. Julian Rosefeldt: Film Works. Ostfildern: Hatje Cantz, 2008, ISBN 978-3-7757-2171-4
- Michael Rush. Video Art, revised 2. edition, London, 2007, ISBN 978-0-500-28487-2
- Made in Germany – Aktuelle Kunst aus Deutschland. Exh. cat., Kestnergesellschaft, Kunstverein Hannover and Sprengel Museum, Hannover, 2007. Ostfildern: Hatje Cantz, 2007, ISBN 978-3-7757-1985-8
- The Ship of Fools (Collector's Edition), Hatje Cantz, Ostfildern, 2007
- Mark Gisbourne. Kunststation Berlin. Munich, 2006, ISBN 978-3-89660-364-7
- BALTIC Centre for Contemporary Art, Gateshead, ed. Julian Rosefeldt: asylum. Exh. cat., Festival d'Avignon et al., 2004. Ostfildern-Ruit: Hatje Cantz, 2004, ISBN 3-7757-1512-6
- Julian Rosefeldt, ed., Global Soap. Exh. cat., Künstlerhaus Bethanien. Berlin, 2001, ISBN 3-00-008099-6
- Julian Rosefeldt, Piero Steinle and Iris Lauterbach, eds., Bürokratie und Kult. Das Parteizentrum der NSDAP am Königsplatz in München. Berlin / Munich: Deutscher Kunstverlag, 1995, ISBN 3-422-06164-9
- News: Eine Videoinstallation von Julian Rosefeldt und Piero Steinle. Exh. cat., Kunstsammlung Nordrhein-Westfalen, Düsseldorf, 1998. Heidelberg: Kehrer Verlag, 1998, ISBN 3-933257-02-6 / Kunstsammlung Nordrhein-Westfalen, Düsseldorf, 1998, ISBN 3-926154-36-5
- Julian Rosefeldt and Piero Steinle, eds. Paris – Les Cathédrales Inconnues – Espaces vides dans l'ombre de la ville. Exh. cat., Espace des Blancs Manteaux. Paris, 1997
- Julian Rosefeldt and Piero Steinle, eds., Detonation Deutschland – Sprengbilder einer Nation. Exh. cat., Orangerie. Munich, 1996
