= Christoph Krauss =

German cinematographer and director of photography

Christoph Krauss (born 1964 in Hof/Saale, West Germany) is a freelance cinematographer and director of photography for fictional movie and TV-productions, documentaries and art projects (film and video-installations).

== Life ==
Christoph Krauss learnt the craft of cinematography at Berlin's Technical College for Optics and Photo-Technics (SFOF) and started his professional career as a lighting technician. Then, he went on to become an assistant cameraman and camera operator later. Since 1995, he has had responsibility for cinematography on numerous productions in Germany and abroad. His filmography includes feature films, TV-series and documentaries as well as underwater photography, action film shoots and art projects.

In 1993, he helped set up the developmental video project "Theatre for Development" at the Bricks Township Center in Windhoek, Namibia. Later, he also taught at the Faculty of Media Design/Media Art at the Bauhaus University Weimar as part of a lectureship in 2010.

Christoph Krauss lives in Berlin, is a member of the German Film Academy as well as the European Film Academy and is represented by the agency "Players". With Manifesto he won the German Cinematography Award 2017 (Deutscher Kamerapreis 2017) in the category feature film and a nomination for the German Film Awards 2018 / Best Cinematography.

== Co-operation ==
Christoph Krauss has co-operated with the following directors (in alphabetical order):

Christian Alvart, Angeliki Antoniou, Kevin Bachar, Walter Bannert, Axel Barth, bauhouse, Jürgen Bretzinger, Roland Busch, Sibylle Dahrendorf, Nicole-Nadine Deppé, Simone Dobmeier, Max Färberböck, Matl Findel, Herwig Fischer, Gunter Friedrich, Holger Gimpel, Esther Gronenborn, Nana Grote, Tsui Hark, Raoul W. Heimrich, Oliver Hirschbiegel, Hermann Joha, Sebastian Ko, Heidi Kranz, Olaf Kreinsen, Torsten Künstler, Sylvie Lazzarini, Nicos Ligouris, Mathias Luther, M+M, Yingli Ma, Wojciech Marczewski, Uli Möller, Claudia Müller, Till Müller-Edenborn, Michael Muschner, Christian Niccoli, Marc Ottiker, Stefan Richter, Julian Rosefeldt, Sigi Rothemund, Christoph Rüter, Christoph Schnee, José van der Schoot, Wolfram Seipp, Monty Simons, Torsten Striegnitz, Charly Weller, Rolf Wellingerhof, Eric Will, Donnie Yen, Chen Yifei, Tom Zenker

== Projects ==
Fictional projects (selection):

- Tatort: Driving home for Christmas (TV-movie, 2023), director: Sebastian Ko, production: Bremedia Produktion / Radio Bremen
- Tatort: Trotzdem (TV-movie, 2023), director: Max Färberböck, production: Hager Moss Film / BR
- Polizeiruf 110: Cottbus Kopflos (TV-movie, D 2023), director: Christoph Schnee, production: Eikon Media / RBB
- Zielfahnder - Polarjagd (TV-movie, D 2022), director: Sebastian Ko, production: W&B Television / ARD
- Nächste Ausfahrt Glück (TV-movie, D 2022), director: Esther Gronenborn, production: Producers at Work / ZDF
- Strafe / Der Taucher (TV-movie, D 2021), director: Oliver Hirschbiegel, production: Moovie / TV NOW
- Das weiße Schweigen (feature film, 2021), director: Esther Gronenborn, production: Nordfilm / TV NOW
- Matze, Kebab und Sauerkraut (feature film, 2020), director: Christoph Schnee, production: CCC Cinema and Television / ZDF
- Die Heiland - Wir sind Anwalt (TV-serial, 6 episodes, 2020-2021), director: Christoph Schnee, production: Olga Film / ARD
- Der faule Engel (TV-movie, 2019), director: Christoph Schnee, production: Neue Schönhauser Filmproduktion / ZDF
- Dogs of Berlin (Netflix-serial, episodes 05-10, 2018), director: Christian Alvart, production: Syrreal Dogs / Netflix
- Steig. Nicht. Aus! (feature film, 2017), director: Christian Alvart, production: Syrreal Entertainment / Traumfabrik Babelsberg
- Manifesto (linear version of the film-installation with Cate Blanchett performing 13 characters, 2015/16, 94 min.), director: Julian Rosefeldt, production: Schiwago Film Berlin
- Die Rosenheim-Cops (TV-serial, 44 episodes, 2008–2017), directors: Walter Bannert, Herwig Fischer, Holger Gimpel, Tom Zenker, production: Bavaria Film / ZDF
- Hubert und Staller (TV-serial, 3 episodes, 2016), director: Holger Gimpel, production: Entertainment Factory / ARD
- Die Garmisch-Cops (TV-serial, 16 episodes, 2012–2013), directors: Walter Bannert, Holger Gimpel, production: Bavaria Film / ZDF
- Schloss Einstein (Kids-serial, 12 episodes, 2010-2011), director: Till Müller-Edenborn, production: Saxonia Media / KiKa
- Weißblaue Geschichten (TV-serial, 10 episodes, 2014 and 2010), directors: Walter Bannert, Gunter Friedrich, production: Bavaria Film / ZDF
- Tierärztin Dr. Mertens (TV-serial, 17 episodes, 2005–2009), directors: Mathias Luther, Heidi Kranz, production: Saxonia Media / ARD
- Die Kommissarin (TV-serial, 3 episodes, 2005), director: Charly Weller, production: Odeon TV / ARD
- Ein Fall für Zwei (TV-serial, 2 episodes, 2005–2006), director: Charly Weller, production: Odeon TV / ZDF
- Im Namen des Gesetzes (TV-serial, 25 episodes, 2001–2006), directors: Holger Gimpel, Mathias Luther, Charly Weller, Uli Möller, Axel Barth, Rolf Wellingerhof, production: Opal Film / RTL
- KRIMI.DE (TV-serial, 2 episodes, 2006), director: Mathias Luther, production: Kinderfilm / MDR / Kika
- Alarm für Cobra 11 (TV-serial, 7 episodes, 2001–2004), directors: Axel Barth, Raoul W. Heimrich, Holger Gimpel, production: Action Concept / RTL
- Alarm für Cobra 11 – Einsatz für Team 2 (TV-serial, 2 episodes, 2003), director: Sigi Rothemund, production: Action Concept / RTL
- Tsui Hark - E.F.A. Master Class 2001 (cinematography for the action-workshop under the direction of Tsui Hark), production: European Film Academy
- Codename: Puma (TV-serial, 2 episodes, 2000), director: Jürgen Bretzinger, Donnie Yen, production: Nostro Film / RTL
- Ways of seeing actors - directing actors (cinematography for the directors-workshop under the instruction of Wojciech Marczewski, 1999/2000), production: Master School Drehbuch / Focal
- Alle Zeit der Welt (feature film, 1997), director: Matl Findel, production: Schramm Film / ZDF
- Days of Miandi (feature film, China / Germany 1996), director: Yingli Ma, production: DFFB Berlin / Wanhai Co. Beijing

Documentary projects (selection):

- Unsere Herzen – Ein Klang (partially, D 2020-2021), director: Torsten Striegnitz and Simone Dobmeier, production: Gebrüder Beetz / Arte
- Fetisch Karl Marx (2018, 52 min.), director: Torsten Striegnitz and Simone Dobmeier, production: Medea Film / Arte
- Künstlerinnen - Katharina Grosse (2016, 45 min.), director: Claudia Müller, production: Phlox Film / Arte
- Knistern der Zeit (partially, Burkina Faso / Germany 2010-11, 106 min.), director: Sibylle Dahrendorf, production: Perfect Shot Films Berlin / ZDF / 3 Sat
- Klaus Kinski, Ich bin kein Schauspieler (2000, 45 min.), director: Christoph Rüter, production: Zero Film / WDR / Arte
- Mummies: Frozen in Time (German part, Germany / USA 1999, 52 min.), director: Kevin Bachar, production: Pangolin Pictures N.Y. / Learning Channel
- Nun geht die Nacht zu Ende (Kinomagazin: Max Färberböck, 1999), director: Nicos Ligouris, production: 3 Sat / WDR
- Escape to Shanghai (German part, Germany / USA / China 2000, 70 min.), director: Chen Yifei, production: Shanghai Yifei Culture Film
- Byebye - Hello (Germany / Hong Kong 1997, 65 min.), director: Yingli Ma, production: Hartmut Jahn Film / ZDF
- Feuerfluss (Germany / Croatia / Serbia / Bosnia-Herzegowina 1997, 50 min.), director: Sibylle Dahrendorf, production: Sibylle Dahrendorf Film
- Tänze der Nacht (German part, Germany / Egypt 1996, 60 min.), director: Angeliki Antoniou, production: Jost Hering Filmproduktion / SFB / 3 Sat
- Onder Broeders - Unter Brüdern (Germany / Netherlands 1996, 15 min.), director: José van der Schoot, production: Jost Hering Filmproduktion / Arte
- Der gute Mensch (1990, 60 min.), director: Wolfram Seipp, production: Seipp Filmproduktion / HFF Munich

Art projects (selection):

- Euphoria (Filminstallation, Germany / USA 2021-2022), director: Julian Rosefeldt
- Manifesto (13-channel-installation with Cate Blanchett performing 13 characters, 2015, 12x 10 min.), director: Julian Rosefeldt, production: Schiwago Film Berlin
- The creation / In the Land of Drought (single-screen-installation, 2015, 45 min.), director: Julian Rosefeldt, production: Julian Rosefeldt Filmproduktion / Ruhrtriennale
- Deep Gold (single-screen-installation, 2013–14, 18 min., b/w), part of the cadavre exquis Der Stachel des Skorpions, director: Julian Rosefeldt, production: Julian Rosefeldt Filmproduktion
- My home is a dark and cloud-hung land (4-channel-installation, 2011, 39 min.), director: Julian Rosefeldt, production: Julian Rosefeldt Filmproduktion
- American Night (5-channel-installation, Germany / Spain 2009, 42 min.), director: Julian Rosefeldt, production: Julian Rosefeldt Filmproduktion
- European Film Award (3-channel-live-Installation, 2009), director: bauhouse, production: European Film Academy
- The Shift (4-Channel-Installation, 2008, 22 min.), director: Julian Rosefeldt, production: Julian Rosefeldt Filmproduktion / Schaubühne Berlin
- Milk! (single-screen-installation, Germany / France 2007, 39 min.), director: Julian Rosefeldt, production: Julian Rosefeldt Filmproduktion / Temps d'Image / Arte
- Ship of Fools (4-channel-installation, 2007, 20 min.), director: Julian Rosefeldt, production: Julian Rosefeldt Filmproduktion / Arndt + Partner
- Lonely Planet (1-channel-installation, Germany / India 2006, 16 min.), director: Julian Rosefeldt, production: Julian Rosefeldt Filmproduktion / Goethe Institut
- Trilogy of failure, The Perfectionist (3-channel-installation, 2005, 25 min.), director: Julian Rosefeldt, production: Julian Rosefeldt Filmproduktion / Arndt + Partner
- Trilogy of failure, Stunned Man (2-channel-installation, 2004, 25 min.), director: Julian Rosefeldt, production: Julian Rosefeldt Filmproduktion / Arndt + Partner
- Trilogy of failure, Soundmaker (3-channel-installation, 2004, 35 min.), director: Julian Rosefeldt, production: Julian Rosefeldt Filmproduktion / Arndt + Partner
- La Mecanique (video-installation, 2003, 12 min.), directors: M+M, production: M+M
- Kunst-Stücke (2-channel-installation, 2001, 12 min.), director: Michael Muschner, production: Michael Muschner / Akademie der Künste Berlin
