= Emily Kusche =

German actress

Emily Kusche (born 15 January 2002 in Berlin) is a German actress.

Kusche grew up in Germany, in the Prenzlauer Berg neighborhood of Berlin. She was interested in acting from a young age and appeared in commercials. Her television debut came in 2011 in a small role, on the German children's show Löwenzahn (Dandelion). Her first major film role came in 2013, in Das Kleine Gespenst (The Little Ghost).

Kusche played a teen immigrant, named Jameelah, in the 2017 film Tigermilch. In 2018, she had a lead role in the German action film Don't. Get. Out! alongside Wotan Wilke Möhring, and also appeared in the 2019 movie The Perfect Secret. She played the lead role of Evelin Kern, in all three seasons of the 2020-24 German-Danish TV series Sløborn (The Island in English), which also starred Möhring. She also appears in the 2023 English-language film Retribution, which stars Liam Neeson.

== Filmography ==
- 2013: Das Kleine Gespenst (The Little Ghost)
- 2017: Tigermilch
- 2018: Don't. Get. Out!, Balloon
- 2019: Dogs of Berlin (Netflix series), The Perfect Secret, Der Kroatien-Krimi (TV series, one episode: "Der Mädchenmörder von Krac")
- 2020: Cortex
- 2020-24: Sløborn (The Island) [TV Series, 3 seasons]
- 2023: Doppelgänger, Retribution
