= Hannah Herzsprung =

German actress

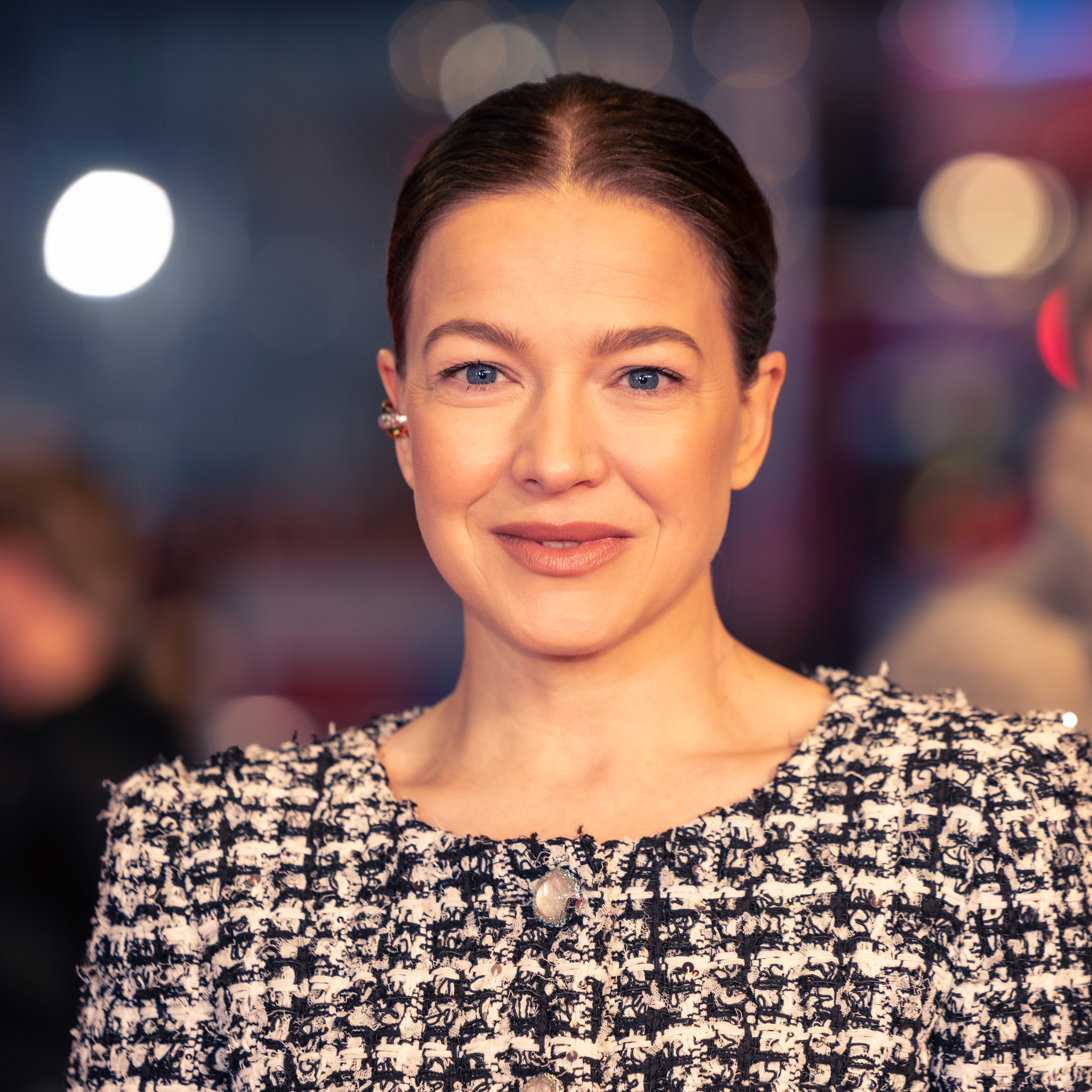
- Herzsprung in 2025
- Born: 7 September 1981 (age 44); Hamburg, West Germany
- Occupation: Actress
- Years active: 1997–present
- Parents: Bernd Herzsprung (father); Barbara Engel (mother)

Hannah Herzsprung (German: [ˈha.na ˈhɛʁt͡sˌʃpʁʊŋ]) is a German actress.

== Biography ==
Hannah Herzsprung is the daughter of actor Bernd Herzsprung and fashion designer Barbara Engel. She attended Hurtwood House boarding school in England until 1998.

She debuted as an actress in 1997 in the BR series Aus heiterem Himmel, where she played the role of Miriam "Mimi" Pauly at the beginning of the fourth and last season. She was taking private acting lessons since 1999. She took over the clip show on musicbox channel (now known as Tele 5) with her sister Sara at the end of 2002; at that time she also started studying Communication Sciences in Vienna. She had many television roles, including Jule in Das böse Mädchen, and since 2003 as Vera in the series 18 – Allein unter Mädchen. In 2003 she also had a part in Unter Verdacht: Beste Freunde and a smaller role in the comedy Tramitz & Friends.

Her roles became more ambitious with the television film Emilia – Die zweite Chance, where she played a patient with borderline personality disorder. In 2005, she received her first leading role as the murderer Jenny in Four Minutes by Chris Kraus. On 19 January 2007, she received the Bayerischen Filmpreis for best new female talent. In 2005, she played a suicidal youth in Life Actually by Alain Gsponer. She ended her studies in Vienna and moved to Berlin in order to act in these two films. For Life Actually she was awarded the 2007 Deutschen Filmpreis for best supporting role and the Adolf-Grimme-Preis in 2009.

In 2007, Herzsprung played terrorist Susanne Albrecht in The Baader Meinhof Complex as well as the leading role of Daniela in the film 10 Seconds. In 2008 she played the role of Julia in Stephen Daldry's film The Reader. She also played the role of Charlotte in Uwe Janson's adaptation of Goethe's novel The Sorrows of Young Werther, as well as in Jo Baier's television movie Liesl Karlstadt & Karl Valentin as young Liesl Karlstadt.

== Filmography ==
Film
Year	Title	Role	Notes
2006	Four Minutes	Jenny Von Loeben	
2006	Life Actually	Florina Krüger	
2008	1st of May: All Belongs to You	Ratte	
2008	Liesl Karlstadt & Karl Valentin	Liesl Karlstadt	
2008	The Baader Meinhof Complex	Susanne Albrecht	
2008	10 Seconds	Daniela	
2008	The Reader	Julia Berg	
2009	Pink	Pink	
2009	Vicky the Viking	Waschweib 1	
2009	Vision – From the Life of Hildegard von Bingen	Richardis von Stade	
2009	Lila, Lila	Marie	
2010	Habermann	Jana Habermann	
2010-2013	Weissensee	Julia Hausmann	12 episodes
2011	Hell	Marie	
2011-2013	H+: The Digital Series	Manta	13 episodes
2012	Wie zwischen Himmel und Erde	Johanna	
2012	Guardians	Helena	
2012	Ludwig II	Empress Elisabeth of Austria	
2013	The Taste of Apple Seeds	Iris	
2014	Die geliebten Schwestern	Caroline von Beulwitz	
2014	Who Am I	Marie	
2015	Traumfrauen	Leni Reimann	
2016	Rivals Forever: The Sneaker Battle	Friedl Dassler	TV film
2016	The Bloom of Yesterday	Hannah Blumen	
2017	Everything Is Wonderful	Lena's Sister	
2017-2020	Babylon Berlin	Helga Rath	21 episodes
2018	Don't. Get. Out!	Pia Zach	
2018	Mack the Knife: Brecht's Threepenny Film	Carola Neher / Polly	
2018	Dogs of Berlin	Trinity Sommer	7 episodes
2019	Sweethearts	Melanie Rossbach	
2019	Juntas no crime	Mel	
2021	My Son		
