= 10 Seconds (film) =

2008 film

- German poster
- German: 10 Sekunden
- Directed by: Nicolai Rohde
- Written by: Sönke Lars Neuwöhner; Sven S. Poser; Nicolai Rohde
- Produced by: Sigrid Hoerner; Anne Leppin
- Starring: Marie Bäumer; Sebastian Blomberg; Filip Peeters
- Cinematography: Hannes Hubach
- Edited by: Gergana Voigt
- Music by: Rainer Oleak
- Release date: 2 October 2008
- Running time: 98 minutes
- Country: Germany
- Language: German

10 Seconds (German: 10 Sekunden) is a 2008 German film.

== Plot ==
Four individuals are touched in different ways by a catastrophe. Markus is an air traffic controller who was directing a plane towards an arrival when it crashed into another plane, killing 83 people. Months after the fact, Markus blames himself for his role in the accident. Feeling alienated from Markus, his wife Franziska is finding comfort with another man. Erik is having a hard time because the death of his wife and kid in the accident. Harald is a police officer who was sent to the crash site, and the awful scenes have been etched into his mind.

== Cast ==
- Marie Bäumer as Franziska Hofer
- Sebastian Blomberg as Harald
- Filip Peeters as Erik
- Hannah Herzsprung as Daniela
