= Sløborn =

German television series

- Promotional poster
- Genre: Dystopian; Drama
- Created by: Christian Alvart
- Directed by: Christian Alvart, Adolfo Kolmerer
- Starring: Emily Kusche; Alexander Scheer; Adrian Grünewald; Lea van Acken; Wotan Wilke Möhring; Aaron Hilmer
- Composers: Christoph Schauer, Max Filges
- Country of origin: Germany
- Original language: German / Danish
- No. of seasons: 3
- No. of episodes: 20

Production
- Running time: 47–60 minutes

Original release
- Release: 23 July 2020 – 2 February 2024

Sløborn (titled The Island in English release) is an apocalyptic German-Danish television series produced by Syrreal Entertainment, ZDF, Tobis Film, and Nordisk Film. It consists of 3 seasons and 20 total episodes released between July 2020 and February 2024.

== Background ==
Christian Alvart was the primary creator of the series and its director. It aired for three seasons between 2020 and 2024. The series concerns a worldwide pandemic as it affects the residents of the fictional German island Sløborn located in the North Sea. The first season was filmed before the COVID-19 pandemic broke out, and debuted on the German ZDFneo channel in July 2020. The parallels of the storyline to actual worldwide events helped fuel popularity of the series.

The vast majority of the show is in German, but the first season especially has scenes where characters with Danish background such as the roles played by Roland Møller and Mads Hjulman converse in Danish. In the third season, two lesser characters speak English, and the main cast switch to English when addressing them.

The title of the show is a play on the English phrase "slow burn", for a story that takes time to develop, which is most apparent in the first season of the show as the teenagers and adults on the island deal with more ordinary challenges of life as the "Taubengrippe" (Pigeon flu) begins to change their world. The use of the "ø" in the title, a Scandinavian letter used in Danish, conveys that the fictional island is in a border area of Germany and Denmark.

Under the English title The Island, seasons 1 and 2 of the show have been released with English subtitles.

== Seasons ==
The first season (eight episodes) debuted on television in Germany on ZDFneo on July 23, 2020, when the first four episodes were aired, and the whole first season made available online on ZDF's website ZDFmediathek. In November 2020, ZDF announced that the series had been renewed for a second season, with shooting to being in February 2021. ZDF stated at the time that it had been the most successful streaming ZDFneo series to date. In English, the series debuted on the UK's Channel 4 streaming service on July 14, 2023.

The second season (six episodes) debuted online in Germany on January 7, 2022, and three episodes played on television on ZDFneo on January 11 and 12, 2022, and in two-episode offerings on ZDF starting on February 21, 2022.

The third season (six episodes) debuted online on February 2, 2024, and was broadcast in Germany on ZDFNeo during the night of February 2–3, 2024.

== Cast ==
The primary cast includes Emily Kusche, Alexander Scheer, Mads Hjulmand, Lea van Acken Karla Nina Diedrich, Adrian Grünewald, and Wotan Wilke Möhring.
