= Don't. Get. Out! =

2018 film

- Film Poster
- German: Steig. Nicht. Aus!
- Directed by: Christian Alvart
- Written by: Christian Avart
- Based on: Retribution by Alberto Marini
- Produced by: Christian Alvart; Siegfried Kamml; Timm Oberwelland
- Starring: Wotan Wilke Möhring; Hannah Herzsprung; Emily Kusche; Carlo Thoma; Christiane Paul
- Cinematography: Christoph Krauss
- Edited by: Marc Hofmeister; Theo Strittmatter
- Music by: Christoph Schauer
- Production companies: Syrreal Entertainment; Telepool; Traumfabrik Babelsberg; Zweites Deutsches Fernsehen; Studio Babelsberg
- Distributed by: NFP Marketing & Distribution
- Release date: 12 April 2018
- Running time: 109 minutes
- Country: Germany
- Language: German
- Budget: €2.5 million

Don't. Get. Out! (German: Steig. Nicht. Aus!) is a 2018 German action thriller film written, co-produced and directed by Christian Alvart. The film stars Wotan Wilke Möhring as a man who is contacted by a mysterious man demanding him to get an amount of money or he will blow up his car with him and his children inside. Don't. Get. Out! is a remake of the Spanish thriller Retribution (2015).

== Plot ==
Successful Berlin project developer Karl Brendt is driving his children Josefine and Marius to school when a stranger calls him and tells him that there are bombs under the car seats that will explode when they are released or remotely triggered. The caller demands a large ransom from both his private and business accounts and threatens to detonate the explosives otherwise. As soon as Karl or the children try to get out, the car will explode. When a second car also involved in the incident explodes when the passenger gets out, it becomes clear that the threat is real.

The money is in the account of Brendt's wife Simone. She initially refuses to hand it over and is only convinced of the seriousness of the situation when her young daughter asks her to do so over the phone. Simone's lawyer and lover drives her to the bank. He assumes that Karl is about to kidnap the children and alerts the police, who set off in pursuit with a large contingent and an explosives expert. The desperate father is now forced to flee from the police and save himself and his children from the blackmailer at the same time.

Karl's car is surrounded by the police at Gendarmenmarkt. Explosives expert Pia Zach discovers that there are indeed bombs attached to the car. In conversation with Karl, she has doubts as to whether he is actually traveling with criminal intent, while Inspector Drache, head of the operation, is convinced that he is dangerous. Marius can be taken out of the car. Josefine is also told to get out of the car, but she resists because she suspects that her father will be shot if he remains alone in the car. Instead of getting out of the car, she jumps into the passenger seat.

A supposed brother of Karl's is supposed to persuade Brendt to give up, but he is actually the blackmailer who wants revenge for the death of his wife. She has committed suicide after losing her apartment in a "rent eviction" for which Karl is responsible. He confirms the inspector's assessment that Karl is dangerous.

The blackmailer tells Karl that he has activated a timer and that Karl only has five minutes left to get the money. Karl then flees in his car. Zach learns from Karl's wife that the real brother is in Thailand. She takes charge, takes back the order to shoot and accompanies Karl's journey to the banks of the Spree with a large contingent of police cars. There, Josefine voluntarily gets out and the blackmailer gets into Karl's car instead.

The blackmailer makes it clear to Karl that he wants to take responsibility, and Karl now admits that he has acted irresponsibly in his building projects. As the blackmailer refuses to give up, Karl desperately drives the car into the Spree. He is able to leave the car before the explosion, while the blackmailer is killed. Some time later, after Karl has served a prison sentence, the family reconciles.

== Cast ==
- Wotan Wilke Möhring as Karl Brendt
- Hannah Herzsprung as Pia Zach
- Emily Kusche as Josefine Brendt
- Carlo Thoma as Marius Brendt
- Christiane Paul as Simone Brendt
- Marc Hosemann as Lukas
- Fahri Yardim as Omar Cicek

== Production ==
Don't. Get. Out! is a remake of the Spanish thriller Retribution. The film was shot for about 7 weeks between March 22 and May 6, 2017, in Berlin.

== Release ==
=== Reception ===
Sascha Westphal from the film magazine "epd Film" gave Don't. Get. Out! four out of five stars and wrote praising its cinematography and pace. Jaschar Marktanner writing for the website "film-rezensionen.de" praised Emily Kusche performance, but criticized the film's lack of consistency and originality. Bianka Piringer from the web portal "Kino-Zeit" also criticized the film for its inconsistencies and stated that despite its promising beginning the movie sinks in the mediocrity at the end.
