= Curiosity & the Cat =

- Film poster
- Directed by: Christian Alvart
- Written by: Christian Alvart
- Produced by: Domenico D'Ambrosio; Christian Schüchel
- Starring: Konstantin Graudus; Detlef Lutz; Andreas Erfurth; Nadeshda Brennicke
- Cinematography: Peter Przybylski
- Edited by: Philipp Stahl
- Music by: Michl Britsch; Wolfgang Thomas
- Production company: Syrreal Entertainment
- Release date: 21 January 1999 (Max Ophüls Festival)
- Running time: 80 minutes
- Country: Germany
- Language: German
- Budget: $45,000 (estimated)

Curiosity & the Cat is a 1999 German thriller crime drama film written and directed by Christian Alvart and starring Konstantin Graudus, Detlef Lutz, Andreas Erfurth, and Nadeshda Brennicke.

== Plot ==
A German writer gets curious about the violent and sado-masochistic ongoings in his neighbour's apartments and drills holes in the walls to gain more insight. He becomes consumed by his curiosity for their seemingly more interesting lives, simultaneously neglecting his relationship with his British girlfriend.

== Production ==
The film was shot in Berlin.

The tagline for the film was "Watch Your Neighbor".

Henri is seen washing himself several times in the movie usually by Christian Alvart's typical shot: He is reflected by three mirrors, effectively showing him four times from all angles.

Aphex Twin's song Come to Daddy is used twice in the film.

The legal disclaimer reads: "Die hier dargestellten Personen und Ereignisse beruhen allein auf den Auswüchsen eines kranken Geistes und sind so nie passiert. Alle Übereinstimmungen mit real Personen oder Geschehnissen sind zufällig und haben nix zu bedeuten." [The persons and events depicted here are solely based on the excesses/experiences of a sick mind and never have happened this way. All correspondences with real persons or events are coincidental and actually mean nothing]. And further: "Bei den Dreharbeiten zu diesem Film sind weder Tiere noch kleine Kinder zu Schaden gekommen." [Neither animals nor small children were harmed during the making of this film].

== Cast ==
- Konstantin Graudus as Henri Kappes
- Detlef Lutz as Kriminalhauptkommissar Gehler
- Andreas Erfurth as Kriminalkommissar Wosniak
- Nadeshda Brennicke as Paula (as Nadeshda Brennecke)
- Thomas D as Kurt
- Klaus Zmorek as Flagg
- Heribert Czerniak as Jelinsk
- Jarreth Merz as Hortek
- Domenico D'Ambrosio as Stritzl
- Sandra Leonhard as Roke
- Natascha Graf as Julie
- Ben Hecker as Dr. Bieser
- Clemens Gerhard as the assistant

== Release ==
The film premiered in Germany on 21 January 1999 at the Max Ophüls Festival and in Iceland on 11 November 2000.
