= Manifesto (2015 film) =

2015 film by Julian Rosefeldt

- Theatrical release poster
- Directed by: Julian Rosefeldt
- Written by: Julian Rosefeldt
- Produced by: Julian Rosefeldt
- Starring: Cate Blanchett
- Cinematography: Christoph Krauss
- Edited by: Bobby Good
- Production companies: Ruhrtriennale; Schiwago Film GmbH; National Gallery
- Distributed by: FilmRise
- Release dates: 9 December 2015 (ACMI); 10 February 2016 (Berlin); 23 January 2017 (Sundance)
- Running time: 130 minutes (exhibition); 94 minutes (feature)
- Countries: Australia; Germany
- Language: English

Manifesto is a 2015 multi-screen film installation written, produced and directed by Julian Rosefeldt. It features Cate Blanchett in 13 different roles performing various manifestos. The film was shot over 12 days in December 2014, in locations in and around Berlin.

Manifesto premiered in Australia at the Australian Centre for the Moving Image (ACMI) on 9 December 2015. The multi-screen installation was exhibited in Australia, Germany, the United States, and Canada from 2015 to 2019. A 94-minute feature version of the film premiered at the Sundance Film Festival in January 2017. It was theatrically released by FilmRise in select cities in the US from 10 May to 16 May 2017, and was made available for streaming on Amazon Prime Video that year. The project received generally positive reviews from critics.

== Plot ==
The film integrates various types of artist manifestos from different time periods with contemporary scenarios. Manifestos are depicted by 12 different characters (13 including the prologue voiceover), among them a school teacher, factory worker, choreographer, punk, newsreader, scientist, puppeteer, widow, and homeless man. The film consists of a 4-minute prologue and 12 main segments, each 10:30 minutes long. In each, a character recites parts of manifestos of various political and artistic movements.

No.	Character	Manifestos
1. Prologue	Burning fuse	Karl Marx / Friedrich Engels, Manifesto of the Communist Party (1848); Tristan Tzara, Dada Manifesto 1918 (1918); Philippe Soupault, Literature and the Rest (1920)
2. Situationism	Homeless man	Lucio Fontana, White Manifesto (1946); John Reed Club of New York, Draft Manifesto (1932); Constant Nieuwenhuys, Manifesto (1948); Alexander Rodchenko, Manifesto of Suprematists and Non-Objective Painters (1919); Guy Debord, Situationist Manifesto (1960)
3. Futurism	Broker	Filippo Tommaso Marinetti, The Foundation and Manifesto of Futurism (1909); Giacomo Balla / Umberto Boccioni / Carlo Carrà / Luigi Russolo / Gino Severini, Manifesto of the Futurist Painters (1910); Guillaume Apollinaire, The Futurist Antitradition (1913); Dziga Vertov, WE: Variant of a Manifesto (1922)
4. Stridentism / Creationism	Tattooed punk	Manuel Maples Arce, A Strident Prescription (1921); Vicente Huidobro, We Must Create (1922); Naum Gabo / Antoine Pevsner, The Realist Manifesto (1920)
5. Vorticism / Blue Rider / Abstract Expressionism	CEO at a private party	Wassily Kandinsky / Franz Marc, "Preface to the Blue Rider Almanac" (1912); Barnett Newman, The Sublime is Now (1948); Wyndham Lewis, Manifesto (1914)
6. Dadaism	Funeral speaker	Tristan Tzara, Dada Manifesto 1918 (1918); Tristan Tzara, Manifesto of Monsieur Aa the Antiphilosopher (1920); Francis Picabia, Dada Cannibalistic Manifesto (1920); Georges Ribemont-Dessaignes, The Pleasures of Dada (1920); Georges Ribemont-Dessaignes, To the Public (1920); Paul Éluard, Five Ways to Dada Shortage or two Words of Explanation (1920); Louis Aragon, Dada Manifesto (1920); Richard Huelsenbeck, First German Dada Manifesto (1918)
7. Fluxus / Merz / Performance	Choreographer	Yvonne Rainer, No Manifesto (1965); Emmett Williams, Philip Corner, John Cage, Dick Higgins, Allen Bukoff, Larry Miller, Eric Andersen, Tomas Schmit, Ben Vautier (1963–1978), George Maciunas, Fluxus Manifesto (1963); Mierle Laderman Ukeles, Maintenance Art Manifesto (1969); Kurt Schwitters, The Merz Stage (1919)
8. Surrealism / Spatialism	Puppeteer	André Breton, Manifesto of Surrealism (1924); André Breton, Second Manifesto of Surrealism (1929); Lucio Fontana, White Manifesto (1946)
9. Architecture	Worker in a garbage incineration plant	Bruno Taut, Down with Seriousism! (1920); Bruno Taut, Daybreak (1921); Antonio Sant'Elia, Manifesto of Futurist Architecture (1914); Coop Himmelb(l)au, Architecture Must Blaze (1980); Robert Venturi, Non-Straightforward Architecture: A Gentle Manifesto (1966)
10. Suprematism / Constructivism	Scientist	Naum Gabo / Antoine Pevsner, The Realistic Manifesto (1920); Kazimir Malevich, Suprematist Manifesto (1916); Olga Rozanova, Cubism, Futurism, Suprematism (1917); Alexander Rodchenko, Manifesto of Suprematists and Non-Objective Painters (1919)
11. Pop Art	Conservative mother with family	Claes Oldenburg, I am for an Art... (1961)
12. Conceptual Art / Minimalism	Newsreader and reporter	Sol LeWitt, Paragraphs on Conceptual Art (1967); Sol LeWitt, Sentences on Conceptual Art (1969); Sturtevant, Shifting Mental Structures (1999); Sturtevant, Man is Double Man is Copy Man is Clone (2004); Adrian Piper, Idea, Form, Context (1969)
13. Film / Epilogue	Teacher	Stan Brakhage, Metaphors on Vision (1963); Jim Jarmusch, Golden Rules of Filmmaking (2002); Lars von Trier / Thomas Vinterberg, Dogme 95 (1995); Werner Herzog, Minnesota Declaration (1999); Lebbeus Woods, Manifesto (1993) – Epilogue

== Production ==
=== Development ===
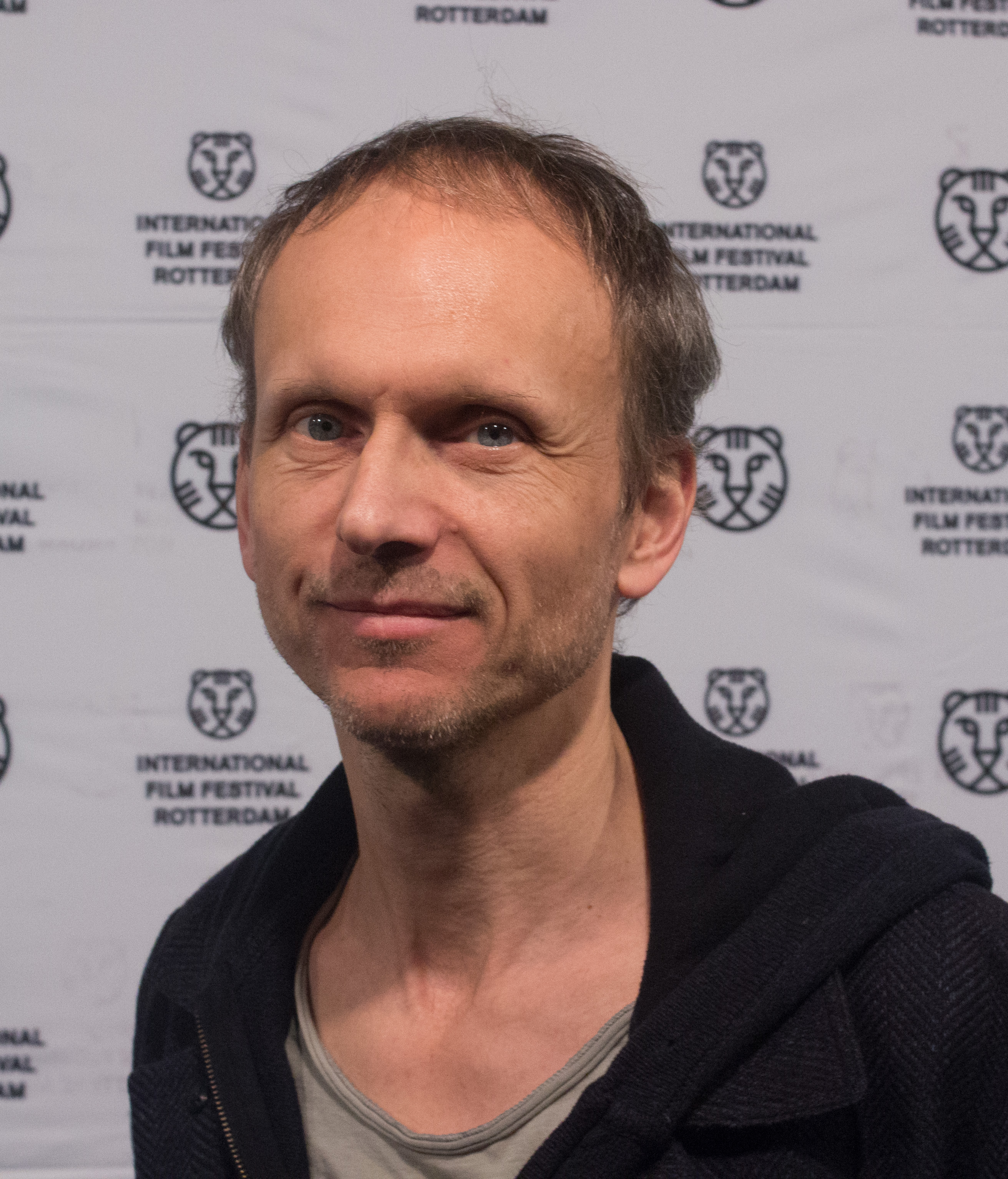
Director, writer and producer Julian Rosefeldt

Rosefeldt began developing the project by researching and analysing an assortment of textual manifestos. He selected approximately 60 manifestos that he considered "the most fascinating and most requitable" or he thought corresponded to one another. He cited the comments from Wassily Kandinsky and Franz Marc as complementing the thoughts of Barnett Newman, as well as a connection between the texts of André Breton and Lucio Fontana, and the writings of the Dada or Fluxus artists being potentially "combined into a kind of condensation, a kind of Super-Dada or Super-Fluxus Manifesto". After collating and fragmenting numerous texts, eventually 12 manifesto collages materialised.

Rosefeldt's main concept for the project was to have a woman embody the manifestos. He wanted to "make a piece in which a woman performed multiple roles" in an art-based framework.

In parallel, I began to sketch different scenes in which a woman talks, ending up with sixty short scenes, situations right across various educational levels and professional milieus. The only thing these draft scenes had in common was that they are being performed today, and that a woman is holding a monologue ... Sometimes we listen to the woman's inner voice; in other instances she addresses an audience; once she even interviews herself, etc. I finally edited everything down to twelve scenes and twelve corresponding text collages.

Rosefeldt and Blanchett met in 2014 in Berlin through director Thomas Ostermeier, who had collaborated with Rosefeldt in theatre. Rosefeldt discussed with Blanchett her role as Bob Dylan in Todd Haynes' film I'm Not There, which influenced the conception of the project. The two met several times to brainstorm and developed the project together. Blanchett said she was intrigued by the opportunity to perform multiple roles in a figurative context, noting that "on film, you're usually inviting an audience into a very literal narrative experience. So to allow an audience to free associate and find points of common reference is very exciting". She found the material "absurd" and provocative, and Rosefeldt added that the humour in the work "does help discover that some of these texts were not written with 100 percent total sincerity". Blanchett's husband Andrew Upton and their children performed in the Pop Art scene.

Rosefeldt described the process of scripting as "very organic". He edited, combined and rearranged texts into new texts "that could be spoken and performed". He was attracted to the idea of alluding to "a collection of voices, a conversation", and reframing those voices "into new monologues". According to the ACMI, the project "questions the role of the artist in society today", drawing on the writings of Futurists, Dadaists, Fluxus artists, Situationists and Dogme 95, and the "musings of individual artists, architects, dancers and filmmakers". Rosefeldt called it an "homage to the beauty of artists' manifestos − a manifesto of manifestos". He titled it Manifesto as the core of the project is the texts and their poetry.

Manifesto was commissioned by the ACMI, in partnership with the Art Gallery of New South Wales, Museum für Gegenwart, Sprengel Museum, and Ruhrtriennale Festival of the Arts. The film was subsidised by the Medienboard Berlin-Brandenburg with €90,000. It is a coproduction of the Ruhrtriennale, Schiwago Film GmbH, and the Berlin National Gallery, in cooperation with Bayerischer Rundfunk, the Burger Collection Hong Kong, and the Medienboard Berlin-Brandenburg.

=== Filming ===
Production on the film began on 9 December 2014, lasting 12 days. The conditions under which the crew and actress worked in the Berlin winter, including the very tight time frame, allowed little room for improvisation. The crew had to "plan the shoot meticulously" as sometimes they had to shoot two roles per day. Filming locations in Berlin included the Friedrichstadt-Palast, Helmholtz-Zentrum Berlin, Teufelsberg, Humboldt University of Berlin, and Technische Universität Berlin; in surrounding Brandenburg, filming was located in Rüdersdorf, Brandenburg University of Technology, and the Stahnsdorf South-Western Cemetery. A total 130 minutes of footage was shot. Rosefeldt framed Manifesto as "a series of episodes that can be seen separately but that can also be seen together in their entirety, as a choir of difference voices".

Cinematographer Christoph Krauss used the Alexa XT Plus digital camera as his A-camera. Visual effects (VFX) shots were captured in ArriRaw format. Non-VFX sequences shot with the Alexa XT Plus and the Alexa Plus B-camera were recorded in ProRes 4444. Krauss used an additional Phantom Flex camera for two high-speed shots. He said he chose Cooke S4 lenses for the shoot because he likes the "slightly softer skin tones they produce". Cooke S4 lenses were combined with two Angénieux Optimo Zooms, which were used for "longer focal lengths and flexible second unit shots". Krauss aimed for a natural look, noting that "as in almost all of [Rosefeldt's] works, there is enough abstraction through either deceleration in long takes and slow motion, or unnatural perspectives like high top-shots".

== Release ==
Images from the film were released in April 2015. Manifesto had its world premiere and was exhibited at ACMI from 9 December 2015 to 14 March 2016. The installation was shown in Berlin at the Museum für Gegenwart from 10 February to 6 November 2016, and at the Sprengel Museum in Hanover from 5 June 2016 to 29 January 2017. The Art Gallery of New South Wales in Sydney exhibited it from 28 May to 13 November 2016. The first showing in North America was from 7 December 2016 to 8 January 2017 at the Park Avenue Armory in New York City. The installation was also shown in Canada at the Musée d'art contemporain de Montréal from 20 November 2018 to 20 January 2019.

A 94-minute linear version of the film had its world premiere at the 2017 Sundance Film Festival on 23 January 2017. Shortly after, FilmRise acquired North American distribution rights. The film was released in New York on 10 May 2017, and in Los Angeles and other select cities on 26 May. It was made available for streaming on Amazon Prime Video later that year. The following year, a 90-minute linear version was screened on the German Bayerischer Rundfunk channel. In 2019, the film was displayed on 13 screens at Washington D.C.'s Hirshhorn Museum and Sculpture Garden, where it was part of a larger exhibition entitled "Manifesto: Art X Agency".

== Reception ==
Manifesto premiered to critical acclaim at the 2017 Sundance Film Festival. On the review aggregator website Rotten Tomatoes, 75% of 85 critics' reviews are positive, with an average rating of 6.7/10. The website's consensus reads: "Laugh-out-loud humor and Cate Blanchett's tour de force performance(s) make Manifesto worth watching, even if the subject matter is too esoteric for all but a few." Metacritic, which uses a weighted average, assigned the film a score of 72 out of 100, based on 21 critics, indicating "generally favorable" reviews.

Dan Rule of The Sydney Morning Herald said that the project is a "remarkable exploration of cultural and cinematic tropes and expectations, as well as the jarring, dislocating effect of context on content" and praised Blanchett's "sheer presence and acumen as an actor". Reviewing an exhibition of the multi-screen installation, Jane Howard of Daily Review wrote that Rosefeldt "plays with the tension of bringing distinct thinking together", and while "the screens at first seem to invite solo viewing", walking further into the room shifts their arrangements as Manifesto "increasingly leans into the sound-bleed and an unspoken stand-off between characters". Siobhan Calafiore of The Weekly Review deemed walking into Manifesto "like entering a strange world where you are both lost and found", and found a "beautiful unity" between the scenes.

Writing for The Guardian, Toby Fehily gave the installation four out of five stars, praising Blanchett's "convincing, almost effortless performances" and writing that the manifestos "lose their gravity and perhaps some of their meaning" in the gallery, but Rosefeldt "found a way to shrinkwrap the ambitious spirit and poetry of these texts into humble everyday actions". Joe McGovern of Entertainment Weekly called the film "operatic" and an "unexpectedly robust experience, with some segments that are hilariously droll". In The New Republic, Jo Livingstone praised its production, cinematography and absurd humour. The New York Times's Glenn Kenny described Manifesto as an "oblique examination and critique of political and art history and their various interactions over the 20th century", and considered its feature film form to be a "very elaborate intellectual exercise, immaculate in every technical detail" and "both witty and provocative".
