= Cut Off (2018 film) =

2018 German thriller film by Christian Alvart

- Theatrical release poster
- German: Abgeschnitten
- Directed by: Christian Alvart
- Written by: Christian Alvart
- Produced by: Christian Alvart; Siegfried Kamml; Hartmut Köhler; Barbara Thielen; Regina Ziegler
- Starring: Moritz Bleibtreu; Jasna Fritzi Bauer; Lars Eidinger; Fahri Yardım
- Cinematography: Jakub Bejnarowicz
- Edited by: Marc Hofmeister
- Music by: Maurus Ronner; Christoph Schauer
- Production companies: Ziegler Film; Syrreal Entertainment; Warner Bros. Film Productions Germany
- Distributed by: Warner Bros. Pictures
- Release date: 11 October 2018
- Running time: 132 minutes
- Country: Germany
- Language: German
- Box office: $1,058,455

Cut Off (German: Abgeschnitten) is a 2018 German thriller film directed by Christian Alvart. It is based on the eponymous novel written by Sebastian Fitzek and Michael Tsokos, a medical examiner. The film stars Moritz Bleibtreu, Jasna Fritzi Bauer, Lars Eidinger, and Fahri Yardim.

== Plot ==
A violent storm blusters around the island of Heligoland and cuts off the island from the rest of the world. Linda, a 24-year-old cartoonist, is temporarily staying on the island. She is threatened by her ex-boyfriend Danny, who is stalking her. Once again in a situation where she feels like she needs to flee from him, she falls down an embankment while fleeing and comes across a corpse on the beach.

At the same time, Prof. Dr. Paul Herzfeld, a medical examiner working for the Federal Criminal Police Office, is engaged in an autopsy at the Charité University Hospital in Berlin. He finds a capsule in the head of a female corpse whose jaw is missing. The capsule contains a small slip of paper with the cell phone number of his 17-year-old daughter Hannah, whom he rarely sees since separating from her mother. He calls the number and has to find out that his daughter has been kidnapped. He is told to wait for more information which he will get from a man called Erik. Mr. Herzfeld is advised not to call the police if he does not want to risk the life of his daughter.

While Linda is standing next to the corpse, the mobile phone of the dead man found on Heligoland rings. She answers the call and talks to Mr. Herzfeld. She explains that he cannot come to Heligoland because of the storm. He tells Linda to search for Ender Müller, who is a friend of his and the caretaker in the local hospital. The two of them should bring the corpse to the autopsy room. At the same time, Mr. Herzfeld and his new trainee Ingolf von Appen begin their journey to Cuxhaven in von Appen's car. The trainee became rich by selling his website which he had invented by the age of 14 but working in forensic medicine is not one of his strengths. During the ride, dr. Herzfeld urges Linda on the phone to examine the corpse she found on the beach. As he searches for his daughter, we seemingly witness the rape and torture of Hannah, who is goaded into suicide by Sadler, who leaves behind a noose.

Linda, who is disgusted and a vegetarian, only approves of an external necropsy, which she performs following Herzfeld's instructions, while Ender tries to lighten the mood with jokes. However, when she finds a yellow object in the corpse's throat and is asked to cut the throat open, she resists the request. Only after talking to Herzfeld about her ex-boyfriend Danny, she changes her mind. The object turns out to be the plastic capsule of a Kinder Surprise and contains a photograph depicting the retired judge Friedericke Töven who lives on Heligoland. According to Jens Marinek, she once passed a too lenient sentence on Sadler, who had raped Marinek's only daughter who was underaged and later committed suicide because of Sadler. Herzfeld and Marinek were colleagues and friends at that time. At the time, Marinek had urged Herzfeld to give a false testimony so that Sadler got a tougher punishment, though Herzfeld refused to.

Linda and Ender break into Töven's house in Heligoland and find a woman's corpse there, which they also bring to the autopsy room. Meanwhile, Herzfeld and his intern have reached the secluded house of his colleague, Jens Marinek. There, next to a dead pig, they find evidence relating to the sadist Jan Erik Salder, the man who is holding Hannah captive. During the search for clues, Ingolf falls into a frozen lake near the house, though he is saved by Herzfeld.

Ender wants to secure the electricity supply at the Heligoland clinic, and comes back to the autopsy room, in which Linda has locked herself, with a knife in his shoulder. A block of wood sticks out of Töven's rectum. Herzfeld has seen equivalent images in a video. There are numbers on the wooden block, which Linda forwards on via her phone. They are geo-coordinates which lead Herzfeld and his trainee into a forest. There, Herzfeld is overpowered by Marinek, who shoots himself after swallowing a memory chip. Herzfeld gets it out and sees a video on it showing the boss of a moving company Philipp Schwintowski. In it he explains his and Marinek's actions. Both Marinek's daughter Lily and Schwintowski's daughter Rebecca had been abducted by Sadler. In desperation, both girls had committed suicide after being raped by him. Marinek and Schwintowski decided to take justice into their own hands. They arranged for Hannah's abduction because in their eyes Herzfeld, as part of the justice system, was also responsible for the death of their daughters. In addition, they kidnapped Sadler, took his tongue, then let him loose on the judge, who Sadler killed. They then planned on killing him, setting him up as "Erik" and leading Herzfeld onto the mystery. Schwintowski then kills himself; Herzfeld not seeing the final seconds of the tape which shows Sadler apparently still alive.

In the forest, Herzfeld deliberately causes a car accident to alarm a rescue helicopter via the car's automatic emergency call system. The helicopter takes Ingolf and him to Heligoland. When he arrives, he saves Linda and Ender, who had been attacked by Sadler, which left Ender severely injured. Herzfeld recognizes that the dead person found on the beach was Schwintowski. Schwintowski had failed to kill Sadler, so Sadler set up his corpse in same manner in an effort to fake his death. The reference to Alcatraz leads the group to a bunker system under the Lighthouse of Heligoland, that the Nazis once built. There, Herzfeld finds Hannah watching a pre-recorded tape of Rebecca's rape, captivity, and ultimately, her suicide. Hannah was never raped nor was intended to be; her abduction being only a means by two grieving fathers for Herzfeld to feel their pain. Herzfeld takes his daughter out of the bunker, while Sadler is able to hide and escape unnoticed.

Before he flies back in a helicopter with Hannah and the corpses, the forensic doctor thanks Linda and Ingolf for their assistance. As the helicopter is flying over the North Sea, a knife cuts through one of the body bags. Sadler attacks the group before Herzfeld manages to push him out of the helicopter. Sadler is clinging on to the helicopter with his fingers. Herzfeld, after thinking of Lily and Rebecca, and knowing what could almost have befallen Hannah, cuts Sadler's fingers off with a knife, causing him to fall to his death.

== Cast ==
- Moritz Bleibtreu as Paul Herzfeld
- Jasna Fritzi Bauer as Linda
- Lars Eidinger as Jan Erik Sadler
- Fahri Yardim as Ender Müller
- Enno Hesse as Ingolf von Appen
- Christian Kuchenbuch as Philipp Schwintowski
- Urs Jucker as Jens Marinek
- Barbara Prakopenka as Hannah Herzfeld

== Production ==
=== Production notes ===
Cut Off is the third film adaptation of a novel written by Sebastian Fitzek. The first two were Das Kind and Das Joshua-Profil. Many of the scenes in the film were shot at the original location on Heligoland. Employees of the Paracelsus North Sea Clinic appeared as extras. Other scenes were shot in Berlin, for instance in an abandoned factory building in the Schöneweide district and in an auditorium of the Benjamin Franklin University Hospital.

Michael Tsokos participated as an advisor and many of his real colleagues were part of the movie. A pressmeeting for the movie took place at Tosko's workplace at the Berlin Charité. The forensic doctor described the showcase of the autopsy as realistic. He thinks it is possible that laypeople could do an autopsy under his instructions: "Any non-expert could do this under my instructions." The director Christian Alvart described the movie as "Sektionsthriller" (dissection thriller). It was important for him to slowly introduce the audience to the pictures of the autopsy: Das war natürlich extrem schwierig für ein visuelles Medium zu finden, was macht man, wie viel zeigt man, was ist nicht nur zumutbar, sondern wie gewöhnt man auch den Zuschauer, wie führt man in die Welt ein." (Of course, it was extremely difficult for a visual medium to find, what do you do, how much do you show, what is not only reasonable, but how do you also accustom the viewer, how do you introduce to the world.)

Tsokos and Fritzek have both cameo appearances as professor in a lecture and as lawyer of the forensic doctor. Tsokos' daughter Linnea plays the 5-year-old Rebecca. Christopher Kohn is the voice actor for Danny, Daniela Wüstner of Petra Herzfeld.

=== Publication ===
The movie was released on 11 October 2018 in Germany and on 14 March 2019 to a Russian audience. Abgeschnitten went on to be screened to an audience in the United States at the Cinequest Film & Creativity Festival in San Jose, California on 16 March 2019 as well as at the Cleveland International Film Festival on 5 April 2019. Large parts of the European public were introduced to the movie at the Brussels International Fantastic Film Festival in Belgium on 20 April 2019, the London FrightFest Film Festival on 23 August 2019 and at the L'Etrange Festival in France on 7 September 2019. While the German title of the movie is "Abgeschnitten", the international title is "Cut Off".

== Reception ==
Cut Off has often received critical acclaim following its screening to an international audience. Randy Myers of the San Jose Mercury News writes: ""Cut Off" is the equivalent of an absorbing if preposterous cinematic page-turner; you simply can't stop watching."

Kaspar Heinrich of Zeit online, a German newspaper, says: “the overloaded story is the pretext for this orgy of violence and autopsy [...] to last more than two hours. You really have to be hard-boiled to bear Cut off”. Heinrich speaks of an “outrageous story” and sees the film in the context of a generally bad reputation of German thrillers.

Phillip Schwarz, who works for the Spiegel Online magazine (a German newspaper), called the movie a "seltsam blutleerer Thriller" (strangely anemic thriller). "I[...]m Widerspruch zwischen dem romanhaften Prinzip der eskalierenden Theoriebildung und dem filmischen Prinzip der sinnlichen Intensität wird Alvarts Film zunehmend aufgerieben" (In [...] contradiction between the novelistic principle of escalating theorizing and the cinematic principle of sensual intensity, Alvart's film is increasingly worn down).

The critic Rüdiger Suchsland rated the movie for artechock and said that from a perspective of craft, much was done right. He also said that the story was very complicated, which is unnecessary. Suchsland then wrote that pretty much everything was blown, which is partly due to the template: A typical postmodern story that never aimed to depict reality. At the same time, the movie connects scenes that are very realistic, like the blunt presentation of an extremely brutal rape, with scenes that seem to be meant to be in a slapstick way. The critic continues his assessment saying that "Cut Off" had its special appeal and that it would be a thriller working with disgusting humor. There haven't been many films of this sort in German cinemas. Moritz Bleibtreu, Jasna Fritzi Bauer, Lars Eidinger and Fahri Yardim were praised as "brilliant actors".

Oliver Kube wrote an article for the newspaper “Bild” in which he claims that German horror movies tend to “go wrong”. Cut off is described as "tough Thriller", in which an "extremely dark" and intense atmosphere, which is usually only known from Hollywood movies such as Seven, is created by director Alvart. Besides the "star-ensemble", it is “especially the foggy autumn atmosphere” that characterizes the movie. To draw a conclusion, one could say that Cut Off is “a complex story, filled with absurd turns and an atmosphere that is usually only known from big-budget thrillers made in Hollywood. This top cast adaption of a bestseller leaves the viewers speechless and lets them shake from excitement.”

=== Awards ===
The movie was awarded the predicate “valuable” by the academy of German movie and Media valuation (FBW) in Wiesbaden.

Jasna Fritzi Bauer was nominated for the Jupiter Award in the category "best German actress".
