= About a Girl (2014 film) =

2014 film

- Film poster
- Directed by: Mark Monheim
- Written by: Mark Monheim Martin Rehbock
- Produced by: Martin Rehbock
- Starring: Jasna Fritzi Bauer: Charleen; Heike Makatsch: Sabine; Aurel Manthei: Jeff; Simon Schwarz: Volker; Dorothea Walda: Emmi; Sandro Lohmann: Linus; Amelie Plaas-Link: Isa; Nikolaus Frei: Dr. Frei; Heike Koslowski: Frau Richter
- Music by: Sebastian Pille
- Release date: 28 September 2014 (RIFF)
- Running time: 104 minutes
- Country: Germany
- Language: German

About a Girl is a 2014 German comedy film directed by Mark Monheim.

== Plot ==
Charleen is a 15 years old and obsessed with death. She exclusively listens to music by dead artists, collects photographs of roadkill animals and has an internship by the coroner. As a rebellious idea, she decides to kill herself and puts the hairdryer in her bathtub. Her suicide attempt fails because her best friend Isa calls. Charleen awakes in the hospital and is suddenly the center of attention, after she just wanted her peace. Her mother Sabine, her estranged father Jeff, her mothers new boyfriend Volker, her grandmother Emmi and her friend Isa, all ask her worried questions. On top of that Charlenn has to undergo therapy with the odd psychologist Dr. Frei and her family gets questioned by a woman from the youth welfare office.

At the therapist Charleen meets her classmate Linus. Slowly a friendship develops between them resulting in their first kiss. Suddenly Charleens new won courage gets tested: Linus backs down from her, she and Isa have a big fight and her beloved grandmother dies. These events show Charleen, that life is a gift that one should not throw away. She and Isa make up and she kisses Linus a second time.

== Production ==
The film was produced by Martin Rehbock and co-produced by Uli Aselmann and Bayerischer Rundfunk. The project received financial from FilmFernsehFonds Bayern, Filmförderungsanstalt and Deutscher Filmförderfonds. Shooting took place from July till August 2013 in Bamberg, Fürth and Munich.

The world premiere was in September 2014 at the Festival do Rio, followed by the Europe premiere in October at the Rome International Filmfestival. The movie was first shown in Germany at the 48th Hof International Film Festival.

The screening in German cinemas started on the 6th of August 2015. Since January 2016 the movie is available on DVD and Video-on-Demand.

== Background ==
The working title of the movie was Charleen macht Schluss (eng: Charleen ends things). The final title refers to About a Girl by Nirvana, because the protagonist Charleen is a big Kurt Cobain fan.

The movie is the cinema debut of Mark Monheim, who graduated from the University of Television and Film Munich. For his graduation shortfilm Mit sechzehn bin ich weg (eng: With sixteen I'll be gone) he won the First Steps Award in 2008.
