= Axolotl Overkill =

2017 German drama film

- Theatrical release poster
- Directed by: Helene Hegemann
- Screenplay by: Helene Hegemann
- Based on: Axolotl Overkill by Helene Hegemann
- Produced by: Hanneke van der Tas; Alain de la Mata
- Starring: Jasna Fritzi Bauer; Arly Jover; Mavie Hörbiger; Laura Tonke; Julius Feldmeier; Hans Löw; Christopher Roth; Bernhard Schütz
- Cinematography: Manu Dacosse
- Edited by: Bettina Böhler
- Production companies: Vandertastic; Constantin Film
- Distributed by: Constantin Film Verleih (Germany); FilmRise (U.S.)
- Release dates: 20 January 2017 (Sundance); 29 June 2017 (Germany)
- Running time: 94 minutes
- Country: Germany
- Language: German

Axolotl Overkill is a 2017 German drama film directed by Helene Hegemann, and stars Jasna Fritzi Bauer, Arly Jover, and Mavie Hörbiger. The screenplay by Hegemann is based on her 2010 debut novel Axolotl Roadkill. The film had its world premiere at the Sundance Film Festival on 20 January 2017 in the World Cinema Dramatic Competition section; where it was awarded the World Cinema Dramatic Special Jury Award for Cinematography.

== Plot ==
After the death of her mother, a sixteen-year-old girl (Mifti) becomes estranged from her self-absorbed father and controlling siblings. Lacking friends her own age, she keeps company with reckless adults. She falls in love with an older woman and white-collar criminal (Alice), with whom she enters into a sexual relationship; while finding friendship with an actress and drug addict (Ophelia). The two embark on a three-day binge through Berlin clubs.

== Cast ==
- Jasna Fritzi Bauer as Mifti
- Arly Jover as Alice
- Mavie Hörbiger as Ophelia
- Laura Tonke as Anika
- Julius Feldmeier as Edmond
- Hans Löw as Oli
- Christopher Roth as Georg
- Bernhard Schütz as Vater

== Production ==
=== Development ===
Axolotl Overkill was produced by Vandertastic and Constantin Film, with financial support from Medienboard Berlin-Brandenburg. The Match Factory handled international distribution rights (excluding Germany). North American rights were acquired by FilmRise on 14 February 2017.

== Release ==
The film held its international premiere at the Sundance Film Festival on 20 January 2017. It was released theatrically in Germany on 29 June 2017.
