= Arme Millionäre =

- Also known as: Poor Millionaires
- Starring: Sky du Mont
- Country of origin: Germany; Austria

Production
- Running time: approx. 43 minutes

Original release
- Network: RTL
- Release: August 22, 2005 – November 2, 2006

Arme Millionäre (German: Poor Millionaires) is an Austro-German comedy-drama television film series, first aired on RTL on 22 August 2005. 12 episodes were aired between then and 2006. The series is about a billionaire family who suddenly find themselves poor.

== See also ==
- List of German television series
