= Jasna Fritzi Bauer =

Swiss actress

- Jasna Fritzi Bauer at the 76th Berlin International Film Festival
- Born: 20 February 1989 (age 37); Wiesbaden, West Germany
- Occupation: Actress
- Years active: 2010-present

Jasna Fritzi Bauer (born 20 February 1989) is a German-born Swiss actress. She has appeared in more than fifteen films since 2010.

Since 2021 Bauer has starred as part of the Bremen team on the German television series Tatort.

She was in a relationship with the German writer Katharina Zorn until 2025.

== Selected filmography ==
Year	Title	Role	Notes
2011	Alive and Ticking	Eva	
2012	Barbara	Stella	
2014	About a Girl	Charleen	
2017	Axolotl Overkill	Mifti	
2018	Abgeschnitten	Linda	
2018	Jerks	Jasna	
2018	Dogs of Berlin	Nike	
since 2021	Tatort	Liv Moormann	
