= Christian Alvart =

German filmmaker and screenwriter

- Born: 28 May 1974 (age 52); Seeheim-Jugenheim, West Germany
- Occupations: Film director, screenwriter
- Years active: 1999–present

Christian Alvart (born 28 May 1974 in Jugenheim) is a German filmmaker.

== Career ==
Prior to working in the film business, Alvart worked in various positions, most recently as a senior editor at Filmmagzin X-TRO. In 1999, he made his debut as a film director with the thriller Curiosity & the Cat, for which he also wrote the screenplay. His next film was the thriller Antibodies. Alvart's first English-language film was Case 39, followed by Pandorum.

In March 2010, it was announced that Alvart secured the film rights for Captain Future and was working on a live-action adaptation in 3D. Alvart confirmed in a 2017 interview that he was still working on the project.

== Filmography ==
Film

| Year | Title | Director | Writer | Producer | Notes |
|---|---|---|---|---|---|
| 1999 | Curiosity & the Cat | Yes | Yes | Yes | |
| 2005 | Antibodies | Yes | Yes | Co-producer | |
| 2009 | Case 39 | Yes | No | No | |
| 2009 | Pandorum | Yes | Story | No | |
| 2010 | 8:28 AM | Yes | No | No | |
| 2013 | Banklady | Yes | No | No | Also editor |
| 2015 | Halbe Brüder | Yes | No | Yes | |
| 2016 | Tschiller: Off Duty | Yes | Yes | No | |
| 2018 | Don't. Get. Out! | Yes | Yes | Yes | |
| 2018 | Cut Off | Yes | Yes | Yes | |
| 2019 | Freies Land | Yes | Yes | Yes | Also cinematographer |

Television

| Year | Title | Director | Writer | Producer | Creator | DoP | Notes |
|---|---|---|---|---|---|---|---|
| 2011-2016 | Tatort | Yes | No | Yes | No | No | Directed 7 episodes |
| 2012 | Wolff - Kampf im Revier | Yes | No | No | No | No | TV movie |
| 2018 | Dogs of Berlin | Yes | Yes | Yes | Yes | No | All 10 episodes |
| 2020-2024 | The Island | Yes | Yes | Yes | Yes | Yes | Directed 16 episodes |
| 2022 | Ze Network | Yes | Yes | Yes | Yes | Yes | Directed all 8 episodes |
| 2024 | Oderbruch | Yes | Yes | Yes | No | No | Directed 4 episodes |
