= Iris Lauterbach =

German art historian

Iris Lauterbach is a German art historian with the Zentralinstitut für Kunstgeschichte. She is a specialist in the history of gardens in art and was a co-founder of the network for German orangeries, the international history of art network, and the German historical gardens circle for the art of gardens and landscape culture. She has been an honorary professor at the Technical University of Munich since 2012.

== Selected publications ==
- Karikaturen in England und Frankreich 1750-1850, Ausstellungsbeiheft Berlin. Staatliche Museen Preußischer Kulturbesitz, Kupferstichkabinett 1987.
- Der französische Garten am Ende des Ancien Régime. „Schöne Ordnung“ und „geschmackvolles Ebenmaß" Worms : Werner'sche 1987 (Grüne Reihe, 9)
- Bibliographie der vor 1750 Erschienenen Deutschen Gartenbücher. Alfons Uhl, Nördlingen, 2003. (With Clemens Alexander Wimmer)
- Antoine Watteau 1684-1721. Taschen, Cologne, 2008.
- Der Central Collecting Point in München. Kunstschutz, Restitution, Neubeginn. Munich & Berlin, Deutscher Kunstverlag, 2015.
- The Central Collecting Point in Munich. A New Beginning for the Restitution and Protection of Art. Getty Publications, Los Angeles, 2018. (Translated by Fiona Elliott) ISBN 9781606065822
