= Dogs of Berlin =

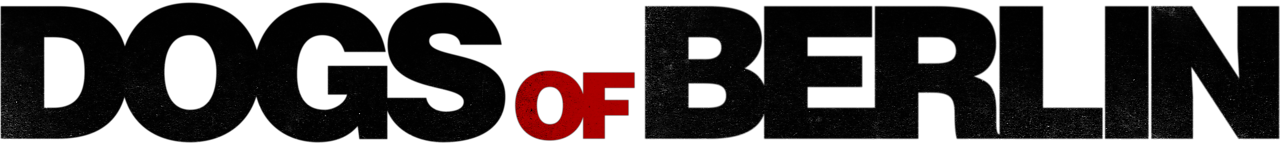
- Genre: Crime drama
- Created by: Christian Alvart
- Directed by: Christian Alvart
- Starring: Fahri Yardım; Felix Kramer
- Country of origin: Germany
- Original language: German
- No. of seasons: 1
- No. of episodes: 10

Production
- Producer: Sigi Kamml
- Camera setup: Single-camera
- Production company: Syrreal Entertainment

Original release
- Network: Netflix
- Release: 7 December 2018

Dogs of Berlin is a television series and the second German series produced for Netflix after Dark. First pictures of the ongoing production were shown in April 2018, after production started in November 2017.

The series was released on Netflix on December 7, 2018.

== Plot ==
Police officers Erol Birkan and Kurt Grimmer investigate the murder of the fictional Turkish-German football star Orkan Erdem. The murder sends Berlin into a frenzy, and the list of potential suspects is long: Neo-Nazis from the Marzahn borough of Berlin, the Arab Mafia from the same neighborhood as the footballer, Turks angry with the superstar playing for Germany instead of Turkey, football fans, and the Berlin Mafia. The chain of evidence may even lead to the highest offices of the capital. In order to uncover the truth, the two police officers have to venture deep down into the Berlin underworld.

== Cast ==
- Fahri Yardım as Erol Birkan, an ethnic Turkish German police officer who is transferred from his drug investigation to co-head the task force investigating the murder of a celebrity Turkish-German footballer
- Felix Kramer as Kurt Grimmer, a homicide detective who has a severe gambling problem that creates several work-related problems. He co-heads the task force alongside Birkan.
- Urs Rechn as Gert Seiler, Grimmer's immediate supervisor
- Katharina Schüttler as Paula Grimmer, Kurt's wife.
- Anna Maria Mühe as Sabine 'Bine' Ludar, as a Girlfriend of Kurt Grimmer
- Kais Setti as Kareem Tarik-Amir
- Mohammed Issa as Murad Issam, a young teenager
- Deniz Orta as Maïssa Issam
- Katrin Sass as Eva Grimmer, Kurt's deeply racist mother
- Sebastian Zimmler as Ulf Grimmer, head of a white nationalist gang
- Alina Stiegler as Petrović
- Hannah Herzsprung as Trinity Sommer
- Antonio Wannek as Hans Kuscha
- Mišel Matičević as Tomo Kovač
- Ivan Vrgoč as Stipe
- Jasna Fritzi Bauer as Nike Strack, an employee who beats and urinates on Paula after she is fired for stealing
- Constantin von Jascheroff as Robert Fucht, another homicide detective who is both suspicious and jealous of Grimmer
- Imad Mardnli as Wahid
- Branko Tomović as Dario
- Samy Abdel Fattah as Raif Tarik-Amir
- Giannina Erfany-Far as Kamila
- Sinan Farhangmehr as Hakim Tarik-Amir
- Sebastian Achilles as Guido Mack
- Hauke Diekamp as Wachtmeister
- Lena Schmidtke as Mandy Klink
- Langston Uibel as Raphael Bou'Penga
- Yasin El Harrouk as Fahd
- Robert Gallinowski as Johann Henkenmaier
- Renato Schuch as Murathan Canavar
- Paul Wollin as Gregor Munn
- Seyneb Saleh as Rafika Masaad
- Jan Bülow as Tom Kriftel
- Deniz Cooper as Aykut Kubat
- Eray Egilmez as Pusat Erdem
- Anne Müller as Gesine Kramer
- Yung Ngo as Karsten Nguyen
- Niels Bruno Schmidt as Bruno Przybylla
- Aram Tafreshian as Lars Niedermann
- Dora Zygouri as Emilia Grimmer
- Markus Boysen as Walther Laubach
- Werner Daehn as Hardy Kranz
- Tyron Ricketts as Leon Bou' Penga
- Leonas Sielaff as Thor Ludar
- Malte Thomsen as Eckard Meiser

== Episodes ==
=== Season 1 (2018) ===
No. overall	No. in season	Title	Directed by	Written by	Original release date
1	1	"V.I.P."	Christian Alvart	Christian Alvart	7 December 2018
Off duty Berlin police officer Kurt Grimmer is at his mistress, Bine's, apartment in the impoverished Marzahn borough when he notices police activity nearby. A murder has occurred, and Grimmer finds out the victim is Germany's top soccer player, Orkan Erdem. Tomorrow is the qualifying match for the soccer world cup, with Germany v. Turkey, and tensions are running high. Before revealing the victim's identity, he obtains permission to head the investigation and frantically borrows money to place a bet against Germany for the game, including from his neo-nazi brother Ulf. Bine successfully places the bet. Meanwhile, Erol Birkan, a German-Turkish police officer, is performing a sting against drug kingpin Hakim Tarik-Amir, but it fails when he finds out that Tarik-Amir knew they were coming. However, he makes contact with Murad, a teen-aged aspiring rapper who is trying to find success through Tarik-Amir. Birkan enlists him as an informant, and Murad's first assignment from Tarik-Amir is to monitor the bookie with whom Bine placed Grimmer's bet. At the end of the evening, Grimmer returns to his comfortable home and family, adopting a stray dog along the way. Birkan also returns home to his male partner.
2	2	"Mannschaft"	Christian Alvart	Christian Alvart & Ipek Zübert	7 December 2018
After the police commissioner finds out that Grimmer, who has neo-nazi ties, is leading the investigation into Erdem's death, she demands that a Turkish-German officer is put into the leadership of the task force. Grimmer's boss hopes that Erol Birkan can fill this role, but Birkan isn't interested. He is making progress with Murad and buys him and his sister tickets to the qualifying match. Meanwhile, the Grimmer's new dog coughs up Erdem's missing finger-- the dog was his. At the station, one witness claims that he saw four Arabs fleeing the murder scene in Erdem's distinctive Lamborghini. One of the investigators notes that Erdem might have not planned to play in the first place, but the German team could win without him. Panicked, Grimmer wants to guarantee the success of his bet, so he obtains an all-access pass for the stadium. Before the game starts, he bursts into the locker room and informs the German team that Erdem has been murdered, upsetting the players. At the same time, Grimmer's wife Paula fires a troubled employee, Nike, who beats her up. Paula retreats to the bathroom, forgetting her children at school. Grimmer's neo-nazi mother, Eva, secretly picks them up instead and takes them to her neo-nazi organization, the Marzahn Brotherhood's, clubhouse. When she finds them, Paula, enraged, tells Eva she never wants to see her again. Bine is also having difficulties. She misses an appointment for her social assistance, so it is fully cancelled. Desperate, she throws herself in front of her social worker's car.
3	3	"Begegnung"	Christian Alvart	Christian Alvart & Erol Yesilkaya	7 December 2018
Grimmer's plan works, and the German team plays a weak game. Halfway through, they're losing 0-1. In the VIP box, Hakim Tarik-Amir's little brother, Kareem, boasts that he has bought the German team, eager to establish relations with kingpin Tomo Kovac to usurp his brother. Even though he had only bought Erdem, his claims seem to be substantiated. In the second half, Rafael Bou'Penga, a young German player, takes to the field, evening the game. In the deciding penalty kick, he coincidentally misses, and Turkey wins the game. Kareem's claims are nevertheless substantiated by Turkey's win, and he secretly goes into business with Kovac. Because Grimmer owes Kovac money due to his gambling, he sets up Kovac for investigation in Erdem's murder. The supposed connection between Tarik-Amir, Kovac, and Erdem's murder convinces Birkan to finally enter Grimmer's task force. Later, Grimmer checks up on Bine, who is ok. He promises her help her, but warns her that Paula is his true love. After the game is finished, Birkan notices his estranged father in reveling Turkish-German crowds and goes to confront him, but is met by masked men, including Grimmer, who beat him up and warn him against joining the task force.
4	4	"Heimspiel"	Christian Alvart	Christian Alvart & Michael Proehl	7 December 2018
As Grimmer tries to get his winnings from the game to pay off Kovac, he finds that the bookie has been murdered. He tries to remove proof of his bet from the crime scene, but only succeeds in finding his own papers, not Bine's. A despondent Bou'Penga, holed up in a hotel, asks the team's "entertainment director", Lukas Schmaus, to set him up with an escort at an apartment. Bou'Penga travels to the apartment, but he cancels the escort. At the apartment, he finds his friend Qays, who is high and has removed the many security cameras in the apartment. Bou'Penga deduces that Schmaus has been gathering dirt on the players in the apartment through the cameras. Elsewhere, Kareem, who is in charge of security for the Tarik-Amir clan, is disgraced when a clan member has his jaw broken by a rival club's bouncer. To make up, he has the club shot up and the bouncer responsible thrown off a building. Desperate to cover his tracks, Grimmer has the bookie's murder transferred to his own task force. Birkan, who is recovering from his injuries and is on the task force anyway, is suspicious of Grimmer's activities. News of Erdem's murder goes public.
5	5	"Schiebung"	Christian Alvart	Christian Alvart & Henner Schulte-Holtey	7 December 2018
A brick is thrown into Grimmer's house, and Kovac threatens his family if Grimmer won't pay up. Kurt receives a call from Bine's son's school, where Bine's son has turned up in pajamas and barefoot. Grimmer finds Bine sleeping off a hangover, and tells her to get her act together. She dumps her alcohol into a sink. News of Erdem's death complicates Kareem's plans. When he finds out that Bou'Penga missed the penalty shot by chance and not because Kareem owned him, he scrambles to attain Bou'Penga's cooperation when Kovac asks for proof of their collaboration. In order to ensure this, Kareem blackmails him with illicit photos presumably attained via Schmaus. Meanwhile, Birkan is approached by a journalist who is onto Grimmer's past and offers him his contact. When Grimmer makes Murad falsely incriminate Kovac in the bookie's murder, prompting a raid on Kovac's betting houses, Grimmer is able to pocket money from the raid and pay off Kovac, but Birkan sees him. Paula is asked out by a member of the protection mafia, whom she initially declines. When she returns home, the Marzahn Brotherhood is waiting, threatening her because of Grimmer's debts. Meanwhile, Trinity Sommer, a fixer from the German Soccer Association, is onto Schmaus, disposing of incriminating material against players.
6	6	"Abseits"	Christian Alvart	Christian Alvart & Jan Cronauer	7 December 2018
Grimmer promises Ulf that he'll pay back the money to the Marzahn Brotherhood to avoid torture. Grimmer also publicly announces that the Kovac clan is not involved in Erdem's murder, after being bribed by the German Soccer Association to keep match-fixing out of the investigation. Grimmer's colleague picks up the bribe money, but is photographed. Meanwhile, a war starts between Kovac and Tarik-Amir due to Erdem's death. Tarik-Amir sends a hit squad to one of Kovac's betting houses, but a little girl is killed in the process. Grimmer and Birkan are both outraged, and Birkan wants to stop the war. Murad successfully performs at a club, but is told he's not "gangster enough" to become a gangsta rapper. Instead, his friend Raif, Tarik-Amir's cousin suggests they get money from Tarik-Amir to start their own record label. Bine's wealthy ex-husband comes to pick up the kids, and she is left alone. Jealous, she sneaks into Grimmer's house and injures herself escaping when Grimmer comes home. Birkan's dad refuses to reconcile with him, and Birkan's suspicion of Grimmer grows, even though his attempts at catching him are unsuccessful. As Paula is threatened by Nike's gang, the protection mafia member saves her, and they become enamored. Back at home, Grimmer won't tell his wife the truth about his troubles.
7	7	"Derby"	Christian Alvart	Christian Alvart & Ron Markus	7 December 2018
Grimmer's task force is humiliated by the press because of the lack of leads. Grimmer leaves a meeting of the task force discussing possible leads such as the location of the lamborghini because he needs to go to the Marzahn Brotherhood's punishment for his debts. He is beaten until his mother, Eva, arrives with her own money, claiming that it was Grimmer's and he was hiding it, which saves both her sons. The police arrive and Grimmer is relatively unharmed, but more questions arise due to his connections. Elsewhere, Birkan plans on entering the Tarik-Amir controlled no go zone for police, but is advised against it by his mentor, Canberk, who is already brokering a peace. In the no go zone, he sees Kamila, Hakim Tarik-Amir's fiance and Birkan's girlfriend before he came out as gay. They chat for a few minutes, and this interaction is photographed by Kareem. Bou'Penga struggles with his blackmail. Bine wakes up in the hospital with alcohol poisoning and is mistaken for a homeless woman, and plans to commit suicide. However, Eva appears and advises against suicide, and Bine acquiesces. Paula dances with Murathan, the man from the betting mafia, and a romantic relationship blooms. Pursuing Schmaus in Chile, Trinity Sommer subjects him to torture and he reveals that he was working for the German Soccer Association. Acting on a tip from a task force member who's leaving, Grimmer discovers Erdem's Lamborghini in the garage of the man who told him that four Arabs had sped away with it.
8	8	"Länderspiel"	Christian Alvart	Christian Alvart & Georg Hartmann	7 December 2018
Orkan Erdem's funeral begins, bringing together several rival factions. There, Tarik-Amir and Kovac trade threats, and a Muslim biker gang, the Death Daggers, shows up after rumors spread in the media that neo-nazis are responsible for Erdem's death. They prepare themselves for a battle with the Marzahn Brotherhood. Birkan gets a call and speeds to a murder scene: his mentor, Canberk, has been gruesomely tortured to death. Grimmer comforts him, saying that if they can connect Canberk's murder with Erdem's, the task force's resources can be dedicated to Canberk's murder. Grimmer manipulates Murad in order to again incriminate Kovac, orchestrating a raid but warning Kovac beforehand. Elsewhere, Raif sells Birkan out to Tarik-Amir so that he can get money to start Murad's label. Meanwhile, Grimmer refuses to divulge his discovery of the Lamborghini, but finds Erdem's real murderer: an elderly civilian. The Brotherhood and Death Daggers start a huge brawl over Erdem's murder. Back at Paula's, Nike comes back and asks for forgiveness, but Paula refuses and puts up a "Help Wanted" sign. Bine answers the inquiry.
9	9	"Verlängerung"	Christian Alvart	Christian Alvart	7 December 2018
The huge brawl eventually is stopped by the police, and the leader of the Brotherhood, wounded, escapes. Eva offers him her garage to recuperate, but secretly kills him, hoping to install her son, Ulf, as leader. Grimmer interrogates the elderly civilian who murdered Erdem, and finds out he was killed because Erdem's dog defecated on his lawn. He can't arrest him because of his backhanded tactics, but detains him. At the police headquarters, Birkan recognizes his colleague's cough from the night he was beaten. Birkan follows him to the murderer's apartment, where he is also detained by Grimmer. Grimmer sits him down with a proposition: they keep the murderer's identity secret and use the task force's resources to take down the clans. Birkan wants to report Grimmer instead, has no choice to do this: if he does the entire task force will collapse and his career will be ruined along with Grimmer's. Birkan disagrees with Grimmer's plans, so Grimmer gives him an hour to consider his answer. Birkan goes to check on Murad, but is chased by the hit squad, who he narrowly escapes. He agrees to Grimmer's plans. Meanwhile, it is revealed that Kamila has been sleeping with Kareem Tarik-Amir and they are collaborating to take Tarik down. The German Soccer Association admits to Trinity that Schmaus was their employee, he was gathering dirt on players to keep them in line.
10	10	"Siegerehrung"	Christian Alvart	Christian Alvart & Arend Remmers	7 December 2018
Raif goes to Tarik-Amir's safe room to gather the money he was promised for selling out Birkan, but is only given a fraction because Birkan survived. Birkan's raids on Tarik-Amir's warehouses turn up empty, Tarik-Amir knew-- but not because of a mole, but because the area is constantly surveilled by Tarik-Amir's watchdogs. The police commissioner is frustrated by the lack of progress on the case, and threatens to take Grimmer off the case if he doesn't find something out soon. At the same time, Kareem contacts him and threatens to release the betting slip unless Grimmer meets him. Grimmer shows up at an abandoned factory, where Kareem reveals his plans for takeover, and forces Grimmer to orchestrate a raid on Hakim's wedding in the no-go zone, where he will find Hakim's safe room and send Hakim to jail. This would enable Kareem to take over. It needs to happen today, or he'll release the slip. However, desperate for results for the commissioner, Grimmer plants Kareem's discarded baseball bat in Erdem's Lamborghini and takes it to police headquarters, presenting it as proof of Kareem Tarik-Amir's guilt and orchestrating an immediate raid on Hakim Tarik-Amir's wedding in the police no-go zone. Birkan reluctantly agrees. Soon after, a huge police force, including helicopters and armored vehicles, descends on the no-go zone, sparking a riot. In the commotion, Raif steals thousands of Euros from Tarik-Amir's safe room for Murad's record label. Hakim and his soldiers fire on the police and the police are attacked by rioting civilians. However, Hakim and Kareem are captured, and they will both be imprisoned. Enraged, Kareem says he'll release Grimmer's betting slip. Ulf is made leader of the Marzahn Brotherhood.
