= Sebastian Marka =

German film editor and film director

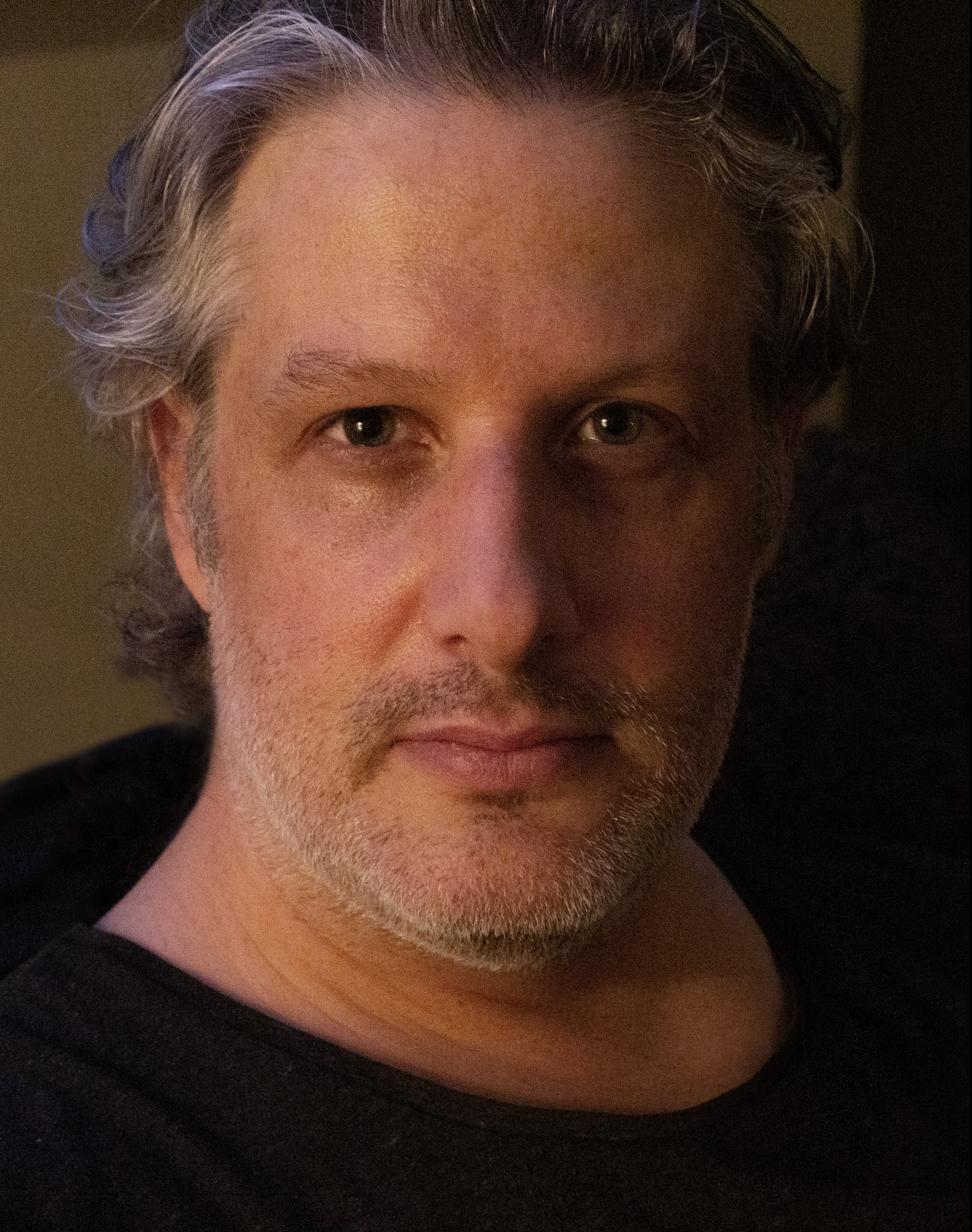
- Sebastian Marka, 2021
- Born: 1978 (age 47–48); Genf, Switzerland
- Occupations: Film director and editor
- Years active: 2001–present

Sebastian Marka (born 1978 in Geneva, Switzerland) is a German film director and editor.

== Life and work ==
Sebastian Marka was born in Geneva in 1978 and grew up in Königsbach-Stein near Karlsruhe. Marka began studying at the Filmakademie Baden-Württemberg in 2001 and graduated in 2005 with a degree in Film & Media.

While still a student, Marka began working as a film editor. He edited commercials, short- and feature films. After graduating, he continued his editing work and was responsible for editing several Television productions such as Unschuldig or 100 Code, an internationally co-produced Swedish crime drama series.

In 2010 Marka's short film - thriller Interview was released, for which he received many awards at German and international film festivals.

Due to the success of his short film Interview he received his first directing assignments. After directing five episodes of the German TV series Notruf Hafenkante, Marka subsequently shot ten 90-minute episodes of the popular German police crime drama series Tatort since 2013, three of which he edited himself.

The award-winning three Tatort-episodes Long Live Death (Tatort: Es lebe der Tod), Tatort: Die Wahrheit, Tatort: Meta, and four other episodes were created in collaboration with Erol Yesilkaya. He wrote the screenplays for all seven episodes. Marka had met Yesilkaya in 2012 and worked with him frequently until then.

In an interview with the German trade magazine Blickpunkt:Film, Marka compares their cooperation to the "showrunner principle". During the process of making a film, from idea development to film editing, Yesilkaya and Marka would be in constant exchange of information to achieve a good result.

On October 20, 2020, Marka's dystopian TV - Science fiction film Exit was broadcast on the nationwide German television channel Das Erste. Yesilkaya again wrote the screenplay for the film, which is set in the year 2047 and addresses the dimension and impact of artificial intelligence and digital life. The German film critic Arno Frank of Spiegel Online said, that a "perfectly formed dystopia like "Exit" [...] has not yet been seen on public television" in Germany. (Eine formvollendete Dystopie wie "Exit" [...] hat man bei den Öffentlich-Rechtlichen noch nicht gesehen.)

Marka and Yesilkaya also filmed the German fantasy novel The Gryphon (Der Greif, 1989) by Wolfgang Hohlbein as television series for Amazon Prime Video. Here, Marka was showrunner alongside Yesilkaya and directed four episodes. The Gryphon was released on Amazon Prime on May 25, 2023.

== Reception ==
The released Tatort-episodes by Marka were almost all praised by the German press and received good IMDb ratings.

For example, the German film critic Rainer Tittelbach wrote in October 2018, that Marka had created "exceptional crime films" (Ausnahmekrimis).

Spiegel Online - critic Christian Buß also wrote in a 2018 Tatort - review, that Marka had "repeatedly artfully widened the format of the series with cinematic 'Tatort-episodes' such as the Berlin episode 'Meta' or the 'Se7en' variation" for the Frankfurt Tatort edition (hat mit cineastischen "Tatorten" wie der Berliner Folge "Meta" oder der "Se7en"-Variation [...] immer wieder kunstvoll das Format der Reihe geweitet).

In addition, some of the Tatort - episodes won national and international awards. For example, the episode Long Live Death celebrated its international premiere at the Austin Film Festival in 2016. And Marka won an audience award for it at the Nashville Film Festival in 2017 and received a jury award at the Garden State Film Festival in 2017.

For the Tatort-episode Die Wahrheit Marka and screenwriter Erol Yesilkaya were nominated for the prestigious Grimme Award in 2017. They received the Grimme Award in 2019 for their Tatort-episode Meta.

== Selected Filmography ==
=== Director ===
- 2010: Interview (short film)
- 2015: Notruf Hafenkante (5 episodes from 2013 to 2015), (TV series)
- 2015: Tatort - Das Haus am Ende der Straße (TV series)
- 2015: Tatort - Hinter dem Spiegel (TV series)
- 2016: Tatort - Die Wahrheit (TV series)
- 2016: Long Live Death (Tatort - Es lebe der Tod), (TV series)
- 2016: Tatort - Die Wahrheit (TV series)
- 2017: Tatort - Der scheidende Schupo (TV series)
- 2017: Hit Mom: Murderous Christmas (Hit Mom: Mörderische Weihnachten), (TV movie)
- 2018: Tatort - Meta (TV series)
- 2018: Tatort - KI (TV series)
- 2019: Tatort - Ein Tag wie jeder andere (TV series)
- 2020: Tatort - Parasomnia (TV series)
- 2020: Exit (TV movie)
- 2021: Tatort - Pavlovs Köter (TV series)
- 2023: The Gryphon (TV series)

=== Editor ===
- 2003: Der Ärgermacher (feature film)
- 2006: Zores (TV movie)
- 2008: 1st of May: All Belongs to You (episode Uwe), (1. Mai – Helden bei der Arbeit)
- 2008: Unschuldig (4 episodes), (TV series)
- 2009: Killerjagd. Töte mich, wenn du kannst (TV movie)
- 2009: Parkour (feature film)
- 2010: Interview (short film)
- 2011: Schreie der Vergessenen (TV movie)
- 2015: 100 Code (3 episodes), (crime drama series)
- 2018: Tatort - Meta (TV series)
- 2018: Tatort - KI (TV series)
- 2019: Tatort - Ein Tag wie jeder andere (TV series)
- 2020: Exit (TV movie)
- 2026: Mutterliebe - A Mother's Love (short film)

=== Other ===
- 2023: The Gryphon (TV series), (creator, producer, showrunner)

== Awards and nominations ==
=== Interview (2010 film) ===
- 2010: Buenos Aires Rojo Sangre (Argentina) - Prize Mejor Director Cortometraje (Best Short Film - Director) in the category Sección De Cortometrajes (Short Film Section)
- 2010: Indie Fest (USA) - Award of Merit in the category short film
- 2010: Oaxaca FilmFest (Mexico) - Prize Best short film
- 2011: Celluloid Screams: Sheffield Horror Film Festival (England) - Prize Best Short Film
- 2011: FEC Festival (European Short Film Festival) (Spain) - Audience Award in the category European Competition
- 2011: Filmfestival Max Ophüls Preis (Germany) - Nomination for the Short Film Award
- 2011: Oldenburg International Film Festival (Germany) - Nomination for the German Independence Award – Bester Kurzfilm (German Independence Award – Best Short film)
- 2011: Seattle International Film Festival (USA) - Nomination for the Golden Space Needle Award in the category Best Short Film (Second runner up)
- 2012: Miami Short Film Festival (USA) - Prize Best Narrative
- 2012: Newport Beach Film Festival (USA) - Prize Best Narrative Short
- 2012: Pentedattilo Film Festival (Italy) - Prize Best Short in the category Thriller

=== Long Live Death (Tatort: Es lebe der Tod) ===
- 2016: Festival des deutschen Films (Germany) - Nomination for the Ludwigshafener Filmkunstpreis in the category Best German Film
- 2017: Garden State Film Festival - Festival Award in the category International Narrative Feature
- 2017: Nashville Film Festival - Audience award in the category Episodic Competition / Long Form

=== Tatort: Die Wahrheit ===
- 2017: Nomination for the Grimme-Preis (Grimme-Award) for Erol Yesilkaya (Screenplay) and Sebastian Marka (Director) in the category Fiction

=== Tatort: Meta ===
- 2019: Grimme-Preis (Grimme-Award) for Erol Yesilkaya (Screenplay) and Sebastian Marka (Director) in the category Outstanding Individual Achievement - Fiction
