= Erol Yesilkaya =

Turkish-German screenwriter (born 1976)

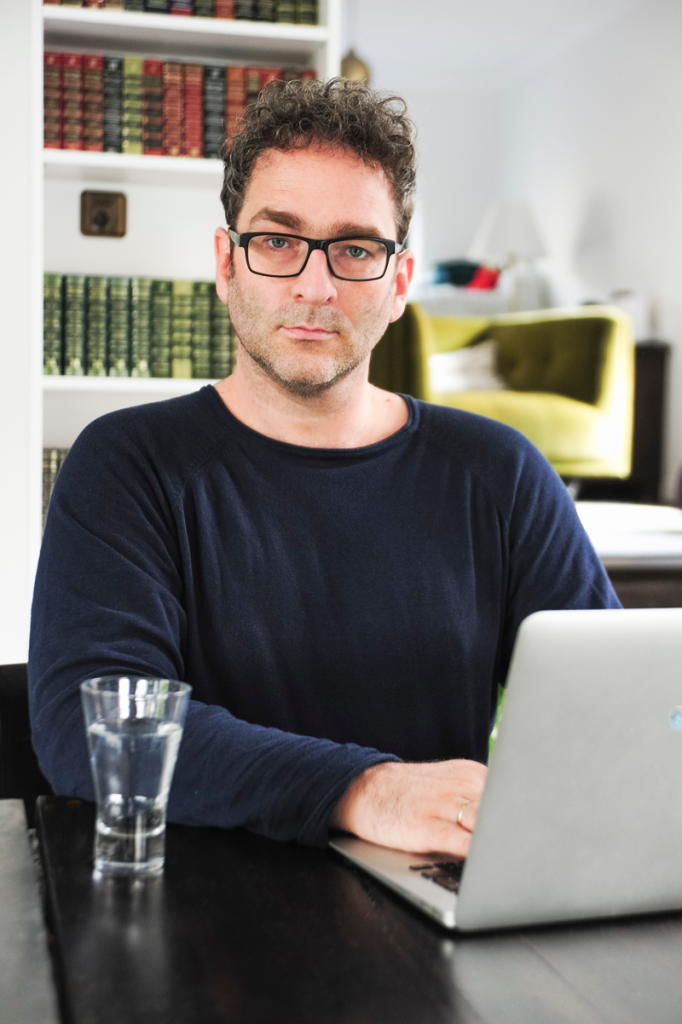
- Erol Yesilkaya, 2019
- Born: June 6, 1976 (age 50); Istanbul, Turkey
- Occupation: screenwriter
- Years active: 2008–present

Erol Yesilkaya (born June 6, 1976 in Istanbul) is a Turkish-German screenwriter.

== Life and work ==
Erol Yesilkaya was born in Istanbul, Turkey in 1976 and grew up in Krefeld, Germany. After he finished the Gymnasium and received his Abitur, Yesilkaya worked as a location manager. Then he studied Modern German Literature and Media Studies at the University of Marburg. During his studies, Yesilkaya was involved in many film and cultural projects as a promoter, organizer or projectionist and filmed various short film scripts, many of which were his own works.

After successfully completing his studies in Marburg in 2004, Yesilkaya moved to Hamburg, where he wrote his first screenplay. Since 2008 Yesilkaya lives and works in Berlin. There, he is part of a authors' collective named Schreibkombinat Kurt Klinke. As a member of the collective, Yesilkaya has written various episodes for police crime drama series such as Tatort among others. In addition, he has also written screenplays for popular drama and television series such as Dogs of Berlin, Sløborn, Hausen and Notruf Hafenkante.

In 2012 Yesilkaya and the German director Sebastian Marka had met and worked together frequently until then. The award-winning three Tatort-episodes Long Live Death (Tatort: Es lebe der Tod), Tatort: Die Wahrheit, Tatort: Meta and four other episodes were created in collaboration with Marka. Yesilkaya wrote the screenplays for all seven episodes.

In an interview with the German trade magazine Blickpunkt:Film, Marka compares their cooperation to the "showrunner - principle". During the process of making a film, from idea development to film editing, Yesilkaya and Marka would be in constant exchange of information to achieve a good result.

On October 20, 2020, the dystopian TV - Science fiction film Exit was broadcast on the nationwide German television channel Das Erste. For the film, Yesilkaya wrote the script and Marka directed again. It is set in the year 2047 and addresses the dimension and impact of artificial intelligence and digital life. The German film critic Arno Frank of Spiegel Online said, that a "perfectly formed dystopia like "Exit" [...] has not yet been seen on public television" in Germany. (Eine formvollendete Dystopie wie "Exit" [...] hat man bei den Öffentlich-Rechtlichen noch nicht gesehen.)

Yesilkaya and Marka also filmed the German fantasy novel The Gryphon (Der Greif, 1989) by Wolfgang Hohlbein as television series for Amazon Prime Video. Here, Yesilkaya was showrunner alongside Marka and responsible for the scripts. The Gryphon was released on Amazon Prime on May 25, 2023.

== Reception ==
The Tatort-episodes, which were made in collaboration with director Sebastian Marka were almost all praised by the German press and received good IMDb ratings.

In addition, some of the crime scene episodes for which Yesilkaya wrote the scripts won German and international awards. For example, the Tatort-episodes Die Wahrheit and Long Live Death (Es lebe der Tod) were nominated for the German Television Crime Award in 2017 and the episode Das Nest in 2020. The Tatort-episode Long Live Death had its international premiere at the Austin Film Festival in 2016, where Yesilkaya was nominated for an audience award.

Then, Yesilkaya and Marka were nominated for the prestigious German Grimme Award (Grimme-Preis) in 2017 for their Tatort-episode Die Wahrheit. They received it two years later for their Tatort-episode Meta.

== Selected Filmography ==
=== Screenwriter ===
- 2008: Gonger (TV movie)
- 2010: Gonger II (TV movie)
- 2012: Die 13. Wahrheit - Uwe Ochsenknecht erzählt (TV series)
- 2014: Tatort - Alle meine Jungs (TV series)
- 2015: Tatort - Das Haus am Ende der Straße (TV series)
- 2015: Tatort - Hinter dem Spiegel (TV series)
- 2016: Tatort - Die Wahrheit (TV series)
- 2016: Long Live Death (Tatort - Es lebe der Tod), (TV series)
- 2016: Tatort - Die Wahrheit (TV series)
- 2017: Tatort - Der Tod ist unser ganzes Leben (TV series)
- 2018: Tatort - Meta (TV series)
- 2018: Dogs of Berlin (episode Begegnung), (drama series)
- 2018: Tatort - Wer jetzt allein ist (TV series)
- 2019: Notruf Hafenkante (6 episodes from 2015 to 2019), (TV series)
- 2019: Tatort - Ein Tag wie jeder andere (TV series)
- 2019: Tatort - Das Nest (TV series)
- 2020: Hausen (episodes Juris Reise and Hausregeln), (TV series)
- 2020: Tatort - Parasomnia (TV series)
- 2020: Exit (TV movie)
- 2022: Souls (TV series)
- 2022: Tatort - Das Opfer (TV series)
- 2023: The Gryphon (TV series)
- 2025: Tatort - Dunkelheit (TV series)

=== Other ===
- 2023: The Gryphon (TV series), (creator, producer, showrunner)

== Awards and nominations ==
Austin Film Festival 2016

- Nomination for the Audience award in the category Stories from Abroad for Long Live Death

Grimme-Preis 2017

- Nomination for the Grimme-Preis together with Sebastian Marka (director) in the category Fiction for Tatort: Die Wahrheit

Grimme-Preis 2019

- Grimme-Preis (Grimme-Award) for Erol Yesilkaya (screenplay) und Sebastian Marka (director) in the category Outstanding Individual Achievement - Fiction for the Tatort: Meta

Canneseries 2022

- Prize Best Screenplay for Erol Yesilkaya (screenplay), Alex Eslam (Creator), Lisa van Brakel (screenplay) and Senad Halilbasic (screenplay) for Souls
