= Buenos Aires Rojo Sangre =

International film festival in Argentina

- Location: Buenos Aires, Argentina
- Founded: 2000; 26 years ago
- Website: rojosangre.quintadimension.com

Buenos Aires Rojo Sangre (BARS) is an international film festival devoted to the genres of science fiction, horror and fantasy. It began in 2000 with a focus on independent films in those genres, and since 2004 in the form of a competitive festival. Buenos Aires Rojo Sangre is well attended with over 200 films shown and 12,000 public and industry admissions each year. BARS is declared of national interest by the National Institute of Cinema and Audiovisual Arts, sponsored by the Film Museum of the City of Buenos Aires and declared of cultural interest by the legislature of the autonomous city of Buenos Aires.

== Editions ==
Since edition nr5, the festival has given out awards to short and feature films.

=== BARS 2004 ===
INTERNATIONAL FEATURE SECTION

- Best Feature Film: The Last Horror Movie (UK) by Julian Richards.
- Best Feature Director: Greg Pak for Robot Stories (USA).
- Best Feature Screenplay: Greg Pak for Robot Stories (USA).
- Best Actor in a Feature Film: Kevin Howarth for The Last Horror Movie.
- Best Actress in a Feature Film: Elena Siritto for Habitaciones para turistas (Argentina).
- Audience Award: Habitaciones para turistas (Argentina) by Adrián García Bogliano.

SHORT FILM SECTION

- Best Short Film: Redrat, la rata retobada by Guillermo Kloetzer (Uruguay)
- Best Short Film Director: Daniel Greaves for Little Things (UK)
- Audience Award for Best Short Film: Gorgonas by Salvador Sanz (Argentina)

=== BARS 2005 ===
INTERNATIONAL FEATURE SECTION

- Best Feature Film: Beneath the Cogon (Philippines) by Rico Maria Ilarde.
- Best Feature Director: Jeniffer Kroot for Sirens of the 23rd Century (USA).
- Best Feature Screenplay: Bill Marks, Sean K Robb for Zombie King and the legion of Doom (Canada).
- Best Actor in a Feature Film: David Muyllaert for Dead Meat (Ireland).
- Best Actress in a Feature Film: Paula Guía for De noche van a tu cuarto (Argentina).
- Audience Award: De noche van a tu cuarto (Argentina) by Sebastián de Caro.

NATIONAL FEATURE SECTION

- Best Argentinian Feature Film: Grité una Noche by Adrián García Bogliano.

SHORT FILM SECTION

- Best Short Film: Retruc by Francesc Talavera (Spain)
- Best Short Film Director: John Dunstan, Michael Pazt for Battle Chess (UK)
- Audience Award for Best Short Film: Alex, Vampire Slayer by Al Katrina (Canada)
- Best Argentinian Fantasy Short: Después de Recién by Ignacio Laxalde and Bernardo Francese.

=== BARS 2006 ===
INTERNATIONAL FEATURE SECTION

- Best Feature Film: Mondo Psycho (Argentina) by Mad Crampi.
- Best Feature Director: Marcus Widegren for Kraftverk 3714 (Sweden).
- Best Feature Screenplay: Ramiro and Adrián García Bogliano for 36 pasos (Argentina).
- Best Actor in a Feature Film: Emil Jonsson for Kraftverk 3714 (Sweden).
- Best Actress in a Feature Film: Mapi Romero for Belcebú (Spain).
- Audience Award: Song of the Dead (USA) by Chip Gubera.
- Best Special Effects: Martin Frías, Iru Landucci for 36 pasos (Argentina).

SHORT FILM SECTION

- Best Short Film: El cojonudo by Fede Álvarez (Uruguay)
- Best Short Film Director: Sacha Whitehouse for The City Eats its Weak (Australia)
- Audience Award for Best Short Film: El cojonudo by Fede Álvarez (Uruguay)
- Best Argentinian Fantasy Short: Asterión by Juan Carlos Camardella.

SPECIAL MENTION

- Special Mention of the Jury: cortometraje Griscelda (decromante) by Gabriel Grieco (Argentina)

=== BARS 2007 ===
INTERNATIONAL FEATURE SECTION

- Best Film: On Evil Grounds (Auf Bösem Boden) (Austria)
- Best Director: Peter Koller for On Evil Grounds
- Best Screenplay: Demián Rugna for The Last Gateway (Argentina)
- Best Actress: Victoria Maurette for Left for Dead (USA/ Argentina)

NATIONAL FEATURE SECTION

- Best Film: Massacre Marcial IVX by Pablo Marini and Matias Lojo

SHORT FILM SECTION

- Best Short Film: Droomtijd (Dreamtime) by Tom Van Avermaet (Belgium)
- Best Director: Gabe Ibañez for Máquina (Spain)
- Best National Short: Naturaleza Muerta by Romina Caramagna

AUDIENCE AWARD

- Best Feature: Filmatrón by Pablo Parés.
- Best Short: Sucesión by Pablo Baltera

=== BARS 2008 ===
INTERNATIONAL FEATURE SECTION

- Best Film: Tokyo Gore Police (Tôkyô zankoku keisatsu) by Yoshihiro Nishimura
- Audience Award: Mud Zombies (Mangue Negro) by Rodrigo Aragao
- Best Latin American Film: Nadie Inquietó Mas by Gustavo Leonel Mendoza
- Best Director: Bill Plympton for Idiots & Angels
- Best Screenplay: The Man from Earth
- Best FX: Yoshihiro Nishimura for Tokyo Gore Police
- Best Actor: Chris Sharp for Murder Party
- Best Actress: Josefina Sanz for Nocturnos

SPECIAL MENTION

- Producer: Paco Limón for Doctor Infierno
- Art Direction: Tokyo Gore Police

SHORT FILM SECTION

- Best Short Film: ELA in Love at First Byte by Fernando Sarmiento
- Audience Award: Maldito Sean 1º episodio by Demián Rugna
- Best National Short Film: Aquellos Ojos Brujos by Cesar Leonardo Delgado Brog
- Best Director: Alfons Casal, Hector Mas for El Comte Yácula

SPECIAL MENTION

- Best Comedy: División Bahia by Laura Casabé
- Best Animation: Piscis by Juan Camardella
- Best Production Design: The Container by Diego Melo.

=== BARS 2009 ===
INTERNATIONAL FEATURE SECTION

- Best Film: Masacre esta noche
- Audience Award: Recortadas
- Audience Award for Latin American Film: Operación Cannabis
- Best Director Marc Price por Colin
- Best Screenplay: Demian Rugna por They want my eyes
- Best Actor: Diego Cremonese por Masacre esta noche
- Best Actress: Mariana Zanette por Morgue Story
- Best FX: Yesterday

MENTION

- Special Mention by the Jury "Revelación Femenina": Noelia Antunez and Mariana Levy for Recortadas
- Special Mention by the Jury "Revelación Masculina": Jorge Pinarelo for Masacre esta noche
- Special Mention by the Jury for Scream Queen: Natacha Mendez for Masacre esta noche
- Special Mention by the Jury for Post Production: Ataque de pánico!
- Special Mention by the Jury for Screenplay: La menace vient de l´espace
- Special Mention by the Jury for Adaptation: The Raven

SHORT FILM SECTION

- Best Short Film: Die Schneider Krankheit
- Best Argentinian Short: La extravagante and poco práctica venganza de la momia
- Best Short Film Director: María Luara Casabé for Sabrosura, Violín y Perico
- Audience Award Best Short Film: La villa seca
- Best Zombie Short: Evacuación

=== BARS 2010 ===
INTERNATIONAL FEATURE SECTION

- Best Film: The Life and Death of a Porno Gang
- Audience Award Best Feature: Nunca mas asistas an este tipo de fiestas
- Best Director: Faye Jackson for Strigoi
- Best Actor: (ex aequo) Andrew Howard for Pig and Nicanor Loreti for Nunca mas asistas an este tipo de fiestas
- Best Actress: Roxana Guttman for Strigoi
- Best Screenplay: Mladen Djodjevic for The Life and Death of a Porno Gang
- Best Special Effects: Tomoo Haraguchi for Death Kappa

SPECIAL MENTION

- Special Mention by the Jury to MyM Matilde and Malena for "su busqueda formal, visual y narrativa"
- Special mention to Molina's Ferozz for the originality of una propuesta extrema
- Best Latin American Film (by popular vote): Trash

SHORT FILM SECTION

- Best Short Film: Cabine of the Dead
- Best Short Film Director: Sebastian Marka por Interview
- Best Argentinian Short Film: La vuelta del malón

SPECIAL MENTION

- Special Mention by the Jury to Copia A for its production and technical development
- Special Mention by the Jury to Working Day for his photography and esthetic language
- Special Mention by the Jury to Zombie Burguer Attack for the originality of your script
- Audience Award Short Film: Umiko.

=== BARS 2011 ===
INTERNATIONAL FEATURE SECTION

- Best Film: Rabies
- Audience Award Best Feature Film: Plaga Zombie: Revolución Tóxica
- Best Director: Demian Rugna & Fabián Forte for Malditos Sean!
- Best Actor: Hernán Sáez for Plaga Zombie: Revolución Tóxica
- Best Actress: Ruth King for Zombie Undead
- Best Screenplay: Sean Branney & Andrew Leman for The Whisperer in Darkness
- Best Special Effects: The Theatre Bizarre

SIDE AWARDS

- Best Latin American Feature Film: Pólvora Negra by Kapel Furman
- Best Videofilm: El Turno Nocturno by Matías Rispau
- Special Mention by the Jury for Rabies to a group of actors and director, achieving a subtle and consistent performance
- Special Mention by the Jury to the Plaga Zombie (Zombie Plague) series by creative efforts over time to build a trilogy.

SHORT FILMS

- Best Short Film: Picnic by Gerardo Herrero.
- Best Director Short Film: Marc Herni Boulier for Tous les hommes s’appellent Robert
- Best Argentinian Short Film: Zombirama by Ariel Lopez V. and Mariano Benayon.

SPECIAL MENTION

- Special Mention by the Jury to Banana motherfucker, for most ambitious and psychedelic short.
- Special Mention by the Jury to ¡Toma mi mano!, for best short mostroneco and pichulín.
- Audience Award for short film: Making Off Sangriento.

=== BARS 2021 ===
INTERNATIONAL FEATURE SECTION

- Best Film: Fried Barry by Ryan Kruger.
- Audience Award Best Feature Film: Sweetie, you won't believe it by Ernar Nurgaliev.
- Best Director: Cristian Ponce, for Historia de lo Oculto.
- Best Actor: Gary Green, for Fried Barry.
- Best Actress: Gaia Weiss, for Meander.
- Best Screenplay: Cristian Ponce, for Historia de lo Oculto.
- Best Special Effects: Rodrigo Aragão, for O cemitério das almas perdidas.

SIDE AWARDS

- Best Latin American Feature Film: Leni, by Federico Gianotti.

SHORT FILMS

- Best Short Film: Killing small animals, by Marcus Svanberg.
- Best Director Short Film: Marcus Svanberg, for Killing small animals.
- Best Argentinian Short Film: Hay alguien en la puerta, by Santiago Fabrizio.

SPECIAL MENTION

- Special Mention by the Jury for best Short Film: Haute cuisine, by Merryl Roche.
- Special Mention by the Jury to Retrato Imaginario by Felipe Martinez Carbonell for best post-production (WANCAMP)
- Special Mention by the Jury to Retrato Imaginario by Felipe Martinez Carbonell for best script (Gui.Ar)
- Audience Award for short film: Under the Lather by Ollivier Briand.

== See also ==
- List of fantastic and horror film festivals

== External reviews ==
- Official website
- Variety.com news article
- Buenos Aires Rojo Sangre - Spanish Wikipedia article
- Buenos Aires Herald - news article
- Pagina 12 - news article
- Clarin - news article
- La Nacion - news article
- Interview with Pable Sapere - festival director
