= The Gryphon (TV series) =

- Der Greif
- Genre: Fantasy
- Created by: Sebastian Marka, Erol Yesilkaya
- Directed by: Sebastian Marka
- Starring: Jeremias Meyer: Mark; Lea Drinda: Becky; Zoran Pingel: Memo; Theo Trebs: Thomas; Sabine Timoteo: Petra; Samirah Breuer: Maya; Armin Rohde: Kommissar Bräker; Thorsten Merten: Dr. Peters; Sebi Jaeger: Demia; Katharina Heyer: Sara's mother; Golo Euler: Karl; Fabian Busch: Koteas; Flora Thiemann: Sara; Yuri Völsch: Ben; Maximilian Pekrul: DJ Big John; Lenius Jung: Dix; Katharina Heyer: Mother Sara; Paul Schröder: Yezarial; Peter Kaghanovitch: Ringmaster; Christian Koerner; Tonio Arango: Baron Sarn; Ygal Gleim: Gosia; Uke Bosse: Music store owner; Lars Pape: The supplier; Louis Wagenbrenner: Thomas (young); Michel Hoppe: Mark (young); Samia Hofmann: Yarmael
- Music by: Thomas Mehlhorn, Jürgen Kramlofsky; Guzz-Moji; Miller Gerard
- Country of origin: Germany
- Original languages: German; available in Chinese, English, French, Italian, Japanese, Polish, Spanish, Turkish
- No. of seasons: 1
- No. of episodes: 6

Production
- Producers: Quirin Berg, Max Wiedemann, André Zoch
- Cinematography: Willy Dettmeyer
- Editors: Andreas Baltschun, Lucas Seeberger
- Running time: 51–69
- Production companies: Wiedemann & Berg Film Production, Dog Haus Filmproduktion

Original release
- Network: Amazon Prime Video
- Release: May 25, 2023

The Gryphon (German: Der Greif) is a German TV series with Jeremias Meyer, Lea Drinda, Zoran Pingel and Theo Trebs. Directed by Sebastian Marka (episodes 1, 2, 5 and 6) and Max Zähle (episodes 3 and 4) based on an idea by Sebastian Marka and Erol Yesilkaya, who also acted as the showrunner. The scripts are based on the 1989 fantasy novel Der Greif by Wolfgang Hohlbein and Heike Hohlbein. The series was released on May 25, 2023 on Amazon Prime Video.

== Plot ==
The small town of Krefelden in 1994: 16-year-old Mark runs a record store next to school together with his big brother Thomas and his friend Memo. When the new girl Becky moves into town, she and Mark soon become close.

One day, Thomas introduces his little brother to an old family tradition: Mark should enter his name in the family chronicle. The book has been passed down from the men in the family to their sons for centuries. It describes a fantastic world in which a cruel creature, The Gryphon, exercises his reign of terror and which, according to Thomas, really exists. It is their job to fight The Gryphon. Mark doesn't want to hear anything about it at first, because ten years earlier his father Karl, apparently driven mad by the chronicle, set himself on fire in the cemetery. But Mark soon has to realize that the world of The Gryphon is real.

When Thomas is kidnapped by the stone slave hunters in the world of The Gryphon, Mark decides to save him. But The Gryphon is actually after Mark, because Mark is the world traveler, the only being who can travel between our world and The Gryphon's world using his imagination alone. Everyone else relies on a portal that is hidden in a church in Krefelden. Should The Gryphon kill Mark, this gift would pass to him.

Mark hopes for help from Memo and Becky. But Dr. Peters, Mark's therapist and Becky's father, convinces her to stay away from Mark. Nobody knows that Dr. Peters is actually an illusionist, a being from the world of gryphons who can change his shape. It tries to cause Mark to have fits of rage, as these give The Gryphon strength. Because Mark's mother Petra believes that her youngest son also seems to be descending into madness, she tries to have him committed to a closed institution. During the attempt, an employee of the psychiatric clinic is killed, apparently by Mark, but actually by the illusionist.

Becky and her friends Ben and Sara want to find out whether Mark is right after all. They accidentally bring to life a night terror, a large insect-like creature that attacks teenagers at a party and seriously injures Ben's girlfriend Maya. By falsifying evidence and erasing memories, the illusionist tries to make it appear that it was actually an escaped circus bear. But the investigating inspector Bräker knows about the existence of the illusionists. Ten years earlier, one of them, in the guise of a public prosecutor, had covered up the fact that Karl's burned body was never found in the cemetery. Bräker and Petra now also believe that the world of The Gryphon is real and they rush to the church to open the portal.

Meanwhile, Mark and Memo, who has been cured of his nearsightedness and leg problems in the other world, manage to free Thomas. But The Gryphon leaves its hiding place, attacks the three and tortures Thomas. Mark injures The Gryphon and the three boys escape through the portal opened by Petra. A few hours later, Ben enters again, unnoticed by his friends, with Maya, who is in a coma, in his arms. Not yet discovered by anyone in the group, there is a large amount of man-sized rocks in the church's catacombs, which were recovered from mines in the world of The Gryphon by slaves. Slave hunters begin to emerge from the rocks.

== Production and background ==
The two showrunners were in contact with author Wolfgang Hohlbein several times before and during script development. Some changes were made compared to the novel, which takes place in 1989. This is how, among other things, The series was moved to 1994, the main character was made a few years older, themes were modernized and the two brothers became a group of friends.

Filming took place from July 13 to November 22, 2021, in Berlin, Brandenburg and on Tenerife. Filming locations included the Spandau Citadel, Babelsberg, Heynstrasse in the district Pankow, the Heynstudios in Florakiez and the bar Fritz Heyn as well as the Chorin Abbey.

The series was produced by the German Wiedemann & Berg Film Production, the producers Quirin Berg and Max Wiedemann and the Dog Haus Filmproduktion (producer André Zoch). The production was supported by the FilmFernsehFonds Bayern, the German Motion Picture Fund and Medienboard Berlin-Brandenburg GmbH.

The camera was directed by Willy Dettmeyer, Andreas Baltschun and Lucas Seeberger were responsible for the editing, and Suse Marquardt and Patrick Dreikauss were responsible for the casting. The make-up design was designed by Andrea Allroggen, Stefanie Heiss, Maria Ratzeburg, Gloria Göschel, Monika Hübert and Johannes Gundlach, the costume design by Frauke Firl, the production design by Sebastian Krawinkel and the sound by André Zacher.

== Episodes ==
=== 1. A Remedy for Bad Times ===
Director: Sebastian Marka
Screenplay: Erol Yesilkaya
Length: 59 minutes

1984 in the small town of Krefelden. Karl Zimmermann and his two sons Thomas and Mark flee their house in the middle of the night. “He” is after them and they can no longer return home. Karl's wife Petra tells Karl that what he's afraid of isn't real, but she can't stop him. On the drive to the cemetery, Karl's head suddenly bursts into flames.

It is ten years later. Mark wakes from a nightmare, in his bed. He is 16 years old, his father is dead and his brother Thomas has been in a psychiatric institution. Now they own a record store together with their friend Memo. Mark meets the new girl in town, Becky. Ben, who has a secret relationship with Sara and wants to perform lightshows for famous DJs, also goes to his school. Ben is friends with Maya, who is good at drawing and always has her Polaroid camera with her.

One evening, Thomas shows Mark the family chronicle, an ancient book that has been passed down through the male line of the family for centuries. This describes the world of the Dark Tower, which is ruled by a powerful being, The Gryphon. Mark is supposed to sign the chronicle, which he does after a moment's hesitation. He starts having visions of The Gryphon's world almost immediately ...or maybe he's really there? One night Thomas and Mark visit the stonemason's studio in the cemetery where their father died. A plumb line seems to react to Mark in a magical way. Suddenly the large stone angels that face the building come to life and one of them attacks Mark and Thomas.

=== 2. None of my Business ===
Director: Sebastian Marka
Screenplay: Erol Yesilkaya, Boris Dennulat
Length: 57 minutes

The next morning Mark wakes up. The stone figures are lifeless again and Thomas has disappeared. Mark learns that his therapist, Dr. Peters, is Becky's father. He advises her to stay away from Mark. Petra hears about Thomas' disappearance and immediately calls police inspector Bräker. Meanwhile, Becky, with the help of Sara, finds a newspaper article that says that Karl burned himself in the stonemason's studio in front of his sons ten years ago.

Mark reads the Chronicles, awakens in the world of the Dark Tower and finds his brother. He tells him that it consists of several levels and that they are on the lowest level, the level of the mines. When Thomas learns that Mark could only move to the world of the tower through his thoughts, he understands and reveals to Mark that he is a planeswalker, who can move between worlds through the power of his thoughts. Thomas, himself, can only enter the other world through a portal in a church. Thomas is seized by slave hunters. When Mark tries to kill one of them with a stone, he suddenly finds himself in the record store, where he accidentally knocks Becky out instead. He tries to explain to Becky and Memo, but when he can't prove that the Dark Tower really exists, he throws a fit and the two friends leave. However, Mark is later able to convince Memo to search for the portal with him in St. Martens Church. They find it and go through it to the world of the Dark Tower. Memo is cured of his ailments there (a visual defect and a sore leg), but Mark accidentally wishes himself back to Krefelden, and Memo is alone.

=== 3. F***ing superhero ===
Director: Max Zähle
Screenplay: Erol Yesilkaya, Senad Halilbašić
Length: 57 minutes

Petra locks Mark in his room overnight because she fears that he, too, is obsessed with the family chronicle. Dr. Peters persuades them to release him, saying he is different from his father and Thomas. At a meeting, Mark and Becky kiss for the first time. Mark asks her to open the portal in the church the next night so he can get Memo back. Later, Sara tells Becky that her uncle had mental problems and killed himself. She therefore wants them to speak to Petra together. Becky convinces her to do an experiment first to check the veracity of the information from the chronicle. Together with Ben they go into Becky's room, take a dried flower from the book, and moisten it with five drops of water. According to the chronicle, a creature, a night terror, is said to arise from this. The instructions explicitly warn against using more water, otherwise it will get too big. When it seems not to work, the friends leave the room disappointed. Unbeknownst to the others, Ben places the dried flower in a glass of water.

In the Dark Tower, The Gryphon uses a human's body to speak through him to his subordinates. Mark finds Memo, who tells him that not just a day, but three weeks have passed for him. They discover that Thomas is part of a slave train. Becky, Sara and Ben try to open the portal, but it doesn't work. Mark and Memo jump off a cliff to escape from the slave hunters. Mark takes Memo's hand before wishing himself back to Krefelden and they both end up on Mark's bed. Meanwhile, the three friends in the church are arrested by the police for burglary and night terrors are born from the now blossomed plant in Becky's room.

=== 4. Easy Peasy ===
Director: Max Zähle
Screenplay: Erol Yesilkaya, Stefanie Veith
Length: 51 minutes

Sara's parents own a former cinema, which Ben uses to perform with a well-known DJ. Ben doesn't want their relationship to be a secret anymore. Sara then kisses him in front of her friends. Since the portal couldn't be opened, Becky gives her father the family chronicle and wants to keep her distance from Mark from now on. Dr. Peters receives a surprise visit from his patient Koteas. Shortly afterwards, he tells Petra his concern that the phrase “travel to the Dark Tower” could be code for suicide. He advises security and care, but Petra decides instead to arrange for a compulsory admission, as she had done with Thomas ten years earlier.

Mark flees from the psychiatric institution's employees into St. Marten's Church and enters the Dark Tower through the portal. An unknown man in a hoodie comes into the church and kills one of the psychiatric staff. Petra sits in a vehicle in front of the church and sees the murderer leaving the church and taking off his hood: he looks like Mark. Dr. Peters blames Becky for Mark's behavior and grounds her. He tells Inspector Bräker that he thinks Mark is capable of killing a person.

It starts to rain in the Dark Tower. A number of night terrors hatch and pursue Mark and Memo. The night terror that slipped into Becky's room climbs into her throat. She can pull him out again with pliers and kill him. Becky is now sure that Mark told the truth and takes the chronicle back.

Dr. Peters takes off his jacket in the garden, unobserved. Underneath he is wearing the blood-smeared hoodie of the murderer from St. Martenskirche. He burns his sweater, wipes a stain of blood from his neck and, talking to himself, blames himself for his carelessness.

=== 5. He’s ready ===
Director: Sebastian Marka
Screenplay: Erol Yesilkaya
Length: 58 minutes

Memo shows Mark his cabin on a lake that is regularly visited by slave hunters. Man-Iht, an illusionist who, among other things, can magically change his external shape, uses mosquitoes as scouts. He learns that Mark can no longer return to the human world and that he plans to follow the slave hunters to the mine where Thomas is being held captive.

Becky researched Mark's family history. She tells Petra and Inspector Bräker that the builder of St. Martenskirche was an ancestor of Mark. He and all his ancestors who were born later disappeared near St. Martens Church.

Dr. Peters is also an illusionist. In a conversation with Koteas, he complains that he doesn't receive enough recognition for his work. He deliberately provoked Mark's outbursts of anger.

On the evening of the party in the former cinema, Sara is grounded because of her arrest at the church. Her parents threaten to send her to boarding school if she doesn't comply. Ben misunderstands the situation and is angry with Sara. Because Sara has the key, Ben breaks into the cinema so that the party can still take place. He kisses Becky against her will, which is photographed by Maya. The chronicle is showered with beer during the party. Since there was still a dried flower inside, another night terror hatched. Maya confesses her love to Ben and is attacked by night terrors. When the creature attacks other young people, it is shot by Petra and Inspector Bräker, who have now also arrived at the party. Dr. Peters appears with the hypnotized Becky, transforms the night terror's corpse into a circus bear and manipulates the witnesses' memories.

Mark sees his father several times near the hut. Memo calls him crazy and blames him for his father's death because Mark was scared at the time and his brother had to stay with him and couldn't help his father. Mark brutally beats Memo. The Gryphon tells his followers that Mark is now ready.

=== 6. Feel your Hatred! ===
Director: Sebastian Marka
Screenplay: Erol Yesilkaya
Length: 69 minutes

It wasn't the real Memo who was beaten up by Mark, but the illusionist. Mark and Memo tie him up and question him. Under threat of torture, he reports that The Gryphon feeds on Mark's hatred. Mark then releases him. The slave hunters arrive and lure Mark and Memo to the mine.

Inspector Bräker says that Karl Zimmermann's remains were never found. This was covered up by a prosecutor. Under the influence of psychotropic drugs, Bräker was able to realize that the public prosecutor was not human. In fact, it was the illusionist who has now taken the form of Koteas.

Maya is in a coma and won't wake up. Sara breaks away from home and finds the Polaroid showing the kiss between Ben and Becky. When she returns home, she finds a note from her parents saying that she is now going to boarding school. Dr. Peters locks his daughter at home and threatens to force her to be committed. Becky is freed by Petra and Inspector Bräker; they want to use the chronicle to open the portal.

If The Gryphon kills Mark, he gains his powers and can travel between the Dark Tower and the human world at will. With the help of the plumb bob, Mark manages to free Thomas from the mine. They make their way to the portal. The Gryphon chases them. Mark reports, shocked, that it felt good to him to kill a slave hunter. Thomas criticizes him for the statement and says he shouldn't be a coward like his father was. He demands the plumb line, but Mark doesn't give it to him, whereupon Thomas knocks him out. The Gryphon overpowers Thomas, torments him and challenges Mark to fight. Mark thinks about his father's advice, stays calm, doesn't fight, wanting to make The Gryphon angry. Petra manages to correctly solve the puzzle on the portal and open it. Mark injures The Gryphon and is able to escape through the portal with Thomas and Memo.

The leader of the slave hunters wants to invade the human world in revenge for his killed friend and kill everyone Mark loves. Dr. Because of his failure, Peters is replaced by a new illusionist. Mark finds the Polaroid and is angry with Becky. But the death of Kurt Cobain brings the two together again. Ben takes Maya through the portal into the Dark Tower. In the cellar vaults of St. Martens Church there are man-sized boulders from which slave hunters emerge.

== Reception ==
Tilmann P. Gangloff gave 4.5 out of 6 stars on tittelbach.tv. He said some scenes were quite brutal and gruesome to watch, while the visual effects and the creatures were very convincing.

Eric Leimann said on Prisma.de that not everything about the series was successful and not every big picture was convincing. Others, especially the particularly disgusting body horror elements, were quite drastic and visually impressive. The soundtrack was also impressive.

Christopher Diekhaus said on Wunschliste.de that a very mixed impression emerged. Among other things, the series offered too much of a good thing in its pursuit of nostalgic flair, which was reminiscent of Stranger Things. In places it is completely overloaded and therefore feels cramped. Short detours into bloody, drastic realms seemed like foreign bodies. Occasionally the events take on grotesque, cartoonish features. The pictures did convey a little The Lord of the Rings vibe.

Christian Lukas wrote on Quotenmeter.de that the series cannot hide its weaknesses, is too long, and lacks pace for long stretches. Why The Gryphon is such a powerful creature is also not really answered. The cliffhanger arouses great curiosity for a second season.

== Awards and nominations ==
Bavarian TV Awards 2023

- Nomination in the category Most Popular Series

German Television Academy (DAfFNE) 2023

- Nomination in the VFX/Animation category (Denis Behnke, Annabelle Troukens and Jens Doeldissen)
