= Florian Panzner =

German actor (born 1976)

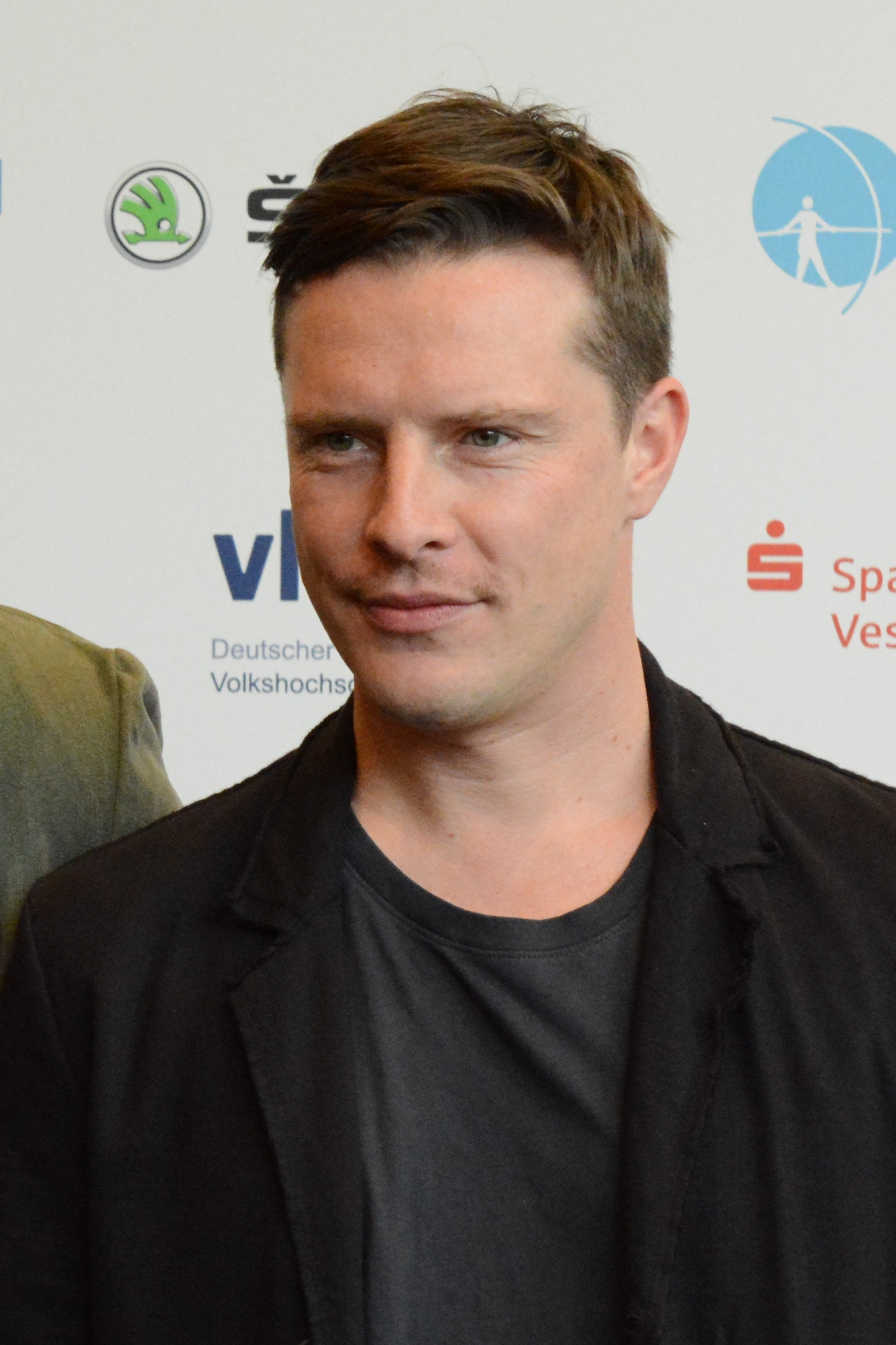
- Panzner in 2014
- Born: 20 July 1976 (age 49); Bielefeld, West Germany
- Occupation: Actor
- Years active: 1999–present
- Website: florianpanzner.de

Florian Panzner (born 20 July 1976) is a German actor who has been active since 1999.

== Life and career ==
Panzner studied at the University of Film and Television Potsdam-Babelsberg. In 2000, he played the role of Truffaldino in the comedy The Servant of Two Masters by Carlo Goldoni at Berlin's Theater unterm Dach. For his role as Hagen in the 2005 film White Silence by director Philip Hauke, he won the award for best male actor at the 2005 Miskolc International Film Festival. Panzner played the assistant to the eponymous Inspector Laurenti in the crime series Commissario Laurenti as well as carrying the lead role of Luca Permann in the science fiction television film TRUST.Wohltat. Panzner also appears in the popular Netflix science fiction series Dark.

== Selected filmography ==
=== Film ===
List of film appearances, with year, title, and role shown
Year	Title	Role	Notes
2000	The Legend of Rita	Grenzer	
2001	Conspiracy	Luthers Fahrer	
2001	The Tunnel	Heiner	
2002	Tattoo	Poscher	
2003	Wolfsburg	Police officer	
2003	Alltag	Veit Bischoff	
2003	Luther	Student 2	
2004	En Route	Benni	
2004	Kleinruppin Forever	Heiko Koslowski	
2004	Netaji Subhas Chandra Bose: The Forgotten Hero	Alexander Werth	
2005	I Am Guilty	Stefan Steeb	
2007	Sinking of the Lusitania: Terror at Sea	Walther Schwieger	
2008	My Friend from Faro	Knut Wandel	
2008	Valkyrie	Leutnant Hagen	
2010	Interview	Lennart Lamar	

=== Television ===
List of television appearances, with year, title, and role shown
Year	Title	Role	Notes
2001	HeliCops – Einsatz über Berlin	Mäx Hartmann	1 episode
2001	Balko	Ulf Pomerowski	1 episode
2002	SK Kölsch		1 episode
2002	Leipzig Homicide		1 episode
2003	Polizeiruf 110	Frank Mathias	1 episode
2004	SOKO Wismar		1 episode
2004	Tatort	Bernd „Boogie“ Borgwardt	1 episode
2005, 2010	Ein Fall für zwei		2 episodes
2005	Alphateam – Die Lebensretter im OP		1 episode
2006, 2010	Großstadtrevier		2 episodes
2006	Forsthaus Falkenau		1 episode
2006	Tatort	Heiner Matzek	1 episode
2006—2009	Commissario Laurenti	Antonio Sgubin	5 episodes
2007	Tatort	Wolfgang Brüder	1 episode
2007, 2017	Cologne P.D.		2 episodes
2009	Alarm für Cobra 11 – Die Autobahnpolizei		3 episodes
2009	Die Wölfe		miniseries
2010	Stolberg (TV series)		1 episode
2012	Die Bergwacht		1 episode
2013	SOKO München		1 episode
2014	Crossing Lines		1 episode
2014	Tatort	Nico Lohmann	1 episode
2017	Babylon Berlin	Major Scheer	ongoing
2017	Tatort	Ringo Kruschwitz, Jens Scholten	2 episodes
2017, 2019	Dark	Daniel Kahnwald	5 episodes
2018	Tatort	Bernd Fehling	1 episode
2019	Notruf Hafenkante	Der Lehrer	

== Awards ==
- Best Male Actor Award at the Miskolc International Film Festival for White Silence (2005)
- Grimme-Preis for The Impossible Crime (2014)
