= Unterwegs =

Unterwegs may refer to:

- En Route (film) (German: Unterwegs), a 2004 German film
- Unterwegs (album), a 2005 album by Yvonne Catterfeld
- Unterwegs, a song by KitschKrieg
- Unterwegs, a song by Apache 207
