= Tatort: Es lebe der Tod =

Episode 1,001 of the German television series Tatort

- Written by: Erol Yesilkaya
- Directed by: Sebastian Marka
- Starring: Ulrich Tukur; Barbara Philipp; Jens Harzer; Ygal Gleim; Hans Löw
- Music by: Thomas Mehlhorn
- Country of origin: Germany
- Original language: German

Production
- Cinematography: Armin Alker
- Editor: Stefan Blau
- Running time: 89 minutes (theatrical cut); 89 minutes (TV cut)

Original release
- Network: ARD
- Release: 20 November 2016

Long Live Death (German: Es lebe der Tod) is episode 1,001 of Tatort, a long-running German police procedural television program, directed by Sebastian Marka. The film had its international premiere at the Austin Film Festival on October 16, 2016 and was broadcast on November 20, 2016 on the German TV channel Das Erste.

== Overview ==
Chief Inspector Felix Murot investigates a serial killer, who has already killed five people. All of them were found with their wrists slit in their bathtubs. By means of a fictitious sixth murder, following a similar but different pattern from the previous acts, Murot and his colleagues manage to get the perpetrator to contact Murot. They want to make it clear, that he has nothing to do with the sixth murder. The perpetrator lures Murot to an abandoned house, where he shows the inspector photos of the previous murder victims. When the guy suddenly tries to stun Murot with a syringe from an ambush in the dark, he is overpowered and arrested at the last moment by Murot's intervening colleagues. In the interrogation conducted by Murot, the arrested Arthur Steinmetz confesses to the five murders. However, there is no definitive proof of his guilt. As a motive, Steinmetz states that he had helped people, who were either terminally ill or depressed. During the interrogation, he also makes clear to Murot his own depressive tendencies.

Finally, Steinmetz reveals that he has another victim in his power, who is tied up in a slowly filling bathtub and will drown, if not found first. Murot's assistant Magda Wächter recognizes her daughter in the kidnap victim. The terminally ill Steinmetz is willing to reveal the whereabouts of Wächter's daughter in exchange for Murot, whom Steinmetz had chosen as the sixth victim, committing suicide. The chief inspector wrestles with himself for some time, but then apparently agrees. He goes with the already considerably weakened murderer to a hotel room, climbs into a bathtub there and slits his wrists. A bicycle messenger delivers a tip from the dying Steinmetz to the police about the whereabouts of Wächter's daughter, who can then be rescued at the last second - while Murot is in danger of bleeding to death in the bathtub. Shortly before Murot loses consciousness, he manages with his last ounce of strength to turn on the faucet with his hand so far, that the bathtub overflows and the water flows into the hotel corridor and two hotel guests become aware of it. The inspector is rescued. At the end of the film, he enters a café, where Magda Wächter and her daughter are staying.

== Cast ==
- Ulrich Tukur: Felix Murot
- Barbara Philipp: Magda Wächter
- Jens Harzer: Arthur Steinmetz
- Ygal Gleim: Ralf Neff
- Hans Löw: Holger Wieland
- Corinna Kirchhoff: Behavioral specialist
- Marina Galic: Aylin Steinmetz
- Franziska Junge: Isabel Blum
- Sierk Radzei: Daniel Nissing
- Ceci Chuh: Daughter of Magda Wächter
- Martina Hesse: Mother Steinmetz
- Torben Kessler: Martin Richling
- Henning Kallweit: Bicycle messenger
- Fredrik Jan Hofmann: Paramedic
- Eric Klotzsch: Receptionist
- Jochen Döring: Emergency physician (uncredited)
- Thomas Bartling: Father Murot (uncredited)
- Piet Fuchs: Isabel's father (uncredited)
- Sascha Hartmann: Dead in tub (uncredited)
- Marvin W. Jones: Felix Murot (as a child), (uncredited)

== Production ==
The film was produced by Hessischer Rundfunk, a public German television station, and shot on 26 days from June 2, 2015 to July 9, 2015 in Frankfurt am Main and Wiesbaden.

== Releases and screenings ==
Long Live Death celebrated its world premiere at the Festival des deutschen Films (Festival of German Film) on June 17, 2016. On October 16, 2016, the film had its international and North American premiere at the Austin Film Festival. Furthermore, this episode of Tatort was screened at three other U.S. film festivals, the St. Louis International Film Festival (2016), the Garden State Film Festival (2017) and the Nashville Film Festival (2017).

On November 20, 2016, this episode of Tatort was broadcast on German television at 8:15 p.m. The film was shown on the nationwide and public channel Das Erste.

== Reception ==
=== Critical response ===
The movie news & reviews resource Wearemoviegeeks.com praised in its review Tukur's acting, it "has the perfect balance between realism and obsession. He’s great". In addition, the critic notes that obviously "there are comparisons going to be made between U.S. films like Seven and The Hannibal Lecter films, but this modern serial killer noir stands on its own." At the end the reviewer doesn't believe, that he has not seen other works of screenwriter Erol Yesilkaya and director Sebastian Marka, because Long Live Death "is a professional production from top to bottom. Yes, it has blood, it has all the obligatory elements contained within so many other crime thrillers, but it entertainingly conveys grit and underlying horror with all the horror and power that a grim story can convey."

Richard Whittaker of The Austin Chronicle explains, that Long Live Death is just another Tatort-episode, "but that shouldn't put off first-time viewers. This isn't like diving into the middle of season 10 of CSI, and drowning in old plot lines. Tatort, while it has recurrent characters, is built around stand-alone narratives." He further notes, "if there's any kinship to CSI, it's that (like that show's creators) director Sebastian Marka is a clear acolyte of Manhunter-era Michael Mann. But for Whittaker, it remains a mystery at the end of his review that "the producers picked this out of the 1,000 episodes to date as the one to introduce Tatort to American audiences". But he states, "its measured mixing of serial killer tropes and Teutonic musings on mercy and self-determination are good reason to crack open older case files."

=== Audience ratings ===
The first broadcast of Long Live Death on November 20, 2016 was watched by 8.82 million viewers in Germany and achieved a market share of 23.6 percent for Das Erste.

=== Awards and nominations ===
Festival des deutschen Films (Germany) 2016

- Nomination for the Ludwigshafener Filmkunstpreis in the category Best German Film for Sebastian Marka

Austin Film Festival 2016

- Nomination for the Audience award in the category Stories from Abroad for Erol Yesilkaya

Garden State Film Festival 2017

- Festival Award in the category International Narrative Feature for Sebastian Marka

Nashville Film Festival 2017

- Audience award in the category Episodic Competition / Long Form for Sebastian Marka
