= Festival Latinoamericano de Video Rosario =

Coordinates: 32°57′27″S 60°38′22″W

The Festival Latinoamericano de Video Rosario ("Rosario Latin American Video Festival") is a cultural event celebrated annually, since 1994, in Rosario, province of Santa Fe, Argentina.

The festival is organized jointly by the municipal government (in particular the Audiovisual Center of the Municipal Secretary of Culture and Education), and by TEA Imagen (Integral Television Production School) of Buenos Aires. It is intended for video filmmakers, students and teachers, and for the general public, and includes presentation of films, competitions, conferences, lectures and discussion forums.

In 2005 the festival was celebrated from 9 September to 18 September, in three locations: the La Comedia Theater, the Museum of Contemporary Art of Rosario (MACRo), and the Auditorium of the Municipal Bank of Rosario.

== Winners 2015 ==
Year	Prize	Country	Director	Movie
2015	Rosario Award	Argentina	Felipe Martinez Carbonell	Momento
2015	Special Mention	Argentina	Arturo Marinho	Bonitas
2015	Best Original Music	Argentina	Maia Ferro	La gallina clueca
2015	Best Actor	Argentina	Tomás Grimaldi	Basalto
2015	Best Script	Argentina	José C. Galvano	99”
2015	Special Mention	Argentina		26.061
2015	Special Mention	Argentina	Mario Armas	Mariana
