= Stephan Grossmann =

German actor (born 1971)

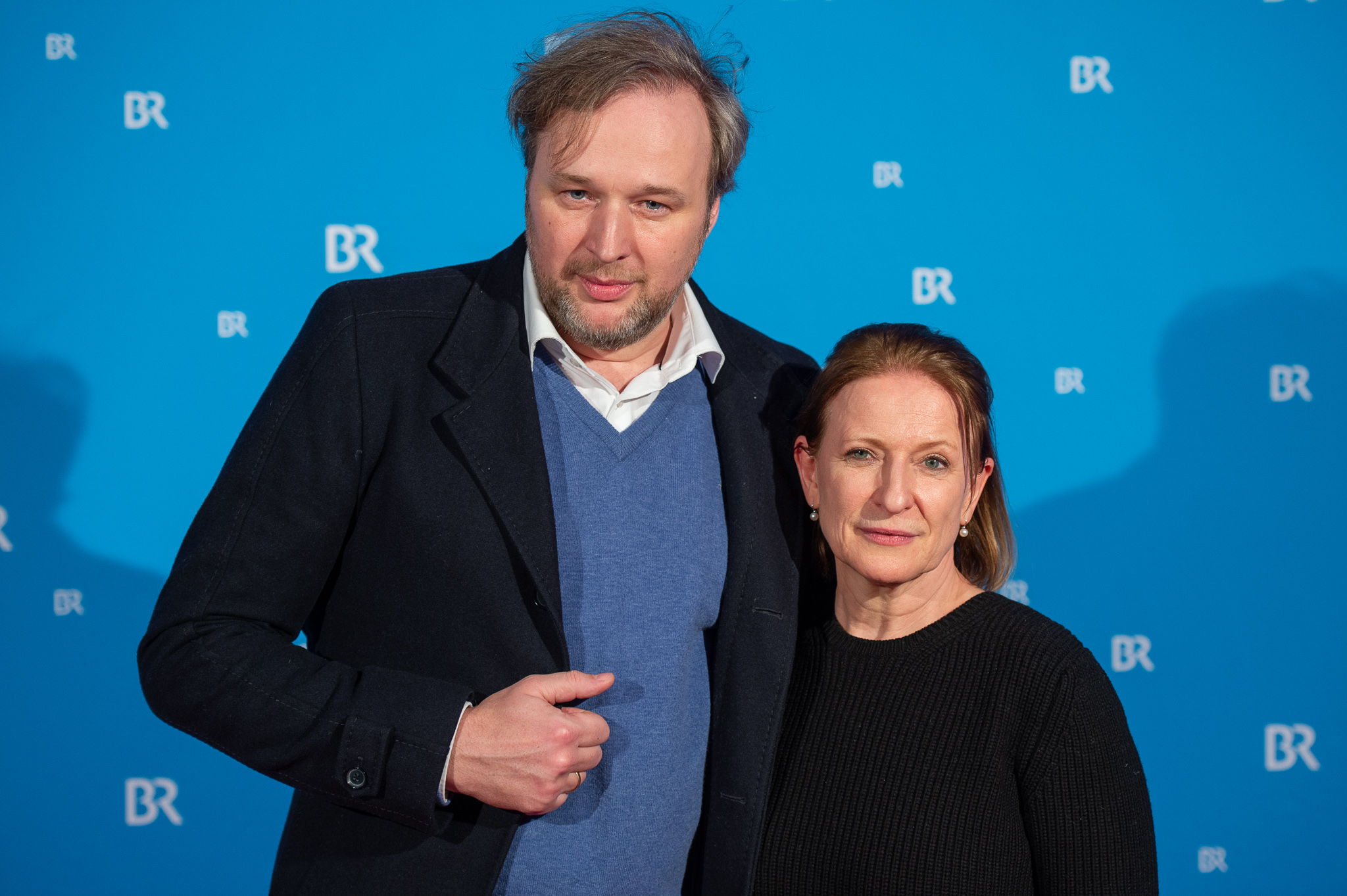
- by Stefan Brending, 2018
- Born: 2 September 1971 (age 54); Dresden, East Germany
- Occupation: Actor
- Years active: 1992–present

Stephan Grossmann (born 2 September 1971) is a German actor. He has appeared in more than one hundred films since 1992.

== Selected filmography ==
Year	Title	Role	Notes
2009	Salami Aleikum		
2010	Interview	Tillmann	
2011	Above Us Only Sky	Bruno Heimann	
2014	Amour Fou	Vogel	
2015	Sanctuary	Bruder Wilde	
2015	Look Who's Back		
2017	Ein Schnupfen hätte auch gereicht	Adrian Schmitt	
