= Felipe Martinez Carbonell =

Argentine film director, film producer, screenwriter and film editor

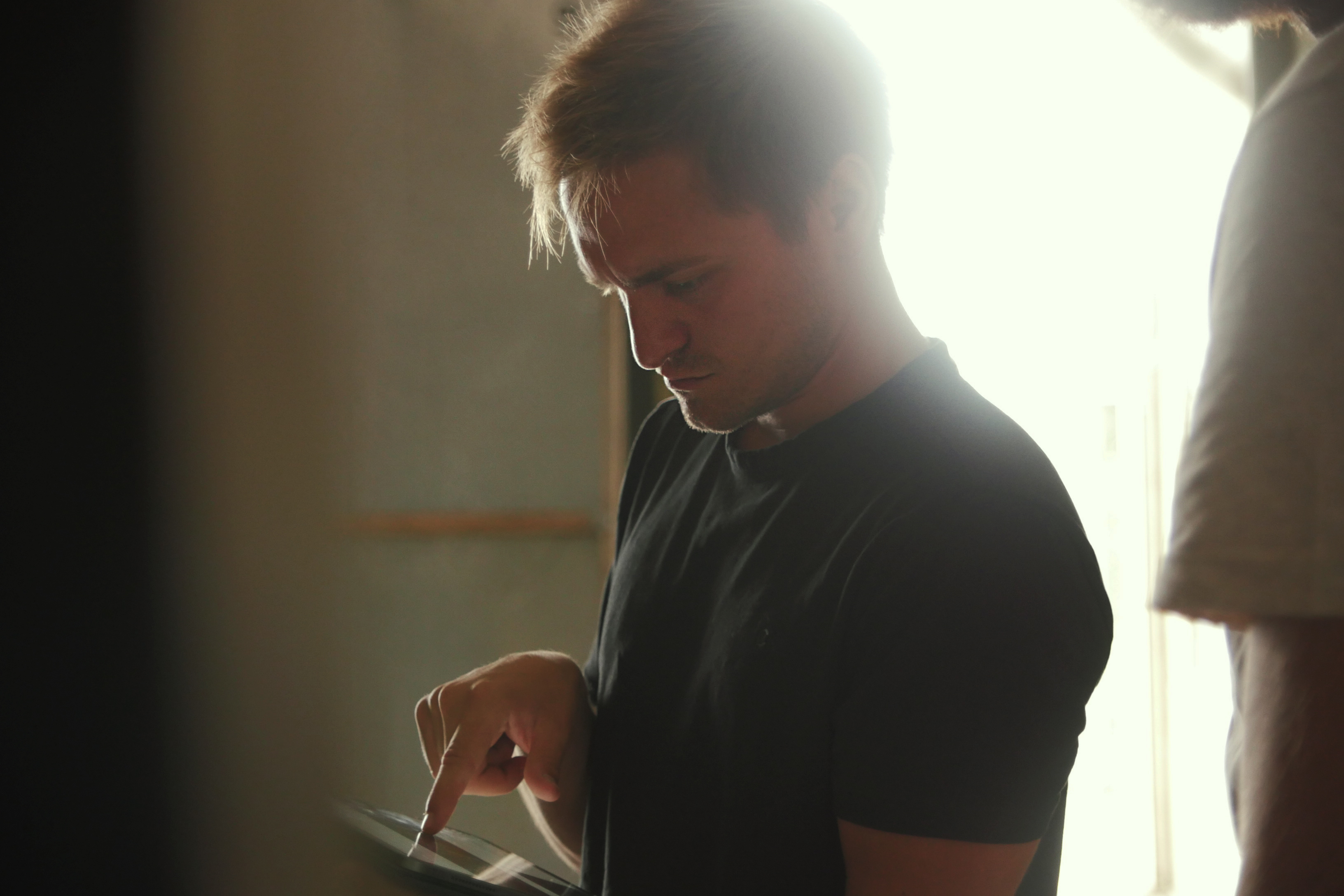
- Martinez Carbonell in September 2019
- Born: Felipe Martinez Carbonell; October 21, 1990 (age 35); Rosario, Santa Fe, Argentina.
- Education: University of California, Los Angeles
- Occupations: Director; screenwriter; producer; editor
- Website: felipemartinezcarbonell.com

Felipe Martinez Carbonell (October 21, 1990 - in Rosario, Santa Fe) is an Argentine film director, film producer, screenwriter and film editor best known for his work in the horror film genre.

== Early life ==
Martinez Carbonell was born in Rosario, Argentina. He graduated from the Provincial School of Film and TV from Rosario, Argentina (EPCTV) in 2012. He earned a Graduate Certificate in film producing from the University of California, Los Angeles (UCLA) in 2016. In addition to directing commercials and institutional videos, Martinez Carbonell also worked as a director/producer for Acento Advertising.

== Films ==
Martinez Carbonell has worked as a producer, executive producer, director, or in an otherwise creative capacity on several films where he was not credited.

=== Director, producer, writer & editor ===
==== Short film ====
Year	Film (Spanish)	Film (English)	Credited as				Notes	Ref.
Year	Film (Spanish)	Film (English)	Director	Producer	Writer	Editor	Notes	Ref.
2011	Delincuentes		Yes	Yes	Yes	Yes		
2012	Llantos	Tears	Yes	Yes	Yes	Yes		
2014	Momento	Moment	Yes	Yes	Yes	Yes		
2020	Retrato Imaginario	Imaginary Portrait	Yes	Yes	Yes	Yes		
2022	Perseguidos	Followers	Yes	Yes	Yes	Yes		

== Awards ==
- Buenos Aires Rojo Sangre Film Festival (2021)
  - Won, Best Editor and Best Script for Retrato Imaginario.
- Festival Latinoamericano de Video Rosario (2014)
  - Won, Best Film for Momento.
