= Interview (2010 film) =

- Directed by: Sebastian Marka
- Written by: Michael Proehl
- Produced by: Christian Gemeiner, Sebastian Marka
- Starring: Stephan Grossmann, Florian Panzner
- Cinematography: Willy Dettmeyer
- Edited by: Florian Drechsler, Sebastian Marka
- Music by: Thomas Mehlhorn
- Release date: 2010
- Running time: 20 min
- Country: Germany
- Language: German

Interview is a German short film from 2010. It was directed by Sebastian Marka. The 20-minute thriller film starring the German actors Stephan Grossmann and Florian Panzner was screened at numerous German and international film festivals and received many awards.

== Plot ==
The alleged serial killer Tillmann grants an interview to the ambitious reporter Lennart. They meet for a secret and exclusive interview in a hotel. There, the killer reveals explosive details of his murders and has even brought along some trophies. The eager journalist Lennart, who has been following the murders and their backgrounds with great interest for quite some time, already sees himself on the front page of his newspaper with his sensational story about Tillmann. However, the interview suddenly tilts, when everything points to the fact, that Lennart's wife Antje might have been Tillmann's last murder victim.

== Cast ==
- Stephan Grossmann: Tillmann
- Florian Panzner: Lennart Lamar
- Antje Widdra: Antje Lamar

== Production ==
Interview was shot on 35mm film.

== Releases ==
In addition to numerous German and international festival releases, Interview was broadcast for the first time on the public Franco-German television channel Arte on 18 June 2011.

== Awards and nominations ==
=== Selection ===
Buenos Aires Rojo Sangre (Argentina) 2010

- Prize Mejor Director Cortometraje (Best Short Film – Director) in the category Sección De Cortometrajes (Short Film Section) for Sebastian Marka

Indie Fest (USA) 2010

- Award of Merit in the category short film for Sebastian Marka

Oaxaca FilmFest (Mexico) 2010

- Prize Best short film for Sebastian Marka

Celluloid Screams: Sheffield Horror Film Festival (England) 2011

- Prize Best Short Film for Sebastian Marka

FEC Festival (European Short Film Festival) (Spain) 2011

- Audience Award in the category European Competition for Sebastian Marka

Filmfestival Max Ophüls Preis (Germany) 2011

- Nomination for the Short Film Award for Sebastian Marka

Oldenburg International Film Festival (Germany) 2011

- Nomination for the German Independence Award – Bester Kurzfilm (German Independence Award – Best Short film) for Sebastian Marka

Seattle International Film Festival (USA) 2011

- Nomination for the Golden Space Needle Award in the category Best Short Film for Sebastian Marka (Second runner up)

Miami Short Film Festival (USA) 2012

- Prize Best Narrative for Sebastian Marka

Newport Beach Film Festival (USA) 2012

- Prize Best Narrative Short for Sebastian Marka

Pentedattilo Film Festival (Italy) 2012

- Prize Best Short in the category Thriller for Sebastian Marka
