= Franziska Junge =

German actress and singer

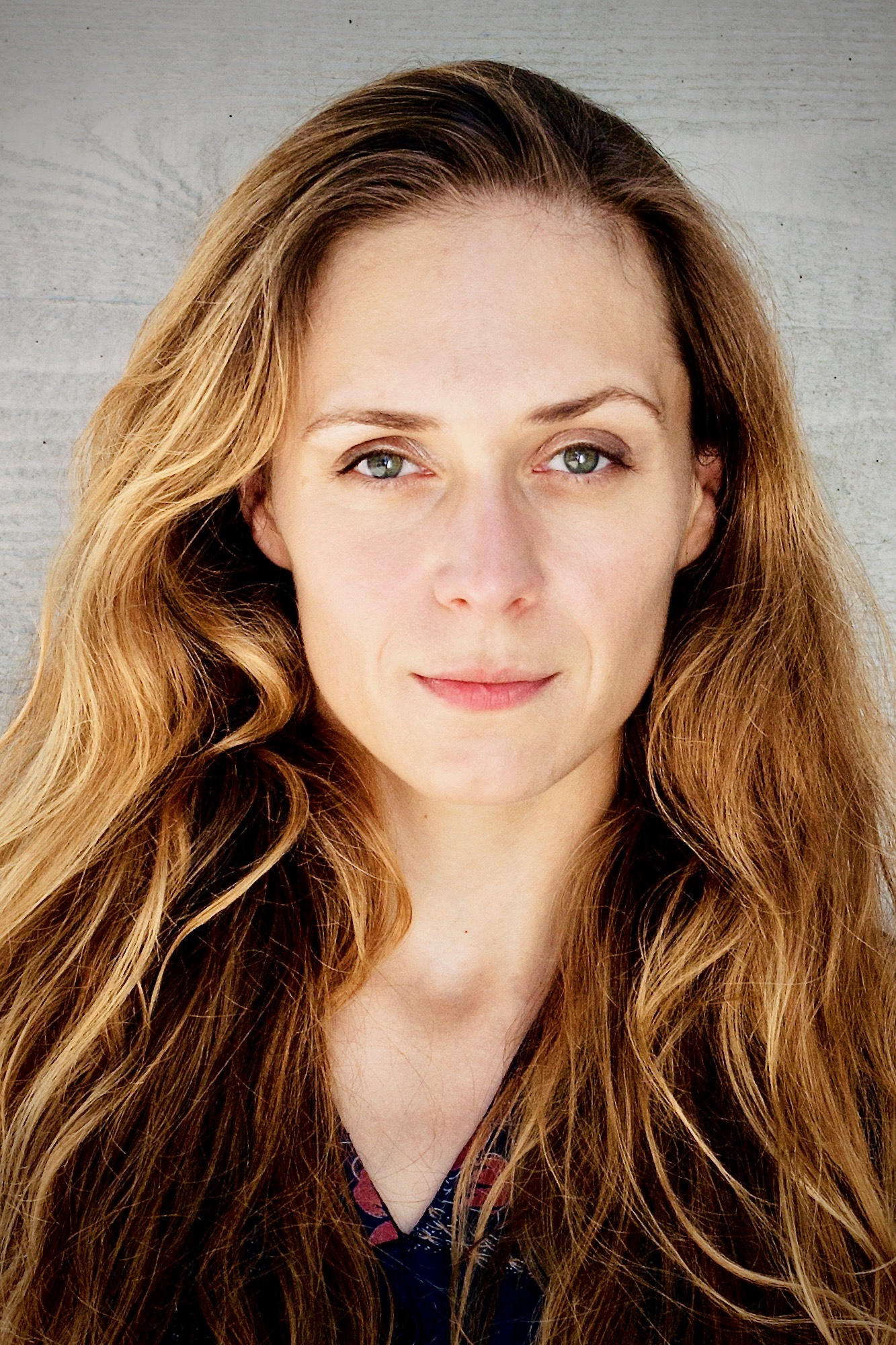
- Born: Zschopau, East Germany
- Occupations: Actor and singer
- Years active: 2001–present

Franziska Junge is a German actress and singer.

== Early life and education ==
Franziska Junge was born in Zschopau, East Germany.

She took screen-acting lessons with Jordan Beswick in New York and completed the master class for camera work "The Naked Face" with David Penn in London.

Claus Peymann brought her to the Berliner Ensemble while she was still studying in 2006. There Junge had the opportunity to realize a German premiere of the solo play Kabarett der letzten Hoffnung by Wladimir Alekseewic Klim (Klimenko) under the direction of Makedoniy Kiselev.

== Career ==
In 2007, Junge had a role in the commissioned play Pffft ... oder der letzte Tango am Telefon by George Tabori under the direction of Martin Wuttke.

She travelled around the world with the successful production of The Threepenny Opera under the direction of Robert Wilson, and took over the role of Lena in Leonce und Lena, with music by Herbert Grönemeyer, also under the direction of Wilson.

From 2009 to 2017, she was a member of the ensemble at Schauspiel Frankfurt.

In 2023 she began lessons with Ivana Chubbuck and Michael Monks at the Chubbuck Studio in Los Angeles and Berlin.

== Awards ==
In June 2024 Junge was nominated for a German Film Award (Deutscher Schauspielpreis) in the category Best Episodic Lead for her role in Notruf Hafenkante – Abschied.

== Filmography ==
- Die fehlende Stunde (2004)
- Eine Chance für die Liebe (2005)
- Das Leben des Friedrich Schiller (2005)
- Mustervater 2 – Opa allein zu Haus (2007)
- Das Scherbengericht (2007)
- Last Night of Baby Gun (Die letzte Nacht der Baby Gun) Short film for cinema (2013)
- Labyrinth of Lies (2013)
- Tatort: Das Haus am Ende der Straße (2013)
- Tatort: Hinter dem Spiegel (2014)
- Tatort: Wer bin ich? (2015)
- Dead Man Working (2015)
- Long Live Death (Tatort: Es lebe der Tod) (2016)
- Im Wald Kurzfilm für Kino (2017)
- Ein Fall für zwei (2017)
- Unser Kind (2017)
- Letzte Spur Berlin (Episode: Verspielt) (2017)
- Wolfsland (Fernsehreihe) (Episode: Heimsuchung) (2019)
- Tatort: Gefangen (2020)

== Theatre ==
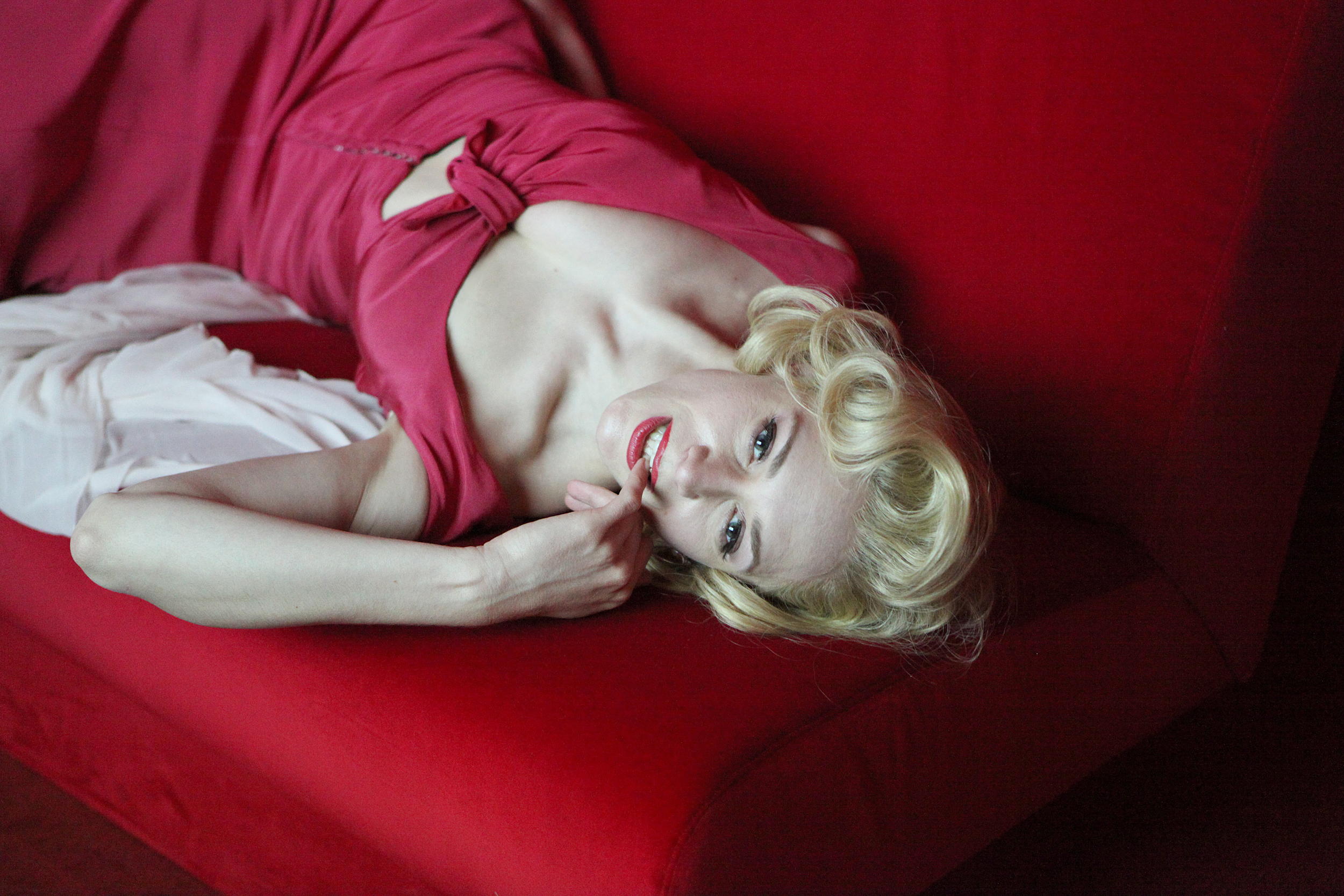
Franziska Junge as part of the production MAKING OF::MARILYN (2013, Photo: Birgit Hupfeld)

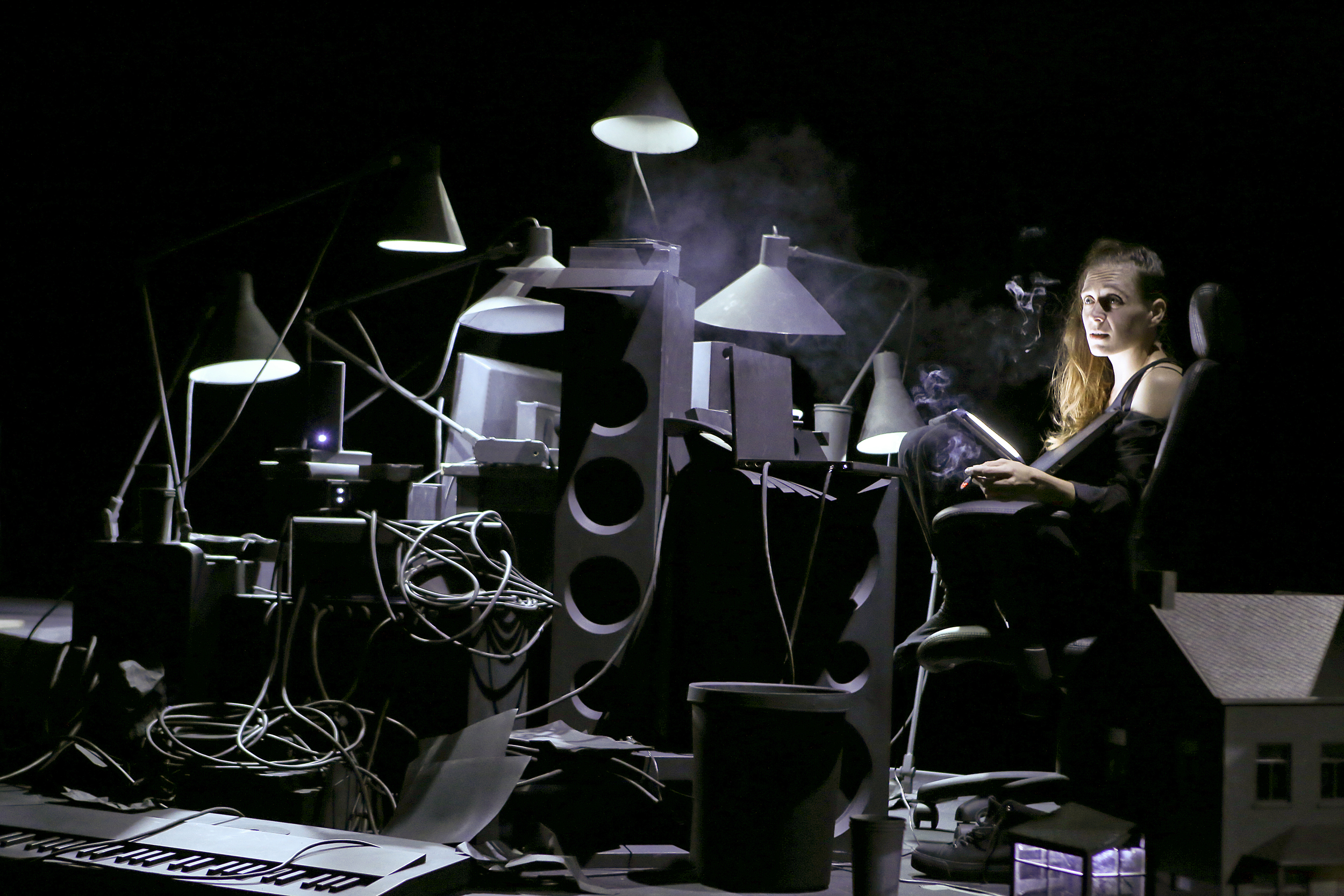
Franziska Junge in the production Nach dem Fest (2015, Photo: Birgit Hupfeld)

Schauspiel Frankfurt (2009–2017)

- Phèdre by Jean Racine – Oenone – director: Oliver Reese
- Tartuffe by Molière – Elmire – director: Staffan Valdemar Holm
- Traumnovelle by Arthur Schnitzler – Albertine – director: Bastian Kraft
- Liebelei by Arthur Schnitzler – Mizzi – director: Stephan Kimmig
- Salome by Oscar Wilde – Herodias – director: Günter Krämer
- Making of::Marilyn – Marilyn – director: Bernhard Mikeska
- Dekalog by Krzysztof Kieślowski – Ewa, Magda, Dorota – director: Christopher Rüping
- Glaube Liebe Hoffnung by Ödön von Horváth – Maria – director: Andreas Kriegenburg
- Frankfurt by Rainald Grebe – Storch, Kleist etc. – director: Rainald Grebe
- Nach dem Fest by Hans Op de Beeck – director: Hans Op de Beeck
- Die Wiedervereinigung der beiden Koreas by Joël Pommerat – director: Oliver Reese
- Demons by Fyodor Dostoevsky – Marja Timofejewna Lebjadkina, Lisaweta Tuschina – director: Sebastian Hartmann
- The Tempest by William Shakespeare – Ariel – director: Andreas Kriegenburg
- August: Osage County (Eine Familie) by Tracy Letts – Karen – director: Oliver Reese
- Three Days In The Country by Patrick Marber – Natalja – director: Andreas Kriegenburg

Berliner Ensemble (2006–2019)

- Die Jungfrau from Orleans by Friedrich Schiller – Agnes Sorel – director: Claus Peymann
- Kabarett der letzten Hoffnung by Wladimir Alekseewic Klim (Klimenko) – One Woman Show – director: Makedoniy Kiselev
- Pffft … oder der letzte Tango am Telefon by George Tabori – Chorus – director: Martin Wuttke
- Die Dreigroschenoper by Bertolt Brecht – Dolly – director: Robert Wilson
- Leonce and Lena by Georg Büchner – Lena – director: Robert Wilson
- The Threepenny Opera by Bertolt Brecht – Lucy Brown – director: Robert Wilson
- Linda Vista (Wheeler) from Tracy Letts – Anita – director: Oliver Reese

Volksbühne Berlin (2012)

- The Sandman (Der Sandman) from E.T.A. Hoffmann – director: Sebastian Klink

Kampnagel Hamburg (2010–2012)

- Dunkle Mädchen & MusicHall präsentieren Socrate by Erik Satie – Sokrates – director: Kommando Himmelfahrt
- Leviathan oder: Stoff, Form und Gewalt eines Staates by Kommando Himmelfahrt

Schauspiel Leipzig (2005)

- Hertel’s Waits for Franzy (concerts with songs from Tom Waits) – direction and arrangements: Thomas Hertel

Bregenzer Festspiele (2001–2003)

- La Bohème by Giacomo Puccini – director: Richard Jones & Anthony McDonald
- West Side Story by Leonard Bernstein – director: Francesca Zambello

Prinzregententheater München (2001–2003)

- Stella by Johann Wolfgang von Goethe – Lucie Sommer- director: Florentine Klepper
- On the Town by Leonard Bernstein – Lucie Schmeeler – director: Gil Mehmert
- Stumm&Zwang, One-Woman-Show – director: Franziska Junge
