= En Route (film) =

2004 film by Jan Krüger

- Directed by: Jan Krüger
- Written by: Jan Krüger
- Produced by: Florian Koerner
- Starring: Florian Panzner; Anabelle Lachatte; Martin Kiefer
- Release date: 17 June 2004
- Running time: 80 minutes
- Language: German

En Route (German: Unterwegs) is a 2004 German film written and directed by Jan Krüger. The movie won the "Tiger Award" at the 2004 Rotterdam Film Festival.

== Plot ==
Benni (played by Florian Panzner), Sandra (Anabelle Lachatte), and Jule (Lena Beyerling) are on a camping holiday at a sea. They meet a sinister but charming young man named Marco (Martin Kiefer) while playing at the sea. Later at night, Marco is beaten by two guys for an unknown reason before Sandra comes to the rescue unintentionally.

Soon, the four of them leave the camping site at night thanks to Marco's spontaneous idea. Crossing the Germany border to Poland, they have no idea what they are going to do there.
