= History of the Occult =

2020 film by Cristian Ponce

- Promotional release poster
- Directed by: Cristian Ponce
- Written by: Cristian Ponce
- Produced by: Pedro Saieg
- Starring: Germán Baudino; Nadia Lozano; Agustín Recondo; Casper Uncal; Iván Esquerré; Héctor Ostrofsky
- Cinematography: Franco Cerana; Camilo Giordano
- Music by: Marcelo Cataldo
- Production company: Tangram Cine
- Distributed by: FilmSharks
- Release date: 8 September 2020 (MOTELX)
- Running time: 82 minutes
- Countries: Argentina; Mexico
- Language: Spanish

History of the Occult (Spanish: Historia de lo Oculto) is a 2020 thriller horror film written and directed by Cristian Ponce in his feature directorial debut. An international co-production between Argentina and Mexico, the film is presented as the final episode of a fictional 1980s Argentine television news program titled 60 Minutos Antes de la Medianoche ("60 Minutes Before Midnight"), during which the show's journalists attempt to expose a conspiracy that connects their government to a mysterious corporation that practices black magic.

History of the Occult premiered at MOTELX (Lisbon International Horror Film Festival) in Portugal on 8 September 2020, and was made available for streaming on Netflix in Spain and Latin America on 15 October 2021.

== Plot ==
Shot in black-and-white, the film is set in 1987 Buenos Aires and unfolds over the final broadcast of the journalistic late-night show 60 Minutos Antes de la Medianoche ("60 Minutes Before Midnight"). Cancelled after a year-long inquiry into President Belasco's economic policies, corruption, and alleged occult ties, the episode airs at 11 p.m., immediately before a planned midnight rally against the president. Host Alfredo interviews Senator Matías Linares, sociologist Daniel Aguilar, and Adrián Marcato, vice president of Kingdom Corporate, Argentina's largest corporation, and a rumored warlock. Two of the guests' names appear in a notebook found at the scene of a ritual murder connected to political assassinations. While the broadcast proceeds, the show's producers—Maria, Lucio, Jorge, and Abel—monitor events from a safe house, anticipating that Marcato will implicate Belasco on air. Their colleague Natalia searches the city for a hidden artifact essential to the investigation.

During the live interview, Marcato asks Linares how many daughters he has. Linares answers two, but Marcato insists he has three and does not remember the youngest, having "given her up". The exchange escalates into a heated argument, and Linares storms out of the studio. Marcato then speaks at length about alternate realities, claiming Linares' third daughter no longer exists in "this" reality. At the same time, the journalists receive hallucinogenic tannis root from Von Merkens Labs, Belasco's political adversaries and the show's sole remaining sponsor, which they use in a ritual intended to help Natalia locate the evidence before midnight.

Marcato calmly admits on air to being a warlock, initiated into the dark arts as a child by his grandmother. Jorge begins experiencing visions of a mysterious red light and questions Maria about how many children each man implicated in the conspiracy has. Her answers initially match their records, including that Marcato has no children. This contradicts a call to the show in which a woman makes obscene remarks about Marcato's daughter. When Aguilar mocks Marcato's claims, Marcato causes him to bleed profusely from his nose and eyes. Under Abel's guidance, Maria, Jorge, and Lucio partake on a séance-like ritual, experiencing visions of a flashing red light, a burned figure, and a tentacled being.

A flashback reveals that Marcato was expelled from his coven and struck a deal with the journalists: he would expose Belasco in exchange for retrieving one of the coven's hidden artifacts. After the ritual, Jorge awakens to find Lucio missing and Abel dead. A hysterical Maria claims Abel was a warlock infiltrator who killed Lucio and attacked her, forcing her to kill him. Jorge notices that Maria's recollection of personal details no longer matches their documents, suggesting reality has shifted. Meanwhile, Natalia secures the artifact but is pursued by a coven member, whom she shoots while escaping. In the final moments of the broadcast, Natalia reaches the studio and hands Alfredo the artifact, revealed to be a modern-day smartphone. Using it, a distraught Marcato calls his daughter and confesses that Kingdom Corporate is indeed a coven that allied with beings from another world to install Belasco in power. As midnight approaches, Marcato urges his daughter to read out loud a word from a book and begins repeating it himself before the transmission abruptly ends. The film then shifts to color: Marcato has vanished, Alfredo asks if anyone heard the word, and Maria and Jorge—still in black-and-white—stare silently at the television.

== Production ==
Filming took place in La Plata, Buenos Aires, Argentina.

== Release ==
History of the Occult had its world premiere at MOTELX (Lisbon International Horror Film Festival) in Portugal on 8 September 2020. It later screened at the virtual edition of Spain's Sitges Film Festival in October 2020, as well as the virtual edition of Argentina's Mar del Plata International Film Festival in November 2020.

The film was made available for streaming on Netflix in Spain and Latin America on 15 October 2021. WarnerMedia made the film available for streaming on HBO Max in Central Europe, while in North America the film debuted on Screambox in December 2022.

== Reception ==
Andrew Mack of Screen Anarchy called the film "a thinking person's horror thriller, not one for idle minds. Staying with this cryptic mystery all the way through to its 'effect ending' will be rewarding once you have deciphered it."

== Accolades ==
Year	Award	Category	Result	Ref(s)
2020	Mar del Plata International Film Festival	Best Latin American Debut Film	Won	
