= Der Spiegel (website) =

German news website

- Website type: News website
- Available in: German, English
- Headquarters: Hamburg
- Country of origin: Germany
- Owners: Der Spiegel GmbH & Co. KG
- Chairperson: Thomas Hass
- Managing director: Thomas Hass; Stefan Ottlitz
- Website: spiegel.de
- Commercial: Yes
- Registration: Optional
- Launched: 25 October 1994; 32 years ago
- Current status: Active

Der Spiegel (lit. 'The Mirror') is a German news website. It was established in 1994 as Spiegel Online as a content mirror of the magazine Der Spiegel. In 1995, the site began producing original stories and it introduced Spiegel Online International for articles translated into English in 2004. The magazine and website were editorially aligned in 2019 and Spiegel Online was rebranded Der Spiegel in January 2020.

== Company and editorial staff ==
Regular staff includes 150 people in the Hamburg headquarters, complemented by freelancers, and news bureaus both domestic and international. In the German capital, Berlin, 15 correspondents cover the German federal government, political parties, corporations and artists. The Munich and Düsseldorf offices have one correspondent each. There are journalists based in Washington, D.C., New York, London, Moscow, New Delhi and Istanbul. The online news staff also receives support from Der Spiegel magazine's network of correspondents in Germany and abroad.

== History ==
The old logo, in use till January 2020

The news website first went up on 25 October 1994 under the name Spiegel Online, making it the first online presence of an established news magazine, one day before the Time site. Spiegel Online started as a service on CompuServe. The web domain spiegel.de was established one year later. Spiegel Online's content initially consisted of hand-picked articles from the print magazine. As early as 1995, however, original content first appeared in a section called "Scanner", which was only available online. In the following year, Spiegel Online was relaunched and commenced featuring breaking news as well.

Spiegel Online International, a section featuring articles translated into English, was launched in autumn 2004. Wolfgang Büchner was editor-in-chief of the magazine and website from September 2013 to December 2014. Büchner's former deputies, Florian Harms and Barbara Hans, headed Der Spiegel after Büchner left the company. On 13 January 2015, Harms was appointed sole editor-in-chief. Following his departure on 6 December 2016, Hans was promoted to editor-in-chief. In 2019, its editorial office was merged with the printed Der Spiegel. In January 2020, the website was rebranded, now using the same media brand as the printed format.

== Popularity ==
Der Spiegel is among the top 30 most visited websites in Germany, with record profitability. It is the most frequently quoted online media product in the country as of 2014.

== See also ==
- List of magazines in Germany
