= Notruf Hafenkante =

German television series

- Country of origin: Germany
- No. of seasons: 20
- No. of episodes: 505

Production
- Running time: 43 minutes

Original release
- Network: ZDF
- Release: 4 January 2007 – present

Notruf Hafenkante is a German television series broadcast on ZDF. It is set in Hamburg and is about the members of the police department PK 21 and the doctors of the fictional hospital Elbkrankenhaus. The show's premise is modelled on the Davidwache police station, which historically worked closely with the Hamburg harbour hospital.

The first season premiered in January 2007. In March, the show was renewed for a second season, which began filming on the 12th.

== See also ==
- List of German television series
