= Carmen-Maja Antoni =

German actress

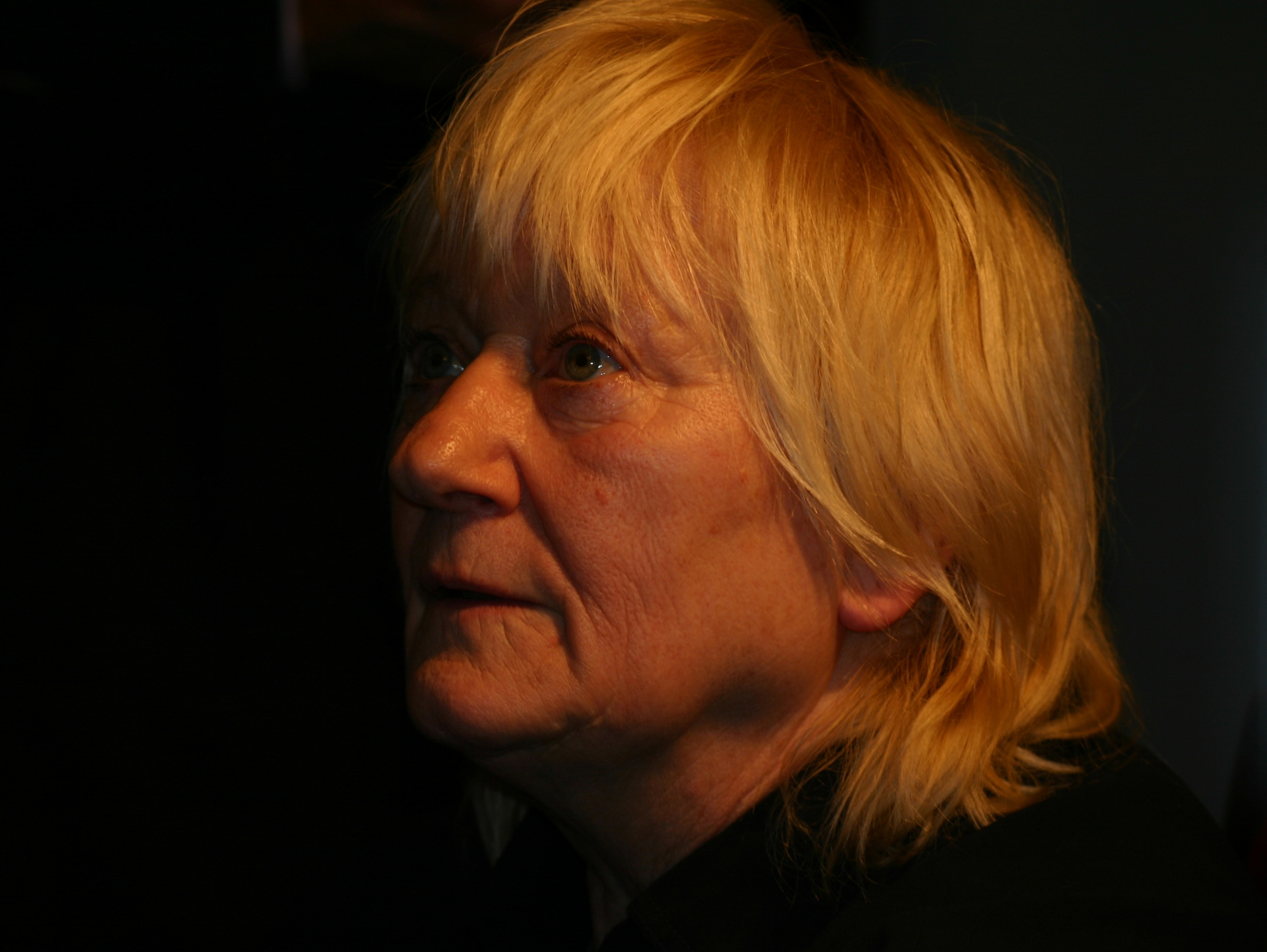
- Carmen-Maja Antoni (2013)
- Born: 23 August 1945 (age 80); Berlin, Germany
- Occupation: Actress
- Spouse: Malte Antoni (1944–1998)
- Children: Jennipher Antoni; Jacob Antoni
- Parents: Pedro Antoni; Ursula Antoni-Orendt

Carmen-Maja Antoni (born 23 August 1945) is a German actress.

== Life ==
Carmen-Maja Antoni was born into the chaos that followed the Second World War. Her father, Pedro Antoni, was an artist who left the family scene soon after she was born, leaving the baby with her mother, Ursula Antoni-Orendt, an "all-round artist" who later became a production director with the DFF, East Germany's national broadcasting corporation. Carmen-Maja made her camera debut at the age of eleven, as one of the three "Blue Streaks" in a Young Pioneer Cabaret programme on national television.

By the time of the successful completion of her final school exams she had already negotiated her way through the admissions process for the Konrad Wolf Film University of Babelsberg in the Babelsberg quarter of Potsdam. On joining, she became the academy's youngest student. As soon as she had completed her studies she was hired by Potsdam's Hans Otto Theatre. Still aged only 18, it was here that in 1964 she appeared as an exceptionally young "Grusche", the heroine in "The Caucasian Chalk Circle" by Bertolt Brecht. Her performance drew praise from Brecht's widow and from Brecht's old friend, the composer Paul Dessau. She later took the part of "Minna" in Lessings's "Minna von Barnhelm". By 1970 Carmen-Maja Antoni had moved on to the People's Theatre in the centre of Berlin.

She has been a member of the Berliner Ensemble Theatre Company since 1976, and has recently (2005) appeared there as the lead protagonist in "Mother Courage and Her Children". Over the years she has played in a very large number of stage plays and films, and her unmistakable voice has also been heard in various radio plays. In addition, she teaches at the Konrad Wolf Film and Television Academy in Babelsberg.

Antoni built her career in the German Democratic Republic during the decades of German division, but following reunification hers has become a well-known television presence across German-speaking central Europe thanks in part to her appearances in the long-running (1994–2013) ZDF crime drama series Rosa Roth in which she played Karin von Lomanski, a close colleague of Police Commissioner Rosa Roth.

== Filmography ==
- 1959: Diebe im Warenhaus (TV film)
- 1965: Der Reserveheld
- 1965: The Rabbit Is Me
- 1965: Denk bloß nicht, ich heule
- 1965: Das Glück der Maria H. (TV film)
- 1966: Fräulein Schmetterling (unfinished)
- 1967: Das Mädchen an der Orga Privat (TV film)
- 1967: Kleiner Mann – was nun? (TV film)
- 1968: Schüsse unterm Galgen
- 1968: Hauptmann Florian von der Mühle
- 1968: Ways across the Country (TV miniseries)
- 1969: Zeit zu leben
- 1970: Junge Frau von 1914 (TV film)
- 1970: Unterwegs zu Lenin
- 1970: Unsere Klasse, große Klasse (TV film)
- 1970: Zeit der Störche
- 1970: Zwei Briefe an Pospischiel (TV film)
- 1970: Der Staatsanwalt hat das Wort: Außenseiter (TV series)
- 1971: Rottenknechte (TV miniseries)
- 1971: Pygmalion XII. (TV film)
- 1972: Der Mann, der nach der Oma kam
- 1972: Eolomea (Robot voice)
- 1973: Wenn die Tauben steigen (TV film)
- 1973: Der kaukasische Kreidekreis (TV film)
- 1973: Das zweite Leben des Friedrich Wilhelm Georg Platow
- 1974: Johannes Kepler
- 1974: Nachtasyl (TV film)
- 1974: Der Staatsanwalt hat das Wort: Schwester Martina
- 1975: Blumen für den Mann im Mond
- 1975: Heute ist Freitag (TV film)
- 1975: Der Staatsanwalt hat das Wort: Geschiedene Leute
- 1975: Bankett für Achilles
- 1977: Auftrag: Überleben (TV film)
- 1978: Zwerg Nase (TV film)
- 1979: Einfach Blumen aufs Dach
- 1979: Herr Puntila und sein Knecht Matti (TV film)
- 1980: Alle meine Mädchen
- 1980: Max und siebeneinhalb Jungen
- 1980: Meines Vaters Straßenbahn (TV film)
- 1981: Der Dicke und ich
- 1981: Die dicke Tilla
- 1981: Jegor Bulytschow und die anderen (TV film)
- 1982: Der Hase und der Igel (TV film)
- 1983: Es geht einer vor die Hunde (TV film)
- 1983: Der kaukasische Kreidekreis (TV film)
- 1984: Eine schöne Bescherung (TV film)
- 1985: Die Gänse von Bützow
- 1985: Schauspielereien, episode: Balancen (TV series)
- 1986: Der junge Herr Siegmund (TV film)
- 1986: Jungfer Miras Mirakel (TV film)
- 1986: Plumps (Segment of TV series, voice only, animated by Gerhard Behrendt)
- 1987: Käthe Kollwitz – Bilder eines Lebens
- 1987: Kindheit
- 1988: Polizeiruf 110: Eifersucht (TV series)
- 1988: Jeder träumt von einem Pferd (TV film)
- 1988: Gabriel, komm zurück (TV film)
- 1989: Verflixtes Mißgeschick!
- 1989: Polizeiruf 110: Der Wahrheit verpflichtet
- 1990: Heimsuchung (TV film)
- 1991: Little Herr Friedemann (TV film)
- 1991: Between Pankow and Zehlendorf
- 1991: Ein kleiner Knall am Nachmittag (TV film)
- 1993: Ärzte: Die Narbe des Himmels (TV series)
- 1993: Polizeiruf 110: Tod im Kraftwerk
- 1994: Polizeiruf 110: Arme Schweine
- 1994: Hate in the Head (TV film)
- 1994: Rosa Roth: In Liebe und Tod (TV series)
- 1995: … nächste Woche ist Frieden (TV film)
- 1995: Mein heißgeliebter Führer. Liebesbriefe an Adolf Hitler (TV film)
- 1995: Rosa Roth: Lügen
- 1996: Rosa Roth: Verlorenes Leben
- 1996: Refuge (TV film)
- 1996: Katrin und Wladimir (TV film)
- 1996: Rosa Roth: Nirgendwohin
- 1996: Rosa Roth: Montag, 26. November
- 1996: Das Leben ist eine Baustelle
- 1997: Rosa Roth: Die Stimme
- 1997: Rosa Roth: Berlin
- 1997: Tatort: Der Tod spielt mit (TV series)
- 1998: Move on up (TV)
- 1998: Der Laden (TV film)
- 1999: Wohin mit den Witwen
- 1999: Nightshapes
- 1999: In aller Freundschaft (TV series, episode: Die Geister, die ich rief)
- 1999: Medicopter 117 – Jedes Leben zählt (TV series, episode: Die falsche Maßnahme)
- 1999: Klemperer – Ein Leben in Deutschland (TV series, episode: Küss mich in der Kurve)
- 1999: Die Hochzeitskuh
- 2001: Berlin Is in Germany
- 2001: Pinky and the Million Dollar Pug
- 2001: Inas Geburtstag
- 2001: Der Zimmerspringbrunnen
- 2002: More Ants in the Pants
- 2002: Brüder (TV film)
- 2003: Ein Schiff wird kommen
- 2003: Rosa Roth: Das leise Sterben des Kolibri
- 2004: Land's End (TV film)
- 2004: Rosa Roth: Freundeskreis
- 2005: About a Girl
- 2005: Rosa Roth: Flucht nach vorn
- 2005: Rosa Roth: Im Namen des Vaters
- 2006: Rosa Roth: In guten Händen
- 2007: Rosa Roth: Der Tag wird kommen
- 2007: Krauses Fest (TV film)
- 2008: The Reader
- 2009: The White Ribbon
- 2009: Engel sucht Liebe (TV film)
- 2009: Krauses Kur (TV film)
- 2009: Baby frei Haus (TV film)
- 2010: Rosa Roth: Das Angebot des Tages
- 2010: Keiner geht verloren (TV film)
- 2011: Crime Scene Cleaner
- 2011: Holger sacht nix (TV film)
- 2011: Krauses Braut (TV film)
- 2011: Das Kindermädchen (TV film)
- 2013: Rosa Roth: Der Schuss
- 2013: Doc meets Dorf
- 2014: Die letzte Instanz
- 2014: Mord mit Aussicht (TV series, 3rd set)
- 2014: Krauses Geheimnis (TV film)

== Radio plays ==
- 2003: Dylan Thomas: Under Milk Wood (2nd neighbour) – Producer: Götz Fritsch (Hörspiel – MDR)
- 2011: Jenny Reinhardt: Lina, König Faunfaun und der Bart des Katers – Regie: Klaus-Michael Klingsporn (Kinderhörspiel – DKultur)
- 2012: Judith Stadlin/Michael van Orsouw: Buus Halt Waterloo - Regie: Regine Ahrem/Judith Stadlin (RBB)
- 2012: Inka Bach/Ingrun Aran: Schönes Wochenende (Sie) – Regie: Ingrun Aran (Hörspiel – RBB)

== Awards and prizes ==
- 1974: Critics' Prize of the Berliner Zeitung: Best Actress of the year for the role of "Eva" in Herr Puntila und sein Knecht Matti
- 1975: Critics' Prize of the Berliner Zeitung: Best Actress of the year for the role of Herakes in Herakes V by Heiner Müller
- 1987: Critics' Prize Best Actress of the year for the role of Grandmother in Kindheit
- 1988: Critics' Prize of the Berliner Zeitung: Best Actress of the year for the role of the Mother in Baal
- 1988: 5th National Film Festival of the GDR: National film prize for the best lead actress for the film Kindheit
- 1989: Art Prize of the German Democratic Republic for her complete artistic output
- 1990: Helene Weigel Medal For the role of Mother-in-law in Der Selbstmörder
- 2008: German Critics' Prize
