= Ute Lubosch =

German actress

Ute Lubosch (born 10 March 1953 in Erfurt) is a German actress, who began her career in East German theater, film, and television.

== Background ==
Ute Lubosch studied acting at the Theaterhochschule Leipzig and in the drama studio of the Dresden State Theatre in Dresden. While in Dresden, she had her first commitment for longer engagements at the State Theatre Nordhausen and the Rostock People's Theatre. Since the early 1970s she starred in many DEFA films. Her first starring role was in 1979, as Louise Wilhelmine "Minna" Jägle, the fiancée of playwright Georg Buchner (as played by Hilmar Eichhorn) in Lothar Warneke s Addio, piccola mia. Other leading roles followed, including her role as Fräulein Broder in the 1980 film Glück im Hinterhaus (Backyard Bliss), based upon the Günter de Bruyn novel Buridans Esel.

== Career ==
From 1990, she worked primarily in theater, then was directed by Roland Oehme in the Störtebeker Festival in Ralswiek, through 2005 in Gents in Berlin with Gesine Danckwart's Should be: breaking point. In addition, she has held teaching positions at the Konrad Wolf Academy of Film and Television in Babelsberg, the Mittweida (FH) and the Ernst Busch Academy of Dramatic Arts in Berlin. Since 2006 Ute Lubosch has been making repeated appearances in the Müritz Saga.

Ute Lubosch has been married since 2008. Her son Marc Lubosch played as a teenager and starred in a number of DEFA films, including the 1989 Grüne Hochzeit, in which she played his character's mother.

== Filmography ==
=== Television ===
- Deines Nächsten Weib (1980)
- Aus der Franzosenzeit (1981) as Friederike Voß
- Adel im Untergang (1981) as Mia von Fuchs-Nordhoff
- Der ungebetene Gast(2 episodes, 1981) as Vreni
- Stimmung unterm Dach (1982) as Kerstin Gärtner
- Das Mädchen und der Junge (1982)
- Märkische Chronik (10 episodes, 1983)
- Ich, der Vater (1983)
- Bühne frei (1983)
- Schauspielereien (1 episode, 1984)
- Paulines zweites Leben (1984)
- Franziska (1985)
- Irrläufer (1985)
- Händel aus Halle (1985)
- Das Doppelleben des Monsieur Tourillon (1985) as Irma
- Zwei Nikoläuse unterwegs (1985) as Barbara Bach
- Das wirkliche Blau (1986) as Conception
- Weihnachtsgeschichten (1986) as Rose Freitag
- Alfons Zitterbacke (6 episodes, 1986) as Mutter Zitterbacke, Director Andreas Schreiber
- Johanna (7 episodes, 1989) as Johanna
- Garantiert ungestört (1990) as Cippolina
- Der Staatsanwalt hat das Wort (2 episodes, 1978–1991) as Renate, Stubenfrau
- Hüpf, Häschen, hüpf (1991)
- Feuerwache 09 (2 episodes, 1991)
- Der Landarzt (1 episode, 1993) as Frau Heller
- Der Mann auf der Bettkante (1995) as Jenna Wissbach
- Polizeiruf 110 (6 episodes, 1980–1995)
- Der König (1 episode, 1996) as Tina Wohlbrück
- Liebe Lügen (1997)
- Sardsch (1 episode, 1997)
- Abgehauen (1998) as Christa W., Director Frank Beyer
- Die Cleveren (1 episode, 2000) as Maria Blücher
- Balko (1 episode, 2001) as Roswitha Herrmann
- Wolff's Turf (2 episodes, 1995–2003) as Frau Groll, Greta Baumer
- Leipzig Homicide (1 episode, 2006) as Prosecutor Schiffner
- Tatort (3 episodes, 2000–2008) as Asha, Dr. Hildebrandt

=== Film ===
- Der Dritte (1972) as Diakonissin. Director: Egon Günther
- Der nackte Mann auf dem Sportplatz (1974) as Regine. Director Konrad Wolf
- Bankett für Achilles (1975) as Beate. Director Roland Gräf
- Ein Sonntagskind, das manchmal spinnt (1978) as Franziska Peters. Director: Hans Kratzert
- Zwei Betten in der hohen Tatra (1978)
- Addio, piccola mia (1979) as Louise. Director: Lothar Warneke
- Wie wär's mit uns beiden? (1980) as Helena. Director: Helge Trimpert
- Glück im Hinterhaus (1980) as Fräulein Broder, a.k.a. Backhouse Bliss, Director Herrmann Zschoche
- Don Juan, Karl-Liebknecht-Straße 78 (1980) as Regieassistentin. Director: Siegfried Kühn
- Aleksandr malenkiy (1981) as Tessa, Director Vladimir Fokin
- Das Luftschiff (1983) as Teresa. Director: Rainer Simon
- Das Eismeer ruft (1984) as Mutter, Director Jörg Foth
- Einer trage des anderen Last (1988) as Sittichs Freundin. Director Lothar Warneke
- Felix und der Wolf (1988) as Sinas Mutter, Director Evelyn Schmidt
- Die Schauspielerin (1988) as Rosa, Director: Siegfried Kühn
- Grüne Hochzeit (1989) as Roberts Mutter. Director Herrmann Zschoche
- Die Beteiligten (1989) as Hilde Redlin. Director Horst E. Brandt
- Die Architekten (1990) as Franziska Scharf. Directed by Peter Kahane
- Miraculi (1992), Director: Ulrich Weiss
- Lola rennt (1998) as Mutter, Directed by Tom Tykwer
- Nichts als die Wahrheit (1999) as Gerichtsmedizinerin, Director Roland Suso Richter
- Neon Aura (2010) as Manja
- Night Without Morning (2011) as Marianne Weber
