= Jennipher Antoni =

German actress (born 1976)

- Born: Jennipher Antoni; 6 April 1976 (age 49); Germany
- Education: Humboldt University of Berlin Konrad Wolff Hochschule für Film und Fernsehen, Potsdam
- Occupation: Actress
- Years active: 1990–present
- Known for: Unser Lehrer Doktor Specht
- Notable work: Hans Otto Theater Potsdam
- Parents: Malte Antoni (father); * Carmen-Maja Antoni (mother)

Jennipher Antoni (born 6 April 1976) is a German actress.

== Life ==
Jennipher (Jenny) Antoni is the daughter of Malte Antoni (1944–1998) and actress Carmen-Maja Antoni (born 1945). She studied Japanese and Russian at the Humboldt University in Berlin. After Frank Beyer employed her for her first film work, she received an ongoing series role in the popular German TV series Unser Lehrer Doktor Specht. She studied at the Konrad Wolff Hochschule für Film und Fernsehen in Potsdam. At the same time, she worked in film and television with Martin Benrath, Robert Atzorn, Thekla Carola Wied, Jenny Gröllmann, and Jaecki Schwarz.

By 2008, she was a member of the Hans Otto Theater Potsdam under the Lauffenbergs including Katharina Thalbach, Dieter Mann, Winfried Glatzeder, Angelica Domröse and Desiree Nick in leading roles on-stage.

Since 2008, she has worked as a freelance actress. She speaks English, Russian, Italian, and Japanese.

== Films and TV ==
- Das große Fest (1992)
- Unser Lehrer Doktor Specht (1993–1995) (throughout)
- Frauenarzt Dr. Markus Merthin (1994)
- Die Stadtindianer (1994)
- Kanzlei Bürger (1994)
- Wolffs Revier (1995)
- Nana (1995)
- Guten Morgen, Mallorca (1995)
- Ärzte: Herberge für einen Frühling (1995)
- Ein Bernhardiner namens Möpschen (1996)
- Für alle Fälle Stefanie (1996)
- Freiwild (1997)
- Der Landarzt (1998)
- Dr. Marlene (1998)
- Anna Marx (1998–1999) (throughout)
- Wolffs Revier (1998)
- Die Cleveren (1998)
- Medicopter 117 – Jedes Leben zählt (1999)
- Natascha (1999)
- The Legend of Rita (1999)
- Die Anstalt (2002) (throughout)
- Kino Lichter (2003)
- Kanzleramt (2004) (throughout)
- Abschnitt 40 (2004)
- Siska (2005)
- Großstadtrevier (2005)
- Zehn Gebote (2005)
- In aller Freundschaft (2006)
- Allein unter Bauern (2006) (throughout)
- Die Rettungsflieger (2006)
- Leipzig Homicide (2007)
- Bei uns und um die Ecke (2008)
- Afire (2023)

== Theatre ==
Since August 2008 Antoni has been a freelancer and guest at the Hans Otto Theater. She also acted in London at the Theatre Festival—Political Acts of Resistance.

In Potsdam she played the following roles:

- 1993: Biberpelz
- 1995: Liebesbriefe an Hitler
- 1995: Ich bin das Volk
- 1998: Kirschgarten
- 2004: Romeo und Julia
- 2004: Krieg und Frieden
- 2004: Lina
- 2004: Der eingebildete Kranke
- 2005: Aladin Rolle: Prinzessin
- 2005: Herbertshof
- 2005: Dreigroschenoper
- 2005: Haus und Garten
- 2005: Himmelsleiter
- 2005: Frau Jenny Treibel
- 2006: Raub der Sabinerinnen
- 2006: Am Ziel
- 2006: Katte
- 2006: David Salz
- 2006: Veronika beschliesst zu sterben
- 2007: Pünktchen u.Anton
- 2007: Die Möwe
- 2007: Putin hat Geburtstag
- 2007: Fuck
- 2007: Leyla
- 2008: Der Zufriedene

== Audio/Radio Plays, CDs ==
- 1995: Randow n.C.Hein (Deutschlandradio)
- 1995: Die Welt vor 50 Jahren / Feature (Deutschlandradio)
- 1996: Morgen sind wir in der Schweiz / Feature (BR)
- 1996: Massnahmen gegen den Hund (ORB)
- 1997: Was nützt die Liebe in Gedanken (Deutschlandradio)
- 1997: Louise Jakobson- ein jüdisches Schicksal in FRK / Feature (SFB)
- 1998: Die rote Zora (CD Patmos)
- 1998: Ich will keine Lady sein (CD Patmos)
- 1998: Infoplankton / Feature (Deutschlandradio)
- 1998: Bless my soul v.Lee Hall (SWR)
- 1998: Das Wüten der ganzen Welt V:Marten Haart (Radio Bremen)
- 2001: Die Kinder aus der 67.Strasse (CD Patmos)
- 2001: Die Vaginamonologe (CD Patmos)
- 2005: Stimmen aus der Wand (WDR)
- 2006: Frankenstein in Hiroshima / Feature (WDR)
- 2007: Nothing to know but coffee to go (Deutschlandradio)
- 2007: Die Playmos (CD)
- 2007: Willi will's wissen (CD)
- 2007: Lümmel (CD)
- 2008: Die Pogrom-Nächte von Hassi Messaoud / Feature (RBB)
- 2008: Herr Ombuwesi lernt tanzen (Berliner Hörspiele)
- 2009: No und Ich (Hörbuch Steinbach)

== Other Parts ==
- 2005: Monk (Hermes Synchron)
- 2005: Kommissar Wallner
- 2005: Over there (Cinephon)
- 2005: Bibi und Toni (Kiddinx)
- 2005: Kommissar Wallner (Taunus)
- 2006: Gilmore Girls (Blackbird Music)
- 2006: CSI N.Y. (Interopa)
- 2006: Mastermind Svaga (Taunus )
- 2008: The Hottie and the Nottie DVD (VSI Synchron)

== Awards and nominations ==
Antoni has received the following awards and nominations:

- 1999: Nominated for the Hessischen Rundfunk for the role of Eva in the film Natascha
- 2002: Lilly Schizophrenia Award 2002 for the television series Die Anstalt
- 2007: Nominated for the Friedrich Luft Prize at the Hans-Otto Theater in Potsdam for her role in Fuck by S. Weber
