= Jörg Schüttauf =

German actor (born 1961)

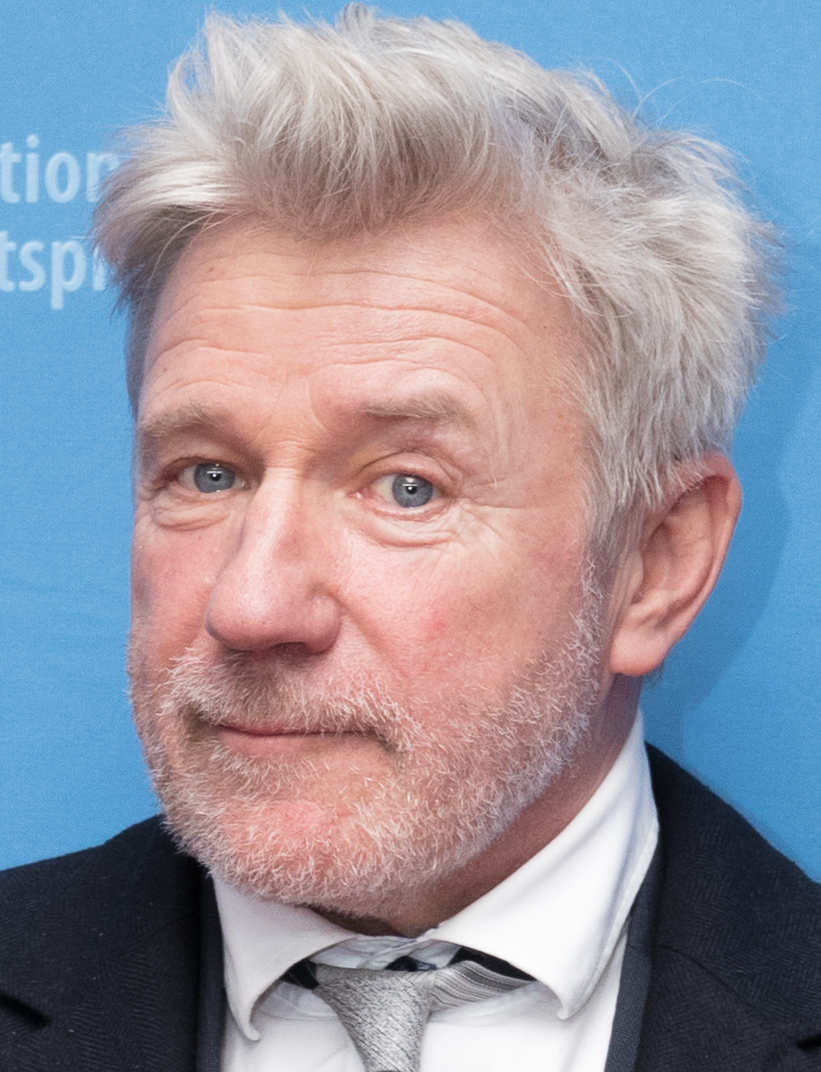
- Schüttauf at the Berlinale 2018
- Born: 26 December 1961 (age 64); Karl-Marx-Stadt, East Germany
- Education: Theaterhochschule Leipzig
- Occupation: Actor
- Years active: 1985–present

Jörg Schüttauf (born 26 December 1961) is a German actor. He studied at the Theaterhochschule Leipzig. Since 2002 he has starred in the Hessischer Rundfunk version of the popular television crime series Tatort.

== Filmography ==
=== Film ===
- 1985: Ete und Ali
- 1990: Die Architekten
- 1992: Lenz
- 1996: Viel Spaß mit meiner Frau
- 1998: Bis zum Horizont und weiter
- 2001: Berlin Is in Germany
- 2003: September
- 2008: The Wall: The Final Days (als Bernd Hoffmann)
- 2009: My Beautiful Neighbor
- 2009: I've Never Been Happier
- 2021: Dear Thomas

=== Television ===
- 1987: Der Staatsanwalt hat das Wort: Unbefleckte Empfängnis
- 1987: Der Staatsanwalt hat das Wort: Unter einem Dach
- 1989: Polizeiruf 110: Drei Flaschen Tokajer
- 1990: Polizeiruf 110: Tödliche Träume
- 1991: Polizeiruf 110: Mit dem Anruf kommt der Tod
- 1994–1997: Der Fahnder
- 1994: Der große Abgang
- 1996: Tatort: Schneefieber
- 1997: Viel Spaß mit meiner Frau
- 1997: Alte Liebe
- 1998: Sperling und das schlafende Mädchen
- 1998: Der Laden (TV miniseries)
- 1999: Waiting Means Death
- 1999: Ich habe Nein gesagt
- 1999: Castor
- 1999: Die Cleveren: Gier
- 2000: Bella Block: Abschied im Licht
- 2001: Liebesau - mitten in Deutschland
- 2001: Das Traumschiff: Mexiko
- 2002: Operation Rubikon
- 2002–2010: Tatort (18 episodes as Kommissar Fritz Dellwo)
  - Oskar (2002)
  - Frauenmorde (2003)
  - Das Böse (2003)
  - Janus (2004)
  - Herzversagen (2004)
  - Wo ist Max Gravert? (2005)
  - Leerstand (2005)
  - Das letzte Rennen (2006)
  - Der Tag des Jägers (2006)
  - Unter uns (2007)
  - Bevor es dunkel wird (2007)
  - Der frühe Abschied (2008)
  - Waffenschwestern (2008)
  - Der tote Chinese (2008)
  - Neuland (2009)
  - Architektur eines Todes (2009)
  - Weil sie böse sind (2010)
  - Am Ende des Tages (2010)
- 2003: Nachbarinnen
- 2004: Der Stich des Skorpion
- 2004: Murderous Search
- 2004: Schlafsack für zwei
- 2004: Das Schwalbennest
- 2005: Polizeiruf 110: Hoffnung auf Glück
- 2005: Die letzte Schlacht
- 2005: Arnies Welt
- 2006: Tatort: Außer Gefecht
- 2007: Küss mich, Genosse!
- 2007: Nichts ist vergessen
- 2009: Die Blücherbande
- 2009: Das Paradies am Ende der Welt
- 2009: Das total verrückte Wochenende
- 2010: Congo
- 2011: Stankowski's Millions
- 2015: Death of a Girl
- 2018: 13 Uhr mittags
- 2018: Bad Banks
