= Kehler =

Kehler is a German surname.

== People ==
- Claude Robert "Bob" Kehler (born 1952), United States Air Force general
- Lisa Martine Kehler (née Langford, born 1967), English race walker
- Randy Kehler (born 1944) US pacifist activist and advocate for social justice
- Sonja Kehler (1933–2016), German actress and chanson singer
- Tim Kehler (born 1971), Canadian professional ice hockey coach
- Keith Ransom-Kehler (1876–1933), US Bahá'í

== Other ==
- Kehler FV, German association football club from Kehl
