= Offset (film) =

- Directed by: Didi Danquart
- Written by: Didi Danquart, Cristi Puiu, Razvan Radulescu
- Produced by: Philippe Avril, Andi Huber, Alfred Hurmer, Boris Michalski, Cristian Mungui, Wernfried Natter, Ada Solomon
- Starring: Alexandra Maria Lara, Felix Klare, Răzvan Vasilescu
- Edited by: Nico Hain
- Release date: 2 November 2006
- Countries: Romania, France, Germany, Switzerland
- Languages: Romanian; German

Offset is a 2006 drama film directed and written by Didi Danquart and was filmed in Bucharest.

== Plot ==
The plot focuses on the lives of the soon to be married Stefan, a German working in Romania for a wealthy and eccentric printing company owner, Nicu Iorga and his soon-to-be bride Brindusa, who is Nicu's secretary. Life seems great for both of them, despite the eminent long affair that Nicu had with Brindusa. All the preparations are made for the wedding, Stefan's family arrives, and the soon-to-be bride and groom buy their wedding attire. A newly arrived German (who was set to replace Stefan at the printing company due to a fight with Nicu) Peter Gross is invited to the wedding after he becomes friends with both Stefan and Brindusa. Nicu, armed with a gun (and accompanied by several henchmen), crashes the wedding ceremony and threatens everyone present, including Stefan's father Ernst and Brindusa's father Mr. Hergehelegiu. He even punches Peter in the nose, after which he shoots himself and is taken to the hospital. At the hospital, Brindusa tells Stefan that he should go to Germany to pursue a better life, revealing to him that she still has feelings for Nicu. Although it is not stated in the movie, it is assumed Nicu survives the gunshot. The film ends with an enraged Stefan asking Peter about his nose just outside the hospital, after which they go down the road.

== Cast ==
- Alexandra Maria Lara as Brindusa
- Felix Klare as Stefan
- Razvan Vasilescu as Nicu Iorga
- Valentin Plătăreanu as Mr. Hergehelegiu
- Katharina Thalbach as Stefan's Mother
- Manfred Zapatka as Stefan's Father
- Bruno Cathomas as Peter Gross
- Andreea Bibiri as Wedding shop sales girl
- Friedel Morgenstern

== Critical reception ==
Variety, "Especially successful in filming dialogue and keeping it natural in several languages, Danquart establishes a rhythm that nicely balances tensions with scenes of genuine warmth."

The film screened at the 2007 Seattle International Film Festival, "Danquart's portrait of post-Communist Romania in the EU era explores the tensions with a prickly humor more wry that funny, and not particularly optimistic."
