= Die Architekten =

1990 film

- Directed by: Peter Kahane
- Screenplay by: Thomas Knauf; Peter Kahane
- Produced by: Herbert Ehler
- Cinematography: Andreas Köfer
- Edited by: Ilse Peters
- Music by: Tamas Kahane
- Release date: 1990
- Running time: 107 minutes
- Country: East Germany
- Language: German

Die Architekten (The Architects) is an East German film directed by Peter Kahane. It was released in 1990.

== Plot ==
Daniel Brenner is an East German architect in his late thirties. Despite a top university degree, his professional life revolves around bus shelters and telephone booths. Then he receives a commission to design a cultural center for a satellite town. Brenner accepts under the condition that he will be allowed to select his own team. Their plan to create a non-conventional design fails. His wife and their daughter leave the country for West Germany. Broken and disillusioned, Brenner collapses in front of the project's inauguration tribune.

== Cast ==
- Kurt Naumann as Daniel Brenner
- Rita Feldmeier as Wanda Brenner
- Uta Eisold as Renate Reese
- Jürgen Watzke as Martin Bulla
- Ute Lubosch as Franziska Scharf
- Jörg Schüttauf as Wilfried Berger

== Music ==
The music was written by Tamas Kahane. The film's songs counterpoint its images: Unsere Heimat is added to scenes of urban canyons, the Berlin Wall, industrial complexes and prefabricated housing developments. The protagonist collapses to the tunes of Handel's Messiah.

== Reception ==
With less than 6,000 tickets sold, the film received scant attention at the time of release. In retrospect it is considered a significant cineastic contribution to the country's time of transition.
