= Alexandra Maria Lara =

Romanian-German actress (born 1978)

- Alexandra Maria Lara at the 76th Berlin International Film Festival
- Born: Alexandra Maria Plătăreanu; 12 November 1978 (age 48); Bucharest, Romanian SR
- Occupation: Actress
- Years active: 1994–present
- Spouse: Sam Riley (m. 2009)
- Children: 1
- Father: Valentin Plătăreanu

Alexandra Maria Lara (née Plătăreanu; 12 November 1978) is a Romanian-German actress, best known internationally for her roles in the films Downfall (2004), Control (2007), Youth Without Youth (2007), The Reader (2008), Rush (2013), and Geostorm (2017). From 2022 to 2025, she served as co-president of the Deutsche Filmakademie.

== Early life ==
Born in Bucharest, Lara is the only child of actor Valentin Plătăreanu and his wife, Doina. Her father was a successful actor and director in Romania, directing many plays such as Much Ado About Nothing by William Shakespeare and Hernani by Victor Hugo.

In 1983, her family emigrated to West Germany from their home in Bucharest, Romania. Although the family had originally planned to emigrate to Canada, they settled in Freiburg im Breisgau, before eventually moving to West Berlin. She became fluent in German.

== Career ==
By the age of sixteen, Lara was playing lead roles in various television dramas; since then she has appeared in films, including as Traudl Junge, Adolf Hitler's secretary, in the Academy Award-nominated 2004 film Downfall; following this Francis Ford Coppola wrote her a letter and gave her a leading role in Youth Without Youth (2007).

In 2007, Lara appeared as Belgian journalist Annik Honoré in the biopic Control. In 2008 she served as a member of the Cannes Film Festival jury. She has also appeared in several French productions, including Napoléon and L'Affaire Farewell. She appeared in The Reader and Der Baader Meinhof Komplex, which were both nominated for the 81st Academy Awards for best picture and best foreign language film respectively.

In 2018, Lara starred with her husband, Sam Riley, in Happy New Year, Colin Burstead by Ben Wheatley, playing his German girlfriend.

Alongside Florian Gallenberger, Lara served as president of the Deutsche Filmakademie from 2022 to 2025.

== Personal life ==
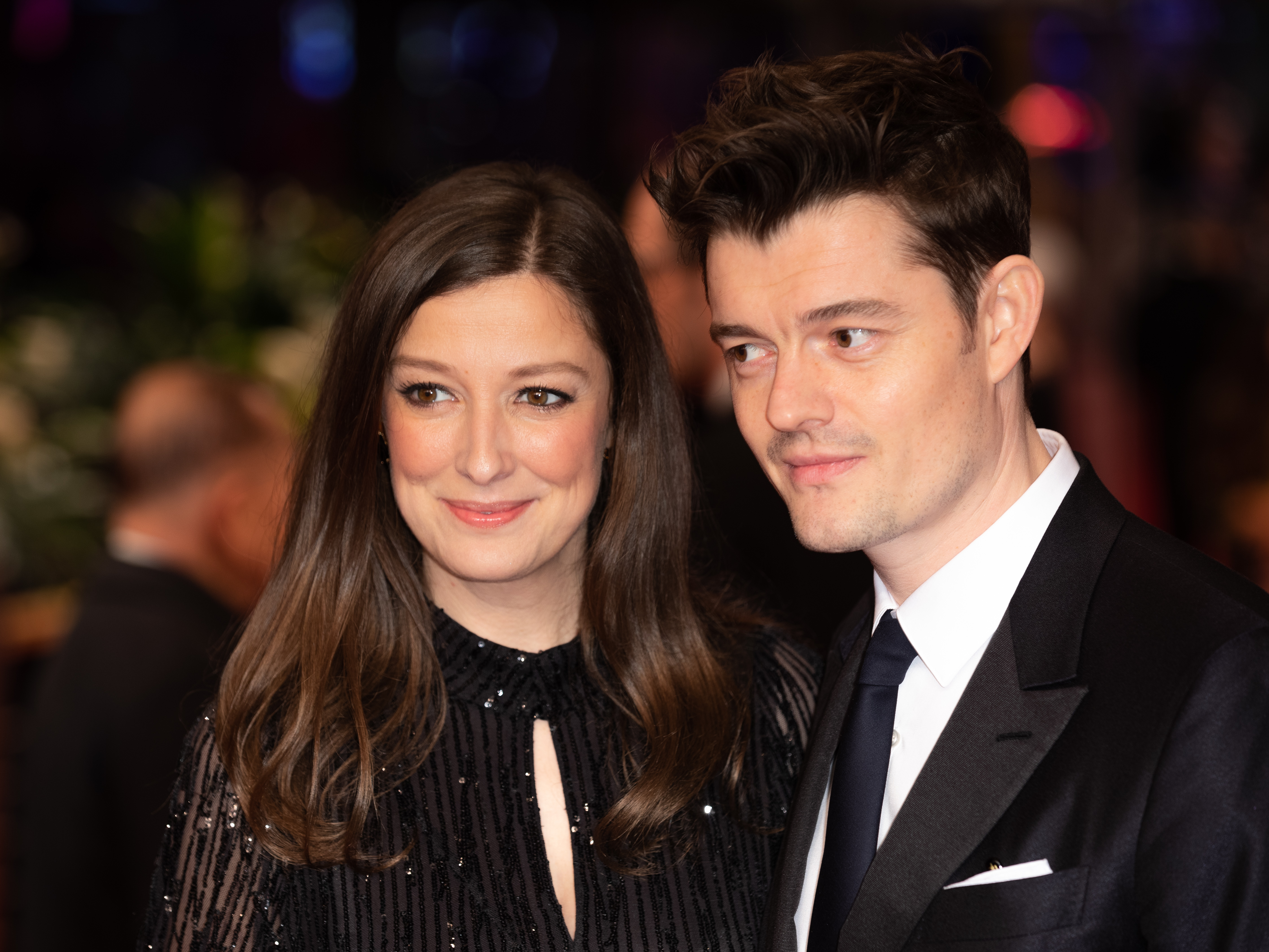
Lara with husband Sam Riley at the 70th Berlin International Film Festival on 20 February 2020

In August 2009, Lara married English actor Sam Riley, with whom she had acted in the films Control and Suite Française. In January 2014, she gave birth to their first child, a boy. They played a couple on screen in Ben Wheatley's drama Happy New Year, Colin Burstead.

== Filmography ==
Year	Film	Role	Notes
1995	I Desire You	Mädchen am Bahnhof	
1997	Das Vorsprechen	Junge Schauspielerin	Short film
1999	Sperling (Sperling und der falsche Freund)		
1999	Our Island in the South Pacific	Sandra	
2000	Just Messing About	Hanna	
2000	Crazy	Melanie	
2001	Honolulu	Cleonise	
2001	99 Euro Films		Segment "Privat"
2001	Leo & Claire	Käthe Katzenberger	
2002	If It Don't Fit, Use a Bigger Hammer	Astrid	
2002	Naked	Annette	
2004	Leise Krieger	Nora	Short film
2004	Downfall	Traudl Junge	
2004	Cowgirl	Johanna "Paula" Jakobi / Murderous Lady im Film Noir	
2005	About the Looking for and the Finding of Love	Venus Morgenstern	
2005	The Fisherman and His Wife	Ida	
2006	Offset	Brindusa Herghelegiu	
2006	Where Is Fred?	Denise Poppnick	
2007	Control	Annik Honore	
2007	I Really Hate My Job	Suzie	
2007	Youth Without Youth	Veronica / Laura / Rupini	
2008	Miracle at St. Anna	Axis Sally	
2008	The Baader Meinhof Complex	Petra Schelm	
2008	The Reader	Young Ilana Mather	
2009	Kaifeck Murder	Juliana Lukas	
2009	The City of Your Final Destination	Deirdre Rothemund	
2009	Farewell	Jessica	
2009	City of Life	Natalia Moldovan	
2010	The Nazi Officer's Wife		
2010	A Distant Neighborhood	Anna Verniaz	
2010	Small World	Simone Senn	
2011	Woman in Love	Sarah	
2012	Lullaby Ride	Livia	
2012	Imagine	Eva	
2012	Move On	Lena	
2013	Rush	Marlene Lauda	
2015	Suite Française	Leah	
2016	The Most Beautiful Day	Mona	
2016	Robbi, Tobbi und das Fliewatüüt	Sharon Schalldämpfer (voice)	
2016	Sing	Rosita (voice)	German-language dub
2016	Vier gegen die Bank	Freddie	
2017	Geostorm	Ute Fassbinder	
2018	25 km/h	Ingrid	
2018	Sealed Lips	Antonia Berger	
2018	Happy New Year, Colin Burstead	Hannah	
2019	The Collini Case	Johanna	
2020	Børning 3: Asphalt Burning	Robin	
2021	The King's Man	Emily Oxford	
2022	The Sitting Duck	Julie	
2025	Bulk	Aclima	
2026	Eat Pray Bark	Ursula Brandmeier	

=== Television ===
Year	Film	Role	Notes
1994	Stella Stellaris		Miniseries
1996	Mensch, Pia!	Pia Mangold	10 episodes
1997	Faust	Laura	Episode: "Tote weinen nicht"
1998	Girl's Trap – Death Comes Online	Silke Hartmann	TV film
1998	Tatort	Kerstin	Episode: "Fürstenschüler"
1998	The Bubi Scholz Story	Young Renate	TV film
1999	Polizeiruf 110	Meike	Episode: "Sumpf"
2000	Vertrauen ist alles	Jennifer Blankenburg	TV film
2000	Lady Cop	Sabine Sasse	Episode: "Die Geliebte des Killers"
2000	Force Majeure	Nicolette	TV film
2001	The Tunnel	Charlotte "Lotte" Lohmann	TV film
2002	Liebe und Verrat	Marie Irimia	TV film
2002	Schleudertrauma	Doreen	TV film
2002	Napoléon	Comtesse Marie Walewska	Miniseries
2002	Doctor Zhivago	Tonya Gromyko Zhivago	Miniseries
2002	Trenck	Princess Amélie	TV film
2004	The Wishing Tree	Camilla Senger geb. Hofmann	Miniseries
2007	The Company	Lili	Miniseries
2017	You Are Wanted	Hanna Franke	12 episodes
2022	Toutes ces choses qu'on ne s'est pas dites	Julia Saurel	9 episodes
