= Berlin Is in Germany =

2001 film by Hannes Stöhr

- Directed by: Hannes Stöhr
- Starring: Jörg Schüttauf; Julia Jäger
- Release date: 8 February 2001 (BIFF)
- Running time: 1h 39min
- Country: Germany
- Language: German

Berlin Is in Germany is a 2001 German drama film directed by Hannes Stöhr. Hannes Stöhr's first cinema feature, the film won the Panorama Audience award at the International Berlin Filmfestival 2001, the German critics association award, the Studio Hamburg award, and many others.

== Cast ==
- Jörg Schüttauf as Martin
- Julia Jäger as Manuela
- Robin Becker as Rokko
- Robert Lohr as Wolfgang
- Tom Jahn as Peter
- Valentin Plătăreanu as Victor
- Edita Malovčić as Ludmila
- Oscar Martínez as Enrique
- Carmen-Maja Antoni as Bewährungshelferin
