= Julia Jäger =

German actress

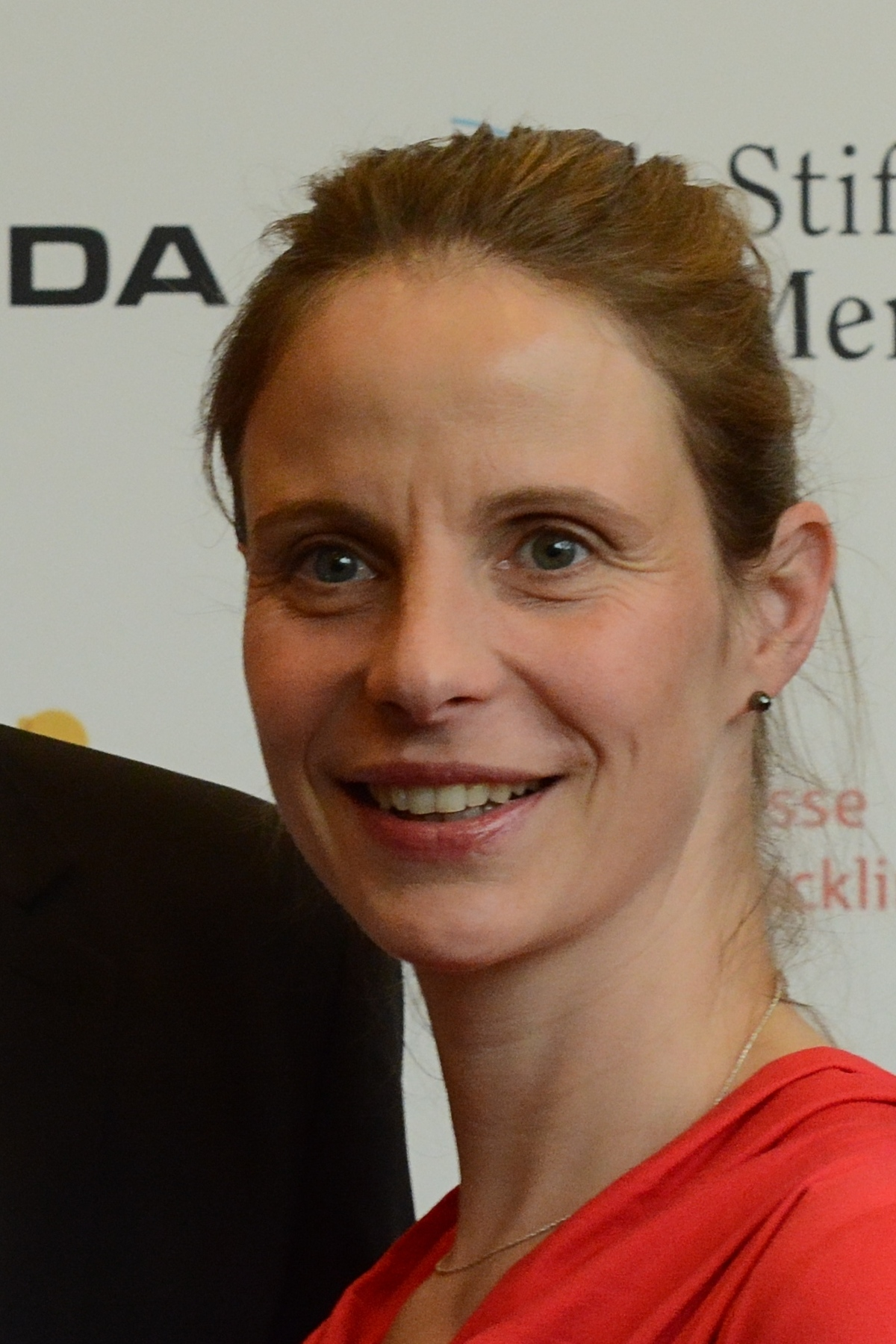
Julia Jäger at the Grimme Awards 2014

Julia Jäger (born 28 January 1970) is a German actress.

Jäger was born in Angermünde, Brandenburg, and grew up in Frankfurt (Oder), where her father Diether Jäger was a stage actor. At the age of 13, she appeared in the children's film Moritz in der Litfaßsäule. From 1988 to 1991 she studied at the Theaterhochschule Leipzig and was immediately afterwards engaged by the municipal theatre of Leipzig (Schauspiel Leipzig), being an ensemble member until 1995.

Jäger has appeared in multiple movies like Karniggels (1991), Outside Time (1995), Berlin Is in Germany (2001), and the Oscar-winning short film Toyland (2007); as well as telefilms and series including Polizeiruf 110 (since 1994), Siska (2000), Der letzte Zeuge (2002–2003), Tatort (since 2003), Donna Leon (2003–2019), Die Frau vom Checkpoint Charlie (2007), Zeit der Helden (2013).

She won the Best Actress award of the Cairo International Film Festival 1996 and the 2014 Grimme Award.
