= Friedel Morgenstern =

German voice actress (born 1993)

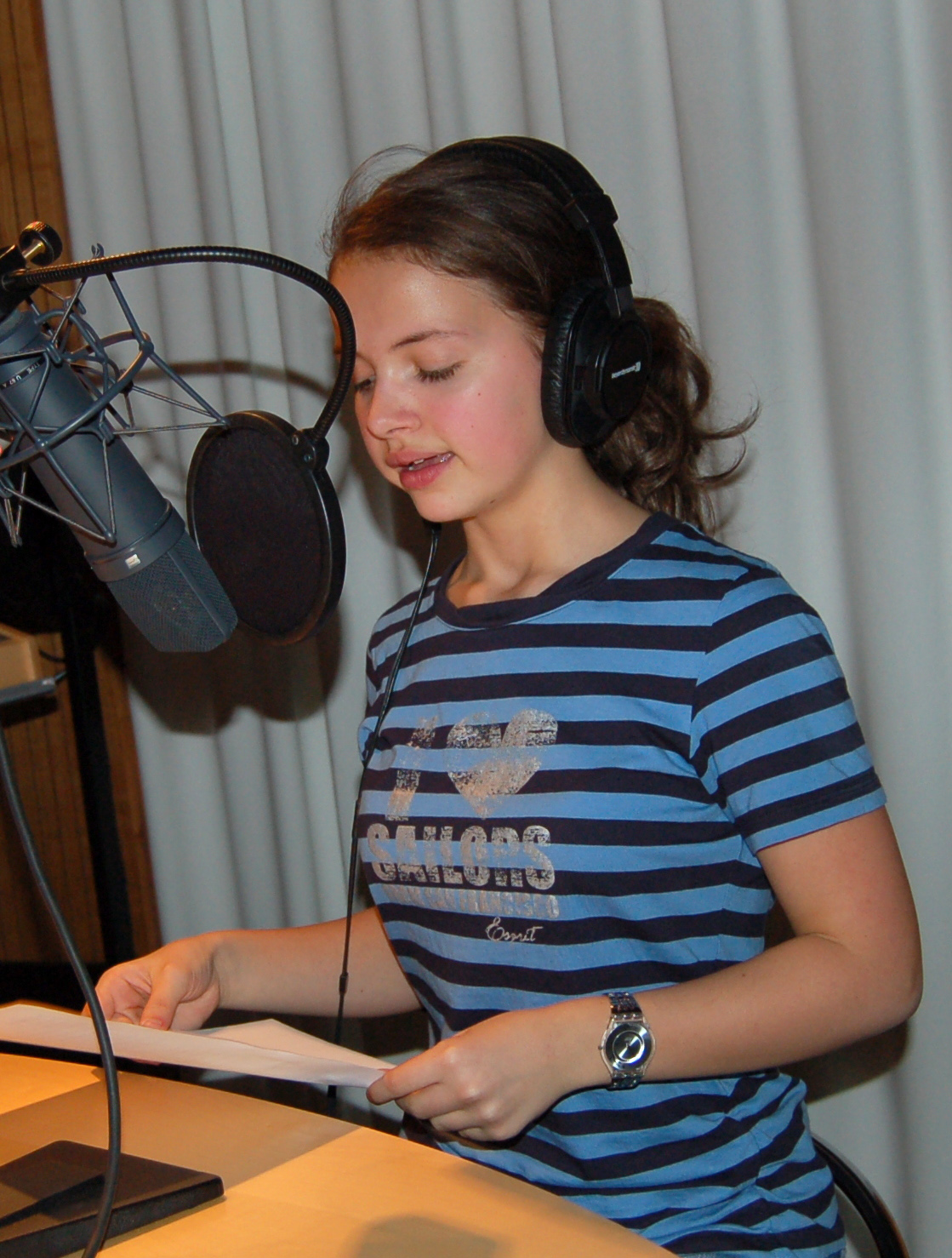
- Morgenstern in 2008
- Born: Marie-Christin Morgenstern; 16 August 1993 (age 32); Potsdam, Germany
- Occupation: Actress
- Relatives: Lydia Morgenstern (sister)

Marie-Christin "Friedel" Morgenstern (born 16 August 1993) is a German voice actress. She has dubbed for more than 300 films in her career spanning from 2005 and has also acted in few films and television series. Her elder sister Lydia Morgenstern is also a voice actress. She adopted using Friedel as the stage name following her breakthrough in her dubbing career.

== Career ==
She began to work as a dubbing artist at the age of nine. She also joined Les Misérables owned Theater des Westens. She has lent voice for popular actresses AnnaSophia Robb and Abigail Breslin in many films during the early part of her career as a dubbing artist. She made her debut as a voice actress at the age of twelve in the 2005 film Charlie and the Chocolate Factory where she dubbed for Abigail Breslin as Violet Brauregard.

She won the German Prize for Synchron for the outstanding young talent of the year in 2007. She received the German Dubbing Award for her dubbing in the 2006 film Little Miss Sunshine where she dubbed for Abigail Breslin.

== Filmography ==
=== Films ===
- Offset (2006)
- Little King Macius (2007) as Kluklu
- Little Big Panda (2011) as Jung Fu
- Monster Family (2017)

=== Selected dubbing works ===
Year	Title	Role
2005	Charlie and the Chocolate Factory	Violet
2006	Grey's Anatomy	Megan Clover
2006	Little Miss Sunshine	Olive Hoover
2007	No Reservations	Zoe
2008	Definitely, Maybe	Maya Hayes
2008	Nim's Island	Nim Rusoe
2009	Zombieland	Little Rock
2009	My Sister's Keeper	Andromeda Fitzgerald
2009	Race to Witch Mountain	Sara
2011	Rango	Priscilla
2011	New Year's Eve	Hailey
2011	Soul Surfer	Bethany Hamilton
2012	Love, Chunibyo & Other Delusions	Rikka Takanashi
2013	The Way, Way Back	Susanna
2015	Maggie	Maggie Vogel
2016	The Forest	Mei
2016	Sleight	Holly
2017	One Percent More Humid	Catherine
2018	Girls with Balls	Lise
2018	The Kissing Booth	Gwyneth
2019	Saving Zoë	Abby
