= Johanna (TV series) =

- Directed by: Peter Hagen
- Starring: Ute Lubosch
- Country of origin: East Germany
- Original language: German
- No. of episodes: 7

Production
- Running time: 60 minutes

Original release
- Network: DDR 1
- Release: September 1 – October 13, 1989

Johanna is an East German television series broadcast in 1989. It stars Ute Lubosch as the titular Berlin tram driver Johanna Rothermund.

== See also ==
- List of German television series
