= Marie Reiners =

Marie Reiners is a German screenwriter and author, as well as the creator of the TV series Mord mit Aussicht and Heiter bis tödlich: Morden im Norden.

== Career ==
Reiners attended the University of Cologne from 1990, where classmate Hella Kemper encouraged her to work as a writer. During her undergraduate degree, Reiners was credited writer for three shows, including Alles Nichts Oder?!. Reiners then wrote for various shows and created the successful satirical crime series Mord mit Aussicht about a police station in the Eifel region.

Reiners first novel, Frauen, die Bärbel heißen (Women called Bärbel), was published in 2019 and tells the story of a 54-year-old taxidermist.

== Filmography ==
Year	Title	Number of episodes	Notes
1990–1992	Alles Nichts Oder?!	9	
1992	Hilde's Wilde Horror Show		Co-writer
1995	Geld oder Liebe	1	
1997	Rendezvous des Todes		Television film
1998	Mobbing Girls	5	
1996–2001	Lukas	58	
2001–2005	Der Ermittler	4	
2002	Der kleine Mönch	6	
2004	Die Sitte / Vice Squad	1	
2005	Unsolved	1	
2005	Die Rosenheim-Cops	2	
2008–2010	Mord mit Aussicht	13	Creator and writer
2011	Prime Time Crime		Television film
2012–2020	Heiter bis tödlich: Morden im Norden	19	
2017–2021	Um Himmels Willen	13	

== Publications ==
- Frauen, die Bärbel heißen (2019, S. Fischer Verlag)
