= Laufenburg =

Laufenburg may refer to:

== Places ==
- Laufenburg, Germany
- Laufenburg, Aargau, a commune of the canton of Aargau, Switzerland
- Laufenburg District, a district of the canton of Aargau, Switzerland

== Family name ==
- Habsburg-Laufenburg

== See also ==
- Laufenberg
