= Theaterhochschule Leipzig =

German theatre school

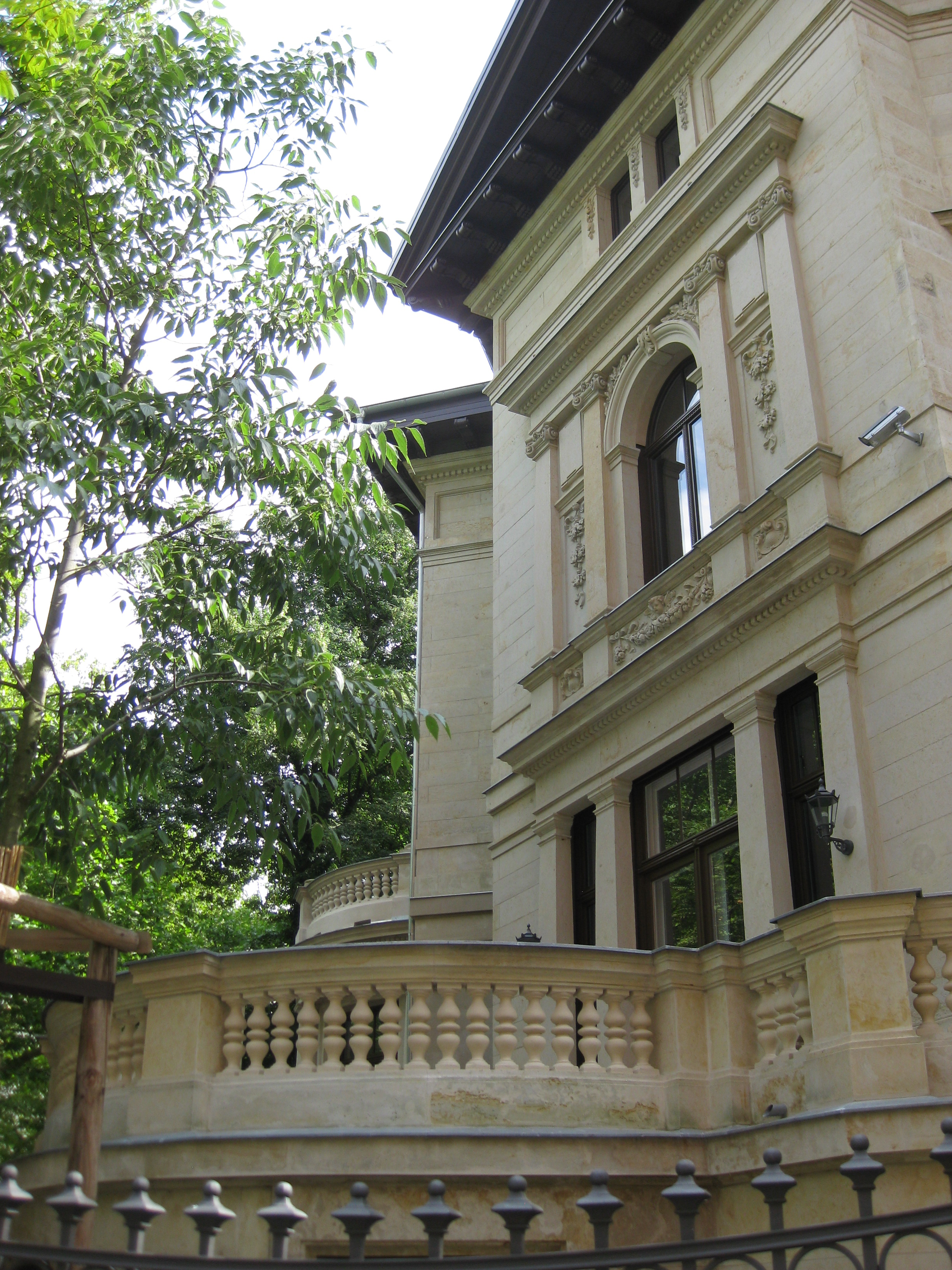
Villa Sieskind, formerly the building of the Theaterhochschule

The Theaterhochschule Leipzig was a theatre school in Leipzig, Saxony, Germany, which existed from 1953 to 1992. The official name was Theaterhochschule "Hans Otto" Leipzig.

== History ==
The Theaterhochschule Leipzig was founded on 1 November 1953 as a merger of two institutions, the Deutsches Theater-Institut in Weimar and the Theaterschule Leipzig. From the late 1960s, Bertolt Brecht was a teacher. In 1967 it was named after the actor Hans Otto whom the Nazis had murdered in 1933. The Hochschule was located at the Villa Sieskind in the Musikviertel and buildings in the neighbourhood.

The institution was dissolved per the Sächsisches Hochschulstrukturgesetz on 10 April 1992. The acting department became a faculty of the Hochschule für Musik und Theater "Felix Mendelssohn Bartholdy", while theatre studies formed a new institute of the Leipzig University.

== Alumni ==
- Eberhard Esche (1933–2006), actor
- Jürgen Holtz (1932–2020), actor on stage and in film, artist and author
- Julia Jäger (born 1970), actress
- Sonja Kehler (1933–2016), actress and chanson singer
- Volkmar Kleinert (born 1938), actor, recitator
- Harry Kupfer (1935–2019), opera director, recipient of the National Prize of the GDR
- Ute Lubosch (born 1953), actress, stage director
- Hans-Peter Minetti (1926–2006), actor
- Ulrich Mühe (1953–2007), actor in film and theatre, Academy Award for Best Foreign Language Film
- Günther Rücker (1924–2008), writer, playwright, film director, recipient of the National Prize of the GDR
- Jörg Schüttauf (born 1961), actor, recipient of the Grimme-Preis
- Peter Sodann (born 1936), actor, stage director, intendant
- Carina Wiese (born 1968), actress
- Monika Woytowicz (born 1944), actress

== Literature ==
- Gerhard Neubauer (ed.): „… dann gehst du aber auf 'ne richtige Schule!“ Fünfzig Jahre Schauspieler-Ausbildung in Leipzig 1953–2003. Hochschule für Musik und Theater „Felix Mendelssohn Bartholdy“, Leipzig 2003.
