= Heiter bis tödlich: Morden im Norden =

- Also known as: Morden im Norden
- Genre: Mystery; Drama; Thriller
- Created by: Marie Reiners
- Starring: Sven Martinek, Marie-Luise Schramm, Tessa Mittelstaedt, Ingo Naujoks
- Country of origin: Germany
- Original language: German
- No. of seasons: 10+
- No. of episodes: 154+

Production
- Running time: 45 minutes

Original release
- Network: Das Erste
- Release: February 23, 2014

Heiter bis tödlich: Morden im Norden (Cheerful 'Till Deadly: Murder in the North) is a German police procedural that has been broadcast by Das Erste since February 2012. The show is set in Lübeck, Germany. The city is a World Heritage Site. The gothic Holstentor is frequently visible.

The series is part of a group of several with similar themes entitled "Heiter bis tödlich."

== Episodes ==
=== Season 1 ===
Number	Episode Title	Broadcast Date
1	Der Marzipanmörder	February 21, 2012
2	Der letzte Gang	February 28, 2012
3	Mann am Spieß	March 6, 2012
4	Donners Dienstreise	March 13, 2012
5	Der Besuch der alten Dame	March 20, 2012
6	Die Nagelprobe	March 27, 2012
7	Ein Fisch namens Otto	April 3, 2012
8	Hals über Kopf	April 10, 2012
9	Der Frauenflüsterer	April 17, 2012
10	Ewige Jagdgründe	April 24, 2012
11	Duft des Todes	May 8, 2012
12	Amsel, Drossel, Fink und Mord	May 15, 2012
13	Tödliche Heilung	May 22, 2012
14	Tod eines Erbsenzählers	May 29, 2012
15	Ein Sarg für zwei	June 5, 2012
16	Das Horn von Lübeck	June 19, 2012

=== Season 2 ===
Number	Episode Title	Broadcast Date
1	Auf der Klippe	April 2, 2013
2	Der Pudelkaiser	April 2, 2013
3	Der Fingerzeig	April 9, 2013
4	Die gute Ute	April 16, 2013
5	Schuss ins Blaue	April 23, 2013
6	Zahr und Zimmermann	May 7, 2013
7	Tod unter Palmen	May 14, 2013
8	Jackpot	May 21, 2013
9	Auge um Auge	Mai 28, 2013
10	Ein Fall mit Überlänge	June 4, 2013
11	Bauernopfer	June 11, 2013
12	Auf Herz und Nieren	June 18, 2013
13	Tödliche Umleitung	June 25, 2013
14	Über Bord	July 2, 2013
15	Die alte Wippe	July 9, 2013
16	Das letzte Lachen	July 16, 2013

=== Season 3 ===
Number	Episode Title	Broadcast Date
1	Der letzte Drink	March 3, 2014
2	Tödliche Tiefe	March 25, 2014
3	Goldfinger	April 1, 2014
4	Der Griff ins Leere	April 8, 2014
5	Blumenopfer	April 15, 2014
6	Fatale Begegnung	April 22, 2014
7	Süße Rache	April 29, 2014
8	Sprengstoff	May 6, 2014
9	Blutgrätsche	November 18, 2014
10	Revolverheld	November 25, 2014
11	Der Nackte und der Tote	December 2, 2014
12	Zivilcourage	December 9, 2014
13	Gevatter Tod	December 16, 2014
14	Ausgekocht	January 6, 2015
15	Die Teufelsinsel	January 13, 2015
16	Tödliche Beobachtung	January 20, 2015

=== Season 4 ===
Number	Episode Title	Broadcast Date
1	Gestrandet	October 31, 2016
2	Ausgeblutet	November 7, 2016
3	Ausgespielt	November 14, 2016
4	Ein dunkles Geheimnis	November 21, 2016
5	Am Limit	November 28, 2016
6	Eiskind	December 5, 2016
7	Im Netz	December 12, 2016
8	Tödliches Vertrauen	January 2, 2017
9	Tödlicher Zweifel	January 9, 2017
10	Kinder des Lichts	January 16, 2017
11	Angst	January 23, 2017
12	Kurzschluss	January 30, 2017
13	Aschenputtel	February 6, 2017
14	Reine Geldgier	February 13, 2017
15	Hass	February 20, 2017
16	Bernsteinfieber	February 27, 2017

=== Season 5 ===
Number	Episode Title	Broadcast Date
1	Liebesblind	April 9, 2018
2	Dunkle Wasser	April 16, 2018
3	Zweite Chance	April 23, 2018
4	Tödliche Mitschuld	April 30, 2018
5	Hinter der Fassade	May 7, 2018
6	Kinderherz	May 14, 2018
7	Kellerkind	May 28, 2018
8	Schwarzer Peter	June 4, 2018
9	Heilende Hände	September 17, 2018
10	Jäger und Sammler	September 24, 2018
11	Der letzte Kuss	October 1, 2018
12	Dornröschen	October 8, 2018
13	Der Tod ist nicht das Ende	October 15, 2018
14	Über den Tod hinaus	October 22, 2018
15	Schwere Zeiten	October 29, 2018
16	Filmriss	November 5, 2018

=== Season 6 ===
Number	Episode Title	Broadcast Date
1	Die verlorene Tochter	September 23, 2019
2	Selbstlos	September 30, 2019
3	Vergiss Mein Nicht	October 7, 2019
4	Falsche Dosis	October 14, 2019
5	Heile Familie	October 21, 2019
6	Wer Hass sät	October 28, 2019
7	Gefangen	November 4, 2019
8	Klassenkampf	November 11, 2019
9	Unter der Haut	November 18, 2019
10	Vollgas	November 25, 2019
11	Leonies letzter Abend	December 2, 2019
12	Aus Liebe	December 9, 2019
13	Herzweh	December 16, 2019
14	Zwischen Leben und Tod	November 2, 2020
15	Bilder des Todes	November 9, 2020
16	Befangen	November 16, 2020

=== Season 7 ===
Number	Episode Title	Broadcast Date
1	Kein Geld der Welt	November 23, 2020
2	Romeo und Julia	November 30, 2020
3	Aus gutem Hause	December 7, 2020
4	Versteckspiel	December 14, 2020
5	Atemnot	December 21, 2020
6	Das Geständnis	December 28, 2020
7	Diva	January 4, 2021
8	Rosenkrieg	January 11, 2021
9	Opfer	January 18, 2021
10	Schuld und Sühne	January 25, 2021
11	Freier Fall	February 1, 2021
12	Mitten ins Herz	February 8, 2021
13	Der Lauf der Welt	February 15, 2021
14	Absturz	February 22, 2021
15	Alte Heimat	March 1, 2021
16	Ausgesetzt	March 8, 2021

=== Season 8 ===
Number	Episode Title	Broadcast Date
1	Wolf	January 10, 2022
2	Ein Schlag zu viel	January 17, 2022
3	Goldener Schuss	January 24, 2022
4	Helfer in der Not	January 31, 2022
5	Bennys Geheimnis	February 7, 2022
6	Schweres Erbe	February 14, 2022
7	Hab mich lieb	February 21, 2022
8	Scharfe Krallen	February 28, 2022
9	Liebeslügen	March 7, 2022
10	Harte Prüfung	March 14, 2022
11	Reifeprüfung	March 21, 2022
12	Perfides Spiel	March 28, 2022
13	Blitzerkrieg	April 4, 2022
14	Beste Freunde	April 11, 2022
15	Vineta	April 25, 2022
16	Tödliche Fracht	May 2, 2022

=== Season 9 ===
Number	Episode Title	Broadcast Date
1	Blutsbande	January 30, 2023
2	Blutspur	February 6, 2023
3	Nur eine Dummheit	February 13, 2023
4	Das schwarze Bild	February 20, 2023
5	Tiefer Fall	February 27, 2023
6	Kleiner Bruder	March 6, 2023
7	Unter Strom	March 13, 2023
8	Harte Kerle	March 20, 2023
9	Das perfekte Opfer	March 27, 2023
10	Gestohlenes Glück	April 3, 2023
11	Abgetaucht	April 17, 2023
12	Entführt	April 24, 2023

=== Season 10 ===
Number	Episode Title	Broadcast Date
1	Der Trupp	January 8, 2024
2	Drei Schwestern	January 15, 2024
3	Merli	January 22, 2024
4	Letzte Lieder	January 29, 2024
5	Vergiftet	February 5, 2024
6	Frauenabend	February 12, 2024
7	Alte Schuld	February 19, 2024
8	Ersatzfamilie	February 26, 2024
9	Unter der Gürtellinie	March 4, 2024
10	Die Tote an Deck	March 11, 2024
11	Keiner von uns	March 18, 2024
12	Verschwunden	March 25, 2024
13	Alles aus Liebe	April 8, 2024
14	Nichts zu verlieren	April 15, 2024
15	Mein Herz schreit	
16	Der tote Clown	

=== Season 11 ===
Number	Episode Title	Broadcast Date
1	Dirk Pientka	January 27, 2025
2	Das Bild eines Jungen	February 3, 2025
3	Die Tote im Zirkus	February 10, 2025
4	Niemandsland	February 17, 2025
5	Nicht mit mir	February 24, 2025
6	Das zweite Alibi	March 3, 2025
7	Nasses Grab	March 10, 2025
8	Das Ende vom Lied	March 17, 2025
9	Raues Klima	March 24, 2025
10	Lebensraum	
11	Vergebung	
12	Gefallene Götter	
13	Verräter	
14	Ruhe sanft	

== Specials ==
Nr.	Originaltitel	Erstausstrahlung D
1	Am Abgrund (90 min.)	January 2, 2024

== See also ==
- List of German television series
