= Valentin Plătăreanu =

Romanian actor (1936–2019)

- Born: Valentin Plătăreanu; November 15, 1936; Bucharest, Romania
- Died: April 16, 2019 (aged 83); Germany
- Burial place: Grădiștea
- Years active: 1958–1980
- Spouse: Doina
- Children: Alexandra Maria Lara

Valentin Plătăreanu (Romanian pronunciation: [valenˈtin plətəˈre̯anu]; 15 November 1936 – 16 April 2019) was a Romanian actor, director and drama teacher.

== Biography ==
From 1958 to 1980, he played more than 30 parts at the Theatre of Youth (Teatrul Tineretului) in Piatra Neamț, then at the National Theatre Bucharest, and has served as their Deputy Director. In 1978–79 he directed Hernani, by Victor Hugo; Much Ado About Nothing, by William Shakespeare; and The Rivals, by Richard Brinsley Sheridan.

=== Personal life ===
In 1983, Plătăreanu left Romania and settled in Germany with his wife, Doina, and his daughter, Alexandra Maria Lara.

=== Acting teacher career ===
In 1992, he founded the Charlottenburg Drama School (Schauspielschule Charlottenburg) with his partner, Henner Oft.

== Movie parts ==
=== Film ===
- Partea ta de vina (1963, Director: Mircea Mureșan) - Popescu
- Răscoala (1965, Director: Mircea Mureșan)
- Serata (1971, Director: Malvina Ursianu) - young man with the grave
- Fratii Jderi (1974, Director: Mircea Drăgan)
- Stephen the Great - Vaslui 1475 (1975, Director: Mircea Drăgan)
- Cursa (1975, Director: Mircea Daneliuc)
- Oil! (1977, Director: Mircea Drăgan) - Ionescu
- Pentru patrie (1977, Director: Sergiu Nicolaescu) - Captain Lahovary
- Războiul independenţei (1977, Director: Sergiu Nicolaescu) - Prince Lahovary
- Din nou împreuna (1978, Director: George Cornea) - Directorul general
- Un om în loden (1979, Director: Nicolae Margineanu)
- Jachetele galbene (1979, Director: Dan Mironescu)
- Santaj (1979, Director: Geo Saizescu)
- Duelul (1979, Director: Sergiu Nicolaescu)
- Ana si hotul (1981, Director: Virgil Calotescu)
- Grabeste-te încet (1981, Director: Geo Saizescu)
- Am o idee (1981, Director: Alecu Croitoru) - Pascu
- Linistea din adîncuri (1982, Director: Malvina Ursianu) - Feciorul
- Totul pentru fotbal (1982, Director: Andrei Blaier)
- O lebada, iarna (1983, Director: Mircea Mureșan)
- The Case of Mr. Spalt (1987, Director: René Perraudin) - Scientist from KGB
- Vorwärts (1990, Director: René Perraudin) - Lawyer
- Mulo (1992, Director: Iva Svarcova)
- Enemy at the Gates (2001, Director: Jean-Jacques Annaud) - General Schmidt (uncredited)
- Berlin Is in Germany (2001, Director: Hannes Stöhr) - Victor Valentin
- Cowgirl (2004, Director: Mark Schlichter) - Gangsterboss im Film Noir
- The Fisherman and His Wife (2004, Director: Doris Dörrie) - Radu
- Offset (2006, Director: Didi Danquart) - Mr. Herghelegiu
- Free Rainer (2007, Director: Hans Weingartner) - Opa Pegah
- Flores (2008, Short, Director: Felix von Boehm) - Gabriel Ramos

=== Television ===
- Schimanski: Asyl · Part: General · Director: Ed. Berger · WDR
- Tatort: "Der Prügelknabe" · Part: Milic · Director: Thomas Jauch · ARD
- Für alle Fälle Stefanie · Part: Herr Marquardt · Director: div. · Sat.1
- Siebenstein · Director: Hans-Henning Borgelt · ZDF
- Tatort · Part: Dr. Salewic · Director: Robert Sigl · SWR
- Ich schenk Dir meinen Mann · Part: Jaruslaw · Director: Karola Hattop · ZDF
- Die 8. Todsünde · Part: Liwinsky · Director: Stefan Meyer · ARD
- Victor Klemperer · Part: Natschew · Director: Kai Wessel · ARD
- Tatort: "Undercover Camping" · Part: Emilio · Director: Jürgen Bretzinger · ARD
- Liebling Kreuzberg · Part: Episode Lead · ARD
- Grosse Freiheit · Director: Robert Sigl
- Death Game · Director: Heinrich Breloer · 2-Teiler · ZDF
