= Mord mit Aussicht =

German crime comedy television series

- Created by: Marie Reiners
- Starring: Caroline Peters; Bjarne Mädel; Meike Droste (de); Katharina Wackernagel; Sebastian Schwarz (de); Jennifer Dickel (de)
- Country of origin: Germany
- Original language: German
- No. of seasons: 4+
- No. of episodes: 45+

Production
- Running time: 50 minutes
- Production company: Pro TV Produktion GmbH (de)

Original release
- Network: Das Erste
- Release: January 7, 2008 – April 12, 2022

Mord mit Aussicht (Murder with a View) is a German satirical crime comedy television series, produced by Pro TV Produktion GmbH and broadcast on Das Erste.
In December 2015, a TV film, Ein Mord mit Aussicht was released after the series ended due to the departure of Bjarne Mädel who plays Dietmar Schäffer.

In 2022 the series was continued with a fourth season featuring a different main cast. Production for a fifth season is scheduled to start in March 2023.

== Plot ==
=== Overview ===
The series follows the adventures of Sophie Haas (played by Caroline Peters), a detective from the city of Köln who had to take a job in the fictional country village of Hengasch (in German this sounds like "hanging butt") in district Liebernich ("rather not"), in the Eifel. Much of the humour of the series derives from clichés of both city and provincial lives, in a similar manner as the English crime series Midsomer Murders, however the content is unlike that of the British programme.

=== Season 1 ===
Sophie Haas, a detective chief from Cologne, has to take the job as head of the police Department in Hengasch. There she meets the village’s two policemen Dietmar Schäffer and Bärbel Schmied. Because there isn’t really happening anything in the village Sophie tries to solve a missing person case which her predecessor Hans Zielonka couldn’t solve — with success. Meanwhile her father Hannes Haas decides to move to Hengasch, too and rents an old forester’s house for the two of them. While trying to solve a murder which happened in a chapel right on the border between North Rhine-Westphalia and Rhineland-Palatinate, she meets Andreas Zielonka, Hans Zielonka’s son, with whom she has to investigate the case. They get closer to each other and are a couple until Andreas has to leave for Canada for further training. Then she has a relationship with Jochen Kauth, the vet, but it breaks, because Sophie doesn’t really want to bond and Jochen is too possessive. Bärbel as well falls in love, with Mathilde (Alwara Höfels), a wandering journeyman carpenter. This confuses her a lot at first because she isn’t a lesbian and she is relieved when she finds out Mathilde likes both men and women as well. However Mathilde has to leave Hengasch soon as she is only passing through. Schäffer and his wife Heike find out that their son Kevin is highly gifted and want to send him to a special boarding school for which he got a scholarship because of that. When a teacher there is murdered, Sophie, Schäffer and Bärbel take over the case. In the series finale, Sophie Haas gets called to Cologne by the superior who relocated her to Hengasch, to end the hostage of an Asian black bear. She also solves an old case and transfers her ex-boyfriend. Thus she gets offered a job in Cologne and Andreas Zielonka who is back from Canada should get her job in Hengasch.

=== Season 2 ===
Just as Sophie wants to move to Cologne, her father gets a heart attack. She discovers that he wanted to move back to Hengasch and has also bought the forester’s house there. In order not to leave Hannes alone, Sophie cancels her promotion and gets back to Hengasch and as well hires the Polish nurse Danuta to take care of him. Dietmar gets confronted with the love of his youth, Katja, which leads to a fight between him and his wife that is present even after Katja has left Hengasch again. Later Dietmar is suspected of having stolen money from the fire station, especially because the money and other stolen things are found in his drawer. However Sophie and he later find out that it’s Bärbel’s new boyfriend who has stolen the money and then smuggled it into Dietmar’s drawer. Sophie starts to see Jochen Kauth again who eventually proposes to her. After some time she says yes. The wedding fails anyway, as the registrar is no one other than the jewel thief known as “Marilyn” whom Sophie hasn’t been able to catch twice before — and she escapes this time, too.

=== Season 3 ===
The wild chase is still going on. Meanwhile Sophie discovers that her father and his now girlfriend Danuta want to move to Kraków and that the forester’s house now is hers and Jochen’s. He however wants to get distance first. The mayor Hans Zwanziger murders his intern Ines because she wanted to blackmail him into getting her a job in Berlin because she knew of an illegal building permission. As his replacement he suggests the previously returned Jan Schulte. Hans Zielonka as well wants to run for the position however doesn’t get as many votes. Meanwhile Dietmar’s mother Irmtraud unsuspectedly shows up which leads to trouble as she tampers into everything. Bärbel has to take over her brother’s milk farm for a while as he is depressive and now in a psychiatric clinic in Bonn. Because of all the stress with the farm and her job, she has a one-night-stand with Timo and gets pregnant. She decides to get the baby, but however to leave Timo. Meanwhile Sophie is starting a relationship with Jan, and Dietmar is afraid that Hans Zielonka might be his father.

=== Film ===
Sophie, Bärbel and Dietmar get called to Hengasch‘s neighbour village because there has been a housebreaking. The owner of the house is the chief of the fifth department in Cologne and has rejected Sophie’s application for a job there. However they don’t find anything stolen. It’s also Dietmar‘s birthday, so they celebrate in the Aubach at night where Sophie gets called by the man to come to his house. Meanwhile Bärbel and Dietmar also arrive there as he has been shot dead, but also the village‘s police who find Sophie with the crime weapon. They, as well as Heike Schäffer who has appeared there, too, get taken to the police office in order to be questioned.

== Cast ==
=== Main ===
- Caroline Peters as Sophie Haas (Season 1–3 & Film)
- Bjarne Mädel as Dietmar Schäffer (Season 1–3 & Film)
- Meike Droste as Bärbel Schmied (Season 1–3 & Film)
- Katharina Wackernagel as Marie Gabler (Season 4–)
- Sebastian Schwarz as Heino Fuß (Season 4–)
- Eva Bühnen as Jennifer Dickel (Season 4–)
- Petra Kleinert as Heike Schäffer
- Michael Hanemann as Hans Zielonka
- Hans Peter Hallwachs as Dr. Hannes Haas (Season 1–3)
- Johann von Bülow as Jan Schulte

=== Recurring ===
- Max Gertsch as Andreas Zielonka
- Kulla Jossifidis as Frau Ziegler
- Patrick Heyn as Dr. Arndt Bechermann
- Arnd Klawitter as Dr. Jochen Kauth
- Friederike Frerichs as Frau Runkelbach
- Julia Schmitt as Lydia Aubach
- Karina Krawczyk as Danuta Kosliki
- Carmen-Maja Antoni as Irmtraud Schäffer

== Episodes ==
Series	Episodes	Premier on Das Erste	
Series	Episodes	Seriespremier	Seriesfinale
1	13	7 January 2008	24 August 2010
2	13	28 August 2012	4 December 2012
3	13	9 September 2014	16 December 2014
TV movie	1	28 December 2015	
4	6	8 March 2022	12 April 2022
5	13	2024	

== Running gags ==
- As a running gag, the old Frau Ziegler, who is almost deaf, is seen every now and then, passing the street with her rollator.
- Dr. Arndt Bechermann, the Gynaecologist and emergency doctor of Hengasch, always diagnoses a heart attack when the cause of death is unclear.

== See also ==
- List of German television series
- Death in Paradise (UK TV series) - which is very similar in format and tone
