= Milan Šamko =

German pianist (1946–2019)

- Born: 27 July 1946; Leipzig, Soviet occupation zone in Germany
- Died: 28 December 2019 (aged 73); Potsdam, Germany
- Occupations: Pianist, keyboardist

Milan Šamko (27 July 1946 – 28 December 2019) was a German pianist and keyboardist. In the 1980s, he became a sought-after studio musician of the GDR.

== Biography ==
Šamko studied piano and composition at the Hochschule für Musik "Hanns Eisler" in Berlin. From the mid-1960s, jazz and blues became more and more a passion for him. He was primarily devoted to playing the music and listening to his favorite classics of Herbie Hancock, Miles Davis, or Keith Jarrett. Samko then advanced through his very own style of writing and improvising as a jazz musician. He has worked as a soloist on the Hammond organ as well as in the radio big band.

In addition to his appearances in bands, since GDR-times to this day, he has frequently accompanied the diseuse Sonja Kehler - both on stage and on record - for a CD with a new Else Lasker-Schüler setting.

Samko, who now lives near Potsdam and teaches piano lessons, has been part of the blues band Passover Blues since the mid-1990s. He also played in the Honky Tonk Duo, with whom he was also to be heard at the Umbria Jazz Festival and he performed with old friends like Wolfgang Zicke Schneider, Konrad Körner, Harro Hübner or Horst "Verti" Melzer.
