= Little Big Panda =

- Poster
- 熊猫总动员
- Directed by: Michael Schoemann; Greg Manwaring
- Screenplay by: Jörg Tensing
- Produced by: Michael Schoemann; Dirk Hampel
- Edited by: Michael Schoemann
- Music by: Jocelyn B. Smith
- Production companies: Magus Entertainment; Benchmark Entertainment; Angels Avenue; Juventy Fims; ORB Filmproduktion; U Film; Beijing Yishang Media Investment; Acció Studios
- Distributed by: China Film Group Corporation (China); NFP Filmverleih (Germany)
- Release dates: 3 February 2011 (China); 23 February 2012 (Germany)
- Running time: 88 minutes
- Countries: China; Germany; Spain; Belgium
- Languages: Mandarin; German; English
- Budget: € 4 million
- Box office: CN¥45.7 million (China)

Little Big Panda (Chinese: 熊猫总动员), (German: Kleiner starker Panda) is a 2011 animated children's family film directed by Michael Schoemann and Greg Manwaring with story by Jörg Tensing. The film is a co-production between China, Germany, Spain and Belgium and follows, a panda cub named Manchu who must convince his family and friends to leave their homes following the deforestation of the bamboo forests in search of a new one.

The film was released in China on 3 February 2011 and 23 February 2012 in Germany

== Storyline ==
Manchu, a young panda in the Chinese highlands. When the survival of Manchu's community is endangered, the pandas find it difficult to react. But Manchu leads the way with the help of his friends Konfusius the red panda and Jung Fu the leopard, and they overcome obstacles like snowy avalanches and unfriendly gorillas. Finding a path through spectacular terrain, the tribe meets both foes and friends until, just as their new destination is in sight, rising water from a new dam blocks the way. Manchu learns how difficult it can be to become a leader. But his triumph over huge odds shows that hope, optimism, friendship, and the will to stand up for what’s right can lead to a brighter future.

== Cast ==
Chinese version:

- He Jiong
- Dinan Chen
- Xie Na
- Weijia Li
- Du Haitao
- Liu Chunyan
- Jing Li
- Zhao Zhongxiang
- Yang Li
- Banyu Shi
- Qiaosheng Han
- Huang Jianxiang
- Weizhi Zhao
- Wu Xin

German version:

- Anna Thalbach as Frau Cheng
- Rainer Gerlach as Ying
- David Kunze as Manchu
- Santiago Ziesmer as Konfusius
- Vivien Gilbert as Chi Chi
- Friedel Morgenstern as Jung Fu

English Version:

- Karen Strassman as Manchu
- Sam Riegel as Kung Fucios
- Cristina Vee as Yung Fu
- Alex Ryan as Ying
- Paige B. Franklin as Mama Chu
- Jessica Straus as Chi Chi
- Jessica Gee as Lung Fu
- Brent Henry as Buddha Bear
- Wendee Lee as Mrs. Cheng
- Michael McConnohie as Mr. Teng
- Max Moran as Hoo Hoo
- Travis Willingham as Brutas
- Joe Cooker as Tyson
- Barbara Goodson as Additional Voices
- Grant George as Additional Voices
- Mari Devon as Additional Voices
- Steve Kramer as Additional Voices
- Steve Pinto as Additional Voices

== Reception ==
The film earned CN¥45.685 million at the Chinese box office.
