= Rosa Roth =

- Starring: Iris Berben
- Country of origin: Germany

Rosa Roth is a German television series. It consisted of 31 television films between 1994 and 2013.

== See also ==
- List of German television series
