= Inka Bach =

German writer

Inka Bach (born 27 April 1956 in East Berlin) is a German writer.

She moved with her family to West Berlin in 1972. After her Abitur in 1974, she studied philosophy and literature at the Free University of Berlin, where she also received an M.S. and a Ph.D. She has worked as a scriptwriter and currently lives with her two children in Berlin.

== Works ==
- Deutsche Psalmendichtung vom 16. bis zum 20. Jahrhundert, Berlin [u.a.] 1989 (with Helmut Galle; Diss. FU Berlin 1987/1988)
- Hesel, Berlin 1992 (with Holzschnitten von Karl Schäfer)
- Pansfüße Berlin 1994 (with Holzschnitten von Karl Schäfer)
- Der Schwester Schatten Berlin 1998
- Hesel Berlin 1998
- Wir kennen die Fremde nicht Rheinsberger Tagebuch, Berlin 2000
- Wer zählt die Opfer, nennt die Namen Berlin 2002 (with Regine Ahrem)
- Bachstelze, Erfurt 2003
- Glücksmarie, Berlin 2004
- Kanzlerinnen, schwindelfrei über Berlin, hrsg. von Corinna Waffender, Berlin 2005
- Der gemeinsame Weg, Berlin 2008
- Der Schwester Schatten. Eine Szenerie nach Trakl, Berlin 2010
- Aufzeichnungen aus dem Untergrund nach Dostojewskij, 2011
- "Schönes Wochenende", Berlin 2012 (with Ingrun Aran)
