= Sonja Kehler =

German actress and chanson singer (1933–2016)

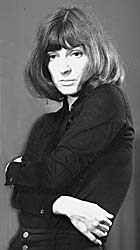
- Kehler in 1974
- Born: 2 February 1933; Haldensleben, Saxony-Anhalt, Germany
- Died: 18 January 2016 (aged 82); Berlin, Germany
- Education: Theaterhochschule Leipzig
- Occupations: Stage actress; Chanson singer; Academic teacher

Sonja Kehler (2 February 1933 – 18 January 2016) was a German actress and chanson singer, known internationally for her interpretation of works by Bertolt Brecht, first playing his characters on the stage, then focused on singing his songs and those of others in solo programs. She taught acting in Danish at the theatre academy in Odense, appeared in films, worked as stage director and presented literary programs.

== Career ==
Born in Haldensleben, Kehler first studied Romance languages, planning to become a theatre critic. When she played a small role in a student theatre project, she was called by the Theaterhochschule Leipzig. She studied acting and performed at several theatres in East Germany, including the role of Luise in Schiller's Kabale und Liebe, Shen Te in Brecht's Der gute Mensch von Sezuan and Grusche in his Der kaukasische Kreidekreis. She also turned to musical theatre as Eliza Doolittle in My Fair Lady and Seeräuber-Jenny in the Dreigroschenoper. She was a member of multiple theatres in Brandenburg and Karl-Marx-Stadt.

The musical parts in Brecht's plays led to her singing chansons, during her student years when she was called "singende Schauspielerin" (the singing actress). She took part in the first chanson competition in the GDR in 1967 and was awarded the special prize "Sonderpreis des Rundfunks".

In 1971 she performed her first Brecht programme, singing settings by Paul Dessau, Hanns Eisler, Tilo Medek and Kurt Weill. Her recordings also appeared in West Germany and internationally. She turned to singing chansons in several languages. Tours took her to Algeria, Austria and most European countries including Belgium, Denmark, England, Finland, France, Italy, Luxembourg, Netherlands, Norway, Portugal, Spain, Sweden and Switzerland.

From the mid-1980s, she taught at the drama school at Odense Teater in Denmark. After gaining fluency in Danish, she performed at Team Teatret, Herning, and Folketeatret, Copenhagen, remaining attached to Denmark for some 30 years. There she is remembered in particular for singing "Den sidste turist i Europa" (The Last Tourist in Europe) in Lars von Trier's film The Element of Crime.

After the German Reunification, she also worked as a stage director at the Exzellenzhaus Trier and presented literary programmes on authors such as Brecht, Kästner, Tucholsky, Ringelnatz, Heinrich Heine and Else Lasker-Schüler, often with the pianist Milan Šamko.

In 1999 she appeared in the film Heroes Like Us after a novel by Thomas Brussig. A CD of song collection was published on the occasion of her 75th birthday, titled Sonja Kehler singt Brecht.

== Selected recordings ==
The German National Library holds several of her recordings:

- Monolog über die Liebe
- Mitternachtstrolleybus (1974)
- Sonja Kehler singt Hanns Eisler (1975)
- So muß es sein, Marie – Neue Lieder mit Sonja Kehler (1976)
- Dessau – Lieder. Sonja Kehler singt Lieder von Paul Dessau nach Texten von Bertolt Brecht (1978)
- Brecht-Portrait (WERGO, 1978)
- Sonja Kehler singt Brecht (1978)
- Geflügelte Sätze. Lieder mit Sonja Kehler (1979)
- Gegen die Phrase, die Langeweile und das allgemeine Geschwätz – Dichtungen von Johannes R. Becher (1980)
- Mitteilung an meine bedrückten Freunde (1982)
- Die Welt ist rund? (1988)
- Helles Schlafen, dunkles Wachen – Else Lasker-Schüler (1998)

CD-compilations:

- Sonja Kehler singt Brecht (CD) (Berlin Classics, 2008) – Recordings 1972–78
- Der Brecht und ich – Hanns Eisler in Gesprächen und Liedern (CD) (Berlin Classics, 2008) – with Sonja Kehler, Ernst Busch, Hanns Eisler and others

== Stage performances ==
- Luise in Kabale und Liebe (Friedrich Schiller) (Theater Neustrelitz, 1959?)
- Katharina in Der Widerspenstigen Zähmung (William Shakespeare) (Theater Neustrelitz, 1959?)
- Shen Te in Der gute Mensch von Sezuan (Bertolt Brecht) (Brandenburger Theater, 1960?)
- Eliza Doolittle in My Fair Lady (Alan Jay Lerner/Frederick Loewe) Karl-Marx-Stadt (Chemnitz, 1961?)
- Jenny in Dreigroschenoper (Bertolt Brecht) Theater Karl-Marx-Stadt (Chemnitz, 1961?)
- Grusche in Der Kaukasische Kreidekreis (Bertolt Brecht)
- Elisabeth in Maria Stuart (Friedrich Schiller) – (Staatstheater Stuttgart?) (Regie Harald Quist)
- Phaedra in Till Fedra (P. O. Enquist) – Stadttheater Klagenfurt (Dir. Alexandra Thaer)
- ShenTe/ShuiTa in Der gute Mensch von Sezuan (Bertolt Brecht) Castrop-Rauxel (Regie Franz Bäck)
- Anna in Die sieben Todsünden der Kleinbürger (Bertolt Brecht) (Kopenhagen) (direction: Morton Grue)
- Dame in Grau Happy end (Brecht/Hauptmann) – (Team Teatret, Herning, Dänemark, 1990) (direction: Sonja Kehler)
