= Laufenberg =

Laufenberg is a surname. Notable people with the surname include:

- Babe Laufenberg, American football player
- Gene Laufenberg, American television writer and producer
- Heinrich Laufenberg, German communist
- Nolan Laufenberg (born 1999), American football player
- Uwe Eric Laufenberg, German actor

== See also ==
- Laufenburg (disambiguation)
