= Der Staatsanwalt hat das Wort =

- Genre: Crime drama
- Country of origin: East Germany (1965–1990); Germany (1990–1991)
- Original language: German
- No. of episodes: 140/143

Original release
- Network: Fernsehen der DDR
- Release: 21 October 1965

Der Staatsanwalt hat das Wort ("The state prosecutor has the floor") was an East German television series.

== See also ==
- List of German television series
