= List of German television series =

The following is a list of television series produced in Germany:

== Current ==
=== Drama ===
- 4 Blocks (TNT Serie, 2017–2019)
- Alarm für Cobra 11 – Die Autobahnpolizei (RTL, 1996–2022)
- Babylon Berlin (Sky 1 & ARD, 2017–present)
- Bad Banks (ZDF & arte, 2018–present)
- Beat (Amazon Prime Video, 2018)
- Bettys Diagnose (ZDF, 2015–present)
- Bonn (Das Erste, 2023–present)
- Das Boot (TV series) (Sky 1, 2018–present)
- Der Bulle und das Biest (Sat.1, 2019–present)
- Charité (ARD, 2017–present)
- Dark (Netflix, 2017–2020)
- Deutsch-les-Landes (Magenta TV, 2018–present)
- Dogs of Berlin (Netflix, 2018–present)
- Einstein (Sat.1, 2017–2019)
- In aller Freundschaft (ARD, 1998–present)
- Leipzig Homicide (ZDF, 2001–present)
- Polizeiruf 110 (Fernsehen der DDR, 1971−1990; ARD, 1990–present)
- SOKO 5113 (ZDF, 1976–2020)
- Tatort (ARD, 1970–present)
- Das Traumschiff (ZDF, 1981–present)
- Um Himmels Willen (ARD, 2002–2021)
- Unorthodox (Netflix, 2020)
- Weissensee (ARD, 2010–2018)
- Wilsberg (ZDF, 1995–present)

=== Comedy ===
- Beck is back! (RTL, 2018–2019)
- Beste Schwestern (RTL, 2018–2019)
- Crime Scene Cleaner (Der Tatortreiniger) (NDR, 2011–present)
- Guten Morgen, Mallorca (RTL, 1996)
- heute-show (ZDF, 2009–present)
- jerks. (Maxdome & ProSieben, 2017–present)
- Der Lehrer (RTL, 2009–2021)
- Magda macht das schon! (RTL, 2016–2021)
- Pastewka (Sat.1, 2005–2014; Amazon Prime Video, 2018–2020)
- Sankt Maik (RTL, 2018–2021)
- Türkisch für Anfänger (ARD Television, 2006–2008)

=== Game shows ===
- Dalli Dalli (ZDF, 1971–1986 and 2011–2015)
- Die Perfekte Minute (Sat 1, 2010–2015)
- Rette die Million! (ZDF, 2010–2013)
- Schlag den Henssler (ProSieben, 2017–2018)
- Schlag den Raab (ProSieben, 2006–2015)
- Schlag den Star (ProSieben, 2009–present)
- Wer wird Millionär? (RTL, 1999–present)
- Wetten, dass..? (ZDF, 1981–2014)
- Am laufenden Band (ARD, 1974−1979)
- Der Große Preis (ARD, 1974−1993)
- Auf Los geht's los (ARD, 1977−1986)

=== Talent shows ===
- Deutschland sucht den Superstar (RTL, 2002–present)
- Germany's Next Topmodel (ProSieben, 2006–present)
- Popstars (RTL 2, 2000−2001; ProSieben 2003–2015)
- Das Supertalent (RTL, 2008–present)
- The Voice of Germany (Sat 1, ProSieben 2011–present)
- X Factor (Germany) (VOX, 2010–2012)

=== News ===
- heute (ZDF, 1963–present)
- heute-journal (ZDF, 1978–present)
- heute-journal up:date (ZDF, 2020–present)
- Punkt 6 (RTL, 1997–2013; 2022–2026)
- Punkt 7 (RTL, 1994–1997; 2022–2026)
- Punkt 8 (RTL, 2022–2026)
- Punkt 9 (RTL, 2000–2013)
- Guten Morgen Deutschland (RTL, 2013–2022)
- Deutschland am Morgen (RTL, n-tv; 2026–present)
- Punkt 12 (RTL, 1992–present)
- RTL aktuell (RTL, 1988–present)
- RTL Nachtjournal (RTL, 1994–present)
- RTLZWEI News (RTLZWEI, 1993 – present)
- Morgenmagazin (ARD, ZDF; 1992–present)
- Mittagsmagazin (ARD, ZDF; 1989–present)
- :newstime (ProSieben, 1989–present; Sat 1, 2023–present; kabel eins, 2023–present)
- Sat.1 Nachrichten (Sat 1, 1985–2023)
- Nachtmagazin (ARD, 1995–present)
- Tagesschau (ARD, 1952–present)
- Tagesthemen (ARD, 1978–present)
- VOX Nachrichten (VOX, 1995–present)
- kabel eins news (kabel eins, 1997–2023)

=== Soap operas ===
- Alles was zählt (RTL, 2006–present)
- Gute Zeiten, schlechte Zeiten (RTL, 1992–present)
- Lindenstraße (ARD, 1985–2020)
- Marienhof (TV series) (ARD, 1992–2011)
- Unter uns (RTL, 1994–present)
- Verbotene Liebe (ARD, 1995–2015)
- Sturm der Liebe (ARD, 2005–present)
- Rote Rosen (ARD, 2006–present)
- Dahoam is dahoam (BR, 2007–present)

== Others ==
=== - ===
- 1, 2 oder 3
- 4 Blocks
- 4 gegen Z
- 6 Richtige
- 18 – Allein unter Mädchen
- 100 Jahre – Der Countdown
- 112 – Sie retten dein Leben
- 0137 (Talkshow)
- 1000 Meisterwerke
- 2000 Jahre Christentum (TV series)

=== A ===
- Abenteuer Airport
- Die Abenteuer der Bremer Stadtmusikanten
- Abramakabra
- Abschnitt 40
- Adelheid und ihre Mörder
- Der Adler – Die Spur des Verbrechens
- Adrian der Tulpendieb
- Die Affäre Semmeling
- Agathe kann's nicht lassen
- Alarm in den Bergen
- The Alaska Kid
- Albert sagt... Natur – aber nur!
- Alfred J. Kwak
- Alisa – Folge deinem Herzen
- Alle lieben Jimmy
- Alle meine Tiere
- Alle meine Töchter
- Alle zusammen – jeder für sich
- Allein gegen die Zeit
- Allein unter Bauern
- Alles Atze
- Alles außer Mord
- Alles außer Sex
- Alles in Ordnung – Mit dem Wahnsinn auf Streife
- Alles was zählt
- Almenrausch und Pulverschnee
- Die Alpenklinik
- Alpha 0.7 – Der Feind in dir
- Alpha Alpha
- Alphateam – Die Lebensretter im OP
- Der Alte
- Am grünen Strand der Spree
- America – The Freedom to Be
- Das Amt
- Anderland
- Der Androjäger
- Angelo und Luzy
- Angie (TV series)
- Anja & Anton
- Anke (TV series)
- Anna (German TV series)
- Anna Maria – Eine Frau geht ihren Weg
- Anna und die Liebe
- Die Anrheiner
- Anwalt Abel
- Die Anwälte
- Archiv des Todes
- Arme Millionäre
- Arpad, der Zigeuner
- Artzooka
- Auf Achse (TV series)
- Auf und davon – Mein Auslandstagebuch
- Aus dem Tagebuch eines Minderjährigen
- Aus heiterem Himmel
- Auto Fritze
- Die Autohändler
- Avanti! Avanti!
- Axel!
- Axel! will's wissen

=== B ===
- Baldur Blauzahn
- Balko
- Die Bambus-Bären-Bande
- Barfuß ins Bett
- Ein Fall für B.A.R.Z.
- Bas-Boris Bode
- Der Bastian
- Ein Bayer auf Rügen
- Bei uns und um die Ecke
- Bella Block
- Bereitschaft Dr. Federau
- Der Bergdoktor
- Der Bergdoktor
- Die Bergwacht
- Berlin Bohème
- Berlin, Berlin
- Berliner Schnauzen
- Berliner Weiße mit Schuß (TV series)
- Bernds Hexe
- Die Bertinis
- Beschlossen und verkündet
- Ein besonderes Paar
- Das Beste aus meinem Leben
- Die Besucher (TV series)
- Bewegte Männer
- Beutolomäus
- Bianca – Wege zum Glück
- Bibliothek der Sachgeschichten
- Die Biene Maja (Anime)
- Bilder, die die Welt bewegten
- Bis in die Spitzen
- Blam! (TV series)
- Blankenese (TV series)
- Blaubär und Blöd
- Blaulicht (TV series)
- Bloch (TV series)
- Bolzplatz-Duell
- Bon Courage
- Böse Mädchen
- Bronski und Bernstein
- Broti & Pacek – Irgendwas ist immer
- Der Bulle von Tölz
- Büro, Büro
- Butler Parker (TV series)

=== C ===
- C'est ça, la vie
- Café Meineid
- Die Camper
- Cartoon
- Cartoon Network Beatbox
- Chronik der Wende
- Clara
- Die Cleveren
- Cliff Dexter
- Der Clown
- Club der roten Bänder
- Cologne P.D.
- Commissario Brunetti
- Commissario Laurenti
- Countdown – Die Jagd beginnt

=== D ===
- Da kommt Kalle
- Dahoam is Dahoam
- Damals in der DDR
- Danni Lowinski
- Das kann ja heiter werden
- Deadline – Jede Sekunde zählt
- Dem Täter auf der Spur
- Derrick
- Detektivbüro Roth
- Deutsch Klasse
- Diamantendetektiv Dick Donald
- Der Dicke
- Der Dicke und der Belgier
- Didi – Der Untermieter
- Die Didi-Show
- Diese Drombuschs
- Dimension PSI
- Doctor Snuggles
- Doctor’s Diary
- Doktor Martin
- Donky von Alpha 6*4
- Donna Leon (TV series)
- Donna Roma
- Doppelter Einsatz
- Dr. Molly & Karl
- Dr. Sommerfeld – Neues vom Bülowbogen
- Dr. Stefan Frank – Der Arzt, dem die Frauen vertrauen
- Dr. Psycho – Die Bösen, die Bullen, meine Frau und ich
- Drehkreuz Airport
- Drei Damen vom Grill
- Drei Dschungeldetektive
- Drei reizende Schwestern
- Die Dreisten Drei
- Dresdner Schnauzen
- Das Duo
- Durch die Nacht mit …

=== E ===
- Edel & Starck
- Ehen vor Gericht
- Ein ehrenwertes Haus
- Eigener Herd ist Goldes wert
- Eight Hours Don't Make a Day
- Ein Fall für die Anrheiner
- Ein Haus in der Toscana
- Eine für alle – Frauen können's besser
- Eine wie keine
- Einmal Prinz zu sein
- Einzug ins Paradies
- Eisbär, Affe & Co.
- Eisenbahn-Romantik
- El tonno
- Elbflorenz (TV series)
- Elefant, Tiger & Co.
- Emm wie Meikel
- Endlich Samstag!
- Engel im Einsatz – mit Verona Pooth
- Das Erbe der Guldenburgs
- Der Ermittler
- Der Eugen
- Eurocops
- Eurogang
- Eva Blond
- Eva – ganz mein Fall

=== F ===
- Fabrixx
- Der Fahnder
- Ein Fall für Stein
- Ein Fall für TKKG
- Ein Fall für zwei
- Der Fall von nebenan
- Die Fallers – Eine Schwarzwaldfamilie
- Familie Bergmann
- Familie Dr. Kleist
- Familie Heinz Becker
- Familie Meier
- Familie Neumann
- Familie Schölermann
- Familie Sonnenfeld
- Die Familienanwältin
- Englisch für Anfänger
- Fast Track English
- Fast wia im richtigen Leben
- Faust
- Felix (miniseries)
- Die Fernfahrer
- Feuerdrachen
- Die Feuerengel
- Das feuerrote Spielmobil
- Die Firma Hesselbach
- Fix und Foxi
- Flash - Der Fotoreporter
- Flax und Krümel
- Flemming (TV series)
- Der fließende Fels
- Flitze Feuerzahn
- Flugstaffel Meinecke
- Der Forellenhof
- Förster Horn
- Forsthaus Falkenau
- Frankensteins Tante (TV series)
- Franzi (TV series)
- Frauenarzt Dr. Markus Merthin
- Freunde (TV series)
- Freunde fürs Leben
- Front ohne Gnade
- Der Fuchs
- Fünf auf dem Apfelstern
- Fünf Freunde (1996)
- Die fünfte Kolonne
- Funkstreife Isar 12
- Für alle Fälle Stefanie
- Der Fürst und das Mädchen
- Fußballtrainer Wulff
- Die Fussbroichs

=== G ===
- Les Gammas! Les Gammas!
- Der ganz normale Wahnsinn
- Gegen den Wind
- Das Geheimnis der Sahara
- Das Geheimnis des Sagala
- Das Geheimnis meiner Familie
- Das Geheimnis meines Vaters
- Geheimprojekt Doombolt
- Die Geissens – Eine schrecklich glamouröse Familie
- Geld.Macht.Liebe
- Geliebte Schwestern
- Geschichten aus der Heimat
- Geschichten übern Gartenzaun
- Die Gespenster von Flatterfels
- Gestatten, mein Name ist Cox
- Gipfeltreffen
- Giraffe, Erdmännchen & Co.
- Girl friends – Freundschaft mit Herz
- Gisbert (TV series)
- Die glückliche Familie (TV series)
- Gott sei dank … dass Sie da sind!
- Graf Yoster gibt sich die Ehre
- Die Grashüpfer (TV series)
- Die Graslöwen
- Die großen Kriminalfälle
- Großstadtrevier
- Großstadtträume
- GSG 9 – Ihr Einsatz ist ihr Leben
- Guten Morgen, Mallorca

=== H ===
- Hablamos Español
- Hafenpolizei
- Hallo Robbie!
- Hallo Spencer
- Hallo Taxi (TV series)
- Hallo, Onkel Doc!
- Hals über Kopf
- Hamburg Transit
- Die Hammer-Soap – Heimwerker im Glück
- Hand aufs Herz
- Hanna – Folge deinem Herzen
- Hans im Glück aus Herne 2
- Happy Holiday
- Das Haus der Krokodile
- Das Haus mit der Nr. 30
- Ein Haus voller Töchter
- Der Hausgeist
- Hausmeister Krause – Ordnung muss sein
- Die Hausmeisterin
- Der Havelkaiser
- Headnut.tv
- Heidi und Erni
- Der Heiland auf dem Eiland
- Ein Heim für Tiere
- Helden der Kreisklasse
- Helga und die Nordlichter
- HeliCops – Einsatz über Berlin
- Ein Herz und eine Seele
- Herzflimmern – Die Klinik am See
- Die Hesselbachs
- Hessische Geschichten
- Hexe Lilli (TV series)
- Hilfe! Hochzeit! – Die schlimmste Woche meines Lebens
- Hilfe, meine Familie spinnt
- Hinter Gittern – Der Frauenknast
- Hotel Elfie
- Hotel Paradies
- Hundkatzemaus
- Hurra Deutschland
- Die Hydronauten

=== I ===
- Ich bin Boes
- Ich heirate eine Familie
- Ihr Auftrag, Pater Castell
- Ijon Tichy: Raumpilot
- Im Angesicht des Verbrechens
- Im Namen des Gesetzes
- Im Tal der wilden Rosen
- Immenhof (TV series)
- Immer wieder Sonntag
- In aller Freundschaft
- Insel der Träume (TV series)
- Inspector Hornleigh Intervenes
- Inspektor Rolle
- I.O.B. Spezialauftrag
- Irgendwie und Sowieso

=== J ===
- Jabhook
- Jack Holborn
- Jakob und Adele
- Janna (TV series)
- Janoschs Traumstunde
- Jasper, der Pinguin
- Jede Menge Leben
- JETS – Leben am Limit
- Jim Knopf
- Johanna (TV series)
- John Klings Abenteuer
- Jokehnen
- Jolly Joker
- JoNaLu
- Das Jugendgericht
- Julia – Eine ungewöhnliche Frau
- Julia – Wege zum Glück
- Junger Herr auf altem Hof

=== K ===
- K11 – Kommissare im Einsatz
- K3 – Kripo Hamburg
- Der Kaiser von Schexing
- Kanzleramt (TV series)
- Der Kapitän
- Käpt'n Blaubär Club
- Kara Ben Nemsi Effendi
- Die Karte mit dem Luchskopf
- Das große Abenteuer des Kaspar Schmeck
- Kater Mikesch
- Katrin ist die Beste
- Katrin und die Welt der Tiere
- KDD – Kriminaldauerdienst
- Kiezgeschichten
- Die Kinder vom Alstertal
- Kinder, Kinder
- Kir Royal (TV series)
- Eine Klasse für sich (TV series)
- Der kleine Doktor
- Der kleine Mann
- Der kleine Mönch
- Der kleine Ritter Trenk
- Der kleine Vampir – Neue Abenteuer
- Der kleine Vampir (1985)
- Klemperer – Ein Leben in Deutschland
- Kli-Kla-Klawitter
- Klimawechsel
- Klimbim
- Klinik am Alex
- Klinik unter Palmen
- Klinikum Berlin Mitte – Leben in Bereitschaft
- Knallerfrauen
- Knallerkerle
- Die Knapp-Familie
- Die Komiker
- Kommissar Beck – Die neuen Fälle
- Kommissar Brahm
- Kommissar Freytag
- Kommissar LaBréa
- Der Kommissar und das Meer
- Der Kommissar
- Kommissarin Lucas
- Die Kommissarin
- Der Komödienstadel
- König von Kreuzberg
- Der König
- Königlich Bayerisches Amtsgericht
- Korkmazlar
- Körner und Köter
- Kreuzfahrt ins Glück
- KRIMI.DE
- Der Kriminalist
- Das Kriminalmuseum
- Kripo live
- Krügers Woche
- KTI – Menschen lügen, Beweise nicht
- Kümo Henriette
- Der Kurier der Kaiserin
- Die Küstenpiloten
- Küstenwache (TV series)

=== L ===
- Ladykracher
- Ladyland
- Der Landarzt
- Landarzt Dr. Brock
- Die Landärztin
- Der lange Weg des Lukas B. (TV series)
- Lasko – Die Faust Gottes
- Laura und Luis
- Lauras Stern
- Le petit gnome
- Leben für die Liebe (see also Tessa – Leben für die Liebe)
- Der Lehrer
- Leipzig Homicide
- Lena – Liebe meines Lebens
- Lenßen & Partner
- Leopard, Seebär & Co.
- Les années lycée
- Der letzte Bulle
- Der letzte Zeuge
- Die Leute vom Domplatz
- Leute wie du und ich
- Lexx – The Dark Zone
- Liebe, Babys und ein großes Herz
- Die lieben Verwandten
- Liebling Kreuzberg
- Lilalu im Schepperland
- Liste der Willkommen bei Mario Barth-Episoden
- Little Amadeus
- Lokaltermin (TV series)
- Lotta in Love
- Löwengrube – Die Grandauers und ihre Zeit (TV series)
- Löwenzahn
- Die Ludolfs – 4 Brüder auf'm Schrottplatz
- Lukas (TV series)
- Lukas und Sohn
- Lutter (TV series)

=== M ===
- Die Mädchen aus dem Weltraum
- Maddin in Love
- Mallorca – Suche nach dem Paradies
- Mammutland
- Mandara (TV series)
- Ein Mann am Zug
- Der Mann ohne Schatten
- Die Männer vom K3
- Manni, der Libero
- Maple Avenue
- Märchen der Völker
- Märchen der Welt – Puppenspiel der kleinen Bühne
- Marco – Über Meere und Berge
- Mario (TV series)
- Matt in 13 Zügen (TV series)
- Max Wolkenstein
- Medicopter 117 – Jedes Leben zählt
- Mein Freund Winnetou
- Mein Leben & Ich
- Mein neuer Freund
- Meine schönsten Jahre
- Meine wunderbare Familie
- Meister Eder und sein Pumuckl (TV series)
- Melodien der Berge
- Mensch Bachmann
- Mensch Markus
- Mensch, Pia!
- Die merkwürdige Lebensgeschichte des Friedrich Freiherrn von der Trenck
- Merlin (TV series)
- M.E.T.R.O. – Ein Team auf Leben und Tod
- Michel aus Lönneberga (TV series)
- Der Millionenbauer
- Der Millionenerbe
- Mission Terra
- Mit einem Bein im Grab
- Mit Herz und Handschellen
- Mit Leib und Seele
- Mitten im Leben (comedy TV series)
- Mitten im Leben (reality TV series)
- Mitten in Europa – Deutsche Geschichte
- Molle mit Korn
- Momo
- Monaco Franze – Der ewige Stenz
- Mond Mond Mond
- Die Montagsfamilie
- Monty Python's Fliegender Zirkus
- Mord in bester Gesellschaft
- Mord mit Aussicht
- Mordkommission Istanbul
- Morgen schon
- Moselbrück
- Motiv Liebe
- Motzki
- MS Franziska
- Mummy Nanny
- München 7
- Münchener Freiheit (TV series)

=== N ===
- Naked & Funny
- Nashorn, Zebra & Co.
- Nesthäkchen (TV series)
- Nesthocker – Familie zu verschenken
- Die Neue – Eine Frau mit Kaliber
- Neues aus Büttenwarder
- Neues aus Uhlenbusch
- Neues vom Süderhof
- Nicht von dieser Welt (TV series)
- Nicht von schlechten Eltern
- Nick & Perry
- Niedrig und Kuhnt – Kommissare ermitteln
- NightWash
- Nikola (TV series)
- Ninas Welt
- Nonni und Manni
- Notarztwagen 7
- Notruf Hafenkante
- Nürnberger Schnauzen

=== O ===
- Offroad.TV
- Oh Gott, Herr Pfarrer
- Oliver Maass
- Olm unterwegs
- OP ruft Dr. Bruckner
- Ostsee-Schnauzen
- Otto – Die Serie
- Die Özdags

=== P ===
- Pagten
- Panda, Gorilla & Co.
- Papageien, Palmen & Co.
- Parkhotel Stern
- Parole Chicago
- Pastewka (TV series)
- Patrik Pacard
- Percy Stuart
- Perfect Disaster
- Peter ist der Boss
- Peter Steiners Theaterstadl
- Peter Strohm
- Peter und Paul
- Pfarrer Braun
- Die Pfefferkörner
- Der Pfundskerl
- Pinguin, Löwe & Co.
- Planète Némo
- Playtime (Sprachkurs)
- Plötzlich Papa – Einspruch abgelehnt!
- Pogo 1104
- Polizeifunk ruft
- Polizeiinspektion 1
- Polizeiruf 110
- Post Mortem
- Praktikanten - Jimi und Mitja machen den Jobcheck
- Praxis Bülowbogen
- Der Prins muß her
- Der Prinz von Pumpelonien
- PS (TV series)
- Die Pulvermänner
- Pumuckls Abenteuer

=== Q ===
- Quentin Durward (TV series)

=== R ===
- Ralphi – Der Schlaubär aus der Augsburger Puppenkiste
- Rappelkiste
- Das Rätsel der Sandbank
- Raumpatrouille
- Raumstation Unity
- Ravioli (TV series)
- Das Recht zu lieben
- Regina auf den Stufen
- Reläxx
- Rentner haben niemals Zeit
- Reporter (TV series)
- Die Rettungsflieger
- R. I. S. – Die Sprache der Toten
- Ritas Welt
- Rivalen der Rennbahn
- Robbi, Tobbi und das Fliewatüüt
- Ron und Tanja
- Roncalli (TV series)
- Rosa Roth
- Die Rosen von Dublin
- Die Rosenheim-Cops
- Rote Bergsteiger (TV series)
- Rote Erde (TV series)
- Die rote Kapelle
- Die Rote Meile
- Rote Rosen
- Die rote Zora und ihre Bande (TV series)
- RTL Samstag Nacht
- Die Rückkehr des Sandokan
- Rußige Zeiten

=== S ===
- Sabine (TV series)
- Salto Kommunale
- Salto Mortale (TV series)
- Salto Postale
- Samt und Seide
- Unser Sandmännchen
- Sandokan – Der Tiger von Malaysia
- Sauerkraut (Helme Heine)
- Der Schatz im All
- Der Schatz im Niemandsland
- Schicksale - und plötzlich ist alles anders
- Ein Schloß am Wörthersee
- Schloss Einstein
- Schloß Hohenstein (TV series)
- Schloß Pompon Rouge
- Schlupp vom grünen Stern
- Schmetterlinge im Bauch
- Die schnelle Gerdi
- Schuld nach Ferdinand von Schirach
- Die Schule am See
- Die Schule der kleinen Vampire
- Schulmädchen
- Der Schwammerlkönig
- Schwarz greift ein
- Schwarz Rot Gold
- Die schwarzen Brüder
- Die Schwarzwaldklinik
- Die sechs Siebeng'scheiten
- Sechserpack
- Seehund, Puma & Co.
- Die seltsamen Methoden des Franz Josef Wanninger
- Sender Nordlicht
- Die Sendung mit dem Elefanten
- Die Sendung mit der Maus
- Sergeant Berry (TV series)
- Sesamstraße
- Sie kommen aus Agarthi
- Silas
- Simsala Grimm
- Sinan Toprak ist der Unbestechliche
- Siska
- Die Sitte
- SK Kölsch
- SK-Babies
- Skippy der Buschpilot
- DIE SNOBS - Sie können auch ohne Dich
- So ist das Leben! Die Wagenfelds
- SOKO 5113
- SOKO Rhein-Main
- SOKO Wismar
- Solo für Sudmann
- Sonderdezernat K1
- Der Sonne entgegen
- Sophie – Braut wider Willen
- Der Spatz vom Wallrafplatz
- Sperling (TV series)
- Das Spielhaus (DDR)
- Spreepiraten
- Spuk am Tor der Zeit
- Spuk aus der Gruft
- Spuk im Reich der Schatten
- St. Angela
- Der Staatsanwalt hat das Wort
- Staatsanwalt Posch ermittelt
- Stadt, Land, Mord!
- Stadtklinik
- Stahlkammer Zürich
- Stahlnetz
- Starke Herzen
- Ein starkes Team
- Die Stein
- Sterne des Südens
- Sternenfänger
- Sternensommer
- Stolberg (TV series)
- Die Strandclique
- Die Straßen von Berlin
- Stromberg
- Stubbe – Von Fall zu Fall
- Ein Stück Himmel
- Stülpner-Legende
- Sturm der Liebe
- Stuttgart Homicide
- Sylter Geschichten
- Sylvia – Eine Klasse für sich

=== T ===
- Tabaluga
- Ein Tag schreibt Geschichte
- Tagebuch einer Gänsemutter
- Talk op Platt
- Tanja (TV series)
- Tanzalarm
- Tapetenwechsel (TV series)
- Tatort
- Tatort Internet
- Tegtmeier klärt auf!
- Tegtmeiers Reisen
- Telematch
- Telerop 2009 – Es ist noch was zu retten
- Terra X: Schliemanns Erben
- Tessa – Leben für die Liebe (see also Leben für die Liebe)
- Teufels Großmutter
- Tierarzt Dr. Engel
- Tiere bis unters Dach
- Tierisch Kölsch
- Tierärztin Dr. Mertens
- Till, der Junge von nebenan
- Timm Thaler (1979 TV miniseries)
- Timm Thaler (2002 TV series)
- Tod eines Schülers
- Der Tod ist kein Beinbruch
- Tolle Trolle
- Tom und das Erdbeermarmeladebrot mit Honig
- Die Torpiraten
- Total Genial
- Total Normal
- Transporter - Die Serie
- Das Traumhotel
- Das Traumschiff
- Treffpunkt Flughafen
- Paul Trimmel
- Die Trotzkis
- Türkisch für Anfänger
- Twipsy
- Two Funny
- Typisch Sophie

=== U ===
- Üb immer Treu nach Möglichkeit
- Ulmens Auftrag
- Um Himmels Willen
- Und tschüss!
- Unschuldig
- Unser Charly
- Unser Lehrer Doktor Specht
- Unser Walter
- Unsere Farm in Irland
- Unsere schönsten Jahre
- Das unsichtbare Visier
- Unter den Linden – Das Haus Gravenhorst
- Unter einem Dach
- Unter einer Decke
- Unter Verdacht (TV series)
- Unter weißen Segeln
- Unterwegs nach Atlantis (TV series)
- Die Unverbesserlichen
- USA & Canada - The freedom to be...

=== V ===
- Vater Seidl und sein Sohn
- Vater wider Willen
- Die Verbrechen des Professor Capellari
- Verliebt in Berlin
- Verrückt nach Clara
- Ein verrücktes Paar
- Verschollen
- Viens jouer avec nous
- Die Viersteins
- Vom Webstuhl zur Weltmacht
- Von Null auf 42

=== W ===
- Die Wache
- Die Wächter
- Wartesaal zum kleinen Glück
- Was nicht passt, wird passend gemacht (TV series)
- Wege zum Glück
- Weissensee (TV series)
- Weißblaue Geschichten
- Westerdeich
- Western von gestern
- Die Wicherts von nebenan
- Wie erziehe ich meine Eltern?
- Wie gut, dass es Maria gibt
- Wie schlau ist Deutschland?
- Die Wiesingers
- Wildbach (TV series)
- Willkommen bei Mario Barth
- Willkommen in der Nachbarschaft
- Willi wills wissen
- Wilsberg
- Die Wilsheimer
- WinneToons
- Wir Deutschen
- Wohnen nach Wunsch
- Wolf, Bär & Co
- Wolffs Revier

=== Z ===
- Zack! Comedy nach Maß
- Zahn um Zahn (TV series)
- Zeit genug
- Zentrale Bangkok
- Zuhause im Glück – Unser Einzug in ein neues Leben
- Zum Stanglwirt
- Zur Freiheit
- Zur See
- Zwei am großen See
- Zwei Ärzte sind einer zu viel
- Zwei Brüder
- Zwei himmlische Töchter
- Zwei Münchner in Hamburg
- Zwei Supertypen in Miami
