= Elefant, Tiger & Co. =

- Genre: Zoo Docusoap
- Created by: Jan Tenhaven and Axel Friedrich
- Starring: Christian Steyer
- Country of origin: Germany
- Original language: German
- No. of seasons: 10
- No. of episodes: 673+

Production
- Running time: 25 minutes

Original release
- Network: Mitteldeutscher Rundfunk
- Release: 1 April 2003

Elefant, Tiger & Co. (English: Elephant, Tiger & Co.) is a German television series from the Central German Broadcasting (Mitteldeutschen Rundfunk) which has been aired since 1 April 2003. It is considered to be the most successful German zoo docusoap. Its setting is Leipzig Zoological Garden.

== Content ==
In the series the everyday life of zoo animals is described, as well as the work of the zookeepers, curators, and veterinary physicians. For example, the development of the small Angola lion Malik, the rehearsals for the advertising appearance of llama Horst and alpaca Harry, as well as the animals moving into the newly built Gondwanaland.

In 2010 and 2011, Virginia opossum Heidi, who has died in the meantime and was part of the cast, had a show on the Internet dedicated to her.

== Background ==
From 5 March 2002 the MDR showed 15-minute-episodes of "elephant, tiger and Co." with the second title "Tierzulande" in the series "this country" at 9:30 pm. In total, 12 episodes were aired, beginning with the episode "Operation day in the Zoo" and produced by DocStation (book/Director: Katrin peoples, Marcus otter). Due to immense popularity the MDR took over the series themselves and aired it from 1 April 2003 independently.

By including the zookeepers' personalities in the concept and the plot of the series, the series is considered a pioneer in the field of zoo docusoaps. The success of elephant and tiger & Co. exceeded the expectations of both the MDR and the zoo. There have now been more than 670 episodes produced and broadcast.

In the beginning 15-minute, later 25-minute episodes were produced for the Central German Radio . For the afternoon program of "Das Erste" repeats of the television series were cut into 45-minute blocks. The broadcast of the first season was watched by an average of 1.93 million viewers. The second season, which was broadcast from 27. December 2006 to 5. April 2007, reached an average of 2.64 million viewers.

The serial was developed substantially by the two TV writers Jan Tenhaven and Axl Friedrich. By now, there are nine other authors responsible: Jens Straw Schieder, Kerstin Holl, Antje Schneider, Eva Demmler, Lutz Tauscher, Stefanie Wagemann, Christiane Probst, Beate Gerber and Melanie Henze. Speaker and – in special programs – intermittent actor is the musician and actor Christian Steyer. His substitute is the radio drama actor Uve Teschner.

== More zoo docusoaps ==
In the footsteps of the idea for Elephant, Tiger & Co. more zoo docusoaps were created, such as Pinguin, Löwe & Co. from Münster Zoo, and Panda, Gorilla & Co. from Tierpark Berlin and Berlin Zoological Garden. More spin-off series followed and the ZDF also broadcast similar series using titles such as Berliner Schnauzen from the Berlin Zoological Garden and Tierisch Kölsch from Cologne Zoo. In reaction to these many spin-offs the closing title Elephant, Tiger & Co. – The Original was added to the credits.

In the speech held for the opening of the new elephants' enclosure at Leipzig zoo in March 2006, Bernhard Blaszkiewitz, previous director of Tierpark Berlin, stressed the use of all zoos in this broadcasting format, while demanding that "more information should be provided again in such series".

Another series from the ARD, which is also set in Leipzig Zoo, although with a fictional plot, is Tierärztin Dr. Mertens.

== See also ==
- List of German television series
