= Oliver Petszokat =

German singer and actor

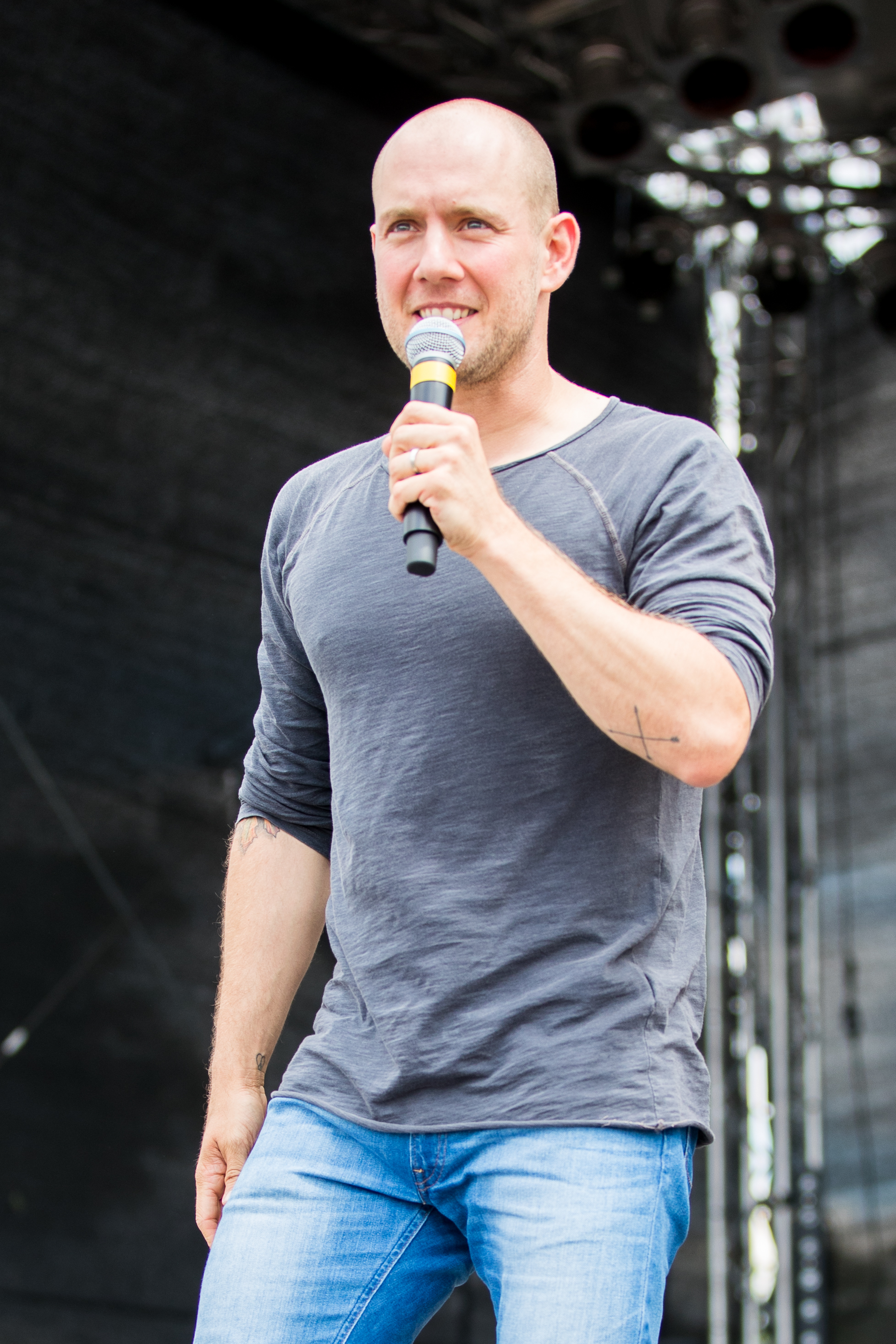
- Oli.P in 2016
- Born: Oliver Alexander Reinhard Petszokat; 10 August 1978 (age 47); West Berlin, West Germany
- Other names: Oli.P
- Occupation(s): Singer, actor, TV presenter
- Years active: 1996–present

Oliver Alexander Reinhard Petszokat (born 10 August 1978), better known by his stage name Oli.P, is a German singer, actor and television presenter.

== Biography ==
Petszokat, whose father Reinhard Petszokat was a policeman, began ballroom dancing at the age of ten. His biggest dance success was in 1995 as a participant in the winning team for the Youth Cup team of the Dance Sport Federation of North Rhine-Westphalia eV.

In Germany, Petszokat became famous as pop singer Oli.P. On German broadcaster RTL, he played character Ricky Marquart in the television series Gute Zeiten, schlechte Zeiten. In several television shows he worked as television presenter (Big Brother, ...).

In 1999, Petszokat married German actress Tatiani Katrantzi. Together they have one child. In 2007, the couple separated.

== Awards ==
- 1998: Bravo Otto
- 1999: Bravo Otto
- 2000: Echo

== Discography ==
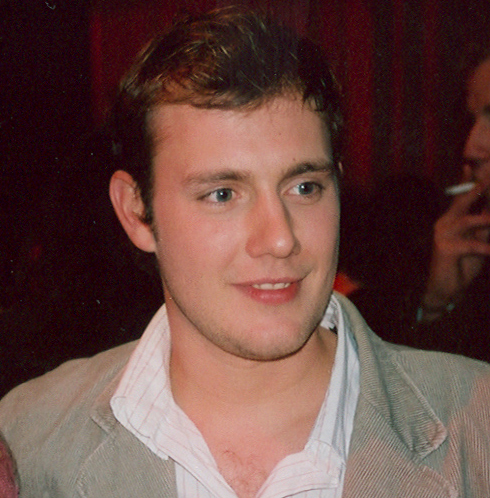
Oli.P in 2004

(as Oli.P)

=== Albums ===
Studio albums

- 1998: Mein Tag
- 1999: o.ton
- 2001: P.ulsschlag
- 2002: Startzeit
- 2004: Freier Fall
- 2016: Wie früher
- 2019: Alles Gute!

Compilation albums

- 2002: Lebenslauf – Gold & Platin 98-01

=== Singles ===
- 1997: "Liebe machen"
- 1998: "Flugzeuge im Bauch" #1 (7 weeks, DE) #1 (6 weeks, AT), #1 (CH)
- 1998: "I Wish" #2 (DE), #3 (AT), #7 (CH)
- 1999: "Der 7. Sinn" #66 (DE)
- 1999: "So bist du (und wenn du gehst...)" #1 (5 weeks, DE), #1 (3 weeks, AT), #1 (CH)
- 2000: "Niemals mehr" #23 (DE)
- 2000: "Plötzlich stand sie da"
- 2001: "Girl You Know It's True" #17 (DE), #40 (AT)
- 2001: "When You Are Here" #45 (DE)
- 2002: "Das erste Mal tat's noch weh" #15 (DE), #15 (AT), #15 (CH)
- 2002: "Nothing's Gonna Change My Love for You" #30 (DE), #46 (AT)
- 2003: "Alles ändert sich (alles oder nichts)" #33 (DE)
- 2003: "Neugeboren"
- 2004: "Engel" / "Unsterblich"
- 2016: "Wie früher"
- 2016: "Wohin gehst du"
- 2019: "Flugzeuge im Bauch (2K19)"
- 2019: "Lieb mich ein letztes Mal"
- 2019: "Hallo Schatz"

== Filmography ==
=== TV series ===
- 1996–1997: Alle zusammen – jeder für sich (230 episodes)
- 1998–1999: Gute Zeiten, schlechte Zeiten (480 episodes)
- 1999: Hinter Gittern – Der Frauenknast (4 episodes)
- 2002: Der kleine Mönch (7 episodes)
- 2004: Wie erziehe ich meine Eltern? (1 episode)
- 2004: Im Namen des Gesetzes (1 episode)
- 2005: Axel! will's wissen (1 episode)
- 2006–2007: Gott sei dank … dass Sie da sind! (6 episodes)
- 2010–2011: Hand aufs Herz (234 episodes)
- 2015: Die tierischen 10 (VOX)
- 2016: Rote Rosen (ARD)

=== Films ===
- 2000: Girl Friday
- 2001: Girl
- 2003: Baltic Storm
- 2003: Motown
- 2005: Ein Hund, zwei Koffer und die ganz große Liebe
- 2007: Die ProSieben Märchenstunde: Dörnröschen – ab durch die Hecke
- 2008: Funny Movie – Dörtes Dancing
