= Thomas Engel (director) =

German screenwriter & director (1922–2015)

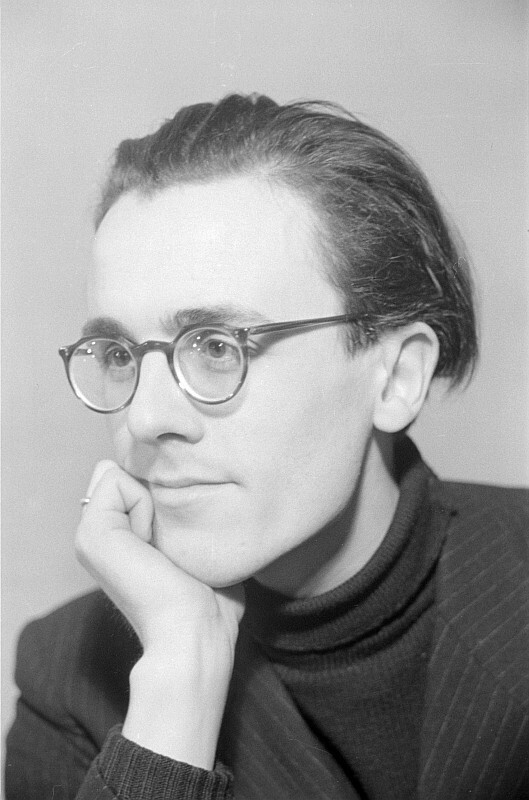
- Abraham Pisarek, 1947
- Born: 18 April 1922; Hamburg, Germany
- Died: 7 May 2015 (aged 93); Kreuth, Bavaria, Germany
- Occupations: Director, writer
- Years active: 1953–1992 (film & TV)

Thomas Engel (April 18, 1922– May 7, 2015) was a German screenwriter and director of film and television. He was the son of director Erich Engel.

== Selected filmography ==
- Annaluise and Anton (1953) — based on the eponymous novel by Erich Kästner
- Girl with a Future (1954)
- Bon Voyage (1954) — based on Eduard Künneke's operetta Glückliche Reise
- Swedish Girl (co-director: Håkan Bergström, 1955)
- Liebe, die den Kopf verliert (1956)
- Die Stimme der Sehnsucht (1956)
- Nichts als Ärger mit der Liebe (1956) — based on the play The Concert by Hermann Bahr
- Wie schön, daß es dich gibt (1957)
- Junger Mann, der alles kann (1957) — based on a novel by Ernst Rudolphi
- Der Page vom Palast-Hotel (1958) — based on a novel by Maria von Peteani
- Mylord weiß sich zu helfen (1958, TV film) — based on the story Lord Arthur Savile's Crime by Oscar Wilde
- Der lachende Vagabund (1958)
- Liebe auf krummen Beinen (1959) — based on a novel by Hans Gruhl
- The Blue Sea and You (1959)
- I Learned That in Paris (1960)
- Gauner-Serenade (1960)
- Wie einst im Mai (1961, TV film) — based on Walter Kollo's operetta Wie einst im Mai
- Davon träumen alle Mädchen (1961)
- Lauter Lügen (1961, TV film) — Remake of the films All Lies (1938) and Must We Get Divorced? (1953)
- Schlagerrevue 1962 (1961)
- So war Mama (1962, TV film) — based on the play I Remember Mama by John Van Druten and Kathryn Forbes
- Im echten Manne ist ein Kind (1962, TV series)
- Ihr gehorsamer Diener (1962, TV film) — based on the play Your Obedient Servant by Diana Morgan and Dorothea Gotfurt
- Sein Meisterstück (1963, TV film) — based on the play Savez-vous planter les choux by Marcel Achard
- Kater Lampe (1963, TV film) — based on the play Kater Lampe by Emil Rosenow
- The Nylon Noose (1963)
- Meine Tochter und ich (1963) — screenplay by Curth Flatow
- Glückliche Reise (1963, TV film) — based on Eduard Künneke's operetta Glückliche Reise
- Die Zofen (1964, TV film) — based on the play The Maids by Jean Genet
- Frau Luna (1964) — based on Paul Lincke's operetta Frau Luna
- Meine Nichte Susanne (1964, TV film) — Remake of the 1950 film My Niece Susanne
- Schicken Sie mir einen Dollar! (1965, TV film) — based on the play The Gimmick by Joseph Julian
- Bei Pfeiffers ist Ball (1966, TV film)
- An einem ganz gewöhnlichen Tag (1966, TV film) — based on the story Salto Mortale by Milo Dor
- Corinne und der Seebär (1966, TV film) — screenplay by Karl Wittlinger
- Wilhelmina (1966–1968, TV series, 5 episodes) — screenplay by Barbara Noack
- Die Frau des Fotografen (1967, TV film) — based on the play Fabien by Marcel Pagnol
- Heinrich IV (1967, TV film) — based on the play Henry IV by Luigi Pirandello
- Im Ballhaus ist Musike (1967, TV film) — sequel to Bei Pfeiffers ist Ball
- Im Ballhaus wird geschwoft (1968, TV film) — sequel to Im Ballhaus ist Musike
- Gold für Montevasall (1968, TV film)
- Ein Sommer mit Nicole (1969, TV series, 13 episodes)
- Wie ein Wunder kam die Liebe (1969, TV film)
- Miss Molly Mill (1970, TV series, 13 episodes)
- Familie Bergmann (1970–1971, TV series, 2 episodes)
- Die Frau ohne Kuß (1971, TV film) — based on Walter Kollo's operetta
- Ich träume von Millionen (1971, TV film) — sequel to Wie ein Wunder kam die Liebe
- Die keusche Susanne (1972, TV film) — based on Jean Gilbert's operetta Die keusche Susanne
- Hofball bei Zille (1972, TV film)
- Algebra um Acht (1972–1973, TV series, 13 episodes)
- Alle lieben Célimare (1973, TV film) — based on the play Célimare le bien-aimé by Eugène Labiche
- Mein Onkel Benjamin (1973, TV film) — based on the novel Mon oncle Benjamin by Claude Tillier
- So'n Theater (1973, TV film)
- Der kleine Doktor (1974, TV series, 7 episodes) — based on stories by Georges Simenon
- Hochzeitsnacht im Paradies (1974, TV film) — based on Friedrich Schröder's operetta Wedding Night in Paradise
- Streng geheim (1975, TV film) — Remake of the 1964 film A Mission for Mr. Dodd
- Beschlossen und verkündet (1975, TV series, 13 episodes)
- Es muss nicht immer Kaviar sein (1977, TV series) — based on a novel by Johannes Mario Simmel
- Endstation Paradies (1977, TV film)
- Drei Damen vom Grill (1977, TV series, the first 6 episodes)
- Grille und Ameise (1979, TV film) — based on a play by Alfonso Paso
- Der Führerschein (1979, TV film) — screenplay by Irina Korschunow
- Ihr 106. Geburtstag (1979, TV film) — based on a play by Jean Sarment
- Der Urlaub (1980, TV film) — screenplay by Irina Korschunow
- Kintopp Kintopp (1981, TV series, 13 episodes)
- Tatort: Im Fadenkreuz (1981, TV series episode)
- Zurück an den Absender (1981, TV film)
- Wie es geschah (1983, TV film) — screenplay by Irina Korschunow
- Suddenly at Home (1985, TV film) — based on a play by Francis Durbridge
- Ein Mann ist soeben erschossen worden (1985, TV film) — based on a play by Jaime Salom
- Der Kandidat (1986, TV film) — based on the play Le Candidat by Gustave Flaubert
- Between Heaven and Earth (1987, TV film) — based on a novel by Otto Ludwig
- Tatort: Schuldlos schuldig (1988, TV series episode)

== Bibliography ==
- Fritsche, Maria. Homemade Men in Postwar Austrian Cinema: Nationhood, Genre and Masculinity . Berghahn Books, 2013.
