= Firework (song) =

2010 single by Katy Perry

Single by Katy Perry

from the album Teenage Dream
- Released: October 26, 2010
- Studio: Roc the Mic (New York City)
- Genre: Dance-pop
- Length: 3:47
- Label: Capitol
- Songwriters: Katy Perry; Mikkel S. Eriksen; Tor Erik Hermansen; Sandy Wilhelm; Ester Dean
- Producers: Stargate; Sandy Vee

Katy Perry singles chronology
"Teenage Dream" (2010)	"Firework" (2010)	"E.T." (2011)

Music video
- "Firework" on YouTube

"Firework" is a song by American singer Katy Perry from her third studio album, Teenage Dream (2010). She co-wrote the song with Ester Dean and the song's producers Stargate and Sandy Vee. The track was mostly recorded at StarRoc's Roc the Mic Studios, based in New York City, New York. It is a dance-pop self-empowerment anthem with inspirational lyrics, and Perry's favorite track on the album. Capitol Records released "Firework" as the third Teenage Dream single on October 26, 2010.

The song was commercially successful, charting at number one in Canada, New Zealand, and the United States while reaching the top five in Australia, Austria, Belgium, the Czech Republic, Germany, Hungary, Ireland, Israel, Italy, Mexico, Norway, Poland, Scotland, Slovakia, Sweden, Switzerland, and the United Kingdom. It has also been certified diamond in Australia, Brazil, Canada, France, and the United States as well as multi-platinum in Austria, Italy, New Zealand, Norway, the United Kingdom. In the United States, "Firework" was the fifth-most played single on radios during 2011. The song has since sold 17 million copies worldwide.

An accompanying music video, directed by Dave Meyers, was released on October 28, 2010. It portrays Perry singing and dancing around Budapest, with interspersed scenes of young people becoming confident in themselves. An open casting call for the music video drew an unprecedented 38,000 applicants. On MuchMusic's top 50 videos of 2010, "Firework" reached the top position. The music video was nominated for three awards at the 2011 MTV Video Music Awards, eventually winning one of those, the Video of the Year, the main and final award. "Firework" was nominated for Record of the Year and Best Pop Solo Performance at the 54th Grammy Awards. The song was performed on all of Perry's concert tours since the California Dreams Tour, alongside her concert residency Play and the Super Bowl XLIX halftime show in 2015.

== Production and composition ==
"Firework" was written by Katy Perry, Stargate, Sandy Wilhelm, and Ester Dean and produced by Stargate and Sandy Vee at Soapbox Studios in Atlanta, Georgia. It was recorded at Roc the Mic Studios in New York City, New York. The track was mixed at The Bunker Studios by Vee. Audio engineering was done by Carlos Oyanedel and Damien Lewis. All instruments were done by Stargate and Vee. Perry provided the Lead and background vocals, and said in 2010 that "Firework" is her favorite song on Teenage Dream, adding the track has "a fantastic message" along with "a great beat". She also hoped it could serve as "an anthem that's not cheesy".

According to Perry, "Firework" is influenced by Jack Kerouac's novel, On the Road. The line "Cause baby, you're a firework / Come on, show 'em what you're worth / Make 'em go, awe, awe, awe" is based on Kerouac's line "burn, burn, burn, like fabulous yellow roman candles exploding like spiders across the stars and in the middle you see the blue centerlight pop and everybody goes 'Awww!'" "Firework" is a dance-pop song that runs for 3 minutes and 47 seconds. The song is composed in the key of A♭ major and is set in time signature of common time with a tempo of 124 beats per minute. Perry's vocal range spans from A♭_{3} to E♭_{5}.

== Critical reception ==
MTV's Tom Thorogood praised Perry's vocals, though he felt the lyrics were "clunky". Writing for the same publication, Chris Ryan compared its lyrics to Bette Midler's "Wind Beneath My Wings" and Miley Cyrus's "The Climb", finding "Firework" to be more upbeat than those, and called the chorus "mountain-moving". He also commented "Asking if we ever feel like caving in, like falling down like a house of cards, Perry and her big, bad, bouncing chorus comes along to save the day." Although Matthew Cole of Slant Magazine did not believe its attempt to use inspirational lyrics made sense, he felt "the chorus gains some momentum and the song would work well enough in a club setting that you could forgive its otherwise glaring weaknesses." Los Angeles Times reviewer Ann Powers believed it highlighted how the singer was hollow like the plastic bag mentioned in the song's lyrics, adding "Perry felt like that bag, but then realized what a bag was for: to be filled up with shiny, purchasable things."

Stephen Thomas Erlewine of AllMusic ranked "Firework" among the top tracks on the Teenage Dream album while PopMatters contributor Steve Leftridge deemed it "the record's last hurrah; though nothing particularly memorable ... 'Firework' has at least a bit of staying power". Conversely, Nick Levine of Digital Spy gave the song five out of five stars, calling it "a straight up self-empowerment anthem wrapped in a Coldplay-on-poppers club banger from the Stargate team." Chris Richards from The Washington Post described the song as "too mushy". Al Fox of BBC Music deemed track mature and liked the vocals, declaring it "a true demonstration of Perry's musicianship". In contrast, The Journal contributor Jeb Inge found it "entirely predictable" and believed her voice was "over-the-top". "Firework" was nominated for Record of the Year and Best Pop Solo Performance at the 54th Grammy Awards, losing both to Adele's "Rolling in the Deep".

== Commercial performance ==
In the United States, "Firework" debuted at position 57 on the issue dated November 6, 2010. On the issue dated December 18, 2010, the song reached number one on the Billboard Hot 100, becoming Perry's fourth overall number-one single in the US and the third from Teenage Dream following "California Gurls" and its title track. As a result, the album became the first from a female artist since Monica's 1998 album The Boy Is Mine to have three consecutive singles from an album top the chart. It spent four non-consecutive weeks at number one on the Hot 100. The song topped Hot Dance Club Songs, Pop chart, Adult Pop Songs and Adult Contemporary chart. On the week ending January 8, 2011, "Firework" sold 509,000 digital downloads within the US, which at the time was the fourth ever largest amount of weekly downloads in the country behind Flo Rida's "Right Round", Kesha's "Tik Tok", and Bruno Mars's "Grenade". The song was certified 12× platinum by the Recording Industry Association of America (RIAA). On January 5, 2012, Nielsen Broadcast Data Systems ranked it as the fifth-most-played single on US radio during 2011 with 509,000 plays. In 2014, she became the first artist in digital history to sell 5 million or more copies of six different songs with "Firework", "Hot n Cold", "California Gurls", "ET", "Roar", and "Dark Horse". As of August 2020, it is her highest-selling song in the United States with 7,400,000 copies sold there.

In Canada, "Firework" debuted at number 51 on the Canadian Hot 100 issue dated November 6, 2010 and reached number one on December 18, 2010. On October 31, 2010, "Firework" debuted at number 37 in Australia on the official ARIA Singles Chart and moved to number 15 the next week. It peaked at number three and was certified six-times platinum by the Australian Recording Industry Association (ARIA) for sales over 350,000 copies. The song debuted at number 34 in New Zealand on October 4, 2010 and reached the top spot after six weeks.

The song entered at number five on the UK Singles Chart and peaked at number three. "Firework" became Perry's first song to sell over one million copies in the United Kingdom, and as of September 2017, it is her second-highest selling track behind "Roar" with sales of 1,091,743 copies. It has also been certified triple platinum by the British Phonographic Industry (BPI). Across Europe, "Firework" achieved great commercial success and reached the top five in Germany, Austria, Belgium, Italy, Norway, Sweden, and Switzerland, while reaching the top ten in France and the Netherlands. The song stayed 80 weeks in the former with many re-entries, and debuted at number 7 by the end of January 2011, becoming her fifth top ten in France and the first since "California Gurls", while reaching the summit at French Airplay by the end of December 2010. It is Perry's longest-running single to date and the fourth best-selling song of her career, with 140,000 units sold, tying with "California Gurls". As of May 2022, "Firework" has sold 17 million copies worldwide.

== Music video ==
=== Development and release ===
The video is part of a cross-promotional deal with European telecommunications group Deutsche Telekom. Deutsche Telekom hosted a series of activities and competitions from which fans around Europe would be recruited to be in the video. MTV News reported that Perry started filming the video on September 28, 2010. The video was directed by Dave Meyers, choreographed by Natricia Bernard, and shot in Budapest. The official teaser trailer of the music video was released on October 15, 2010. An open casting call for the music video drew an unprecedented 38,000 applicants. Perry dedicated it to the It Gets Better Project. On October 28, 2010, the video was released onto YouTube, and has amassed more than 1.5 billion views as of March 2026.

For unknown reasons, the official music video on YouTube was geo-blocked outside the United States, Germany, Austria and Switzerland in April 2025 (though it was restored a few days later), and it was geo-blocked again in December 2025, this time the video was geo-blocked outside the United States, United Kingdom and Ireland. As of January 19, 2026, the video was still geo-restricted to the United States, United Kingdom, Ireland, Bahamas, Falkland and Solomon Islands and Turkey. However, since May 8, 2026, the video's availability was restored to most of the world, and the video is only blocked in Belarus, Russia and Puerto Rico.

=== Synopsis ===
Perry dancing at the Buda Castle with a group of people as fireworks burst from their souls

Perry opens the video gazing down upon the city from a balcony. As she sings into the night, fireworks burst from her soul and soon inspire young people throughout the city to overcome their fears and insecurities, in the process igniting their own fireworks. One boy confronts his parents, who are in a heated argument and upsetting his younger sister, and pushes them apart. A shy overweight girl, playing the role of wallflower at a pool party, finds the courage to shed her clothes and jump in the pool with her friends. At a children's hospital, one leukemia patient proves to herself that she can publicly show herself with or without losing hair. Elsewhere in a club, a closeted homosexual teenage boy approaches his male friend there and kisses him. One struggling young performer walking home in a dark alley uses tricks from his magic act to win over a group of street toughs who were trying to rob him. Soon the youth of the city are converging upon the courtyard of Buda Castle, joining Perry to dance and light up the night with fireworks bursting from their own souls, as the camera pans up to the sky for their popping sounds, ending the video.

=== Reception ===
On MuchMusic's top 50 videos of 2010, "Firework" was ranked No. 1. The video won Video of the Year at the 2011 MTV Video Music Awards and was nominated for Best Female Video and the newly introduced Best Video with a Message category.

== Live performances ==
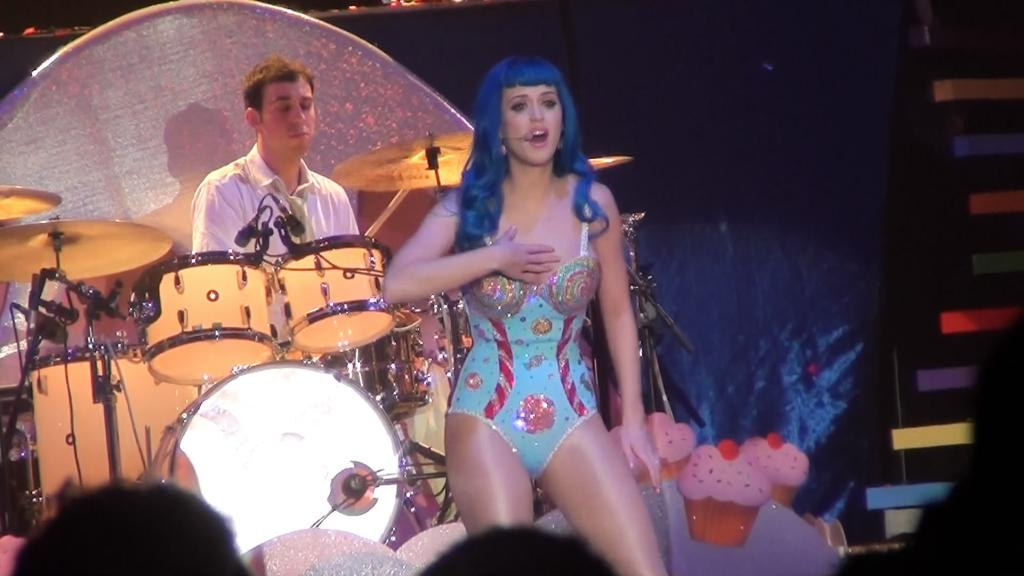
Perry performing the song on her California Dreams Tour

On November 7, 2010, Perry performed "Firework" at the 2010 MTV Europe Music Awards held in Madrid, Spain on November 7, 2010, in an outdoor performance in the front of the Puerta de Alcalá monument. She also performed the song again in the United Kingdom, this time on the chat show Paul O'Grady Live on November 12, 2010, the BBC Radio 1 Teen Awards on November 14, 2010, and at the American Music Awards of 2010. Perry performed "Firework" at the 2010 annual Victoria's Secret Fashion Show which aired on November 30, 2010. Her performance of "Firework" on Willkommen bei Mario Barth aired December 4, 2010, in Germany, a performance that was recorded in October 2010. She appeared on The Ellen DeGeneres Show on December 8, 2010, to perform an acoustic version of the song.

On May 1, 2011, Perry sang "Firework" at the 53rd TV Week Logie Awards in Australia. The song is featured on the set list of the California Dreams Tour. Perry performed the song as part of a Live Lounge special for BBC Radio 1's Fearne Cotton on March 19, 2012, along with "Part of Me", "The One That Got Away", "Thinking of You" and "Niggas in Paris". On October 13, 2012, Perry performed the song as a duet with Jodi DiPiazza, an 11-year-old girl with autism, as part of the Night of Too Many Stars benefit, later broadcast on Comedy Central. For Barack Obama's 2012 presidential candidacy, Perry performed several of her hit songs dressed as a ballot, including "Teenage Dream", "Firework", and "Wide Awake". Expressing solidarity for his campaign, the box next to Obama's name was shaded.

On May 25, 2014, Perry performed the song as her encore at BBC Radio 1's Big Weekend in Glasgow. She was the headliner of Super Bowl XLIX halftime show, which took place on February 1, 2015, and "Firework" was the last song of the performance.

On May 27, 2017, Perry performed the song at BBC Radio 1's Big Weekend in Hull. On January 20, 2021, she sang it in front of the Lincoln Memorial during the "Celebrating America" inaugural concert special commemorating the Inauguration of Joe Biden as the 46th President of the United States, closing out the show. A massive firework display was coordinated to appear near the Washington Monument, to serve as a backdrop for her performance.

On May 7, 2023, Perry performed it along with "Roar" at the Coronation Concert outside Windsor Castle in celebration of the coronation of King Charles III and Queen Camilla. She also sang "Firework" as the finale for her residency Play and her tours the California Dreams Tour, the Prismatic World Tour, Witness: The Tour, and The Lifetimes Tour.

On January 17, 2026, Perry performed this song on Joy Awards 2026 that took place in Saudi Arabia alongside Roar and Dark Horse.

== Cover versions and usage in media ==
"Firework" was prominently featured in the 2012 animated film Madagascar 3: Europe's Most Wanted, during the circus acts with the main characters. The track was also used in two dramatic scenes from the French film Rust and Bone, starring Marion Cotillard. It is one of the main songs featured in the 2014 political action-comedy film The Interview starring James Franco and Seth Rogen, with a cover version by Jennie Lena.

"Firework" is referenced in the ninth episode of Unbreakable Kimmy Schmidt, when Titus tries to convince Kimmy he wrote the song himself. Jon Jafari covered the song in February 2016, promising to do so if his goal of $25,000 was reached during a charity Twitch livestream. "Firework" was the first song played after Hillary Clinton accepted the Democratic presidential nomination at the 2016 Democratic National Convention.

The song was featured on the "lipsync for your life" segment in the twelfth season of RuPaul's Drag Race, being performed by contestants Widow Von'Du and Jackie Cox. "Firework" was played in the episode "Old White Men" of The Dropout on the radio in a car, when Alan Ruck sings along to this as a fictionalized version of Walgreens executive Jay Rosan. It is performed as a power ballad by the character Satine in the jukebox musical Moulin Rouge!

During the second presidency of Donald Trump, Perry condemned the White House's use of "Firework" to promote the 2026 Iran war. She said of the use: "I wrote this song to be an anthem of hope, healing, and inner strength for people going through their darkest personal moments. To see a message of self-worth and upliftment weaponized to soundtrack destruction and violence is a complete violation of everything my song stands for. My music is for bringing people together, not celebrating warfare."

== Track listing ==
- Digital download
1. "Firework" – 3:47
2. "Firework" (Music video) – 3:55
- CD single
1. "Firework" – 3:48
2. "Firework" (Instrumental) – 3:51

== Credits and personnel ==
Credits adapted from the Teenage Dream liner notes.

- Katy Perry — vocals, songwriting
- Stargate — instrumentation, production
  - Mikkel S. Eriksen — songwriting, recording
  - Tor Erik Hermansen — songwriting
- Sandy Vee — songwriting, instrumentation, production, mixing
- Ester Dean — songwriting
- Carlos Oyandel — additional engineering
- Damien Lewis — additional engineering
- Josh Houghkirk — additional engineering assistant
- Phil Tan — mixing
- Brian Gardner — mastering

== Charts ==
=== Weekly charts ===
Weekly chart performance
Chart (2010–2012)	Peak position
Australia (ARIA)	3
Austria (Ö3 Austria Top 40)	3
Belgium (Ultratop 50 Flanders)	5
Belgium (Ultratop 50 Wallonia)	5
Canada Hot 100 (Billboard)	1
CIS Airplay (TopHit)	59
Croatia International Airplay (HRT)	6
Czech Republic Airplay (ČNS IFPI)	4
Czech Republic Singles Digital (ČNS IFPI)	95
Denmark (Tracklisten)	14
Europe (European Hot 100 Singles)	9
Finland (Suomen virallinen lista)	18
France (SNEP)	7
Germany (GfK)	4
Hungary (Rádiós Top 40)	2
Ireland (IRMA)	2
Israel International Airplay (Media Forest)	3
Italy (FIMI)	4
Japan Hot 100 (Billboard)	27
Luxembourg Digital Song Sales (Billboard)	3
Mexico (Billboard Mexican Airplay)	4
Mexico Anglo (Monitor Latino)	2
Netherlands (Dutch Top 40)	8
Netherlands (Single Top 100)	6
New Zealand (Recorded Music NZ)	1
Norway (VG-lista)	2
Poland Airplay (ZPAV)	3
Portugal Digital Song Sales (Billboard)	3
Romania (Romanian Top 100)	15
Russia Airplay (TopHit)	69
Scottish Singles Sales (Official Charts)	3
Slovakia Airplay (ČNS IFPI)	2
Spain (Promusicae)	14
Sweden (Sverigetopplistan)	4
Switzerland (Schweizer Hitparade)	3
UK Singles (Official Charts)	3
US Billboard Hot 100	1
US Adult Contemporary (Billboard)	1
US Adult Pop Airplay (Billboard)	1
US Dance Club Songs (Billboard)	1
US Dance Airplay (Billboard)	1
US Pop Airplay (Billboard)	1
US Rhythmic Airplay (Billboard)	5
Venezuela Pop Rock (Record Report)	1

Chart (2013)	Peak position
South Korea International Singles (Gaon)	139
UK Singles (Official Charts)	89

=== Year-end charts ===
Annual chart rankings
Chart (2010)	Position
Australia (ARIA)	24
Germany (Official German Charts)	88
Hungary (Rádiós Top 40)	94
Ireland (IRMA)	9
Netherlands (Dutch Top 40)	75
New Zealand (Recorded Music NZ)	17
UK Singles (OCC)	19

Chart (2011)	Position
Australia (ARIA)	28
Austria (Ö3 Austria Top 40)	37
Belgium (Ultratop 50 Flanders)	57
Belgium (Ultratop 50 Wallonia)	32
Brazil (Crowley)	14
Canada (Canadian Hot 100)	8
Croatia International Airplay (HRT)	50
France (SNEP)	34
Germany (Official German Charts)	53
Hungary (Rádiós Top 40)	26
Italy (Musica e dischi)	40
Netherlands (Single Top 100)	38
New Zealand (Recorded Music NZ)	31
Romania (Romanian Top 100)	88
Spain (PROMUSICAE)	32
Sweden (Sverigetopplistan)	43
Switzerland (Schweizer Hitparade)	36
UK Singles (OCC)	65
US Billboard Hot 100	3
US Adult Contemporary (Billboard)	2
US Adult Top 40 (Billboard)	6
US Dance Club Songs (Billboard)	19
US Mainstream Top 40 (Billboard)	8
US Rhythmic (Billboard)	29

Chart (2012)	Position
France (SNEP)	133
UK Singles (OCC)	187

=== Decade-end charts ===
2010s chart rankings
Chart (2010–2019)	Position
Australia (ARIA)	25
US Billboard Hot 100	43

== Certifications and sales ==
Certifications and sales
Region	Certification	Certified units/sales
Australia (ARIA)	16× Platinum	1,120,000^{‡}
Austria (IFPI Austria)	2× Platinum	60,000^{*}
Belgium (BRMA)	Gold	15,000^{*}
Brazil (Pro-Música Brasil)	Diamond	250,000^{‡}
Canada (Music Canada)	Diamond	800,000^{‡}
Denmark (IFPI Danmark)	Platinum	90,000^{‡}
Finland	3× Platinum	12,000
France (SNEP)	Diamond	333,333^{‡}
Germany (BVMI)	Platinum	300,000^{‡}
Italy (FIMI)	2× Platinum	60,000^{*}
Japan (RIAJ)	Gold	100,000^{*}
Mexico (AMPROFON)	Platinum+Gold	90,000^{*}
New Zealand (RMNZ)	5× Platinum	150,000^{‡}
Norway (IFPI Norway)	4× Platinum	240,000^{‡}
Portugal (AFP)	Gold	5,000^{‡}
Spain (Promusicae)	Platinum	60,000^{‡}
Sweden (GLF)	Platinum	40,000^{‡}
Switzerland (IFPI Switzerland)	Gold	15,000^{^}
United Kingdom (BPI)	4× Platinum	2,400,000^{‡}
United States (RIAA)	12× Platinum	12,000,000^{‡}
Ringtone
Canada (Music Canada)	Gold	20,000^{*}
Streaming
Greece (IFPI Greece)	Gold	1,000,000^{†}
Summaries
Worldwide	—	17,000,000 (Note: Worldwide sales figures as of May 2022.)
^{*} Sales figures based on certification alone.^{^} Shipments figures based on certification alone.^{‡} Sales+streaming figures based on certification alone.^{†} Streaming-only figures based on certification alone.

== Release history ==
Release dates and formats for "Firework"
Region	Date	Format	Version(s)	Label	Ref.
United States	October 26, 2010	Contemporary hit radio	Original	Capitol	
United Kingdom	November 2, 2010	Digital download	Original	Capitol	
United States	November 16, 2010	Rhythmic contemporary radio	Original	Capitol	
United States	November 22, 2010	Hot adult contemporary radio	Original	Capitol	
United Kingdom	December 2, 2010	CD	Original; Instrumental	Capitol	
Germany	December 3, 2010	CD	Original; Instrumental	Capitol	
France	January 24, 2011	CD	Original	Capitol	

== See also ==
- List of best-selling singles in the United States
- List of number-one singles from the 2010s (New Zealand)
- List of Canadian Hot 100 number-one singles of 2010
- List of Billboard Hot 100 number ones of 2010
- List of Billboard Hot 100 number ones of 2011
- List of Billboard Mainstream Top 40 number-one songs of 2011
- List of Billboard Dance Club Songs number ones of 2011
- List of number-one dance airplay hits of 2011 (U.S.)
- List of Billboard Adult Top 40 number-one songs of the 2010s
- List of Billboard Adult Contemporary number ones of 2011
- List of highest-certified singles in Australia
