= Arman İnci =

Turkish-German actor

- Born: February 4, 1991 (age 35); Berlin, Germany.
- Years active: 2000–present

Arman İnci (born February 4, 1991) is a Turkish-German actor.

== Filmography ==
Film
Year	Film	Role	Notes
2000	A Handful of Grass	Kendal	

=== Television ===
Year	Film	Role	Notes
2004	The Amber Amulet		
2003	Die Graslöwen	Murat	7 episodes
2002	Barbara Wood: Hounds and Jackals	Juan	
