= Nashorn (disambiguation) =

Nashorn (German: rhinoceros) is a German tank destroyer of World War II.

Nashorn may also refer to:

- Nashorn (JavaScript engine), software by Oracle

== See also ==
- Nashorn, Zebra & Co., a German television series
