= Meinecke =

Meinecke is a German surname. It may refer to:

== People ==
- Emil Meinecke (1892–1975), German flying ace during World War I
- Friedrich Meinecke (1862–1954), German historian
- Friedrich Meinecke (sculptor) (1878–1913)
- Tore Meinecke (born 1967), German tennis player
- Tristan Meinecke (1916-2004), American artist

== Other ==
- Flugstaffel Meinecke, German television action series
