= Café International =

Board game

- Designers: Rudi Hoffmann
- Publishers: Mattel; Relaxx; Amigo
- Players: 2–4
- Setup time: 5 minutes
- Playing time: 20–60 minutes (30 minutes) [average]
- Chance: High (card drawing)
- Skills: Observation, Strategy, Tactics

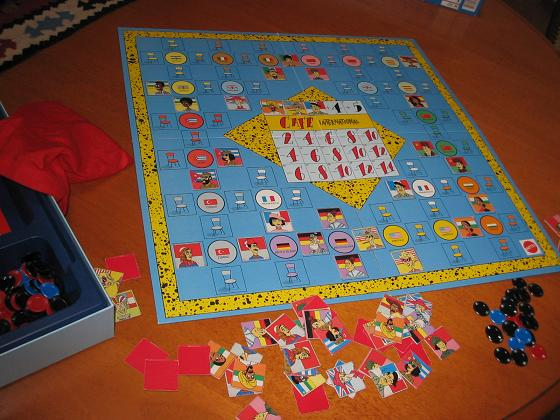

Café International is a 1989 tile-laying board game created by Rudi Hoffmann that won the Spiel des Jahres in 1989.

== History ==
The game was designed by Rudi Hoffman, and was published in 1989 by Mattel. It was re-released in 1998 by Relaxx, and then by Amigo in 1999.

== The game ==
=== Components ===
- 100 tiles representing 96 "customers": four men and four women from 12 countries (Central African Republic, China, Cuba, France, Germany, India, Italy, Russia, Spain, Turkey, United Kingdom and United States), plus four jokers (wild cards)
- a board with 24 different tables. Each table has a specific nationality that is allowed to sit there, but some chairs are shared between two tables, allowing two nationalities to sit at either linked table.
- coloured chips to keep track of scores
- a bag to hold the tiles

=== Setup ===
The tiles are placed in the bag, and each player draws five customer tiles at random from the bag, and places them face up on the table. This becomes the player's hand, and is always visible to the other players.

=== Gameplay ===
Each player must seat a customer at a table in the cafe, but only at a table representing the customer's nationality, and keeping the division of gender at any table as even as possible. If the active player is unable to seat a customer at a table, there is room for any 20 customers at the bar. Once the active player has played a tile, the player draws a new tile to bring the player's hand back to five. However, if the player completed a table that is composed of a single nationality, the player does not draw a new tile, in effect reducing that player's hand by one.

=== Jokers ===
If the active player does not have the correct tile to place a customer at a table, and the player has a joker, the player may use the joker as a wild card to represent any nationality and gender. If another player on their turn has the proper customer that can be seated in a seat occupied by a joker, the second player can exchange the joker for the correct customer, and then save the joker to be used later.

=== Earning points ===
The active player scores points by placing a customer at a table. If the tile is the second, third or fourth customer at a table, the player scores 2, 3 or 4 points respectively. If a table of 4 is also of a single nationality, then the player earns 8 points rather than 4 points. Coloured chips are used to record points.

The active player can also score or lose points by seating customers at the bar, where a positive or negative score is printed on each chair. Early in the game, players will seat customers on the five seats with positive scores. Later in the game, players will be forced to seat customers on the fifteen seats with negative scores.

At the end of the game, each player must deduct five points from their score for each tile left in their hand.

=== Ending the game ===
The game ends immediately when any one of four situations occurs:

1. The 20 seats at the bar are filled.
2. Every chair around the tables is occupied.
3. There are only four tiles left in the bag.
4. One player has no tiles left (having formed 5 single nationality tables).

=== Victory conditions ===
The player who has accumulated the most points is the winner.

== Reception ==
In the September–October 1989 edition of Games International (Issue 9), Brian Walker called this game designer Rudi Hoffman's "weakest offering", and derided the jury of Spiel des Jahres for giving this game the prestigious "Game of the Year" award. He gave the game a below-average rating of 2 out of 5, saying, "it quickly becomes apparent that winning is heavily dependent on the luck of the draw."

The Austrian website Spieletest called this "an easy to understand placement game. The nice presentation in comic design and the simple gameplay make this top-class game. This game deserves the Spiel des Jahres 1989 award."

The German website SofaHelden liked the game, saying, "It contains luck components as well as strategic and tactical parts and is fascinating because of the different process each time, in which you have no idea until the end who will leave the table as the winner. [...] As is so often the case, the more players, the more interesting and unpredictable the process will be."

The Dutch website SpellenMolen comments, "The game seems so simple, but there is a lot more strategy in it than you would suspect! Because you can openly see which guests your fellow players have, you can take this into account. By playing one card, or not playing it, you can really bother your opponents." The website concludes by giving this game an above-average score of 8 out of 10, saying, " A strategic classic that deserves all your attention!"

== Awards ==
Café International was awarded the 1989 Spiel des Jahres (Game of the Year).
