= Münchener Freiheit =

Münchener Freiheit may refer to:

- Münchener Freiheit (band), a German pop and rock band
- Münchner Freiheit, a square in Munich, Germany, called Münchener Freiheit until 1998
  - Münchner Freiheit (Munich U-Bahn), a station
- Münchener Freiheit (TV series), a 1985 German TV series
