= Von Null auf 42 =

- Country of origin: Germany

Von Null auf 42 is a German television series.

== See also ==
- List of German television series
