= Tessa – Leben für die Liebe =

- Country of origin: Germany

Tessa – Leben für die Liebe or simply Leben für die Liebe is a German television series that ran for one season in 2006.

== See also ==
- List of German television series
