= Seehund, Puma & Co. =

- Country of origin: Germany

Seehund, Puma & Co. is a German television series.

== See also ==
- List of German television series
