= Emm wie Meikel =

- Country of origin: Germany

Emm wie Meikel is a German television series. It is a puppet show focusing on a bearded mouse character, Meikel Katzengreis. Some later segments included another puppet character named DeMos, the foreign cousin of Meikel.

== See also ==
- List of German television series
