= Drei Dschungeldetektive =

- Country of origin: Germany

Drei Dschungeldetektive (Three Jungle Detectives) is a six-part German television series. Produced by the Augsburger Puppenkiste, which was created in 1991 under the direction of Sepp Strubel in cooperation with the Hessischer Rundfunk and was first broadcast in 1992/1993.

== Setting ==
All actions take place in the fictional jungle village named Cocopalmariocasas on the Cocopalmario river. Cocopalmariocasas can only be reached by a river and there is only one phone in the village square. The other places where the village community meets are the jetty at Cocopalmario and an ice cream parlor.

== Characters ==
All characters are represented as personified animal figures. The main actors are the three minors Elinor, Zapp and Bubu, who investigate minor crime cases as detectives. A number of other residents live in the village, who are occasionally involved in the plot. Many villagers like to sing. The most important characters in detail:

- 'Elinor' is a hippo who is a fan of 'Inspector Camembert', a cartoon hero with a trench coat and floppy hat, whom she admires in the only TV in Cocopalmariocasas, in the restaurant by Jojo. She is afraid of water and easily gets runny nose.
- 'Zapp' is a heron who is very smart and can write with his beak and makes technical inventions in his workshop. He often uses the exclamation "There's a lot going on in my head" and "Belahuahe!". He avoids flying.
- 'Bubu' is a chimpanzee who has an aunt called 'Madame Juliette'. He lives in a tree house, for which Zapp has built an elevator for so that he can be visited by all other villagers. He is very musical and plays two hands on his xylophone. He often affirms statements with 'Yes, yes, yes!'.
- 'Sheriff Müller' is a bear who is responsible for the police work in the jungle, but according to his own account is permanently overloaded. He spends most of his time in a hammock and is the only resident to have an off-road vehicle and a motor boat.
- 'Jojo' is a dog who is the ice cream shop owner. From time to time he visits his beloved dog friend, the photo model 'Irene' from abroad, who otherwise sends him postcards every day. Zapp built him a wind mill for electricity with which his television can be operated. However, the refrigerator must be cooled with ice delivered daily.
- The 'Bird of Paradise' is predominantly concerned with its magnificent appearance and has for this purpose a mirror, into which it's singing its recurring narcissistic table song "Jeez, what am I beautiful".
- 'Captain Freshwater Charly' is a beaver who sails to the village daily in his steamboat. It not only transports mail and goods, but also visitors. He tends to sing sad shanties.
- 'Frau Kangaroo' collects and distributes the mail items to and from Cocopalmariocasas. Otherwise, she is very talkative and had never received any mail herself until she received a message and a lottery ticket.
- 'Nickel Kanin' is a helpful but also curious rabbit who is always happy to help out the three jungle detectives, which he then mostly confirms with the exclamation "Ey, self-reliant!". He can run very quickly, sing beautifully and sleepily despite his speech impairment and insists on not being a rabbit.
- 'Gürtli' is an armadillo who is very proud of the belts he produces that are exported all over the world.
- 'Pfleger Kümmelmann' is a stork who is responsible for the retirement home of the village. He is very polite and correct. On his one-day off a week he is represented by the duck 'Miss Sieben' .
- 'Detlef' is a greyhound with the pseudonyms of 'Dr. Lippsel' and 'Dr. Funkstedt', he sells the residents of the old people's home unnecessary products at inflated prices. He is in a relationship with 'Miss Sieben'. He visits the village with his own boat.
- 'Oma Schildpatt' , a very old turtle, is a resident of the old people's home. She is very hard of hearing.
- 'Grandpa Siegfried' is an elk who is the only male resident of the old people's home. He is always dressed correctly, can hardly see anything, but still has good ears. In his home country he saved up north to be able to afford his retirement home in Cocopalmariocasas.
- 'Frau Arbez' is a zebra, who prefers to stand in front of a fence for camouflage. The best compliment you can give her is to tell her that you couldn't find her there. Otherwise, she is very simple, likes to giggle and also lives in the nursing home.
- 'Mr Svoboda' is a turkey who is the reliable shopkeeper who has almost everything on offer in the village in his general store.
- 'Mr. and Mrs. Panda' are very domestic and like to feed on bamboo.
- 'Mr and Mrs Raccoon' are busy washing clothes all day.
- 'Mr. and Mrs. Schmitt' are aardvarks. They live very quietly in an earthwork, cannot read and show a reserved, naive and benign mind.
- 'Lord of Pelicans' is imaginary and often seems to be without understanding.
- 'Mr. Oka Pi' is an okapi who leads tour groups to and through Cocopalmariocasas and stands out due to well-intentioned tips that are not always as fun as they are meant to be.
- The 'Theater elephant' visits the village as an experienced and well-traveled showman. The three jungle detectives help him prepare and carry out his performance.

Otherwise, penguins appear as tourists, the crocodiles as villainous gang members and three whispering owls appear at night.

== See also ==
- List of German television series
