= Peter Steiners Theaterstadl =

- Country of origin: Germany

Peter Steiners Theaterstadl is a German television series.

== See also ==
- List of German television series
