= Dresdner Schnauzen =

- Country of origin: Germany

Dresdner Schnauzen is a German television series.

== See also ==
- List of German television series
