= America – The Freedom to Be =

- Also known as: USA & Canada - The freedom to be...
- Country of origin: Germany
- No. of seasons: 1
- No. of episodes: 13

Original release
- Network: WDR

America – People and Places, known earlier under the name America – The Freedom to Be and USA & Canada – The Freedom to Be, is a German English-language learning course in the form of a 13-part television series presenting the history of select states in the United States and provinces in Canada. The series explores the current situation of politics, education, sports, and freedoms in these states and provinces through interviews with different people living in the United States and Canada. The course is presented entirely in English.

Produced by WDR, the program is an extension of its Fast Track English series.

The series was also shown in the German educational television program Planet Schule

== States and Provinces Covered ==
- 40. Massachusetts
- 41. Pennsylvania
- 42. Illinois
- 43. Washington D.C.
- 44. Kentucky
- 45. South Carolina
- 46. Georgia
- 47. Florida
- 48. Quebec
- 49. Ontario
- 50. Alberta
- 51. British Columbia
- 52. Nova Scotia

== See also ==
- List of German television series

== Book ==
The book version of the series is titled America – People and Places. ISBN 978-3-8058-3131-4

== Audio Cassette ==
Two audio cassettes are listed under the title America – People and Places. ISBN 978-3-8058-3438-4
