= Ein Tag schreibt Geschichte =

- Country of origin: Germany

Ein Tag schreibt Geschichte is a German television series that aired on the VOX channel starting in 2011.

== See also ==
- List of German television series
