= Die Hammer-Soap – Heimwerker im Glück =

- Country of origin: Germany

Die Hammer-Soap – Heimwerker im Glück is a German television series.

== See also ==
- List of German television series
