= Hans im Glück aus Herne 2 =

- Directed by: Roland Gall
- Country of origin: Germany
- No. of seasons: 1
- No. of episodes: 7

Original release
- Network: ZDF
- Release: 1983 – 1983

Hans im Glück aus Herne 2 is a German television series.

== See also ==
- List of German television series
