= Berlin Bohème =

- Country of origin: Germany

Berlin Bohème is a German television series (soap opera), produced in 53 episodes from 1999 to 2005. The series depicts the lives of Bohemian artists in Berlin; the majority of the protagonists were gay or lesbian. The creator and producer of this show is Andreas Weiss, who produced several other gay and lesbian TV-series before.

== See also ==
- List of German television series
