= Donky von Alpha 6*4 =

- Genre: Children's series
- Written by: Thomas Rosié
- Country of origin: Germany
- Original language: German
- No. of episodes: 15

Production
- Production companies: Moser + Rosié Film (until 1996), Golden Point

Original release
- Release: 1955 – 1955

Donky von Alpha 6*4 is a German television series first broadcast in 1995 on ARD as 15 episodes alongside several published comic books.

== Introduction ==
Donky is a rhinoceros-like creature from the planet Alpha 6*4 . He came to Earth due to a problem with his spaceship and settled in Donky lands at the Dream Castle – a small town where two children, Tina and Kenny live. Donky and the children immediately become friends and has numerous adventures. With the help of his horn, Donky is able to turn back time. This allows him to reverse disasters and events (as in the episode "The Tanker Accident ").

== Publication ==
The television series was broadcast in Germany by ARD in 1995. Several repeats followed, later on the Ki.Ka channel . All episodes were also released on VHS.

== Merchandising ==
Several radio plays were released by the voices music label. As well as a biweekly comic book and numerous items such as watches, food, toys, and more accompanied the series. Donky also toured Germany as a two-meter-tall doll, visiting children across the country.

== Continuation ==
In 1996, the co-production between Moser + Rosié Film GmbH and Golden Point ended. Moser + Rosié Film decided to discontinue production of the series due to legal differences with Golden Point.

In 1998, the series' production company changed, and Donky Merchandising & Publishing AG was founded, which went public in 2003. Two four-minute pilot films were produced in 1998/1999, and a 50-minute pilot film entitled "Donky and the Magic Amulet of Satzvey Castle " was produced in 2003. Due to legal disputes and the insolvency of several companies responsible for production and rights management, the film was withdrawn from the market shortly afterward. Parallel to the production of the pilot film, plans were underway for a 26-part animated series and various merchandising items. These, too, were scrapped following the insolvency of Abakus AG, which held a 90% stake in Donky AG.

== See also ==
- List of German television series
