= Mond Mond Mond =

- Country of origin: Germany

Mond Mond Mond is a German television series.

== See also ==
- List of German television series
