= Les années lycée =

Television series

- Country of origin: Germany
- No. of seasons: 1
- No. of episodes: 10

Original release
- Network: Bayerischer Rundfunk

Les années lycée was a German educational television series produced by Bayerischer Rundfunk, teaching French as a foreign or second language to young-adult German viewers.

== See also ==
- List of German television series
