= Helden der Kreisklasse =

German television series

- Country of origin: Germany

Helden der Kreisklasse is a German television series.

== See also ==
- List of German television series
