= Anja & Anton =

- Country of origin: Germany

Anja & Anton was a German children's and youth series. It was produced from 1998 to 2007 by Studio-TV-Film GmbH in Berlin on behalf of ZDF.

In the first two seasons, the series was still entitled "Anja, Anton and ...". The first broadcast of the first episode took place on 24 December 1998 on the Children's Channel.

== See also ==
- List of German television series
