= Märchen der Völker =

- Country of origin: West Germany

Original release
- Release: 1978 – 1979

Märchen der Völker was a West German children's television series broadcast in 1978-1979.

== See also ==
- List of German television series
