= Schlupp vom grünen Stern =

- Country of origin: Germany

Schlupp vom grünen Stern (lit.: Schlupp from the green star) is a German television series. Originally a 1974 children's book by Ellis Kaut, the story was adapted as a marionette play filmed in four half-hour episodes by Augsburger Puppenkiste in 1986. In 1987 four further episodes titled Schlupp vom grünen Stern – Neue Abenteuer auf Terra (Schlupp from the green star - New adventures on Terra) followed.

== See also ==
- List of German television series
