= Fast Track English =

- Also known as: Fast Track English - "The Business World" (2nd series)
- Country of origin: Germany
- No. of seasons: 2
- No. of episodes: 39

Production
- Production company: Pilgrim Productions

Original release
- Network: WDR
- Release: 1997 – 1998

Fast Track English was a German educational television series produced by WDR, teaching English as a foreign or second language to German viewers. Produced in 1997 and 1998, the series was divided into two parts—the main Fast Track English, which focuses on the essentials of the English language in daily life over 26 episodes; and Fast Track English - "The Business World", a 13-part series about the use of English in business.

== See also ==
- America – The Freedom to Be
- List of German television series
