= Viens jouer avec nous =

- Country of origin: Germany

Viens jouer avec nous is a German television series.

== See also ==
- List of German television series
