= Alles in Ordnung – Mit dem Wahnsinn auf Streife =

- Also known as: All Right - On Patrol with Madness
- Created by: Jens Bujar
- Country of origin: Germany
- Original language: German
- No. of seasons: 2
- No. of episodes: 16

Production
- Production company: 20th Television

Original release
- Network: ProSieben
- Release: January 15, 2006

Alles in Ordnung – Mit dem Wahnsinn auf Streife (All Right - On Patrol with Madness) is a German "mockumentary" television series directed by Thilo Gosejohann and aired on the TV station ProSieben since 2005. It is a satire of police series and follows the same concept as Reno 911!.

== See also ==
- List of German television series
