= KTI – Menschen lügen, Beweise nicht =

- Country of origin: Germany

KTI – Menschen lügen, Beweise nicht is a German television series.

== See also ==
- List of German television series
