= Englisch für Anfänger =

- Country of origin: West Germany

Original release
- Release: 1982

Englisch für Anfänger is a West German educational television program made in 1982. The purpose of the program was to teach English as a foreign language to German viewers.

== See also ==
- List of German television series
