= Ein besonderes Paar =

- Starring: Klausjürgen Wussow; Gila von Weitershausen
- Country of origin: Germany

Ein besonderes Paar is a German crime television series. 12 episodes were aired on ZDF in 1992, directed by Helmut Förnbacher.

== See also ==
- List of German television series
