= Alarm in den Bergen =

- Starring: Armin Dahlen
- Country of origin: Germany

Alarm in den Bergen (Alarm in the Mountains) is a German thriller television series which was broadcast on ZDF in 1965. The 13-part series is set in the Bavarian Alps, in the border area around Garmisch.

== Broadcasts ==
The first broadcast took place in 1965 in the ZDF's evening program, every Monday at 6:55 PM. The show fit into the time slot between the Drehschiebe and the beginning of the 7:30 PM news. A rerun of the series was shown from the start of 1967 to the end of 1968 in the daytime programs of the ARD and ZDF. A final rerun was shown in 1971.

== Plot ==
The show focuses on the story of border patrol officer Hans Maussner, and his colleague Toni Kaiser. The plot rotates through stories involving smugglers, poachers, ski accidents, car crashes from mountain cliffs, and murder investigations.

== Episode list ==
Nr.	Original title	First Broadcast	Director	Screenplay
1	The Trail is Lost	February 15, 1965	Armin Dahlen	Fred Dietrich
2	The Highest Danger - Helicopter Deployment	February 22, 1965	Armin Dahlen	Fred Dietrich
3	Shot Run in the Fog	March 8, 1965	Armin Dahlen	Fred Dietrich
4	A Dead Man as Witness	March 15, 1965	Armin Dahlen	Fred Dietrich
5	The Detour	March 22, 1965	Rainer Geis	Fred Dietrich
6	Hot Border	March 29, 1965	Armin Dahlen	Fred Dietrich
7	The Fleeing Murderer	April 5, 1965	Armin Dahlen	Fred Dietrich
8	Deadly Toys	April 12, 1965	Armin Dahlen	Fred Dietrich
9	Hard Fists, Rough Manners	April 26, 1965	Armin Dahlen	Fred Dietrich
10	Death in a Parcel	May 3, 1965	Armin Dahlen	Fred Dietrich
11	The Rape of St. Florian	May 10, 1965	Armin Dahlen	Fred Dietrich
12	Treason at the Border	May 17, 1965	Armin Dahlen	Fred Dietrich
13	A Shock!	May 24, 1965	Armin Dahlen	Fred Dietrich

== Trivia ==
Because so many scenes were filmed in rocky areas or from great heights, bonus features in the DVD editions mention that filming was often very dangerous. The film crew received assistance from the Bavarian Mountain Rescue Service, the Bundeswehr, Bavarian Border Police, and the Austrian Gendarmerie.

== See also ==
- List of German television series
