= Stadt, Land, Mord! =

- Country of origin: Germany

Stadt, Land, Mord! is a German television series.

== See also ==
- List of German television series
