= Märchen der Welt – Puppenspiel der kleinen Bühne =

- Starring: Hans-Georg Panczak
- Country of origin: West Germany
- No. of episodes: 121

Production
- Running time: 30 Minutes

Original release
- Release: 1979 – 1988

Märchen der Welt – Puppenspiel der kleinen Bühne is a West German television series.

== See also ==
- List of German television series
