= Die Torpiraten =

- Country of origin: Germany

Die Torpiraten is a German television series.

== See also ==
- List of German television series
