= Der Prinz von Pumpelonien =

- Country of origin: Germany

Der Prinz von Pumpelonien is a German television series.

== See also ==
- List of German television series
