= Ostsee-Schnauzen =

- Country of origin: Germany

Ostsee-Schnauzen is a German television series.

== Cast ==
- Udo Nagel
- Antje Zimmermann

== See also ==
- List of German television series
