= Die Trotzkis =

- Country of origin: Germany

Die Trotzkis is a German television series.

== See also ==
- List of German television series
