= Kiezgeschichten =

- Country of origin: East Germany

Kiezgeschichten is an East German television series.

== See also ==
- List of German television series
