= Ein ehrenwertes Haus =

- Country of origin: Germany

Ein ehrenwertes Haus is a German television series.

== See also ==
- List of German television series
