= 100 Jahre – Der Countdown =

- Starring: Guido Knopp
- Country of origin: Germany
- No. of seasons: 1
- No. of episodes: 100

Original release
- Network: ZDF
- Release: 1999 – 1999

100 Jahre – Der Countdown (English - 100 Years - The Countdown) is a German documentary television series produced by Zolcer TV. It was first broadcast in 1999 on ZDF. The host of the series is Guido Knopp. Most of the 100 episodes focus on a single event in a given year. The total length of the series is about 16 1/2 hours. The series was first broadcast on the last 100 days of 1999, one episode after the daily news cast ZDF Heute-Journal. Since New Year's Eve 1999 the full length of "100 Jahre" is broadcast several times a year by Phoenix.

== Structure ==
Each of the ten-minute episodes begins with a title. It first shows the Earth from space. As Earth comes closer into view, the series title track plays along with historic recordings. These are:

"Three, Two, One" - Apollo 11 countdown

"I Have a Dream" - Martin Luther King Jr.

"Do you want total war?" - Joseph Goebbels

"We choose freedom!" - Konrad Adenauer

"I am a Berliner" - John F. Kennedy

"The wall must go!" - Willy Brandt

"We are the people!" - Monday demonstrations in East Germany

After the opening credits three events of the year are briefly shown followed by an introduction. In this we see the Earth again before the featured year is displayed and the view through the closed hallmark of the second-ranked 9 on the respective continent zooms. After this begins the actual sequence that is about the last-mentioned event. This is used as a hook for a more detailed consideration of the topic, not limited only to the year. Several of the previously mentioned issues are addressed briefly in other episodes.

The individual effects are rotated so that when taken by itself conclusive, and the knowledge from previous episodes is not necessarily required. For example, in the wake of falling to his knees in Warsaw (1970) again reported a lot about the Warsaw Ghetto, with The Boy from Warsaw (1943) having its own segment.

No known episode was made for 1902, 1904, 1905, 1908, 1910, 1915, 1921, 1931, 1935, 1950, 1952, 1957, 1971, 1973, 1984 and 1996. The year 1999 is also omitted. The years 1922, 1936, 1937, 1938, 1941, 1943, 1945, 1954, 1967, 1968, 1972, 1974, 1986 and 1991, however, had two episodes, and for 1953, three.

The zooming into the continents is usually to Europe, followed by North America and Asia. South America was rarely shown, only twice (1960 - Operation Eichmann, 1982 - The Falklands War); Antarctica and Australia are not shown at all.

== Episodes ==
The documentary is divided into ten chapters:

=== Chapter 1: World on the Move ===
- 1900 - Long Live the Century
- 1901 - The grandmother of Europe
- 1903 - The Dream of Flying
- 1906 - The Earthquake in San Francisco
- 1907 - The Magician and the Empress
- 1909 - Votes for Women!
- 1911 - The Race to the South Pole
- 1912 - The Sinking of the Titanic
- 1913 - The Last German Emperor*

=== Chapter 2: Trench Warfare ===
- 1914 - The Assassination in Sarajevo
- 1916 - The Hell of Verdun
- 1917 - The Red Revolution
- 1918 - Long Live the Republic!
- 1919 - The Dictated Peace*

=== Chapter 3: Crazy Years ===
- 1920 - The Big Prohibition*
- 1922 - Mussolini's March on Rome*
- 1922 - The Grave of Tutankhamun
- 1923 - Hitler's Coup
- 1924 - Stalin's Grip on Power
- 1925 - Chaplin in the Gold Rush*
- 1926 - The Black Venus
- 1927 - The first Atlantic flight
- 1928 - The Medicine of the Century
- 1929 - The Black Friday
- 1930 - Gandhi's Salt March
- 1932 - Weimar at its End*

=== Chapter 4: Hitler in power ===
- 1933 - Hitler's Subreption of Power
- 1934 - Mao's Long March*
- 1936 - At the Moment of Death*
- 1936 - The Beautiful Illusion
- 1937 - The Zeppelin Inferno*
- 1937 - Stalin, the Dictator
- 1938 - The Bought Peace*
- 1938 - The Pogrom Night

=== Chapter 5: Total war ===
- 1939 - The Raid
- 1940 - Hitler in Paris*
- 1941 - "Operation Barbarossa"
- 1941 - Attack on Pearl Harbor
- 1942 - Crime Scene Auschwitz*
- 1943 - Decision at Stalingrad
- 1943 - The Boy from Warsaw (was not originally aired on television)
- 1944 - The Longest Day
- 1945 - The Red Flag over the Reichstag*
- 1945 - The Bomb

=== Chapter 6: New Beginning ===
- 1946 - The Tribunal of the Victors
- 1947 - The Struggle for Israel*
- 1948 - Berlin Candy Bomber
- 1949 - Birth of the Federal Republic*
- 1951 - Churchill's Last Battle*
- 1953 - Triumph on Everest
- 1953 - The Coronation*
- 1953 - Stones Against Tanks
- 1954 - Marilyn Myth
- 1954 - The Bombing of Bikini
- 1955 - The Return of the Ten Thousand*

=== Chapter 7: Cold War ===
- 1956 - The Hungarian Uprising
- 1958 - The King of Rock 'n' Roll
- 1959 - The Victory of Fidel Castro*
- 1960 - Operation Eichmann*
- 1961 - The Shock of Berlin
- 1962 - On the Edge of Nuclear War
- 1963 - The Murder of the Century
- 1964 - Cassius Clay becomes World Champion*
- 1965 - Beatlemania*
- 1966 - The Third Goal
- 1967 - The Death of Benno Ohnesorg*
- 1967 - War in the Holy Land
- 1968 - The Fatal Shot*
- 1968 - Words Against Tanks*

=== Chapter 8: Changing World ===
- 1969 - Departure to the Moon
- 1970 - Warschauer Kniefall
- 1972 - The Girl from Vietnam
- 1972 - The Munich Massacre
- 1974 - The Chancellor Spy*
- 1974 - The Watergate Scandal
- 1975 - Escape from Saigon*
- 1976 - Uprising of the Children*
- 1977 - The Assignment
- 1978 - The Test-tube Baby*
- 1979 - The Power of the Ayatollah

=== Chapter 9: Reversing years ===
- 1980 - The Strike of Gdansk*
- 1981 - Shots at the Pope
- 1982 - The Falklands War*
- 1983 - Hitler's Fake Diaries
- 1985 - Patient Zero
- 1986 - The Challenger Tragedy
- 1986 - The Meltdown at Chernobyl
- 1987 - The Case Barschel*
- 1988 - The drama of Gladbeck* (was not originally aired on television)
- 1989 - The Miracle of Berlin
- 1990 - The German Unity*

=== Chapter 10: Changing World ===
- 1991 - Operation Desert Storm
- 1991 - Coup in Moscow
- 1992 - The Bosnian tragedy
- 1993 - Debacle in Somalia*
- 1994 - Mandela's victory
- 1995 - Murder in the Holy Land*
- 1997 - Death of a Princess
- 1998 - The President and the Maiden

The series has been released on DVD. The contributions marked with * are not included on the DVD release.

== See also ==
- List of German television series
