= Bilder, die die Welt bewegten =

- Country of origin: Germany

Bilder, die die Welt bewegten is a German documentary series, broadcast between 1980 and 1984 on ZDF. The title translates as Images That Changed The World. The series presented film footage of major natural disasters, technological disasters, and accidents. The series was directed and narrated by journalist Peter von Zahn.

== See also ==
- List of German television series
