= Tagebuch einer Gänsemutter =

- Country of origin: Germany

Tagebuch einer Gänsemutter (German for Diary of a Geese Mother) is a 14-episode German TV documentary from 1989 about Angelika Hofer, a woman who raised ten geese. After the geese hatch, Hofer raises them, takes them to a lake and teaches them how to fly.

== See also ==
- List of German television series
