= Einmal Prinz zu sein =

- Genre: Sitcom
- Directed by: Sven Unterwaldt; Micha Terjung
- Starring: Heinrich Schafmeister; Susanne Pätzold; Isabel Trimborn; Annette Frier; Winfried Dziallas; Sebastian Herrmann; Jochen Busse (series 4-6)
- Country of origin: Germany
- Original language: German
- No. of seasons: 1
- No. of episodes: 6

Original release
- Release: February 2001

Einmal Prinz zu sein is a German comedy television series. The film was directed by Sven Unterwaldt and Micha Terjung.

== See also ==
- List of German television series
