= Das Beste aus meinem Leben =

- Country of origin: Germany

Das Beste aus meinem Leben is a German ARD family television series. It was broadcast between 15 December 2006 and 2 February 2007.

== See also ==
- List of German television series
