= Wie schlau ist Deutschland? =

- Also known as: How Smart Is Germany?
- Genre: Gameshow / Knowledge
- Presented by: Johannes B. Kerner
- Country of origin: Germany
- No. of episodes: 9

Production
- Running time: 90 minutes

Original release
- Network: ZDF
- Release: April 5, 2007

Wie schlau ist Deutschland? ("How smart is Germany?") was an interactive TV quiz show hosted by Johannes B. Kerner. The first broadcast on ZDF was in April 2007 and ended in 2009.

== Format ==
Four celebrities were invited per broadcast. A thematically appropriate celebrity headed a team of 49 people from a professional or interest group (musicians, surfers, pilots, etc.).

As the title of the quiz program suggests, German citizens were quizzed on their knowledge of various fields and topics such as physics, medicine, or technology. Every participant was able to answer questions by phone or via the Internet on the ZDF homepage and represented the federal state from which they were participating. As many as 700,000 callers played along by phone.

After each round of questions, correct answers of the celebrities and the professional groups were calculated (in percent), as well as the phone and internet participants by their respective federal states. At the end of the program, the "professional group" with the most correct answers wins in the studio. The best federal state of participants is also chosen.

== See also ==
- List of German television series
