= Nürnberger Schnauzen =

- Country of origin: Germany

Nürnberger Schnauzen was a German television series in 2008 and 2009. The subject was Nuremberg Zoo.

== See also ==
- List of German television series
