= Der Fuchs =

- Country of origin: West Germany

Der Fuchs is a West German television series made in 1988 and aired in 1989. It was produced by Bavaria Film.

== See also ==
- List of German television series
