= Zuhause im Glück – Unser Einzug in ein neues Leben =

German television series

- Presented by: Eva Brenner; John Kosmalla; Daniel Kraft; Natalie Nguyen-TOn; Christoph Brenner
- Country of origin: Germany
- No. of seasons: 16
- No. of episodes: 235

Original release
- Network: RTL II
- Release: 4 October 2005 – 12 March 2019

Zuhause im Glück – Unser Einzug in ein neues Leben (English: Happy at home – moving into a new life) - was a German television series, which aired on RTL II at 8:15 pm every Tuesday. The first episode debuted on 4 October 2005. On 2 November 2010 the 100th episode was aired. The concept of the show is based on the US-American show Extreme Makeover: Home Edition, which was produced by the TV channel ABC. The TV show features host and interior architect Eva Brenner and architect John Kosmalla, as well as around 15 construction workers reconstruct several rooms in a participating family's home. Many of the houses had been subject to accidents or are in dire need of renovation. Each renovation takes place across an eight-day time span. The families are typically staying at a hotel and are refused access to the construction site. In 2009, the existing crew was joined by Natalie Nguyen-Ton, Christopher Brenner and Daniel Kraft, as well as a new craftsmen team.

Until 2005, the family would be given a DVD by a member of the building team during the first week of reconstruction. On this DVD, the changes underdone on their house were presented in a humorous way. Starting in 2007, this "construction message" was replaced by a "construction riddle". The host would send three items from the construction site to the hotel where the family would then pick one of those items. This way, the family was able to secure additional amenities for their newly renovated home, such as an aquarium or a fireplace.

The show features two additional segments – Der Handwerkertipp (The craftsman's tip), in which a craftsman advises the viewers on how to perform various changes around the house, such as hanging wallpaper, and Wolfgangs Baustellen-ABC (lit. Wolfgang's construction site-ABC), in which site manager Wolfgang van Eek provides a step-by-step explanation of their on-site changes. Another recurring segment was later added which sees host Eva Brenner and one of the participating family members create a smaller decorative piece for their new home. The building team has its own kitchen in shipping containers and motorhomes, which is located right to the building site and which allows them to work 24/7.

== See also ==
- List of German television series
