= Wir Deutschen =

- Country of origin: Germany
- No. of seasons: 1
- No. of episodes: 13

Production
- Running time: 13 x 43 minutes

Original release
- Network: ARD
- Release: 24 November 1991 – 16 February 1992

Wir Deutschen - Eine Reise zu den Schauplätzen der Vergangenheit (We Germans - a journey to the scenes of the past) is a 13-part documentary series first shown on German television in 1991 and 1992. The series presents a condensed history of the Germans from 300 BC to the abdication of the last Kaiser in 1918.

The series was written and directed by Bernhard Dircks and narrated (except for the final episode) by Gert Westphal. Pieces by Edvard Grieg are used as backing music.

== Episodes ==
Episode	Title	Meaning	Period
1	Römer und Germanen	Romans and Germanic peoples	300 BC - AD 400
2	Karl der Große	Charlemagne	400 - 800
3	Das neue Kaiserreich	The new empire	800 - 1100
4	Stauferzeit	The Hohenstaufen era	1100 - 1200
5	Kaiser und Kaufleute	Emperors and merchants	1200 - 1350
6	Das späte Mittelalter	The late Middle Ages	1350 - 1450
7	Luther	Luther	1450 - 1550
8	Dreißig Jahre Krieg	Thirty years of war	1550 - 1700
9	Die Zeit der Vernunft	The Age of Reason	1700 - 1789
10	Unter Napoleon	Under Napoleon	1789 - 1812
11	Biedermeier und Revolution	Biedermeier and revolution	1813 - 1848
12	Bismarck	Bismarck	1848 - 1890
13	Das Ende des Reiches	The end of the Empire	1890 - 1918
14	Die Kriege und ihre Folgen	The wars and their consequences	1918 - 1990

== See also ==
- List of German television series
