= Talk op Platt =

German television series

- Country of origin: Germany

Talk op Platt was a Low German talk show produced and broadcast by Norddeutscher Rundfunk (NDR) from 1982 to 2006, featuring over 150 episodes.

The inaugural episode, featuring Low German speakers Ewald Christophers, Dirk Römmer, and Gerlind Rosenbusch, was recorded and aired in April 1982 from Westerloy in Ammerland.

Dirk Römmer stepped down as presenter in 1991, with Uwe Michelsen hosting from 1990 to 1992. Falko Weerts joined the show in 1995, succeeding Ewald Christophers. On May 16, 2004, Kerstin Kromminga took over from Gerlind Rosenbusch.

Initially, each episode had a 90-minute runtime.

In 2003, Talk op Platt received the Heinrich Schmidt Barrien Prize.

The show was revamped in 2004, reducing the runtime to 60 minutes, moving from Sunday evenings to Sunday afternoons, and shifting away from a pure talk show format to include reportage elements.

The final broadcast was in 2006, and "Die Welt Op Platt" with Yared Dibaba and Julia Westlake was introduced as its replacement on NDR.

== See also ==
- List of German television series
