= Hundkatzemaus =

German television series

- Country of origin: Germany
- Original language: German
- No. of episodes: 804

Original release
- Network: VOX
- Release: November 17, 2001

Hundkatzemaus is a German television series dedicated to animals broadcast on the German television channel VOX, which was first aired in 2001. With around one million viewers, it is the most successful animal magazine on German television. On November 12, 2011, the 500th episode was aired.

== Reception ==
According to an evaluation from April 2015, the show has an average of one million viewers and is therefore one of the most successful animal shows in Germany in terms of ratings. The practical relevance of the stories and advice for the viewer are the core of the success. With a few exceptions, such as B. a lurid report about unproven high annual numbers of dogs and cats killed by hunters, the consequences receive positive feedback from the viewers.

For the 20th anniversary, a magazine of the same name was published from October 23, 2021, which contained highlights from the around 1000 TV episodes that have been broadcast so far. It was published by the publishing house GeraNova Bruckmann.

Due to the positive response to hundkatzemaus, a large number of similar animal magazines developed, which are also preferably broadcast on the Saturday after hundkatzemaus. One of the best-known formats is Der Hundeprofi with Martin Rütter.

== See also ==
- List of German television series
