= 2000 Jahre Christentum =

- Also known as: 2000 Years of Christianity
- Genre: History, documentary
- Country of origin: Germany
- No. of seasons: 1
- No. of episodes: 13

Production
- Running time: 45 minutes

Original release
- Release: 7 November 1999 – 20 February 2000

2000 Jahre Christentum (2000 Years of Christianity) is a German documentary series on the history of Christianity prior to the year 1999.

== Plot ==
The historical series begins with the rise of Christianity, as it spread across the world over the course of 2,000 years. Werner Herzog wrote and directed the ninth episode which shows the piety of people today, especially the descendants of the original Christian followers in Latin America. The last part of the series deals with questions of the future, which Christians often pose today.

== Production ==
The series was produced by ARD in collaboration with the Munich Tellux production company. The project was funded by the Bavarian Film and Television Fund. The individual episodes were directed by different people. Bernd Grote produced the series and won a 2000 Bavarian Television Award.

Some computer animation was used in the documentary, but most of the actual footage was filmed on location. Production costs of the series amounted to EUR 3.4 million.

The series originally aired from 7 November 1999 to 20 February 2000. It was released in 2000 on VHS and DVD in 2004. The DVD version was released with additional English and Dutch-language versions.

== See also ==
- List of German television series
