= Morgen schon =

- Country of origin: Germany

Morgen schon is a German television series.

== See also ==
- List of German television series
