= Les Gammas! Les Gammas! =

- Countries of origin: Germany; France
- No. of seasons: 3
- No. of episodes: 39

Original release
- Network: ARD; ORTF / TF1
- Release: 1974 – 1976

Les Gammas! Les Gammas! is an educational 39-episode television series teaching French as a foreign language. It was produced between 1974 and 1976 by the French broadcaster ORTF (later TF1) and the German broadcaster ARD and broadcast in several countries in the 1970s and 1980s.

The broadcasters themselves described the series as a "contribution of television to the Franco-German cultural agreement," which had been signed back in 1954. The German Christian Stehr served as the production manager, the French linguist specializing in German studies, Jean M. Zemb, was responsible for the educational content, and the series was directed by Rüdiger Graf based on a script by René Ehni.

Thanks to its innovative format, the course became a surprise hit on German television. It continues to be broadcast in reruns to this day, and the series has also been adopted by television stations in other countries across Europe, as well as in America, Africa, and Asia.

== See also ==
- List of German television series
