= Chronik der Wende =

German television series

- Country of origin: Germany

Chronik der Wende (Chronicle: The Fall) is a German television series.

== See also ==
- List of German television series
