= Die Gespenster von Flatterfels =

- Genre: Family Drama, Mystery, Comedy
- Created by: Christine Krüger and Sibylle Durian
- Country of origin: Germany
- Original language: German
- No. of seasons: 2
- No. of episodes: 26

Production
- Running time: 25 minutes

Original release
- Network: ARD
- Release: September 1992

Die Gespenster von Flatterfels is a German family, mystery television series from 1992.

== See also ==
- List of German television series
