= Flax und Krümel =

- Created by: Heinz Fülfe; Ingeburg Fülfe
- Country of origin: East Germany

Original release
- Network: Deutscher Fernsehfunk
- Release: 1955 – 1970

Flax und Krümel was an East German television series for children, broadcast between 1955 and 1970.

The series was created by puppeteers Heinz and Ingeburg Fülfe, and featured the adventures of Flax, a young boy; Krümel, a young girl; her grandmother ("Oma"); and the dog Struppi.

== See also ==
- List of German television series
