= Engel im Einsatz – mit Verona Pooth =

German television series

- Starring: Verona Pooth
- Country of origin: Germany

Engel im Einsatz – mit Verona Pooth is a German television series.

== See also ==
- List of German television series
