= Tanzalarm =

- Country of origin: Germany

Original release
- Release: 2004

Tanzalarm is a German television series. The name translates into "dance alarm". It was first aired in 2004, and is a joint venture between the KiKA and ZDF.

== See also ==
- List of German television series
