= Tegtmeier klärt auf! =

- Starring: Jürgen von Manger
- Country of origin: Germany

Tegtmeier klärt auf! is a German television series.

== See also ==
- List of German television series
