= Planète Némo =

- Country of origin: Germany

Planète Némo is a German television series.

== See also ==
- List of German television series
