= Bolzplatz-Duell =

- Country of origin: Germany

Bolzplatz-Duell is a German television series.

== See also ==
- List of German television series
