= Üb immer Treu nach Möglichkeit =

- Country of origin: Germany

Üb immer Treu nach Möglichkeit is a German television series.

== See also ==
- List of German television series
