= Sender Nordlicht =

- Genre: Children's television series, Crime, Comedy
- Created by: Dieter Mohn, Wolf Gerlach
- Country of origin: Germany

Production
- Running time: 5 minutes

Original release
- Network: ZDF
- Release: 1977

Sender Nordlicht is a German children's television series that aired on German TV station ZDF in the late 1970s. It features the Mainzelmännchen, the TV station's popular mascots who are similar to Heinzelmännchen (their name is a pun between Heinzelmännchen and Mainz, the hometown of ZDF) and combines live-action and animation.

== Plot ==
The evil boss of a pirate TV station located on a ship orders two dim-witted employees of his to kidnap the Mainzelmännchen in order to improve his channel's program.

== See also ==
- List of German television series
