= Terra X: Schliemanns Erben =

- Country of origin: Germany

Terra X: Schliemanns Erben is a German television series about history and archaeology. The original title of the documentary series was just Schliemanns Erben which translates to heirs of Schliemann, a reference to the German archaeologist Heinrich Schliemann. Later it was rebranded to Terra X, a brand used by ZDF for its documentaries.

== See also ==
- List of German television series
