= Dimension PSI =

- Country of origin: Germany

Production
- Running time: 43 minutes

Dimension PSI is a six-part German documentary series about paranormal phenomena. It first aired in 2003 on publicly owned television channel Das Erste. Each episode covers one paranormal topic respectively. Those are psychokinesis, ghosts, exorcism, telepathy, reincarnation and near death experiences.

== See also ==
- List of German television series
