= Die sechs Siebeng'scheiten =

- Country of origin: Germany

Die sechs Siebeng'scheiten was a German television series first broadcast by the ARD in 1957. It was a quiz show that had students of different schools competing against each other, one episode typically lasting 30 minutes. The program was discontinued in 1996. Until then, around 400 episodes had aired. Among others, the show was moderated by Elmar Hörig.

== See also ==
- List of German television series
