= Aus dem Tagebuch eines Minderjährigen =

- Country of origin: East Germany

Aus dem Tagebuch eines Minderjährigen is a German television series.

== See also ==
- List of German television series
