= Eisbär, Affe & Co. =

Eisbär, Affe & Co. is a German television series. The first season of the series was produced by av independents Film & TV GmbH. Friederike Barth from SWR was the editor. Instead of the originally planned 39 episodes, the first season comprised 54 episodes. An average of 1.9 million viewers watched them during the first broadcast from July 24 to October 20, 2006.

== See also ==
- List of German television series
