= Seth's Dominion =

Documentary about the cartoonist Seth

Seth’s Dominion is a 2014 National Film Board of Canada animated/live action documentary directed by Luc Chamberland about the Canadian cartoonist Seth.

== Production ==
Seth’s Dominion took Chamberland eight years to create, from conception to release. Chamberland first discovered the work of Seth—whose real name is Gregory Gallant—while he was living in London. Chamberland, who had aspired to being a comic book artist himself, was immediately drawn to the Ontario-born cartoonist's work:

Here was a Canadian comic book artist who was bringing a European sensibility to the graphic novel. He was just dealing with everyday life, but every little detail was magnified and sharpened and explored. I became an avid reader of his work.

— Luc Chamberland, Ottawa Citizen interview

Chamberland first approached Seth at a comic book conference in Montreal. At first, he didn't know whether he wanted to do a film with or about Seth. The two men discussed films that had been done in the past about cartoon artists, and agreed that they didn't want to do anything remotely similar. The breakthrough for Chamberland came when Seth gave him access to his unpublished diaries, rendered in cartoon form:

Most of the writing was about memories: what memories do to us and how they influence Seth’s own work. And with that, an idea started to form for a film about how our memories shape us. We sometimes never realize that all the turmoil and angst that we keep bottled up inside might just evaporate if we could learn to control our inner demons.

— Luc Chamberland, Ottawa Citizen interview

Chamberland worked on Seth's Dominion over a seven-year period, while teaching storyboarding and animation part-time at Concordia University and Cégep du Vieux Montréal, and doing independent commercial and TV work, including developing the pilot for the series, Wild Kratts. He would film Seth approximately once a year during this time, usually over a three-day long weekend, and work with various animation teams on the film. Chamberland estimates he could have done the film in 12 to 14 months, working full-time.

The film combines animation and live action interviews with Seth, as well as colleagues Chester Brown and Joe Matt. In an attempt to produce the aesthetics of the comic book style—as well as Seth himself, who dresses in an early 20th century style—Chamberland used film noir style lighting for interviews, and a vintage newsreel effect for live-action sequences.

== Title ==
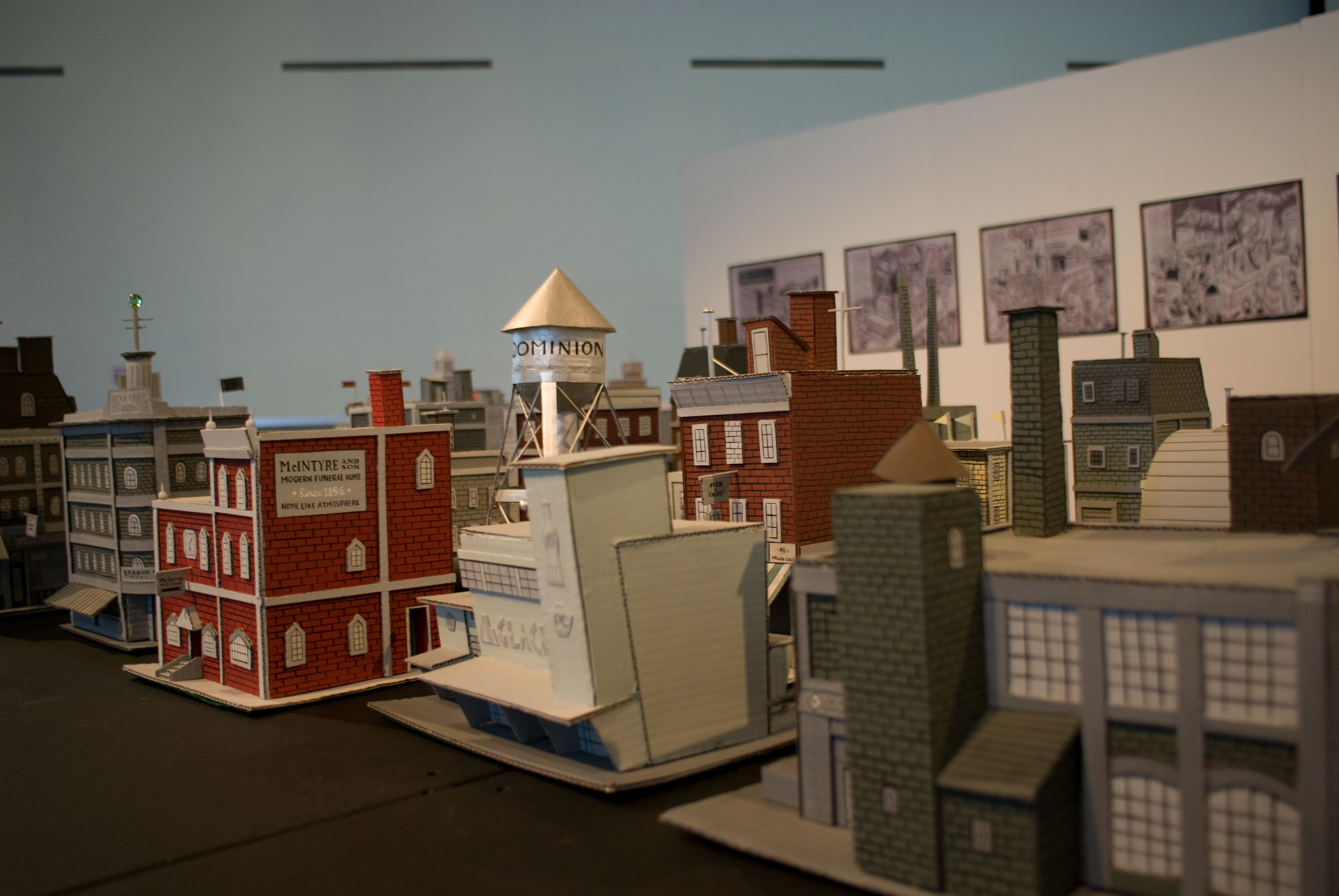
Seth's model city "Dominion" on display in Charlottetown.

The film's title is a reference both to the film subject's inner world as well as a model city named Dominion that Seth has been building for the last 10 years.

== Release ==
The film had its world premiere on September 20 at the 2014 Ottawa International Animation Film Festival, where it would receive the grand prize for best animated feature-length film. It then screened in Montreal at the Festival du nouveau cinéma. The film's first screening outside Canada was in London at the Raindance Film Festival on October 4, followed by its U.S. premiere at the 2014 Animation Breakdown festival on November 22. The German premiere of the film was on May 10, 2015, at Stuttgart International Festival for Animated Films (ITFS).

The film was released on DVD by Drawn & Quarterly in 2016, and includes additional features such as photos, interviews, and a pair of Cumberland's animated short films.
