= Le petit gnome =

- Country of origin: Germany
- No. of seasons: 1
- No. of episodes: 6

Production
- Running time: 15 minutes each

Original release
- Network: SWR Fernsehen

Le petit gnome was a German educational television series produced by SWR Fernsehen, teaching French as a foreign or second language to young German viewers aged 6 to 12 years.

== See also ==
- List of German television series
