= Hilfe, meine Familie spinnt =

- Genre: Sitcom
- Starring: Lutz Reichert; Christiane Zeiske; Katrin Lippisch; Christoph Scheermann; Silvia Rachor; Jörg-Uwe Schröder
- Opening theme: Marianne Rosenberg – Er gehört zu mir
- Country of origin: Germany
- No. of seasons: 1
- No. of episodes: 26

Production
- Running time: 25 minutes

Original release
- Network: RTL Television
- Release: 4 March – 28 December 1993

Hilfe, meine Familie spinnt (Help, my family is nuts) is a German sitcom that first aired on RTL plus on 4 March 1993. The 26-part television series is an adaptation of the American sitcom Married... with Children.

== Background ==
The series contained scripts and sets that were almost exact copies of the original American ones, lacking any cultural changes necessary to properly adapt it into German culture. Even the looks and gestures of the actors had to be exactly as those in the original US series. Further contributing to the series' failure was that Married... with Children had already premiered in Germany a year before and was broadcast daily in the afternoon while Hilfe, meine Familie spinnt was broadcast once a week in the evening, on the same station.

== Reception ==
The series was critically panned due to the poor translation and adaptation of the original scripts. German newspaper taz called it "very boring", while 20 years later in a retrospective article on the show, Der Spiegel said that it "couldn't work". Christian Richter of Quotenmeter.de called it "the probably most colourless comedy series on German television". Moviepilot.de ranked it 1st on a list of "Top 7 German comedy series crimes", commenting: "That 26 episodes of this garbage were made only shows that on German television not everything was better in the past." The series received very poor ratings and was cancelled after the 26 episodes of the first season were broadcast.

== See also ==
- List of German television series
