= Die Feuerengel =

- Genre: Drama
- Written by: Christoph Stark, Jochen Bitzer
- Starring: Nicolas König; Christoph Hemrich; Christina Greb; Jens Peter Nünemann; Hans-Martin Stier; Steffen Münster; Michael Härle; Katinka Heichert; Henry König; Karl Knaup
- Music by: Whitehouse Studios
- Country of origin: Germany
- Original language: German
- No. of seasons: 1
- No. of episodes: 13

Production
- Producers: Georg Althammer, Harald Wigankow
- Running time: 45 minutes
- Production company: Monaco Film GmbH

Original release
- Network: RTL
- Release: 22 September 1997 – 2003

Die Feuerengel is a German drama television series consisting of 13 episodes. The series was created by Monaco Film GmbH exclusively for RTL, and takes place within the confines of a fictional fire station known as the "Citywache" in the city of Hamburg.

== Plot ==
The storyline of Der Feuerengel revolves around a group of seven firefighters stationed at a fire station. Aside from their day-to-day work tasks, the series follows the firefighters as they navigate the complexities of their personal lives. The arrival of Christian Ohmke, the newly appointed platoon leader of the well-established operations department at the Hamburg city station, brings about unexpected changes. Initially met with skepticism by his colleagues, Ohmke manages to win them over by showcasing his expertise and fair conduct. This proves to be a challenging feat, considering that Theo Grabowski, a fellow firefighter who had aspirations for the same leadership position, is greatly respected by his colleagues for his own expertise and reliability.

The team consists of firefighters Karl-Heinz Erlenkamp, Harry Kast, Alexander Strasser, who, unlike his comrades, is a bit of an outsider who lacks any remarkable skill or athleticism, Markus Hoffmann, who is a willing risk-taker, and his father Wilfried. In addition, there is Susanne Schulte, the sole female member of the group. Schulte possesses a unique ability to comfort children or tend to burn victims.

== Cast and characters ==
- Nicolas König as Christian Ohmke
- Christoph Hemrich as Theo Grabowski
- Christina Greb as Susanne Schulte
- Jens Peter Nünemann as Markus Hoffman
- Hans-Martin Stier as Karlheinz Erlenkamp
- Steffen Münster as Alexander Strasser
- Michael Härle as Harry Kast
- Katinka Heichert as Elena Boikowa
- Henry König as Wilfried Hoffmann
- Karl Knaup as Matthias Bünting

== Episodes ==
1. "Kronprinzen" as (English: "Crown Princes")
2. "Feuertaufe" as (English: "Batism of Fire")
3. "Im Mittelpunkt" as (English: "Centre Stage")
4. "Einer von uns" as (English: "One of Us")
5. "Die Neue" as (English: "The New Girl")
6. "Theorie und Praxis" as (English: "Theory and Practice")
7. "Doppelbelastung" as (English: "Double burden")
8. "Aus dem Ruder" as (English: "Out of Control")
9. "Annäherungen" as (English: "Approaches")
10. "Unter Druck" as (English: "Under Pressure")
11. "Prüfungen" as (English: "Tests")
12. "Unter Strom" as (English: "Under Power")
13. "Anfang und Ende" as (English: "Beginning and End")

== Release ==
The television series was originally aired on RTL on 22 September 1997, occupying a prime time slot on Mondays. However, due to falling short of anticipated ratings, further seasons were not created.

The show was rebroadcast on RTL in 2000 and 2001, and on Super RTL in 2003. Since this time, Der Feuerengel has not been featured on any German free-to-air TV channels.

In autumn 2009, the entire series became available on DVD.

== See also ==
- List of German television series
