= Sie kommen aus Agarthi =

- Country of origin: Germany

Sie kommen aus Agarthi is a German television series.

== See also ==
- List of German television series
