= Ein Mann am Zug =

- Country of origin: Germany

Ein Mann am Zug is a German television series. After the 90-minute pilot film was broadcast on September 20, 1993, the remaining 15 episodes were broadcast weekly on ZDF from September 23, 1993 to December 30, 1993.

== See also ==
- List of German television series
