= Ron und Tanja =

- Country of origin: Germany
- No. of seasons: 1
- No. of episodes: 6

Original release
- Network: ZDF
- Release: 25 December – 30 December 1990

Ron und Tanja is a German television series. It originally aired as the ZDF Christmas series between 25-30 December 1990.

== See also ==
- List of German television series
