= Wolf, Bär & Co =

- Country of origin: Germany

Wolf, Bär & Co is a German television series.

Like its role model Elephant, Tiger & Co., the 40-episode series offers a look behind the scenes and accompanies vets and keepers in their daily work. Actor Josef Tratnik lent his voice to the stories of Wolf, Bear & Co. The episodes were filmed from March to September 2006 and are each around 50 minutes long. The series was produced by NDR Naturfilm and Studio Hamburg Documentaries, with Nadja Frenz and Tom Synnatzschke in charge. The editors were Holger Hermesmeyer and Ole Kampovski from NDR. Jörn Röver from NDR Naturfilm and Angelika Paetow from NDR were in charge of production. The episodes were created by the authors Heiko De Groot, Michael Kain, Ilka Kettner, Bernd Kosslik, Christina Krätzig, Dunja Stamer, Thomas Röschner and Heike Nikolaus. The music was composed by Clemens Winterhalter.

== See also ==
- List of German television series
