= Papageien, Palmen & Co. =

- Country of origin: Germany

Papageien, Palmen & Co. is a German television series.

== See also ==
- List of German television series
