= Hals über Kopf =

- Country of origin: Germany
- No. of seasons: 1
- No. of episodes: 34 (list of episodes)

Hals über Kopf is a German television comedy series for children and teenagers, produced by ZDF starting in 1986; it consists of a pilot film and 34 episodes, each 30 minutes long. The plot took place in West Berlin. The episodes generally centered on the disappearance of a child, who would then be found again under chaotic and amusing circumstances. The most prominent role was played by Wolfgang Gruner as Police Sergeant Hund, who was invariably involved in the missing-persons cases and whose attempts to solve them usually only added to the general confusion. Each episode invariably featured at least one arrest, accompanied by the catchphrase: “This isn’t going to be cheap!” as well as his official vehicle, a Citroën 2CV, bearing the distinctive inscription “Polente”, a german mocking word for Police combined with the german nickname for the Citroën 2CV "Ente", meaning duck.

== See also ==
- List of German television series
