= Niedrig und Kuhnt – Kommissare ermitteln =

- Country of origin: Germany
- No. of seasons: 11
- No. of episodes: 1942

Original release
- Release: 2003 – 2014

Niedrig und Kuhnt – Kommissare ermitteln is a German television series.

== See also ==
- List of German television series
