= DIE SNOBS – Sie können auch ohne Dich =

- Starring: Christian Ulmen
- Country of origin: Germany

DIE SNOBS – Sie können auch ohne Dich is a German television series starring Christian Ulmen, Wilfried Hochholdinger.

== See also ==
- List of German television series
