= Headnut.tv =

- Country of origin: Germany

Headnut.tv is a German television series.

== See also ==
- List of German television series
