= Rußige Zeiten =

- Country of origin: Germany

Rußige Zeiten is a German television series.

== See also ==
- List of German television series
