= Rote Bergsteiger (TV series) =

- Country of origin: East Germany

Rote Bergsteiger ("Red Mountaineers") is an East German television series.

== See also ==
- List of German television series
