= Alle zusammen – jeder für sich =

- Also known as: All Together - Every Man for Himself
- Country of origin: Germany

Alle zusammen – jeder für sich (All Together - Every Man for Himself) was a German television soap opera series which aired on RTL II between 25 November 1996 and 30 October 1997. 230 episodes were produced by Grundy UFA.

== See also ==
- List of German television series
