= Familie Schölermann =

- Country of origin: Germany

Familie Schölermann is a German television series.
