= Willkommen bei Mario Barth =

- Country of origin: Germany

Willkommen bei Mario Barth-Episoden is a German television series.

== See also ==
- List of German television series
