= Berliner Schnauzen =

- Country of origin: Germany

Berliner Schnauzen is a German docu-soap covering life in Berlin Zoo, aired on ZDF since 6 March 2006.

== See also ==
- List of German television series
