= Der kleine Ritter Trenk =

German television series

- Genre: Adventure
- Based on: Der kleine Ritter Trenk by Kirsten Boie
- Written by: Eckart Fingberg, John Chambers, Ishel U. Eichler, Jens Maria Merz, Stefanie Schütz
- Directed by: Eckart Fingberg
- Composers: Sebastian Horn, Leonhard Schwarz
- Country of origin: Germany
- Original language: German
- No. of seasons: 2
- No. of episodes: 26

Production
- Running time: 26 x 22 minutes
- Production companies: blue eyes Fiction and WunderWerk

Original release
- Release: April 7, 2011 – June 12, 2012

Der kleine Ritter Trenk (English: The little Knight Trenk) is a German television series.

== Characters ==
- Trenk Tausendschlag (voiced by Can Schneider in the German version) - A brave and courageous nine-year-old peasant boy who left his home to earn his fortune so he can save his family from the unjust rule of Sir Wertholt. He soon gets an opportunity to train under and kindly knight named Sir Hans as a page and become a knight himself. However to do this he has to keep is identity as a peasant boy a secret.
- Thekla (voiced by Imogen Burrell in the German version) - A fun-loving and adventurous castle maiden and daughter of Sir Hans who is about Trenk's age. An ace with a pea-shooting slingshot, Thekla's dream is to become a knight herself rather than the typical activities of a maiden. So when she meets Trenk and sees he's not really her cousin she keeps the secret, but in exchange she convinces him to teach her everything he learns.
- Piggeldy (German: Ferkelchen) - Trenk and his family's young piglet and companion.
- Sir Hans (voiced by Hartmut Neugebauer in the German version) - The kindly knight and lord of Castle Hohenlob and the surrounding land and father of Thekla.
- Momme Mumm (voiced by Domenic Redl in the German version) - A traveling trickster and juggler whom Trenk befriends on his first outing. He and his troupe often help Trenk and Thekla whenever they're in a tight spot.
- Sir Wertholt (voiced by Ekkehardt Belle in the German version) - An evil and unjust knight who oppresses both his men and his serfs including Trenk and his family.
- Mattes and Veit (voiced by Dirk Galuba and Tobias Lelle respectively in the German version) - Two of Sir Wertholt's followers who often do grunt work for the knight.
- Linhard (voiced by Patrick Roche in the German version) - A twelve-year-old page under Sir Wertholt and a rival to Trenk.
- Haug and Martha Tausendschlag - Trenk's father and mother.
- Mia Mina Tausendschlag - Trenk's little sister.
- Sir Dietz - A knight from Castle Durgelstein who is also Sir Hans' brother-in-law and father of Zink. When he meets Trenk, he offers to allow Trenk and Zink switch places so that Trenk can receive training with Sir Hans instead.
- Zink (voiced by Jacob Hofmann in the German version) - Sir Dietz' somewhat cowardly son who does not want to be a knight like his father. When he and Trenk meet, the two switch places so that Trenk can receive training in his place.
- Chaplain (German: Kaplan; voiced by Philipp Rafferty in the German version) - The priest at Castle Hohenlob and teacher to Trenk and Thekla.
- Dorothea (voiced by Lili Zahavi in the German version) - The young daughter of the prince.

== Episode list ==
=== Season 1 (2011) ===
Thirteen Episodes

No. overall	No. in season	Title	Written by	Original release date
1	1	"Leaving Home" "Aufbruch in der Nacht"	Jens Maria Merz	April 7, 2011
2	2	"The Piggeldy Wizard" "Der Ferkeltrick"	Jens Maria Merz	April 8, 2011
3	3	"Under Attack" "Überfall auf die Burg"	Jens Maria Merz	April 9, 2011
4	4	"The Ambush" "Die Räuberfalle"	Stefanie Schütz	April 10, 2011
5	5	"Marriage Vows" "Das Heiratsversprechen"	Ishel U. Eichler	April 11, 2011
6	6	"The Thief Snare" "Diebesjagd"	Stefanie Schütz	April 12, 2011
7	7	"The Performance" "Gauklerspiele"	Ishel U. Eichler	April 13, 2011
8	8	"A Secret Homecoming" "Heimliche Heimkehr"	John Chambers	April 14, 2011
9	9	"Courtly Love" "Der Minnewettstreit"	Stefanie Schütz	April 15, 2011
10	10	"The Prophecy" "Die Prophezeiung"	Ishel U. Eichler	April 16, 2011
11	11	"Dragonfire" "Drachenfeuer"	John Chambers	April 17, 2011
12	12	"Witches Brew" "Der Hexentrank"	Michael Mädel and Eckart Fingberg	April 18, 2011
13	13	"The Great Tournament" "Das große Turnier"	Michael Mädel and Eckart Fingberg	April 19, 2011

=== Season 2 (2012) ===
Thirteen episodes

No. overall	No. in season	Title	Written by	Original release date
14	1	"Thekla is Kidnapped" "Thekla wird entführt"	Stefanie Schütz	May 31, 2012
15	2	"The Monk's Potion" "Verrat im Kloster"	Jens Maria Merz	June 1, 2012
16	3	"Caught in the Trap" "In der Bärenfalle"	Stefanie Schütz	June 2, 2012
17	4	"The Pages' Tournament" "Der Pagenwettstreit"	Eckart Fingberg	June 3, 2012
18	5	"The Holy Chalice" "Der heilige Kelch"	Ishel U. Eichler and Eckart Fingberg	June 4, 2012
19	6	"Knight for a Night" "Burgherr für eine Nacht"	John Chambers	June 5, 2012
20	7	"Piggeldy in Jeopardy" "Ferkelchen in Gefahr"	Jens Maria Merz and John Chambers	June 6, 2012
21	8	"A Friend in Need" "Ein Freund am Pranger"	Ishel U. Eichler and John Chambers	June 7, 2012
22	9	"The Wrong Peasant Boy" "Der falsche Bauernsohn"	Eckart Fingberg and John Chambers	June 8, 2012
23	10	"Mia Mina in Trouble" "Mia Mina in Not"	Stefanie Schütz	June 9, 2012
24	11	"Hohenlob Besieged" "Angriff auf Hohenlob"	John Chambers	June 10, 2012
25	12	"In Dragonwood" "Im Drachenwald"	John Chambers	June 11, 2012
26	13	"A Prince's Word" "Das Versprechen des Fürsten"	John Chambers	June 12, 2012

== 2015 film ==
There is also a 2015 film.
