= Giraffe, Erdmännchen & Co. =

- Country of origin: Germany

Giraffe, Erdmännchen & Co. is a German television series.
