= Die Graslöwen =

- Country of origin: Germany

Die Graslöwen is a German television series.

== See also ==
- List of German television series
