= Familie Bergmann =

- Country of origin: Germany

Familie Bergmann is a West German television series.

== See also ==
- List of German television series
