= Münchener Freiheit (TV series) =

- Country of origin: Germany

Original release
- Network: ZDF
- Release: 29 December 1985 – 1986

Münchener Freiheit is a German 1985 television series directed by Jörg Grünler that was broadcast on ZDF in 7 episodes with each episode lasting 45 minutes. The lead role of Ludwig Appler is played by Reiner Horst Scheibe. The music was written by Mick Baumeister.

It tells the story of Ludwig Appler, a resettler from the German Democratic Republic in the German Federal Republic, where he works as a construction manager on various construction sites. Since he is constantly on the move, he confines himself to a life in the workplace. He has no own family, has no permanent residence, and lives in the trailer. One day, however, his life changes dramatically. His company goes broke, he loses his job and is plagued by financial difficulties, leading to bankruptcy and homelessness. Desperately, he strolls through everyday life, in search of a way out. Finally, he gets to know the homeless on Münchner Freiheit square. Bound by a similar fate, he suddenly feels a connection to them and joins them, learning how to make record and defy the adversities of hard life on the margins of society.

== Cast ==
- Reiner Horst Scheibe as Ludwig Appler
- Ilona Grandke as Anna Zechlin
- Erich Will as Franz
- Tilo Prückner as Alex
- Billie Zöckler as Margie

== Episodes ==
1. "Aus heiterem Himmel"
2. "Heimwärts"
3. "Abgesoffen"
4. "Bombenstimmung"
5. "Plattenwechsel"
6. "Hürdenlauf"
7. "Zur Feier des Tages"

== See also ==
- List of German television series
