= Gott sei dank ... dass Sie da sind! =

German television series

- Country of origin: Germany

Original release
- Release: 2006 – 2007

Gott sei dank ... dass Sie da sind! is a German television series, based on the Australian comedy program Thank God You're Here.

== See also ==
- List of German television series
