= Die Autohändler =

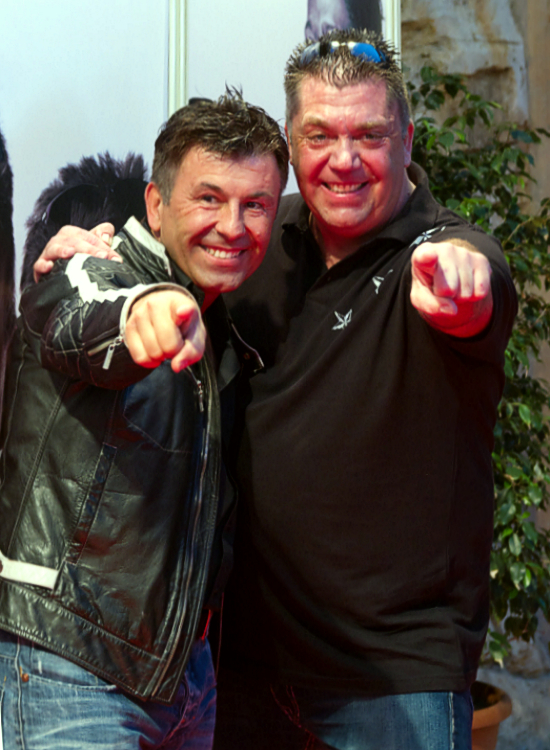
- Country of origin: Germany

Die Autohändler is a German mockumentary television series, broadcast since 2003 on RTL. The content for script is generally entertaining stories of car salesmen taking part in a fake documentary series.
