= Der kleine Mönch =

- Starring: Dirk Bach
- Country of origin: Germany

Der kleine Mönch is a German television series.

== See also ==
- List of German television series
