= El tonno =

- Country of origin: Germany
- No. of episodes: 34

Production
- Production company: Brainpool TV

Original release
- Network: ProSieben
- Release: 14 March 2002 – 27 March 2003

El tonno is a German animated short series created by German comedian Elton. It was broadcast as part of his late-night talk show elton.tv on ProSieben.
