= Krügers Woche =

- Starring: Mike Krüger
- Country of origin: Germany

Krügers Woche is a German television series.
