= Leopard, Seebär & Co. =

- Country of origin: Germany

Leopard, Seebär & Co. is a German television series.
