= Der kleine Doktor =

- Based on: Short stories by Georges Simenon
- Starring: Peer Schmidt
- Country of origin: Germany

Der kleine Doktor is a German television series.

== See also ==
- List of German television series
