= Tierisch Kölsch =

- Country of origin: Germany

Tierisch Kölsch - Tales From the Domstadt Zoo, is a German television/documentary series. It was broadcast by the ZDF for nine seasons, from 2006-2010. Tierisch Kölsch presents the behind-the-scene stories of the Domstadt zoo, including both animal and employee stories.

== See also ==
- List of German television series
