= Irina Korschunow =

German writer (1925–2013)

- Born: 31 December 1925; Stendal, Germany
- Died: 31 December 2013 (aged 88)
- Writing career
- Language: German

Irina Korschunow (31 December 1925 – 31 December 2013) was a German writer. Her oeuvre comprises short stories, novels theatrical works and film scripts. Born in Stendal, she started her career as a journalist and writer for children's books and young adult literature but focused predominantly on writing novels in her later years since about 1983. She was also a translator.

== Career ==
She studied German, Drama, Social Sciences, and English. In the 1950s she became a journalist and author. She lived in Munich.

== Awards ==
- 1977 Toucan Prize
- 1985 Silberner Griffel
- 1987 Roswitha Prize
- 2004 Hertha Koenig-Prize For Literature

== Bibliography (German titles) ==
=== Children's literature ===
- Die Wawuschels mit den grünen Haaren (1967)
- Neues von den Wawuschels mit den grünen Haaren (1969)
- Wenn ein Unugunu kommt (1976)
- Eigentlich war es ein schöner Tag. Tinas aufregende Erlebnisse (1977)
- Hanno malt sich einen Drachen (1978)
- Tim und Großvaters Pferd (1979)
- Deshalb heiße ich Starker Bär (1981), als Ravensburger Taschenbuch: Mit Illustrationen von Hansjörg Langenfass, Otto Maier Verlag, Ravensburg, 1983, ISBN 3-473-38883-1.
- Der Findefuchs (1982)
- Fränzchen Dudel sucht einen Schatz, mit Zeichnungen von Sandy Nightingale. Parabel Verlag, Schwäbisch Hall 1985, ISBN 3-7898-0245-X
- Jaga und der Kleine Mann mit der Flöte (1983)
- Kleiner Pelz (1984)
- Töktök und der blaue Riese (Neuauflage 1985)
- Kleiner Pelz will größer werden (1986)
- Wuschelbär (1990)
- Der bunte Hund, das schwarze Schaf und der Angsthase (1992)
- Steffis roter Luftballon (1994)
- Benni und die Mumpshexe mit Bildern von Regina Kehn. Arena Verlag, 1994. ISBN 978-3-401044958.
- Der kleine Clown Pippo (Neuauflage 1996)
- Es muss auch kleine Riesen geben (1997)
- Niki aus dem 10. Stock (Originalausgabe erschien 1973, Neuauflage 1997)

=== Young adult fiction ===
- Die Sache mit Christoph (1978)
- Er hieß Jan (1979)
- Ein Anruf von Sebastian (1981)

=== Novels ===
- Glück hat seinen Preis, Roman. Hoffmann und Campe Verlag (1983)
- Der Eulenruf, Hoffmann und Campe Verlag (1985)
- Malenka, Hoffmann und Campe Verlag (1987)
- Fallschirmseide, Hoffmann und Campe Verlag (1990)
- Das Spiegelbild, Hoffmann und Campe Verlag (1992)
- Ebbe und Flut, Hoffmann und Campe Verlag (1995)
- Von Juni zu Juni, Hoffmann und Campe Verlag (1999)
- Das Luftkind, Hoffmann und Campe Verlag (2003)
- Langsamer Abschied, Hoffmann und Campe Verlag (2009)

=== Film scripts ===
- Der Führerschein (TV, 1978)
- Der Urlaub (TV, 1980)
- Wie es geschah (TV, 1983)
- Der Hochzeitstag (TV, 1985)
- Michas Flucht (TV, 1988)
