= Wie erziehe ich meine Eltern? =

- Country of origin: Germany

Wie erziehe ich meine Eltern? is a German television series.

== See also ==
- List of German television series
