= Reläxx =

- Created by: vision X film- und fernsehproduktion GmbH
- Starring: Karsten Blumenthal, Marc Langebeck, Kathrin Freihube
- Country of origin: Germany

Production
- Running time: 20 minutes

Original release
- Release: 1997 – 2008

Reläxx is a German television series.

Reläxx was a weekly kids- and youth magazine that was broadcast on KI.KA from 1997 to 2008. Between 1997 and 2006 it was produced by UFA Entertainment GmbH and since 2007 by X Film- und Fernsehproduktion GmbH on behalf of the German television channel rbb.

== The programme ==
Reläxx was a leisure-time programme for kids and teenagers. Each episode lasted 20 minutes (previously 15 minutes) and had a different key subject. There was a wide range of topics. Beside background reports about e.g. the festival Berlinale, the programme also showed portraits of young actors and as well reportages on special sports. There were reports like “Fänn-Kursen” and “Äxxclusiv” and furthermore there were the two pretty unconventional actors Professor Dr. Marcowitsch (played by von Langenbeck himself) and M.C. Matzke (played by Kathrin Matzke, who also played this self-created role in the last episodes of the youth programme elf99). Both characters made the programme more relaxed with the help of comedy.

The trend-magazine was presented with a new design and in 16:9 widescreen format since its 500. episode in September 2007. As well as the title song, which was changed from “Frankie Goes To Hollywood” to Mika’s song “Relax, Take It Easy”. A Labrador-dog called “Mäxx” was as well a part of the programme since its relaunch. Since 2009 the programme was cancelled.

== Awards ==
The programme received the award “Goldener Spatz” four times. In 2008, Reläxx received this award for the best entertaining performance. The programme had received the award for entertainment already in 1999. Karsten Blumenthal received in the same year the special award for individual achievement and innovation as well as the award for moderation. The same award was handed out to him again in 2011.
