= Flugstaffel Meinecke =

German television series

- Country of origin: East Germany
- No. of seasons: 1
- No. of episodes: 7

Original release
- Release: January 5, 1990

Flugstaffel Meinecke is a German television series produced in 1989 and first aired in 1990.
