= 1981 in German television =

This is a list of German television related events from 1981.

== Events ==
- 28 February - Lena Valaitis is selected to represent Germany at the 1981 Eurovision Song Contest with her song "Johnny Blue". She is selected to be the twenty-sixth German Eurovision entry during Ein Lied für Dublin held at the BR Studios in Munich.

== Debuts ==
=== ARD ===
- 27 March – Tour de Ruhr (1981)
- 29 July – Kumpel mit Chauffeur (1981)
- 19 September – Geantwortet wird immer (1981)
- 29 September – Goldene Zeiten – Bittere Zeiten (1981–1984)
- 14 October – Die Knapp-Familie (1981–1983)
- 16 October – Cockpit (1981)
- 27 October – Die Laurents (1981)
- 3 November – Drunter und Drüber (1981)
- 16 November – Der Gerichtsvollzieher (1981)
- Unknown – Kintopp Kintopp (1981)

=== ZDF ===
- 3 January –
  - Sternensommer (1981)
  - Ein zauberhaftes Biest (1981)
- 18 January – Tod eines Schülers (1981)
- 30 January – Tegtmeier klärt auf (1981–1983)
- 5 February – Erben will gelernt sein (1981)
- 14 February – Wetten, dass..? (1981–2014)
- 2 April – Frau über vierzig (1981)
- 11 May – Der Fuchs von Övelgönne (1981)
- 11 September – Ein Fall für zwei (1981–present)
- 17 September – Onkel & Co (1981)
- 20 September – Der Fall Maurizius (1981)
- 22 November – Das Traumschiff (1981–present)
- 25 December – Silas (1981)

=== DFF ===
- 1 January – Das große Abenteuer des Kaspar Schmeck (1981)
- 2 January – Hochhausgeschichten (1981)
- 17 April – Verflucht und geliebt (1981)
- 26 June – Ein Engel im Taxi (1981)
- 23 October – Jockei Monika (1981)
- 19 December – Feuerdrachen (1981)
- 25 December – Der ungebetene Gast (1981)

=== International ===
- 30 June - (United States) Dallas (1978-1991) (Das Erste)

=== Armed Forces Network ===
- (United States) Hill Street Blues (1981-1987)

== Television shows ==
=== 1950s ===
- Tagesschau (1952–present)

=== 1960s ===
- heute (1963-present)

=== 1970s ===
- heute-journal (1978-present)
- Tagesthemen (1978-present)

== Ending this year ==
- 11 November - Sun, Wine and Hard Nuts (1977-1981)

== Births ==
- 14 November - Janin Reinhardt, TV host & actress
