= Timm Thaler =

Timm Thaler may refer to:

- Timm Thaler (novel), 1962 children's novel written by James Krüss
- Timm Thaler (1979 TV series), starring Tommi Ohrner and Horst Frank, based on the 1962 novel
- Timm Thaler (2002 TV series), animated television series based on the 1962 novel
