= Anita Kupsch =

German actress (1940–2025)

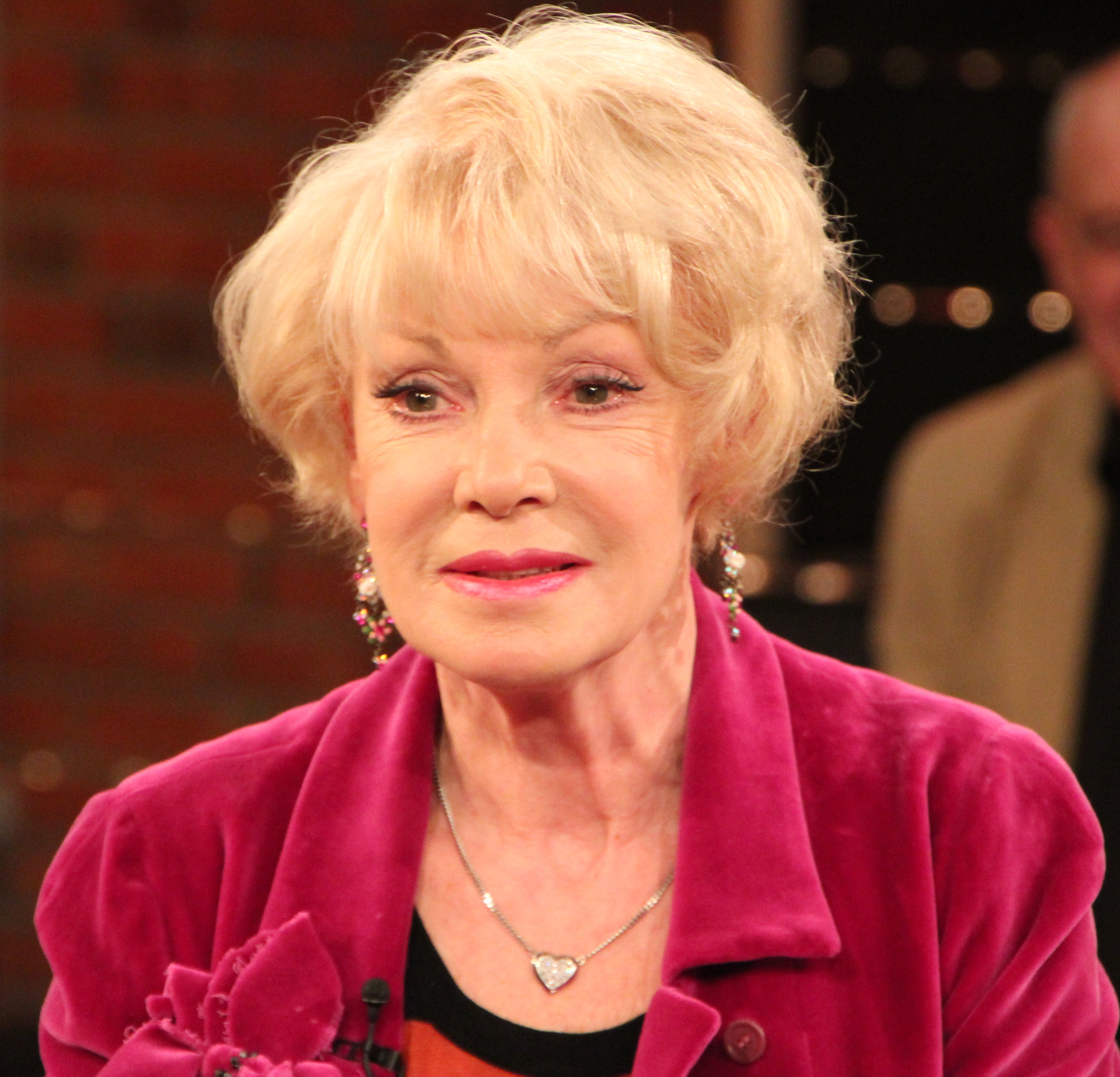
- Kupsch in 2011
- Born: 18 May 1940; Berlin, Germany
- Died: 3 July 2025 (aged 85); Berlin, Germany
- Occupation: Actress
- Years active: 1960–2017

Anita Kupsch (18 May 1940 – 3 July 2025) was a German actress who specialised in dubbing.

== Life and career ==
Born in Berlin on 18 May 1940, Kupsch's father owned a scrap metal shop. She attended beauty school while also learning ballet and jazz, taught by Tatjana Gsovsky. She then began performing at the likes of the Hebbel-Theater and the Hamburg Kammerspiele. In 1962, she appeared in Escape from East Berlin. She appeared in numerous other films while also working extensively in dubbing, serving as the voice to prominent actresses such as Goldie Hawn, Liza Minnelli, Kim Cattrall, and Amanda Barrie.

In her later years, Kupsch suffered from cancer and dementia. She died on 3 July 2025, at the age of 85.

== Filmography ==
- Ingeborg (1960)
- Escape from East Berlin (1962)
- Der Kaiser vom Alexanderplatz (1964, TV film)
- Kubinke (1966, TV film)
- Rheinsberg (1967)
- Helgalein (1969)
- Okay S.I.R. (1973–1974, TV series, 32 episodes)
- Alfie (1973, TV film)
- Lokaltermin: Dein Eid ist Meineid (1973, TV series episode)
- Hamburg Transit: Der Beschützer (1973, TV series episode)
- One or the Other of Us (1974)
- Mensch Mutter (1977, TV film)
- Tatort: Feuerzauber (1977, TV series episode)
- Vorhang auf, wir spielen Mord (1978, TV film)
- Ein Mann will nach oben (1978, TV series, 4 episodes)
- Sternensommer (1980, TV series, 5 episodes)
- Tatort: Beweisaufnahme (1981, TV series episode)
- Tatort: Peggy hat Angst (1983, TV series episode)
- Mandara (1983, TV series, 9 episodes)
- Ravioli (1984, TV series, 4 episodes)
- Cop in Drag (1984)
- Ein Heim für Tiere (1985, TV series, 2 episodes)
- Tatort: Acht, neun – aus (1985, TV series episode)
- Quadrille (1986, TV film)
- Detektivbüro Roth: Modus Operandi (1986, TV series episode)
- Geschichten aus der Heimat (1986, TV series, 1 episode)
- Praxis Bülowbogen (1987–1996, TV series, 107 episodes)
- The Sparrow Murderer (1989, TV film)
- Der Komödienstadel, Millionen im Heu (1991, TV series episode)
- Die Kommissarin: Tod im Gartenhaus (1995, TV series episode)
- Für alle Fälle Stefanie: Der erste Stein (2002, TV series episode)
