= Matthias Habich =

German actor

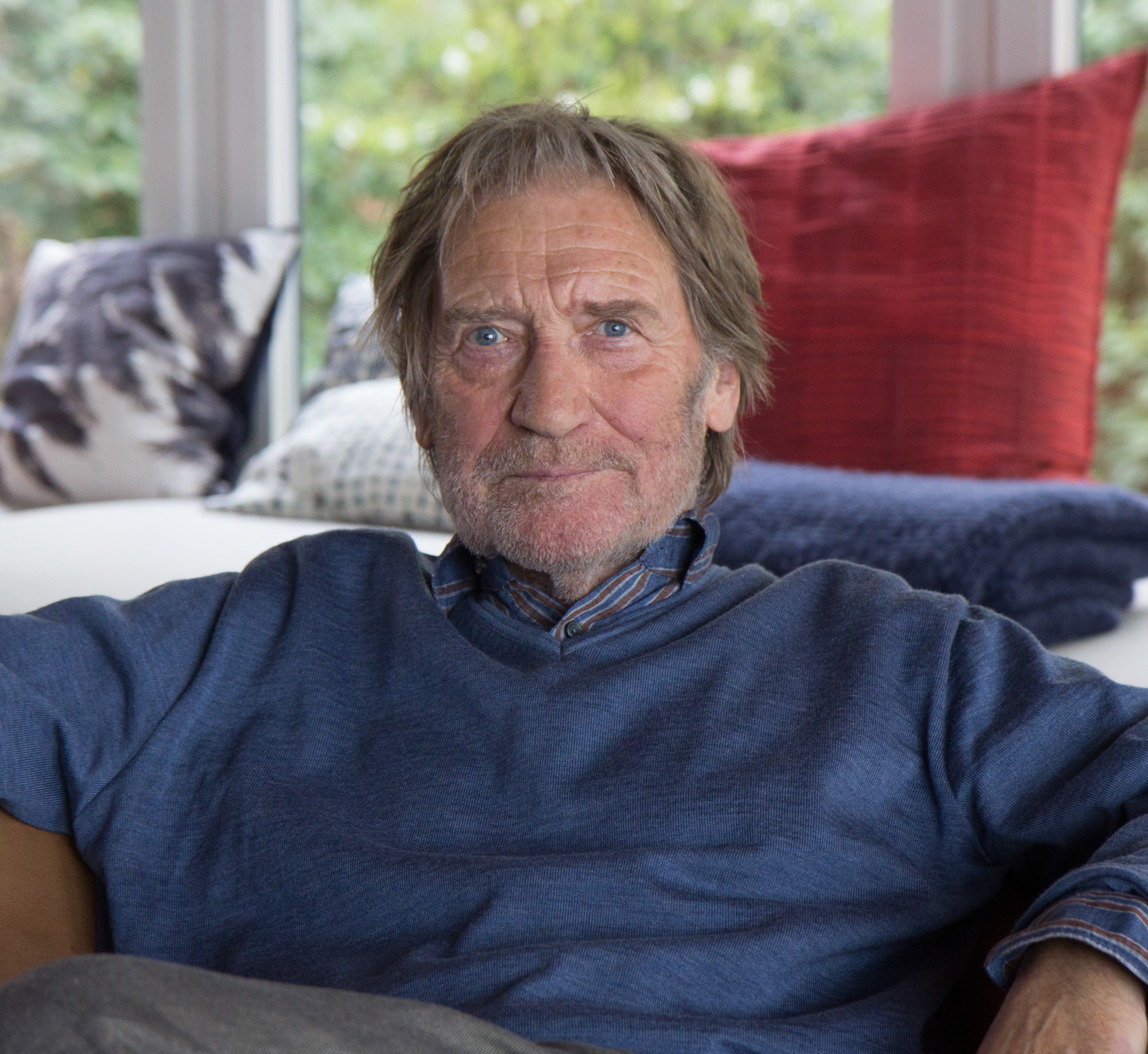
- Matthias Habich in April 2018
- Born: 12 January 1940 (age 86); Danzig, Nazi Germany (present-day Gdańsk, Poland)
- Occupation: Actor
- Years active: 1965–present

Matthias Habich (born 12 January 1940) is a German actor who has appeared in more than 110 film and television productions since 1965. Habich was born in Danzig (present-day Gdańsk, Poland) and lives in Paris.

In his career, he appeared in a number of internationally recognized films. In the 2001 film Enemy at the Gates about Stalingrad, he played the part of General (later Field Marshal) Friedrich Paulus. In the 2004 film Downfall, he portrayed Werner Haase. In the 2008 Oscar-winning drama The Reader he appeared as the father of the title character.

== Films (selection) ==
- 1973: Die merkwürdige Lebensgeschichte des Friedrich Freiherrn von der Trenck (TV miniseries, directed by Fritz Umgelter) – Friedrich von der Trenck
- 1973: Abenteuer eines Sommers (directed by Helmut Pfandler) – Michelitsch
- 1974: Im Vorhof der Wahrheit (TV film, directed by Fritz Umgelter) – Miroslav als Erwachsener
- 1975: Die unfreiwilligen Reisen des Moritz August Benjowski (TV miniseries, directed by Fritz Umgelter) – Orlov
- 1975: Abenteuerlicher Simplizissimus (TV miniseries, directed by Fritz Umgelter) – Simplex
- 1976: Fluchtgefahr (TV film, directed by Markus Imhoof) – Winarski
- 1976: Coup de Grâce (directed by Volker Schlöndorff) – Erich von Lhomond
- 1977: Maiden's War (directed by Bernhard Sinkel and Alf Brustellin) – Jan Amery
- 1977: Le Point de mire (directed by Jean-Claude Tramont) – Bruno
- 1978: Good-for-Nothing (directed by Bernhard Sinkel) – Leonard
- 1978: Ursula (TV film, directed by Egon Günther) – Zwingli
- 1980: Purity of Heart (directed by Robert van Ackeren)
- 1982: Imperative (directed by Krzysztof Zanussi) – Theologist
- 1982: Jack Holborn (TV miniseries, directed by Sigi Rothemund) – Kapitän & Richter / Captain & Lord Sharingham
- 1983: Embers (directed by Thomas Koerfer)
- 1984: Les Morfalous (directed by Henri Verneuil) – Karl
- 1987: Pink Palace, Paradise Beach (directed by Milan Dor) – Daniel
- 1987: The Cry of the Owl (TV film, directed by Tom Toelle) – Robert
- 1988: The Passenger – Welcome to Germany (directed by Thomas Brasch) – Körner
- 1988: Straight for the Heart (directed by Léa Pool) – Pierre Kurwenal
- 1988: Crash (TV film, directed by Tom Toelle) – Richard Jansen
- 1988: L'Orchestre rouge (directed by Jacques Rouffio) – Schulze-Bousen
- 1989: Noch ein Wunsch (TV film, directed by Thomas Koerfer) – Martin
- 1990: Farendj (directed by Sabine Prenczina) – Bruno
- 1990: Der Reisekamerad (TV film, directed by Ludvík Ráža) – Magnus
- 1991: Der Fall Ö. (directed by Rainer Simon) – Hauptmann / Teiresias
- 1991: The Savage Woman (La Demoiselle sauvage) (directed by Léa Pool) – Élysée
- 1992: Princesse Alexandra (TV film, directed by Denis Amar) – Franz
- 1992: Extralarge (TV series, episode: "Cannonball", directed by Enzo G. Castellari) – Dr. Shuby
- 1993: The Last U-Boat (TV film, directed by Frank Beyer) – Mellenberg – General
- 1994: Lauras Entscheidung (TV film, directed by Uwe Janson) – Joachim Böllinger
- 1995: Deutschlandlied (TV miniseries, directed by Tom Toelle) – Konrad Schuhbeck
- 1995: Noir comme le souvenir (directed by Jean-Pierre Mocky) – Chris Corday
- 1995: Das zehnte Jahr (directed by Käthe Kratz) – Max
- 1996: Slaughter of the Cock (directed by Andreas Pantzis)
- 1996: Tatort: Der kalte Tod (TV, directed by Nina Grosse) – Prof. Otto Sorensky
- 1996: Beyond Silence (directed by Caroline Link) – Gregor (Clarissa's husband)
- 1997: In the Name of Innocence (directed by Andreas Kleinert) – Kommissar Norbert Michaelis
- 1997: The Rat (TV film, directed by Martin Buchhorn) – Markus Frank
- 1997: Das Urteil (TV film, directed by Oliver Hirschbiegel) – Der Fremde
- 1998: Sugar for the Beast (TV film, directed by Markus Fischer) – Dr. Kaltenbach
- 1999: Picknick im Schnee (TV film, directed by Tomy Wigand) – Johannes Breutigam
- 1999: Klemperer – Ein Leben in Deutschland (TV series, directed by Andreas Kleinert and Kai Wessel) – Victor Klemperer
- 2000: Anniversaries (TV miniseries, directed by Margarethe von Trotta) – Heinrich Cressphal
- 2001: Boran (directed by Alexander Berner) – Boran
- 2001: Enemy at the Gates (directed by Jean-Jacques Annaud) – General Paulus
- 2001: Nowhere in Africa (directed by Caroline Link) – Walter Süßkind
- 2003: Trenck (TV film, directed by Gernot Roll) – General von Habich
- 2003: Two Days of Hope (TV film, directed by Peter Keglevic) – Otto Kaminski
- 2003: Getting a Life (directed by Vivian Naefe) – Michael Berkhoff
- 2004: Nero (TV film, directed by Paul Marcus) – Seneca
- 2004: Downfall (directed by Oliver Hirschbiegel) – Prof. Werner Haase
- 2005: Waves (TV film, directed by Vivian Naefe) – Rolf von Buttlär
- 2005: Under the Dark Sun of Africa (TV film, directed by Roland Suso Richter) – Richard – Catherine's Father
- 2005: A Witch's Kiss (TV film, directed by Diethard Küster) – Der Herr der Finsternis
- 2005: The Call of the Toad (directed by Robert Gliński) – Alexander Reschke
- 2006: Silver Wedding (TV film, directed by Matti Geschonneck) – Ben
- 2007: Afrika, mon amour (TV miniseries, directed by Carlo Rola)
- 2007: Caótica Ana (directed by Julio Medem) – Klaus
- 2008: The Reader (directed by Stephen Daldry) – Peter Berg
- 2009: Tatort: Neuland (TV, directed by Manuel Flurin Hendry) – Roland Plauer
- 2009: Ein halbes Leben (TV film, directed by Nikolaus Leytner) – Peter Grabowski
- 2009: Der Großvater (Short, directed by Nikias Chryssos)
- 2009: Ceasefire (directed by Lancelot von Naso) – Alain Laroche
- 2010: Nanga Parbat (directed by Joseph Vilsmaier) – Pfarrer
- 2010: Barriere (directed by Andreas Kleinert) – Hans Meinhold
- 2010: Last Moment (TV film, directed by Sathyan Ramesh) – Peter Romberg
- 2010: Die Schwester (TV film, directed by Margarethe von Trotta) – Gregor Antonion
- 2010: Morgen musst Du sterben (TV film, directed by Niki Stein) – Peter
- 2011: Bloch: Der Heiland (TV, directed by Franziska Meletzky) – Martin Weidner
- 2011: Eine halbe Ewigkeit (TV film, directed by Matthias Tiefenbacher) – Harry Berg
- 2012: Das Kindermädchen (TV film, directed by Carlo Rola) – Utz von Zernikow
- 2012: Und alle haben geschwiegen (TV film, directed by Dror Zahavi) – Paul
- 2012: Liebe am Fjord – Abschied von Hannah (TV film, directed by Jörg Grünler) – Henrik Agdestein
- 2013: The Taste of Apple Seeds (directed by Vivian Naefe) – Carsten Lexow
- 2014: Die Toten von Hameln (TV film, directed by Christian von Castelberg) – Dr. Georg Bischoff
- 2014: Autumn Tingles: Speed Dating for Silver Hairs (TV film, directed by Jan Georg Schütte) – Helge Löns
- 2014: Where I Belong (directed by Fritz Urschitz) – Friedrich
- 2015: The Misplaced World (directed by Margarethe von Trotta) – Paul Kromberger
- 2015: A Grand Farewell (TV film, directed by Matti Geschonneck) – Holm Hardenberg
- 2017: Berlin Syndrome (directed by Cate Shortland) – Erich
- 2020: Lassie Come Home (directed by Hanno Olderdissen) – Graf von Sprengel
