= Silvia Seidel =

German actress (1969–2012)

- Born: 23 September 1969; Munich, West Germany
- Died: 31 July 2012 (aged 42); Munich, Germany
- Citizenship: German
- Occupation: Actress

Silvia Seidel (23 September 1969 – 31 July 2012) was a German actress best known for her portrayal of Anna in the 1987 ZDF television miniseries Anna. The role made her a popular young star in Germany, though she struggled with the pressures of fame and later battled personal and professional challenges. She had a career on TV and in the theatre with varying degrees of success, but died by suicide at age 42.

== Early life and career ==
Silvia Seidel was born on 23 September 1969 in Munich, West Germany, to Wolfgang and Hannelore Seidel. She had an older stepbrother from her father's first marriage. She grew up in the Munich suburb of Harlaching. She pursued ice skating, and then trained at a ballet school in Munich. Seidel was a timid child and struggled with shyness and anxiety in school.

Seidel appeared in small theatre productions in the 1970s and 1980s, and had a small uncredited role in the 1984 film The NeverEnding Story. Her first TV role was in the TV series SOKO München in 1985, and her career took off when she was cast as Anna in the ZDF Christmas series Anna in 1987, a role that made her a household name in Germany. The series was adapted from the books by Justus Pfaue. The series attracted over 13 million viewers per episode and she became a German television star.

== Anna and German television career+ ==
Seidel's casting as Anna was the result of a nationwide search across Germany, where ballet schools held auditions for a young dancer to portray the role. Anna was a demanding series that required Seidel both to act and to perform complex ballet routines, including scenes from Swan Lake, and she did not have formal acting training.

The character of "Anna" became iconic in German television history and led to a nationwide ballet boom, inspiring thousands of girls across Germany to enroll in ballet classes Seidel's dance scenes were included in the music video for the chart-topping single "My Love Is a Tango", and as a result, she was awarded a gold record alongside Marchena. Anna was also adapted into a successful film for Christmas 1988, and Seidel won awards including a Goldene Kamera and a Bambi Award. At the 1988 Goldene Kamera awards, Seidel met Hollywood actor Kirk Douglas, who proclaimed her “the next big star in Germany.”

Seidel later spoke of the extreme pressure and scrutiny she was under during this time by the public and media. She felt she could not go to restaurants and enjoy her free time without being constantly scrutinized. Seidel was often typecast and found it difficult to secure roles that allowed her to break free from her Anna image. She struggled with anxiety throughout her life, and even at the height of her fame experienced periods of anxiety and self-doubt; she stated that without her acting career she would fall "into an emotional hole".

=== International career ===
After the success of Anna, Seidel struggled to find major roles in Germany and appeared in American, Australian, and Italian productions. She was unhappy with being typecast in Germany with the only roles being offered ballet roles, and expressed a desire to become a serious actress. Her first major role abroad was a starring role in the American film Faith (1990), one of her few appearances in an international film and a commercial failure.

In 1991, Seidel appeared in the Italian TV series Pronto soccorso with Claudio Amendola. She also appeared in the Australian TV series Halfway Across the Galaxy and Turn Left (1992), which is considered one of her major roles after her initial fame. After spending seven months filming in Australia for the 28-episode series, Seidel returned to Munich. In 1996 she played in the comedy Luise knackt den Jackpot

=== Theatre career ===
Seidel also performed on the stage where she was not typecast as the "little blonde ballerina." In 1990, Seidel received great praise for her portrayal of Belinda in the stage adaptation of the 1948 film Johnny Belinda, a role for which she had to learn sign language. In 2002, for the political satire Staatsaffairen, Seidel was nominated for the Merkur Theater Prize. She continued to work regularly in theatre, although by 2011, her appearances became less frequent as she gradually withdrew from the public eye.

== Later life and death ==
Seidel had a 3-year relationship with Uli, a man she met in a nightclub in 1994. They remained together until 1998. She then had an eight-year partnership with author Patrick McGinley, which faced challenges, particularly due to her ongoing struggles with depression. Shortly before her death, the relationship ended.

In 2007, Seidel had a role in the German soap opera Storm of Love in 2007. In 2011 she had her last major television role, portraying a ballet teacher in the SOKO München episode titled "Das Blut der Ballerina" (‘The Blood of the Ballerina’). Still, she struggled finding meaningful film and television roles, expressing anger in a 2010 interview, and again in 2012, over the lasting impact of Anna on her career.

Despite her struggles, she remained active in theatre. In her last years, Seidel worked closely with the a.gon Theatre company in Munich, with whom she worked in the last play of her life: Zusammen ist man weniger allein. Her mental health deteriorated in her final years, which was exacerbated by her father's death in September 2008, and she had financial struggles as well.

Seidel attempted suicide in late 2011 and was treated at the Max Planck Institut für Psychiatrie clinic in Munich from late 2011 until spring 2012. Her final public appearance was in April 2012 during the television show Let's Dance. Behind the scenes, she appeared cheerful and joked with others, but shortly afterward, she attempted suicide again, and her relationship with her boyfriend, Patrick McGinley, ended.

In the final weeks of her life, she was regularly seen in a bar near her apartment. On 31 July 2012, at the age of 42, she died by suicide in her Munich apartment, and lay dead in her apartment for several days, until the barmaid from her favorite bar noticed the light had been on for days. It was reported at the time that her death was due to an overdose of tablets; however, no official cause of death was ever released. She had written several farewell letters to people close to her. She is buried with her parents in an urn grave in Waldfriedhof Grünwald, Munich.

== Filmography ==
- The NeverEnding Story (1984)
- Anna (1988)
- Faith (1990)
- Mompen!? (1995) (short)
- 111 Wege eine Frau anzumachen (1995) (short)
- Luise knackt den Jackpot (1996)
- Daily Benefits (2004) (short)
- Tobi (2010) (short)

=== Television ===
- SOKO 5113 (1986–2011) (3 Episodes)
- Anna (1987)
- Anna - Eigentlich heiße ich Silvia Seidel (1989)
- Pronto soccorso (1992)
- Halfway Across the Galaxy and Turn Left (1993)
- Cluedo – Das Mörderspiel (1993)
- Ein unvergeßliches Wochenende in St. Moritz (1995)
- Parkhotel Stern (1997)
- Der Pfundskerl (2002)
- Um Himmels Willen (2002)
- Cleaning Up (2003)
- Tramitz & Friends (2004)
- Leipzig Homicide (2005)
- Siska (2006)
- Sturm der Liebe (2007)
- Unter Verdacht (2007)
- Der Alte (2007–2010) (5 Episodes)
- Die Rosenheim-Cops (2008–2011) (2 Episodes)
- SOKO Kitzbühel (2009)
- Da kommt Kalle (2009)
- In aller Freundschaft (2009)
- Forsthaus Falkenau (2011)
- Weißblaue Geschichten (2013)

=== Dubbing ===
- The Incredible Hulk (1996 TV series) (1996/1997) – [Betty Ross]
- Lewis and Clark and George (1997) – [George]
- Mansfield Park (1999 film) (1999) – [Fanny Price]
- Memento (film) (2000) – [Leonards Ehefrau]
- Dungeons & Dragons (2000 film) (2000) – [Empress Savina & Norda]
- The King Is Dancing (2000) – [Madeleine]

=== Theater ===
- Vier Frauen und ein Unfall as Heike
- 8 Frauen as Louise
- Die süßesten Früchte as Claudia
- Die Erbin as Catherine
- Romantische Komödie as Phoebe
- Ein Sommernachtstraum as Puck
- Staatsaffairen as Irene
- Sonntag in New York as Eileen
- Midsummernight-Sexcomedy as Ariel
- Bitterer Honig as Josephine
- Johnny Belinda as Belinda
- Wege mit Dir as Raika
- Zusammen ist man weniger allein as Camille
- Nie wieder arbeiten as Nicole
- Ein Fünf-Sterne-Mann as Agueda
- Frau Holle as Pechmarie
- Ein Traum von Hochzeit as Judy
- Hotel zu den zwei Welten as Marie
- Der Kreis as Catherine

=== Music video ===
- Guillermo Marchena - My Love Is a Tango (1988)
- Richard Davis - Sometime (2005)

== Discography ==
- Phantom Lover (Single) – 1990

Released to promote the film "Faith" (1990).

== Awards ==
- 1987: Goldene Kamera
- 1988: Bambi
- 1988: Telestar, Förderpreis
- 1988: BRAVO-Otto (Bronze) in the category TV Star

== Book ==
- Anna und ich. Tagebuch einer jungen Karriere. (1989)
