= Laura und Luis =

- Created by: Justus Pfaue
- Country of origin: Germany

Laura und Luis is a German television series.

== Cast ==
- Coco Winkelmann : Laura
- Jan Andres : Luis
- Relda Ridoni : Hyppolita
- Carla Monti : Mariuola
- Macha Méril : Viscida
- Claude-Oliver Rudolph : Cuozzo
- Beate Jensen : Nadja
- Damien Lechevrel : Thierry Bibi
- Vanessa Gravina : Giuliana
- Liuba Consonni : Pina
- Remo Varisco : Monsignore
- Giorgio De Giorgi : Maresciallo
- Patrick Bach : Sebastian Krass
- Dietrich Mattausch : Pater Fischer
- Roger Dumas : Fishmonger
- Charles Berling

== See also ==
- List of German television series
