= Thomas Ohrner =

German actor, singer and television host (born 1965)

- Born: 3 June 1965 (age 61); Munich, West Germany
- Other names: Tommi Ohrner; Thommy Ohrner
- Occupations: Actor, singer, television host
- Years active: 1969 - present
- Relatives: Carolin Ohrner (half-sister)

Thomas "Tommi" Ohrner (born 3 June 1965) is a German actor, singer and television host. Beginning a career as a child actor at the age of four, Ohrner rose to prominence as a teen idol during the early 1980s, starring in the television series Timm Thaler, Merlin and Manni, der Libero, as well as achieving crossover success as a singer with his English-language pop singles, "Rock 'n' Roll in Old Blue Jeans" and "5 O'Clock Rock". In the 1990s, Ohrner turned to work as a television and radio host before once again returning to acting, most notably as Matthias Brandner on the German soap opera, Verbotene Liebe.

== Early life ==
Thomas Ohrner was born on 3 June 1965 in Munich, West Germany, the son of actress Evelin Bey-Ohrner and economic adviser Claus Peter Ohrner. He has two older siblings, a half-sister, actress Carolin Ohrner, born in 1961, and a brother, Markus Ohrner, born in 1963. At the age of eight months, Ohrner began as a child model, appearing in print advertorial campaigns for baby carriages, margarine and detergent, and by the age of four, he was appearing in television commercials.

== Career ==
=== Early career ===
In 1969, Ohrner made his television debut at the age of four, guest-starring in an episode of the television crime drama, Der Kommissar and in 1970, he made his feature film debut appearing as "Bübchen" in the romantic comedy Hurra, unsere Eltern sind nicht da. He followed up with small roles in the comedy films Nachbarn sind zum Ärgern da and Hilfe, die Verwandten kommen, and in 1973, he appeared alongside his sister Carolin in the dramatic television movie Nicht einmal das halbe Leben.

Ohrner continued to appear in film and on television until 1976, when he landed his first lead role as Victor Laroche alongside his sister Carolin as Cora Laroche in the children's mystery miniseries Das Haus der Krokodile. Throughout the rest of the 1970s, Ohrner continued to make occasional television appearances as well as working as a voice actor, dubbing voices for the German broadcasts of the Japanese animated series, Heidi, Girl of the Alps and the American comedy series The Bad News Bears.

=== Teen idol ===
In 1979, Ohrner landed the lead role in the 13-part television miniseries, Timm Thaler. Based on the children's novel by James Krüss, Ohrner played the titular role of Timm Thaler, a boy who trades his enchanting laughter to a wealthy Baron in exchange for the ability to win any bet he makes. Premiering on Christmas day 1979, the series became a hit with young audiences and launched 14-year-old Ohrner as a popular teen idol of the era. In January 1980, he followed up with a starring role in the miniseries Merlin, playing the wizard as a boy.

With the popularity of Timm Thaler, Ariola Records signed Ohrner as a recording artist, releasing his first pop album, For You in 1980. The album, which featured Ohrner on vocals and electric guitar, included the popular singles, "Rock 'n' Roll in Old Blue Jeans" and "Looks Like a Heartache". After the success of For You, Ariola released Ohrner's next English album, My Name is Tommi the following year. The album included the singles "All the Girls Around the World" and "5 O'clock Rock" and cemented Ohrner's status as a teen idol with young fans.

In 1982, Ohrner followed up with the lead role in another popular teen series, Manni, der Libero which followed a teenager's adolescent struggles to become a professional soccer player. Following this success, he returned to the big screen, starring in the films, Ein dicker Hund, Die unglaublichen Abenteuer des Guru Jakob and Plem, Plem – Die Schule brennt. During this time, he also continued with his music career, releasing the German-language pop singles, "Frag' nicht so dumm", "Im Dschungel ist der Teufel los" and "Nochmal Schwein gehabt".

=== Adult career ===
In 1985, Ohrner starred in the television miniseries, Jenseits der Morgenröte (The Secret of the Black Dragon) and had a prominent role as Michael on the family drama series, Die glückliche Familie from 1987 to 1990. During this time, he also began working as a radio host on Radio Luxemburg. In the following years, he began working as a television host, serving as host of the family game show, Boing from 1990 to 1993, and as host of the teen game show Herzklopfen from 1993 to 1995, as well as becoming program director of the cable channel kabel eins in 1992.

In 1996, Ohrner began as host of the reality series Lass dich überraschen, which surprised unsuspecting audience members by granting their wishes. In 2001, Ohrner returned to kabel eins, hosting German adaptations of the American game shows Child's Play and Wheel of Fortune, as well as hosting the monthly variety show Fröhlicher Alltag from 2006 to 2008. In 2008, he returned to acting full-time, co-starring as Matthias Brandner on the German soap opera, Verbotene Liebe.

In October 2011 it was announced that Ohrner would be returning to the big screen, appearing in the feature film adaptation of Das Haus der Krokodile. The film Victor and the Secret of Crocodile Mansion was released on 21 March 2012 and, having played Victor in the original 1976 miniseries, Ohrner appeared in a cameo role, this time as Victor's father.

== Personal life ==
Ohrner lives in Munich with his second wife Marion and has fathered six children. He became the father of triplets with his first wife in 1990, two of whom died only a few days after birth; only one child, Luisa survived. He has three children with his second wife; Patrick (born in 1996), Fabian (born in 2000) and Pauline (born in 2007). In his free time, Ohrner enjoys running, swimming, wind surfing, mountain biking and skiing.

== Filmography ==
=== Film ===
- 1970: Hurra, unsere Eltern sind nicht da
- 1970: Nachbarn sind zum Ärgern da
- 1971: Hilfe, die Verwandten kommen
- 1974: Stolen Heaven
- 1982: Crazy Jungle Adventure
- 1982: Ein dicker Hund
- 1983: Die unglaublichen Abenteuer des Guru Jakob
- 1983: Plem, Plem – Die Schule brennt
- 2012: Victor and the Secret of Crocodile Mansion

=== Television ===
- 1969: Der Kommissar
- 1973: Nicht einmal das halbe Leben
- 1974: Der Kommissar
- 1975: Das Haus der Krokodile
- 1977: Brennendes Geheimnis
- 1979: Timm Thaler (The Legend of Tim Tyler)
- 1980: Merlin
- 1981: Manni, der Libero
- 1985: Jenseits der Morgenröte
- 1987–1990: Die glückliche Familie
- 1998: Varell & Decker
- 2005: Bernds Hexe
- 2008–2011: Verbotene Liebe

== Discography ==
=== Albums ===
- 1980: For You

- 1: "Rock'n Roll In Old Blue Jeans"
- 2: "Make Hay While The Sun Shines"
- 3: "Bad Boy"
- 4: "If You Go Away"
- 5: "Ticket To The Sunshine"
- 6: "I Like Every Part Of You"
- 7: "Pinball Mania"
- 8: "Looks Like A Heartache"
- 9: "Angela"
- 10: "Cindy With The Golden Hair"
- 11: "Long Live Summertime"
- 12: "For You"

- 1981: My Name is Tommi

- 1: "My Name Is Tommi"
- 2: "Sister Don´t Get Me Wrong"
- 3: "Milky Way"
- 4: "Baby It´s You"
- 5: "Rollerskate Queen"
- 6: "Try It Again"
- 7: "5 O´Clock Rock"
- 8: "Tonight"
- 9: "All The Girls Around The World"
- 10: "Mister"
- 11: "Duty"
- 12: "Run Run Run"

=== Singles ===
- 1980: "Looks Like A Heartache" / "Angela"
- 1980: "Rock'n Roll In Old Blue Jeans" / "I Like Every Part of You"
- 1981: "All The Girls Around The World" / "Baby It's You"
- 1981: "5 O'Clock Rock" / "Mister"
- 1982: "Frag' nicht so dumm" / "Wir war'n gute Freunde"
- 1982: "Im Dschungel ist der Teufel los" / "Im Dschungel ist der Teufel los" (Instrumental)
- 1983: "Nochmal Schwein gehabt" / "Dr. Rap"

== Bibliography ==
- Holmstrom, John. The Moving Picture Boy: An International Encyclopaedia from 1895 to 1995. Norwich, Michael Russell, 1996, p. 355-356.
