= The Way Back (2010 film) =

2010 American survival film by Peter Weir

- Theatrical release poster
- Directed by: Peter Weir
- Screenplay by: Peter Weir; Keith Clarke
- Based on: The Long Walk by Sławomir Rawicz
- Produced by: Peter Weir; Joni Levin; Duncan Henderson; Nigel Sinclair; Scott Rudin
- Starring: Jim Sturgess; Ed Harris; Saoirse Ronan; Colin Farrell
- Cinematography: Russell Boyd
- Edited by: Lee Smith
- Music by: Burkhard Dallwitz
- Production companies: Exclusive Media; National Geographic Films; Imagenation Abu Dhabi
- Distributed by: Newmarket Films; Wrekin Hill Entertainment; Image Entertainment
- Release dates: September 3, 2010 (Telluride); December 29, 2010 (U.S.)
- Running time: 133 minutes
- Country: United States
- Languages: English; Russian
- Budget: $30 million
- Box office: $24.2 million

The Way Back is a 2010 American epic survival drama film directed and produced by Peter Weir, from a screenplay co-written with Keith Clarke. The film is inspired by The Long Walk, the 1956 memoir of former Polish prisoner of war Sławomir Rawicz, who claimed to have escaped from a Soviet Gulag and walked 4,000 miles (6,400 km) to freedom in World War II. It stars Jim Sturgess, Colin Farrell, Ed Harris, and Saoirse Ronan, with Alexandru Potocean, Sebastian Urzendowsky, Gustaf Skarsgård, Dragoș Bucur and Mark Strong.

The film received generally positive reviews from critics and was nominated for an Oscar for Best Makeup, but lost to The Wolfman. The nomination was received by Gregory Funk, Edouard F. Henriques and Yolanda Toussieng. This was Weir's final film as director before his retirement.

== Plot ==
After the Soviet invasion of Poland in World War II, Polish army officer Janusz Wieszczek is held prisoner and interrogated by the NKVD. Unable to force a confession of espionage from him, the Soviets torture his wife until she denounces him. He is sentenced to 20 years in a Gulag labour camp in Siberia.

Janusz is imprisoned with Smith, an American engineer; Khabarov, an actor; Valka, a hardened Russian criminal; Tomasz, a Polish artist; Voss, a Latvian priest; Kazik, a Pole suffering from night blindness; and Zoran, a Yugoslav accountant. Khabarov confides a plan to escape to Mongolia, passing Lake Baikal. Smith cautions Janusz that Khabarov discusses escape plans with newcomers only to maintain his morale, but nothing will come of it. Janusz intermittently hallucinates the front door of a country home and adjoining window ledge with plants and a rock he attempts to grab for but never quite reaches.

Janusz escapes from the camp with Smith, Valka, Voss, Tomasz, Zoran, and Kazik during a severe snowstorm that covers their tracks. Kazik freezes to death two nights later after getting lost while looking for firewood. Several more days of hard travel through Siberian snow brings them to Lake Baikal where they meet Irena, a Polish girl. She tells them that Russian soldiers murdered her parents and sent her to a collective farm near Warsaw from which she escaped. Smith knows Warsaw to be occupied by the Germans, not the Soviets, but despite misgivings that she'll slow them down and tax their meager food supply, he agrees to let her accompany them. He confronts her about the lie and she admits her parents were communists who were killed, leaving her in an orphanage.

The group reaches the unpatrolled border between the Soviet Union and Mongolia, and Valka, who idolizes Joseph Stalin, refuses to cross. The rest continue to Ulaanbaatar to discover that Mongolia is under communist control. Since China is at war with Japan, he convinces the group to take refuge in British India instead and they continue south across the Gobi Desert. Lack of water, sandstorms, sunburn, blisters, and sunstroke weaken the group. They find temporary relief at a well and then lose most of their water supply in a sandstorm. The group carries on; Irena dies a few days later followed by Tomasz. Smith nearly dies but Janusz, Zoran, and Voss motivate him until the severely dehydrated men reach a new water source.

The group passes through the Great Wall into China and reach the Himalayas on the verge of death. A Tibetan monk takes them to a Buddhist monastery where they regain their strength. Smith decides to go to Lhasa with the help of one of the monk's contacts, who will smuggle him out through China so he can make contact with the US military and return to home. The remaining three reach India where villagers assist them, and the Indian government arranges their peaceful return home.

Janusz walks around the world until 1989, when the communist regime in Poland is ousted from power. 50 years after being taken captive, Janusz again envisions reaching for the rock by the door. This time he succeeds, and takes a key hidden underneath. He opens the door and is reunited with his wife.

== Cast ==
- Jim Sturgess as Janusz Wieszczek, a young Polish inmate made a prisoner of war during the Soviet invasion of Poland
- Ed Harris as Mr. Smith, an American inmate and former engineer
- Saoirse Ronan as Irena Zielińska, an orphaned teenage Polish girl trying to escape from the Soviet Union, who meets up with the fugitives near Lake Baikal
- Colin Farrell as Valka, a tough Russian inmate and gambler whose most prized possession is a knife he calls "Wolf"
- Dragoș Bucur as Zoran, a Yugoslavian inmate who used to be an accountant and is considered a funny man
- Alexandru Potocean as Tomasz Horodinsky, a Polish inmate and former pastry chef who dreams of becoming an artist
- Gustaf Skarsgård as Andrejs Voss, a Latvian inmate and former priest
- Sebastian Urzendowsky as Kazik, a young Polish inmate suffering from night blindness
- Mark Strong as Andrei Timofeyevich Khabarov, a Russian inmate and actor who was imprisoned when the play he was in was deemed subversive by Soviet authorities

== Historical background ==
The film is loosely based on The Long Walk (1956), Sławomir Rawicz's memoir depicting his alleged escape from a Siberian Gulag and subsequent 4,000-mile walk to freedom in India. The book sold over 500,000 copies and is credited with inspiring many explorers. In 2006 the BBC unearthed records (including some written by Rawicz himself) which showed that, rather than having escaped from the gulag, he had in fact been released by the USSR in 1942. Nevertheless, there is some circumstantial evidence that some sort of trek to freedom occurred, via the route outlined in the book and film. Captain Rupert Mayne, a British intelligence officer in Calcutta in 1942, interviewed three emaciated men, who claimed to have escaped from Siberia. Mayne always believed their story was the same as that of The Long Walk. So the possibility remains that someone – even if not Rawicz – achieved this extraordinary feat. Though the director Peter Weir continues to claim that the so-called long walk happened, he himself now describes The Way Back as "essentially a fictional film".

== Production ==
Laurence Harvey and Herbert Wilcox had previously announced plans to make a film from The Long Walk in 1957, though this never came to fruition.

Principal photography took place in Bulgaria, Morocco and India.

== Reception ==
Review aggregator Rotten Tomatoes reports a 74% approval rating based on 139 reviews, with an average rating of 6.88/10. The critics consensus is: "It isn't as emotionally involving as it should be, but this Peter Weir epic offers sweeping ambition and strong performances to go with its grand visual spectacle." On Metacritic, the film has a weighted average score of 66 out of 100 based on 33 critics, indicating "generally favorable reviews".

Empire awarded the film three out of five stars and wrote, "It's good, but from this director we have come to expect great." The Guardian awarded it three out of five and wrote, "Weir has put together a good film – oddly, though, considering its scale, it feels like a rather small one." The Telegraph called the film "A journey that feels awful and heroic and unfathomable – and one you'll want to watch again."

== Music ==
The soundtrack to The Way Back was released on January 18, 2011.

No.	Title	Artist	Length
1.	"Interrogation"	Burkhard Dallwitz	3:36
2.	"New Arrivals"	Burkhard Dallwitz	1:16
3.	"Plans for Escape"	Burkhard Dallwitz	1:58
4.	"A Brave Man"	Burkhard Dallwitz	1:00
5.	"Escape"	Burkhard Dallwitz	2:48
6.	"Lake Baikal"	Burkhard Dallwitz	3:35
7.	"Freedom?"	Burkhard Dallwitz	3:02
8.	"Mirages Don't Have Birds"	Burkhard Dallwitz	2:34
9.	"The Abandoned Temple"	Burkhard Dallwitz	1:17
10.	"Water!"	Burkhard Dallwitz	3:36
11.	"Tibet"	Burkhard Dallwitz	5:26
12.	"India"	Burkhard Dallwitz	1:58
13.	"Keep on Walking"	Burkhard Dallwitz	2:42
14.	"Closing Credits"	Burkhard Dallwitz	7:39
Total length:			42:27

== See also ==
- The Desperate Ones, 1967 film about a gulag escape by two Polish brothers
- As Far as My Feet Will Carry Me, 2001 film about a German World War II prisoner of war escaping from a Siberian Gulag to the Iranian border
- Gulag, 1985 film depicting a gulag escape and arduous journey to freedom
