= Anna (German TV series) =

- Genre: Teen drama
- Created by: Justus Pfaue
- Based on: Anne by Justus Pfaue
- Written by: Justus Pfaue
- Directed by: Frank Strecker
- Starring: Silvia Seidel; Patrick Bach
- Country of origin: West Germany
- No. of seasons: 1
- No. of episodes: 6

Production
- Running time: 55 minutes

Original release
- Network: SF DRS (Switzerland); ZDF (Germany)
- Release: December 25 – December 30, 1987

Anna is a German Christmas television series from 1987, very popular in West Germany then and in the surrounding countries.

== See also ==
- List of German television series
