= Sławomir Rawicz =

Polish Army lieutenant (1915–2004)

Sławomir Rawicz (Polish pronunciation: [swaˈvɔmir ˈravit͡ʂ]; 1 September 1915 – 5 April 2004) was a Polish Army lieutenant who was imprisoned by the NKVD after the Soviet invasion of Poland. In a ghost-written book called The Long Walk, he claimed that in 1941 he and six others had escaped from a Siberian Gulag camp and begun a long journey south on foot (about 6,500 km or 4,000 mi), supposedly travelling through the Gobi Desert, Tibet, and the Himalayas before finally reaching India in the winter of 1942.

In 1955, one year before the publishing of The Long Walk, German Author Josef Martin Bauer released So weit die Füße tragen, a German language book about fictionalized Soldier Clemens Forell (later identified to be former Wehrmacht Soldier Cornelius Rost) which claims a similar narrative about a Siberian escape and subsequent journey to Iran. Rost's account was proven factually untrue in 2010 by journalist Arthur Dittlmann.

In 2006, the BBC released a report based on former Soviet records, including statements written by Rawicz himself, showing that Rawicz had been released as part of the 1942 general amnesty of Poles in the USSR and subsequently transported across the Caspian Sea to a refugee camp in Iran, leading the report to conclude that his supposed escape to India never occurred.

In May 2009, Witold Gliński, a Polish World War II veteran living in the UK, came forward to claim that the story of Rawicz was true, but was actually an account of what happened to him, not Rawicz. Gliński's claims have been severely questioned by various sources. The son of Rupert Mayne, a British intelligence officer in wartime India, stated that in 1942, in Calcutta, his father had interviewed three emaciated men who claimed to have escaped from Siberia. According to his son, Mayne always believed that their story was the same as that of The Long Walk—but telling the story decades later, his son could not remember their names or any details. Subsequent research failed to unearth confirmatory evidence for the story.

== Early life and army career ==
Sławomir Rawicz was born on 1 September 1915 in Pinsk, the son of a landowner. He received private primary education and went on to study architecture in 1932. In 1937 he joined the Polish Army Reserve and underwent the cadet officer school. In July 1939 he married Vera, his first wife. She went missing during World War II.

According to his account, when Nazi Germany and the Soviet Union defeated Poland, Rawicz returned home, where the NKVD arrested him on 19 November 1939. He was taken to Minsk, then sent to Kharkiv for interrogation, then to the Lubyanka prison in Moscow, where he was put on rigged trial. He was tortured to make him confess to being a spy which initially was unsuccessful. He was sentenced to 25 years of hard labour in a Siberian prison camp, ostensibly for espionage as were thousands of others. Researchers for the BBC Radio program The Long Walk in 2006 unearthed documents indicating that the charge against Rawicz might have been for killing a Soviet NKVD officer.

== The Long Walk – Escape from the Gulag camp and walk to India ==
According to the account in the book, Rawicz was transported, alongside thousands of others, to Irkutsk and made to walk to the Gulag Camp 303, which was 650 kilometres (400 mi) south of the Arctic Circle. His labour duties in the camp included the construction of the prisoners' barracks, the manufacture of skis for the Soviet army, and the repair and operation of the camp commandant's radio.

In The Long Walk, Rawicz describes how he and six companions escaped from the camp in the middle of a blizzard in 1941 and headed south, avoiding towns. The fugitive party included three Polish soldiers, a Latvian landowner, a Lithuanian architect, and an enigmatic US metro engineer called "Mr. Smith"; they were later joined by a 17-year-old Polish girl, Kristina. They journeyed from Siberia to India crossing the Gobi Desert and Himalayas. Four of the group died, two in the Gobi, two in the Himalayas. The book also mentions the spotting of a pair of yeti-like creatures in the Himalayas.

According to the book, four survivors of the 11-month trek reached British India around March 1942 and stumbled upon a Gurkha patrol. They were taken to a hospital in Calcutta. Towards the end of the book, Mr. Smith asked Rawicz about his future. Rawicz told Smith he would rejoin the Polish army. Once released from the hospital, the survivors went their own ways. Some were still permanently sick from the hardships of the Long Walk.

== WWII activities after imprisonment ==
According to Rawicz, he moved from India to Iraq, then re-entered the Soviet Union in June 1942 and rejoined the Polish Army on 24 July 1942 at Kermini. He then returned to Iraq with Polish troops and moved on to Palestine, where he spent time recovering in a hospital and teaching in a military school. He claimed that General Władysław Anders had recommended his transfer to Britain for training as a pilot of the Polish Air Forces in Great Britain.

== Historical records ==
Soviet records confirm that Rawicz was a Polish soldier imprisoned in the USSR, but differ from The Long Walk in detail on the reasons for his arrest and the exact places of imprisonment. Polish Army records show that Rawicz left the USSR directly for Iran in 1942, which contradicts the book's storyline. Aside from matters concerning his health, his arrival in Palestine is verified by the records. The story of the escape to India comes from Rawicz himself.

According to the Captain's son and long after the supposed event, Captain Rupert Mayne, an intelligence officer in Calcutta, said that in 1942 he had debriefed three emaciated men claiming to have escaped from a Siberian Gulag camp. Mayne did not provide any further details, did not identify Rawicz as one of the men, and despite extensive subsequent research no hard confirmatory evidence has been found.

== Postwar life ==
After the war he settled in Sandiacre, Derbyshire, England, and worked at the Nottingham Design Centre. He married Marjorie Gregory née Needham in 1947; they had five children. In the early 1970s he became a technician at the Architectural Ceramics course at Nottingham Trent University School of Art and Design. A heart attack forced him into early retirement in 1975. He lived a quiet life with his family, giving public talks and answering fan mail, until his death, aged 88, on 5 April 2004.

Three weeks after Harold Nicolson reviewed The Long Walk for The Observer, the newspaper published a short article entitled "Long Walker", in response to readers' questions about Rawicz's postwar life. In addition to the familiar biographical details to 1956, presumably supplied by author or publisher, the article added: "About his real name he preserves secrecy".

== The Long Walk ==
The Long Walk was ghost-written by Ronald Downing based on conversations with Rawicz. It was released in the UK in 1956 and has sold over half a million copies worldwide and has been translated into 25 languages. The Readers Book Club edition (1958), and the "concise" version (edited by S. H. Burton) brought out by Longmans and Green in their Heritage of Literature Series for schools (1960), helped popularise the book. The "concise" edition went out of print in the late 1980s.

The film The Way Back (released in late 2010), directed by Peter Weir, was inspired by the story.

Over the years, numerous critics of the book have challenged its authenticity and accuracy, including Peter Fleming (Ian Fleming's brother), Eric Shipton, and Hugh E. Richardson, a British diplomat stationed in Lhasa.

== Other versions and historical research ==
Various people have researched the veracity of the story. Examples include:

- Witold Gliński, a Polish survivor of the war, claimed that he was the person who did "the long walk". Reader's Digest published his story in 2009.
- Leszek Gliniecki, another Polish war survivor, claims to have multiple documents showing that Gliński could not have been there.
- Linda Willis did a decade of research on most parts of the story, without reaching a definite conclusion, but cleared up some details.

Leszek Gliniecki has copies of official documents which state that Witold Gliński was born in 1926 (22 November), was sent into forced exile to a special settlement Kriesty in Arkhangelsk Oblast (Province), Russia, and stayed there from 24 February 1940 to 2 September 1941. This is confirmed by the international organisation "Memorial", the Polish Institute of National Remembrance and the Arkhangelsk Province archives. The above information would not allow Witold Gliński to have taken part in the Long Walk. Archives of the Polish Army in the West, and his death certificate confirm that Witold Gliński was born in 1926. Citations from: 1. "Memorial": Victims of political terrorism in USSR; 2. Polish Institute of National Remembrance (IPN): INDEKS REPRESJONOWANYCH (Index of Victims of Soviet Repression) tom XIV częśc (part)2; 3. Arhangelsk Department of Internal Affairs, Information Centre; 4. Ministry of Defence, APC POLISH ENQUIRES, Ruislip England, 5. Certified copy of an entry (BAX 935402) that Witold Gliński was born on 22 November 1926, and died on 19 April 2013.

== Bibliography ==
- Rawicz, Sławomir; Downing, Ronald Downing (1955). The Long Walk. ISBN 1-55821-684-7.

== See also ==
- Ferdynand Antoni Ossendowski, an author of an account of escape from Siberia during the Russian Civil War in the 1920s.

Books

- Looking for Mr. Smith (2010), book by Linda Willis, documenting her research into the story behind The Long Walk and her findings.
- Random Acts of Heroic Love (2007), a semi-biographical novel by Danny Scheinmann, about a man who escaped a POW camp in Siberia in 1917 and spent three years walking home to his village in Poland. Based on a true story of the author's grandfather.
- Seven Years in Tibet, an autobiographic travel book by Austrian mountaineer Heinrich Harrer, who escaped from British India into Tibet during the Second World War.

Films

- The Desperate Ones (1967), about two Polish brothers escaping the gulag in Siberia. They undertake an attempt to make it to the border with Afghanistan.
- As Far as My Feet Will Carry Me (2001), a film based on a book by Josef Martin Bauer, concerning the alleged escape of German World War II prisoner of war Cornelius Rost (under the alias Clemens Forell) from a Siberian Gulag camp back to Germany. There are a number of significant authenticity issues concerning this escape story.
- The Way Back (2010), an epic drama film inspired by The Long Walk
