= Ravioli (TV series) =

German children's television series

- Country of origin: West Germany
- No. of seasons: 1
- No. of episodes: 13

Original release
- Network: ZDF

Ravioli is a West German children's television series. It aired in 1984 on ZDF, co-produced with UFA and Imagion AG. Thirteen 25 minute episodes were produced, directed by Franz Josef Gottlieb. The music for the series was composed by Birger Heymann.

== Plot ==
One day, Jarl-Kulle Düwel wins a holiday for two on the Baltic Sea in a competition. After some thought Jarl-Kulle decides to give this prize to his parents so that they can take a break from the stress of everyday life. The hotel package includes a health spa with all the extras. Perfect for Beate and Walter Düwel, who is the music director of the Berlin Opera, to escape the hustle and bustle for once. Charged with looking after her younger siblings is Heide, who is almost eighteen years old. In addition Grandma Düwel occasionally keeps an eye on the children. In order to ensure the children are catered for, the parents leave behind sufficient housekeeping money for three weeks. However, the children come up with another plan; they decide to use this large amount of money to buy all the wonderful things that they have always wanted. And to keep meal costs down, they plan just to eat ravioli.

So for example, Jarl-Kulle, who sees himself as a budding bestselling writer, buys himself a typewriter, whilst Branca gets herself a complete roller hockey kit and starts to train hard. For a couple of days the ravioli experiment goes well, but gradually the boring menu gets on the children's nerves. Because they have spent almost all their money, they have to come up with something else. So they organise, for example, a "pot luck party". Cute, little Pepe, the baby of the family, shows great imagination and quickly becomes friends with the owner of the sausage stall in the street. Meanwhile, Jarl-Kulle chats up one girl after another in the hope that she will cook for him and his siblings. Before long he gets the nickname "Ravioli Casanova".

Life without their parents proves to be increasingly difficult as time goes by. Chaos breaks out time and again and accidents, like the flooding dishwasher or exploding kettle, eventually lead to a partial redecoration of the flat. But, fortunately, for such cases, Max-Leo, the devoted boyfriend of elder sister, Heide, is always on hand. Mrs Nettelbeck, the Düwel's neighbour proves to be just as helpful.

The parents spend their holiday a little differently than planned. Walter Düwel does not bother with going to the beach or even playing any sport. He is at loggerheads with Dr. Klotz, the female doctor, and Lorchen, the room maid, who rail against his constant escapades and especially his heavy smoking. Whilst his wife is busy playing sport, Düwel works on his new symphony. As it soon turns out, not without success.

Some running gags in the series are the coat rack that constantly collapses, Pepe's barricading himself in the bathroom, and the fact that Heide keeps getting Ravioli on her (normally freshly washed) hair.

== Cast ==
- Peter Fricke: Walter Düwel
- Karin Eickelbaum: Beate Düwel
- Bettina Grühn: Branca
- Daniela Ziemann: Heide
- Holger Handtke: Jarl-Kulle
- Gerrit Schmidt-Foß: Pepe
- Torsten Sense: Max-Leo
- Tilly Lauenstein: Oma Düwel
- Barbara Schöne: Frau Nettelbeck
- Ernst H. Hilbich: Müllmann
- Pierre Franckh: Budenbesitzer Felix Sebenstreit
- Rainer Hunold: Polizist
- Julia Biedermann: Marion
- Elke Aberle: Lorchen
- Anita Kupsch: Frau Dr. Klotz
- Edith Hancke: Gemüsehändlerin

== Episodes ==
- 1. Der Gewinn
- 2. Ein Zauberwort
- 3. Hochwasser
- 4. Süßsauer
- 5. Party im Eimer
- 6. Trinkgeld für Pepe
- 7. Auf und davon
- 8. Heimweh
- 9. Die zweite Oma
- 10. Solo für Pepe
- 11. Hühnchen für alle
- 12. Total verrückt
- 13. Die neue Welt

== See also ==
- List of German television series
