= Justus Pfaue =

German author and screenwriter

Justus Pfaue (25 September 1942 – 8 March 2014) was a German author and screenwriter.

== Biography ==
Pfaue was born in Ballenstedt as Norbert Sellmann. He studied law and forensic psychology. In 1965, he published his first novel, and later specialized in books on youth. He lived in Munich and Positano.

== Works ==
=== Novels ===
- 1985: Bas-Boris Bode
- 1986: Devil's grandmother, or the heaven on earth
- 1987: Anna
- 1988: Anna Ballerina
- 1989: Bravo, Anna
- 1989: Laura and Luis

=== Screenplays ===
- 1979: Timm Thaler (TV series, based on the eponymous novel)
- 1980: Merlin (TV series about Merlin)
- 1981: Sternensommer (TV series)
- 1981: Manni, der Libero (TV series)
- 1981: Silas (TV series, based on a novel by Cecil Bødker)
- 1982: Jack Holborn (TV series, based on a novel by Leon Garfield)
- 1983: Mandara (TV series)
- 1983: Nesthäkchen (TV series, besed on the novels by Else Ury)
- 1984: Two Black Sheep (TV series)
- 1984: Patrik Pacard (TV series)
- 1985: Bas-Boris Bode (TV series)
- 1985: Oliver Maass (TV series)
- 1986: Teufels Großmutter (TV series)
- 1986-1991: Die Wicherts von nebenan (TV series)
- 1987: Anna (TV series)
- 1988: Anna (film directed by Frank Strecker, a follow-up to the TV series)
- 1989: Laura und Luis (TV series)
- 1993: Clara (TV miniseries)
- 1994: Blankenese (TV series)
- 2004: Queen of Cherries (TV miniseries)
- 2009: Hand in Hand (TV series)

== Awards and honors ==
- 2005 Golden Romy for Best Screenplay for The Cherry Queen
