= Abenteuerlicher Simplizissimus =

1975 television serial

- Genre: Historical drama; Picaresque
- Based on: Simplicius Simplicissimus by Hans Jakob Christoffel von Grimmelshausen
- Screenplay by: Leopold Ahlsen
- Directed by: Fritz Umgelter
- Starring: Matthias Habich
- Composer: Rolf Unkel
- Country of origin: West Germany; Austria
- Original language: German
- No. of episodes: 4

Production
- Producer: Florian Kalbeck; Wolfgang Patzschke
- Cinematography: Kurt Junek
- Editor: Dorothee Maass
- Running time: 384 minutes
- Production company: ZDF; ORF

Original release
- Network: ZDF
- Release: 19 November – 30 November 1975

Abenteuerlicher Simplizissimus (lit. 'Adventurous Simplicissimus') is a 1975 West German-Austrian drama television serial written by Leopold Ahlsen and directed by Fritz Umgelter. It follows the tumultuous adventures of a dimwitted man during the Thirty Years' War. It stars Matthias Habich in the title role along with Christian Quadflieg, Günter Stack, Herbert Stass, Friedrich von Thun and Herbert Fux.

The serial is based on Simplicius Simplicissimus, a 17th-century picaresque novel by Hans Jakob Christoffel von Grimmelshausen. It was co-produced by ZDF and ORF.

== Episodes ==
The original version has four episodes and a total running time of 384 minutes.

1. Das Hanauer Kalb
2. Der Jäger von Soest
3. Der Schatz
4. Adieu Welt

In France, Antenne 2 produced a version edited into 6 episodes of 55 minutes each.

== Release ==
The serial debuted on ZDF on 19 November 1975. Antenne 2's French version aired in 1976. The serial was released on DVD in Germany in May 2008.

It was Umgelter's third historical television series in the 1970s, after Die merkwürdige Lebensgeschichte des Friedrich Freiherrn von der Trenck (1973) and Die unfreiwilligen Reisen des Moritz August Benjowski (1975). The three programmes have been called a trilogy.
