= Fritz Umgelter =

German film director

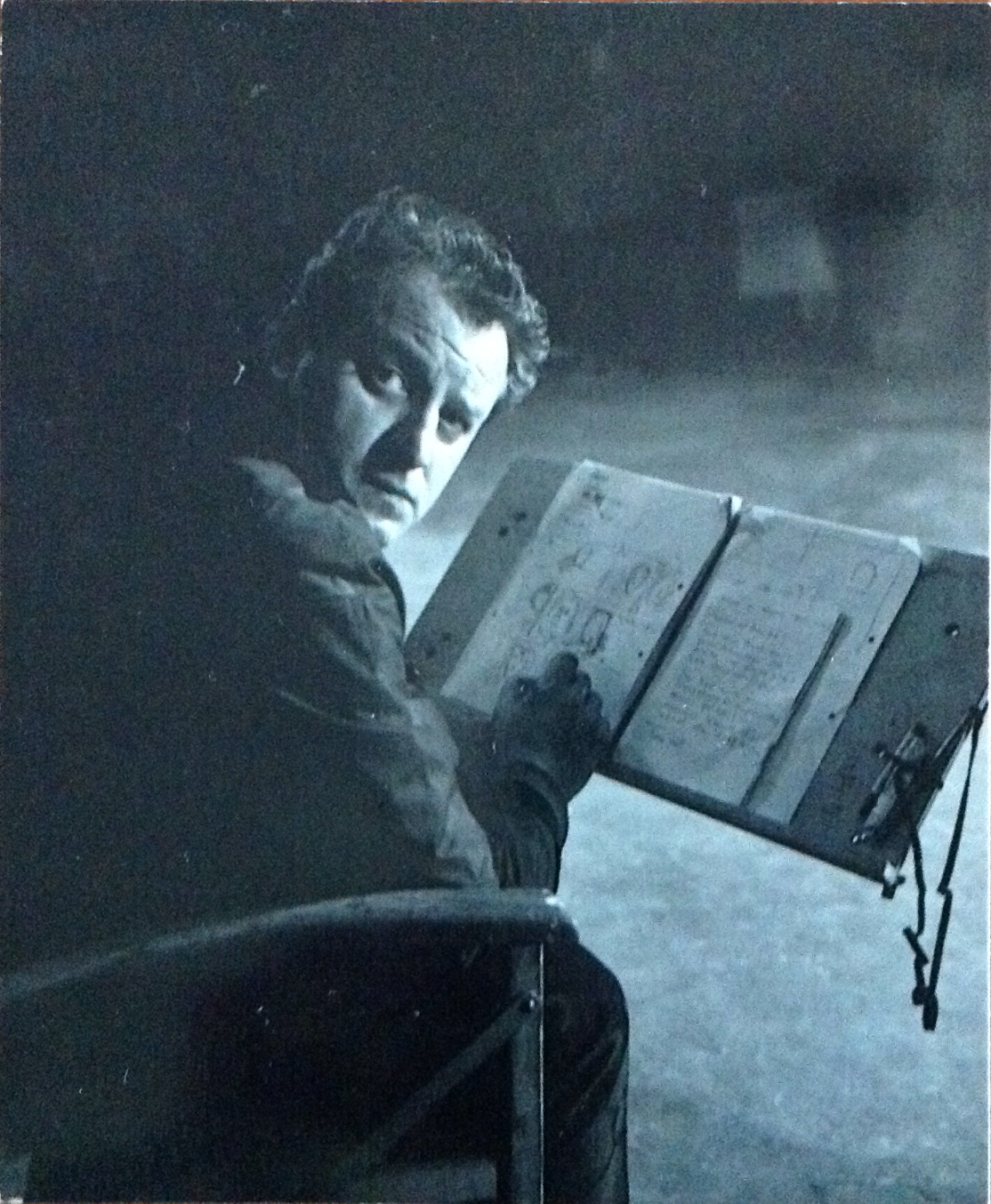
- Umgelter in the early 1960s
- Born: 18 August 1922; Stuttgart, Germany
- Died: 9 May 1981 (aged 58); Frankfurt am Main, West Germany
- Occupations: television director, television writer, film director
- Known for: Der Winter, der ein Sommer war

Fritz Umgelter (18 August 1922 – 9 May 1981) was a German television director, television writer, and film director.

Umgelter worked mainly in television as both a writer and director. He received directing credit for 68 TV films or series, and received writing credits for 22 TV films or series segments. He also directed 7 cinema films (of which he received directing credit for 6), but these were not critically acclaimed, and he remains best known for his television works.

== Awards ==
In 1967 his television film, Bratkartoffeln inbegriffen (based on the play Chips with Everything by Arnold Wesker), he won the Teleplay Award at the Baden-Baden TV Film Festival. This award is presented by the Deutsche Akademie der Darstellenden Künste and is a German analog to a BAFTA or Emmy Award.

== Filmography ==
His film releases were:

- 1958: All the Sins of the Earth
- 1958: Sin Began with Eve (American re-edited version 1962: The Bellboy and the Playgirls)
- 1958: Wenn die Conny mit dem Peter
- 1961: Only the Wind
- 1965: Tread Softly
- 1967: A Handful of Heroes
- 1968: Tower of Screaming Virgins (Uncredited. Director: Franz Antel)

His television work includes:

- Nicht zuhören, meine Damen! (1954) — (based on N'écoutez pas, mesdames !)
- Ein Phönix zuviel (1955) — (based on A Phoenix Too Frequent)
- Der Hund von Baskerville (1955) — (based on The Hound of the Baskervilles)
- Ein Volksfeind (1955) — (based on An Enemy of the People)
- Molière spielt in Versailles (1955) — (based on a play by Walter Knaus including three plays by Molière)
- Schiffchen zu 100 Francs (1956) — (based on the radio play Der Admiral by Alix du Frênes)
- Der Flüchtling (1956) — (based on a play by Fritz Hochwälder)
- Gelähmte Schwingen (1956) — (based on a play by Ludwig Thoma)
- Der Verräter (1956) — (based on the play The Traitor by Herman Wouk)
- Öl und Champagner (1956) — (based on a play by Ferenc Molnár)
- Die letzte Patrouille? (1956) — (screenplay by Artur Müller)
- Das Spinnennetz (1956) — (based on Spider's Web by Agatha Christie)
- Zwölftausend (1956) — (based on a play by Bruno Frank)
- Zehn Jahre und drei Tage (1956) — (based on a radio play by Ivo Braak)
- Die Panne (1957) — (based on A Dangerous Game by Friedrich Dürrenmatt)
- Montserrat (1957) — (based on a play by Emmanuel Roblès)
- Monsignores große Stunde (1957) — (based on the play Monsignor's Hour by Emmet Lavery)
- Romeo und Julia (1957) — (based on Romeo and Juliet)
- Ganz groß in Kleinigkeiten (1957) — (based on An Eye for Detail by Berkely Mather)
- Don Carlos (1957) — (based on Don Carlos)
- Olivia (1958) — (based on Love In Idleness)
- As Far as My Feet Will Carry Me (1959, TV miniseries) — (based on the story of Cornelius Rost)
- Die Räuber (1959) — (based on The Robbers)
- Das mittlere Fenster (1959) — (based on the novel The Middle Window by Elizabeth Goudge)
- Am grünen Strand der Spree (1960, TV miniseries)
- Der Mann, der Donnerstag war (1960) — (based on The Man Who Was Thursday)
- Gericht über Las Casas (1960) — (based on the play Las Casas vor Karl V. by Reinhold Schneider)
- Prinz Friedrich von Homburg (1961) — (based on The Prince of Homburg)
- Die Journalisten (1961) — (based on a play by Gustav Freytag)
- Und Pippa tanzt (1961) — (based on a play by Gerhart Hauptmann)
- Wer einmal aus dem Blechnapf frisst (1962, TV miniseries) — (based on a novel by Hans Fallada)
- Montserrat (1962) — (based on a play by Emmanuel Roblès)
- Der Belagerungszustand (1963) — (based on The State of Siege)
- Danton's Death (1963) — (based on Danton's Death)
- Die Abrechnung (1963) — (based on the play Zar Alexander by Reinhold Schneider)
- Freundschaftsspiel (1963) — (screenplay by Dieter Meichsner)
- Der schlechte Soldat Smith (1963) — (based on the play The Bad Soldier Smith by William Douglas Home)
- Den Tod in der Hand (1963) — (based on the novel Échec au porteur by Noël Calef)
- Der Traum des Eroberers (1964) — (based on a play by Reinhold Schneider)
- König Richard III (1964) — (based on Richard III)
- Tom und seine Söhne (1964) — (based on The Country Boy)
- Bei Tag und Nacht (1964) — (based on The Dog in the Manger)
- The Physicists (1964) — (based on The Physicists)
- Überstunden (1965) — (screenplay by Johannes Hendrich)
- Der Sündenbock (1965) — (based on a novel by Luise Rinser)
- Nun singen sie wieder (1965) — (based on a play by Max Frisch)
- Nachtfahrt (1965) — (based on a novel by Simon Glas)
- Perlenkomödie (1966) — (based on a play by Bruno Frank)
- Münchhausen (1966) — (based on a play by Walter Hasenclever)
- Freiheit im Dezember (1966) — (screenplay by Leo Lehman)
- Caroline (1966) — (based on a play by W. Somerset Maugham)
- Herrenhaus (1966) — (based on the play Mannerhouse by Thomas Wolfe)
- Der gute Mensch von Sezuan (1966) — (based on The Good Person of Szechwan)
- Nur einer wird leben (1966) — (based on a novel by André Picot)
- Die Affäre Eulenburg (1967) — (Docudrama about the Harden–Eulenburg affair)
- Bratkartoffeln inbegriffen (1967) — (based on Chips with Everything)
- Mr. Arcularis (1967) — (based on a story by Conrad Aiken)
- Sieben Wochen auf dem Eis (1967) — (Docudrama about the crash of the airship Italia)
- So war Herr Brummell (1967) — (film about Beau Brummell, based on a play by Ernst Penzoldt)
- Fräulein Julie (1968) — (based on Miss Julie)
- Die Freier (1969) — (based on a play by Joseph Freiherr von Eichendorff)
- Epitaph für einen König (1969) — (based on August Strindberg's play Karl XII)
- Rebellion of the Lost (1969, TV miniseries) — (screenplay by Wolfgang Menge, based on a novel by Henry Jaeger)
- Der Tanz des Sergeanten Musgrave (1969) — (based on Serjeant Musgrave's Dance)
- Like a Tear in the Ocean (1970, TV miniseries) — (based on Like a Tear in the Ocean by Manès Sperber)
- Sessel zwischen den Stühlen (1970) — (screenplay by Wolfgang Menge)
- Menschen (1970) — (based on Creatures That Once Were Men by Maxim Gorky)
- Merkwürdige Geschichten (1970–71, TV series, 13 episodes)
- Viel Getu' um nichts (1971) — (based on Much Ado About Nothing)
- Elsa Brändström (1971) — (Docudrama about Elsa Brändström)
- Es braust ein Ruf wie Donnerhall – Ur-Opas dufter Krieg 70/71 (co-director: Jürgen Neven-du Mont, 1971)
- Das Abenteuer eines armen Christenmenschen (1971) — (based on Story of a Humble Christian)
- Das Klavier (1972) — (based on a novel by Julius Tinzmann)
- Die merkwürdige Lebensgeschichte des Friedrich Freiherrn von der Trenck (1973, TV miniseries) — (biographical film about Friedrich von der Trenck)
- Der Vorgang (1973) — (based on a novel by Ladislav Mňačko)
- Wenn alle anderen fehlen (1973) — (screenplay by Manfred Bieler)
- Der Zweck heiligt die Mittel (1973) — (based on La Fin et les Moyens by Louis C. Thomas)
- Arsène Lupin (1974, TV series, 3 episodes)
- Im Vorhof der Wahrheit (1974) — (screenplay by Johannes Hendrich)
- Die unfreiwilligen Reisen des Moritz August Benjowski (1975, TV miniseries) — (biographical film about Maurice Benyovszky)
- Tatort: Die Rechnung wird nachgereicht (1975)
- Des Christoffel von Grimmelshausen abenteuerlicher Simplizissimus (1975, TV miniseries) — (based on Simplicius Simplicissimus)
- Ein Badeunfall (1976) — (screenplay by Karl Wittlinger)
- Tatort: Zwei Flugkarten nach Rio (1976)
- Die Babenberger in Österreich (1976) — (documentary about the Babenberg dynasty, starring Klaus Maria Brandauer)
- Der Winter, der ein Sommer war (1976, TV miniseries) — (based on a novel by Sandra Paretti)
- Tatort: Flieder für Jaczek (1977)
- Tatort: Feuerzauber (1977)
- Vorhang auf, wir spielen Mord (1978) — (based on the novel Enter Murderers by Henry Slesar)
- Ein typischer Fall (1978) — (screenplay by Irene Rodrian)
- Revolution in Frankfurt (1979) — (film about the Fettmilch uprising 1614)
- Dr. Knock oder Der Triumph der Medizin (1979) — (based on Knock)
- Die rote Zora und ihre Bande (1979, TV miniseries) — (based on The Outsiders of Uskoken Castle)
- The Weavers (1980) — (based on The Weavers)
- Gesucht wird ... – Drei Geschichten um nicht ganz ehrenwerte Herren (1980) — (screenplay by Herbert Reinecker)
- In Prag und anderswo (1980) — (biographical film about Jaroslav Hašek)
- Tatort: Schattenboxen (1981)
- In the Land of Cockaigne (1981) — (based on a novel by Heinrich Mann)
- Das Traumschiff (1981–82, TV series, 6 episodes)
