= The Wishing Tree =

The Wishing Tree, or Wish Tree, may refer to:

- Wishing tree, a wish-granting tree, found in folklore

== Books ==
- The Wishing Tree (Faulkner book), a 1927 children's book by William Faulkner
- The Wishing Tree (Paretti novel), a 1975 novel by Sandra Paretti

== Film ==
- The Wishing Tree (1976 film), a Georgian film by Tengiz Abuladze
- The Wishing Tree (1999 film), a Canadian-American fantasy drama film
- The Wishing Tree, a 2012 television film starring Jason Gedrick and Erica Cerra
- The Wishing Tree, a 2017 Indian film starring Rajit Kapur and Saurabh Shukla

== Television episodes ==
- "Henry and the Wishing Tree", an episode of the British children's television series Thomas & Friends
- "The Wishing Tree", an episode of the British animated children's television series Chorlton and the Wheelies

== Other ==
- "Wish Tree" (song), a song by Red Velvet
- The Wishing Tree (band), a UK folk rock band
- "Wish Tree" (Yoko Ono art series), an art installation
- Wishing Tree, an electoral ward in Hastings, East Sussex, England
- Lam Tsuen wishing trees, shrine in Hong Kong

== See also ==
- The Giving Tree, a 1964 American children's picture book.
