= Manni, der Libero =

German television series

- Created by: Justus Pfaue
- Directed by: Franz Josef Gottlieb
- Starring: Thomas Ohrner
- Country of origin: Germany

Manni, der Libero is a 1982 German television series starring Tommi Ohrner.
