= Das Haus der Krokodile =

1976 German television miniseries

- Created by: Helmut Ballot
- Directed by: Wilhelm ten Haaf
- Starring: Tommi Ohrner; Carolin Ohrner; Evelyn Palek
- Country of origin: Germany
- No. of seasons: 1
- No. of episodes: 6

Production
- Running time: 30 minutes

Original release
- Network: ARD
- Release: February 22 – March 28, 1976

Das Haus der Krokodile (roughly translated as House of Crocodiles) is a 1976 German children's television miniseries based on the 1971 mystery novel by Helmut Ballot. Directed by Wilhelm ten Haaf, and starring Tommi Ohrner, the six-part miniseries premiered on the ARD on February 22, 1976.

== Synopsis ==
Playing alone one night while his parents are on vacation, twelve-year-old Victor Laroche (Tommi Ohrner) glimpses a mysterious masked man behind him in the mirror and soon begins to uncover a mystery surrounding the death of a girl named Cecilia who fell over a stair railing in the house 20 years earlier. Although not entirely convinced of his story, Victor's sisters Cora (Carolin Ohrner) and Louise (Evelyn Palek) agree to help him investigate the girl's mysterious death.

With the help of an elderly uncle who was Cecilia's father (Oskar Schwab) and an old friend of Cecilia's (Robert Naegele), the Laroche children piece together the mystery of the death of their cousin, the unknown man in the mirror, and a little leather crocodile they find with strange gleaming eyes.

== Cast ==
- Tommi Ohrner: Victor Laroche
- Carolin Ohrner: Cora Laroche
- Evelyn Palek: Louise Laroche
- Robert Naegele: Friedrich Mörlin
- Oskar von Schwab: Onkel
- Erik Jelde: Herr Opitz
- Nora Minor: Frau Debisch
- Matthias Eysen: Herr von Strichninsky

== Episodes ==
- 1. Der Mann im Spiegel (The Man in the Mirror)
- 2. Der nächtliche Besucher (The Nocturnal Visitor)
- 3. Die Geburtstagsfeier (The Birthday Celebration)
- 4. Eine neue Entdeckung (A New Discovery)
- 5. Gewitter in der Nacht (Storm in the Night)
- 6. Ein unerwartetes Geständnis (An Unexpected Confession)

== Feature film ==
In October 2011 it was announced that a feature film adaptation of the story was being filmed. The film Victor and the Secret of Crocodile Mansion was released on March 21, 2012 and starred Kristo Ferkic as Victor and his real-life siblings Joanna and Vijessna Ferkic as Cora and Louise. Tommi Ohrner, who played Victor in the original series, also appeared in the film, this time in a cameo role as Victor's father.
