= Rainer Hunold =

German television actor (born 1949)

Rainer Hunold (born 1 November 1949 in Brunswick, West Germany) is a German television actor.

== Filmography ==
Year	Title	Role	Notes
1978	Ein Mann will nach oben	Kalli Flau	TV Series, 11 episodes
1978	Just a Gigolo	Lothar	
1979	Iron Gustav	Wilhelm Hackendahl	TV Mini-Series, 3 episodes
1979	Derrick: Ein Kongreß in Berlin	Bus driver	TV Series episode
1979	The Great Runaway	Hamburger	TV Mini-Series, 3 episodes
1980	Fabian	Weckerlein	
1980	The Dream House	Wittig	
1981	Derrick: Am Abgrund	Willi Raspe	TV Series episode
1981	Sternensommer	Martin Feucht	TV Series, 6 episodes
1982	Be Gentle, Penguin	Tommy	
1982	Frau Jenny Treibel	Otto Treibel	TV Movie
1983	Marianne und Sophie	Willi	
1983	Mandara	Pastor Schalk	TV Mini-Series, 5 episodes
1984	Beautiful Wilhelmine	Frederick William II	TV Mini-Series, 4 episodes
1986	Engels & Consorten	Frithjof Engels	TV Series, 5 episodes
1986	Denkste!? – Wohin mit Willfried?	Paul	TV Series episode
1986	Monte Carlo	Gunther	TV Movie
1987	The Little Prosecutor	Rademacher	
1988–1997	Ein Fall für zwei	Dr. Rainer Franck	TV Series, 90 episodes
1991	Ex & Hopp	Hermann Schnitter	TV Movie
1991	Kollege Otto – Die Coop-Affäre	Co-Op manager Bernd Otto	TV Movie
1993	Böses Blut	Martin Bodmer	TV Movie
1997–2004	Dr. Sommerfeld – Neues vom Bülowbogen	Dr. Peter Sommerfeld	TV Series, 115 episodes
2005–2023	Der Staatsanwalt	Staatsanwalt Bernd Reuther	TV Series, 113 episodes
2007	Der letzte Bissen	Kommissar	
2008	Instructor Schmidt	Oberst Herold	
