= Friedrich von der Trenck =

Prussian army officer, adventurer, and author (1726-1794)

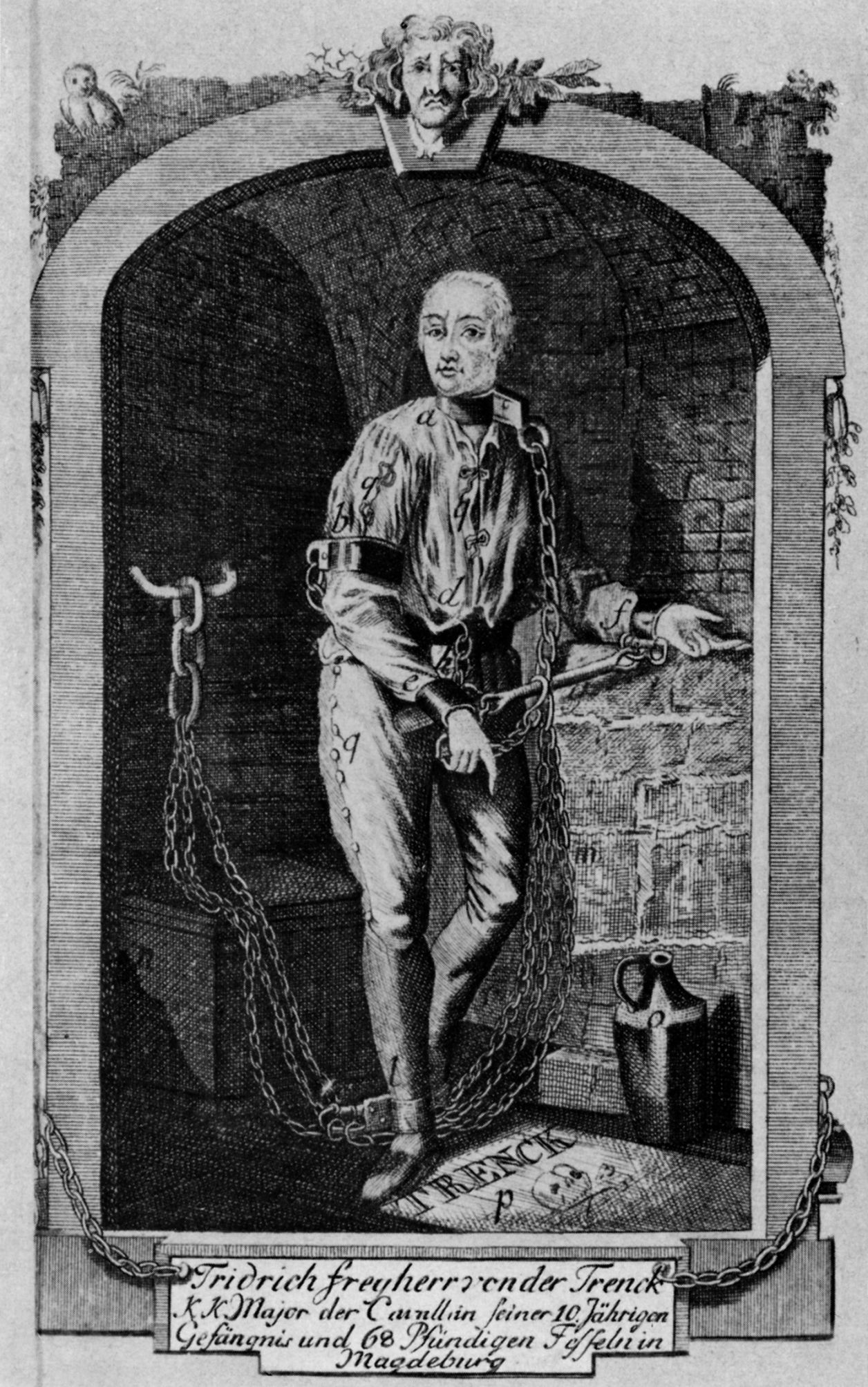
Friedrich von der Trenck

Friedrich Freiherr von der Trenck (16 February 1726 – 25 July 1794) was a Prussian officer, adventurer, and author.

== Coat of arms ==
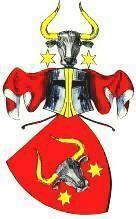
Coat of arms of the noble family von der Trenck, known as Stier

The coat of arms of the Trenck family depicts in red the head of a silver bull with golden tongue and golden horns. Below there are two golden stars. The German word for "bull" is Stier which explains why the family was also known as Stier.

== Life ==
Von der Trenck was born in Haldensleben, which is north of the city of Magdeburg, today in Saxony-Anhalt, then the Prussian-ruled Duchy of Magdeburg, on 16 February 1727. His parents were Major-General Baron Christopher Ehrenreich von der Trenck (1677–1740) and Marie Charlotte von Derschau. His father was transferred to Königsberg in 1729. Friedrich's grandfather was Albrecht Frederick von Derschau, who was President of the Royal Law Court in Königsberg.

Documents show that Friedrich was a law student in 1741 at the University of Königsberg. In November 1742 he became a cadet in Frederick the Great's garde de corps and six weeks later was given the commission of Cornet. von Trenck was involved in a minor scandal in 1744 when he was caught in a tryst with Frederick's sister Anna Amalia during the engagement feast of Louisa Ulrika, another of Frederick's sisters. Frederick had von Trenck arrested. Anna Amalia never married and would end her days as the Abbess of Quedlinburg.

In August 1744 during the Silesian Wars Friedrich was sent to Silesia and became an orderly officer of Frederick the Great. Unfortunately for Friedrich, his first cousin Baron Franz von der Trenck, who was on the side of Austria and who nearly captured Frederick the Great, returned his cousin's horses that had been taken by an Austrian officer. When it was also learned that he was Franz von Trenck's sole heir, rumors spread that Friedrich was an Austrian spy. Friedrich was imprisoned one year later, in 1745, at Glatz under the guard of Heinrich August de la Motte Fouqué. The king ordered that Friedrich had to sit on his own gravestone.

In 1746, von der Trenck escaped from the fortress of Glatz (Kłodzko). Then, in 1749, he obtained an employment as Rittmeister of an imperial cuirassier regiment in Hungary. He traveled to Russia where he became, or so he claimed, gentleman of the bedchamber in the court of Tsarina Elizabeth of Russia. He fell in love with a married woman, whose name he never revealed.

In 1753, he went to Danzig for the funeral of his mother, but was again captured on the orders of Frederick II and was sent to the Citadel Magdeburg in Magdeburg. To prevent him from attempting to escape, they fastened his hands, feet, and body with heavy chains and manacles. In 1763, he was released through the intervention of Empress Maria Theresa.

During the next ten years, von der Trenck led an active life. He busied himself in writing literature, running a wine trading business, and travelling to England and France. His autobiography Friedrichs Freyherrn von der Trenck merkwürdige Lebensgeschichte (1787, first English translation 1788 with the title Memoirs of Frederick Baron Trenck, Written by himself. Translated from the German original, by an officer of the Royal Artillery) became popular reading in the late 18th century.

In December 1765, he married Maria Elisabeth de Broe zu Dipenbendt, who bore him fourteen children.

In August 1787, the Prussian King Frederick Wilhelm II granted Friedrich and his wife a yearly pension. The Austrians also granted him a pension.

By the order of Austria, von der Trenck was sent to observe the events of the French Revolution in Paris, where he was accused as a spy and executed by the guillotine on 25 July 1794, two days before the fall of Robespierre and the end of The Terror.

The son of Friedrich von der Trenck, the Austrian Lieutenant Field Marschall Karl Albrecht's von der Trenck, inherited the title of Count, a title which the King of Prussia had awarded his father after his father's death. When Karl died the title was inherited by his brother's son Leopold von der Trenck.

== Literature and film ==
Hohenzollern. Tragic Private Lives. By Douglas Norman Parker. Universal Publishers, Boca Raton, Florida, USA. ISBN 1581124864. 230 pages. This work will be freely available for download from Internet Archive https://archive.org/ and Trove https://trove.nla.gov.au/. Extensive original research on Princess Anna Amalie of Prussian & Baron Frederick von der Trenck. Including extensive bibliography, magnificent photographs, maps & genealogy.

Trenck and his life feature in many novels and he has been the subject of several films.

- He is a character in George Sand's 1842 novel Consuelo.
- He is mentioned by M^{me} de Villefort in chapter 52 of the 1844 novel The Count of Monte Cristo by Alexandre Dumas.
- He is mentioned in Robert Louis Stevenson's 1878 short story "The Suicide Club".
- In Saul Bellow's novel Humboldt's Gift the character Charlie Citrine has written a successful Broadway play and a movie about a character named Von Trenck.
- His life was the basis of the 1867 novel The Two Trenks – Friedrich Trenk by Mór Jókai.
- His life was the basis of the 1926 novel Trenck by Bruno Frank.
- The 1932 film Trenck was based on his life.
- In 1972 Fritz Umgelter directed a five-part TV series Die merkwürdige Lebensgeschichte des Friedrich Freiherrn von der Trenck, a German–Austrian–French–Italian co-production which was shown the following year on the public channel ZDF. The series showed von der Trenck in a romantic light, highlighting his nobility of character and honourable behaviour on various occasions. The role of von der Trenck was played by Matthias Habich.
- Trenck, a 2-part miniseries directed by Gernot Roll, which premiered on 9 February 2003 in Germany, tells the romance between Trenck and Princess Anna Amalia.
