= Halfway Across the Galaxy and Turn Left =

1985 novel by Robin Klein

- First edition
- Author: Robin Klein
- Cover artist: Melissa Webb
- Language: English
- Genre: Science fiction novel
- Publisher: Viking Kestrel
- Publication date: 1985
- Publication place: Australia
- Media type: Print (Hardback & Paperback)
- Pages: 144 pp (first edition, hardback)
- ISBN: 0-670-80636-6 (first edition, hardback)
- Followed by: Turn Right For Zyrgon

Halfway Across the Galaxy and Turn Left is a 1985 novel by Australian children's author Robin Klein which also became a children's television series.

The story focuses on an alien family who seek refuge on Earth, in the small town of Bellwood. Klein also wrote a sequel novel called Turn Right for Zyrgon.

== Plot summary ==
The novel tells the tale of the planet Zyrgon, ruled by the galactic police called The Law-Enforcers. They are after Mortimer, who has cheated the government lottery for the 27th time in a row. His family is governed by the youngest daughter, 12-year-old X, who wants to save her father from the detention centre.

The family also includes Mother, who would rather design clothing and leave all worries to her daughter X. The oldest sister Dovis is a cosmic flier who writes poetry and levitates. The youngest is a boy genius, Qwrk who is a professor at age 8.

X is the lead character: a stressed girl who has to balance between strange Earth customs such as school and her duty to take care of her family.

Zyrgonians have special powers such as levitation, simulations, and kinetics. They love gambling and live on an ultra-modern and dystopian planetoid.

== Major themes ==
The novel's theme is children who are forced to grow up too soon and to take responsibilities that are too much for their age. In the novel, X cannot handle the stress and gets very ill, but she is cured in the end when she finally finds her place on the new planet.

== Television series ==
Halfway Across the Galaxy and Turn Left
- Genre: Sci-fi/Aliens
- Created by: Robin Klein
- Starring: Lauren Hewett; Jeffrey Walker; Jan Friedl; Bruce Myles; Silvia Seidel; Sandy Gore; Bruce Spence
- Country of origin: Australia
- No. of episodes: 28

Production
- Running time: 24 minutes

Original release
- Network: Seven Network
- Release: 19 June 1994 – 1 January 1995

The story was made into a television series. Although made in 1992, it was not broadcast until 1994–1995. It was very popular in Australia and aired on Children's Independent Television (CITV) and The Children's Channel (TCC) in the UK, as well as in other parts of Europe. The series is not available on DVD, though in the early 1990s several episodes were released on VHS in the United Kingdom.

The TV show had 28 episodes, split into 2 story arcs. The first story arc stayed close to the novel, the second arc had new stories written, some of which would end up incorporated into the sequel novel, Turn Right for Zyrgon.

The entire series was filmed in Melbourne, Australia. Zyrgon, and the family home interior were shot on the Crawford Productions sound-stage. The town of Bellwood was shot in Williamstown. The family home exterior is located in Surrey Hills. The props for the space raft and other sets were kept in the Crawford Productions lot for a couple of years following production, however, they were eventually dismantled and destroyed.

The series was repeated in the UK between 2007 and 2008 on CITV, a digital children's channel. A 70-minute compilation movie of the first three episodes has been aired on WIN Television as part of their Christmas Day programming.

The series has been released in Germany as Quer Durch die Galaxie und dann Links on DVD, however according to Amazon the only language option provided is German.

== Cast ==
- Lauren Hewett as X
- Kellie Smythe as Jenny
- Che Broadbent as Colin
- Jeffrey Walker as Qwrk
- Bruce Myles as Father
- Jan Friedl as Mother
- Silvia Seidel as Dovis
  - Amanda Douge as Dovis (English Voice)
- Bruce Spence as The Chief
- Kerry Armstrong as Officer Jady
- Paul Kelman as Lox
- Diane Cilento as Principa/Authoritax
- Sandy Gore as Aunt Hecla
- David Argue as Yorp
- Spencer McLaren as Law Enforcer
- Alex Menglet as Mr Hohenhaus
- Marion Edward as Miss Brewster
