= Richard Lauffen =

German actor

Richard Lauffen (June 2, 1907 – August 28, 1990) was a German actor.

== Filmography ==
Year	Title	Role	Notes
1948	Menschen in Gottes Hand	Lehrer Lührs	
1956	Damals in Paris	Padet	
1957	Rivalen am Steuer	Roseiro	
1959	The Tiger of Eschnapur	Bhowana	
1959	The Indian Tomb	Bhowana	
1960	The Crimson Circle	Marles	
1970	Hurra, unsere Eltern sind nicht da	Herr Müller	
1978	The Rider on the White Horse	Jewe Manners	
1979	Timm Thaler	Anatol	TV series
1988	Ödipussi	Vater Tietze	
