= Silas (TV series) =

1981 television series

- Genre: Adventure
- Based on: Silas og den sorte hoppe by Cecil Bødker
- Written by: Justus Pfaue
- Directed by: Sigi Rothemund
- Starring: Patrick Bach; Diether Krebs; Lucki Molocher; Nina Rothemund; Ingeborg Lapsien; Armin Schawe; Shmuel Rodensky; André Lacombe; Jacques van Dooren
- Composer: Christian Bruhn
- Country of origin: West Germany
- Original language: German
- No. of episodes: 6

Production
- Executive producer: Dieter Graber
- Producer: Bernd Burgemeister
- Editor: Heidrun Berktold
- Running time: 45

Original release
- Network: ZDF
- Release: 25 December – 30 December 1981

Silas is a 1981 ZDF adventure television mini-series based on the Danish children's book Silas og den sorte hoppe (Silas and the Black Mare) by Cecil Bødker who kept on writing installments until 2001.

The series was Patrick Bach's debut, and because the series did so well, he also starred the very next year in another adventure series about a young orphan: Jack Holborn.

Silas was a German production, and despite being recorded in France — Normandy and in Brittany (Bay of Douarnenez, Locronan, Bay of Audierne, near Plovan - on the long sandy beach where the German version of the opening credits were shot) — it was filmed solely in German. Still it received attention beyond German-speaking countries and consequently the successor Jack Holborn involved international producers and was dub filmed in English.

== Plot ==
As a little child, Silas (Patrick Bach) was sold to a circus where he learned to pull stunts and tricks from early on. This comes in handy when he decides to rather live an adventurous life on his own than to be trained in the dangerous art of sword swallowing. Also being threatened by director Philipp (Diether Krebs) that the sinews of his feet would be cut just in order to prevent him from running away, it occurs to him it is now or never and off he goes. A farmer called Bartolin (Shmuel Rodensky) gives him shelter but underestimates the boy's skills and carelessly bets him his horse. Bartolin cannot accept the outcome of this bet and so Silas is on the run again. Getting hungry he accepts a meal provided by swindler Emanuel (André Lacombe) and his likewise rogue wife Theresa (Reine Barteve). They use a strong barbiturate on Silas and disappear with his horse. After Silas awakens in a boat on a river he sees Philipp trying to steal fresh milk from a blind girl. When the girl's mother arrives Philipp puts the blame on Silas, who as a result finds himself in a wooden cage. He has to find a way to gain the family's trust if he wants to escape.

While searching for his horse, he meets the scallywag Godik (Lucki Molocher), who helps him to retrieve the animal. They stick together, both trying to make a living on what they've learned. Silas shows circus tricks and Godik works as a carver. Yet Silas gets into trouble again because he and Godik stumble across a treasure hidden by smugglers. Hunted by the smuggler's gang, they run into homeless young Jenny (Nina Rothemund), who is running from an unsavoury woman called Corby (Ingeborg Lapsien). Silas, Godik and Jenny reach a town, where Silas gets the idea of buying a bear with money from the smuggler's treasure. The citizens decide to investigate him over theft. He finds himself in prison with Corby, who once abducted Jenny. Eventually, he learns that Jenny is not really an orphan. Silas and Godik return Jenny to her family. Then Silas accompanies his friend Godik to his family. The lost son Godik is heartily welcomed and so is Silas, but Silas doesn't feel safe and believes his presence is endangering his new friends. On the road again, he makes new friends - he saves merchant Sandal (Hans Helmut Dickow) and later also his son Japetus (Armin Schawe) from harm. But Corby has followed him. She teams up with some other low-lifes, who eventually capture Silas and Japetus for ransom. Sandal's employee Karneol (Jacques van Dooren) saves them. Corby and her gang are imprisoned. Silas finally feels saved and returns to Godik and his family.

== International broadcast ==
The BBC took the series from Cori Film Distributors and split it into twelve 24-minute episodes starting on 16 May 1984, with repeats in 1986, 1987 and 1988 during the summer holidays.

It was also broadcast on Iranian television in 1991.

== Accolades ==
Bambi Award 1982

- Cecil Bødker: Silas (Originaltitel: Silas og den sorte hoppe). Deutsch von Gerda Neumann. Fischer-Taschenbuch-Verlag, Frankfurt am Main 1996, 158 S., ISBN 3-596-80196-6
