= Trenck family =

von der Trenck gen. Stier
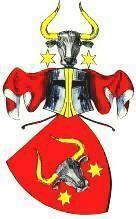
- Trenck gen. Stier coat of arms
- Current region: Prussia, Germany
- Origin: Prussia
- Founded: 1370, 1215
- Founder: Augustin, Lord at Trenck ( *1370)
- Members: Friedrich Wilhelm von der Trenck gen. Stier; Karl Albrecht Graf von der Trenck gen. Stier; Friedrich Freiherr von der Trenck gen. Stier; Franz Freiherr von der Trenck gen. Stier; Christoph Ehrenreich von der Trenck gen. Stier; Friedrich Ludwig von der Trenck gen. Stier; Alfred von der Trenck gen. Stier; Siegfried von der Trenck gen. Stier
- Estates: Schakaulack, East Prussia (the family seat of the Trenck gen. Stier family since 1478), Zwerbach, Lower Austria

The Trenck family is one of Prussia's preeminent aristocratic families of ancient nobility (Uradel). Over time, several family members were made Freiherrn and Grafen. Hereditary titles held by the v.d. Trenck gen. Stier family include Graf von der Trenck gen. Stier (since 5 June 1798) and Freiherr von der Trenck gen. Stier (permission granted by the King of Prussia on 9 May 1825).

Notable family members are Friedrich Freiherr von der Trenck (1726–1794) and Franz Freiherr von der Trenck (1711–1749). Friedrich, the writer of the celebrated autobiography, was born on 16 February 1726 at Konigsberg, his father being a Prussian general. After distinguishing himself for his quickness and imagination at the university of Konigsberg, he entered the Prussian army in 1742, and soon became an orderly officer on King Frederick the Great's own staff. But within a year he fell into disgrace because of a love affair - whether real or imaginary - with the king's sister Princess Amalie. His autobiography, which has been translated into several languages, first appeared in German at Berlin and Vienna (13 vols.) in 1787. Shortly afterwards a French version, by his own hand, was published at Strassburg. His other published works are in eight volumes and appeared shortly after the autobiography at Leipzig. A reprint of the autobiography appeared in 1910 in "Reclam's Universal Series."

Friedrich's cousin Franz was born on 1 January 1711. Educated by the Jesuits at Oedenburg, he entered the Imperial army in 1728 but resigned in disgrace three years later. He then married and lived on his estates for some years. Upon the death of his wife in 1737 he offered to raise an irregular corps of "Pandours" for service against the Turks, but this offer was refused and he then entered the Russian army. But after serving against the Turks for a short time as captain and major of cavalry he was accused of bad conduct, brutality and disobedience and condemned to death, the sentence being commuted by Field Marschal Miinnich to degradation and imprisonment. After a time he returned to Austria, where his father was governor of a small fortress, but there too he came into conflict with every one and, actually "took sanctuary" in a convent in Vienna. But Prince Charles of Lorraine, interesting himself in this strange man, obtained for him an amnesty and a commission in a corps of irregulars. In this command, besides his usual truculence and robber manners, he displayed conspicuous personal bravery, and in spite of the general dislike into which his vices brought him his services were so valuable that he was promoted lieutenant-colonel (1743) and colonel (1744). But at the battle of Soor he and his irregulars plundered when they should have been fighting and Trenck was accused (probably falsely) of having allowed the king of Prussia himself to escape. After a time he was brought before a court-martial in Vienna, which convicted him of having sold and withdrawn commissions to his officers without the queen's leave, punished his men without heed to the military code, and drawn pay and allowance for fictitious men. Much was allowed to an irregular officer in all these respects, but Trenck had far outrun the admitted limits, and above all his brutalities and robberies had made him detested throughout Austria and Silesia. A death sentence followed, but the composition of the court-martial and its proceedings were thought to have been such as from the first forbade a fair trial, and the sentence was commuted by the queen into one of cashiering and imprisonment. The rest of his life was spent in mild captivity in the fortress of Spielberg, where he died on 4 October 1749.

== Coat of arms of the noble family von der Trenck gen. Stier ==
The coat of arms of the Trenck gen. Stier family depicts in red the head of a silver bull with golden tongue and golden horns and two golden stars. The German word for 'bull' is 'Stier' which is the reason why the family has also been known as 'Stier'.

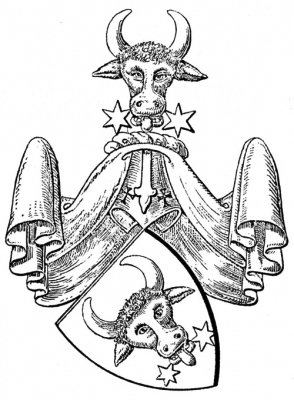
