= Klemperer – Ein Leben in Deutschland =

- Starring: Matthias Habich
- Country of origin: Germany

Klemperer – Ein Leben in Deutschland is a German television series based on the diary of Victor Klemperer.

== See also ==
- List of German television series
