= Cornelius Rost =

Austrian-German soldier (1919–1983)

- Rost at a London press conference in 1958
- Born: 27 March 1919; Kufstein, Tyrol, Austria
- Died: 18 October 1983 (aged 64); Munich, Bavaria, West Germany
- Occupation: Printer

Cornelius Rost (27 March 1919, Kufstein, Austria – 18 October 1983, Munich, Germany) was an Austrian drafted into the German army as a soldier in World War II who allegedly escaped from a Soviet Gulag camp in Chukchi Peninsula, Siberia. His supposed experiences were the basis for a book, a television series, and a film. Later research strongly indicates that Cornelius Rost's escape story is not true.

== Life ==
Rost was born on 27 March 1919 in Kufstein, Tyrol, Austria. He was living in Munich when the Second World War broke out, and during the war, he was captured by the Soviet Army. By his own statement, made in 1942, he held the rank of private, although Clemens Forell, his alias in his novel, was depicted as a Wehrmacht officer.

According to the Munich registration office, Rost returned from war imprisonment in Russia on 28 October 1947. In 1953, he started working in the in-house printing division of the Franz Ehrenwirth publishing house in Munich. After ruining numerous book covers, Rost said that he had been made color blind by being imprisoned in Soviet lead mines. Seeking an explanation, Ehrenwirth learned of Rost's prisoner of war experiences. Sensing a good story, Ehrenwirth asked Rost to write down his recollections. Rost's script was of very poor quality, but Ehrenwirth was keen on the story and hired professional writer Josef Martin Bauer to get the material into shape.

== Book ==
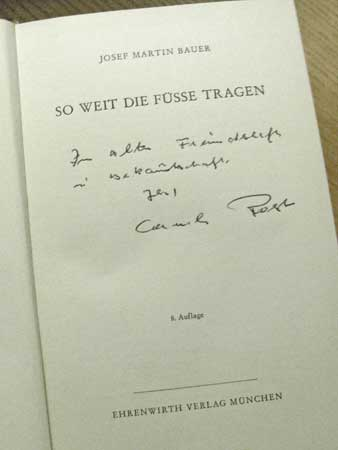
Personal dedication of C. Rost in an early book edition

Allegedly fearing a possible backlash by the post-war Allied authorities, Rost agreed to an oral interview only after being granted the use of the alias Clemens Forell. Bauer then processed the eight hours of taped material into his famous 1955 So weit die Füße tragen (As far as my feet will carry me).

In the 1960s, Rost used some of his recollections in his own paperback, Unternehmen Konterbande (Mission Contraband), but it was never printed or published. Bauer's novel, however, was translated into at least 15 languages and is still being re-published.

== Death ==
Rost died on 18 October 1983 and was interred at Munich's Central Cemetery.

== True identity ==
Almost 20 years after Rost's death, Ehrenwirth's son Martin revealed Rost's true identity to radio journalist Arthur Dittlmann, who researched the life of Bauer for a radio feature-documentary for the author's 100th birthday anniversary.

== Adaptations ==
In 1959, Rost's story was the subject of a six-part television adaption, starring the German character actor Heinz Weiss. When it was first aired, it quickly became Germany's first television blockbuster. In 2001, it was remade as the film As Far as My Feet Will Carry Me, starring Bernhard Bettermann as Forell. Added to the story was a duel between Forell and a Soviet officer who was chasing him, ending in a showdown on a bridge on the Soviet-Iranian border. Many scenes feature characters speaking Russian and other foreign languages, without any subtitles; the intention was to convey to German and other non-Russian viewers the feeling of helplessness experienced by the protagonist with his limited knowledge of Russian.

== Fraud Allegations ==
Currently Rost's escape story is widely dismissed. In addition to numerous factual errors (e.g., the supposed lead mine in the Chukchi Peninsula never existed), key points in his tale cannot be verified (e.g., his repatriation via Iran). After many years of research, in three broadcasts on Bayerischer Rundfunk on 2, 3 and 4 April 2010, the journalist Arthur Dittlmann concluded that Rost's descriptions cannot be true. As a result, within Germany today, Rost's tale is widely regarded as "eine Fälschung" (a fake).

== See also ==
- Sławomir Rawicz
- As Far as My Feet Will Carry Me
- Tivadar Soros
