= The Wishing Tree (Paretti novel) =

1975 novel by Sandra Paretti

The Wishing Tree (German: Der Wunschbaum) is a 1975 romance novel by Sandra Paretti.

== Plot summary ==
Camilla had always wished for more. It didn't take long for her to learn that wishes alone were not enough. She had seen her father's mansion built and paid for by dreams, not cash. And then she watched her family's resources collapse. Camilla decided not to repeat these mistakes. Married to a young man, she began to build a business that became successful in Berlin. However, when an old lover returned after many years, Camilla realized that her career was not her only concern. She wanted something different and was willing to take significant risks for that relationship.

It was made into a television miniseries in 2004 by ARD.
