= Jack Holborn =

- Genre: Adventure
- Based on: Jack Holborn by Leon Garfield
- Written by: Justus Pfaue; Sigi Rothemund
- Directed by: Sigi Rothemund
- Starring: Patrick Bach; Matthias Habich; Monte Markham; Terence Cooper; David Weatherley
- Opening theme: Sigi Schwab
- Composer: Christian Bruhn
- Countries of origin: West Germany; United Kingdom; New Zealand
- Original language: English
- No. of episodes: 6

Production
- Executive producers: Rowan Chapman; Keith Gosling
- Producers: Bernd Burgemeister (West Germany); Jack George (New Zealand)
- Production locations: Cook Islands; Dubrovnik, Croatia; Trogir, Croatia
- Cinematography: Rolf Deppe; Michael Heiter
- Editors: Heidrun Berktold; Michael Johns
- Running time: 290 minutes (UK DVD)

Original release
- Network: ZDF
- Release: 21 December – 30 December 1982

Jack Holborn was a 1982 ZDF Adventure TV mini-series. The story is based on the 1964 book by Leon Garfield. It was shown in the United Kingdom by ITV.

== Plot ==
Jack Holborn is a 13-year-old boy living in an orphanage in late 18th-century Bristol. Jack was found on the steps of a convent in Holborn in London when he was a toddler. He was wearing a leather armband with the name "Jack" on it. The nuns therefore called him Jack Holborn.

Jack wants to go to sea, but is put in a foster home instead. He runs away in order to join the crew of the "Charming Molly", a privateering vessel commanded by Captain Sheringham. At the sight of Jack's armband, the Captain unwittingly reveals that it looks familiar, but he won't tell Jack what he knows and refuses to keep him aboard.

Jack is desperately seeking answers to the mystery of his origins, and is not about to let the Captain off the hook. Meanwhile, the judge Lord Sheringham, who hates his twin brother the privateer for the dishonour that his side dealings with pirates have brought on their family, plans to bring the Captain to justice. Jack eventually manages to stow himself away on board the "Charming Molly," and the journey begins. A journey that will feature piracy, traveling through swamps and slavery.

== Cast ==
Character	Actor	Episode
Jack Holborn	Patrick Bach	All
Captain Sheringham Lord Sheringham	Matthias Habich	All
Trumpet	Monte Markham	3-6
Morris	Terence Cooper	1-4
Vronsky	Andreas Mannkopff	1-5
Admiral	Patrick Smyth	1-2, 6
Lady Myra	Tricia James	1-2, 6
Pobjoy	Jeremy Stevens	1-3
Harbourmaster	David Weatherley	1-2
Bosun	Frano Lasic	1
Fury	Stevo Petrovic	1
Mr. Arrows	Dragan Lakovic	1
Mrs. Arrows	Ljiljana Krstic	1
Clarke	Heinz Wanitschek	2-3
Sam	Miki Krstovic	2-3
Taploe	Franz Blauensteiner	2
Fox	Stole Arandjelovic	2
Carfax	Jovan Janicijevic	2
Thompson	Prince Tui Teka	5
Downs	Bozidar Pavecevil	5
Yoka	Teresa Waiariki	5
Captain Cox	Brian Flegg	1-2, 6
Palmer	Zoran Pokupec	Uncredited
Fared	Dusan Janicijevic	Uncredited
