= As Far as My Feet Will Carry Me =

2001 film by Hardy Martins

- Directed by: Hardy Martins
- Written by: Bastian Clevé; Hardy Martins; Bernd Schwamm
- Produced by: Hardy Martins
- Starring: Bernhard Bettermann; Michael Mendl; Anatoliy Kotenyov
- Music by: Eduard Artemyev
- Release date: 27 December 2001 (Germany)
- Running time: 158 minutes
- Country: Germany
- Languages: German; Russian; Persian; Chukchi
- Budget: $6 million USD

As Far as My Feet Will Carry Me (German: So weit die Füße tragen) is a 2001 film about German World War II prisoner of war Clemens Forell's escape from a Siberian Gulag in the Soviet Union back to Germany. It is based on the book of the same name written by Bavarian novelist Josef Martin Bauer. The book is in turn based on the story of Cornelius Rost who used the alias "Clemens Forell" to avoid retribution from the KGB. A previous television adaptation was produced in 1959.

== Plot ==
Clemens Forell is a German Wehrmacht soldier who was captured by the Soviets in 1945.

Forell is sentenced to 25 years hard labour for "crimes against the partisans" and sent as part of a large group of prisoners to a Gulag labour camp in the Siberian region of the Soviet Union. After a huge cross-continent railway journey on starvation rations, and a long-cross-country trek by foot into the bleak wilderness, they arrive at the gulag. This is run by a cruel commander, Lieutenant Kamenev. After one unsuccessful attempt, Forell ultimately does escape with the aid of the camp doctor, Dr. Stauffer. Stauffer had planned to escape himself, but is terminally ill with cancer, so he gives Forell warm clothes and a loaded pistol, and explains where he has hidden supplies for a long journey. Forell promises to visit the doctor's wife in Magdeburg and tell her that he is already dead. Forell heads north to avoid the guards, who would expect him to go west. When the supplies given to him by Dr. Stauffer run out, he kills a seal for food.

Over the winter, he wanders across northern Siberia, until he meets Anastas and Semyon, two gold prospectors. Although initially suspicious of them, Forell eventually joins them. After Semyon falls in a river and Forell rescues him, Semyon kills Anastas when he suspects him of stealing his gold. Semyon and Forell then continue their journey. When Semyon can no longer continue, Forell offers to carry his pack for him, but a suspicious Semyon throws him down a slope, thinking he too will try to steal his gold. Beset by wolves, Forell is rescued by nomadic Chukchi herders, one of whom, named Irina, falls in love with him.

After he makes a successful recovery, the Chukchi find out the Soviets are looking for Forell. Much to Irina's chagrin, Forell leaves, with the dog the Chukchi give him for companionship. When he runs into a logging operation, Forell is sent on the train with the freight as a brakeman. Betrayed, he is nearly captured by the Soviets, led by Kamenev. Although Forell manages to escape, his dog, Argish, is shot and killed when he attacks and mauls Kamenev, leaving him permanently scarred.

Over the next year, Forell makes his way to Central Asia. A Polish Jewish man helps him acquire a passport despite the fact that Forell is German, and Forell makes his way to the Iranian border. As he is walking to freedom, he sees Kamenev walking towards him from the Iranian side. Petrified, Forell stares at Kamenev and a showdown looms. However, Kamenev steps aside and lets Forell pass, declaring that "I have defeated you". Once on the Iranian side, Forell is believed to be a Soviet spy and taken prisoner. His uncle who works in Ankara, Turkey, however, is brought to identify him, and Forell is freed.

Arriving in West Germany at Christmas, Forell sees his family leave for church. He then arrives at the church, where he is reunited with his family.

== Cast ==
- Bernhard Bettermann as Clemens Forell
- Iris Böhm as Kathrin Forell
- Anatoliy Kotenyov as Oberleutnant Kamenev
- Michael Mendl as Dr. Stauffer
- Irina Pantaeva as Irina
- Hans-Uwe Bauer as Leibrecht
- André Hennicke as Bauknecht
- Antonio Wannek as Mattern
- Johannes Hitzbllech as Danhorn
- Stephen Wolf-Schömburg as Klugmann
- Irina Narbekova as Dr. Padmulova
- Hans Peter Hallwachs as Onkel Baudrexel
- Pavel Lebeshev as Lagerkommandant

== Production ==
Much of the film's dialogue is in languages other than German, such as Russian, Chukchi and Persian. At certain points in the film, no subtitles are provided, deliberately so as to impart upon the audience the sense of helplessness felt by the main character, who knows only some Russian.
