= Die merkwürdige Lebensgeschichte des Friedrich Freiherrn von der Trenck =

- Directed by: Fritz Umgelter
- Starring: Matthias Habich
- Country of origin: Germany

Original release
- Release: 1973 – 1973

Die merkwürdige Lebensgeschichte des Friedrich Freiherrn von der Trenck (English: The Peculiar Life Story of Friedrich, Baron von der Trenck) is a German television series based on the life of Friedrich von der Trenck, a Prussian officer, adventurer, and author. It ran for six episodes in 1973, and stars Matthias Habich as von der Trenck, alongside Rolf Becker (as Frederick the Great), Alf Marholm, and Nicoletta Machiavelli.
