= Sandra Paretti =

German writer and journalist (1935–1994)

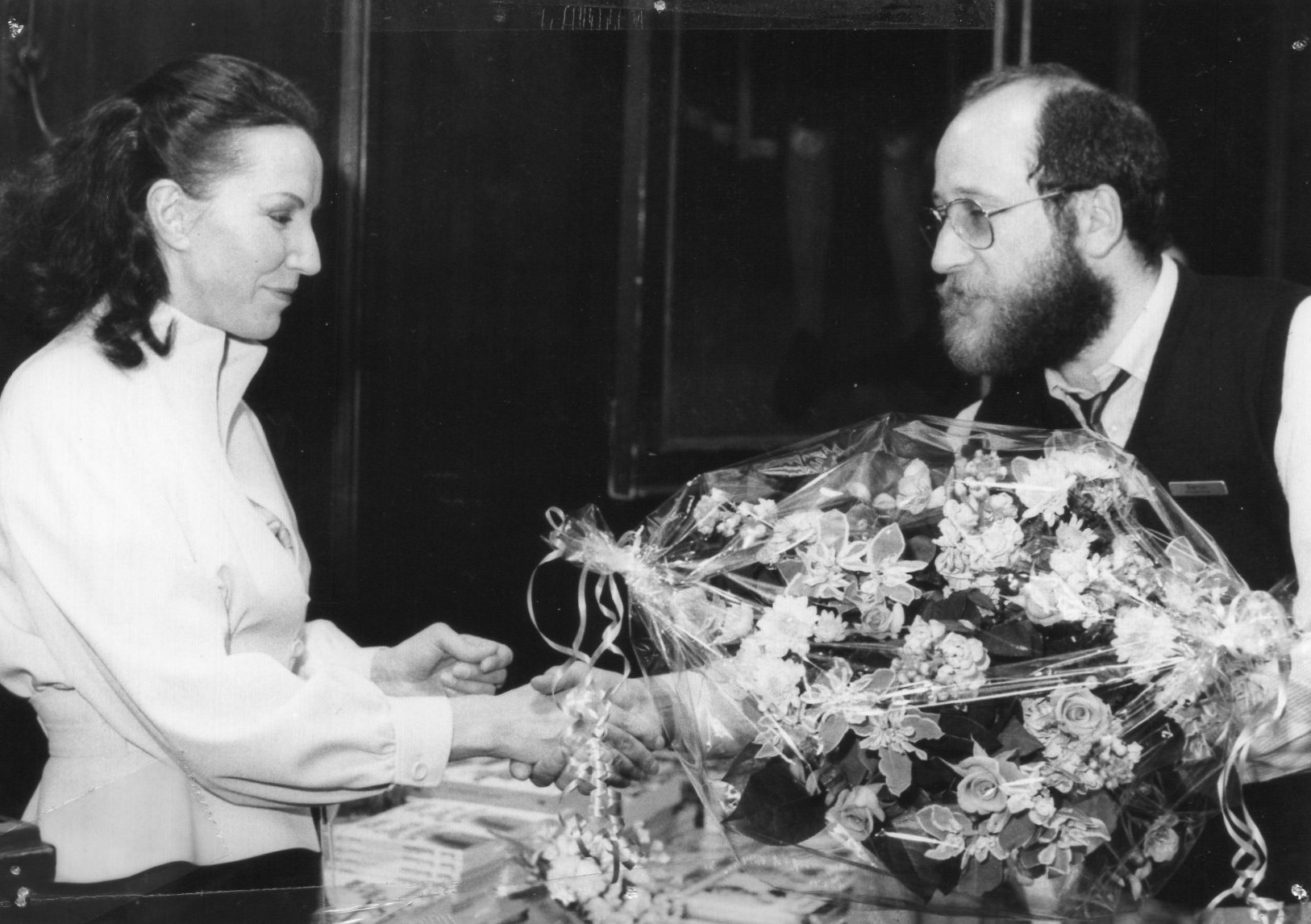
Sandra Paretti and B. M. B. in May 1985

Irmgard Schneeberger, also known by her pen name Sandra Paretti (Regensburg, 5 February 1935 - Zurich, 13 March 1994) was a German writer.

== Works ==
- Rose und Schwert (1967)
- Lerche und Löwe (1969)
- Purpur und Diamant (1971)
- Marlott 1970 (wieder als Clubausgabe in Anthologie von 1982: Das Beste von Konsalik… u.a.)
- Der Winter, der ein Sommer war (1972), filmed in 1976
  - als Heyne Taschenbuch; Wilhelm Heyne Verlag, München 1977, ISBN 3-453-00505-8.
- Die Pächter der Erde (1975)
- Der Wunschbaum (1975), filmed in 2004
- Das Zauberschiff (1977)
- Maria Canossa (1979)
- Das Echo deiner Stimme (1980)
- Paradiesmann (1983)
- Märchen aus einer Nacht (1985)
- Südseefieber (1986)
- Tara Calese (1988)
- Laura Lumati (1988)
- Mein Regensburger Welttheater (1989)
- Im Nixenkahn der Donau (1996)

== Bibliography ==
- Rosmarie Zeller: "Paretti, Sandra" in German, French and Italian in the online Historical Dictionary of Switzerland.
- Heinz Fischer (2001). "Paretti, Sandra". Neue Deutsche Biographie (in German). Vol. 20. Berlin: Duncker & Humblot. pp. 64–65. (full text online).
- Bernhard M. Baron, Sandra Paretti in Weiden. „Vielleicht bin ich doch eine Weidnerin?“, In: OBERPFÄLZER HEIMAT Bd. 50 (2006) Weiden i. d. OPf., S. 71 – 80. ISBN 3-937117-35-0.
