= Timm Thaler (1979 TV series) =

- Also known as: The Legend of Tim Tyler
- Genre: Children, mystery
- Based on: Timm Thaler by James Kruss
- Written by: James Krüss; Justus Pfaue; Peter M. Thouet
- Directed by: Sigi Rothemund
- Starring: Tommi Ohrner; Horst Frank; Richard Lauffen; Bruni Löbel; Stefan Behrens; Gerhart Lippert; Marlies Engel
- Theme music composer: Christian Bruhn
- Opening theme: Timm's Theme
- Country of origin: Germany
- Original language: German
- No. of episodes: 13

Original release
- Network: ZDF
- Release: 25 December 1979 – 4 January 1980

Timm Thaler (also known as The Legend of Tim Tyler: The Boy Who Lost His Laugh) is a 1979 children's television miniseries based on the 1962 children's novel by German writer James Krüss. The series originally aired in Germany as the first Christmas series on German national broadcaster ZDF. In 1983, the series was acquired for transmission in the United Kingdom by the BBC. The English version was produced by Angela Beeching, with script by Nel Romano, and retitled The Legend of Tim Tyler. It aired during Children's BBC in the weekday afternoons. The screenplay was written by Justus Pfaue and Peter M. Thouet and differs somewhat from the original novel. Directed by Sigi Rothemund, the series became a hit in Germany and made then 14-year-old Thomas Ohrner, in the lead role of Timm Thaler (Tim Tyler), a popular teen idol of the era. The role of the Baron was played by Horst Frank.

== Plot summary ==
Thirteen-year-old Timm Thaler (aka: Tim Tyler) has an irresistible laugh and is thus very popular. The mysterious Baron (in the novel his last name Lefuet is a German anadrome for devil, like "lived" is in English), a grumpy and very wealthy businessman always wearing a black carnation in his buttonhole, tries unsuccessfully to buy Timm's laugh. Timm's father is a flight instructor and dies during a flight for the Baron. It is indicated that this is caused by the Baron. Timm, after having lost his beloved father, is vulnerable to the Baron.

To financially support his stepmother, Timm no longer resists the Baron and swaps his laugh for the ability to win any bet he makes, no matter how absurd it is. If one of them tells about this pact, he loses his rights from the contract. The Baron and his servant Anatol use this new gift for business success. Timm however grows increasingly unhappy. He decides to get his laugh back. He tries several tricks only to realize that it takes a bet to get his laugh back.

== Cast ==
- Thomas Ohrner as Timm Thaler (Tim Tyler)
- Horst Frank as Baron de Lefouet (Baron Lived)
- Richard Lauffen as Anatol
- Bruni Löbel as Sister Agatha
- Stefan Behrens as Heinrich
- Gerhart Lippert as Friedemann Thaler
- Marlies Engel as Annemarie Thaler

== Differences from the novel ==
The most prominent story change is the journey of Timm, which in the novel takes four years but was reduced to several weeks in the screenplay so that a single actor could play the role of Timm. The screenplay also differed in that one of the themes in the novel, the criticism of social mores and capitalism is no longer a prominent element of the story. By portraying several of the protagonists as Catholic clerics, the narrative was instead imbued with a pseudo-religious tint.

Timm's bullying stepbrother is missing in the series, and his stepmother is depicted in a positive way, which is a stark contrast to her character in the novel. In the book, Timm's father is not a sports airplane pilot, thus, Timm originally meets the Baron, not at a family celebration at the local airport, but at the racetrack, a place he associates with his father who died in a building site accident when Timm was eleven.

The demonic but polite and urbane Signor Grandizzi from Genoa was replaced in the series by the dark servant Anatol. Several other characters are also changed or "exchanged" in the series, including the nun, Sister Agatha instead of Kreschimir and the ship's cook, Heinrich instead of the helmsman, Jonny. Also, Several new characters were introduced both on the protagonist's and the antagonist's sides.

== Locations ==
One of the central filming locations was the Mirador del Río, as well as the artificial pool of the Jameos del Agua, in Lanzarote, both designed by Cesar Manrique. These were used as the setting for the Baron's futuristic mountain lair. Additional Lanzarote locations were the Restaurant "La Era" in Yaiza, the city of Arrecife and the Timanfaya National Park.

The city scenes were shot in Hamburg, such as the Landungsbrücken and the airport in Hartenholm, 50 km north of Hamburg. The final parts were shot in the Radisson-SAS Hotel at the Congress-Centrum Hamburg (CCH). The final scene, where Tim gets his laugh back, was shot in front of the Hamburg district court and today's Brahmsplatz (then Karl-Muck-Platz).

== Trivia ==
- In 2002 a 26 episode animated series based on the novel was produced.
