= Bas-Boris Bode =

- Starring: Diana Körner
- Country of origin: Germany

Bas-Boris Bode is a German and Dutch television series, broadcast in 6 episodes in 1985.
