= Feuerdrachen =

- Written by: Michel Mansfeld
- Directed by: Peter Hagen
- Country of origin: East Germany

Feuerdrachen is an Eastern German television espionage series produced by the DEFA.

== See also ==
- List of German television series
