= As Far as My Feet Will Carry Me (TV series) =

- Genre: Drama
- Written by: Josef Martin Bauer; Fritz Umgelter
- Directed by: Fritz Umgelter
- Starring: Heinz Weiss
- Country of origin: West Germany
- Original language: German
- No. of series: 1
- No. of episodes: 6

Production
- Producer: Walter Pindter
- Running time: 400 minutes
- Production company: Norddeutscher Rundfunk

Original release
- Network: ARD
- Release: 12 February – 21 April 1959

As Far as My Feet Will Carry Me (German: So weit die Füße tragen) is a 1959 West German television series which was first broadcast on ARD on six episodes. It is based on the memoirs of Cornelius Rost detailing his escape from a Soviet gulag after being held as prisoner of war. It starred Heinz Weiss as Clemens Forell, the alias used by Rost.

Other actors who appeared in the series include Wolfgang Büttner, Johannes Buzalski, Hans Epskamp and Dietrich Thoms.

== Bibliography ==
Christiane Wienand. Returning Memories: Former Prisoners of War in Divided and Reunited Germany. Boydell & Brewer, 2015.
