= Mandara (TV series) =

- Created by: Justus Pfaue
- Directed by: Franz Josef Gottlieb
- Starring: Horst Frank
- Composer: Jürgen Knieper
- Country of origin: Germany

Mandara is a German television series.

== See also ==
- List of German television series
