= Timm Thaler (novel) =

1962 children's novel by James Krüss

Timm Thaler oder Das Verkaufte Lachen
- Author: James Krüss
- Language: German
- Genre: Science fiction
- Publication place: Germany
- ISBN: 4-89642-097-7
- Followed by: Timm Thalers Puppen oder Die verkaufte Menschenliebe

Timm Thaler oder Das verkaufte Lachen (roughly translated as Timm Thaler, or the Traded Laughter and best known as simply Timm Thaler) is a 1962 children's novel by German author James Krüss.

Regarded by the Oxford Encyclopedia of Children's Literature as Krüss' best known children's book, Timm Thaler tells the story of a boy who trades his enchanting laughter to a wealthy mysterious Mephistopheles-like Baron in exchange for the ability to win any bet he makes. Regretting the exchange, he undertakes a four-year journey to win his laughter back.

In 1979, Krüss wrote a sequel novel, Timm Thalers Puppen oder Die verkaufte Menschenliebe (roughly translated as Timm Thaler's Puppets, or the Traded Love for Mankind).

== Plot ==
=== Frame story ===
The first-person narrator Boy (identical to the author James Krüss in his biographical details) meets the adult Timm Thaler in a Leipzig printing shop shortly after World War II, where Timm recounts the story of his childhood over several evenings. A man whom Boy had met under mysterious circumstances on the train to Leipzig reappears and tries to bribe him not to write down the story; the narrator refuses, stating that writing is more important to him than money. It later turns out that this mysterious man plays an important role in Timm's story. The narrator remarks that the story reminds him of Adelbert von Chamisso's Peter Schlemihl.

=== Timm Thaler's story ===
Timm Thaler is an orphan boy living in the 1920s with his stepmother and stepbrother in a large city in central Germany. He has fond memories of his father, who died in a construction accident during Timm's fourth school year; among other things, he associates him with the local horse racing track. Harassed by his stepbrother and driven by nostalgic feelings, he goes there once more and encounters Baron Lefuet ("Teufel" spelled backwards). Over the following weeks, the Baron grows closer to him and eventually buys his laughter through a contract in exchange for the enticing ability to win any bet.

Timm uses his abilities but realizes too late how much his laughter means to him and tries to get it back. To track down the Baron, who has gone into hiding since the contract was signed, he leaves his hometown for Hamburg, as he had long harbored the wish to go to sea. He signs on as a steward aboard the cargo-passenger ship Delphin, bound for Genoa. In his search for his laughter, he escalates into ever more outlandish bets in the hope of one day losing a bet, which would invalidate the contract and return his laughter. However, he soon discovers that his opponent possesses at least extraordinary abilities and seems to have mysterious knowledge of Timm's plans; moreover, he must adhere to the gag clause that prohibits him from speaking about his lost laughter or his betting prowess. Fortunately, he finds friends along the way, foremost the mysterious Kreschimir, who is also contractually bound to the Baron, is familiar with his "diabolical" methods and goals, and gradually guesses Timm's contract.

In constant hope of losing, Timm eventually bets that he will become richer than the Baron. The Baron thereupon fakes his own death, names Timm his universal heir, and assumes the identity of his alleged twin brother, who now acts as Timm's guardian. This places Timm entirely under the Baron's direct influence, with the aim of discouraging him from wanting to regain his laughter. When Timm is separated from his previous friends, they manage, after some mishaps and with the help of a disloyal business associate of the Baron, to reunite, outwit the Baron, free Timm from his clutches, and restore his laughter through a surprisingly simple solution.

In the end, the now-adult Timm establishes his own marionette theater in Hamburg, where he performs the story of the sold laughter, based on his own life.

== Background ==
To emphasize the "diabolical" nature, Krüss used the ananym "Lefuet" for the Baron's name, which reads "Teufel" backwards.

The book contains social and consumer critique, particularly in the depictions of Timm's stepmother's social ascent and the Baron's capitalism as a religion. The Baron's "satanic" traits and those of his accomplices, such as the demon Behemoth disguised as Signor Grandizzi, appear rather peripherally, though they are needed to explain the Baron's partially supernatural-seeming abilities in the plot. In contrast, there are positive descriptions of Timm's petty bourgeois existence, his friendship with shipping director Rickert and his mother, the sailor Jonny, and the steward Kreschimir, who sold his eyes to the Baron.

Other voices argue that Krüss draws the psychogram of Timm Thaler as that of an abused child. Krüss wrote the drama of a boy who is made compliant by an adult.

== Adaptations ==
A two-part radio play by Kurt Vethake was released by Zebra-Verlag.

The novel was adapted in 1979 into the 13-part TV series Timm Thaler. Thomas Ohrner played the title role, and Horst Frank portrayed the Baron. The series was the first of 16 ZDF Christmas series. In 1981, the Soviet Union released a two-part feature film adaptation titled "Проданный смех" (German: Das verkaufte Lachen). In 2002, the 26-part German animated series Timm Thaler was released.

In 2009, Grażyna Kania staged the theater adaptation Timm Thaler oder das verkaufte Lachen at the Theater an der Parkaue in Berlin.

In 2017, Timm Thaler oder das verkaufte Lachen, directed by Andreas Dresen, was released in cinemas, with Arved Friese in the lead role and Justus von Dohnányi as Timm's adversary.

== Timm Thaler / Lefuet / Boy in other novels by James Krüss ==
In 1977, Krüss wrote a sequel titled Timm Thalers Puppen, depicting a renewed encounter between Boy, the adult Timm Thaler, his son Krescho, and the Baron.

In 1986, another sequel titled Nele oder Das Wunderkind was published, set in Hamburg in the 1950s. Nele, a child friend of Boy, is made into a great singer by Lefuet but in return is never allowed to cry. To help her, Boy enlists Timm Thaler.

Timm Thaler also appears as a character in the stories from Tante Julies Haus, created in the early 1970s. Here, Krüss describes the first meeting between the youthful Boy and Timm in the 1930s on Helgoland. When they part, Timm promises Boy that he will one day tell him his life story.

Lefuet also makes a brief appearance in Freunde von den Hummerklippen, another story narrated by Boy.

Boy is additionally the narrator (or frame narrator) in some other books by Krüss, including Die glücklichen Inseln hinter dem Wind.

All novels and stories featuring Timm Thaler, Boy, Lefuet, and other characters were compiled and expanded by Krüss in the 1970s as the cycle Die Geschichten der 101 Tage.

== See also ==
- Timm Thaler (1979 TV miniseries) (English Wikipedia)
- The Traded Laughter (1981 TV film) (Russian Wikipedia)
- Timm Thaler (2002 animated series) (German Wikipedia)
- Timm Thaler oder Das verkaufte Lachen (2017 film) (German Wikipedia)
