= Patrick Bach =

German actor

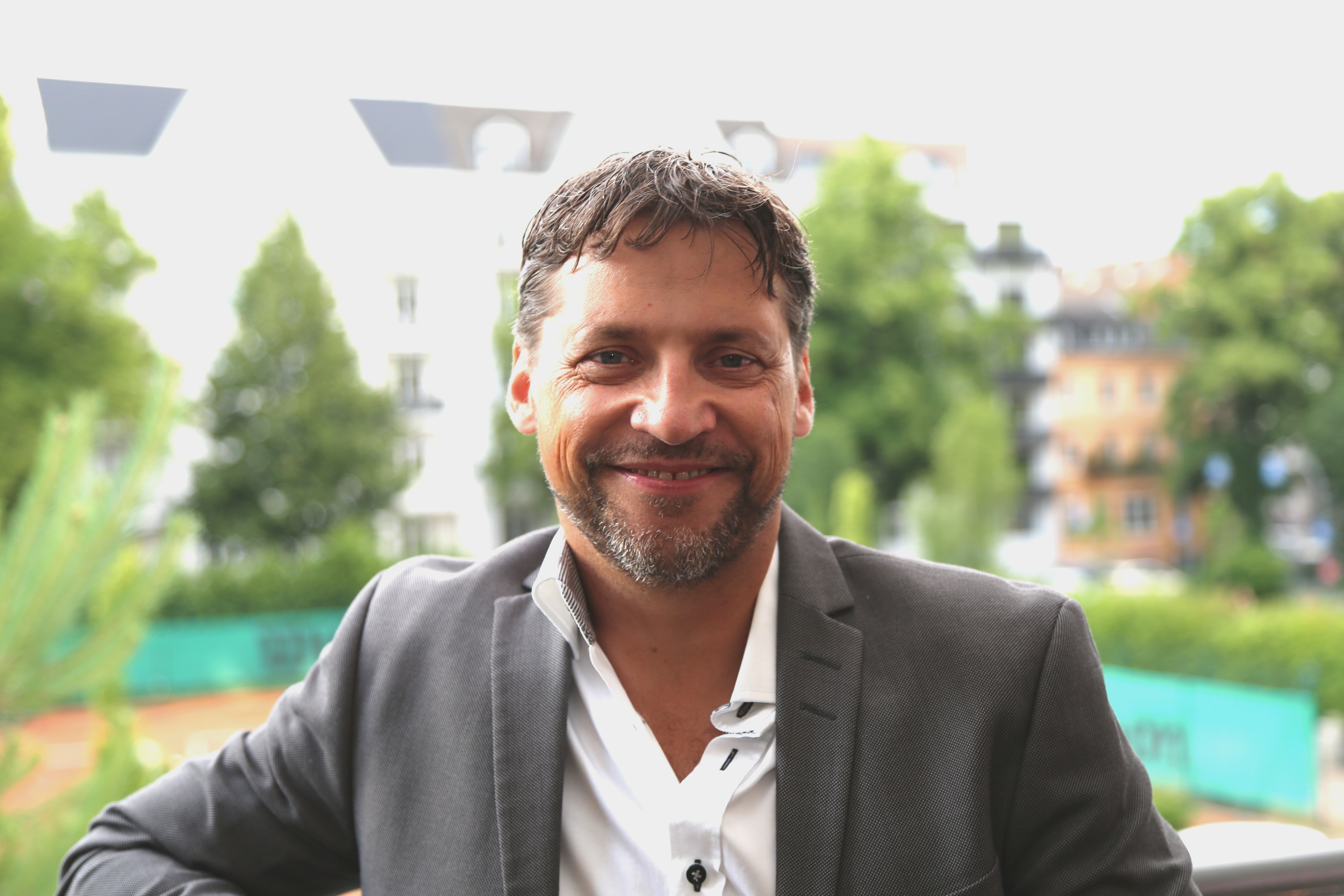
- Bach in 2017
- Born: 30 March 1968 (age 58); Hamburg, West Germany
- Occupation: Actor
- Years active: 1981–present
- Website: www.patrick-bach.de

Patrick Bach (born 30 March 1968) is a German actor. He was discovered while playing a football game and was given the title role in the miniseries Silas, based on the books by Cecil Bødker.

Bach is best known for his lead roles in the two miniseries Silas (1981) and Jack Holborn (1982). He is married, with two children, and currently lives with his family in Hamburg. He is the German voice of Samwise Gamgee in Peter Jackson's The Lord of the Rings film trilogy and Twoflower in Terry Pratchett's The Colour of Magic.

== Bibliography ==
- Holmstrom, John. The Moving Picture Boy: An International Encyclopaedia from 1895 to 1995. Norwich, Michael Russell, 1996, p. 370-371.
