= Sternensommer =

- Created by: Justus Pfaue
- Starring: Rainer Hunold; Nadja Tiller; Karin Baal; Rudolf Schündler
- Country of origin: Germany

Sternensommer (English: Summer Of Stars) is a German children's and youth television series that aired in 1981 on ZDF. Originally 12 episodes were planned, but, ultimately for cost reasons, only six were produced.

== Synopsis ==
Jochen Feucht moved with his family in a foreign city, because his father (Rainer Hunold) is there to take up a position as manager of the local chemical plant. This work is preparing for a long time a major headache for the locals, as mysterious things going on. Increasingly there will be incidents, and especially the smog, which has its origins in a chemical plant nearby. Jochen became friends with Michael Glasuschek, the grandson of Mr. Glasuschek, who leads an antique's shop in the same city. Mr. Glasuschek recently gets a visit from a scary-looking lady, who calls herself Dr. Markward (Nadja Tiller) and has a particular interest in the business and a doll that is actually not for sale. This doll, which can occasionally be alive is a reflection of her follower Tobias.

Jochen and Michael watch the stars one night, because they make an eerie acquaintance. Suddenly, an old man, who introduces himself as Lodeweik (Rudolf Schündler), with an odd little tree space. He tells them that he had come from the planet Krypton to Earth and need help, because destroying the planet Krypton. Xenon wanted and that even the whole earth was in danger. Next he tells of the conflict between Krypton, a planet of cold and Xenon, on a scorching heat prevails. As it turns out, are Mrs. Markward and her mysterious companion Tobias emissaries of the planet Xenon, to pursue and make the Lodeweik. For Earth, they are planning a series of disasters, and use the chemical plant as a secret base. In the shop of Glasuscheck is an old mirror, which can move with Markward and Tobias through time. It starts a wild chase to Lodeweik. Even Mr. Feucht, father of Jochen, is increasingly recognizing the threat posed particularly by the power plant, and is working diligently to find a solution. He brings himself into trouble and escapes an assault. Michael and Jochen are Lodeweik's friends with this and try to help as far as they can.

== Episodes ==
1. Scary visit
2. The man who walks in the cold
3. Tobia's turn
4. Lodeweik who loses out
5. Mrs. Markward plays the harp
6. An opportunity for all

== See also ==
- List of German television series
