= Bio's Bahnhof =

German music talk show

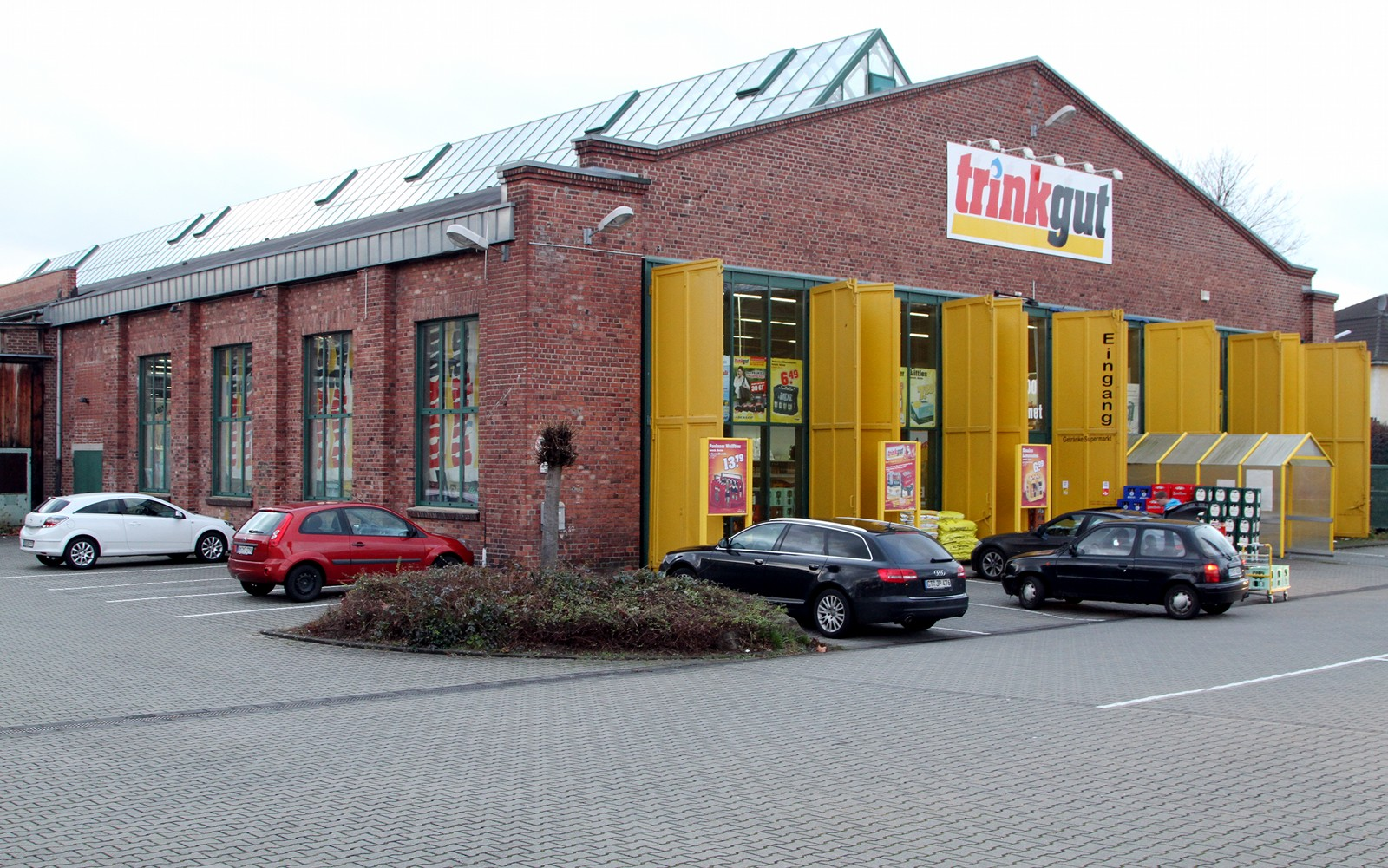
- A former railroad depot, location of filming, Frechen, in December 2011
- Genre: Music talk show
- Presented by: Alfred Biolek
- Country of origin: Germany
- Original language: German

Production
- Production location: Frechen
- Running time: 90

Original release
- Network: ARD (WDR)
- Release: 9 February 1978 – 2 October 1982

Bio's Bahnhof (Bio's station) was a music talk show presented by Alfred Biolek on German television from 1978 to 1982. It was produced live with performers of a wide range of music genres in a former railroad depot. Biolek was awarded the Adolf-Grimme-Preis in gold for the series in 1983.

== Program ==
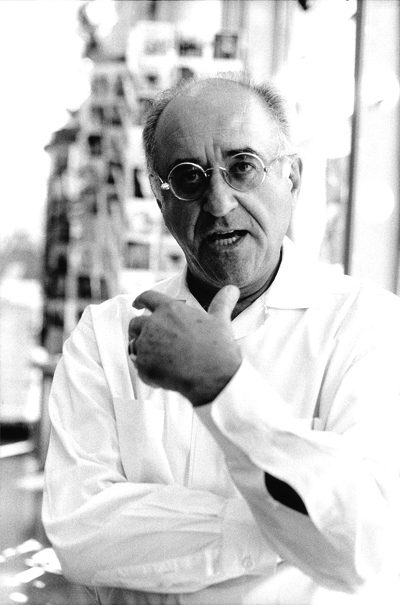
Alfred Biolek

Alfred Biolek tried a new concept in Bio's Bahnhof, which he conceived for the broadcaster WDR in Cologne: a mix of music genres, and an unusual setting in a former industrial site. He collaborated with stage designers Dieter Flimm and Wolf Nöhren. Flimm searched for large halls with an original atmosphere around Cologne, and found a tram depot in Bonn, and a former depot of the Köln-Frechen-Benzelrather Eisenbahn in Frechen, which was chosen.

The central idea of Bio's Bahnhof was a mix of many music genres, including pop music, hunting ensemble, classical music and contemporary music such as Karlheinz Stockhausen and Mauricio Kagel. Biolek talked with composers and performers, meeting many representatives of the different styles.

Kate Bush made her first television appearance in the first issue of Bio's Bahnhof. The show also presented dance ensembles, but rarely as they were expensive, compared to individual performers. Sammy Davis Jr. was available for only 5,000 DM, because Fritz Rau used the appearance as advertisement for his tours. Stars were encouraged to present something unusual, for example a duet of two artists who normally don't perform together; in 1979 Adriano Celentano sang a duet with Elke Sommer, Angelo Branduardi with Esther Ofarim, in 1980 Udo Lindenberg performed with Nana Mouskouri, and in 1982 Mario Adorf with Milva. The American Helen Schneider performed the German traditional "Heidenröslein" in 1978. Biolek, as amateur, sometimes performed with his guest, dancing with Hazy Osterwald and the Kessler-Zwillinge, singing with Caterina Valente and participating in a "clowns" act.

Each show was meant to present one humorous entry, such as comedian Emil Steinberger. The group Folies Parisiennes, of men dressed like Mireille Mathieu and presenting her song "Akropolis Adieu", had to come a second time by popular demand.

In 1982, Biolek decided that he had experimented in enough fields in the show, and wanted to try something else. A later sequel was named Bei Bio (At Bio's). Ten years after the last show, a special edition was aired on 2 October 1992 from the roundhouse of the former producer of locomotives, Orenstein & Koppel in Babelsberg.

== Awards ==
In 1983, Biolek was awarded the Adolf-Grimme-Preis in gold for the series.

== Episodes ==
Episode	Date	Guests
1	9 February 1978	Kate Bush, Udo Lindenberg, Vicky Leandros
2	6 April 1978	Helen Schneider
3	18 May 1978	Eberhard Schoener, The Police
4	7 September 1978	Julien Clerc, The King's Singers, Milva, Daniel Sander with Les Folies Parisiennes
5	2 November 1978	The Three Degrees, Eric Delaney, Daniel Sander with Les Folies Parisiennes, Ilse Werner, Herman van Veen, Helmut Zacharias
6	28 December 1978	
7	8 March 1979	Reinhild Hoffmann, Asha Puthli, Konstantin Wecker
8	3 May 1979	Adriano Celentano, Ivan Rebroff, Ludwig Streicher, Elke Sommer
9	23 August 1979	Bernard van Beurden, Angelo Branduardi, Trude Herr, Mircea Krishan, Esther Ofarim, Daniel Sander with Les Folies Parisiennes
10	25 October 1979	Ingrid Caven, Karl Dall, Peter Maffay, Eberhard Schoener
11	20 December 1979	Tim Curry, Marvelli jr., Sylvie Vartan, Gisela Uhlen, Alexis Weissenberg
12	7 February 1980	
13	3 April 1980	Tom Deininger, Elke Koska, Udo Lindenberg, Nana Mouskouri, HA Schult
14	15 May 1980	Marcia Haydée, Al Jarreau, Udo Jürgens, Elke Koska, HA Schult, Felicia Weathers
15	31 July 1980	Edoardo Bennato, Kessler Twins, Hildegard Knef, The Human League, Hazy Osterwald, Bernhard Paul
16	25 September 1980	Anke Engelke, André Heller, Nina Hagen, Klaus Nomi, Jérôme Savary, Alexis Weissenberg
17	20 November 1980	Juliette Greco, Pfuri Gorps & Kniri, Iannis Xenakis, Karl Vibach, Ensemble A Chorus Line of Theater des Westens
18	19 February 1981	Dieter Hallervorden, Biréli Lagrène, Limburger Domsingknaben, Julia Migenes, Joan Orleans, Daniel Sander with Les Folies Parisiennes, Gilbert O'Sullivan
19	11 June 1981	Biermösl Blosn, Ernst Fuchs, Stanisław Sojka, Margot Werner
20	20 August 1981	Deutsch Amerikanische Freundschaft, Julia Migenes, Jacob Sisters, Herman van Veen
21	24 September 1981	
22	22 Oktober 1981	Chi Coltrane, Joachim Fuchsberger, Herbert Grönemeyer, Wendelin Haverkamp, Robert Kreis, Jürgen von der Lippe, Edda Moser, Wolfgang Petersen
23	19 November 1981	
24	10 December 1981	Benny Goodman, Stephan Sulke
25	28 January 1982	Charles Aznavour, José Feliciano, Mülheimer Freiheit (artists group), Rosa von Praunheim
26	18 March 1982	Mario Adorf, Sammy Davis Jr., Milva, Martha Mödl, Dieter Schnebel
27	13 May 1982	Karan Armstrong, Kid Creole & the Coconuts, Thomas Freitag, Gitte Hænning, Mario Maya, Billy Preston, UKW
28	15 July 1982	Ray Charles
29	9 September 1982	Eisi Gulp, Udo Jürgens, Pepe Lienhard orchestra, Peter Maffay, Miriam Makeba, Tangerine Dream
30	28 October 1982	BAP, Rudi Carrell, Klaus Havenstein, Diether Krebs, Beatrice Richter, Michael Heltau, The King's Singers, Barış Manço, Ivo Pogorelich
31	2 October 1992	Die Prinzen, Thomas Kiessling, Annelie Leutheuser, Heike Förster, Mario Welker und the Brandenburger Symphoniker of the Brandenburger Theater (conductor: Heiko Matthias Förster), Annie Lennox, Nina Hagen, Udo Lindenberg, Die Jelly Rolls, Max Raabe and the Palast Orchester, Mary / Georg Preuße, choir of Leibniz-Gymnasium Potsdam, Regine Hildebrandt, Robert Feldmann, Siegfried Jakob, Wilfried Richter, Reinhard Brinksmeier, Brunhilde Lohberg, Hans Jaekel, Dr. Dietrich Rehbein, Rudolf Röhricht

== Documentation ==
- Bahnhof für Bio – Alfred Biolek wird 70. Documentation about the series Bio's Bahnhof with excerpts from the shows and interviews with Biolek, 2004, 100 min., book and direction: Klaus Michael Heinz, moderation: Anke Engelke and Hape Kerkeling, first aired on 10 July 2004 by WDR and NDR
