= Münchner Lach- und Schießgesellschaft =

German political kabarett

Coordinates: 48°9′43.00″N 11°35′26.81″E

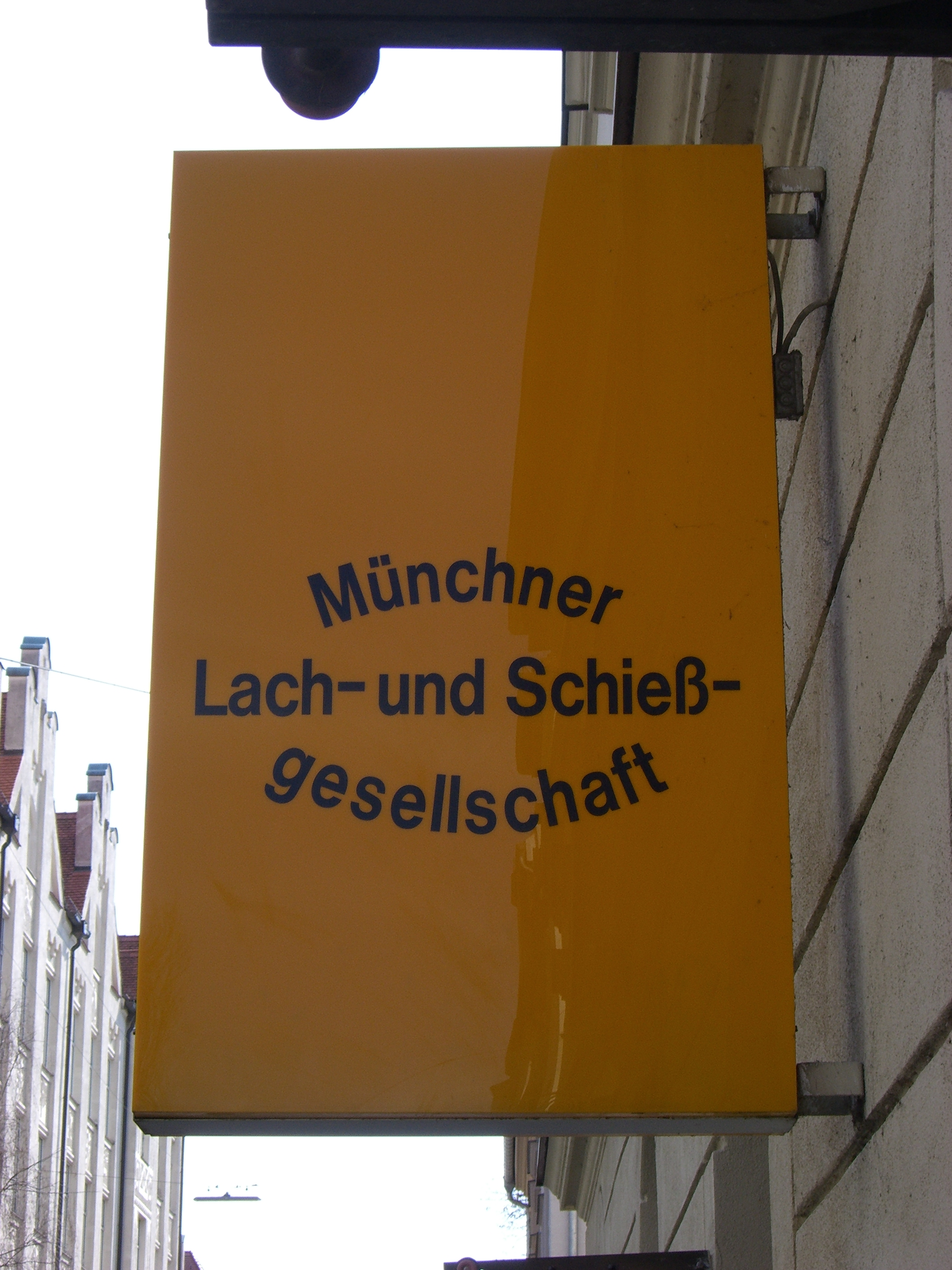
Sign

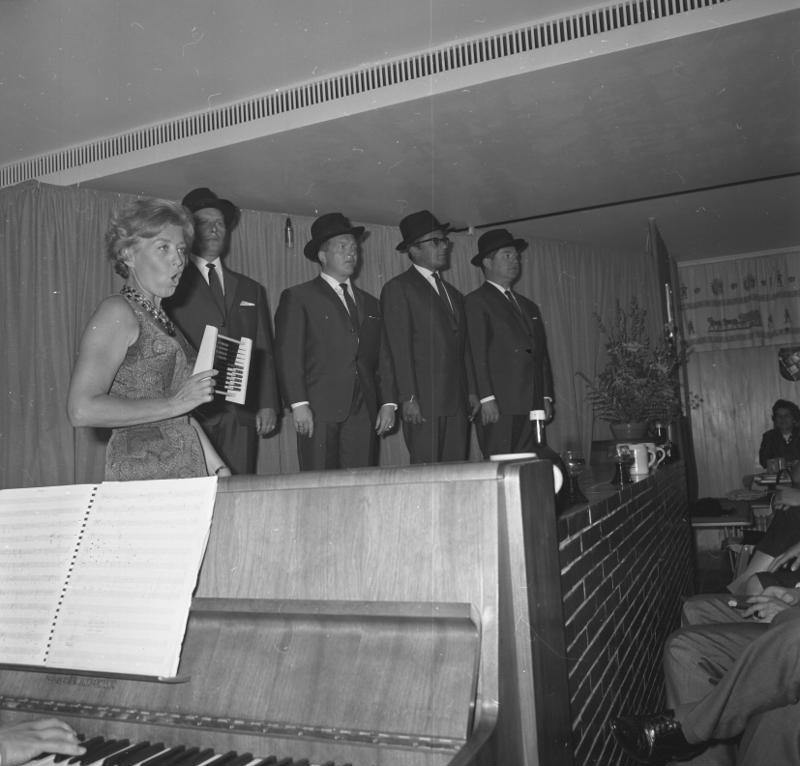
Münchner Lach- und Schießgesellschaft in 1964 (from left: Ursula Noack, Jürgen Scheller, Hans Jürgen Diedrich, Dieter Hildebrandt, Klaus Havenstein)

The Münchner Lach- und Schießgesellschaft (German: [ˈmʏnçnɐ ˈlax ʔʊnt ˈʃiːsɡəˌzɛlʃaft]; Munich laughing and shooting company) is a German political kabarett (satirical revue) that runs at its own theatre in Schwabing, Munich. It was founded in 1956 by journalist Sammy Drechsel and comedian Dieter Hildebrandt, who were soon joined by Klaus Peter Schreiner. Walter Kabel was responsible for the show's music from 1956 to 1972, which included his own compositions.

== History ==
In February 1952, Dieter Hildebrandt presented an improvised program with sketches at a carnival event of the faculty of theatre sciences at LMU Munich, with Gerd Potyka, Klaus Peter Schreiner and Guido Weber. The event at the Schwabing Alte Laterne was so successful that students were invited to appear twice a week in exchange for a meal and beer.

The journalist Sammy Drechsel secured Das Stachelschwein as a permanent venue and began to direct the shows. In 1956, the ensemble was named the Münchner Lach- und Schießgesellschaft, a parody of the security firm "Wach- und Schließgesellschaft". The first ensemble also included Ursula Herking, Klaus Havenstein and Hans Jürgen Diedrich. Their first program, Denn sie müssen nicht, was sie tun, premiered on 12 December 1956 and was broadcast by the ARD television channel in March 1957.

The ensemble dissolved in 1972. In 1976, a new group was formed in the old tradition. Hildebrandt, Klaus Peter Schreiner and Werner Schneyder wrote scripts until 1980.

== Performers ==
The kabarett performers included:

- Rainer Basedow (1976–1995)
- Veronika Faber (1976–1980)
- Bernd Stephan (1976–1980)
- Kurt Weinzierl (1976–1980)
- Jochen Busse (1980–1990)
- Bruno Jonas (1981–1984)
- Sibylle Nicolai (1983–1984)
- Renate Küster (1985–1990)
- Henning Venske (1985–1993)
- Hans-Jürgen Silbermann (1991–1999)
- Andreas Rebers (1997–1999)
- Holger Paetz (2002–2003)
- Viola von der Burg (2002–2003)
- Michael Altinger (2002–2003)
- Uli Bauer (2002–2003)
- Sonja Kling (2003–2010)
- Thomas Wenke (2003–2010)

The ensemble of 2010 consisted of Beatrix Doderer, Ecco Meineke and Severin Groebner. In 2011, the ensemble dissolved and the theater was used mostly by guest artists.

In October 2015, a new ensemble was formed by Caroline Ebner, Norbert Bürger, Sebastian Rüger and Frank Smilgies, which staged the 50th program of the Lach und Schieß as its debut. In 2018, Claudia Jacobacci succeeded Caroline Ebner.

== Awards ==
- 1963: Schwabinger Kunstpreis
- 1996: Swiss Kabarett Prize Cornichon

== Films ==
- 1960: Tour de Trance
- 1960: Sturm im Wasserglas
- 1960: Lampenfieber
- 1961: Wähl den, der lügt
- 1962: Überleben Sie mal
- 1962: Streichquartett
- 1963: Halt die Presse
- 1964: Krisen-Slalom
- 1966: Two Girls from the Red Star
- 1967: Die Spaßvögel

== Videos ==
- Halt die Presse, 1963 production, released in 1999
- Krisenslalom, 1963 production, released in 1999
- Schimpf vor 12, 1962 production, released in 1999

== Literature ==
- Klaus Peter Schreiner: Die Zeit spielt mit. Die Geschichte der Lach- und Schießgesellschaft. Kindler, München 1976 ISBN 3-463-00676-6 (Rowohlt Taschenbuch, Reinbek bei Hamburg 1978 ISBN 3-499-14257-0)
- Till Hofmann (ed.): Verlängert. 50 Jahre Lach- und Schießgesellschaft. Aufgeschrieben von Matthias Kuhn. Blessing, München 2006 ISBN 3-89667-319-X
