= The Roaring Fifties =

- Directed by: Peter Zadek
- Written by: Johannes Mario Simmel (novel); Robert Muller
- Produced by: Lutz Hengst; Wolfgang Limmer; Günter Rohrbach
- Starring: Juraj Kukura; Boy Gobert; Peter Kern
- Cinematography: Jost Vacano
- Edited by: Max Benedict
- Music by: Klaus Doldinger
- Production company: Bavaria Film
- Distributed by: Constantin Film
- Release date: 23 September 1983
- Running time: 126 minutes
- Country: West Germany
- Language: German

The Roaring Fifties (German: Die wilden Fünfziger) is a 1983 West German comedy film directed by Peter Zadek and starring Juraj Kukura, Boy Gobert and Peter Kern. It is based on the novel Hurra, wir leben noch by Johannes Mario Simmel. It is set around the German Wirtschaftswunder economic miracle of the 1950s, with the title alluding to the Roaring Twenties.

It was shot at the Bavaria Studios in Munich and on location at Neuschwanstein Castle. The sets were designed by the art directors Herbert Strabel and Rolf Zehetbauer.

== Cast ==
- Juraj Kukura as Jakob Fuhrmann
- Boy Gobert as Udo von Gerresheim
- Peter Kern as Franz Arnusch
- Nora Barner as Julia
- Christine Kaufmann as Natascha
- Sunnyi Melles as Bambi
- Beatrice Richter as Dr. Malthus
- Eva Mattes as Hilde Werwolf
- Dietrich Mattausch as Wenzel Prill
- Hermann Lause as Mario Schreiber
- Paul Esser as Senator Hilton
- Klaus Höhne as Colonel Hobson
- Ilja Richter as Reporter
- Willy Millowitsch as Professor Donner
- Freddy Quinn as General Mark Clark
- Sona MacDonald as Yün-Sin
- Christa Berndl as Mrs. Hilton
- Brigitte Mira as Mrs. Willmsen
- Dominique Horwitz as Mick
- Ingrid Caven as Claudine
- Charles Regnier as Igor
- Karl-Heinz Vosgerau as Rouvier
- Rudolf Lenz as Sir Derek
- Karl Lieffen as Major Blaschenko
- Burkhard Driest as Major Assimov
- Natias Neutert as the blind
- Guido Baumann
- Ulrich Wildgruber
- Udo Kier
- Uwe Friedrichsen
- Ivan Desny
- Margit Carstensen
- András Fricsay
- Bea Fiedler
- Curt Bois
- Diether Krebs
- Lou van Burg
