= Ursula Noack =

German cabaret artiste

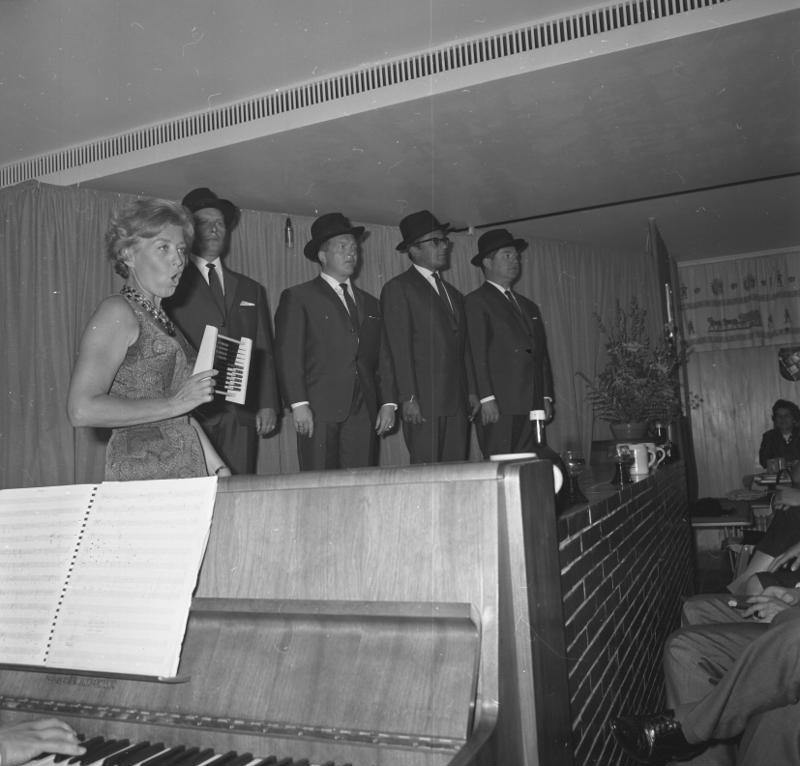
Ursula Noack (left)

Ursula Noack (7 April 1918 – 13 February 1988) was a German cabaret artiste, film and stage actress, radio drama performer and chanson singer who after 1945 made her career in the west—principally in Bavaria. During the 1960s and early 70s she became well known to television viewers through her appearances as a member of the five member Münchner Lach- und Schießgesellschaft (political cabaret group).

== Biography ==
=== Provenance and early years ===
Ursula Noack was born during the closing months of the First World War at Halle (Saxony) in central Germany. Her father was a church minister. Soon after leaving school, in 1937 or 1938, she embarked on a career as a stage actress, accepting a contract with the theatre at Erfurt. From the outset she became involved in "casting differences" with producers. Initially, as she would later recall, she was "always [expected to be] an angelic cutie, finger in mouth". A reputation for knowing her own mind would follow her through her career. According to one admirer, "Ursula Noack was emancipated long before the women's movement became focused on the concept".

After the war Halle found itself administered as part of the Soviet occupation zone. Noack enjoyed early successes as a cabaret artiste in shows with the Leipziger Schauspielhaus (theatre company), accommodated at that time in the Centraltheater building. Leipzig had also ended up under Soviet military administration in July 1945. In 1948 Noack relocated to the west, now pursuing her stage career at Hamburg (in the British zone) and Bremen (for strategic-logistical reasons, in the American zone). She became a frequent presence on the local radio stations. But by the end of the decade it was obvious that cabaret was her first love, and it was in cabaret shows that she was already establishing her reputation as a stage performer in West Germany's (Note: The American, British and French occupations zones were grouped together, relaunched and rebranded as the US-sponsored German Federal Republic (West Germany) in May 1949, following the 1948 currency reforms, and in the aftermath of the year-long Soviet Siege of Berlin which followed these.) two largest northern port cities. As early as 1946 she was also performing to lyrics by Erich Kästner at the "Schaubüde" cabaret founded in Munich by four theatre people and writers – including Kästner – the previous year. During the early 1950s Noack teamed up with Hanne Wieder, Joachim Hackethal, and Hans Jürgen Diedrich to form what became "Die Amnestierten" ("The Amnestied ones"), a touring cabaret troupe with its home-base in Kiel, to the north, even, of Hamburg. Described initially as a "student" cabaret troupe, "Die Amnestierten" quickly became known across West Germany. It was also through "Die Amnestierten" that shortly after this Noack first met the cabaret pianist-composer Walter Kabel (1927–1997), whom in 1967 she would marry.

=== Lach- und Schießgesellschaft ===
Noack came to prominence on account of her membership of the Munich-based cabaret ensemble "Lach- und Schießgesellschaft" ("Laughing and shooting society"). She joined the group in (probably) 1958 through Diedrich, with whom she had worked earlier on the decade as one of the "Amnestierten". Other regular group members at that time were Ursula Herking, Klaus Havenstein and Dieter Hildebrandt. The first show in which she worked with the troupe was called "Eine kleine Machtmusik" ("A little power music" – a reference to Mozart). The troupe normally comprised four men and one woman: it appears that in 1958 Noack filled the place that would otherwise have been taken by Ursula Herking for the Munich production. Noack did not tour with the production that year. In 1959, however, she became a full-time troupe member in succession to Herking, who had been juggling her cabaret work with an increasingly successful and career as a film actress. It was therefore Noack who was the one woman in the five person troupe through and beyond the 1960s, during which the Lach- und Schießgesellschaft television appearances became something of a national institution.

=== Later years ===
In 1971 Noack was one of the high-profile media stars who put their names to the "We've had abortions!" campaign, designed to highlight short-comings in the West German abortion laws of the time. Regardless of whether she ever had undergone abortion, or was merely one of those who had – as one or two admitted some years later – merely signed the statement out of solidarity, Noack's participation added weight to the campaign.

In 1972 the Lach- und Schießgesellschaft group broke up. (Note: It has subsequently re-formed with different members on more than one occasion.) Ursula Noack retreated, for the most part, into private life principally, it was reported, for health reasons. She was nearly a decade older than her husband, who continued to work in show business: Walter Kabel's own retirement was less abrupt. The two of them continued to live together just outside Munich. For the next ten years or so Noack made occasional cameo stage appearances, and her voice could be heard on the radio, albeit rarely. She was diagnosed with cancer in the mid-1980s. Noack died on 13 February 1988.

Her physical remains were buried in the family grave in the "Forest Cemetery" at Grasbrunn on the edge of Munich.
