= Beatrice Richter =

German actress, entertainer (born 1948)

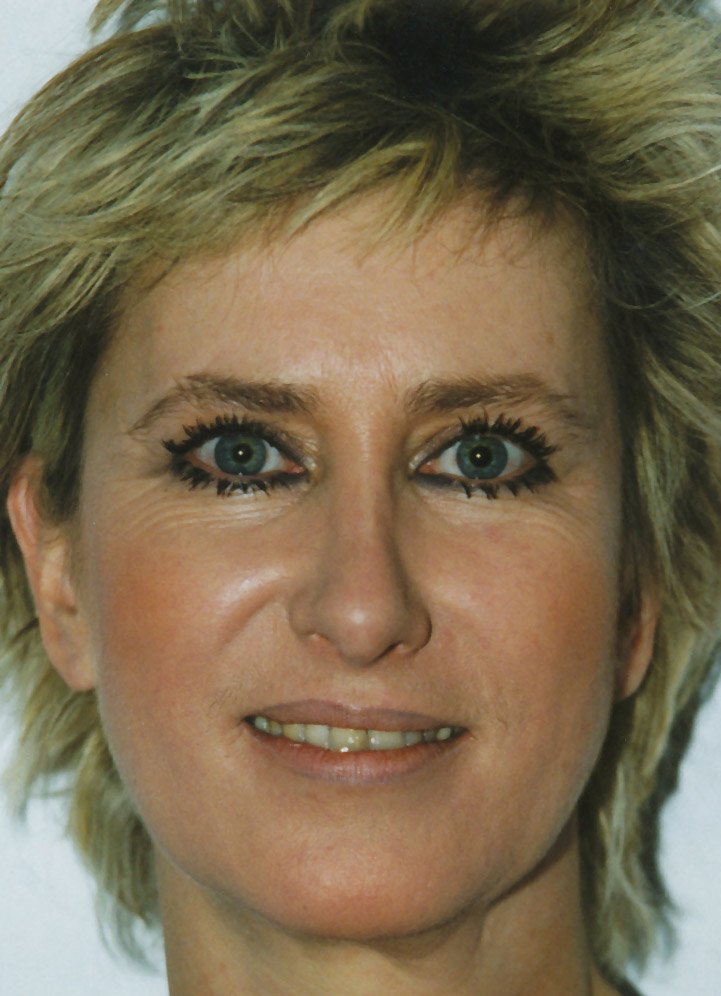
- Born: 20 December 1948 (age 77); Munich, Germany
- Occupations: Television actress, Jazz singer, Comedian
- Known for: her appearances in the 1980s-German-comedy-shows Rudis Tagesshow and Sketchup

Beatrice Richter (German: [ˈbə.a.tʁiːs ˈʁɪç.tɐ]; born 20 December 1948) is a German TV actress, comedian, cabaret artist and jazz singer.

Beatrice Richter concluded an acting education at the Otto Falckenberg School of the Performing Arts in Munich, which was followed by a jazz dance training under Frank Hatchett in New York.

She began her career with Diether Krebs and Klaus Havenstein at the side of Rudi Carrell in the Radio Bremen comedy program Rudis Tagesshow, which ran from 1981 till 1987. For her parody performances she was awarded the Goldene Kamera in 1982. She gained further recognition as partner of Diether Krebs in the sketch comedy serial Sketchup (Bayerischer Rundfunk, 1984–1986), her role was later taken over by Iris Berben. Beatrice Richter furthermore starred in several films with among others Walter Giller and Peter Alexander and also appeared in theater plays. In 1989 she was seen in the episode "Hilfe eine Aushilfe!" ("Help a temp!") of the television series Meister Eder und sein Pumuckl. Since 1996 she entertained, also as a singer, in her own jazz cabaret show.

In 2004 she appeared on stage with Peter Schmidt-Pavloff, Johannes Heesters, Cordula Trantow and Fred Alexander in Hugo von Hofmannsthal's play Jedermann in front of the Cologne Cathedral. There she played the roles of the Journeyman, the Devil and the Mammon. In 2008 she played the role of Rosmathilda Polterman at the Karl May Festival in Bad Segeberg.

Photos of her appeared in the August 1982 edition of the German Playboy magazine.

She is the mother of actress Judith Richter (born 1978), who originates from a temporary relationship with the actor Heinz Baumann.

== Selected filmography ==
- 1971: Der kopflose Falke
- 1973: Verurteilt
- 1975: The Concert
- 1977: Die Kette
- 1981: Trokadero
- 1983: Mit mir nicht, du Knallkopp
- 1983: Laß das – ich haß’ das
- 1983: The Roaring Fifties
- 1984: Beautiful Wilhelmine
- 1984/1985: Sketchup
- 1985: Der kleine Riese
- 1987: Derrick
- 1988: The Black Forest Clinic
- 1989: Der Landarzt
- 1989: Meister Eder und sein Pumuckl
- 1989: The Adventures of Dr. Bayer
- 1990–2008: The Old Fox
- 1994: Salto Postale
- 1995: Tatort
- 2003: Cleaning Up
- 2005: Leipzig Homicide
- 2007/2008: In aller Freundschaft
- 2008: Siska
- 2009: SOKO 5113
- 2009: Da kommt Kalle
- 2009: Großstadtrevier
- 2012: München 7
