= Alice Schwarzer =

German journalist, publisher and feminist

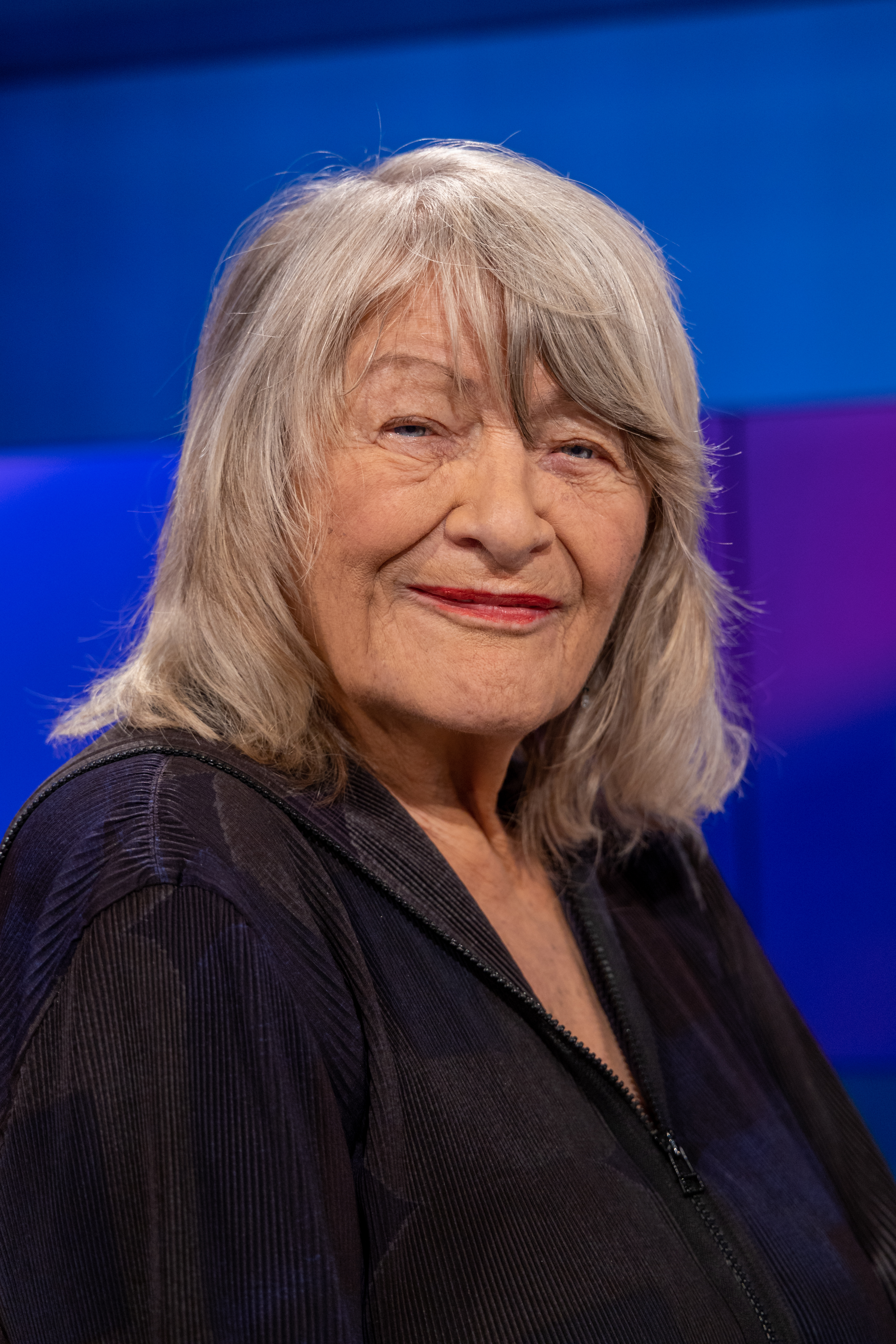
- Schwarzer in 2022
- Born: 3 December 1942 (age 83); Wuppertal, Nazi Germany
- Occupations: Journalist; Feminist; Publisher; Author
- Organization: Emma
- Awards: Order of Merit of the Federal Republic of Germany; Bambi Award; Legion of Honour; Ludwig Börne Prize; Mercator Professorship Award

Alice Sophie Schwarzer (born 3 December 1942) is a German journalist and prominent feminist. She is founder and publisher of the German feminist journal Emma. Beginning in France, she became a forerunner of feminist positions against anti-abortion laws, for economic self-sufficiency for women, against pornography, prostitution, female genital mutilation, and for a position on women in Islam. She authored many books, including biographies of Romy Schneider, Marion Dönhoff, and herself.

== Biography and positions ==
Schwarzer was born in Wuppertal, the daughter of a young single mother, and was raised by her grandparents in Wuppertal; she described them as anti-Nazis. During World War II, they were evacuated to Bavaria, only returning to the Ruhr district in 1950. After learning French in Paris, Schwarzer began a trainee job in journalism in Düsseldorf in 1966, and was sent to Paris as a correspondent.

From 1970 to 1974, she worked as a freelancer for different media outlets in Paris. At the same time, she studied psychology and sociology in classes lectured by Michel Foucault, among others. Schwarzer met Jean-Paul Sartre and Daniel Cohn-Bendit. She was one of the founders of the Feminist Movement in Paris (Mouvement de libération des femmes, MLF), and also spread their ideas to Germany. In April 1971, Schwarzer joined Simone de Beauvoir, Jeanne Moreau, Catherine Deneuve, and 340 French women in publicly announcing that they had had illegal abortions, in a successful campaign to legalize abortion in France.

She convinced the Stern magazine to do something similar in Germany; and in June 1971, Schwarzer and 374 German women, including Romy Schneider and Senta Berger, confessed that they had an abortion in a campaign to legalize abortion in Germany. Decades later, Schwarzer revealed she had never had an abortion. She called her project Frauen gegen den § 218 ("Women against Section 218", which is the section of the German Penal Code that makes abortion illegal). In autumn 1971, Schwarzer released her first book of the same title. The illegality of abortion was upheld by the German Constitutional Court abortion decision, 1975.

One of Schwarzer's best-known books is Der kleine Unterschied und seine großen Folgen (The little difference and its great consequences), which was released in 1975 and made her famous beyond Germany. It was translated into eleven languages. Since its release, Schwarzer has become Germany's most high-profile but also most controversial feminist.

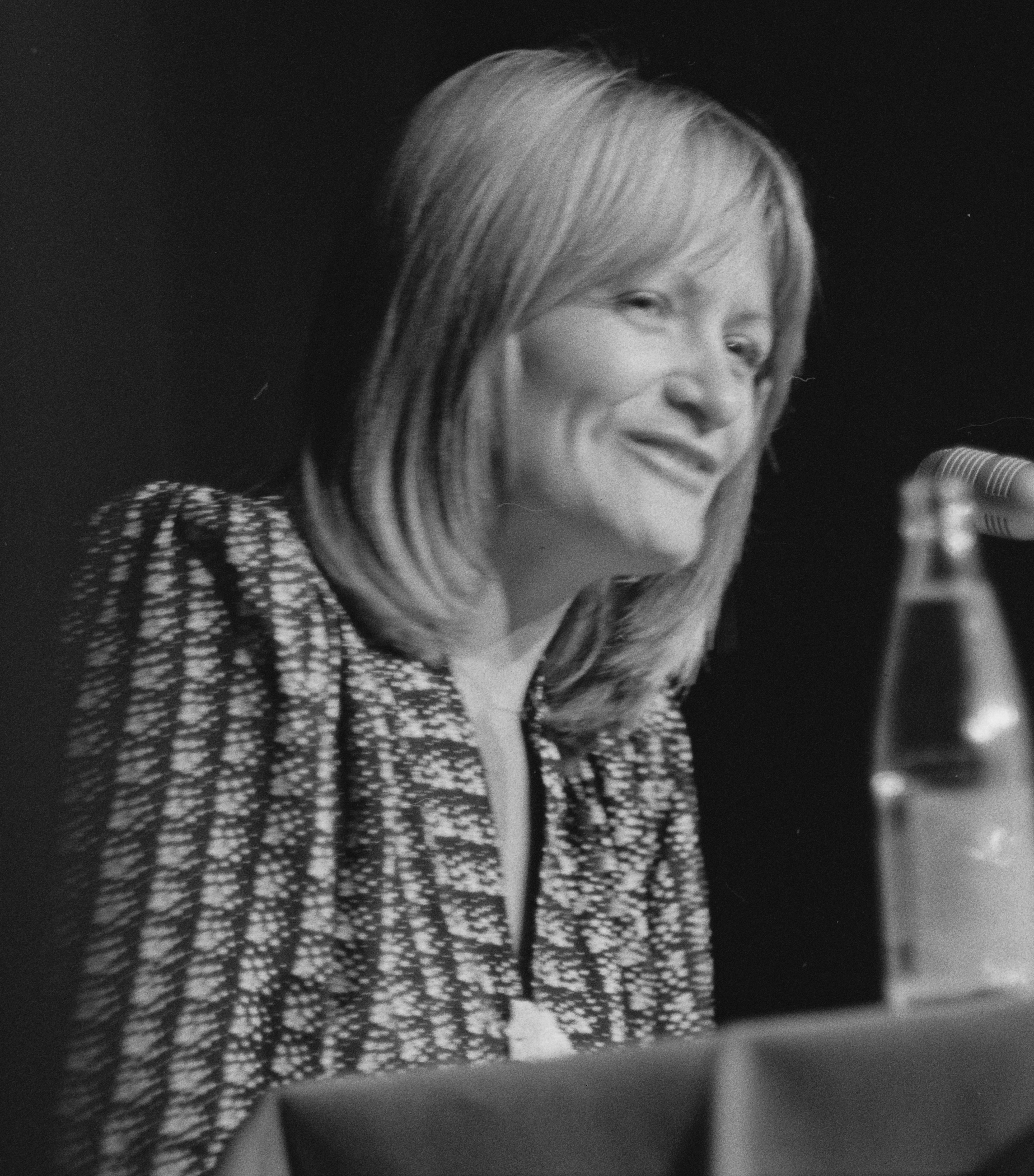
Schwarzer c. 1977

One of her goals was the realization of economic self-sufficiency for women. She argued against the law that required married women to obtain permission from their husbands before beginning paid work outside the home. This provision was removed in 1976.

In January 1977, the first issue of her magazine Emma was published, her focus of work as chief editor and publisher for the following years.

With her PorNo campaign, started in 1987, she advocated the banning of pornography in Germany, arguing that pornography violates the dignity of women, constitutes a form of media violence against them, and contributes to misogyny and physical violence against women. The ongoing campaign has not been met with much success.

From 1992 to 1993, Schwarzer was host of the TV show Zeil um Zehn on German TV channel Hessischer Rundfunk. With her frequent appearances in German TV talk shows, she has become an institution on German television in all matters related to feminism.

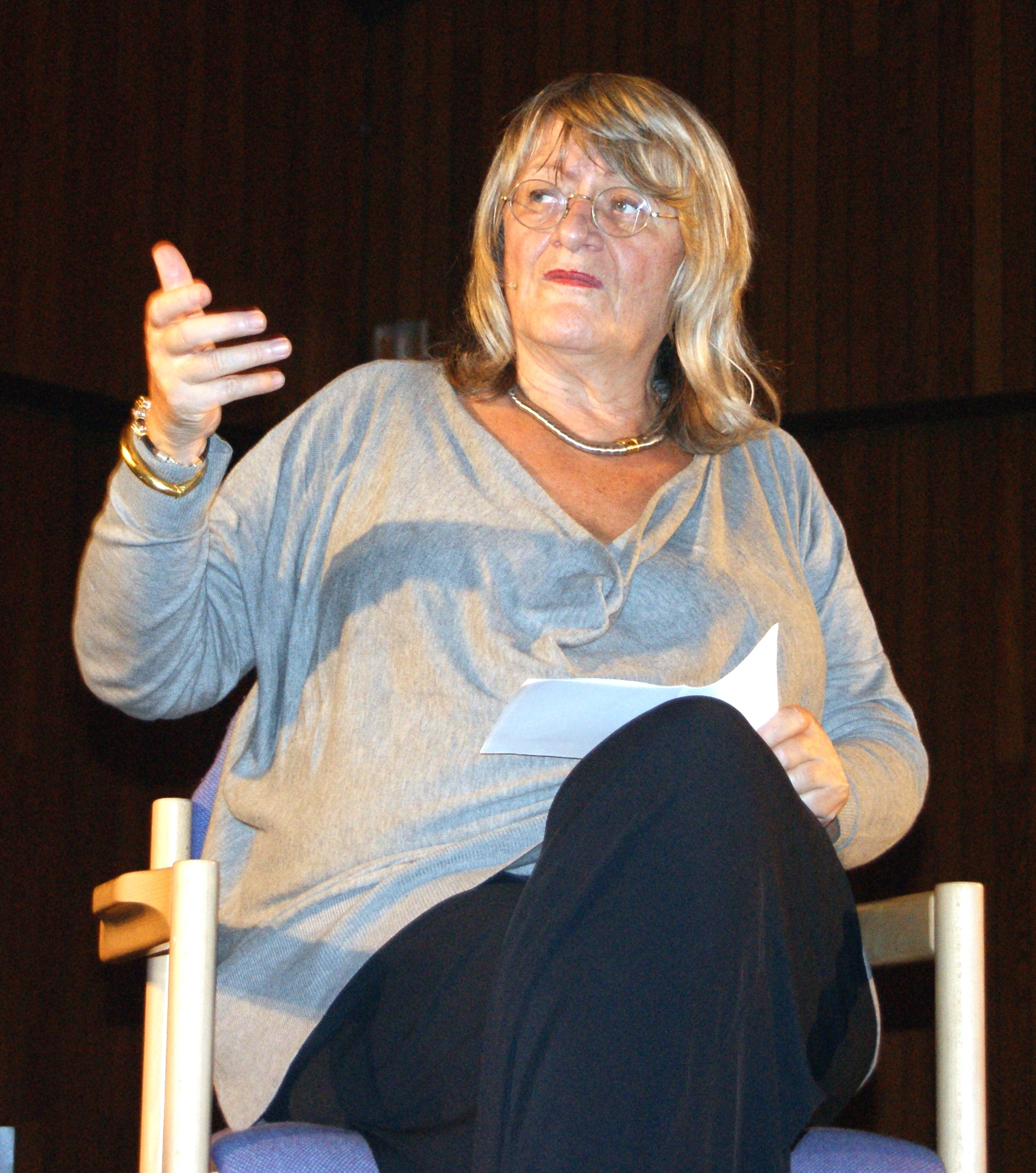
Schwarzer in 2010

When Emma changed to bimonthly release in 1993, she continued to write an increasing number of books, among them one about Petra Kelly and Gert Bastian, called Eine tödliche Liebe (Deadly Love), and biographies of Romy Schneider and Marion Dönhoff. In total, she has released 19 books as a writer, and 21 as publisher, as of 2014.

Regarding prostitution in Germany, she campaigned against the law of 2002 that fully legalized brothels. She views prostitution as violence against women, and favors laws like those in Sweden, where the sale of sexual acts is legal, but their purchase is not.

She published an autobiography, Lebenslauf (Curriculum vitae), in 2011.

She has been highly critical of political Islamism and the position of women in Islam; she favors prohibitions against women in public schools or other public settings wearing the hijab, which she considers a symbol of oppression. She is also a believer in the far-right Eurabia conspiracy theory, which posits that globalist entities, led by French and Arab powers, aim to Islamize and Arabize Europe.

She has written in favor of the continued legality of circumcision of male children.

In June 2018, Schwarzer married her long-time life and business partner Bettina Flitner.

Her most recent book, Transsexualität. Was ist eine Frau? Was ist ein Mann? Eine Streitschrift (2022), she claims that transgender people, which she calls "transgenderism", are a trend and advocates for retaining protections exclusively for cisgender women. For this, she has been criticised as transphobic. Furthermore, she claims that transgender people are homosexual people that do not want to be homosexual and promotes the rapid-onset gender dysphoria theory, which has been widely criticized for being scientifically unsupported.

She has also been called a TERF for these reasons.

In February 2023, she and Sahra Wagenknecht wrote the Manifest für Frieden (lit. 'Manifesto for peace'), a petition against the delivery of weapons to Ukraine.

In October 2026, Schwarzer announced that the 8 December 2026 edition of Emma will be the last one.

== Tax fraud ==
In the 1980s, Schwarzer set up an account at the Zürich-based private bank Lienhardt & Partner to keep her assets hidden from German tax authorities. During the following years, Schwarzer transferred earnings gained from book sales and public presentations to this Swiss bank account, thus avoiding taxation in Germany. Including interest and compound interest, her illegal assets piled up to an amount of 4 million euros.

According to Section 371 of the German tax code ("Abgabenordnung"), the perpetrator of a tax fraud may avoid punishment if he or she admits to the offence and provides full disclosure of unpaid taxes to the authorities (German: strafbefreiende Selbstanzeige). Schwarzer attempted to make such disclosure in secret to German tax authorities. However, in February 2014, the German newspaper Der Spiegel wrote an investigative article on the topic, turning the whole affair public.

As a reaction, Schwarzer made a statement on her private webpage on the matter. Under the heading "In eigener Sache" ("on one's own account"), Schwarzer admitted to being a tax fraudster. In that statement, Schwarzer tried to self-exculpate her crimes by claiming that in the past, she had been scared of political opponents in Germany and "was honestly afraid" that she might have to leave the country and thus needed to be financially prepared.

In May 2014, German tax authorities and criminal prosecutors raided a number of properties owned by Schwarzer. At the same time, judge-issued search warrants on several of Schwarzer's banking accounts were executed. It turned out that Schwarzer's initial voluntary disclosure submitted to German tax authorities was incorrect and she had in fact never admitted the whole amount of her unpaid taxes. In such cases, voluntary disclosures do not have any exculpatory effect under German tax law. Consequently, in July 2016, Schwarzer was fined for tax fraud with a penalty of a six-figure amount by the Amtsgericht (local court) of Cologne.

== Awards ==
- 1991: Von der Heydt-Kulturpreis of Wuppertal for her life achievements
- 1992: Dr. Kurt Neven DuMont Medaille of the Westdeutsche Akademie für Kommunikation
- 1996: Order of Merit of the Federal Republic of Germany am Bande (Cross of Merit on Ribbon)
- 1997: Schubart-Literaturpreis of Aalen
- 1997: Frau des Jahres 1997 of Verband Deutscher Staatsbürgerinnen
- 1999: Integration Prize of the Stiftung Apfelbaum
- 2003: Zivilcouragepreis des CSD Berlin
- 2004: Goldene Feder (honorary prize) of Bauer Verlagsgruppe
- 2004: Bambi Award for Wer wird Millionär? with Günther Jauch
- 2004: Knight of the Legion of Honour
- 2004: Danubius Prize for "her passionate fight for the rights of women"
- 2004: Staatspreis des Landes Nordrhein-Westfalen
- 2005: Officer's Cross of the Order of Merit of the Federal Republic of Germany
- 2005: Journalist of the Year by Medium-Magazin
- 2006: Ehrengabe of Heinrich-Heine-Gesellschaft
- 2007: Else Mayer Foundation Award
- 2008: Ludwig Börne Prize
- 2010: Mercator Professorship Award of the Universität Duisburg-Essen
- 2018: Markgräfler Gutedelpreis

== Alice Schwarzer Foundation ==
The Alice Schwarzer Foundation awards the Heroine Award to recognize women "who fight courageously and with dedication to improve the situation of women, whether through their professional work, social engagement or personal commitment".

Recent recipients of the award include:

- 2023: Iranian lawyer and women's activist Nasrin Sotoudeh
- 2024: Virginia Wangare Greiner, Kenyan-born social entrepreneur and advocate for African girls, women and families in Germany, and Cornelia Strunz, a German medical doctor and head of Dunkelziffer, an organization that campaigns against the sexual abuse of children and supports victims.

== Publications ==
- Frauen gegen den § 218. Suhrkamp Verlag, Frankfurt 1971.
- Frauenarbeit – Frauenbefreiung. Suhrkamp Verlag, Frankfurt 1973.
- Der kleine Unterschied und seine großen Folgen. Frauen über sich; Beginn einer Befreiung. Protokolle und Essays. S. Fischer, Frankfurt 1975, several editions
- So fing es an – 10 Jahre neue Frauenbewegung. Emma Frauenverlag, 1981.
- Mit Leidenschaft. Texte von 1968–1982. Rowohlt Verlag, Hamburg 1982.
- Simone de Beauvoir heute – Gespräche aus 10 Jahren. Interviews und Essays. Rowohlt Verlag, Hamburg 1982.
- Warum gerade sie? Weibliche Rebellen. Luchterhand Verlag, Frankfurt 1989
- Von Liebe + Haß. S. Fischer, Frankfurt 1992.
- Eine tödliche Liebe – Petra Kelly + Gert Bastian. Kiepenheuer & Witsch, Cologne 1994, ISBN 3-462-02288-1.
- Marion Dönhoff – Ein widerständiges Leben. Kiepenheuer & Witsch, Cologne 1996, ISBN 3-462-02531-7.
- So sehe ich das. Texte von 1992–1996. Kiepenheuer & Witsch, Cologne 1997.
- Romy Schneider – Mythos und Leben. Kiepenheuer & Witsch, Cologne 1998, ISBN 3-462-02740-9.
- Der große Unterschied. Gegen die Spaltung von Menschen in Männer und Frauen. Kiepenheuer & Witsch, Cologne 2002, ISBN 3-462-02934-7.
- Alice im Männerland. Eine Zwischenbilanz. Kiepenheuer & Witsch, Cologne 2002, ISBN 3-462-03143-0.
- Alice Schwarzer porträtiert Vorbilder und Idole. Kiepenheuer & Witsch, Cologne 2003, ISBN 3-462-03341-7.
- Frauen mit Visionen, with photographer Bettina Flitner, Knesebeck, Munich 2004
- Liebe Alice, liebe Barbara. Kiepenheuer & Witsch, Cologne 2005.
- Die Antwort. Kiepenheuer & Witsch, Cologne 2007, ISBN 978-3-462-03773-9.
- Simone de Beauvoir. Ein Lesebuch mit Bildern. Rowohlt, Reinbek 2007
- Simone de Beauvoir. Weggefährtinnen im Gespräch. Kiepenheuer & Witsch, Cologne 2007
- Journalistin aus Passion. Picus, Vienna 2010
- Lebenslauf. (autobiography). Kiepenheuer & Witsch, Cologne 2011, ISBN 978-3-462-04350-1.
- Reisen in Burma. with photographer Bettina Flitner, DuMont Verlag, Köln 2012, ISBN 978-3-8321-9424-6.
- Meine algerische Familie. Kiepenheuer & Witsch, Cologne 2018, ISBN 978-3-462-05120-9.
- Lebenswerk. Zweiter Teil der Autobiografie. Kiepenheuer & Witsch, Cologne 2020.

=== In English ===
- Schwarzer, Alice (1984). After the Second Sex. Pantheon. ISBN 0-394-72430-5.
- Schwarzer, Alice (1984). Simone de Beauvoir today: Conversations, 1972–1982. Hogarth Press. ISBN 0-7011-2784-8.
