= Stubbe – Von Fall zu Fall =

German crime television series

- Also known as: Von Fall zu Fall
- Genre: police procedural crime
- Starring: Wolfgang Stumph; Marie Gruber; Renate Krößner; Lutz Mackensy; Stephanie Stumph; Margret Homeyer
- Country of origin: Germany
- Original language: German
- No. of episodes: 39

Production
- Running time: 90 minutes

Original release
- Network: ZDF
- Release: 14 October 1995

Stubbe – Von Fall zu Fall (at the beginning only called Von Fall zu Fall and sometimes only called Stubbe) is a German crime detective television series starring Wolfgang Stumph as detective Stubbe. It is being broadcast on ZDF, the second German public television channel since 1995.

== Synopsis ==
Stubbe chronicles the life of Wilfried Stubbe (Wolfgang Stumph), a Hamburg police detective, in a both work- and family-related way. Stubbe lives with his daughter Christiane (Stephanie Stumph), his wife Caroline (Marie Gruber/Renate Krößner) — until the character's death in the episode "Auf Liebe und Tod" — and his aunt-in-law Charlotte (Margret Homeyer); the family moved to Hamburg from his hometown of Dresden at the beginning of the series. Together with his colleague Bernd Zimmermann (Lutz Mackensy), Stubbe has to solve a variety of criminal acts committed in all circles of the Hamburg society.

== Production ==
Stubbe is produced in Hamburg. The house in which Stubbe lives is located in the district of Moorfleet directly at the dike. Apart from Hamburg, other locations were used to film some sequences, for example Boizenburg and Dresden.

== Characters ==
- Wolfgang Stumph as Wilfried Stubbe - Stubbe is the main focus of the show. He is a quiet and professional detective with the Hamburg police with a sense of humor. Unlike his colleague, Zimmermann, Stubbe is more receptive to emotions who often trusts his gut. After his wife's death, he has a hard time trying to cope with the new role as a widower.
- Lutz Mackensy as Bernd Zimmermann - Zimmermann is Stubbe's counterpart and colleague. Unlike Stubbe, he prefers to deal with facts.
- Marie Gruber and Renate Krößner as Caroline Stubbe - Stubbe's wife and mother of Christiane. She works as a saleswoman in the beginning but then founded her own business. She dies due to an embolism after being hit by a car in the episode Auf Liebe und Tod.
- Stephanie Stumph as Christiane Stubbe - Christiane is Stubbe's daughter. After the death of her mother, she moves out and begins to study journalism.
- Margret Homeyer as Charlotte Hoyn - Charlotte is Caroline's aunt who goes on to live with Stubbe. She often has weird hobbies and her character serves as a running gag in the show.

== Reception ==
Stubbe is the most successful ZDF detective series, with 6-7 million viewers on average and 15-20% market share. The series has been praised for the way it displays a police inspector with real family troubles to handle. Wolfgang Stumph has received several awards for his portrayal of Stubbe, amongst them the Bayerischer Fernsehpreis in 2004.

Since the median age of the ZDF audience is 58, Stubbe has successfully been used to attract younger audiences with storylines that focus more on the problems of teenagers and almost half its audience is younger than 50.
