= Karl Valentin Order =

German award

The Karl Valentin Order was established by the Carnival club Munich Society Narrhalla e.V. on the occasion of its 80th anniversary. It was awarded for the first time in 1973. The Karl Valentin Order commemorates the legendary Bavarian humorist Karl Valentin (1882–1948). According to the foundation's protocol, the medal is awarded to a personality from art, politics, science, literature or sport for a humorous and profound comment or deed, for extraordinary work as an artist or to an outstanding figure in public life. The award ceremony takes place at the beginning of each year as part of the Narrhalla Soirée in the Deutsches Theater Munich.

== Recipients ==
- 1973: Werner Finck
- 1974: Vicco von Bülow (Loriot)
- 1975: Sigi Sommer
- 1976: Gert Fröbe
- 1977: Franz Josef Strauß
- 1978: Luis Trenker
- 1979: August Everding
- 1980: Bruno Kreisky
- 1981: Sir Peter Ustinov
- 1982: Hans-Dietrich Genscher
- 1983: Georg Lohmeier
- 1984: Helmut Kohl
- 1985: Ephraim Kishon
- 1986: Emil Steinberger
- 1987: Norbert Blüm
- 1988: Rudi Carrell
- 1989: Joseph Kardinal Ratzinger
- 1990: Aenne Burda
- 1991: Peter Weck
- 1992: Jürgen Möllemann
- 1993: Harald Juhnke
- 1994: Kurt Wilhelm
- 1995: Otto Schenk
- 1996: Edmund Stoiber
- 1997: Mario Adorf
- 1998: Senta Berger
- 1999: Christian Ude
- 2000: Roman Herzog
- 2001: Thomas Gottschalk
- 2002: Christiane Hörbiger
- 2003: Alfred Biolek
- 2004: Fritz Wepper
- 2005: Helmut Dietl
- 2006: Sir Peter Jonas
- 2007: Iris Berben
- 2008: Günther Beckstein
- 2009: Hape Kerkeling
- 2010: Maria Furtwängler
- 2011: Michael Herbig
- 2012: Vitali Klitschko and Wladimir Klitschko
- 2013: Til Schweiger
- 2014: Horst Seehofer
- 2015: Heino
- 2016: Miroslav Nemec and Udo Wachtveitl
- 2017: Dieter Reiter
- 2018: Philipp Lahm
- 2019: Andreas Gabalier
- 2020: Markus Söder
- 2021: Dieter Hallervorden
- 2023: Monika Gruber
- 2024: Volker Heißmann and Martin Rassau
- 2025: Günther Jauch
- 2026: Christoph Maria Herbst
