= Compañeros (film) =

1970 film directed by Sergio Corbucci

- Directed by: Sergio Corbucci
- Screenplay by: Dino Maiuri; Massimo De Rita; Günter Ebert; Sergio Corbucci
- Story by: Sergio Corbucci
- Produced by: Antonio Morelli
- Starring: Franco Nero; Tomas Milian; Jack Palance; Fernando Rey; Iris Berben
- Cinematography: Alejandro Ulloa
- Edited by: Eugenio Alabiso
- Music by: Ennio Morricone
- Production companies: Tritone Filmindustria Roma; Atlantida Films; Terra-Filmkunst
- Distributed by: Titanus (Italy); Atlántida Films (Spain)
- Release dates: December 18, 1970 (Italy); May 11, 1971 (West Germany); June 14, 1971 (Spain)
- Running time: 119 minutes
- Countries: Italy; Spain; West Germany
- Box office: ₤1.451 billion

Compañeros (Italian: Vamos a matar compañeros [sic], Spanish for 'Let's go killing, comrades!') is a 1970 Zapata Western film directed by Sergio Corbucci and starring Franco Nero, Tomas Milian, Jack Palance, Iris Berben and Fernando Rey. The film is about a Mexican revolutionary peasant (Milian) who joins forces with an arms dealer (Nero) to rescue a rebel leader.

== Plot ==
During the Mexican Revolution, a peasant nicknamed El Vasco starts a revolt in his town of San Bernardino by killing the army colonel in charge. Rebel leader and self-appointed General "Mongo" Álvarez soon arrives on the scene and hires El Vasco for his revolutionary gang. However, Mongo is more interested in gaining fortune for himself than for his country. Yodlaf Peterson, a Swedish mercenary arrives in Mexico to sell guns to General Mongo. The safe containing the money is locked and only Professor Xantos knows the combination. Xantos is the leader of a student rival revolutionary that opposes violence, and is held in a prison by the United States army just across the border in Yuma, after he tried to find funding from the US and did not agree to give the monopoly of his country's entire oil wealth in return.

El Vasco dislikes the suit-wearing Peterson and calls him a "penguin", but at the suggestion of General Mongo, the two reluctantly join forces and set out to capture Xantos. Their task is made harder by the American army and a wooden-armed American named John, who wants to exact revenge on Peterson, his former business partner. Peterson had left John to die after he was crucified, and his pet hawk had to peck his right hand off to save him. In order to maximize their personal gain and to support Xantos' rebel fighters, El Vasco and Peterson have to doublecross Mongo. They receive help from Lola, the leader of Xantos' rebel group, who El Vasco falls for, and her group of young revolutionaries.

After evading the Mexican army and crossing the border, Peterson makes contact with a local prostitute, named Zaira, whom he used to know who helps him and El Vasco infiltrate the US Army camp and together the two men free Xantos by setting off a series of fires, and escape with Xantos in an old army truck, but one of the truck's wheels becomes unhinged and the three men end up swimming across the Rio Grande river to safety back in Mexico. On foot, El Vasco, Peterson and Xantos encounter a Mexican army checkpoint and attempt to disguise themselves as robed monks carrying a coffin, with Xantos inside it, past the Mexican soldiers, but their cover is blown when John and his posse expose their identities forcing them to run with both the Mexican army and John's men in chase.

Eventually, El Vasco, Peterson and Xantos are safely reunited with Xantos' followers, known as the Xantistas, hiding out in a cave, led by Lola, Xantos' daughter. But Mongo captures several of the Xantistas and threatens to execute them if Xantos does not surrender. El Vasco and Peterson team up with Lola and the surviving Xantistas to launch a climactic attack on San Bernardino. They defeat Mongo's army in a gun battle, and Mongo himself is killed by El Vasco. Afterwards, when El Vasco brings Xantos to the bank vault to have him open the safe, the safe is revealed not to hold any gold, silver, or cash, only the "true wealth" of the community which includes a few ears of corn.

As Peterson prepares to leave town, John reappears and mortally wounds Xantos and prepares to kill El Vasco, only for Peterson to turn the tables on his enemy by blowing up the train car containing all of the arms and ammunition that Peterson arrived in, along with John. When news arrives that a large Federale counter-revolutionary army is marching onto San Bernardino, Peterson decides to leave aware that the Xantistas are outnumbered and outgunned, but El Vasco urges him to stay and fight. Peterson declines and rides away, but at the last minute, after seeing the huge Mexican army advancing in the distance and unwilling to allow the Xantistas be all killed by the Mexican army, Peterson rides back into town to join the revolutionaries in the imminent battle.

== Cast ==
- Franco Nero as Yodlaf "Penguin" Peterson
- Tomas Milian as Modesto Servando Irureta "El Vasco" Goyena
- Jack Palance as John
- Fernando Rey as Professor Vitaliano Xantos
- Iris Berben as Lola
- José Bódalo as General "Mongo" Álvarez
- Eduardo Fajardo as Colonel
- Karin Schubert as Zaira Harris
- Gino Pernice as Tourneur
- Gérard Tichy as Lieutenant
- Álvaro de Luna as John's Henchman
- Tito García as Pepito Tigrero
- Lorenzo Robledo as Captain Jim

== Release ==
Compañeros was released in Italy in December 1970. The film grossed a total of 1,451,782,000 Italian lire domestically in on its release in Italy. It was released in West Germany in 1971.

=== Home media ===
It was released by Blue Underground on Blu-ray in an edition that includes both the longer Italian 119 minute and the shorter 115 minute international English-language version.
