= Alfred Biolek =

German entertainer and television producer (1934–2021)

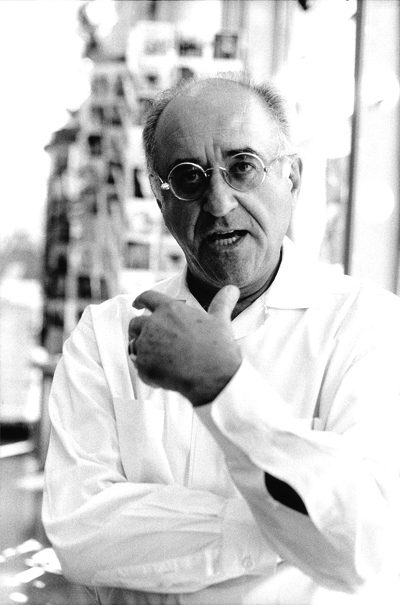
- Born: Alfred Franz Maria Biolek; 10 July 1934; Freistadt, Sudetenland, Czechoslovakia
- Died: 23 July 2021 (aged 87); Cologne, North Rhine-Westphalia, Germany
- Occupations: Entertainer; Television presenter; Television producer
- Known for: Bio's Bahnhof, Boulevard Bio, alfredissimo!
- Awards: Adolf-Grimme-Preis; Goldene Kamera; Karl Valentin Order; Order of Merit of the Federal Republic of Germany

Signature
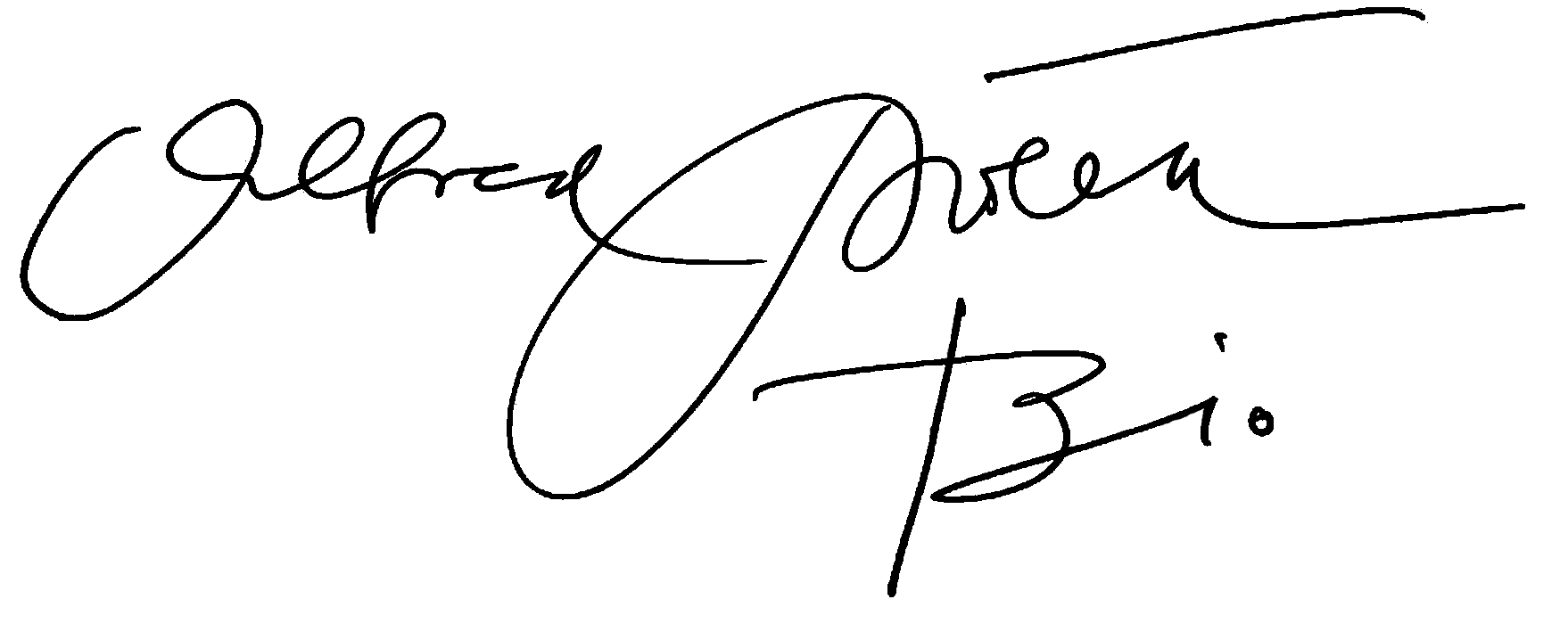

Alfred Franz Maria Biolek (10 July 1934 – 23 July 2021) was a German entertainer and television producer. Biolek held a PhD in law and was an honorary professor at the Academy of Media Arts Cologne. He received many awards for his work on television which included popular long-running series, and pioneering work for talk shows and cooking shows in the 1970s. He also received awards for his efforts for promoting the culture of food and wine. He supported and founded charities for Africa.

== Youth ==
Biolek was born in Freistadt (Fryštát) in Czechoslovakia (now Czech Republic), into a Sudeten German family. His father was a lawyer. After expulsion from Czechoslovakia in 1946, the Biolek family moved to Waiblingen near Stuttgart, where Biolek's father practiced law again. Biolek was raised a Catholic, and served as an altar boy. Later he temporarily joined the German conservative party CDU.

He attended the Gymnasium in Waiblingen and graduated in 1954. He then studied law in Freiburg im Breisgau, Munich, and Vienna. In 1958 he took a first state exam of law (third-best exam in Baden-Württemberg) and graduated with honors. In 1962 he achieved a doctorate, followed by a second state examination in law in 1963. In 1969 Biolek moved to Munich and worked for a larger law firm. Living in the city, Biolek underwent a radical change and distanced himself from his previous conservative mindset. He took part in the bohemian community in Munich, and belonged to filmmaker Rainer Werner Fassbinder's social circle.

== Television career ==
From 1963, Biolek worked as an assessor in the legal department of the new public German TV channel ZDF where he soon switched to editorial tasks. He became the anchor man of the TV show Drehscheibe. Bavaria Film was his employer until the early 1970s. In 1974, he developed for the broadcaster WDR in Cologne, together with Rudi Carrell, the show series Am laufenden Band. The successful Saturday night show became his breakthrough.

From 1975, he was presenter of a new talk show, with the journalist Dieter Thoma, Kölner Treff (Meeting in Cologne). In February 1978, he started his first produced and moderated show, titled Bio's Bahnhof (Bio's station), where e.g. Kate Bush had her television debut. In the 1980s, commercially less successful shows followed: Bei Bio, Show Bühne, and the game show Mensch Meier. Boulevard Bio ran from 1991 for 12 years, and alfredissimo! was last broadcast in 2007.

== Production company ==
While visiting the UK in the early 1970s, Biolek caught notice of the British comedy troupe Monty Python, and excited by their innovative, absurd sketches, he invited them over to Germany in 1971 and 1972 to write and act in two special German episodes of their show Monty Python's Flying Circus. The result, Monty Python's Fliegender Zirkus, was produced by Biolek in co-production with Westdeutscher Rundfunk.

With his own company Pro GmbH, Between 1991 and 2003, Biolek produced his weekly show Boulevard Bio. Biolek developed the art of sensitive conversation and attracted much attention. From 1994 to 2006, he also cooked with celebrities on his show alfredissimo!.

== Additional activities ==
Besides his media career, Biolek taught as an honorary professor at the Academy of Media Arts, Cologne from 1990 onwards.

He supported the intercultural work of the American Field Service Deutschland, with which he spent a year abroad in the US as one of the first German exchange students in the 1950s.

He was actively engaged in the struggle against AIDS and unwanted pregnancy in Africa. In 2000, he was appointed the first German UNFPA Goodwill Ambassador. In October 2005, Biolek founded the charity fund Alfred Biolek Stiftung – Hilfe für Afrika, to give African youngsters the opportunity of a better start in life. He was on the advisory board for the German Foundation for World Population.

As a patron of the arts, Biolek was committed to supporting cabaret. He was one of the patrons of the vaudeville theatre "Bar jeder Vernunft" in Wilmersdorf.

Since October 2006, Biolek was on tour with his program Mein Theater mit dem Fernsehen (My theatre/struggle with TV), in which he illustrated parts of his TV career.

== Personal life ==
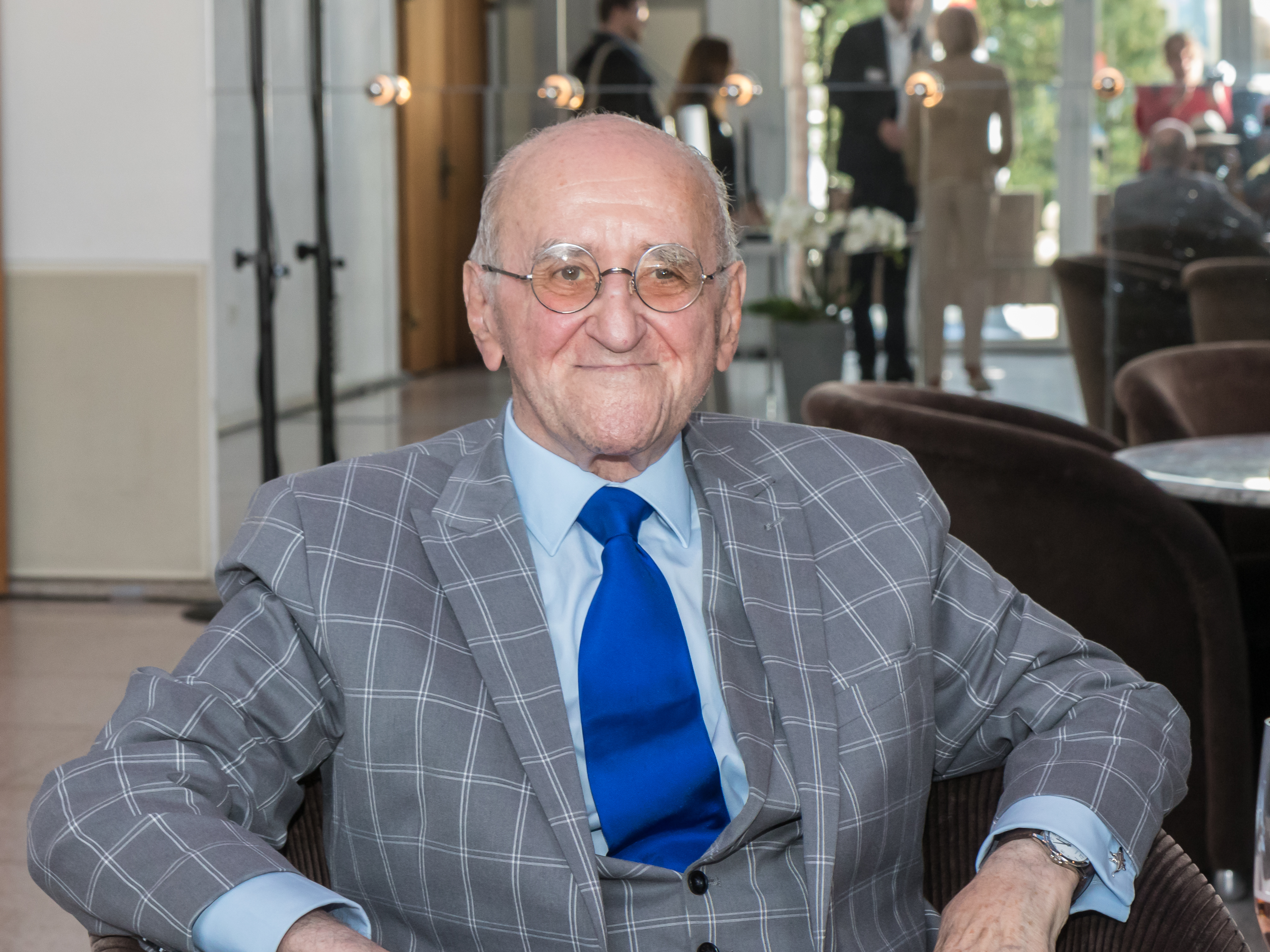
Biolek at a reception for his 85th birthday

On 10 December 1991, the director and activist Rosa von Praunheim outed Biolek, among other celebrities, as gay during a TV show. Biolek lived with his partner in Cologne and Berlin. In 2010, Biolek suffered brain injuries from a fall on a stair. Scott Ritchie took care of him, and he adopted him.

Biolek died on 23 July 2021 in Cologne, aged 87.

== TV shows ==
- 1971/1972 – producer of Monty Python's Fliegender Zirkus
- 1974 – producer of the Rudi Carrell show Am laufenden Band
- 1978 – first own show Bio's Bahnhof
- 1991 – talk show Boulevard Bio
- 1994 – cooking show with celebrities alfredissimo!

== Awards ==
- 1983 – Adolf-Grimme-Preis in Gold
- 1993 – Goldene Kamera for Boulevard Bio
- 1994 – Bambi
- 2000 – Bobby, media prize of the Bundesvereinigung Lebenshilfe for people with mental disabilities
- 2002 – German Book Prize (category non-fiction)
- 2002 – Deutscher Weinkulturpreis
- 2003 – Karl Valentin Order
- 2003 – Großes Bundesverdienstkreuz
- 2004 – Golden VDP Award "for his merits for the German wine"
- 2008 – Goldene Kamera for his life's work
- 2009 – Deutscher Fernsehpreis, Honorary award of the donors
