= Sketchup (TV series) =

- Genre: Comedy
- Starring: Diether Krebs; Iris Berben; Beatrice Richter
- Country of origin: West Germany
- Original language: German
- No. of series: 3
- No. of episodes: 35

Production
- Running time: 28 minutes
- Production company: Bayerischer Rundfunk

Original release
- Network: ARD
- Release: 24 September 1984 – 29 December 1986

Sketchup is a West German comedy television series which aired on ARD between 1984 and 1986. A sketch show, it enjoyed popular success at the time of its broadcast. A revival series was broadcast in 1997 with a new cast, but it did not recapture the success of the original.

== Main cast ==
- Diether Krebs
- Iris Berben
- Beatrice Richter

== Bibliography ==
Screen International: The international film & television directory, Volume 3. EMAP Media Information, 1993.
