= Go Trabi Go =

Go Trabi Go – Die Sachsen kommen
- VHS cover
- Directed by: Peter Timm
- Written by: Reinhard Kloss; Peter Timm
- Produced by: Reinhard Kloss
- Starring: Wolfgang Stumph; Claudia Schmutzler; Marie Gruber; Dieter Hildebrandt; Ottfried Fischer; Diether Krebs; Konstantin Wecker; Billie Zöckler; Barbara Valentin; André Eisermann; Monika Baumgartner
- Cinematography: Axel Block
- Edited by: Christel Suckow
- Music by: Ekki Stein
- Release date: 17 January 1991
- Running time: 92 minutes
- Country: Germany
- Language: German

Go Trabi Go is a 1991 German comedy and road movie directed by Peter Timm. It was the first major box office hit about events concerning the newly reunified Germany. Unlike other films in this period that focused on the problems following reunification, Go Trabi Go sees the main characters, former citizens of East Germany, explore places in Europe outside the Eastern Bloc that they were not allowed to visit during the Communist era.

== Synopsis ==
The year is 1990 and Germany has been newly reunified. German teacher Udo Struutz decides that his family should go on their first vacation in the "west" to relive Goethe's Italian Journey in their family Trabant 601 ("Trabi").

== Plot ==
Udo Struutz (Wolfgang Stumph), teacher in the East German town of Bitterfeld, Saxony-Anhalt, is a great fan of Goethe and wants to visit all places described in Goethe's Italian Journey. Following the German reunification in 1990, he sees the possibility to do so since it is now possible for him and his wife Rita (Marie Gruber) and daughter Jacqueline (Claudia Schmutzler) to travel to Italy. Driving in their family Trabant (called "Schorsch"), they set out to go on their first vacation in the "west".

Their first stop on their journey southwards is Regensburg where Struutz's brother-in-law (Ottfried Fischer) lives, who are portrayed as extreme opposites to the East German family. Following this short family reunion, the family with their Trabant is transported by a friendly truck driver to Italy where they continue on their own again. Arriving in Rome, the family's borrowed camera is stolen which prompts mother and daughter Struutz to chase after the thief, not only recovering their camera but also the money the thief stole. Not being able to talk to the police about it and not being able to find Udo again, they decide to check into a luxury hotel with the recovered money. Meanwhile, Udo sleeps in the car after driving through the city the whole day and is awakened by four young women who want to party with him, which leads to the Trabi driving down some stairs and casing being torn apart which they then replace with colorful spare parts. The family reunites at the Spanish Steps the next day and continues onto Naples where the Trabi loses its roof because the family forgot to secure it in place while trying to make a picture of themselves with Vesuvius in the background.

== Reception ==
Go Trabi Go was a major box office hit, attracting 1.5 million viewers in both parts of Germany, making it one of only three unification films that enjoyed success at the box office. This success has been described as being partly due to the love/hate relationship many East Germans had with their "Trabi", which was the most well-known and ridiculed symbol of East Germany.

Stephen Kinzer of The New York Times described the movie as a way for East Germans to laugh "not precisely at themselves, but at the absurdities of the system under which they lived until last year." He likens the Trabi as a symbol for the people who built it, who "survive[d] through difficult times and ultimately triumph[ed]". The film was also praised for its rollicking portrayal of the car as a main character while still getting across the problems of the "East" in the newly reunified country by using the car as a metaphor — slow, breaking down and ridiculed by the West.

The film was criticised for relying almost solely on crude clichés and mostly ignoring politically sensitive issues. Another reason for criticism was that the film paints the main characters in a humble, fair and nice way while their West German counterparts are depicted as vulgar, mean and shallow.

The film was followed by a sequel, Go Trabi Go 2: Das war der wilde Osten (1992).

== Soundtrack ==
The soundtrack album was released by Hansa.

1. "Westward Ho" - John Parr (4:38)
2. "Gates Of Eden" - Eena (4:38)
3. "Questa Notte" - Francesco Napoli (3:28)
4. "Trabi Goes To Napoli" (Instrumental) - Westlake Orchestra (4:20)
5. "Due Ragazze In Me" - Gianna Nannini (3:44)
6. "White Doves Have Crossed The Borders" - John Parr (3:47)
7. "Lady Of My Heart" - Taco (3:58)
8. "Keep On Running" - The Real Voices Of Milli Vanilli (4:08)
9. "Jacqueline's Song" - Claudia Schmutzler (3:02)
10. "Solo Con Te" - Eros Ramazzotti (5:01)
11. "Lover Boy" - Gabriela Di Rosa (3:35)
12. "Lady Of My Heart" (Hollywood String Version Instrumental) - Westlake Orchestra (3:58)

== Bibliography ==
- Clarke, David (July 2006). German Cinema: Since Unification. Continuum. ISBN 0-8264-9106-5.
- Naughton, Leonie (January 31, 2002). That Was the Wild East: Film Culture, Unification, and the "New" Germany. University of Michigan Press. ISBN 0-472-08888-2.
- Rodden, John (January 3, 2002). Repainting the Little Red Schoolhouse: A History of Eastern German Education, 1945-1995. Oxford University Press. ISBN 0-19-511244-X.
