= Der Dicke und der Belgier =

- Starring: Diether Krebs; Carry Goossens
- Country of origin: Germany

Der Dicke und der Belgier was a German comedy program aired on Sat.1 in 1998, featuring Flemish actor Carry Goossens as the lead Belgian character and Diether Krebs as the overweight lead character. The show, directed by Frank Strecker, consisted of twelve episodes in which the pair showcased their comedic abilities through various sketches. Many of these sketches were adapted from the Belgian comedy series Gaston and Leo.

This was the first German production featuring Carry Goossens, who had no previous knowledge of the German language. Goossens was invited to audition for the show by the Belgian-born producer and cameraman Roland Willaert.

Each episode of the show included about 24 sketches, in which the main actors portrayed a wide range of characters in everyday situations. They expertly played roles such as intoxicated police officers, gangsters, and tourists, among many others. Notable recurring sketches throughout the series included those by the Crusaders and No Free Beer for Schröder. Additionally, two special episodes aired, with the first lacking a specific title. The second special, titled 'Der Dicke und der Belgier feiern Silvester', aired just before the New Year's Eve of 1998-1999.

The complete season of the series was later released as a DVD box set on April 12, 2007.

== See also ==
- List of German television series
