= Zwei himmlische Töchter =

- Created by: Michael Pfleghar
- Starring: Ingrid Steeger; Iris Berben
- Country of origin: West Germany
- No. of seasons: 1
- No. of episodes: 6

Production
- Running time: 59 minutes

Original release
- Network: WDR

Zwei himmlische Töchter (English: Two Heavenly Daughters) is a West German television comedy series in six parts.

It features two strippers, played by Ingrid Steeger and Iris Berben, who inherited a 1930s-era Junkers Ju 52 cargo airplane (played by Swiss HB‑HOS). They have to fly a bull to Pamplona, the coffin of some Ivan Leech (Ferdy Mayne), former Western movies star Slim Nesbit (Eddie Constantine), a princess, an opera singer (Ivan Rebroff) or a whole troupe of Varieté dancers (Barbara Valentin, Elisabeth Volkmann).

== See also ==
- List of German television series
