= Stephanie Stumph =

German actress (born 1984)

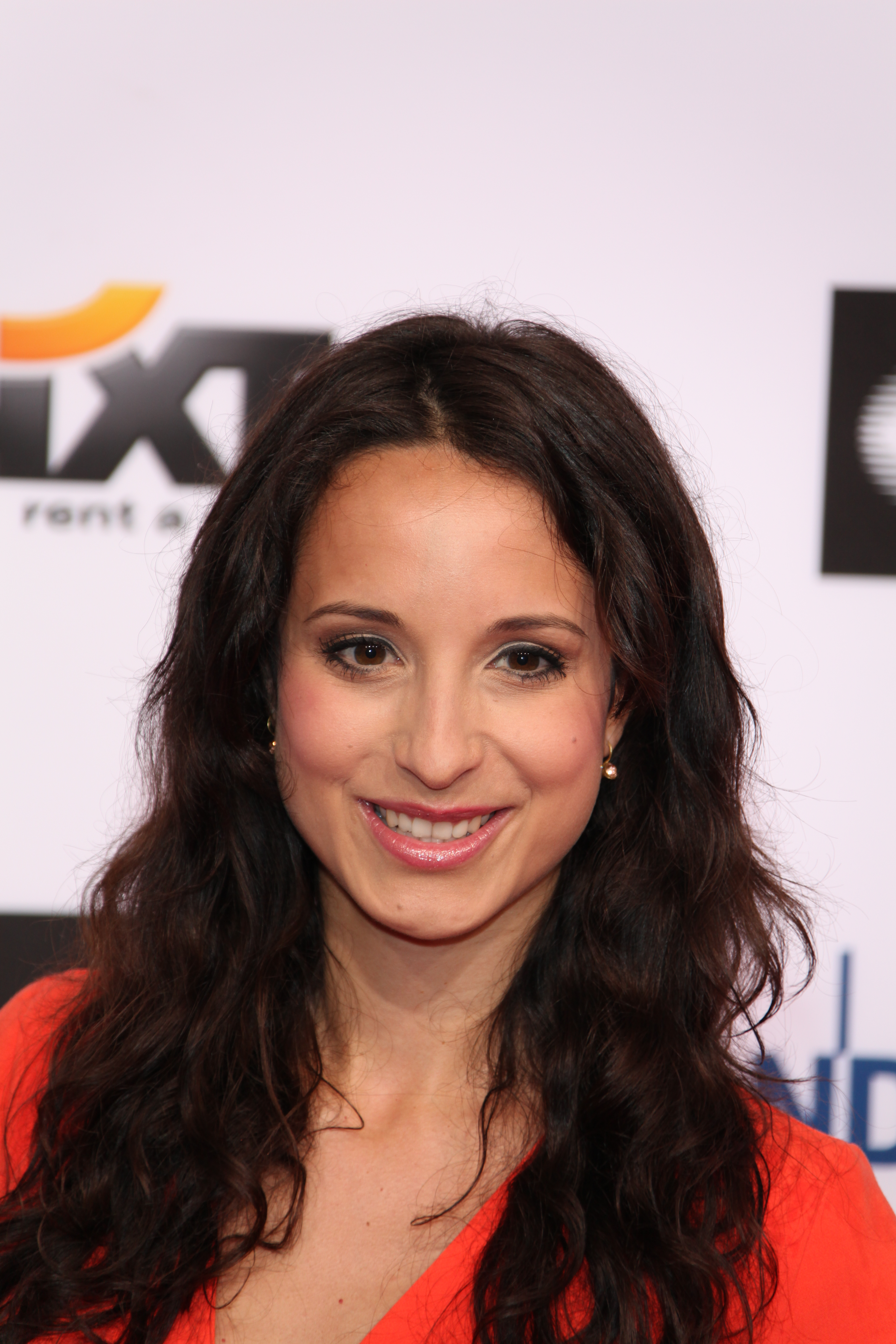
- Stephanie Stumph at the Studio Hamburg Newcomer Award, 2012.
- Born: July 7, 1984 (age 41); Dresden, East Germany
- Occupation: Actress
- Years active: 1995–present
- Website: http://www.stephaniestumph.de

Stephanie Stumph (born 7 July 1984 in Dresden) is a German actress. She is the daughter of actor Wolfgang Stumph.

== Personal life ==
Stumph was born as the daughter of Wolfgang and Christine Stumph on 7 July 1984. During her childhood, she sang in choirs and danced ballet. She subsequently took professional dancing classes, as well as piano and violin lessons. After completing Abitur in 2003, she studied at the Felix Mendelssohn College of Music and Theatre in Leipzig.

== Acting career ==
=== Television ===
Since 1995, Stumph has a role in the ZDF police investigation series Stubbe – Von Fall zu Fall playing Christiane Stubbe, the daughter of (her father) Wolfgang Stumph's character. In 2001, she played the daughter of Götz George's character in Liebe ist die halbe Miete and in 2003 and 2004 she starred alongside Katharina Thalbach, Katja Riemann and her father in the two-part film Der Job seines Lebens. In 2005 she starred in the Rosamunde Pilcher film adaptation The Shell Seekers. In 2008 she starred alongside her father in 30 Tage Angst, a hostage thriller. In 2009, she had a major role in the ARD film Väter werden ist nicht schwer alongside Fritz Wepper and Francis Fulton-Smith. Also in 2009, the ZDF produced Stumph's first own series called Die Bergwacht.

=== Theater ===
Before studying, Stumph had her first theater role in 2000–2001 playing Carmencita in the play Das Haus in Montevideo at the Kleine Komödie in Dresden. During her studies she was with the Staatsschauspiel Dresden which she currently has a guest contract with.

== Television ==
- Leipzig Homicide (2006)
- SOKO Wismar (2007)
- Der Alte (2015)

== Theater ==
- Der gute Mensch von Sezuan (Staatsschauspiel Dresden): Shen Te / Shui Ta / Mrs. Yang / Wife of the carpet salesman (2006–2007)
