= Wolfgang Stumph =

German actor and cabaret artist

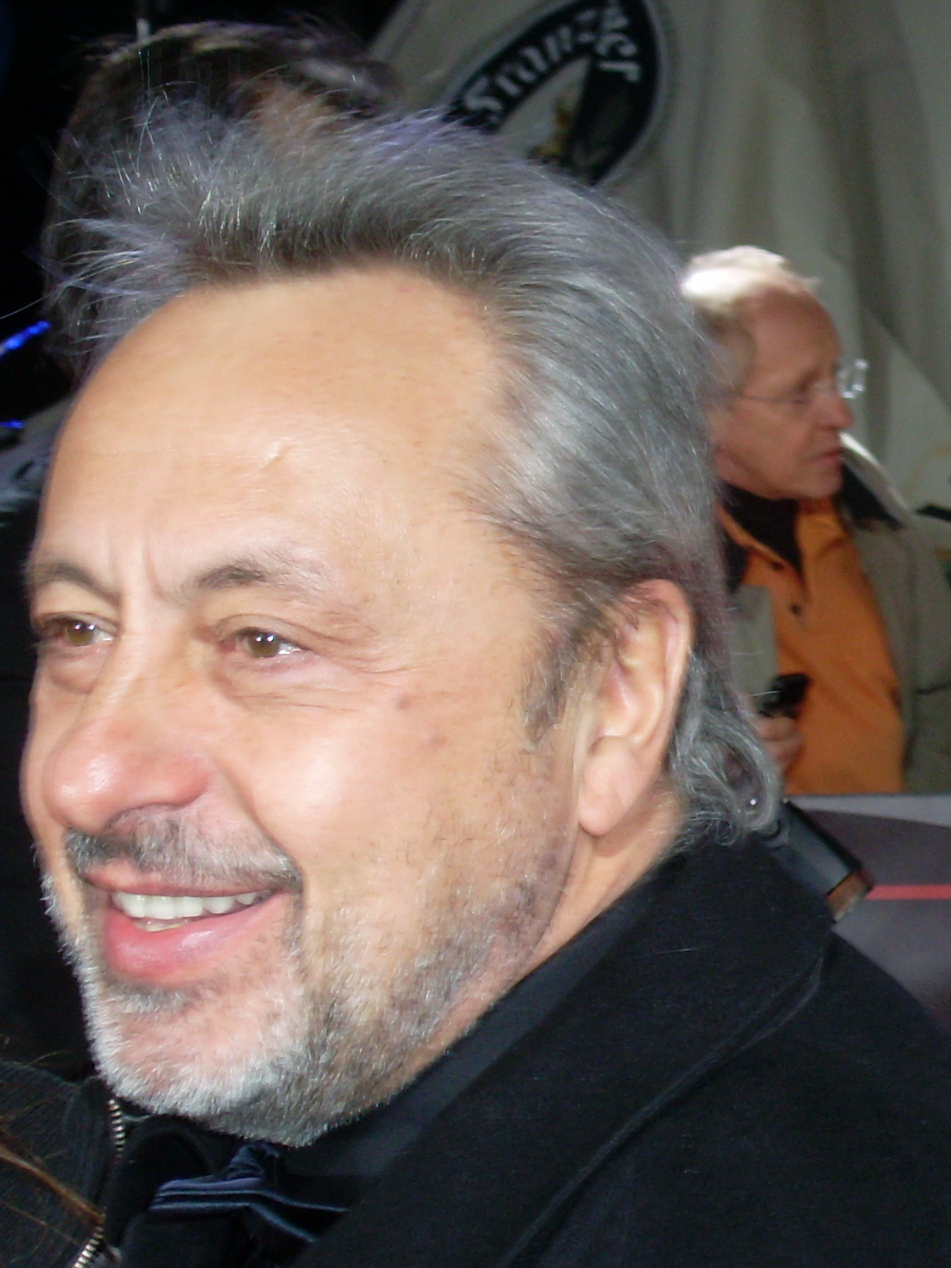
- Stumph at Diva 2008
- Born: 31 January 1946 (age 80); Wünschelburg (Radków, Poland)
- Years active: 1991-today
- Spouse: Christine Stumph (1973-)
- Website: http://www.wolfgang-stumph.de

Wolfgang Stumph (born 31 January 1946) is a German actor and cabaret artist.

== Early life ==
Stumph was born in Wünschelburg, Lower Silesia (Poland) in 1946 to German parents. He was expelled from his hometown and grew up without a father in Dresden in the German Democratic Republic. After school he trained to become a heavy plate boiler maker and later studied engineering and psychology in Dresden, graduating from university as "Engineer-Pedagogue". After his studies, he completed a public actor's training and started his professional career as a political cabaret artist in Dresden's "Herkuleskeule" club.

== Success ==
Stumph achieved his breakthrough as an actor shortly after the German reunification with the 1991 comedic film Go Trabi Go. In the film he plays a teacher from former East Germany who wants to take his family to Italy for their first holiday, driving there in the family's Trabant (a car affectionately called "Trabi"). Go Trabi Go was a major hit in the time shortly after the reunification of Germany and drew crowds in both parts of Germany; critics said the film was a way for East Germans to "laugh not precisely at themselves, but at the absurdities of the system under which they lived until last year".

After the film, which was followed by a sequel in 1992, Stumph began his first step to a later extensive cooperation with the ZDF, the second German public TV channel. From 1993 to 1996 he starred on the ZDF produced sitcom Salto Postale as Wolle Stankoweit, a postal worker in the fictional town Niederbörnicke in Brandenburg. Salto Postale was one of the few successful German sitcoms of that time and both the sitcom and Stumph won multiple awards. From 1998 to 2001 he starred in the same role in a sequel sitcom called Salto Kommunale.

Since 1995, Stumph stars in a more serious role as detective Stubbe in the ZDF police investigation series Stubbe – Von Fall zu Fall. His daughter Stephanie Stumph has a recurring role as Stubbe's daughter. Von Fall zu Fall is one of the most successful shows in Germany and consistently receives high ratings. He also starred in multiple other films, both of comedic and serious nature.

== Cabaret ==
In 1991, Stumph founded the comedy troupe "Anthrak auf Stumphsinn" with Gunter Antrak und Detlev Rothe with which he toured the country with different shows, each consisting of comedy about the former East Germany.

== Filmography ==
=== Films ===
- Go Trabi Go (1991)
- Go Trabi Go 2 – Das war der wilde Osten (1992)
- Ein Fall für TKKG: Drachenauge (1992)
- Theaterdonner (TV) (1995)
- Bis zum Horizont und weiter (To the Horizon and Beyond) (1998)
- Ein Stück vom Glück (TV) (2001)
- Ein Sack voll Geld (TV) (2002)
- Heimatfilm! (2002)
- Oskar der Klomann (TV) (2003)
- Der Job seines Lebens (TV) (2003)
- Derrick – Die Pflicht ruft (voice) (2004)
- Der Job seines Lebens 2 (TV) (2004)
- Das Schwalbennest (TV) (2004)
- Das Blaue Wunder (TV) (2004)
- Dresden (2006)
- Eine Liebe in Königsberg (TV) (2006)
- Beim nächsten Kind wird alles anders (TV) (2006)
- Heimweh nach Drüben (TV) (2007)
- Keinohrhasen (2007)
- Im Meer der Lügen (TV) (2008)
- Stürmische Zeiten (TV) (2008)
- 30 Tage Angst (TV) (2008)
- Salami Aleikum (2009)
- Romeo und Jutta (TV) (2009)
- Stankowski's Millions (TV) (2011)
- 100 Things (2018)

=== Television series ===
- Salto Postale (24 episodes) (1993–1996)
- Stubbe – Von Fall zu Fall (1995-)
- Die Geliebte (1998)
- Salto Kommunale (26 episodes) (1998–2001)
- Salto Speziale (3 episodes)

== Awards ==
- Telestar for Salto Postale (1995)
- Goldene Henne Superillu (1996)
- Premio Bacco (1999)
- Goldene Henne Superillu (1999)
- Goldene Henne Superillu (2003)
- Krimi des Jahres for Stubbe: Tod des Models (2004)
- Bayerischer Fernsehpreis for Stubbe – Von Fall zu Fall (2004)
- Münchhausen-Preis of the city of Bodenwerder (2004)
- Till-Eulenspiegel-Satirepreis of the city of Bremen (2005)
- Signs of Fame Germany (2006)
- Goldene Henne Superillu (2009)
