= We've had abortions! =

German magazine Stern 1971 cover declaration by 374 women

6 June 1971 cover of Stern

Wir haben abgetrieben! ("We've had abortions!") was the headline on the cover of the West German magazine Stern on 6 June 1971. 374 women, some, but not all, of whom had a high public profile, publicly stated that they had had pregnancies terminated, which at that time was illegal.

The action was triggered by the feminist (and founder, some years later, of the feminist magazine EMMA) Alice Schwarzer; it targeted Paragraph 218 of the country's penal code (Strafgesetzbuch). It is viewed by many as a milestone in the feminist revival of the 1970s.

In addition to the eye-catching headline, the magazine cover incorporated pictures of 28 of the better known participants. These included the journalist Carola Stern and the actresses Senta Berger, Veruschka von Lehndorff, Ursula Noack, Romy Schneider, Sabine Sinjen, Vera Tschechowa, Lis Verhoeven, Hanne Wieder, and Helga Anders. The event caused a particular sensation in West Germany, because it broke the silence on public discussion of abortion. It was followed by the founding of several feminist groups, and it provided a focus for opposition to Paragraph 218 of the penal code until 1992, when the legal position changed following German reunification.

== History ==
=== Background ===
The example for the campaign came from a similar action two months earlier, "The manifesto of 343 sluts" ("Le manifeste des 343 salopes"), which had involved 343 French women signing up to an equivalent declaration in the Paris-based Nouvel Observateur of 5 April 1971. French intellectuals and media stars who had supported the "manifesto" included Simone de Beauvoir, Catherine Deneuve, Jeanne Moreau, Marguerite Duras, Françoise Sagan, Ariane Mnouchkine, and Agnès Varda.

The initiator of the campaign in France was an editor at the Le Nouvel Observateur called Jean Moreau. A few weeks later, he contacted Alice Schwarzer because he was concerned by rumours that a German news magazine was about to pick up on the French campaign, and that Nouvel Observateur's actions in France might become part of a massive uncontrollable media campaign in West Germany. Schwarzer already knew the Stern editor Winfried Maaß, and she came to an agreement with him to initiate the action in Stern as long as she could mobilize between 300 and 400 women to sign up to a public declaration.

During the next few months, Schwarzer won over 374 women. Her initial approach was to the Frankfurt-based "Aktionsrat zur Befreiung der Frau" ("Council for Women's Liberation"), but they turned her down, rejecting the action proposed as excessively middle class (literally, "kleinbürgerlich" und "reformistisch"). Schwarzer had a better result with the Berlin-based "Socialist Women's Association" ("Sozialistische Frauenbund"), which in the end produced more than half of the 374 participants. The rest were recruited through word of mouth.

=== Aftermath ===
The French campaign had its result in 1975 when the Health and Families Minister Simone Veil succeeded, in the face of sustained resistance from various quarters, in pushing through a comprehensive abortion reform law. The legal position remains more nuanced in Germany, where a qualified liberalization measure followed in 1976, but it was only in 1992 that the need to harmonize the legal position inherited from the previously separate Western and Eastern Germanys led to further relaxation of the relevant statutory restrictions.

Some years after it appeared in Stern, it emerged that not all of the 374 women profiled had actually undergone abortions themselves. Alice Schwarzer was one of those who had falsely signed up; but she robustly rejected press suggestions that the entire campaign had been based on a bluff:

"That completely misses the point. Each of us would have done it if we had had an unwanted pregnancy. That 'confession' was not a moral action, but a political one."

Forty years on, the Franco-German television channel Arte screened a film entitled Wir haben abgetrieben - Das Ende des Schweigens ("We've had abortions - An end to the silence"), produced in collaboration with Norddeutscher Rundfunk. The film offered a retrospective review of the campaign, and of subsequent developments.
