= Salto Postale =

German television series

- Starring: Wolfgang Stumph
- Country of origin: Germany

Salto Postale is a German sitcom television series.

== See also ==
- List of German television series
