= Two Girls from the Red Star =

1966 film

- Directed by: Sammy Drechsel
- Written by: Klaus Peter Schreiner
- Based on: Two Girls from the Red Star by Peter Norden
- Produced by: Heinz Pollak; Gero Wecker
- Starring: Lilli Palmer; Curd Jürgens; Pascale Petit
- Cinematography: Werner M. Lenz
- Edited by: Hélène Plemiannikov
- Music by: Caravelli
- Production companies: Chronos Films; Team-Film
- Distributed by: Nora Film
- Release date: 25 February 1966
- Running time: 94 minutes
- Countries: Austria; France; West Germany
- Language: German

Two Girls from the Red Star (German: Zwei Girls vom rotten Stern) is a 1966 comedy spy film directed by Sammy Drechsel and starring Lilli Palmer, Curd Jürgens and Pascale Petit. It was based on a novel by Peter Norden.

It was shot at the Sievering Studios in Vienna with sets designed by the art director Hertha Hareiter. A co-production between Austria, France and West Germany, it is also known by the alternative title An Affair of States.

== Synopsis ==
Two female members of the Soviet military are selected to attend a disarmament conference held in Geneva, in order to steal the details of a secret new American weapon.

== Main cast ==
- Lilli Palmer as Olga Nikolaijewna
- Curd Jürgens as Dave O'Connor
- Pascale Petit as Anja Petrovna
- Daniel Gélin as Ballard
- Kurt Meisel as Sapparov
- Stanislav Ledinek as Popovitch
- Hellmut Lange as Harry Miller
- Anthony Steel as Michael 'Mike' Astor
- Edd Stavjanik as Koltchev

== Bibliography ==
- Goble, Alan. The Complete Index to Literary Sources in Film. Walter de Gruyter, 1999.
- Parish, James Robert & Pitts, Michael R.. The Great Spy Pictures: Volume II. Bloomsbury Academic, 1986.
- Von Dassanowsky, Robert. Austrian Cinema: A History. McFarland, 2005.
