= Sammy Drechsel =

German political comedian, journalist and sports reporter

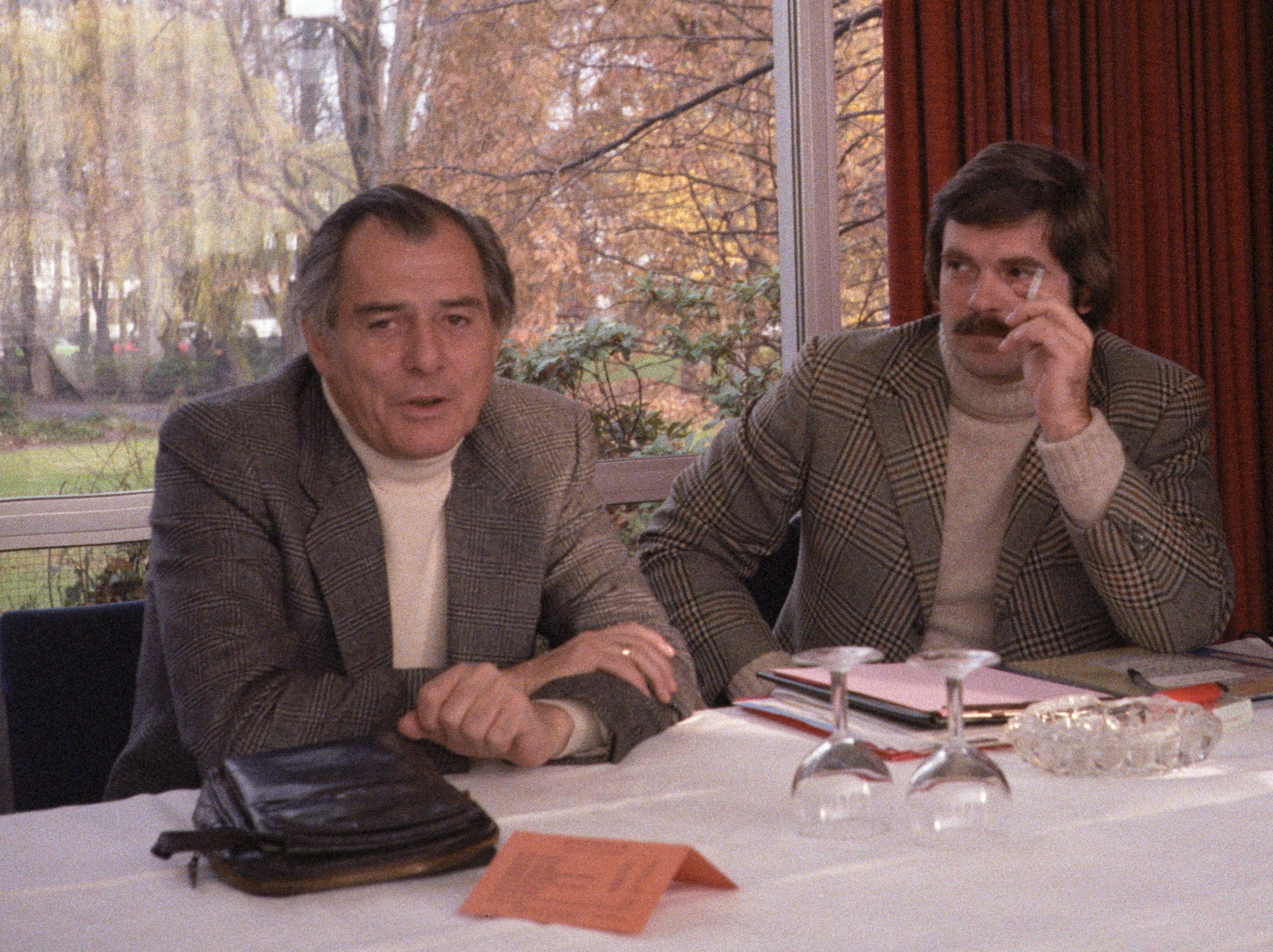
Sammy Drechsel (left) and Manfred Bloedorn

Sammy Drechsel (25 April 1925, in Berlin – 19 January 1986, in Munich), born Karl-Heinz Kamke, was a German political comedian, journalist and sports reporter. In 1956, together with Dieter Hildebrandt, he founded the Münchner Lach- und Schießgesellschaft, one of Germany's most successful and influential sites of political kabarett, for which he was producer and director up to his death. From 1950 to his death he also worked as a sports reporter for the Bavarian "Bayrischer Rundfunk". He also became well known for his 1955 book "Elf Freunde müsst ihr sein" ("You Ought to be Eleven Friends"), which targeted an adolescent audience. (The book has also become available as an audiobook, narrated by his long-time friend Hildebrandt.) One of Drechsel's last appearances was in the German TV series Kir Royal, directed by Helmut Dietl, which was completed shortly before his death.

From 1962 to 1986, Drechsel was married to Irene Koss.
