= Klaus Havenstein =

German actor, cabaret artist, dubbing artist and television presenter (1922–1998)

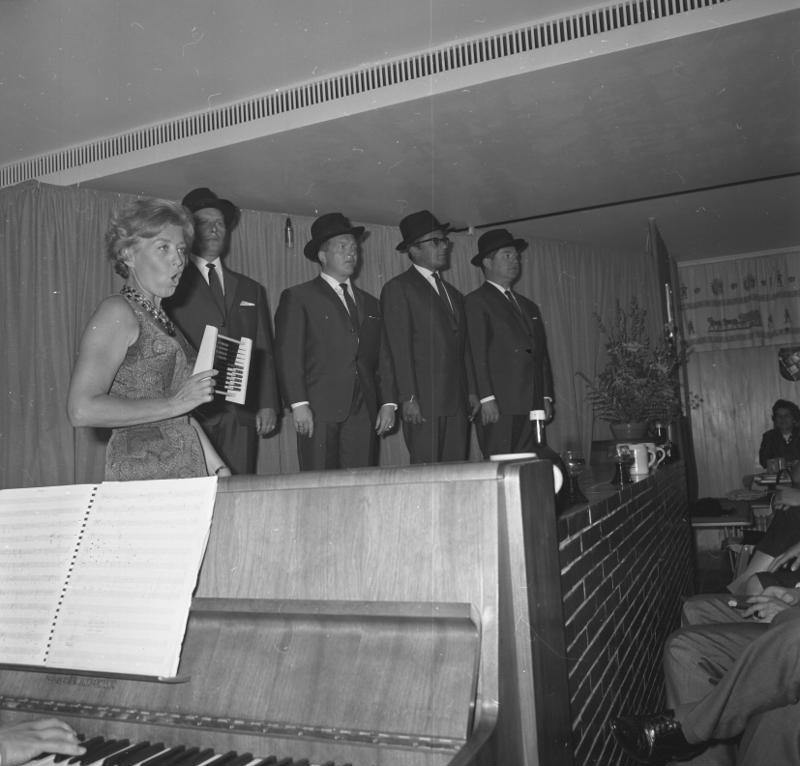
- Havenstein (far right) during a 1964 performance by the Münchner Lach- und Schießgesellschaft
- Born: 7 April 1922; Wittenberge, Weimar Republic
- Died: 19 March 1998 (aged 75); Munich, Germany
- Occupations: Actor; voice artist; comedian; cabaret artist; television presenter
- Years active: 1951–1998
- Spouse: Marina Havenstein (m. 1958)
- Children: 2

Klaus Havenstein (7 April 1922 – 19 March 1998) was a German actor, cabaret artist, dubbing artist and television presenter.

== Biography ==
Klaus Havenstein grew up in Hamburg, where he started an apprenticeship as a retail salesman in 1937. At the same time, against his father's wishes, he took acting lessons from a private teacher.

In 1939 Havenstein served in the 1st SS Division Leibstandarte SS Adolf Hitler where he joined the artillery. He took part in the Battle of France, in the occupation of Greece and in the war against Soviet Union.

In 1945 he was captured and was held by the U.S. Army as a prisoner of war. The Americans recognised his talent and brought him to a special camp in Garmisch-Partenkirchen to entertain imprisoned officers. There, he was discovered as a theatre actor, and it was in the Garmisch theatre that he first appeared on stage, promoted by the famous German actor Hans Söhnker among others.

In the 1950s and 1960s Havenstein was known all over Germany. Along with Ursula Herking, Dieter Hildebrandt and Oliver Hassencamp, the cabaret artist created a form of sharp-tongued, provocative entertainment of a kind never seen before. In 1956 he was among the founders of the ensemble Münchner Lach- und Schießgesellschaft, literally "Munich laughter and shooting club" - a mixed-up version of Wach- und Schließgesellschaft ("security company"). In 1972 Havenstein left the group but remained active on television and radio.

Havenstein married in 1958; his wife's name was Marina.

In 1968 Havenstein played the voice of King Louie in the dubbed German version of the Walt Disney film The Jungle Book, and Fagin in the dub of Oliver and Company. He dubbed all the spoken and sung parts. Other voices he dubbed included those of Michel Galabru (Le Gendarme de St. Tropez), Gene Wilder (Frankenstein Junior, the German version of Young Frankenstein), Jack Lemmon (Mister Roberts), Alberto Sordi (Vitelloni) and Peter Ustinov.

Havenstein also presented popular children's television programmes such as "Sport-Spiel-Spannung" ("sports, games, fun") and "Zwei aus einer Klasse" ("two from one school class"). He acted in films and began to work with the Bavarian broadcasting company Bayerischer Rundfunk. This work lasted a long time: he made around 3,000 programmes over 46 years. One of the highlights of this work was his co-production of the children's series "Jeremias Schrumpelhut", in which he spoke all 50 roles himself. In 1996 he stopped working as a radio presenter to make way for younger blood.

From 1990 to 1992 Havenstein directed the festival in Bad Vilbel.

Later, he took on guest roles in various television programmes such as Rudis Tagesshow with Rudi Carrell, where he entertained the crowd along with Diether Krebs and Beatrice Richter.

Klaus Havenstein died in the spring of 1998 of a heart attack and was buried in the Nordfriedhof cemetery in Munich.

== Selected filmography ==
- Storm in a Water Glass (1960), as Dressel
- Snow White and the Seven Jugglers (1962)
- Two Girls from the Red Star (1966)
- Something for Everyone (1970), as Rudolph
- Der Kommissar: Die Kusine (1975, TV), as Hanns Deichsel
- Crazy Jungle Adventure (1982), as Wilhelm Buerli

== See also ==
- German television comedy

== Sources ==
Much of this article was translated from the German version of February 2007.
