= Lienhardt & Partner Privatbank Zürich =

Swiss bank

- Native name: Lienhardt & Partner Privatbank Zürich AG
- Industry: Financial services
- Founded: 1868
- Headquarters: Rämistrasse 23, CH-8024 Zürich, Switzerland
- Key people: Dr. Duri Prader (CEO)
- Number of employees: about 60
- Website: www.lienhardt.ch

Lienhardt & Partner Privatbank Zürich (until 2001 Gewerbebank Zürich) is a traditional Swiss universal bank founded in 1868 and based in Zürich. Its core activities include private banking, financing and real estate.

== History ==
This Zürich based commercial bank was founded in 1868 as the Vorschuss- und Kreditverein der Handwerker des Bezirkes Zürich (Advance and Loan Association of the Craftsmen of the District of Zürich). In 1914 it was transformed to a stock corporation by a cooperative. For decades it remained a regional bank anchored in Zürich with a focus on the tradesmen and small and medium enterprises.

In 1994 the bank joined the newly founded RBA-Holding, the joint organization of Swiss regional banks. Its activities were retail banking with the savings and mortgage business, but also specialized in private banking and real estate management.

In 2001 Franz Lienhardt, owner of the subsidiary Linco AG, specialized in the administration and mediation of real estate, took over the majority of shares of the Gewerbebank Zürich. The remaining shares are spread over around 500 shareholders. The bank was renamed to Lienhardt & Partner Privatbank Zürich AG, which is used in the regional banking network.
