= Iris Berben =

German actress (born 1950)

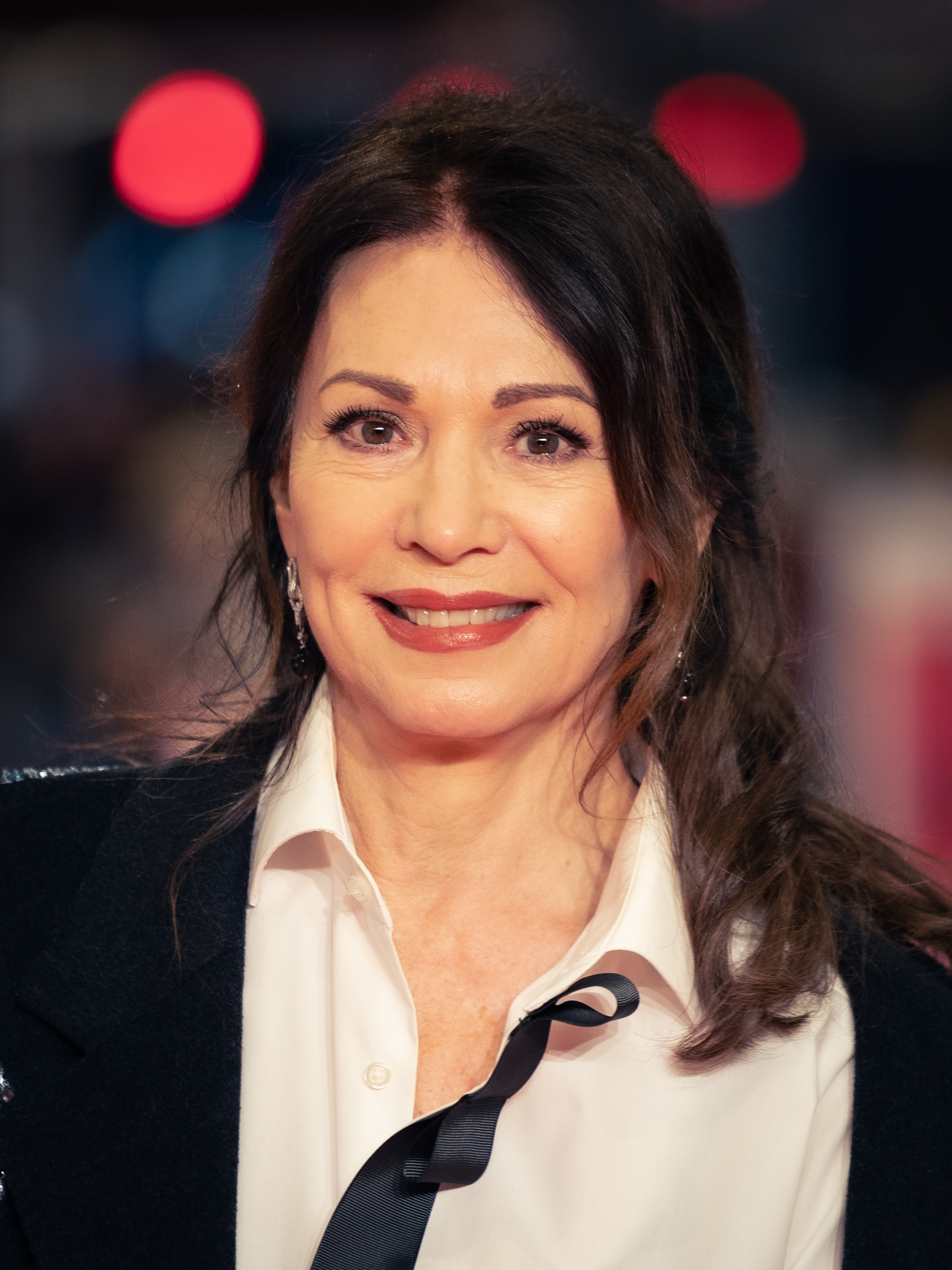
- Berben in 2025
- Born: Iris Renate Dorothea Berben; 12 August 1950 (age 76); Detmold, West Germany
- Occupation: Actress
- Years active: 1968–present
- Partners: Gabriel Lewy (1974–2006); Heiko Kiesow (2007–present)
- Website: irisberben.de

Iris Renate Dorothea Berben (pronounced [ˈiːʁɪs ˈbɛʁbm̩], born 12 August 1950) is a German actress.

== Biography ==
Berben was born in Detmold, North Rhine-Westphalia. She grew up in Hamburg, where her parents ran a restaurant.

Berben has appeared in about 150 film and television productions since 1969. Berben has played leading roles in a large number of German television productions, including the 1970s sitcom Zwei himmlische Töchter and the 1980s comedy show Sketchup with Diether Krebs. One of her best-known roles is the title character, a no-nonsense police commissioner, in the long-running crime series Rosa Roth between 1994 and 2013. Her film roles include Sergio Corbucci's Western Compañeros (1970) with Franco Nero, the adaptation of Thomas Mann's Die Buddenbrooks (2008), and the barmaid Petra in the sport comedy Eddie the Eagle (2016).

After the Six-Day War in 1967, she traveled to Israel, and afterwards became the partner of the Israeli singer Abi Ofarim. Since then, she has been a supporter of Israel and has also repeatedly campaigned against antisemitism. She had a son, Oliver, in 1971, but never revealed the identity of the father.

In 2010, together with Bruno Ganz, Berben was elected president of the German Film Academy. She served as an SPD delegate to the Federal Convention for the purpose of electing the President of Germany in 2017.

== Filmography ==
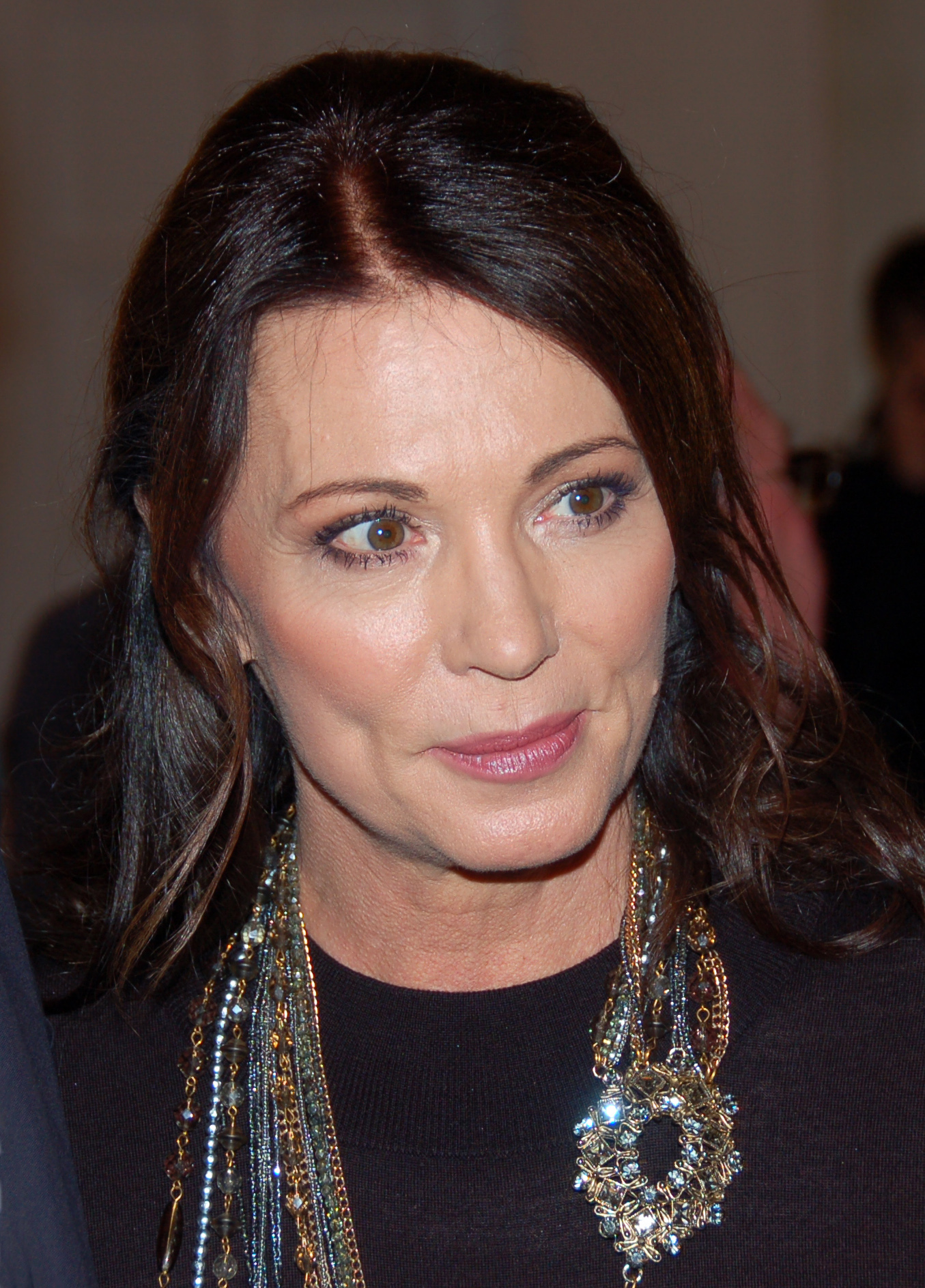
Berben in 2010

- Detectives (1969)
- The Man with the Glass Eye (1969)
- The Arsonists (1969)
- Jill in the Box (1970)
- Compañeros (1970)
- Supergirl (1971)
- Ulla oder Die Flucht in die schwarzen Wälder (1974, TV film)
- Mademoiselle de Scuderi (1976, TV film)
- Tea for Three (1976)
- Derrick – Series 4, Episode 3: "Eine Nacht im Oktober" (1977, TV)
- Zwei himmlische Töchter (1978, TV series)
- Derrick – Series 5, Episode 6: "Klavierkonzert" (1978, TV)
- Ach du lieber Harry (1980)
- Joyride (1983)
- Angelo und Luzy (1984, TV series)
- Knock on the Wrong Door (1984)
- Siggi, the Street Cleaner (1984)
- Rallye Paris – Dakar (1984)
- Beinahe Trinidad (1985)
- Sketchup (1985–1986, TV-series)
- Rückfahrt in den Tod (1986, TV-film)
- Das Erbe der Guldenburgs (1986–1990, TV-series)
- A Touch of Danger (1988, TV-film)
- Three D (1988)
- Karambolage (1989, TV film)
- Das Geheimnis des gelben Geparden (1990, TV film)
- The second Life (1990, TV film)
- Saint Peter's Snow (1991, TV-film)
- The Frog Prince (1991)
- Cosimas Lexikon (1992)
- Das große Fest (1992, TV film)
- Dornberger (1992, TV-film)
- Rochade (1992, TV film)
- A Man for my Wife (1993, TV-film)
- Sommerliebe (1994, TV film)
- Death in Miami (1994, TV-film)
- Rudy, the Racing-Pig (1995)
- Rosa Roth (1994–2013, TV-series, 31 episodes)
- Peanuts – The Bank pays Everything (1996)
- Code Red (1997, TV-film)
- Andrea and Marie (1998, TV-film)
- Ultimate Trespass (1998, TV-film)
- Mrs. Rettich, Czerni, and I (1998)
- Am I beautiful? (1998)
- Das Miststück (1998, TV-film)
- Die Zauberfrau (1999, TV-film)
- Ein mörderischer Plan (2000, TV film)
- The Beast (2000, TV-film)
- One Hell of a Night (2001, TV-film)
- Wer liebt, hat Recht (2001, TV film)
- 666 – Traue keinem, mit dem du schläfst! (2001)
- Beloved Sister (2002, TV-film)
- Die schöne Braut in Schwarz (2002, TV-film)
- Schöne Witwen küssen besser (2004, TV-film)
- Die Patriarchin (2005, TV miniseries)
- Das Kommando (2005, TV-film)
- Silver Wedding (2006, TV-film)
- Cold Summer (2006, TV-film)
- Afrika, mon amour (2007, TV-miniseries)
- Suddenly Gina (2007, TV-film)
- Duel at Night (2007, TV-film)
- The Sibyl Cipher (2008, TV-film)
- Die Buddenbrooks (2008)
- Krupp: A Family Between War and Peace (2009, TV-miniseries)
- The Day will come (2009)
- Kennedy's Brain (2010, TV-film)
- Tiger Team: The Mountain of the 1000 Dragons (2010)
- Years of Love (2011, TV-film)
- The Pursuit of Unhappiness (2012)
- The Wagner-Clan (2013, TV-film)
- Miss Sixty (2014)
- The Witness-House (2014, TV-film)
- Traumfrauen (2015)
- Eddie the Eagle (2015)
- Family! (2016, TV-film)
- Crossroads (2018, TV-film)
- How about Adolf? (2018)
- Family-Affairs (2022)
- Triangle of Sadness (2022)
- The Interpreter of Silence (2023)
- Paradise (2023)

== Audiobooks (excerpt) ==
- 2005: Françoise Sagan, Bonjour Tristesse. Publisher: Random House Audio Köln, ISBN 978-3-89830-972-1.
- 2006: Minka Pradelski, Und da kam Frau Kugelmann. Publisher: Random House Audio Köln, ISBN 978-3-86604-185-1.
- 2007: Anna Gmeyner, Manja. Publisher: Hörkultur, ISBN 978-3-9523087-4-5.
- 2010: Petra Hammesfahr, Die Mutter. Publisher: Random House Audio Köln, gekürzt 4 CDs 296 Min., ISBN 978-3-8371-0442-4
- 2011: Marina Lewycka, Kurze Geschichte des Traktors auf Ukrainisch. Publisher: Random House Audio Köln, ISBN 978-3-8371-0875-0.
- 2011: Iris Berben liest Verbrannte Bücher – Verfemte Komponisten. Publisher: Verlag Herder, ISBN 978-3-451-31978-5.
- 2015: Brüder Grimm (Brothers Grimm), Brüderchen und Schwesterchen. Publisher: Amor Verlag, ISBN 978-3-944063-72-0.
- 2015: Brüder Grimm (Brothers Grimm), Frau Holle. Publisher: Amor Verlag, ISBN 978-3-944063-71-3.
- 2016: Hans Christian Andersen, Die kleine Meerjungfrau (The Little Mermaid). Publisher: Amor Verlag, ISBN 978-3-944063-95-9.
- 2017: David Walliams, Zombie-Zahnarzt, publisher: Argon Verlag, ISBN 978-3-8398-4122-8.
- 2021: Petra Hammesfahr, Der stille Herr Genardy, publisher: Lübbe Audio, ISBN 978-3-7540-0054-0 (Audiobook-Download)

== Awards ==
- Bundesverdienstkreuz 1997
- Goldene Europa GALA-Sonderpreis 2000
- Scopus Award 2001
- Officer's Cross of the Order of Merit of the Federal Republic of Germany 2003
- Women's World Award – World Tolerance Award 2004
- Bayerischer Verdienstorden 2005
- Karl Valentin Order 2007
- Platinum Romy Award 2018
- Golden Eye Award, Zurich Film Festival 2020
- Schiller Prize of the City of Marbach 2023

== Honoring in modern art ==
Honoring Handprint of Iris Berben. Blauer Salon Gallery of Fame at the cinema theater Lichtburg Essen. City of Essen, Nordrhein Westfalen, FRG.
