= Marie Gruber =

German actress (1955–2018)

- Born: 11 June 1955; Wuppertal, West Germany
- Died: 8 February 2018 (aged 62); Berlin, Germany
- Occupation: Actress
- Years active: 1980–2017

Marie Gruber (11 June 1955 in Wuppertal, North Rhine-Westphalia – 8 February 2018) was a German actress. She appeared in more than one hundred films since 1980.

== Selected filmography ==
Year	Title	Role	Notes
1981	Bürgschaft für ein Jahr		
1991	Go Trabi Go		
1994	Back to Square One		
2006	The Lives of Others		
2008	The Reader		
2008	Jerichow		
2010	Three		
2014	Beauty and the Beast	Adèle	
2016	Frantz		
