= Diether Krebs =

German actor (1947–2000)

- Born: 11 August 1947; Essen, Allied-occupied Germany
- Died: 4 January 2000 (aged 52); Hamburg, Germany
- Occupations: Actor, Kabarett artist and comedian
- Known for: Hosting the comedy show Sketchup from 1984 until 1986

Diether Krebs (11 August 1947 – 4 January 2000) was a German actor, cabaret artist and comedian.

== Life and career ==
=== Youth and initial success ===
Diether Krebs was born on 11 August 1947 in Essen, the son of a stationery shop owner. His godfather was Diether Posser, a lawyer, SPD politician and erstwhile Minister for Justice and Finance for North Rhine-Westphalia. Krebs gained his first experience in the theatre at school at the Humboldt Gymnasium in Essen. He took acting lessons at the renowned "Folkwangschule" school of performing arts in the Ruhrgebiet and took on his first role at the theatre in Oberhausen, followed by some small film roles. Of these, his most noteworthy appearance was in the film Zoff (1971) in which he played alongside well-known actors such as Jürgen Prochnow and Claus Theo Gärtner.

From 1973, Krebs became famous for his role as "Michael Graf" in the legendary comedy series Ein Herz und eine Seele, the German version of Till Death Us Do Part. Krebs played the same character as Tony Booth's Mike, the left-wing son-in-law of Alfred Tetzlaff (Alf Garnett), played by Heinz Schubert. In 1974, however, he left the series due to differences with the producers WDR.

In the time that followed, Krebs made many television appearances, both in light entertainment and in more sophisticated series. In 1975, Peter Zadek chose him to play in Eiszeit with Heinz Bennent; in 1980 he played a main role in Die Judenbuche based on the story by Annette von Droste-Hülshoff.

=== Detective thrillers ===
In 1978, Krebs turned to crime series: for eight years, from 1978 to 1986, he played "Dieter Herrle", the miserable chief detective in the series SOKO 5113. He made several guest appearances in the well known detective series Tatort, as well as in the famous Polizeiruf 110 and Der Alte.

=== Comedian and cabaret artist ===
Krebs achieved more success as a cabaret artist and comedian: in 1981, he made regular appearances on Rudis Tagesshow with Rudi Carrell, alongside Beatrice Richter and Klaus Havenstein. This poked fun at the main news programme, the Tagesschau, and caused a good deal of uproar. Krebs left his series, again because of disagreements with the producer (ARD).

From 1985 to 1987 Krebs achieved cult status with his comedy series Sketchup in which he took on a wide range of different characters, accompanied at first by Beatrice Richter and then by Iris Berben. The series also became popular in other countries, such as Belgium. This series, followed by Knastmusik (1990) and Lauter nette Nachbarn (also 1990) built up Krebs's reputation as a comedian.

=== Actor, singer and presenter ===
In the years that followed, Diether Krebs acted in roles of varying quality. In 1986 he played the hairdresser "Hupsi" in Helmut Dietl's successful series Kir Royal; in 1992 he took on a role in the catastrophe film Moebius by Matti Geschonneck. In 1991 he acted as a long-distance driver in the comedy Go Trabi Go by Peter Timm. That same year, he entered the German music charts: for a while he became famous as "Martin", a naive tree-hugger in a hand-knitted Fair Isle jumper with straggly hair and prominent teeth. He also played this character on stage.

Krebs also worked as a television presenter, for example hosting the New Year Gala on MDR from 1996 and the Goldene Henne media award ceremony in 1999, also on MDR.

=== Hard times and a comeback ===
The last years of Diether Krebs's life were marked by his dwindling success and serious illness. In 1993, the RTL show R.O.S.T. – Die Diether Krebs-Show, which also starred Hugo Egon Balder, was cancelled after thirteen episodes. The Sat.1 comedy series Der Dicke und der Belgier with the Flemish comedian Carry Goossens was also cancelled in 1998 due to low viewing figures.

Krebs was a strong smoker and by then he was suffering from lung cancer. Nonetheless, at this time, he developed a new character which he played on stage: "Herr Krups", a funny sales rep with horn-rimmed glasses and wonky teeth. In 1998 he set off on a tour, starting in Berlin, with a routine including his own version of the Ruhrgebiet's ode to Currywurst. The text of this song which Herbert Grönemeyer made famous was written by Krebs.

=== His last role ===
In 1999, Diether Krebs played his last role in the Ruhrgebiet-based action comedy film Bang Boom Bang. Playing slimeball shipping agent Werner Kampmann he appeared alongside Ralf Richter and others in this film directed by Peter Thorwarth. Some film critics acclaimed this as Krebs's best ever part. Krebs was also scheduled to act in the longer cinema version of the film but died 8 months prior from lung cancer.

== Selected filmography ==
- Die tollkühnen Penner (1970)
- Zoff (1971), as Brother
- Ein Herz und eine Seele (1973–1974, TV series), as Michael Graf
- Eiszeit (1974), as Chief physician
- SOKO 5113 (1978–1986, TV series, 60 episodes), as Diether Herle
- Tatort – Himmelfahrt (1978, TV), as Lossak
- Tatort – Alles umsonst (1979, TV), as Kommissar Nagel
- Es begann bei Tiffany (1979, TV film), as Charly
- Silas (1981, TV miniseries), as Philipp
- Sketchup (1984–1986, TV series) as Various roles
- Beule (1988, TV film), as Heinz Borbet
- Go Trabi Go (1990), as Trucker
- Moebius (1992), as Wuttke
- Bang Boom Bang (1999), as Werner Kampmann

== Sources ==
Large parts of this article were translated from the German version as of October 30, 2006

== See also ==
- German television comedy
- Cabaret
