= Katja Woywood =

German actress

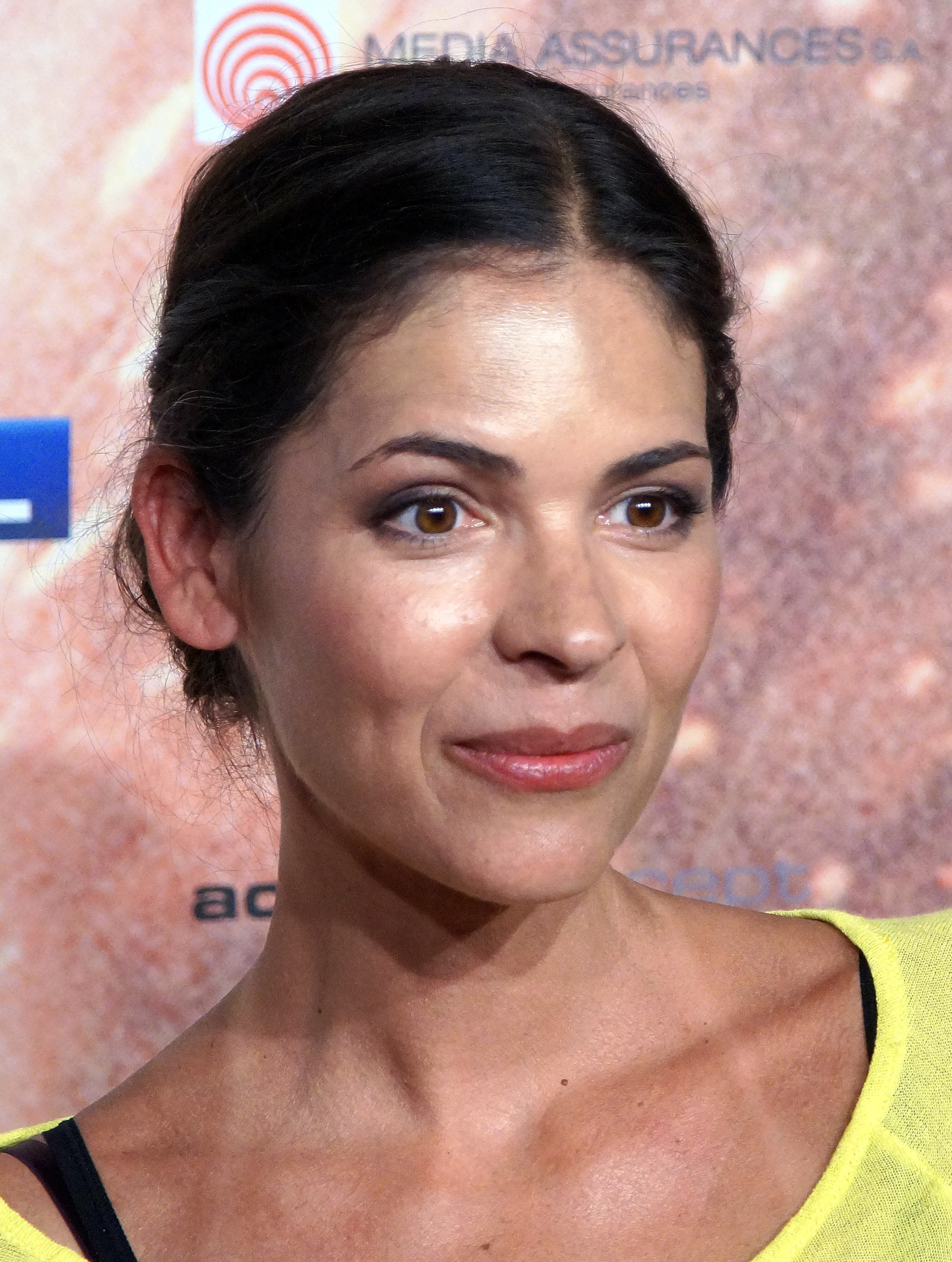
- Woywood in 2016
- Born: 10 May 1971 (age 55); West Berlin, West Germany (now Berlin, Germany)
- Occupation: Actress
- Years active: 1985–present
- Spouse: Marco Girnth (m. 1998)
- Children: 1

Katja Woywood (born 10 May 1971) is a German actress and former child star in her native land. She started playing in movies and series as a 15 year old girl. Her hobbies are drawing and roller skating. Since episode 189 she plays the new chief of the highway police in the German action-series Alarm für Cobra 11 – Die Autobahnpolizei.

== Personal life ==
She married actor Marco Girnth in August 1998. They have one child named Niklas.

== Filmography ==
- 1985: Ich knüpfte manche zarte Bande
- 1987: Der Schatz im Niemandsland
- 1988: Fest im Sattel
- 1989: The Black Forest Clinic
- 1989: Hessische Geschichten
- 1989: Hotel Paradies
- 1990: Pension Corona
- 1991–1998: Tatort
- 1991: Weißblaue Geschichten
- 1991: Altes Herz wird nochmal jung
- 1992–2000: Das Traumschiff
- 1992: Ein Heim für Tiere
- 1992: Der Fotograf oder Das Auge Gottes
- 1992: Glückliche Reise
- 1993: Happy Holiday
- 1993: Schuld war nur der Bossa Nova
- 1993: Großstadtrevier
- 1993: Soccer Love
- 1994: Der Nelkenkönig
- 1994: Die Stadtindianer
- 1994: Die Weltings vom Hauptbahnhof – Scheidung auf Kölsch
- 1994: Um jeden Preis
- 1995–1999: Der Landarzt
- 1995: Ein unvergeßliches Wochenende
- 1995: Mordslust
- 1995: Inseln unter dem Wind
- 1996: Gegen den Wind
- 1996: Die Drei
- 1996: Der König
- 1996: SK-Babies
- 1996: Wolkenstein
- 1996: Die Geliebte
- 1996: Die Männer vom K3
- 1997–2005: The Old Fox
- 1997: Derrick
- 1998: SOKO München
- 1998: Gehetzt – Der Tod im Sucher
- 1998: Feuerläufer – Der Fluch des Vulkan
- 1998: Die Wache
- 1998: HeliCops – Einsatz über Berlin
- 1999–2008: Siska
- 1999: Fatal Online Affair
- 1999: Schwarz greift ein
- 1999: Rivalinnen der Liebe
- 2000: Geisterjäger John Sinclair
- 2000: Flashback
- 2000: Contaminated Man
- 2001: Drehkreuz Airport
- 2001: Rosamunde Pilcher: Blumen im Regen
- 2002–2006: Leipzig Homicide
- 2002–2007: Küstenwache
- 2002: Sehnsucht nach Sandin
- 2003: Traumprinz in Farbe
- 2003: Das Glück ihres Lebens
- 2003: Alarm für Cobra 11 – Einsatz für Team 2
- 2003: Utta Danella
- 2004: Inga Lindström – Die Farm am Mälarsee
- 2005: Die Schwarzwaldklinik – Die nächste Generation
- 2005: Pfarrer Braun
- 2006–2008: SOKO Kitzbühel
- 2006–2009: Die Rosenheim-Cops
- 2006: Das Traumhotel
- 2007: Ein Fall für zwei
- 2007: War ich gut?
- 2007: Beim nächsten Tanz wird alles anders
- 2007: Das Wunder der Liebe
- 2008–2010: Kreuzfahrt ins Glück
- 2008: Zoogeflüster – Komm mir nicht ins Gehege!
- 2009–2019: Alarm für Cobra 11 – Die Autobahnpolizei
- 2009: Kommissar LaBréa - Tod an der Bastille
- 2009: In aller Freundschaft
- 2010: Der Bergdoktor
- 2011: Toni Costa: Kommissar auf Ibiza - Der rote Regen
- 2012: Toni Costa - Kommissar auf Ibiza - Küchenkunst
- 2013: IK 1 - Touristen in Gefahr
- 2013: Kripo Holstein - Mord und Meer
- 2015: Josephine Klick - Allein unter Cops
- 2016: Die Truckerin
- 2017: Gezeichnet
