= Herbert Lichtenfeld =

Herbert Lichtenfeld (16 June 1927 in Leipzig – 11 December 2001 in Hamburg) was one of the most successful television screenplay writers in Germany. He wrote over 300 film scripts. Many of his scripts were successful in Germany.

== Life ==
After graduating in Leipzig, Lichtenfeld moved into the Federal Republic, and there worked as a reporter on several newspapers. In the 1960s he became the television correspondent for Hörzu magazine. At this time he started to write radio plays and books. From 1968 he worked full-time as a screenplay writer. His first television film Deutschlandreise (German Journey) (1970, co-production between NDR and NRK) was awarded with the Grimme-Preis.

A little later he began a partnership with the then still unknown director Wolfgang Petersen. Together they developed a series about police detective Finke (Klaus Schwarzkopf) for the TV series Tatort. These achieved ratings of over seventy per cent. The high point of this series was Reifezeugnis (1974) with Nastassja Kinski and Christian Quadflieg, about a relationship between a teacher and a pupil.

While Wolfgang Petersen moved to the cinema and today works successfully in Hollywood, Lichtenfeld remained a writer for television. Besides writing further Tatort scripts he wrote for other crime film series such as The Old Fox.

Also outside of the crime film genre he wrote numerous books, radio plays, television films and television series. Lichtenfeld's film scripts were always complex, with very precise dialogue, often not without a shot of irony.

=== The Black Forest Clinic ===
Lichtenfeld's greatest success was The Black Forest Clinic (Die Schwarzwaldklinik). Lichtenfeld is often called the inventor of The Black Forest Clinic. But the idea to create a series in a hospital in the Black Forest was conceived by producer Wolfgang Rademann, who gave the screenplay writing job to Lichtenfeld. The series, featuring the white-coated Professor Brinkmann, attracted audiences of 25 million.

Lichtenfeld wrote all the scripts for The Black Forest Clinic, as well as his own series Der Landarzt, centring on physician Dr. Matthiesen in the fictitious small town of Deekelsen in Schleswig-Holstein. Lichtenfeld wrote all the episodes until 1997.

In the early 1990s Lichtfeld was one of the most sought after screenwriters on German television. Among other series he wrote Das Traumschiff, and Hotel Paradies (1990), Unsere Hagenbecks (1991), Immer wieder Sonntag (1993-1995), Vater wider Willen (1995), and several successful television films. Lichtenfeld's final film, Jugendsünde (Youth Sin) appeared in 2000.

== Selected filmography ==
- Tysklandsreisen (a.k.a. Die Deutschlandreise, dir. Sølve Kern, 1970, TV film)
- Tatort: Blechschaden (dir. Wolfgang Petersen, 1971, TV series episode)
- Tatort: Strandgut (dir. Wolfgang Petersen, 1972, TV series episode)
- Tatort: Jagdrevier (dir. Wolfgang Petersen, 1973, TV series episode)
- Tatort: Nachtfrost (dir. Wolfgang Petersen, 1974, TV series episode)
- Tatort: Eine todsichere Sache (dir. Thomas Fantl, 1974, TV series episode)
- Tatort: Die Rechnung wird nachgereicht (dir. Fritz Umgelter, 1975, TV series episode)
- Tatort: Tod eines Einbrechers (dir. Rolf von Sydow, 1975, TV series episode)
- Tatort: Kurzschluß (dir. Wolfgang Petersen, 1975, TV series episode)
- Tatort: Zwei Flugkarten nach Rio (dir. Fritz Umgelter, 1976, TV series episode)
- Tatort: Abendstern (dir. Wolfgang Becker, 1976, TV series episode)
- Tatort: Reifezeugnis (dir. Wolfgang Petersen, 1977, TV series episode)
- Tatort: Spätlese (dir. Wolfgang Staudte, 1977, TV series episode)
- The Old Fox: Lohngeld (dir. Dietrich Haugk, 1977, TV series episode)
- The Old Fox: Nachtmusik (dir. Helmut Ashley, 1978, TV series episode)
- Tatort: Lockruf (dir. Wolfgang Becker, 1978, TV series episode)
- Tatort: Himmelfahrt (dir. Rainer Wolffhardt, 1978, TV series episode)
- Tatort: Schweigegeld (dir. Hartmut Griesmayr, 1979, TV series episode)
- Tatort: Streifschuß (dir. Hartmut Griesmayr, 1980, TV series episode)
- Tatort: Beweisaufnahme (dir. Peter Keglevic, 1981, TV series episode)
- Die Stunde des Löwen (dir. Hartmut Griesmayr, 1982, TV film)
- Tatort: Kindergeld (dir. Hartmut Griesmayr, 1982, TV series episode)
- Tatort: Geburtstagsgrüße (dir. Georg Tressler, 1984, TV series episode)
- The Black Forest Clinic (1985–1989, TV series, 70 episodes)
- Mord im Spiel (dir. Hartmut Griesmayr, 1985, TV film)
- Der Landarzt (1987–1996, TV series, 91 episodes)
- In guten Händen (dir. Rolf von Sydow, 1988, TV film)
- Hotel Paradies (1990, TV series, 27 episodes)
- Marx & Coca-Cola (dir. Hartmut Griesmayr, 1991, TV film)
- Die Bank ist nicht geschädigt (dir. Hartmut Griesmayr, 1991, TV film)
- Im Teufelskreis (dir. Hartmut Griesmayr, 1993, TV film)
- Jugendsünde (dir. Vera Loebner, 2000, TV film)
