= Ursela Monn =

German-Swiss actress and singer

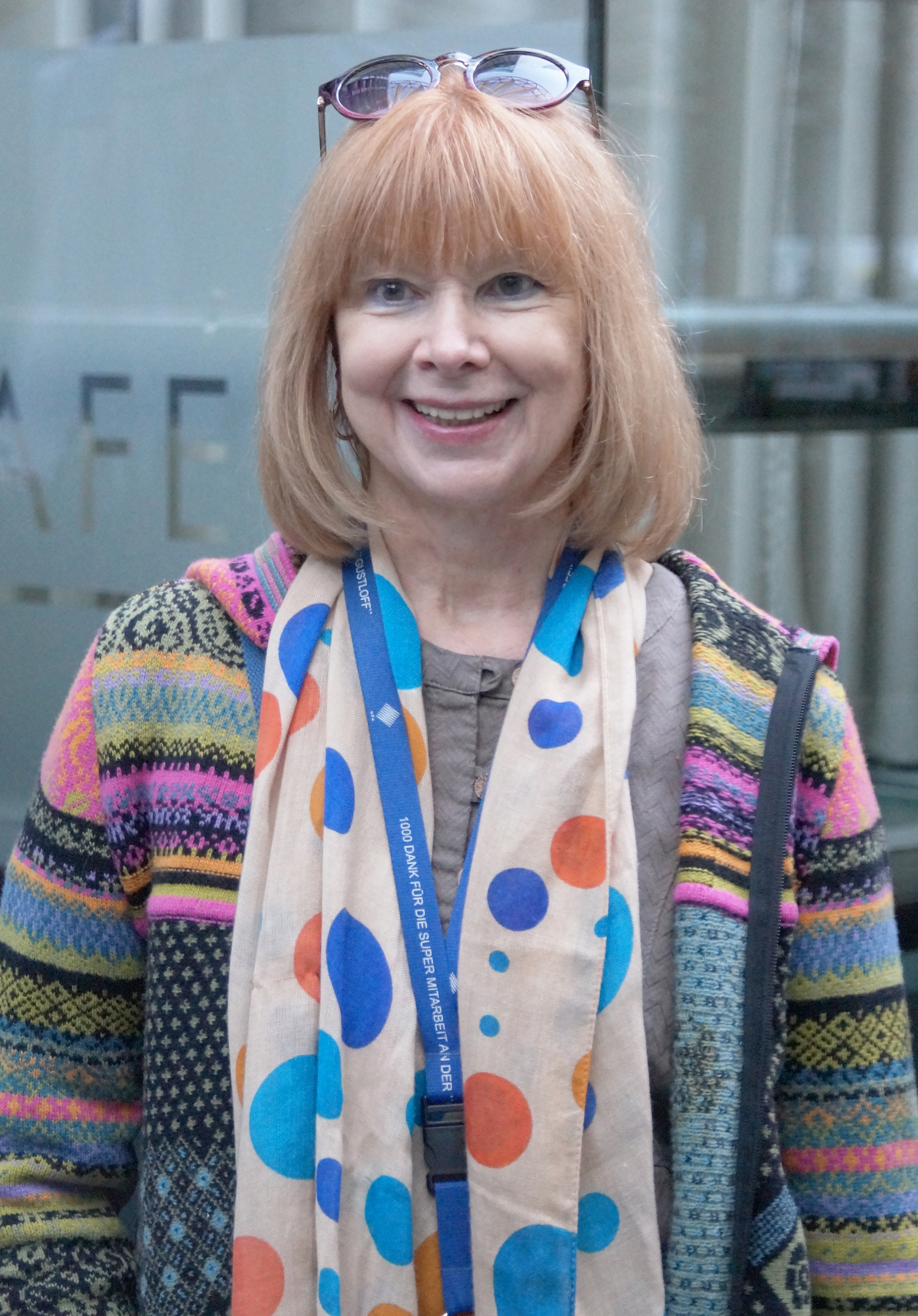
Monn in 2016

Ursela Monn (born 2 December 1945) is a German-Swiss actress and singer.

== Career ==
Monn is the daughter of a Swiss father and an Irish mother. From the age of 11 onward, she received ballet lessons. A year later, she attended the Max Reinhardt Seminar in Vienna. Her first stage role was a reproduction of Fiddler on the Roof. There, she collaborated with Boy Gobert of which before they concluded their drama at the Thalia Theatre in Hamburg. In 1976, she retired from there.

Monn's breakthrough came through the role of Rieke in the 13-part ZDF series Ein Mann will nach oben, based on the homonymous novel by Hans Fallada. This was followed by numerous appearances in television series and films. From 1998, Monn has played in theatres in Berlin, especially in the Renaissance Theatre, as well as in Munich and Düsseldorf. She has also appeared at the Theater an der Wien and the Theater am Neumarkt. Since 2006, she has portrayed Charlotte Baumgart in the television series Zoo Doctor: My Mom the Vet.

Monn also released albums as Rieke Jesänge, where she sang Berlin chansons.

She received the Order of Merit of Berlin and the Federal Cross of Merit for her advocacy of palliative care by hospices. On 20 January 2006, Monn was appointed as an ambassador for the Stiftung Pflege (Care Foundation), a German charity.

== Personal life ==
Monn was married to English director Ralph Bridle. Her current husband is Michael Wintzer. She has a son, Marc (born 1981), and lives in Berlin.

== Filmography ==
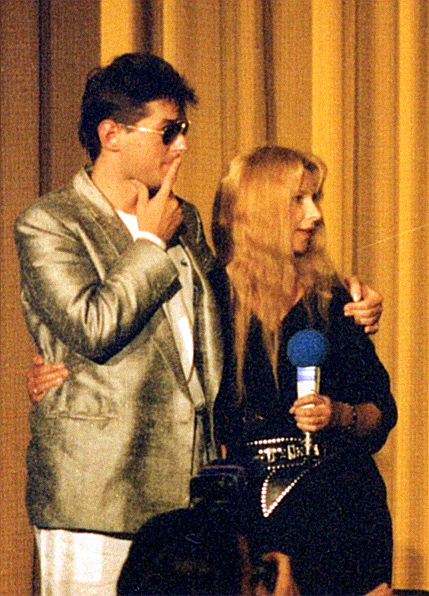
Monn with Falco at the premiere of Geld oder Leber! in Essen in 1986

=== Films ===
- 1978: Fist in the Pocket
- 1980: Why the UFOs Steal Our Lettuce
- 1985: Girl in a Boot
- 1986: Geld oder Leber!
- 1986: November Cats
- 1988: Ein Schweizer namens Nötzli
- 2006: Wo ist Fred?
- 2014: The Pasta Detectives
- 2015: The Pasta Detectives 2

=== TV ===
- 1973: Im Schillingshof
- 1974: Tatort – episode: "Gift"
- 1975: Hoftheater (TV series)
- 1976: Alle Jahre wieder – Die Familie Semmeling (TV miniseries)
- 1978: Ein Mann will nach oben (TV miniseries)
- 1979: So 'ne und so 'ne
- 1979: For All the Gold in the Transvaal
- 1979: Ick baumle mit de Beene
- 1981: Das Traumschiff – episode: "Die erste Reise: Karibik" (TV series)
- 1985: Spiel im Schloß
- 1986: Jokehnen (TV series)
- 1986: Zieh den Stecker raus, das Wasser kocht
- 1986: Didi – Der Untermieter (TV series)
- 1987: Praxis Bülowbogen – Rhythmusstörungen
- 1987: Wartesaal zum kleinen Glück
- 1989: Berliner Weiße mit Schuß – Ist das 'n Urlaub (TV series)
- 1989: Eine Bonner Affäre
- 1989: Derrick – Die Kälte des Lebens (TV crime series)
- 1990: Mich will ja keiner
- 1991–1993: Der Hausgeist
- 1991–1993: Unser Lehrer Doktor Specht (TV series)
- 1993: Vater braucht eine Frau (TV series)
- 1993: Stich ins Herz
- 1994: Die Kommissarin – episode: "Schokoladenkönig", as Dagmar Lang (TV series)
- 1997: Das Recht auf meiner Seite
- 1997: Großstadtrevier – episode: "Das zweite Gesicht" (TV series)
- 1998: Dr. Monika Lindt (TV series)
- 1999: Der Landarzt (TV series)
- 1999–2000: Klinik unter Palmen (TV series)
- 2004: The Amber Amulet (TV film)
- 2004: Liebe ohne Rückfahrschein
- 2006–2010, 2013: Tierärztin Dr. Mertens (TV series)
- 2008–2011: Doctor's Diary (TV series)
- 2008: Putzfrau Undercover
- 2009: Tango im Schnee
- 2009: SOKO 5113 (TV series)
- 2012: Plötzlich 70! (TV series)
- 2013: Rosamunde Pilcher: Alte Herzen rosten nicht
- 2015: Einfach Rosa (TV series)

== Radio plays ==
- Regina Regenbogen, as narrator
- Julia, die Meisterdetektivin (two-part radio drama series), as Julia
- Kleine Hexe Klavi-Klack (radio drama series 1978–1984), as Klavi-Klack
- TKKG, episodes: "Die weiße Schmuggler-Yacht", "Anschlag auf den Silberpfeil", "Hotel in Flammen", Schüsse aus der Rosenhecke"
- Die drei Fragezeichen und der heimliche Hehler – episode 37, as Regina
- Antares 8 (radio drama), as Tatjana
- Das Geheimnis der englischen Silberschalen by Stefan Murr (1980)

== Awards ==
- 1978: Golden Camera for Ein Mann will nach oben
- 1979: Bambi Award
- 1979: Berlin Art Prize, category 'Performing Arts'
- 1985: Ernst-Lubitsch-Award for Girl in a Boot
- 1985: German Film Award 'Beste Darstellerin' for Girl in a Boot
- 1997: Order of Merit of Berlin
- 2001: Order of Merit of the Federal Republic of Germany
- 2005: Goldener Vorhang of the Club Theatre Berlin for 'Best Role' in Acht Frauen, with Robert Thomas
- 2009: German Comedy Award for Doctors Diary as 'Best Comedy Series'
- 2015: Berliner Bär (award of German newspaper B.Z.)
