= Carol Campbell (actress) =

German actress (born 1966)

- Born: Carol Campbell; May 27, 1966 (age 59); Munich, West Germany
- Occupations: Dancer, actress, model, presenter, yoga coach
- Years active: 1985–present
- Website: yoga-carolcampbell.de

Carol Campbell (born 27 May 1966 in Munich, West Germany) is an Afro-German actress, model, presenter and yoga coach.

== Biography ==
Campbell is the daughter of a German casting agent and make-up artist and an African-American jazz musician from New York. She studied acting, singing, dance and presenting in Berlin (where she moved with her mother at the age of five) and Los Angeles. Today she lives in Berlin.

After her debut at the Deutsche Oper Berlin (Tanztheater) in 1985, she moved 1987 to Paris and worked until 1989 as solo dancer at the Lido and 1990 at the Moulin Rouge as Meneuse de Revue. Campbell is 6 ft 2 in (1.88 m). In 1999 Campbell featured on the cover and in a ten-page article in the November issue of the German edition of the Playboy magazine.

Her TV work started as presenter with the German television stations VOX (Avanti Magazin), Premiere (Airplay LiveKonzerte, Spezials), VIVA (Chartshow), RTL II (RHS Gold Musikshow) and ZDF (Big-Bubbles Musikmagazin). She appeared in guest roles in numerous TV series like Vater wider Willen (together with Christian Quadflieg und Suzanne von Borsody), Tatort and Der Pfundskerl, as well as in the leading role in TV plays like Julia - Kämpfe für deine Träume! and Du oder keine. Campbell also appeared in several movies, including City of Fear by writer Harry Alan Towers where she played Alexa the female lead role beside Gary Daniels.

Campbell worked also in various presenting roles at Daimler Chrysler, Siemens, Adidas, Hugo Boss, IBM, Debis and CeBit corporate events and as media training coach and participates at The Applause Institute.

She is a member of the Deutsche Filmakademie and founder member of SFD - Schwarze Filmschaffende in Deutschland (Black Artists in German Film). She is also the 1. Chairperson of SFD.

In 2007 Campbell was trained as creative producer for films and television at the Institute for Drama, Film- and Television Professions (iSFF) in Berlin. She worked also as presenter.

Carol Campbell works also as yoga teacher in Berlin and teaches "public speaking and presentation skills" at the design akademie berlin (SRH Hochschule für Kommunikation und Design). In January 2019 Campbell started with producer and songwriter George Kaleve a weekly podcast in German called abgehängt.

In 2023 Campbell appeared in the Arte.tv series Unhappy in the episode Das Versprechen der Schönheit.

== TV work ==
- Unhappy - Das Versprechen der Schönheit (season 1) (2023)
- Nachtschicht - Blutige Stadt (2007)
- Nachtschicht - Ich habe Angst (2007)
- Fünf Sterne (season 2, episode 31) (2007)
- SK Kölsch - Dunkle Geschäfte (2006)
- Miss Texas (2005)
- Sabine - Gefährliche Liebschaften (2005)
- Schlosshotel Orth - Konsequenzen (2004)
- Sabine - Drei Engel für Johnny (2004)
- Tatort - Die Liebe und ihr Preis (2003)
- Die Hinterbänkler - Die Homestory (2002)
- Im Visier der Zielfahnder - Die Falle (2002)
- Edel & Starck Series (2002–2004) as Dr. Schnüll
- Denninger - Der Mann mit den zwei Gesichtern (2001)
- Du oder keine (2001)
- Drehkreuz Airport Series (2001) as Nicole Weber
- Der Pfundskerl Series (1999–2004) as Tanja Roloff
- Der Runner (2000)
- Wolffs Revier aka Wolff's Turf (International: English title) - Yankee-Bomber (2000)
- Denninger (1999)
- Prosit Neujahr (1999)
- Zielfahnder (1999)
- Alarm für Cobra 11 - Die Autobahnpolizei - Ein einsamer Sieg (1999)
- Herzflimmern (1998)
- Tatort - Engelchen flieg (1998)
- Julia - Kämpfe für deine Träume! (1998)
- SOKO 5113 - Killing (1998)
- Betrogen - Eine Ehe am Ende aka Betrogen - Ich hasse meinen Mann (Germany) (1997)
- Tatort - Tod im All (1997)
- Polizeiruf 110 - Lauf oder stirb (1996)
- Die Unzertrennlichen (1996)
- Vater wider Willen Series (1995)
- Tatort - Die Kampagne (1995)
- Brennende Herzen (1995)
- Der König (1995)
- Lemgo (1994)
- Die Partner (1994)
- Liebe ist Privatsache Series (1993)

== Movie work ==
- Karls Weihnachten aka Karl's Christmas Short film (2006) as angel Sarah
- City of Fear (2001)
- Jedermanns Fest (2001)
- Fandango aka Fandango - Members Only (1998)
- Drei Mädels von der Tankstelle aka Babes' Petrol (USA) (1996)
