= Wolfgang Rademann =

German television producer and journalist

Wolfgang Rademann (24 November 1934 – 31 January 2016), also known as John Weidner, was a German television producer and journalist.

== Life ==
Rademann was born in Neuenhagen bei Berlin on 24 November 1934. He worked as a journalist and then as a television producer in Germany. He lived with German actress Ruth Maria Kubitschek in Berlin. He was a major influence on the entertainment program of Germany's public television station ZDF, where he was responsible for popular television series such as Das Traumschiff and The Black Forest Clinic.

Wolfgang Rademann lived in a detached house in Berlin-Nikolassee. He had been in a relationship with the actress Ruth Maria Kubitschek since 1976. He was also known for his "Berliner Schnauze". His grave is located in the Protestant churchyard of Berlin-Nikolassee.

Rademann died on 31 January 2016 in Berlin at the age of 81.

== Television productions ==
- 1964: Das Leben ist die größte Show (together with Henno Lohmeyer)
- Zwischenstation
- Gefragte Gäste
- Der Stargast
- Sing mit Horst (Horst Jankowski)
- Peter-Alexander-Show (actor Peter Alexander)
- Anneliese Rothenberger gibt sich die Ehre (actress Anneliese Rothenberger)
- Anneliese Rothenberger stellt sich vor
- Lilli Palmer: Eine Frau bleibt eine Frau (actress Lilli Palmer)
- Die Wenche Myhre Show (actress Wenche Myhre)
- Ein verrücktes Paar (actor Harald Juhnke and actress Grit Boettcher)
- Künstlerstammtisch (TV-moderator Gustav Knuth)
- Blauer Dunst
- Treffpunkt Herz
- Insel der Träume, television series
- The Black Forest Clinic, television series (1985–1989)
- Das Traumschiff (since 1981)

== Awards ==
- Bambi Award (1982, 1985, 1990, 2015)
- 1982 and 2000: Goldene Kamera
- 1986: Order of Merit of the Federal Republic of Germany
- 1990: Telestar
- 2008: Goldener Gong
- 2009: Krone der Volksmusik
