= Ottfried Fischer =

German actor

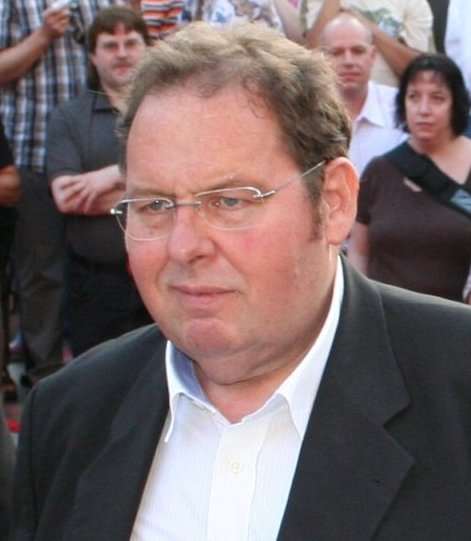
- Fischer in 2009
- Born: 7 November 1953 (age 72); Ornatsöd, Lower Bavaria, West Germany
- Occupations: Actor, Kabarett artist
- Years active: 1980–2013

Ottfried Fischer (German: [ˈɔtˌfʁiːt ˈfɪʃɐ]; born 7 November 1953) is a retired German actor and Kabarett artist best known for his role as Benno Berghammer in the popular German TV series Der Bulle von Tölz. He is a supporter of the Social Democratic Party of Germany.

== Personal life ==
Fischer was born to Werner Fischer and Maria Fischer (née Wagner) on 7 November 1953 on the farm "Ornatsöd" in Untergriesbach, Lower Bavaria. He began studying law at LMU Munich but quit his studies after a short time and founded the "Münchner Hinterhoftheater" (Munich back alley theater) with some friends in 1980, where he started as a Kabarett artist and actor.

In 2008, Fischer informed the press that he has Parkinson's disease.

== Career ==
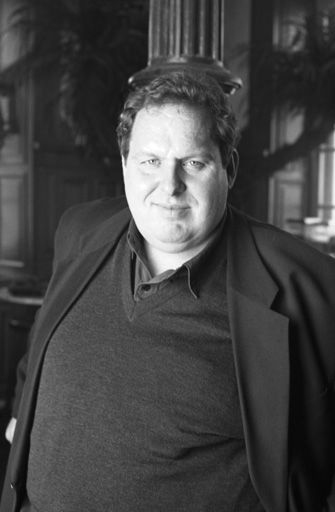
Fischer in 1998

=== Kabarett ===
In 1983, Austrian Kabarett artist Werner Schneyder invited Fischer to his television show Meine Gäste und ich. In 1989, he has his first solo performance as a Kabarett artist with his program "Schwer ist leicht was". In 1994, he toured with his second program "Was tun".

In 1990, Fischer was on Mitternachtsspitzen with Richard Rogler and since 1995 he is the host of Ottis Schlachthof, a show dedicated to interviewing solo Kabarett artists and giving a platform to newcomers.

=== Acting ===
While working as a Kabarett artist, Fischer also worked as an actor in multiple films and television series. Franz Xaver Bogner arranged his first television appearance in the series Zeit genug and in 1985 Bogner offered him the lead in the series Irgendwie und Sowieso and a part on Zur Freiheit. Later Fischer worked on several films, including Ein Prachtexemplar (1989), The Nasty Girl (1990), Café Europa (1990), Go Trabi Go (1991) and Superstau (1991).

In 1993, Fischer acted alongside Wolfgang Fierek in Ein Bayer auf Rügen. His greatest success began in 1995 when he took the lead in Der Bulle von Tölz. From 1999 to 2005, he starred in Der Pfundskerl and since 2003 he is the lead actor in Pfarrer Braun, a series loosely based on Father Brown.

== Filmography ==
=== Films ===
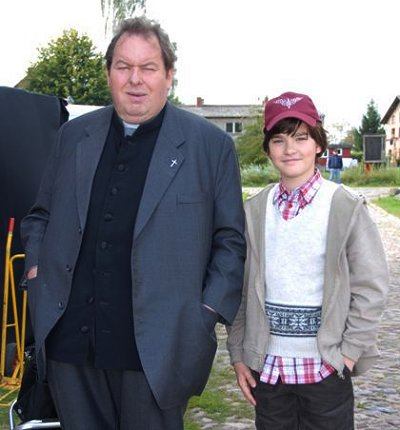
Fischer with Patrick Mölleken on the set of Pfarrer Braun

- Kampftag (1982)
- Echt tu matsch (1983)
- Kolp (1984)
- Three Crazy Jerks (1987)
- Starke Zeiten (1988)
- Schön war die Zeit (1988)
- Ein Prachtexemplar (1989)
- The Nasty Girl (1990)
- Café Europa (1990)
- Go Trabi Go (1991)
- Superstau (1991)
- Ich schenk dir die Sterne (1991)
- All Lies (1992)
- Langer Samstag (1992)
- At the Edge of Paradise (1993)
- Immer Ärger mit Nicole (1993)
- Asterix Conquers America (1994) as Obelix (German Dub)
- Abbuzze! Der Badesalz-Film (1996)
- Workaholic (1996)
- Die Superbullen (1997)
- Ballermann 6 (1997)
- Qualtingers Wien (1997)
- Drei Herren (1998)
- Das große Krabbeln (1998)
- Die blaue Kanone (1999)
- Der Bestseller (2000)
- Eine Insel zum Träumen – Koh Samui (2001)
- Andreas Hofer (2002)
- Die Dickköpfe (2002)
- Der Bestseller – Mord auf italienisch (2002)
- Crazy Race (2003)
- Crazy Race 2 – Warum die Mauer wirklich fiel (2003)
- Shark Attack in the Mediterranean (2003)
- Der Bestseller – Wiener Blut (2004)
- König Otto (2006)
- Crazy Race 3 – Sie knacken jedes Schloss (2006)
- Tödliche Verbindungen (2007)
- African Race – Die verrückte Jagd nach dem Marakunda (2007)
- Tage wie Jahre (2008)

=== Television series ===
- Zeit genug (1982)
- Familie Meier (1983)
- Blam! (1985)
- Irgendwie und Sowieso (1986)
- Die Hausmeisterin (1987)
- Zur Freiheit (1987)
- Der Schwammerlkönig (1988)
- Josef Filser (1989)
- Die schnelle Gerdi (1989)
- Ein Schloß am Wörthersee (1990)
- Almenrausch und Pulverschnee (1993)
- Ein Bayer auf Rügen (1993–1997)
- Alle meine Töchter (1995)
- Der Bulle von Tölz (1995–2009)
- Beck (1997–1998)
- MA 2412 (1998)
- Der Pfundskerl (2000–2003)
- Pfarrer Braun (2003–2013)

== Awards ==
- Salzburger Stier (1986)
- Deutscher Kleinkunstpreis (with Jockel Tschiersch) (1986)
- Goldener Gong (with Ruth Drexel) (1997)
- Bul le Mérite by the Bund deutscher Kriminalbeamter (1998)
- Goldene Romy – best actor in a TV series (1998)
- Goldene Romy – best actor in a TV series (2001)
- Goldene Romy – best actor in a TV series (2002)
- Goldene Romy – best actor in a TV series (2004)
- Orden wider den tierischen Ernst (2012)

Additionally, in 2006 the Austrian post office created a postage stamp in his honor.
