= Quadflieg =

Quadflieg is a surname. Notable people with the surname include:

- Christian Quadflieg (1945–2023), German television actor and director
- Will Quadflieg (1914–2003), German actor, father of Christian
