= Bengsch =

Bengsch is a German surname. Notable people with the surname include:

- Alfred Bengsch (1921–1979), German Cardinal of the Roman Catholic Church
- Hubertus Bengsch (born 1952), German actor
- Robert Bengsch (born 1983), German track cyclist
