= Zoo Doctor: My Mom the Vet =

German television series

- Also known as: Tierärztin Dr. Mertens
- Genre: Family
- Written by: Scarlett Kleint; Annette Hess; Kerstin Höckel; Christiane Bubner
- Directed by: Heidi Kranz; Mathias Luther; Karola Hattop; Thomas Nennstiel
- Starring: Elisabeth Lanz; Sven Martinek; Gunter Schoß; Ursela Monn; Thorsten Wolf; Elisabeth Böhm; Michael Lesch
- Composer: Rainer Oleak
- Country of origin: Germany
- Original language: German
- No. of seasons: 9
- No. of episodes: 98

Production
- Producers: Oliver Vogel; Susanne Wolfram; Karsten Rühle
- Production locations: Leipzig (Zoo Leipzig), Saxony
- Cinematography: Christoph Krauss; Ralph Netzer; Hermann Dunzendorfer
- Editors: Jana Brandt; Karl-Heinz Staamann; Franka Bauer; Meike Götz
- Running time: 50 Minutes
- Production company: Saxonia Media Filmproduktion

Original release
- Network: Das Erste
- Release: 10 October 2006 – 24 April 2025

Zoo Doctor: My Mom the Vet (Tierärztin Dr. Mertens) is a German television series, broadcast by ARD, based on the 2002 television film of the same name. The series is co-produced by Saxonia Media and Bavaria Film. Leipzig Zoo serves as the backdrop, and the series is filmed in Leipzig and the surrounding area.

== Synopsis ==
=== Season 1 ===
Prof. Georg Baumgart works as director at Leipzig Zoo, Dr. Martin Vogel as veterinarian, Conrad "Conny" Weidner as head animal keeper and Annett Melzer as animal keeper. At the beginning of the series, Prof. Baumgart is forced into retirement and is succeeded by Dr. Reinhard Fährmann, while his daughter, Dr. Susanne Mertens starts working as Dr. Vogel's assistant. Dr. Vogel quickly resigns and Susanne is offered the new position as the Zoo veterinarian. At the end of the season, Annett, who wants to study veterinary medicine, becomes Susanne's assistant.

Susanne's private life is stormy. She is married to Klaus, a businessman, and they have a son, Jonas. Klaus is having an affair with his assistant Alexandra. When Susanne finds out, she moves in with her parents, taking Jonas with her. Jonas is best friends with Rebecca Lentz. Her father Dr. Christoph Lentz and Susanne get to know each other through their children. Christoph immediately falls in love with Susanne, which is mutual, but Jonas is overwhelmed by the separation and his parents' new partners. After a trip with Klaus, Alexandra and Jonas, Alexandra is less than enthusiastic and demands that Klaus choose between her and Jonas. Klaus and Alexandra separate. Klaus wants to save his marriage, but Susanne wants a divorce. Klaus, Alexandra and Jonas try to reconcile during a visit to the circus. Klaus and Susanne divorce, Klaus gets back together with Alexandra, and Susanne, Christoph and the children move in together.

=== Season 2 ===
With Ms Wittig, Dr Fährmann's secretary, there is a new addition to the zoo's staff. Dr. Fährmann plans to expand the zoo with a tropical hall the size of three football fields. However, Leipzig's mayor, Günter Herrenbrück, is not in favour of the project because it is too expensive. Dr. Fährmann is promoting his project through the state secretary, Dr. Lena Weingarten, and their collaboration eventually blossoms into a romance, which the two want to keep secret at all costs. Mayor Herrenbrück confronts Dr. Fährmann with the fact that the relationship between Dr. Fährmann and Dr. Weingarten is not purely professional. Dr. Weingarten then feels compelled to end the relationship in order to maintain her professional status. Mayor Herrenbrück tries to get rid of Dr. Fährmann as zoo director and sets an auditor on the zoo. However, the auditor finds that the budget is not only balanced but that a profit has been made. Dr. Fährmann is finally able to push through his model.

As for Susanne's private life, Christoph's daughter Rebecca returns from the United States accompanied by her mother. Viola Lentz temporarily moves in with the Mertens/Lentz patchwork family and causes quite a stir, as she wants to win back her daughter and ex-husband. Later, Viola moves into her own flat. When Rebecca is seriously injured in a car accident with Viola and Jonas, Viola decides to withdraw and fly back to the USA. She persuades Rebecca to come with her, but at the last moment the girl decides against it. Her mother flies back to the United States alone.

Klaus wants to move his company headquarters to Berlin and also move there. Jonas eventually goes to Berlin with Klaus, but visits his mother, Rebecca and Christoph frequently. Susanne becomes pregnant but loses the baby in an accident at the zoo. This almost causes Susanne and Christoph's relationship to break down again.

Susanne's parents find new things to do. Georg devotes himself to a project to reintroduce wolves and therefore spends a lot of time in the forest and attending lectures. Charlotte pursues her passion for painting more intensively. Things take a dramatic turn when Charlotte is diagnosed with breast cancer and refuses to have surgery. In the end, however, her family convinces her that her life does not have to be over yet. After a successful operation, followed by radiation and rehabilitation, Charlotte is completely healthy again.

=== Season 3 ===
Annett quits for vet school; her seat goes to over-qualified Nicole Sommer, who wins Dr Fährmann's mentorship and love but schemes to oust Susanne. After mishandling a sick camel, Nicole is fired and dumped, letting Annett reclaim her old post. Ms Wittig, sidelined by a slipped disc, is covered by Ms Weber.

Susanne's life spins too. Jonas now boards at a Berlin sports school; a miscarriage and uterine growths end her hopes of pregnancy, so she and Christoph plan to adopt and get engaged - only to be rejected because of her age. Hidden letters reveal Christoph's long-estranged father, ex-pediatrician Dr Matthias Lentz. Susanne tracks him to Magdeburg, where they meet and Christoph saves him from a heart attack; Matthias moves to a care home but often visits his son. At the hospital Christoph meets six-year-old Luisa, an asthmatic girl abused by her alcoholic parents. He and Susanna become her foster parents, Christoph repairs a heart defect, and after Luisa's mother testifies against her violent husband, Susanne and Christoph can adopt Luisa. Christoph is promoted to Chief physician. Their wedding, arranged by Charlotte, Georg and Viola, collapses when Susanne faints from an infection. The wedding is cancelled.

Meanwhile, Charlotte starts art school and studies in Italy; Georg accepts a half-time zoo-curator post in China. For their 40th anniversary, they renew their vows.

=== Season 4 ===
Mayor Herrenbrück approves a full-time curator for the zoo and suggests Dr. Tom Berkhoff for the position, asking him to become his informant on the zoo cost savings and help dismiss Dr. Fährmann. Berkhoff refuses, and while Dr. Fährmann wants Georg Baumgart to stay, the board still chooses Berkhoff. Annett falls for Tom, but he's interested in Susanne. Dr. Fährmann pushes for a therapy zoo project, but the board denies the funding. An association is formed for donations, but an embezzlement investigation leads to Dr. Fährmann's suspension. Dr. Berkhoff becomes the acting director, and soon the correct receipt clears Fährmann. Berkhoff leaves for Africa, and Fährmann convinces the board to appoint Georg as curator.

Susanne returns from a clinic, Jonas moves to London, and Klaus follows him there with his girlfriend. Rebecca falls in love with Theo, but Christoph thinks their relations is moving too fast. Christopher's father Matthias moves in with Susanne and Christoph instead of his retirement home. Christoph almost loses his job when a boy falls into a coma after an appendectomy, but avoid the crisis with Mathias' help. Susanne is looking for new challenges and begins postgraduate studies in ornithology with Tom Berkhoff. Christoph notices that Susanne has feelings for Tom, which leads to a serious relationship crisis. Although she tries not to give in to her feelings, she and Tom end up kissing and later spending the night together. However, Susanne decides to fight for her relationship with Christoph, and they reconcile. Christopher then gets a research offer in Brazil, which causes more uncertainty in their couple, but eventually he accepts the offer insisting on the option to work remotely.

Rebecca and Luisa try to set up Matthias, who eventually falls for Ursula. Charlotte and Georg struggle to finance an art gallery but face financial ruin. Christoph helps, and with Matthias' help, Charlotte's paintings are exhibited. Georg becomes curator, and they pay off the mortgage. Matthias proposes to Ursula, and she accepts.

=== Season 5 ===
Dr Reinhard Fährmann dies in an accident in Africa and Dr Susanne Mertens becomes the acting zoo director. Mayor Herrenbrück is looking for a successor and eventually hires Dr Roman Blum, who causes a stir at the Leipzig Zoo. He is strict, quick-tempered and sometimes unfair. Dr Blum also has multiple sclerosis, but is determined to keep this a secret. At the end of the season, he decides to be open about his illness and confesses the truth to Mayor Herrenbrück. However, contrary to expectations, the mayor does not fire him, but stands behind him and his work. Annett begins further training to become a master animal keeper, but fails the final exam due to an anxiety.

Christoph returns from one of his trips to Brazil and confesses that he has fallen in love with a colleague. Susanne kicks Christoph out and moves into a new flat with Luisa and Jonas. The separation is particularly difficult for Luisa, her grades are getting worse. She decides to search for her biological parents, but hides their visit from Susanne. Susanne eventually finds out and supports Luisa when the girl realises that her parents do not know what to do with her. Jonas is expelled from his boarding school for doping and returns to Leipzig from London. He takes part in an illegal car race, has an accident and is sentenced by the court to 80 hours of community service at Leipzig Zoo. He eventually grows up from his troubles and decides to train as a police officer with the aim of working for the special forces later on. His girlfriend Maja, on the other hand, wants to move to London to study, which causes them to break up. Christoph wants to marry his new girlfriend on his next trip to Brazil but after the trip he confesses to Susanne that he did not get married because he still has feelings for her. But Susanne is not ready for a reconciliation.

In the end, Susanne and Christoph meet Luisa and Jonas at Charlotte and Georg's house for a barbecue to celebrate Luisa's good report card and Jonas' acceptance into the police academy. After Georg quits his job as a curator, he devotes himself to a project to protect local wolves. Charlotte finds a new occupation leading a support group for cancer patients.

=== Season 6 ===
Dr. Susanne Mertens is acting zoo director for the second time, as Dr. Roman Blum has resigned . Annett Melzer is on maternity leave. Rebecca has moved back to Leipzig from Dresden and Susanne offers her the opportunity to continue her veterenary training in Leipzig. However, Rebecca does not stay long, as she is drawn to Zurich Zoo. Dr Amal Bekele becomes a new zoo director and brings her assistant, Robert Jansen, with her. Susanne hires Karoline Schneider as her assistant. Dr Bekele wants to expand the zoo to include a South American enclosure on a vacant adjacent site. Mayor Günter Herrenbrück also wants to build a hotel on the same site. Dr Bekele manages to prevent both of the mayor's projects and breaks ground for her South American enclosure.

Susanne has the house to herself, as Luisa is at boarding school in England for four weeks and Jonas is doing his police training in Chemnitz. At a charity concert at Leipzig Zoo, she meets pianist Hannes Zoller, and their casual affair quickly develops between the two. Susanne receives a job offer from Vienna, and she seriously considers moving to Vienna., while Hannes wants to move to Berlin with her. Jonas comes with big news - he has a girlfriend, Marie, in Chemnitz and they are expecting twins. Marie has fallen out with her parents and the couple thinks about moving Leipzig, so Susanne decides to choose her family over her career and breaks up with Hannes. After the birth, Marie and Jonas' relationship falls apart, Marie moves back to her parents' and Jonas decides to follow her nevertheless. Susanne and Christoph grow closer again and spend a night together. In the end, the two fly to Spain to walk the Camino de Santiago together.

=== Season 7 ===
Two years have passed since the events of the previous season. Dr. Amal Bekele is desperately searching for a replacement for Robert, as she has dismisses every candidate after a short time. Finally, she decides to rehire Robert. Robert is now in a relationship with Karoline, and Dr Bekele does not approve relationships at workplace. She herself is in a relationship with Henry Keane, and their professional lives crash when Dr Bekele finds out that his animal rights activists group protests her entertainment project at the zoo. Georg Baumgart acts as mediator, sitting down at the table with Mayor Herrenbrück, Dr Bekele, Robert, Susanne and Henry. But even after several rounds of negotiations the protests continue, with Susanne's foster daughter Luisa also taking part. At a farewell dinner, where Henry announces that he is leaving Leipzig, he finally convinces Dr Bekele to change her mind.

After Susanne leaves the zoo, Karoline becomes the acting zoo veterinarian. Susanne plans to go to Borneo for six months with Christoph when they find out that Susanne is pregnant. Susanne and Christoph do not know what to think at first but eventually they decide to have the baby. Christoph also proposes to Susanne again, and she accepts. Meanwhile, Luisa has become a vegetarian and is committed to animal welfare and environmental protection. Together with Charlotte, for example, she releases sand lizards on a site where a landfill is to be built in the future in order to prevent the project from going ahead. When Marie notices that her children look more like her ex-boyfriend than Jonas, she realizes that Jonas is not their father. She does not want Jonas to see the children anymore, and with a heavy heart, he lets his children go.

=== Season 8 ===
Susanne has been through a dramatic time. Not only did she lose her baby, but also her husband Christoph, who died in a car accident. She works as a self-employed veterinarian and is occasionally called in by the zoo to help with problem cases. She did not really want to return to her old workplace, which is now run by zoo director Winter, but changes her mind when her financial situation becomes increasingly difficult. When she gets to know Mike Redmann, the owner of an alpaca farm, the two become friends. At first, Susanne is reluctant because her memories of Christoph are still very strong, but Mike's persistence pays off in the end and she enters into a relationship with him.

== Series Development ==
Zoo Doctor: My Mom the Vet first appeared in a television film set in Leipzig Zoo in 2002, and was intended to be a one-off story. However, due to high viewing figures, a whole series was commissioned, which, with more than six million viewers, is one of the most successful series on ARD. Many roles were recast for the series. Elisabeth Lanz took over the role of Susanne Mertens from Christina Plate. Ludwig Zimmeck remained in his role as Jonas Mertens and Horst Günter Marx as Klaus Mertens. Gunter Schoß switched from the role of Susanne Mertens' boss Dr. Vogel to that of her father Georg Baumgart.

In 2010, a series special was filmed in for the viewers to look over the shoulders of the main actors and animals on set and behind the camera, and the animal trainers revealed how they calm zebras, snakes and eagle owls and which pigs do exactly what they are asked to do.

At Christmas 2011, a crossover with the television series In aller Freundschaft was broadcast: the series special Was wirklich zählt (What Really Matters), Dr. Susanne Mertens meets Chief physician Dr. Roland Heilmann (Thomas Rühmann).

The zoo scenes in the seventh season were not only shot at Leipzig Zoo, as usual, but also at Erfurt Zoo in Thuringia, Halle Zoological Garden and Magdeburg Zoological Garden.

== Broadcasting Statistics ==
Season	Episodes	Shooting	Broadcasting	Vievers	Market Share	DVD Publication
1	1–5	7. April till 8. July 2005	10. October till 7. November 2006	5,84 Mln.	17,7 %	2. March 2007
1	6–13	25. April till 21. August 2006	14. November 2006 till 16. January 2007	5,84 Mln.	17,7 %	2. March 2007
2	14–26	8. May till 5. December 2007	15. April till 22. July 2008	5,95 Mln.	21,1 %	15. July 2008
3	27–33	29. July till 17. November 2008	6. October till 17. November 2009	6,34 Mln.	19,5 %	15. December 2009
3	34–39	16. April till 17. July 2009	24. November 2009 till 19. January 2010	6,34 Mln.	19,5 %	15. December 2009
4	40–52	1. June 2010 till 1. June 2011	30. April till 23. July 2013	5,01 Mln.	18,2 %	4. November 2016
5	53–65	26. August 2014 till 23. July 2015	23. August till 22. November 2016	4,74 Mln.	15,5 %	4. November 2016
6	66–69	5. September till 27. October 2017	10. September till 10. December 2019	4,37 Mln.	14,4 %	13. December 2019
6	70–73	10. April till 5. June 2018	10. September till 10. December 2019	4,37 Mln.	14,4 %	13. December 2019
6	74–78	16. August till 13. September 2018	10. September till 10. December 2019	4,37 Mln.	14,4 %	13. December 2019
7	79–84	12. May 2020 till 30. July 2020	9. February till 23. March 2021	4,99 Mln.	15,2 %	–
8	85–97	3. May 2022 till 29. November 2022	11. April till 4. July 2023	4,31 Mln.	17,0 %	–
9	98–110	22. May till 28. November 2024	18. March till 24. June 2025	–	–	–
