= Insel der Träume (TV series) =

- Created by: Wolfgang Rademann
- Starring: Rolf Henniger (Prof. Sartorius); Andrea Heuer (Sandra)
- Country of origin: Germany, Austria
- No. of seasons: 2
- No. of episodes: 21

Production
- Running time: 45 minutes

Original release
- Network: ZDF, ORF
- Release: January 12 – December 28, 1991

Insel der Träume (Island of Dreams) was a German-Austrian television series, produced between 1990–1991.

After the final season of "Die Schwarzwaldklinik" (The Black Forest Clinic), the German TV-station ZDF (Zweites Deutsches Fernsehen, i.e. 2nd German Network) wanted to repeat the series' success and accepted Wolfgang Rademann's proposal for another adaption of a US-American TV-series. While already Die Schwarzwaldklinik was inspired by General Hospital, Rademann that time tried to transform the successful US-series Fantasy Island into a German version.

As well as Fantasy Island, Insel der Träume sets on a tropical island (Kawaii) somewhere in the Pacific. Each episode was about a guest coming from Germany to that isle hosted by the older, always white-dressed "professor" Gregor Sartorius and his young daughter Sandra.

Different from its American model (but according to Die Schwarzwaldklinik as a medical drama), it was openly presented that the island's visitors came there to become healed from a psychological problem. After a number of (therapeutical) talks with Sartorius or his daughter, the guests were brought to a mysterious waterfall, where they recognised during some kind of a vision the (true) reason for their problems. At the end of each episode, every guest left the island with a solution for his/ her problem or at least with a newly gained positive attitude towards life's complications.

Although copying its concept of happy-ending drama stories garnished with pictures of beautiful landscapes, Insel der Träume could not repeat the success of Die Schwarzwaldklinik and was cancelled after the second season.
