= Star Maidens =

1976 British-German science-fiction TV series

- Christiane Krüger (centre) and Lisa Harrow (right) in Star Maidens
- Also known as: Les Filles Du Ciel (France and French Canada); Die Mädchen aus dem Weltraum (Germany)
- Genre: Science fiction
- Created by: Jost Graf von Hardenberg
- Written by: Eric Paice; John Lucarotti; Ian Stuart Black; Otto Strang
- Directed by: Freddie Francis; James Gatward; Wolfgang Storch; Hans Heinrich
- Starring: Judy Geeson; Lisa Harrow; Christiane Krüger; Pierre Brice; Christian Quadflieg; Gareth Thomas; Derek Farr; Dawn Addams
- Composers: Berry Lipman and Patrick Aulton
- Countries of origin: United Kingdom; West Germany
- Original language: English
- No. of series: 1
- No. of episodes: 13

Production
- Producer: James Gatward
- Production locations: Bray Studios; On location: Windsor, Bracknell, Black Park
- Cinematography: Ken Hodges
- Editor: Robert C. Dearberg
- Running time: 25 minutes
- Production companies: Portman Productions; Scottish Television

Original release
- Network: ITV
- Release: 1 September – 1 December 1976

Star Maidens is a British-German science-fiction television series. Produced by Portman Productions in 1975 and partly financed by German company, Werbung-im-Rundfunk, it was first broadcast on the ITV network in 1976. It was filmed at Bray Studios and on location in Windsor and Bracknell, Berkshire, and Black Park, Buckinghamshire. It ran for a single season of thirteen half-hour episodes.

== Background ==
Star Maidens largely followed on the success of Space: 1999, another sci-fi tv programme and, at the time, the most expensive show produced for British television. While Star Maidens had a considerably lower budget, it shared the same production designer, Keith Wilson, the same sound editor, Peter Pennell, and special effects by Allan Bryce, leading to a similar look and feel for both series. Lead actresses Judy Geeson and Lisa Harrow had also appeared as star guests in Space:1999: Geeson in the episode "Another Time, Another Place" and Harrow in "The Testament of Arkadia".

According to the notes included in the series’ 2005 DVD release, "the German producers intended for the series to be a sex comedy, whereas the British producers intended the show to be intelligent science fiction." This clear disparity in creative vision likely contributed to Star Maidens lasting only one season, despite reasonable international sales.

== Synopsis ==
Planet Medusa, home to a highly evolved and technologically advanced humanoid race ruled by women, is knocked out of its orbit around Proxima Centauri by a rogue comet. Eventually, Medusa enters Earth's solar system. Two Medusan males, Adam (Pierre Brice) and Shem (Gareth Thomas), escape to Earth using a recently repaired ship. The pair are consequently pursued by Medusan security forces. When the Medusans, led by Supreme Councillors Fulvia (Judy Geeson) and Octavia (Christiane Krüger), fail to re-capture their two men, they take two human hostages – Dr Rudi Schmidt (Christian Quadflieg) and his assistant Dr Liz Becker (Lisa Harrow). The series focuses on the two groups’ attempts to adapt to life on the different planets while brokering an exchange for the hostages.

== Cast ==
- Judy Geeson as Supreme Councillor Fulvia
- Lisa Harrow as Dr. Liz Becker
- Pierre Brice as Adam
- Gareth Thomas as Shem
- Christian Quadflieg as Dr. Rudi Schmidt
- Christiane Krüger as Supreme Councillor Octavia
- Derek Farr as Professor Evans
- Dawn Addams as President Clara

== Episodes ==
No.	Title	Original release date
1	"Escape to Paradise"	1 September 1976
2	"Nemesis"	8 September 1976
3	"The Nightmare Cannon"	15 September 1976
4	"The Proton Storm"	22 September 1976
5	"Kidnap"	29 September 1976
6	"The Trial"	6 October 1976
7	"Test for Love"	13 October 1976
8	"The Perfect Couple"	20 October 1976
9	"What Have They Done to the Rain?"	27 October 1976
10	"The End of Time"	3 November 1976
11	"Hideout"	17 November 1976
12	"Creatures of the Mind"	24 November 1976
13	"The Enemy"	1 December 1976

== Themes ==
A clear reaction to the women's liberation movement of the 1970s, Star Maidens featured the reversal of gender roles, often for satirical effect. In a 1976 review, critic Stanley Eveling, writing for The Scotsman, claimed that in "lovely advanced planet" Medusa "Germaine Greer would be happy". Nevertheless, later reviewers tend to perceive the role reversal as "unsubtle" or "heavy-handed", with Michael W. Jackson opining that the motif "was daring at the time, but the execution is half-hearted."

== Reception ==
The series gained healthy global sales to over forty territories in Europe, Arab countries, South Africa, Australia, Canada, and the United States, where it ran on New York's WNEW-TV in 1978. Nevertheless, unlike contemporary British sci-fi shows like Doctor Who, Space: 1999, or Blakes 7, Star Maidens failed to gather a large Anglophone fan-base. Inconsistent time slots on ITV during the series' first run may be partly responsible for its failure to gain a wide audience.

In The Encyclopedia of Science Fiction, writer and journalist John Brosnan blamed the series' cost (high by British TV standards) and low audience rates for the show's cancelation after one season.

== Merchandise ==
=== Home video releases ===
All thirteen episodes of Star Maidens were released on Region 2 DVD from Delta Entertainment in 2005. The two-disc set includes an interview with actor Gareth Thomas as a special feature.

In 2017, the series was re-released on DVD by Simply Media with new cover artwork.

=== Novel ===
A novelisation of the series, written by Ian Evans (a pen-name of sci-fi author Angus Wells), was published in the United Kingdom by Corgi Books in 1977.

A large format tie-in hardback album with photos, stories, and comic strips was published by Stafford Pemberton in 1978. (ISBN 978-0860300571)
