= The Outsiders (Australian TV series) =

- Genre: Adventure
- Starring: Andrew Keir; Sascha Hehn
- Composer: Pat Aulton
- Country of origin: Australia
- Original language: English
- No. of seasons: 1
- No. of episodes: 13

Production
- Executive producer: James Gatward
- Running time: 30

Original release
- Network: ABC Australia
- Release: 9 November 1976 – 1 February 1977

The Outsiders is the name of an Australian-West German co-production which was made in Australia in 1976. It starred Andrew Keir as Charlie Cole and West German actor Sascha Hehn as Pete Jarrett. It also featured other prominent Australian actors including John Jarratt, Wendy Hughes, Leonard Teale, Ray Barrett, Peter Cummins, John Meillon, Megan Williams, John Ewart, Judy Morris, Vincent Ball, Terence Donovan, Serge Lazareff, Peta Toppano, David Gulpilil and Roger Ward. The series was shot in English and Sascha Hehn was dubbed by Australian actor Andrew Harwood. (Hehn dubbed himself in the German version.)

== Plot ==
Charlie Cole and his grandson Pete Jarrett travel around outback Australia in a beaten-up ute, finding itinerant work along the way. In each place they befriend locals and become involved in an adventure, culminating in their solving a mystery, crime or local conflict.

== Cast ==
=== Main ===
- Andrew Keir as Charlie Cole
- Sascha Hehn as Pete Jarrett

=== Other ===
- Andrew Harwood as dubbed voiceover for Sascha Hehn

=== Guests ===
Actor	Role	Eps
Anna Hruby	Denny Gosser	1
Brian Moll	Mertz	1
Cornelia Frances	Mrs Foster	1
David Gulpilil	Billy Potter	1
Diana Perryman	Marilyn	1
Frank Gallacher	Sgt Peter Blakely	1
Hugh Keays-Byrne	Doyle	1
Ivar Kants	Franz Benson	1
John Clayton	Reg McPherson	1
John Ewart	Frank Kennedy	1
John Jarratt	Bobby	1
John Meillon	Bill Picker	1
Joy Hruby	Ella	1
Judy Morris	Karen	1
Ken Goodlet	Police Constable	1
Kevin Miles	Jack Flemming	1
Leonard Teale	Steve	1
Les Foxcroft	Brian	1
Lorna Lesley	Candy	1
Lorrae Desmond	Rose	1
Lynette Curran	Carol	1
Megan Williams	Carol Canning	1
Melissa Jaffer	Betty Kurts	1
Michael Beecher	Clancy	1
Michael Craig	Dicky Draper	1
Paul Chubb	Blue	1
Peta Toppano	Sally Gower	1
Peter Cummins	Mick Dunn	1
Ray Barrett	Harry	1
Roger Ward	Dallas	1
Ron Blanchard	Hannon	1
Serge Lazareff	Brad Fraser	1
Terence Donovan	Stan Frazer	1
Tom Oliver	Artie Fraser	1
Vince Martin	Geoff Murdoch	1
Vincent Ball	Jack Gower	1
Wendy Hughes	Susan Mayfield	1

== Reception ==
The series had a merely mediocre success in Australia but inspired many German spectators because it portrayed Australia in a way that met their expectations at a time when a new wave of German immigrants was about to come. Their reasons were among others: many areas in Germany being relatively overcrowded, high housing costs and Australia's beauty.

== List of episodes ==
1. "Drop Out"
2. "Change of Image"
3. "Ghost Town"
4. "Roustabouts"
5. "Golden Girl"
6. "Rip Off"
7. "Bush Boy"
8. "Bad Dream Town"
9. "Sophie's Mob"
10. "Charlie Cole Esq."
11. "Opal Strike"
12. "Ambush"
13. "Last Campaign"
