= Reifezeugnis =

1977 film

- Screenplay by: Herbert Lichtenfeld
- Directed by: Wolfgang Petersen
- Starring: Klaus Schwarzkopf; Nastassja Kinski; Christian Quadflieg; Judy Winter

Production
- Running time: 108 minutes

Original release
- Release: 27 March 1977

Reifezeugnis is a 1977 German television film directed by Wolfgang Petersen and part of the Tatort television series. The film starred Nastassja Kinski in her first major role in a feature-length film, it was her breakthrough role that made her famous in Germany. It was also an important movie for Wolfgang Petersen's career as a director.

Nastassja Kinski plays Sina, a good-looking 17-year-old schoolgirl, who has a secret affair with her married schoolteacher Helmut Fichte. One of Sina's suitors, Michael, learns about her affair and tries to blackmail her. Sina lures him to the forest, kills him with a stone, and tells a clever fabrication to the police. Still, Kommissar Finke does not trust her story and continues to investigate until the truth is revealed. At the end, he has to stop Sina from killing herself with a gun. Reifezeugnis is considered to be one of the most legendary films of the Tatort series, also because the depicted affair between Sina and her teacher was a major scandal during that time.

The movie was released theatrically in the United States under the title For Your Love Only in 1982.

== Cast ==
- Klaus Schwarzkopf as Kommissar Finke, police inspector
- Nastassja Kinski as Sina Wolf
- Christian Quadflieg as Helmut Fichte
- Judy Winter as Gisela Fichte
- Markus Boysen as Michael Harms
- Rüdiger Kirschstein as Franke, Finke's police assistant
- Petra Verena Milchert as Inge
- Rebecca Völz as Katrin
- Uta Sax as Sina's mother
- Henry Kielmann as Sina's father
- Friedrich Schütter as Dr. Forkmann, school director

== Production ==
In February 2024, Nastassja Kinski demanded an apology for her nude scenes as a 15-year-old in this film.
