= Freddy and the Millionaire =

1961 film

- Directed by: Paul May
- Written by: Arnaldo Genoino
- Produced by: Kurt Hartmann; Eberhard Meichsner
- Starring: Freddy Quinn; Heinz Erhardt; Grit Boettcher
- Cinematography: Kurt Grigoleit
- Edited by: Werner Preuss
- Music by: Lotar Olias
- Production companies: Divina-Film; Cinematografica Lombarda
- Distributed by: Gloria Film
- Release date: 19 December 1961
- Running time: 88 minutes
- Countries: Italy; West Germany
- Language: German

Freddy and the Millionaire (German: Freddy und der Millionär, Italian: La Signorina Miliardo) is a 1961 Italian-West German musical film directed by Paul May and starring Freddy Quinn, Heinz Erhardt and Grit Boettcher.

It was shot at the Baldham Studios in Bavaria and on location in Ischia. The film's sets were designed by the art directors Werner Achmann and Rolf Zehetbauer.

== Cast ==
- Freddy Quinn as Fritz Meyer
- Heinz Erhardt as Präsident John Stone, Millionär
- Grit Boettcher as Edith Schmidt
- Vittoria Prada as Silvia Stone
- Hubert von Meyerinck as Direktor Walloschek
- Peter Vogel as Kunststudent
- Claus Wilcke as Rex
- Joseph Offenbach as Robert, Diener
- Enrico Viarisio as Arzt
- Giustino Durano as Polizist
- Cathrin Heyer as June
- Henry van Lyck as Jellicot, Sekretär
- Gerd Potyka
- Paul Bös
- Harry Hertzsch
- Paul Bürks as van Straaten
- Grethe Weiser as Mrs. Keller
- Betty Curtis
- Ursula Herwig as Silvia Stone (voice)
- Ulla Nielsen as Herself - Singer
- Ulla Richter
- Klaus Schwarzkopf as Polizist (voice)

== Bibliography ==
- Reimer, Robert C.; Reimer, Carol J. (2010). The A to Z of German Cinema. Scarecrow Press. ISBN 978-1-4617-3186-3.
