= Contaminated Man =

- Directed by: Anthony Hickox
- Written by: John Penney
- Produced by: Konstantin Thoeren; Julia Verdin
- Starring: William Hurt; Natascha McElhone; Peter Weller; Katja Woywood; Michael Brandon
- Cinematography: Bruce Douglas Johnson
- Edited by: Liz Webber
- Music by: Michael Hoenig
- Production companies: Promark Entertainment Group; Videal GmbH; UFA GmbH
- Distributed by: DEJ Productions (United States); Sala46 Films (International)
- Release date: 7 September 2000
- Running time: 100 minutes
- Countries: United States; United Kingdom; Germany; Hungary
- Language: English
- Budget: $6 million

Contaminated Man is a 2000 thriller film starring William Hurt, Natascha McElhone, and Peter Weller and directed by Anthony Hickox from a screenplay by John Penney. A co-production of the United States, United Kingdom, Germany, and Hungary and filmed on location in Budapest, the film received mixed-to-negative reviews.

== Cast ==
- William Hurt as David R. Whitman
- Natascha McElhone as Holly Anderson
- Peter Weller as Joseph Müller
- Katja Woywood as Karin Schiffer
- Michael Brandon as Wyles
- Nikolett Barabas as Hunter
- Hendrick Haese as Peck
- Désirée Nosbusch as Kelly Whitman
- Arthur Brauss as Lead Detective
- Christopher Cazenove as President of Clarion
- Hardy Krüger Jr. as Plant Manager
- Thomas Fritsch as Gambler
- Geraldine McEwan as Lilian Rodgers
