= Ein Haus voller Töchter =

German sitcom

- Genre: Sitcom
- Starring: Moritz Lindbergh; Isabella Soric; Marie-Claire Schuller; Irina Kurbanova; Louise Parche; Emma Preisendanz; Grit Boettcher
- Country of origin: Germany
- Original language: German
- No. of seasons: 1
- No. of episodes: 48 (produced); 35 (aired)

Original release
- Network: Das Vierte
- Release: August 19 – October 14, 2010

Ein Haus voller Töchter ("A House Full of Daughters") is a German sitcom which originally aired on Das Vierte in 2010.

== Plot ==
After being left by his wife, family therapist Carsten Vogel (Moritz Lindbergh) has to care for his five daughters on his own, sometimes accompanied by his mother-in-law, Wilhelmine von Funke (Grit Boettcher).

== Production ==
Ein Haus voller Töchter is an adaptation of the popular Russian TV series Папины дочки (Daddy's Daughters). It was the first and only own fictional production of the small private TV channel Das Vierte, which operated from 2005 to 2013. Producer of the series is Dmitry Lesnevskiy. The series was filmed in 2009 and initially announced for September of that year, but after the channel's ownership changed, the first four episodes were finally aired on 19 August 2010. Only 35 of the 48 episodes were ever aired; however, there were continuous reruns of the series until the channel was dissolved on 31 December 2013.

== Critical reception ==
The series was panned for its poor and clichéd writing and its overuse of canned laughter. Jan Schlüter of Quotenmeter.de concluded that "television could hardly get worse".

== See also ==
- List of German television series
