= Nisma Cherrat =

Afro-German actress (born 1969)

- Born: 1 January 1969 (age 57); Casablanca
- Citizenship: Morocco, Germany
- Occupations: Actor, Stage actor, Film actor

Nisma Cherrat (Nisma Bux-Cherrat, born 1969 in Casablanca, Morocco) is an Afro-German actress.

== Life and career ==
She grew up in the Schwarzwald region in Germany and attended 1989 to 1992 the Neue Münchner Schauspielschule. She studied classical singing 1993 to 1995 with Bennie Gillette in Munich and at the Jazzschool München.

Nisma Cherrat is a founding member of the SFD - Schwarze Filmschaffende in Deutschland (Black Artists in German Film) association.

Cherrat was trained at the Schlaffhorst-Andersen school in Bad Nenndorf as teacher for respiratory and speech therapy. Since July 2011 she works for a research project at the Freiburger Institute for Musicians' Medicine of the University of Music in Freiburg, Germany.

== Film and TV work ==
- Warten auf Gott (Series) (1992 ARD)
- Spieglein (2000 Filmhochschule Köln)
- Valley of the Innocent (dir. Branwen Okpako, 2003 ZDF)

== Theatre work (selection) ==
- Skins als Gloria (1992 Kampnagel Kulturfabrik)
- Mephisto als Juliette (1995 Landesbühnen Sachsen)
- Diener zweier Herren als Smeraldina (1995 Landesbühnen Sachsen)
- Hexenjagd als Tituba (1995 Pfalztheater Kaiserslautern)
- Hechinger als Mpenzi (1997 Thalia Theater Hamburg)
- Die Blume von Hawaii als Raka (2000 Staatsschauspiel Dresden)
- Tartuffe als Dorin (2001 See-Burgtheater Schweiz)
- Der Streit als Carise (2002 Stadttheater Bielefeld)
- Hysterikon als Mädchen mit Impuls (2003 Theater Kosmos, Bregenz)
- I have a dream als Coretta King (2004 Tourneetheater Kempf)
- Mephisto als Juliette (2006 Theater Hof)

== Publikation ==
- Mätresse – Wahnsinnige – Hure: Schwarze SchauspielerInnen am deutschsprachigen Theater in Mythen, Masken und Subjekte Kritische Weißseinsforschung in Deutschland (2006, Unrast Verlag) ISBN 978-3-89771-440-3
