= Schwarze Filmschaffende in Deutschland =

SFD - Schwarze Filmschaffende in Deutschland (Black Artists in German Film) is a professional association based in Berlin, Germany for directors, producers, screenwriters, actors and actresses who are Afro-Germans or of African origin and living in Germany.

It was founded in the summer of 2006 and aims to foster a more diverse representation of the lives of black people in German film and television. The founding members of SFD are writers Anne Benza-Madingou and Phillippa Ebénéi, director Winta Yohannes, producer Nataly Kudiabor and Otu Tetteh, and actresses Carol Campbell, Araba Walton, Nisma Cherrat, Ernest Allan Hausmann and Aloysius Itoka. Carol Campbell is the 1. chairperson of SFD.

During the official programme of the Berlinale 2007 the SFD presented a series of six short films called NEUE BILDER (New Perspectives) by Afro-Germans and black filmmakers living in Germany.
