= Der Pfundskerl =

- Starring: Ottfried Fischer; Carol Campbell
- Country of origin: Germany

Der Pfundskerl is a German television series.

== See also ==
- List of German television series
