= Sascha Hehn =

German actor (born 1954)

- Born: 11 October 1954 (age 70); Munich, West Germany
- Occupation(s): Actor, voice artist

Sascha Hehn (born 11 October 1954 in Munich) is a German actor who participated in many feature films, TV shows, modern theatre plays and the dubbing of big international cinema productions (for example "Shrek") for German-speaking audiences.

== Career ==
He worked already successful as an actor while he was still a pupil. Among his many early roles was a great deal of appearances in German feature films (for example Hubertus Castle (1973)).

In 1976 he was "Pete Jarrett", a young man following his grandfather throughout "down under" in the Australian-German TV series The Outsiders.

He was also internationally recognized for portraying Baron Gottfried von Cramm in The Barbara Hutton Story.

He also contributed to the long-lasting success of two German TV shows by belonging to the ensemble of the TV series The Black Forest Clinic (as Dr Udo Brinkmann) and as well as to the cast of Das Traumschiff (steward Viktor).
