= Wartesaal zum kleinen Glück =

- Starring: Grit Boettcher
- Country of origin: Germany

Wartesaal zum kleinen Glück is a German television series.

== See also ==
- List of German television series
