= Ein Bayer auf Rügen =

- Country of origin: Germany

Ein Bayer auf Rügen is a German comedy/crime television series.

== See also ==
- List of German television series
