= Ein verrücktes Paar =

- Starring: Harald Juhnke; Grit Boettcher
- Country of origin: Germany

Ein verrücktes Paar (A crazy couple) is a German TV comedy sketch show series, broadcast on ZDF between 1977 and 1980.

== See also ==
- List of German television series
