= Hotel Paradies =

- A DVD cover of the show
- Created by: Herbert Lichtenfeld
- Starring: Grit Boettcher; Klaus Wildbolz
- Country of origin: Germany
- No. of seasons: 1
- No. of episodes: 27

Production
- Running time: 45 to 52 minutes

Original release
- Network: ZDF
- Release: 16 January – 12 April 1990

Hotel Paradies was a sitcom that aired on ZDF with a total of 27 episodes. It aired twice a week from 16 January 1990 to 12 April 1990, on Tuesdays and Thursdays at 5:50 PM. The show was written by Herbert Lichtenfeld. The director from episodes 1 to 12 was Claus-Peter Witt; he was replaced in episodes 13 to 27 by Michael Günther. The series premiere on 16 January 1990 drew 17.82 million ZDF viewers during prime time.

== Plot ==
A married couple, Max and Lisa Lindemann, run the Hotel Paradies as a family business on the Spanish island of Mallorca, which accommodates primarily German vacationers. Their two sons, Frank, paraplegic since a serious accident, and Michael, a motorcycle enthusiast and heartthrob, assist their parents at the reception, and Grandpa Lindemann also makes himself useful. Among others, the Park Hotel owner, Agostino Kroll, who had to sell the Hotel Paradies to Grandpa Lindemann some time ago due to financial insecurity, provides intrigue. Now wealthy, he wants the prestigious property back at any price.

The series also tells a parallel story of a character named Klaus Feller. In a financial emergency, Feller committed insurance fraud. Together with his then-wife Renate Feller, he faked his death and cashed in the life insurance policy taken out on him, which he consequently shared with Renate. He then went into hiding. Under the false name of Harald Kuhn, Feller now runs a car rental business and repair shop on Mallorca. The situation gets dicey when his ex-wife surprisingly shows up on the island together with her friend Jens Hartmann and Ewald Stronk, a former customer of Klaus Feller, who recognizes Klaus by his voice. To save his own skin, Klaus flees into the mountains to the caveman and hermit, Manfred. Stronk takes up pursuit with one of Klaus's cars but crashes it and has a fatal accident. The search for the culprit becomes a major plot point.

The above situation is aggravated by the character Jens Hartmann, a fanatical diver who, with his girlfriend Renate Feller (the ex-wife of Klaus Feller), is in search of a gold treasure hidden in a shipwreck. After a long time, he discovers the gold, but he lacks the necessary money to salvage it. First, he asks Renate for the money, but she refuses. Afterwards, in his madness, he blackmails her ex-husband, Klaus Feller. Knowing about Renate's past, Hartmann threatens to go to the insurance company and expose Klaus. Klaus then leaves for Rio de Janeiro, Brazil with his new partner Isabel and sells Max Lindemann his car rental business. In the end, Renate gives Hartmann the money for the salvage. Hartmann is killed during the recovery of the gold bars and Renate Feller is remanded in custody. In the course of the conversation with the detective inspector Ramirez, it comes out that Hartmann has taken out a life insurance policy in favor of Renate.

In each episode, there are also one or two additional stories in which the hotel staff are kept on their toes. The additional roles are usually played by high-profile guest stars.

== Episodes ==
- Episode 01 (16 January 1990): Urlaub im Paradies, Teil 1
- Episode 02 (16 January 1990): Urlaub im Paradies, Teil 2 (Kein Grund zur Eifersucht)
- Episode 03 (18 January 1990): Alte Dame, leicht behindert
- Episode 04 (23 January 1990): Oma kommt
- Episode 05 (25 January 1990): Später Frühling
- Episode 06 (30 January 1990): Der Einsiedler
- Episode 07 (1 February 1990): Familienkrieg
- Episode 08 (6 February 1990): Besuch aus der Vergangenheit
- Episode 09 (13 February 1990): Alles nur Theater
- Episode 10 (10 February 1990): Wie du mir, so ich dir
- Episode 11 (15 February 1990): Der Paradiesvogel
- Episode 12 (20 February 1990): Unfallzeugen
- Episode 13 (22 February 1990): Wer war der Täter?
- Episode 14 (27 February 1990): Die Liebe eines Engels
- Episode 15 (1 March 1990): Blumen für Katinka
- Episode 16 (6 March 1990): Rosita kehrt heim
- Episode 17 (8 March 1990): Ein Bild verschwindet
- Episode 18 (13 March 1990): Neuer Lebensmut
- Episode 19 (15 March 1990): Der Schminkkoffer
- Episode 20 (20 March 1990): Zwei sind einer zuviel
- Episode 21 (22 March 1990): Gold
- Episode 22 (27 March 1990): Die Flucht
- Episode 23 (29 March 1990): Das Hochzeitsfoto
- Episode 24 (3 April 1990): Unter Mordverdacht
- Episode 25 (5 April 1990): Ehrlich währt am längsten
- Episode 26 (10 April 1990): Ein Haus für die Zukunft
- Episode 27 (12 April 1990): Abschied von Mallorca

== Cast ==
In at least 3 episodes:

- Karin Frey as Gertrud Stronk
- Ilona Grübel as Evelyn
- Maria Ketikidou as Ines
- Daniela Lohmeyer as Natalie Reizenhein
- Isabel Navarro as maid Carmen
- Caterina Valente as Rosita Kroll
- Irina Wanka as Katinka Neumann
- Alexandra Wilcke as Anna
- Robert Atzorn as Jonas Rowalt
- Roberto Blanco as himself
- Christian Brückner as Commissioner Ramirez
- Fernando Gómez as Mauricio Ortega
- Bob Hirsch as Tommy
- Chris Howland as Butler George
- Diether Krebs as Ewald Stronk
- Walo Lüönd as hotel chef José
- Lutz Mackensy as Axel Gerloff
- Alexander May as the hermit Manfred
- Hans-Christoph Schödel as Bob
- Karl-Heinz Vosgerau as Dr. Andreas Helm

== See also ==
- List of German television series
