= The Black Forest Clinic =

German medical drama television series

- Title card
- Genre: Medical drama
- Written by: Herbert Lichtenfeld
- Directed by: Hans-Jürgen Tögel; Alfred Vohrer
- Starring: Klausjürgen Wussow; Gaby Dohm; Sascha Hehn; Barbara Wussow
- Composer: Hans Hammerschmidt
- Country of origin: West Germany
- Original language: German
- No. of seasons: 3
- No. of episodes: 73

Production
- Producer: Wolfgang Rademann
- Production location: Germany
- Cinematography: Gernot Köhler; Manfred Ensinger; Jürgen R. Schoenemann
- Editors: Heidrun Britta Thomas; Inge P. Drestler; Angelika Sengbusch
- Camera setup: Single-camera
- Running time: 45 minutes

Original release
- Network: ZDF
- Release: October 22, 1985 – March 25, 1989

The Black Forest Clinic (German: Die Schwarzwaldklinik, German pronunciation: [diː ˈʃvaʁtsvaltˌkliːnɪk]) is a German medical drama television series that was produced by and filmed in West Germany. The series was produced between 1984 and 1988 with the original airing being from October 2, 1985, to March 25, 1989, on West Germany's ZDF (Zweites Deutsches Fernsehen) television channel.

The series' storyline follows the inner workings of a small fictional hospital in the Black Forest region of Germany as well as the lives of the Brinkmann family of doctors who work at the hospital.

Shortly after broadcasting had begun in 1985, The Black Forest Clinic became a highly popular television event, reaching audiences of over 20 million viewers. 25 years since its debut, it is still highly regarded in Germany. The series had been re-broadcast several times since 1985 and has spawned two television films released 20 years after its initial airing.

== Background and development ==
The creation of The Black Forest Clinic was influenced by the popularity of the Czechoslovak medical drama series Hospital at the End of the City which originally aired from 1977 to 1981 and was broadcast in both East Germany and West Germany. Actor Klausjürgen Wussow in interviews cited long-running American daytime television drama General Hospital as a major influence on The Black Forest Clinic.

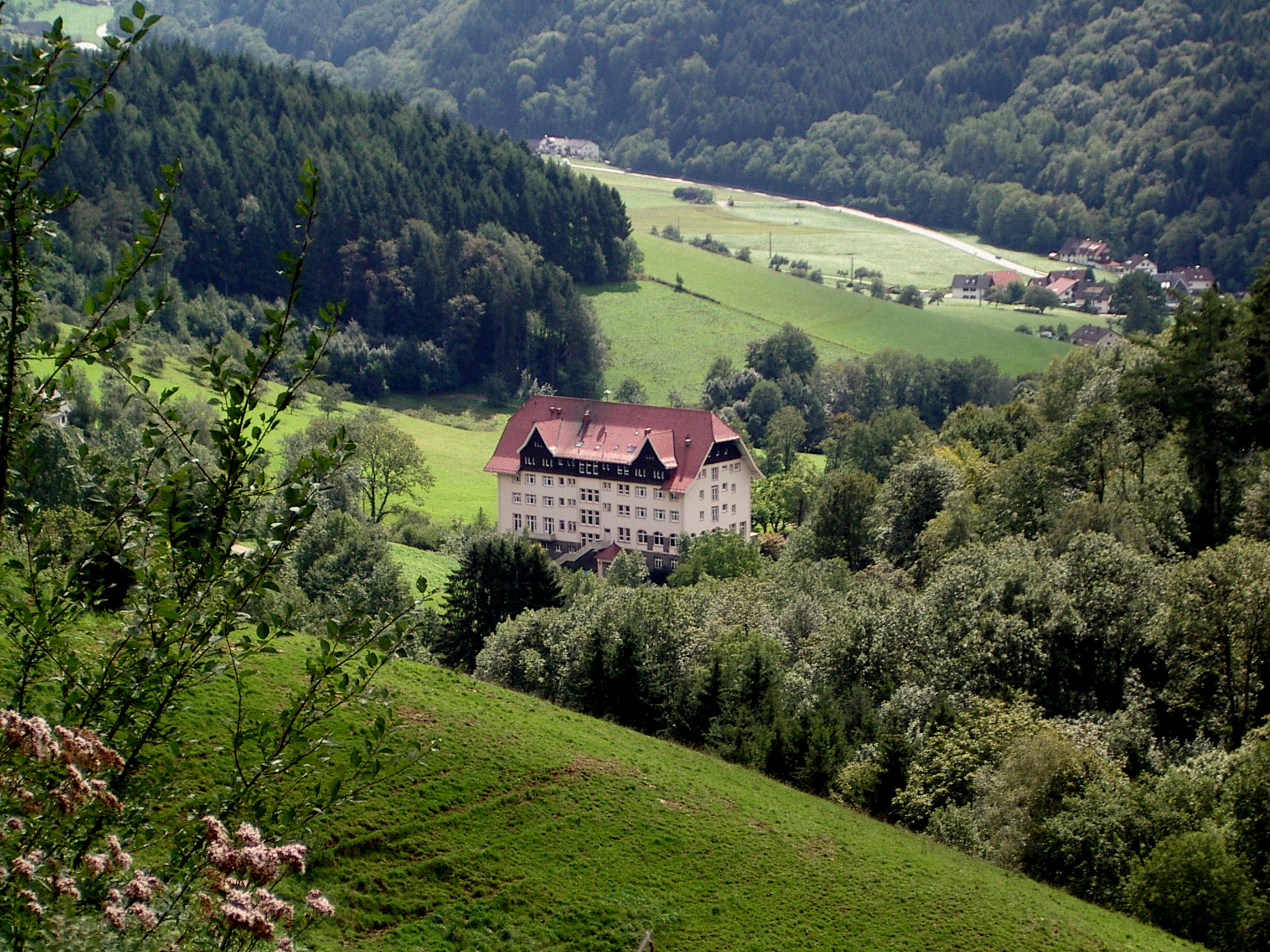
The real-life Glotterbad Clinic in Glottertal served as a set for the fictional Black Forest Clinic.

The setting for the fictional hospital was the real-life Glotterbad Clinic in the town of Glottertal located in the Black Forest of Baden-Württemberg. Only the exterior of the Glotterbad Clinic was photographed and shown in the series, the filming of action inside the hospital was done in a studio in Hamburg. The name for the fictional hospital was borrowed from the location as well — Schwarzwald being the German language name of Black Forest.

The idea for The Black Forest Clinic was conceived by Herbert Lichtenfeld who also wrote the teleplay. The producer of the series was Wolfgang Rademann who had, at that time, been known in Germany as the producer of Das Traumschiff, a German equivalent of The Love Boat. Rademann had for several years attempted to pitch to television networks the idea for a medical television series but with little success due to a lack of interest by the networks.

Principal photography for the series began in the summer of 1984 in Glottertal. Polyphon Film-und Fernsehgesellschaft production company was producing the series for both ZDF and Austrian broadcaster Österreichischer Rundfunk (ORF).

== Reception and viewership ==
The Black Forest Clinic quickly achieved a high level of popularity among its viewers. From the series' debut until 2009, the broadcast of the series had been repeated in Germany seven times in its entirety and the series had also been broadcast in 38 countries. On its official website dedicated to The Black Forest Clinic, ZDF has called the series "the first and most popular German medical drama". In 2008 Süddeutsche Zeitung, Germany's largest circulation daily newspaper, has proclaimed The Black Forest Clinic "the epitome of German television bliss". The Black Forest Clinic is estimated to have had over 20 million regular viewers. The popularity of the series also spawned two television films that were released in 2005 in time for the series' 20th anniversary.

== Cast and characters ==
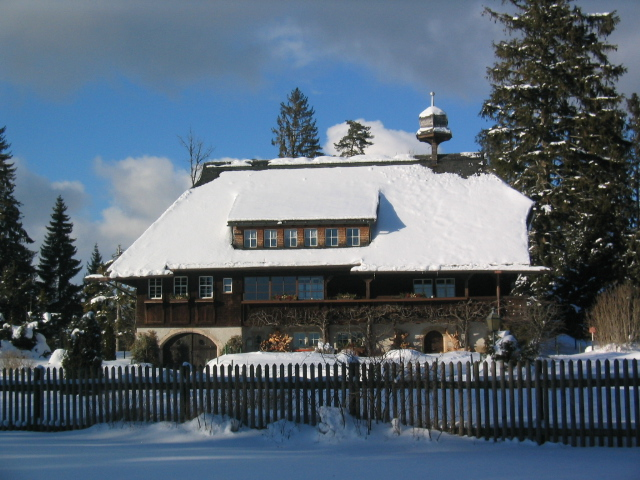
Hüsli museum in Grafenhausen served as the location for Professor Klaus Brinkmann's residence.

- Klausjürgen Wussow — Klaus Brinkmann
- Gaby Dohm — Christa Brinkmann
- Sascha Hehn — Udo Brinkmann
- Barbara Wussow — Elke
- Evelyn Hamann — Carsta Michaelis
- Jochen Schroeder — Mischa
- Eva Maria Bauer — Hildegard
- Alf Marholm — Mühlmann
- Gaby Fischer — Ina
- Karin Eckhold — Mrs Meis
- Horst Naumann — Dr. Römer

== List of episodes ==
List of The Black Forest Clinic episodes

List of episodes
Episode #	Date of original broadcast	Episode title	Notes
Season 1
1	October 22, 1985	"Die Heimkehr" (The Homecoming)	Broadcast in two parts as two consecutive 45-minute-long episodes.
2	October 23, 1985	"Hilfe für einen Mörder" (Help for a Murderer)	
3	October 26, 1985	"Der Weltreisende" (The World Traveler)	
4	October 27, 1985	"Sterbehilfe" (Euthanasia)	
5	November 3, 1985	"Die Entführung" (The Abduction)	
6	November 9, 1985	"Die Wunderquelle" (The Miraculous Spring)	
7	November 17, 1985	"Die Schuldfrage" (The Question of Guilt)	This episode gained 27,970,000 viewers, the all-time highest viewership for any non-football broadcast in Germany.
8	November 23, 1985	"Der Dieb" (The Thief)	
9	December 1, 1985	"Der Kunstfehler" (The Malpractice)	
10	December 7, 1985	"Die Mutprobe" (The Test of Courage)	
11	December 15, 1985	"Vaterschaft" (Paternity)	
12	December 21, 1985	"Die falsche Diagnose" (The Wrong Diagnosis)	
13	January 2, 1986	"Der Versager" (The Failure)	Broadcast in two parts as two consecutive 45-minute-long episodes.
14	January 4, 1986	"Die fromme Lüge" (The White Lie)	
15	January 5, 1986	"Der Mann mit dem Koffer" (The Man with the Suitcase)	
16	January 12, 1986	"Der Wert des Lebens" (The Value of Life)	
17	January 18, 1986	"Hochzeitstag" (Anniversary)	
18	January 26, 1986	"Das Findelkind" (Foundling)	
19	February 1, 1986	"Gewalt im Spiel" (Violence in the Game)	
20	February 9, 1986	"Prost, Herr Professor!" (Cheers, Professor!)	
21	September 30, 1987	"Steinschlag" (Rockfall)	
22	February 15, 1986	"Ein Kind, ein Kind, ein Kind" (A child, a child, a child)	
23	February 23, 1986	"Der Infarkt" (Heart attack)	
Season 2
24	October 3, 1987	"Die Reise nach Amerika" (The Trip to America)	Broadcast in two parts as two consecutive 45-minute-long episodes.
25	October 17, 1987	"Der Fremde in der Hütte" (The Stranger in the Cabin)	
26	October 24, 1987	"Das Geständnis" (The Confession)	
27	October 31, 1987	"Intrigen" (Intrigue)	
28	November 7, 1987	"Spätes Glück" (Late Luck)	
29	November 14, 1987	"Besuch aus Kanada" (Visitors from Canada)	
30	November 21, 1987	"Udos Entschluss" (Udo's decision)	
31	November 28, 1987	"Das Vermächtnis" (The legacy)	
32	December 5, 1987	Die Heimkehr (The Homecoming)	
33	December 19, 1987	"Nackte Tatsache" (Brute fact)	
34	December 26, 1987	"Der Tod der alten Dame" (The death of the old lady)	
35	January 2, 1988	"Die Erbschaft" (The inheritance)	
36	January 9, 1988	"Der Optimist" (The Optimist)	
37	January 16, 1988	"Die Freundin" (Girlfriend)	
38	January 23, 1988	"Glück im Spiel" (Lucky You)	
39	January 30, 1988	"Trennungen" (Separations)	
40	February 6, 1988	"Alles Theater" (Everything Theater)	
41	February 13, 1988	"Wo ist Katharina?" (Where is Katharina?)	
42	February 27, 1988	"Der alte Herr" (The Old Gentleman)	
43	March 5, 1988	"Gewichtsprobleme" (Weight Problems)	
44	March 12, 1988	"Christas schwerster Tag" (Christa's Hardest Day)	
45	March 19, 1988	"Der Tag der glücklichen Paare" (The Day of the Happy Couples)	
46	March 26, 1988	"Carola will nach oben" (Carola Wants Up)	
Season 3
47	October 8, 1988	"Der Anfang vom Ende" (The Beginning of the End)	
48	October 15, 1988	"Wie du mir, so ich dir" (Like you to me, so I to you)	
49	October 22, 1988	"Familienleben" (Family Life)	
50	October 29, 1988	"Hafturlaub" (Parole)	
51	November 5, 1988	"Auf Leben und Tod" (Of Life and death)	
52	November 12, 1988	"Der Quacksalber" (The Quack Doctor)	
53	November 19, 1988	"Arzt zum Nulltarif" (Doctor for Free)	
54	November 26, 1988	"Ein kleiner Teufel" (A Little Devil)	
55	December 3, 1988	"Der kranke Professor" (The Ill Professor)	
56	December 10, 1988	"Udos Konflikt" (Udo's conflict)	
57	December 17, 1988	"Eine starke Frau" (A Strong Woman)	
58	December 31, 1988	"Sorge um Benjamin" (Concern for Benjamin)	
59	January 7, 1989	"Mit Geld geht alles" (With money, anything goes)	
60	January 14, 1989	"Gefahr für Udo" (Risk for Udo)	
61	January 21, 1989	"Der zudringliche Patient" (The Importunate Patient)	
62	January 28, 1989	"Die Rentnerinitiative" (The Pensioners' Initiative)	
63	February 4, 1989	"Herzstillstand" (Cardiac Arrest)	
64	February 11, 1989	"Arzt unter Verdacht" (Doctor Suspected)	
65	February 18, 1989	"Ein Mädchen in Angst" (A Girl in Fear)	
66	February 25, 1989	"Rivalen" (Rivals)	
67	March 4, 1989	"Sturz mit Folgen" (Fall with Impact)	
68	March 11, 1989	"Nierenspende" (Kidney Donation)	
69	March 18, 1989	"Transplantation" (Transplantation)	
70	March 25, 1989	"Hochzeit mit Hindernissen" (Wedding with Obstacles)	
