= Gunter Schoß =

German voice and television actor (born 1940)

Gunter Schoß (born 2 December 1940 in Berlin) is a German voice and television actor.

Among other projects, he was the German voice of Donald Sutherland's character in Pride and Prejudice and of Frank Langella as Merneptah in the 1995 film Moses.
