= Grit Boettcher =

German actress (born 1938)

- Born: 10 August 1938 (age 87); Berlin, Germany
- Occupation: Actress
- Years active: 1958–present

Grit Boettcher (German: [ɡʁɪt ˈbœt.çɐ]; born 10 August 1938) is a German actress.

== Early life ==
In 1938, Boettcher was born in Berlin, Germany.

== Career ==
Boettcher is an actress in various films on German TV and in stage productions. Boettcher is sometimes credited in various spelling as Gritt Boettcher, Britt Böttcher, or Grit Böttcher.

== Personal life ==
Boettcher's second husband is Wolfgang Belstler. Boettcher has two children, Tristan Boettcher and Nicole Belstler-Boettcher.

== Filmography ==
=== Film ===
- As Long as the Heart Still Beats (1958), as Renate Römer
- Twelve Girls and One Man (1959), as Do
- Guitars Sound Softly Through the Night (1959), as Eleanor
- Carnival Confession (1960), as Bertel
- Heaven, Love and Twine (1960), as Susanne Himmel
- Der Teufel hat gut lachen (1960), as Elke
- Freddy and the Millionaire (1961), as Edith Schmidt
- He Can't Stop Doing It (1962), as Berenice
- Liebling, ich muß dich erschießen (1962), as Wirtstochter
- Love Has to Be Learned (1963), as Dora
- The Black Abbot (1963), as Leslie Gine
- Code Name: Jaguar (1965), as Saskia.
- The Monk with the Whip (1967), as Betty Falks.
- Death in the Red Jaguar (1968), as Linda Carp.
- Beyond Control (1968), as Christine.
- Der scharfe Heinrich (1970), as Sabine Müller
- Three Men in the Snow (1974), as Frau Casparius.
- Der WiXXer (2004), as Miss Nora
- 8 Seconds (2015), as Mrs. Lobatski

=== Television ===
- Stahlnetz: Saison (1961, TV series episode), as Gisela Schintzel
- So ein süßes kleines Biest (1964–1965, TV series, 13 episodes), as Georgie
- Das Kriminalmuseum: Der Schlüssel (1964, TV series episode), as Maria
- Die fünfte Kolonne: Ein Auftrag für ... (1966, TV series episode), as Marianne Melzer
- Die Gentlemen bitten zur Kasse (1966, TV miniseries), as Jennifer Donegan
- Der Mann, der keinen Mord beging (1968, TV miniseries), as Marion Klefisch
- Bitte recht freundlich, es wird geschossen (1969, TV film), as Irene Grant
- Ball im Savoy (1971, TV interpretation of operetta by Paul Abraham), as Daisy
- Der Kommissar: Überlegungen eines Mörders (1972, TV series episode), as Erika Taveller
- Bleib wie du bist (1973, TV film), as Johanne Rieth
- Ein verrücktes Paar (1977–1980, TV series, 10 episodes), in various roles
- Leute wie du und ich (1980, TV series, 1 episode), as Mrs. Hauff
- Wasser für die Blumen (1982, TV film), as Rose Torgau
- Höchste Eisenbahn (1987, TV film), as Mrs. Reißenberg
- Wartesaal zum kleinen Glück (1987–1990, TV series, 37 episodes), as Hanni Borgelt
- Hotel Paradies (1989, TV series, 27 episodes), as Lisa Lindemann
- Immer wieder Sonntag (1992–1996, TV series, 31 episodes), as Hilde Sonntag
- Titus und der Fluch der Diamanten (1998, TV film), as Wanda
- Die ProSieben Märchenstunde: Rotkäppchen – Wege zum Glück (2006, TV series episode), as Großmutter
- Das Schneckenhaus (2006, TV film), as Rita Klee
- Unser Kindermädchen ist ein Millionär (2006, TV film), as Martha
- Fünf Sterne (2006–2007, TV series, 27 episodes), as Ottilie Pankratz
- Ein Fall für Nadja (2007, TV series, 6 episodes), as Irmgard Lay
- Im Tal der wilden Rosen: Prüfung des Herzens (2007, TV series episode), as Nora
- SOKO München: Die vergessenen Männer (2008, TV series episode), as Helga Neumann
- Kleine Lüge für die Liebe (2008, TV film), as Emmy
- Ein Haus voller Töchter (2010, TV series, 4 episodes), as Wilhelmina von Funke
- Stuttgart Homicide: Entmündigt (2010, TV series episode), as Herta Pfleiderer
- Hanna – Folge deinem Herzen (2010, TV series, 77 episodes), as Gitti Sommer
- SOKO München: Ungesühnt (2012, TV series episode), as Mrs. Klausen
- Heroes (2013, TV film), as Nellie
- Rosa Roth: Der Schuss (2013, TV series episode), as Ursula Kage

== Bibliography ==
- Bock, Hans-Michael; Bergfelder, Tim, eds. (2009). The Concise Cinegraph: Encyclopaedia of German Cinema. New York: Berghahn Books. ISBN 978-1-57181-655-9.
