= Hubertus Bengsch =

German actor

Hubertus Bengsch (born 10 July 1952 in Berlin) is a German actor, best known for his role as the German First Officer (1WO) in Das Boot. His role in the 1981 film and 1985 serialized long version and director’s cut, is noted for being the only character clearly devoted to Nazism.

Bengsch also played in the series The Country Doctor.

He has been the German voice of American actor Richard Gere since the 1989 film Pretty Woman. In 2017 he received the Synchronsprecherpreis der Stadt Lippstadt for his work as voice actor.

== Filmography ==
=== As actor ===
Year	Title	Role	Notes
1977	Die Ratten		
1981	Das Boot	1st Lieutenant - Number One-1WO	
1983	Das Wagnis des Arnold Janssen		
1985	Das Boot (serialised long version)		
1989-1992	The Country Doctor		TV Series
