= Pfarrer Braun =

German television series

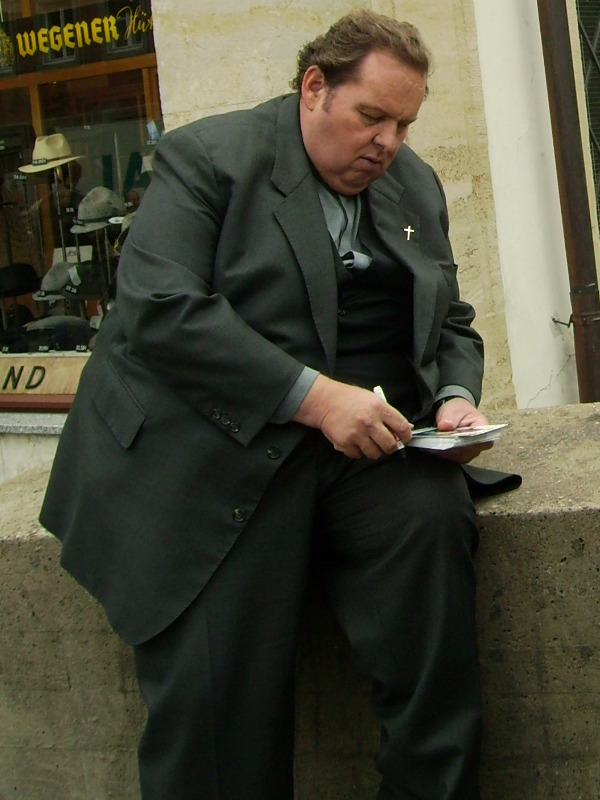
- Ottfried Fischer as Pfarrer Braun
- Created by: Rainer Poelmeyer
- Starring: Ottfried Fischer; Hans-Michael Rehberg; Hansi Jochmann; Gundi Ellert; Peter Heinrich Brix; Gilbert von Sohlern; Antonio Wannek
- Country of origin: Germany
- No. of episodes: 21

Production
- Running time: 90 minutes

Original release
- Release: April 17, 2003 – March 20, 2014

Pfarrer Braun is a German television series. It is based on the character of Father Brown, originally created by G. K. Chesterton. The last episode of the series (Brauns Heimkehr) was produced in 2013 and aired on March 20, 2014. The reason for discontinuing the series was star Ottfried Fischer's advancing health problems, as the production company announced in May 2013.

== Plot ==
Time and time again, the Catholic priest Guido Braun succumbs to the temptation to investigate a case, which usually results in a punitive transfer to a new plot location for the next episode - his bishop Hemmelrath has forbidden him from investigating. As soon as Braun sees an injustice, he wants to put an end to it, defying the explicit prohibition of his bishop. In sometimes not quite kosher ways, he contributes to the solution of the case with the support of his sacristan Armin Knopp, his housekeeper Margot Roßhauptner and the clumsy inspector Albin Geiger.

== Main characters ==
The Roman Catholic priest Guido Braun - despite the explicit prohibition by his bishop Hemmelrath - cannot refrain from taking care of mysterious deaths in his respective parish of service. All too often, however, these turn out to be insidious murders - and because of the public attention they attract, Braun is punitively transferred by his superior to a supposedly quiet neighborhood every two or three episodes or so, but never to his beloved Bavarian fatherland. While "criminalizing" - as the bishop says - the priest more or less forcibly clashes with the respective police "authority", mostly in the person of the good-natured and slightly simple-minded chief inspector Geiger, who is also frequently transferred due to his "successes", happens to hold seminars on location, takes vacation or has to provide administrative assistance for his colleagues. In the final episode, Braun learns that he is suffering from a terminal illness. After solving the case, he dies during the service in Rome.

Margot Roßhauptner, affectionately called "the Roßhauptnerin" by Braun, is the priest's Berlinese housekeeper and always comments jauntily on Braun's goings-on (until episode 20). On the one hand, she tries to prevent Braun from criminalizing, because she fears the inevitable transfer and the resulting move, on the other hand, she often supports Braun's criminalizing through undercover activities. A kind of running gag is her risky fast way of driving.

Armin Knopp is the priest's sacristan. In the first episode, Braun, as a prison chaplain in a Hamburg prison, is able to exonerate him of unjustified charges and thus obtain his early release on parole from the penal system; from that point on, he is his companion and aide. He falls in love anew in almost every episode, but is always pursued by the misfortune of love. In prison he learned various tricks which help Braun from time to time. For example, he is capable of opening any kind of locks, has mastered sign language and is skilled in martial arts.

Chief Inspector Albin Geiger is almost always punitively transferred to the vicinity of the priest by chance. He is usually ex officio in charge of the criminal cases which Braun gets involved in. However, it soon becomes clear why he, too, must keep changing his place of duty: He acts too stupid for the task assigned to him, a "curse" for the priest. Since the third episode, one can see that Braun and Geiger effectively form an alliance of convenience. Braun uses the police capabilities such as personal information, expert opinions or DNA analysis and Geiger uses Braun's criminological capabilities, because the commissioner secretly hopes for a promotion, which he also gets from episode 13 and is promoted to the LKA.

Bishop Sebastian Hemmelrath is Braun's boss. He is God-fearing, but always looking out for the church's (and his own) advantage, though not particularly well-versed in the Bible. While he always forbids the pastor to "criminalize", he likes to bet with him, but when he loses, he tries to get out of his bet. He hopes for an early appointment to Rome, but fails several times for a variety of reasons. In the final episode, he is finally made a cardinal.

Monsignore Anselm Mühlich, the secretary of Bishop Hemmelrath, turns out to be Braun's adversary, trying to intrigue wherever he can - and often getting the short end of the stick. He is also the one who - whenever Hemmelrath and Braun bet on who knows a Bible passage - tries to reveal it to the bishop. Mühlich can also score occasionally against Braun, but ultimately loses. In the episode "Grimms Mördchen", however, Mühlich relies on Braun's criminological skills because he fears that he himself will become the victim of an assassination attempt.

== Episodes ==
Nr.	Original title	Translated Title	Plot	First Aired	Director	Script
1	Der siebte Tempel	The seventh temple	Pfarrer Braun is transferred to Hamburg as a prison chaplain after making the headlines through criminal investigations. As a pastor, he gets to know the imprisoned youth Armin Knopp. Braun succeeds in proving the boy's partial innocence and obtaining his early release on parole by somewhat wet blanketing the obligation in the confessional to an inmate. As a result of this new investigation, Braun's next punitive transfer promptly follows, this time to Nordersand, a fictional North Sea island. Braun, his housekeeper Margot Roßhauptner and Armin as an altar boy take over a small Catholic parish. Braun's superior Bishop Hemmelrath wants to keep him away from the crime of the big city. But even in the deepest province, Braun encounters mysterious occurrences. When the wealthy widow Gronewold, for whose deceased husband Braun read a Latin mass in exchange for "active charity" not quite according to church law, died unexpectedly, Braun was able to prove that, among others, a Dr. Hermann Teusch wanted to obtain the widow's inheritance by fraud.	17. Apr. 2003	Martin Gies	Wolfgang Limmer
2	Das Skelett in den Dünen	The skeleton in the dunes	The second episode, like the first case The Seventh Temple, is set on the North Sea island. On the beach, Geiger's son - the local police chief - discovers a skeleton representing the remains of the artist Wigbert Münzing. The only strange thing is that the latter seems to be still living to the fullest. Finally, Braun is able to prove that Onno, a homeless man, has a second existence.	25. Apr. 2003	Martin Gies	Wolfgang Limmer
3	Ein verhexter Fall	A bewitched case	After his investigations, which are once again forbidden, Braun is now punitively transferred to the Harz Mountains. There he has to contend with the ecumenism-loving pastor Happe, whose "hip" manner steals the pastor's nerves. In addition, Bishop Hemmelrath has forced a vow on his problem pastor Braun not to "criminalize" anymore, but he soon has to break this vow again. New findings emerge in a murder case that was already thought to have been solved. A teacher named Rinke was murdered and the deaf student Antonia, who confessed to the murder, is in custody as the perpetrator, but her boyfriend Winfried claims he is the real culprit. With the help of two laid-out pig heads and their insect infestation, Pastor Braun is able to prove that, contrary to the witnesses' statements, Rinke was not murdered on the Brocken, but in his house. This evidence leads to the real murderer.	15. Apr. 2004	Dirk Regel	Wolfgang Limmer
4	Der Fluch der Pröpstin	The curse of the provost	Braun continues to be in the Harz Mountains. A restorer named Manuel Castelnuovo becomes the priest's friend when he discovers his secret feasting cellar next to the room where Castelnuovo is restoring the tomb of Friederike, the provost. When Castelnuovo's dog and the latter himself die mysteriously, Father Braun determines that his friend not only had many lovers, but that there were also some enemies of the restorer. One or another must have spread dangerous fungal spores that led to the death of the gigolo.	22. Apr. 2004	Dirk Regel	Wolfgang Limmer
5	Bruder Mord	Brother murder	After Braun had tried in vain to lose weight in the Harz mountains, this time Hemmelrath sends Braun to a Rhenish monastery surrounded by a moat for a fasting cure. There, Armin, who supplies Braun with sausages and meat by boat, finds the dead Father Boniface. According to Abbot Nicodemus, he had killed himself. But Father Pankraz also dies, both had to do with translations of texts that prove that the papacy does not go back to Peter and thus has no basis. The abbot wanted to cover up this explosive issue. Braun has to "criminalize" in a monastery without electricity and internet - and for the first time with the permission of the bishop.	31. March 2005	Dirk Regel	Hans-Jörg Bruckner
6	Adel vernichtet	Nobility destroyed	At Falkenberg Castle on the Rhine, a falcon is robbed of its tail feathers and thus disfigured. The Baron of Falkenberg has to kill him, someone seems to have it in for the Falkenberg family. But all enemies from the Middle Ages and their descendants seem to be extinct. Between wine festivals, a noble family marked by the death of their mother and the autumnal Rhine landscape, Braun comes across gardener Karl Rabe, with whom something more than just his name seems to be wrong.	14. Apr. 2005	Dirk Regel	Hans-Jörg Bruckner
7	Der unsichtbare Beweis	The invisible proof	Monsignor Mühlich, the bishop's secretary, recommends that Father Braun be transferred to Pfaffenberg in the Saxon province. But the coziness there is soon over when streams of tourists want to photograph the small church and the rectory several times a day. During a wedding celebration, the tour guide Rosa is murdered. Her (ex-)boyfriend Matej, under urgent suspicion of the crime, asks Pastor Braun for church asylum as the angry guests of the celebration pursue him. Inspector Geiger, who happens to be undergoing survival training in the Elbe Sandstone Mountains, is finally able to help decisively in this case.	14. Sep. 2006	Ulrich Stark	Arndt Stüwe
8	Drei Särge und ein Baby	Three coffins and a baby	The shipowner Susanna Vogelsang is said to have put her two ex-husbands in the grave, which makes Braun curious when the third husband also dies an unnatural death on the night of the first wedding anniversary. At the same time, the baby of a young Czech woman sees the light of day in Braun's bed. Bishop Hemmelrath is horrified because, during a visit to the rectory, he mistakenly assumes that Pastor Braun and his housekeeper Roßhauptner are the parents. Pastor Braun clarifies the past of the shipowner, who after the third death is subjected to a vehement gauntlet in the village (mainly starting from the mother of her first husband) and now alternately receives very personal encouragement from two honorable gentlemen, the local funeral director Graf and the pathologist Dr. Storz.	21. Sep. 2006	Wolfgang F. Henschel	Cornelia Willinger Stephan Reichenberger
9	Kein Sterbenswörtchen	Not a word	Through an inheritance, the Catholic official church would receive five million euros if Braun took over a parish in Liebwitz, Saxony. Braun would use the money to buy one of the Protestant churches at auction and convert it into a Catholic place of worship. But the building is entirely in the interest of Mayor Herrgesell, who wants to turn it into a fire station. She knows how to turn the formerly socialist hamlet against Braun. In this chaos, Braun finds out that a deceased Friedrich Dobertin, husband of the testatrix, was a cosmonaut during his lifetime, later a lottery millionaire and amateur actor. In front of all the audience, he died on stage of an actual heart attack - coincidentally during his death scene. Besides Dobertin, the present mayor, the suspicious bank director Renate Ziese and likewise the attractive Carmen Schneider, Dobertin's lover, were on stage. Each had a motive, only Braun can determine the murderer. He first investigates the question of where the lottery millions have gone and why Liebwitz suddenly got so many new hotels.	28. Sep. 2006	Wolfgang F. Henschel	Hans-Jörg Bruckner
10	Ein Zeichen Gottes	A sign from God	Braun is transferred again. This time, the bishop and especially Mühlich set the clergyman a particularly difficult task. Braun has to go to Franconia, which he spurns as Upper Bavaria. When Braun cannot compete with the Catholic doctrine against a local miracle apparition in the small town of Kursdorf, he decides to investigate the matter. In the process, he discovers the dead local reporter of the village. Inspector Geiger and his recalcitrant mother are also on vacation in the village and he quickly takes over the supervision of the murder investigation in order to escape his mother at least temporarily. In solving this case, Braun must contend with sophisticated devotional traders and a local resident who acts as a lay preacher. Bishop Hemmelrath also sees the "miracle" as an opportunity to gain promotion to Rome with an approving report about it. Braun, however, exposes the supposed "miracle" as a hoax and Hemmelrath is disgraced before the Vatican.	29. March 2007	Wolfgang F. Henschel	Arndt Stüwe
11	Das Erbe von Junkersdorf	The heritage of Junkersdorf	Countess Marietta von Junkersdorf is dying and, shortly before her death, wants to marry her childhood sweetheart Max in church to deprive the relatives of their inheritance. After the wedding ceremony, the janitor falls from the tower of the estate. A frenzy for the inheritance begins, under whose spell the nurse also seems to have fallen. Max, the castle's servant and the countess's longtime lover, falls down a staircase that someone has intentionally iced over and dies. The relatives become more and more suspicious. To make matters worse, Hemmelrath and Mühlich interfere in the inheritance case. They learn that a bishop named Ackermann is also interested in the castle. The Roßhauptnerin has also inherited and has to fight with her stepsister over a farm whose value seems to be higher than the sister wants to admit.	5. Apr. 2007	Wolfgang F. Henschel	Cornelia Willinger Stephan Reichenberger
12	Braun unter Verdacht	Brown under suspicion	Braun is supposed to accompany the novices' pledge of allegiance (perpetual profession) in a nunnery, but it seems that something is amiss in the convent. At night, the private detective Hermann Rammstet is murdered. Braun is the first to discover the body and is mistaken for the murderer. He is released only on bail paid by the church. To get the money back in any case, Hemmelrath allows the pastor to "criminalize" him. The murdered detective had opened files on some nuns. So the Rosshauptner sneaks into the convent for further investigations and, after discovering a secret passage, Braun gets on the trail of a long-ago unsolved murder case.	12. Apr. 2007	Axel de Roche	Arndt Stüwe
13	Die Gärten des Rabbiners	The rabbi's gardens	Braun's new community is located near a Jewish community in Potsdam. A journeyman of a nursery dies in a murder in the synagogue. Geiger suspects Rabbi Seelig. Braun, however, investigates that two gardening companies were fighting over the rights to plant the Sanssouci palace park. Son and daughter from both gardening families secretly love each other and Braun wants to bring about a reconciliation. In the process, he discovers that the murdered man has grown a sensational flower bulb. This episode takes a look into Jewish culture and faith traditions.	3. Apr. 2008	Wolfgang F. Henschel	Hartmut Block
14	Heiliger Birnbaum	Holy pear tree	To prevent Pfarrer Braun from disrupting Bishop Hemmelrath's upcoming appointment as cardinal, the bishop transfers him to the deeply Protestant Ribbeck in Havelland. There, in the tourism craze, pear pieces are served at communion. Theodor Fontane's poem about the pear tree is set in Ribbeck. The Lutheran pastor Lehmkuhl collapses dead shortly after Braun's arrival at the evening service; a pear piece had apparently been poisoned. In addition, the tree stump that remains of the original pear tree in Fontane's poem, which was on display in the Ribbeck village church, disappears. A suspicious hotelier wanted the tree stump as an attraction for his hotel; but a pharmacist was also interested in the tree in order to genetically reconstruct it. Geiger suspects the pastor's mother, but she also dies a short time later. Pastor Braun investigates a crime with a deeply Protestant background.	10. Apr. 2008	Wolfgang F. Henschel	Cornelia Willinger Stephan Reichenberger
15	Im Namen von Rose	In the name of Rose	Braun now lands in Saarland. After the death of her husband, former communist Rose Assmann returns from exile to St. Florian and lies at anchor with her luxury houseboat "Richelieu". No sooner does Braun anchor next to Rose with his modest houseboat "Jeanne d'Arc" than he and altar boy Armin fish the old wine merchant Konz out of the water, dead, because the rectory is not yet ready for occupancy due to the danger of collapse. Parts of this episode were filmed in Saarburg, which is not in Saarland, but in Rhineland-Palatinate. The episode title refers to the historical novel The Name of the Rose by Umberto Eco, published in 1980, in which the Franciscan priest William von Baskerville, who also "criminalizes," is supposed to solve several murders in a northern Italian Benedictine abbey on an official mission.	9. Apr. 2009	Wolfgang F. Henschel	Cornelia Willinger Stephan Reichenberger
16	Glück auf! Der Mörder kommt!	Good luck! The murderer is comin!	Braun can now move into the renovated rectory in St. Florian, Saarland. A pigeon house in the garden makes for dirt and noise. The first floor of the rectory serves as a rehearsal room for the "Saar-Palomas," the miners' choir that takes care of a dozen carrier pigeons - the legacy of Braun's predecessor. When choir member Adolf Zwickel falls off the ladder under strange circumstances and breaks his neck, Braun has to "criminalize" again.	16. Apr. 2009	Wolfgang F. Henschel	Cornelia Willinger Stephan Reichenberger
17	Schwein gehabt!	Lucky!	Also on his latest assignment, on the island of Usedom, Pfarrer Braun has to deal with murder: The pig farmer Karl Gützkow dies in a faked hunting accident. But the case is more entangled than initially suspected.	1. Apr. 2010	Wolfgang F. Henschel	Ralf Kinder
18	Kur mit Schatten	Cure with shadow	Billionaire Christa Menges is staying at the Grandhotel Ahlbeck on Usedom for a cure. As a Catholic, she therefore belongs to Braun's congregation. Christa Menges has fallen madly and passionately in love with the Lithuanian bon vivant Wiktor, but he unseemly relieves her of five million euros. Shortly thereafter, the Rosshauptner finds Wiktor lying dead in the hotel's whirlpool tub and Christa Menges is blackmailed. Pastor Braun makes his usual active effort to clarify the situation. This time, Chief Inspector Geiger, who is standing by his side, receives involuntary assistance from Polish colleagues. At the same time, Braun has to deal with the violent death of a young local petty criminal and is approached by Bishop Hemmelrath to persuade Christa Menges to donate half a million euros to the Catholic Church.	8. Apr. 2010	Wolfgang F. Henschel	Cornelia Willinger Stephan Reichenberger
19	Grimms Mördchen	Grimm's little murderer	Monsignor Mühlich has a school friend, Father Hummel from Kassel. When he finds him dead, he appoints Father Braun as Hummel's successor because he does not believe in a natural death. Mühlich and Hummel were participants in a Snow White performance at the end of the 1970s. Suddenly, the mortality rate of the dwarf actors at the time is unusually high. Father Braun is now allowed to investigate with permission, for once.	21. Oct. 2010	Wolfgang F. Henschel	Cornelia Willinger Stephan Reichenberger
20	Altes Geld, junges Blut	Old money, young blood	Pfarrer Braun is transferred to his beloved Upper Bavaria and, in order to avoid another punitive transfer, no longer wants to investigate. However, he is soon put on the trail of a missing financial advisor by Bishop Hemmelrath, who is found murdered a short time later. Braun learns that Hemmelrath wanted to use the dead man to increase church donations, and the money has now disappeared.	17. Feb. 2011	Wolfgang F. Henschel	Cornelia Willinger
21	Ausgegeigt!	Fagged out!	Bishop Hemmelrath lends a Stradivarius violin from church property to a young musician. When the valuable piece is stolen, he commissions Pastor Braun to recover it. Shortly afterwards, the musician is murdered, and Inspector Geiger investigates.	10. May 2012	Jürgen Bretzinger	Cornelia Willinger
22	Brauns Heimkehr	Braun's homecoming	Pfarrer Braun learns that he is terminally ill and informs Bishop Hemmelrath of this. At his request, Braun returns to his birthplace, Bad Beuern. It seems strange to him that on the way there, a pregnant sheep is driven in front of his car and the young shepherdess insistently offers to emergency-slaughter the animal. The priest realizes that even in the face of death he has to criminalize once again. Fortunately, Inspector Geiger happens to be spending his cure in Bad Beuern. The two join forces one last time to solve a crime. The entanglements of a paper mill owner who beats his wife and who is the father of the young shepherdess, as well as a monastery where two monks each have their thumbs cut off while working on a mysterious assignment, in dubious efforts to canonize a childhood friend of Braun's even lead the inspector and the priest to the Vatican, where Bishop Hemmelrath finally receives his cardinal's hat. During the mass, Braun unmasks the culprit and dies.	20. March 2014	Wolfgang F. Henschel	Wolfgang Limmer

== See also ==
- List of German television series
