= Drehkreuz Airport =

- Country of origin: Germany

Drehkreuz Airport is a German television series.

== See also ==
- List of German television series
