= Christian Quadflieg =

German actor (1945–2023)

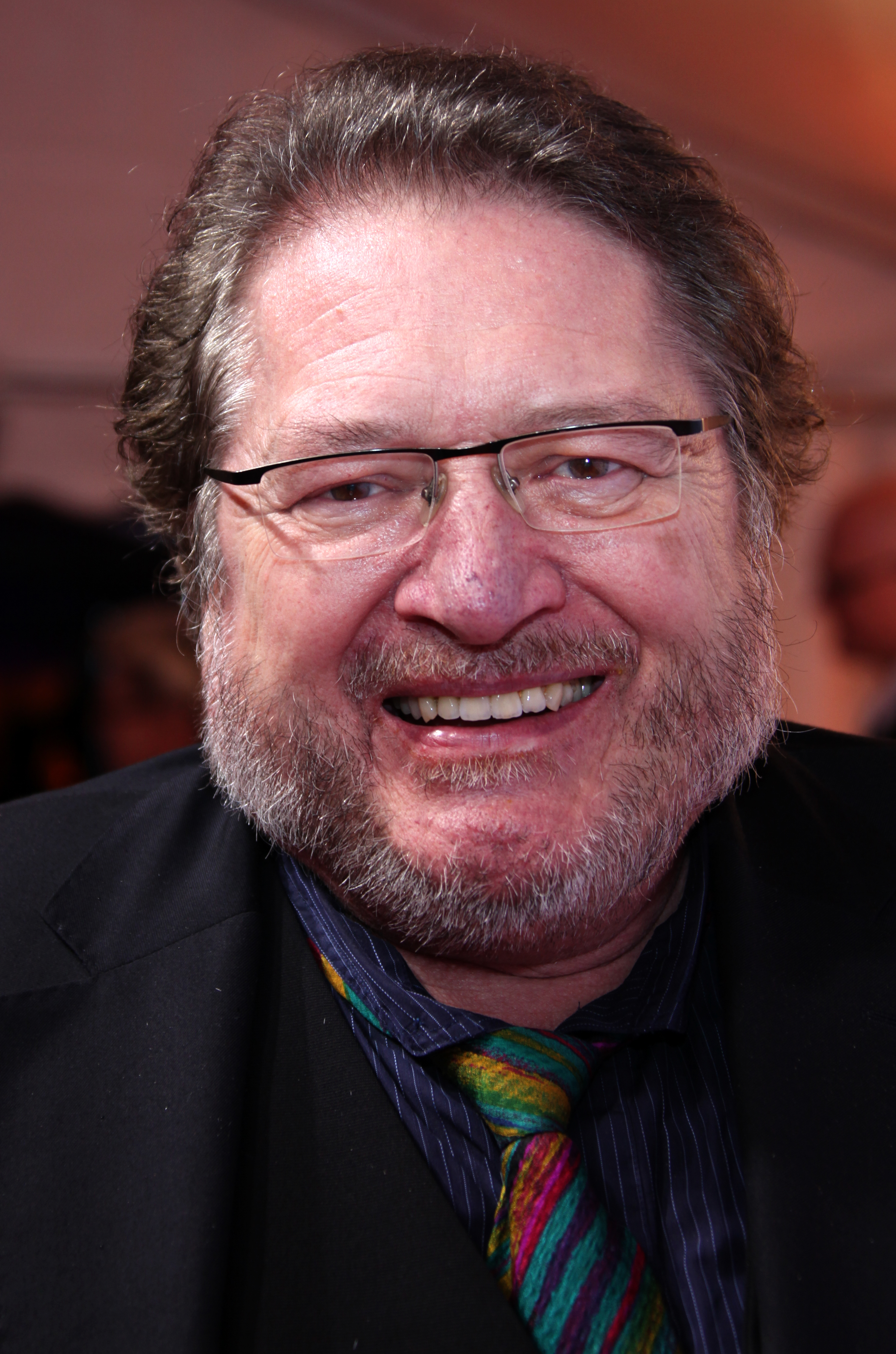
- Quadflieg in 2012
- Born: Christian Urs Quadflieg; 11 April 1945; Växjö, Sweden
- Died: 16 July 2023 (aged 78); Hamburg, Germany
- Other name: Christian Urs
- Website: christianquadflieg.de

Christian Urs Quadflieg (German: [ˈkʁɪsti̯a(ː)n ˈʔʊʁs ˈkvatfliːk]; 11 April 1945 – 16 July 2023) was a German-Swedish actor and television director. After working at various theatres, he became a freelance actor from 1974 onwards. He had his breakthrough on television in 1977 in the episode Reifezeugnis from the Tatort series. He had roles in many popular television series, namely the title role in Der Landarzt, which he played for 42 episodes from 1987 to 1992.

== Life and career ==
Quadflieg was born in Växjö, Sweden, on 11 April 1945, one of five children. His father was the German actor Will Quadflieg, who had played Faust opposite Gustaf Gründgens. His mother was Benita von Vegesack, a Swedish countess. He grew up in Hamburg, where he completed school with the Abitur. He began a three-years education to be an actor at the Westfälische Schauspielschule Bochum, where his application had been refused initially. Between 1969 and 1973 he was a member of theatre companies in Oberhausen, Wuppertal and Basel.

=== Theatre ===
From 1974 he worked as freelance actor, playing at the Thalia Theater in Hamburg and the Volksbühne in Berlin, in Munich, Vienna and Zürich. His classical roles included both the title role and Marquis Posa in Schiller's Don Carlos, Ferdinand in Kabale und Liebe, Karl Moor in Die Räuber, Musset's Lorenzaccio, the male lead in Strindberg's Fräulein Julie, and Sky in Guys and Dolls. He played in Büchner's Dantons Tod at the 1981 Salzburg Festival.

=== Television ===
In 1975, Quadflieg appeared in the science-fiction series Star Maidens, a British-German production that aired in 1976. In 1977, Quadflieg had his career breakthrough in Reifezeugnis, an episode from the Tatort series, playing a teacher who has an affair with a student, portrayed by Nastassja Kinski. He then had roles in many popular television series, including Der Alte, Derrick, Das Traumschiff, Siska and Ein Fall für zwei. In Vater wider Willen he played a conductor. He portrayed the title role of Dr. Karsten Matthiesen in the series Der Landarzt in 42 episodes from 1987 to 1992. In several of these episodes he also worked as director.

=== Later years ===
Quadflieg later toured Germany regularly with programmes of reading the work of various poets, such as Eduard Mörike, Heinrich Heine and Erich Kästner. He also recorded audio books. He was the German voice of, among others, Dean Stockwell in Paris, Texas, Robert Taylor in Broadway Melody of 1936 and The Crowd Roars. He was seen less on television, arguing that he searched for better quality roles.

=== Personal life ===
Quadflieg was married to the actress Renate Reger, who also played in Der Landarzt. During his time in Oberhausen, he worked under the name Christian Urs as he did not want to profit from the fame of his father Will Quadflieg, who was born and raised in Oberhausen. The family later lived in Hamburg.

Christian Quadflieg died in Hamburg, after a long serious illness, on 16 July 2023, at age 78.

== Filmography ==
Christian Quadflieg's filmography included:

- Die unfreiwilligen Reisen des Moritz August Benjowski (1974, TV miniseries)
- Abenteuerlicher Simplizissimus (1975, TV miniseries)
- Star Maidens (1976, TV series)
- Tatort – Reifezeugnis (1977, TV)
- Derrick – season 5, episode 7: Kaffee mit Beate (1978, TV)
- Derrick – season 6, episode 12: Ein Todesengel (1979, TV)
- Derrick – season 7, episode 9: Zeuge Yuroski (1980, TV)
- Der Landarzt (1987–1992, TV series)
- Vater wider Willen (1995–2002, TV series)
