= The Country Doctor (TV series) =

- Created by: Herbert Lichtenfeld
- Starring: Christian Quadflieg; Walter Plathe; Wayne Carpendale
- Country of origin: Germany
- No. of seasons: 22

Original release
- Network: ZDF
- Release: 10 February 1987 – 17 May 2013

Der Landarzt is a German television series that aired for 22 seasons from 1987 to 2013.

During early seasons, the show revolves around the Landarzt, country doctor, Dr. Karsten Matthiesen who runs a practice in his Northern German hometown of Deekelsen with the help of his mother Olga.

In season 5, after Karsten has died in an accident, Dr. Uli Teschner succeeds him, until being replaced by Dr. Jan Bergmann in season 18.

== Cast ==
- Christian Quadflieg as Dr. Karsten Mattiesen, der Landarzt (1987–1992)
- Walter Plathe as Dr. Ulrich Teschner, der Landarzt (1992–2009)
- Wayne Carpendale as Dr. Jan Bergmann, der Landarzt (2009–2013)
- Gila von Weitershausen as Annemarie Mattiesen (1987–1995)
- Antje Weisgerber as Olga Mattiesen (1987–1999)
- Heinz Reincke as Eckholm (1987–2010)
- Gerhard Olschewski as Hinnerksen (1987–2013)
- Gert Haucke as Bruno Hanusch (1987–2004)
- Hubertus Bengsch as Dr. Peter Detlefsen (season 2 to 4)

== See also ==
- List of German television series
