= Vater wider Willen =

German television series

- Genre: Family drama
- Starring: Christian Quadflieg; Suzanne von Borsody; Anna Schmidt; Rita Lengyel; Nina Bagusat; Marita Marschall; Miguel Molina; Constantin Gastmann
- Country of origin: Germany
- Original language: German
- No. of seasons: 2
- No. of specials: 3

Production
- Running time: 45–50 minutes

Original release
- Network: Das Erste
- Release: 1995 – 2002

Vater wider Willen is a German family drama television series broadcast on Das Erste from 1995 to 2002. It consists of three pilot films and two seasons of 13 episodes each.

== Synopsis ==
Successful conductor Max takes over the South German Symphony, whose chief conductor has recently died of a heart attack. He subsequently gets a visit from his ex-wife, Ingrid. She is a paleontologist and has received a research assignment in the Andes. She wants Max to bring their three daughters, Gitti, Beatrice, and Marlene, to South America; he does so reluctantly.

Various unexpected events ensue. Marlene gets involved with a religious sect, Beatrice quits her medical studies to become a paramedic, and Gitti has kidney failure.

Max meets Helen, an American soprano, and they begin to date. Helen has two adoptive sons, Henry and William. William's birth mother starts a custody battle, Henry experiments with drugs, and eventually, the two brothers try to run away from home when they become convinced that Max wants to send them to boarding school.

== Cast and characters ==
- Christian Quadflieg as Max
- Suzanne von Borsody as Ingrid
- Anna Schmidt as Gitti
- Rita Lengyel as Beatrice
- Nina Bagusat as Marlene
- Marita Marschall as Helen
- Miguel Molina as Henry
- Constantin Gastmann as William

== See also ==
- List of German television series
