= Das Traumschiff =

German television series

- Genre: Soap opera
- Starring: Heinz Weiss (1981–1999); Siegfried Rauch (1999–2014); Sascha Hehn (2014–2018); Florian Silbereisen (2019–present)
- Countries of origin: West Germany (1981–1990); Germany (1990–present)
- No. of episodes: 108

Production
- Executive producer: Wolfgang Rademann
- Running time: 90 minutes

Original release
- Network: ZDF
- Release: November 22, 1981 – present

Das Traumschiff ("The Dream Ship") is a German television drama series by ZDF. The series, about a cruise ship that travels to places around the world, debuted in 1981 and became one of the most-watched television shows in Germany. As of 2024, more than 100 episodes have been produced. It was primarily filmed and set aboard the MS Deutschland cruise ship as it sailed to tourist destinations around the world. The destinations depicted are usually the result of product placement. In 2015, the depicted ship was switched to the MS Amadea. The television producer is Wolfgang Rademann.

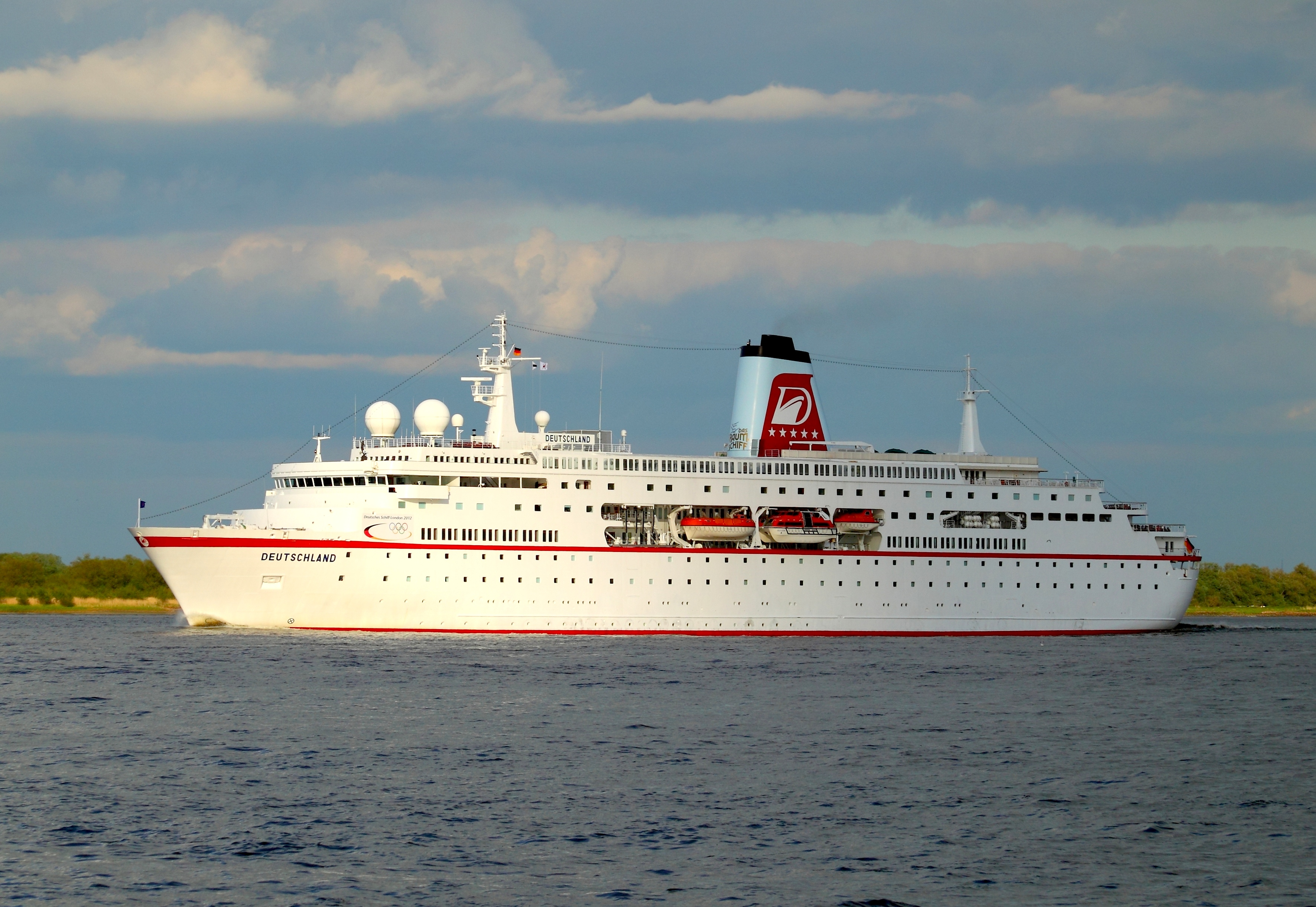
MS Deutschland, the cruise ship on which the series was set between 1999 and 2015

In 2007, a Variety magazine article described the series as a '"Love Boat"-like cruise liner skein.'

== Forerunner ==
The series repeated some clichés that had already successfully been used in Heinz Rühmann's feature film The Captain, which had been based on Richard Gordon's novel The Captain's Table. Romances excluded, the films are reminiscent of the times when sea voyages were more affordable and safer than air travel, at the turn of the 19th century.

== Premise ==
The premise of the series resembled the American TV series The Love Boat. It presented a place where all kinds of people appeared as guests and could hereby show a variety of extraordinary characters, fates, schemes and relationships. Guests either brought their problems with them or just got into trouble by encountering folks they would not have met under normal circumstances. Still, everything would lead to a happy-end in each episode.

== Actors ==
Captain Heinz Hansen was played by Heinz Weiss who in younger years had been successful on the silver screen as Jerry Cotton's best friend and colleague Phil Decker. When Weiss left the character of Hansen in 1999, he was replaced by Captain Jakob Paulsen, played by Siegfried Rauch. Rauch left the series in 2014 and was followed by Sascha Hehn as Captain Victor Burger with the 2014-screening.
