= SOKO (TV series) =

European television franchise

SOKO is a German (ZDF) and Austrian (ORF) police procedural television series franchise. "SOKO" is an abbreviation of the German word Sonderkommission, which means "special investigative team". Some English-language titles do not contain the word "SOKO", however.

Launched in 1978 under the title SOKO 5113 (changed to SOKO München in 2015), the original series ran for 42 years, until 2020. The first spin-off of SOKO München was a twelve-part series named Solo für Sudmann, launched in 1997. This was followed by various SOKO series based in different cities in Germany and Austria.

== List of series ==
- SOKO 5113 / SOKO München (1978–2020)
- Solo für Sudmann (1997)
- SOKO Leipzig (2001–present)
- SOKO Kitzbühel (2001–2021)
- SOKO Köln (2003–present)
- SOKO Wismar (2004–present)
- SOKO Donau (in Germany SOKO Wien; 2005–present)
  - "Der vierte Mann", a Donau–Leipzig single-episode crossover (2019)
- SOKO Rhein-Main (2006–2007; initially titled Die Spezialisten: Kripo Rhein-Main)
- SOKO Stuttgart (2009–present)
- SOKO – Der Prozess five-part crossover between five ZDF SOKO series (2013)
- SOKO Hamburg (2018–2024)
- SOKO Potsdam (2018–present); first three seasons streamed under the name Luna + Sophie in the United States
- SOKO Linz (2021–present)
