= Klara Höfels =

German actress (1949–2022)

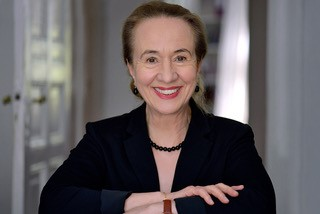
- Höfels in 2020
- Born: 5 April 1949; Grevenbroich, North Rhine-Westphalia, British occupation zone in Germany
- Died: 15 May 2022 (aged 73); Berlin, Germany
- Occupations: Actress; Producer
- Website: www.klara-hoefels.de

Klara Höfels ([ˈklaːʀa ˈhøːfəls]; 5 April 1949 – 15 May 2022) was a German actress, director and theatre producer. She was first a stage actress, who played leading roles on stage at Schauspiel Frankfurt, Residenztheater in Munich and Staatstheater Stuttgart. She became known for roles in television series such as SOKO and Hinter Gittern – Der Frauenknast, beginning in the 1990s. She produced film documentaries, responsible for direction and camera, and ran Autorentheater Berlin for new theatre projects.

== Life ==
Born on 5 April 1949 in Grevenbroich, Höfels studied to be an actress at the Folkwang-Hochschule in Essen from 1969 to 1972. She had a relationship with the actor Michael Greiling; their daughter Alwara Höfels, born in 1982, also became an actress.

Höfels died in Berlin on 15 May 2022 at age 73 after a short illness.

=== Theatre ===
Höfels was first engaged at the Schlosstheater Celle from 1972 to 1974. From 1974 to 1978, she played at the Stadttheater Kiel, which was run as a Mitbestimmungstheater, directed by Dieter Reible. She then moved to the Schauspiel Frankfurt, directed by Peter Palitzsch also as a Mitbestimmungstheater. She portrayed there Elmire in Tartuffe, directed by B. K. Tragelehn, and Mascha, directed by Thomas Langhoff, among other leading roles. She collaborated with directors such as Hans Neuenfels and Maria Reinhard.

From 1983, Höfels was a member of the Residenztheater in Munich, where she performed as Princess in Calderón's Das Leben ein Traum, directed by Wilfried Minks. She played Marjorie in William Mastrosimone's Extremities directed by Reinhard.

In 1985, she moved to the Staatstheater Stuttgart where she remained until 1990. Leading roles there included Anna Petrovna in Michael Frayn's Wild Honey, alongside Gert Voss as Platonov. She also appeared as Farown in O'Casey's Freudenfeuer für den Bischof, directed by Jürgen Bosse. From 1990, Höfels worked freelance to focus on her own projects for theatre and films. She played as a guest with the Berliner Ensemble in 1997, in the role of Frau Sarti in Brecht's Leben des Galilei, alongside Sepp Bierbichler in the title role, directed by Tragelehn.

=== Film and television ===
Beginning in the mid-1990s, Höfels also played in film and television. She played in crime series such as SOKO, the role of Ingrid Schlüter in the RTL Hinter Gittern – Der Frauenknast from 2006 to 2007. In 2017, she portrayed Dr. Hannelore Thies in the tele-novela Rote Rosen. She played in the series Wilsberg, and in 2020 the physician Dr. Susanne Oppermann in Gute Besserung of the ZDF Ein starkes Team.

=== World premieres ===
Höfels appeared in new plays, some in collaboration with author and director Christian Duda:

- 1989: Medea Medea, coproduction with Staatstheater Nürnberg, authors: Christian Duda and Helmut Lorin, Medea: Klara Höfels, director: C. A. Gad Elkarim
- 1991: EswarKriegesistKriegeswirdKriegsein, coproduction with Renitenztheater Stuttgart, author: Duda, director: Elkarim
- 1990: Theater Intim – coproduction with Renitenztheater Stuttgart, author and actor: Lorin, director: Elkarim
- 1992: Lucrezia Borgia, commission of Universität Stuttgart for the congress Die Borgia in Schwäbisch Hall, author: Duda, production and acting: Höfels, director: Elkarim
- 1993: Dr. hc. Burkhardt Blässling, Musikhalle Ludwigsburg, author: Duda, director: Elkarim
- 1997: Der Jude von Malta by Christopher Marlowe arranged by Duda, Theater am Ufer Berlin, production and acting: Höfels, direction: Elkarim

=== Autorentheater ===
She founded the Autorentheater Berlin (Authors' theatre), with projects including:

- 2005: Leben: Acht Frauen – acht Wege, coproduction with Theaterhaus Mitte Berlin, conceived and directed by Höfels
- 2006: Leonida oder Miss Europa, author: Volker Lüdecke, Leonida: Höfels, director: Hermann Treusch
- 2008–2009: Pantarhei-allesfließt, at Babylon Berlin, Rosa-Luxemburg-Platz
- 2010: Der Abend nach dem Begräbnis der besten Freundin, coproduction with Kesselhaus der Kulturbrauerei Berlin, author: Marlene Streeruwitz, director: Gabriele Jakobi

== Filmography ==
=== Roles in films and television ===
- 2012: Überleben an der Wickelfront, TV film, dir. Titus Selge
- 2016: Toni Erdmann, film, dir. Maren Ade
- 2016: SOKO München, series, dir. Katharina Bischof
- 2017: Die Konfirmation, dir. Stefan Krohmer
- 2017: Abgeschnitten, film, dir. Christian Alvart
- 2018: Wilsberg: Mörderische Rendite, episode, dir. Martin Enlen
- 2019: Joachim Vernau: Totengebet, episode, dir. Josef Rusnak
- 2020: Ein starkes Team: Gute Besserung, episode, dir. Johannes Grieser
- 2021: SOKO Hamburg: Tod an der Alster, episode, dir. Jan Bauer

=== Documentaries ===
Höfels produced several documentaries, from idea to direction, camera and editing, including:

- 2010: 10 MONATE
- 2009: Das letzte Mal (camera also Harald Korff, editing also Britt Kanja)
- 2008: Klara Klar
- 2007: Frauenleben

== Awards ==
- 2016: Eho (Echo) – Silver Zenith, International Film Festival in Montreal
- 2018: A Mere Breath – Heart of Sarajevo for the best short film
