= Rissmann =

Rissmann is a surname. Notable people with the surname include:

- Marc Rissmann (born 1980), German actor
- Sven Rissmann (born 1978), German politician
