= Sven Martinek =

German actor (born 1964)

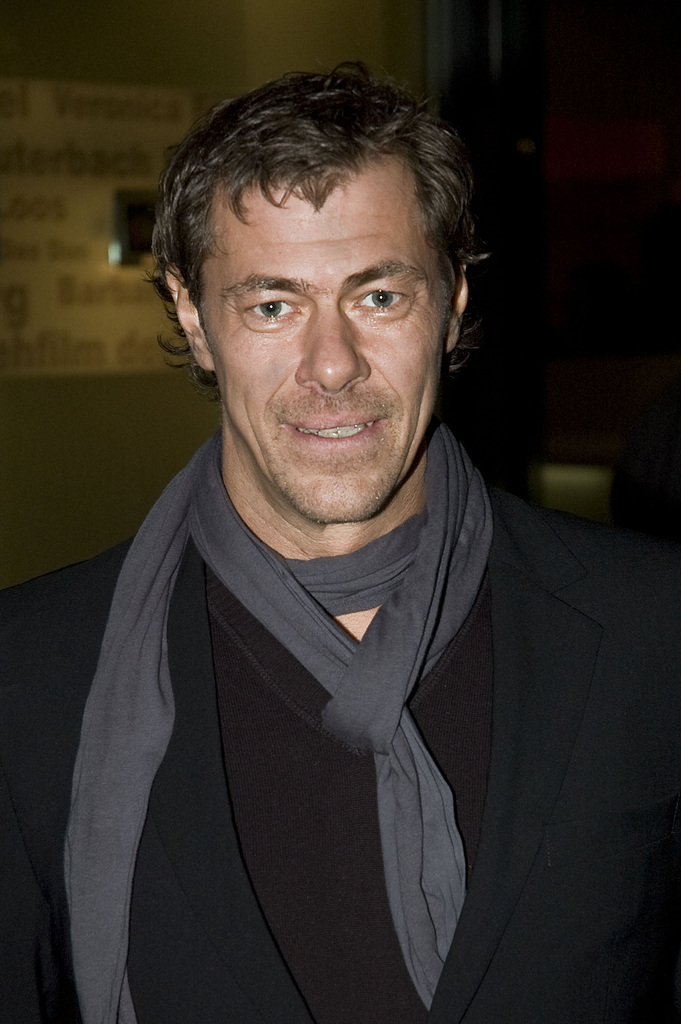
- Born: Sven Martinek; 18 February 1964 (age 61); Magdeburg, Sachsen-Anhalt, East Germany (now Germany)
- Occupation: Actor

Sven Martinek (born 18 February 1964) is a German actor, best known for portraying the main character Max Zander on the German TV series Der Clown.

He was married to German actress Xenia Seeberg from 2003 to 2011.

== Filmography ==
=== Film ===
| Year | Film | Role | Notes |
|---|---|---|---|
| 1983 | Island of Swans | Windjacke | |
| 1989 | Die Besteigung des Chimborazo | Reinhard von Haeften | |
| 1992 | Karl May | recruiter | |
| 1995 | Rache | Axel | |
| 2003 | Run Over | keeper | |
| 2003 | Berlin Blues | patrolman | |
| 2004 | Agnes and His Brothers | Jürgen | |
| 2004 | Funky Monkey | St. Dominic Coach | |
| 2005 | The Clown: Payday | Max Zander | |
| 2008 | Il giardino | A businessman | |

=== Television ===
| Year | Programme or series | Role | Notes |
|---|---|---|---|
| 1982 | Das Mädchen und der Junge | Frank | |
| 1985 | Der Staatsanwalt hat das Wort | Lorenz | |
| 1988–2002 | Polizeiruf 110 | Marietta's boyfriend Karo; Thomas Schweizer | three episodes |
| 1992 | Landschaft mit Dornen | Marcel | |
| 1992 | Großstadtrevier | Ingo Pallmann | |
| 1993 | Immer wieder Sonntag | | |
| 1994 | Verliebt, verlobt, verheiratet | | |
| 1994 | Freunde fürs Leben | Steve Conolly | |
| 1995 | The Public Prosecutor | Sauer | TV miniseries |
| 1995 | The Infiltrator | Anton | |
| 1995 | Doppelter Einsatz | Hanno Tietz | |
| 1995–2002 | Tatort | Jan; Jan Kott; Christian | three episodes |
| 1996 | Mona M. – Mit den Waffen einer Frau | Mike | |
| 1996 | Zwei vom gleichen Schlag | Daniel Schäfer | |
| 1996 | Der Clown | Max Zander | Television pilot |
| 1996 | Adrenalin | Jochen Wagner | |
| 1997 | SOKO 5113 | Lothar Krieges | |
| 1997 | Freunde wie wir | Thomas Reuter | |
| 1997 | Die heilige Hure | Paul Gruber | |
| 1997 | Beichtstuhl der Begierde | Jürgen Mayer | |
| 1997–2008 | Alarm für Cobra 11 - Die Autobahnpolizei | Sam; Harald Kollmann; Wolf Mahler | three episodes |
| 1998–2001 | Der Clown | Max Zander | 45 episodes |
| 1999 | Bombs Under Berlin | diving instructor | |
| 1999 | The Trucker and the Thief | Till Sichert | |
| 2001 | Victor – Der Schutzengel | Toni | |
| 2002 | Körner und Köter | Martti | |
| 2002 | Rendörsztori | Edit's producer | |
| 2002 | Hotte in Paradise | Peter | |
| 2003 | Zwei Profis | Thorsten Kummer | |
| 2003 | Alarm für Cobra 11 – Einsatz für Team 2 | Manfred Kosinski | |
| 2003 | Rotlicht – Im Dickicht der Großstadt | René | |
| 2004 | Stefanie – Eine Frau startet durch | Dr. Martin Bauer | |
| 2005 | In aller Freundschaft | Jan Berger | |
| 2005 | Ein starkes Team | Winne | |
| 2006 | Mit Herz und Handschellen | Gerber | |
| 2006 | Leipzig Homicide | Holger Franke | |
| 2006 | Hammer & Hart | businessman | |
| 2006 | Donna Leon | liaison officer | |
| 2006–2007 | SOKO Rhein-Main | detective chief superintendent Thomas Wallner | |
| 2006–2010 | Zoo Doctor: My Mom the Vet | Dr. Christoph Lentz | |
| 2008 | Hindernisse des Herzens | Hans Duwe | |
| 2009 | Der Bergdoktor | Richard Beisel | |
| 2009 | Ein Fall für zwei | Armin Schütte | |
| 2009 | Der Kriminalist | Tilmann Reiter | |
| 2009 | Stuttgart Homicide | Volker Richter | |
| 2009–2010 | Die Landärztin | Daniel Winterberg | |
| 2010 | Notruf Hafenkante | | |
| 2010 | Der letzte Bulle | Thomas Schmückler | |
| 2010 | Drei gegen einen | Andreas Behrens | |
| 2010 | Voodoo für Anfänger | Robert Günther | |
| since 2012 | Morden im Norden | Finn Kiesewetter | 141 episodes |
| 2013 | A World Beyond | Conrad Landgraf | |
