= SOKO – Der Prozess =

German crime drama television series

- Genre: Crime drama
- Written by: Sven S. Poser; Sönke Lars Neuwöhner; Jonas Winner; Martin Eigler
- Directed by: Bodo Schwarz; Michael Schneider; Oren Schmuckler; Kaspar Heidelbach; Jörg Mielich
- Starring: Andreas Schmidt-Schaller; Gerd Silberbauer; Sissy Höfferer; Udo Kroschwald; Astrid M. Fünderich; Matthias Schloo; Jochen Nickel; Yvonne Catterfeld
- Theme music composer: Georg Kleinebreil; Arpad Bondy; Hermann Langschwert; Udo Lindenberg; Uwe Schenk
- Composers: Patrick Schmitz; Alex Komlew
- Country of origin: Germany
- Original language: German
- No. of seasons: 1
- No. of episodes: 5

Production
- Executive producers: Eva Gerstenberg; Britta Hansen; Catrin Kauffmann; Jakob Krebs; Torsten Lenkeit; Henriette Lippold; Andrea Rullmann
- Producers: Wolfgang Cimera; Joachim Kosack; Ariane Krampe; Dagmar Rosenbauer; Silke Schulze-Erdel; Daniel van den Berg; Oliver Vogel; Jörg Winger
- Production locations: Leipzig; Munich; Cologne; Wismar; Stuttgart
- Cinematography: Christian Marohl; David Schultz; Constantin Kesting; Daniel Koppelkamm; Henning Jessel
- Editors: Anna Katharina Brehm; Wolfgang Witt; Matthias Pfeifer; Dirk Rademacher; Stephan Wiesehöfer
- Camera setup: Film; multiple-camera
- Running time: 43 minutes
- Production companies: UFA Fernsehproduktion; Network Movie; Bavaria Fernsehproduktion; CineCentrum Berlin

Original release
- Network: ZDF
- Release: 30 September – 4 October 2013

Related
- SOKO München; SOKO Köln; Leipzig Homicide; SOKO Stuttgart; SOKO Wismar

SOKO – Der Prozess is a German five-part crossover between five ZDF SOKO series, combining the special investigative teams from Munich, Cologne, Leipzig, Stuttgart, and Wismar. It was broadcast from 30 September 2013 to 4 October 2013, on German television channel ZDF.

== Cast and characters ==
=== SOKO teams ===
Actor	Role	Function
SOKO 5113
Gerd Silberbauer	Arthur Bauer	Chief inspector
Michel Guillaume	Theo Renner	Chief inspector
Bianca Hein	Katharina Hahn	Chief inspector
Joscha Kiefer	Dominik Morgenstern	Detective inspector
Florian Odendahl	Dr. Maximilian Weissenböck	Coroner
SOKO Köln
Sissy Höfferer	Karin Reuter	Chief inspector
Pierre Besson	Matti Wagner	Chief inspector
Lukas Piloty	Jonas Fischer	Detective inspector
Kerstin Landsmann	Vanessa Haas	Detective inspector
Thomas Clemens	Dr. Philip Kraft	Coroner
SOKO Wismar
Udo Kroschwald	Jan-Hinrich Reuter	First chief inspector
Claudia Schmutzler	Katrin Börensen	Chief inspector
Li Hagman	Leena Virtanen	Constable
Jonas Laux	Nils Theede	Chief inspector
Mathias Junge	Kai Timmermann	Chief police officer
Silke Matthias	Silke Schwarz	Forensic scientist
Katharina Blaschke	Dr. Helene Sturbeck	Coroner
SOKO Stuttgart
Astrid M. Fünderich	Martina Seiffert	First chief inspector
Peter Ketnath	Jo Stoll	Chief inspector
Benjamin Strecker	Rico Sander	Detective inspector
Sylta Fee Wegmann	Cornelia "Nelly" Kienzle	Detective inspector candidate
Karl Kranzkowski	Michael Kaiser	Crime director
Mike Zaka Sommerfeldt	Jan Arnaud	Head of forensic investigation
Eva Maria Bayerwaltes	Prof. Dr. Lisa Wolter	Coroner
Michael Gaedt	Karl Heinz "Schrotti" Schrothmann	Workshop owner
Christian Pätzold	Friedemann Sonntag	Head of evidence room
Leipzig Homicide
Andreas Schmidt-Schaller	Hans-Joachim "Hajo" Trautzschke	Chief inspector
Marco Girnth	Jan Maybach	Chief inspector
Melanie Marschke	Ina Zimmermann	Chief inspector
Steffen Schroeder	Tom Kowalski	Chief inspector
Michael Rotschopf	Dr. Alexander Binz	Prosecutor
Nilam Farooq	Olivia Fareedi	Trainee
Daniel Steiner	Lorenz Rettig	Laboratory assistant
Anna Stieblich	Dr. Sabine Rossi	Coroner
Judith Sehrbrock	Dr. Stein	Coroner

=== Guest cast ===
Actor	Role	Function
Matthias Schloo	Paul Korte	Lawyer of the co-plaintiff in Leipzig trial; son of Frank Wellinger; fiancé of Alicia Lammers
Jochen Nickel	Frank Wellinger	Co-founder of MC Bullsharks, head of the Munich chapter; father of Paul Korte
Yvonne Catterfeld	Alicia Lammers	Medical student; daughter of Heike and Uwe Lammers; fiancée of Paul Korte
Claudine Wilde	Nadja Schramm	Lawyer of the accused in Leipzig trial
Felix Vörtler	Alex Krüger	Co-founder of MC Bullsharks, head of the Cologne chapter; defendant in Leipzig trial
Michael Roll	Karel Schweikert	Prosecutor in Leipzig trial

== Episodes ==
No.	Title	Directed by	Written by	Original release date	German viewers (millions)
1	"Väter und Söhne"	Bodo Schwarz	Sönke Lars Neuwöhner	30 September 2013	3.73
Guest stars: Aleksandar Jovanovic as Thomas Brandner, Christian Näthe as Bastian Vieth, Eva-Maria Grein von Friedl as Maria Riedl, Daniela Heinisch as Monika, Pierre Kiwitt as biker
2	"Undercover unter Kutten"	Michael Schneider	Sven S. Poser	1 October 2013	3.53
Guest stars: Antonio Wannek as Jochen "Büb" Schreiber, Walter Kreye as Jonathan Hirtmann, Anne Diemer as Lisbeth Brandner, Sven Martinek as Anton "Toni" Ueckerath
3	"Tief im Sumpf"	Oren Schmuckler	Jonas Winner	2 October 2013	3.43
Guest stars: Gedeon Burkhard as Thomas Gehring, Sandra Ruffin as Emily Schaper, Marc Rissmann as Pit Nielandt, Michael Silbereisen as Falk Budnik, Jan Felski as Manne Herber, Lena Taege as Jule Wachowiak, Harald Burmeister as Juwelier Seemann
4	"Die Falle"	Kaspar Heidelbach	Martin Eigler	3 October 2013	3.13
Guest stars: Antonio Wannek as Jochen "Büb" Schreiber, Mareike Carrière as Heike Lammers, Sven Martinek as Anton "Toni" Ueckerath
5	"Bis die Maske fällt"	Jörg Mielich	Sven S. Poser	4 October 2013	3.44
Guest stars: Annika Kuhl as Maren Santini, Christine Schmidt-Schaller as judge, Florian Kleine as Michael Santini

== See also ==
- List of German television series
