= Michael Roll (actor) =

German actor

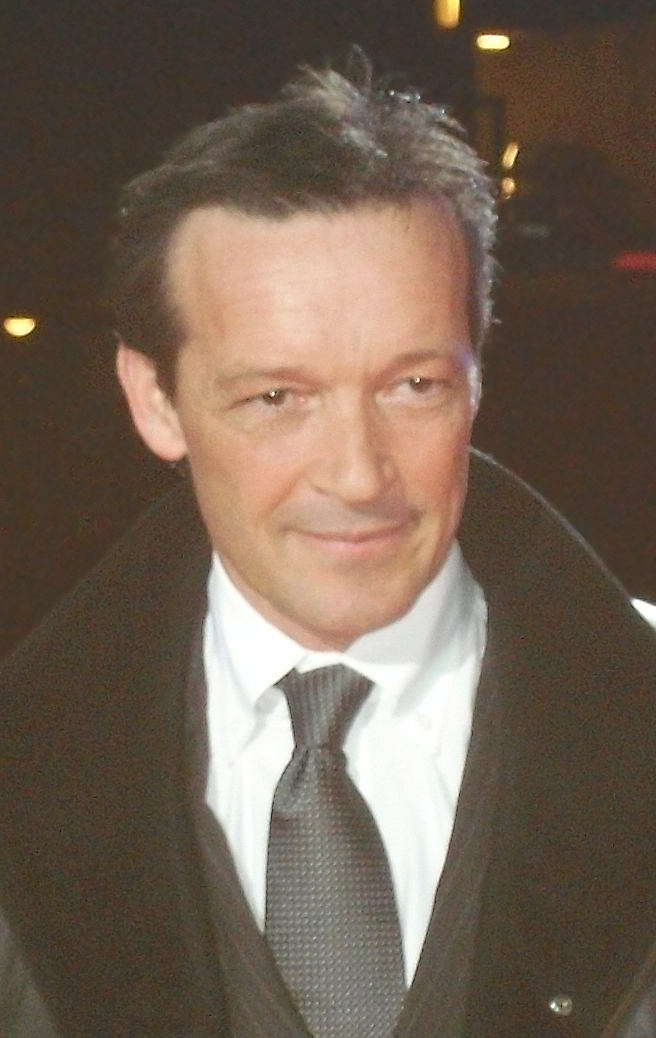
- Roll in 2008
- Born: 29 April 1961 (age 64); Munich, Bavaria, West Germany
- Occupation: Actor
- Years active: 1982–present

Michael Roll (born 29 April 1961 in Munich) is a German television actor.

== Selected filmography ==
- 1988: Lorentz & Söhne
- 1989: Die schnelle Gerdi
- 1993: Einmal die Woche
- 1994–1996: Der König
- 1995: Über Kreuz
- 1997: Berlin – Moskau
- 1999: Drei mit Herz
- 2000: Rosamunde Pilcher – Der lange Weg zum Glück
- 2001: Heart
- 2001: Sieben Tage im Paradies
- 2004: Zwei Männer und ein Baby
- 2004: Ein Gauner Gottes
- 2005: Happiness on the Staircase
- 2005: Hengstparade
- 2005: Andersrum
- 2006: M.E.T.R.O. – Ein Team auf Leben und Tod
- Guest star in Café Meineid, Siska, The Old Fox, Der Fahnder, Derrick, Tatort, Ein Fall für zwei, Polizeiruf 110, Der Bulle von Tölz, Die glückliche Familie and SOKO 5113.
