= Landsmann =

Surname

Landsmann is a surname. Notable people with the surname include:

- Kerstin Landsmann (born 1977), German actress and stuntwoman
- Maik Landsmann (born 1967), East German track cyclist
