= Marc Rissmann =

German actor

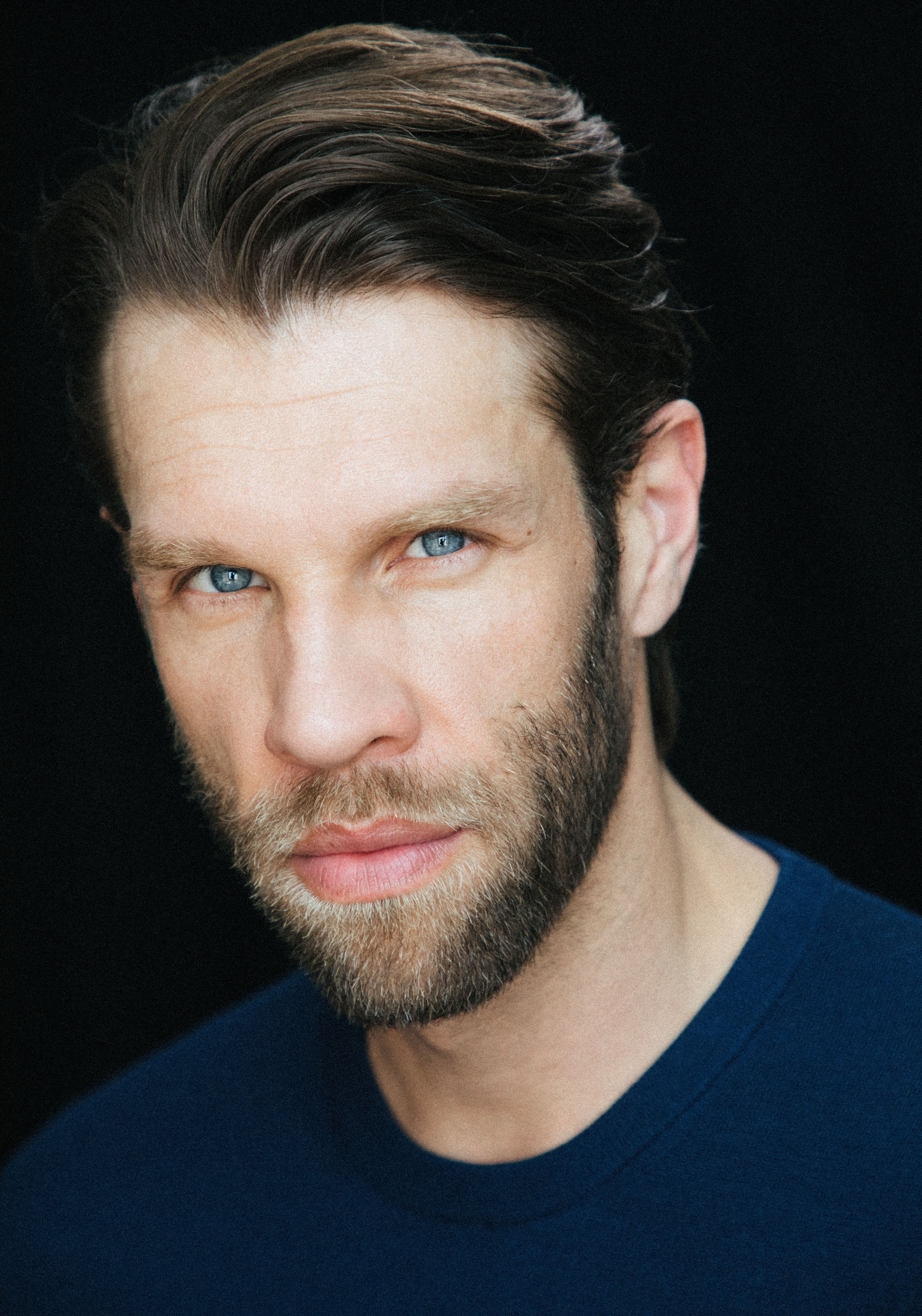
- Born: 1980 (age 45–46); Berlin, Germany
- Occupation: Actor
- Spouse: Ana Ularu (m. 2015)

Marc Rissmann (also spelled Rißmann, born 1980) is a German actor. He has appeared in films like Overlord, and TV series like The Last Kingdom, Game of Thrones, and The Man in the High Castle.

== Early life and career ==
Born in Berlin, Marc Rissmann studied at the College of Dramatic Arts "Ernst Busch" Berlin. On stage, Rissmann performed at the Deutsches Theater in Berlin in Danton's Death In 2009, under the direction of Kay Voges, he played Lysander in the Shakespeare comedy A Midsummer Night's Dream. From 2009 to 2011, he was a permanent member of the Theater Magdeburg ensemble.

Rissmann has appeared in numerous German series early in his career, including Der letzte Bulle, SOKO – Der Prozess, and Binny and the Ghost. He then broke into the international market, with roles in The Last Kingdom, Riviera, and Into the Badlands.

In 2019, he appeared in the eighth season of Game of Thrones as Harry Strickland, the commander of the mercenary company the Golden Company, and as Wilhelm Goertzmann in season four of The Man in the High Castle. Rissmann also works as a director – his recent works include the Please Tell Rosie music video for Alle Farben, and a commercial campaign for the German National Lotto. He is married to Romanian actrice Ana Ularu; they have a daughter called Ezra.

== Filmography ==
=== As actor ===
==== Film ====
Year	Title	Role	Notes
2025	The Amateur	Mishka Blazhic	
2022	Endlich Witwer – Forever Young	Reporter	
2020	Saturn	Titan	
2019	Liberté: A Call to Spy	Klaus Barbie	
2018	Overlord	Scherzer	
2015	Friesland: Familiengeheimnisse	Thorsten	
2013	Prehistoria	Kev	Short film
2012	Marie Brand und das Lied von Tod und Liebe	Michael Fleck	
2012	Tod einer Polizistin	Oli	
2011	Nazi Goreng	Jan	

==== Television ====
Year	Title	Role	Notes
2025	Andor	Pluti	2 episodes
2021	1883	Josef	
2019	The Man in the High Castle	Wilhelm Goertzmann	3 episodes
2019	Game of Thrones	Harry Strickland	2 episodes
2018	Gegen die Angst	Mirko	
2018	Tatort – Alles was sie sagen	Olaf Spieß	1 episode
2017	Into the Badlands	Nos	1 episode
2017	Riviera	Klaus Schneider	2 episodes
2017	The Last Kingdom	Tekil	4 episodes
2017	Stuttgart Homicide	Mark Schildt / Andi Springer	2 episodes
2016	Tatort – Tanzmariechen	Daniel Mühlberger	1 episode
2015	Paare	Thomas	1 episode
2015	Reif für die Insel	violinist	1 episode
2014	Aus der Haut	Fritzi	1 episode
2014	Alarm für Cobra 11		1 episode
2013	Letzte Spur Berlin		1 episode
2013	SOKO Wismar		1 episode
2013	Christine, Perfekt war gestern		

=== As director ===
Year	Title	Notes
2018	Lisa & Frank	Commercial campaign for the German National Lotto
2017	Please Tell Rossie	Alle Farben's music video
2016	Supergirl	Anna Naklab feat. YOUNOTUS & Alle Farben
