= Der Clown =

German television series

- Genre: Action; crime drama; superhero
- Directed by: Hermann Joha
- Starring: Sven Martinek; Diana Frank; Thomas Anzenhofer; Volkmar Kleinert
- Theme music composer: Helmut Zerlett
- Composer: Helmut Zerlett
- Country of origin: Germany
- Original language: German
- No. of episodes: 46

Original release
- Network: RTL
- Release: 21 April 1998 – 11 October 2001

Der Clown (English: "the clown") is a German television series that aired between 21 April 1998 and 11 October 2001. Initially launched in 1996 as a pilot movie, it ran for 46 episodes and starred Sven Martinek, Diana Frank, Thomas Anzenhofer, and Volkmar Kleinert.

== Synopsis ==
The story is about Max Zander, an agent from WIPA (World Intelligence Police Agency). When his friend dies in a car bomb meant for him, Max decides to fake his own death and live as a phantom, known only as "the Clown", and fight crime. He gets help from his friends, journalist Claudia Diehl, pilot Tobias "Dobbs" Steiger, and lawyer Joseph Ludowski.

== Film ==
On 24 March 2005, the movie The Clown: Payday, a film sequel to the TV series, was released in German cinemas.
