= Volkmar Kleinert =

German actor (born 1938)

- Born: 20 September 1938 (age 87); Dresden, Germany
- Occupation: Actor
- Years active: 1959–present

Volkmar Kleinert (born 20 September 1938) is a German actor. He studied at the Theaterhochschule Leipzig and appeared in more than one hundred films since 1959.

== Filmography ==
Film
Year	Title	Role	Notes
1959	Verwirrung der Liebe	Student	
1964	Engel im Fegefeuer		
1965	The Adventures of Werner Holt	Obervormann Schulze	
1965	Entlassen auf Bewährung	Hugo Borke	
1968	Leben zu zweit	Klapproth	
1968	Die Toten bleiben jung	Becker	
1969	Weite Strassen stille Liebe	Volvo-Fahrer	
1970	Im Spannungsfeld	Willy Wendrin	
1971	KLK Calling PTZ – The Red Orchestra	Kollo	
1971	Zeit der Störche	Einstein	
1972	Trotz alledem!		
1973	Das zweite Leben des Friedrich Wilhelm Georg Platow	Ditfurt	
1974	Elective Affinities	Graf	
1975	Am Ende der Welt	Horst	
1976	Das Licht auf dem Galgen	Galdy	
1976	Philipp, der Kleine	Musiklehrer Breitkreuz	
1977	Die Flucht	Dr. Wendt	
1980	Komödianten-Emil	Hakenjakob	
1986	Jan auf der Zille	Hinkender	
1987	Johann Strauss: The King Without a Crown		
1987	Hasenherz	Regisseur Berger	
1989	Otto: The Alien from East Frisia	J.R. Van Devil	
1991	Who's Afraid of Red, Yellow and Blue	Funktionär	
1992	Cosimas Lexikon	Herr Rosener	
1994	The Quality of Mercy	Herr Kamer	
1999	Heroes Like Us	Wunderlich	
2006	The Lives of Others	Albert Jerska	
2008	My Mother's Tears	Günter	
2010	Boxhagener Platz	Dr. Klemm	
2019	Lara	Prof. Reinhoffer	

TV
Year	Title	Role	Notes
1996	Alarm für Cobra 11 - Die Autobahnpolizei	Dr. Peter Sawatzki	1 episode
1998-1999	Der Clown	Joseph Ludowski	15 episodes
