= Sabine (TV series) =

- Country of origin: Germany

Sabine is a German television series.

The cast included Astrid M. Fünderich.

== See also ==
- List of German television series
