= Astrid M. Fünderich =

German actress

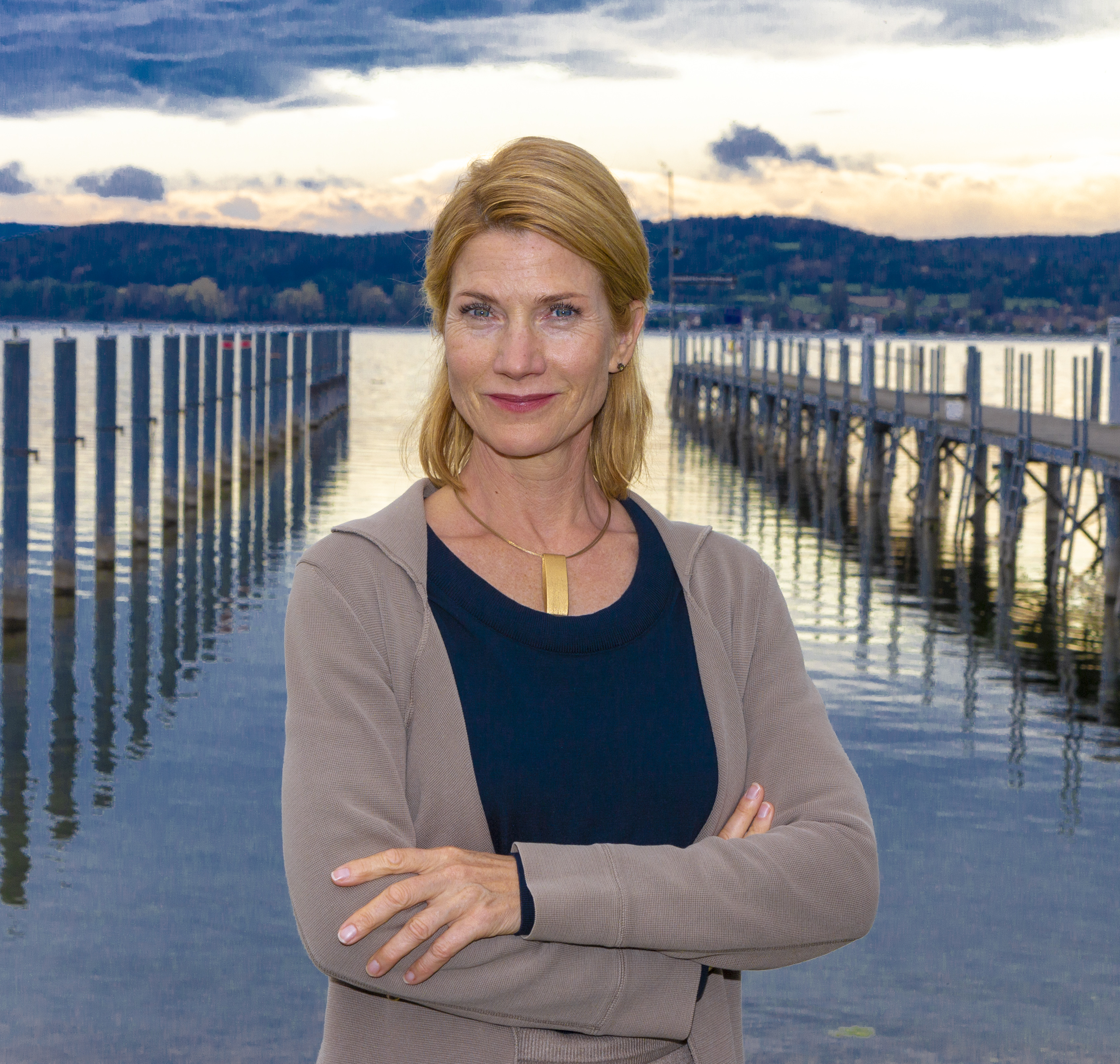
- Astrid M. Fünderich (2019)
- Born: 27 September 1963 (age 62); Düsseldorf, Germany
- Occupation: Actress

Astrid Margarete Fünderich (born 27 September 1963 in Düsseldorf) is a German actress.

== Life ==
Fünderich was born in Düsseldorf in 1963 and first studied geology in Aachen, but she broke off her studies in 1991 to join the ensemble at the independent Theater K in Aachen. From 1992, she studied acting, training under Philippe Gaulier at École Philippe Gaulier in London and with the Hollywood Acting Workshop in Los Angeles. In 1993 she spent a year on tour with TheaterDämmering ('theater twilight'). Her television debut was in 1994 with a walk-on part in the series ER.

Her first recurring role was as Sister Ina in the Children's Hospital Sat.1 series Hallo, Onkel Doc!. She has been with an agent since 1997.

After one season with Mobbing Girls Fünderich played the role of medical examiner Katharina Winkler in the ARD series Der Fahnder from 1997 to 2001. From 1998 to 2002 she had the continuous lead role as BKA official Eva Glaser in the RTL crime series Die Cleveren, which earned her a German Television Award nomination in 2001.

From 2002 to 2004 she played deputy headmistress Ruth Hecker in the series Sabine! There followed engagements with Tatort, Wilsberg, Sperling, Pfarrer Braun etc. Since 2009, she has been continuously in the ZDF crime series Stuttgart Homicide in the lead role of First Detective Chief Superintendent Martina Seiffert, Head of SOKO.

Astrid M. Fünderich married in 1997 and lives with her family in Stuttgart. 2006 she gave birth to a son. Since May 2013, she has been a member of the Board of Trustees of the Deutsche Kinderkrebsnachsorge (German Childhood Cancer Aftercare) Foundation for chronically ill children in Villingen-Schwenningen, which advocates for family-oriented rehabilitation of children suffering from cancer, heart disease and cystic fibrosis. She is also an active supporter of Campact and Avaaz and atmosfair, a sustaining member of UNICEF and engages herself for various local projects in and around Stuttgart.

== Filmography ==
- 1995–1998: Hallo, Onkel Doc! (TV series, 53 episodes)
- 1996: Balko (TV series, one episode)
- 1998: Twiggy – Liebe auf Diät (TV film)
- 1998: Mobbing Girls (TV series, 13 episodes)
- 1998–2001: Der Fahnder (TV series, 15 episodes)
- 1998–2002: Die Cleveren (TV series, 31 episodes)
- 1998: Zerschmetterte Träume – Eine Liebe in Fesseln (TV film)
- 1998–2002: Alarm für Cobra 11 – Die Autobahnpolizei (TV series, 4 episodes)
- 2000–2001: Küstenwache (TV series, 3 episodes)
- 2000: Polizeiruf 110: La Paloma (TV)
- 2001: Die Frau, die Freundin und der Vergewaltiger (TV film)
- 2001: Todeslust (TV film)
- 2002–2009: SOKO 5113 (TV series, 5 episodes)
- 2003–2015: In aller Freundschaft (TV series, 6 episodes)
- 2003: Sabine! (TV series, 20 episodes)
- 2003: Im Namen des Gesetzes (TV series, one episode)
- 2003: Sperling: Sperling und die Angst vor dem Schmerz (TV)
- 2004–2009: Ein Fall für zwei (TV series, drei episodes)
- 2005: Tatort: Der Name der Orchidee (TV)
- 2006: Pfarrer Braun (TV series, one episode)
- 2006: Wilsberg: Callgirls (TV)
- 2009: Notruf Hafenkante (TV series, one episode)
- 2009: The Old Fox (TV series, one episode)
- since 2009: Stuttgart Homicide (TV series)
- 2015: Rhein-Lahn-Krimir (TV series)
- 2019: Das Menschenmögliche
