= Miriam Dehne =

German film director and screenwriter

[[

Miriam Dehne at Filmfest München 2026

|thumb|alt=Author and Director Miriam Dehne |Author and Director Miriam Dehne ]]

Miriam Dehne (born February 23, 1968, in Düsseldorf), is a German film director and screenwriter.

== Biography and artistic development ==
Miriam Dehne grew up in Düsseldorf. After graduation, she moved to Berlin. She completed her design studies at the Hochschule der Künste (HdK, today UDK) under Professor Wolfgang Joop. The first Super 8 films about the scene in Berlin in the 1980s / 1990s were made during her studies. She attends the masterclasses of Mark W. Travis, Judith Weston and Keith Cunningham (among others). Berlin Stories, her first full-length feature film, premiered at the Berlinale in 2005, is honored by the Confédération Internationale des Cinémas D’Art et Essai and receives a nomination for the Deutscher Filmpreis (German Film Prize). In addition to her work for the cinema and television, Miriam Dehne creates as the author (screenplay written together with Jackie Thomae) and director the first German web-fiction format They call us Candy Girls for which she receives the German IPTV Award. The feature film Little Paris is released in cinemas in 2009, also being nominated for the Deutscher Filmpreis and has its international premiere at the 11th Shanghai International Film Festival.

Alongside screenwriting, Miriam directs documentaries for various German television networks and lends her creative invention to the roles of story producer and showrunner on numerous new-media network formats, including the RTL show Let’s Dance. As a pilot director, she has developed the visual language for several Sat.1 daily dramas, including Die Landarztpraxis, setting the visual and tonal framework that a larger directing team then was then able to carry forward over hundreds of episodes.

In 2021, Dehne directed the ZDF TV Movie Die Sterntaler des Glücks and in 2022/24 directed episodes of the series Soko Potsdam and Soko Stuttgart, among others. Miriam is currently developing an FFA-supported feature film Her Last Take, inspired by the biographies of international ageless icons.

In 2026, the series Selling Sex, on which Miriam serves as creator, head writer, and director, had its world premiere at the Munich Film Festival and will have its official release on the ARD Mediathek in late August. As the Austrian newspaper Der Standard wrote, Ms Dehne wants "to break stereotypes" with her film. Reiner Tittelbach on the industry-influential film portal tittelbach.tv: “This excellently directed series neither relies clumsily on the ‘sex sells’ principle, nor does this three-hour dramedy take any dramatic missteps. Both of these factors are essential for the writers/directors Miriam Dehne and Marie C. König, as well as co-writer Hannah Schopf, to carry out their clever concept all the way to the clever ending (a kind of feminist meta-solution!) "Psychological conflicts take center stage; there are no superficial, contrived conflicts, and tense situations with customers are resolved in a refined manner. The casting of the lead roles is nothing short of perfect."

Her theater play Mom's Room (Laboratory Arts Collective / Christopher Guy Showroom in Los Angeles) premiered in 2014. The music film B-Movie: Lust and Sound in West Berlin, for which she is shooting the re-enactments, has its premiere at the Berlinale (Panorama) and receives in 2015 the Defa Foundation's Heiner Carow Prize for the successful combination of fiction and documentation. In the same year Dehne is a guest lecturer for acting at the Film University Babelsberg Konrad Wolf, where she works as the guest director of the film Falling Stars. The film received two awards (2017 Wildsound Female Feedback Toronto Film Festival, Best Cinematography (Florian Baumgärtner) and 2018 GWCIFF New York, Best Narrative Short )

As an author, she writes screenplays, short stories and plays. Her shortstory Lady Luck was awarded by the Rheinsberger Autorinnenforum. In 2014, her play Mom's Room premiered in Los Angeles (Laboratory Arts Collective / Christopher Guy Showroom). Here she worked with the artist collective The Laboratory Arts Collective, which was founded by the actor and producer Nigel Daly (Screen international). Together with the Hotel Soho House Berlin Dehne founded the women and film network Women and Film Salon (2011–2017) with regular events taking place at the Berlinale. After 2017, the engagement in cooperation with the Sir Savigny Hotel named Female Film Cocktail continued as part of the Berlinale. "The road ahead is long and there is much to be done: the women on the panel agree that there needs to be more solidarity among women, and that projects should make a point of involving other qualified women and carefully selecting topics", as said in a review about the event in 2019.

Dehne is a member of the Deutsche Film Akademie (German Film Academy) and Pro Quote Film. From 2013 to 2016, she was a jury member of the Prize for Young Cinematography by the German Film Academy and the Neue Nationalgalerie, and from 2017 to 2022 she is a jury member of the short film jury of the BKM (Federal Government Commissioner for Culture and the Media).

== Filmography – selection ==
=== As director ===
- 2024 Soko Stuttgart (TV series)
- 2022: Soko Potsdam (TV series)
- 2021: Die Sterntaler des Glücks (Herzkino, ZDF)
- 2018: 2018 Falkenberg Mord im Internat (Pilot/first episode)
- 2015: B-Movie: Lust & Sound in West-Berlin 1979–1989 (Regie Reenacments)
- 2014: Berlin Models, Serie (75 episodes)

=== As director and screenwriter ===
- 2026: Selling Sex, Mini Series, ARD
- 2015: Falling Stars, short film
- 2013: Tears, short film
- 2009, 2008: They Call Us Candy Girls, webisode, MySpace, 30 episodes, screenplay written with Jackie Thomae
- 2008: Little Paris, feature film, SWR
- 2005: Berlin Stories, feature film, ZDF, episode: Lizzy, episode film
- 2002: 99 Euro films, feature film, episode: Loreley S., short film
- 1993–2001: The Bull Never Wins, shortfilm; Vivi Kiss, shortfilm; I Love My Pony, ARTE, documentary film; Urban Style Mutation, documentary film; Cinderella’s Kleid, ARTE, shortfilm; Die Hochzeitsmacher, ARTE, documentary film, Surabaya Johnny, ARTE, staging of Brecht & documentary film; Don't Hate Me Because I'm Beautiful, ZDF-Kleines Fernsehspiel, documentary film; Barbie lebt, ARTE, documentary film; Babsi, a Name with Many Faces, ZDF-Das kleine Fernsehspiel, poetic documentary

== Music video – selection ==
=== As director and screenwriter ===
- 2011: Irgendwo in Berlin – musical film with Rosenstolz
- 2009: Wishing you Well – Stanfour
- 2009: Glaub Ihnen kein Wort – Cassandra Steen
- 2002: Ich und Elaine – 2raumwohnung

== Theater – selection ==
=== Regie ===
- 2014: Mom’s Room, The Labortaryartscollectiv, Los Angeles
- 2001: Pornostars mit Liebeskummer, Staatstheater Hannover

== Publications – selection ==
- Angel of Germany. Lyrics, with Inga Humpe. 2Raumwohnung, 2009.
- Du Bewegst Dich Richtig, 2Raumwohnung, 2007.
- A Dress from L.A, one of many stories about the designers Stefan Loy and Frank Ford / HEKMAG magazine, Berlin.
- Der Kaiser ist in der Gardrobe, fictional interview on the fashion industry and ecology, HEKMAG magazine, Berlin.
- Naomis Dress, diary of a German actress in Hollywood, theme: fashion and glamour, HEKMAG magazine, Berlin.
- Mom’s Room, English language play inspired by images of Marylin Minter, sleek magazine, Berlin.
- Diamond Daliah, short story about love and the decline of the art market, HEKMAG magazine, Berlin.
- Lady Luck, short story from the series ”Trip to Vegas”, Author’s Forum Rheinsberg, Rheinsberg.

== Nominations and awards ==
B-Movie: Lust & Sound in West-Berlin 1979–1989

- 2015 World Premiere at Berlinale Panorama
- DEFA Foundation Heiner Carow Preis

Little Paris

- 2009: Longlist Deutscher Filmpreis:
  - Best Performance by an Actress in a Supporting Role: Nina-Friederike Gnädig
  - Best Original Soundtrack: Marco Meister, Kriton Klingler-Ioannides
- 2008: nomination 22. Internationales Filmfest Braunschweig:
  - KINEMA French-German Youth Award
- 2008: Nomination 19. Filmkunstfest Mecklenburg-Vorpommern:
  - Film/Main award des Landes Mecklenburg-Vorpommern
  - Yound talent award: Sylta Fee Wegmann

They call us Candy Girls

- 2008: 2. IPTV AWARD at Munich Media Days
  - Most innovative project

A Dress from L.A.

- 2007: "ADC – Art Directors Club" Award:
  - Best editorial – Magazine article: for the article "A Dress from L.A., one of the possible storys about the designers Stefan Loy und Frank Ford"

Berlin Stories

- 2006: Longlist Deutscher Filmpreis:
  - Best supporting actress: Julia Hummer
  - Best supporting actress: Inga Busch
- 2005: Nomination femme totale / 10.Internationales Filmfestival Dortmund:
  - International Film Competition for Female Directors
- 2005: Honorable Mention Internationaler Verband der Filmkunsttheater / Confédération Internationale des Cinémas D’Art et Essai at the Berlinale

== Sources ==
- Kino in Kürze: Little Paris. In: Der Spiegel. Nr. 52/ 2008, page 127.
- Hans Schifferle: Weltschmerz in Pink. In: Süddeutsche Zeitung. Nr. 294, page 11.
- Christina Tilmann: Das Raubtier auf der Potse. In: Der Tagesspiegel. 15. Februar 2005.
- Philip Oehmke: Zuckersüße Revolution. In: Der Spiegel. Nr. 24/2008, page 170–172.
