= Little Paris (film) =

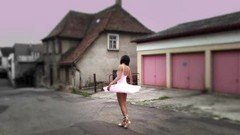
- Directed by: Miriam Dehne
- Starring: Sylta Fee Wegmann; Nina-Friederike Gnädig; Ralph Kretschmar
- Release date: 18 December 2008
- Running time: 1h 46min
- Country: Germany
- Language: German

Little Paris is a 2008 German drama film directed by Miriam Dehne.

== Cast ==
- Sylta Fee Wegmann - Luna
- Nina-Friederike Gnädig - Barbie
- Ralph Kretschmar - Ron
- Jasmin Schwiers - Eve
- Inga Busch - Tante Pat
- Patrick Pinheiro - G
- Volker Bruch - Stefan
- Stipe Erceg - Wassily
- Julia Dietze - Silver
