= Walter Presents =

British streaming service

- Country: United Kingdom
- Broadcast area: United Kingdom; Ireland; Australia; United States; Sweden; Norway; Denmark; Finland

Programming
- Picture format: 576i (SDTV) 16:9

Ownership
- Owner: Channel Four Television Corporation and Global Series Network

History
- Launched: 3 January 2016; 10 years ago

Walter Presents is a video-on-demand service of the UK's Channel 4, part of its streaming platform. Launched on 3 January 2016, it specialises in foreign-language drama and comedy with English subtitles. It is named after Walter Iuzzolino, who selects its content. The service was later offered as an ad-free subscription service in the United States in March 2017, and in Australia via a Foxtel service in November 2017. It launched in New Zealand in May 2020 as part of free streaming service TVNZ OnDemand (now TVNZ+). It has been available in Italy as an on-demand service since September 2018 through a deal between Global and Discovery Networks. In 2022 Walter Presents launched in Sweden, Norway, Denmark, and Finland on the premium streaming service C More.

== Production ==
In the UK, the service is a partnership between Channel 4 and Global Series Network. It is free to view and supported by advertisements. Walter Iuzzolino began reviewing potential content for the service two years before its launch, viewing 3,500 hours of television in all.

The service aims to avoid so-called art-house programming in favour of more mainstream productions that compete with Netflix and Amazon Prime for audiences already familiar with such Nordic dramas such as The Bridge. Iuzzolino set three criteria for selection: the show must be popular in its native country, as were Homeland and House of Cards in the United States; it must be "award-winning or already critically acclaimed"; and it must have "the finest writing, directing and acting that each country has to offer...something worth our time as viewers".

To promote the service, some of the content is also being aired on Channel 4's conventional channels, Channel 4 and More4. From October 2019, Welsh-language channel S4C began to broadcast some Walter Presents series with Welsh subtitles as part of Walter Presents ar gyfer S4C (Welsh for 'Walter Presents for S4C') with some series available with Welsh subtitles online on S4C Clic, the channel's on-demand service.

In the US, Walter Presents (originally known as Walter's Choice) is presented by PBS.

== Programmes ==
Title	Origin	Genre	Status
10	Switzerland	Mystery drama	Unavailable
13 Commandments	Belgium	Crime thriller	Available
23 Cases	Germany	Crime thriller	Available
Acquitted	Norway	Mystery drama	Unavailable
The Adulterer	The Netherlands	Drama	Available
Alex	Sweden	Thriller	Available
All the Sins	Finland	Crime drama	Available
Amsterdam Vice	The Netherlands	Crime drama	Available
Anne+	The Netherlands	Coming-of-age drama	Available
The Announcer	France	Period thriller	Available
Astrid	France	Detective / Police procedural	Available
Arctic Circle	Finland	Crime drama	Available
Bad Banks	Germany	Crime drama	Available
Beauty and the Baker	Israel	Romance drama	Unavailable
Before We Die	Sweden	Thriller	Available
Beyond Appearances	France	Mystery drama	Available
Black Widow	The Netherlands	Crime drama	Available
The Blood Pact	The Netherlands	Crime drama	Available
Blue Eyes	Sweden	Political thriller	Available
The Body Collector	The Netherlands	Drama	Available
The Border	Poland	Drama	Unavailable
Box 21	Sweden	Crime thriller	Available
Bullets	Finland	Thriller	Available
Case	Iceland	Psychological crime thriller	Unavailable
Cenk Batu	Germany	Crime drama	Unavailable
Clan	Belgium	Detective drama	Unavailable
The Cleaning Lady	Argentina	Crime thriller	Unavailable
Code 37: Sex Crimes	Belgium	Crime drama	Available
Contact	France	Mystery drama	Available
The Court	Iceland	Legal drama	Available
Cover Story	Iceland	Drama	Available
The Crimson Rivers	France	Crime drama	Available
Crow's Blood	Japan	Horror	Unavailable
Cry Wolf	Denmark	Drama	Available
Dead Beautiful	France	Thriller	Available
Deadly Money	Germany	Thriller	Unavailable
A Deadly Union	France	Mystery drama	Available
Deliver Us	Denmark	Psychological drama	Available
Detective Cain	France	Crime drama	Available
Deutschland 83	Germany	Spy drama	Unavailable
Deutschland 86	Germany	Spy drama	Unavailable
Deutschland 89	Germany	Spy drama	Unavailable
The Devil's Throat	Bulgaria	Crime thriller	Available
Dicte – Crime Reporter	Denmark	Crime drama	Unavailable
Dopamine	Denmark	Crime drama	Available
The Drought	Spain	Crime thriller	Available
Elite Squad	France	Police drama	Unavailable
Eyewitness	Norway	Crime thriller	Unavailable
Farang: Dead Man Running	Sweden	Crime drama	Available
Fatal Crossing	Denmark	Crime drama	Available
Fear by the Lake	France	Crime thriller	Available
Fenix	The Netherlands	Crime thriller	Available
Flight HS13	The Netherlands	Thriller	Unavailable
Forgotten Girls	France	Crime drama	Unavailable
Framed	The Netherlands	Crime drama	Unavailable
Frozen Sky	Germany	Drama	Unavailable
Fugitives	Chile	Crime drama	Unavailable
Gold Diggers	Russia	Thriller	Available
A Good Family	Finland	Thriller	Available
Greyzone	Denmark, Sweden	Thriller	Available
Grow	Denmark	Crime thriller	Available
Guardian of the Castle	Croatia	Thriller	Available
Heartless	Denmark	Vampire thriller	Unavailable
Helen Dorn	Germany	Crime drama	Unavailable
Hellfjord	Norway	Comedy drama	Unavailable
Hide and Seek	Ukraine	Crime drama	Available
Home Guards	Hungary	Drama	Unavailable
Hostage	Sweden	Thriller	Available
Hotel Adlon	Germany	Drama	Unavailable
Hotel Beau Séjour	Belgium	Supernatural crime thriller	Available
The Hunter	France	Thriller	Unavailable
The Hunter	Italy	Crime drama	Available
Ice Cold Murders: Rocco Schiavone	Italy	Crime drama	Available
Inspector Borowski	Germany	Mystery drama	Available
Inspector Falke	Germany	Crime drama	Available
The Invisibles	Czech Republic	Comedy drama	Unavailable
Just One Look	France	Action thriller	Available
Kabul Kitchen	France	Comedy drama	Unavailable
The King of Warsaw	Poland	Historical crime drama	Available
Killer by the Lake	France	Crime drama	Available
Lanester	France	Mystery drama	Unavailable
The Lawyer	Sweden	Thriller	Available
The Lens	Czech Republic	Crime thriller	Unavailable
Liberty	Denmark	Drama	Available
Lifeline	Spain	Thriller	Available
Line of Separation	Germany	Historical drama	Unavailable
Locked Up	Spain	Prison drama	Available
Lolita Lobosco	Italy	Crime drama	Available
The Lost	Sweden	Crime drama	Available
Luna and Sophie	Germany	Detective / Police procedural	Available
Mafia Only Kills in Summer	Italy	Coming-of-age dark comedy	Available
Mafiosa	France	Crime drama	Unavailable
Magnifica 70	Brazil	Drama	Available
Maltese: The Mafia Detective	Italy	Crime drama	Available
Mama's Angel	Israel	Thriller	Available
Mammon	Norway	Detective drama	Unavailable
Match Day	France	Crime drama	Unavailable
Merciless	Brazil	Psychological crime thriller	Unavailable
Milk and Honey	Israel	Comedy	Unavailable
The Mind of a Murderer	Germany	Crime drama	Unavailable
The Money Shot	France	Drama	Available
Monster	Norway	Thriller	Available
Moscow Noir	Sweden	Thriller	Available
Murder In The Mountains (SOKO Kitzbühel)	Austria	Procedural	seasons 15, 16, 17 Available
New Nurses	Denmark	Historical drama	Available
New Texas	Belgium	Comedy drama	Unavailable
Nick's Law	Germany	Crime drama	Unavailable
Night and Day	Spain	Thriller	Available
No Limit	France	Action thriller	Unavailable
No Second Chance	France	Thriller	Available
Nordic Murders	Germany	Crime drama	Available
Norskov	Denmark	Crime drama	Available
The Other Mother	France	Thriller	Available
Outlier	Norway	Thriller	Available
PAKT	Poland	Political thriller	Available
Partisan	Sweden	Crime thriller	Available
Partners in Crime: Potsdam Homicide	Germany	Detective / Police procedural	Available
The Passenger	France	Crime drama	Available
Philharmonia	France	Psychological thriller	Available
Point Blank	Germany	Crime drama	Unavailable
The Prey	The Netherlands	Drama	Unavailable
Professor T	Belgium	Crime drama	Available
Pure Evil	Argentina	Psychological crime thriller	Unavailable
The Raid	Brazil	Drama	Available
Rebecka Martinsson: Arctic Murders	Sweden	Drama	Available
Reborn	France	Drama	Unavailable
The Red Shadows	France	Crime drama	Available
Resistance	France	Historical drama	Available
Rest In Peace	Croatia	Crime drama	Unavailable
Rough Justice	Belgium	Detective drama	Available
Ride Upon the Storm	Denmark	Drama	Available
The Ring	Netherlands	Crime drama	Available
The River	Norway	Crime drama	Available
Sakho & Mangane	Senegal	Crime drama	Available
The Same Sky	Germany	Spy drama	Available
The Score	Belgium	Coming-of-age drama	Available
Scratch My Back	Belgium	Comedy drama	Unavailable
Seaside Hotel	Denmark	Historical drama	Available
The Sect	Russia	Drama	Available
Shades of Guilt	Germany	Legal thriller	Available
Sommerdahl Murders	Denmark	Crime drama	Available
Son of a B****	Brazil	Comedy drama	Unavailable
Spin	France	Political drama	Unavailable
Sr Avila	Mexico	Family crime drama	Unavailable
Stockholm Requiem	Sweden	Crime drama	Available
The Swingers	The Netherlands	Mystery drama	Available
Tabula Rasa	Belgium	Thriller	Unavailable
Tainted	Brazil	Thriller	Unavailable
The Teacher	Poland	Crime drama	Unavailable
The Team	Denmark	Crime drama	Available
Thicker Than Water	Sweden	Mystery drama	Available
Thou Shalt Not Kill	Italy	Crime drama	Available
Time Is a Killer	France	Psychological thriller	Available
Tony's Revenge	France	Crime drama	Unavailable
Top Dog	Sweden	Legal thriller	Available
The Truth Will Out	Sweden	Crime thriller	Available
The Twelve	Belgium	Legal thriller	Available
Valkyrien	Norway	Drama	Unavailable
Vanished by the Lake	France	Crime drama	Available
A Very Scandi Scandal	Sweden	Crime comedy	Available
When the Dust Settles (Når støvet har lagt sig, 2020)	Denmark	Psychological drama	Available
Witch Hunt	Norway	Thriller	Available
Young and Promising	Norway	Drama	Available

== Reception ==
According to Channel 4, the 11 titles available in the first month attracted 1.1 million views on All 4.
