= Nina Gnädig =

German actress (born 1977)

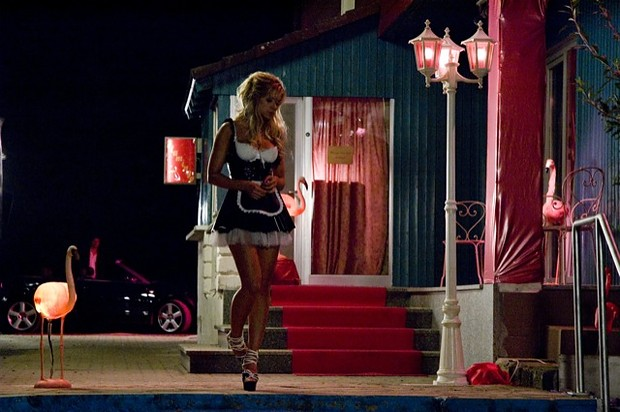
- Nina Gnädig at film "Little Paris".
- Born: 9 December 1977 (age 48); Nürnberg, Germany
- Occupation: Actress
- Years active: 2005–present

Nina-Friederike Gnädig (born 9 December 1977) is a German actress. She is best known for her performance as Anna Badosi in Stuttgart Homicide.

== Selected filmography ==
Film
Year	Title	Role	Notes
2008	Little Paris	Barbie	

TV
Year	Title	Role	Notes
2005–2006	Verliebt in Berlin	Sabrina Hofmann	
2009–2012	Stuttgart Homicide	Anna Badosi	
