= SOKO Rhein-Main =

German crime drama television series

- Genre: Police procedural
- Written by: Matthias Herbert; Sandra Hoerger; Robert Hummel; Ralf Kinder; Uwe Kossmann; Ralf Löhnhardt; Claudia Römer; Lorenz Stassen; David Ungureit
- Directed by: Michael Schneider; Michel Bielawa; Axel de Roche; Patrick Winczewski; Florian Froschmayer; Michael Wenning; Thomas Jahn
- Starring: Marita Marschall; Sven Martinek; Ercan Durmaz; Daniela Preuß; Daniel Wiemer; Francis Fulton-Smith
- Composer: Dirk Leupolz
- Country of origin: Germany
- Original language: German
- No. of seasons: 2
- No. of episodes: 18

Production
- Executive producers: Rainer Jahreis; Norbert Sauer; Michael Wintzer
- Producers: Rainer Jahreis; Norbert Sauer; Susanne Flor; Elke Müller; Dirk Eggers
- Cinematography: Anton Klima; Andreas Zickgraf; Tobias Schmidt; Henning Jessel; Hartmut Lange
- Editors: Ulrike Leipold; Carolyn Haag; Achim Seidel; Thomas Jahn; Sabine Matula; Michael Reysz
- Running time: 45 minutes
- Production company: UFA Film & Medienproduktion

Original release
- Network: ZDF
- Release: 19 April 2006 – 11 December 2007

Related
- SOKO – Der Prozess

SOKO Rhein-Main is a German police procedural television series that premiered on 19 April 2006 on ZDF. The series aired for two seasons and was discontinued in 2008. It is the seventh offshoot of SOKO München, launched in 1978. "SOKO" is an abbreviation of the German word Sonderkommission, which means "special investigative team". The story is set in the region of Rhenish Hesse, focusing on the city of Frankfurt.

Due to differences from other shows in the SOKO franchise, the first season of SOKO Rhein-Main was titled Die Spezialisten: Kripo Rhein-Main (The Specialists: Criminal Police Rhein-Main), and the SOKO moniker was adopted in the second season and later retained for reruns.

== Cast and characters ==
Actor	Character	Rank
Marita Marschall	Susanne Meder	Detective
Sven Martinek	Thomas Wallner	Chief Inspector
Ercan Durmaz	Cem Pamuk	Chief Inspector
Daniela Preuß	Nina Horn	Detective
Daniel Wiemer	Pit Hartmann	Detective
Francis Fulton-Smith	Dr. Johannes Ried	BKA chief

== See also ==
- List of German television series
