= Der Fahnder =

1984–2005 German television series

- Country of origin: Germany
- No. of seasons: 11
- No. of episodes: 197

Production
- Running time: 45 minutes

Original release
- Network: Das Erste
- Release: 14 September 1984 – 29 August 2005

Der Fahnder (Eng. trans. The Investigator/Detective) is a German television crime drama series which was aired between 1984 and 2005.

In the Netherlands, the series was broadcast by the VARA from 3 October 1985.

== Plot ==
The first title character of the series was the investigator Faber. His first name remained largely unmentioned, only very rarely did his girlfriend Susanne address him by his first name Hannes, mostly she also called him Faber. Faber did not wear a uniform and also more often exceeded the official regulations. Faber's official car was a lime-green Ford Granada of the first series, his regular pub was the local Treff of his partner. During Faber's entire time in the series, his most important colleague and comrade-in-arms was the younger and far more observant Max Kühn. With the departure of Faber, who according to the plot emigrated to Ireland with his partner, Kühn also disappeared from the series without further explanation. Both of their superiors were Chief Inspector Norbert Rick, who was the only character to remain in the entire series.

After the departure of Faber and Kühn, the character Schatzschneider (initially just Otto), a civil servant who was still in uniform, who had already been gradually upgraded, moved up to number two. The new title character was Thomas Becker, who had been transferred to the precinct.

== Cast ==
Klaus Wennemann
Hannes Faber (episodes 1–91)
Jörg Schüttauf
Thomas Becker (episodes 92–149)
Michael Lesch
Martin Riemann (episodes 151–175)
Martin Lindow
Thomas Wells (episodes 157–201)
Dietrich Mattausch
Norbert Rick (1984–2005)
Hans-Jürgen Schatz
Max Kühn (1984–1993)
Dieter Pfaff
Otto Schatzschneider (1984–1996)
Barbara Freier
Susanne (Faber's girlfriend) (1984–1993)
Jophi Ries
Gregor Solomon (1993–1995)
George Lenz
Frank Dennert (1993–1996)
Andreas Mannkopff
Franz Behrmann (1993–1996)
Susann Uplegger
Cornelia Seitz (1993–1996)
Thomas Balou Martin
Karlheinz Mischewski (1997–2000)
Sascha Posch
Konstantin Broecker (1997–2005)
Astrid M. Fünderich
Dr. Katharina Winkler (1997–2005)
Andreas Windhuis
Guido Kroppeck (2000–2005)

== See also ==
- List of German television series
