= SOKO Köln =

German crime television series

- Genre: Police procedural
- Written by: various
- Directed by: various
- Starring: Kerstin Landsmann; Thomas Clemens; Lukas Piloty; Anne Schäfer; Christina Plate
- Composers: Stephen Keusch; Oliver Lutz; Steffen Britzke; Andreas Dicke
- Country of origin: Germany
- Original language: German
- No. of seasons: 25
- No. of episodes: 492

Production
- Executive producers: Wolfgang Cimera; Andreas Breyer; Stephan Adolph; Annette Oswald
- Producer: various
- Cinematography: various
- Editor: various
- Running time: 45 minutes
- Production company: Network Movie

Original release
- Network: ZDF
- Release: 22 October 2003

Related
- SOKO – Der Prozess

SOKO Köln (English title: Cologne P.D.) is a German police procedural television series that premiered on 22 October 2003 on ZDF. It is the fourth offshoot of SOKO München, launched in 1978 under the name SOKO 5113. "SOKO" is an abbreviation of the German word Sonderkommission, which means "special investigative team".

== Cast and characters ==
=== Current ===
Actor	Role	Rank	Episodes	Series
Kerstin Landsmann	Vanessa Haas	Detective inspector candidate Detective inspector (from season 8)	1–	1–
Pierre Besson	Matti Wagner	Chief inspector (deputy team leader)	150–	8–
Lukas Piloty	Jonas Fischer	Detective inspector	162–	8–
Tatjana Kästel	Lilly Funke	Detective inspector Chief inspector (team leader) (from season 20)	264–	15–
Yulia Yáñez Schmidt	Dr. Pilar Westphal	Forensic scientist	442–	21–

=== Past ===
Actor	Role	Rank	Episodes	Series
Julia Malik	Carla Schumann	Detective inspector	22–34	2
Hans-Joachim Heist	Zatopek	Chief of police	2–47	1–3
Gundula Rapsch †	Alexandra Gebhardt	Chief inspector (team leader)	1–69	1–4
Mike Hoffmann	Tobias Berger	Detective inspector	1–69	1–4
Jasmin Gerat	Jale Beck	Detective inspector	35–69	3–4
Clelia Sarto	Daniela Fiori	Detective inspector	1–21, 146	1, 7
Jophi Ries	Frank Hansen †	Chief inspector Deputy team leader (from series 5)	1–150	1–8
Steve Windolf	Daniel Winter	Chief inspector	70–161	5–8
Hans-Martin Stier	Ben Schneider	Crime director	1–162	1–8
Lilia Lehner	Julia Marschall	Detective inspector	70–189	5–9
Christian Heller	Dr. Alexander Kern	Prosecutor	170–192	9–10
Sissy Höfferer	Karin Reuter	Chief inspector (team leader)	70–239	5–11
August Wittgenstein	Thomas Prinz			
Christina Plate	Nina Jacobs	Chief inspector	241–263	12
Diana Staehly	Anna Maiwald	Chief inspector	264–351	13-18
Sonja Baum	Helena Jung	Chief inspector	352–417	19–20
Anne Schäfer	Sophia Mückeberg	Detective inspector	190–221,239–263	10–14
Siri Nase	Hanna Bergmann	Detective inspector	222–238	13
Thomas Clemens	Dr. Philip Kraft	Forensic pathologist	35–409	3–21

== Crossover ==
On 3 April 2013, five SOKO teams were brought together for a five-part special titled SOKO – Der Prozess. In it, the teams from Munich, Cologne, Leipzig, Stuttgart, and Wismar have to solve the murder of a police officer. The five episodes were shown across Germany from 30 September to 4 October 2013.

== Episode list ==
=== Season 1 ===
Number (total)	Number (in series)	Episode name	Date of first broadcast
1	1	Kölscher Klüngel	22 October 2003
2	2	Tödlicher Talk	29 October 2003
3	3	Blutige Beichte	5 November 2003
4	4	Elf Freunde sollt ihr sein	12 November 2003
5	5	Zahltag	19 November 2003
6	6	Der letzte Geburtstag	26 November 2003
7	7	Die Mädchenfalle	3 December 2003
8	8	Die Nacht, in der Andy starb	10 December 2003
9	9	Der tote Tourist	17 December 2003
10	10	Pizza für den Paten	30 December 2003
11	11	Je oller, je doller	7 January 2004
12	12	Familienbande	14 January 2004
13	13	Oliver W. – Tod eines Schülers	21 January 2004
14	14	Mietsache Mord	28 January 2004
15	15	Zwischen den Fronten	4 February 2004
16	16	Krieg der Sterne	11 February 2004
17	17	Tod am Bau	18 February 2004
18	18	Flinke Finger	25 February 2004
19	19	Frau im Fadenkreuz	3 March 2004
20	20	Blau Rot Tot	10 March 2004
21	21	Das Verhör	17 March 2004

=== Season 2 ===
Number (total)	Number (in series)	Episode name	Date of first broadcast
22	1	Gegen die Uhr	23 February 2005
23	2	Tod auf der Lula	2 March 2005
24	3	Blondes Gift	16 March 2005
25	4	Liebesgrüsse aus Bombay	23 March 2005
26	5	Du bist nicht allein	30 March 2005
27	6	Bewährungsprobe	6 April 2005
28	7	Wort und Totschlag	13 April 2005
29	8	Tod auf Kredit	20 April 2005
30	9	Alles Lüge	27 April 2005
31	10	Blutiger Buddha	4 May 2005
32	11	Echte Kerle	11 May 2005
33	12	Alte Rechnungen	18 May 2005
34	13	Durch dick und dünn	25 May 2005

=== Season 3 ===
Number (total)	Number (in series)	Episode name	Date of first broadcast
35	1	Der letzte Kunde	20 December 2005
36	2	Santa Mortale	27 December 2005
37	3	Der Minigolfkrieg	3 January 2006
38	4	Der Heckenschütze	10 January 2006
39	5	Der Doppelfehler	17 January 2006
40	6	Späte Liebe	24 January 2006
41	7	Amnesie	31 January 2006
42	8	Die Rache der Elfen	7 February 2006
43	9	Allein unter Nachbarn	21 February 2006
44	10	Kalte Küche	28 February 2006
45	11	Eine Leiche zum Frühstück	7 March 2006
46	12	Letzte Ausfahrt Chorweiler	14 March 2006
47	13	Falsches Spiel	21 March 2006
48	14	Bei Gutachten Mord	28 March 2006
49	15	Der Tote im Wald	4 April 2006
50	16	Die Spur des Jägers	11 April 2006
51	17	Alles auf Sieg	18 April 2006

=== Season 4 ===
Number (total)	Number (in series)	Episode name	Date of first broadcast
52	1	Später Ruhm	9 January 2007
53	2	Alte Freunde	16 January 2007
54	3	Bremsversagen	23 January 2007
55	4	Tod einer Polizistin (90 mins)	26 January 2007
56	5	Tod im Kaufhaus	26 January 2007
57	6	Sondereinsatz	30 January 2007
58	7	Schluss mit Lustig	6 February 2007
59	8	Dicker als Wasser	13 February 2007
60	9	Eine Frage des Vertrauens	20 February 2007
61	10	Bethmanns Fall	27 February 2007
62	11	Mord nach Lehrplan	6 March 2007
63	12	Ein Flirt mit dem Tod	20 March 2007
64	13	Vermisst	27 March 2007
65	14	Die Braut trägt Rot	3 April 2007
66	15	Herzen in Not	10 April 2007
67	16	Alles auf eine Karte	17 April 2007
68	17	Die Tote im Morgengrauen	24 April 2007
69	18	Ein ganz normaler Tag	8 May 2007

=== Season 5 ===
Number (total)	Number (in series)	Episode name	Date of first broadcast
70	1	Aus Mangel an Beweisen	23 September 2008
71	2	Man liebt nur einmal	30 September 2008
72	3	Laufsteg in den Tod	7 October 2008
73	4	Himmelsstürmer	14 October 2008
74	5	Schlafende Hunde	21 October 2008
75	6	Der Pianist	28 October 2008
76	7	Die stumme Zeugin	4 November 2008
77	8	Schatten der Vergangenheit	11 November 2008
78	9	Finger am Abzug	18 November 2008
79	10	Gefrorene Tränen	25 November 2008
80	11	Zimmer mit Leiche	2 December 2008
81	12	Mord im Hallenbad	9 December 2008
82	13	Mörder an Bord	16 December 2008
83	14	Warum musste Bubi Waldner sterben?	23 December 2008
84	15	Der letzte Auftrag	30 December 2008
85	16	Abgeschossen	6 January 2009
86	17	Damenwahl	13 January 2009
87	18	Lackschäden	27 January 2009
88	19	Tod dem Tyrannen	3 February 2009
89	20	Zu nah am Feuer	10 February 2009
90	21	In den besten Familien	17 February 2009
91	22	Das Wunderkind	24 February 2009
92	23	Das letzte Kölsch	3 March 2009
93	24	Doppeltes Spiel	17 March 2009
94	25	Mord im Brauhaus	24 March 2009
95	26	Das Gesetz der Serie	31 March 2009
96	27	Die schöne Griet	7 April 2009
97	28	Bauerntod	14 April 2009
98	29	Tod eines Aupair-Mädchens	21 April 2009
99	30	Ein teuflischer Plan	28 April 2009

=== Season 6 ===
Number (total)	Number (in series)	Episode name	Date of first broadcast
100	1	Bis an den Hals	8 September 2009
101	2	Ein klarer Fall	15 September 2009
102	3	Mein Freund der Mörder	22 September 2009
103	4	Liebesverrat	29 September 2009
104	5	Der Fluch der bösen Tat	6 October 2009
105	6	Wer sich in Gefahr begibt	13 October 2009
106	7	Todesfahrer	20 October 2009
107	8	Die letzte Reise	27 October 2009
108	9	Mann aus Stein	3 November 2009
109	10	Doppelgrab	10 November 2009
110	11	Nicht von schlechten Eltern	17 November 2009
111	12	Tod im Zoo	24 November 2009
112	13	Trilogie des Todes	1 December 2009
113	14	Tod auf dem Rhein	8 December 2009
114	15	Familienglück	15 December 2009
115	16	Tod einer Schriftstellerin	22 December 2009
116	17	Auf der Flucht	29 December 2009
117	18	Eine Landpartie	5 January 2010
118	19	Geister der Vergangenheit	12 January 2010
119	20	Die Frau im hellen Mantel	26 January 2010
120	21	Wer Wind sät	2 February 2010
121	22	Mörder Alaaf!	9 February 2010
122	23	Entführt	23 February 2010
123	24	Am seidenen Faden	2 March 2010
124	25	Schuldig	16 March 2010
125	26	Preis der Schönheit	23 March 2010
126	27	Krieg im Kleingarten	30 March 2010
127	28	Mord im Steinbruch	6 April 2010
128	29	Vorsicht, Falle!	13 April 2010
129	30	Ein echter Schuss	20 April 2010

=== Season 7 ===
Number (total)	Number (in series)	Episode name	Date of first broadcast
130	1	Mord zartbitter	3 November 2010
131	2	Das Vermächtnis	9 November 2010
132	3	Katz und Maus	16 November 2010
133	4	Mitten ins Herz	23 November 2010
134	5	Offene Rechnung	30 November 2010
135	6	Ein Bund fürs Leben	7 December 2010
136	7	Das Attentat	14 December 2010
137	8	Ein ehrenwertes Haus	21 December 2010
138	9	Ausgekocht	28 December 2010
139	10	Pokerfieber	4 January 2011
140	11	Die Berufenen	11 January 2011
141	12	Durch fremde Fenster	18 January 2011
142	13	Der Feind an meiner Seite	25 January 2011
143	14	Klassentreffen	1 February 2011
144	15	Sterbender Schwan	8 February 2011
145	16	Aufgeflogen!	15 February 2011
146	17	Gegen die Zeit	22 February 2011
147	18	Transit	1 March 2011
148	19	Näher mein Gott zu dir	8 March 2011
149	20	Hexen, Huren, Henker	15 March 2011

=== Season 8 ===
Number (total)	Number (in series)	Episode name	Date of first broadcast
150	1	Der letzte Einsatz	18 October 2011
151	2	Früchte des Zorns	25 October 2011
152	3	Playback	1 November 2011
153	4	Auf immer und ewig	8 November 2011
154	5	Operation Mord	15 November 2011
155	6	Gesichtskontrolle	22 November 2011
156	7	Der Todespfeil	29 November 2011
157	8	Waschen, schneiden, töten	6 December 2011
158	9	Die falsche Frau	13 December 2011
159	10	Mord im Veedel	20 December 2011
160	11	Der kurze Ruhm des Alexander K.	27 December 2011
161	12	In tödlicher Beziehung	3 January 2012
162	13	Bauernopfer	10 January 2012
163	14	Endstation Mord	17 January 2012
164	15	Ein Schuss, kein Tor	24 January 2012
165	16	Die Römer von Bocklemünd	31 January 2012
166	17	Zeugin in Angst	7 February 2012
167	18	Zahn um Zahn	14 February 2012
168	19	Sonne, Mord und Sterne	21 February 2012
169	20	Helden	28 February 2012

=== Season 9 ===
Number (total)	Number (in series)	Episode name	Date of first broadcast
170	1	Mord nach Schulschluss	9 October 2012
171	2	Der letzte Welpe	16 October 2012
172	3	Silvanas Geheimnis	23 October 2012
173	4	Fischer gegen Fischer	30 October 2012
174	5	Der Mann auf dem Dach	6 November 2012
175	6	Tödliche Verkettung	13 November 2012
176	7	Mit Hieb und Stich	20 November 2012
177	8	Bis zum letzten Atemzug	27 November 2012
178	9	Blaulicht	4 December 2012
179	10	Die Akte Becker	11 December 2012
180	11	Unter Verdacht	18 December 2012
181	12	In der Falle	8 January 2013
182	13	Mord nach Mitternacht	15 January 2013
183	14	Kanzlerklau	22 January 2013
184	15	Atemlos	29 January 2013
185	16	Verschwunden	5 February 2013
186	17	Unter Druck	19 February 2013
187	18	Tödliche Sprechstunde	26 February 2013
188	19	Das Bankgeheimnis	5 March 2013
189	20	Der Kinderzimmermillionär	12 March 2013

=== SOKO – Der Prozess ===
Titel	Erstausstrahlung im ZDF
Der Prozess	1 October 2013

=== Season 10 ===
Number (total)	Number (in series)	Episode name	Date of first broadcast
190	2	Der stille Mord	8 October 2013
191	3	Die unbekannte Freundin	15 October 2013
192	4	Späte Mädchen	22 October 2013
193	5	Tod im Stall	29 October 2013
194	6	Das Mädchen mit dem Flügelpferd	5 November 2013
195	7	Tod eines Entführers	12 November 2013
196	8	Im Schutz der Nacht	19 November 2013
197	9	Die Gunst der Stunde	26 November 2013
198	10	Ein Fall für Camilla	3 December 2013

=== Season 11 ===
Number (total)	Number (in series)	Episode name	Date of first broadcast
214	1	Eine Frage der Gerechtigkeit	14 October 2014
215	2	Du sollst nicht töten	21 October 2014
216	3	Durststrecke	28 October 2014
217	4	Schutzengel	4 November 2014
218	5	Auf der schiefen Bahn	11 November 2014
219	6	Tanz ohne Wiederkehr	18 November 2014
220	7	Falschgeld	25 November 2014
221	8	Väter und Söhne	2 December 2014
222	9	Die Unverbesserlichen	9 December 2014
223	10	Tod am Telefon	16 December 2014
224	11	Schlagerterror	23 December 2014
225	12	Der Büchermord	30 December 2014
226	13	Tod eines Rappers	13 January 2015
227	14	Der stumme Tenor	20 January 2015
228	15	Der Friedhofsmord	27 January 2015
229	16	Die Frau im Bus	3 February 2015
230	17	Verfluchte Millionen	10 February 2015
231	18	Camilla und die tote Nonne	17 February 2015
232	19	Mord am Hochsitz	24 February 2015
233	20	Partitur eines Todes	3 March 2015
234	21	Der Fluch der Libelle	10 March 2015
235	22	Ihr letzter Wille	17 March 2015
236	23	Kein Weg zurück	24 March 2015
237	24	Rasender Puls	31 March 2015
238	25	Falscher Fuffziger	7 April 2015

=== Season 12 ===
Number (total)	Number (in series)	Episode name	Date of first broadcast
239	1	Das letzte Versprechen	6 October 2015
240	2	Tod durch Ertrinken	13 October 2015
241	3	Vorurteile	20 October 2015
242	4	Nackte Tatsachen	27 October 2015
243	5	Bickendorfer Büdchen	3 November 2015
244	6	Der Kölschbaron	10 November 2015
245	7	Schatten am Fenster	17 November 2015
246	8	Blutspuren	24 November 2015
247	9	Zombie mit Sahne	1 December 2015
248	10	Knockout	8 December 2015
249	11	Blutige Abrechnung	15 December 2015
250	12	Weiterbildung Mord	22 December 2015
251	13	Alte Wunden	29 December 2015
252	14	Nico	5 January 2016
253	15	Chancenlos	12 January 2016
254	16	Verstummt	19 January 2016
255	17	Nach so vielen Jahren	26 January 2016
256	18	Scham	2 February 2016
257	19	Verhängnisvolles Date	9 February 2016
258	20	Der einzige Ausweg	16 February 2016
259	21	Hammerfrauen	23 February 2016
260	22	Außer Kontrolle	1 March 2016
261	23	Blutiges Brautkleid	8 March 2016
262	24	Kruppkas letzte Fahrt	15 March 2016
263	25	Tödlicher Alleingang	23 March 2016

=== Season 13 ===
Number (total)	Number (in series)	Episode name	Date of first broadcast
264	1	Unerwartete Begegnung	4 October 2016
265	2	Zimmer frei	11 October 2016
266	3	Tödliche Therapie	18 October 2016
267	4	Mörderisches Wochenende	25 October 2016
268	5	Tödliche Melodie	1 November 2016
269	6	Im Zwielicht	8 November 2016
270	7	Loverboy	15 November 2016
271	8	Buchstabiere Mord	22 November 2016
272	9	Wetten, dass ...?	29 November 2016
273	10	Die Beatles von Bocklemünd	6 December 2016
274	11	Tödliche Lügen	13 December 2016
275	12	Krüger ist tot!	20 December 2016
276	13	Vier Freundinnen und ein Todesfall	27 December 2016
277	14	Tod eines Lebenskünstlers	3 January 2017
278	15	Schmutzige Wäsche	10 January 2017
279	16	Verbrannt	17 January 2017
280	17	Der Mann mit der Geige	24 January 2017
281	18	Letzte Meile	31 January 2017
282	19	Arrivederci Bruno	7 February 2017
283	20	Messerscharf	14 February 2017
284	21	Schwere Jungs	21 February 2017
285	22	Der Stinker	28 February 2017
286	23	Alte Meister	7 March 2017
287	24	Eingeschlossen	14 March 2017

== See also ==
- List of German television series
