= SOKO Hamburg =

German crime television series

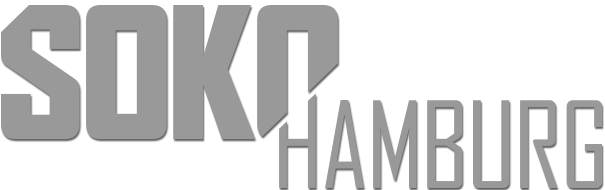
- Series logo
- Genre: Police procedural
- Written by: various
- Directed by: various
- Starring: Marek Erhardt; Garry Fischmann; Pegah Ferydoni; Paula Schramm; Anna von Haebler; Marla Erhardt; Mirko Lang
- Composers: Johannes Brandt; Hansjörg Kohli; Florian Riedl
- Country of origin: Germany
- Original language: German
- No. of seasons: 6
- No. of episodes: 67

Production
- Producer: various
- Cinematography: various
- Editor: various
- Running time: 43 minutes
- Production company: Network Movie Film-und Fernsehproduktion

Original release
- Network: ZDF
- Release: 27 March 2018 – 1 April 2024

Related
- SOKO – Der Prozess

SOKO Hamburg (English title: Hamburg Homicide) is a German police procedural television series broadcast on ZDF that premiered on 27 March 2018 and ended on 1 April 2024. It is the ninth offshoot of SOKO München, launched in 1978. "SOKO" is an abbreviation of the German word Sonderkommission, which means "special investigative team". The show is filmed in Schleswig-Holstein, Hamburg, and Lower Saxony

In January 2023, ZDF announced that SOKO Hamburg would be ending in 2024.

== See also ==
- List of German television series
