= SOKO Potsdam =

German crime television series

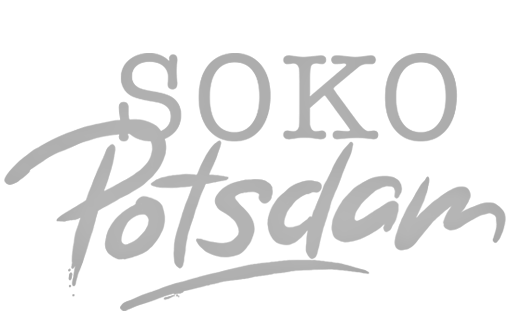
- Series logo
- Genre: Police procedural
- Written by: Richard Kropf; Hanno Hackfort; Bob Konrad; Krystof Hybl; Anne Katrin Mascher; Stefan Scheich; Robert Dannenberg; Stefan Rogall
- Directed by: various
- Starring: Michael Lott; Yung Ngo; Bernd Stegemann; Anja Pahl; Skandar Amini; Agnes Decker
- Composers: Leonard Petersen; Jens Oettrich; Daniel Freundlieb
- Country of origin: Germany
- Original language: German
- No. of seasons: 8
- No. of episodes: 90

Production
- Executive producers: Gerda Müller; Michael Tinney; Lasse Scharpen
- Producers: Jochen Cremer; Lisa Keiner; Marie Therese Dalke; Georg Bonhoeffer
- Cinematography: various
- Editor: various
- Running time: 43 minutes
- Production company: Bantry Bay Productions

Original release
- Network: ZDF
- Release: 24 September 2018

SOKO Potsdam is a German police procedural television series that premiered on 24 September 2018 on ZDF. It is the tenth offshoot of SOKO München, launched in 1978. "SOKO" is an abbreviation of the German word Sonderkommission, which means "special investigative team". The show revolves around a police team that investigates murders and other serious crimes in the city of Potsdam and surrounding areas. The first four seasons air as Luna + Sophie in the US.

== Cast and characters ==
Current

Actor	Character	Rank	Since
Michael Lott	Bernhard Henschel	Criminal council Kriminalrat	2018–
Yung Ngo	Thomas Brandner	Forensic technician	2018–
Bernd Stegemann	Werner Vense	Coroner	2018–
Anja Pahl	Tamara Meurer	Chief inspector	2021–
Skandar Amini	Samir Amari	Detective inspector	2021–
Agnes Decker	Pauline Hobrecht	Chief inspector	2022–

Former

Actor	Character	Rank	Since
Katrin Jaehne	Sophie Pohlmann	Chief inspector	33 episodes 2018–2021
Omar El-Saeidi	David Grünbaum	Criminal superintendent	37 episodes 2018–2021
Hendrik von Bültzingslöwen	Christoph Westermann	Criminal superintendent	37 episodes 2018–2021
Caroline Erikson	Luna Kunath	Chief inspector	45 episodes 2018–2021
Sönke Schnitzer	Robert Pohlmann		2018–2021

== Luna + Sophie ==
In 2023, PBS began streaming the first three seasons of the series under the title Luna + Sophie, with English subtitles. Presented by Walter Presents, a British video-on-demand service that streams foreign programs with English subtitles, the show's title is derived from the names of the two original protagonists.

In 2024, season 4 began streaming, retaining the Lune + Sophie name even though Katrin Jaehne (Sophie) had left the series and Anja Pahl joined as Tamara Meurer. Four episodes into the season, Omar El-Saeidi (David Grünbaum) and Hendrik von Bültzingslöwen (Christoph Westermann) simultaneously left the series, with both characters getting the same promotion.

Due to the cast changes in subsequent seasons of SOKO Potsdam, including the departure of Caroline Erikson, who portrayed Luna, Walter Presents uses the title Partners in Crime: Potsdam Homicide for season 5.

== See also ==
- List of German television series
