= Sven Rissmann =

German politician (born 1978)

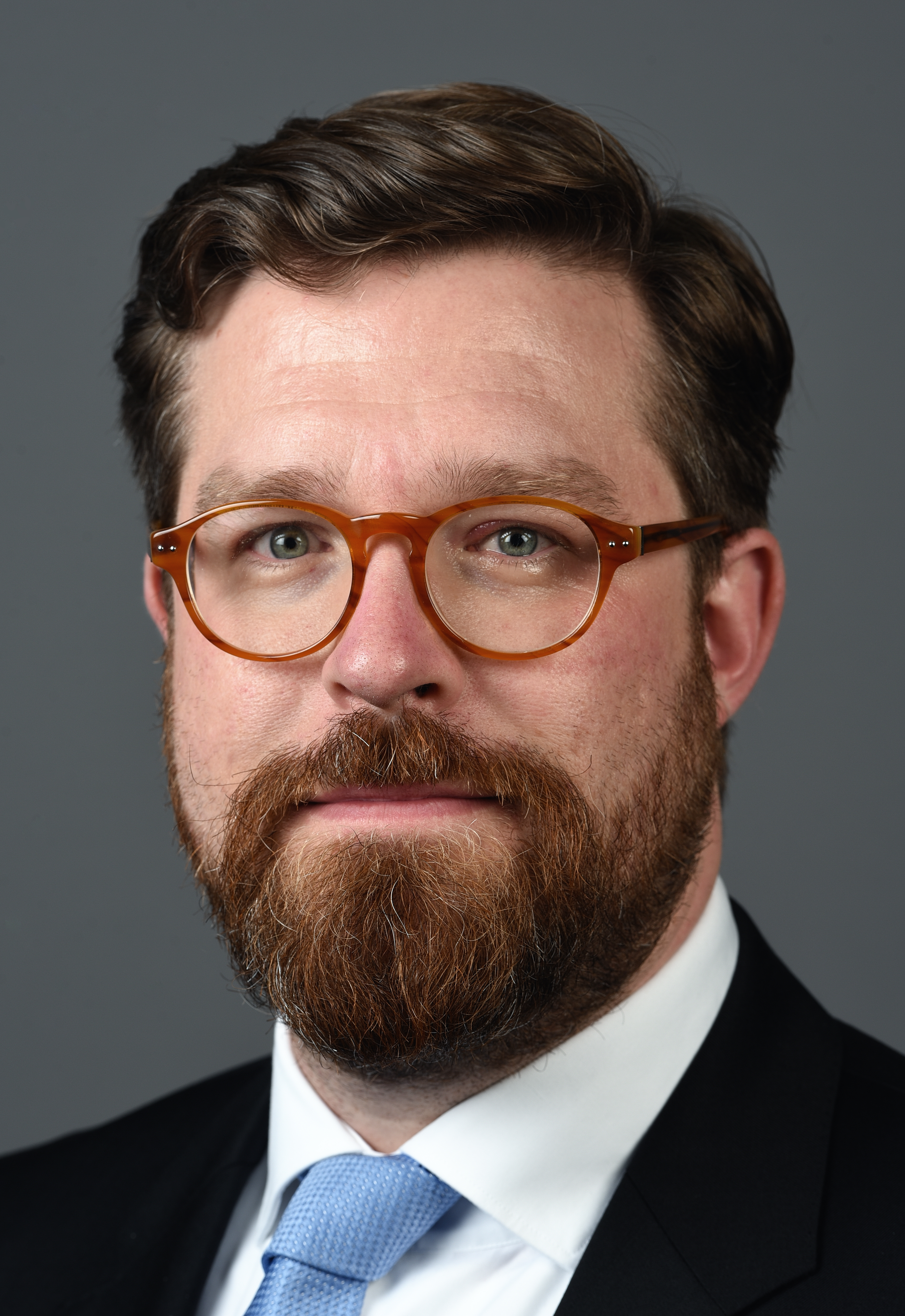
- Rissmann in 2017

Member of the Abgeordnetenhaus of Berlin
- Incumbent
- Assumed office 26 October 2006

Personal details
- Born: 1978 (age 47–48)
- Party: Christian Democratic Union (since 1995)

Sven Rissmann (born 1978) is a German politician serving as a member of the Abgeordnetenhaus of Berlin since 2006. He has served as chairman of the Christian Democratic Union in Mitte since 2017.
