= SOKO Stuttgart =

German television series

- Genre: Police procedural
- Starring: Peter Ketnath; Nina-Friederike Gnädig; Benjamin Strecker; Mike Zaka Sommerfeldt; Astrid M. Fünderich; Sylta Fee Wegmann; Karl Kranzkowski; Eva Maria Bayerwaltes; Jasmin Gassmann; Anna Bullard-Werner
- Theme music composer: Uwe Schenk
- Composers: Günther Illi; Peter Gromer
- Country of origin: Germany
- Original language: German
- No. of seasons: 18
- No. of episodes: 416

Production
- Producers: Torsten Lenkeit; Oliver Vogel
- Camera setup: Thomas C. Weber; Pascal Rémond
- Running time: 45 minutes
- Production company: Bavaria Film

Original release
- Network: ZDF
- Release: 12 November 2009 – present

Related
- SOKO – Der Prozess

SOKO Stuttgart (English title: Stuttgart Homicide) is a German police procedural television series that premiered on 12 November 2009 on ZDF. It is the eighth offshoot of SOKO München, launched in 1978 under the name SOKO 5113. "SOKO" is an abbreviation of the German word Sonderkommission, which means "special investigative team".

The first season of Stuttgart Homicide, consisting of twenty episodes, aired on ZDF from November 2009. In February 2022, filming began on the fourteenth season, made up of twenty-five episodes.

== Crossover ==
On 3 April 2013, five SOKO teams were brought together for a five-part special titled SOKO – Der Prozess. In it, the teams from Munich, Cologne, Leipzig, Stuttgart, and Wismar have to solve the murder of a police officer. The five episodes were shown across Germany from 30 September to 4 October 2013.

== See also ==
- List of German television series
