= SOKO Wismar =

German crime drama television series

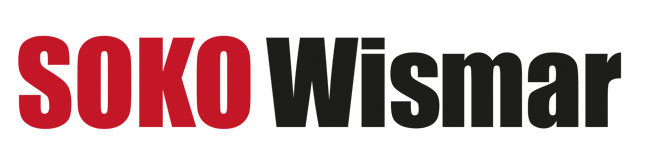
- Series logo
- Genre: Police procedural
- Written by: various
- Directed by: various
- Starring: Udo Kroschwald; Katharina Blaschke; Silke Matthias; Dominic Boeer; Nike Fuhrmann; Stella Hinrichs; Gustavs Gailus
- Theme music composer: Udo Lindenberg
- Composers: Michael Dübe; Kerim König; Andreas Kaiser; Dirk Leupolz; Sibin Vassilev; Andreas Koslik
- Country of origin: Germany
- Original language: German
- No. of seasons: 23
- No. of episodes: 525

Production
- Executive producers: Dagmar Rosenbauer; Andreas Knoblauch; Gregori Winkowski; Theo Leipert; Moritz Hansen
- Producer: various
- Production locations: Wismar, Berlin
- Cinematography: various
- Editor: various
- Running time: 45 minutes
- Production company: Real Film Berlin

Original release
- Network: ZDF
- Release: 6 October 2004

Related
- SOKO – Der Prozess

SOKO Wismar is a German police procedural television series that premiered on 6 October 2004 on ZDF. It is the fifth offshoot of SOKO München, launched in 1978 under the name SOKO 5113. "SOKO" is an abbreviation of the German word Sonderkommission, which means "special investigative team".

== Synopsis ==
Under the leadership of First Chief Inspector Jan Reuter, Chief Inspector Lars Pöhlmann, Chief Inspector Karoline Joost, and Chief of Police Paula Moorkamp, a police team investigates criminal cases in the north German town of Wismar. Assisting the team are forensic scientist Roswitha Prinzler, Latvian exchange officer Edgars "Eddi" Jansons, and coroner Helene Sturbeck.

== Production ==
SOKO Wismar is produced by Real Film Berlin, a subsidiary of Studio Hamburg. Filming takes place both in Wismar and its surroundings as well as in Berlin. The World Heritage Sites of Wismar's old town and its harbour often serve as filming locations. The entrance to the police station is actually the entrance to the Hospital of the Holy Ghost. The inside of the station is filmed at Adlershof Studios, in Berlin.

== Crossover ==
On 3 April 2013, five SOKO teams were brought together for a five-part special titled SOKO – Der Prozess. In it, the teams from Munich, Cologne, Leipzig, Stuttgart, and Wismar have to solve the murder of a police officer. The five episodes were shown across Germany from 30 September to 4 October 2013.

== Cast and characters ==
Current

Actor	Character	Rank	Since
Udo Kroschwald	Jan Reuter	First chief inspector	2004–
Katharina Blaschke	Dr. Helene Sturbeck	Coroner / ER doctor	2005–
Silke Matthias	Silke Schwarz / Roswitha Prinzler	Forensic scientist	2006–11 / 2011–
Dominic Boeer	Lars Pöhlmann	Chief of police / Chief inspector	2007–11 / 2015–
Nike Fuhrmann	Karoline Joost	Chief inspector	2018–
Stella Hinrichs	Paula Moorkamp	Chief of police	2021–
Gustavs Gailus	Edgars "Eddi" Jansons	Latvian exchange officer	2022–

== See also ==
- List of German television series
