= Kerstin Landsmann =

German actress

- Born: 21 May 1977 (age 49); Düsseldorf, North Rhine-Westphalia, West Germany
- Occupation: Actress
- Spouse: Dietmar Löffler
- Children: 1

Kerstin Landsmann (born 21 May 1977) is a German actress and stuntwoman.

== Career ==
Landsmann is the daughter of a sausage maker from Dormagen. She graduated from Erzbischöflichen Gymnasium Marienberg in Neuss.

As a child, Landsmann modeled and starred in commercials. After graduating from school, she portrayed Katharina "Kati" von Sterneck in the Das Erste daily soap opera Verbotene Liebe from 1995 to 2001. Since 2003, she has been part of the regular line-up of Cologne P.D.

== Personal life ==
On 5 September 2004, Landsmann married stuntman Dietmar Löffler. In 2006, she gave birth to a son after having had a stillbirth a year earlier. Today, she is in a relationship with her fellow actor Steve Windolf.

Landsmann had herself photographed for Max magazine in May 1997 and for German Playboy in November 2008, each including a cover appearance.
