= Sylta Fee Wegmann =

German actress (born 1987)

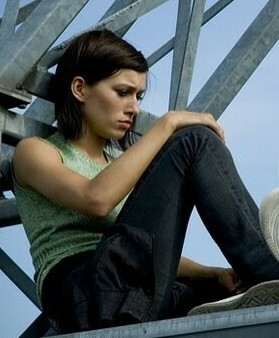
- Wegmann in Little Paris (2008)
- Born: 7 March 1987 (age 39); East Berlin, East Germany
- Occupation: Actress
- Years active: 2002–present

Sylta Fee Wegmann (born 7 March 1987) is a German actress. She has appeared in more than thirty films since 2002.
