= Leipzig Homicide =

German crime drama television series

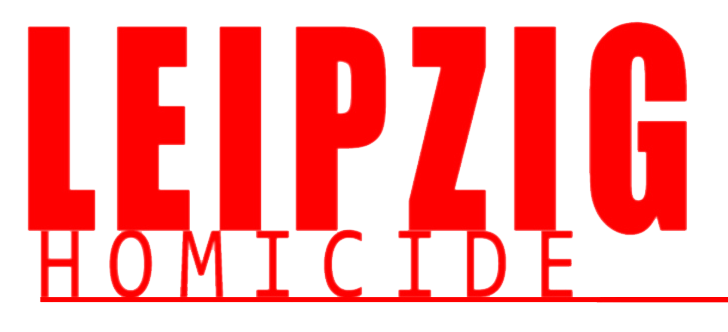
- Series logo
- Also known as: SOKO Leipzig
- Genre: Police procedural
- Written by: Frank Koopmann; Roland Heep; Jeanet Pfitzer; Axel Hildebrand; Eva Zahn; Volker A. Zahn; Markus Hoffmann; Uwe Kossmann
- Directed by: Oren Schmuckler; Patrick Winczewski; Michel Bielawa; Jörg Mielich; Robert del Maestro; Christoph Eichhorn; Herwig Fischer
- Starring: Andreas Schmidt-Schaller (2001–2023); Marco Girnth (2001–2026); Melanie Marschke (2001–); Gabriel Merz (2001–2006); Tyron Ricketts (2006–2009); Pablo Sprungala (2009–2012); Steffen Schroeder (2012–2022); Nilam Farooq (2013–2019); Amy Mußul (2019–); Johannes Hendrik Langer (2022–); Simon Böer (2026-)
- Theme music composer: Georg Kleinebreil
- Composers: Andreas Hoge; George Kochbeck; Philipp E. Kümpel; Andreas Moisa
- Country of origin: Germany
- Original language: German
- No. of seasons: 27
- No. of episodes: 531

Production
- Executive producers: Henriette Lippold; Katharina Rietz
- Producer: Tanya Momella Mallory
- Production locations: Leipzig (Reclam-Carrée, Inselstraße)
- Cinematography: Henning Jessel; Constantin Kesting; Matthias Papenmeier
- Editor: Matthias Pfeifer
- Camera setup: Film; multiple-camera
- Running time: 44 minutes
- Production companies: UFA Fernsehproduktion (2001–2013); UFA Fiction (2014–)

Original release
- Network: ZDF
- Release: 31 January 2001 – present

Related
- SOKO – Der Prozess, "Proof of Life"

Leipzig Homicide (SOKO Leipzig) is a German crime drama television series first broadcast on 31 January 2001 on ZDF. More than 400 episodes have been screened since. On 12 November 2008, the first of a two-part crossover between SOKO Leipzig and British police procedural The Bill, titled "Proof of Life", was aired, with the same version being shown on both ZDF and British television network ITV. Soko Leipzig is the second offshoot of SOKO München, launched in 1978 under the name SOKO 5113. "SOKO" is an abbreviation of the German word Sonderkommission, which means "special investigative team".

== Synopsis ==
The series follows the investigative work of a special commission of the Leipzig police, focused on serious crimes such as murder. The show's original team consists of Hajo Trautzschke, Jan Maybach, Ina Zimmermann, and Miguel Alvarez. Alvarez is killed and replaced by Patrick Grimm, until his departure for Africa, when his father dies. Detective inspector-candidate Vincent Becker is Patrick's replacement. He lives with his superior, Hajo Trautzschke, and her daughter, Leni, a journalist who marries Jan Maybach and with whom she has a daughter, Charlotte. Maybach has a son named "Benni" with his first wife. A child at the beginning of the series, Benni later becomes an emergency physician. Leni and Jan later divorce. Zimmermann gives birth to a son, Paul. She gets involved with several men during the series, including Maybach, who dies in season 26.

After Becker moves to Costa Rica, Tom Kowalski joins the team for nearly ten years. He breaks the rules and creates conflict with Hajo and is demoted. Hajo eventually retires, making occasional appearances as Charlotte's grandfather. Zimmermann becomes the team's new leader.

Meanwhile, team assistant Olivia Fareedi becomes a permanent member, until her move to Berlin. Kim Nowak leaves after Kowalski's departure. Moritz Brenner joins the team. Maybach is nearly killed multiple times during the series. He is fatally shot while investigating the man who killed Alvarez and dies in the arms of his boss and lover, Zimmermann. Zimmermann later avenges Maybach's murder, fatally shooting the killer while saving Nowak's life.

The team is supported by coroners Sabine Rossi and Mara Stein as well as laboratory assistant Lorenz Rettig and prosecutor Alexander Binz. Dagmar Schnee assists the team in cases concerning sexual offenses.

== Crossovers ==
On 3 April 2013, five SOKO teams were brought together for a five-part special titled SOKO – Der Prozess. In it, the teams from Munich, Cologne, Leipzig, Stuttgart, and Wismar have to solve the murder of a police officer. The five episodes were shown across Germany from 30 September to 4 October 2013.

A crossover episode with SOKO Donau, titled "Der vierte Mann", was broadcast on ORF on 2 November 2019 and ZDF on 8 November 2019. The screenplay was based on a true story related to the Viennese political activist Rudolfine Steindling.

== Cast and characters ==
=== Current ===
| Actor | Role | Function | Seasons | Years |
| Melanie Marschke | Ina Zimmermann | chief inspector | 1– | 2001– |
| Amy Mußul | Kim Nowak | detective inspector | 19 – | 2019– |
| Johannes Hendrik Langer | Moritz Brenner | detective inspector | 22– | 2022– |
| Simon Böer | Dirk Trebbe | senior inspector | 26- | 2026- |
| Anna Stieblich | Prof. Dr. Sabine Rossi | coroner | 10– | 2009– |
| Michael Rotschopf | Dr. Alexander Binz | prosecutor | 11– | 2011– |
| Judith Sehrbrock | Dr. Mara Stein | coroner | 11– | 2011– |
| Daniel Steiner | Lorenz Rettig | laboratory assistant | 12– | 2012– |
| Petra Kleinert | Dagmar Schnee | chief inspector (vice squad) | 13– | 2013– |
| Caroline Scholze | Leni Trautzschke (formerly Maybach) | daughter of Hajo, ex-wife of Jan | 1– | 2001– |
| Maximilian Klas | Benni Maybach | emergency physician, son of Jan | 1– | 2001– |

=== Former ===
| Actor | Role | Function | Seasons | Years |
| Andreas Schmidt-Schaller | Hajo Trautzschke | chief inspector | 1–23 | 2001–2023 |
| Marco Girnth | Jan Maybach † | chief inspector | 1–26 | 2001–2026 |
| Gabriel Merz | Miguel Alvarez † | detective inspector | 1–7 | 2001–2006 |
| Tyron Ricketts | Patrick Diego Grimm | detective inspector | 7–10 | 2006–2009 |
| Pablo Sprungala | Vincent Becker | detective inspector-candidate | 10–12 | 2009–2012 |
| Anne Arzenbacher | Meike Schwarz | police master | 5–6, 8, 13 | 2005–2006, 2008, 2012 |
| Nilam Farooq | Olivia Fareedi | detective inspector | 13–19 | 2013–2019 |
| Steffen Schroeder | Tom Kowalski | detective inspector | 12–22 | 2012–2022 |
| Silke Heise | Dr. Sandra Schönfeld | coroner | 1–3 | 2001–2003 |
| Margrit Sartorius | Dr. Kathrin Conradi | coroner | 3–11 | 2003–2010 |
| Michael Brandner | Dr. Manfred Woernle | police senior councillor | 11–13, 16 | 2010–2012, 2015 |

== Episodes ==
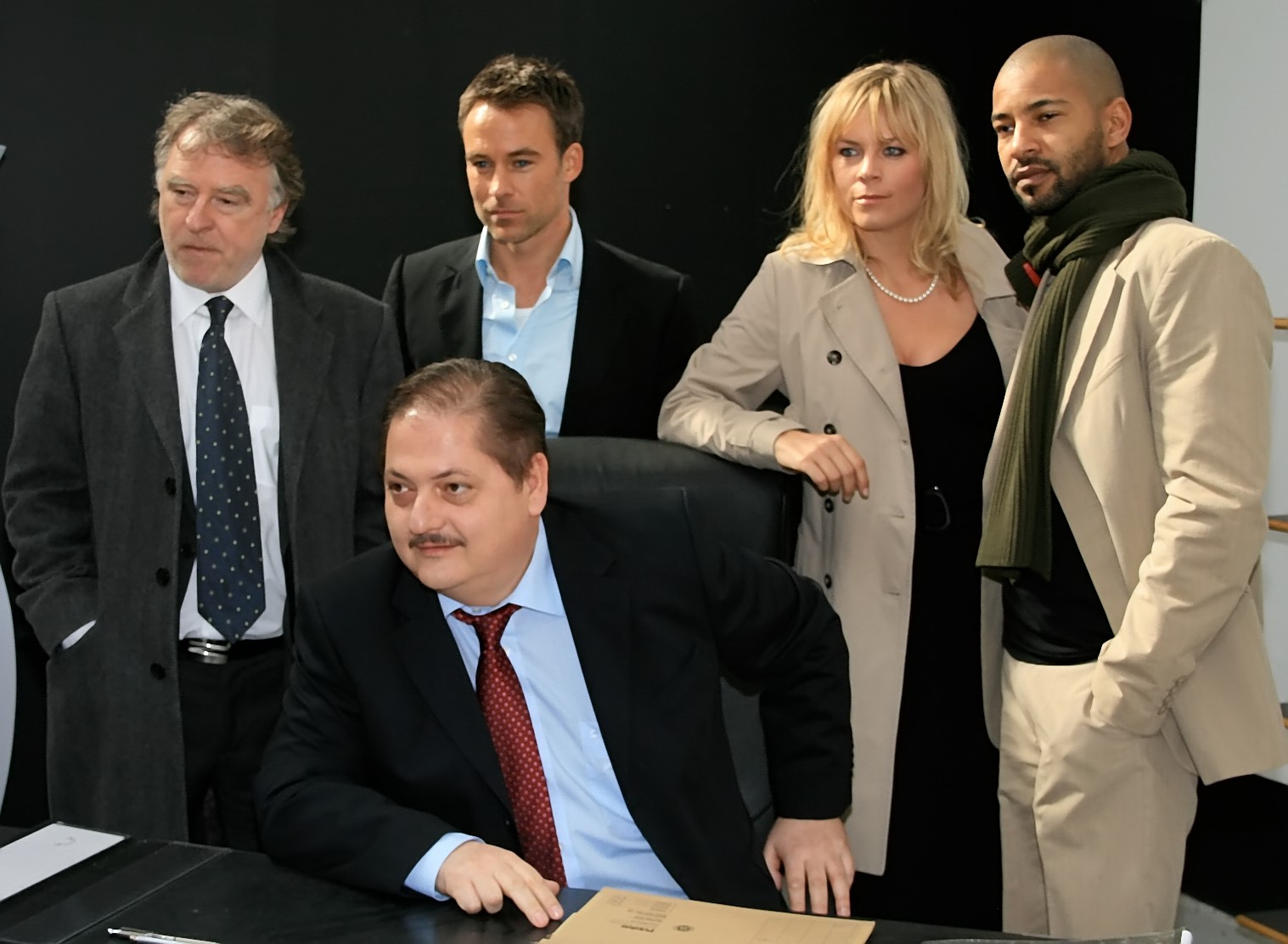
Main cast of SOKO Leipzig (2006–2009)

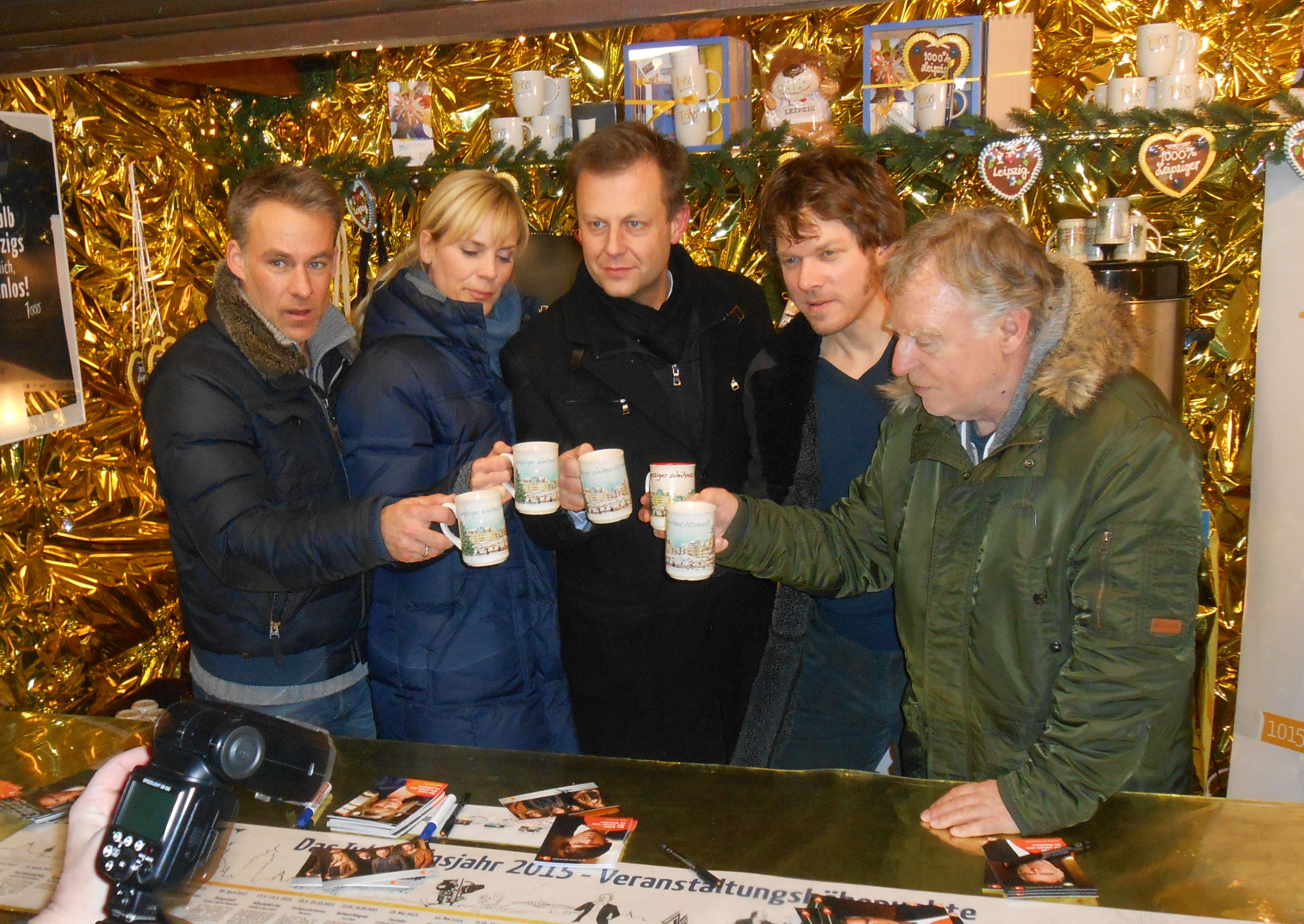
Main cast of SOKO Leipzig (2012–2021)

| Season | Episodes | Originally aired (Germany) | |
| Season | Episodes | Season premiere | Season finale |
|---|---|---|---|
| 1 | 12 | 31 January 2001 | 18 April 2001 |
| 2 | 10 | 23 January 2002 | 27 March 2002 |
| 3 | 18 | 25 September 2002 | 28 March 2003 |
| 4 | 20 | 17 October 2003 | 2 April 2004 |
| 5 | 11 | 17 December 2004 | 18 March 2005 |
| 6 | 21 | 16 September 2005 | 19 May 2006 |
| 7 | 15 | 29 September 2006 | 19 January 2007 |
| 8 | 16 | 24 October 2007 | 11 April 2008 |
| 9 | 31 | 3 October 2008 | 5 June 2009 |
| 10 | 18 | 4 September 2009 | 26 March 2010 |
| 11 | 23 | 24 September 2010 | 11 March 2011 |
| 12 | 23 | 14 October 2011 | 30 March 2012 |
| 13 | 22 | 16 November 2012 | 22 March 2013 |
| SOKO – Der Prozess | 5 | 30 September 2013 | 4 Oktober 2013 |
| 14 | 20 | 25 October 2013 | 21 February 2014 |
| 15 | 21 | 19 September 2014 | 13 February 2015 |
| 16 | 20 | 2 October 2015 | 19 February 2016 |
| 17 | 26 | 16 September 2016 | 24 February 2017 |
| 18 | 16 | 13 October 2017 | 16 February 2018 |
| 19 | 22 | 14 September 2018 | 22 February 2019 |
| 20 | 14 | 18 October 2019 | 14 February 2020 |
| SOKO – Der vierte Mann | 1 | 8 November 2019 | |
| 21 | 22 | 28 August 2020 | 5 March 2021 |
| 22 | 24 | 27 August 2021 | 18 February 2022 |
| 23 | 27 | 9 September 2022 | 17 March 2023 |
| 24 | 23 | 1 September 2023 | 23 February 2024 |
| Special: Goldenes Blut | 1 | 16 August 2024 | |
| 25 | 25 | 27 September 2024 | 25 April 2025 |
| 26 | 26 | 3 October 2025 | 2026 |

== Gallery ==
Shooting locations and sets

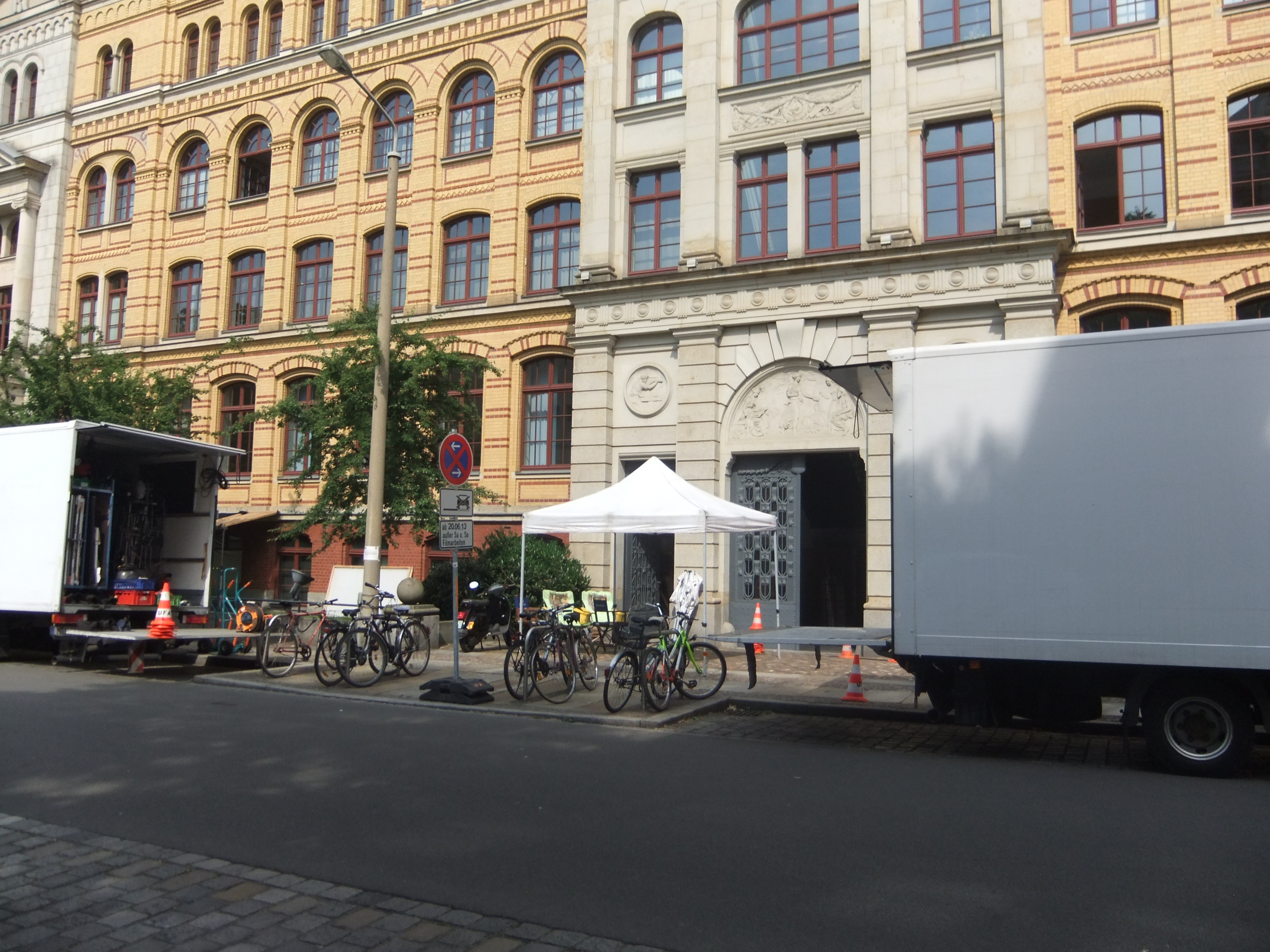

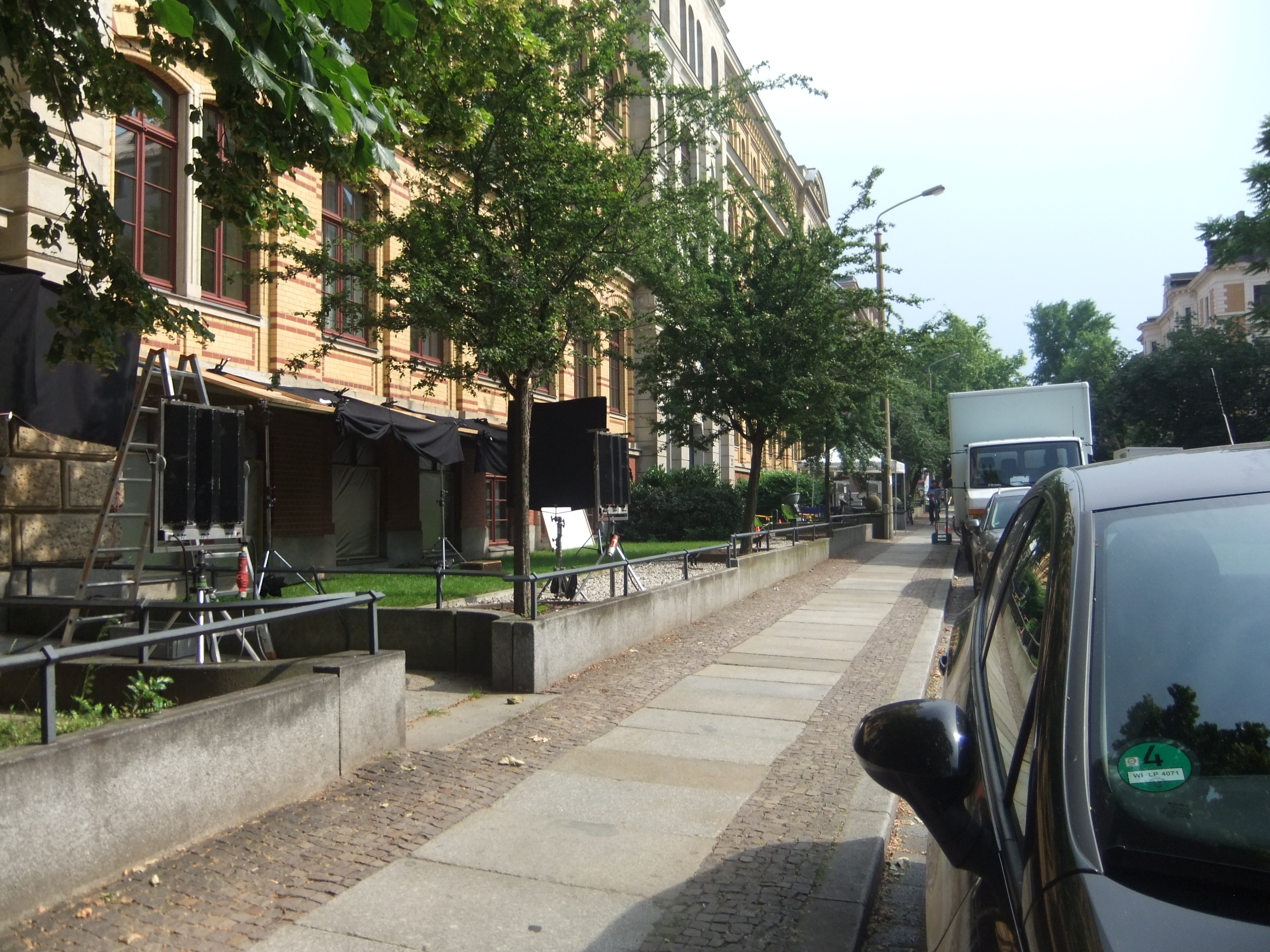

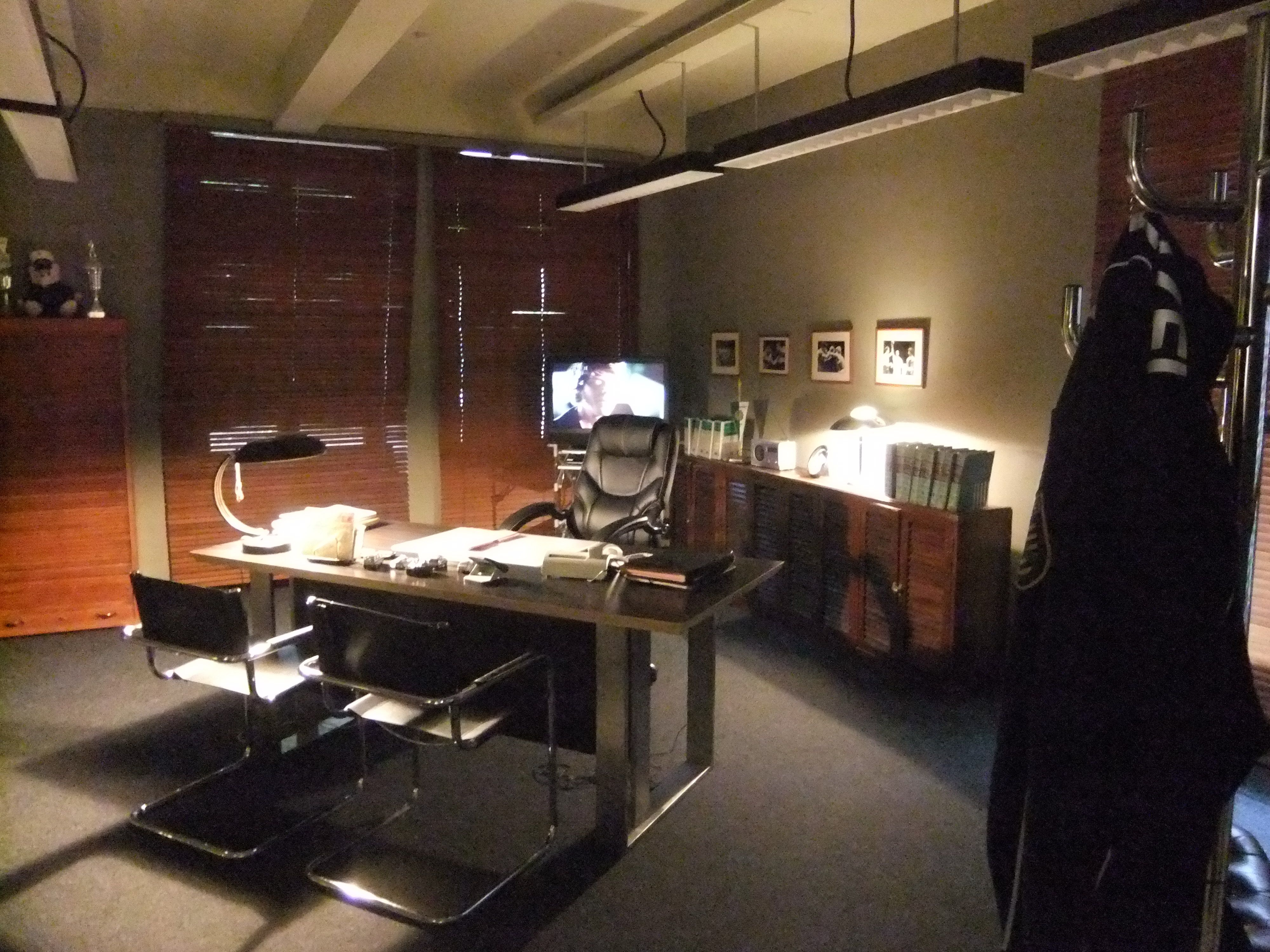

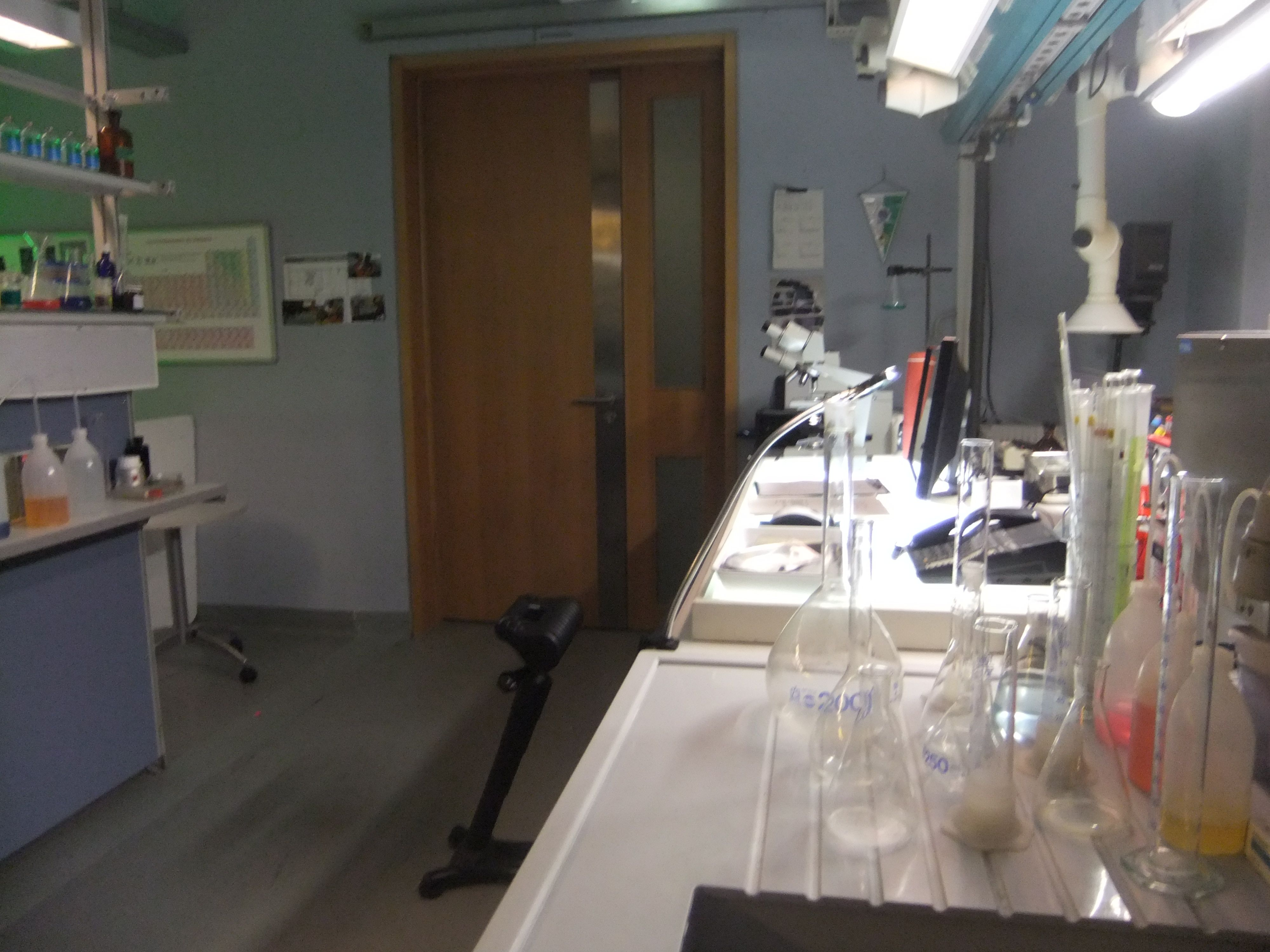

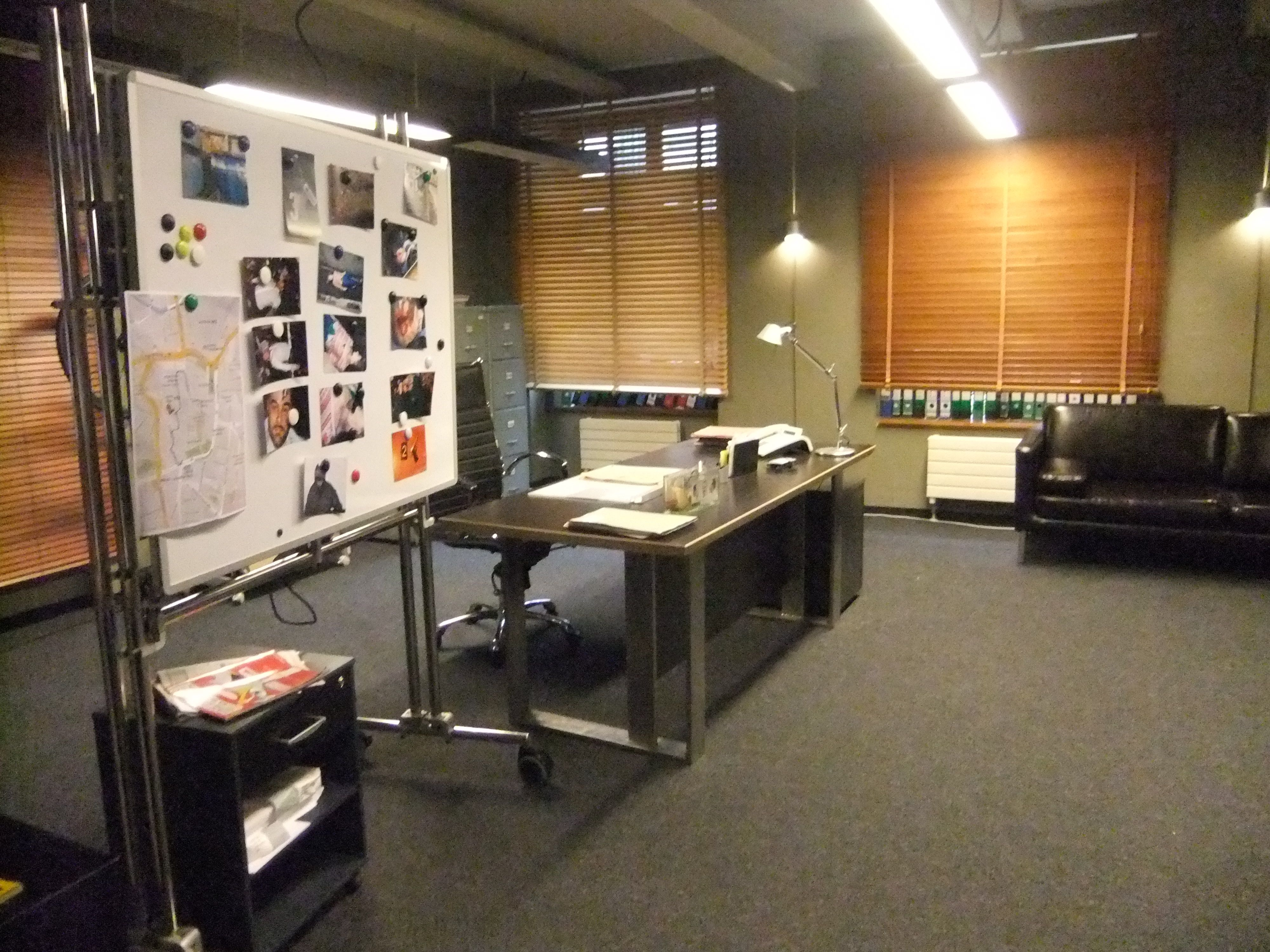

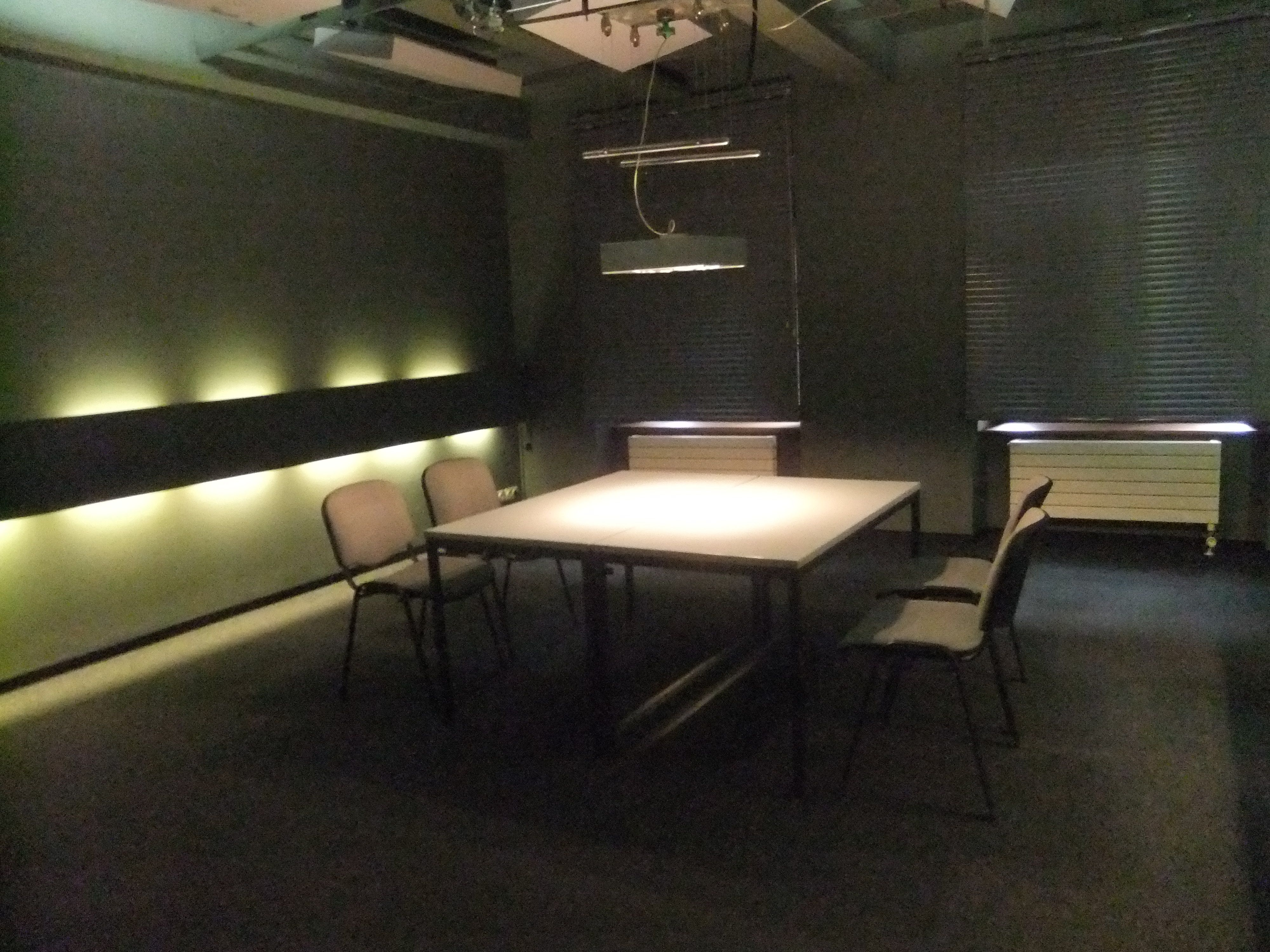

== Special ==
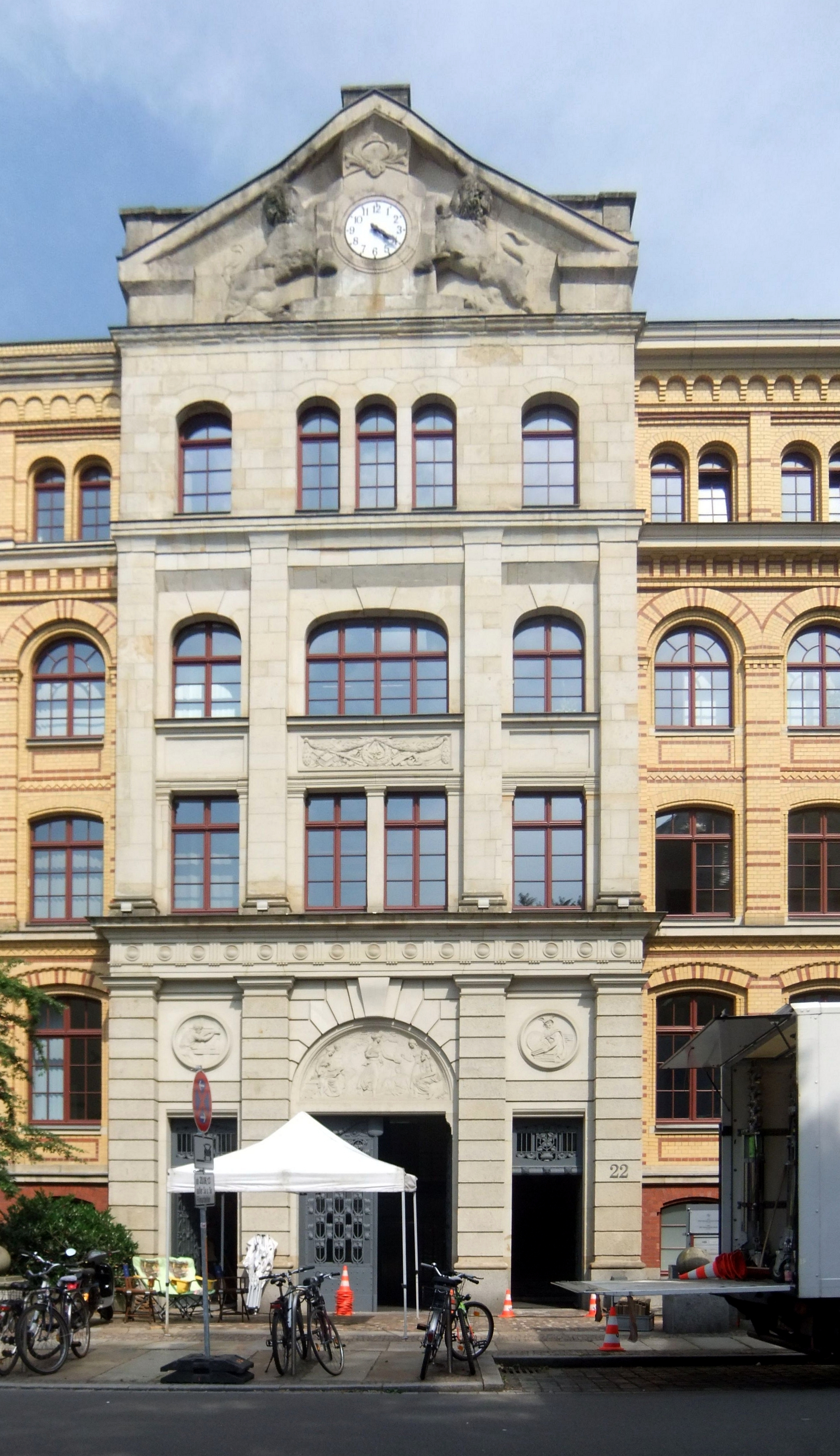
SOKO Leipzig headquarters

In April 2013, a five-part crossover between five ZDF SOKO series, titled SOKO – Der Prozess, began filming. The teams included in the show are 5113, Cologne, Leipzig, Stuttgart, and Wismar.

== See also ==
- List of German television series
