= SOKO München =

German crime drama television series

- Also known as: SOKO 5113
- Genre: Police procedural
- Created by: Dieter Schenk
- Written by: Conny Lens; Franz-Xaver Wendleder; Hubert Eckert; Jochen Wedegärtner; Renate Kampmann
- Directed by: Kai Borsche; Bodo Schwarz; Ulrich Stark; Zbynek Cerven
- Starring: Wilfried Klaus (1978–2009); Werner Kreindl (1978–1992); Bernd Herzsprung (1978–1992); Hartmut Schreier (1992–2010); Michel Guillaume (1993–2017); Christine Döring (2000–2008); Bianca Hein (2006–2020); Gerd Silberbauer (2008–2020); Joscha Kiefer (2010–2020)
- Theme music composer: Arpad Bondy
- Composers: Axel Kroell; Robert Fuhrmann; Robert Krolage
- Country of origin: West Germany (1978–1990); Germany (1990–2020)
- Original language: German
- No. of seasons: 46
- No. of episodes: 675

Production
- Executive producer: Eva Gerstenberg
- Producers: Daniel van den Berg; Joachim Kosack
- Production locations: Munich, Bavaria, Germany
- Cinematography: Oliver-Maximilian Kraus; Matthias Papenmeier; Stefan Motzek
- Editor: Axel Laustroer
- Running time: 43 minutes
- Production companies: Elan-Film Gierke & Company (1978–2020); UFA Fernsehproduktion (1978–2013); UFA Fiction (2014–2020)

Original release
- Network: ZDF
- Release: 2 January 1978 – 29 December 2020

Related
- SOKO – Der Prozess

SOKO München (until 2015: SOKO 5113) is a German police procedural television series that first aired on 2 January 1978 on ZDF. "SOKO" is an abbreviation of the German word Sonderkommission, which means "special investigative team". Production of the show ended in 2020, after forty-two years.

== Crossover ==
On 3 April 2013, five SOKO teams were brought together for a five-part special titled SOKO – Der Prozess. In it, the teams from Munich, Cologne, Leipzig, Stuttgart, and Wismar have to solve the murder of a police officer. The five episodes were shown across Germany from 30 September to 4 October 2013.

== Longest-serving cast ==
- Wilfried Klaus as Chief Inspector Horst Schickl (381 episodes, 1978–2008)
- Hartmut Schreier as Chief Inspector Manne Brand (278 episodes, 1992–2008)
- Michel Guillaume as Chief Inspector Theo Renner (261 episodes, 1993–2008)
- Werner Kreindl as Chief Inspector Karl Göttmann (126 episodes, 1978–1992)
- Christine Döring as Chief Inspector Susanne von Hagenberg (118 episodes, 2000–2008)
- Bernd Herzsprung as Chief Detective Fred Less (115 episodes, 1978–2008)

== Spin-offs ==
The first spin-off of SOKO München was a twelve-part series named Solo für Sudmann, launched in 1997. This was followed by various SOKO series based in different cities in Germany and Austria:

- Leipzig Homicide (SOKO Leipzig, since 2001)
- SOKO Kitzbühel (2001–2021)
- SOKO Köln (since 2003)
- SOKO Wismar (since 2004)
- SOKO Donau (in Germany SOKO Wien; since 2005)
- SOKO Rhein-Main (2006–2007; initially titled Die Spezialisten: Kripo Rhein-Main)
- SOKO Stuttgart (since 2009)
- SOKO Hamburg (2018–2024)
- SOKO Potsdam (since 2018)
- SOKO Linz (since 2021)

== See also ==
- List of German television series
