= Susu Padotzke =

German actress

- Born: 30 May 1976 (age 49); Grünstadt, Rhineland-Palatinate, Germany
- Occupation: Actress
- Spouse: Sebastian Padotzke
- Children: 2

Susu Padotzke (born 30 May 1976) is a German actress.

== Career ==
As a child, Padotzke played the violin, viola and piano. After graduating from high school in 1996, she studied classical singing at the Hochschule für Musik Freiburg until 2001. She interpreted different musical styles such as jazz, funk, rock and soul.

After her acting training, which she graduated with a diploma in 2007, she was seen in 2010 in Forsthaus Falkenau and in 2011 in Der Doc und die Hexe. In addition, she repeatedly had episode roles in SOKO München and the Die Rosenheim-Cops. Since 2017, Padotzke has played the main role of the pathologist Caroline Fuchs in the ARD early evening series Hubert ohne Staller.

== Personal life ==
Padotzke currently lives in Munich. In addition to her native German, she also speaks English and French. She is married to musician Sebastian Padotzke with whom she has two daughters, Laila and Lola Padotzke.

== Filmography ==
- 2001: Redefind (Short film)
- 2005: Wünsch dir was (Short film)
- 2006: THX 1139 (Short film)
- 2007: Falling (Short film)
- 2007: Stadtrand (Short film)
- 2008: Verbotene Liebe (TV series, 2 episodes)
- 2009, 2015, 2019: SOKO München (TV series, different roles, 3 episodes)
- 2010: Forsthaus Falkenau (TV series, 4 episodes)
- 2011–2012: Der Doc und die Hexe (TV series, 4 episodes)
- 2011: Schmidt & Schmitt – Wir ermitteln in jedem Fall (TV series, 10 episodes)
- 2012, 2016, 2017, 2019: Die Rosenheim-Cops (TV series, different roles, 3 episodes)
- 2014: Die Garmisch-Cops (TV series, episode Gesund sterben)
- 2014: Weißblaue Geschichten (TV series)
- 2015: Sturm der Liebe (ARD Telenovela, 9 Episodes)
- 2015: Inga Lindström – Liebe deinen Nächsten (TV series)
- 2015: Um Himmels Willen
- 2017: München Mord – Auf der Straße, nachts, allein
- 2017: Heldt (TV series, episode Unter die Haut)
- since 2017: Hubert ohne Staller (TV series; 2011–2018: Hubert und Staller)
- 2018: Unzertrennlich nach Verona
- 2018: Rote Rosen (Telenovela, season 15)
- 2018: Hubert und Staller – Eine schöne Bescherung (TV film)
- 2019: Frühling – Das verlorene Mädchen (TV series)
- 2019–2020: Reiterhof Wildenstein (TV series, 4 episodes)
- 2021: Kanzlei Berger
