= Manou Lubowski =

German actor (born 1969)

- Born: 6 November 1969 (age 56); Munich, West Germany
- Occupation: Actor
- Years active: 1987–present
- Spouse: Naike Rivelli (m. 2002; div. 2008)

Manou Lubowski (German: [ˈmaːnuː luˈbɔfskiː], Polish: [luˈbɔ.fskʲi]; born 6 November 1969) is a film, television, voice, and radio actor.

== Career ==
As a child, Lubowski played in various German-language radio drama productions. He is well known for the role of Willi "Klößchen" Sauerlich in TKKG audio play, in which he has played since 1981. One of his first major roles was 1997 film Pták Ohnivák, where he played Prince Afron.

As an actor, he appeared in numerous German-language series such as Derrick (1993, 1996), Verbotene Liebe (1995), Tatort (2000), Coast Guard (2002, 2004–2016), The Country Doctor (2006–2009), Forsthaus Falkenau (2009–2013). He also appeared in the numerous German-language films, such as The Hunt for the Hidden Relic (2002), Guardians (2012), Meine allerschlimmste Freundin (2014), and Zum Glück zurück (2021). He is also a voice actor, appearing in numerous German-language dubbing film versions.

== Personal life ==
Manou Lubowski was born on 6 November 1969 in Munich, then part of West Germany. His older sister Scarlet Cavadenti is also an actress.

From 1997 to 2001, he was in a relationship with actress Tina Ruland. In 2002, he married Italian actress Naike Rivelli; the marriage lasted nine months, after which, they lived in separation until the divorce occurred in 2008. As of 2015, Lubowski is in a relationship with a film producer Lara von Stumberg.

== Filmography ==
=== Films ===
Year	Title	Role	Notes	Ref.
1987	Leere Welt	Tom Miller	Uncredited	
1992	Manöver		Short film	
1995	Over My Dead Body	White-collar worker		
1996	Die Traumnummer – Die Hotline zum Glück	Marc		
1996	Nadine, nackt im Bistro	Jean-Claude		
1997	Pták Ohnivák	Prince Afron		
1997	Herz über Kopf	Jakob		
1998	Stürmischer Sommer	Max		
1999	Rivalinnen der Liebe	Dexter		
2000	Dir zu Liebe	Jochen Keile		
2000	Dracula 2000			
2001	Venus and Mars	Andre		
2001	Eine Hochzeit und (k)ein Todesfall	Daniel		
2002	The Hunt for the Hidden Relic	Yehoshua		
2003	Espresso	Mario	Short film	
2005	Nicht ohne meinen Schwiegervater	Dr. Teubner		
2007	The Vexxer	Speaker in commercial no. 1		
2008	Jasper: Journey to the End of the World	Jaspers Vater	Voice	
2010	Jerry Cotton	Steve Dillaggio		
2010	We Are the Night	Restaurant guest		
2010	Der Psycho Pate	Michael		
2011	The Time of Silence	Journalist from Germany		
2012	Guardians	Police officer #2		
2012	Hansi und Hubsi	Marco Klein		
2013	Buddy	Action Leader		
2015	My Worst Best Friend	Police officer		
2018	Hot Dog	Peter		
2021	Zum Glück zurück	Matthias Genter		
2021	Die Rettung der uns bekannten Welt			
2022	Hui Buh und das Hexenschloss	Necronomicon		
2022	Lieber Kurt			

=== Television series ===
Year	Title	Role	Notes	Ref.
1993, 1996	Derrick	Anton Robel	2 episodes	
1995	Verbotene Liebe	Gero von Sterneck	86 episodes	
1995	Schwarz greift ein	Robert	Episode: "Bis der Tod euch scheidet" (no. 21)	
1995	Weißblaue Wintergeschichten		Episode: "Ein bißchen Hoffnung/Spuren im Schnee" (no. 5)	
1995	Rosamunde Pilcher	Ivan	Episode: "Wolken am Horizont" (no. 8)	
1998	Rosamunde Pilcher	Tom Barns	Episode: "Rückkehr ins Paradies" (no. 23)	
1998	First Love – Die große Liebe	Jörg		
1998	SOKO München	Bene Tinker	Episode: "Eine Frage der Logik" (no. 181)	
2007	SOKO München	Christoph Jung	Episode: "Verhängnis" (no. 364)	
2009	SOKO München	Klaus Hartmann	Episode: "Brisante Dateien" (no. 400)	
2010	SOKO München	Joschi Manzinger	Episode: "Tod eines Hochzeitsplaners" (no. 433)	
2013	SOKO München	Norbert Geiss	Episode: "Für meine Tochter" (no. 493)	
2015	SOKO München	Eckhard Fuchs	Episode: "Auf Abwegen" (no. 545)	
2000	Samt und Seide		9 episodes	
2000	Max & Lisa	Bodo	Episode: "Die Party" (no. 3)	
2000	Tatort	Peter Burkhardt	Episode: "Einmal täglich" (no. 457)	
2001	Leipzig Homicide	Thorsten Krämer	Episode: "Abschied für immer" (no. 7)	
2001	Sommer und Bolten: Gute Ärzte, keine Engel	Jan Ponka	Episode: "Bis dass der Tod euch scheidet" (no. 2)	
2001	All My Daughters	Thommi	3 episodes	
2002	A Case for Two	Gert Schrewe	Episode: "Ein schändlicher Plan" (no. 194)	
2002	Highspeed – Die Ledercops	Lorenz Brandner	Episode: "Unter Haien" (no. 2)	
2002	Coast Guard	Lars Wandrey	Episode: "Absturz in den Tod" (no. 53)	
2004–2016	Coast Guard	Thure Sander	Reculing role; 45 episodes	
2003	Alphateam – Die Lebensretter im OP	Tim Weber	Episode: "Alte Geschichten" (no. 189)	
2003	Der Pfundskerl	Manolo	Episode: "Mord im Zoo" (no. 8)	
2004	Frech wie Janine	Volker	Episode: "Janine wird klug" (no. 2)	
2006	Die ProSieben Märchenstunde	Jakob	Episode: "Zwerg Nase – 4 Fäuste für ein Zauberkraut" (no. 3)	
2006–2009	The Country Doctor	Nicolas Brenner	29 episodes	
2007	Agathe kann's nicht lassen	Luca Tomasi	Episode: "Das Mörderspiel" (no. 5)	
2008	SOKO Kitzbühel	Markus Etz	Episode: "Todbringendes Erbe" (no. 78)	
2008	Die Rosenheim-Cops	Janosch Landler	Episode: "Jung, schön, fit und tot" (no. 136)	
2014	Die Rosenheim-Cops	Ulrich Reiter	Episode: "Rosenheimer Geheimnisse" (no. 292)	
2017	Die Rosenheim-Cops	Gerald Trettinger	Episode: "Nur Hansen war Zeuge" (no. 371)	
2020	Die Rosenheim-Cops	Maximilian Schober	Episode: "Zwei Fälle für Stadler" (no. 457)	
2009	The Fifth Commandment	Anton Lubinski	Episode: "Auf dem Jakobsweg" (no. 7)	
2009–2013	Forsthaus Falkenau	Peter Kögl	38 episodes	
2011	Hubert ohne Staller	Marcel Mühlbauer	Episode: "Requiem für Miss Oberbayern" (no. 4)	
2017	Hubert ohne Staller	Max Weynfels	Episode: "Hoch versichert, tief gefallen" (no. 88)	
2012	The Last Cop	Holger Hackermann	Episode: "Das Killer-Alphabet" (no. 34)	
2012	Add a Friend	Peter Danner	Episode: "Vollidiot schreibt man mit zwei l" (no. 9)	
2012	Der Bergdoktor – Virus	Thomas Schira		
2015	Bettys Diagnose	Thomas Wäller	Episodes: "Vergeben und vergessen" (no. 7)	
2015	Hammer & Sichl	Boxtrainer Jannis	2 episodes	
2015	Kreuzfahrt ins Glück	Magnus Wohlers	Episode: "Hochzeitsreise nach Montenegro" (no. 22)	
2019	Kreuzfahrt ins Glück	Alexandre Wenger	Episode: "Hochzeitsreise in die Normandie" (no. 30)	
2017–2019	Dr. Klein	Volker Beier	25 episodes	
2018	In aller Freundschaft	Franz Heikle	Episode: "Herzversagen" (no. 825)	
2018	Die Bergretter	Georg Scharnitz	Episode: "Letzte Hoffnung" (no. 61)	
2018	SOKO Stuttgart	Roland Rust	Episode: "Fremde Stimmen" (no. 218)	
2020	SOKO Stuttgart	Maurice Grange	Episode: "Schön bis in den Tod" (no. 273)	
2019	Pastewka	Dr. Simon Schätzlein	9 episodes	
2019	Circle of Life	Gero Jäger	Episode: "Hart am Limit" (no. 126)	
2020	WaPo Bodensee	Harter Stoff		
2021	Kanzlei Berger	Waldo Hartmann	Episode: "Der Kollaps" (no. 1)	
