= Anne Werner =

German actress (born 1979)

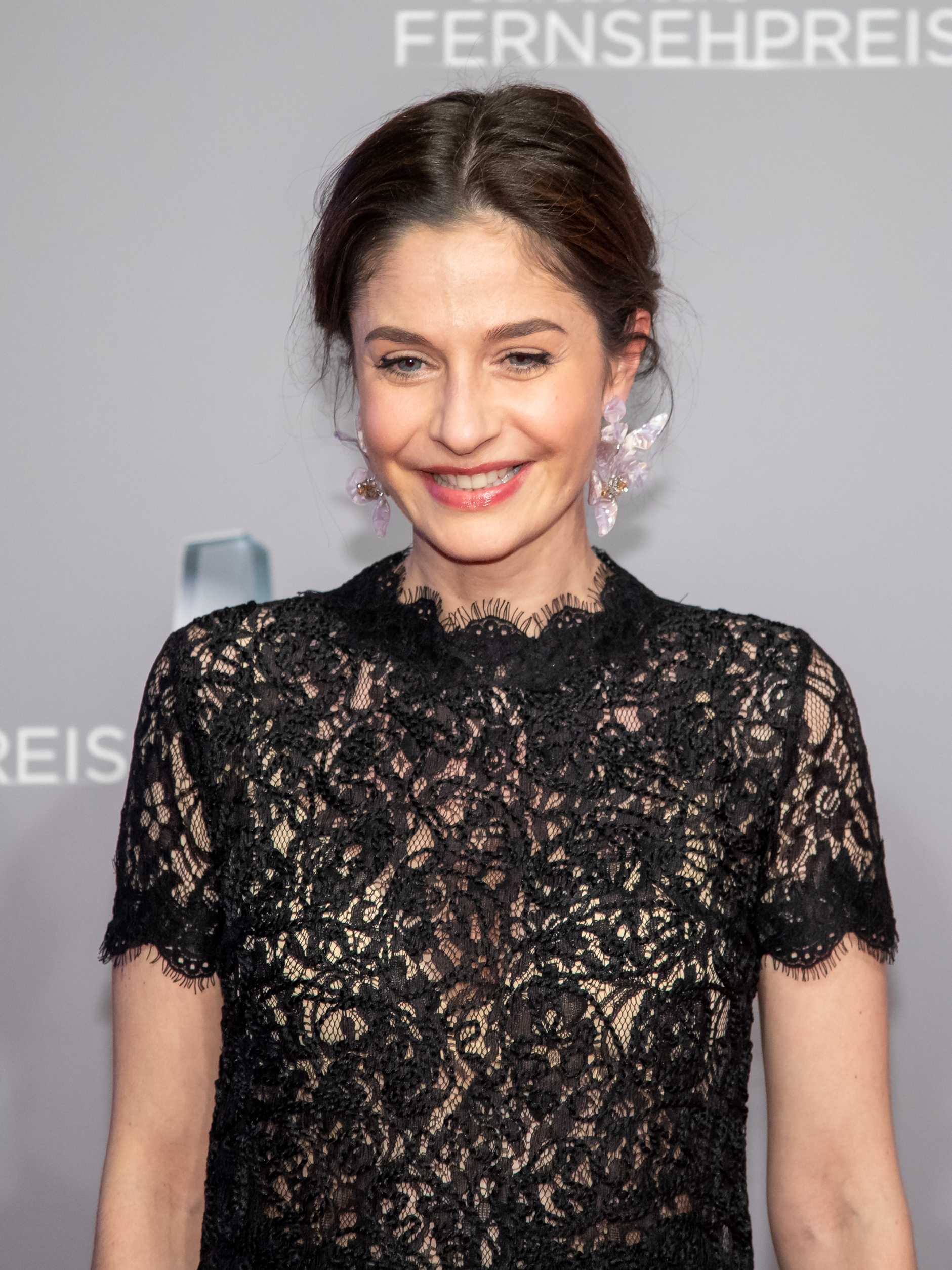
- Anne Werner in 2019
- Born: 1979 (age 46–47); Mainz, Germany
- Occupation: Actress

Anne Werner (born 1979 in Mainz) is a German television and theater actress. Her most popular role was in the 2017 ARD television series Praxis mit Meerblick as Dr. Maja Pirsich.

== Life ==
Anne Werner was born in Mainz in 1979. She completed her acting training at Ball State University in Muncie, Indiana in the United States from 2003 to 2004. After her training she went back to Germany. She started acting in both her native Germany and abroad. In Germany she was seen in television series such as Tatort, SOKO Stuttgart, Die Rosenheim-Cops and Schloss Einstein. Since 2017, Werner has acting in the ARD television series Praxis mit Meerblick alongside Tanja Wedhorn. She appears as Dr. Maja Pirsich in a continuous series role. She also appeared in several commercials. Anne Werner lives in Berlin.

== Filmography ==
Sources:

- 1999: Boy needs Girl (Theater)
- 1999: Spiel mit dem Feuer
- 2001: Durch dick und Dünn
- 2003: Taschenliebe (Theater)
- 2006: Left and Leaving (Theater)
- 2007: No se Vaya (Short film)
- 2009: Bobby spielt das Leben (Theater)
- 2009: Freiheit um jeden Preis
- 2009: Tatort – Heimwärts (TV series)
- 2010: Schloss Einstein (TV series, 4 episodes)
- 2010: Rumpe & Tuli (Theater)
- 2010: SOKO Leipzig (TV series, Episode High Noon)
- 2011: Küstenwache (TV series, Episode Auf der Kippe)
- 2012: SOKO München (TV series, Episode Das letzte Solo)
- 2012: Inga Lindström – Ein Lied für Solveig (TV series)
- 2013: In aller Freundschaft (TV series, Episode Offene Wunden)
- 2014: 16 über Nacht!
- 2016: Der Bergdoktor (TV series, Episode Erzwungene Liebe)
- 2016–2017: SOKO Stuttgart (TV series, 7 episodes)
- 2016: Ku’damm 56 (Fernsehdreiteiler, 3 episodes)
- 2016: Alarm für Cobra 11 – Die Autobahnpolizei (TV series, Episode Risiko)
- 2017: Die Rosenheim-Cops (TV series, Episode Ein Karton kommt selten allein)
- 2017: Neben der Spur – Dein Wille geschehe (TV series)
- 2017: Praxis mit Meerblick (TV series)
- 2017–2019: Ostfrieslandkrimis (TV series)
  - 2017: Ostfriesenkiller
  - 2018: Ostfriesenblut
  - 2019: Ostfriesensünde
- 2018: Familie Dr. Kleist (TV series, Episode Das große Zittern)
- 2018: Inga Lindström – Das Geheimnis der Nordquists (TV series)
- 2018: Tatort: Wir kriegen euch alle (TV series)
- 2020: Morden im Norden: Bilder des Todes
- 2020: Das Geheimnis des Totenwaldes (TV film)
- 2023: Doktor Ballouz (TV series, Episode Scherbenhaufen)
