= Prestatyn Castle =

Castle in Denbighshire, Wales

Coordinates: 53°20′19″N 3°23′41″W

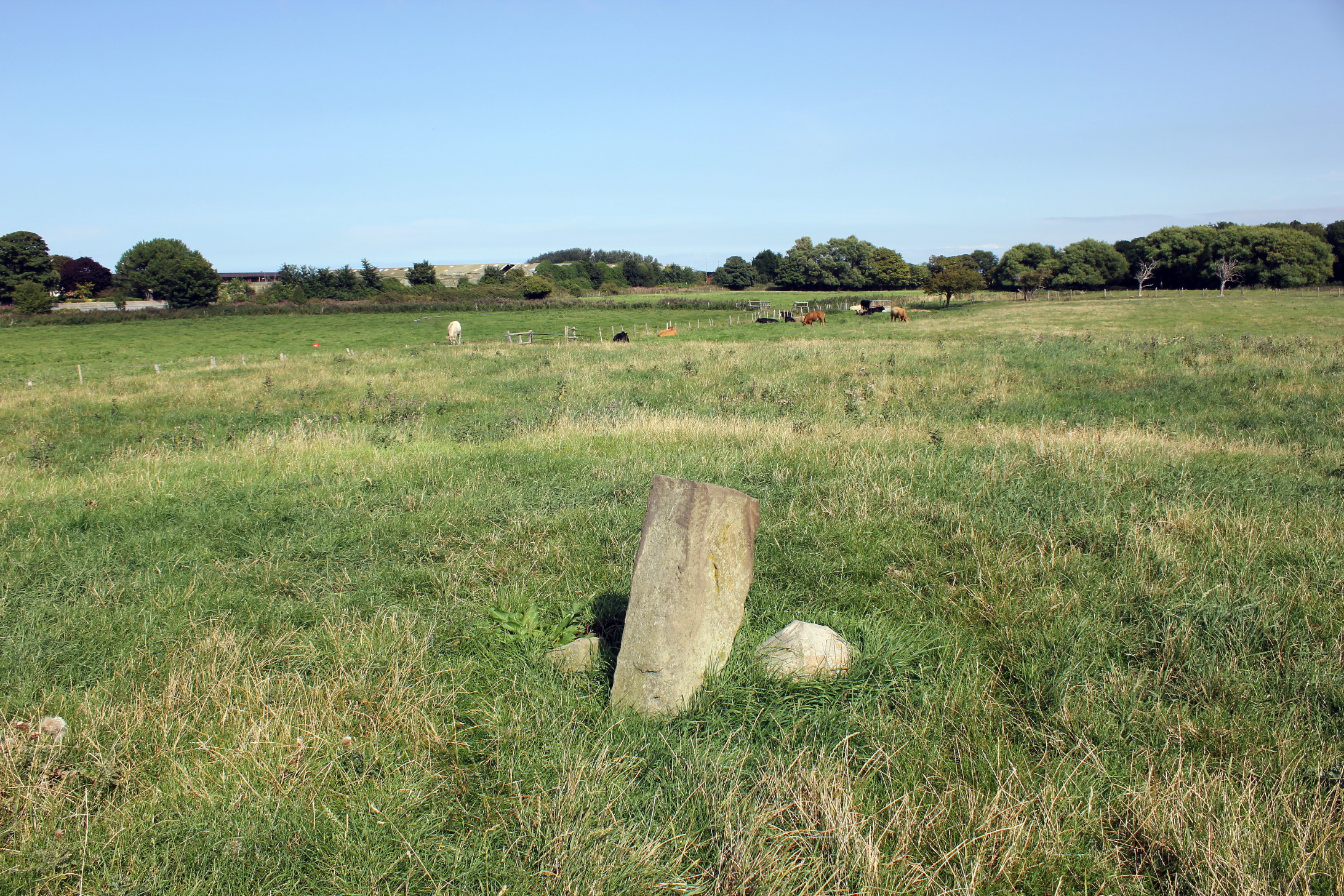
A rubbing stone on Prestatyn Castle motte

Prestatyn Castle is a motte and bailey castle in Prestatyn, Wales, built in 1157 on land granted to the Norman lord Robert Banastre by King Henry II of England. It was built on level ground on the coastal plain and commanded an extensive view. Nowadays the mound and slight remnants of a causeway are all that is visible.

== History ==
King Henry II of England granted Prestatyn to Robert Banastre (or Robert de Banastre) in 1165. The castle was destroyed by the Welsh led by Owain Gwynedd in 1167. It does not appear to have been rebuilt, and the Banastre family fled to Lancashire where Robert constructed a house on the site currently occupied by Bank Hall on land that was granted to him by Henry de Lacy. By 1279, this region was again under control of the English but historical records only refer to the manor house and not the fort.

== The site ==
An earth mound, visible in fields to the south of the Prestatyn railway station, near Nant Hall, marks the site of an early wooden motte and bailey castle. Prestatyn Castle occupies a low-lying position, but still commands a view across much of the flat coastal plain and guarded the coast road between Rhuddlan and Chester. The only remains of the castle are a raised mound about 20 m (66 ft) in diameter surrounded by a ditch. The bailey enclosed the whole of the motte, an unusual arrangement. A slightly raised causeway extends to the south but there is no sign of what entrance arrangements were present, nor of what structure originally topped the mound. Excavations that took place around 1913 revealed that the bailey was surrounded by a substantial stone wall about 1.2 m (4 ft) thick.
