= Karin Thaler =

German actress (born 1965)

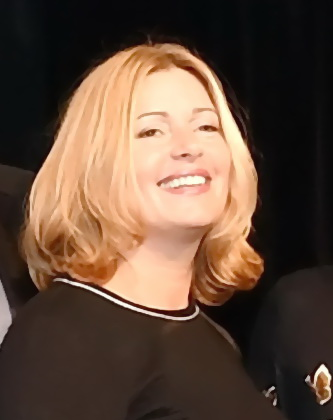
- Karin Thaler in 2017
- Born: June 12, 1965 (age 60); Deggendorf, Germany
- Years active: since 1986
- Known for: Die Rosenheim-Cops, Hubert und Staller

Karin Thaler (born June 12, 1965) is a German actress who has played in numerous German television films and series.

== Life ==
Thaler was born on 12 June 1965 in Germany.

In 1986 she had her television debut with Gunda's Father. Since 1987, Thaler has also been seen in various roles at various theatres. Her first feature film, The Nasty Girl, received an Oscar nomination in 1991.

Thaler has been part of the regular cast of the ZDF series Die Rosenheim-Cops since the beginning of the first season. Also from the beginning of the series in 2011 until her exit in 2017, she was the leading actress in the series Hubert ohne Staller in Das Erste. For ZDF, she was also seen in several seasons of the family series Unser Charly as Inka Lenz, wife of Achim Lenz, played by Frank Behnke.

Thaler has been married to musician Milos Malesevic since 1997. The couple lives in Unterföhring near Munich. She has two sons from a previous relationship born 1984 and 1987.

== Filmography ==
Thaler has played in many films.

Filmography
Year	Name	Episode
1986	Gunda's Father	–
1987	Es geigt sich was	–
1987	Michas Flucht	–
1987	Derrick	Nachtstreife
1988	Praxis Bülowbogen	Schwarze Nelke
1988 to 1989	Büro, Büro	Many Episodes
1989	Die Schwarzwaldklinik	2 episodes
1990	Das schreckliche Mädchen	–
1990 to 2008	Der Landarzt	27 episodes
1992	Im Schatten der Gipfel	–
1992	Ein Engel für Felix	–
1993 to 1996	Ein Bayer auf Rügen	26 episodes
1993	Der Komödienstadel	Die Kartenlegerin
1993	Hochwürden erbt das Paradies	–
1994–1995	Lutz & Hardy	17 episodes
1994	Intimfeinde	Auch Erben will gelernt sein
1994	Das Traumschiff	Dubai
1995 to 1997	Der Bergdoktor	3 episodes
1995	Weißblaue Geschichten	Der letzte Wille
1996	Klinik unter Palmen	3 episodes
1996 to 2000	St. Angela	unknown
1997	Unser kleiner Engel	–
1997	Dr. Stefan Frank – Der Arzt, dem die Frauen vertrauen	–
1998	Der Bulle von Tölz	Der Mistgabelmord
1999 to 2008	Unser Charly	44 episodes
1999 to 2002	Wilder Kaiser	unknown
2002	Ein Hund für alle Fälle	–
since 2002	Die Rosenheim-Cops	Many Episodes
2003	Das Traumschiff	Südsee
2005	Rosamunde Pilcher	Vermächtnis der Liebe
2006	Um Himmels Willen	Unknown
2006	Die Landärztin	Diagnose Tollwut
2008	Der Bulle von Tölz	Das Ende aller Sitten
2008	Tischlein deck dich	Sechs auf einen Streich
2008	Utta Danella	Wenn Träume fliegen
2008	Der Bergdoktor	–
2009	Mein Nachbar, sein Dackel & ich	–
2009	Baby frei Haus	–
2010	Vincent Wants to Sea	–
2010	Gräfliches Roulette	–
2011	Stankowskis Millionen	–
2011 to 2017	Hubert und Staller	Many Episodes
2012	Heimkehr mit Hindernissen	–
2016	Unter Wölfen	–
2016	Die Chefin	Ein ehrenwertes Haus
2017	SOKO Donau	Die Entscheidung
2017	Dieses bescheuerte Herz	–
2018	Venus im vierten Haus	–
2018	SOKO München	So wie du bist
2019	Rosamunde Pilcher	Die Braut meines Bruders

== Awards ==
Awards
Year	Award	for
1987	Goldener Gong	Gundas Vater
