= List of listed buildings in Darvel, East Ayrshire =

This is a list of listed buildings in the parish of Darvel, East Ayrshire, Scotland.

== List ==
Name	Location	Date Listed	Grid Ref. (Note: Sometimes known as OSGB36, the grid reference (where provided) is based on the British national grid reference system used by the Ordnance Survey. • "Guide to National Grid". Ordnance Survey. • "Get-a-map". Ordnance Survey.)	Geo-coordinates	Notes	LB Number (Note: Historic Environment Scotland assign a unique alphanumeric identifier to each designated site in Scotland, for listed buildings this always begins with "LB", for example "LB12345".)	Image
Ranoldcoup Bridge				55°36′22″N 4°16′55″W	Category B	24485	Upload Photo
1-5 (Inclusive Nos) Hastings Square				55°36′34″N 4°16′55″W	Category B	24480	Upload Photo
Dalquharn				55°36′24″N 4°17′22″W	Category C(S)	24486	Upload Photo
1 Mair's Road Former Fish Farm				55°36′27″N 4°16′55″W	Category B	24489	Upload Photo
Mair's Free School, Front Boundary Walls, Gatepiers And Gates Ranoldcoup Road				55°36′29″N 4°16′57″W	Category B	24495	Upload Photo
Nos. 6, 7, 8 And 9 Hastings Square				55°36′34″N 4°17′00″W	Category B	24481	Upload another image
No. 106 East Main Street				55°36′38″N 4°16′30″W	Category B	24484	Upload Photo
The Black Bull Hotel, Hastings				55°36′35″N 4°16′59″W	Category B	24482	Upload another image
Darvel Church				55°36′33″N 4°16′57″W	Category B	24479	Upload another image
Railway Viaduct Over Glen Water				55°36′48″N 4°16′24″W	Category B	24487	Upload Photo
1, 3 Ranaldcoup Road Former Co-Op Building				55°36′34″N 4°16′54″W	Category B	24494	Upload Photo
Turf Hotel, Main Street				55°36′35″N 4°17′07″W	Category B	24483	Upload Photo
Greenbank				55°36′28″N 4°15′59″W	Category B	24488	Upload Photo
4 Mair's Road				55°36′28″N 4°17′01″W	Category B	24490	Upload Photo
2, 4, 6 East Main Street And Ranaldcoup Road Co-Op Building				55°36′34″N 4°16′54″W	Category C(S)	24491	Upload Photo
East Main Street And Kirkland Road Kirkland Park				55°36′44″N 4°16′29″W	Category B	24492	Upload Photo
10 12 West Main Street Darvel Town Hall And Library				55°36′36″N 4°16′56″W	Category B	24493	Upload another image

== Key ==
The scheme for classifying buildings in Scotland is:

- Category A: "buildings of national or international importance, either architectural or historic; or fine, little-altered examples of some particular period, style or building type."
- Category B: "buildings of regional or more than local importance; or major examples of some particular period, style or building type, which may have been altered."
- Category C: "buildings of local importance; lesser examples of any period, style, or building type, as originally constructed or moderately altered; and simple traditional buildings which group well with other listed buildings."

In March 2016 there were 47,288 listed buildings in Scotland. Of these, 8% were Category A, and 50% were Category B, with the remaining 42% being Category C.

== See also ==
- List of listed buildings in East Ayrshire
