= Darvel Music Festival =

Coordinates: 55°36′36″N 4°16′56.5″W

Darvel Music Festival is a music festival that has been held in the town of Darvel, East Ayrshire, Ayrshire, Scotland, since 2002.

The Darvel Music Festival is a community-led initiative, managed and supported by the Darvel Music Company. It features ten days of music with seven concerts and twenty five international and national performers at Darvel Town Hall. The festival, which occurs during the month of May, began to run bi-annually in 2009. People from not only the Irvine Valley near Darvel, Scotland, but elsewhere in the United Kingdom and the world attend the festival—increasing tourism and benefitting the economy in the area.

== History ==
The Festival is largely the result of the work of Neil McKenna and his wife Shelia, the director of the festival. When describing his reasons for wanting a music festival in Darvel, Neil McKenna said, "We moved to Darvel 13 years ago. In 2002 it was Darvel's 250th anniversary, and I managed a series of events. After getting involved in the community stuff, I wanted to focus on a central theme, which was essentially making Darvel a music town. It's already known for its lace and weaving, and Alexander Fleming, but we would love to make it the first-ever music town in Scotland." While they didn’t actually launch the festival, the McKennas have been very involved in the process, and are known to personally pick up artists from the airport, cook for them, and to let bands stay overnight in their home. Since its formation seven years ago, the festival has managed to get well-known bands to play, and attracts people from all over the world. To attract attendees, the organizers ask bands not to play in Glasgow or anywhere else in the west of Scotland around the time of the festival. Over the past few years people from such locations as Japan, Canada, Italy, Spain, Ireland, France, and Germany have come to the festival as it has gained notoriety. The local economy of Darvel has prospered because of this increase in visitors to the area.

== Darvel 'Homecoming' Music Festival 2009 ==
The Darvel ‘Homecoming’ Music Festival is held in Darvel Town Hall, which can hold approximately 360 people, on West Main Street in Darvel. The festival occurs from May 1 to May 10, and featured seven concerts and twenty five international and national performers. New acts are featured every day for £15 to £20 per ticket per day. The 2009 line-up includes Adriana, Attic Lights, Blues n' Trouble, Boo Hewerdine, Dropkick, Eddi Reader, Eileen Rose and the Holy Wreck, Esther O'Connor, Four Good Men (with Owen Paul), Gary Louris, and Mark Olson (of the Jayhawks), Hamilton Loomis Band, Hamish Stuart Band with special guest Jim Mullen, Hey Negrita, JJ Gilmour, Joni Keen and the Euan Stevenson Trio, Maggie Bell and Dave Kelly, Martin Taylor's Freternity featuring Alison Burns, Rainy and the Dust, Roddy Hart, Ruby Turner, The Endrick Brothers, The Garrett Wall Band, The Parish Music Box, The Primary 5, and the Seventh Sons. This year's line-up was arranged by festival producer Neil McKenna. The festival has gained a reputation for attracting some of the best international and national acts. Known for its friendly ambience and eclectic artists, the festival presents a wide range of musical styles including soul, Latin, funk, country, indie-pop, rock, and blues.

== 'Fringe' event 2009 ==
The main ‘Homecoming Festival’ is preceded by a ‘fringe event’ which showcases up and coming regional bands. This event is the start of the ‘homecoming’ celebration, and occurs before the main festival, which lasts from May first to May tenth. The event intends to support emerging talent and gives these acts the opportunity to perform with the same professional sound and lighting as the main acts at the ‘Homecoming’ event. Many bands and solo artists request to perform, and the festival committee decides who is offered a slot. This year, unsigned bands from West Scotland appeared at the ‘fringe’ event on the seventeenth and eighteenth of April. Five acts perform each night. All profits attained from selling tickets and merchandise are donated to the live music and youth development fund. The 2009 ‘fringe’ line-up for day one includes performances by What The Heroes Say, The Ghosties, Streetlight Conspiracy, The LaFontaines, and The Longhorns. Day two of the festival ‘fringe’ features the Iain Morrison Band, Iain McKinnon, Man at the Window, TV21, and Laki Mera. The tickets for the ‘fringe’ event are less expensive than those for the ‘Homecoming’ festival, with ticket prices ranging from £5 to £7. The event, like the ‘Homecoming’ event, is held in the Darvel Town Hall.

== Darvel Music Company ==
The Darvel Music Company is a community organization established in April 2008 in Darvel to promote music, culture, and live musical performance within Darvel and other East Ayrshire communities. The Darvel Music Company recently took over the organization and running of the Darvel Music Festival, and also plans to stage smaller concerts in Darvel Town Hall and to plan a series of music ‘sessions’ at local pubs. The company is run by volunteers and operated on a non-profit basis. It relies on grants, sponsorship, and fundraising events to finance the programs. Shelia McKenna, who is also the director of the music festival, is the new chairperson of the company.

== Regional award and funding ==
The Darvel Music Festival has, for the second time, received Event Scotland funding from the Regional Awards Program to market the festival during the 2009 ‘Homecoming year.’ The £10,000 grant pays for design fees, festival banners throughout the town, and national media advertising. The Chief Operating Officer of Event Scotland, Paul Bush, supports the festival partially because it successfully attracts visitors to East Ayrshire. The Darvel Music Committee (the DMC) is also applying for funding from Awards for All and East Ayrshire Council. Funding is also provided by Scottish Power Renewables, Atrium Homes, Gibson Wright Engineering and Klin Homes.

== Festival production team ==
The Festival Production Team includes Shelia McKenna (director), Neil McKenna (producer), Hugh Morton (treasurer), Josh Clinton, Stephanie Grant, Lisa Cunningham, Lynne McCubbin, Alex McAllister, Mike Ritchie (marketing), Gary Beck, David Paterson, Anne Fonteyne, Martin Hay, Alison Calder, Jim Dunn, Sofie Aspeslagh, and Rachel Clinton.
