= Hamilton Loomis =

American songwriter

- Born: Hamilton Michael Loomis; November 1, 1975 (age 50); Galveston, Texas, United States
- Genres: Electric blues, blues rock, soul blues
- Occupations: Guitarist, singer, songwriter, record producer
- Instruments: Guitar, bass guitar, vocals, percussion, harmonica, piano, trombone
- Years active: 1990s–present
- Labels: Ham-Bone Records; Blind Pig Records
- Website: hamiltonloomis.com

Hamilton Michael Loomis (born November 1, 1975) is an American electric blues guitarist, singer, songwriter, and record producer. One of his eight albums released to date, Ain't Just Temporary, peaked at number 7 in the Billboard Top Blues Albums Chart in September 2007.

In describing Loomis' musical style, Guitar Player magazine once stated, "if blues, soul, and rock can be said to form a triangle, you’ll find Hamilton Loomis right in the centre of it".

== Life and career ==
Loomis was born in Galveston, Texas, United States, to musical parents and he learned to play the drums, piano, guitar and harmonica at an early age. In his teenage years, he was part of a doo-wop singing family group that performed at the Delta Blues Festival. Having broken away from this stricture, Loomis began playing solo and met a number of renowned blues musicians. Loomis later commented, "When I was coming up in the music scene, I was lucky to have musical mentors like Joe "Guitar" Hughes, Johnny Copeland, and of course, rock icon Bo Diddley." “These ‘veterans’ took the time to teach and give advice to us youngsters, as if ‘passing the torch.’" Loomis also got help and advice from others including Clarence "Gatemouth" Brown and Albert Collins. Diddley especially became a friend and mentor to Loomis, later making guest appearances on a couple of Loomis' albums (Hamilton and Ain't Just Temporary), and giving Loomis a red guitar that he still plays.

In 1994, Ham-Bone Records issued Loomis' debut album, Hamilton, which received a nomination for a Grammy Award for Best Contemporary Blues Album in 1995. In 1996, Just Gimme One Night was released. In 2000, Loomis released All Fired Up, and acted in the role of Trevor in the VH1 movie At Any Cost. Three years later, Loomis signed a recording contract with Blind Pig Records, who issued, Kickin' It. Ain't Just Temporary (2007), another Blind Pig release, peaked at number 7 in the Billboard Top Blues Albums Chart in September 2007. In 2006, Loomis appeared as a guest on Jimmy Needham's album, Speak, playing guitar, bass and harmonica.

He later returned to Ham-Bone Records as he felt that Blind Pig, as a blues only outlet, was restricting his output purely along those lines. Give It Back (2013) featured Victor Wooten (Béla Fleck and the Flecktones) on bass and vocals. In the liner notes to the album, Loomis commented that he was hoping to share his knowledge with younger musicians. The title track was a musical tribute to his own mentors, and Loomis stated, "Now that they have passed, it's my duty, not just an obligation, to do the same with this generation's young musicians. That's giving it back, handing it down, passing it on, like the song says."

In 2009, the Hamilton Loomis Band performed at the Darvel Music Festival.

The Hamilton Loomis Band played at the 100 Club in London in June 2015, at the conclusion of their UK tour. Loomis and his band had an extensive touring schedule in the United States throughout the first eight months of 2016. 2017 has an equally busy tour schedule with performances in a number of Texas and Midwest venues, along with performance dates in the UK throughout July and August.

== Family ==
Hamilton Loomis is married to Sabrina LaField and they have one son, named Bo, after Bo Diddley, one of Loomis' influences.

== Discography ==
=== Albums ===
Year	Title	Record label	Billboard Top Blues Albums Chart
1994	Hamilton	Ham-Bone Records	
1996	Just Gimme One Night	Ham-Bone Records	
2000	All Fired Up	Ham-Bone Records	
2002	Live: Highlights	Ham-Bone Records	
2003	Kickin' It	Blind Pig Records	
2007	Ain't Just Temporary	Blind Pig Records	No. 7
2009	Live in England	Ham-Bone Records	
2013	Give It Back	Ham-Bone Records	
2017	Basics	Ham-Bone Records	

== See also ==
- List of electric blues musicians
