= Naike Rivelli =

Italian actress and singer (born 1974)

- Born: 10 October 1974 (age 52); Munich, West Germany
- Occupations: Actress; singer
- Years active: 1983–present
- Spouse: Manou Lubowski (m. 2002; div. 2008)
- Children: 1
- Mother: Ornella Muti

Naike Rivelli (born 10 October 1974) is an Italian actress and singer.

== Biography ==
Rivelli is the eldest daughter of actress Ornella Muti, who gave birth to her at age 19. For many years, she believed Spanish film producer José Luis Bermúdez de Castro was her father; following a DNA test requested by him, the two found they were not related, and her mother later declared that she did not know the identity of Naike's father.

In 1996, Rivelli gave birth to her son, the result of a brief relationship. In 2002, she married German actor Manou Lubowski; the marriage lasted nine months and, after separating, they divorced in 2008. Regarding her sexual orientation, at the beginning of 2010 she revealed her bisexuality.

== Selected filmography ==
- The Count of Monte Cristo (1998, TV miniseries), as young Mercédès Igualada
- The Unscarred (2000), as young Rafaella
- South Kensington (2001), as Ilaria
- The Hunt for the Hidden Relic (2002, TV film), as Sharon
- Open Graves (2009), as Elena
