= Böse Mädchen =

German comedy TV series

Böse Mädchen (Bad Girls) is a German comedy show by Sony Pictures – and FernsehproduktionsGmbH in corporation with the Biller & Vass TV ProduktionGbR for RTL which was broadcast for the first time on 12 October 2007 on German television.

The context of the show is that unsuspecting and often male passers are put in comical situations by three female decoys: Annett Fleischer, Isabell Polak and Manuela Wisbeck. Female stereotypes and corresponding reactions by men are put in the foreground during the show. For example, a woman fills up her boyfriend's Cabrio after she asked another driver what the right sort of fuel was and then fills up the interior of the car and not the gas tank.

The producer and director is Tommy Wosch under his nickname Thomas Vass.

During the first broadcast the show reached a market share of 18,1% in the chosen target group, which refers to 2.36 million viewers into the total sum of public.

In 2008 "Böse Mädchen" was nominated for the "Rose d’Or". The second season, which contained nine episodes, was broadcast starting 28 February 2009.

The third season ran from 27 February until 17 April 2010 on RTL and it was composed of seven episodes.

Jana Kilka supported the bad girls in some scenes.

On 15 July three episodes from the fourth season were broadcast on RTL. As a supporting protagonist there was Alena Gerber. The season is continuing since 17 September 2011.

The first season will come out on DVD 30 September 2011 in distribution of the Film Universum GmbH with a 12 years rating.

== See also ==
- List of German television series
