= William Sheret =

Scottish showjumper (1928–2025)

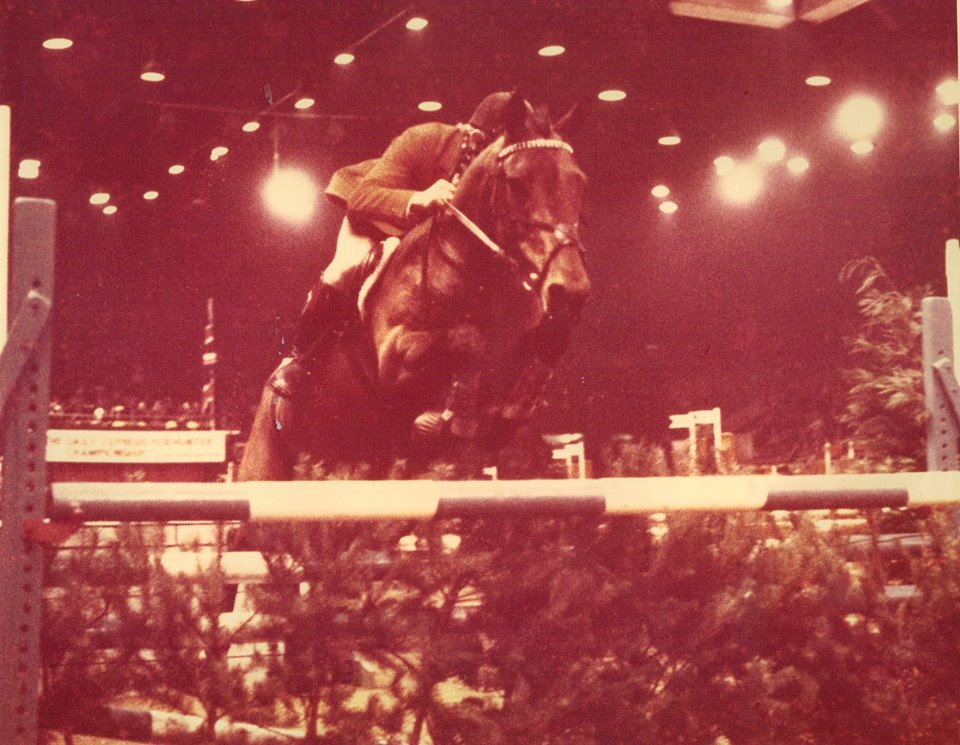
Sheret winning the 1975 Foxhunter Championship at the Horse of the Year Show

William Shaw Sheret, MBE (3 October 1928 – 18 April 2025) was a Scottish showjumper and trainer.

Sheret grew up in an area called Partick in Glasgow. He started riding horses at the age of 5 and started competing at the age of 13. He joined the British Army in 1947 and was stationed in Berlin, Germany. There he was asked to look after the stables near the Berlin Olympic Stadium and studied under the German show jumper Otto Klitzki. He went on to compete for the British Army at showjumping and returned home to the UK in 1949 and became a professional horseman, teaching, providing livery and competing.

His most notable success was winning the Daily Express Foxhunter Championship at the Horse of the Year Show at Wembley Arena, London on 7 October 1975 on St Corry.

He was honoured by Queen Elizabeth II at Buckingham Palace in 2005 for Services to Showjumping in Scotland, becoming a Most Excellent Order of the British Empire; an honour given by Her Majesty to people for special achievement. He was also the Honorary Vice President of British Showjumping's Scottish branch.

In October 2015, forty years since winning the class, Sheret was invited by the Horse and Hound Magazine and Grandstand Media to be part of the presentation party that presented the 2015 Foxhunter Champion, Robert McGuire on Anastasia van de Helle, with their trophy.

In September 2016 he launched his showjumping teaching philosophy book Keep Going Clear: A Guide to Better Showjumping on Amazon.

He was widowed when his wife Marjory Ingram Sheret died on 10 November 2009, and he later lived near Kintore, Aberdeenshire although he spent most of career living near Loudoun Hill, Darvel, Ayrshire. He had three children, six grandchildren and one great-grandchild.

Sheret died on 18 April 2025, at the age of 96.
