= Darvel Town Hall =

Municipal building in Darvel, Scotland

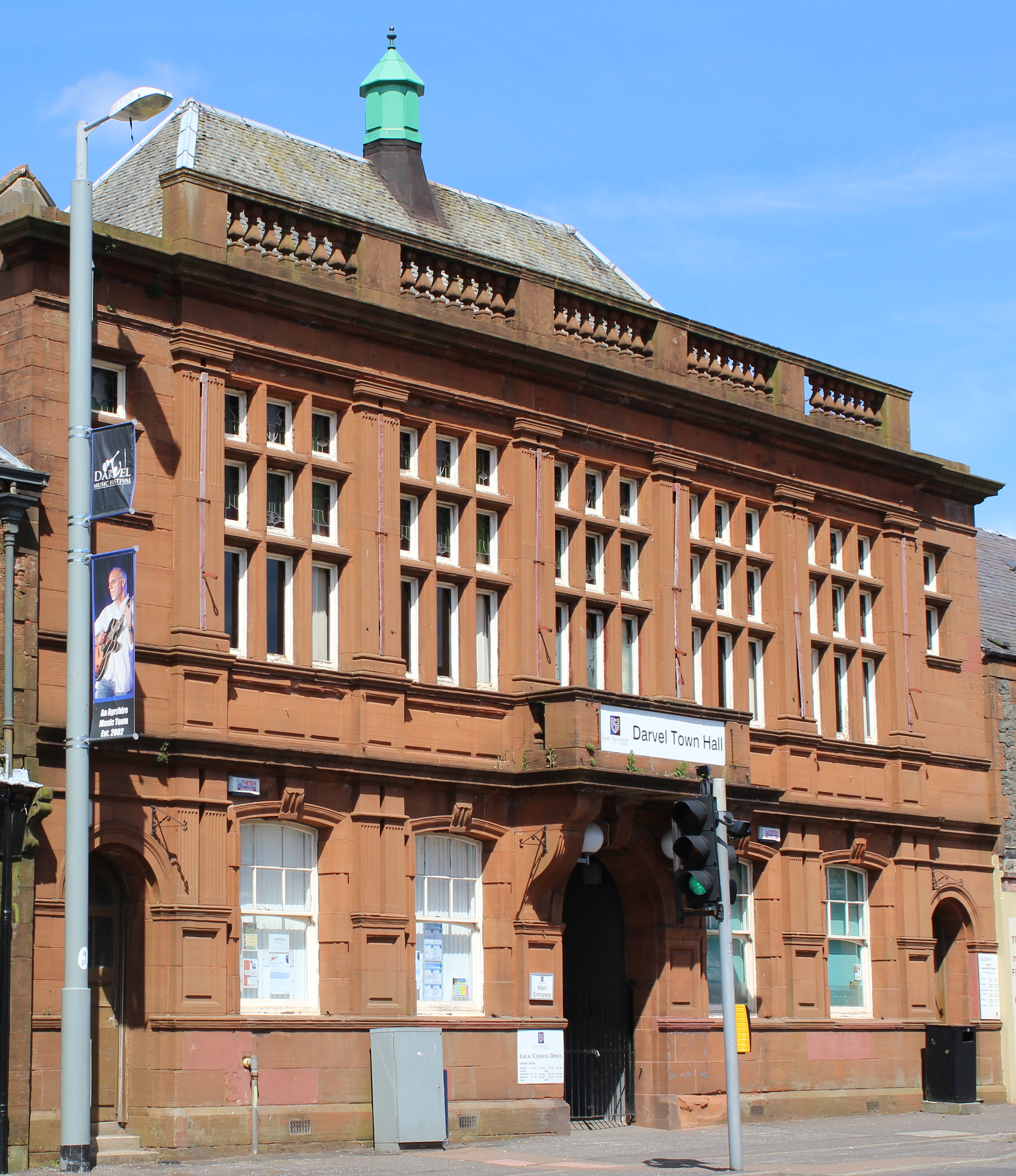
- Darvel Town Hall

- Shown in East Ayrshire
- 55.6098°N 4.2823°W
- Location: West Main Street, Darvel

History
- Built: 1905; 121 years ago

Site notes
- Architect: Thomas Henry Smith
- Architectural style: Neoclassical style

Listed Building – Category B
- Official name: Town Hall And Library, 10-12 West Main Street, Darvel
- Designated: 5 October 1992
- Reference no.: LB24493

Darvel Town Hall is a municipal building in West Main Street, Darvel, East Ayrshire, Scotland. The structure, which is used as a library and a community events venue, is a Category B listed building.

== History ==
Following significant population growth, largely associated with the manufacturing of curtains and carpets, Darvel became a police burgh in 1872. Initially, the burgh council had no dedicated meeting place but, in the late 19th century, they decided to procure a town hall. The site they selected was vacant land on the north side of West Main Street. The building was designed by Thomas Henry Smith in the neoclassical style, built in red sandstone and was completed in 1905.

The design involved a symmetrical main frontage with seven bays facing onto West Main Street. The central section of five bays, which slightly projected forward, featured a central round-headed opening with a moulded surround and a keystone flanked by brackets supporting a balcony. The other bays on the ground floor were fenestrated by segmental-headed sash windows with keystones, while the bays on the first floor were fenestrated by mullioned and transomed windows, which were separated by pilasters. The outer bays contained round headed doorways on the ground floor and narrow transomed windows on the first floor. At roof level, there was a balustraded parapet across the central section. Internally, the principal room was the main assembly hall with a seating capacity for 200 people.

The building continued to serve as the offices and meeting place of the burgh council for much of the 20th century, but ceased to be the local seat of government when the enlarged Kilmarnock and Loudoun District Council was formed in 1975. The building subsequently served as a community events venue as well as the home of the local public library. A small heritage museum was also established in the entrance foyer of the building: items collected included artefacts associated with the locally-born physician, Sir Alexander Fleming, and artefacts associated with the local lace-making industry.

Since 2002, the building has also been the main venue for the Darvel Music Festival, which is organised annually by Neil McKenna, and his wife Shelia.

== See also ==
- List of listed buildings in Darvel, East Ayrshire
