= Sophie von Kessel =

German actress

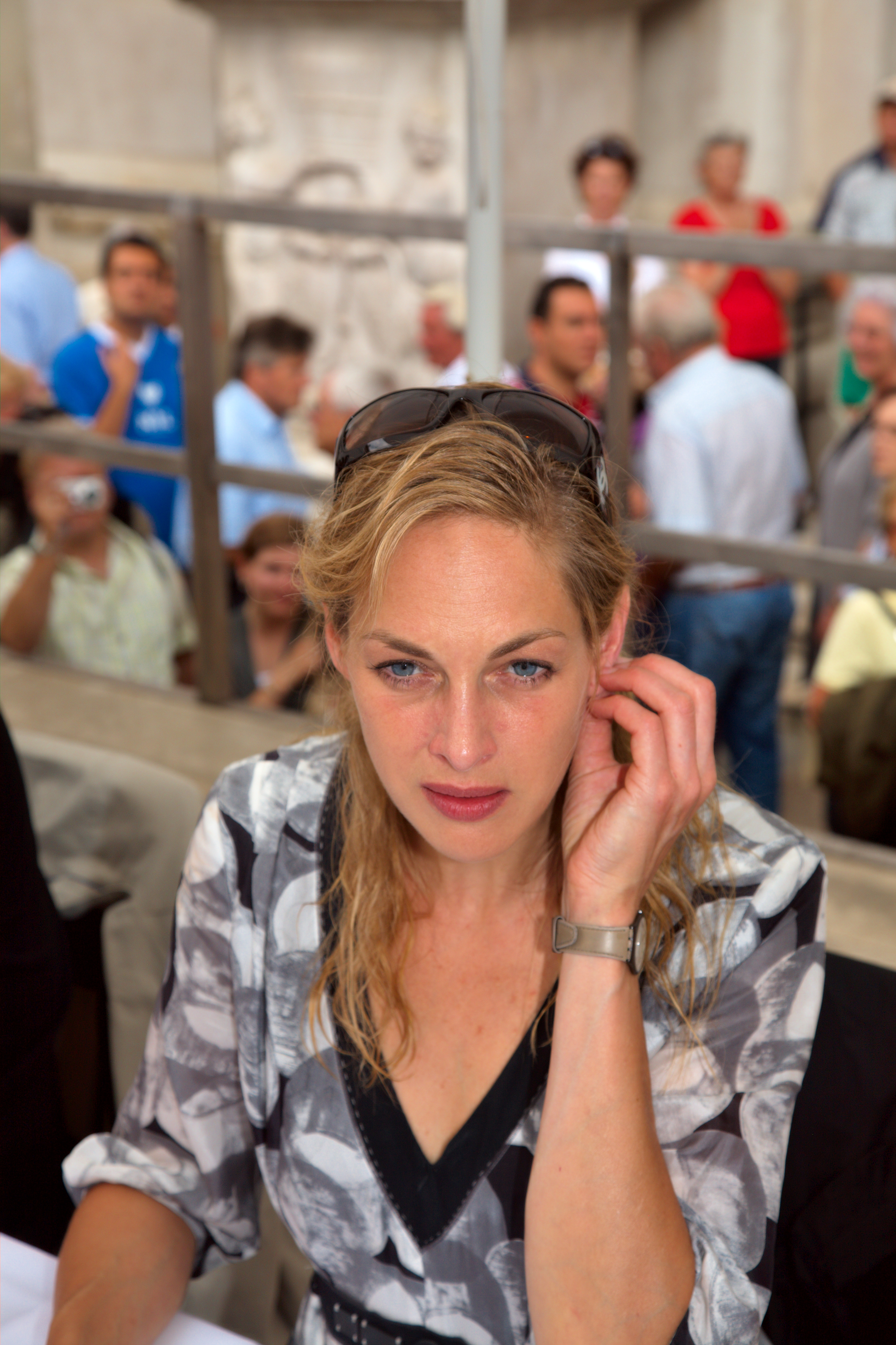
Actress Sophie von Kessel

Sophie von Kessel (born October 12, 1968 in Mexico City) is a German actress, best known for her roles in Schloß Hohenstein (1992–1995), The Dragon Ring (1994), Alles außer Mord (1994), and Der letzte Zeuge (2003). Von Kessel and actor Stefan Hunstein have a daughter and a son. They separated in 2011 after a ten-year relationship. She was in a relationship with Austrian director Martin Kušej until 2021. One of her cousins is the church musician Silvius von Kessel. Her younger sister Julie von Kessel was one of the first television reporters to report live on the terrorist attacks on September 11, 2001 for ZDF and is also an author.
