= Roderick Taylor =

American singer-songwriter

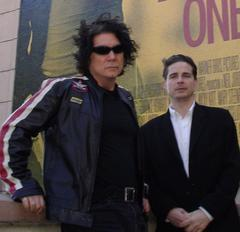
- Roderick Taylor and Bruce A. Taylor
- Born: United States
- Other names: Rod Taylor; Roderick Falconer
- Occupations: Screenwriter, poet, recording artist, television producer, television director
- Years active: 1972–present

Roderick Taylor, also known as Rod Taylor or Roderick Falconer, is an American poet, recording artist, screenwriter, television producer and television director.

Taylor is the father of screenwriter and television/film producer Bruce A. Taylor, with whom he often collaborates.

== Career ==
Taylor holds an MA from Stanford University where he was a Stegner Fellowship winner in poetry and where he later taught creative writing. Taylor is also a Woodrow Wilson fellowship winner and winner of the (American Academy of Poets Prize) for his first collection, Florida East Coast Champion (1972).

While still at Stanford, Taylor moonlighted as a singer in a rock band and started writing songs. He signed with Geffen Records and began a musical career that produced seven albums, principally under the name Roderick Falconer. Later, he wrote music for film and television, including the TV series Witchblade.

Taylor then began write story ideas and screenplays for television and film, often with his son Bruce, leading to the scripts for theatrical movies such as The Star Chamber and scripts for pilots like Annihilator and the Western-themed movies Kenny Rogers as The Gambler, Part III: The Legend Continues and Wild Horses. In 1985 he developed the science fiction series Otherworld, for which he served as narrator and also executive produced; the series failed to even run a full season. In 1998, he produced and directed his own scripted project, the 1998 television movie Inferno.

He wrote the scripts for American Outlaws (2001) The Brave One (2007). In 2009, Taylor and son Bruce completed work on Open Graves, a contemporary horror film.

He won a Golden Spur Award from the WWA for Wild Horses, and two Crystal Reel "Best Director" Awards for the Viacom series Super Force. In 1995 he was awarded the Genesis Award from the Ark Trust Foundation for his work as executive producer and writer of the MTV Dead at 21. In 2001 Rod and Bruce received a Prism Award Commendation for their work as writers / executive producers on the VH 1 At Any Cost, for which he also wrote and produced the songs.

When not writing for television and film Roderick teaches creative writing at Stanford University.

== Selected filmography ==
Film
Year	Film	Notes
1983	The Star Chamber	Writer
1990	Instant Karma	Director
2001	American Outlaws	Writer
2007	The Brave One	Writer
2009	Open Graves	Writer, Executive Producer
Television
Year	Title	Notes
1985	Otherworld	Writer, 8 episodes Narrator, 8 episodes Executive Producer, 8 episodes
1986	Annihilator	Writer, Executive Producer
1989–1992	Super Force	Writer, 33 episodes Director, 3 episodes Executive Producer, 33 episodes
1994	Dead at 21	Writer, 12 episodes Executive Producer, 12 episodes
1998	Inferno	Writer, Producer
2000	At Any Cost	Writer, Producer
2001–2002	Witchblade	Writer, 3 episodes

== Discography ==
=== Albums ===
- Rod Taylor (Asylum, 1973)
- New Nation (United Artists, 1976)
- Victory in Rock City (United Artists, 1977)
- Straight (Metronome Musik [Germany], 1980)
- Rules of Attraction (MCA, 1984)

== Poetry ==
- Florida East Coast Champion Photo by Annie Leibovitz
- the sex life of fire
