= Schloß Hohenstein (TV series) =

- Created by: Christiane Sadlo
- Starring: Sophie von Kessel; Mathieu Carrière; Ruth Maria Kubitschek; Gudrun Landgrebe
- Country of origin: Germany

Schloß Hohenstein is a German television series.

== See also ==
- List of German television series
