= The Star Chamber =

1983 film by Peter Hyams

- Theatrical release poster
- Directed by: Peter Hyams
- Screenplay by: Roderick Taylor; Peter Hyams
- Story by: Roderick Taylor
- Produced by: Frank Yablans
- Starring: Michael Douglas; Hal Holbrook; Yaphet Kotto; Sharon Gless
- Cinematography: Richard Hannah
- Edited by: James Mitchell
- Music by: Michael Small
- Production company: Frank Yablans Presentations
- Distributed by: 20th Century Fox
- Release date: August 5, 1983
- Running time: 109 minutes
- Country: United States
- Language: English
- Budget: $8 million
- Box office: $5.6 million

The Star Chamber is a 1983 American crime thriller film starring Michael Douglas, Hal Holbrook, Yaphet Kotto, Sharon Gless, James B. Sikking, and Joe Regalbuto. The film was written by Roderick Taylor and Peter Hyams and directed by Hyams. Its title is taken from the name of the Star Chamber, a 15th−17th-century English court.

== Plot ==
Judge Steven Hardin (Michael Douglas) is an idealistic Los Angeles judge who becomes frustrated when the technicalities of the law prevent the prosecution of three criminals. The first is a man who was charged with murdering several elderly women for their welfare money. The second and third are two men who were accused of raping and killing a young boy named Daniel Lewin as part of a suspected child pornography ring.

The suspected child murderers, Lawrence Monk and Arthur Cooms, attracted the attention of two police officers when they were driving slowly late at night. The police officers suspected that the van's occupants might be burglars. After checking the license plate for violations, the officers pulled the van over for expired paperwork. They also claimed to have smelled marijuana, and then saw a bloody shoe inside the van. However, the reason for stopping the van turned out to be spurious: the paperwork was actually submitted on time, it was merely processed late.

Since the traffic stop was illegal, based on the fruit of the poisonous tree doctrine, Hardin has no choice but to exclude any evidence discovered as a result of the traffic stop, including the bloody shoe. Hardin becomes even more distraught when Daniel's father, Dr. Harold Lewin, attempts to shoot Monk and Cooms in court, but misses and shoots one of the arresting officers instead; Dr. Lewin is arrested.

While on a visit to Dr. Lewin, Hardin learns that another boy had been discovered by the police, raped and murdered in the same manner as Daniel. Outraged, Hardin visits his friend, Judge Caulfield (Hal Holbrook), who tells him of the existence of a modern-day Star Chamber, a group of judges that identifies criminals who cannot be brought to justice through the judicial system, and takes action against them using a hired assassin. As there is a vacancy present, one of the judges, James Culhane, had committed suicide earlier, Hardin participates in two of the Star Chamber proceedings, and the assassin is dispatched to kill two other unrelated murderers who were released on technicalities despite their own confessions.

After receiving a phone call that Dr. Lewin has committed suicide by overdosing on sleeping pills while in jail, Hardin contracts the assassin to murder Monk and Cooms. Police detective Harry Lowes (Yaphet Kotto) learns from a car thief named Stanley Flowers that three men were actually responsible for the crime.

While at a party, Hardin learns about the new evidence. Realizing that he and the Star Chamber have just sentenced Monk and Cooms to die for a crime that they did not commit, Hardin implores the Star Chamber to recall the assassin, but is told by the other judges that the hit cannot be canceled. For the judges' protection, there is a cut-out between them and the assassin; they do not know who he is, and he doesn't know who they are. They tell Hardin that, although an occasional mistake is inevitable and regrettable, what they are doing still serves society's greater good. They argue that Monk and Cooms are clearly criminals who are guilty of numerous other crimes, even if they are not guilty of the specific crime for which the group convicted them.

Hardin makes it clear that he does not accept their reasoning, and Caulfield warns him to back down because the members of the group will do whatever they have to in order to protect themselves. Hardin decides to make an effort to stop Monk and Cooms from being killed, so he tracks them down in an abandoned warehouse and attempts to warn them. However, Hardin has stumbled across their illegal drug operation, and they don't believe him. They attack Hardin, but the hitman, disguised as a police officer, arrives and kills both of them before they can kill Hardin. The hitman prepares to kill Hardin, but Lowes arrives at the last moment and kills the hitman.

Finally, as the Star Chamber decides another "case" without Hardin, Hardin sits with Lowes outside in a car, recording their conversation.

== Cast ==
- Michael Douglas as Superior Court Judge Steven R. Hardin
- Hal Holbrook as Judge Benjamin Caulfield
- Yaphet Kotto as Det. Harry Lowes
- Sharon Gless as Emily Hardin
- James B. Sikking as Dr. Harold Lewin
- Joe Regalbuto as Arthur Cooms
- Don Calfa as Lawrence Monk
- David Faustino as Tony Hardin
- Larry Hankin as Det. Kenneth Wiggan
- Dick Anthony Williams as Det. Paul Mackey
- DeWayne Jessie as Stanley Flowers
- David Proval as Officer Nelson
- Robin Gammell as Judge Archer
- Matthew Faison as Judge Stoner
- Fred McCarren as Judge Karras
- Michael Ensign as Judge Kirkland
- Jason Bernard as Judge Bocho
- Jerry Taft as Judge Fogelson
- Mike Austin as Judge Lang
- Sheldon Feldner as Judge James Culhane
- Keith Buckley as the assassin
- Diana Douglas as Adrian Caulfield
- Frances Bergen as Mrs. Cummins
- Robert Costanzo as Sgt. Spota
- Charles Hallahan as Officer Pickett (uncredited)

== Production ==
The Star Chamber was given a budget of $8 million.

Hyams said "I wanted first and foremost to make a film that is connected to an issue, not whether a bunch of judges getting together and ordering people's deaths is a credibility problem. The issue is the breakdown of the legal system and the resulting hysteria of crime . . . I was nervous about how young I could make Judge Hardin (Douglas), but I spent a lot of time at the Superior Court and there are silver foxes, sure, but there are also quite a few good-looking, 40-year-old judges on the bench."

== Reception ==
The Star Chamber grossed $5.6 million.

=== Critical response ===
Review aggregator Rotten Tomatoes gives The Star Chamber a score of 71% based on reviews from 14 critics and a rating of 6 out of 10.

Critic Roger Ebert wrote: "The Star Chamber works brilliantly until it locks into a plot. Then it stops dancing and starts marching. The movie opens with a series of intriguing scenes showing a series of shocking miscarriages of justice. Fiends and perverts are caught red-handed, confess to their crimes and then are put back on the streets again because of minor legal technicalities. [...] The ending of the movie was especially infuriating."

Critic Janet Maslin of The New York Times wrote: "Peter Hyams has shown himself, with films like Busting, Outland, and Capricorn One, to be a stylish, flippant director, capable of generating a great deal of suspense as well as action scenes that really pack a wallop. The Star Chamber, which opens today at Loews Tower East and other theaters, begins so excitingly that Mr. Hyams appears to have outdone himself. [...] But The Star Chamber can't live up to its own initial promise – nor does it really live up to Mr. Hyams's. His powerhouse style finally sabotages the issues raised by The Star Chamber, which remain much more delicate than the treatment they have been given here.

== Release ==
The Star Chamber was released in theatres on August 5, 1983.

=== Home media ===
The film was released on VHS by CBS/Fox Video in 1984 and reissued by FoxVideo in the 1990s. It was on DVD in 2005, and then on Blu-ray on May 28, 2013, by 20th Century Fox Home Entertainment and is and has since the 2010s been available online through Apple's iTunes Store downloadable application and Amazon's, Vudu's and YouTube's websites.

== TV Series ==
In April 2020 it was announced Amazon had a TV series in development based on the film.

== Bibliography ==
- Machlowi, David S. (October 1983). Lawyer on the Aisle. Chicago: American Bar Association. p. 1548.
- Levi, Ross D. (2005). The Celluloid Courtroom: A History of Legal Cinema. Santa Barbara, California: Praeger Publishers. p. 39. ISBN 978-0275982331.
- Solomon, Aubrey (1988). Twentieth Century-Fox: A Corporate and Financial History. Lanham, Maryland: Scarecrow Press. p. 260. ISBN 978-0810842441.
