= Open Graves =

- Directed by: Álvaro de Armiñán
- Written by: Bruce A. Taylor; Roderick Taylor
- Produced by: Antonio Cuadri; Billy Dietrich; Juan Carlos Orihuela
- Starring: Eliza Dushku; Mike Vogel; Naike Rivelli; Lindsay Robba
- Edited by: Alchemedia Films; Manufacturas Audiovisuales; Open Pictures
- Music by: Fernando Ortí Salvador
- Distributed by: Voltage Pictures
- Release dates: September 7, 2009 (Semana Internacional de Cine Fantastico Estepona)
- Running time: 100 minutes
- Countries: United States; Spain
- Language: English
- Budget: $6.5 million

Open Graves is a 2009 horror film directed by Álvaro de Armiñán and written by Bruce A. Taylor and Roderick Taylor. The film stars Eliza Dushku, Mike Vogel, Naike Rivelli, and Lindsay Robba.

== Plot ==
In medieval Spain, a witch named Mamba was tortured and skinned alive as punishment for her crimes. Her skin and organs were then used to make a cursed game named after her. The player who wins the game is granted a wish; however, the player who loses the game is killed in a fashion predicted by the game.

In the present day, Jason acquires the board game from a disabled shop owner called Malek. After rain causes his friend Tomas's beachhouse party to end, another partygoer, Erica, suggests that the remaining friends — including Jason, Tomas, Tomas's girlfriend Lisa, Elena, Miguel, and Pablo — play the game.

Pablo is eliminated and takes Tomas's car to get a beer. He falls off a cliff and a group of crabs attacks him, gouging out his eyes and killing him. Miguel, Lisa, Elena, and Tomas also lose the game, before Detective Izar arrives and informs the group of Pablo's death, cutting the game short.

The group attends Pablo's funeral, where Erica realizes that his death mirrors the game's prediction. Tomas, Lisa, and Miguel travel to Miguel's family's empty wood-cutting factory to have a photo shoot. Lisa begins to feel unwell and leaves with Tomas. Alone, Miguel falls into a group of snakes that kill him.

Jason and Erica start a romance. While they are in Jason's car, they witness ghostly versions of Pablo and Miguel, before learning about Miguel's death. They meet Tomas, Lisa, and Elena and explain they suspect that the friends are dying because of the game. Lisa becomes sicker; the following morning, she has aged into an old woman and is rushed to the hospital.

Jason, Erica, and Elena tell Detective Izar their theory about the game. Lisa soon dies, prompting Jason, Erica, and Tomas to seek answers from Malek. They find Malek at his home, but he is no longer disabled; he explains that he won the game and wished to be cured of his disability. Meanwhile, Elena is traveling home when she is involved in a car accident and burns to death. Jason, Erica, and Tomas go to Jason's house, where they find Detective Izar looking for the game. Jason and Erica escape with it, but Tomas is caught by the detective. When he attempts to escape, Izar shoots him dead.

At Tomas's beachfront house, Jason and Erica decide to play the game in the hope that they can win and wish for it to be a week in the past so their friends will be alive again. Erica is eliminated and learns that her death will involve the sea; Jason wins and will get his wish as long as he passes the game on to another person. Erica realizes that she must die for Jason to get his wish, so she enters the sea. Jason rushes out to save her, but Detective Izar shows up and leaves with the game. Erica emerges from the sea now possessed by Mamba, who grants Jason his wish that they never played the game. However, Jason and his friends end up trapped in an endless time loop as a result of his wish, forced to relive the week again and again.

== Cast ==
- Eliza Dushku as Erica/Mamba
- Mike Vogel as Jason
- Naike Rivelli as Elena
- Ethan Rains as Tomás
- Lindsay Caroline Robba as Lisa
- Gary Piquer as Detective Izar
- Alex O'Dogherty as Malek
- Ander Pardo as Miguel
- Boris Martinez as Pablo
- Jose Casasús as Novio
- Lilliam Kouri as Malek's Wife
- Martxelo Rubio as Police Officer
- Enrique Zaldua as Detective / Police Officer

== Production ==
The film was shot in Spain from October to November 2006 under the working title Mamba in Getxo, Sopelana, Mundaka, Vizcaya, País Vasco and Madrid. The movie has been picked up for distribution by Voltage Pictures and was released in 2009. The official trailer and poster were released on February 26, 2008.

== Soundtrack ==
The rock band Showpay recorded seven songs for the soundtrack, and shot a music video in which their members played "Mamba" and died. The soundtrack has been composed by Fernando Orti Salvador and recorded in Bratislava with the Bratislava Symphony Orchestra, conducted by David Hernando.

== Release ==
The film premiered on Syfy on 19 September 2009. Lionsgate released the DVD on 23 February 2010. The UK DVD was released on 15 February 2010 over Icon Home Entertainment.

== Mamba board game ==
In the movie's universe, the fictional game's board and pieces were made from the skin and body of a witch named Mamba Mosamba who was executed after having been tried and convicted of witchcraft during the Spanish Inquisition under Torquemada. The game consists of a wooden case with a dragonfly motif, a board with sequential spaces laid out in a spiral, an instruction sheet, small wooden playing pieces, two dice, a set of cards, and a central tower with two snakes and a dial.

The object of the game is for a player to get their playing piece to the center space, and then place that piece in the correct snake's mouth. Spaces are either safety spots known as "Windows of Heaven" or spaces with Grim Reapers known as "Open Graves," which cause the player to draw a card. If the card is an Epitaph (a card with the words Vae Victis written below), the player who drew it is dead. If the card is not an Epitaph card, that player is safe.

Even if all but one player is dead, that player must continue playing until they reach the center. They do not need to reach the center space by exact count. Once there, they must ask the tower one question and place the playing piece in either the mouth of the black snake Spatium (Space) or of the white snake Tempus (Time). If they choose correctly, their wish comes true. If they choose incorrectly, they suffer the same fate as the witch: being skinned alive. Even if they choose correctly, the wish does not come true until all the players are dead from the effects of the Epitaph cards drawn during the game and the game is passed onto someone else.
