= Annett Fleischer =

German presenter and actress

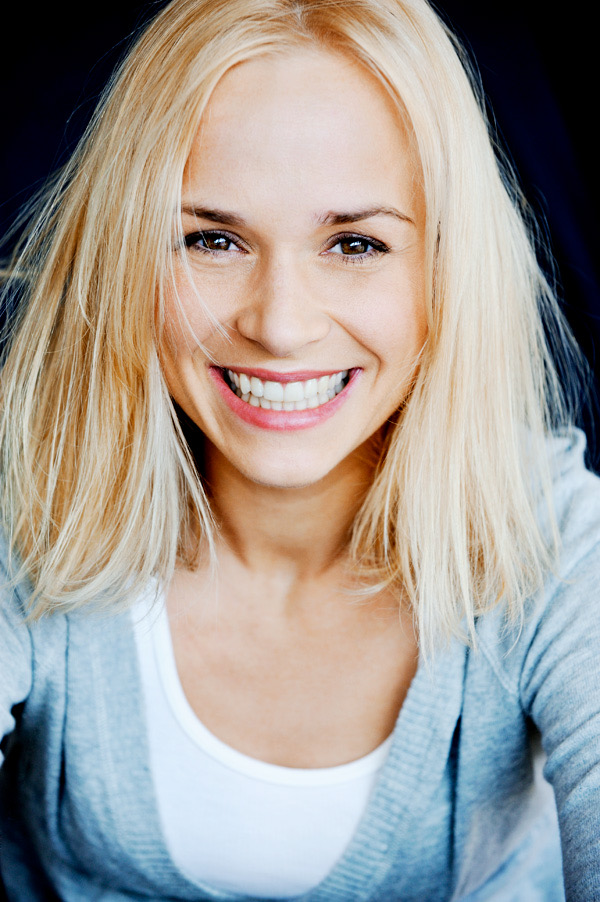
- Born: 21 June 1979 (age 47); East Berlin, East Germany

Annett Fleischer (born 21 June 1979) is a German presenter and actress.

Fleischer was born in East Berlin growing up as an only child in the districts of Lichtenberg and Hoppegarten. After graduation from high school in 1999, she left the city to study in Hamburg. In 2003 while at the University of Lüneburg she took up an invitation to a casting for the ZDF youth series Bravo TV. She continues to live in Berlin.

== Training ==
Annett Fleischer studied communications and marketing in Hamburg and then continued her studies in applied cultural sciences at the University of Lüneburg. Parallel to school and study time, she regularly took acting lessons in Berlin. In addition to working as an actress, she also works as a presenter in the TV and event sector. She initially gained her experience as a presenter through various fashion shows and music events. As of 2018 she is mainly occupied as a presenter in her preferred areas of social affairs, health, society, culture, art, music, business and innovation.

In 2011/2012 she completed an additional course of study, "School of Happiness", at the Ernst Fritz-Schubert Institute in Heidelberg. Based on this training, she prefers giving young people special life-realistic lessons and supporting the educators with advice.

== Television ==
Fleischer's first regular commission was the 2002 ZDF series Bravo T. After which she was the lead actress of the TV series Zehr in NDR, Tramitz and Friends (Pro7) and the comedy, hidden-camera sketches in Böse Mädchen (2007) on RTL. Since 2011 in the crime-comedy series Hubert und Staller she plays the tough police sergeant Sonja Wirth next to Christian Tramitz and Helmfried von Lüttichau. In 2011 she made guest appearances in the action series Alarm für Cobra 11 – Die Autobahnpolizei (Alarm for Cobra 1- the Motorway Police) on RTL in the episode Familienangelegenheiten (Family Affairs) and in the Großstadtrevier. In the successful 2008 ZDF series SOKO Wismar she played the role of Marion Meer. In 2010, she starred in Countdown – Die Jagd beginnt in the episode Aussage gegen Aussage.

In 2006 and 2007, Fleischer presented Studioeins, the early evening program of Das Erste, the main nationwide publicly owned German TV channel. From 2007 to 2008 she had her first talk-format on the Swiss TV channel Star TV Talk with Annett. She frequently appears as a reporter for Sat 1 (Kerner) or RTL (e.g. Explosiv – Das Magazin). On ZDFneo in 2012 she presented Traumhaus-Duell together with Florian Simbeck. Since 2011 she is the Keno-"fairy" for the German Lotto and Totoblock.

== Playboy ==
In the July 2016 issue of the German Playboy magazine published a photo series with Annett Fleischer featuring the actress on the cover. The series was produced by the German photographer Sabine Liewald. The shooting took place at various locations in Zurich.

== Volunteering ==
In 2011, together with the journalist and author Sven Kuntze, she founded the non-profit organization "Netzwerk des Lebens e. V.". Together they develop solutions to meet the loneliness of especially elderly people. She is a regular volunteer and offers an individual program for old people.

Annett Fleischer has been an active member of the Berlin Children and Youth Association Kids & Co. e. V. Since 2013 she is patron of the PulsCamp Berlin and motivates the children and young people to volunteer. She regularly gives workshops for the 8.-10. Classes in the district of Berlin-Hellersdorf – Berlin-Marzahn, in the framework of pre-employment measures or as a life and school support for behavioral adolescents.

== Filmography ==
- 2003–2004: Bravo TV, ZDF
- 2004: Axel! will's wissen, episode "Tanz oder gar nicht", Sat.1, as Candy
- 2005: Verliebt in Berlin, episode 74–75, Sat.1, as Verena Prinz
- 2004–2006: Tramitz and Friends, Pro7, different roles
- 2007: Alarm für Cobra 11, episode "Totalverlust", RTL
- 2007: Ossi's Eleven
- 2006–2013: Böse Mädchen, RTL
- 2008: Für meine Kinder tu ich alles, Sat.1, as Personalleiterin
- 2009: SOKO Wismar, episode "Liebe steckt an", ZDF, as Marion Meer
- 2010: Countdown – Die Jagd beginnt, episode "Aussage gegen Aussage", RTL, as Olga
- 2010: Alarm für Cobra 11, episode "Familienangelegenheiten", RTL, as Anna Kurz
- 2011-2017: Hubert und Staller, ARD, as Sonja Wirth
- 2011: Großstadtrevier, episode "Wunderbare Zukunft", ARD, as Jessica Meyerhoff
- 2011: Die Draufgänger, episode 1 "Das Paket", RTL, as Gaby Zaufke
- 2017: In aller Freundschaft – Die jungen Ärzte (episode Carpe Diem)
- 2017: Die Luther Matrix
