= Katharina Müller-Elmau =

German actress (born 1965)

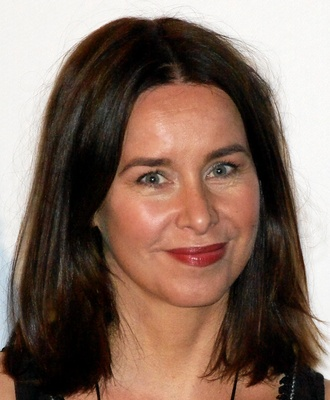
Katharina Müller-Elmau in 2010

Katharina Müller-Elmau (born 13 September 1965 in Göttingen) is a German actress.

== Selected filmography ==
- Three D (1988)
- Japaner sind die besseren Liebhaber (1995)
- Eine ungehorsame Frau (1998, TV film)
- Marlene (2000)
- Vincent Wants to Sea (2010)
- Mein Lover, sein Vater und ich! (2014, TV film)
- Hubert ohne Staller (since 2019, TV series)
