= At Any Cost (film) =

2000 American TV film

- Genre: Drama
- Written by: Roderick Taylor; Bruce A. Taylor
- Directed by: Charles Winkler
- Music by: Joel Goldsmith (composer)
- Country of origin: United States
- Original language: English

Production
- Executive producer: Spencer Proffer
- Producer: Howard Griffith
- Cinematography: Robert Steadman
- Editor: Clayton Halsey
- Running time: 89 minutes
- Production companies: Charter Films Inc. Meteor 17; Wilshire Court Productions

Original release
- Network: VH1
- Release: August 16, 2000

At Any Cost is a 2000 television film directed by Charles Winkler that was broadcast on VH1 as part of its "Movies That Rock" series at 9:00 p.m. Eastern Time on August 16, 2000.

== Plot ==
The band Beyond Gravity from Austin, Texas, consisting of vocalist Lance, his wife Chelsea on bass, his brother Mike on guitar, and his best friend on drums, is looking to make it big and signs with manager Ben of the small independent label Psychotrope. The label management is uncomfortable with Mike's drug use and wants him out of the band.

Mike attempts to quit cold turkey in order to stay in the band, but Ben facilitates Mike's hasty exit by bringing heroin to his apartment and witnessing him overdose. Ben stays silent about his role in Mike's death as he hastily negotiates a record release and tour for the band. Chelsea sacrifices her place in the band to stay home and raise her and Lance's son Pete.

With two new band members, Beyond Gravity sets out on tour. Chelsea visits Lance at his hotel when he is in New Jersey but finds him in his room with a different woman, causing the two to split up. Beyond Gravity gains radio airplay, only to find that they cannot obtain any sales because stores are not stocking their album. Lance complains to Ben, who says that they should leave Psychotrope and join his new label Huge Records, which he recently created in order to be able to sign an exclusive deal with the hot new act Strange Divas and obtain a distribution deal with Warner Brothers. Ben gets a call from the Strange Divas and leaves the room to take it, then Lance argues with Mike's former girlfriend Rebecca about the fact that she is now Ben's girlfriend.

Chelsea gets in a car crash and Pete ends up in the hospital. Lance goes to the hospital and attempts to reconcile with Chelsea. Ben calls and demands that he return for the remaining dates of the tour, but Lance refuses. At an industry party, a Warner Brothers executive congratulates Ben on the success of Strange Divas and inquires about the sophomore album by Beyond Gravity, but Ben replies that the band is on hiatus. Ben introduces himself to Juliette, a new artist, and gives her his home phone number.

Lance sings some of his new songs to Chelsea, winning her over and getting back together with her. She sends a tape of the songs to producer Dennis Berg, who shows interest. Meanwhile, a Treasury Records executive offers to buy Huge Records from Ben for 10 million dollars. He tells Ben that Treasury Records is about to be purchased by ZN Media and suggests that he sell Huge Records for stock instead of cash, since he expects that the value of the stock will increase significantly with its purchase by ZN Media, but warns Ben that it is insider trading and that he could go to jail for it. Ben agrees to the deal anyway.

Dennis Berg offers to produce Beyond Gravity's next album, so Lance and Chelsea visit Ben to discuss having Berg be the new producer. Chelsea finds Rebecca doing cocaine to compensate for her dissatisfaction with her relationship with Ben. Ben rejects the idea of bringing in Dennis Berg and instead shows Lance the artwork for a new album of live tracks and three unapproved demos that Ben mixed himself for the release. Lance is upset and threatens to sue Ben if he releases Gravity Live.

Ben begins sleeping with Juliette. Rebecca notices Juliette giving Ben attention and argues with him. When she says that Mike was twice the man Ben will ever be, he asks her why she aborted his baby. Rebecca breaks up with Ben and goes to stay with Lance and Chelsea. She tells them that she only told Mike about the abortion the night he died. Lance wonders how Ben knew about it and pieces together that Ben must have been with Mike the night he died.

Lance storms over to Ben's house and breaks in through a glass door, causing Ben to call the police. He accuses Ben of murdering Mike and taking his girlfriend out of jealousy. During a physical fight, Ben throws Lance over a railing, leaving him unconscious. Ben grabs a phone to call 911. The police arrive and mistake the phone for a gun, then shoot and kill Ben. Lance wakes up in the hospital, where Chelsea tells him that Ben is dead. Chelsea joins the band again and they continue their musical career together.

== Cast ==
- Eddie Mills as Lance
- Glenn Quinn as Ben
- James Franco as Mike
- Maureen Flannigan as Chelsea
- Cyia Batten as Rebecca
- JD Evermore as Cop #1
- Sara Overall
- Hamilton Loomis as Trevor
- Tim Cotto as Joe Simon
- Gene Simmons as Dennis Berg
- Jesse Adams as Apartment Manager
- Jason Bozzi as Coupe DeVille
- George Brock as Photographer
- Big Skinny Brown as Max
- Michael J. Bevan (as Michael Bevan) as Pete
- Greg Corner as Rabid Fan
- Joshua Mercurio Drapehs as Posse Member
- Andrew Hlinsky as Young Lance
- Buddy Howard as Rabid Fan
- Kris Keyes as Lexus
- Christina Lee as Blues Waitress
- Erica Neff as Spotlight Diva
- Greg Onofrio as DJ Tony "The Snake"
- Guy Roberts as Danny Gershon
- Bryan Ryan as Bartender
- Michael Schwab as Young Mike
- LaTeace Towns as Juliette
- Libby Villari
- Debroah Abbott (uncredited) as Band Groupie
- Britney Crosson (uncredited) as Concert Dancer
- Jeremy Denzlinger (uncredited) as Record Label Exec.
- Christina Mauro (uncredited) as Girl at Party
- Meghan Sanders (uncredited) as Band Groupie
- Sheila Sawyer (uncredited) as Darla
- David Sharm (uncredited) as Beyond Gravity Fan
- Tracy Raney (uncredited) as Beyond Gravity Fan
- Spyke (uncredited) as Roadie / Party Goer / Audience Member
- Jeff Yaworski (uncredited extra)

== Production ==
Some scenes were shot in Houston, Texas.

== Broadcast ==
At Any Cost was broadcast on VH1 as part of its "Movies That Rock" series at 9:00 p.m. Eastern Time on August 16, 2000. The film was rated R.

== Reception ==
The website southcoasttoday.com wrote, "With a solid, good-looking cast, it's a shame that 'At Any Cost' takes itself just so seriously. While Franco makes the most of his shaggy-dog junkie role, Mill's Lance is earnest beyond endurance."

The German website kinofilmwelt.de wrote, "The success and suffering of the group 'Beyond Gravity' will not necessarily surprise viewers with its dramaturgy that is typical for TV. But with its numerous stage sequences and watchable actors, the movie is an enjoyable evening filler, not just for music lovers."

== Accolades ==
The film was nominated for a 2001 Prism Award for TV Movie, Miniseries or Dramatic Special.

== Soundtrack ==
The soundtrack At Any Cost - Music from the VH1 Original Movie was released on August 8, 2000, in advance of the film's broadcast. The songs attributed to Beyond Gravity were co-produced by Andrew Rollins and Steve Plunkett.

The Barenaked Ladies song "Pinch Me" appeared on the soundtrack album one day after being released as a single and one month before appearing on the band's Maroon album.

=== Tracklist ===
1. Barenaked Ladies – "Pinch Me" 4:47
2. Eagle-Eye Cherry – "Been Here Once Before" 3:51
3. Beyond Gravity – "Beat from Undergorund" 3:13
4. Beyond Gravity – "Meant for You" 3:11
5. Beyond Gravity – "Don't Look Back" 3:24
6. Beyond Gravity – "Happens Every Day" 3:26
7. Andreas Johnson – "Glorious" 3:32
8. Deckard – "What Reason" 3:15
9. Kevin Martin – "Thoughtless Innuendos" 4:25
10. Beyond Gravity – "Talking with Your Eyes" 2:58
11. Beyond Gravity – "It's over You" 2:52
