= Annihilator (film) =

- French home video cover
- Genre: Horror; Science Fiction; Thriller
- Written by: Bruce A. Taylor; Roderick Taylor
- Directed by: Michael Chapman
- Starring: Mark Lindsay Chapman; Catherine Mary Stewart; Lisa Blount; Susan Blakely
- Theme music composer: Udi Harpaz; Sylvester Levay
- Country of origin: United States
- Original language: English

Production
- Executive producer: Roderick Taylor
- Production locations: Crestline, California; Los Angeles
- Cinematography: Paul Goldsmith
- Editor: Frank Mazzola
- Running time: 99 minutes
- Production company: Universal Television

Original release
- Network: NBC
- Release: April 7, 1986

Annihilator is a 1986 science fiction television film directed by Michael Chapman and starring Mark Lindsay Chapman, Catherine Mary Stewart, Susan Blakely and Lisa Blount. It was an unsold pilot for a potential TV series.

== Premise ==
A newspaper reporter, Robert Armour, is in a romantic relationship with another reporter, Angela Taylor. Angela and her friend Cindy (a photographer for the paper) take a flight to Hawaii. When Angela and Cindy return from the vacation, they act strangely, causing Robert to be concerned, and the women turn out to be androids who try to kill Robert. An alien force planning on taking over the world caused Flight 508 to disappear; they abducted the human passengers and replaced them with identical-looking androids. Robert now becomes the hunter and hunted, knowing he must hunt down the androids.

== Cast ==
- Mark Lindsay Chapman as Robert Armour
- Susan Blakely as Layla
- Lisa Blount as Cindy
- Brion James as Biker
- Earl Boen as Sid
- Geoffrey Lewis as Prof. Alan Jeffries
- Catherine Mary Stewart as Angela Taylor
- Nicole Eggert as Elyse Jeffries
- Paul Brinegar as Pops
- Barry Pearl as Eddie
- Barbara Townsend as Celia Evans
- Channing Chase as Susan Weiss
- Glen Vernon as Henry Evans
- Richard Partlow as FBI Agent #2
- Biff Yeager as FBI Agent #1

== Awards ==
- 1986: Primetime Emmy Award – Nomination in the Outstanding Achievement in Makeup for a Miniseries or a Special category for Michael Westmore and Zoltan Elek
