= Darvel =

Coordinates: 55.610035°N 4.280882°W

Darvel: Scottish Gaelic: Darbhail; Scots: Dairvel
- Town
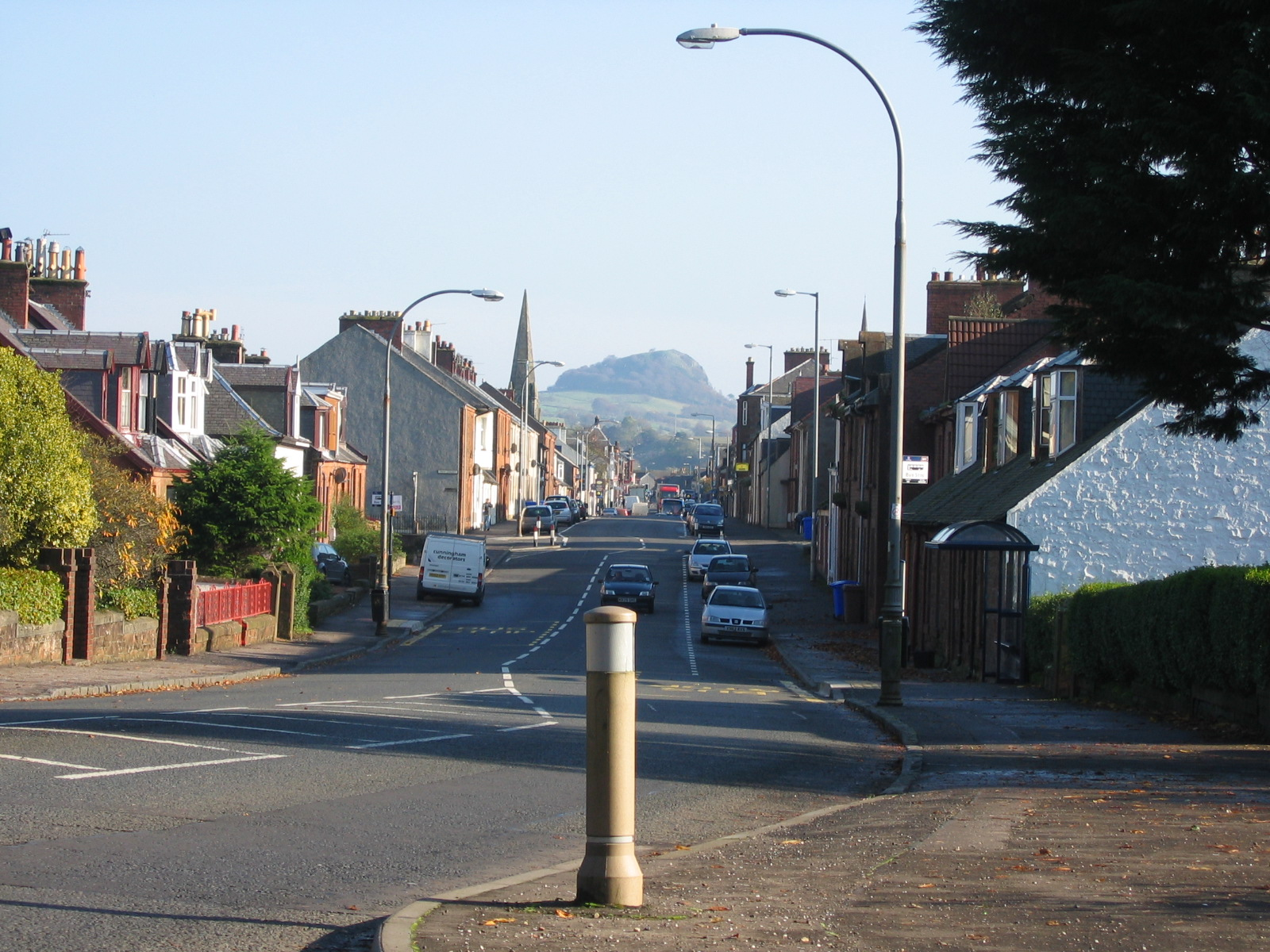
- Darvel main street showing Loudoun Hill in the background

- Location within East Ayrshire
- Population: 3,900 (2020)
- OS grid reference: NS564375
- Council area: East Ayrshire
- Lieutenancy area: Ayrshire and Arran
- Country: Scotland
- Sovereign state: United Kingdom
- Post town: DARVEL
- Postcode district: KA17
- Dialling code: 01560
- Police: Scotland
- Fire: Scottish
- Ambulance: Scottish
- UK Parliament: Kilmarnock and Loudoun
- Scottish Parliament: Kilmarnock and Irvine Valley

Darvel (Scots: Dairvel, Scottish Gaelic: Darbhail) is a town in East Ayrshire, Scotland. It is at the eastern end of the Irvine Valley and is sometimes referred to as "The Lang Toon" (English: the Long Town).

The town's Latin motto, Non sibi sed cunctis, means "Not for ourselves, but for others".

== History ==
=== Prehistory and archaeology ===
Archaeological excavations and surveys, between 2003 and 2007, by Glasgow University Archaeological Research Division (GUARD) in advance of the extension to the Loudoun Hill Quarry, found that people had been living in the area between the Mesolithic and the Late Iron Age periods. In the earliest periods the area was covered by woodlands and those were probably still undisturbed.

An additional excavation, in 2007, found a rare late medieval farmstead. The pottery and radiocarbon dates indicate that the farm was occupied in the 14th–15th centuries. It is thought that this site belonged to the farm of Newton, which was first documented in the late 14th century within the parish of Galston. At that time the parish of Galston belonged to the Lockhart family.

Roman settlements have been found at the base of Loudoun Hill on Allanton Plain and visible at one point from the Windy Wizzen.

=== Modern history ===
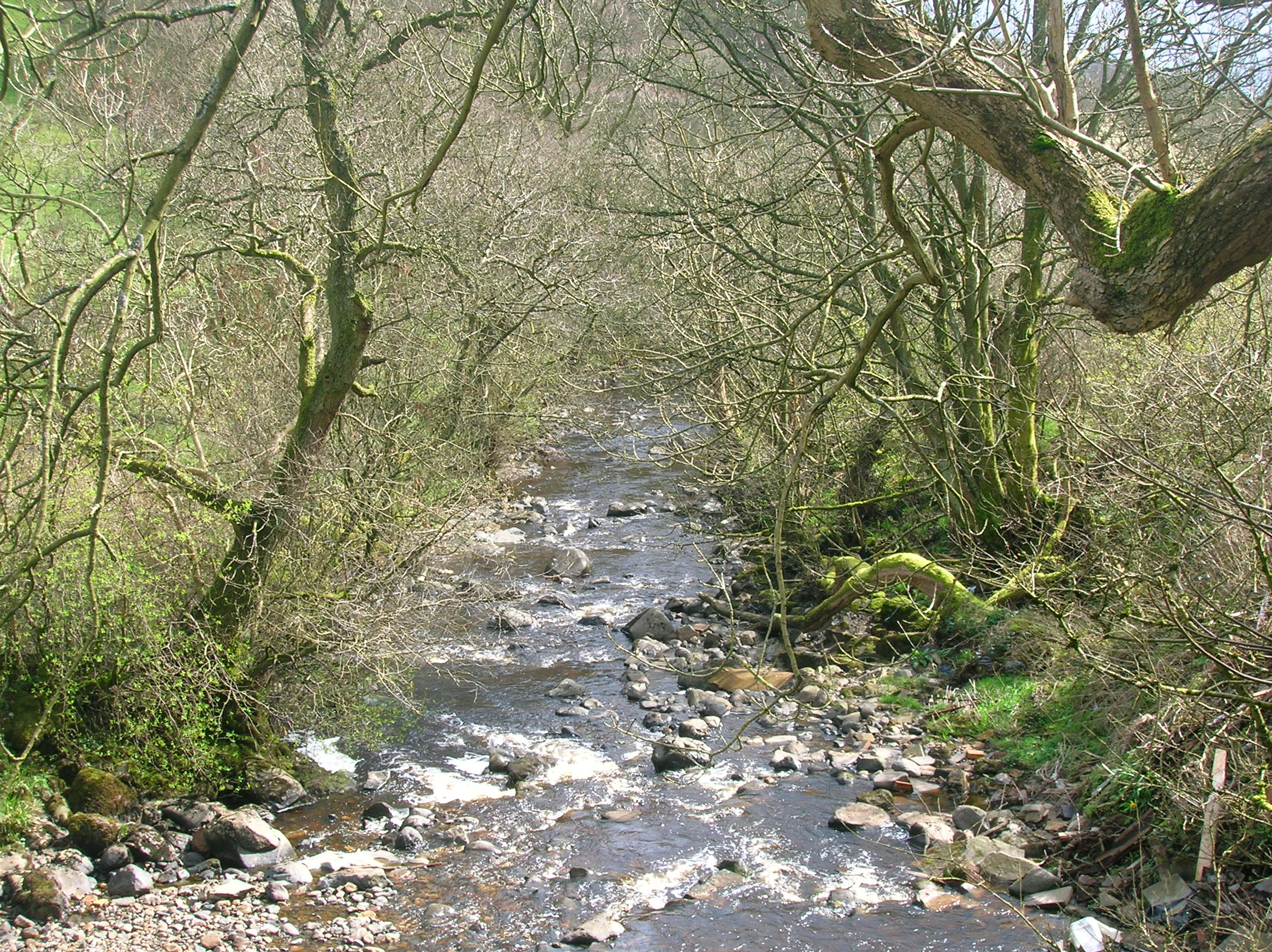
A view of the Glen Water at Law Bridge in Darvel

The modern town of Darvel is said to have been established in the late 18th century. The name Darvel was recorded in old charters as variations of 'Dernvale' or 'Darnevaill' and may derive from an old English word 'derne' which means 'hidden.'

Sir William Wallace, the Scottish freedom fighter, has also been associated with the area. 15th century minstrel Blind Harry wrote in his poem The Wallace that Wallace and his men defeated an English force at the hill in 1296 during the Wars of Scottish Independence. Blind Harry also tells of how the English general, Fenwick, who supposedly killed Wallace's father, was killed during the battle. Maps of the area now name a mound to the east of Loudoun Hill as 'Wallace's Grave'. A battle between Robert the Bruce and the English was also fought there on 10 May 1307.

The land on which Darvel was built was owned by Earls of Loudoun and it was John Campbell, 4th Earl of Loudoun who began the modern town in 1754 as an income for the estate. By 1780, the population had increased to over 400. Loch Gate or Gait was once a significant loch close to the farm of that name, however it was largely drained for agriculture in the 19th century.

=== Darvel Lace ===
In 1876 lace making was introduced to the Irvine Valley by Alexander Morton, and mills began to spring up in Darvel and nearby Newmilns. The valley's products were exported throughout the world, with India providing a particularly large market for lace, muslin and madras. Darvel became known as the "Lace Town" and Darvel Lace was known throughout the world.

Factories in the town also diversified into other textiles, until the late 1970s, when the industry struggled to compete with textiles manufactured in India, China and other Far East countries. The decline was swift. By the end of the 20th century, almost all the factories had closed. Many stood empty for some years, but almost all have now been demolished to make way for housing estates.

The last lace factory in Darvel has now closed. The looms were moved to Newmilns, which is home to the only remaining lace factory in the area.

== Location ==
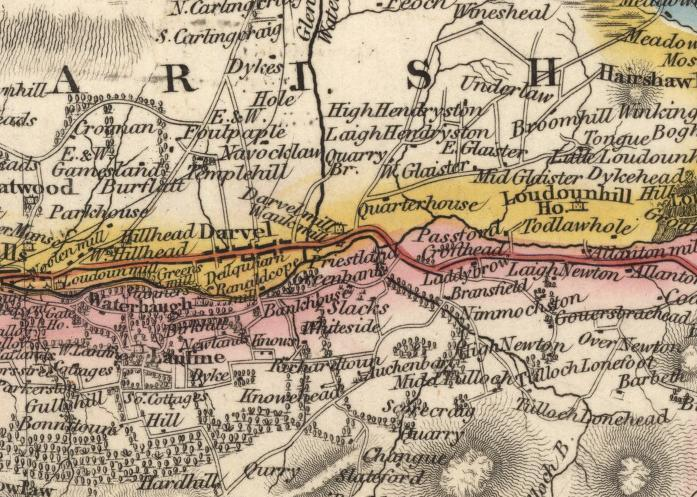
1832 map of Darvel, by John Thomson (1777—1840)

Darvel is situated on the A71 road that runs from Irvine on the west coast to Edinburgh on the east. The town is 9 miles (14 km) east of Kilmarnock and is the most easterly of the Irvine Valley Towns, the others being Galston and Newmilns.

The town was once linked with Stonehouse (via Strathaven) by the Caledonian Railway. However, the line was closed by the LMS before the Second World War. The former Glasgow and South Western Railway branch line to Kilmarnock survived for much longer and was closed in 1964 as part of the Beeching Axe. Much of the route of both lines is still in existence, although the rails have long since gone and many road bridges have been removed. There was a large viaduct to the east of the town, in the lea of Loudoun Hill, which carried the railway line over the valley. This was demolished in 1986, and only the piers remain.

The River Irvine flows along the southern boundary of the town and once powered local mills.

== Climate ==
Darvel has an oceanic climate (Köppen: Cfb). There is a Met Office observation site located at Saughall, 2 1/2 miles (4 km) to the southeast.

Climate data for Saughall (221 m or 725 ft asl, averages 1991–2020)
Month	Jan	Feb	Mar	Apr	May	Jun	Jul	Aug	Sep	Oct	Nov	Dec	Year
Mean daily maximum °C (°F)	5.8 (42.4)	6.4 (43.5)	8.2 (46.8)	11.1 (52.0)	14.3 (57.7)	16.6 (61.9)	18.2 (64.8)	17.9 (64.2)	15.5 (59.9)	11.9 (53.4)	8.4 (47.1)	6.1 (43.0)	11.7 (53.1)
Daily mean °C (°F)	3.1 (37.6)	3.2 (37.8)	4.7 (40.5)	6.9 (44.4)	9.6 (49.3)	12.3 (54.1)	14.0 (57.2)	13.8 (56.8)	11.6 (52.9)	8.4 (47.1)	5.3 (41.5)	3.2 (37.8)	8.0 (46.4)
Mean daily minimum °C (°F)	0.4 (32.7)	0.2 (32.4)	1.2 (34.2)	2.7 (36.9)	4.9 (40.8)	7.9 (46.2)	9.8 (49.6)	9.6 (49.3)	7.8 (46.0)	4.9 (40.8)	2.3 (36.1)	0.2 (32.4)	4.4 (39.9)
Average rainfall mm (inches)	148.5 (5.85)	120.2 (4.73)	109.1 (4.30)	77.1 (3.04)	78.8 (3.10)	86.7 (3.41)	108.4 (4.27)	117.2 (4.61)	113.0 (4.45)	148.7 (5.85)	147.4 (5.80)	158.1 (6.22)	1,413.1 (55.63)
Average rainy days (≥ 1 mm)	18.3	15.8	14.3	13.1	12.7	13.2	14.7	15.6	14.9	17.3	17.3	17.9	185.1
Mean monthly sunshine hours	38.2	65.3	103.1	147.9	196.5	164.5	158.9	155.0	117.0	83.4	54.3	38.7	1,322.7
Source: Met Office

== Notable buildings ==
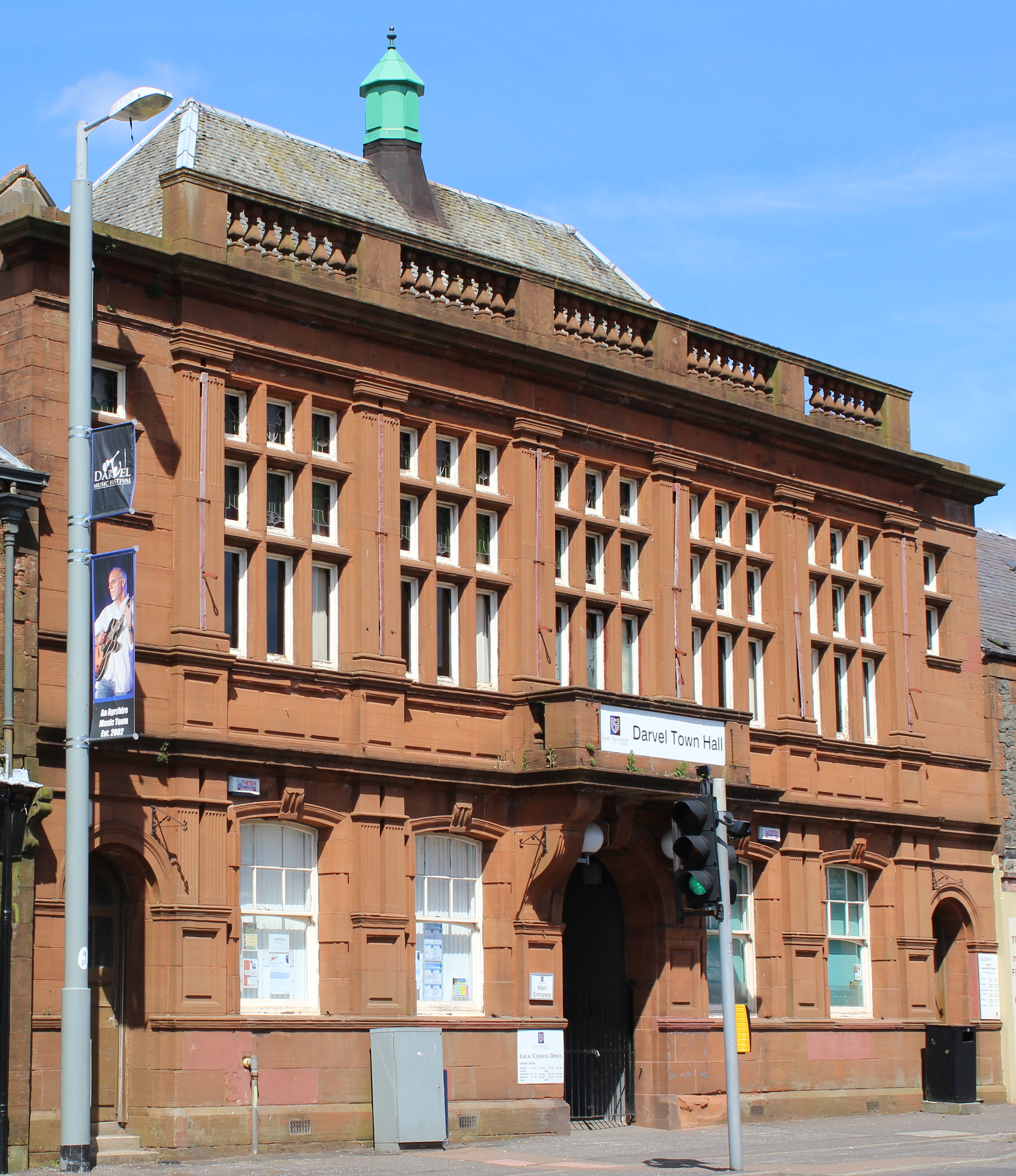
Darvel Town Hall

Darvel Town Hall was designed by Thomas Henry Smith and completed in around 1905. Darvel Telephone Museum is run by retired engineer Max Flemmich.

=== Monuments ===
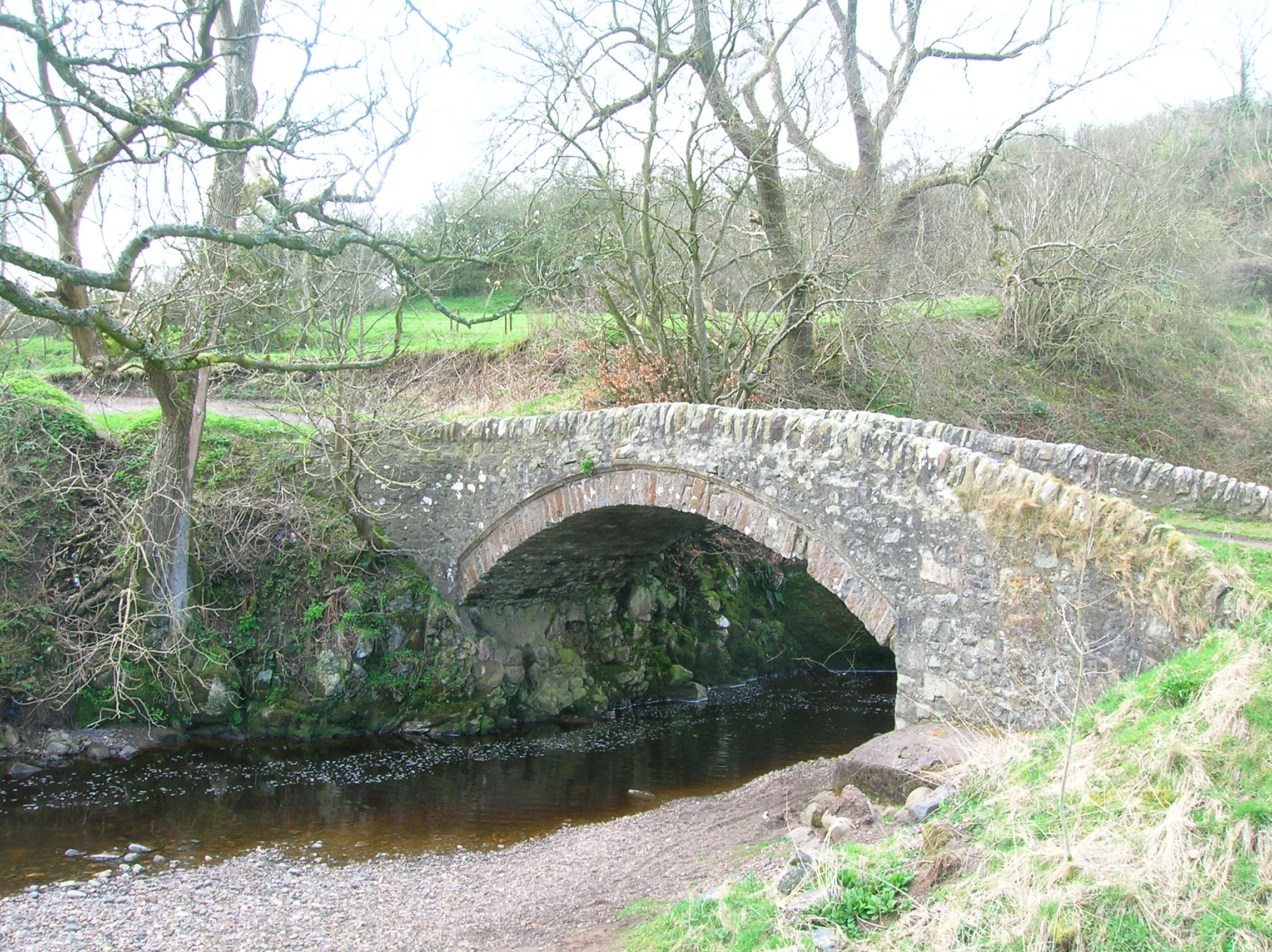
The Law Bridge over the Glen Water near Darvel, 2007

War Memorial
The Darvel War Memorial is situated in Hastings Square in the centre of the town. It is a light grey granite obelisk with a square base. The East side is plain apart from 1914 to 1918 incised on the base. The west side is similar but with 1939-45 incised on the base. The north side has a carved cross at the highest point with a bronze relief laurel wreath immediately below. Towards the base of the obelisk are the words:

To the memory of
Those who gave themselves
A living sacrifice

Then there are 5 columns of names in relief on a bronze plaque and, on the south side, names are etched into the stone in two columns.

Alexander Fleming
A memorial at Lochfield farm commemorates the birth there, on 6 August 1881, of Alexander Fleming, discoverer of penicillin. It was erected in 1957 and regilded in 2008 by its current owners Philip and Heather Scott. The restored memorial was unveiled by Fleming's biographer Kevin Brown in the presence of Provost Stephanie Young. Another memorial with a bust by E.R. Bevan and a garden is situated in Hastings Square.
SAS Memorial
There is a memorial to honour the men and officers of the 1st Special Air Service (SAS) Regiment who, under the command of Lt. Col. Robert Blair Mayne, were stationed in Darvel during the early part of 1944. The memorial – located towards the bottom of Burn Road, takes the form of a stone cairn with a black granite plaque bearing the inscription:

Dedicated to
the men and officers of The 1st Special Air Service Regiment
Stationed at Darvel 1944
Commanding officer
Lt. Col. R. B. Mayne DSO (3 bars)
Légion d'honneur Croix De Guerre
COL. PADDY

The memorial was unveiled by Provost Jimmy Boyd on 2 November 2001. Members of the SAS were at the Town Green to see the unveiling ceremony.

=== The Dagon Stone ===
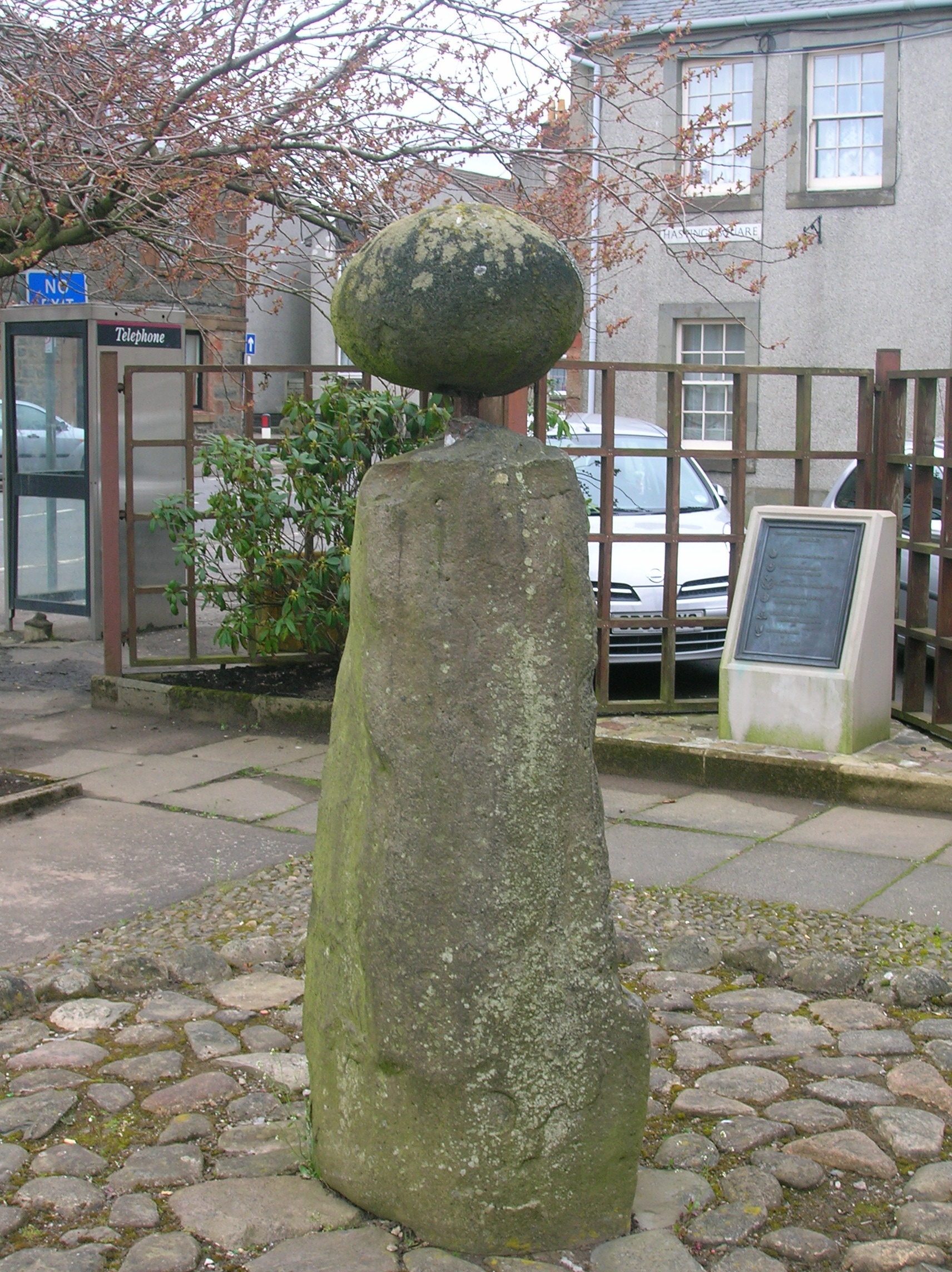
The Dagon stone in Hasting's Square, Darvel, 2007

The RCHAMS website lists this unhewn olivine monolith as a 'possible' standing stone, about 1.6 m (5 ft 3 in) tall. It is rather curious and its general size and shape suggest a prehistoric standing stone. It has twelve small connected depressions spread over three of its sides, interpreted by some as simple 'scratch' marks, alternatively these have been said to link the stone to astronomical observations and to the noon-day sun height at mid-summer. This would link the stone to life-giving powers, fertility and prosperity. Woodburn casually dismisses it as a stone of no special significance.

In 1821, William Morton, a local blacksmith attached a round sandstone ball to the top of it with an iron bar, the large round stone having been found when locals were digging a curling pond. The date 1821 is cut into the iron and this method of fixing became necessary after person or persons unknown had taken it from the top of the Dagon Stone and dumped it into a pond that lay to the east of Ranoldcoup Road. In 1873 it was proposed to break it up as it was in the way of the traffic on the road; however, San Mair, a local farmer, obtained permission to take it to one of his fields where it served as a rubbing stone for the cattle, indicating that it had little local significance at the time.

Although its original location is uncertain, John Woodburn's A History of Darvel (published 1967) noted that the Dagon Stone has stood in at least four different places in the town since the 19th century. The reason for each relocation is unknown, but the stone has been a fixture within Darvel for at least 200 years.

The Dagon Stone was initially recorded in 1752 as being located on East Main Street, at the junction with Ranoldcoup Road, where it is shown on 19th century maps. It may have been a fallen standing stone that was re-erected following road improvements at the time. The main road was widened in 1894, so the stone was moved to the 'grounds of Brown's Institute' upon the suggestion of Miss Martha Brown of Lanfine, located at the corner of Ranoldcoup Road and Mair's Road, and adjacent to Morton Park. In 1938 it was re-sited in the small park in Burn Road at the junction with West Main Street, near the spot where the SAS Memorial now stands. Finally, the stone was moved to its current location in Hastings Square in 1961 or 1962.

Documentation shows that prior to the 19th century, newlywed couples and their wedding parties marched around it for good luck, accompanied by a fiddler. Wedding processions also used to walk three times sunwise round the Dagon stone on the way to the bride's house.

The annual parade or "Prawd", originally held on old New Year's Day, headed by the village band used to walk sunwise round the Dagon stone as a mark of superstitious respect.

Dagon is also the name of a Philistine god, who was half-man half-fish. But with a Scottish accent it no doubt derives from something much closer to home (assuming it is not just the romantic invention of a Victorian antiquary); 'dogon' is a Scots term for a worthless person, a villain and this could by association have been one of the sanctuary stones associated with the church. It is reminiscent of the Clackmannan stone or Stone of Mannau in Clackmannanshire.

== Culture ==
A Gala Day is held every two years. This begins with a parade through the town centre which ends at Morton Park, where the main event takes place.

The Darvel Music Festival takes place each year in the town. It has grown into a popular event, and is hosted in venues around the village including Darvel Town Hall.

== Sport ==
A speedway training track was built by local farmers (the Craig Brothers) on a coal bing (colliery spoil heap) near to the town in the early 1980s. A team representing Darvel raced in the Scottish Junior League with fixtures staged at Blantyre, Edinburgh and Berwick.

There are two local football teams. Darvel F.C., a junior (semi-professional) team, based at Recreation Park, play in the West of Scotland Football League. Darvel Victoria, the local amateur team, play their games at the Gavin Hamilton Sports Centre.

Darvel provided one of the Scottish Cup's biggest upsets on the 23 January 2023 by beating Scottish Premiership club Aberdeen 1–0 in the fourth round.

== Notable people ==
- Sir Alexander Fleming, discoverer of penicillin was born at Lochfield farm
- Christine Borland, artist
- John Morton Boyd, zoologist
- Sammy Cox, footballer, Rangers F.C. and Scotland
- Gordon Cree, musician and entertainer, was born in Darvel and still resides there.
- Allan Gilliland, Scottish-Canadian composer was born in Darvel.
- Sir James Morton creator of light-fast dye
- Craig Samson, footballer, Kilmarnock F.C.
- Alex Smith, footballer, Rangers F.C. and Scotland
- Nicol Smith, footballer, Rangers F.C. and Scotland
- Tom Wylie, footballer, Queen of the South F.C. and Blackburn Rovers
- William Sheret, Showjumper
- Ian Donald Cochrane Hopkins, comedy writer

== See also ==
- List of places in East Ayrshire
