= Cattle rubbing stone =

Stone for cattle to rub their skin

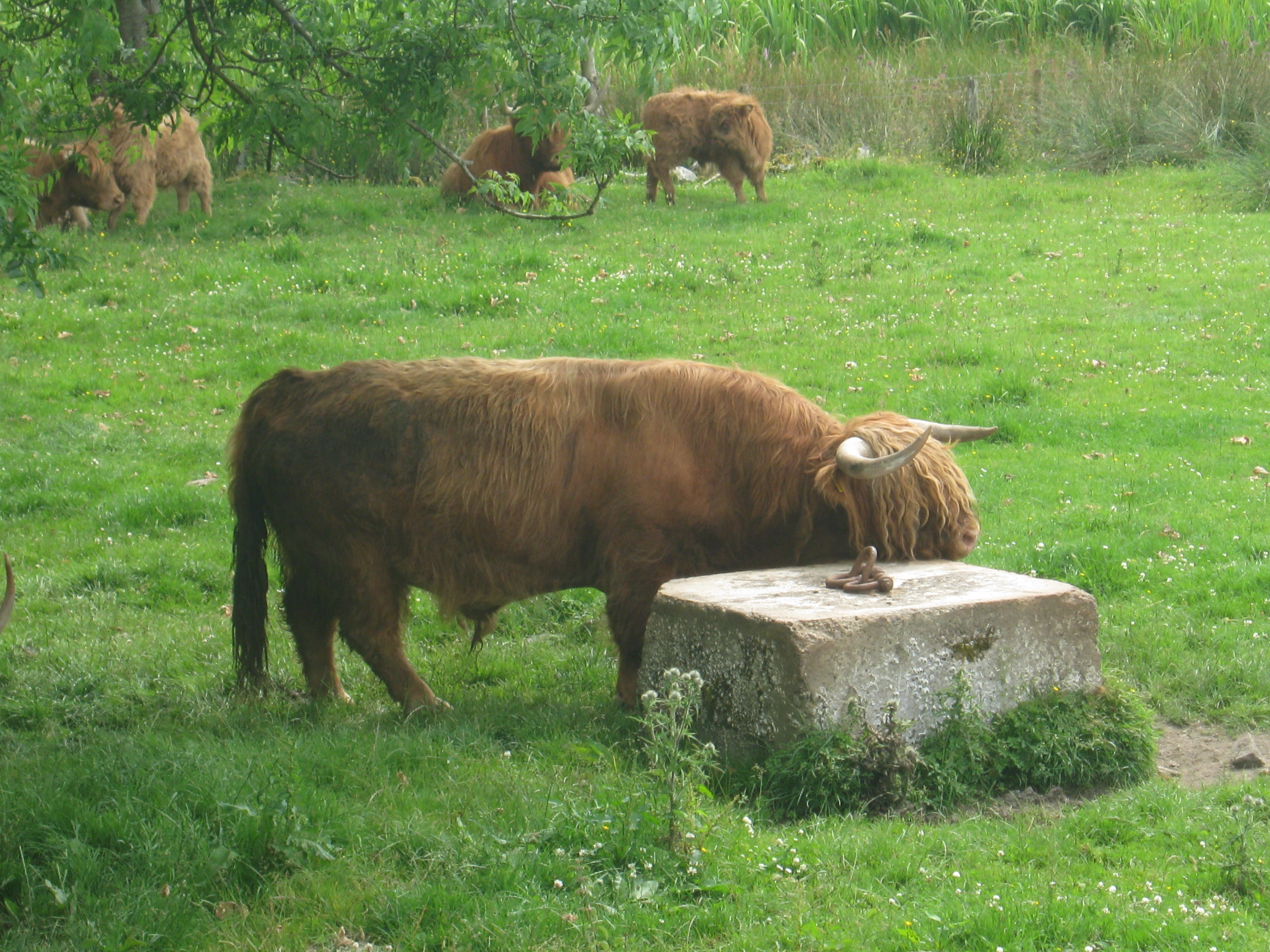
A Highland cow rubbing its head on a piece of stone in a pasture

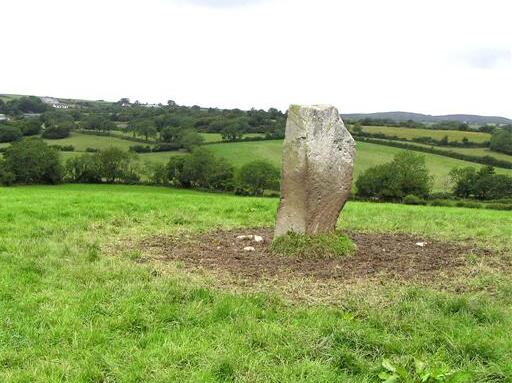
Rubbing stone showing churned up soil and lack of vegetation caused by the cattle, with a visible polished effect

A cattle rubbing stone (or clawin post in Scots) is a stone allowing cattle to rub their skin without causing damage to field infrastructure such as fences and posts, or natural features such as trees. They were once a common sight in pastures in Britain, but many have since been removed to accommodate the needs of modern farming practices. Cattle are depicted on Pictish stones such as the Fowlis Wester stone; however, the requirement for rubbing stones mainly relates to the enclosure of fields in the late 18th century that held cattle within a confined area.

A claw-scrunt in Scots is a tree or tree stump used by cattle to rub themselves against.

== Structure ==
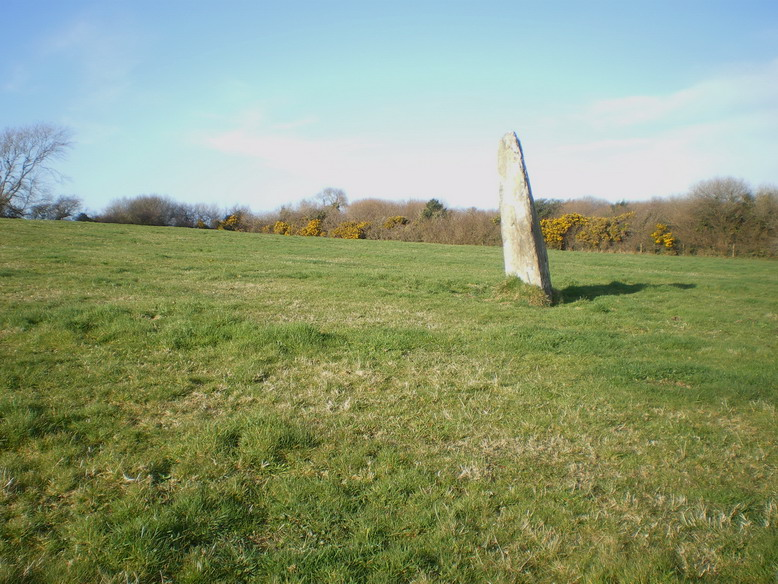
A standing stone used a cattle rubbing stone

Cattle rubbing stones need to be well dug into the ground and/or packed with stones, and have to be made of hard stone types that can withstand the considerable weight and strength of cattle. They can often be distinguished from megaliths such as standing stones by having angular edges showing that they have been cleaved during quarrying rather than be glacial erratics or from other natural sources. Some stones may show drill marks from the quarrying process. The shape is based on the need for appropriate height and strength without occupying too much space.

The use of Ordnance Survey maps from different years may show that the stones were installed by farmers and they may be marked as 'rubbing stones'.

=== Identification ===
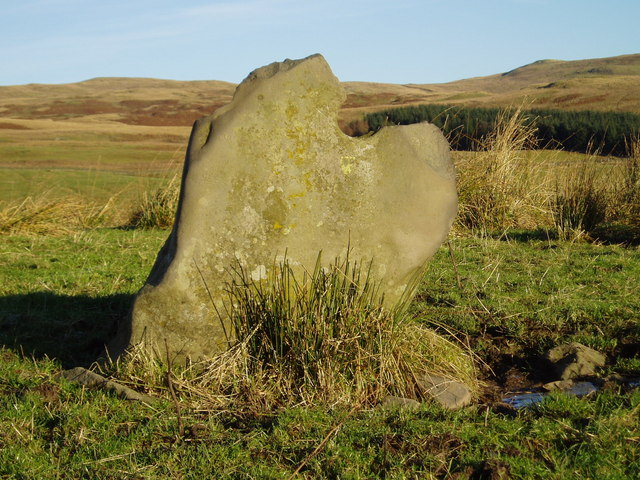
A holed stone probably damaged by cattle using it as a rubbing stone. The polishing action caused by cattle rubbing is clearly visible.

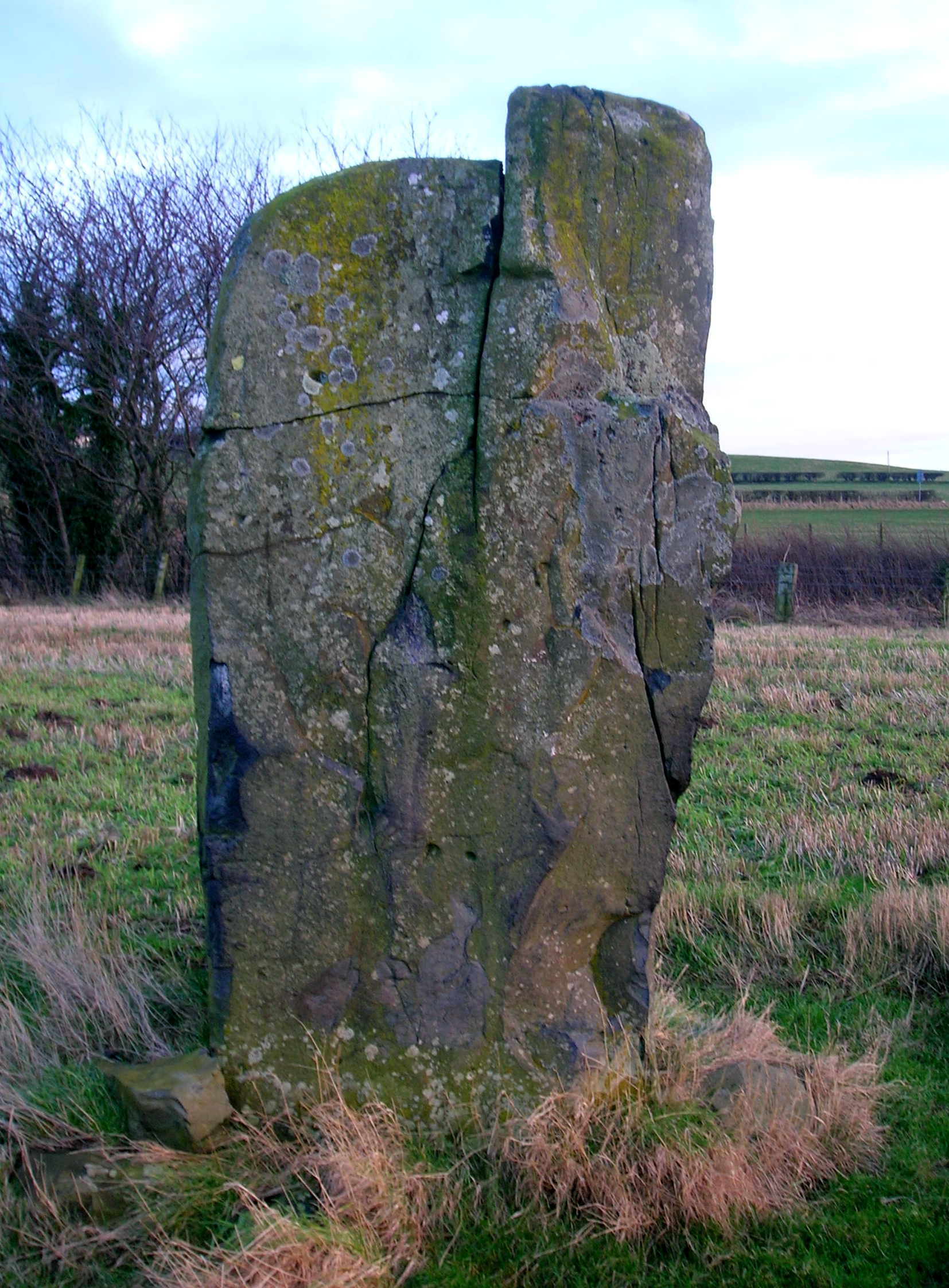
The Drybridge standing stone is not made from a suitable stone to have been installed as a rubbing stone

In Scotland the word yokey was generally used for cattle that had itchy skin. Cattle rubbing stones were often made from harder stone such as whinstone or granite depending on the geology of the area concerned. An indicator that a stone is used by cattle for alleviating skin irritation is the polished appearance of the areas that have been used by many generations of cattle over the years. The ground around rubbing stones is often churned up and devoid of vegetation. Stones may also have areas of staining caused by the transfer of oil from the hide of the cattle during the rubbing process.

Some standing stones owe their survival partly due to their practical functionality as cattle rubbing stones although some megalithic sites have had to be protected from the damage that cattle can and do cause as indicated by the attached photograph. The proximity to known megalithic sites is also a clue as to the actual origins of rubbing stones.

Stones with ancient carvings on them such as cup and rings, petrosomatoglyphs, Pictish, early Christian, Ogham, etc. indicate their origins even if they have a rubbing stone function.

The Dagon Stone at Darvel in East Ayrshire was once used as a cattle rubbing stone.
