= Christiane Sadlo =

German screenwriter and journalist

Christiane Sadlo (born 25 January 1954) is a German screenwriter, dramaturge, and journalist. She is best known by her pseudonym Inga Lindström. She was married to sculptor Karl Halt Trossbach until his death in 2018. The couple had a daughter.

== Works ==
=== TV films and series ===
- Schloss Hohenstein, 13 episodes, ARD 1991–94
- Der Bergdoktor, 12 episodes and two 90 min specials, Sat.1 1991–94
- Forsthaus Falkenau, 5. season, 2 episodes, ZDF 1994
- Wo das Herz zu Hause ist, Sat.1 1993
- Die Unzertrennlichen, TV series, TV pilot, 13 episodes, Sat.1 1996/97
- Die Geliebte, TV series, episode Das Abschiedsgeschenk, ZDF, April 1998
- Hurenmord – ein Pfarrer schweigt, Co-Author with Herrmann Kirchmann, Krimi, Sat.1 September 1998
- Lisa Falk, TV series, episode Tod des Professors, ZDF, September 1998
- Sommergewitter, ZDF, December 1998
- Wie stark muss eine Liebe sein, ZDF, December 1998
- Ich bin kein Mörder, ZDF 1999
- Die weißen Vögel, ZDF 1999
- Das Geheimnis des Rosengartens, ARD 1999
- Das Herz des Priesters (two parts), ZDF 1999
- Am Ende siegt die Liebe, ARD 1999
- Herzstolpern, 2001
- Rosamunde Pilcher: Wind über dem Fluss (Screenplay), 2001
- Das Geheimnis der Mittsommernacht, 2001
- Liebe unter weißen Segeln, 2001
- Zugvögel der Liebe, 2001
- Rosamunde Pilcher: Küste der Träume (Screenplay), 2001
- Die Braut meines Freundes, 2001
- Ein Geschenk der Liebe, 2001
- Stimme des Herzens, 2000
- Am Ende siegt die Liebe, 2000
- Das Herz des Priesters, 2000
- Der Zauber des Rosengartens, 2000
- Rosamunde Pilcher: Ruf der Vergangenheit (Screenplay), 2000
- Liebe, Lügen, Leidenschaft, 2002
- Die Zeit mit dir, 2002
- Rosamunde Pilcher: Mit den Augen der Liebe, 2002
- Rosamunde Pilcher: Flamme der Liebe, Screenplay, 2003
- Rosamunde Pilcher: Federn im Wind, Screenplay, 2004
- Die Kinder meiner Braut, 2004
- Utta Danella: Das Familiengeheimnis (Screenplay), 2004
- Familie Dr. Kleist, TV series, since 2004
- Rosamunde Pilcher: Vermächtnis der Liebe (Screenplay), 2005
- Brief eines Unbekannten, 2005
- Eine Liebe am Gardasee, 2006
- Hilfe, meine Tochter heiratet, 2006
- Die Gipfelstürmerin, 2007
- Wiedersehen in Verona, 2007
- Barbara Wood: Karibisches Geheimnis (Screenplay), 2009
- Sisi – Italien (Screenplay), 2009
- Wilde Wellen, TV miniseries 2011
