= Hubert ohne Staller =

2011 German television series

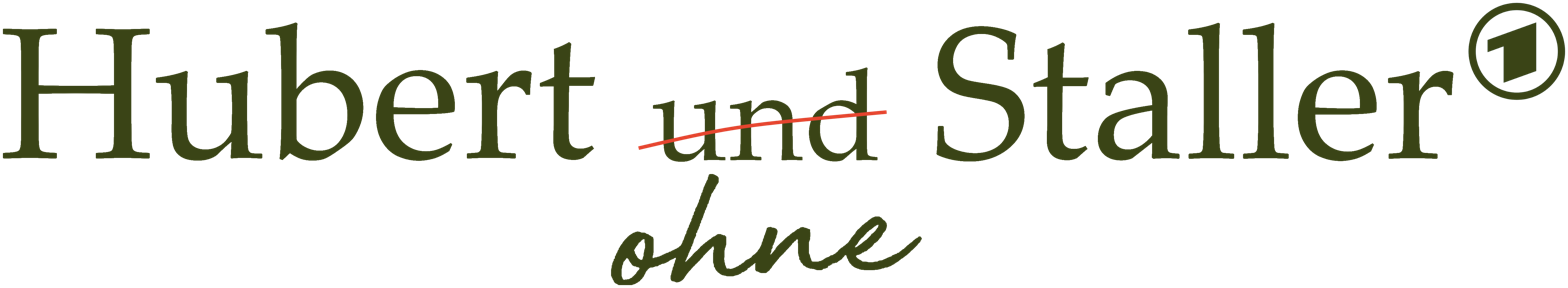
- Also known as: Hubert und Staller
- Composer: Gerd Ekken Gerdes
- Country of origin: Germany
- Original language: German
- No. of seasons: 12+

Production
- Production company: Tele München Group

Original release
- Release: 2011

Hubert ohne Staller (Hubert und Staller before season 7) is a German TV series.

== Premise ==
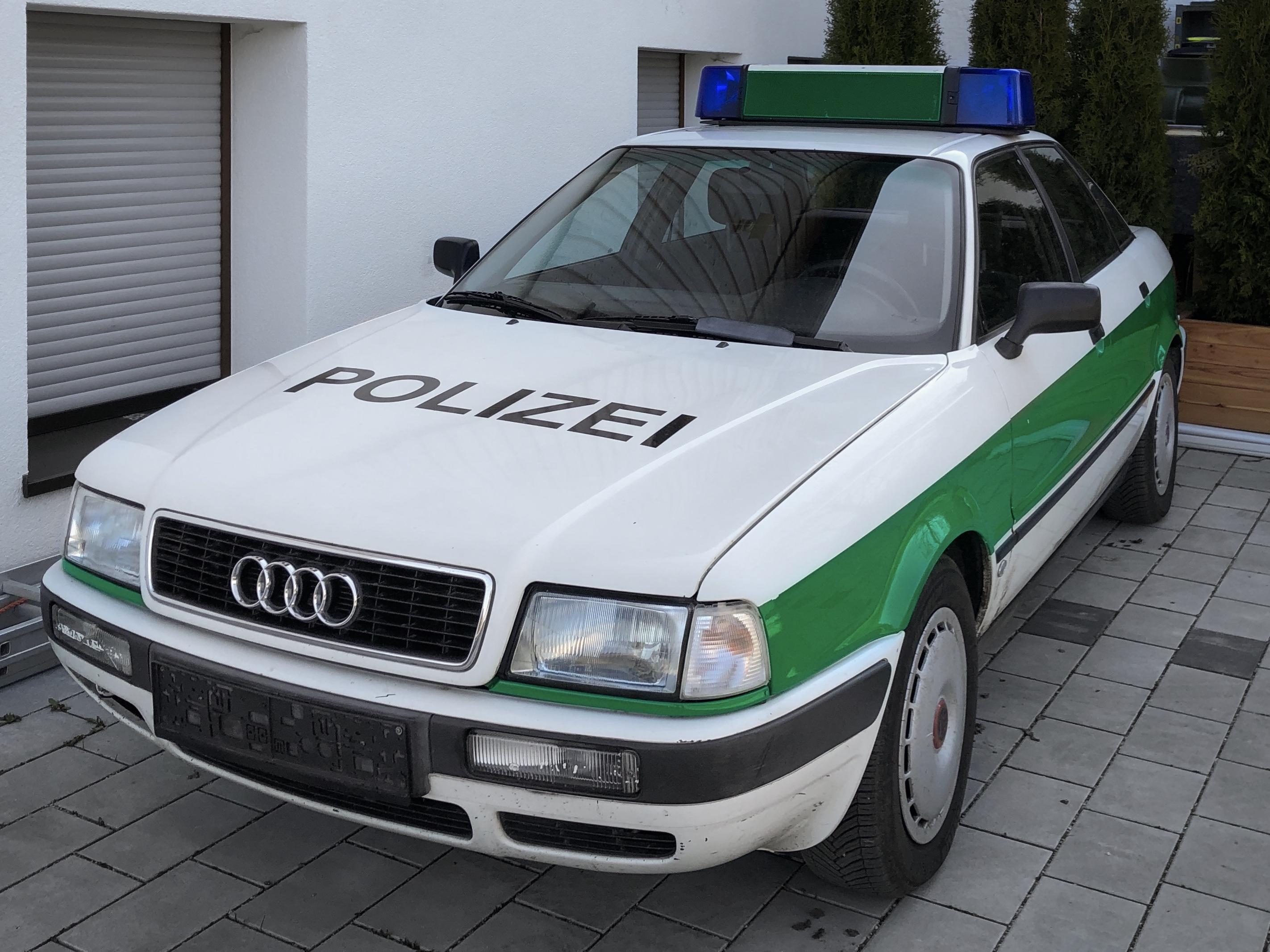
Wagen 3 from the series

The focus of the series is the small police station in the upper Bavarian Wolfratshausen. Its relatives regularly get involved in criminal cases (mostly homicides) in the city and its rural environment, which actually go far beyond their competences. Nevertheless, they manage to get to the trand of the perpetrators, whereby the creatively planned investigations that do not always fully comply with the regulations are often accompanied by mishaps. The district has only a single, older patrol car of the type Audi 80 B4 with the caller sign Wagen 3.

== Cast ==
This is the current cast of Hubert ohne Staller.

Actor	Role
Christian Tramitz	Franz Hubert
Michael Brandner	Reimund Girwidz
Katharina Müller-Elmau	Susanne Kaiser
Mitsou Jung	Christina Bayer
Paul Sedlmeir	Martin Riedl
Susu Padotzke	Dr. Caroline Fuchs
Hannes Ringlstetter	Yazid

Former cast members:

Actor	Role	from	to
Helmfried von Lüttichau	Johannes Staller	1.01	7.16
Monika Gruber	Barbara Hansen	1.01, 6.0?	2.??, 9.0?
Annett Fleischer	Sonja Wirth	1.01	6.16
Klara Deutschmann	Lena Winter	7.01	8.01
Jeanne Goursaud	Rebecca Jungblut	8.01	8.16
Carin C. Tietze	Sabrina Rattlinger	1.01	6.??
Karin Thaler	Dr. Anja Licht	1.01	7.04
