= Forsthaus Falkenau =

- Starring: Christian Wolff; Hardy Krüger Jr. Bruni Löbel
- Country of origin: Germany

Forsthaus Falkenau is a German television series.

== Casts ==
- Christian Wolff: Martin Rombach
- Hardy Krüger Jr.: Stefan Leitner
- Bruni Löbel: Herta Stolze verh. Bieler
- Walter Buschhoff: Vinzenz Bieler
- Michael Wolf: Markus Rombach
- Katharina Köhntopp: Andrea Rombach verh. Arnhoff
- Nicole Schmid: Ricarda „Rica“ Rombach
- Nikolai Bury: Peter Rombach geb. Bellinghaus
- Julia Grimpe: Anna Hansen verh. Rombach
- Sascha Hornig/Dennis Hornig: Florian Rombach
- Cheyenne Pahde/Valentina Pahde: Katharina Arnhoff
- Anja Kruse: Dr. Angelika Grassmann verh. Rombach
- Nora von Collande: Dr. Susanna Mangold verh. Rombach
- Anja Schüte: Sophie von Haunstein
- Tina Bordihn: Sonja Schwanthaler
- Gisa Zach: Dr. Marie Stadler
- Maxi Warwel: Daniela Königstein
- Martin Lüttge: Wolfgang Leitner
- Veronika Fitz: Marianne Rainders
- Günther Schramm: Josef Neureuther
- Teresa Klamert: Jenny Leitner
- Lion Sokar: Daniel Schwanthaler
- Paulina Schwab: Lisa Schwanthaler
- Manou Lubowski: Peter Kögl

== See also ==
- List of German television series
