= Die Rosenheim-Cops =

German television series

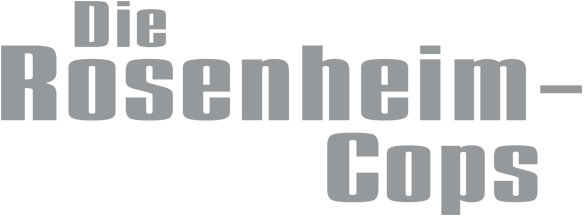
- Genre: Crime, comedy
- Country of origin: Germany
- No. of seasons: 23
- No. of episodes: 538 and 5 Specials

Production
- Running time: 2002-present
- Production company: Bavaria Film

Original release
- Network: ZDF
- Release: 9 January 2002

Die Rosenheim-Cops is a German television series set in Chiemgau, mainly in Rosenheim. It is produced by the Bavaria Film GmbH for the ZDF public TV network.

The cost per episode is estimated at 425,000 euros.

== Cast ==
This is the actual cast of Die Rosenheim-Cops.

Actor	Role
Dieter Fischer	Anton Stadler
Igor Jeftić	Sven Hansen
Max Müller	Michi Mohr
Marisa Burger	Miriam Stockl
Karin Thaler	Marie Hofer
Baran Hevi	Kilian Kaya
Paul Brusa	Daniel Donato
Alexander Duda	Gert Achtziger

== Concept ==
The series' main overall focus lies on the contrasting personalities of a rustic Upper Bavarian small town inspector and his frequently replaced city slicker colleague, who has usually been transferred to the town for mostly incomprehensible reasons. Despite all differences, the new colleague is always warmly received and quickly integrated into the team.

The small town inspector Korbinian Hofer was played by Joseph Hannesschläger, who died in January 2020.

Each episode usually starts with the discovery of a body. This is communicated to the investigators by the secretary Mrs. Stockl with the words "Es gabat a Leich!" (Bavarian dialect for "There is a dead body").

Due to the show's lighthearted nature, it is customary for episodes to feature a comedic side plot, which runs parallel to the central storyline and is usually resolved right after the main plot's conclusion. These side stories are almost always in no way connected to the murder investigation the main story commonly consists of and may feature any kind of potentially humorous scenario, from an unexpected lottery win to more general events like comedic occurrences at the police office or on a farm. This kind of general writing scheme is exceedingly characteristic for early-evening crime shows on German public television.

Participating actors and actresses include: Marlene Morreis.

== See also ==
- List of German television series
