= Weißblaue Geschichten =

- Starring: Gustl Bayrhammer
- Country of origin: Germany

Original release
- Network: ZDF
- Release: 20 December 1983

Weißblaue Geschichten is a German television series.

== See also ==
- List of German television series
