= List of police television dramas =

This is a list of police television programs. (CBDC noted, cancellations)

Dramas involving police procedural work, and private detectives, secret agents, and the justice system have been a mainstay of broadcast television since the early days of broadcasting. Shows that are not dramatic programming are indicated (e.g. reality television, comedy or comedy drama).

The film genre related to police television show (law enforcement, rescue, and military dramas) are reality television workplace television series (list).

== # ==
- 07 zgłoś się (Poland, 1976–1987)
- 100 Code (Sweden, 2015)
- 10-8: Officers on Duty (US, 2003–2004)
- 1448 (reality; Faroe Islands, 2009–2012)
- 19-2 (Canada, 2011–2015)
- 19-2 (Canada, 2014–2017)
- 21 Jump Street (US, 1987–1991)
- 24 (US, 2001–2014)
  - 24: Legacy (US, 2017)
- 24 Hours in Police Custody (reality; UK, 2014–present)
- 240-Robert (US, 1979–1981)
- 48 Hours (documentary; US, 1988–present)
- 77 Sunset Strip (US, 1958–1964)
- 9-1-1 (US, 2018–present)
  - 9-1-1: Lone Star (US, 2020–2025)
  - 9-1-1: Nashville (US, 2025- present)

== A ==
- The Academy (HK, 2005–2009)
- The Academy (reality; US, 2007–2008)
- A Case for Annika Bengtzon (Sweden, 2012)
- Acceptable Risk (Ireland, 2017)
- Adam-12 (US, 1968–1975)
- The Adventures of Sherlock Holmes (UK, 1984–1994)
- The Agatha Christie Hour (UK, 1982)
- Agatha Christie's Partners in Crime (UK, 1983–1984)
- Agatha Christie's Poirot (UK, 1989–2013)
- AIBOU: Tokyo Detective Duo (Japan, 2003–present)
- Alarm für Cobra 11 – Die Autobahnpolizei (Germany, 1996–present)
- Alaska State Troopers (reality; US, 2009–2015)
- Almost Human (US, 2013–2014)
- Der Alte (Germany, 1976–present)
- The Amazing Mr. Malone (US, 1951–1952)
- America's Most Wanted (reality; US, 1988–2012 & 2021)
- Amy Prentiss (US, 1974–1975)
- Andhera Ujala (Pakistan, 1984–1985)
- Andy Barker P.I. (comedy; US, 2007)
- The Andy Griffith Show (comedy; US, 1960–1968)
- Ang Probinsyano (Philippines, 2015–2022)
- Angel Street (US, 1992)
- Angela's Eyes (US, 2006)
- Angels of Mission (HK, 2004)
- Anna Lee (UK, 1993–1994)
- Anna Pihl (Denmark, 2006–2008)
- Arctic Circle (Finland/Germany, 2018)
- Armed Reaction (HK, 1998–2004)
- Ashes to Ashes (UK, 2008–2010)
- Aso ni San Roque (Philippines, 2012–2013)
- Astrid et Raphaëlle (France/Belgium, 2019–present)
- Automan (comedy; US, 1983–1984)
- The Avengers (UK, 1961–1969)
- Awake (US, 2012)
- Alien Nation (US, 1989)

== B ==
- B. J. and the Bear (US, 1979–1981)
- Baantjer (The Netherlands, 1995–2006)
- Backstrom (US, 2015)
- Backup (UK, 1995–1997)
- Bakersfield P.D. (US, 1993–1994)
- Banacek (US, 1972–1974)
- Banyon (US, 1972–1973)
- Barcelona Crime (Spain/Germany, 2013)
- Baretta (US, 1975–1978)
- Barlow at Large/Barlow (UK, 1971–1975)
- Barnaby Jones (US, 1973–1980)
- Barney Miller (comedy; US, 1975–1982)
- Battle Creek (comedy; US, 2015)
- The Bay (UK, 2019–present)
- Baywatch Nights (sci-fi; US, 1995–1997)
- The Beat (US, 2000)
- Beauty & the Beast (Canada/US, 2012–2016)
- Beck (Sweden, 1997–present)
- The Beiderbecke Tapes (UK, 1987)
- Bella da morire (Italy, 2020)
- Bellamy (Australia, 1981)
- Bergerac (UK, 1981–1991)
- Between the Lines (UK, 1992–1994)
- Beverly Hills Buntz (US, 1987–1988)
- Big Apple (US, 2001)
- The Bill (UK, 1983–2010)
- Bite Club (Australia, 2018)
- Black Spot (France/Belgium, 2017–2019)
- BlackJack (Australia, 2003–2007)
- Blind Justice (US, 2005)
- Blindspot (US, 2015–2020)
- Bloodlines (UK, 2005)
- Blue Bloods (US, 2010–2024)
- Blue Heelers (Australia, 1994–2006)
- The Blue Knight (US, 1975)
- Blue Lights (UK, 2023–present)
- Blue Murder (Australia, 1995)
- Blue Murder: Killer Cop (Australia, 2017)
- Blue Murder (Canada, 2001–2004)
- Blue Murder (UK, 2003–2009)
- The Body Farm (UK, 2011)
- Body of Proof (US, 2011–2013)
- Bones (US, 2005–2017)
  - The Finder (US, 2012)
- Booker (US, 1989–1990)
- Boomtown (US, 2002–2003)
- Boon (UK, 1986–1992 & 1995)
- The Border (Canada, 2008–2010)
- Border Security: Australia's Front Line (reality; Australia, 2004–present)
- Borderliner (Norway, 2017)
- Bordertown (Finland, 2016–2020)
- Bosch (US, 2014–2021)
- Bosch: Legacy (US, 2022–2025)
- Boston Blackie (US, 1951–1953)
- Bourbon Street Beat (US, 1959–1960)
- The Break (Belgium, 2016)
- The Bridge (Canada, 2010)
- The Bridge (Denmark/Sweden, 2011–2018)
- The Bridge (US, 2013–2014)
- The Bridge (Russia, 2018–2020)
- The Bridge (Malaysia/Singapore, 2018–2020)
- Brimstone (US, 1998–1999)
- Broadchurch (UK, 2013–2017)
- The Brokenwood Mysteries (New Zealand, 2014–present)
- Broders (Peru, 2009)
- Brooklyn Nine-Nine (comedy; US, 2013–2021)
- Brooklyn South (US, 1997–1998)
- The Brothers Brannagan (US, 1960–1961)
- Buddy Faro (US, 1998)
- Der Bulle von Tölz (Germany, 1996–2009)
- Bulman (UK, 1985–1987)
- Burke's Law (US, 1963–1965)
- Burke's Law (US, 1994–1995)
- Burn Notice (US, 2007–2013)

== C ==
- Cadfael (UK, 1994–1998)
- Cagney & Lacey (US, 1982–1988)
- Callan (UK, 1967–1972)
- Campion (UK, 1989–1990)
- Candice Renoir (France, 2013)
- Cannon (US, 1971–1976)
- Il capitano Maria (Italy, 2017–2018)
- Car 54, Where Are You? (comedy; US, 1961–1963)
- Cardinal (Canada, 2017–2020)
- Carlo & Malik (Italy, 2018)
- Caronte (Spain, 2020)
- Castle (comedy drama; US, 2009–2016)
- C.A.T.S. Eyes (UK, 1985–1987)
- Četnické humoresky (Czech Republic, 1997–2007)
- The Champions (UK, 1968–1969)
- CHAOS (US, 2011–2011)
- Charlie Wild, Private Detective (US, 1950–1952)
- Charlie's Angels (US, 1976–1981)
- Chase (US, 1973–1974)
- Chase (US, 2010–2011)
- La Chica de Ayer (Spain, 2009)
- The Chicago Code (US, 2010–2011)
- Chicago P.D. (US, 2014–present)
- The Chinese Detective (UK, 1981–1982)
- CHiPs (US, 1977–1983)
- Chopper One (US, 1974)
- C.I.B. Files (HK, 2006)
- Cidade Alerta (Brazil, 1995)
- C.I.D. (India, 1998–2018)
- C.I.D. Special Bureau (India, 2004–2006)
- C.I.D. Kolkata Bureau (India, 2012–2014)
- C.I.F. (India, 2019–present)
- City Homicide (Australia, 2007–2011)
- Clarice (US, 2021)
- Close to Home (US, 2005–2007)
- The Closer (US, 2005–2012)
- Code 37 (Belgium, 2009–2012)
- Cold Case (US, 2003–2010)
- Cold Squad (Canada, 1998–2005)
- Columbo (US, 1968–1978 & 1989–2003)
- The Commander (UK, 2003–2008)
- The Commish (US, 1991–1996)
- Commissaire Dupin (France, 2014)
- Common Law (US, 2012)
- Control - Hanzai Shinri Sousa (Japan, 2011)
- Cool Million (US, 1972)
- Cop Shop (Australia, 1977–1984)
- Coppers (Belgium, 2016)
- COPS (reality; US, 1989–present)
- The Cops (UK, 1998–2000)
- Cops L.A.C. (Australia, 2010)
- Coronado 9 (US, 1960–1961)
- Coroner (Canada, 2019–present)
- The Coroner (UK, 2015–2016)
- The Corridor People (UK, 1966)
- Courage in Red (reality; Canada, 2009)
- Cracked (Canada, 2013)
- Cracker (UK, 1993–1995 & 1996 & 2006)
  - Cracker (US, 1997–1999)
- Crash Investigation Unit (reality; Australia, 2008–2011)
- Crime & Punishment (reality; US, 2002–2004)
- Crime Photographer (US, 1951–1952)
- Crime Story (US, 1986–1988)
- Crime Traveller (sci-fi; UK, 1997)
- Crimes of Passion (Sweden, 2013)
- The Criminal Investigator I and II (HK, 1995–1996)
- Criminal Minds (US/Canada, 2005–2020)
  - Criminal Minds: Suspect Behavior (US, 2011)
  - Criminal Minds: Beyond Borders (US, 2016–2017)
  - Evolution (US, 2022–present)
- Crna hronika (Bosnia and Herzegovina, 2004–2006)
- Cross (crime thriller; US, 2024–present)
- Crossing Jordan (US, 2001–2007)
- CSI: Crime Scene Investigation (US/Canada, 2000–2015)
  - CSI: Miami (US/Canada, 2002–2012)
  - CSI: NY (US/Canada, 2004–2013)
  - CSI: Cyber (US/Canada, 2015–2016)
  - CSI: Vegas (US, 2021–2024)
- Cuffs (UK, 2015)

== D ==
- Da kommt Kalle (Germany, 2006–2011)
- Dalgliesh (UK, 1983–1998 & 2003)
- Dalziel and Pascoe (UK, 1996–2007)
- Dan August (US, 1970–1971)
- Danger Man (UK, 1960–1962 & 1964–1968)
- Dark Blue (US, 2009–2010)
- Dark Justice (US, 1991–1993)
- Dateline NBC (documentary; US, 1992–present)
- David Cassidy: Man Undercover (US, 1978–1979)
- DaVinci's Inquest (Canada, 1998–2005)
- The Dead Zone (US/Canada, 2002–2007)
- Death in Paradise (UK, 2011–present)
- Death Valley (US, 2011)
- The Defenders (US, 1961–1965)
- Dempsey and Makepeace (UK, 1985–1986)
- Derrick (West Germany, 1974–1998)
- The Detail (Canada, 2018)
- Detective Investigation Files (HK, 1995–1999)
- The Detectives Starring Robert Taylor (US, 1959–1962)
- The Detectives (comedy; UK, 1993–1997)
- Detroit 1-8-7 (US, 2010–2011)
- Dexter (US, 2006–2013)
  - Dexter: New Blood (US, 2021)
  - Dexter: Original Sin (US, 2024-2025)
  - Dexter: Resurrection (US, 2025–present)
- Diagnosis: Murder (US, 1993–2001)
- Dick and the Duchess (US, 1957–1958)
- Dick Spanner, P.I. (animated comedy; UK, 1986–1987)
- Dicte (Denmark, 2013–2014)
- D.I.E. (HK, 2008–2009)
- Die Neue – Eine Frau mit Kaliber (Austria, 1998)
- Dirty Money: The Story of the Criminal Assets Bureau (Ireland, 2008)
- Disorderly Conduct: Video on Patrol (reality; US, 2006–2009)
- The District (US, 2000–2004)
- The Division (US, 2001–2004)
- Division 4 (Australia, 1969–1975)
- Dixon of Dock Green (UK, 1955–1976)
- Dobrodružství kriminalistiky (Czechoslovakia/Germany, 1989–1991)
- Doha heroes (reality; Qatar, 2011)
- Don Matteo (Italy, 2000–2020)
- Doubt (US, 2017)
- Dragnet (US, 1951–1959 & 1967–1970 & 1989–1991 & 2003–2004)
- Dublin Murders (UK, 2019)
- Due South (Canada/US, 1994–1999)
- Duggan (New Zealand, 1999)

== E ==
- The Eagle (Denmark, 2004–2006)
- East West 101 (Australia, 2007–2011)
- Echo Four-Two (UK, 1961)
- Ekstradycja (Poland, 1995–1999)
- Elementary (US, 2012–2019)
- Eleventh Hour (UK, 2006)
- Eleventh Hour (US, 2008–2009)
- Ellery Queen (US, 1975–1976)
- Elsbeth (US, 2024-)
- Endeavour (UK, 2012–2023)
- The Enemy Within (US, 2019)
- Der Ermittler (Germany, 2001–2005)
- Eureka (US, 2006–2012)
- Every Move You Make (HK, 2010)
- Eyes (US, 2005)

== F ==
- Fabian of the Yard (UK, 1954–1956)
- Der Fahnder (Germany, 1984–2001)
- Fala Zbrodni (Poland, 2003–2008)
- Falco (France, 2013–2016)
- Falco (Mexico/Columbia/US, 2018)
- The Fall (UK, 2013–2016)
- Ein Fall für zwei (Germany, 1981–2013)
- Fallen Angels (US, 1993–1995)
- Fallen Angels (Australia, 1997)
- Fallet (Sweden, 2017)
- Fast Forward (Austria, 2009)
- Fastlane (US, 2002–2003)
- Father Brown (UK, 1974)
- Father Dowling Mysteries (US, 1987–1991)
- FBI (US, 2018–present)
  - FBI: Most Wanted (US, 2020–2025)
  - FBI: International (US, 2021–2025)
- The F.B.I. (US, 1965–1974)
- The FBI Files (documentary; US, 1998–2006)
- Fidati di me (Italy, 2008)
- The First 48 (US, 2004–present)
- FlashForward (US, 2009–2010)
- Flashpoint (Canada, 2008–2012)
- Flower of Evil (Philippines, 2022)
- Flikken (Belgium, 1999–2009)
- Flikken Maastricht (The Netherlands, 2007–present)
- Follow the Sun (US, 1960–1961)
- The Force (reality; UK, 2009)
- The Force: Behind the Line (reality; Australia, 2005–2020)
- The Force: Manchester (reality; UK, 2015–2016)
- Forensic Files (reality; US, 1996–2011)
- Forensic Heroes (HK, 2006–2019)
- The Forest (France, 2017)
- Forever Knight (Canada, 1989–1996)
- Foyle's War (UK, 2002–2015)
- Fraud Squad (UK, 1969–1970)
- Fraud Squad TV (reality; Canada, 2007–2008)
- Frankie Drake Mysteries (Canada, 2017–2021)
- Fringe (US, 2008–2013)
- Furuhata Ninzaburō (Japan, 1994–2006)
- La Fuerza: Unidad de Combate (Peru, 2011)
- The Fugitive (US, 1963–1967 & 2000–2001)
- Funky Squad (comedy; Australia, 1997)

== G ==
- Gabriel's Fire (US, 1990–1991)
- Galileo (Japan, 2007)
- Garda ar Lár (Ireland, 2009)
- The Gentle Touch (UK, 1980–1984)
- Gerak Khas (Malaysia, 1999–2021)
- Gestatten, mein Name ist Cox (West Germany, 1961–1965)
- Gideon's Way (UK, 1965–1966)
- The Glades (US, 2010–2013)
- Glory Days (US, 2002)
- Gold Coast Cops (reality; Australia, 2014)
- Good Cop (UK, 2012)
- The Good Guys (US, 2010)
- Gorilla – The Police 8th Investigation Unit (Japan, 1989)
- Gotham (US, 2014–2019)
- La Gran Sangre (Peru, 2006–2007)
- Grace (UK, 2021–present)
- Graceland (US, 2013–2015)
- Griff (US, 1973–1974)
- Grimm (US, 2011–2017)
- Gun Metal Grey (HK, 2010)

== H ==
- Hannibal (US, 2013–2015)
- Hack (US, 2002–2004)
- Hamish Macbeth (UK, 1995–1997)
- Happy Valley (UK, 2014–2016 & 2023)
- Hardcastle and McCormick (US, 1983–1986)
- Harry O (US, 1974–1976)
- Hart to Hart (US, 1979–1984)
- Hawaii Five-O (US, 1968–1980)
- Hawaii Five-0 (US, 2010–2020)
- Hawaiian Eye (US, 1959–1963)
- Hawaiian Heat (US, 1984)
- Hawk (US, 1966)
- Hazell (UK, 1977–1978)
- Heartbeat (UK, 1992–2010)
- Heartlanders (Singapore, 2002–2005)
- Heat of the Sun (UK, 1998)
- Hec Ramsey (US, 1972–1974)
- Heroes (US, 2006–2010)
- Hetty Wainthropp Investigates (UK, 1996–1998)
- Hidden Assets (Ireland/Canada/Belgium, 2021–2023)
- High Incident (US, 1996–1997)
- Highway Patrol (US, 1955–1959)
- Hill Street Blues (US, 1981–1987)
- Hinterland (UK, 2013–2016)
- HolbyBlue (UK, 2007–2008)
- Homicide (Australia, 1964–1977)
- Homicide: Life on the Street (US, 1993–1999)
- Homicidios (Spain, 2011)
- Honey West (US, 1965–1966)
- Hong Kong (US, 1960–1961)
- Hot Pursuit (reality; US, 2006–2008)
- Hot Shots (Canada, 1986)
- Hudson & Rex (Canada, 2019–present)
- Human Target (US/Canada, 2010–2011)
- Hunter (US, 1984–1991)
- Hunter's Walk (UK, 1973–1976)
- The Huntress (US, 2000–2001)

== I ==
- Il sistema (Italy, 2016)
- I misteri di Laura (Italy, 2015)
- Im Namen des Gesetzes (Germany, 1994–2008)
- In the Heat of the Night (US, 1988–1994)
- In Justice (US, 2006)
- In Plain Sight (US, 2008–2012)
- An Inspector Calls (UK, 1982)
- Ikaw ay Pag-Ibig (Philippines, 2011–2012)
- Inspector George Gently (UK, 2007–2017)
- Inspector Lewis (UK, 2006–2015) – See also: Lewis
- The Inspector Lynley Mysteries (UK, 2001–2007)
- Inspector Montalbano (Italy, 1999–2021)
- Inspector Morse (UK, 1987–2000)
- Inspector Rex (Austria/Germany/Italy, 1994–2004)
- Inspector Wexford (UK, 1987–2000)
- Instinct (US, 2018–2019)
- The Investigators (US, 1961)
- Ironside (US, 1967–1975)
- Ironside (US, 2013)
- It Takes a Thief (US, 1968–1970)
- iZombie (US, 2015–2019)

== J ==
- J. J. Starbuck (US, 1988)
- Jack Taylor (Ireland, 2010)
- Jack and Jill sa Diamond Hills (Philippines, 2023–2024)
- JAG (US, 1995–2005)
- Jake and the Fatman (US, 1987–1992)
- Janbaaz (Pakistan, 2019–2020)
- Jane Doe (US, 2005–2008)
- Jango (comedy; UK, 1961)
- Jigsaw (US, 1972–1973)
- Joe Forrester (US, 1975–1976)
- Johnny Midnight (US, 1960)
- Johnny Staccato (US, 1959–1960)
- Jonathan Creek (UK, 1997–2004 & 2010)
- Jordskott (Sweden, 2015)
- Judd, for the Defense (US, 1967–1969)
- Judge John Deed (UK, 2001–2007)
- Juliet Bravo (UK, 1980–1985)
- Justified (US, 2010–2015)
  - Justified: City Primeval (US, 2023–present)
- Juvenile Jury (game show, US, 1947–1954)

== K ==
- K-Ville (US, 2007)
- Kailangan Ko'y Ikaw (Philippines, 2013)
- Kalgoorlie Cops (reality; Australia, 2011)
- Kavanagh QC (UK, 1995–2001)
- Kaz (US, 1978–1979)
- Keen Eddie (US, 2003)
- Kidnapped (US, 2006–2007)
- The Kill Point (US, 2007)
- The Killing (Denmark, 2007–2012) – Danish title Forbrydelsen
  - The Killing (US, 2011–2013)
- Kilo Tango Mike KTM (Nepal, 2010–present)
- King (Canada, 2011–2012)
- The Knock (UK, 1994–2000)
- Kojak (US, 1973–1978)
  - Kojak (US, 2005)
- Der Kommissar (West Germany, 1969–1975)
- Die Kommissarin (Germany, 1994–2006)
- Kottan ermittelt (Austria, 1976–1984)
- Kriminálka Anděl (Czech Republic, 2008–2014)
- Das Kriminalmuseum (West Germany, 1963–1970)
- Kryminalni (Poland, 2004–2008)

== L ==
- L.A. Heat (US, 1999)
- Lady Blue (US, 1985)
- Lanigan's Rabbi (US, 1977)
- LAPD: Life on the Beat (reality; US, 1995–1999)
- La porta rossa (Italy, 2017–present)
- Las Vegas (US, 2003–2008)
- The Last Detective (UK, 2003–2007)
- The Last Precinct (comedy; US, 1986)
- The Law and Harry McGraw (US, 1987–1988)
- Law & Order (US, 1990–2010 & 2022–present)
  - Law & Order: Special Victims Unit (US, 1999–present)
    - Закон и порядок: отдел оперативных расследований (Law & Order: Division of Field Investigation) – official foreign adaptation of Law & Order: Special Victims Unit (Russia, 2007–2011)
  - Law & Order: Criminal Intent (US, 2001–2011)
    - Paris Enquêtes Criminelles (Paris Criminal Investigations) – official foreign adaptation of Law & Order: Criminal Intent (France, 2007–2008)
  - Law & Order: Trial by Jury (US, 2005–2006)
  - Law & Order: UK (UK, 2009–2014) – official foreign adaptation of Law & Order
  - Law & Order: LA (US, 2010–2011)
  - Law & Order: Organized Crime (US, 2021–present)
  - Law & Order Toronto: Criminal Intent (Canada 2024-Present)
- Leg Work (US, 1987)
- Les Petits Meurtres d'Agatha Christie (France, 2009–present)
- Lethal Weapon (US, 2016–2018)
- Leverage (US, 2008–2012)
- Lewis (UK, 2006–2015) – screened in the US as Inspector Lewis
- Der letzte Bulle (Germany, 2010–2014)
- Lie to Me (US, 2009–2011)
- Life (US, 2007–2009)
- Life on Mars (UK, 2006–2007)
  - Life on Mars (US, 2008–2009)
- Lincoln Heights (US, 2007–2009)
- Lincoln Rhyme: Hunt for the Bone Collector (US, 2020)
- Line of Duty (UK, 2012–2021)
- Link Men (Australia, 1970–1971)
- The Listener (Canada, 2009–2014)
- Lives of Omission (HK, 2011)
- L'ispettore Coliandro (Italy, 2006–present)
- Longstreet (US, 1971–1972)
- Lord Peter Wimsey (UK, 1972–1975)
- Los misterios de Laura (Spain, 2014–2016)
- Lupin the 3rd vs. Detective Conan (Japan, 2009)
- Luther (UK, 2010–2019)
- Lucifer (US, 2016–2021)

== M ==
- M Squad (US, 1957–1960)
- MacGruder and Loud (US, 1985)
- MacGyver (US/Canada, 1985–1992)
- MacGyver (US, 2016–2021)
- Madigan (US, 1972)
- Magnum, P.I. (US, 1980–1988)
- Magnum P.I. (US, 2018–2024)
- Mga Lihim ni Urduja (Philippines, 2023)
- Maigret (UK, 1960–1963)
- Maigret (UK, 1992–1993)
- Major Crimes (US, 2012–2018)
- Maltese - Il romanzo del Commissario (Italy, 2017)
- The Man From Blackhawk (US, 1959–1960)
- Man in a Suitcase (UK, 1967–1968)
- Man with a Camera (US, 1958–1960)
- Mancuso, FBI (US, 1989–1990)
- Manhunt (US, 1959–1961)
- Manhunt (US, 2017–2020)
- Mannix (US, 1967–1975)
- Marcella (UK, 2016–present)
- Mare of Easttown (US, 2021)
- Markham (US, 1959–1960)
- Marple (UK, 2004–2013) – See also: Miss Marple
- Martial Law (US, 1998–2000)
- Martin Kane, Private Eye (US, 1949–1955)
- Matlock (US, 1986–1995)
- Matlock Police (Australia, 1971–1975)
- Matt Houston (US, 1982–1985)
- May Bukas Pa (Philippines, 2009–2010)
- Mayans M.C. (US, 2018–2023)
- McBride (US, 2005–2008)
- McCallum (UK, 1995–1998)
- McCloud (US, 1970–1977)
- McCoy (US, 1975–1976)
- McDonald & Dodds (UK, 2020–present)
- McMillan & Wife (US, 1971–1977)
- Medium (US, 2005–2011)
- Meet McGraw (US, 1957–1958)
- Memphis Beat (US, 2010–2011)
- The Mentalist (US, 2008–2015)
- Merseybeat (UK, 2001–2004)
- Mesto tieňov (Slovakia, 2008–2012)
- Metamorphosis (Singapore, 2007)
- Miami Vice (US, 1984–1990)
- The Michael Richards Show (US, 2000)
- Michael Shayne (US, 1960–1961)
- Mickey Spillane's Mike Hammer (US, 1958–1960 & 1984–1985)
- Midnight Caller (US, 1988–1991)
- Midsomer Murders (UK, 1997–present)
- Millennium (US, 1996–1999)
- The Misadventures of Sheriff Lobo (US, 1979–1981)
- Miss Fisher's Murder Mysteries (Australia, 2012)
- Miss Marple (UK, 1984–1992) – See also: Marple
- Mr. and Mrs. North (US, 1952–1954)
- Mr. Lucky (US, 1958–1962)
- M.I.T.: Murder Investigation Team (UK, 2003–2005)
- Modus (Sweden, 2015–2017)
- The Mod Squad (US, 1968–1973)
- Monk (US, 2002–2009)
- Moon Over Miami (US, 1993)
- Moonlight (US, 2007–2008)
- Moonlighting (US, 1985–1989)
- Ein Mord für Quandt (Germany, 1997–1998)
- Mortimer's Patch (New Zealand, 1982)
- Most Wanted (US, 1976–1977)
- Motive (Canada, 2013–2016)
- Murder 101 (US, 2006–2008)
- Murder Call (Australia, 1997–2000)
- Murder City (UK, 2004–2006)
- Murder in Suburbia (UK, 2004–2005)
- Murder One (US, 1995–1997)
- Murder Rooms (UK, 2000–2001)
- Murder, She Wrote (US, 1984–1996)
- The Murders (Canada, 2019)
- Murphy's Law (UK, 2001–2007)
- Murdoch Mysteries (Canada, 2008–present)
- The Mysteries of Laura (US, 2014–2016)
- Mystery Woman (US, 2003–2007)

== N ==
- Naked City (US, 1958–1963)
- Nash Bridges (US, 1996–2001)
- NCIS (US, 2003–present)
  - NCIS: Los Angeles (US, 2009–2023)
  - NCIS: New Orleans (US, 2014–2021)
  - NCIS: Hawaiʻi (US, 2021–2024)
  - NCIS: Sydney (Australia, 2023–present)
  - NCIS: Origins (US, 2024–present)
  - NCIS: Tony & Ziva (US, 2025)
  - NCIS: New York (US, 2026-present)
- The New Adventures of Charlie Chan (US/UK, 1957–1958)
- New Amsterdam (US, 2008)
- The New Avengers (UK, 1976–1977)
- The New Detectives (documentary; US, 1996–2005)
- New Scotland Yard (UK, 1972–1974)
- New Tricks (UK, 2004–2015)
- New York Undercover (US, 1994–1998)
- Newton's Cradle (Egypt/US, 2021)
- Night Court (comedy; US, 1984–1992)
- Night Heat (Canada, 1985–1989)
- Noah (Philippines, 2010–2011)
- No Hiding Place (UK, 1959–1967)
- Non uccidere (Italy, 2015–2018)
- No Offence (UK, 2015–2018)
- Notruf Hafenkante (Germany, 2007–present)
- Numb3rs (US, 2005–2010)
- NYC 22 (US, 2012)
- N.Y.P.D. (US, 1967–1969)
- NYPD Blue (US, 1993–2005)

== O ==
- Oberinspektor Marek (Austria, 1963–1970)
- Ohara (US, 1987–1988)
- O'Hara, U.S. Treasury (US, 1971–1972)
- On Call (Crime, Thriller; US, 2025)
- Operation Good Guys (comedy; UK, 1997–2000)
- Organised Crime Unit (Czech Republic, 2011–2016)
- The Outsider (US, 2018)
- Owen Marshall: Counselor at Law (US, 1971–1974)

== P ==
- Pacific Blue (US, 1996–2000)
- Painkiller Jane (US, 2007)
- Palace Guard (US, 1991)
- Paranoid (UK, 2016)
- Parco P.I. (reality; US, 2006)
- Paris Enquêtes Criminelles (France 2007–2008) – See also: Law & Order: Criminal Intent
- Paul Temple (UK, 1969–1971)
- PAW Patrol (kids, Canada, 2013–present)
- Per amore per vendetta (Italy, 2001)
- Perception (US, 2012–2015)
- Perry Mason (US, 1957–1966)
- Person of Interest (US, 2011–2016)
- Peter R. de Vries: Crime Reporter (The Netherlands, 1995–2012)
- Peter Gunn (US, 1958–1961)
- Pilyang Kerubin (Philippines, 2010)
- Pira-Pirasong Paraiso (Philippines, 2023–2024)
- Philip Marlowe, Private Eye (UK, 1983–1986)
- The Plainclothesman (US, 1949–1954)
- Played (Canada, 2013)
- Poirot (UK, 1989–2013)
- Police (documentary; UK, 1981)
- Police Academy: The Series (comedy; US, 1997–1998)
- Police & Thief (comedy; Singapore, 2004–2007)
- Police Camera Action! (reality; UK, 1994–2010)
- Police Interceptors (reality; UK, 2008–present)
- Police Rescue (Australia, 1989–1996)
- Police Squad! (comedy; US, 1982)
- Police Station (US, 1959)
- Police Story (US, 1973–1977)
- Police Surgeon (Canada/US, 1971–1974)
- Police Woman (US, 1974–1978)
- Police Woman of Broward County (US, 2009)
- Police Woman of Maricopa County (US, 2010)
- Politiet (reality; Norway, 2004 & 2009–present)
- The Pretender (US, 1996–2000)
- Prime Suspect (UK, 1991–2006)
- Power Rangers S.P.D. (Japan/US, 2005)
- Případy 1. oddělení (Czech Republic, 2014–2016)
- Prison Break (US, 2005–2009)
- Private Eyes (Canada/US, 2016–2021)
- Prodigal Son (US, 2019–2021)
- The Professionals (UK, 1977–1983)
- Professor T. (Germany, 2017)
- Professor T. (Belgium, 2015–2019)
- Professor T. (UK, 2021–present)
- Profilage (France, 2009–2020)
- The Profiler (US, 1996–2000)
- Pros & Cons (US, 1991–1992)
- The Protectors (UK, 1972–1974)
- Provaci ancora prof (Italy, 2005–2017)
- Psych (comedy drama; US, 2006–2014)
- Public Eye (UK, 1965–1975)

== Q ==
- Quincy, M.E. (US, 1976–1983)
- Quantico (US, 2015–2018)

== R ==
- Raines (US, 2007)
- Randall and Hopkirk (Deceased) (UK, 1969–1970)
- Randall and Hopkirk (Deceased) (UK, 2000)
- Reacher (US, 2022–present)
  - Neagley (US, 2026–present)
- Rebus (UK, 2000–2007)
- Rejseholdet (Denmark, 2000–2004)
- Remington Steele (US, 1982–1987)
- Republic of Doyle (Canada, 2010–2014)
- Reno 911! (comedy; US, 2003–2009)
- The Responder (UK, 2022–present)
- Richard Diamond, Private Detective (US, 1957–1960)
- Riptide (US, 1983–1986)
- River (UK, 2016)
- Rizzoli & Isles (US, 2010–2016)
- Roba (Finland, 2012–present)
- Road Wars (reality; UK, 2003–2010)
- RoboCop: The Series (sci-fi; Canada/US, 1994)
- Rocco Schiavone (Italy, 2016–present)
- The Rockford Files (US, 1974–1980)
- Rockliffe's Babies (UK, 1987–1988)
- The Rookie (US, 2018–present)
- The Rookie: Feds (US, 2022–2023)
- Rookie Blue (Canada, 2010–2015)
- Rookies (reality; US, 2008–2009)
- The Rookies (US, 1972–1976)
- Rosemary & Thyme (UK, 2003–2007)
- Rumpole of the Bailey (UK, 1975–1992)
- Rush (Australia, 2008–2011)
- The Ruth Rendell Mysteries (UK, 1987–2000)

== S ==
- The Saint (UK, 1962–1969)
- Salamander (Belgium, 2012–2018)
- Sara Stein (Germany, 2015)
- Saving Grace (US, 2007–2010)
- Scott & Bailey (UK, 2011–2016)
- SCU: Serious Crash Unit (reality; New Zealand, 2004–2015)
- Search (US, 1972–1973)
- Sebastian Bergman (Sweden, 2012)
- Second Verdict (UK, 1976)
- The Secret Service (UK, 1969)
- Seletar Robbery (Singapore, 1982)
- Sergeant Preston of the Yukon (US, 1955–1958)
- Serious and Organised (UK, 2003)
- Shades of Truth (fantasy; HK, 2004–2005)
- Shades of Blue (US, 2016–2018)
- The Shadow Line (UK, 2011)
- Shaft (US, 1973–1974)
- Shark in the Park (New Zealand, 1989–1992)
- Sharman (UK, 1995–1996)
- Shattered (Canada, 2010)
- Sherlock (UK, 2010–2017)
- Sherwood (UK, 2022–present)
- Shetland (UK, 2013–present)
- The Shield (US, 2002–2008)
- Shoestring (UK, 1979–1980)
- Shotgun Slade (US, 1959–1961)
- Sidestreet (Canada, 1975–1978)
- Silent Number (Australia, 1974–1975)
- Silent Witness (UK, 1996–present)
- Silk Stalkings (US, 1991–1999)
- Simon & Simon (US, 1981–1989)
- Sinan Toprak ist der Unbestechliche (Germany, 1999–2002)
- The Singing Detective (UK, 1986)
- Sincerely Yours in Cold Blood (Finland, 2000–2005)
- Single-Handed (Ireland, 2007–2010)
- Siska (Germany, 1998–2008)
- Sky Cops (reality; UK, 2006–2008)
- Sledge Hammer! (comedy; US, 1986–1988)
- Sons of Anarchy (US, 2008–2014)
- SOKO München – originally known as SOKO 5113 (Germany/Austria, 1978–2020)
  - Leipzig Homicide – German title: SOKO Leipzig (Germany/Austria, 2001–present)
  - SOKO Kitzbühel (Germany/Austria, 2003–2021)
  - Cologne P.D. – German title: SOKO Köln (Germany/Austria, 2003–present)
  - SOKO Wismar (Germany/Austria, 2004–present)
  - SOKO Donau (known in Germany as SOKO Wien) (Germany/Austria, 2005–present)
  - SOKO Rhein-Main – originally known as Die Spezialisten: Kripo Rhein-Main (Germany/Austria, 2006–2007)
  - Stuttgart Homicide – German title: SOKO Stuttgart (Germany/Austria, 2009–present)
- Solo One (Australia, 1976)
- Softly, Softly (UK, 1966–1969)
- Softly, Softly: Task Force (UK, 1969–1976)
- Sonny Spoon (US, 1988)
- Sotto copertura (Italy, 2015–2017)
- South Africa: Special Task Force (reality; UK, 2005)
- South of Sunset (US, 1993)
- Southland (US, 2009–2013)
- Snoops (US, 1989–1990)
- Snoops (comedy; US, 1999–2000)
- SP (Japan, 2007–2008)
- Space Precinct (sci-fi; UK, 1994–1995)
- Special Branch (UK, 1969–1974)
- Special Unit 2 (US, 2001–2002)
- Specials (UK, 1991)
- Spenser: For Hire (US, 1985–1988)
- Spiral (Engrenages) (France, 2005–2020)
- Split Second (HK, 2004)
- Spooks (UK, 2002–2011)
- Spravedlnost (Czech Republic, 2017)
- Spring Tide (Sweden, 2016)
- Stahlnetz (West Germany/Germany, 1958–1968 & 1999–2000)
- Stalker (US, 2014–2015)
- Standoff (US, 2006–2007)
- Star Cops (UK, 1987)
- Starsky and Hutch (US, 1975–1979)
- Stockholm Requiem (Sweden, 2018)
- Stingers (Australia, 1998–2004)
- Stingray (US, 1986–1987)
- Stockinger (Austria, 1996–1997)
- Stone Undercover (Canada/US, 2002–2004) – syndicated title of program originally called Tom Stone
- Strangers (UK, 1978–1982)
- Street Justice (US, 1991–1993)
- Street Legal (Canada, 1987–1994)
- Street Legal (New Zealand, 2000–2003)
- Street Wars (reality; UK, 2005)
- The Streets of San Francisco (US, 1972–1977)
- The Strip (US, 1999–2000)
- The Strip (Australia, 2008)
- Sue Thomas: F.B.Eye (US/Canada, 2002–2005)
- Surfside Six (US, 1960–1962)
- Suspects (UK, 2014)
- Svět pod hlavou (Czech Republic, 2017)
- S.W.A.T. (US, 1975–1976)
- S.W.A.T. (US, 2017–2025)
  - S.W.A.T. Exiles (US, 2026-present)
- Sweating Bullets (Canada/Mexico/Israel, 1991–1993) – alternative title for Tropical Heat
- The Sweeney (UK, 1975–1978)
- Switch (US, 1975–1978)

== T ==
- Taggart (UK, 1983–2010)
- Take My Word For It (HK, 2002)
- Take Two (US, 2018)
- Taking the Falls (Canada, 1995–1996)
- Target (UK, 1977–1978)
- Tatort (Germany, 1970–present)
- The Team (Denmark, 2015)
- Telecrimes (UK, 1938–1939 & 1946)
- Ten 7 Aotearoa (New Zealand, 2002–2023)
- Tenafly (US, 1973–1974)
- Tenspeed and Brown Shoe (US, 1980)
- Thief Takers (UK, 1996–1997)
- The Thin Blue Line (comedy; UK, 1995–1996)
- The Thin Man (US, 1957–1959)
- Third Watch (US, 1999–2005)
- This Man Dawson (US, 1959–1960)
- Those Who Kill (Denmark, 2011)
- Those Who Kill (US, 2014)
- Titans (US, 2018–2023)
- T.J. Hooker (US, 1982–1986)
- To Catch the Uncatchable (HK, 2004)
- Today's FBI (US, 1981–1982)
- Tokusou Sentai Dekaranger (Japan, 2004–2005)
- To Get Unstuck In Time (HK, 2004)
- Tom Stone (Canada, 2002–2004) – also known as Stone Undercover when syndicated in the US
- Toma (US, 1973–1974)
- Top Cops (US/Canada, 1990–1993)
- A Touch of Cloth (comedy; UK, 2012–2014)
- A Touch of Frost (UK, 1992–2010)
- Traffic Blues (reality; Ireland, 2009–2011)
- Traffic Cops (reality; UK, 2003–present)
- Trautmann (Austria, 2000–2008)
- Triangle (Japan, 2009)
- Tribulacion (Peru, 2011)
- Trigger Point (UK, 2022–present)
- Triple Nine (Singapore, 1995–1998)
- Tropical Heat (Canada/Mexico/Israel, 1991–1993) – Also known as Sweating Bullets
- True Blue (US, 1989–1990)
- True Detective (US, 2014–present)
- True Files (Singapore, 2002–2007)
- True Heroes (Singapore, 2003)
- Twin Peaks (US, 1990–1991 & 2017)

== U ==
- Ultima pallottola (Italy, 2003)
- The Ultimate Crime Fighter (fantasy; HK, 2007)
- Una pallottola nel cuore (Italy, 2014–2018)
- Underbelly (Australia, 2008)
  - Underbelly: A Tale of Two Cities (Australia, 2009)
  - Underbelly: The Golden Mile (Australia, 2010)
  - Underbelly: Razor (Australia, 2011)
  - Underbelly: Badness (Australia, 2012)
  - Underbelly: Squizzy (Australia, 2013)
- Unforgettable (US, 2011–2016)
- Unforgotten (UK, 2015–present)
- Un passo dal cielo (Italy, 2011–present)
- An Unsuitable Job for a Woman (UK, 1997–2001)
- The Untouchables (US, 1959–1963)
- The Untouchables (US, 1993–1994)
- Untraceable Evidence (HK, 1997–1999)
- The Unusuals (US, 2009)

== V ==
- The Valhalla Murders (Iceland, 2019)
- Van der Valk (UK, 1972–1973, 1977, 1991–1992)
- Van der Valk (UK, 2020–present)
- Vanished (US, 2006)
- Vega$ (US, 1978–1981)
- Vengeance Unlimited (US, 1998–1999)
- Vera (UK, 2011–2025)
- Veronica Mars (US, 2004–2007 & 2019)
- The Vice (UK, 1999–2003)
- Vigilante Force (HK, 2003)
- V.I.P. (US, 1998–2002)
- The Vise (US, 1954–1955)
- La viuda joven (Venezuela, 2011)

== W ==
- Walang Matigas na Pulis sa Matinik na Misis (Philippines, 2023–2025)
- Waking the Dead (UK, 2000–2011)
- Walker, Texas Ranger (US, 1993–2001)
- Walker (US, 2021–2024)
- Wallander (Sweden, 2005–2013)
  - Wallander (UK, 2008–2016)
- Warehouse 13 (US, 2009–2014)
- Water Rats (Australia, 1996–2001)
- WEGA – Die Spezialeinheit der Polizei (Austria, 2011)
- White Collar (US, 2009–2014)
- White Collar Blue (Australia, 2002–2003)
- Whitechapel (UK, 2009–2013)
- Wild Card (US, 2003–2005)
- Wild Cards (Canada, 2024-)
- Wildside (Australia, 1997–1999)
- The Wire (US, 2002–2008)
- Wire in the Blood (UK, 2002–2008)
- Wiseguy (US, 1987–1990)
- Wisting (Norway, 2019)
- Without a Trace (US, 2002–2009)
- Wolcott (UK, 1981)
- Wolf (US, 1989–1990)
- Women's Murder Club (US, 2007–2008)
- Wycliffe (UK, 1994–1998)

== X ==
- The X-Files (US/Canada, 1993–2002 & 2016–2018)
- The XYY Man (UK, 1976–1977)

== Y ==
- Yellowthread Street (UK, 1990)
- Young Lions (Australia, 2002)

== Z ==
- Z-Cars (UK, 1962–1978)
- Zen (UK/Italy/Germany, 2011)
- Zettai Reido (Japan, 2010–2011)
- Zone Stad (Belgium, 2003–2013)
- Zorn (Germany, 2014–2017)
