= Miguel Herz-Kestranek =

Austrian actor and author

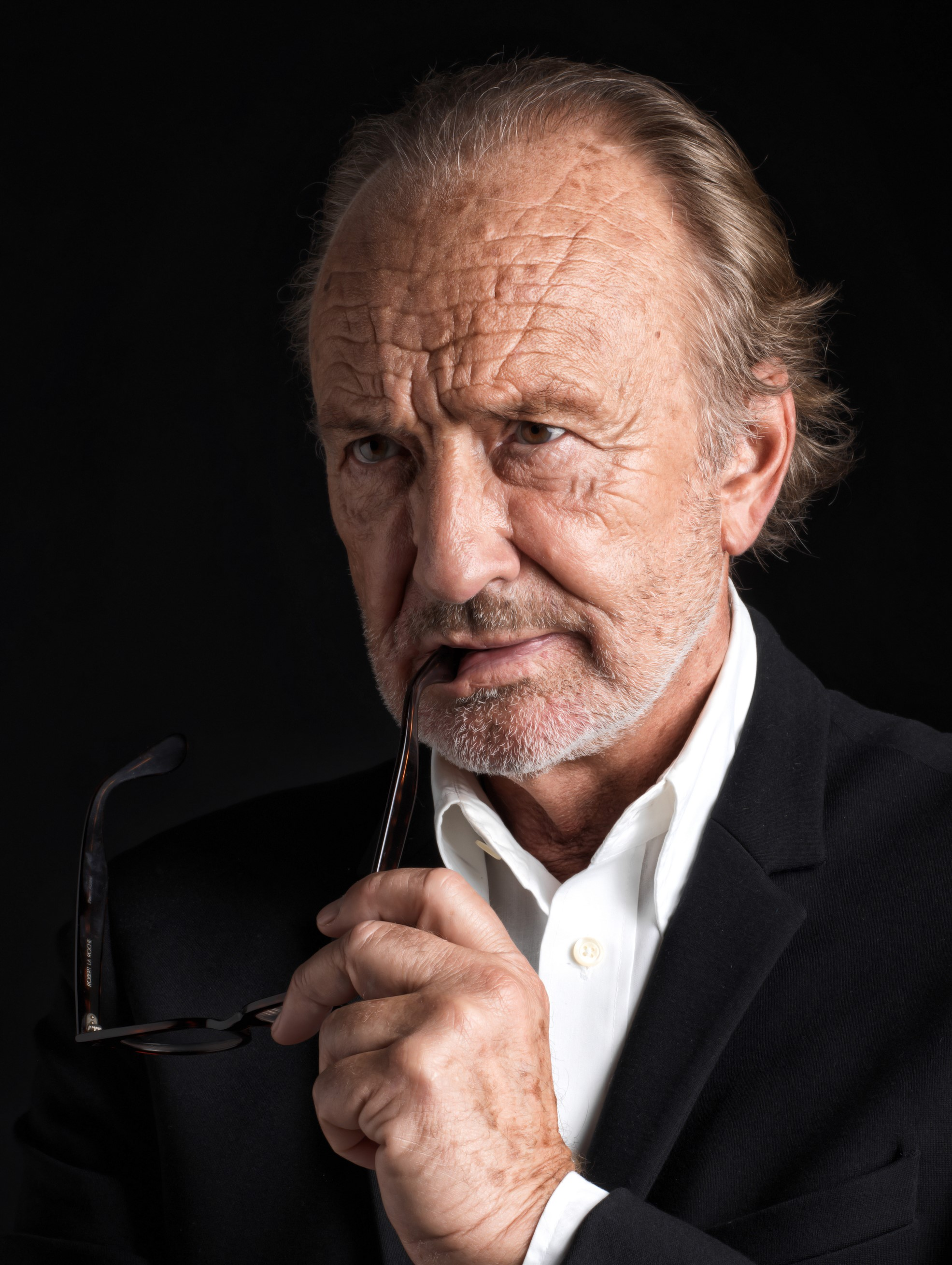
- Herz-Kestranek in 2018
- Born: 3 April 1948 (age 77); St. Gallen, Canton of St. Gallen, Switzerland
- Occupations: Actor; Author
- Spouse: Miriam (after 2016)
- Children: Theresa
- Awards: See Awards
- Website: Official website (in German)

Miguel Herz-Kestranek (born 3 April 1948) is an Austrian actor and author.

== Life ==
Miguel Herz-Kestranek was born the son of an industry and art family from the former Viennese Jewish upper middle class on April 3, 1948, in St. Gallen, Canton of St. Gallen, Switzerland.

Born in a Jewish family and raised as a Christian, Miguel Herz-Kestranek established himself as a "Jewish Buddhist" through his friendship with the Buddhist monk Banthe Seelawansa Thero, who lives in Vienna.

Miguel Herz-Kestranek has been married to Miriam since September 2016 and has a daughter, Theresa, who is an alternative dog trainer in Lower Austria from an earlier relationship with the Austrian actress Dorothea Parton.

Growing up by the lake, Miguel Herz-Kestranek is a passionate sailor and founded the former Austrian O-dinghy association in the 1980s. In addition to many regattas, he also participated in the European O-Dinghy Championships in 2005 on Lake Wolfgang. As early as 1984 he donated a prize named after him.

Miguel Herz-Kestranek lives in seclusion, alternating between Vienna and Lake Wolfgang.

== Volunteering and memberships ==
- 1993 Founder and director of the Österreichischer Filmschauspielerverband (VÖFS), president since 2003
- 1993 to 1995 member board of the Dachverband der Österreichischen Filmschaffenden
- 2000 to 2011 vice president of the Österreichischer P.E.N.-Club
- since 2000 curation member of the DÖW of the Dokumentationsarchiv des österreichischen Widerstandes
- since 2000 founder and president of the Gesellschaft zur Förderung Österreichischer Advent-Kultur
- since 2004 advisory board member of the Österreichische Gesellschaft für Europapolitik (ÖGfE)
- since 2008 vice president of the Österreichische Gesellschaft für Exilforschung (ÖGE)
- 2012 founder member of the BürgerInnenforum Europa 2020

== Filmography (selection) ==
- 1974: Fräulein Else
- 1974: Perahim – die zweite Chance
- 1975: Die Alpensaga
- 1975: Der selige Herr aus dem Parlament
- 1976: Die liebe Familie
- 1976: Abschiede (Hochzeitsreise)
- 1978: Die belgische Republik
- 1978: 1815 – Der Wiener Kongress
- 1978: Tod eines Vaters
- 1978: Das Licht der Gerechten
- 1978: Alles Leben ist Chemie
- 1979: Konzert im 7. Stock
- 1979: Das Geheimnis der alten Dame
- 1979: Breakthrough
- 1979: Erbschaft
- 1979: Die Alpensaga
- 1980: Attentat in Gastein
- 1980: Klausenberger Geschichten
- 1981: Der Repräsentant
- 1991: Anna Berg
- 1981: Der Narr von Wien
- 1981: Familie Merian
- 1981: Firefox
- 1982: Die Güte der Fürsten
- 1982: Die liebe Familie
- 1982: Familie Merian
- 1982: Klausenberger Geschichten
- 1982: Der exekutierte Mensch
- 1983: Capri – Musik die sich entfernt
- 1983: Kudlich
- 1983: The Devil's Lieutenant
- 1983: Wagner
- 1983: Goldene Zeiten II
- 1984: End of the World
- 1984: Der Turm
- 1984: Flucht ohne Ende
- 1984: Tatort: Der Mann mit den Rosen (as Assistant Franz Ullmann)
- 1985: Tatort: Fahrerflucht (as Assistant Franz Ullmann)
- 1985: Tatort: Nachtstreife (as Assistant Franz Ullmann)
- 1985: Tal der Pappeln
- 1985: '38 – Vienna Before the Fall
- 1985: Alles Komödie
- 1985: Merken Sie sich dieses Gesicht
- 1986: Ein Porträt für Mario
- 1986: Wie den eigenen Sohn
- 1986: Marionetten
- 1986: Eine Minute dunkel macht uns nicht blind
- 1986: Moselbrück
- 1986: Tatort: Der Schnee vom vergangenen Jahr (as ermittelnder Journalist Lutinsky)
- 1987: Bravissimo
- 1987: Hafendetektiv
- 1987: Der Schatz des Kaisers
- 1987: Ein Mann nach meinem Herzen
- 1988: In Zeiten wie diesen
- 1988: Kaffeehausgeschichte
- 1988: Wie würden Sie entscheiden
- 1989: Moselbrück
- 1989: Wenn das die Nachbarn wüßten
- 1989: Eurocops
- 1989: The Strauss Dynasty
- 1990: The Master of the Day of Judgment
- 1990–2000: SOKO 5113 (TV series; three episodes)
- 1990: Der Erfolg Ihres Lebens
- 1991: The Mixer
- 1991: Wolfgang Amadeus Mozart
- 1992: Der Diamant des Geisterkönigs
- 1992: The Lucona Affair
- 1992: Und morgen der Opernball
- 1993: Wirklich schade um Papa
- 1993: Familie Merian
- 1993: Im Kreis der Iris
- 1993: Peter Strohm
- 1993: Der exekutierte Mensch
- 1994: Radetzkymarsch
- 1994: Ein unvergessenes Wochenende in den Schweizer Alpen
- 1994: Hochzeitsreisen
- 1994: Die Nacht der Nächte
- 1994: Fitness
- 1994: Geschichten aus Österreich
- 1994: Iris & Violetta
- 1994: Tonino und Toinette
- 1995: Alice auf der Flucht
- 1995: Daniel, Philipp und das Wunder der Liebe
- 1995: Das Kapital
- 1995: Drei in fremden Betten
- 1995: Ein Mann in der Krise
- 1995: Schlosshotel Orth
- 1996: Die Unzertrennlichen
- 1996: Die Eisenstraße
- 1996: Klinik unter Palmen
- 1996: Ehebruch – Eine tödliche Falle
- 1996: Drei Tage Angst
- 1996: Weißblaue Geschichten
- 1996: Katrin ist die Beste
- 1997: Sardtsch
- 1997: Infoline
- 1997: Alle meine Töchter
- 1997: Derrick
- 1997: Kommissar Rex
- 1998: JETS – Leben am Limit
- 1998: Kanadische Träume
- 1998: Weißblaue Geschichten
- 1998: Drei Tage Angst (TV film)
- 1999: Der Bulle von Tölz: Tod am Hahnenkamm
- 1999: Rosamunde Pilcher – Möwen im Wind
- 1999: SOKO 5113
- 1999: Sophie – Sissis kleine Schwester
- 1999: Kanadische Träume – eine Familie
- 2000: Donna Leon – Vendetta
- 2000: Alle meine Töchter
- 2000: Der Bestseller
- 2000: Schlosshotel Orth
- 2000: Sinan Toprak ist der Unbestechliche
- 2000: Stimme des Herzens
- 2001: Liebe unter weißen Segeln
- 2001: Sass
- 2001: Die Kumpel
- 2001: Uprising
- 2002: Das unbezähmbare Herz
- 2002: Die Rosenheim-Cops
- 2002: Zwei Seiten der Liebe
- 2002: Mit Herz und Handschellen
- 2002: The Poet
- 2003: Mai Storia D‘Amore in Cucina
- 2003: Alles Glück dieser Erde
- 2003: Mädchen, Mädchen
- 2003: Mein Mann, mein Leben und du
- 2003: Wilde Engel
- 2003: Der Fürst und das Mädchen
- 2004: Weißblaue Wintergeschichten
- 2004: Der letzte Zeuge
- 2004: Die Patriarchin
- 2004: Klimt
- 2004: Mit Herz und Handschellen
- 2004: Rose unter Dornen
- 2004: Alpenglühen 2
- 2005: Der letzte Zeuge
- 2005: Agathe kann’s nicht lassen
- 2005: Der Fürst und das Mädchen
- 2005: Take Me Home
- 2005: Im Tal der wilden Rosen
- 2005: Liebes Leid und Lust
- 2005: Rosamunde Pilcher – Segel der Liebe
- 2005: Weißblaue Wintergeschichten
- 2006: Im Tal der wilden Rosen – Was das Herz befiehlt
- 2006: Herzdamen
- 2006: A Pirate's Heart
- 2006: La Freccia Nera
- 2006: König der Herzen
- 2007: Utta Danella – Tanz auf dem Regenbogen
- 2007: Bible Code
- 2007: Doctor’s Diary
- 2007: Inga Lindström – Ein Wochenende in Söderholm
- 2007: SOKO Donau
- 2007: Zodiak – Der Horoskop-Mörder
- 2008: Der Tote im Elchwald
- 2008: Der Fall des Lemming
- 2008: Johanna – Köchin aus Leidenschaft
- 2008: SOKO Leipzig
- 2008: Zwei Ärzte sind einer zuviel
- 2009: Ausgerechnet Afrika
- 2009: The Angel Maker
- 2009: Die Wanderhure
- 2009: Nanga Parbat
- 2010: Das Traumhotel – Sri Lanka
- 2010: Alarm für Cobra 11 – Die Autobahnpolizei
- 2010: Pius XII: Under the Roman Sky
- 2011: Beate Uhse
- 2011: The Perjured Farmer
- 2011: The Gold Quest: A Journey to Panama
- 2011: Um Himmels Willen
- 2012: Fuchs und Gans
- 2012: The Other Wife
- 2012: Heroes
- 2013: Angélique
- 2013: Um Himmels Willen
- 2015: Ein starkes Team: Beste Freunde
- 2017: Die Ketzerbraut
- 2017: Das doppelte Lottchen
- 2018: Lena Lorenz – Zwei Väter
- 2019: Vorstadtweiber
- 2019: Meiberger – im Kopf des Täters
- 2019: Schnell ermittelt

== Awards ==
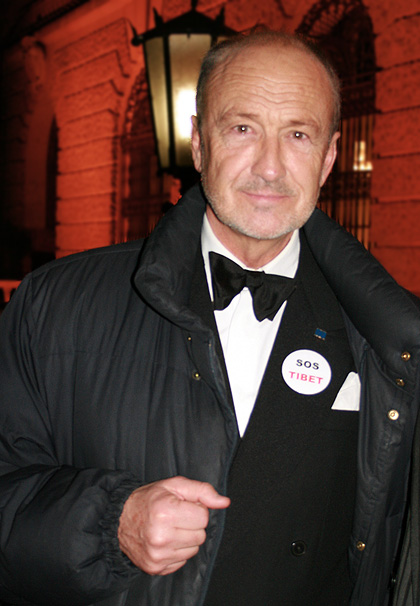
Miguel Herz-Kestranek at the Romy TV awards in 2008

- Wahl zum beliebtesten Tatort-Kommissar in Österreich durch die Leser der Kronenzeitung (1986)
- Österreichisches Ehrenkreuz für Wissenschaft und Kunst (Oktober 2000)
- Kulturehrenzeichen der Stadt Bad Ischl (2006)
- Romy-Nominierung Kategorie „beliebtester Schauspieler“ (Mai 2008)
- Botschafter der Tracht/Konrad Mautner-Preis (2008)
- Großes Ehrenzeichen für Verdienste um das Bundesland Niederösterreich (2013)

== Publications ==
- Oh käm´s auf mich nicht an! Verlag NÖ Pressehaus, 1987
- Gereimte Sammelschüttler. Mit Wortspenden geistreicher Schüttelgenossen. Brandstätter, Wien 1995, ISBN 3-85447-606-X
- Also hab ich nur mich selbst! Stefan Herz-Kestranek – Stationen eines großbürgerlichen Emigranten 1938 bis 1945. (gemeinsam mit Marie-Theres Arnbom), Böhlau, Wien 1997, ISBN 3205987683
- Mit Éjzes bin ich versehen: Erlebtes, Erdachtes und Erlachtes. (2. Auflage) Ibera, Wien 1998, ISBN 3900436703
- Mir zugeschüttelt. Neueste und allerneueste Schüttelreime aus österreichischem Volksmund von Apetlon bis Zürs. Brandstätter, Wien 1999, ISBN 3-85447-838-0
- Georg Terramare: Uns ward ein Kind geboren. Wiener Weihnachtslegenden. Miguel Herz-Kestranek (Herausgeber), Ibera, Wien 2000, ISBN 3900436711
- wos wea wo waun wia en wean: einbligge in de weana sö. Ibera, Wien 2002, ISBN 3-85052-144-3
- Wie der Auer Michl einen Christbaum holen ging. Ibera, Wien 2002, ISBN 3-85052-143-5
- Winterliches & Weihnachtliches aus dem alten Wien. Ibera, Wien 2005, ISBN 978-3-85052-203-8
- Wortmeldung – Polemiken, Pointen, Poesien. Ibera, Wien 2007, ISBN 978-3-85052-240-3
- Anny Robert: Herrlich ist's in Tel Aviv – aus der Wiener Perspektiv'. Erinnerungen. Daniela Ellmauer, Miguel Herz-Kestranek und Albert Lichtblau (Herausgeber), Böhlau, Wien 2006, ISBN 978-3-205-77301-6
- In welcher Sprache träumen Sie? Österreichische Lyrik aus Exil und Widerstand. Anthologie, Miguel Herz-Kestranek, Konstantin Kaiser, Daniela Striegl (Herausgeber), Verlag der Theodor Kramer Gesellschaft, Wien 2007, ISBN 3-901602-25-9
- Die Frau von Pollak oder: Wie mein Vater jüdische Witze erzählte. Ibera Verlag, Wien 2011, ISBN 978-3-85052-300-4
- Lachertorten-mit Schlag! 40 Jahre Lachprogramme. Ibera Verlag, Wien 2019, ISBN 9783850523868
