= Austria (disambiguation) =

Austria, officially the Republic of Austria, is a European country.

Austria may also refer to:

== Places ==
=== Current ===
- Austria (European Parliament constituency)
- Lower Austria, a state of Austria
- Upper Austria, a state of Austria

=== Historical ===
- Austria (Lombard), a region in the Kingdom of the Lombards
- Margravate of Austria (c. 970–1156), the first settlement of Austria
- Duchy of Austria (1156–1453)
- Bailiwick of Austria (1260–1805), one of the subdivisions of the Teutonic Order
- Further Austria (1278–1805), historical possessions of Austria in former Swabia
- Habsburg Monarchy (1282–1918), collection of states ruled by the House of Habsburg, cored in Austria
- Archduchy of Austria (1453–1918), constituent crown land of the Habsburg Monarchy, Austrian Empire and Austria-Hungary
- Austrian Circle (1512–1806), an imperial circle in the Holy Roman Empire
- Austrian Empire (1804–1867)
- Austria-Hungary (1867–1918)
- Republic of German-Austria (1918–1919), rump state created out of the German-speaking parts of Austria-Hungary
- First Austrian Republic (1919–1934)
- Federal State of Austria (1934–1938)

=== Space ===
- 136 Austria, an asteroid

== Sports ==
- A1 Team Austria, the Austrian team of A1 Grand Prix
- FC Red Bull Salzburg or SV Austria Salzburg
- FK Austria Wien
- SC Austria Lustenau
- SV Austria Salzburg, the refounded club
- Austrian Circuit, race track, now called the Red Bull Ring
- Austrian Grand Prix, Formula 1 race

== Other uses ==
- House of Habsburg, also known as the House of Austria
- Austria (personification), a personification of the country, to which Čechie was a reaction
- Austria (surname)
- Austria (typeface), a typeface formerly used on all official road signage in Austria
- "Austria", a hymn tune based on "Gott erhalte Franz den Kaiser" by Haydn
- Austria Metall AG, a holding company
- Austria Microsystems, a semiconductor manufacturer
- Austria 9, a defunct Austrian television channel
- SS Austria, a ship launched in 1857
- MV APL Austria, a ship constructed in 2007

== See also ==
- Austrian (disambiguation)
- Australia (disambiguation)
- Austra (disambiguation)
- Australia, continent-country in the Southern Hemisphere
- Austrasia, north-eastern portion of the Kingdom of the Merovingian Franks
- Austria-Este, the last ruling house of the Duchy of Modena
- Norðri, Suðri, Austri and Vestri, dwarves in Norse mythology
- SK Austria Klagenfurt (disambiguation)
- Osterreich (disambiguation)
- Asturias
