= Klaus Ofczarek =

Austrian opera singer and actor (1939–2020)

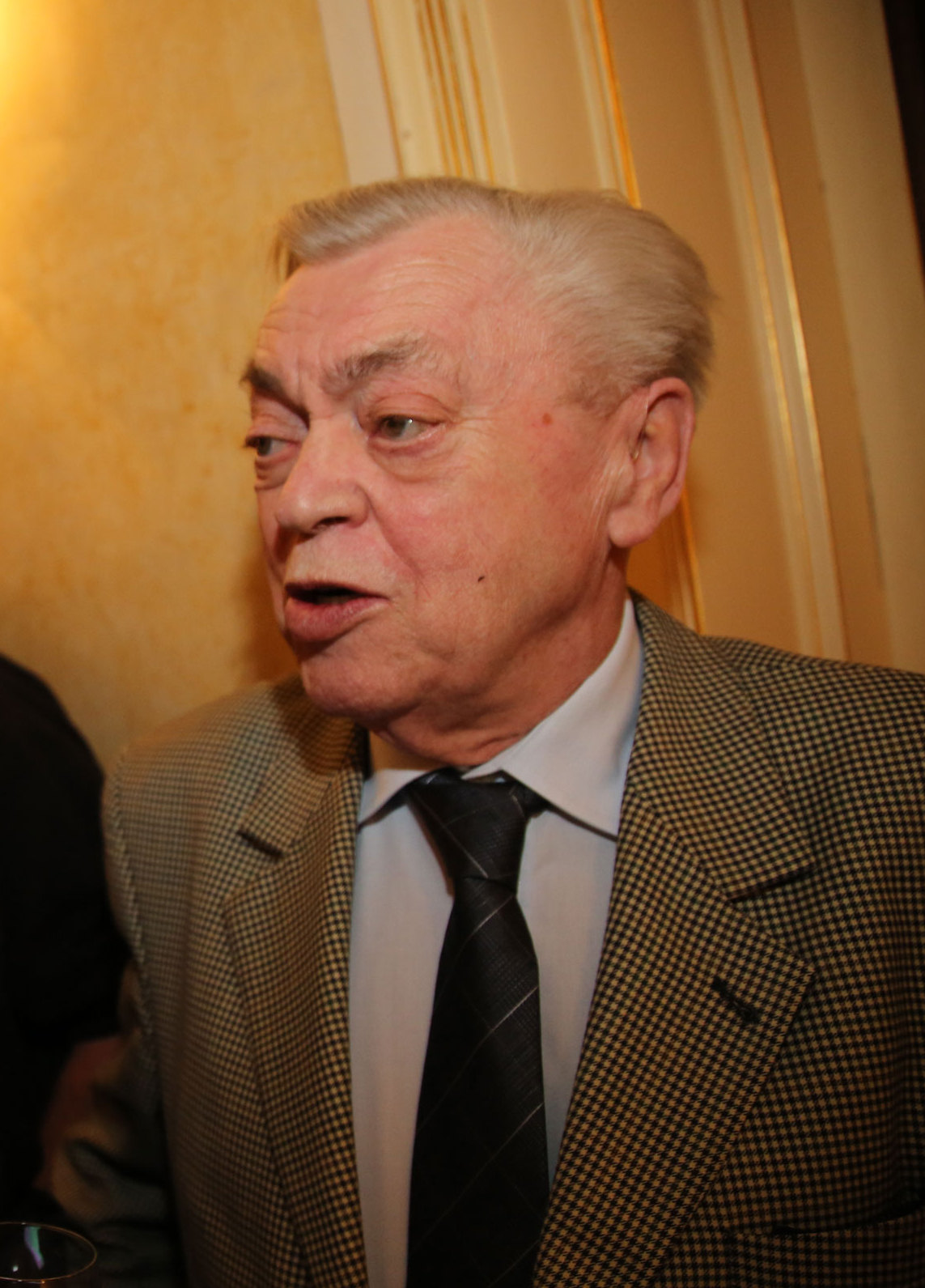
- Ofczarek in 2015
- Born: 17 March 1939; Vienna, German-occupied Austria
- Died: 6 December 2020 (aged 81); Vienna, Austria
- Occupation: Opera Singer

Klaus Ofczarek (17 March 1939 – 6 December 2020) was an Austrian tenor opera singer and actor.

== Filmography ==
- Tempo (1996)
- Inspector Rex (1996–2003)
- Stockinger (1997)
- Die Neue – Eine Frau mit Kaliber (1998)
- Drei Herren (1998)
- Julia – Eine ungewöhnliche Frau (1999–2003)
- Der Feuerteufel – Flammen des Todes (1999)
- Polt muss weinen (2000)
- Heimkehr der Jäger (2000)
- Die Frau, die einen Mörder liebte (2000)
- Happy Hour oder Glück und Glas (2000)
- Blumen für Polt (2001)
- Die Gottesanbeterin (2001)
- Verdammte Helden (2001)
- Ich gehöre dir (2002)
- Himmel, Polt und Hölle (2003)
- Polterabend (2003)
- Trautmann (2004)
- Der Weihnachtshund (2004)
- Klimt (2006)
- Freundschaft (2006)
- SOKO Donau (2007)
- Tatort: Exitus (2008)
- Todsünde (2008)
- North Face (2008)
- Krupp: A Family Between War and Peace (2009)
- Hinter blinden Fenstern (2009)
- Lautlos (2010)
- Die Wanderhure (2010)
- Gottes mächtige Dienerin (2011)
- Russisch Roulette (2012)
- Hanna's Decision (2012)
- Tom Turbo – Von 0 auf 111 (2013)
- Der Metzger und der Tote im Haifischbecken (2015)
- Tehran Taboo (2017)
