= Gundula Rapsch =

German actress (1963–2011)

- Born: 26 January 1963; Bochum, North Rhine-Westphalia, West Germany
- Died: 14 December 2011 (aged 48); Vienna, Austria
- Occupation: Actress
- Years active: 1980s–2011
- Children: 1

Gundula Rapsch (26 January 1963 – 14 December 2011) was a German actress of stage, screen and television. She began her career at Germany's Munich Kammerspiele and Schauburg as well as at Vienna's Volkstheater and was a member of the ensemble of the Theater in der Josefstadt between 1988 and 1991. Rapsch had roles on the Vienna edition of the ARD crime series Tatort in 1999 and was featured on 69 episodes of the ZDF series Cologne P.D. from 2003 to 2007. She played the primary role of the ORF series OP ruft Dr. Bruckner between 1996 and 2009.

== Biography ==
Rapsch was born in Bochum, on 26 January 1963. She took up acting lessons during her studies at Munich's Otto Falckenberg School of the Performing Arts, where she attained success in several genres. Rapsch followed up her training with engagements on the theatre stages in both Austria and Germany, specially at each of Germany's Munich Kammerspiele and Schauburg as well as Vienna's Volkstheater. She was a member of the ensemble of the Theater in der Josefstadt between 1988 and 1991. Rapsch played the part of Sophie in Herbstgarten by Lillian Hellman in 1990, which earned her the Josef Kainz Medal. She was elected Newcomer of the Year by Austrian critics the following year. At the Volkstheater, Rapsch played the part of Iphigenie in Iphigenia in Tauris by Johann Wolfgang von Goethe during 1999.

She featured frequently in parts on television. From 1998 to 2001, Rapsch portrayed the forensic specialist coroner Renata Lang for seven episodes of the Vienna edition of the ARD crime series Tatort, for which she received much recognition in Austria. She played the role of Mrs. Prtschaller in a July 2002 episode of the ORF III series SOKO Kitzbühel, and was part of the cast for 69 episodes of the ZDF programme Cologne P.D. in which she portrayed chief inspector Alexandra Gebhardt between October 2003 and 2007. Rapsch was the actor who portrayed the main role of Virginia Moll for 48 episodes of the ORF series OP ruft Dr. Bruckner from 1996 to 2009. She also played the role of Meike Triebich in 25 episodes of the series Die Lottosieger that was broadcast on ORF between 2009 and 2012.

In 2009 from 2011, Rapsch played Lena Moldar in Stolberg and was Pia in eight episodes of the 2009 series Geld.Macht.Liebe. She portrayed Ritcherin in a single 2010 episode of Der Winzerkönig and Doctor Ines Strahlhammer in one episode of Fast Forward in 2010. Rapsch was also Michael Niavarani's career woman Marianne Hubinger for 20 episodes of Dolce Vita & Co. She portrayed the alcoholic and drug-addicted mother Martha in the Polly Stenham play That Face – Szenen einer Familie at the Vorarlberger Landestheater in 2010, and made her final stage appearance in Peter Turrini's Campiello at the Theater in der Josefstadt until June 2011.

== Awards ==
She was voted the recipient of the Actor of the Year award by radio play directors with the ORF radio play editorial squad at the ORF radio play awards in 2002.

== Personal life ==
Rapsch was the mother of one child. On 14 December 2011, she died of lung cancer in Vienna.

== Legacy ==
Herbert Föttinger, the theatre director, calls Rapsch "an intelligent actress with courageous, strong characters and a particularly lovable, warm-hearted colleague." The director Leo Bauer said of Rapsch: "I got to know and appreciate Gundula Rapsch as an honestly playing, extremely warm-hearted and professionally working actress. If I could describe it in one word: a good one. That was two words now – and she deserves it."
