= Osterreich (disambiguation) =

Österreich is German for Austria.

Osterreich, Österreiche, Oesterreich, or variants, may also refer to:

- Österreich (surname) or Oesterreich
- Österreich (newspaper), a national daily newspaper of Austria based in Vienna
- Österreich I, an Austrian TV show
- Österreich II, an Austrian TV show
- Österreichring, a Formula 1 race track in Austria

== See also ==
- Austria (disambiguation)
