= Alexander Pschill =

Austrian actor (born 1970)

- Born: 13 June 1970 (age 55); Vienna, Austria
- Occupation: Actor
- Agent: Doris Fuhrmann Management
- Known for: Inspector Rex
- Website: www.alexanderpschill.at

Alexander Pschill (born 13 June 1970) is an Austrian actor who is best known for starring in Inspector Rex from 2002 to 2004.

== Biography ==
From 1989 to 1993, Alexander Pschill studied at the "Cornish College of the Arts Professional Acting Conservatory" in Seattle, Washington and graduated as Bachelor of Fine Arts. Besides playing the leading role in Peter Patzak's 1993 television production 1945, which started Pschill's career, the actor also starred in Der Sohn des Babymachers and Glück auf Raten (both 1995). From 2000 onwards, Pschill was a member of the cast of Julia – Eine ungewöhnliche Frau and from 2002 to 2004, he portrayed the main character Marc Hoffmann in Inspector Rex alongside Elke Winkens. He starred in the eighth, ninth and tenth season of the TV series (episodes 91 to 119).

Alexander Pschill's younger sister is singer Fawni.

== Filmography ==
Year	Title	Role	Director	Type	Ref.
1990	Temptation		Dayan Ballweg		
1991	Das Dorf an der Grenze	Loise Karnitscher	Fritz Lehner, Peter Patzak	TV movie	
1993	1945	Florian	Peter Patzak	TV movie	
1994	71 Fragments of a Chronology of Chance	Hanno	Michael Haneke	movie	
1995	Inspector Rex; German: Kommissar Rex	Seidl (Ep. "Blutspuren")	Udo Witte	TV series	
1995	Der Sohn des Babymachers	Paul	Susanne Zanke	TV movie	
1995	Glück auf Raten	Benjamin Glück	Peter Patzak	TV movie	
1996	That's all Johnny	Micky	Michael Pfeifenberger	short film	
1997	Beastie Girl	Dany	Johannes Fabrick	theatrical movie	
1997	Alles werden gut	Micky	Michael Pfeifenberger	short film	
1997/98	Aus heiterem Himmel	Rufus Goldberg (seasons 4 and 5)	Wolfgang Henschel, Dominikus Probst among others	TV series	
1999	Zwei Frauen, ein Mann und ein Baby (aka Ach Baby, ein Baby)	Sascha	Wolfgang Murnberger	TV movie	
2000	Thanksgivin', die nachtblaue Stadt	Micky	Michael Pfeifenberger	theatrical movie	
2000/01	Julia – Eine ungewöhnliche Frau	Dr. Anton Altmann (seasons 3 and 4)	Holger Barthel, Walter Bannert	TV series	
2001	Selbstbeschreibung	Younger G. S. Troller	Georg Stefan Troller	TV movie / documentary	
2002-04	Inspector Rex; German: Kommissar Rex	Marc Hoffmann (seasons 8, 9 and 10)	Hajo Gies, Gerald Liegel, Michi Riebl, Andreas Prochaska among others	TV series	
2003	Schatten	Mann	Markus Engel	short film	
2004	Der Bestseller – Wiener Blut	Schulz	Dirk Regel	TV movie	
2005	Lucía	Vincenzo	Pasquale Pozzessere	TV movie	
2005	T-Bone	Boyfriend	Florian Fessl	short film	
2005	Deli.Moment	Benjamin	Julia Frick	short film	
2007	SOKO Donau	Ingo Kock (Ep. "In Vino Veritas")	Erwin Keusch	TV series	
2007	Dienstag: "Schein"		Erik Etschel	short film	
2007	Facetten	Phillip	Erik Etschel	movie	
2008	Zwei Personen Film	Felix (Mann)	Markus Engel	short film	
2008	Reflection	Peter	Monika Farukuoye	short film	
2008-12	Die Lottosieger	Dr. Rüdiger Rössler	Leo Bauer	TV series	
2009	Rimini	Waiting Man	Peter Jaitz	movie	
2009	Der Winzerkönig	Dr. Klaus Rieder (Ep. "Die Krise")	Michi Riebl	TV series	
2009	Schnell ermittelt	Roland Czerny (Ep. "Laura Czerny")	Andreas Kopriva	TV series	
2010	Todespolka	Herbert Führer	Michael Pfeifenberger	theatrical movie	
2010	Die verrückte Welt der Ute Bock	Anrainer	Houchang Allahyari	biographical movie	
2010	Gut gegen Nordwind	Leo Leike	Michael Kreihsl	stage drama recording ("Kammerspiele Wien", 2009)	
2011	Der letzte Gast		Markus Engel	short film	
2011	Alle sieben Wellen	Leo Leike	Michael Kreihsl	stage drama recording ("Kammerspiele Wien", 2010)	
2011	Vatertag	Otto	Michi Riebl	TV movie	
2012	Vier Frauen und ein Todesfall	(one episode)	Andreas Kopriva	TV series	
2012	Janus	Dr. Leo Benedikt	Andreas Kopriva	TV series	

=== Music video appearances ===
- 2011: Kreisky - "Scheisse, Schauspieler"

=== As director ===
- 2004: Seven New Plays --- animated short film directed by Markus Engel and Alexander Pschill

== Stage ==
Year(s)	Title	Role	Director	Venue	Ref.
	Tolmezzo	Sängerknabe	Gerhard Willert	"Schauspielhaus Wien"	
1993	Die Amazonen	Theseus	Zeno Staner		
1994	Die Sache mit dem Heinrich	Heinrich	Alexander Strobele	"Theater der Jugend Wien"	
1995	Die Hochzeit des Figaro	Cherubin	Robert Meyer	"Festspiele Reichenau"	
1995/96	Oh Wunder	Lissardo	Beverly Blankenship	"Theater Drachengasse Wien"	
1996	Die Kuruzzen	Czoky	Erhard Pauer	"Volkstheater Wien Donaufestival"	
1996	Liebe Jelena	Pascha	Thomas Birkmeir	"Theater der Jugend Wien"	
1997	Das Mädl aus der Vorstadt	Herr Gigl	Robert Meyer	"Festspiele Reichenau"	
1998	Killing for Company	Frank	Thomas Birkmeir	"Studio Bühne Villach"	
1998/2000	Magic Afternoon	Charly	Herbert Sasse	"Schlossparktheater Berlin"	
1999	Nietzsche	Peter	Thomas Birkmeir	"Schlossparktheater Berlin"	
1999	Viel Lärm um Nichts	Claudio	Thomas Birkmeir	"Schlossparktheater Berlin"	
1999	Der Diener zweier Herren	Silvio	Marcello de Nardo	"Schlossparktheater Berlin"	
2000	Peer Gynt	Peer Gynt	Thomas Birkmeir	"Theater der Jugend Wien (Renaissancetheater)"	
2001	Liebelei	Fritz	Thomas Birkmeir	"Studio Bühne Villach"	
2004	Das weite Land	Otto von Aigner	Beverly Blankenship	"Festspiele Reichenau"	
2005	Das vierte Gebot	Martin	Herbert Föttinger	"Theater in der Josefstadt"	
2005	Die Drei Musketiere	Aramis / Herzog von Buckingham	Dominik Wilgenbus	"Theatersommer Haag"	
2006	Die Kaktusblüte	Igor	Reinhard Schwabenitzky	"Kammerspiele Wien"	
2007	Elling	Elling	Harald Posch	"Kammerspiele Wien"	
2007	Der Ruf des Lebens	Max	Franz Xaver Krötz	"Theater in der Josefstadt"	
2008	Unverhofft	Arnold	Hans Hollmann	"Theater in der Josefstadt"	
2008	Wonderful World	Max	Janusz Kica	"Kammerspiele Wien"	
2008	Floh im Ohr	Camille Chandebise	Hans-Ulrich Becker	"Theater in der Josefstadt"	
2009	Ein Sommernachtstraum	Puck	Josef Ernst Köpplinger	"Stadttheater Klagenfurt"	
2009	Gut gegen Nordwind^{1}	Leo Leike	Michael Kreihsl	"Kammerspiele Wien"	
2010	Moser	Wackel	Peter Wittenberg	"Theater in der Josefstadt"	
2010	Alle sieben Wellen^{2}	Leo Leike	Michael Kreihsl	"Kammerspiele Wien"	
2010	Kap Hoorn	Martin Solman	Igor Bauersima	"Theater in der Josefstadt"	
2010-2012/13	Ladies Night	Craig	Folke Braband	"Kammerspiele Wien"	
2011	Traumnovelle	Ferenc	Igor Bauersima	"Theater in der Josefstadt"	
2011-2012/13	Run For Your Wife	John Smith	Folke Braband	"Kammerspiele Wien"	
2012/13	Endlich Schluss	Der Mann	Herbert Föttinger	"Theater in der Josefstadt"	
2013	Venedig im Schnee		Folke Braband	"Kammerspiele Wien"	

== Awards ==
- 2001: Romy Shooting Star - Favorite New Actor

== Notes ==
^1 — based on Daniel Glattauer's novel of the same title, published in 2006
^2 — based on Daniel Glattauer's novel of the same title, published in 2009, sequel to Gut gegen Nordwind
