= Österreich (surname) =

Österreich or Oesterreich is the German name for Austria (literally "eastern realm") and may also be a surname. Notable people with the surname include:

- Georg Österreich (1664–1735), German Baroque composer
- Rolf Österreich (born 1952), former East German figure skater
- Romy Österreich (née Kermer, born 1956), former East German figure skater; partner and later wife of Rolf Österreich
- Traugott Konstantin Oesterreich (1880–1949), German religious psychologist and philosopher
- Walburga Oesterreich (1880–1961), American killer

== See also ==
- Österreicher (surname)
- Oestreich (surname)
