= Österreicher =

Oestreicher or Österreicher may refer to:

- A synonym to Silvaner (grape)
- Österreicher (surname)
- A person from Österreich (Austria)
