= Gundula =

Gundula may refer to:

- Gudula, seventh-century saint in Brabant
- Gundula Janowitz (b.1937) Austrian lyric soprano singer
- Gundula Krause (b.1966) German folk violinist
- Gundula or Gundi Busch (1935–2014) German figure skater and coach
- House of Gundula, Gundulić or Gondola, prominent in Ragusa/Dubrovnik in the 13th-17th centuries
- Gundula Rapsch (1963–2011), German actress
