= Peutz =

Peutz is a Dutch surname. Notable people with the surname include:

- Jan Peutz (1886–1957), Dutch internist
- Frits Peutz (1896–1974), Dutch architect

== See also ==
- Petz (disambiguation)
- Peutz–Jeghers syndrome
