= León Orlandianyi =

Austrian actor

León Orlandianyi (born 11 November 2001 in Vienna) is an Austrian actor.

== Life ==
León Orlandianyi was born in Vienna and spent his childhood with his mother in New York City, Panama, Mexico and Vienna. He speaks fluent English, German and Spanish. He graduated school with an International Baccalaureate in 2020 and completed his military service at the Austrian Armed Forces as part of the Gardebataillon in 2022.

== Acting ==
After initial acting experiences in a graduate film at the SAE Institute and Bibi Salehi's short film Dinnertime, he obtained an episode leading role in 2015 in the Austrian television series SOKO Donau. Various roles followed this in television productions, such as Die Kinder der Villa Emma, Die Stille danach, Soko Kitzbühel and Meiberger – Der Alpenkrimi, followed in 2019 by his first leading role in the German family horror film The Scary House (German: Das Schaurige Haus), also known as The Strange House. In 2020, he was cast once again in SOKO Donau under director Olaf Kreinsen.

He was nominated in the 2021 Romy Awards in the Most Popular Emerging Male Actor category.

On the St. Gilgen International School stage, he held a TED Talk in 2020 intending to motivate people to leave their comfort zone and draw strength from discomfort.

Critique Erik Piepenburg stated in The New York Times that 'Orlandianyi is especially good as the protective big brother' in the context of his main role in the movie The Strange House.

== Personal ==
Orlandianyi practices many different sports (including Krav Maga, surfing, urban exploration, calisthenics, acrobatics, and skiing) and is also an avid chess player. Together with his team, he has taken first place in the Vienna School Age Chess Championship twice as well as once in the Chess Provincial Championship.

== Filmography ==
- 2013: Dinnertime
- 2014: Die Ankunft
- 2015: SOKO Donau
- 2016: Die Kinder der Villa Emma
- 2016: Die Stille danach
- 2018: SOKO Kitzbühel
- 2018: Meiberger – Der Alpenkrimi
- 2019: The Scary House
- 2021: SOKO Donau – "Gastfreundschaft"
- 2021: Am Ende – Die Macht der Kränkung

== Awards and nominations ==
- 2021: Romyverleihung 2021 – nominated for the Romy Award as Most Popular Emerging Male Actor
