= Österreicher (surname) =

Österreicher or Oestreicher or is a German language surname with the literal meaning "One from Austria", "the Austrian" (German Österreich means "Austria"). 'Oe' is a common rendering of "Ö" whenever the diacritics are not available.

== Österreicher ==
- Karl Österreicher (1923–1995), Austrian conductor
- Johann Friedrich Oesterreicher (1771–1835), a Bishop of Eichstätt
- John M. Oesterreicher (1904–1993), an Austrian Roman Catholic theologian
- József Manes Österreicher (1756–1831), a Jewish Hungarian physician
- Richard Oesterreicher (1932–2023), Austrian musician
- Rudolf Österreicher (1881–1966), Austrian writer

== Oestreicher ==
- John Oestreicher (1936–2011), American politician and lawyer
- Rachel Oestreicher Bernheim (born 1943), a Jewish American human rights activist
- Robert T. Oestreicher (1894–1955), American businessman and 45th mayor of Columbus, Ohio

== See also ==
- Österreich (surname)
- Oestreich (surname)
- Ostriker (surname)
- Estereicher (Bosnian Austrians)
