= List of Austrian television series =

The following is a list of television series produced in Austria :

Title	German wiki	Genre	Year(s)	Episodes	Seasons	Refs
11er Haus	11er Haus	Comedy	2005	5		
Die 4 da	Die 4 da	Satire	2007–2008	21	2	
8 x 45	8 × 45	Drama, Horror, Mystery	2005	8		
Die Abenteuer des braven Soldaten Schwejk	Die Abenteuer des braven Soldaten Schwejk	Comedy, Adventure	1972–1977	13	2	
Alisa – Folge deinem Herzen	Hanna – Folge deinem Herzen	Telenovela, Drama	2009–2010	370	2	
Die Alpensaga	Die Alpensaga	Drama	1976–1980	6		
Altes Geld	Altes Geld	Drama	2015	8	1	
Am Dam Des	Am dam des	Kindergarten	1975–1997	3986		
Bianca – Wege zum Glück	Bianca – Wege zum Glück	Telenovela	2004–2005	224		
Doctor's Diary	Doctor's Diary	Comedy, hospital series	2008–2011	24	3	
Dolce Vita & Co	Dolce Vita & Co	Drama	2000–2002	20	2	
Echt fett	Echt fett	Comedy	2003–2007	34	4	
Ein echter Wiener geht nicht unter	Ein echter Wiener geht nicht unter	Drama	1975–1979	24		
Eine Couch für alle	Eine Couch für alle	Comedy	2010	4		
Eurocops	Eurocops	Crime	1988–1993	70	6	
Familie Leitner	Familie Leitner	Soap	1958-1967	100		
Familie Merian	Familie Merian	Soap	1980–1985, 1993	36		
Familie Petz	Familie Petz	Animals (Child)		198		
Die Gipfelzipfler	Die Gipfelzipfler	Comedy (live)	Since 2010	10		
Hallo – Hotel Sacher ... Portier!	Hallo – Hotel Sacher ... Portier!	Drama	1973–1975	26		
Hand aufs Herz	Hand aufs Herz	Soap / Telenovela	2010–2011	234		
Hanna – Folge deinem Herzen	Hanna – Folge deinem Herzen	Telenovela, Drama	2009–2010	370	2	
Julia – Eine ungewöhnliche Frau	Julia – Eine ungewöhnliche Frau	Telenovela	1999–2003	65	5	
Julia – Wege zum Glück	Julia – Wege zum Glück	Telenovela	2005–2008	789	4	
Kaisermühlen Blues	Kaisermühlen Blues	Comedy Drama	1992–2000	64		
Das kleine Haus	Das kleine Haus	Children	1969–1975			
Die Knickerbocker-Bande	Die Knickerbocker-Bande	Children Adventure	1997	14	1	
Inspector Rex	Kommissar Rex	Crime	1994–2004, 2007–2014	214	18	
Kottan ermittelt	Kottan ermittelt	Crime, Satire	1976–1983	19	6	
Kulturkiste	Kulturkiste	Travel	2002-	6		
Laura und Luis	Laura und Luis	Christmas	1989	6	1	
Tessa – Leben für die Liebe	Leben für die Liebe	Telenovela	2005–2006	125		
Der Leihopa	Der Leihopa	Entertainment	1985–1989	26		
Lena – Liebe meines Lebens	Lena – Liebe meines Lebens	Telenovela, Drama	2010–2011	180	1	
Die liebe Familie	Die liebe Familie	Comedy (Live)	1980–1993 / 2007	398	9	
Die Lottosieger	Die Lottosieger	Comedy	2009–2012	30	3	
Die Lugners	Die Lugners	Reality-TV, Doku-Soap	since 2003	100	12	
MA 2412	MA 2412	Sitcom	1998–2002	34	4	
Mario	Mario	Adventure (Children)	1963	12		
Medicopter 117 – Jedes Leben zählt	Medicopter 117 – Jedes Leben zählt	Action, Drama	1997–2007	81	7	
Mitten im 8en	Mitten im 8en	Daily Soap, Dramedy	2007	56		
Mozart und Meisel	Mozart und Meisel	Comedy Drama	1987	6		
Die Neue – Eine Frau mit Kaliber	Die Neue – Eine Frau mit Kaliber	Crime	1998	13		
Novotny & Maroudi – Zahngötter in Weiß	Novotny & Maroudi – Zahngötter in Weiß	Sitcom	2004–2007	17	2	
Oben ohne	Oben ohne	Family comedy	2006–2011	22	4	
Oberinspektor Marek	Oberinspektor Marek	Crime	1963–1970	8		
Österreich I	Österreich I	Documentary	1989	12		
Österreich II	Österreich II	Documentary	1981–1995	32		
Österreichs schlechtester Autofahrer	Österreichs schlechtester Autofahrer	Show	2007	8		
Ringstraßenpalais	Ringstraßenpalais	Drama	1980–1986	27	3	
Saugut	Saugut	Children	2008–?			
Schlawiner	Schlawiner	Comedy, Mockumentary	2009–2010, 2012–2013	27	3	
Ein Schloß am Wörthersee	Ein Schloß am Wörthersee	Comedy, Drama	1990–1993	34	3	
Schlosshotel Orth	Schlosshotel Orth	Family	1996–2005	144		
Fast Forward	Schnell ermittelt	Crime, Drama	2009–2012, 2017–	60	6	
SOKO Donau	SOKO Donau	Crime	From 2005	234	16	
SOKO Kitzbühel	SOKO Kitzbühel	Crime	2001–2021	263	20	
Der Sonne entgegen	Der Sonne entgegen	Comedy	1985	12	2	
Stockinger	Stockinger	Crime	1996	14	1	
Tatort	Tatort	Crime	Since 1970	1204		
Tohuwabohu	Tohuwabohu	Cabaret	1990–1998	58	8	
Tom Turbo	Tom Turbo	Crime, Children, Fantasy	Since 1993	407		
Trautmann	Trautmann	Crime	2000–2008	10		
Tschuschen:power	Tschuschen:power	Child, Comedy	2007–2008	5	1	
Verschollen	Verschollen	Soap, Adventure	2004–2005	29		
Vier Frauen und ein Todesfall	Vier Frauen und ein Todesfall	Crime	2004–2008, 2011–2020	66	9	
Waldheimat	Waldheimat	Child/Youth Historical	1983–1984	26	2	
WEGA – Die Spezialeinheit der Polizei	WEGA – Die Spezialeinheit der Polizei	Documentary	2011	9		
Weltberühmt in Österreich – 50 Jahre Austropop	Weltberühmt in Österreich – 50 Jahre Austropop	Documentary	2006–2008, 2011	10+	3	
Wenn das die Nachbarn wüßten	Wenn das die Nachbarn wüßten	Family	1990–1991	12		
Wiener Blut – Die 3 von 144	Wiener Blut – Die 3 von 144	Documentary	2008	4		
Der wilde Gärtner	Der wilde Gärtner	Comedy, Infotainment	2009	11	1	
Der Winzerkönig	Der Winzerkönig	Family	2005–2009	39	3	
WWW	WWW (Kindersendung)	Children News	From 2008			
