= Ohne Maulkorb =

Austrian children's TV series

Ohne Maulkorb (Without a Muzzle) was an Austrian teenager and youth TV series produced by Österreichischer Rundfunk that aired from 9 April 1967 until 1987 on ORF 2. It was originally a studio talk show that subsequently included current reports of the political and cultural affairs and youth culture. In the early 1980s, for instance, it discussed the newly emerging DJ-ing phenomenon in New York City.

== Content ==
The broadcasts included topics such as squatters, anti-nuclear activism (construction of a nuclear reactor in Zwentendorf was prevented by a referendum) and politically provocative art. At that time the high proportion of "Langhaaradn" (long-haired), that were able to express themselves openly in this show was something of a scandal. Artist portraits included "20 Stunden mit Patti Smith" (20 hours with Patti Smith) about Patti Smith at the beginning of her career. The show provided detailed concert footage such as Ian Anderson of Jethro Tull, or Frank Zappa in Vienna, Kraftwerk performing live in 1981, as well as the Kinks in the Viennese Sofiensäle in 1978, Bob Dylan's "Hard Rain" Concert (Fort Collins, Colorado, 1976). Footage of the anarchists of Drahdiwaberl) and video clips that were absent from mainstream coverage. There is also some live footage from Manfred Mann's Earth Band performing with the renewed 1979 lineup. There they play many of their famous hits without Blinded by the Light (Manfred Mann's Earth Band cover song).

The moderators of Ohne Maulkorb were editors Rudi Dolezal, Hannes Rossacher, Ernst Grandits, Vera Russwurm, Helmut Frodl, Werner Fitzthum, Karin Resetarits (earlier under her birth name, Karin Müller), and later her husband Peter Resetarits (1981-1987) and Martina Rupp (since 1986). From 1981 to 1985 Marald Sicheritz also served as an editor.

Its successor program was the show X-Large, which was originally moderated by Barbara Stöckl in 1987, and later by Christian Clerici and Arabella Kiesbauer.
