= Hannes Rossacher =

Austrian film director (born 1952)

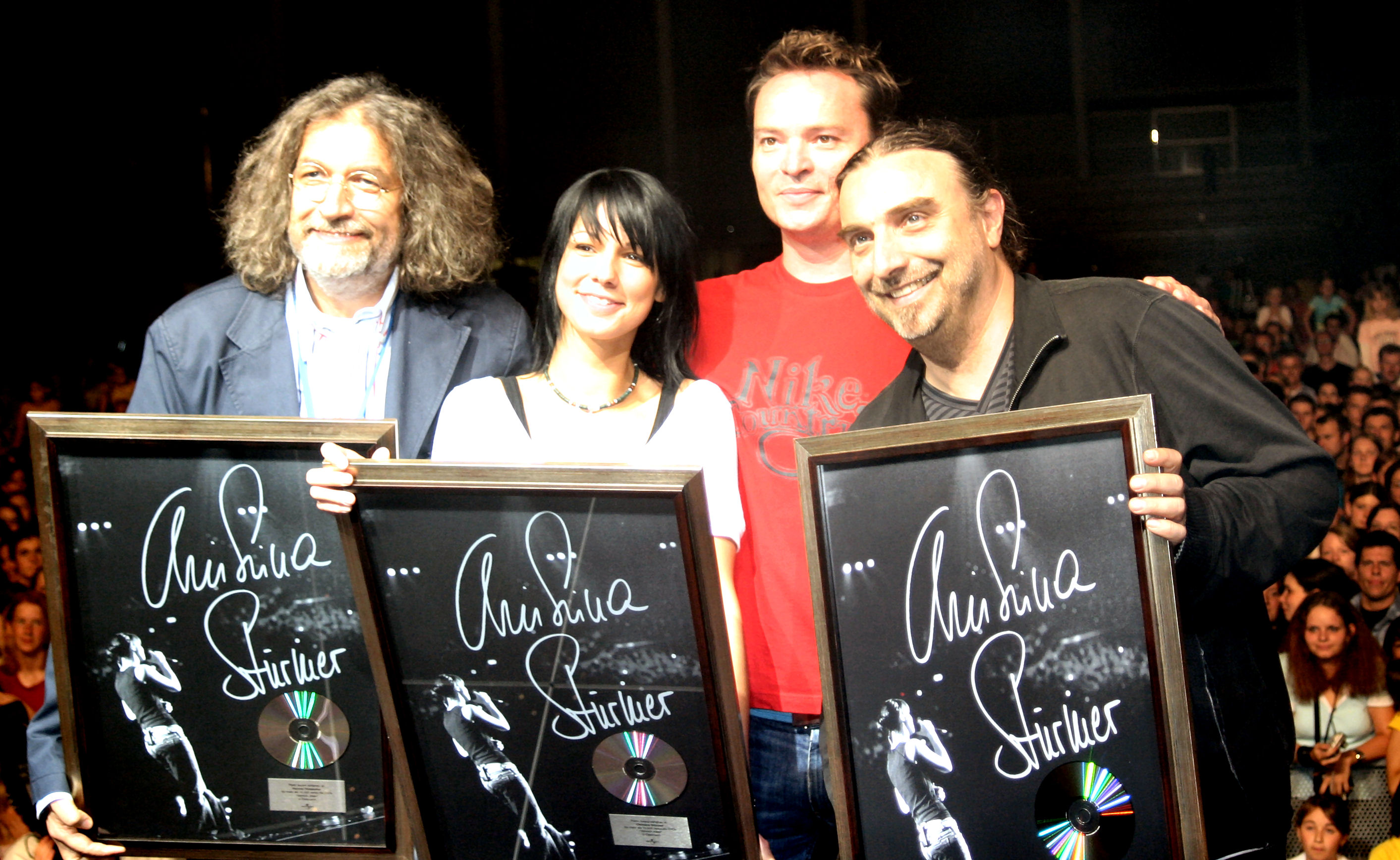
2005, from left to right: Hannes Rossacher, Christina Stürmer, Hannes Eder, and Rudi Dolezal

Hannes Rossacher (born 16 October 1952, Steyr) is an Austrian film director and film producer.

Rossacher has worked with Rudi Dolezal since 1976 in their production company DoRo Productions. His contributions to the ORF youth program "Ohne Maulkorb" were among his first major assignments. With the bankruptcy of DoRo Productions in 2003, Dolezal and Rossacher have separated and went their own ways. In 2008, Rossacher, together with Dolezal, received a Romy award for the documentary series Weltberühmt in Österreich – 50 Jahre Austropop.
