= Rudi Dolezal =

Austrian film producer and film director

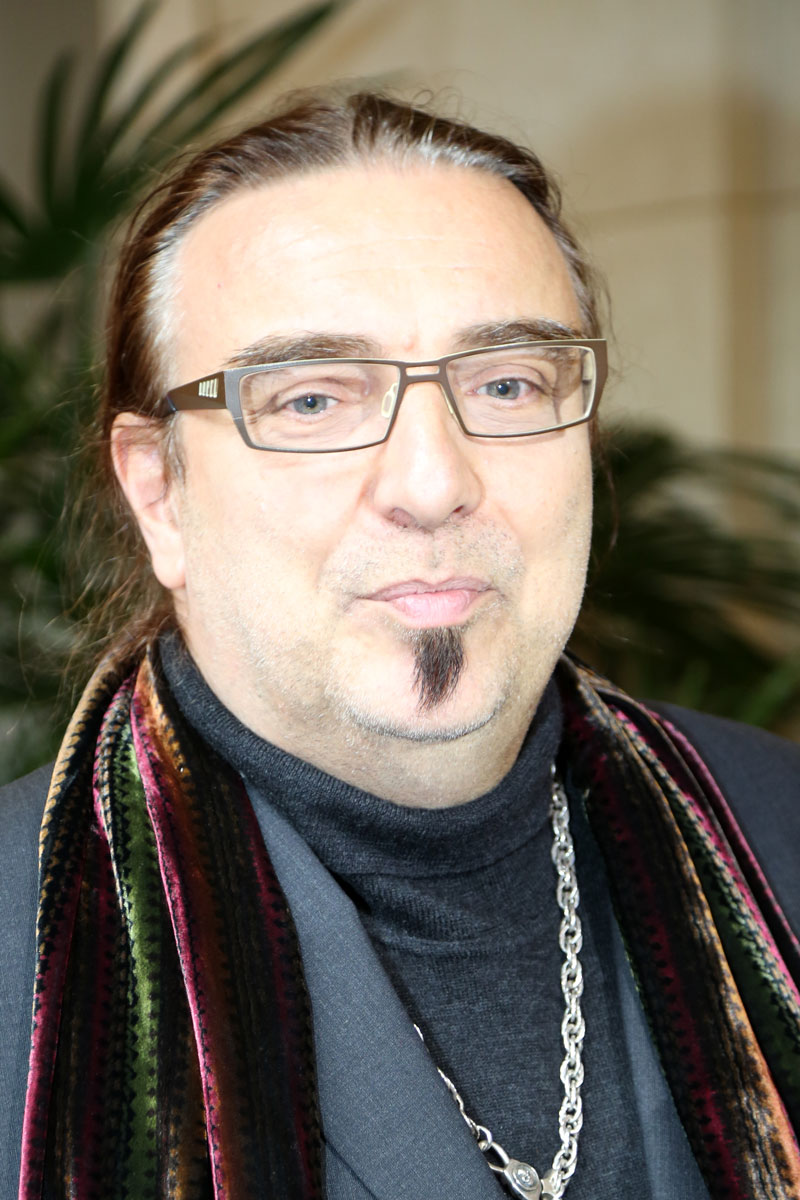
- Dolezal in 2013
- Born: 5 February 1958 (age 68); Vienna, Austria
- Occupations: Film director, film producer
- Children: 2
- Awards: Decoration of Honour for Services to the Republic of Austria; Decoration of Honour for Services to the Province of Vienna

Rudi Dolezal (Slovene: Doležal, born 5 February 1958) is an Austrian film producer and film director best known for his music videos. He has directed and produced videos for artists such as Queen, Tom Waits, the Rolling Stones, Frank Zappa, David Bowie, Michael Jackson, Bruce Springsteen, Sandra Cretu, and Whitney Houston.

For his work in the music industry, Dolezal was nominated for two Grammy Awards. He is the recipient of three Romy Awards and two Rose d'Ors. Among his best known works are the documentary Freddie Mercury – The Untold Story (2000), which earned him his second Grammy Award nomination, the documentary TV series Weltberühmt in Österreich – 50 Jahre Austropop (2006), and Whitney: Can I Be Me (2017), a documentary film co-directed by Dolezal and created from more than one hundred hours of footage filmed by Dolezal in 1999.

== Early life ==
Dolezal was born in Vienna on 5 February 1958. He grew up in Vienna's 19th district. He was trained in classical music, but always had a passion for rock 'n' roll. After graduating from high school, Dolezal studied journalism, political science and law.

He started to work in the film industry at 17. In the 1970s he worked as a TV reporter in his native Vienna. He worked as a freelancer for ORF and was a journalist for "Kurier", "Wiener" and "Basta".

== Career ==
Dolezal has worked together with Hannes Rossacher since 1976 as part of their production company DoRo Productions as a producer and director, first for ORF, and then for ARD and ZDF and provided contributions for youth and music programs. With the founding of their own production company, they specialized in the music market and made music videos for national and international musicians. They also created portraits and documentaries. In 2003, the company went bankrupt, and later Rossacher and Dolezal separated and went their own way. At the time, Dolezal had already become the father of his two sons and lived in Purkersdorf near Vienna.

Together with Rossacher, Dolezal was involved in the content development of Premiere and VIVA. After MTV UK did not want to air the music videos of Marius Müller-Westernhagen because he sang in German, Dolezal and Rossacher planned the German music TV channel VIVA for three years, which started airing in December 1993. Dolezal has won numerous awards in the film, television and music sectors.

Dolezal has filmed documentaries on Freddie Mercury, including Lover of Life, Singer of Songs. He also produced music videos for Falco, such as the music video for "Rock Me Amadeus". Since 2015, he has hosted a music documentary series called Dolezal Backstage on Servus TV, in which he tells stories of his life, illustrated with archive footage, and talks about his encounters with music greats such as Michael Jackson, Bruce Springsteen, Frank Zappa, The Rolling Stones, and others. Dolezal worked on dozens of music videos for Queen, Tom Waits, Rolling Stones, Frank Zappa, and Whitney Houston.

=== Collaboration with Queen ===
Dolezal and Mercury first met when the Austrian director and film producer was working as a reporter for a German television, during an interview with the band. After the interview, he made a "tongue-in-cheek remark", telling Mercury to give him a call if he needed a good director for his next videos. Mercury's manager did call Dolezal in 1985, and asked him if he could shoot the music video for "One Vision", Queen's new single. It was the first collaboration of a "fruitful relationship between Dolezal and the band".

About Mercury Dolezal said:

Freddie and I developed a language together. He was very, very, fast. He was very intelligent, very clever, and you had to be always on your toes. He was very impatient. He wasn't even finishing telling you what he wanted, but he wanted it that moment!

Dolezal also said that Mercury was very diligent: "If I had a shoot where I said, 'Freddie, you have to get up at 5 a.m. because I want to have the sun going up behind you,' he was there 5 a.m.". He and Mercury developed a strong friendship.

Dolezal knew that Mercury was not well when he came to him to shoot the music video to "These Are the Days of Our Lives". He said Mercury knew it was the last time he would be in front of a camera. Although filmed in color, Dolezal decided to render the video in black and white, in a "desperate attempt to conceal Mercury's physical deterioration". The Queen's frontman had not yet reveled his illness to the public, nor did he talk about it except within a restricted inner circle of friends. The friends "did their best to carry on as normal". Dolezal stated that his friend didn't want any special treatment from them, and carried the disease bravely.

Dolezal paid tribute to Mercury with his Freddie Mercury: The Untold Story, a Grammy-nominated documentary released in 2000. It was Dolezal's second Grammy Award nomination.

=== Other works in the music industry ===
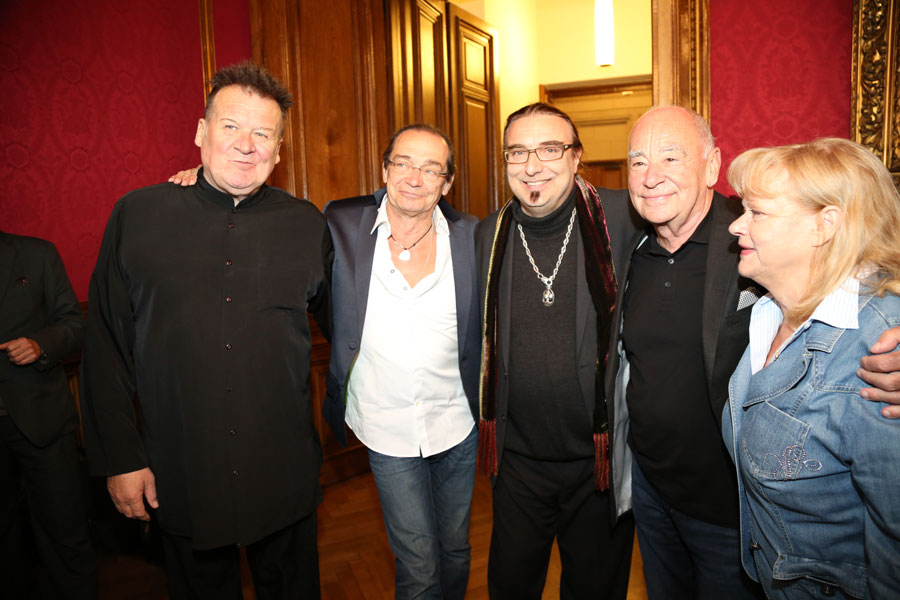
Dolezal with Wilfried, Kolonovits, Stricker and Marianne Mendt in 2013

In the music industry, Dolezal worked on many videos for, among others, Tom Waits, Rolling Stones, Frank Zappa, David Bowie, Bruce Springsteen and Whitney Houston; in addition to his work with Queen.

In 1999, Whitney Houston was at the peak of her career since "The Bodyguard", with her album My Love Is Your Love on the hot charts. While preparing her world tour, she gave full access to Dolezal to trail her, "wanting to tell her story at a time when speculation about her life behind the scenes was intensifying." Dolezal was finishing a music video for Houston when the singer traveled to Austria to give her "final approval". Since Houston was "looking to kill some time after they were done", Dolezal showed her some of his other work. He showed her his Freddie Mercury: The Untold Story, and a documentary he made for the Rolling Stones. While watching the latter she told Dolezal, halfway through the documentary, "Rudi, I want you to do a film like this about me".

Interviews, revealing moments with Houston and her family in the backstage and onstage performances were all filmed, and the documentary was set to be released under the title Whitney Close Up. However, the work was not released due to the singer's struggle with substance abuse that led to her death. After reading the headlines about she being sent home from the Academy Awards because of cocaine addiction, Dolezal called Houston, and then came to her house. He proposed her to talk about the problem in the documentary, to add a short interview, to be filmed even there, in her apartment, where the singer would mention her drug problem, but Houston refused and Dolezal left.

The more than one hundred hours of footage remained in obscurity for twenty years, until they were released in Whitney: Can I Be Me, co-directed by Dolezal, in 2017. The documentary was critically acclaimed.

Dolezal has received three Romy awards, most recently in 2008 – together with Rossacher – for the documentary series Weltberühmt in Österreich – 50 Jahre Austropop.

== Personal life ==
Dolezal has two children, Benny and Ruby, with former wife Martina Pauser. In late 2019, he was in a relationship with Austrian television presenter Martina Reuter. However, they split the next winter, just 20 days after their engagement.

He has a second home in Miami Beach, where he has been living since 2006.

== Awards and nominations ==
Year	Award	Category	Project	Result	Ref.
2017	Romy Award	Best TV Documentary	Falco – Die ultimative Doku	Nominated	
2008	Romy Award	Best Documentary	Weltberühmt in Österreich – 50 Jahre Austropop	Won	
2003	Grimme-Preis	Outstanding Individual Achievement (Note: Shared with Hannes Rossacher)	Freddie Mercury – The Untold Story; Music Planet 2Nite	Nominated	
2002	Romy Award	Best Programming Idea	Ambros: 25 Jahre	Won	
2001	Rose d'Or	Prix Special	Die Akte Joel	Won	
2001	Rose d'Or	Golden Rose of Montreux	Freddie Mercury – The Untold Story	Won	
2001	Grammy Awards	Best Long Form Music Video	Freddie Mercury – The Untold Story	Nominated	
1993	Grammy Awards	Best Long Form Music Video	Miles & Quincy Live at Montreux	Nominated	
1997	Romy Award	Best Director	Ambros: 25 Jahre	Won	
