= Waldheimat =

Television series

- Based on: Peter Rosegger
- Country of origin: Austria
- No. of episodes: 26

Production
- Running time: 25 minutes

Original release
- Release: December 27, 1983

Waldheimat is an Austrian television series.

== See also ==
- List of Austrian television series
