= Schlawiner =

- Created by: Breitwandfilm
- Starring: Michael Ostrowski as Manu Singer; Angelika Niedetzky as Maia (Barbara) Geiger; Alexander Jagsch as Basti Bacher; Gregor Seberg as Engelbert; Suse Lichtenberger as Gundi Bacher; Gerald Votava as Walter Fritschek; Christian Dolezal as Andreas; Werner Wultsch as Dr. Geiger; Tobias Ofenbauer as Nikolaus; Michael Smulik as Jesus Heinrich Rosenkranz; Lukas Knoll as Berti; Christiane Blumhoff as Friederike; Doris Hindinger as Irina; Marlene Morreis as Stella; Martin Leutgeb as neighbour; Martin Oberhauser as Norbert; Veronika von Quast as Feodora Schludrotzky; Sabrina White als Renata; Werner Brix as electrician; Maximilian Schafroth as Kai Boxheimer
- Country of origin: Austria
- No. of seasons: 2
- No. of episodes: 23

Original release
- Release: 2009

Schlawiner is an Austrian television series, which since 2010 is produced by Breitwandfilm, along with ORF and Bayerischer Rundfunk. It is a mix of comedy and mockumentary. Directed by Paul Harather, who became known for his films Cappuccino Melange and Indien in the 1990s. The first season was shot between June 2009 and November 2010. The next season was made in the summer of 2012. Participating actors and actresses include Marlene Morreis.

== See also ==
- List of Austrian television series
