= Novotny & Maroudi – Zahngötter in Weiß =

- Starring: Andreas Vitásek; Michael Niavarani
- Country of origin: Austria
- No. of seasons: 2

Production
- Running time: 23 minutes

Novotny & Maroudi – Zahngötter in Weiß is an Austrian television series about two middle-aged dentists.

== See also ==
- List of Austrian television series
