= Wiener Blut – Die 3 von 144 =

- Genre: Documentary
- Country of origin: Austria
- Original language: German
- No. of episodes: 4

Production
- Producer: mediafilm
- Running time: 25 minutes

Original release
- Network: ORF eins
- Release: 2 July 2008 – 2008

Wiener Blut – Die 3 von 144 is a four-part documentary series about ambulance station 6 of the Vienna Professional Rescue Service. The camera follows three paramedics not only on their calls, but also delves into their private lives. The documentary has been criticized by experts, who argue that the paramedics are primarily known for their Viennese charm and hardly for their medical knowledge or procedures.

== See also ==
- List of Austrian television series
