= Marlene Morreis =

Austrian actress

Marlene Morreis (born 21 December 1976 in Schärding, Upper Austria, is an Austrian actress.

== Life and career ==
Marlene Morreis was born in 1976 in Schärding in Upper Austria. She attended a rural primary school, then she went to the grammar school and successfully completed her Matura (A Levels). She then began studying Nordic philology in Munich. After spending a year abroad in Linköping, Sweden and returning to Munich, she was hired by Klaus Lemke in 2002 as a student waitress and doorkeeper at The Atomic Café in Munich for a role in the feature film Running Out of Cool. She then performed on stage at the Munich Lustspielhaus and then took a six-month sabbatical in Alaska, where she worked in a bar.

In 2005, Morreis began her acting training at The New School for Drama in New York City, which she graduated in 2008 with a Master of Fine Arts.

From 2008, Morreis worked in numerous independent productions in the USA, until 2010 when her artist's visa for a leading role in an episode expired. So, in 2011, she returned to Munich. Here she acted in films and television productions such as Don't You Believe It! or Der Alte (The Old Fox). In the television series Schafkopf - A bissel was geht immer, which was broadcast on ZDF in November 2012, she played the starring role for the first time.

In 2015, she played the leading role in the four-part ZDF comedy series Komm schon!. In 2020, Morreis starred alongside Hannelore Elsner in their last film Lang lebe die Königin ("Long Live the Queen") as her daughter and TV host, Nina Just.

Marlene Morreis speaks High German, Bavarian and Austrian dialects. She is also fluent in American and in British English and in Swedish. She lives in Munich.

== Filmography (selection) ==
- 2002: Running Out of Cool
- 2009: The Greims
- 2010: Hungry Henrieta
- 2011: Stags
- 2012: One Bedroom
- 2012: Schafkopf – A bissel was geht immer (TV series, 6 episodes)
- 2012: Don't You Believe It!
- 2012: Kommissarin Lucas – Die sieben Gesichter der Furcht
- 2012: Der Alte – Die Zeugin
- 2012–2013: Schlawiner (TV series)
- 2013: Wer hat Angst vorm weißen Mann?
- 2013: Polizeiruf 110: Kinderparadies
- 2014: Meine Mutter, meine Männer
- 2014: Die Frau aus dem Moor
- 2014: Die Rosenheim-Cops – a call centre under suspicion
- 2015: Ein Sommer in Masuren
- 2015: Komm schon! (TV series)
- 2015–2020: Schwarzach 23 (film series)
  - 2015: Schwarzach 23 und die Hand des Todes
  - 2016: Schwarzach 23 und die Jagd nach dem Mordsfinger
  - 2018: Schwarzach 23 und der Schädel des Saatans
  - 2020: Schwarzach 23 und das mörderische Ich
- 2016: Unser Traum von Kanada: Sowas wie Familie
- 2016: Der mit dem Schlag
- 2015: Mein Schwiegervater, der Stinkstiefel
- 2016: Heiter bis tödlich: München 7 (TV series)
- 2016: Liebe bis in den Mord – an Alpine thriller
- 2016: Polizeiruf 110: Sumpfgebiete
- 2016: Inspektor Jury spielt Katz und Maus
- 2016: Der mit dem Schlag
- 2016: Hubert und Staller (TV series)
- 2017: Der Bergdoktor
- 2017: Jella jagt das Glück
- 2017: Wenn Frauen ausziehen
- 2017: Tatort: Die Liebe, ein seltsames Spiel
- 2018: Matula – Der Schatten des Berges
- 2018: Wackersdorf
- 2018: Die Chefin – a village beauty
- 2018: Labaule & Erben
- 2019: Curling for Eisenstadt
- 2020: Lang lebe die Königin
- 2020: Pohlmann und die Zeit der Wünsche
- 2020: Kinder und andere Baustellen
- 2021: An seiner Seite
- 2021: Danish crime story: Rauhnächte (film series)
- 2022: Nachricht von Mama (TV series)
