= Eine Couch für alle =

- Country of origin: Austria

Original release
- Network: Servus TV
- Release: November 24, 2010

Eine Couch für alle is an Austrian television series.

== See also ==
- List of Austrian television series
