= WWW (TV series) =

WWW is an Austrian children's television series.

== See also ==
- List of Austrian television series
