= Die Knickerbocker-Bande (TV series) =

Austrian television series

- Country of origin: Austria
- No. of seasons: 1
- No. of episodes: 12

Die Knickerbocker-Bande is an Austrian television series.

== See also ==
- List of Austrian television series
