= Ostriker =

Ostriker is a surname. Notable people with this name include:

- Alicia Ostriker (born 1937), American poet, married to Jeremiah, mother of Eve
- David M. Ostriker (born 1947), American documentary filmmaker, winner of 2003 Donald Brittain Award, brother of Jeremiah
- Eve Ostriker (born 1965), American astrophysicist, daughter of Alicia and Jeremiah
- Jeremiah P. Ostriker (1937–2025), American astrophysicist, married to Alicia, father of Eve, brother of David
- Jon Ostriker, American correspondence chess player, ICCF U.S.A. grandmaster
- Marilyn Ostriker (1929-2014), American Ophthalmologist, married to Paul, mother of Glenn
- Paul Ostriker (1926-2017), American Ophthalmologist, married to Marilyn, father of Glenn
- Glenn Ostriker, American Ophthalmologist

== See also ==
- 12146 Ostriker, asteroid named for Jeremiah
- Ostriker–Peebles criterion for formation of barred galaxies, named after Jeremiah
- Ostriker–Vishniac effect, distortion of cosmic background, named after Jeremiah
- Österreicher (surname)
