= Österreichs schlechtester Autofahrer =

- Country of origin: Austria

Österreichs schlechtester Autofahrer ("Austria's Worst Driver") is an Austrian television series.

== See also ==
- List of Austrian television series
