= Die Gipfelzipfler =

- Country of origin: Austria
- No. of episodes: 10

Original release
- Network: ORF eins
- Release: April 1, 2010

Die Gipfelzipfler is an Austrian television series.

== See also ==
- List of Austrian television series
