= Die 4 da =

- Country of origin: Austria
- No. of seasons: 2

Original release
- Release: 22 February 2007 – 29 May 2008

Die 4 da is an Austrian television series.

== See also ==
- List of Austrian television series
