= Das kleine Haus =

- Country of origin: Austria

Das kleine Haus is an Austrian television series.

== See also ==
- List of Austrian television series
