= Familie Leitner =

- Country of origin: Austria

Production
- Running time: 30 minutes

Original release
- Network: ORF
- Release: September 29, 1958

Familie Leitner is an Austrian television series that ran monthly for 100 episodes on ORF from September 1958 to 1967. It was produced by Erich Neuberg and directed by Otto Schenck. Hans Schubert and Fritz Eckhardt published a book on the show in 1963.

It centred around the everyday lives of the Leitner family, with Mr and Mrs Leitner played by Erich Nikowits and Friedl Czepa respectively. Mr Leitner was a grumpy but loving husband and a small businessman. A son and daughter in law were played by Alfred Böhm and Senta Wengraf.

== Cast ==
- Alfred Böhm as son-in-law Walter Riegler)
- Rudolf Carl (Haberl)
- Friedl Czepa as Mama Leitner
- Gertraud Jesserer - as Gerda (initially portrayed by Heidelinde Weis)
- Franz Messner as Dr. Otto Sedelmayer
- Renee Michaelis as Maria
- Dorothea Neff as Aunt Frieda
- Erich Nikowitz as Papa Leitner
- Rudolf Strobl as Karl
- Peter Weck as Harry Stagl
- Senta Wengraf as daughter-in-law Ilse
- Guido Wieland as Uncle
- Hilde Sochor

== See also ==
- List of Austrian television series
