= Der wilde Gärtner =

- Country of origin: Austria
- No. of episodes: 11

Production
- Running time: 40 minutes

Der wilde Gärtner is an Austrian television series.

== See also ==
- List of Austrian television series
