= Petz (disambiguation) =

Petz is a 1990s series of games in which the player has virtual pets. It may also refer to:

== People ==
- Anton von Petz (1819–1885), Austrian Navy vice admiral
- Dénes Petz (1953–2018), Hungarian physicist
- Johann Christoph Pez or Petz (1664–1716), German musician, composer and Kapellmeister
- Manfred Petz (born 1961), German former football goalkeeper
- Mat Petz (born 1977), Canadian football player

== Media ==
- a family of bears in Familie Petz, an Austrian television programme
- Schlern (also known as Petz), summit in South Tyrol
