= Austria (surname) =

Austria is a surname. Notable people with the surname include:

- Alli Austria (born 1990), Filipino basketball player
- Amy Austria (born 1961), Filipina actress
- Leo Austria (born 1958), Filipino basketball player and coach
- Steve Austria (born 1958), American politician
