= MV APL Austria =

MV APL Austria is a Liberian-registered container ship. The ship is owned by Marugame Kisen Kaisha and operated by American President Lines (APL).

== Description ==
APL Austria is a post-Panamax container ship measuring 71,867 gross tonnage (GT) with a capacity of 6,350 TEU. She is a type Imabari 6350 container ship constructed in 2007 at the Koyo Dockyard Co. Ltd Shipyard in Mihara, Japan.

== 2017 fire ==
On February 13, 2017, APL Austria caught fire near the South African coast, 20 kilometres (12 mi) south of Cape St. Francis. The ship was on its voyage from European ports to Asian ports with 8,235 containers when a fire broke out in the ship's middle cargo hold. Four non-essential crew members evacuated from the ship, one evacuee suffered a leg injury and was treated on shore. The fire took more than three days to bring under control and resulted in more than 40 feet (12 m) of water filling hold number 4. She was subsequently repaired and returned to service.
