= Familie Petz =

- Genre: Children
- Country of origin: Austria

Original release
- Release: 1969 – 1990

Familie Petz was an Austrian television series from 1969 to 1990.

The Petz family of bears was the focus of 198 episodes of “Betthupferls” by the Urania puppet theater in Vienna, each of which was only a few minutes long. The family consists of little Pezi, grandfather, father and mother Petz. They live in a small house in Felsental. Father Petz works in the circus in Oberbärenstadt and only comes home on weekends. Pezi experiences many adventures with his friend Fips, a mouse, Hoppl the rabbit, Minki the cat, Dagobert the dragon and Meckerle the goat. Pezi's exclamation "Krawuzi-Kapuzi!" occurs in many episodes. The programs are no longer shown, but Pezi is still active as the companion of Punch and Judy.

The title melody of the "Family Petz" is the musette in D major (BWV Anh. 126) from the music booklet for Anna Magdalena Bach by Johann Sebastian Bach in the arrangement by Wendy Carlos.

== See also ==
- List of Austrian television series
