= Austra =

Austra may refer to:

- Austra, Norway, an island between Trøndelag and Nordland counties
- Austra (band), a Canadian musical group
- Austra (given name)
