= Richard Oesterreicher =

Austrian conductor and jazz musician (1932–2023)

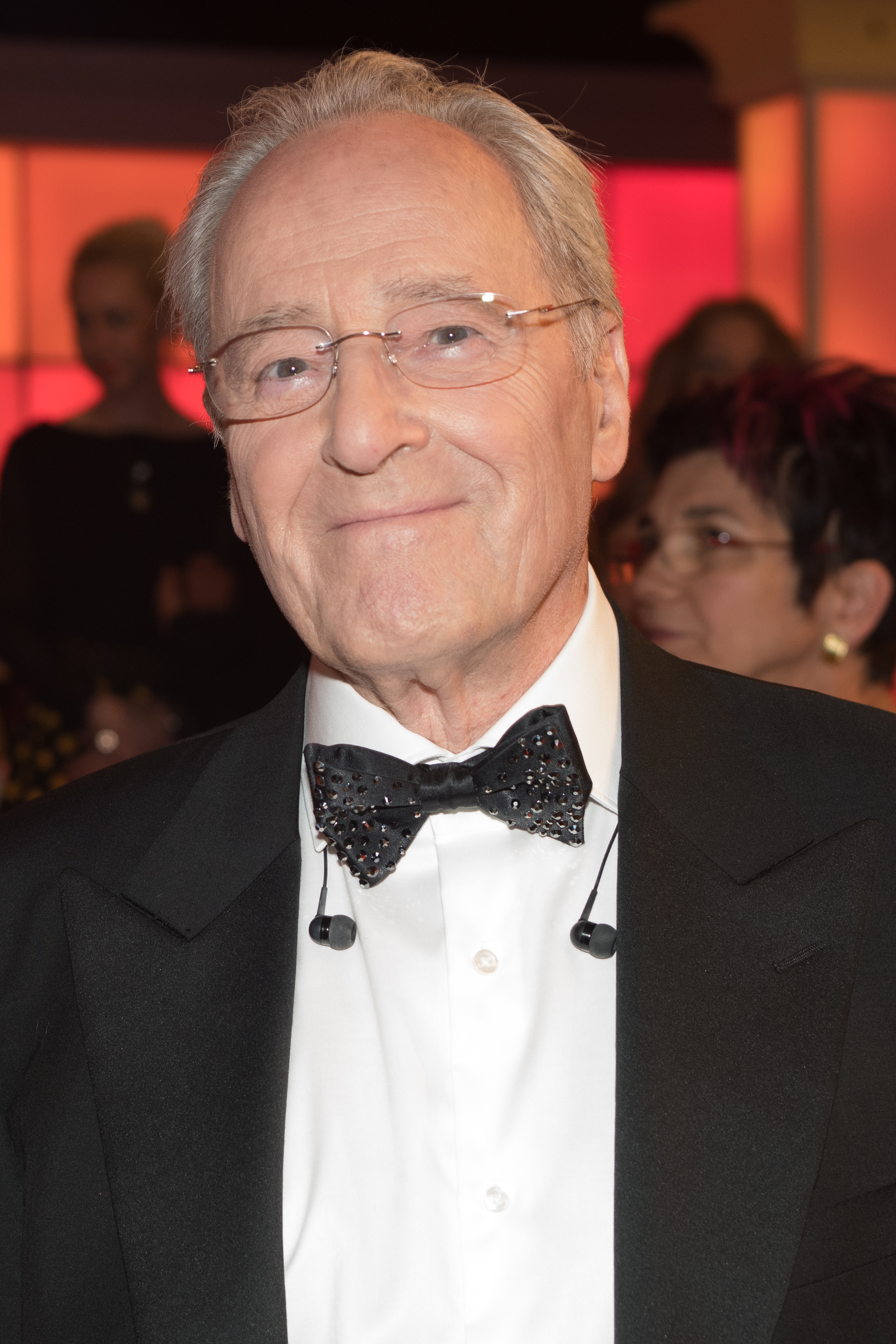
- Oesterreicher in 2017
- Born: 10 November 1932; Vienna, Austria
- Died: 17 January 2023 (aged 90); Vienna, Austria
- Education: Music and Arts University of the City of Vienna
- Occupations: Conductor; Jazz musician

Richard Oesterreicher (10 November 1932 – 17 January 2023) was an Austrian conductor and jazz musician.

== Biography ==
Born in Vienna on 10 November 1932, Oesterreicher was the son of a music teacher. He took an apprenticeship as a typesetter in 1947 before studying piano and guitar at the Music and Arts University of the City of Vienna. From 1958 to 1967, he worked as a professional musician within a group and was then a studio artist, arranger, and musician in the ORF entertainment orchestra. He joined the ORF-Big Band in 1972 and became its leader in 1976. He conducted contributions for Austria in the Eurovision Song Contest from 1978 to 1987, and from 1990 to 1991.

In 1981, he founded the Richard Oesterreicher-Big-Band, in which he collaborated in television shows and record productions with artists such as Udo Jürgens, Peter Alexander, Bill Ramsey, Caterina Valente, José Carreras, Edita Gruberová, and Marianne Mendt.

Oesterreicher died in Vienna on 17 January 2023, at the age of 90.
