= Im Tal der wilden Rosen =

German television series

- Genre: Drama; Romance
- Starring: Maximilian Werner; Ralf Bauer; Carin C. Tietze
- Country of origin: Germany
- Original language: German
- No. of seasons: 4
- No. of episodes: 13

Production
- Running time: 1h 40min

Original release
- Network: ZDF
- Release: January 29, 2006 – November 23, 2008

Im Tal der wilden Rosen (English: In the Valley of Wild Roses) is a German television series. It aired 13 episodes on ZDF from January 29, 2006 to November 23, 2008.

The entire series is available on DVD in PAL format in German.

DVD Name	Episodes	Release Date
Im Tal der Wilden Rosen	1-3	December 4, 2006
Im Tal der Wilden Rosen 2	4-7	December 4, 2006
Im Tal der Wilden Rosen 3	8-11	June 5, 2009
Im Tal der Wilden Rosen 4	12-13	June 5, 2009

== Episodes ==
Season	Episode	Name	Release Date
1	1	Was das Herz befiehlt	Jan 29, 2006
1	2	Verzicht aus Liebe	Feb 12, 2006
1	3	Bis ans Ende der Welt	Mar 5, 2006
2	1	Herz im Wind	Jan 28, 2007
2	2	Triumph der Liebe	Feb 11, 2007
2	3	Im Herzen der Wahrheit	Feb 25, 2007
2	4	Vermächtnis der Liebe	Mar 18, 2007
3	1	Ritt ins Glück	Dec 16, 2007
3	2	Fluss der Liebe	Feb 17, 2008
3	3	Gipfel der Liebe	Mar 30, 2008
3	4	Prüfung des Herzens	Apr 20, 2008
4	1	Zerrissene Herzen	Nov 9, 2008
4	2	Die Macht der Liebe	Nov 23, 2008

== See also ==
- List of German television series
