= WEGA – Die Spezialeinheit der Polizei =

- Country of origin: Austria

WEGA – Die Spezialeinheit der Polizei is an Austrian television series.

== See also ==
- List of Austrian television series
