= Klimt (film) =

- Film poster
- Directed by: Raúl Ruiz
- Written by: Gilbert Adair; Raúl Ruiz; Herbert Vesely
- Produced by: Matthew Justice; Arno Ortmair; Dieter Pochlatko; Andreas Schmid
- Starring: John Malkovich; Veronica Ferres; Stephen Dillane; Saffron Burrows; Sandra Ceccarelli; Nikolai Kinski
- Cinematography: Ricardo Aronovich
- Edited by: Valeria Sarmiento
- Music by: Jorge Arriagada
- Distributed by: Gemini Films (France); Soda Pictures (United Kingdom)
- Release dates: 28 January 2006 (Rotterdam FF); 3 March 2006 (Austria)
- Running time: 131 minutes
- Countries: Austria; France; Germany; United Kingdom
- Language: English/German/French

Klimt is a 2006 biographical film about the life of the Austrian painter Gustav Klimt (1862–1918). It was written and directed by Chilean filmmaker Raúl Ruiz, with an English screenplay adaptation by Gilbert Adair. The director of photography was Ricardo Aronovich, and the music was composed by Jorge Arriagada. The title role is played by John Malkovich and the cast includes Stephen Dillane. Both a 130-minute-long director's cut and a shortened producer's cut of 96 minutes were shown at the 2006 Berlin Film Festival. A few months later the film was shown at the 28th Moscow International Film Festival where it was nominated for two awards, winning the Russian Film Clubs Federation Award.

== Plot ==
This art house film is presented in the format of a sequence of nearly two dozen often disassociated vignettes taken from the life of Gustav Klimt and visualized by him in his recollection. All of this occurs while he is being treated late in life in hospital using mercury treatments for advanced syphilis which he had contracted earlier in his life. In his advanced age, Klimt has become a leading artist in Vienna and his work is celebrated at all levels of society in Austria.

Throughout his life, Klimt has had a special interest in the depiction of the beauty he associates with the female form and his studio is constantly occupied by nude models posing for his drawings and oil paintings. Klimt is open minded as to the expression of his own sexuality and casually forms sexual relationships with many of his models, some of whom bear his children, some of whose identities he knows and some of which are nearly anonymous to him. In one visit to a local brothel with a male acquaintance, an older Klimt is introduced to one of the prostitutes as actually being his daughter, fathered during his visits to the brothel as a younger man. When his acquaintance asks him if this is true, Klimt casually says he does not know and the two men continue their evening of indulgence.

A recurrent figure in the visualized vignettes which Klimt experiences while receiving mercury treatment in hospital, is an unnamed government official who seems to obtain commissions from the Ministry of Culture for Klimt. When a three panel order is made for three large canvases, Klimt paints them and they are displayed with a large government reception. The reception is mixed as to the assessment of the quality of the works of art, though Klimt is accepted as an artist of stature to be respected by both higher and lower officials. During the vignettes, his fellow Austrian artist Egon Schiele also visits Klimt at various points in his life during Klimt's visualized segments of his life while his mercury treatment is continued.

Klimt's two main love affairs are with his friend from Austria, Emilie Floege, and an actress, Lea de Castro, from Paris, both of whom he often depicts in his art works. He is strongly attracted to both models for their presentation of the beauty of the female form and at one point even proposes marriage to his favorite Emilie so long as the marriage be an open marriage. In one of the vignettes, Klimt is pictured with his mother and sister, both of whom are under care in an asylum for the mentally ill, and they confront him with questions about the illegitimate children he is rumored to have fathered. Klimt again states that he does not know how many children he has fathered or the general whereabouts of his progeny. As Klimt reaches the final stages of his mercury treatment, he expires during the treatment, his last recollections being about the beauty of his art rather than any of the moral ascriptions made concerning his lifetime which all appear to have been secondary to him in comparison to the importance he associated with his career as an artist.

== Cast ==
- John Malkovich as Gustav Klimt
- Veronica Ferres as Emilie "Midi" Floege
- Stephen Dillane as Secretary
- Saffron Burrows as Lea de Castro (based on Cléo de Mérode)
- Sandra Ceccarelli as Serena Lederer
- Nikolai Kinski as Egon Schiele
- Aglaia Szyszkowitz as Mizzi
- Joachim Bißmeier as Hugo Moritz
- Ernst Stötzner as Minister Hartl
- Paul Hilton as Duke Octave
- Annemarie Düringer as Anna Finster Klimt
- Irina Wanka as Berta Zuckerkandl
- Klaus Ofczarek as Old Waiter

== Critical response ==
Philip French, in The Observer described the film as calculatedly enigmatic. Cosmo Landesman, in The Sunday Times, described the film as "frigid and silly" being unnecessarily difficult to follow in the style of Stanley Kubrick's Eyes Wide Shut.

On review aggregation website Rotten Tomatoes, Klimt holds an approval rating of 32% based on 25 reviews, with an average rating of 5.04/10. The site's critical consensus reads, "Klimt is handsomely filmed, but the blurred storyline and substandard performances prove its undoing." On Metacritic, the film has a weighted average score of 44 out of 100, based on 7 critics, indicating "mixed or average reviews".
