= Austria 9 =

Austrian television channel

- Country: Austria
- Broadcast area: National; Parts of Germany

Ownership
- Owner: ProSiebenSat.1 Media

History
- Launched: 12 December 2007
- Closed: 3 July 2012
- Replaced by: Sixx (Austrian feed)

Availability

Terrestrial
- Austria: available free-to-air on digital terrestrial television

Austria 9 was an Austrian free-to-air generalist television network, owned by the German conglomerate ProSiebenSat.1 Media. Regulator RTR granted a license on 6 December 2007; broadcasts started at 12:12pm on 12 December 2007. The channel broadcast from the Rosenhügel Studios in Vienna.

It closed on 3 July 2012, being replaced by a local version of Sixx.

== History ==
Austria 9 started regular broadcasts on 12 December 2007. In November 2009, the station was acquired in its totality by businessman Conrad Heberling and the Andmann Media Holding.

The station provided a mostly family-friendly line-up, with Austrian and German films, American film and television productions, such as Will & Grace, The X-Files and reruns of the German series Bergdoktor. Teleshopping programs were also broadcast. The channel also carried newsmagazines from the states of Austria, the 9 being a reference to the number of states.

As of 2011, the channel's market share was of just 1% in the 12-49 demographic.

In April 2012, it was announced that ProSiebenSat.1 Media AG was set to acquire the channel, renaming it as Sixx Austria in the process. On 3 July 2012, the channel closed.
