= Dolce Vita & Co =

- Country of origin: Austria

Dolce Vita & Co is an Austrian television series.

== See also ==
- List of Austrian television series
