= Oberinspektor Marek (TV series) =

- Starring: Fritz Eckhardt
- Country of origin: Austria

Oberinspektor Marek is an Austrian television series.

== See also ==
- List of Austrian television series
