= Wenn das die Nachbarn wüßten =

- Country of origin: Austria
- No. of episodes: 12

Production
- Running time: 50 minutes

Wenn das die Nachbarn wüßten is an Austrian television series.

== See also ==
- List of Austrian television series
