= Traugott Konstantin Oesterreich =

German religious philosopher (1880–1949)

Traugott Konstantin Oesterreich (15 September 1880, Stettin – 28 July 1949, Tübingen) was a German religious psychologist and philosopher and professor at the University of Tübingen.

Oesterreich was also interested in parapsychology. He argued against the philosophy of materialism.

He was the author of Die Besessenheit (1921), a book on demonic possession. It was translated into English in 1966. William Peter Blatty, author of The Exorcist, was influenced by the book.

== Publications ==
- Kant und die Metaphysik (Kantstudien, Ergänzungsheft Nr. 2), Berlin 1906; zuvor als Dissertationsdruck: Halle 1905.
- Die deutsche Philosophie in der zweiten Hälfte des XIX. Jahrhunderts, Tübingen 1910.
- Die Phänomenologie des Ich in ihren Grundproblemen, Leipzig 1910.
- Die religiöse Erfahrung als philosophisches Problem. Vortrag gehalten in der Kant-Gesellschaft in Berlin am 14. April 1915, Berlin 1915.
- Einführung in die Religionspsychologie als Grundlage für Religionsphilosophie und Religionsgeschichte, Berlin 1917.
- Das Weltbild der Gegenwart, Berlin 1920; 2. Aufl. Berlin 1925.
- Die Besessenheit, Langensalza 1921.
- Der Okkultismus im modernen Weltbild, Dresden 1921.
- Die Philosophie des Auslandes vom Beginn des 19. Jahrhunderts bis auf die Gegenwart. Überwegs Grundriss der Geschichte der Philosophie, Fünfter Teil. Berlin 1923, bearbeitet von Traugott Konstantin Oesterreich.
- Occultism and Modern Science (1923)
- Die philosophische Bedeutung der mediumistischen Phänomene. Erweiterte Fassung des auf dem Zweiten Internationalen Kongress für parapsychologische Forschung in Warschau gehaltenen Vortrags, Stuttgart 1924.
- The possessed: Demonic possession among Primitive peoples, in Antiquity, the Middle Ages, and Modern Times (1927).
- Grundbegriffe der Parapsychologie. Eine Philosophische Studie, Pfullingen 1931.
