= OP ruft Dr. Bruckner =

- Country of origin: Germany

OP ruft Dr. Bruckner is a television series that airs in Germany.

== See also ==
- List of German television series
