= Österreich I =

- Country of origin: Austria

Österreich I is an Austrian television series first airing in 1989 by the Austrian broadcaster ORF starring Austrian journalist Hugo Portisch and Sepp Riff. Österreich I is a history documentary about the first Republic of Austria.

== See also ==
- List of Austrian television series
