= SK Austria Klagenfurt =

SK Austria Klagenfurt may refer to:

- FC Kärnten (1920–2009), defunct Austrian football club which was known as SK Austria Klagenfurt until 1997
- SK Austria Kärnten (2007–2010), defunct Austrian football club
- SK Austria Klagenfurt (2007), an Austrian football club established in 2007
