= Die liebe Familie =

- Starring: Erne Seder, Heinz Marecek
- Country of origin: Austria
- No. of seasons: 14
- No. of episodes: 384

Production
- Running time: 45 minutes

Original release
- Release: 16 December 1980 – 18 December 1993

Die liebe Familie is an Austrian live television series broadcast by ORF about an upper middle-class family from Vienna. It acted as a bourgeois counterpart to the poor Sackbauers of the 1970s series "A Real Viennese does not go under"

== See also ==
- List of Austrian television series
