= Familie Merian =

Austrian television series

- Country of origin: Austria
- No. of episodes: 30

Production
- Running time: 45 minutes

Familie Merian is an Austrian television series.

== See also ==
- List of Austrian television series
