= Die Lottosieger =

- Created by: Leo Bauer, Fritz Schindlecker
- Written by: Fritz Schindlecker
- Directed by: Leo Bauer
- Starring: Reinhard Nowak; Theresia Haiger; Brigitte Neumeister; David Heissig; Hilde Dalik; Alexander Pschill
- Country of origin: Austria
- No. of seasons: 3
- No. of episodes: 30

Production
- Running time: 25 minutes
- Production companies: e&a Film

Original release
- Network: ORF 1
- Release: 6 March 2009 – 28 December 2012

Die Lottosieger (English: Lottery Winners) is an Austrian comedy television series. It was produced from 2008 to 2011 and broadcast from 2009 to 2012 on ORF 1. Die Lottosieger is about a family that becomes rich by winning the lottery.

== Cast ==
- Reinhard Nowak as Rudolf "Rudi" Deschek
- Theresia Haiger as Claudia Deschek-Beck
- Brigitte Neumeister as Kriemhild Deschek (Rudi's mother)
- David Heissig as Romeo Deschek (Claudia and Rudi's son)
- Hilde Dalik as Elfi Beck (Claudia's sister)
- Alexander Pschill as Dr. Rüdiger Rössler (psychologist, employed by the lottery to assist lottery millionaires)

== Episodes ==
Season #	Series #	Title	Original airdate
Season 1
1	1	Macht 6 glücklich?	6 March 2009
2	2	Ist Geiz geil?	13 March 2009
3	3	Bringt Vollgas Vollspaß?	20 March 2009
4	4	Wer traut wem?	27 March 2009
5	5	Macht Borgen Sorgen?	3 April 2009
6	6	Mit Schuhen ins Bett?	17 April 2009
7	7	Welcher Schwager passt wem?	24 April 2009
8	8	Wer ist der Täter?	1 May 2009
9	9	Wie kommt der Kuckuck ins Nest?	8 May 2009
10	10	Lachs oder Leberkäs?	15 May 2009
Season 2
1	11	Ist das Paradies mies?	11 March 2011
2	12	Sind Schwiegermütter böse?	18 March 2011
3	13	Wer fürchtet sich vorm Kopftuch?	1 April 2011
4	14	Wer wird Zweiter?	8 April 2011
5	15	Karriere als Legionär?	15 April 2011
6	16	Ausgerechnet Las Vegas?	29 April 2011
7	17	Ist Schönheit gratis?	6 May 2011
8	18	Wahrheit erwünscht?	13 May 2011
9	19	Trotz Krise Beziehungen?	20 May 2011
10	20	Poltern ohne Braut?	27 May 2011
Season 3
1	21	Big Boss Deschek?	23 November 2012
2	22	Absturz oder Höhenflug?	23 November 2012
3	23	Lügen die Sterne?	30 November 2012
4	24	Vatersein ist schwer?	30 November 2012
5	25	Ex in der City?	7 December 2012
6	26	Madam Butterfly & Mrs. Robinson?	7 December 2012
7	27	Kein Geständnis machen?	14 December 2012
8	28	Spekulieren ohne Risiko?	14 December 2012
9	29	Täglich eine gute Tat?	21 December 2012
10	30	Reif fürs Landleben?	28 December 2012

== See also ==
- List of Austrian television series
