= Trautmann (TV series) =

- Country of origin: Austria

Trautmann is an Austrian television series.

== See also ==
- List of Austrian television series
