= Oestreich =

Oestreich is a German surname. Notable people with the surname include:

- Elisabeth Oestreich (1909–1994), German middle-distance runner
- James R. Oestreich (born 1943), American music critic
- Markus Oestreich (born 1963), German racing driver
- Martin Oestreich (born 1971), German chemist
- Nancy Oestreich Lurie (1924–2017), American anthropologist
- Paul Oestreich (1878–1959), German educator
