= Weltberühmt in Österreich – 50 Jahre Austropop =

- Country of origin: Austria

Weltberühmt in Österreich – 50 Jahre Austropop is an Austrian television series.

== See also ==
- List of Austrian television series
