= Die Neue – Eine Frau mit Kaliber =

- Country of origin: Austria, Germany

Die Neue – Eine Frau mit Kaliber (English: The New One – A Woman with Caliber) is a German television series.

== See also ==
- List of German television series
