= Fast Forward (Austrian TV series) =

- Schnell ermittelt
- Country of origin: Austria
- No. of episodes: 78

Original release
- Network: ORF 1
- Release: April 21, 2009

Schnell ermittelt (branded in English as Fast Forward) is an Austrian television series. Its plot centers on Chief Inspector Angelika Schnell who is portrayed by actress Ursula Strauss. Its original German title can be seen as both a play on words - fast investigated - and more commonly as a short description of the series - (Ms.) Schnell investigates. As of 2024, eight seasons of the show have been aired.

== See also ==
- List of Austrian television series
