= SOKO Donau =

Austrian crime drama television series

- Series logo
- Genre: Police procedural
- Written by: various
- Directed by: various
- Composers: Lothar Scherpe; Bob Gutdeutsch; Péter Wolf; Joao Jarosch
- Country of origin: Austria
- Original language: German
- No. of seasons: 20
- No. of episodes: 292

Production
- Executive producers: Heinrich Ambrosch; Sonja Hofmann; Klaus Jüptner
- Producer: various
- Cinematography: various
- Editor: various
- Running time: 45 minutes
- Production companies: ORF; ZDF

Original release
- Release: 20 September 2005 (ORF); 18 October 2005 (ZDF)

Related
- SOKO München

SOKO Donau (in Germany SOKO Wien) is an Austrian crime drama television series produced by ORF in collaboration with the German network ZDF. It is the sixth spin-off of the German crime series SOKO 5113 (SOKO München since 2015), launched in 1978. The show, which debuted on 20 September 2005 in Austria and 18 October 2005 in Germany, focuses on a Viennese police team responsible for investigating crimes committed on the Danube (German: Donau) river and its tributaries. The boat team operates in and around Vienna as well as Lower and Upper Austria, sometimes travelling all the way to Bratislava.

== Crossover ==
A crossover episode with Leipzig Homicide, titled "Der vierte Mann", was broadcast on ORF on 2 November 2019 and ZDF on 8 November 2019. The screenplay was based on a true story related to the Viennese political activist Rudolfine Steindling.

== Cast and characters ==
Current

Actor	Character	Rank	Since
Lilian Klebow	Penelope "Penny" Lanz	District inspector / Group inspector	2005–
Helmut Bohatsch	Franz Wohlfahrt	Crime technician	2005–
Paul Matić	Dr. Paul Seiler	Chief prosecutor	2005–
Hary Prinz	Ernst Kanter	BKA chief	2006–
Maria Happel	Dr. Franziska Beck	Medical examiner	2010–
Brigitte Kren	Dr. Henriette Wolf	Chief	2018–
Andreas Kiendl	Klaus Lechner	District inspector	2021–
Martin Gruber	Max Herzog	Chief inspector	2022–

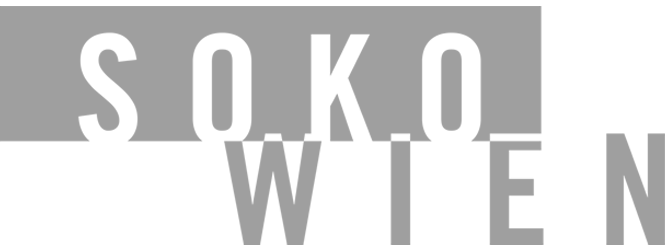
German series logo

== See also ==
- List of Austrian television series
