= List of Austrian actresses =

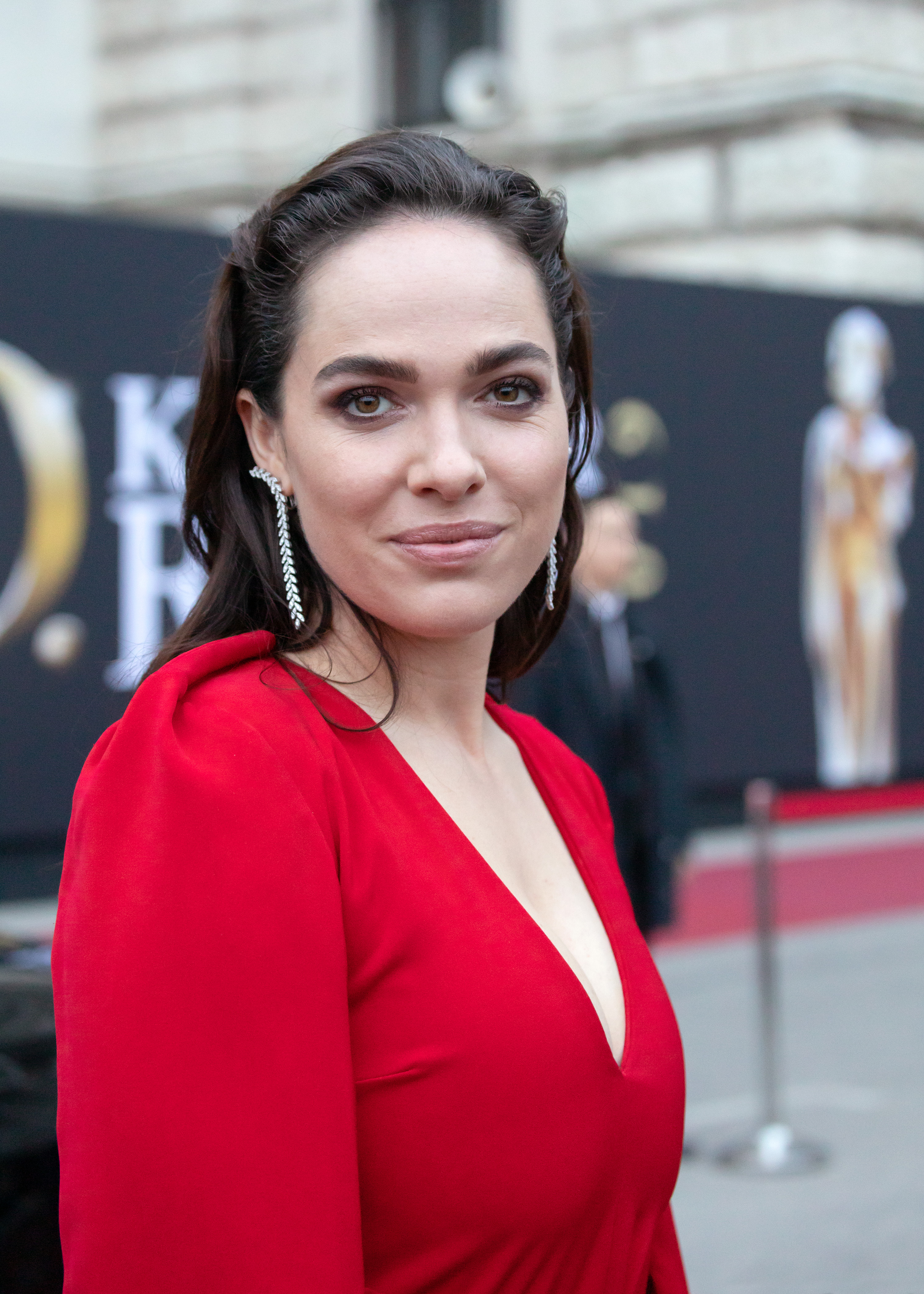
Verena Altenberger, 2019

The following is a list of notable actresses from Austria.

== A ==
- Rosa Albach-Retty
- Susanne von Almassy
- Verena Altenberger
- Helga Anders
- Fanny Altenburger
- Elsie Altmann-Loos
- Hannelore Auer

== B ==
- Hayley Barr
- Viktoria von Ballasko
- Tilly Bébé
- Grete Berger
- Senta Berger (Senta Verhoeven)
- Eva von Berne
- Laura Bilgeri
- Sybille Binder
- Betty Bird
- Tala Birell
- Hedwig Bleibtreu
- Monica Bleibtreu
- Katharina Böhm
- Ruth Brinkmann
- Christine Buchegger
- Marie von Bülow
- Toni von Bukovics
- Hansi Burg

== C ==
- Carmen Cartellieri
- Julia Cencig
- Mady Christians
- María Corda
- Friedl Czepa

== D ==
- Sybil Danning
- Elfriede Datzig
- Vilma Degischer
- Birgit Doll
- Josefine Dora
- Beatrice von Dovsky
- Tilla Durieux
- Ina Duscha

== E ==
- Inge Egger
- Maria Eis
- Maria Emo
- Olga Engl
- Lucie Englisch
- Anna Exl

== F ==
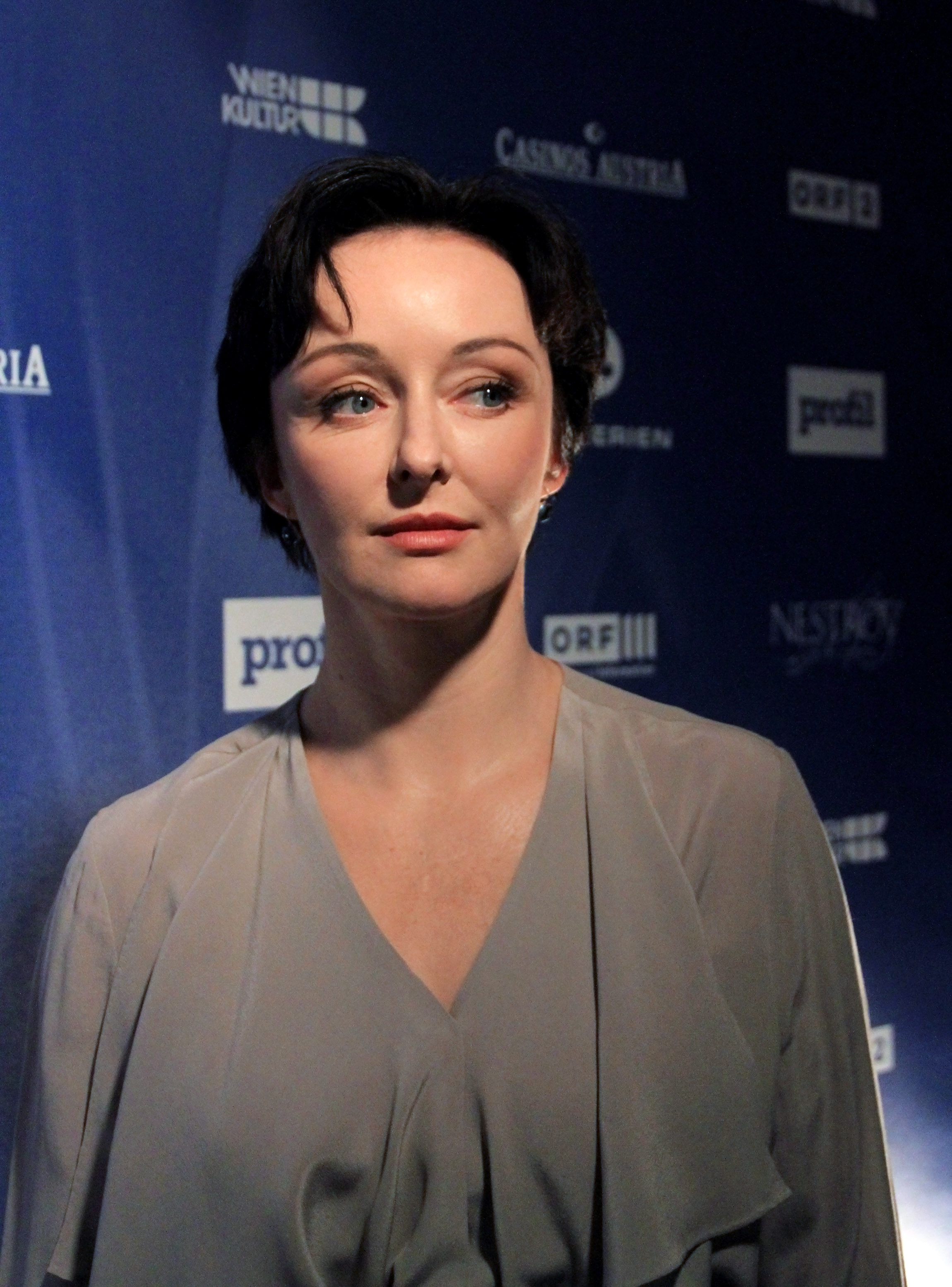
Regina Fritsch, 2012

- Anna F.
- Claude Farell
- Hertha Feiler
- Maria Fein
- Lilly Flohr
- Traute Foresti
- Loni von Friedl
- Regina Fritsch

== G ==
- Gisa Geert
- Adrienne Gessner
- Käthe Gold
- Lisl Goldarbeiter
- Marianne Golz
- Nora Gregor
- Mizzi Griebl
- Ilka Grüning

== H ==
- Waltraut Haas
- Grit Haid
- Liane Haid
- Mona Hala
- Andrea Händler
- Marte Harell
- Heidemarie Hatheyer
- Angelika Hauff
- Maria Holst
- Judith Holzmeister
- Christiane Hörbiger
- Nora Houfová
- Gusti Huber

== J ==
- Ulla Jacobsson
- Antonie Janisch
- Gertraud Jesserer
- Jenny Jugo

== K ==
- Anna Kallina
- Isabel Karajan
- Franziska Kinz
- Josefin Kipper
- Sonja Kirchberger
- Doris Kirchner
- Hansi Knoteck
- Dagmar Koller
- Leopoldine Konstantin
- Hilde Körber
- Hilde Krahl
- Dorit Kreysler
- Ida Krottendorf
- Nicolin Kunz

== L ==
- Hedy Lamarr
- Elissa Landi
- Lotte Lang
- Gilda Langer
- Susi Lanner
- Lotte Ledl
- Lotte Lenya
- Eva Löbau
- Gerlinde Locker
- Paola Loew
- Lina Loos
- Celia Lovsky
- Sissy Löwinger

== M ==
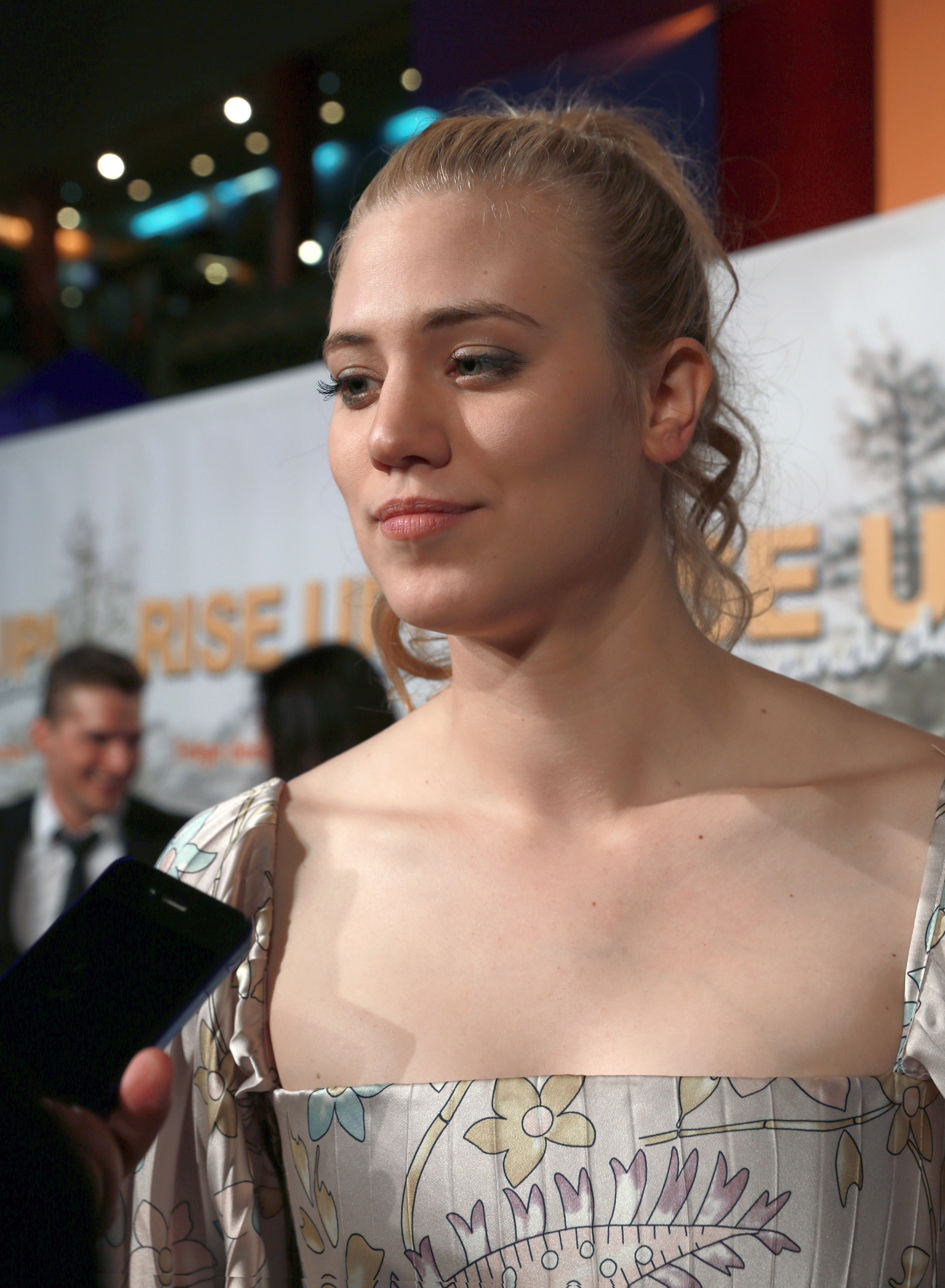
Larissa Marolt

- Madita
- Erni Mangold
- Christl Mardayn
- Elisabeth Markus
- Larissa Marolt
- Valerie von Martens
- Johanna Matz
- Gerda Maurus
- Emmy Mauthner
- Inge Maux
- Eva May
- Mia May
- Herta Mayen
- Elfie Mayerhofer
- Marisa Mell
- Sunnyi Melles
- Marianne Mendt
- Anny Miletty
- Edith Mill
- Marietta Millner
- Birgit Minichmayr
- Maria Minzenti
- Marion Mitterhammer
- Trude von Molo

== N ==
- Grete Natzler
- Hertha Natzler
- Dorothea Neff
- Krista Nell
- Elisabeth Neumann-Viertel
- Susi Nicoletti
- Hansi Niese

== O ==
- Ressel Orla
- Ida Orloff
- Christine Ostermayer
- Elfriede Ott

== P ==
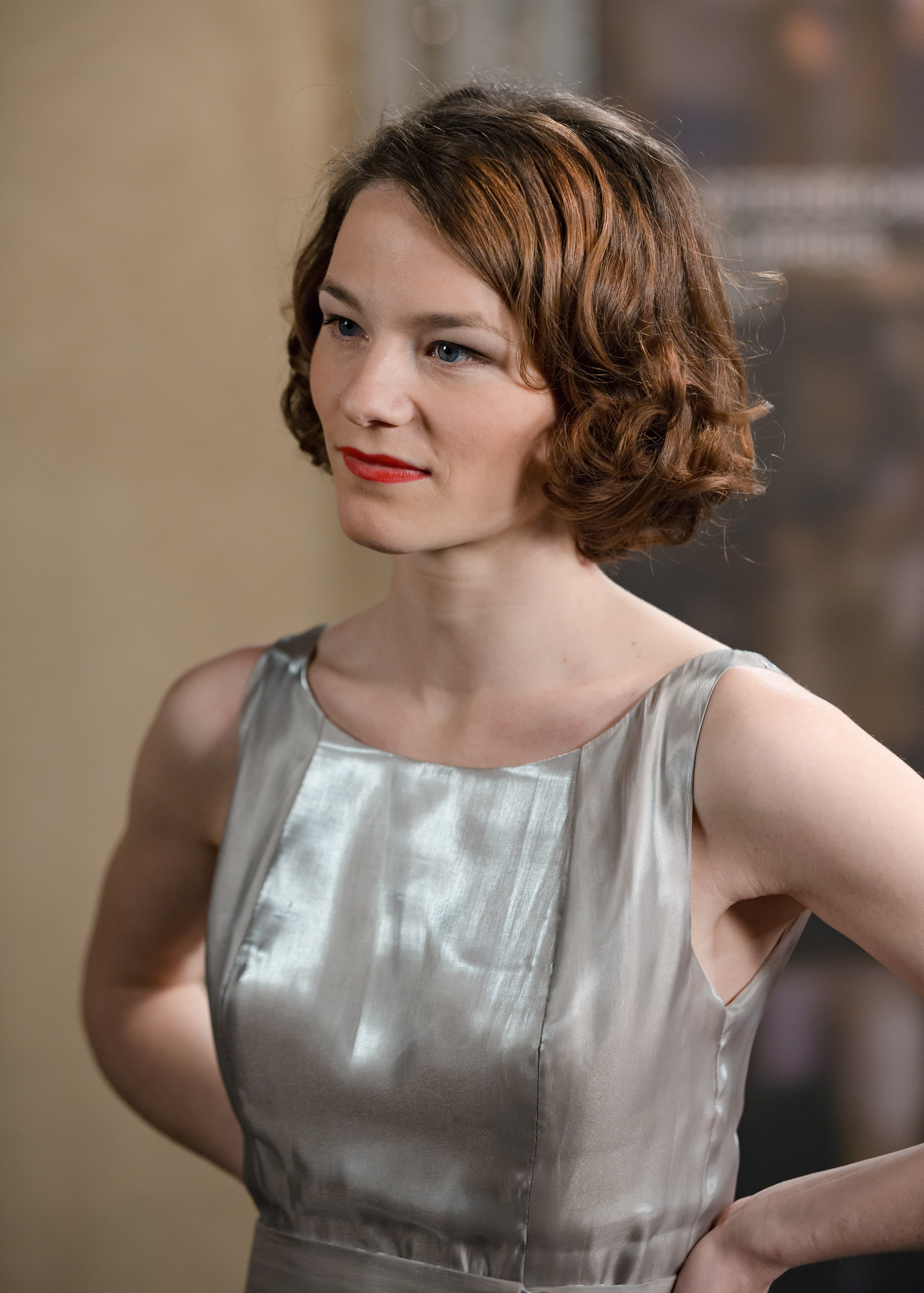
Valerie Pachner

- Valerie Pachner
- Sophie Pagay
- Grace Palotta
- Hertha Pauli
- Eva Pawlik
- Maria Perschy
- Clementine Plessner
- Erika Pluhar
- Irene Prador
- Nina Proll
- Auguste Pünkösdy

== R ==
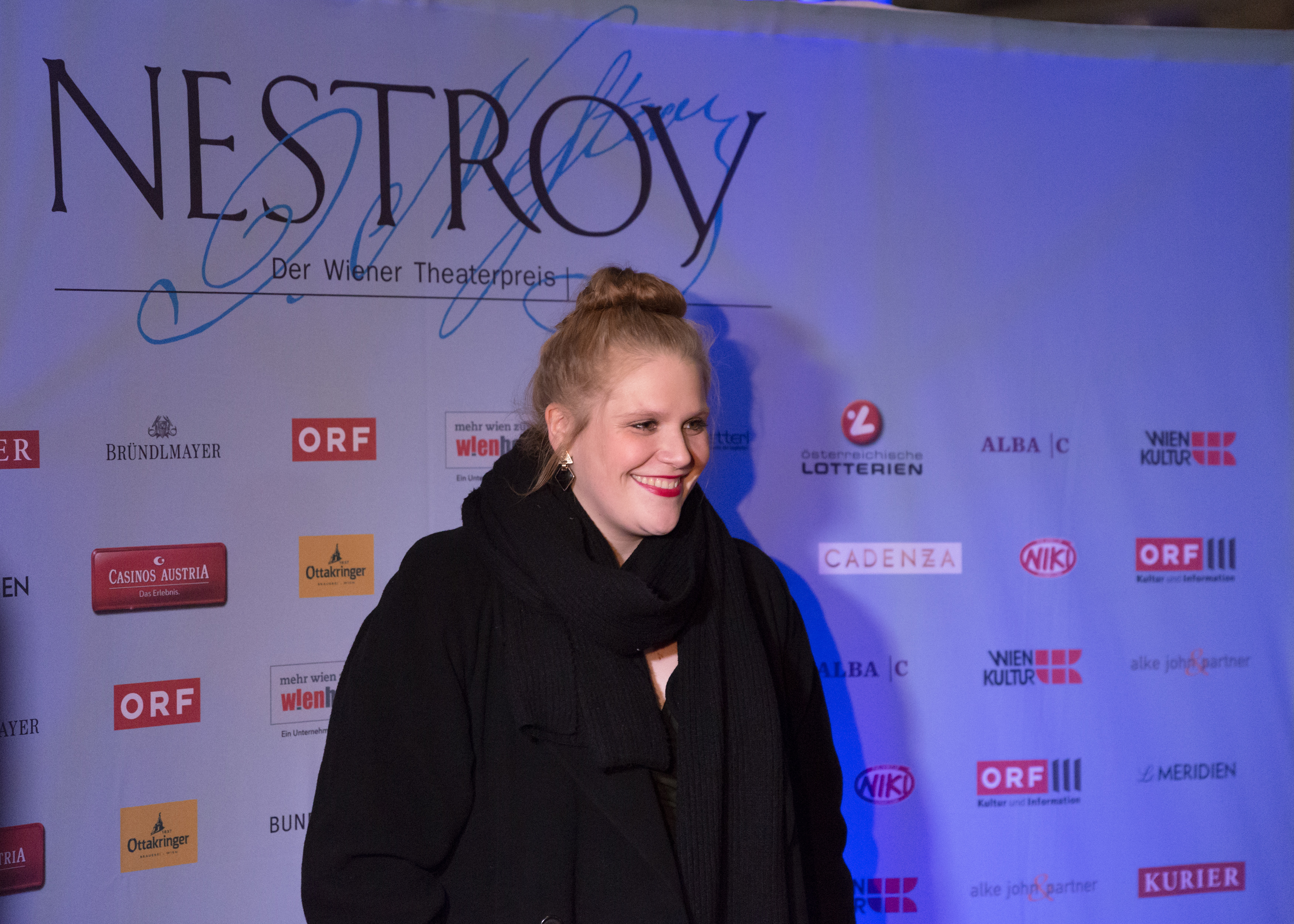
Stefanie Reinsperger

- Else Rambausek
- Maria Reisenhofer
- Stefanie Reinsperger
- Erika Remberg
- Patricia Rhomberg
- Frida Richard
- Ellen Richter
- Maria Rohm
- Sophie Rois
- Annie Rosar

== S ==
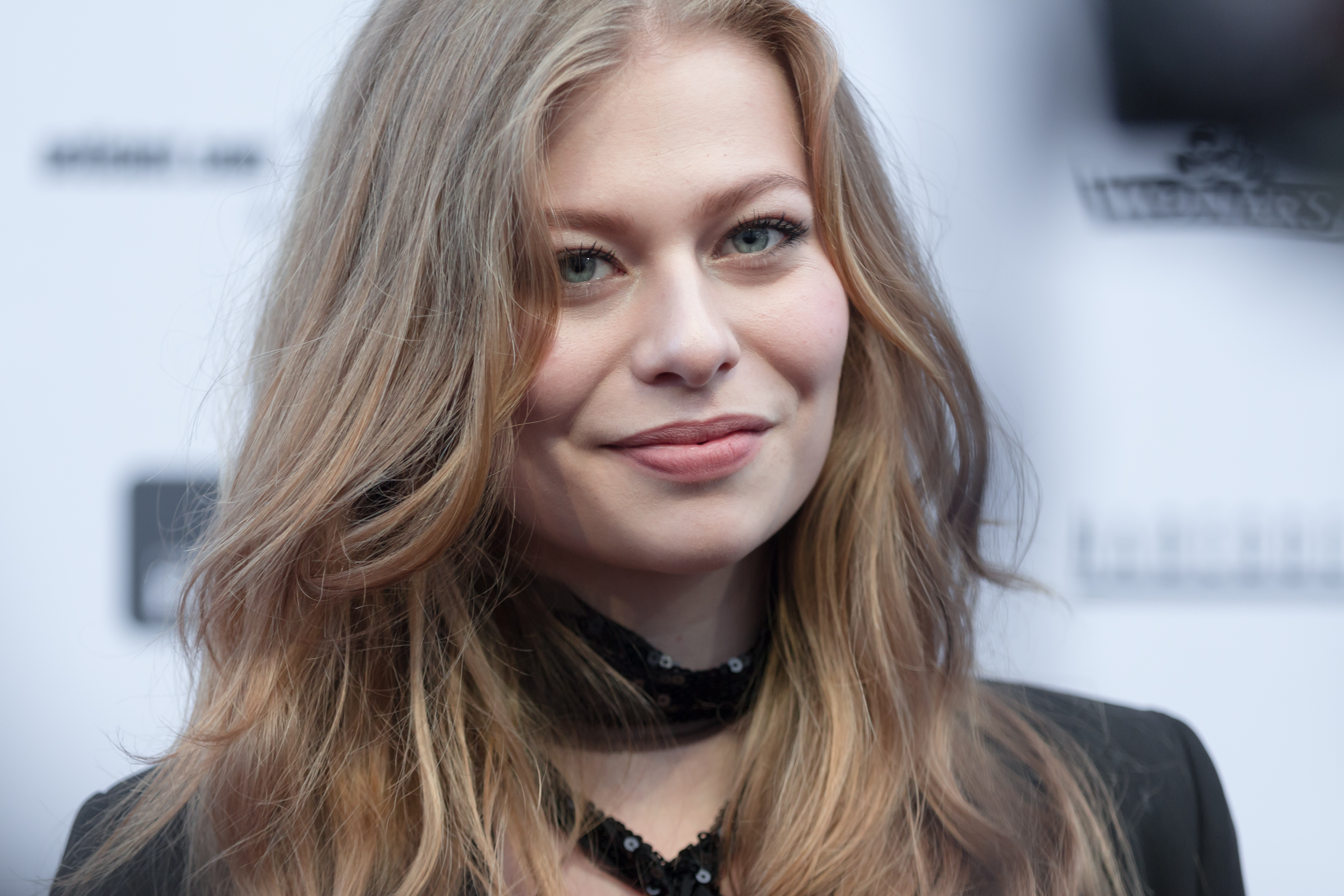
Zoë Straub

- Leontine Sagan
- Angela Salloker
- Amira El Sayed
- Maria Schell
- Marianne Schönauer
- Gretl Schörg
- Christine Schuberth
- Christa Schwertsik
- Alma Seidler
- Julia Serda
- Dagny Servaes
- Margarete Slezak
- Sybil Smolova
- Magda Sonja
- Steffie Spira
- Herta Staal
- Julia Stemberger
- Hilde von Stolz
- Zoë Straub
- Rose Stradner
- Mathilde Sussin

== T ==
- Herta Talmar
- Karina Thayenthal
- Gretl Theimer
- Helene Thimig
- Jane Tilden
- Nadja Tiller
- Elisabeth Trissenaar
- Nini Tsiklauri
- Berta Türk

== U ==
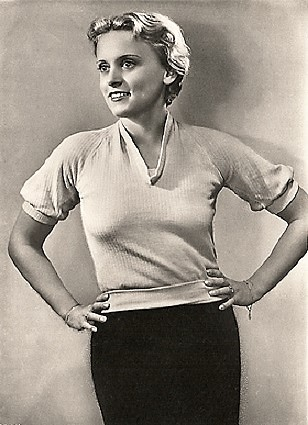
Luise Ullrich (1910 – 1985)

- Luise Ullrich

== V ==
- Erica Vaal
- Barbara Valentin

== W ==
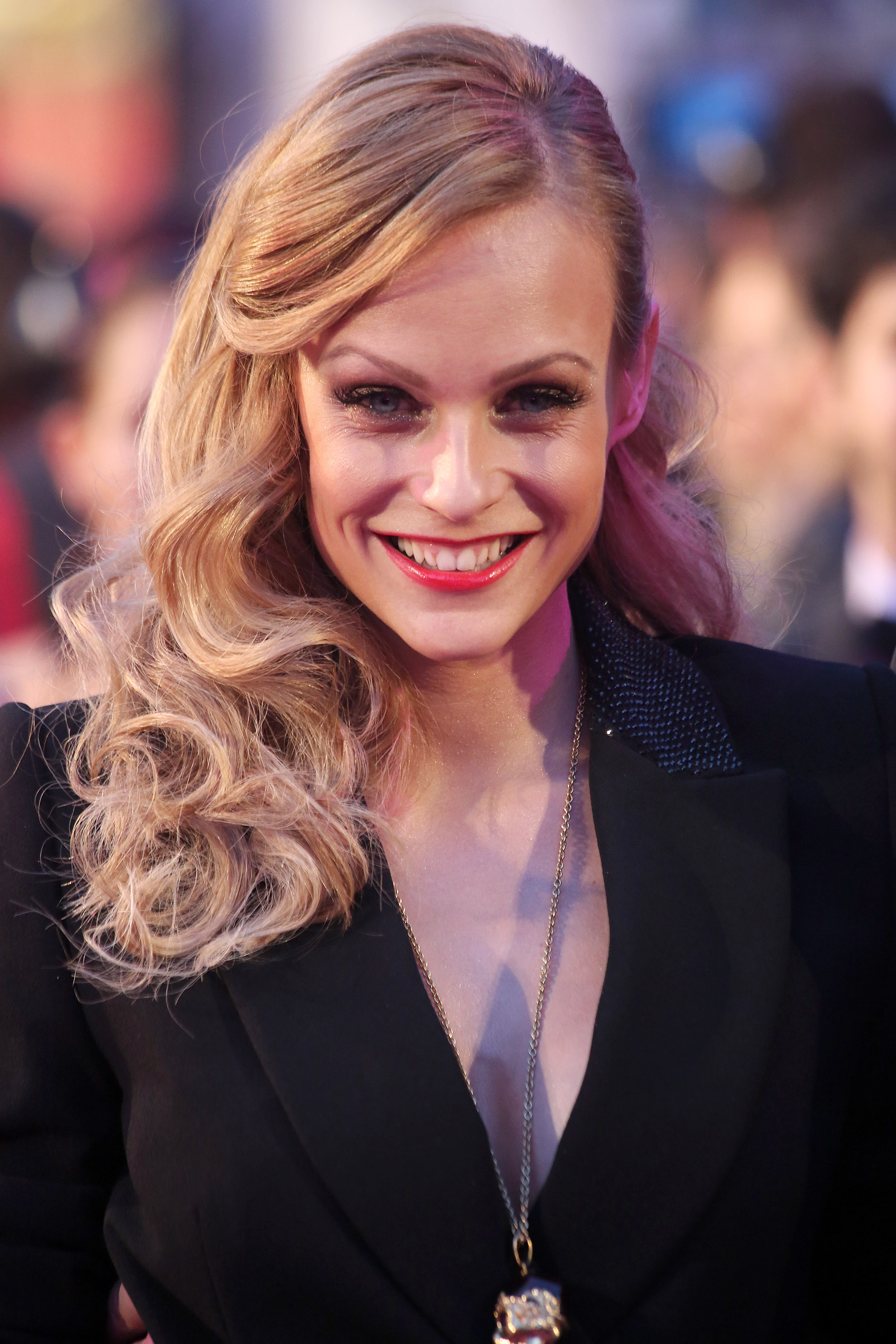
Mirjam Weichselbraun

- Hilde Wagener
- Lizzi Waldmüller
- Marianne Walla
- Mirjam Weichselbraun
- Heidelinde Weis
- Thea Weis
- Franziska Weisz
- Senta Wengraf
- Gisela Werbezirk
- Paula Wessely
- Elke Winkens
- Lina Woiwode
- Gusti Wolf
- Susanne Wuest

== Z ==
- Maria Zelenka
- Bibiana Zeller
