= Stemberger =

Stemberger is a surname. Notable people with the surname include:

- Gerhard Stemberger (born 1947), Austrian psychotherapist
- Günter Stemberger (born 1940), Austrian professor for Judaic studies
- Julia Stemberger (born 1965), Austrian actress
- Katharina Stemberger (born 1968), Austrian actress
