= Maria Theresia (miniseries) =

2017 Austrian-Czech historical miniseries

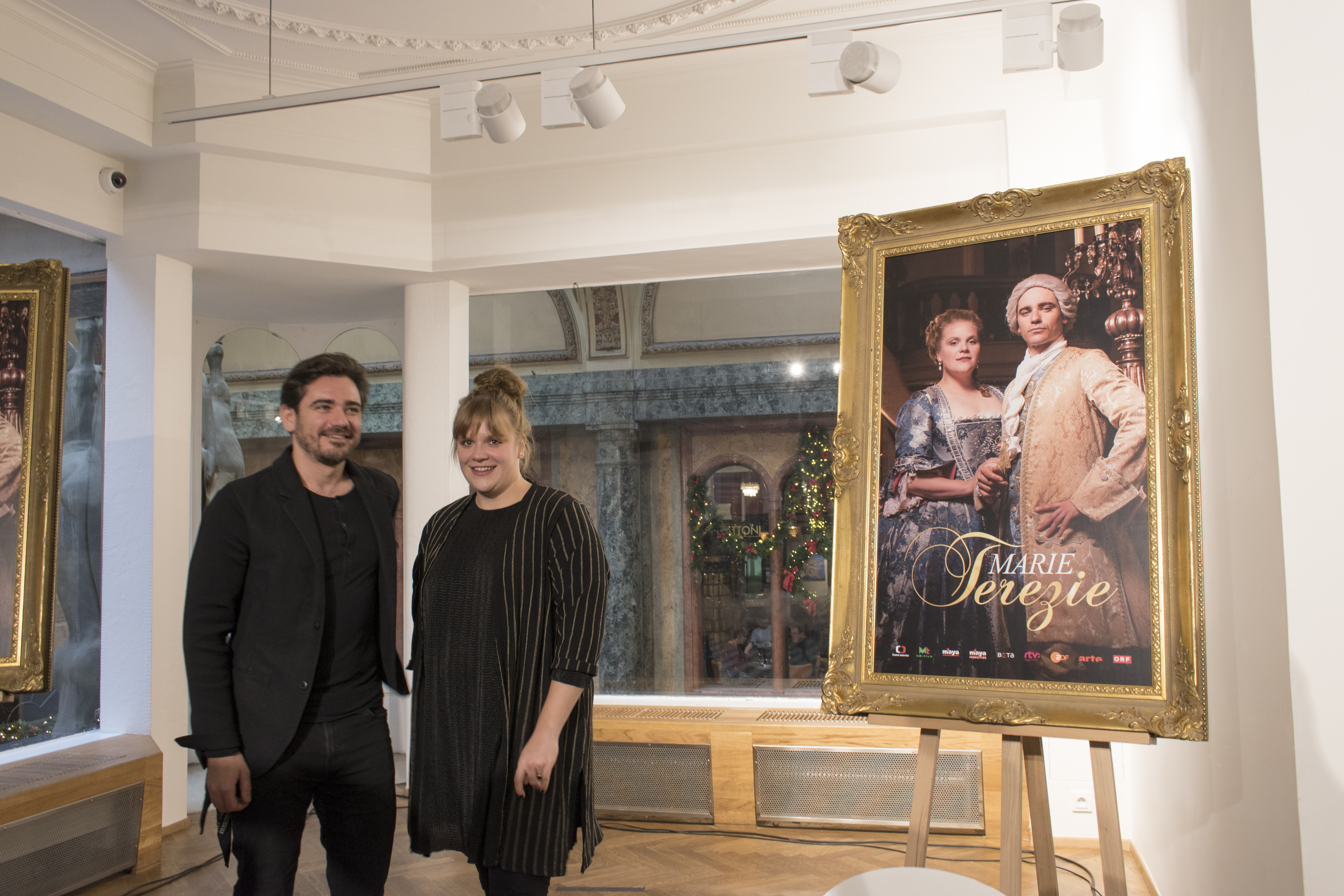
- Genre: Historical film Biographical film
- Written by: Mirka Zlatníková
- Directed by: Robert Dornhelm
- Starring: As Maria Theresia: Marie-Luise Stockinger (Season 1); Stefanie Reinsperger (Season 2); Ursula Strauss (Season 3); Rest of the cast: Vojtěch Kotek; Tatiana Pauhofová
- Music by: Roman Kariolou
- Countries of origin: Czech Republic; Austria; Slovakia; Hungary
- Original languages: Czech; Hungarian; German; Slovak

Production
- Cinematography: Tomáš Juříček
- Running time: 200 minutes
- Production companies: Czech Television; MR TV-Film; Maya Production; Radio and Television of Slovakia
- Budget: €4,700,000

Original release
- Release: 2017 – 2022

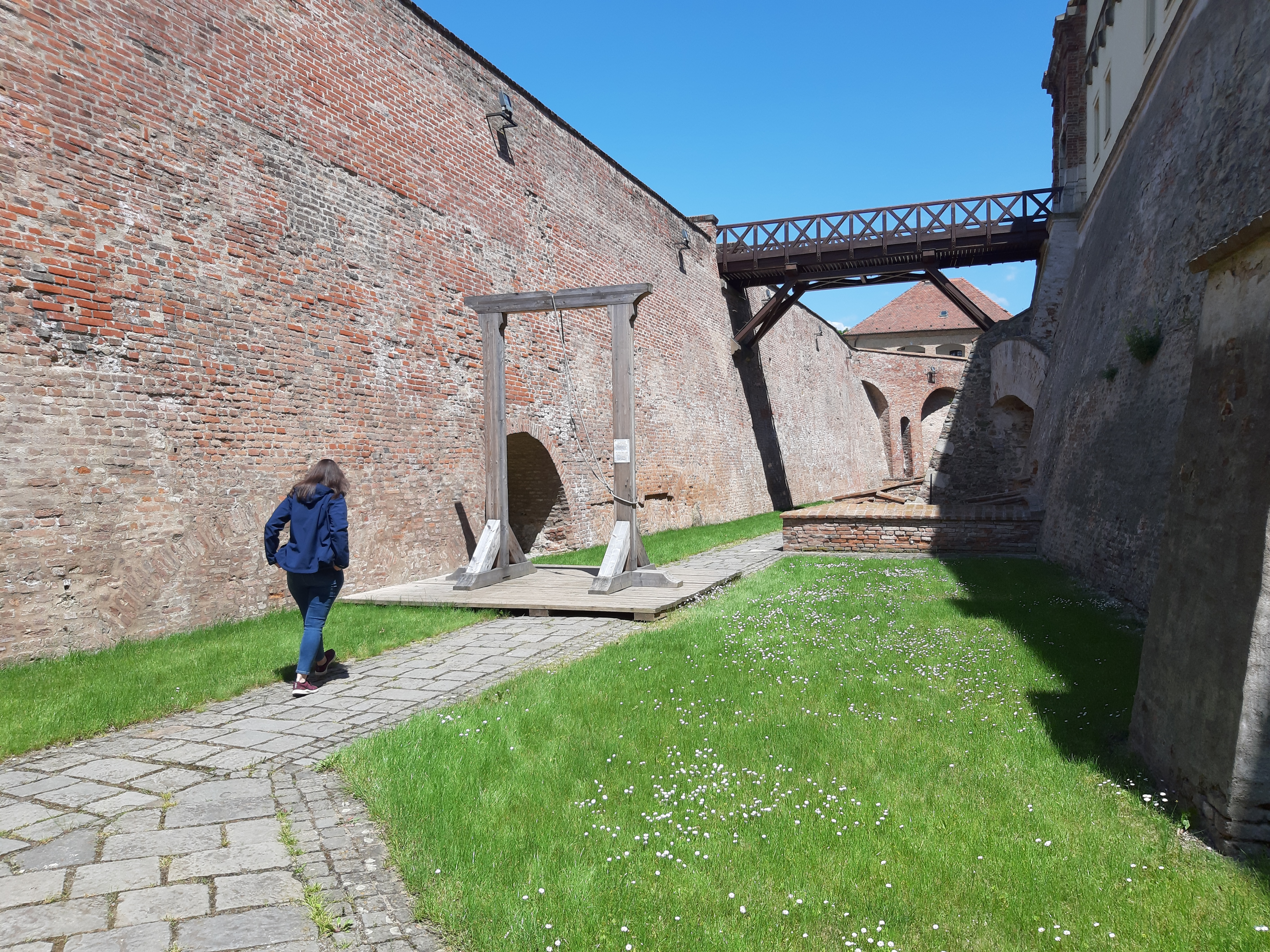
Part of the series was also filmed on Špilberk. The gallows, used in the series, remained here (June 2021).

Maria Theresia (Czech: Marie Terezie) is a 2017 Austrian-Czech historical miniseries. It was a coproduction of the Czech Republic, Austria, Slovakia, and Hungary. For the second and third season German ZDF and Franco-German Arte joined the production, replacing the Hungarian broadcaster.

Its first two episodes were broadcast in 2017, with two more in 2019 and a fifth and final part premiered on streaming at the end of 2021 before being broadcast in 2022.

== Plot ==
Parts 1 and 2 narrate two decades of Austrian history from 1723 to Maria Theresa's coronation as Hungarian queen on 25 June 1741. The focus is on the love story between Maria Theresa and her husband Franz Stephan of Lorraine. Parts 3 and 4 continue the story up to the coronation as the Bohemian Queen in 1743. Part 5 spans the last 20 years of her life with the focus on marriage politics.

=== Part 1 ===
Prague, 1723. Six-year-old Maria Theresa sees her life clearly planned: one day she will marry Franz Stephan of Lorraine and have many children with him. Everyone is waiting for the longed-for male descendant of Maria Theresa's father Charles VI but nine years later he is still not born. Due to the advanced age of Empress Elisabeth Christine of Brunswick-Wolfenbüttel, the doctor has meanwhile given up all hope: one can only pray for a miracle. Professor Gottfried Philipp Spannagel therefore recommends to deepen the upbringing of the firstborn Maria Theresa in order to prepare her for a possible reign.

Charles VI asks Eugene of Savoy to begin the wedding negotiations with Franz Stephan of Lorraine. Prince Eugene, however, has other plans: he has designed another husband for Maria Theresa, who should guarantee that there will be no war with Prussia. Eugene begins negotiations with Friedrich Wilhelm von Grumbkow: according to their plans, Maria Theresa is to be married to Crown Prince Friedrich of Prussia. He also offers Franz Stephan to marry Maria Theresia's sister Anna, and he initially agrees to the proposal. However, Maria Theresa wants only Franz Stephan as her husband.

The church suggests to Maria Theresa not to marry at all and to become a nun. With the support of Spannagel, Maria Theresa instead secretly prepares herself to rule, studying the history and politics of Europe. Count Nikolaus I Esterhazy discovers her by chance and makes it public: Spannagel ends up temporarily in prison and Maria Theresa is to be sent to a monastery. However, Maria Theresa suggests that Franz Stephan should give up his Duchy of Lorraine in favor of France, and in return he should get Tuscany. France will therefore recognise the Pragmatic Sanction and Franz Stephan will marry Maria Theresa.

Franz Stephan initially rejects the proposal. The Prussian Prince Friedrich is meanwhile already getting married, so Prussia also demands the marriage between Maria Theresa and Franz Stephan, considered weak and harmless from the Prussian point of view. Maria Theresa learns that Prince Eugene wanted to sell her to Prussia; however, he is already dying, and on his deathbed he recommends Count Philipp Kinsky as his successor.

After Spannagel initiated Franz Stephan into the political and military situation, he finally agreed to Maria Theresa's proposal. On the birthday of Maria Theresa's mother, Franz Stephan accepted the conditions and asked for Maria Theresa's hand. Count Philipp Kinsky is not very enthusiastic about this, and at the birthday party they receive the news of Prince Eugene's death. Franz Stephan and Maria Theresia get married and Maria Theresa later gives birth to her first two daughters; as in her parents' case, the longed-for male descendant is still missing. To escape life at the court, Franz Stephan and Maria Theresa move to Tuscany. Franz Stephan is planning to set up a cotton factory based on the English model and is successful in finding investors interested in it. Kinsky arrives to Tuscany to bring them the news that Charles VI has suffered a serious hunting accident, resulting in his death.

=== Part 2 ===
After the death of her father Charles VI, Maria Theresa and Franz Stephan return to the Viennese court with their third daughter: Maria Theresa has to take over her father's throne. On the way home, she witnesses the hunger, the hardship and the misery that reigns in her kingdom. Franz Stephan is initially excluded from politics, for example from participating to the Geheimrat, so he pursues his own interests. He has fun with the ladies at court, especially with Elisa Fritz; as an entrepreneur, he deals with the trade in cotton and silk and the establishment of a cloth manufacture. Maria Theresa would like for Franz Stephan to take his place in the army, but he rejects absolutely the war.

Several European princes lay claims on the Habsburg hereditary lands and the Holy Roman Empire. There is danger from the south, north, and west, and moreover the Prussian Marshal Grumbkow is still at the Viennese court. Maria Theresia is uncertain whether the pragmatic sanction will be accepted by everyone. She makes Count Kinsky, whom she had previously despised because of his supposed closeness to the late Prince Eugene, as her political advisor. He advises her to get support from Count Nikolaus I Esterhazy, and she initially rejects the idea since Esterhazy betrayed her when he discovered she was secretly studying politics and history.

Maria Theresa makes Marshal Grumbkow a member of the Geheimrat. Friedrich II proposes to Maria Theresa that he could support Franz Stephan in the election to emperor, and asks for Silesia in return. Maria Theresa does not accept Friedrich's offer, but she does not feel that she is being taken seriously by her own court. In the meantime Marshal Grumbkow is exposed as a double agent, arrested at the Prussian border and executed for treason. Indeed, on the one hand Grumbkow spied for the Prussians at the Viennese court, on the other hand he was bribed by Prince Eugene. There is also a rumour that Grumbkow would have poisoned Charles VI: Grumbkow wanted Maria Theresa on the throne because he saw in her a weak opponent of Prussia.

After the invasion of Prussian troops is welcomed with joy by the population in Silesia, Maria Theresa tries to alleviate the hunger among the soldiers in order to increase their motivation. Soon afterwards the Prussians also invade Bohemia. The nobility flees Vienna after numerous balls have been canceled and her own court turns away from her in mockery. Moreover, Princess Karolina falls ill with smallpox, from which she later dies. Franz Stephan feels useless and excluded from the life of Maria Theresia, who is instead increasingly overwhelmed. However, she finds a loyal supporter in Elisa Fritz, who had previously seemed more attached to Franz Stephan, and who manages now to persuade the nobility to return to the Viennese court and to steer the mood at the court in their favour. The Prussians offer an armistice if the annexed territories are granted to Prussia, and Maria Theresia accepts. In the meantime, the longed-for male descendant Joseph is born.

The Bavarians declare war on Austria and France joins the war against the Austrians. Maria Theresa tries to raise the morale of her troops with the support of the church and promises them better equipment and food. Moreover, she also looks for support from the Hungarians: Count Nikolaus Esterházy accepts, but wants to win her heart as well. Franz Stephan is jealous and rumours circulate already at court that the Pope would be ready to annul their marriage. Esterházy realises that he cannot win the heart of Maria Theresa and that she would only sacrifice herself to him out of a sense of duty to her country. Maria Theresia presents herself in front of the Hungarian Diet as a defenseless mother and wife who appeals to the courage of men. Esterházy stands up for her in front of everybody: she receives the Hungarian support and the promise of 60,000 soldiers. Maria Theresa is finally crowned Queen of Hungary.

=== Part 3 ===
Following the loss of Silesia to Frederick II of Prussia, the armistice between Prussia and the Habsburg monarchy proved short-lived. During this period, Francis Stephen of Lorraine conducted business with Prussia, including the sale of uniforms, tents and other supplies to Frederick II. These dealings took place while Maria Theresa was working to defend the Habsburg monarchy.

Maria Theresa also pays a personal price for her commitment as head of state, because her husband Franz Stephan turns to other women. She accuses Franz Stephan of enjoying immoral gambling while they are losing the war. Franz Stephan, on the other hand, argues that the income from his immoral gambling would finance their moral war.

Maria Theresa suspects that her mother-in-law, Élisabeth Charlotte d’Orléans, at the moment in Vienna under the pretense of visiting her grandchildren, is actually an informant for the French king. With the help of Elisa Fritz, however, Maria Theresia manages to arrange the betrothal between her sister Maria Anna and her brother-in-law Charles Alexander. While Franz Stephan initially does not believe in the accusations against his mother, she exposes herself to her sons, scolding them for having chosen the wrong side and later fleeing from Vienna.

In her desperate military situation, Maria Theresa seems to be throwing her own values and morals overboard. Contrary to the advice of her advisors, she seeks military support from Baron von der Trenck, who is known for his boldness, but also for his cruelty. He promises her to win back the Bavarian lands for her and to bring her the Nuremberg Egg as a trophy. Later, news arrives that the situation in the western front is changing, Trenck is marching towards Munich and the Bavarians are fleeing. However, there are also reports of looting in Bavaria committed by his Pandurs. Moreover, Trenck does not take prisoners, who could serve as objects of exchange for Austrian's captured nobles, but instead has them executed immediately, against the common rules of war. The Bavarians are finally defeated and Trenck sends Maria Theresa the Nuremberg Egg.

=== Part 4 ===
Trenck's campaigns brought the desired military success, but Maria Theresa has to recognise that it also opened the door to crime and cruelty: Trenck's Pandurs inflicted hardship and misery to the civilian population, raping and murdering them. Maria Theresa is harshly judging him but also herself. From now on, morality becomes her top priority and she set up a chastity committee, headed by Father Johannes. In the most severe cases, prostitutes and sinners risk being deported to Banat by boats.

On the orders of the Papal Nuncio, Father Johannes send spies also to the Palace of Franz Stephan in Wallnerstrasse, who is suspected of being the Grand Master of the Freemasons. He is also suspected to make business with Protestant countries, to the disapproval of the Catholic Church. Maria Theresa decrees strict Catholicism morals for those around her, and her police takes action against gambling and prostitution. She decides also to meet her husband, from whom she feels increasingly alienated and betrayed.

After Maria Theresia proposes to Franz Stephan a private separation, so that they should only meet on official occasions, he confesses to her that he is the Grand Master of Freemasons. The Jesuits monitor his palace on Wallnerstrasse only in order to draw up a list of Freemasons. The list of women drawn up by the Jesuits, who Maria Theresia thought were Franz Stephan's lovers, consists instead of wives of foreign bankers, for whom it was too dangerous to see him in person, so that they send their wives instead. The money that he raised so that Maria Theresa can finance the war comes from deals with Prussia and Friedrich II.

Trenck is brought before the Imperial Court for murdering nobles, hiding booty, colluding with the enemy, accepting bribes, rape and looting. Maria Theresa later learns from Father Johannes that he died in prison after having written his will, having summoned a priest to confess, and having informed him that he would die at noon the next day. In a letter to Maria Theresia Trenck writes that he had no regrets and that he could fully enjoy his life in battle, but did not want to live in prison.

The Spanish inquisitors accuse Franz Stephan's friends of sodomy and Satanism and demand for them the death by burning. Franz Stephan tries to buy them out and smuggle them across the border: dolls are to be burned in their place, but the church will nevertheless excommunicate them. Maria Theresa then promises to withdraw some of the measures that she had introduced under the influence of Father Johannes. After Maria Theresia and Franz Stephan get closer again, Maria Theresia confesses to her younger sister Maria Anna that she is pregnant from an affair. Intimidating her with the prospect of future damnation for her own first baby, Father Johannes extracts this secret from Maria Anna during her confession. Blackmailing Maria Theresia, Father Johannes becomes then a permanent member of the war council and field vicar of the Habsburg army. Franz Stephan is disappointed because Maria Theresa had promised to put an end to Father Johannes' ambitions.

After Maria Theresa's troops succeed in liberating Prague from the French who supported the Bavarians, the Bohemian nobles swore allegiance to Maria Theresa, who is crowned Queen of Bohemia. Maria Theresa receives news from her sister Maria Anna that her daughter was born dead: in a letter, Maria Anna accuses God and the Church. Maria Theresa subsequently deprived Father Johannes of all powers and the papal nuncio, also thanks to generous financial support from Franz Stephan, sides with Maria Theresa and downgrades Father Johannes.

== Cast ==
The cast consists of Austrian, Czech, Slovak and Hungarian actors. The actors all spoke their native language during filming and were then dubbed over depending on the country of broadcast.

| Character | 2017 | | 2019 | | 2021 |
| Character | Part I | Part II | Part III | Part IV | Part V |
|---|---|---|---|---|---|
| Maria Theresa | Marie-Luise Stockinger | Marie-Luise Stockinger | Stefanie Reinsperger | Stefanie Reinsperger | Ursula Strauss |
| Francis of Lorraine | Vojtěch Kotek | Vojtěch Kotek | Vojtěch Kotek | Vojtěch Kotek | Vojtěch Kotek |
| Elisabeth Christine of Brunswick-Wolfenbüttel | Zuzana Stivínová | Zuzana Stivínová | Zuzana Stivínová | Zuzana Stivínová | |
| Charles VI, Holy Roman Emperor | Fritz Karl | Fritz Karl | | | |
| Elisa Fritz | Tatiana Pauhofová | Tatiana Pauhofová | Tatiana Pauhofová | Tatiana Pauhofová | Tatiana Pauhofová |
| Prince Eugene of Savoy | Karl Markovics | Karl Markovics | | | |
| Friedrich Wilhelm von Grumbkow | Zoltán Rátóti | Zoltán Rátóti | | | |
| Wilhelmine Colloredo | Nathalie Köbli | Nathalie Köbli | | | |
| Jean Baptiste Bassand | Jan Budař | Jan Budař | | | |
| Count Schwarz | Martin Myšička | Martin Myšička | | | |
| Heinrich Josef von Auersperg | Karel Polišenský | Karel Polišenský | | | |
| Friedrich Wilhelm von Haugwitz | Václav Baur | Václav Baur | | | |
| Gundaker Thomas Starhemberg | Antonín Hardt | Antonín Hardt | | | |
| Paul Esterházy | Ervin Nagy | Ervin Nagy | | | |
| Philip von Sitzendorf | Alois Švehlík | Alois Švehlík | | | |
| Maria Anna of Austria | Anna Posch | Anna Posch | Anna Posch | Anna Posch | |
| Marie Karoline von Fuchs-Mollard | Julia Stemberger | Julia Stemberger | Lenka Vlasáková | Lenka Vlasáková | |
| Johann Christoph von Bartenstein | Dominik Warta | Dominik Warta | Dominik Warta | Dominik Warta | |
| Nicholas Esterházy | Bálint Adorjáni | Bálint Adorjáni | Bálint Adorjáni | Bálint Adorjáni | |
| Gottfried Philipp Spannagel | Cornelius Obonya | Cornelius Obonya | Cornelius Obonya | Cornelius Obonya | |
| Count Kinsky | Alexander Bárta | Alexander Bárta | Alexander Bárta | Alexander Bárta | |
| Friedrich August von Harrach-Rohrau | Jiří Dvořák | Jiří Dvořák | Jiří Dvořák | Jiří Dvořák | |
| Mademoiselle de Chartres | Zuzana Mauréry | Zuzana Mauréry | Zuzana Mauréry | Zuzana Mauréry | |
| Prince Charles Alexander of Lorraine | | | Bořek Joura | Bořek Joura | |
| Pater Johannes | | | Johannes Krisch | Johannes Krisch | |
| Baron von der Trenck | | | Philipp Hochmair | Philipp Hochmair | |
| Emanuel Silva-Tarouca | | | Peter Kočiš | Peter Kočiš | Peter Kočiš |
| Archduke Joseph | | | | | Aaron Friesz |
| Maximilian Ulrich von Kaunitz | | | | | Stanislav Majer |
| Princess Isabella of Parma | | | | | Jana Kvantiková |
| Maria Josepha of Bavaria | | | | | Tereza Marečková |

== Historical inaccuracies ==
- The Prussian Marshal Grumbkow was not executed, but died of natural causes.
- There is no evidence of the infidelity of Maria Theresa. An affair and the birth of an illegitimate child play an important role in the 4th part, but hardly correspond to the facts, as Maria Theresa loved her husband very much despite his affairs.

== Viewership ==
Total viewership in different countries (in million)
| TV | 2017 | | 2019 | | 2021 | Source |
| TV | Part I | Part II | Part III | Part IV | Part V | Source |
|---|---|---|---|---|---|---|
| (Czech Republic) ČT1 | 2.037 | 2.157 | 1.516 | 1.435 | 1.462 | |
| (Austria) ORF 2 | 1.122 | 1.177 | 0.562 | 0.544 | 0.659 | |
| (Slovakia) Jednotka | 0.772 | 0.789 | 0.361 | 0.375 | 0.346 | |
| (Hungary) Duna TV / M5 | 0.314 | 0.415 | n/a | | | |

Audience share for total viewership in different countries
| TV | 2017 | | 2019 | | 2021 | Source |
| TV | Part I | Part II | Part III | Part IV | Part V | Source |
|---|---|---|---|---|---|---|
| (Czech Republic) ČT1 | 42% | 47% | 35.9% | 34.6% | 34.8% | |
| (Austria) ORF 2 | 36% | 38% | 20% | 19% | 22% | |
| (Slovakia) Jednotka | 28.8% | 29.4% | 16% | 16.6% | 13.9% | |
| (Hungary) Duna TV / M5 | 7.6% | 9.8% | n/a | | | |

Note:

- Each broadcaster publish different target demographic (in case of total viewership) for their respective market: Hungarian: 4+, Austrian and Slovak: 12+, Czech: 15+
