= SOKO Linz =

Austrian crime television series

- Genre: Police procedural
- Written by: various
- Directed by: Markus Engel; Martin Kinkel; Claudia Jüptner-Jonstorff
- Starring: Katharina Stemberger; Daniel Gawlowski; Anna Hausburg; Damyan Andreev; Alexander Pschill; Miriam Hie; Paula Hainberger
- Composers: Tobias Alexander Ratka; René Münzer; Claus Quidde
- Country of origin: Austria
- Original language: German
- No. of seasons: 4
- No. of episodes: 49

Production
- Executive producer: Florian Gebhardt
- Producers: Gregor Schmalix; Stephan Aichinger; Helmut Lehner; Dagmar Ungureit
- Cinematography: Thomas Kürzl
- Editor: Alexandra Löwy
- Running time: 45 minutes
- Production company: Gebhardt Productions

Original release
- Network: ORF
- Release: 1 February 2022 – present
- Network: ZDF
- Release: 21 October 2022 – present

SOKO Linz is an Austrian police procedural television series that premiered on 1 February 2022. A collaboration between ORF and the German broadcaster ZDF, it is the eleventh offshoot of SOKO München, launched in 1978. "SOKO" is an abbreviation of the German word Sonderkommission, which means "special investigative team". The show, which replaces the first Austrian incarnation of the SOKO franchise, SOKO Kitzbühel, revolves around a police team that investigates murders and other serious crimes in the Austria-Germany-Czechia tripoint, centred on the city of Linz. The series has been approved for a second season, and filming began on 4 May 2022.

== Cast and characters ==
| Actor | Character | Rank |
|---|---|---|
| Katharina Stemberger | Johanna "Joe" Haizinger | Chief inspector |
| Daniel Gawlowski | Ben Halberg | Chief inspector |
| Anna Hausburg | Nele Oldendorf | Chief inspector |
| Damyan Andreev | Aleks Malenov | Department assistant |
| Alexander Pschill | Dr. Richard "Richie" Vitek | Coroner |
| Miriam Hie | Yara Nejem | Office manager |
| Paula Hainberger | Emilia Ertl | |

== See also ==
- List of Austrian television series
