= Lists of actresses =

These are lists of actresses. Many actresses are also included in lists of actors.

== By nationality ==
- List of Albanian actors § Female actors
- List of American film actresses
- List of American television actresses
- List of Austrian actresses
- List of British actresses
- List of Bangladeshi actresses
- List of Brazilian actors § Actresses
- List of Burmese actresses
- List of Canadian actresses
- List of Chilean actresses
- List of Chinese actresses
- List of Czech actresses
- List of Filipino actresses
- List of Indian film actresses
- List of Indian television actresses
- See also Category:Lists of Indian actresses
- List of Iranian actresses
- List of Italian actresses
- List of Japanese actresses
- List of Mexican actresses
- List of Nepalese actresses
- List of Nigerian actresses
- List of Pakistani actresses
- List of Romanian actresses
- List of South Korean actresses
- List of Taiwanese actresses
- List of Thai actresses
- List of Tunisian actresses

== See also ==
- List of awards for actresses
- List of film awards for lead actress
- Category:Lists of awards received by actress
