= SOKO Kitzbühel =

Austrian crime drama television series

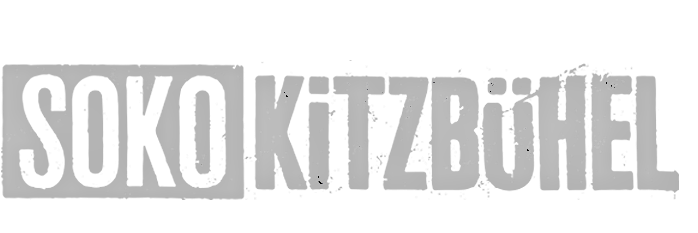
- Series logo
- Genre: Police procedural
- Written by: various
- Directed by: various
- Starring: Heinz Marecek; Andrea L'Arronge; Ferry Oellinger; Kristina Sprenger; Christine Klein; Jakob Seeböck; Julia Cencig
- Composer: various
- Country of origin: Austria
- Original language: German
- No. of seasons: 20
- No. of episodes: 263

Production
- Producer: various
- Production locations: Kitzbühel, Austria
- Cinematography: various
- Editor: various
- Running time: 45 minutes
- Production company: Gebhardt Productions

Original release
- Release: 15 November 2001 – 14 December 2021

SOKO Kitzbühel is an Austrian television series produced by ORF in collaboration with the German network ZDF. It is the third spin-off of the German crime series SOKO 5113 (SOKO München since 2015), launched in 1978. The show, which debuted on 15 November 2001 in Austria and 7 January 2003 in Germany, is set in the Tyrolean tourist centre of Kitzbühel. The last episode aired on 14 December 2021. "SOKO" is an abbreviation of the German word Sonderkommission, which means "special investigative team".

A follow-up series, SOKO Linz, began filming in May 2021.

== Synopsis ==
The story is centered on police detectives Karin Kofler (until 2014), replaced by Nina Pokorny, and Lukas Roither. The team solves complicated murder cases in and around Kitzbühel, many of which involve members of the rich and powerful, common in the resort town. Kofler's father is an amateur detective who often joins the investigations.

== Language ==
Produced primarily for a German market, the language spoken in the series is very close to High German, while in reality, Southern Bavarian is predominant in Tyrol, where Kitzbühel is located. Viennese German and some other Austrian dialects are also spoken in the series, but never the local one.

== See also ==
- List of Austrian television series
