= How to Be Normal and the Oddness of the Other World =

2025 Austrian film

- Festival release poster
- Directed by: Florian Pochlatko
- Screenplay by: Florian Pochlatko
- Produced by: Arash T. Riahi; Sabine Gruber
- Starring: Luisa-Céline Gaffron; Elke Winkens; Cornelius Obonya; Harald Krassnitzer; Fanny Altenburger
- Cinematography: Adrian Bidron
- Edited by: Julia Drack
- Music by: Rosa Anschütz
- Production company: Golden Girls Film Production
- Distributed by: FILMLADEN Filmverleih
- Release dates: 16 February 2025 (Berlinale); 19 September 2025 (Theaters)
- Running time: 90 minutes
- Country: Austria
- Language: German

How to Be Normal and the Oddness of the Other World is a 2025 drama film directed by Florian Pochlatko in his directorial debut. The film follows Pia, who is freshly released from psychiatric hospital, living with her parents she is trying to rebuild her life, as she juggles jobs, heartbreak, her meds and social stigma and searching for equilibrium.

It was selected in Perspectives at the 75th Berlin International Film Festival and was screened on 16 the February 2025.

== Summary ==
Pia, a young woman recently discharged from a psychiatric facility, struggles to reintegrate into her old life. Returning to her childhood home and working at her father’s office, she feels alienated—misunderstood by her parents, ex-boyfriend Joni, and colleagues. Only 12-year-old Lenni, who shares her sense of entrapment, connects with her. All have different expectations from her. As Pia navigates societal expectations, medication, and self-doubt, she undergoes a startling transformation—growing to 20 meters tall. Is this a psychotic break or a powerful awakening? And who gets to define what is normal? Is it okay not to be okay!?

== Cast ==
- Luisa-Céline Gaffron as Pia
- Elke Winkens as Elfie
- Cornelius Obonya as Klaus
- Harald Krassnitzer as Inspector Moritz Fuchs-Müller
- Felix Pöchhacker as Joni
- Lion Thomas Tatzber as Lenni
- Wesley Joseph Byrne as Ned
- David Scheid as Till
- Nancy Mensah-Offei as Julia
- Oliver Rosskopf as Paul
- Jutta Fastian: Dana Schaller
- Dagmar Kutzenberger as Mrs. Weixner
- Martina Poel as Lenni's Mother
- Christian Holzmann as Policeman
- Gregor Kohlhofer as Employee
- Tamara Semzov as Girlfriend
- Gordan Kukic as Policeman
- Fanny Altenburger as Patient
- Ruchi Bajaj as Doctor
- Reinhold G. Moritz as Psychiatric Physician

== Production ==
The film directed by Florian Pochlatko is produced by Golden Girls Film Production, with Arash T. Riahi and Sabine Gruber as producers and with the support of the Austrian Film Institute, the Vienna Film Fund, the Province of Lower Austria and Cine Art, and the Austrian Broadcasting Corporation acting as television partner. Filmladen is the distributors of the film.

Principal photography began on 17 April 2023 on locations in Vienna, Lower Austria. Filming ended on 26 May 2023 in Austria.

== Release ==
How to Be Normal and the Oddness of the Other World had its world premiere on 16 February 2025, as part of the 75th Berlin International Film Festival, in Perspectives.

The film will be theatrical released in Austria on 19 September 2025 by Filmladen.

== Accolades ==
The film selected in the newly formed Perspectives competition will compete for Best First Feature Award.

Award	Date of ceremony	Category	Recipient	Result	Ref.
Berlin International Film Festival	23 February 2025	GWFF Best First Feature Award	How to Be Normal and the Oddness of the Other World	Nominated	
