= Julia Cencig =

Austrian actress (born 1972)

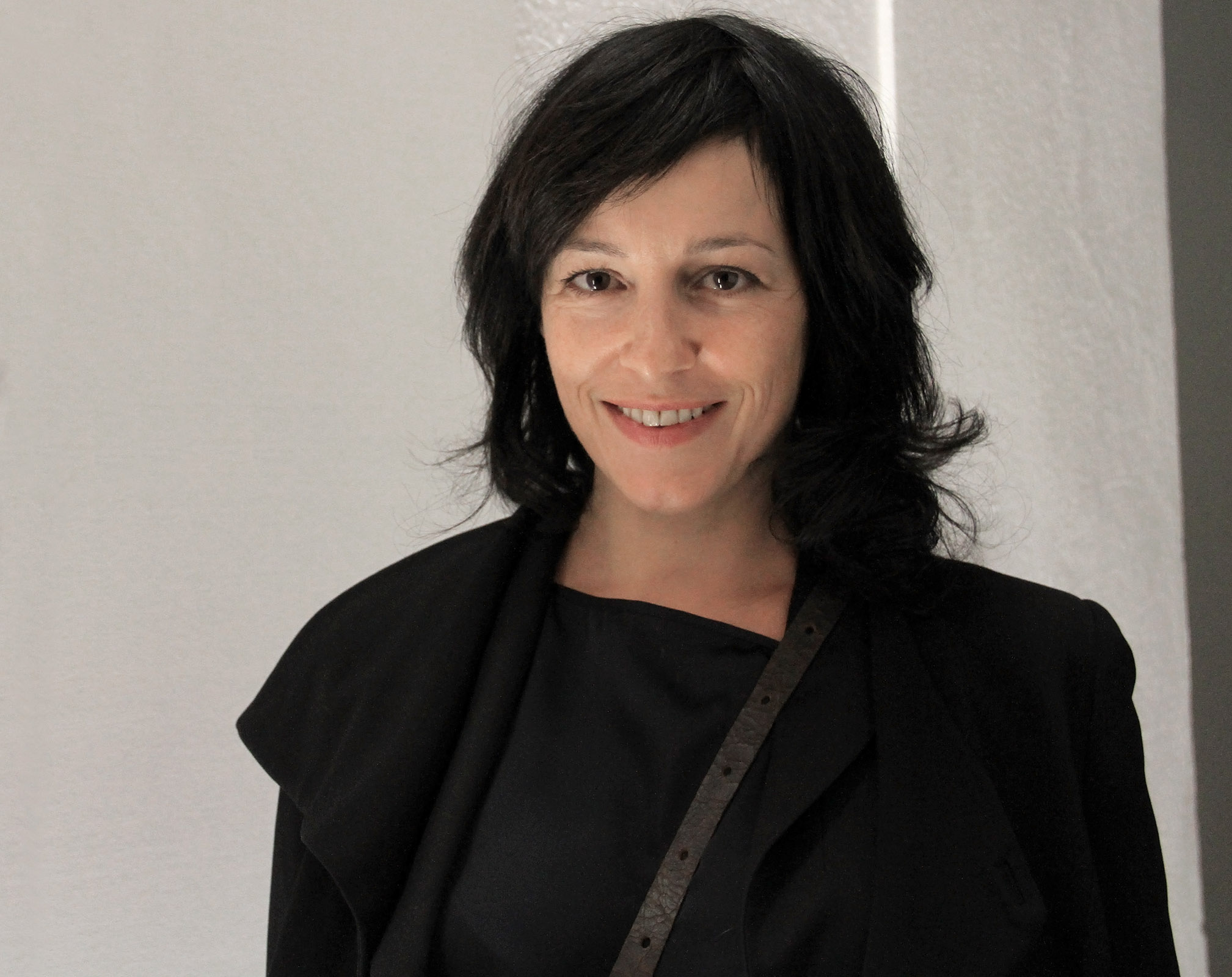
- Born: 18 September 1972 (age 53); Salzburg, Austria
- Citizenship: Austria
- Occupation: Actress
- Years active: 1984-present

Julia Cencig (born 18 September 1972) is an Austrian actress active mainly in television and theater; her main roles on the small screen include those in the series Medicopter 117 - Jedes Leben zählt, SOKO Kitzbühel and Das Glück dieser Erde.

== Biography ==
Julia Cencig was born in Salzburg on 18 September 1972, the fourth of five children of Norbert and Elisabeth Cencig. She's the younger sister of director Michael Cencig, and it was her brother who instigated her debut as a child in the world of cinema, assigning her the leading role in the first film he directed. Later she decided to pursue acting as a career, and after graduating she attended the acting school of the Volkstheater in Vienna, after which she was engaged by that theatre company.

From 1999 to 2007, she was one of the main performers in the television series Medicopter 117 - Jedes Leben zählt, where she played the role of helicopter pilot Gina Aigner, and from 2001 to 2005 she was in the cast of the series Schlosshotel Orth, where she played the role of Lisa. Meanwhile, in theatre, she starred as Lulu in the drama of the same name by Frank Wedekind; this role earned her the Skarl Kraup award and a nomination for the Nestroy award for best emerging actress. Subsequently, in 2011 she was part of the main cast of the series Das Glück dieser Erde, where she played the role of Birgit Gross.

Starting in 2014, she was the protagonist, alongside Jakob Seeböck and replacing Kristina Sprenger in the television series SOKO Kitzbühel, where until 2021, when the series concluded, she played the role of lieutenant Nina Pokorny. This role earned her a nomination in the Prix Romy Schneider for favorite actress in a television series.

== Selected filmography ==
=== Cinema ===
- Wie die Zeit vergeht, directed by Michael Cencig (1984)
- Giulia Super, directed by Michael Cencig (1992)
- Home Run, directed by Ernst Kaufmann (2001)
- Arabesken um Frosch, directed byi Paul Harather (2001)
- The White Horse Inn, directed by Christian Theede (2013)
- Harri Pinter, Drecksau, directed by Andreas Schmied (2016)

=== Television ===
- Ein Anfang von etwas, directed by Nikolaus Leytner - film TV (1994)
- Medicopter 117 - Jedes Leben zählt - TV series, 35 episodes (1999-2007)
- Schlosshotel Orth - TV series, 41 episodes (2001-2005)
- Kronprinz Rudolf, directed by Robert Dornhelm - TV film (2006)
- Vitasek? - TV series, 8 episodes (2010)
- Der Bergdoktor - TV series, 4 episodes (2011)
- Das Glück dieser Erde - TV series, 13 episodes (2011)
- Schnell ermittelt - TV series, 9 episodes (2011-2012)
- Die Rosenheim-Cops - TV series, episode 11x19 (2012)
- Die Lottosieger - TV series, 5 episodes (2012)
- Die Bergretter - TV, series episode 01x08 (2014)
- BÖsterreich - TV series, episode 01x06 (2014)
- Die Detektive - TV series, episode 01x08 (2014)
- Steirerblut, directed by Wolfgang Murnberger - TV film (2014)
- SOKO Kitzbühel - TV series, 94 episodes (2014-2021)
- Tatort - TV series, episode 1110 (2019)
- Die Toten vom Bodensee - TV series, episode 01x14 (2022)
- Der Wien-Krimi: Blind ermittelt - Tod im Prater, directed by Katharina Mückstein - TV film (2022)
