= Christa Schwertsik =

Austrian singer and actress

- Born: 1941 (age 83–84); Breslau, Germany
- Occupation(s): Actress, singer, director, university lecturer
- Children: Julia Stemberger; Katharina Stemberger
- Relatives: Fanny Altenburger (granddaughter)

Christa Schwertsik (born 1941) is an Austrian singer, actress, director and university lecturer.

== Life and career ==
Schwertsik attended grammar school in Vienna and then studied psychology at the University of Vienna. She received her vocal training from Hedda and Edwin Szamosi and Ruthilde Boesch. She also took acting lessons from Dorothea Neff and Eva Zilcher in Vienna.

As a singer, actress and reciter, she has had numerous appearances and concerts at home and abroad - especially with songs and chansons of the 20th century - at the Berliner Festspiele, Vienna Festival, Bregenzer Festspiele, Wien Modern, Aspekte Salzburg and Almeida Festival London among others, as well as at the Musica Nova Festival Brisbane. Since 1986 she has presented numerous musical and theatrical solo programs. From 1984, Schwertsik taught for many years at the University of Music and Performing Arts Vienna.

Another focus of her work was family productions, where she took part in theater productions with her daughters Julia and Katharina Stemberger and her husband Kurt Schwertsik. "Liebe in dunklen Zeiten" from Yehoshua Sobol or "Mütter" from Franz Wittenbrink. In addition, she took part in numerous readings, radio and television productions, as well as record and CD recordings and carried out her own directing work.

== Personal life ==
Schwertsik's first marriage was to tropical medicine specialist Heinrich Stemberger. They had three daughters, Julia, Katharina and Ina Stemberger. She married composer Kurt Schwertsik in 1972, with whom she lives and works in Vienna.
