= Christian Altenburger =

Austrian violinist and teacher

Christian Altenburger (born 7 September 1957) is an Austrian classical violinist.

== Life and career ==
Christian Altenburger was born in Heidelberg. He is the son of the violinist Alfred Altenburger. He studied at the University of Music and Performing Arts Vienna while still at school. After graduating, he began studying at the Juilliard School in New York in Dorothy DeLay's class, on the recommendation of Zubin Mehta. He made his debut as a soloist at the Wiener Musikverein in 1976. Further engagements as a soloist followed in concerts with orchestras such as the Vienna Philharmonic, the Berlin Philharmonic, the London Symphony Orchestra, the New York Philharmonic, and the Chicago Symphony Orchestra under conductors such as Claudio Abbado, Bernard Haitink, James Levine, Zubin Mehta and Wolfgang Sawallisch. Altenburger is a regular participant in international chamber music festivals such as Santa Fe, Kuhmo and Stavanger, and at the Pablo Casals Festival in Prades. He is also the organizer of various chamber music events. He was married to the actress Julia Stemberger, by whom he had a daughter, Fanny Altenburger.

From 1990 to 2001 he taught as professor of violin at the Hochschule für Musik, Theater und Medien Hannover. From 1999 to 2005 he was artistic director of the Musiktage Mondsee together with Julia Stemberger. Professor Altenburger is currently married to British violinist Lydia Altenburger (née Westcombe-Evans). The couple married in 2010 and have 2 sons, Nicolas (born 2011) and Severin (2012).

In 2001 he received a professorship at the Vienna University of Music. Since 2003 he has been artistic director of the chamber music festival Schwäbischer Frühling, and since 2006 of the Loisiarte in Langenlois.

== Awards ==
- 2018: Niederösterreichischer Kulturpreis – Recognition award in the Musik category.

== Altenburger's violins ==
During a burglary in Altenburger's apartment on 29 May 2007, thieves stole a supposed Stradivari violin from the year 1680 worth around 2.5 million euros and a Vuillaume violin worth around 120,000 euros, which were found undamaged by the police on 5 June 2007. The three perpetrators were arrested and sentenced to six and five years respectively. They had committed ten burglaries in May 2007 alone. During the trial, an expert was unable to confirm the authenticity of the Stradivarius. The violin was smaller than a typical Stradivarius, probably a violin from the house of Amati. Three or four masters from Cremona could be considered as manufacturers. The value could therefore be set at 500,000 euros.
