= 11er Haus =

- Created by: Alfred Dorfer
- Country of origin: Austria
- No. of seasons: 1
- No. of episodes: 5

Production
- Running time: 45 minutes

Original release
- Network: ORF
- Release: 25 November 2005 – December 2005

11er Haus is a 2005 Austrian comedy miniseries by Alfred Dorfer and Harald Sicheritz. Five episodes were produced by ORF, focusing on a Viennese tenement house and its inhabitants and is a microcosm for over five decades of political and economic changes in Austria between 1955 and 2005.

In 2021 the series began streaming on the online platform Flimmit.

== Cast ==
- Julia Stemberger as Christl Steiner
- Johannes Silberschneider as Herr Fischer
- Wolfgang Böck as Karl Toperzer
- Erika Mottl as Mama Steiner
- Nicholas Ofczarek as Franz Moser
- Alexander Lutz as Lukas
- Marie-Christine Friedrich as Sabine
- Michael Pascher as Josef
- Matthias Franz Stein as Fritz
- Wolfram Berger as Gaskassier Lehner
- Gabriela Benesch as Hannelore Moser
- Bettina Redlich as Grete Toperzer
- Eva Billisich as Kathi Brenner
- Simon Schwarz as Rupert Quester
- Sabrina White as Isabella Quester
- Michael Ostrowski as Helmut
- Gertraud Jesserer as Emmi Horvath

== Episodes ==
- 1: Manderlradio
- 2: Freie Liebe
- 3: Cordoba
- 4: Funkschatten
- 5: Abschlussfest

== See also ==
- List of Austrian television series
