= Medicopter 117 – Jedes Leben zählt =

German-Austrian television series

- Logo
- Theme music composer: Sylvester Levay
- Countries of origin: Germany; Austria
- No. of seasons: 7
- No. of episodes: Pilot Movie + 81 Episodes

Original release
- Release: 11 January 1998 – 28 September 2008

"Medicopter 117 – Jedes Leben zählt“ (English: Medicopter 117 – Every life counts) is a German language television series that RTL and ORF broadcast. Medicopter 117 has seven seasons in 81 episodes and a pilot movie.

Medicopter 117 started in Germany and Austria on 11 January 1998 with the pilot movie “Der Kronzeuge”. Over 6.67 million people watched the series in Germany. The series ended in 2002.

== Broadcasters ==
Germany RTL

Austria ORF 1

Hungary RTL KLUB

Czech Republic TV NOVA TV PRIMA

Slovakia JEDNOTKA TV JOJ

Poland TVN

Ukraine NTN

Lithuania TV3

Latvia TV3

Estonia TV3

Russia REN TV

Romania AXN

Bulgaria DIEMA

France TF1

Belgium RTL TVI

Netherlands RTL 4

Spain CUATRO

Macedonia TELMA

United Kingdom CHANNEL 5

Canada SÉRIES+

Iran TV5

== Description ==
The Medicopter 117 is a fictitious rescue helicopter somewhere in the German Alps whose crews rescue people in danger.

The most expensive episode was the last episode in the first season. In the episode “Der Absturz”, a helicopter crashes in the mountains after a collision with a cable car rope. The crash sequence took one minute and cost 1 million DM to film.

The episode "Geisterflieger" (Insecticide) was originally set to air on 11 September 2001. This episode was supposed to be the first one of season four. Because of the episode's parallels to the attacks of 9/11, it was broadcast on a later date.

But the producers broadcast "Geisterflieger" on 17 September 2002 because its plot was crucial for the entire series. The paramedic Enrico Contini had his first appearance there. Some of the plotlines had to be refilmed because some of the former characters were gone and new ones had appeared in the series. So there are two different versions of this episode. The fourth season began with the episode "Rettet Susi" (Save Susi) on 18 September 2001.

From 2008 to 2012, all the Medicopter 117 seasons were released on DVD.

The series aired in several countries with the original German audio, but with English subtitles. It ran in United Kingdom on Channel 5.

== Helicopters ==
The Medicopter 117 is a BK 117 made by the German helicopter manufacturer Messerschmitt-Bölkow-Blohm. The BK 117 has a special color scheme in red and yellow.

Medicopter 117 used two helicopters. The producers borrowed the first helicopter (registration D-HECE) from the DRF (Deutsche Rettungsflugwacht). When they did not use the D-HECE for the series, it flew real rescue missions at DRF locations. The DRF had ended its cooperation by the beginning of the fifth season. Later, the D-HECE was painted in the DRF colors (red and white).

The second helicopter (registration D-HEOE) was a former police helicopter in Baden-Württemberg. After its Medicopter career, the D-HEOE flew rescue missions for different operators like DRF, IFA (Internationale Flugambulanz) and the Austrian operator Flymed. This helicopter was used for sightseeing flights a few times. Today, the D-HEOE serves as an offshore helicopter in the North Sea.

== List of episodes ==
Pilot Movie
#	Original airdate	Title
0	11.01.1998	Der Kronzeuge (The Main Witness)

Season 1
#	Original airdate	Episode title	Episode number
1	12.01.1998	Tödliche Dosis (Deadly Dose)	01
2	19.01.1998	Die Geiselnahme (Hostage Situation)	02
3	26.01.1998	Kurzschluss (Short Circuit)	03
4	02.02.1998	Flug in die Hölle (Flight to Hell)	04
5	09.02.1998	Inferno ohne Ausweg (Inferno with No Way Out)	05
6	23.02.1998	Blinde Wut (Blind Rage)	06
7	02.03.1998	Gift in den Adern (Poison in the Veins)	07
8	09.03.1998	Der Absturz (The Crash)	08

Season 2
#	Original airdate	Episode title	Episode number
1	14.09.1999	Über dem Abgrund (Above the Abyss)	09
2	14.09.1999	Der Bankraub (The Bank Robbery)	10
3	21.09.1999	Nasses Grab (Wet Grave)	11
4	28.09.1999	Viren an Bord (Viruses Onboard)	12
5	05.10.1999	Blinder Alarm (Blind Alarm)	13
6	12.10.1999	Die falsche Maßnahme (The Wrong Method)	14
7	19.10.1999	Knockout	15
8	01.11.1998	Schulbus in den Tod (School Bus on the Way to Death)	16
9	02.11.1999	Gejagt (Hunted)	17
10	09.11.1999	Unter Verdacht (Under Suspicion)	18
11	16.11.1999	Mission ohne Ausweg (Mission with No Return)	19
12	23.11.1999	Das kalte Herz (The Cold Heart)	20
13	30.11.1999	In letzter Sekunde (At the Last Second)	21

Season 3
#	Original airdate	Episode title	Episode number
1	14.03.2000	Irrfahrt am Himmel (Odyssey in the Sky)	22
2	21.03.2000	Die Todesfalle (Death Trap)	23
3	28.03.2000	Zwischen Leben und Tod (Between Life and Death)	24
4	04.04.2000	Die Feuertaufe (Baptism of Fire)	25
5	11.04.2000	Fahrt zur Hölle (Trip to Hell)	26
6	18.04.2000	Kidnapping	27
7	25.04.2000	Fehler im System (System Error)	28
8	02.05.2000	Gehetzt (Hunted)	29
9	09.05.2000	Die rollende Bombe (The Rolling Bomb)	30
10	16.05.2000	Todessprung (Leap of Death)	31
11	23.05.2000	Horror	32
12	30.05.2000	Bodenlos (Bottomless)	33
13	06.06.2000	Corrers Rache (Correr's Revenge)	34

Special Episode
#	Original airdate	Episode title	Episode number
/	/	Geisterflieger (Ghost Flight)	/

Season 4
#	Original airdate	Episode title	Episode number
1	18.09.2001	Rettet Susi (Save Susi)	35
2	25.09.2001	Geld gegen Leben (Money Vs. Life)	36
3	02.10.2001	Tödliches Wissen (Deadly Knowledge)	37
4	09.10.2001	Liebe oder Tod (Love or Death)	38
5	16.10.2001	Super-Gau (Major Accident)	39
6	23.10.2001	Mobbing (Bullying)	40
7	30.10.2001	Kokain (Cocaine)	41
8	06.11.2001	Mr. Radio	42
9	13.11.2001	Die einzige Zeugin (The Only Witness)	43
10	20.11.2001	Lebendig begraben (Buried Alive)	44
11	27.11.2001	Kamikaze	45
12	04.12.2001	Auf der Flucht (On the Run)	46

Season 5
#	Original airdate	Episode title	Episode number
1	12.03.2002	Der Zug (The Train)	47
2	19.03.2002	Flucht ohne Wiederkehr (Escape with No Return)	48
3	26.03.2002	Plutonium	49
4	02.04.2002	Höhenangst (Fear of Heights)	50
5	09.04.2002	Inferno	51
6	16.04.2002	No Risk, No Fun	52
7	17.09.2002	Geisterflieger (Ghost Flight)	53
8	24.09.2002	Verschollen (Vanished)	54
9	01.10.2002	Rufmord (Character Assassination)	55
10	08.10.2002	Im Labyrinth (In the Maze)	56
11	15.10.2002	Geldtransport (Money Transport)	57
12	22.10.2002	Die Flammenfalle (Firetrap)	58
13	29.10.2002	Rache um jeden Preis (Revenge at All Costs)	59
14	12.11.2002	Blinde Passagiere (Stowaways)	60

Season 6
#	Original airdate	Episode title	Episode number
1	07.10.2003	Bodyguard	61
2	14.10.2003	Blitzschlag (Thunderbolt)	62
3	21.10.2003	Verschüttet (Buried Alive)	63
4	28.10.2003	Das Feuerwerk (Fireworks)	64
5	18.11.2003	Falsche Zeit, falscher Ort (Wrong Place, Wrong Time)	65
6	25.11.2003	Freier Fall (Freefall)	66
7	02.12.2003	Blutige Spende (Bloody Donation)	67
8	09.12.2003	Vier Elemente (Four Elements)	68
9	20.07.2006	Mikado	69
10	27.07.2006	Abgezockt (Ripped Off)	70
11	10.08.2006	Blindflug (Blind Flight)	71
12	17.08.2006	Flammenmeer (The Lake of Fire)	72
13	24.08.2006	Heißer Schnee (Hot Snow)	73

Season 7
#	Original airdate	Episode title	Episode number
1	31.08.2006	Flug ins Ungewisse (Flight into the Unknown)	74
2	13.07.2008	Spiel mit dem Tod (Playing with Death)	75
3	31.08.2008	Feuer! (Fire!)	76
4	07.09.2008	Der Tunnel (The Tunnel)	77
5	14.09.2008	Eisiges Gefängnis (Icy Prison)	78
6	14.09.2008	Ohne Skrupel (Unscrupulous)	79
7	21.09.2008	Gegen jede Chance (Against Every Chance)	80
8	28.09.2008	Angst! (Fear!)	81

== Cancellation ==
Shortly after the end of the 7th season, RTL announced that it would no longer invest into making the series. The reason they gave was that ″We showed everything there was to show, normal rescues, rescues on ships, rescues in the mountains, rescues from helicopter to helicopter, rescues on motorway bridges and many, many dramatic scenes. Over time, this would all just become similar or even repeat itself. That's why we're forced to stay with 82 episodes in 7 seasons.″ (RTL press release)

== See also ==
- List of German television series
