= Emmy Mauthner =

Austrian theater and film actress

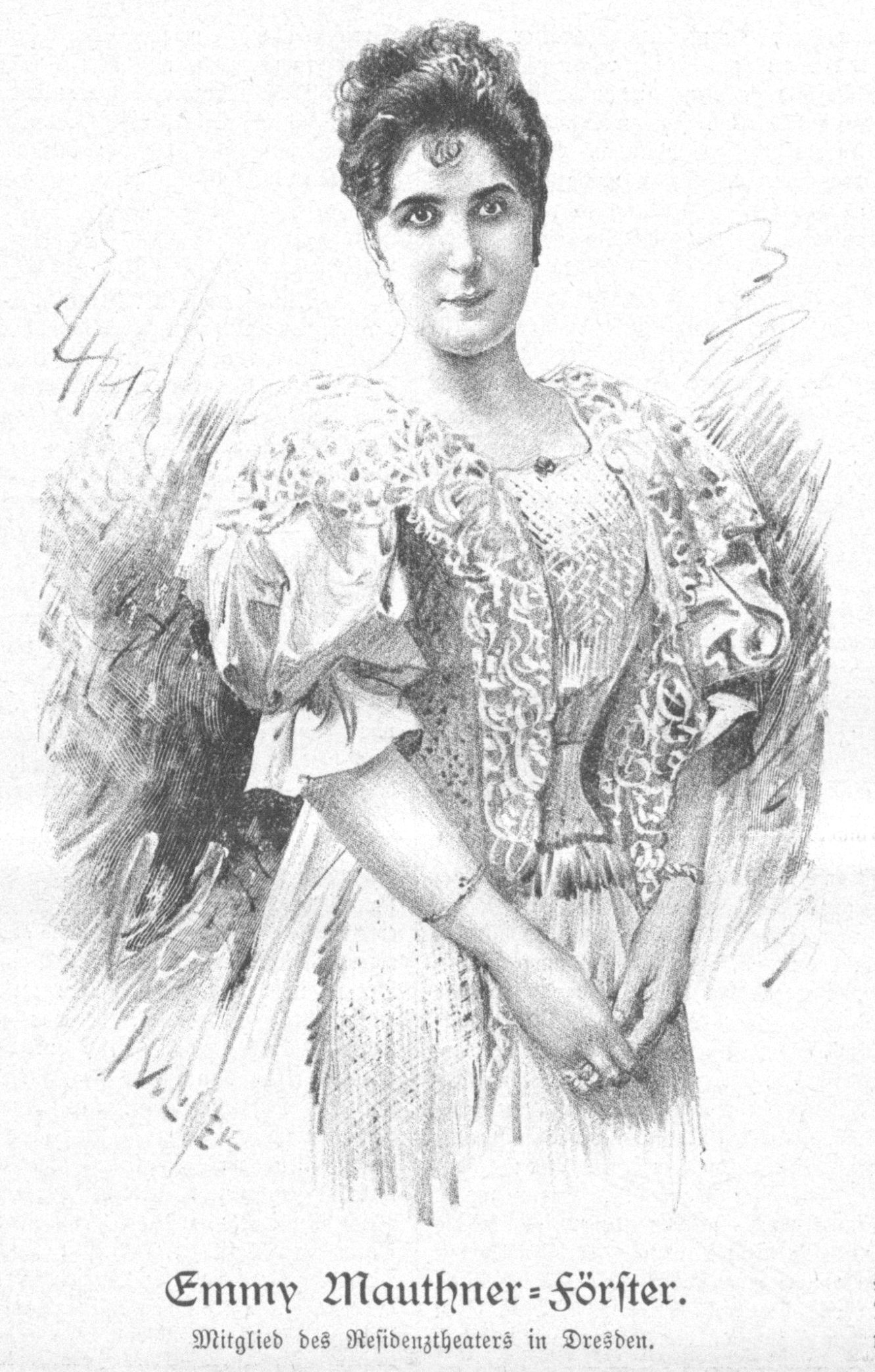
Emmy Mauthner-Förster, 1894

Emilie "Emmy" Flora Mauthner (married Emmy Förster, also Emmy Mauthner-Förster; born 1865; died 1942) was an Austrian theater and film actress.

== Life ==
Mauthner was born on November 28, 1865, in Saar, Austrian Empire (now known as Žďár nad Sázavou).

Mauthner was trained for the stage profession at the Vienna Conservatory. Her first station was the City Theater in Vienna (directed by Karl von Bukovics). She then went to Koblenz, Nuremberg and the Deutsches Theater in Budapest, where she met her husband Hans Förster, whom she married in April 1885.

She retired from the stage in 1889, and only after the early death of her husband (he died in January 1892 at the age of only 39) was she again active at the Marienbad Summer Theater beginning in 1893.

A permanent engagement from 1893 to 1895 at the Dresden Residenztheater followed. In 1897 she made a guest appearance at the Theater in der Josefstadt, was in Hamburg, and in 1899 joined the company of the Stadttheater in Brno. In the mid-1930s she was active at the Volkstheater in Vienna.

Because of her Jewish heritage the Nazis deported Emmy Mauthner-Förster from Vienna to the Theresienstadt ghetto on July 22, 1942, where she died a few months later shortly after her 77th birthday. The official cause of death was given as inflammation of the bowel.

== Film ==
- 1916: Abendsonne
- 1918: Das Geheimnis des Goldpokals
- 1924: Der Mönch von Santarem
- 1926: Der Rebell von Valencia
- 1931: Die große Liebe
- 1932: Die vom 17er Haus

== Literature ==
- Ludwig Eisenberg: Großes biographisches Lexikon der Deutschen Bühne im XIX. Jahrhundert. Verlag von Paul List, Leipzig 1903, S. 269, (Emmy Mauthner at the Internet Archive).
- Unter dem Siegel der Verschwiegenheit. In: Der Humorist (1880-1926), 20. Juni 1893, S. 04 (Online bei ANNO).
