= Stefanie Reinsperger =

Austrian actress (born 1988)

- Reinsperger in 2026
- Born: 30 January 1988; Baden bei Wien, Austria
- Education: Max Reinhardt Seminar, Vienna
- Occupation: Actress

Stefanie Reinsperger (born 30 January 1988) is an Austrian film and theater actress.

== Biography ==
Reinsperger was born on born 30 January 1988 in Baden bei Wien. She partly grew up in London, where her father worked at the Austrian Ministry of Foreign Affairs. When she was twelve, her family moved back to Biedermannsdorf, a small community south of Vienna. She attended the Vienna Business School Mödling and completed studies at the Max Reinhardt Seminar in 2011. She had already acted roles at the Vienna Volkstheater, and was then hired by the Altes Schauspielhausgebäude Düsseldorf. In 2014, she moved to the Burgtheater in Vienna. After appearances elsewhere, she moved to the Berliner Ensemble in 2017.

In 2019, she landed the lead role in Parts 3 and 4 of the Austrian-Czech historical miniseries Maria Theresia. And though she had already had many TV and film roles, she gained prominence in 2021 after being added to the Dortmund edition of the long-running popular German police procedural Tatort, playing the role of Hauptkommissarin Rosa Herzog.

In 2022, she published her first book Ganz schön wütend (Pretty Angry), which delves into her experiences as an actress including dealing with hostility about her body and appearance. Among other acting awards, she also won in 2022 the Romy Austrian acting award for most popular series actress.
