= Jean-Baptiste Bassand =

French physician (1680–1742)

Jean Baptiste Bassand
- Born: November 24, 1680; Baume-les-Dames, France
- Died: November 30, 1742 (aged 62); Vienna, Austria
- Occupation: doctor
- Known for: correspondence with Herman Boerhaave

Jean Baptiste Bassand (November 24, 1680 – November 30, 1742) was a French doctor known for his correspondence with Herman Boerhaave.

== Biography ==
Jean Baptiste was born in Baume-les-Dames, France. He was the son of merchant Michael Bassand and his wife Jeanne Marceux. His parents had seven children, two girls and five boys, of which Jean-Baptiste was the youngest. His father pushed him to study science; he then studied medicine in Besançon and Paris. Later he traveled to Naples, where he worked in the hospital. He received his doctorate in 1705 at Salerno. He continued his studies at the University of Leyden, where he was a pupil of Herman Boerhaave. The two men very regularly exchanged letters on botanical and medical topics. He then became an army surgeon in a French military hospital in Italy. Out of dissatisfaction with his French superiors, he decided to work for the Austrians. He was first a general practitioner in Vienna. In 1717, he served as a military surgeon in the imperial regiment of Prince Eugene of Savoy, during the Ottoman–Venetian War. He became a professor at the Faculty of Medicine of the University of Vienna on October 26, 1720, and, in 1724, personal physician to Léopold Joseph de Lorraine. In December 1727, he cured the latter's eldest son, François-Étienne de Lorraine, of smallpox, which earned him the title of nobility on March 23, 1728, and he became physician to the imperial court. On October 21, he also had the title of counselor at court. After also curing Leopold Joseph of Lorraine's brother, Charles-Alexandre de Lorraine, of smallpox, he received the title of Baron on October 26, 1730. He accompanied the two nobles on a journey on horseback through several European countries. They notably passed through Leyden in 1731, where the two nobles discovered the botanical garden and met the former teacher of Jean Baptiste Bassand, Herman Boerhaave.

On March 23, 1732, Bassand joined the Royal Society in London.

He died in Vienna, Austria, in 1742.

== Bibliography ==
- (la) Herman Boerhaave, Epistolæ ad Joannem Baptistam Bassand Medicum Caesareum, Vienna, Officina Krausiana, 1778; German edition: Jean Nusch, Hermann Boerhaaves Briefe an Johann Baptist Bassand, kaiserlichen Leibarzt aus dem lateinischen in die teutsche Sprache übersetzt, Frankfurt and Leipzig, Jacob Bauer, 1781
- August Hirsch and Ernst Gurlt, Biographisches Lexikon der hervorragenden Aerzte aller Zeiten und Völker, Vienna and Leipzig, 1888, Urban & Schwarzenberg, vol. 6, p. 457.
- Charles Weiss, "Bassand, Jean-Baptiste", in Ancient and Modern Universal Biography, Paris, 1834, vol 57, p. 262
