= Katharina Stemberger =

Austrian actress (born 1968)

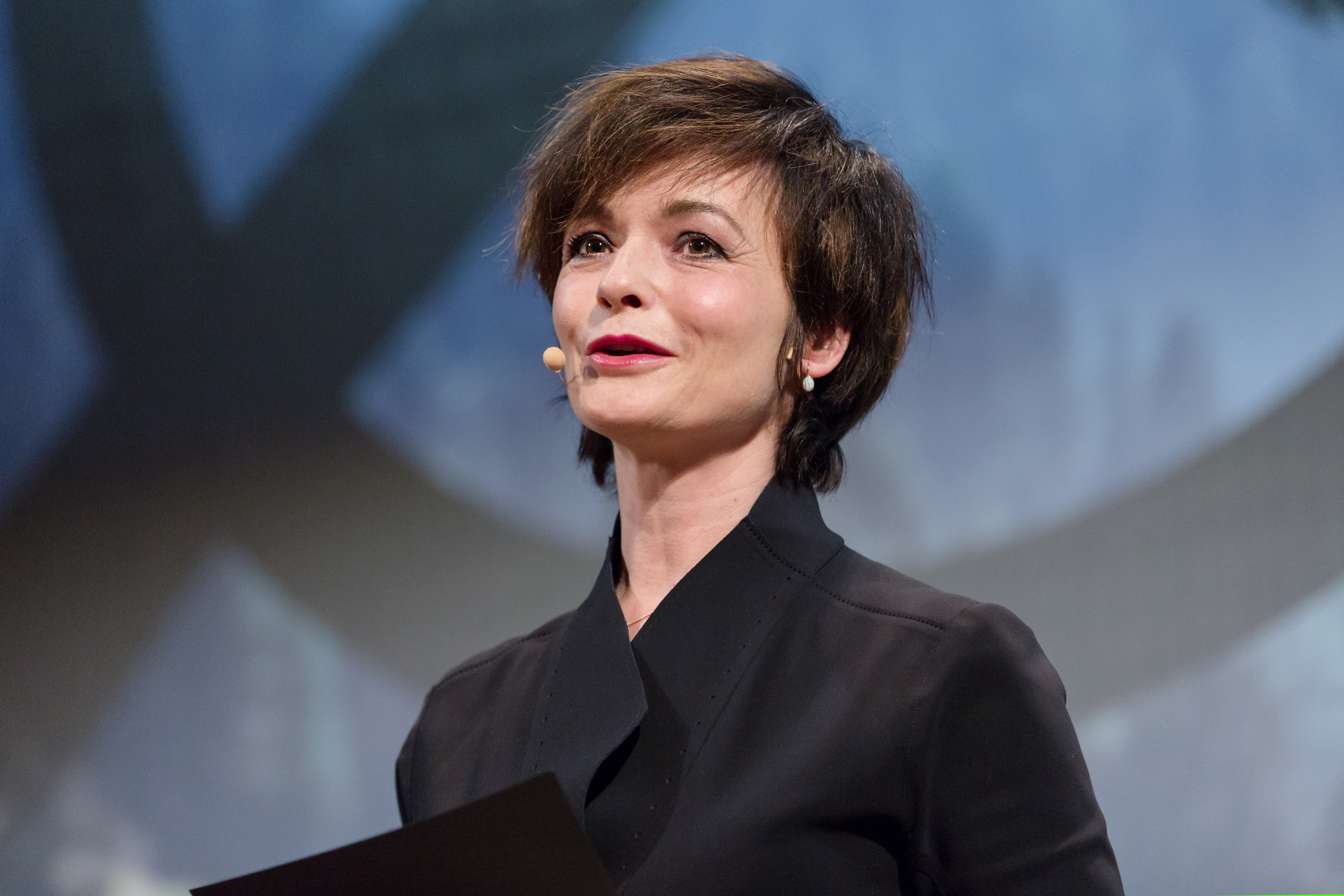
- Stemberger in 2016
- Born: 26 December 1968 (age 57); Vienna, Austria
- Occupation: Actress
- Spouse: Fabian Eder
- Children: 1

Katharina Stemberger-Eder (born 28 December 1968) is an Austrian actress.

== Early life ==
Stemberger studied cello at the conservatories in Vienna and Salzburg. After graduating in 1988, she began her acting training with Eva Zilcher. In 1996 she attended a three-month acting training at the Hollywood Acting Workshop in Los Angeles.

== Private ==
Stemberger-Eder is married to cinematographer Fabian Eder and has a daughter. She and her sister Julia Stemberger are the daughters of the tropical medicine Heinrich Stemberger and the actress Christa Schwertsik, who is married to the composer Kurt Schwertsik. Through her husband Fabian, Stemberger is the daughter-in-law of Bibiana Zeller (1928–2023) and Otto Anton Eder (1930–2004).

The couple Schwertsik and the Stemberger sisters make common theater, such. For example, with The Mikado, an operetta performed in the Volkstheater since 2008.

As a UNESCO ambassador she campaigns for the vaccine against papillomaviruses.
