= Fanny Altenburger =

Austrian actress (born 2000)

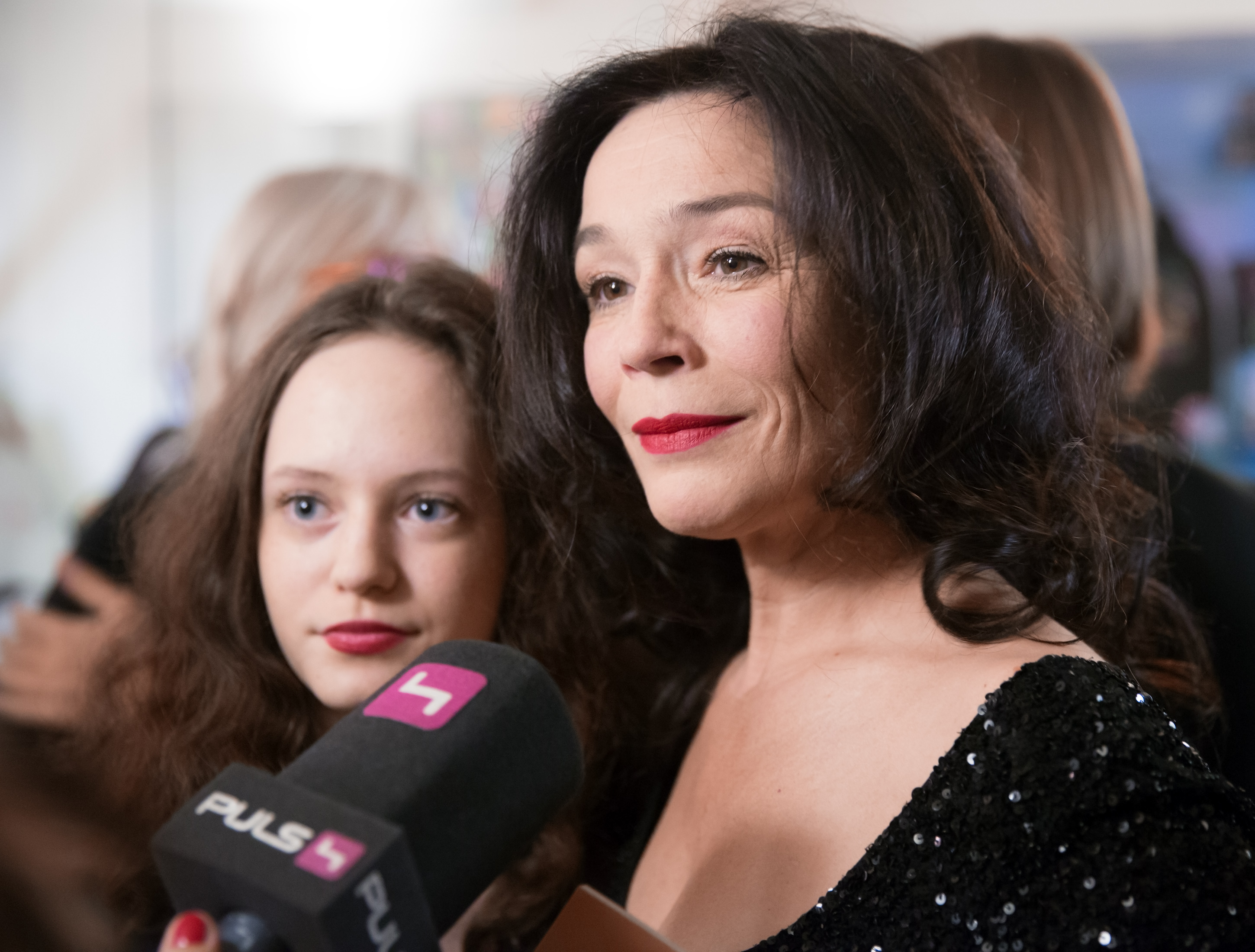
Fanny Altenburger (left) with her mother Julia Stemberger in 2015 at the award ceremony of the Nestroy Theatre Prize

Fanny Altenburger (born in 2000) is an Austrian actress.

== Life and career ==
The daughter of the actress Julia Stemberger and the violinist Christian Altenburger, she gained her first film experience in 2010 with Jud Süß - Film ohne Gewissen at the side of Tobias Moretti and Martina Gedeck, who played her parents. Since 2011 Altenburger has regularly participated in the Festspiele Reichenau and appeared there in 2011 in the silent role of the page in Der Rosenkavalier by Richard Strauss, in 2012 in the stage version of Anna Karenina as Serjoscha, in 2013 in Die Stützen der Gesellschaft by Henrik Ibsen, 2015 as Frida Foldal in John Gabriel Borkman by Henrik Ibsen and as Köhlerkind in The Alpine King and the Enemy of Man, in 2016 as Fella Storch in Die Dämonen by Heimito von Doderer and in 2017 in Schnitzler's Im Spiel der Sommerlüfte on stage.

In 2016, she appeared in the film Wir töten Stella by Julian Pölsler. In 2018, she completed school with the Matura. She appeared as Anna in Die letzte Party deines Lebens. In the television series Counterpart, she played the role of Ethel in 2018. She performed in the play Honig im Kopf by Florian Battermann based on the eponymous film by Til Schweiger.

== Filmography (selection) ==
- 2010: Jud Süß – Film ohne Gewissen
- 2010: Tom Turbo – The horse of the princess
- 2010: Schnell ermittelt – Viktor Zacharias
- 2016: SOKO Donau – Ausgeklinkt
- 2017: Schnell ermittelt – Carlo Michalek
- 2017: Wir töten Stella
- 2018: Die letzte Party deines Lebens
- 2018–2019: Counterpart (TV series)
- 2025: How to Be Normal and the Oddness of the Other World
