= Julia Stemberger =

Austrian actress (born 1965)

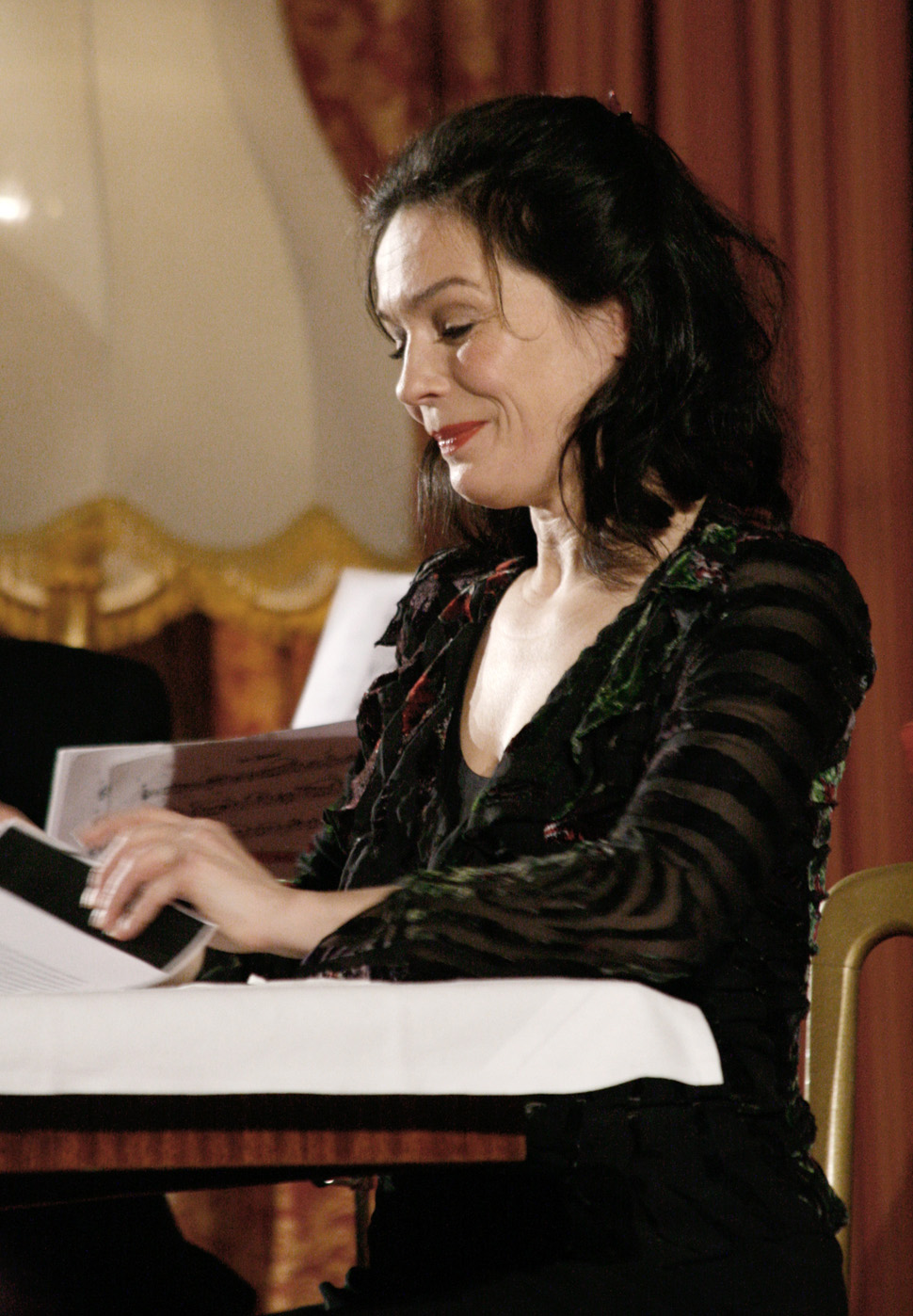
- Julia Stemberger in 2010
- Born: Julia Stemberger; 29 January 1965 (age 61); Vienna, Austria
- Occupation: Actress
- Years active: 1984-present
- Children: Fanny Altenburger
- Relatives: Katharina Stemberger (sister)

Julia Stemberger (born 29 January 1965) is an Austrian actress.

== Early life ==
Stemberger was born in Vienna, Austria to actress Christa Schwertsik and medical doctor Heinrich Stemberger. Her younger sister, Katharina Stemberger also became a renowned actress.

Besides the acting classes with Dorothea Neff and Eva Zilcher she also learned singing ballet- and jazz dancing and playing flutes and the piano.

== Career ==
=== Film and TV ===
Just after her Matura aged 19, Stemberger assumed the lead role in her first Film Herzklopfen in 1984. The film was very successful and yielded her a large public attention. She also played the role of Frau Linge in Swing Kids (1993 film). She played in several German film productions for instance Xaver Schwarzenberger and also the TV Series Die Stein and 11er Haus

=== Theater ===
In theater, Stemberger's first success was as Paula in The Abduction of the Sabine Women at the Wiener Volkstheater (1986 to 1987). The following year, she played in Stephan Bruckmeiers (born 1962 year, Wien, Austria) adaption of Wolfgang Bauer's Magic Afternoon as well as The Youth in Der Bauer als Millionär by Jürgen Flimm at the Salzburger Festspiele. She then played in several plays directed by Flimm and in Peter Zadek's adaption of The Merchant of Venice the first time at the Burgtheater of Vienna.

She also starred in George Tabori's adaption of Othello and again in Antony and Cleopatra from Peter Stein at the Salzburger Festspiele as well as in My Fair Lady at the Wiener Volksoper and other Theaters in Vienna, Hamburg and Munich.

In addition to her work as a theater and film actress Stemberger performed together with the ensembles The Austrian Salonists and the String Quartet Sonare stage programs in which they mainly humorous from the works of writers such as Alfred Polgar, Karl Kraus, Anton Kuh, Isabel Allende, Vladimir Kaminer, Umberto Eco.

== Personal life ==
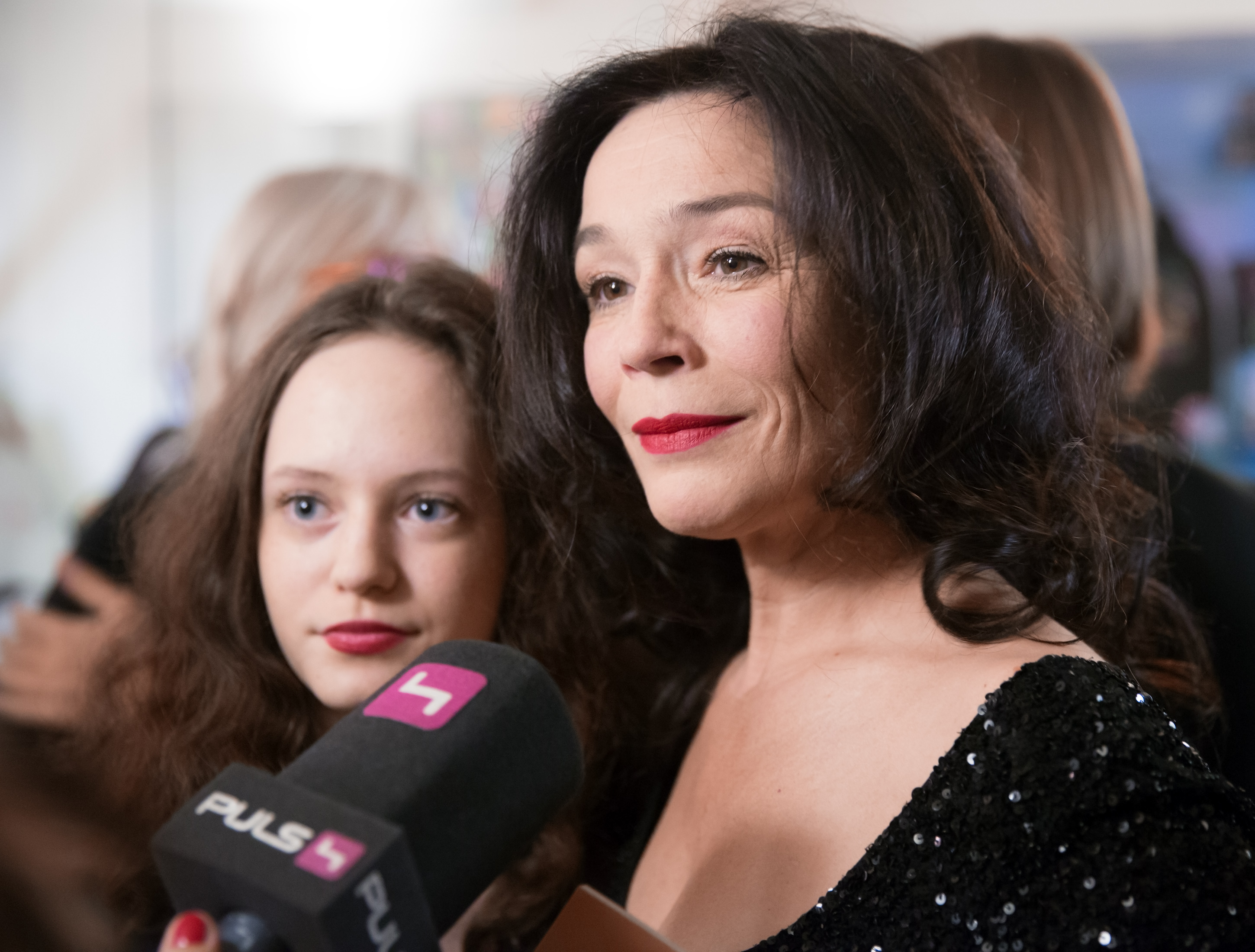
Julia Stemberger (right) with her daughter Fanny Altenburger in 2015 at the award ceremony of the Nestroy Theatre Prize

In 1997, Stemberger married violinist Christian Altenburger with whom she has a daughter, Fanny. From 1999 to 2005 they had the musical and artistic stewardship of the Mondseetage a festival for Kammermusik taking place in the Austrian Mondsee. In 2007 they were divorced.
