= Intimate Cabaret =

British TV variety series (1937–1939)

- Genre: Variety
- Created by: Harry Pringle
- Based on: Cabaret
- Country of origin: England
- Original language: English
- No. of episodes: 24

Production
- Producers: Harry Pringle, Eric Fawcett
- Running time: 10–30 minutes
- Production company: BBC Television

Original release
- Network: BBC Television
- Release: 4 November 1937 – 29 August 1939

Intimate Cabaret is a British television programme broadcast from 1937 to 1939 on BBC Television. It was one of several spin-offs from the BBC series Cabaret. It was a live variety programme. There were 24 episodes. The first seven were produced by Harry Pringle and the last two by Eric Fawcett; the producers of the others are not known. No episode has survived. (Note: The programme was broadcast live. Methods to record live television did not exist until late 1947, and were rarely used by the BBC until around 1953–55.)

== Performers ==
The following performers appeared in the series five or more times, or as of February 2016 are the subjects of Wikipedia articles. Their numbers of appearances are given in parentheses.

- BBC Television Orchestra (1)
- Evel Burns, pianist (before 1937 – after 1946) (6)
- Jane Carr (1909–57), English actress (1)
- Cyril Fletcher (1913–2005), English comedian (4)
- Steven Geray (1904–73), Hungarian-born actor (2)
- Tommy Handley (1892–1949), British comedian (1)
- Bruno Hoffmann (1913–91), German player of the glass harp (1)
- Stanley Holloway (1890–1982), English comedian (1)
- Nelson Keys (1886–1939), British actor and singer (1)
- Magda Kun (1912–45), Hungarian-born actress (2)
- Eve Lister (1913–97), British actress (1)
- Billy Mayerl (1902–59), English pianist and composer (1)
- Derek Oldham (1887–1968), English singer and actor (1)
- Irene Prador (1911–96), Austrian actress (2)
- Oliver Wakefield (1909–56), British actor and comedian (3)

== See also ==
- Cabaret (British TV series)
- Cabaret Cartoons
- Cabaret Cruise
- Comedy Cabaret
- Eastern Cabaret
- Western Cabaret
