= Cabaret (British TV programme) =

British TV variety series (1936–1939)

- Genre: Variety show
- Created by: Dallas Bower
- Country of origin: England
- Original language: English
- No. of episodes: 132

Production
- Producers: Harry Pringle and others
- Production company: BBC Television

Original release
- Network: BBC Television
- Release: 7 November 1936 – 2 November 1946

Related
- Cabaret Cartoons, Cabaret Cruise, Comedy Cabaret, Eastern Cabaret, Intimate Cabaret, Western Cabaret

Cabaret is a live television variety programme series broadcast by BBC Television 1936–1939 and 1946. (Note: BBC Television suspended operations on the outbreak of World War II on 1 September 1939, and resumed only in June 1946.) It was devised by Dallas Bower, and later developed by Harry Pringle, who also produced 68 episodes. BBC Television began regularly scheduled broadcasts on 2 November 1936; the first episode of Cabaret was shown on 7 November 1936, and this television series was therefore one of the first ever.

No episodes have survived. (Note: The show was broadcast live. Technology to record live programmes was only developed in 1947, and was rarely used by the BBC before 1953–55.)

Cabaret yielded six spin-off series, among the very earliest of that kind: Cabaret Cartoons (1936–39, 1949), Cabaret Cruise (1937–39, 1946, 1949), Comedy Cabaret (1938–39), Eastern Cabaret (1938–39), Intimate Cabaret (1937–39) and Western Cabaret (1939). In August 1939, Pringle was planning another spin-off, a Hawaiian cabaret to have been broadcast in October 1939; but that project seems to have been abandoned with the outbreak of World War II.

== Performers ==
Around 280 performing acts appeared in Cabaret over the five years in which it was broadcast. The following appeared five or more times, or as of February 2016 are the subjects of Wikipedia articles. Their numbers of appearances are given in parentheses.

- Avril Angers (1918–2005), English comedian (1)
- Arthur Askey (1900–82), English comedian (1)
- BBC Television Orchestra (11)
- Teddy Brown (1900–46), American xylophonist (1)
- Una Mae Carlisle (1915–56), American singer-pianist (1)
- Eric Cardi, conjuror (10)
- Jane Carr (1909–57), English actress (1)
- Jean Colin (1905–89), English actress (4)
- Edward Cooper, singer-pianist (7)
- Evelyn Dall (1918–2010), American (1)
- The Knife-Throwing Denvers, American knife-throwers (1)
- Richard Dolman (1895–1978), British stage and film actor (1)
- Fred Duprez (1884–1938), American comedian (1)
- Cyril Fletcher (1913–2005), English comedian (1)
- Flotsam and Jetsam, Anglo-Australian musical comedy duo (6)
- Ronald Frankau (1894–1951), English comedian (3)
- Steven Geray (1904–73), Hungarian-born film actor (5)
- Peter Godfrey (1899–1970), English actor (1)
- Walter Gore (1910–79), Scottish dancer (1)
- Hyam Greenbaum, orchestral conductor (9)
- Adelaide Hall (1901–93), American jazz singer (1)
- Charles Harrison, comedian (9)
- Ken Harvey, banjoist (5)
- Richard Haydn (1905–85), English comedian (2)
- Richard Hearne (1908–79), English comedian (2)
- Leslie Henson (1891–1957), English comedian (1)
- Charles Heslop (1883–1966), British compere/actor (6)
- Charlie Higgins (before 1930 – c. 1978), English comedian (3)
- Hildegarde (1906–2005), American singer (1)
- Valerie Hobson (1917–98), British film actress (1)
- Stanley Holloway (1890–1982), English comedian (1)
- Renée Houston (1902–80), Scottish comedy actress and revue artist (4)
- Horace Kenney, comedian (6)
- Nelson Keys (1886–1939), English actor/singer (3)
- Nosmo King (and Hubert) (1886–1952), English variety artist (3)
- Magda Kun (1912–45), Hungarian-born actress (5)
- Ann Lenner (1912–97), English singer (1)
- Queenie Leonard (1905–2002), English character actress and singer (1)
- Eve Lister (1913–97), English actress (1)
- Sara Luzita (born 1922), English dancer (1)
- Arthur Marshall (1910–89), English broadcaster (1)
- Lu Ann Meredith (1913–98), American actress and dancer (1)
- Billy Milton (1905–89), British stage, film and television actor (1)
- Lily Morris (1882–1952), English comic singer (1)
- Richard Murdoch (1907–90), English comedian (1)
- Talbot O'Farrell (1878–1952, English singer (2)
- Paddie O'Neil (1926–2010), British actress and singer (1)
- Gaston Palmer, comedy juggler (5)
- Jack Payne and His Orchestra, a dance band (1)
- Molly Picon (1898–1992), American singer/impressionist (3)
- Gillie Potter (1887–1975), English comedian (1)
- Irene Prador (1911–96), Austrian-born actress (1)
- George Robey (1869–1954), English comedian (4)
- Eric Robinson (1908–74), orchestral conductor (5)
- Carson Robison (1890–1957) and His Pioneers, American country music singer (1)
- Harry Rutherford (1903–85), British cartoonist (1)
- Scott Sanders, comedian (5)
- Mabel Scott (1915–2000), American singer (1)
- Gene Sheldon (1908–82), American banjoist-comedian (1)
- Donald Stewart (1910–66), American actor and singer (4)
- Tony Sympson (1906–83), British actor (1)
- Harry Tate (1872–1940), Scottish comedian (1)
- Wendy Toye (1917–2010), English dancer (1)
- The Six Viennese Singing Sisters, singers (3)
- Oliver Wakefield (1909–56), British comedian (3)
- Syd Walker (1886–1945), British actor and comedian (2)
- Walsh and Barker, voice and piano (13)
- Jack Warner (1895–1981), English singer-comedian (7)
- Naunton Wayne (1901–70), British actor and compere (3)
- The Western Brothers, English comedians/singers (3)
- Eric Wild (1910–89) and His Band, musicians (2)
- Robb Wilton (1881–1957), English comedian (3)
- Anne Ziegler (1910–2003), English singer (2)
- Charles Zwar (1911–89), Australian performer and music director (1)

== Producers ==
The names of the producers associated with Cabaret are followed by the years in which they were involved. The numbers of episodes in which they were involved are given in parentheses.

- Dallas Bower (1907–99), 1936–37 (4)
- Archie Campbell, 1938 (1)
- Desmond Davis, 1938 (2)
- Cecil Madden, 1936–38 (4)
- D. H. Munro, 1937–46 (7)
- George More O'Ferrall (1907–82), 1936 (2)
- Harry Pringle (1903 – after 1959), 1937–46 (68)
- Reginald Smith, 1937–39 (11)
- Stephen Thomas, 1937 (2)
- Lanham Titchener, 1939 (1)

== See also ==
- Cabaret Cartoons
- Cabaret Cruise
- Comedy Cabaret
- Intimate Cabaret
- Eastern Cabaret
- Western Cabaret
