= Cabaret Cruise =

British TV variety series (1937–1949)

- Genre: Variety
- Created by: Harry Pringle
- Based on: Cabaret
- Presented by: Commander Campbell
- Country of origin: England
- Original language: English
- No. of episodes: 15

Production
- Producer: Harry Pringle
- Running time: 30–60 minutes
- Production company: BBC Television

Original release
- Network: BBC Television
- Release: 12 April 1937 – 15 October 1949

Cabaret Cruise is a live variety programme series broadcast 1937–39, 1946 and 1949 on BBC Television. It was one of several spin-offs from the BBC series Cabaret. Its distinctive feature was that it was set on the fictional ship RMS Sunshine, constructed in the studio. All 15 episodes were presented by British naval officer and broadcaster Commander Campbell and produced by Harry Pringle.

An episode had been planned for October 1939; it was not broadcast, because BBC Television suspended operations with the outbreak of World War II on 1 September 1939. In 1940, Pringle relocated to Australia. He was in England 1946–47 between spells of employment at the Australian Broadcasting Corporation, and in 1949 on leave of absence, and produced episodes on both occasions.

No episodes have survived. (Note: The show was broadcast live. Methods for recording live television did not exist until late 1947, and were used very rarely by the BBC until around 1953–55.)

== Performers ==
Performers (number of episodes given in parentheses) included:

- Dick Bentley (1907–95), Australia-born comedian (1)
- The Beverley Sisters, vocal and light entertainment trio (2)
- Buddy Bradley (1905–72), choreographer (1)
- Commander Campbell (1881–1966), compere (15)
- Florence Desmond (1905–93), English comedian (1)
- Steven Geray (1904–73), Hungarian-born actor (4)
- Leslie Henson (1891–1957), English comedian (1)
- Charles Heslop (1883–1966), actor (1)
- Jack Jackson (1906–78), trumpeter and bandleader (1)
- Jean Kent (1921–2013), British actress (1)
- Magda Kun (1912–45), Hungarian-born actress (4)
- Eve Lister (1913–97), British actress (1)
- Joy Nichols (1925–92), Australian-born comedian (1)
- Irene Prador (1911–96), Austrian-born actress (1)
- George Robey (1869–1954), English comedian (1)
- Eric Robinson (1908–74) and His Boat Deck Boys, musicians (3)
- Ernest Shannon, impressionist (5)
- The Ship's Band, musicians (8)
- Edwin Styles (1899–1960), actor (2)
- Jack Train (1902–66), British film actor (1)

== See also ==
- Cabaret (British TV series)
- Cabaret Cartoons
- Comedy Cabaret
- Eastern Cabaret
- Intimate Cabaret
- Western Cabaret
