= Comedy Cabaret =

British TV comedy series (1938–1939)

- Genre: Variety
- Created by: Harry Pringle
- Based on: Cabaret
- Country of origin: England
- Original language: English
- No. of episodes: 5

Production
- Producers: Harry Pringle, Arthur Ozmond
- Running time: 30–45 minutes
- Production company: BBC Television

Original release
- Network: BBC Television
- Release: 18 January 1938 – 28 February 1939

Comedy Cabaret is a British television programme broadcast 1938–1939 on BBC Television. It was one of several spin-offs from the BBC series Cabaret. It was a live variety programme. There were five episodes, three in 1938 and two in 1939. (Note: Internet Movie Database (IMDb) lists seven episodes. However, according to Radio Times two of those were repeat performances: 22 January 1938 of 18 January 1938, with one change of performer, and 12 August 1938 of 10 August 1938.) The three 1938 episodes were produced by Harry Pringle, and one of the 1939 episodes by Arthur Ozmond. No episode has survived. (Note: The programme was broadcast live. Methods to record live television did not exist until late 1947, and were rarely used by the BBC until around 1953–55.)

== Performers ==
As of February 2016, the following performers who appeared in Comedy Cabaret are subjects of Wikipedia articles. Their numbers of appearances (counting 18/22 January and 10/12 August 1938 as single episodes) are given in parentheses.

- Hermione Baddeley (1906–86). English character actress (1)
- Jane Carr (1909–57), British actress (1)
- Charles Heslop (1883–1966), British actor, compere (1)
- Charlie Higgins, (before 1930 – c. 1978), English comedian (1)
- George Robey (1869–1954), English comedian (2)

== See also ==
- Cabaret (British TV series)
- Cabaret Cartoons
- Cabaret Cruise
- Eastern Cabaret
- Intimate Cabaret
- Western Cabaret
