= Adele Dixon =

British actress and singer (1908–1992)

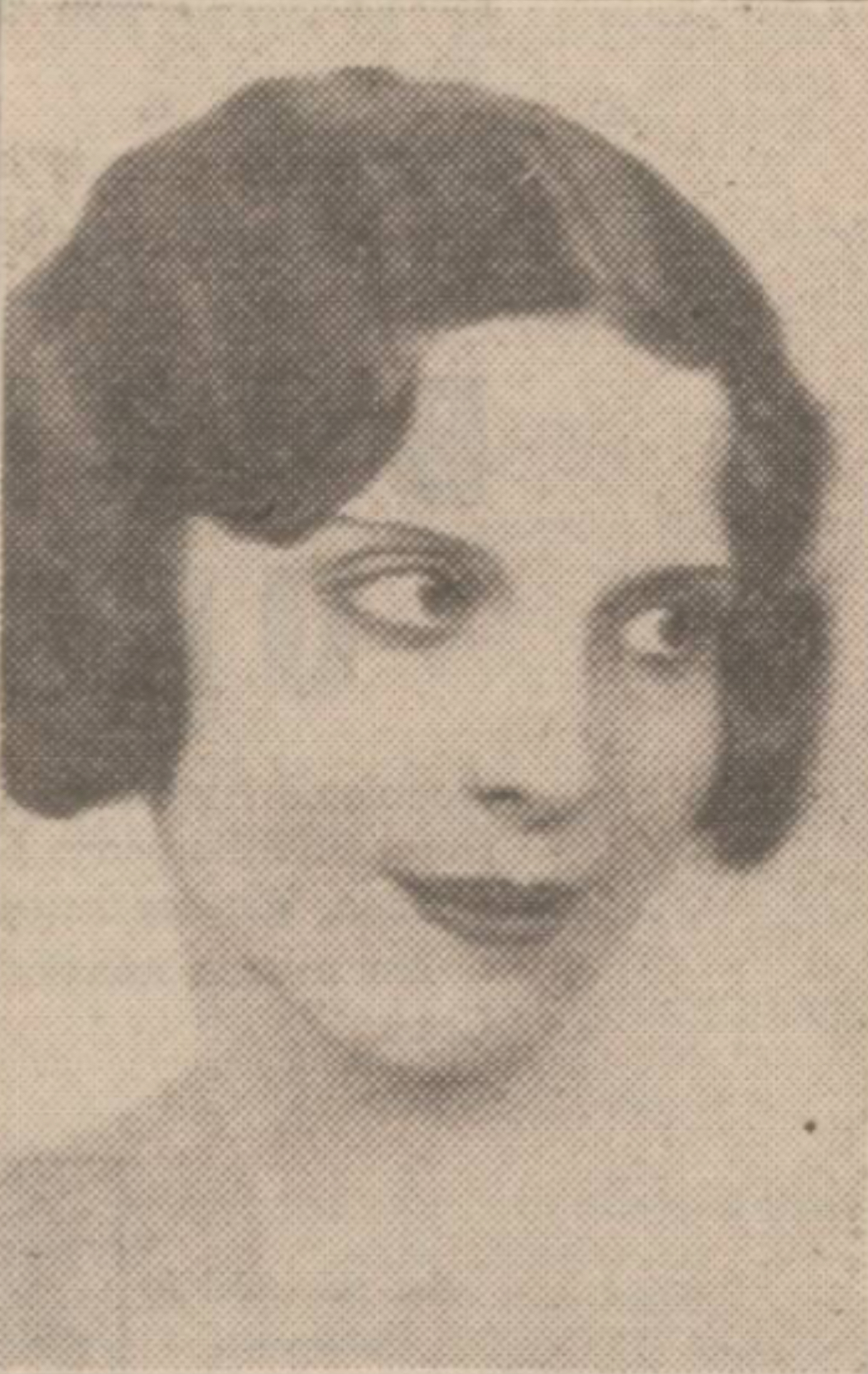
Dixon in Manchester Evening News, 1939

Adele Dixon (born Adelaide Helena Dixon; 3 June 1908 – 11 April 1992) was an English actress and singer. She sang at the start of regular broadcasts of the BBC Television Service on 2 November 1936.

After an early start as a child actress, and training at the Royal Academy of Dramatic Art, she became a member of the Old Vic, from 1928 to 1930, appearing in a wide range of roles, predominantly in Shakespeare's plays, but also those of Sheridan, Molière and Shaw. Her performance in her first singing role so impressed the composer Richard Addinsell, that he secured her the leading role in the West End adaptation of Priestley's The Good Companions in 1931.

After she left the Old Vic in 1930, Dixon played occasionally in non-musical plays, but, in general, her career was on the musical stage, starring in shows by Jerome Kern, Cole Porter, Vivian Ellis and others. Later, she became well known for her appearances in pantomime. Her last appearance, before she retired, was in the West End musical Belinda Fair in 1949.

== Life and career ==
=== Early years ===
Dixon was born in London, a Cockney, the daughter of a coach maker, Frederick Dixon, and his wife Elizabeth (née Barrett) Dixon. She studied at the Italia Conti Academy of Theatre Arts as a child, and was cast in her first professional part as the First Elf in Where the Rainbow Ends in December 1921. After further roles as a child actress, she won a scholarship to the Royal Academy of Dramatic Art, where she studied for two years under the direction of Kenneth Barnes. In her late teens, she was already playing leading adult parts, and, in 1927, she went on a tour to Egypt with Robert Atkins's company, playing Olivia in Twelfth Night, Jessica in The Merchant of Venice, Mariana in Measure for Measure and Bianca in Othello.

In August 1928, Dixon married Ernest Schwaiger, a leading jeweller, their marriage lasting until his death in 1976. They had no children. The month after her wedding, Dixon joined the Old Vic company for two seasons. Her roles were mainly Shakespearean – thirteen such, including Hecate in Macbeth (with John Laurie in the title role) in the first season, and Olivia to the Hamlet of the rising star John Gielgud in the second. She also played in works by Sheridan, Molière and Shaw, but the role that shaped the course of her later career was her first singing part, the Sleeping Beauty, in Adam's Opera by Clemence Dane with music by Richard Addinsell. The piece was not especially well received, but the composer was impressed.

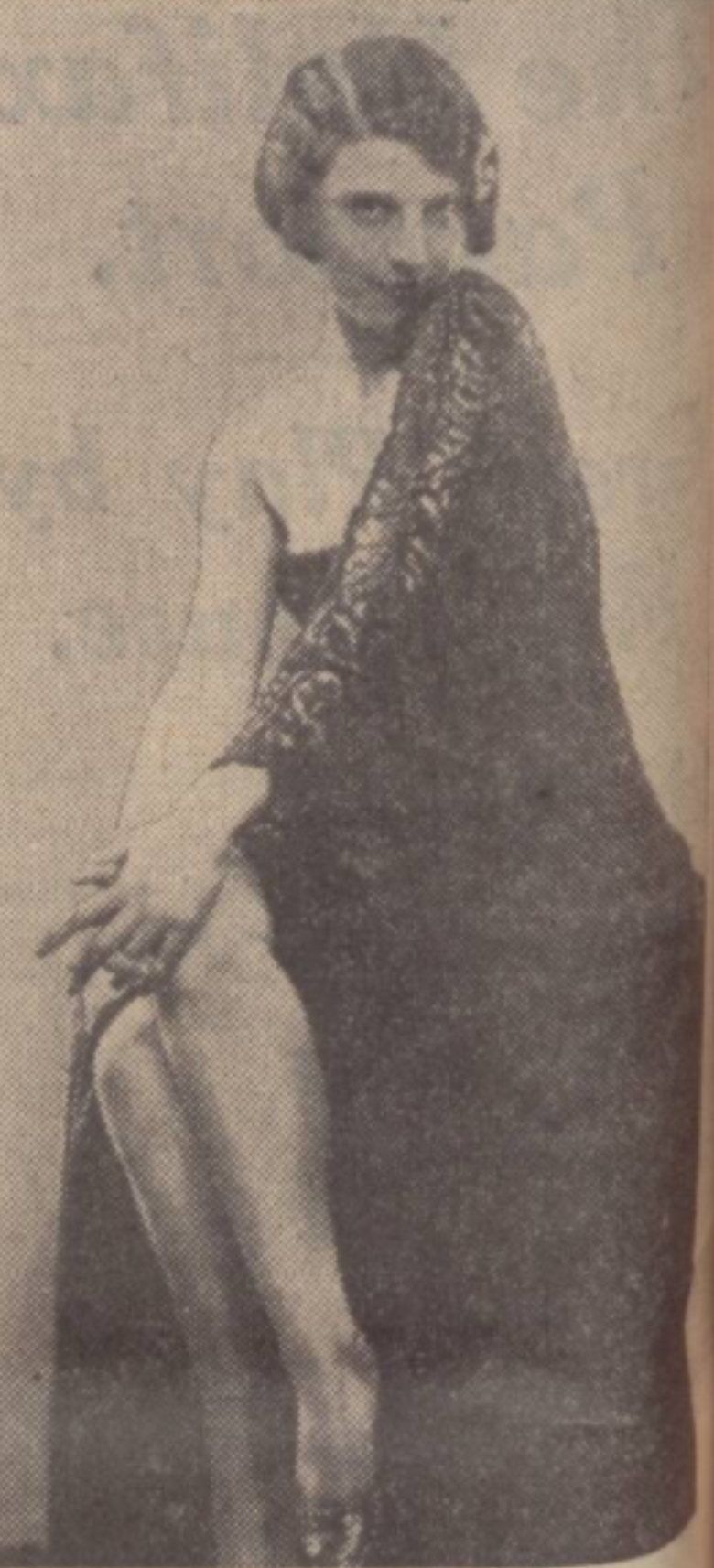
Dixon in the Leeds Mercury, 1931

After leaving the Old Vic Company in 1930, Dixon was cast at Addinsell's instigation in a West End musical role, J B Priestley's The Good Companions, adapted for the stage by the author and Edward Knoblock, with music by Addinsell. Dixon was given the starring female role, Susie, opposite Gielgud as Inigo. The piece ran for nearly a year in 1931 and 1932.

In 1931, Dixon made her first film, in the role of Consuelo Pratt in Uneasy Virtue. It was one of only two films she made in the 1930s, the other being Calling the Tune (1936), in which she played Julia Harbord.

=== 1930s – West End and Broadway ===
During the rest of the 1930s Dixon starred in the West End, and occasionally on tour, in a wide range of roles. For the most part she played in musicals, but an exception was Ian Hay's farce Orders is Orders in 1932. More characteristic were her singing roles in musical shows such as Wild Violets (1933), Give me a Ring by Guy Bolton and others (1933) and Oscar Hammerstein and Jerome Kern's Three Sisters (1934). In the last, the weak score and lyrics fatally damaged the show, despite the efforts of Stanley Holloway and other cast members; The Times observed, "Miss Adele Dixon unfailingly provides what the play chiefly lacks – swiftness, economy and glamour.

In 1935, Dixon starred as Hope Harcourt in the London production of Cole Porter's Anything Goes. The following year she was the first woman to perform on British television, singing a specially-commissioned song "Television" (or "Bringing Television to You") at the official launch of BBC television from Alexandra Palace on 2 November 1936. Although, dance band singer Helen McKay was the first singer on high-definition television in test transmissions to Radiolympia in August of that same year. Television as a medium did not greatly appeal to Dixon, and she let it be known that she much preferred the radio.

In September 1936, she was one of the stars of the Stanley Lupino-Laddie Cliff West End musical comedy, Over She Goes at the Saville Theatre. Running 246 performances, it was a hit. it finally closing on 22 May 1937. Adele Dixon played the romantic role of Pamela and, with Eric Fawcett as her lover Lord Harry Drewsden, introduced the charming Fox Trot number, "I Breathe on Windows", (music by Billy Mayerl, lyrics by Desmond Carter and Frank Eyton). In the 1938 film version of Over She Goes, the number was done by Claire Luce and John Wood.

At the start of regular broadcasts of the BBC Television Service on 2 November 1936, Dixon performed the song "Television" live on its launch programme, accompanied by the BBC Television Orchestra with conductor Hyam Greenbaum.

In 1937, Dixon made her New York debut as Claudette in the Between the Devil by Howard Dietz and Arthur Schwartz. Despite a starry cast – Dixon's co-stars were Jack Buchanan and Evelyn Laye – the piece ran for only 93 performances, from 22 December 1937 to 12 March 1938. Returning to London, Dixon starred in The Fleet's Lit Up (1938), with a book by Guy Bolton, Fred Thompson and Bert Lee and music and lyrics by Vivian Ellis. This was her last show before the Second World War.

=== 1940s and later years ===
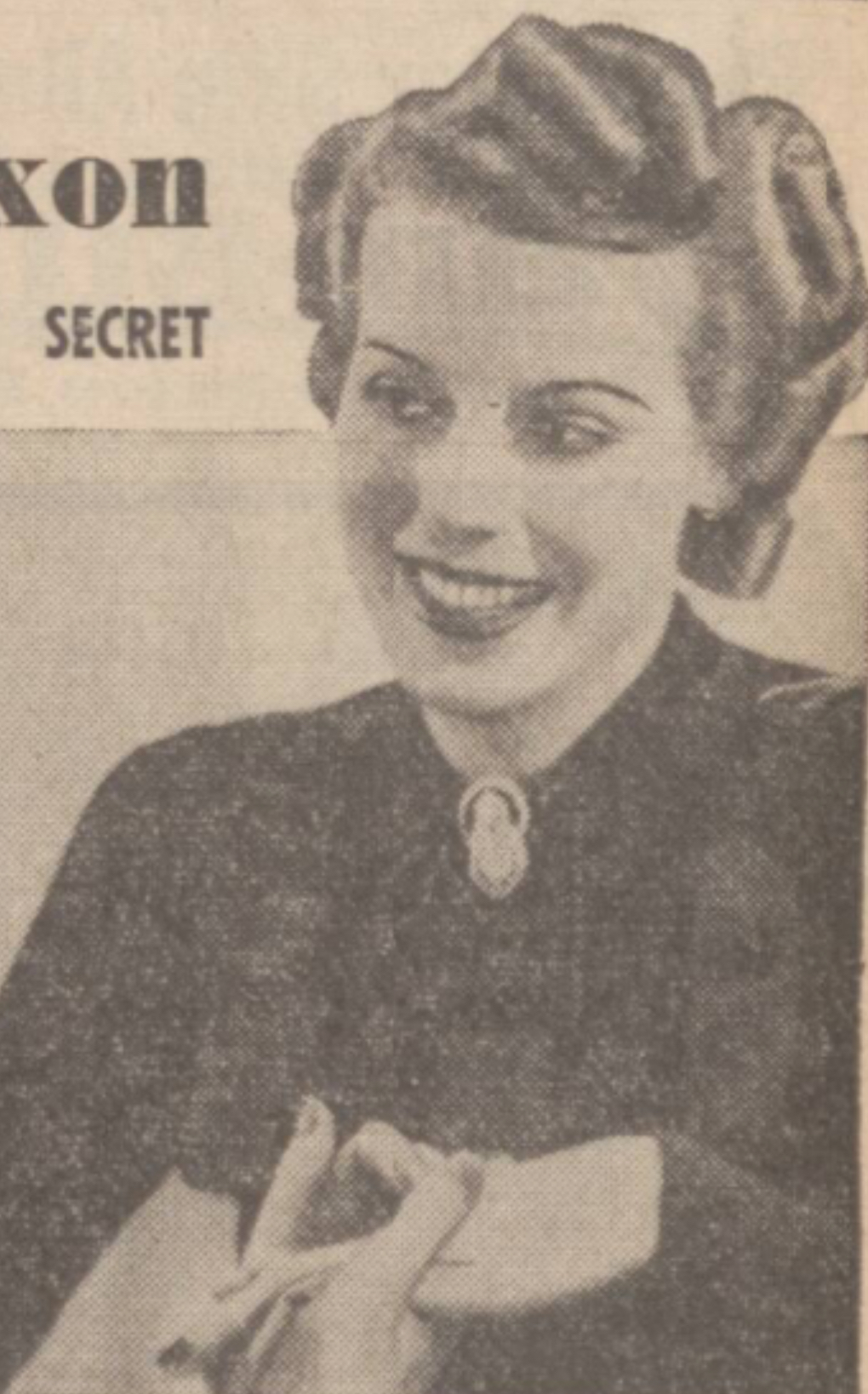
Dixon in a 1940 advertisement for Drene Shampoo

In 1941, Dixon appeared with Robertson Hare and Alfred Drayton in the film of Ben Travers' Banana Ridge; she did not return to musicals until 1944. In the intervening years, she played a range of roles. Her straight parts included Portia in The Merchant of Venice (1942), and Irene in Eric Linklater's Crisis in Heaven (1944) directed by GieIgud, but, in the main, she was a pantomime star in the war years, appearing in London and the provinces.

Dixon's last film was the 1947 drama Woman to Woman as Sylvia Anson to Douglass Montgomery's David Anson. In 1948, she appeared on Broadway again, together with Jack Buchanan. This time they played in Sacha Guitry's comedy Don't Listen Ladies!, which was no more successful than Between the Devil had been. The following year, she scored what The Times described as a major personal hit in the title role of her last West End musical, Belinda Fair by Eric Maschwitz and Jack Strachey.

Dixon retired after the run of Belinda Fair. She and her husband were a devoted couple, and his death in 1976 was a blow from which she never fully recovered. She died of pneumonia at the age of 83 in Manchester, on 11 April 1992.
