= Cabaret Cartoons =

British TV variety series (1936–1939, 1946)

- Genre: Variety
- Created by: Cecil Madden
- Based on: Cabaret
- Country of origin: England
- Original language: English
- No. of episodes: 19

Production
- Producer: Cecil Madden
- Running time: 20–30 minutes
- Production company: BBC Television

Original release
- Network: BBC Television
- Release: 7 December 1936 – 26 October 1946

Cabaret Cartoons is a live light entertainment series broadcast by BBC Television 1936–1939 and 1946. (Note: BBC Television suspended broadcasting on 1 September 1939 with the outbreak of World War II, and did not resume until June 1946.) It was a spin-off from the series Cabaret. Its distinctive feature was that English artist Harry Rutherford (1903–85) drew cartoon sketches of the performers during the broadcast. Rutherford did not speak: the producer, Cecil Madden, decreed that his Mancunian accent was inappropriate to be heard on the BBC.

No episodes have survived. (Note: The programme was broadcast live. Technology to record live television was only developed in 1947, and was rarely used by the BBC before 1953–55.)

== Performers ==
The following performers appeared in Cabaret Cartoons five or more times, or as of February 2016 are the subjects of Wikipedia articles. Numbers of appearances are given in parentheses.

- Beverley Sisters, English vocal trio (1)
- Truda Binarová, Czechoslovak actress (5)
- Petula Clark (born 1932), English singer (2)
- Edward Cooper (1883–1956), English actor (1)
- Evelyn Dall (1918–2010), American singer (2)
- Robert Harbin (1908–78), British magician and actor (1)
- Grace (1907–55) and Paul Hartman (1904–73), American dancers (1)
- Nosmo King (and Hubert) (1886–1952), English comedian (2)
- Harry Rutherford (1903–85), English artist (19)
- Eric Woodburn (1894–1981), Scottish comedian (1)

== See also ==
- Cabaret
- Cabaret Cruise
- Comedy Cabaret
- Intimate Cabaret
- Eastern Cabaret
- Western Cabaret
