= Look and Laugh =

- Genre: Variety
- Presented by: Ray McGeary
- Country of origin: Australia
- Original language: English

Production
- Running time: 60 minutes

Original release
- Network: ATN-7
- Release: 1958 – 1959

Look and Laugh is an Australian television series which aired from 1958 to 1959 on ATN-7. The series was hosted by Ray McGeary, who had his start as a performer on radio program Australia's Amateur Hour.

The series was a variety series, with emphasis on comedy. The weekly series aired in a 60-minute time-slot (running time excluding commercials is unknown), in black-and-white.

== See also ==
- The Danny Dean Show
- Shower of Stars
- On Camera
