= On Camera =

On Camera may refer to:

- On Camera (Canadian TV series), a dramatic anthology television series
- On Camera (Australian TV series), a variety series with music and comedy
- On Camera (album), a 1959 Patti Page album
- On Camera, a song by Gunna from the album Wunna
