= List of radio orchestras =

This is a list of radio orchestras with the links in their names, and the native language names in italics (where available).

== Current radio orchestras ==
=== Americas ===
Country	Orchestra	Native name	Network affiliation	Notes
Brazil	Brazil Jazz Symphony Orchestra	Brasil Jazz Sinfônica	Father Anchieta Foundation	Formerly managed by the Secretariat of Culture of Government of the State of São Paulo, since 2020 it is managed by Father Anchieta Foundation.

=== Asia ===
Country	Orchestra	Native name	Network affiliation	Notes
Japan	NHK Symphony Orchestra	NHK 交響楽団	Nippon Hōsō Kyōkai (NHK)	
Philippines	ABS-CBN Philharmonic Orchestra		ABS-CBN Corporation	
South Korea	KBS Symphony Orchestra	KBS 교향악단	Korean Broadcasting System (KBS)	

=== Europe ===
Country	Orchestra	Native name	Network affiliation	Notes
Albania	RTSH Symphony Orchestra	Orkestra Simfonike e RTSH	Radio Televizioni Shqiptar (RTSH)	
Austria	Vienna Radio Symphony Orchestra	Radio-Symphonieorchester Wien	Österreichischer Rundfunk (ORF)	
Belgium	Brussels Philharmonic		Vlaamse Radio- en Televisieomroeporganisatie (VRT)	Formerly known as Vlaams Radio Orkest
Bulgaria	Bulgarian National Radio Symphony Orchestra	Симфоничен оркестър на Българското национално радио	Bulgarian National Radio (BNR)	
Croatia	Croatian Radiotelevision Symphony Orchestra	Simfonijski orkestar Hrvatske radiotelevizije	Croatian Radiotelevision (HRT)	
Czech Republic	Prague Radio Symphony Orchestra	Symfonický orchestr Českého rozhlasu	Czech Radio (ČRo)	
Denmark	Danish National Symphony Orchestra	DR SymfoniOrkestret	Danish Broadcasting Corporation (DR)	
Denmark	Danish Chamber Orchestra	Danmarks Underholdningsorkestret	Danish Broadcasting Corporation (DR)	
Denmark	DR Big Band		Danish Broadcasting Corporation (DR)	
Finland	Finnish Radio Symphony Orchestra	Radion sinfoniaorkesteri (Finnish); Radions symfoniorkester (Swedish)	Yleisradio (Yle)	
France	Orchestre philharmonique de Radio France		Radio France	
France	Orchestre National de France		Radio France	
Germany	Bavarian Radio Symphony Orchestra	Symphonieorchester des Bayerischen Rundfunks	Bayerischer Rundfunk (BR)	
Germany	Berlin Radio Symphony Orchestra	Rundfunk-Sinfonieorchester Berlin	Deutschlandradio (DLR)	
Germany	(Deutsches Symphonie-Orchester Berlin)		Rundfunk Berlin-Brandenburg (RBB)	Formerly known as the RIAS-Symphonie-Orchester
Germany	(Deutsches Filmorchester Babelsberg)		Rundfunk Berlin-Brandenburg (RBB)	
Germany	hr-Sinfonieorchester		Hessischer Rundfunk (HR)	Formerly Radio-Sinfonie-Orchester Frankfurt
Germany	MDR Leipzig Radio Symphony Orchestra	MDR Sinfonieorchester	Mitteldeutscher Rundfunk (MDR)	
Germany	Munich Radio Orchestra	Münchner Rundfunkorchester	Bayerischer Rundfunk (BR)	
Germany	NDR Radiophilharmonie		Norddeutscher Rundfunk (NDR)	Formerly Rundfunk-Sinfonieorchester Hannover
Germany	NDR Elbphilharmonie Orchestra		Norddeutscher Rundfunk (NDR)	Formerly NDR Sinfonieorchester
Germany	Deutsche Radio Philharmonie Saarbrücken Kaiserslautern		Saarländischer Rundfunk (SR)	
Germany	SWR Symphonieorchester		Südwestrundfunk (SWR)	Created in a merger of the Southwest German Radio Symphony Orchestra and the Stuttgart Radio Symphony Orchestra.
Germany	WDR Symphony Orchestra Cologne	WDR Sinfonieorchester Köln	Westdeutscher Rundfunk (WDR)	
Germany	WDR Rundfunkorchester Köln		Westdeutscher Rundfunk (WDR)	
Hungary	Hungarian Radio Symphony Orchestra	Magyar Rádió Szimfonikus Zenekara	Magyar Rádió (MR)	Also known earlier as Budapest Symphony Orchestra
Ireland	RTÉ National Symphony Orchestra		Raidió Teilifís Éireann (RTÉ)	
Ireland	RTÉ Concert Orchestra		Raidió Teilifís Éireann (RTÉ)	
Italy	RAI National Symphony Orchestra	Orchestra Sinfonica Nazionale della RAI	RAI – Radiotelevisione italiana (RAI)	Created in a merger of the four Symphony Orchestras of RAI from Turin, Rome, Naples and Milan.
Netherlands	Radio Filharmonisch Orkest		Nederlandse Publieke Omroep (NPO)	
Norway	Norwegian Radio Orchestra	Kringkastingsorkestret	Norsk rikskringkasting (NRK)	
Poland	Polish National Radio Symphony Orchestra	Narodowa Orkiestra Symfoniczna Polskiego Radia w Katowicach	Polskie Radio (PR)	Based in Katowice
Poland	Polish Radio Symphony Orchestra	Polska Orkiestra Radiowa	Polskie Radio (PR)	Based in Warsaw
Romania	Romanian Radio Big Band	Big Band Radio Romania	Societatea Română de Radiodifuziune (ROR)	Based in Bucharest
Romania	Romanian Radio Chamber Orchestra	Orchestra de Cameră Radio	Societatea Română de Radiodifuziune (ROR)	Based in Bucharest
Romania	National Radio Orchestra of Romania	Orchestra Nationala Radio	Societatea Română de Radiodifuziune (ROR)	Based in Bucharest
Russia	Tchaikovsky Symphony Orchestra	Большой симфонический оркестр имени П. И. Чайковского	All-Russia State Television and Radio Broadcasting Company (VGTRK); Radio Orpheus (OP)	Formerly affiliated with the Soviet-run All-Union Radio.
Slovakia	Slovak Radio Symphony Orchestra	Symfonický orchester Slovenského rozhlasu	Radio and Television of Slovakia (RTVS)	
Slovenia	RTV Slovenia Symphony Orchestra	Simfonični orkester RTV Slovenija	Radiotelevizija Slovenija (RTVSLO)	
Slovenia	RTV Slovenia Big Band	Big Band RTV Slovenija	Radiotelevizija Slovenija (RTVSLO)	
Spain	RTVE Symphony Orchestra	Orquesta Sinfónica de Radio Televisión Española	Radiotelevisión Española (RTVE)	
Sweden	Swedish Radio Symphony Orchestra	Sveriges Radios Symfoniorkester	Sveriges Radio (SR)	
Switzerland	Orchestra della Svizzera Italiana		Radiotelevisione svizzera (RSI)	
Ukraine	Ukrainian Radio Symphony Orchestra	Симфонічний Оркестр Українського радіо	National Public Broadcasting Company of Ukraine (UA:PBC)	
United Kingdom	BBC Radio Big Band		British Broadcasting Corporation (BBC)	
United Kingdom	BBC Concert Orchestra		British Broadcasting Corporation (BBC)	
United Kingdom	BBC National Orchestra of Wales	Cerddorfa Genedlaethol Gymreig y BBC	British Broadcasting Corporation (BBC)	
United Kingdom	BBC Philharmonic		British Broadcasting Corporation (BBC)	
United Kingdom	BBC Scottish Symphony Orchestra		British Broadcasting Corporation (BBC)	
United Kingdom	BBC Symphony Orchestra		British Broadcasting Corporation (BBC)	
United Kingdom	Ulster Orchestra		British Broadcasting Corporation (BBC)	

== Defunct radio orchestras ==
Country	Orchestra	Network affiliation	Formed	Disbanded	Notes
Australia	SBS Radio and Television Youth Orchestra	Special Broadcasting Service (SBS)	1988	2013	
Brazil	Symphony Cultura Orchestra	Father Anchieta Foundation	1998	2005	Dissolved due to lack of funding and budget cuts.
Canada	CBC Radio Orchestra	Canadian Broadcasting Corporation (CBC)	1938	2008	Disbanded due to federal government budget cuts. Reorganized as the independent National Broadcast Orchestra.
Canada	CBC Symphony Orchestra	Canadian Broadcasting Corporation (CBC)	1952	1964	
Canada	CBC Winnipeg Orchestra	Canadian Broadcasting Corporation (CBC)	1947	1984	
Netherlands	Netherlands Radio Symphony Orchestra	Nederlandse Publieke Omroep (NPO)	1985	2005	
Netherlands	Netherlands Radio Chamber Philharmonic	Nederlandse Publieke Omroep (NPO)	2005	2013	
New Zealand	NZBC Symphony Orchestra	New Zealand Broadcasting Corporation (NZBC)	1946	1975	Originally named the National Orchestra of the New Zealand Broadcasting Service. Became independent from the broadcaster and renamed the New Zealand Symphony Orchestra.
Portugal	RDP Symphony Orchestra	Radiotelevisão Portuguesa (RTP)	1934	1989	Originally named Orquestra Sinfónica da Emissora Nacional.
United Kingdom	BBC Northern Dance Orchestra	British Broadcasting Corporation (BBC)	1956	1975	Renamed the BBC Northern Radio Orchestra.
United Kingdom	BBC Revue Orchestra	British Broadcasting Corporation (BBC)	1939	1964	Merged into the BBC Radio Orchestra.
United Kingdom	BBC Television Orchestra	British Broadcasting Corporation (BBC)	1936	1939	
United Kingdom	BBC Radio Orchestra	British Broadcasting Corporation (BBC)	1964	1991	
United Kingdom	BBC Scottish Radio Orchestra	British Broadcasting Corporation (BBC)	1940	1981	Originally named the BBC Scottish Variety Orchestra.
United States	NBC Symphony Orchestra	National Broadcasting Company (NBC)	1937	1954	Orchestra was conducted by Arturo Toscanini. Some members continued as the Symphony of the Air until 1963.

== See also ==
- List of symphony orchestras
