= First day of BBC television =

Event on 2 November 1936

The world's first scheduled, high-definition (as then defined; meaning 240-line) television programmes were broadcast on 2 November 1936 by the British Broadcasting Corporation. They had been preceded by a number of low-definition BBC test broadcasts, as well as a 180-line Deutscher Fernseh Rundfunk service, from Berlin, since March 1935.

== Background ==
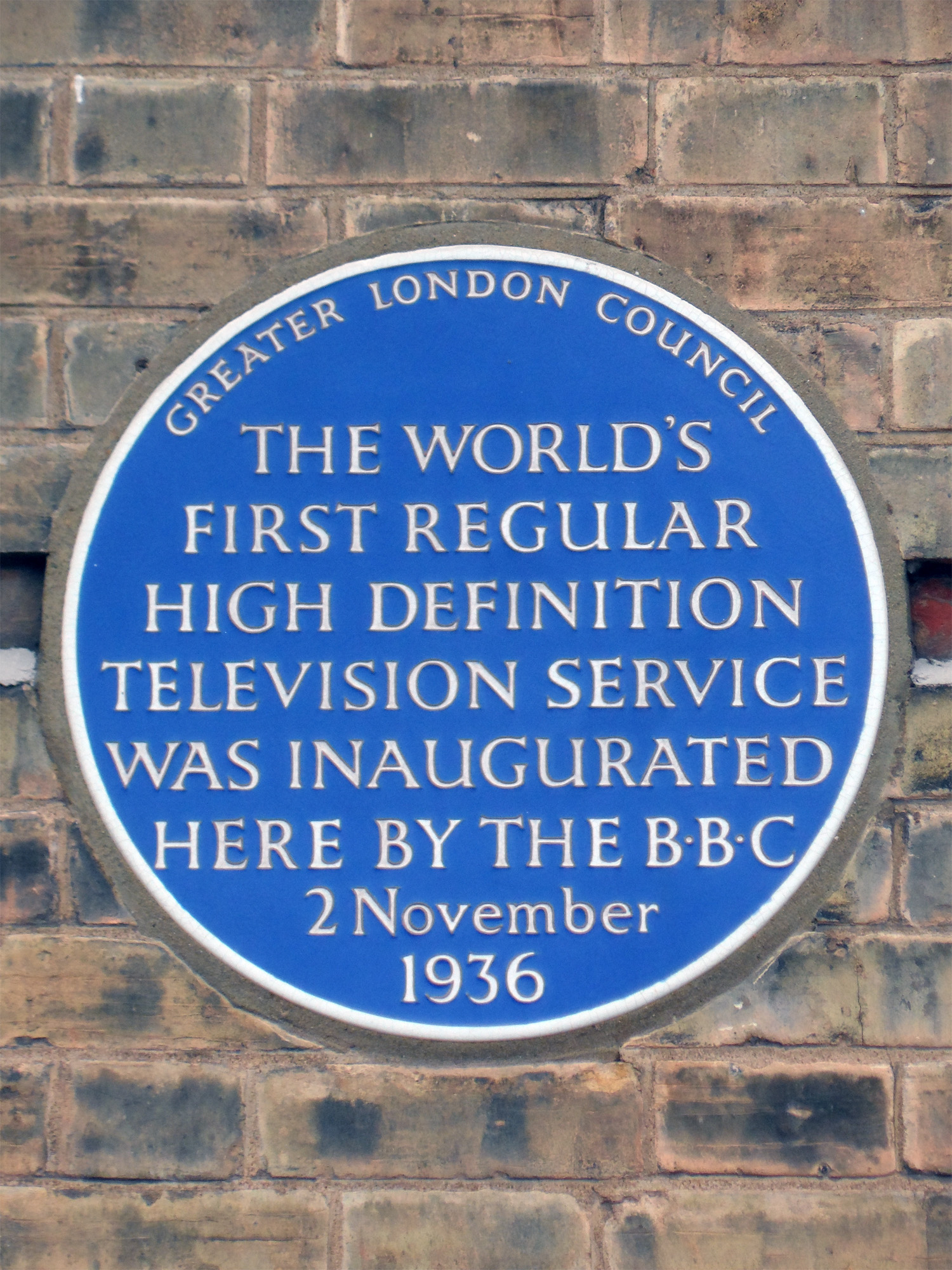
Blue plaque at Alexandra Palace

The British Broadcasting Corporation, already an established radio broadcaster since the mid-1920s, began making experimental television broadcasts in 1929. Low definition (30-line) television transmissions under government license commenced in August 1936.

The BBC Television Service officially launched on 2 November 1936. This is often described as the world's first regular high definition television service, however was the second after the German Paul Nipkow broadcast. (Note: The first regular electronic television service in Germany began in Berlin on 22 March 1935, as Deutscher Fernseh Rundfunk. Broadcasting from the Fernsehsender Paul Nipkow, it used a 180-line system, and was on air for 90 minutes, three times a week.) Programming included short ad-hoc performances by musicians, with the duration limited as "lookers in" (as viewers were called) were found to experience eye strain through looking at the small screens then in use.

== Line-up ==
The BBC's official publication, The Radio Times, listed the opening one-hour schedule – the first ever, on a dedicated TV channel – starting at 3 pm, as:

- 3:00 – Opening of the BBC Television Service
- 3:15 – Interval; time, weather
- 3:20 – British Movietone News
- 3:30 – Variety
- 4:00 – Close

The service's first afternoon period ended up closing at 4:33pm, over half an hour after initially planned. At 4 pm, Leslie Mitchell delivered a new announcement and the same order of speeches as the previous hour was repeated. This was followed at 4:16pm by the British Movietone News and Buck and Bubbles, after which Mitchell returned for a closing announcement.

From 9 pm to 10 pm, pre-recorded films and more news were screened. The films included Television Comes to London, a pre-made fifteen-minute documentary about the launch, shot on 35mm film. It was the BBC's first television documentary.

=== Opening ===
The first person heard and seen was the announcer, Leslie Mitchell.

According to advance publicity in The Radio Times, the opening was then to be:

by Major the Right Hon. G.C. Tryon, M.P., H.M. Postmaster-General

Mr. R.C. Norman (Chairman of the BBC) and the Right Hon. the Lord Selsdon, K.B.E. (Chairman of the Television Advisory Committee) will also speak.

=== Variety ===
The Radio Times billed the Variety performers as:

- Adele Dixon – Musical Comedy Star
- Buck and Bubbles – Comedians and Dancers
- The Lai Founs – Chinese Jugglers

however, in the event The Lai Founs did not appear.

Dixon performed a specially commissioned song, "Television", written by James Dyrenforth and Kenneth Leslie-Smith. The event made Buck and Bubbles (Buck Washington and John W. Bubbles) the first black people to appear on television.

The musicians were billed as The BBC Television Orchestra, led by Boris Pecker and conducted by Hyam Greenbaum. The producer was listed as Dallas Bower.

== Technology ==
The broadcast was made from a converted wing of Alexandra Palace ("Ally Pally") in London, using the 240-line Baird intermediate film system, on the VHF band. These programs would then be shown one hour later on the 405-line Marconi-EMI system

BBC television initially used both systems on alternate weeks. The decision to use the Baird system for the first week was made on a coin toss. The use of the two formats made the BBC's service the world's first regular high-definition television service; it broadcast from Monday to Saturday between 15:00 and 16:00, and 21:00 and 22:00.

Alexandra Palace housed two studios (one for each system), various scenery stores, make-up areas, dressing rooms, offices, and the transmitter itself.
