= The Danny Dean Show =

- Genre: Variety
- Presented by: Danny Dean
- Country of origin: Australia
- Original language: English

Original release
- Network: ATN-7
- Release: 1959 – 1960

The Danny Dean Show is an Australian television series which was syndicated during 1959–1960 on Sydney station ATN-7. Hosted by Canadian comedian Danny Dean, it was a variety series featuring local and overseas performers. The series aired at 10:00PM on Friday nights. It is not known if any of the episodes still exist as either kinescope recordings or early video tape.

In 1959, ATN debuted several variety series, others including On Camera and Shower of Stars, following the end of Sydney Tonight.
