= Dance band =

Dance band can refer to:

- British dance band, a genre of popular jazz and dance music that developed in British dance halls and hotel ballrooms during the 1920s and 1930s
- Big band, a genre associated with the swing era
- Dansband, a type of band playing partner dance music
- Dance Band, a 1935 British musical film

== See also ==
- Goombay Dance Band, a German-based band of the 1970s
