= Helen McKay =

British singer

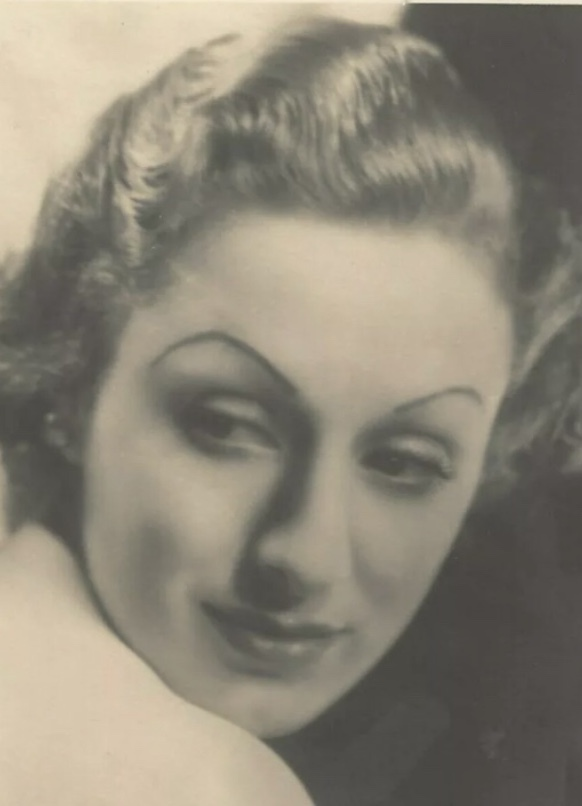
Dance band singer Helen McKay circa. 1935

Helen McKay (born Ruby Ellen Northover in Woolwich, London on 15 April 1910 - died 29 August 2008 (aged 98)) was a dance band singer, active during the 1930s and 1940s. She was the first person to sing on the then high-definition standard (405 lines) in test transmissions by the BBC for the RadiOlympia Exhibition from 26 August to 5 September 1936.

== Early life ==
Helen was born in Woolwich, London to Ellen May Edwards, a tailoress from Deptford, London and Albert William Northover, a lance corporal in the Royal Engineers from Surrey. McKay began work at Marshall & Snelgrove's department store in Oxford Street, London but left to pursue a theatrical career. After 12 dancing lessons, her ambition was to become a ballerina. She danced with a touring ballet company but then started in chorus work, notably C. B. Cochran's production, "One Damn Thing After Another."

She was noticed by band leader Lew Stone while in a publisher's office and was offered a contract as a vocalist with his band. However, Lew did not like her name and so she was given the stage name of Helen McKay. After singing in Lew Stone's band, McKay freelanced with bands led by Sydney Baynes, Oscar Rabin and Bram Martin.

== RadiOlympia TV transmission in 1936 ==
Helen McKay singing at BBC Alexandra Palace television studio during a test transmission, 27 August 1936

For the RadiOlympia transmissions, McKay sang Here's Looking At You, written especially for the test transmissions by Ronnie Hill. On the 26 August transmission, using the Baird 240 line system, she was accompanied solely by piano due to the limitations of the Baird system.

During the 27 August transmission, the EMI 405 line system was used, allowing McKay to be accompanied by the BBC Television Orchestra.

In 1986, she gave an interview to The National Museum of Photography, Film and Television, in which she spoke about her experience. For the Baird transmission, in the flying spot scanning room, she had to wear yellow face paint with purple lips and eye make-up to ensure there was enough contrast so that she could be seen. At the time, she didn't think anything would come of television.

== Later life ==
In 1939, Helen was invited to join a new dance band called the London Fire Forces Dance Band, which was directed by singer, musician and song writer Ernest W Winnette (born 1913). McKay and Winnette married in April 1940 and set up home in Maidenhead.

In the 1940s McKay was a contributor to the war effort with ENSA concerts on the BBC Forces Programme. In 1942 the London Fire Forces Dance Band had taken on a new director and so on leaving the band Ernest changed his name to Bob and set up a quartet called the Debonaires, consisting of McKay, Alex Dore, Nadia Dore and Harry Brooker. The Debonaires sang with the Ambrose Orchestra, Felix Mendelssohn's Hawaiian Serenaders, Eric Winstone and his band, and also had a late night radio show.

In the 1950s, the personnel of the Debonaires changed to Nadia Dore, Bob Brown, Helen McKay and Bob Winette. McKay and Winnette then formed The Song Pedlars quartet. Helen died in Maidenhead on 29 August 2008 (aged 98). Her husband Bob had predeceased her (died May 2000).
