= Charles Camilleri =

Maltese composer (1931–2009)

Charles Camilleri (7 September 1931 – 3 January 2009) was a Maltese composer.

== Early life ==
Camilleri was born in Ħamrun on 7 September 1931 to musical parents Carmel Camilleri and Josephine Quinton. He received initial piano tuition and grounding in the rudiments of music from his father, and also played the accordion. As a teenager, he composed many works based on folk music and legends of his native Malta. He studied under Joseph Abela Scolaro, Paul Nani and Carmelo Pace. In 1959, he studied under John Weinzweig at the University of Toronto for four years. Whilst in Toronto, he had contact with Stravinsky around the time of April 1962.

== Career ==
Camilleri moved from his early influences by Maltese folk music to a musical form "in which nothing is fixed and his compositions evolve from themselves with a sense of fluency and inevitability". He composed over 100 works for orchestra, chamber ensemble, voice and solo instruments. During the 1970s he gained international attention. Camilleri's work has since been performed throughout the world and his research of folk music and improvisation, the influences of the sounds of Africa and Asia, together with the academic study of European music, helped him create a "universal" style. Camilleri himself identified four key influences in his world music:

...the Orientally meditative, African ritualism, Jazz and European rationalism. [But] I do not directly copy [them]. Rather I take their aura, I make an abstract of such aura, and then I make an abstract out of the abstract.

According to the Historical Dictionary of Malta, Camilleri is the most internationally recognized of major Maltese composers. His works include Malta Suite, Maltese Dances, A Maltese Overture - Din l-Art Helwa, operas in Maltese, a ballet based on the Knights of Malta and the oratorio Pawlu ta' Malta. His piano piece Cantilena, is currently part of the Grade 5 Trinity Guildhall piano syllabus. The Missa Mundi for solo organ was described by its first publisher as "the organ's Rite of Spring". Noospheres (1977) was premiered at Canada House in London on 12 May 1979 by Kyla Greenbaum (Crowcroft) and subsequently recorded by her.

In 1989 Camilleri directed the Mediterranean Music conference at the University of Malta. As a folklorist he worked with Ġużè Cassar Pullicino on the book Maltese Oral Poetry and Folk Music (1998). He lived in Naxxar at the Villa L’Għana.

== Death and legacy ==
He died on 3 January 2009 at the age of 77. His funeral took place two days later at Naxxar, his long-time town of residence. Flags across Malta were flown at half-mast in tribute to him.

In 2014, the Central Bank of Malta issued a silver €10 and gold €50 coin in Camilleri's honour - and as part of the EUROPA star collector coin series which highlights European culture and events on an annual basis.

== Works ==
- Malta Suite (1946)
- Piano Concerto No. 1 "Mediterranean" (1948, revised 1978)
- Fantasia Concertante no. 5 (1957)
- Maltese Dances (1957)
- Divertimento No. 2 for clarinet and piano (1957)
- Fantasy Fugue, for strings (1960)
- Piano Concerto No. 2 "Maqam" (1969)
- African Dreams, suite for piano (1965)
- Melita, 1-act opera (1968)
- Missa Mundi, for organ (in five movements: 1. The Offering; 2. Fire over the Earth; 3. Fire in the Earth; 4. Communion; 5. Prayer), (1968)
- Paganiana, (Note: This is a set of variations on the 24th Caprice of Paganini, but its title is Paganiana rather than the expected Paganiniana) variations for piano four-hands (1968)
- Mantra (1969)
- Maltese Dances, arranged for large orchestra, (1969)
- Piano Trio (1970)
- Cosmic Visions, for 42 strings (1974)
- Missa Brevis, SATB choir of mixed voices (1975)
- Wine of Peace, for organ (1976)
- Noospheres, for piano (1977)
- L'amour de Dieu, for organ (1978)
- Morphogenesis, for organ (in five movements: 1. Le Cœur de la Matière; 2. L'énergie humaine; 3. L'atomisme de l'esprit; 4. Activation de l'énergie humaine; 5. Le monde de la Matière) (1978)
- Four African Sketches for guitar (1980), dedicated to J.H. [Kwabena] Nketia), Folk Prelude; Shadow of the Moons; Circle Dance, African Rhondo
- Three Pieces from Chemins (1980)
- Clarinet Concerto (1981)
- Concerto for organ, strings and percussion (1981)
- Organ Concerto (1983)
- Pawlu ta' Malta, oratorio (1985)
- Piano Concerto No. 3 "Leningrad" (1986)
- The Four Elements, for two mandolins, a mandola and guitar (1988)
- Cello Concerto (1989)
- Flute Concerto (1993)
- Maltese Cross, opera (performed in Paris in 2003 conducted by Christophe Vella)
- Shomyo, for oboe (2001)
- Shomyo, for clarinet (2001)
- Shomyo, for flute (2001)
- Sonata Breve, for oboe and piano (2002)
