= Cafe Continental (Australian TV series) =

- Genre: Variety
- Presented by: Hal Wayne
- Country of origin: Australia
- Original language: English

Production
- Producers: Harry Pringle (1958-60); Peter Page (1961)

Original release
- Network: ABC Television
- Release: 1958 – 1961

Cafe Continental is an Australian television variety series which aired from 1958 to 1961 on ABC. Hosted by Czech-born entertainer Hal Wayne, it featured guests of a wide variety of ethnic backgrounds and aired fortnightly, alternating with Hal Lashwood's Alabama Jubilee, a minstrel series. Producers of the series were Harry Pringle (1958–60) and Peter Page (1961). The series featured a Café setting and was broadcast live. It is not confirmed how many episodes still exist, but at least seven episodes are held by the National Film and Sound Archive, and an additional episode may be held by National Archives of Australia.

In an extant 1959 episode, the guests included Brazilian dancer Yvonne Huggman, clarinettist Reuben Solomon, Terry Carr and his dog, ventriloquist Dennis Spicer, singer Wilhelmina Bermingham, and dancers The Cossack Duo, while a 1960 episode featured Quintetto Di Toppano, dance duo Les Girls, French Apache dancers The Rivieras, a Croatian folk lore group, singer Theresa Leung Ping, and a one-man-juggling act named Chang.

== See also ==
- Café Continental – British series with similar format
- The Toppanos
