= Family Bonus =

1937 Hungarian film

- Directed by: Jenő Csepreghy
- Written by: István Mihály
- Produced by: Péter Bajusz; László Vincze
- Starring: Magda Kun; Steven Geray; Gerö Mály
- Cinematography: István Eiben
- Edited by: István György
- Music by: Paul Abraham
- Production company: Budapest Film
- Release date: 9 December 1937
- Running time: 80 minutes
- Country: Hungary
- Language: Hungarian

Family Bonus (Hungarian: Családi pótlék) is a 1937 Hungarian comedy film directed by Jenő Csepreghy and starring Magda Kun, Steven Geray and Gerő Mály. It was shot at the Hunnia Studios in Budapest.

== Cast ==
- Magda Kun as Mary, színésznõ és álfeleség
- Steven Geray as Kovács Péter
- Gerö Mály as Házmester
- Nóra Apor as Barna Nóra színésznõ
- József Barna as Vendég az estélyen
- Tivadar Bilicsi as Lonthay Tibor vezérigazgató
- Piroska Vaszary as Baloghné, házvezetõnõ és álanyós
- László Dezsõffy as Színházi fõrendezõ
- István Dózsa as Portás a színházban
- Éva Fenyvessy as Kezdõ színésznõ
- György Hajnal as a Dancing Bar portása
- Géza Márky as Táncoló fiú az estélyen
- Sándor Pethes as Arisztid
- Géza Rónai as Altiszt a bankban
- Tibor Vértes as Ajtay, elnök
- Gyula Zordon as Könyvelö a bankban
- Klári Ádám as Jozefin, a kölcsöngyerek
- Sándor Garamszeghy
- Aranka Gazdy
- Erzsi Dalmády
- Terus Kováts
- Kató Timár
- Ferike Vidor
- Jenõ Várnay
- Karola Zala

== Bibliography ==
- Juhász, István. Kincses magyar filmtár 1931-1944: az eredeti forgatókönyvből 1931 és 1944 között létrejött hazai mozgóképekről. Kráter, 2007.
- Meesmann, Karin. Pál Ábrahám: Zwischen Filmmusik und Jazzoperette. Hollitzer Wissenschaftsverlag, 2023.
- Rîpeanu, Bujor. (ed.) International Directory of Cinematographers, Set- and Costume Designers in Film: Hungary (from the beginnings to 1988). Saur, 1981.
