= Jenö Csepreghy =

Hungarian film director

Jenő Csepreghy
- Born: 29 January 1912; Budapest, Austria-Hungary
- Died: 6 May 1978 (aged 66); Maribell, Spain
- Other name: John Shepridge
- Occupations: Director, Editor

Jenő Csepreghy (1912–1978) was a Hungarian film director and editor. He gained his initial experience working in the United States before returning to Hungary in 1933 where he worked in a variety of roles, including assistant director. Promoted to director, he made six films including the nationalist Hungary's Revival in 1939. After his last Hungarian film Money Talks in 1940 he emigrated to Britain and worked in several other countries. He worked on the 1951 Orson Welles film Othello as editor under the name John Shepridge. His brother Béla Csepreghy was also a filmmaker.

== Selected filmography ==
- Family Bonus (1937)
- Bence Uz (1938)
- The Poor Rich (1938)
- Hungary's Revival (1939)
- Money Talks (1940)
- Othello (1951)

== Bibliography ==
- Cunningham, John. Hungarian Cinema: From Coffee House to Multiplex. Wallflower Press, 2004.
- Callow, Simon. Orson Welles: One Man Band. Vintage, 2016.
