= Hal Lashwood =

Australian actor (1915 – 1992)

Hal Lashwood (OAM)
- Born: Harold Francis Davies; 13 August 1915; Paddington, New South Wales, Australia
- Died: 26 March 1992 (aged 76); Darlinghurst, New South Wales, Australia
- Occupations: Vaudevillian; dancer; radio performer; television personality; theatre actor; quiz host; unionist; councillor
- Years active: 1931-1987
- Known for: Calling the Stars (radio program)
- Parent: Father - John Richard Davies (performed under stage name Joe Lashwood)

Harold Francis Lashwood OAM (13 August 1915 – 26 March 1992), professionally known as Hal Lashwood, was an Australian vaudeville performer, dancer, radio and theatre entertainer, television personality, quiz host, unionist and councillor. A well-known performer in radio, he worked opposite Roy Rene in his various "Mo" performances, usually as a straightman. He would later do the same for Syd Heylen on HSV 7's long running TV variety series Sunny Side Up in the 1950s and '60s.

== Biography ==
He was born Harold Francis Davies in Paddington in Sydney to British-born vaudeville actor John Richard Davies (who used the stage name Joe Lashwood) and Australian Christina Margaret Colreavy. He was a dancer with a theatrical company from the age of sixteen, becoming a speciality dancer and early alumnus with theatre company J. C. Williamson's, then became an actor with a travelling variety show. In 1941 he moved into theatre, appearing on stage in The Man Who Came to Dinner in 1941 and then The Patsy, The Wind and the Rain and The Squall opposite stars John McCallum and Queenie Ashton. He also worked in radio, becoming well known as Mister Lasho on Calling the Stars, Australia's most listened-to program. He married Mollie Jean Mackay, née Crothers, on 10 March 1947, and spent some time in Maitland, where he was fined by the dean of Newcastle for organising a dance on a Sunday.

Lashwood was monitored by the Australian Security Intelligence Organisation (ASIO) due to his links with left-wing groups in the 1950s. In 1951 he became president of the Actors and Announcers Equity Association of Australia, a position he held until 1976. In 1955 he contested the federal election as an independent candidate for the safe Liberal seat of Wentworth, campaigning on the issue of increased Australian content on television. In the late 1950s he compered Shower of Stars, The Quiz Kids and Beat the Brains, and hosted his own variety shows, Hal Lashwood's Alabama Jubilee and Hal Lashwood's Minstrels. In 1963 he was appointed the inaugural chairman of the Australian National Television Council.

In 1973 Lashwood was the first appointment to the board of the Australian Broadcasting Corporation by the Whitlam Labor government. When his term ended in 1976, he was not re-appointed by the Fraser government. In 1977 he won a seat on Waverley Council for the Labor Party, a seat he held until 1987. He served three years as deputy mayor. He was awarded the Medal of the Order of Australia in 1982. Lashwood died from cancer in 1992 at Darlinghurst.
