= Rooftop Rendezvous =

- Genre: Variety
- Presented by: Bill Brady
- Country of origin: Australia
- Original language: English

Production
- Producer: Harry Pringle

Original release
- Network: ABC Television
- Release: 1959

Rooftop Rendezvous is an Australian television series which aired on ABC Television during 1959. It was a half-hour variety series hosted by Bill Brady and produced by Harry Pringle. Produced in Sydney, it was regularly kinescoped for broadcast in Melbourne (it is not known if it was also shown on ABC's stations in Brisbane and Adelaide). It is not known if any of these kinescope recordings still exist.

== Format ==
It was a variety series featuring a mix of local and overseas performers. For example, one episode featured the Develleros (roller skaters), Jack Griffiths (trumpeter), Peggy Mortimer (vocalist), Warron Kermond (acrobatic dancer) and the Noel Gilmour Quintet.
