= Hal Lashwood's Alabama Jubilee =

Australian television variety series (1958-61)

- 30 Jun 1958 advertisement
- Genre: Variety
- Created by: Hal Lashwood
- Starring: Hal Lashwood
- Country of origin: Australia
- Original language: English

Production
- Producer: Harry Pringle
- Running time: 30 mins

Original release
- Network: ABC Television
- Release: 6 March 1958 – 1 January 1960

Hal Lashwood's Alabama Jubilee is an Australian television variety series hosted by Hal Lashwood which aired from 1958 to 1961 on ABC Television. It was essentially a minstrel show, with some of the performers appearing in blackface makeup. In 1960, it was retitled Hal Lashwood's Minstrels.

== Hal Lashwood's Alabama Jubilee ==
Hal Lashwood's Alabama Jubilee began in Sydney on 6 March 1958. It aired in Sydney on Thursdays and Melbourne on Fridays.

It was devised and prepared by Lashwood and produced by Harry Pringle. It aired fortnightly, alternating with Cafe Continental, a variety series featuring acts of diverse ethnic backgrounds.

It sometimes aired after episodes of Amos'n'Andy.

Notable episodes include:

- 6 March 1958 (3 May in Melbourne) – Premiere episode – with Reg Quartley as Tambo
- 5 June 1958 – live from Sydney Stadium
- 31 July 1958 – guest starring entertainer Amy Rochelle
- 4 December 1958 – guest starring Heather Pitt
- 12 March 1959 (3 June 1959 in Melbourne) – the show's one-year anniversary, with a guest appearance by Australian baritone Ron Williams who "will sing a number of negro spirituals"
- 9 April 1959 – guest starring jazz singer Bettie Fisher
- 21 May 1959 – guest starring baritone Neil Williams
- 2 July 1959 (1 January 1960 in Melbourne)

Other guests included Roy Giles, Noel Melvin, Babs MacKinnon, James Wilson and Nellie Small.

The show was replaced by Rooftop Rendezvous. Lashwood went into another variety show, Shower of Stars.

=== Cast ===
- Hal Lashwood
- Syd Heylen
- Jimmy Hanlon
- Peggy Mortimer
- Neil Williams
- Jack Kersh

== Hal Lashwood's Minstrels ==
Hal Lashwood's Minstrels
- Genre: Variety
- Created by: Hal Lashwood
- Country of origin: Australia
- Original language: English

Production
- Running time: 30 mins

Original release
- Network: ABC
- Release: 28 July 1960 – August 1961

The show came back as Hal Lashwood's Minstrels which started in July 1960 and went until August 1961. It was replaced by The Magic of Music.

Notable episodes include:

- 28 July 1960 – Premiere episode
- 12 November 1960 – guest starring Heather Pitt and Jack Allan
- 24 December 1960 – the Paul Robeson episode – Robeson starred in a segment where he gave a Christmas message to six children of different races and sang various Christmas songs.
- 7 January 1961 – guest starring Wilma Reading
- 19 January 1961 – guest starring the Three Escorts
- 27 April 1961 – guest starring Eddie Calvert
- 8 June 1961 – guest starring Dave Wheeler, Jack Allen and Helen Loraine
- 6 July 1961 – guest starring Noeleen Batley

Other guest stars included Al Kenny, Stan Penrose, Jimmy Haines, C. Ray Smith and Patti Markham.

In 1961 an album called Hal Lashwood's Minstrels was released.

=== Cast ===
- Hal Lashwood as Mr Interlocutor
- Sydney Heylen as Bones
- Reg Quartley as Tambo
- Jack Kerh as Mr Dixie
- Peggy Mortimer as Miss Carolina
- Nell Williams as Mr Melodry
- Jack Allen – and the Swanee River Boys (Django Kahn, Neville Thomas and Ron Webber)

=== Reception ===
Writing in The Bulletin in 1963 Max Harris referred to the ABC commissioning variety shows:

Even a modest weekly entry into the variety field is a dubious investment. Shows of the calibre of Cafe Continental, The Lorrne Desmond Show, and the dismal Hal Lashwood Minstrels, demonstrate the hopelessness of the A.B.C.'s half-baked amateur essays at glossy effects. Against the failure of such shows to attract viewers, the A.B.C. was shattered by the enormous national success of "The Outcasts". Public reaction itself confirmed the A.B.C.'s impulse to re-think programming at a loftier level.
