= Hungary's Revival =

1939 film

- Directed by: Jenő Csepreghy; Ferenc Kiss
- Written by: József Babay; György Ujházy
- Produced by: József Daróczy
- Starring: Anna Tőkés; Manyi Kiss; Gyula Benkő
- Cinematography: Rudolf Icsey
- Edited by: Zoltán Farkas
- Music by: Dénes Buday
- Production company: Hajdu Film
- Release date: 17 February 1939
- Running time: 81 minutes
- Country: Hungary
- Language: Hungarian

Hungary's Revival (Hungary: Magyar Feltámadás) is a 1939 Hungarian war drama film directed by Jenő Csepreghy and Ferenc Kiss and starring Anna Tőkés, Manyi Kiss and Gyula Benkő. Nationalist in tone, it celebrated the recent Hungarian territorial gains following the Munich Agreement and the First Vienna Award.

== Synopsis ==
In 1918, following the Austro Hungarian defeat in the First World War, Czech forces occupy and annexe Carpathian Ruthenia. Some families leave for Budapest while others stay under the domination of the Czech authorities, who imprison Hungarians for supporting Iriddentism. Two decades later Hungary has recovered its strength under the rule of Miklós Horthy. Two young Hungarians, who knew each other as children in 1918, return to their hometown and face discrimination from the Czechs. However, the arrival of Hungarian troops liberates their home.

== Cast ==
- Anna Tõkés as Joóbné
- Manyi Kiss as Juliska
- Melinda Ottrubay as Éva
- Ferenc Kiss as Joób Bálint
- Gyula Benkö as Dénes
- Zoltán Makláry as Jurinka
- Eta Hajdú as Reviczkyné
- Gyula Csortos as Noszlopy Géza
- Antal Forgács as Rendõrfõnök
- Lajos Gárday as Cseh katona
- Miklós Hajmássy as Cseh járõr
- Gyula Szöreghy as Cseh katona
- Károly Kovács as Cseh katona
- Lajos Köpeczi Boócz as Polgármester
- József Kürthy as Szlovák foglár
- László Misoga as Cseh foglár
- Sándor Pethes as Cigányprímás
- Imre Toronyi as Magyar pap
- Endre C. Turáni as Magyar katonatiszt
- Sándor Naszódy as Politikai fogoly
- Ferenc Galetta as Vendég az estélyen
- Anni Eisen as Vendég az estélyen
- Árpád Radó as Rádióbemondó
- Rezsõ Acsay as Templomi orgonista
- Gyuri Dévényi as Dénes gyermekkorában
- Éva Örkényi as Éva gyermekkorábanataki
- Miklós Pataki as Börtöbigazgató

== Bibliography ==
- Juhász, István. Kincses magyar filmtár 1931-1944: az eredeti forgatókönyvből 1931 és 1944 között létrejött hazai mozgóképekről. Kráter, 2007.
- Rîpeanu, Bujor. (ed.) International Directory of Cinematographers, Set- and Costume Designers in Film: Hungary (from the beginnings to 1988). Saur, 1981.
