= Kyla Greenbaum =

British pianist and composer

- Born: 5 February 1922; Brighton, England
- Died: 15 June 2017 (aged 95); Hampstead, London
- Occupations: Pianist, composer

Kyla Betty Greenbaum (5 February 1922 – 15 June 2017) was a British pianist and composer, the younger sister of conductor and composer Hyam Greenbaum. She gave the first UK performance of Arnold Schoenberg’s Piano Concerto in 1945 and the first of Prokofiev’s Second Piano Concerto in 1955.

== Education and wartime career ==
Greenbaum was born in 1922 in Brighton, England to a Jewish Russian father (born in Kalisz, Congress Poland but sent to the UK as a child to train as a tailor) and an English mother and (like her brother Hyam two decades earlier) she received her first musical training at home. She went on to study at the Royal Academy of Music (1938–42) and then in Budapest.

She first attracted notice as a pianist during the second world war as a regular performer at the famous National Gallery wartime lunchtime concerts organised by Myra Hess. The grand piano she owned for many years afterwards was scratched when the ceiling collapsed on it as she was hiding underneath during a German bombing raid.

== Soloist ==
Her evident virtuosity quickly led to performances of challenging and otherwise neglected romantic and contemporary music repertoire, such as Liszt's Piano Concerto No 2 with the BBC Symphony Orchestra conducted by Constant Lambert on 5 May 1945, and (on 30 May 1945 with Frederick Thurston and others) the first broadcast performance of Hindemith's Quartet for clarinet, violin, cello and piano.

Other contemporary works she championed were Alan Bush's Le Quatorze Juillet (on 17 February 1948), James Iliff's Piano Sonata (which is dedicated to her), John Lambert's Piano Sonata (played at Morley College on 14 March 1954) and John Greenwood's Piano Quintet. She also contributed to the revival in interest of the music of Charles-Valentin Alkan, broadcasting four recitals of his music in 1948.

On 28 August 1945, aged just 23, Greenbaum made the first of 13 appearances as a soloist at the BBC Proms with a performance of Constant Lambert's The Rio Grande. It became her calling card, with Lambert saying that he preferred her interpretation to that of Hamilton Harty who premiered the piece in 1929. (She played it at the Proms for the final time on 15 August 1951 with the composer conducting, just days before his death).

She followed this on 7 September 1945 with the first performance in England of Schoenberg's Piano Concerto, Basil Cameron conducting. Despite some underlying hostility the work was received by the audience with unexpected enthusiasm, and (according to The Musical Times) she played with "immense courage". She also performed Schoenberg's Phantasy, Op. 47.

Other Proms appearances included William Walton's Sinfonia Concertante (14 January 1947), John Ireland's Legend for piano and orchestra (10 September 1948), Alan Rawsthorne's Piano Concerto No 1 (7 September 1949), and the first UK hearing of Sergei Prokofiev's Piano Concerto No. 2 (26 August 1955), by then 40 years old. In 1952 Greenbaum was one of three pianists (the others being the identical twin piano duo Mary and Geraldine Peppin) performing Peter Racine Fricker's Concertante for three pianos, strings and percussion.

== Composition ==
Greenbaum turned to composition in later life. She wrote a score for the play with dance Theresa by Julia Pascal, one of a trilogy of plays under the general title The Holocaust Trilogy, staged at the New End Theatre in Hampstead on 5 November 1995. Bells was composed in 1998. Song of Songs, a setting of the Old Testament, is scored for solo soprano with clarinet, horn, string trio, double bass and percussion. It received its first performance in 2006 as part of Jewish Culture Day at the Southbank Centre in London.

== Personal life ==
After a short-lived marriage to the cellist Terence Weil (with whom she played as a duo in the 1940s and early 50s) Greenbaum married half-Russian psychiatrist Andrew Crowcroft in 1956. They had two children (Jonathan and Natasha). Andrew's posting to Toronto gave Kyla new opportunities in Canada including performing and recording Noospheres by Charles Camilleri and teaching Aesthetics at York University. In 1978 they returned to the UK, living in Camden for twenty years, throwing parties for exiles, writers and musicians. Kyla did occasionally still perform during this time, sometimes under her married name, both in Canada and in the UK. For instance, on 12 May 1979 she premiered (and subsequently recorded) the piano work Noospheres (1977) by the Maltese composer Charles Camilleri at Canada House.

She was co-authoring a book on the lullaby with her husband at the time of his death in 2002. It remained unpublished. Kyla died in Hampstead, London on 15 June 2017.

== Recordings ==
Her best known recordings include The Rio Grande (made in 1949) and Tchaikovsky's Piano Concerto No. 1 in B-flat minor (made in 1957). These were both reissued in 2017 on the CRQ label.
