= Tele-Variety =

- Genre: Variety
- Country of origin: Australia
- Original language: English
- No. of episodes: 4

Production
- Producer: Harry Pringle

Original release
- Network: ABN-2
- Release: 7 December 1957 – 18 January 1958

Tele-Variety is a four-part Australian television variety series which aired fortnightly on Sydney station ABN-2 on Saturdays from 7 December 1957 to 18 January 1958. It alternated in the time-slot with Look Who's Dropped In. The producer was Harry Pringle. Many ABC series of the period often had shorter seasons than those on commercial television.

The episode broadcast 21 December 1957 was hosted by Johnny Craig, and featured the Gus Merzi Quintet, harmonica player Barry Sandford, dance team The Tyroliers, balancing act The Warrens and Jandy the Musical Clown.

Two of the episodes also appear to have been shown on ABV-2 in Melbourne via telerecordings (also known as kinescope recordings). It is not known if either of these two episodes still exist.
