= Wilbur Hall =

American jazz musician

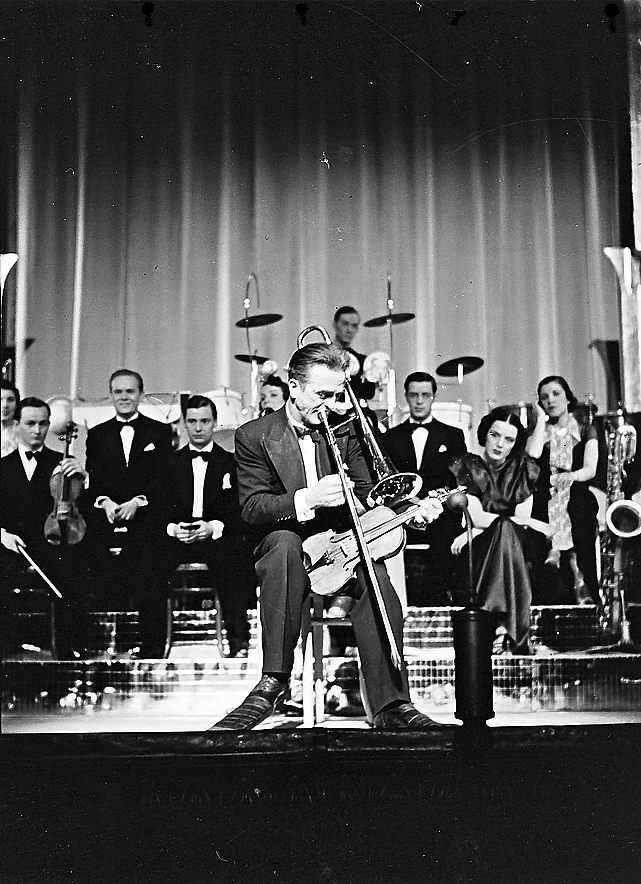
- Wilbur Hall performing on trombone and violin simultaneously during a guest performance with the orchestra of Jack Hylton in 1937.

Background information
- Also known as: Willie Hall
- Born: Wilbur Francis Hall; November 18, 1894; Shawnee Mound, Missouri, U.S.
- Died: June 30, 1983 (aged 88) Newbury Park, California, U.S.
- Genres: Jazz, vaudeville, comedy music
- Instruments: Trombone, violin, bicycle pump

Wilbur Francis Hall, sometimes billed as Willie Hall (November 18, 1894 – June 30, 1983), was an American trombonist, violinist, and entertainer.

== Early life ==
Hall was born in Shawnee Mound, Missouri.

== Career ==
Hall was working in vaudeville when, in 1924, he was hired by Paul Whiteman. Hall stayed with Whiteman's orchestra until 1930, mainly featured as a trombone player (his speciality on this instrument was a lightning-fast rendition of Felix Arndt's Nola, which he also recorded in 1929). However, Hall was adept at playing several other instruments, conventional as well as unconventional. Amongst the latter was his ability to play melodies on a bicycle pump. Whiteman's main arranger Ferde Grofé even wrote a special feature number for Hall on this "instrument" called Free Air: Based on Noises from a Garage. Hall can also be seen playing his pump and novelty violin in the early color film The King of Jazz. This routine, called "Pop Goes the Weasel", partly resembles the earlier work by vaudevillian Little Tich.

After leaving Whiteman, Hall toured as a solo act with the Publix circuit and then joined the Ken Murray Blackouts in Los Angeles. Later, he toured nationally and internationally with his wife, mixing music with comedy. He also appeared on television, for example to reprise his violin bit from The King of Jazz on the Ken Murray and Spike Jones shows in the 1950s and on The Gong Show in the 1970s.

An act called "Wilbur Hall and Renée Fields" appeared in the variety program Eastern Cabaret on BBC Television December 12 and 17, 1938. The same month, an advertisement by Fred Collins' Agency in British newspaper The Era, known for its theatrical content, announced a forthcoming appearance in Dundee, Scotland by the same act.

== Personal life ==
Hall's wife was Irene Hall, born in London in 1904, and who took the stage name 'Renée'.

Hall died in Newbury Park, California.

== Sources ==
- Don Rayno: Paul Whiteman - Pioneer in American Music, Volume 1 (Lanham, Maryland and Oxford 2003)
- DVD. "The Best of Spike Jones" (1955, 3-disk, Infinity Entertainment, 2009, previously released on VHS videotape.)
