= A. B. Campbell =

British naval officer and radio broadcaster

Archibald Bruce Campbell
- Born: 21 January 1881; Peckham, London
- Died: 11 April 1966 (aged 85)
- Military career
- Allegiance: United Kingdom
- Branch: Royal Navy
- Rank: Paymaster-Commander
- Wartime service: World War I
- Other work: BBC Broadcaster

Commander Archibald Bruce Campbell (21 January 1881 – 11 April 1966) was a British naval officer and radio broadcaster, born in Peckham, London.

== Biography ==
During the First World War he served as paymaster-commander on HMS Otranto, an armed merchant-cruiser in the South Atlantic. He survived its sinking off the island of Islay in October 1918 after it collided with a troopship in fog with the loss of several hundred people.

He first began broadcasting for the BBC in 1935 with much success. He presented the BBC Television light entertainment programme Cabaret Cruise 1937–49. He was well known for appearing on the informational radio programme The Brains Trust from its inception in 1941. He made over 200 appearances on the programme until 1946 when he was allegedly dropped for suggesting that scientists instead of animals should be used as test subjects for the Bikini Atoll atomic bomb tests. "Campbell was enormously popular with the public, which liked his direct and common-sense approach and regarded him as a personal friend". During the Second World War he also gave many talks to servicemen about the work of the merchant navy. On Thursday 12 Feb 1942 he was featured on the BBC Radio programme Desert Island Discs. After the war he became a schoolteacher and magazine publisher (A. B. Campbell & Co.) but continued to broadcast for the BBC and Independent Television. He also wrote several books of biography, children's fiction and naval history, including When I Was in Patagonia (1953), and a play based on the Mary Celeste mystery.

== Quotation ==
"It [i.e., The Brains Trust] owed its popularity to the dramatic contrast of the three principal performers. Cyril Joad [ C.E.M. Joad ] (always known as Professor Joad though he never occupied a chair) was a quick-witted, bumptious disciple of Bertrand Russell, who treated The Brains Trust as a competitive sport and a chance for showing off. Julian Huxley took the whole thing seriously, and was irritated to the point of peevishness by foolish answers, especially if they were propounded by the third member of the group, known as Commander Campbell. Julian could not see that some kind of Sancho Panza was a necessary contrast to himself and Joad. Campbell was a genial imposter, who had in fact been to sea and was said to have been a purser. He had been co-opted at the last minute because the man the BBC had invited couldn't be found, and it was said that Campbell was a man who could talk about anything. It turned out to be a stroke of genius. When we were asked to define the word 'allergy', he got in before Huxley and said "I suffer from an allergy. If I eat marmalade my head steams." Huxley and Joad were furious, but next week Commander Campbell said "I've had 200 letters from people whose heads steam when they eat marmalade". (Kenneth Clark, The Other Half: a self-portrait, London, 1977, pp. 47–48.)
