= National Ballet Orchestra of Canada =

Canadian orchestra

National Broadcast Orchestra of Canada
- Short name: NBO
- Former name: National Broadcast Orchestra
- Founded: January 2009; 16 years ago
- Location: Toronto, Ontario (previously Vancouver, British Columbia)

The National Broadcast Orchestra was founded as a Canadian radio orchestra in Vancouver, British Columbia after the CBC Radio Orchestra was disbanded in November 2008. The National Broadcast Orchestra (NBO) was founded by conductor Alain Trudel and businessman Philippe Labelle. It was incorporated in January 2009 and was granted charitable status under the Canada Revenue Agency in July 2009.

In its new form, the NBO sought to reach beyond the boundaries of traditional radio broadcasting, utilizing the Internet as its primary tool for connecting with audiences. The NBO is dedicated to presenting the work of Canadian composers and artists. Activities began in the fall of 2009 with a pilot project in digital video recording at the Chan Centre. The orchestra's first concert was performed on Salt Spring Island, British Columbia, on September 16, 2009, and its official debut in its home venue, Vancouver's Chan Centre for the Performing Arts, took place on January 8, 2010.
