= CBC Radio Orchestra =

Canadian orchestra

- Orchestra
- Short name: CBCRO
- Former name: CBC Vancouver Chamber Orchestra (1938)
- Founded: 1938; 88 years ago
- Disbanded: November 16, 2008; 17 years ago
- Location: Vancouver, British Columbia

The CBC Radio Orchestra was a Canadian orchestra based in Vancouver, British Columbia, that was operated by the Canadian Broadcasting Corporation. Until the early 1980s the CBC had a number of orchestras located in Winnipeg, Toronto, Montreal, and Halifax but due to federal government budget cuts they were eliminated and the CBC Vancouver Orchestra was promoted to national status. It changed names in 2000 to reflect its status as the CBC's only broadcast orchestra; the last radio orchestra in North America.

== History ==
The orchestra was founded in 1938 under the name the CBC Vancouver Chamber Orchestra. A predecessor of the CBC, the Canadian National Railway Radio network also had a radio orchestra. The Canadian National Railway Radio Orchestra was conducted by Henri Miro in 1931–32.

Over the years guest conductors have included Franz Breuggen, Sir Neville Marinner, Alan Hovhaness, Boyd Neel, Raffi Armenian, Kees Bakels, Michel Corboz, Victor Feldbrill, Kazuyoshi Akiyama, Serge Garant, Monica Huggett, Milton Katims, Gary Kulesha, Sir Ernest MacMillan, Ettore Mazzoleni, Geoffrey Moull, Harry Newstone, George Cleve, Brian Law, Sir Peter Maxwell Davies, Yannick Nézet-Séguin, Jaap Schroeder, Georg Tintner, Owen Underhill, Heinz Unger, Simon Streatfeild, Brian Law, Odaline de la Martinez, Rosemary Thomson, Bruce Pullen, Glen Mossop, Elmer Iseler, John Nelson, Janos Sandor, Bruce Dunn, Bernard Labadie, Grzegorz Nowak, Helmut Rilling, Keri-Lynn Wilson, Pinchas Zukerman, Louis Lortie, Susan Haig, Jacques Lacombe, Earl Stafford, Daniel Swift, Timothy Vernon, Andrew Parrott, and Jon Washburn. Most of Canada's leading concert artists have appeared as soloists.

The orchestra had 45 members at the time its dissolution was announced. It has had only four conductors in its existence. The first was John Avison who led the orchestra until 1980. For 2 years the baton was held by John Eliot Gardiner. Between 1984 and 2006 the lead conductor was Mario Bernardi. On April 30, 2006, Canadian trombonist Alain Trudel was named musical director of the orchestra, replacing Mario Bernardi as of fall 2006.

The orchestra generally performed two (fall and winter/spring) or three concert series each season. It has performed in Festival Vancouver for a number of years. Past tours have included an Arctic Tour in 1973, Coastal B.C. tour in the early 1970s, Markham and Toronto, Ontario in the late 1990s, a trip to Yellowknife in December 2004 and to Iqaluit, Baffin Island in September 2008. The orchestra performed most of its concerts at the Chan Shun Concert Hall at the University of British Columbia. Although from time to time it also performed at the Orpheum Theatre in Vancouver. For 70 years the orchestra's main services were as a studio broadcast and vinyl l.p. and c.d. recording orchestra responsible for an active program of commissioning, performing and recording new Canadian compositions. In 2004 an album of its recordings won a Juno Award for Large Ensemble Classical Recording. This successful business plan was later altered and they were restricted to performing in public broadcast concerts only at the Chan Shun Concert Hall and continued broadcast recordings from Studio One in Vancouver.

The CBC also formed the CBC Symphony Orchestra in Toronto in 1952, relying heavily on members of the Toronto Symphony. The ensemble had weekly broadcasts until it was disbanded in 1964.

== Demise ==
The orchestra was disbanded on November 16, 2008, with its final concert on that date ending its 70-year existence.

The orchestra's disbanding was unpopular in the classical music community, and there was significant coverage in the media including a long front-page article in the Vancouver Sun, a prominent article in Vancouver's Georgia Straight and coverage in The New York Times. There were also protests outside CBC locations across Canada. Several Members of Parliament from different parties expressed their opposition to the orchestra's demise at a meeting of the House Standing Committee on Canadian Heritage on May 2, 2008; Bill Siksay (NDP - Burnaby—Douglas), Denis Coderre (Liberal Canadian Heritage Critic), Joyce Murray (Liberal - Point Grey) and Ed Fast (Conservative - Abbotsford).

== National Broadcast Orchestra ==
On November 1, 2008, CBCRO musical director Alain Trudel announced that the orchestra would attempt to continue independently of the CBC, as the National Broadcast Orchestra of Canada with plans to perform six to 10 concerts a year with a contingent of between 35 and 50 players. The NBO would have a projected budget of $1 million to be provided through fundraising though the ensemble hopes to eventually qualify for government grants. Trudel says the orchestra will continue to concentrate on North American music and new works by Canadian composers and intends to be a multimedia orchestra utilizing webcasting as well as undertaking radio and television projects. This attempt failed as nothing further was heard from the NBO and Trudel. In 2010 the orchestra, based in Vancouver, prepared for its first concert; the program included The Sparrow’s Ledger, a CBC-commissioned composition by Michael Oesterle.
