= Radio orchestra =

Orchestra employed by broadcasting networks

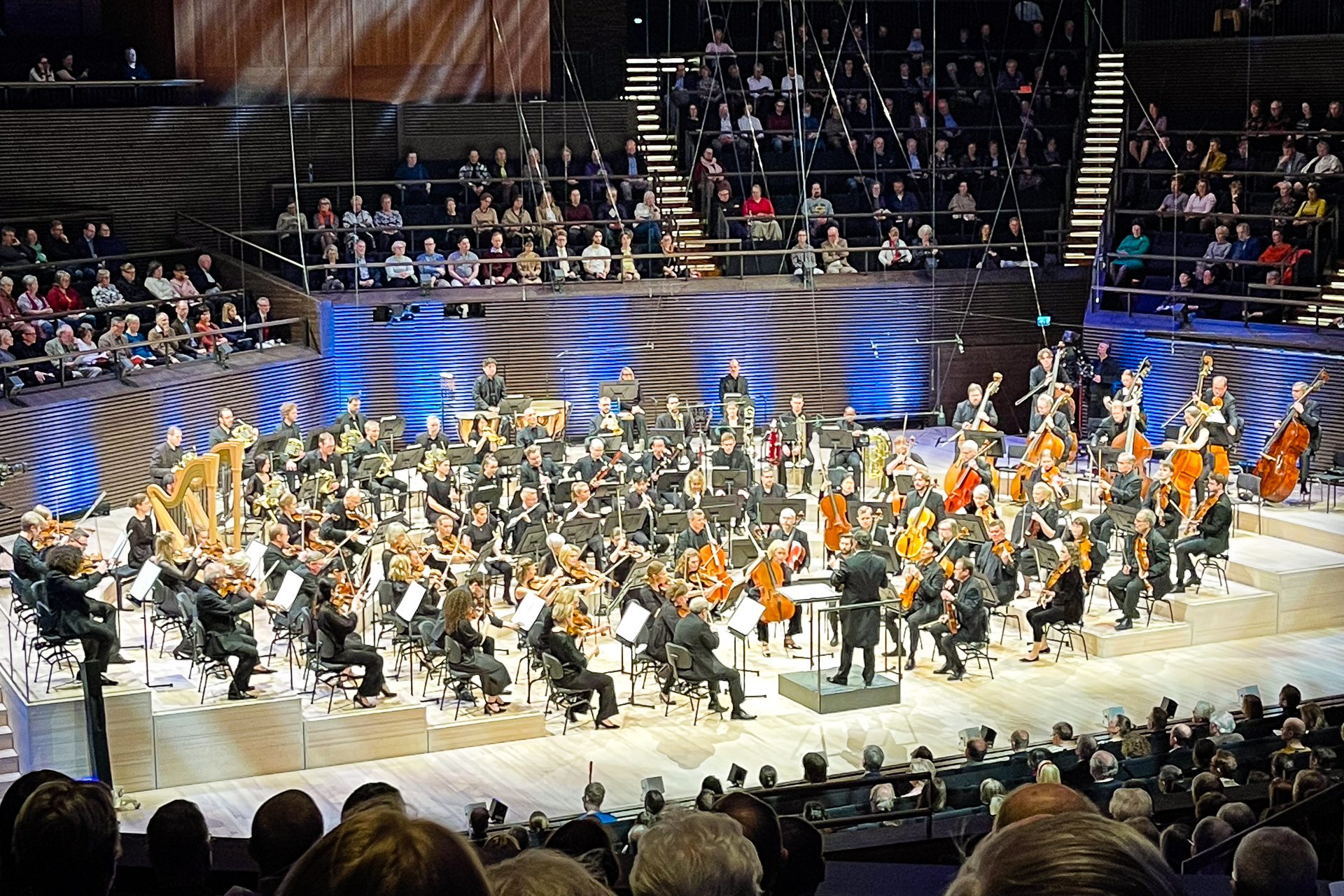
The Finnish Radio Symphony Orchestra at the Helsinki Music Centre in 2023

A radio orchestra (or broadcast orchestra) is an orchestra employed by a radio network (and sometimes television networks) in order to provide programming as well as sometimes perform incidental or theme music for various shows on the network. In the heyday of radio such orchestras were numerous, performing classical, popular, light music and jazz. However, in recent decades, broadcast orchestras have become increasingly rare. Those that still exist perform mainly classical and contemporary orchestral music, though broadcast light music orchestras, jazz orchestras and big bands are still employed by some radio stations in Europe.

Famous broadcast orchestras include the NBC Symphony Orchestra (1937–1954) conducted by Arturo Toscanini, the five orchestras maintained by the British Broadcasting Corporation, particularly the BBC Symphony Orchestra founded in 1930, the MDR Symphony Orchestra founded in 1923, the Bavarian Radio Symphony Orchestra founded in 1949, the Tokyo-based NHK Symphony Orchestra, the Danish National Symphony Orchestra founded in 1925, the Vienna Radio Symphony Orchestra founded in 1969, the Tchaikovsky Symphony Orchestra of Moscow Radio (formerly the USSR State Radio and Television Symphony Orchestra among other names) founded in 1930 and the Orchestre philharmonique de Radio France founded in 1937.

== Around the world ==
=== Europe ===
ARD in Germany has an especially large number of radio orchestras. Eleven radio orchestras perform and produce classical as well as contemporary music and jazz for the North German Broadcasting (NDR) with two orchestras in Hamburg and Hanover as well as the NDR Big Band. West German Broadcasting (WDR) has two orchestras in Cologne and a Big Band, Southwest German Broadcasting (SWR) with one orchestra (2016 merged) and the SWR Big Band in Stuttgart and Baden-Baden/Freiburg, Bavarian Broadcasting (BR) with two orchestras in Munich, Central German Broadcasting (MDR) with one orchestra in Leipzig, Saarland Broadcasting (SR) with one orchestra (2006 merged) in Saarbrücken/Kaiserslautern, Hessian Broadcasting (HR) with one orchestra and a Big Band in Frankfurt and the Berlin Radio Symphony Orchestra, Berlin.

The British Broadcasting Corporation (BBC) operates five full-time permanent symphony orchestras (BBC Concert Orchestra, BBC Philharmonic, BBC Symphony Orchestra and the BBC Symphony Chorus, BBC Scottish Symphony Orchestra, and BBC National Orchestra of Wales), as well as a full-time chamber choir (BBC Singers), and the BBC Big Band.

The Danish Broadcasting Corporation (DR) also maintains orchestra in the form of the Danish National Symphony Orchestra, the Danish Radio Big Band, Chamber Orchestra, and Radio Choir.

The Norwegian Broadcasting Corporation (NRK) runs the Norwegian Radio Orchestra (Norwegian, Kringkastingsorkestret, abbreviated as KORK). The orchestra specializes in classical music as well as popular music. This makes it quite unique in that the musicians are trained both classically and rhythmically to a high degree. The Bergen Philharmonic Orchestra and Stavanger Symphony Orchestra also have agreements with NRK to make a number of broadcast recordings a year.

In the Netherlands, the Muziekcentrum van de Omroep (Broadcasting Music Centre), an umbrella organization of the Netherlands Public Broadcasting (NPO) associations, supports the Radio Filharmonisch Orkest, the Radio Kamer Filharmonie, the Groot Omroepkoor (Netherlands Radio Choir), and the Metropole Orkest, the world's largest professional pop and jazz orchestra.

Radiotelevisión Española (RTVE) in Spain maintains the RTVE Symphony Orchestra and its professional Choir.

=== Americas ===
The last surviving broadcast orchestra in North America was the CBC Radio Orchestra founded in 1938. On 28 March 2008 the Canadian Broadcasting Corporation (CBC) announced that the orchestra would be dissolved at the end of November. The ensemble has continued independent of network affiliation as the National Broadcast Orchestra based in Vancouver.

The house band for the Late Show with David Letterman whimsically called itself the CBS Orchestra though it was not a classical musical orchestra and did not perform on CBS outside of the Late Show. The last permanent studio orchestra in the United States was The Tonight Show Band, also known as the NBC Orchestra, a big band led by trumpeter Doc Severinsen.

=== Oceania ===
The Australian Broadcasting Corporation (ABC) in Australia operates six state radio symphony orchestras through its subdivision Symphony Australia.

== See also ==
- List of radio orchestras
