= Harry Pringle (producer) =

Australian radio/television producer (1903–1985)

- Harry Pringle in 1954, on board Stratheden
- Born: Harry Noel Pringle; 25 December 1903; Australia
- Died: 30 March 1985 (aged 81); Australia
- Occupation(s): Radio and television producer (light entertainment)
- Years active: 1937–1959
- Known for: Head of Light Entertainment at the ABC

Harry Noel Pringle (25 December 1903 – 30 March 1985) was an Australian radio and television producer who worked on light entertainment programmes in England and Australia.

== Biography ==
Harry Pringle was the son of Edith Ogilvie Benzley, and Harry Lempriere Pringle (1869, Hobart, Tasmania – 1914, London, England). His father was an operatic bass who sang at Covent Garden, London and the Metropolitan Opera, New York. Pringle worked in music hall, until in 1937 he became one of the first producers on BBC Television. (Note: BBC Television began regular scheduled broadcasts on 2 November 1936. Pringle's first credit as producer is on 6 February 1937.) Between February 1937 and August 1939, he was credited 112 times as TV producer (nearly six programmes a month), three times as director, and once as editor; he was at the same time producing radio programmes.

On 1 September 1939, BBC Television broadcasting was suspended because of the outbreak of World War II, and only resumed in June 1946. In 1940, Pringle relocated to Australia, where he was appointed to take charge of radio light entertainment for the Australian Broadcasting Corporation (ABC). He created Out of the Bag (first broadcast, 31 August 1940), a radio series described by the editor of Wireless Weekly as "the best variety show yet heard here". In June 1941, he moved to 3DB, a commercial radio station in Melbourne. In 1944, he returned to ABC as federal director of light entertainment. In 1946, he resigned to return to the BBC. In 1947, he was reappointed by ABC to his former position. In 1949, he spent six months on leave in England; while there, he produced several more programmes for the BBC. He resigned from the ABC in 1954.

In 1957–59, he produced several programmes for ABC television on a contract basis.

== Selected productions ==
The listings include the network for which the programme was made; the years in which Pringle was involved; and (where known) the number of episodes (in parentheses).

- Cabaret, BBC 1937–39, 1946 (68)
- Cabaret Cruise, BBC 1937–39, 1946, 1949 (15)
- Cafe Continental, ABC 1958–60
- Comedy Cabaret, BBC 1938 (5)
- Intimate Cabaret, BBC 1937–38 (7)
- Out of the Bag, ABC (radio) 1940–41
- Rooftop Rendezvous, ABC 1959
- Tele-Variety, ABC 1957–58 (3)
- Variety, BBC 1937–39, 1946, 1949 (32)
- Western Cabaret, BBC 1939 (5)
