= Big Bill Campbell =

Canadian entertainer and broadcaster (1891–1952)

- Publicity photo c. 1950
- Born: Clarence Church Campbell; 13 July 1891; Ottawa, Canada
- Died: 25 April 1952 (aged 60); Ipswich, Suffolk, England
- Other name: Zeke Winters
- Occupations: Broadcaster, bandleader, entertainer
- Years active: c.1930–1952

Clarence Church Campbell (13 July 1891 – 25 April 1952), known professionally as Big Bill Campbell and sometimes in character as "Zeke Winters", was a Canadian entertainer and broadcaster who popularised Western music, especially on radio in Britain from the 1930s until he died in 1952.

== Biography ==
Campbell was born in Carleton, Ottawa, Ontario, in 1891, according to official records. However, he sometimes falsely claimed to have been born in Medicine Hat, Alberta, and gave a birth year of 1888. He studied in Belfast, fought in Europe during the First World War, and after his first marriage and divorce in Canada, returned to settle in England in 1930.

He formed a group to perform Canadian and American "cowboy songs" in variety shows. He made his first radio show on the BBC, presenting "The Rocky Mountaineers" and playing the part of "Zeke Winters" in 1935. He also presented programmes on Radio Luxembourg from 1938. Campbell's role was that of bandleader, compere, raconteur, and occasional singer, and he was known for his comment, "Mighty fine!" after every song. He led a group of mostly British musicians, variously known as "His Hilly-Billy Band", "Hill-Billy Round-Up," or "Rocky Mountain Rhythm", ostensibly presented from his "old log cabin." Many of the shows featured comic sketches and stereotypical characters such as "The Yodelling Buckaroo", Norman Harper; “Chief White Eagle,” Jack Curtis; and "The Sweet Voice of the West", Peggy Bailey.

Campbell toured widely in Britain and made some recordings for the Columbia label. From 1948, he wrote and presented serial radio stories on similar western themes.

Campbell died in 1952, aged 60, from a heart attack while on tour in Ipswich. At the time, he was described as "one of Britain's most popular stage and radio stars."
