= On Camera (album) =

On camera...Patti Page...favorites from TV

Studio album by Patti Page
- Released: 1959
- Genre: Traditional pop
- Label: Mercury

On camera...Patti Page...favorites from TV was a 1959 Patti Page LP, issued by Mercury Records as catalog number SR-60025.

It featured the most requested songs from viewers of her weekly TV show, and was with Jack Rael & His Orchestra. It was re-released on CD in 2005.

== Track listing ==
| No. | Title | Length |
|---|---|---|
| 1. | "It's A Pity To Say Goodnight (Billy Reid) - 2:07" |
| 2. | "It's A Good Day (Peggy Lee, Dave Barbour) - 1:49" |
| 3. | "When Day Is Done (Buddy DeSylva, Robert Katscher) - 2:40" |
| 4. | "(I Wanna Go Where You Go, Do What You Do) Then I'll Be Happy (Cliff Friend, Lew Brown, Sidney Clare) - 1:47" |
| 5. | "Happy Days Are Here Again (Milton Ager, Jack Yellen) - 2:40" |
| 6. | "Sometimes I'm Happy (Sometimes I'm Blue) (Vincent Youmans, Irving Caesar) - 1:34" |
| 7. | "The Gypsy (Billy Reid) - 2:31" |
| 8. | "(I Love You) For Sentimental Reasons (Ivory "Deek" Watson, William "Pat" Best) - 3:07" |
| 9. | "I Didn't Know What Time It Was (Richard Rodgers, Lorenz Hart) - 2:39" |
| 10. | "Crazy Rhythm (Irving Caesar, Joseph Meyer, and Roger Wolfe Kahn) - 2:13" |
| 11. | "Darling, Je Vous Aime Beaucoup (Anna Sosenko) - 2:53" |
| 12. | "The Gypsy In My Soul (Clay Boland, Moe Jaffe) - 1:24" |
