= Dance Band =

1935 British film by Marcel Varnel

- U.S. theatrical poster
- Directed by: Marcel Varnel
- Written by: Denis Waldock; Roger Burford; Jack Davies
- Produced by: Walter C. Mycroft
- Starring: Charles "Buddy" Rogers; June Clyde; Steven Geray
- Cinematography: Bryan Langley
- Edited by: Sidney Cole
- Music by: Harry Acres (musical director)
- Production company: British International Pictures
- Distributed by: Wardour Films
- Release date: 29 May 1935 (London)
- Running time: 75 minutes
- Country: United Kingdom
- Language: English

Dance Band is a 1935 British musical film directed by Marcel Varnel and starring Charles "Buddy" Rogers, June Clyde and Steven Geray. It was written by Denis Waldock, Roger Burford and Jack Davies, and shot at Welwyn Studios with sets designed by the art director David Rawnsley.

== Plot ==
When dance band leader Buddy Milton competes in a contest with a female orchestra, he falls in love with its leader, Pat Shelley. Intense rivalry between the two bands and the machinations of a crooked business manager, serve as romantic obstacles along the way.

== Cast ==
- Charles "Buddy" Rogers as Buddy Milton
- June Clyde as Pat Shelley
- Steven Geray as Steve Sarel
- Magda Kun as Anna
- Fred Duprez as Lewis
- Albert Whelan as Tommy Bourne
- Sybil Jason as little girl on train
- Hal Gordon as Spike
- Fred Groves as pantomime act
- Leon Sherkot as Jim
- Richard Hearne as acrobatic drunk
- Jack Holland as dancer at club
- June Hart as dancer at club

== Critical reception ==
The Monthly Film Bulletin wrote: "The thoroughly enjoyable nature of this film does not depend upon any one outstanding element; it is simply a straightforward, thoroughly competent piece of romanticism that is neither sentimental nor hyper-sophisticated. The plot is no more convincing than a dream, but the direction induces a light-hearted mood that makes one accept and enjoy every moment."

The Daily Film Renter wrote: "Slender plot supported by aggregation of first-class speciality acts, plus dance combinations and syncopated music. Whole subject is frothy affair, lavish cabaret and theatre settings giving superficial glitter. Attractively presented with melodious tunes and effective romantic values. Light and airy confection that is sure to please the general run of patrons."

The New York Times wrote, "In Dance Band, the new film at the Fox Theatre in Brooklyn, Charles (Buddy) Rogers resumes the boyish smile and mannerisms that he employed so successfully a few years ago. Rather more successful as a musician than as a romantic actor, he displays his versatility by playing almost every instrument in his jazz orchestra with skill. The story concerns two rival band leaders, Mr. Rogers and June Clyde, who meet under amusing if rather shopworn circumstances...T he music, except for an excellent number called the Valparaiso, is commonplace."
