= Charlie Higgins (comedian) =

British comedian

- Born: Charles Robert Higginson; 23 July 1892; Ancoats, Manchester, England
- Died: 5 February 1978 (aged 85); Mill Hill, London
- Occupation: Comedian
- Years active: c.1920–1950

Charlie Higgins (born Charles Robert Higginson; 23 July 1892 – 5 February 1978) was a British comedian. While largely forgotten today, he was one of the most popular British comedians of the early 1930s.

== Biography ==
Higgins was born in Ancoats, Manchester in 1892 (though some sources erroneously give Liverpool) the only son of Robert and Sarah Higginson, joining his older sister Annie. Their father worked in the iron works, whilst Charlie and his sister both started work in a cotton mill at a young age. Charlie married Florence Rogers (1898–1921) in July 1921; they had no children.

After service in the First World War, Charlie became part of a double act with his wartime colleague Charles Robert St Juste, and were known as The King's Jesters. They toured the music halls, their act including singing, whistling and comedy. The double act broke up in 1925 but Higgins continued to be successful alone, and toured the country in revues with a combination of comic acting and singing. A review from the Portsmouth Evening News in 1926 said: "Charlie Higgins is a new type of comedian who does not rely upon jokes of doubtful character to provoke laughter but who abounds in witticisms which are really funny." His most successful revue was Out of Work in 1926, a show written for him by fellow comedian Billy Bennett, and in which Higgins played a shop worker who lost his job and tried but failed at various other occupations.

He established himself as a comedian from about 1930, billed as "A fool if only he knew it", and with a distinctive costume of top hat, plus-fours and brown boots. He often performed with a sidekick, such as Bert Bray (c.1886–1938), as a double act. In his day he played the part of someone who is down in their luck. He was a master of facial expressions.

His first recording, "With Me Gloves In Me 'And", was made in 1930. He was a popular recording comedian from the early to the mid-1930s. In the 1930s Higgins released at least twenty records, mostly on the Broadcast label and the last few on the Rex label. Despite lack of modern recognition, he was a very successful recording comedian and performed at an All Star Non Stop Variety Show in 1934. He played at the London Palladium three times in the 1930s and also appeared on radio, and on the TV programmes Variety, Cabaret and Comedy Cabaret in 1938.

He retired in the early 1950s to his home in Mill Hill, north west London, and died on 5 February 1978. In his obituary, The Stage described him as having a "unique style".

His recordings were later released on CD.

== List of songs ==
- With Me Gloves in Me 'And, me hat on one side (1930) – This was his first record and most successful.
- In The Waxworks Late Last Night (1930)
- Down In The Field Where the Buttercups All Grow (1931)
- Running Up and Down our street (1931)
- The Girls of the old brigade (1931)
- Sh! There's a Ghost In The House (1931)
- Down In The Old Churchyard (1931)
- Charlie's Saxophone (1931)
- I'm a daddy at 63 (1931)
- Charlie In Spain (1931)
- The Day I went to Wembley for the Cup-Tie (1931)
- Maggie and me and the baby (1931)
- With Me Bagful of nuts and Some sweets in my Mouth (1932)
- Jolly Old Uncle Joe (1932)
- Mrs. McGrath and Mrs. O'Rafferty (1932)
- Charlie Goes Shopping on Saturday Night (1932)
- Bumpity Bump Again (1932)
- Round at her mother's on Sunday (1932)
- That's why women were born (1932)
- When I was twenty-one (1932)
- Mother's walking around in Father's Trousers (1933)
- Where The Violets are blue-oo and the roses are red (1933)
- Charlie Makes Whoopee! (1933)-Also featuring Bert Bray
- Charlie's Breach and Promise case (1933)-Also featuring Bert Bray
- All Poshed up with me Daises in my hand (1934)
- Navvies' Jazz (1934)

"She's Leading Me Up The Garden" (1934) (Lost)
