= Vernon Watson =

British entertainer (1885–1949)

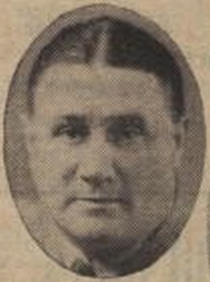
- As Nosmo King, circa 1946
- Born: Samuel Vernon Watson; 5 February 1885; Thorney, Cambridgeshire, England
- Died: 13 January 1949 (aged 63); Chelsea, London, England
- Resting place: Thorney Cemetery
- Other name: Nosmo King
- Occupation: Variety artist

Samuel Vernon Watson (5 February 1885–13 January 1949), better known under his stage name Nosmo King, and cited in some sources as H. Vernon Watson, was a popular English variety artist. He was touring the music halls before World War I, but he remained relatively obscure until the 1920s, when he went by Nosmo King. He was the father of actor Jack Watson.

== Early years ==
After growing up in a rural area near Peterborough, Watson initially worked as a bank clerk. He showed a leaning towards things theatrical and it was evident that he had a rare talent for mimicry. In 1911, he turned professional, using his real name, doing impressions of the leading comedians of the day.

Then, when Frank Tinney, the American blackface comedian, came to the UK, Watson added an impression of him to his repertoire. He noticed that this impression gained him great applause, and when Tinney returned to the United States, Watson gave thought to a different style of act based on a black-faced personality.

== Fame ==
Opportunity for this came about in the early 1930s in Leeds, in the West Riding of Yorkshire, England, which boasted two variety theatres, run by two rival organisations. The Great Depression was beginning to bite, and on hearing that the rival theatre had lost its comic, he determined to double his income by doing both shows (four performances a night), travelling between the two theatres by taxi, disguising himself by blacking up.

Watson had the black-face study ready, but was stuck for a name. Then inspiration came to his aid. The scene dock doors backstage were partly open and the two halves read "No Smo" & "king". That was it. From then on, the character would be Nosmo King.

Nosmo King became a huge star and a household name. The stage act of Nosmo King & Hubert developed when his son Jack Watson joined him as straight man directly from school. Vernon Watson transitioned to performing as Nosmo for good when his speciality became long comic monologues.

During a later interview, he made two remarkable confessions. Someone pointed out that a cigar-smoking figure was hardly compatible with the name and suggested that he give up. This he found remarkably difficult, but he eventually accomplished it with the aid of snuff. The second confession was that he had never at any time set eyes on Frank Tinney.

During World War II, Nosmo King reverted to going solo, the reason being that his son, playing "Hubert," had joined up.

The end came for Nosmo King early in 1949 when Watson died in his sleep in his Chelsea flat. He is buried in Thorney Cemetery near Peterborough, with "Nosmo King" on his headstone.

== Acts ==
One of Nosmo's act starters was when a young pageboy would come over to him carrying his luggage. Once he had handed it to Nosmo, Nosmo would say to him "how much do I owe you" and the boy would say "2 nicker" (a colloquialism for two pounds) whilst making a V sign at him. Nosmo took this as an insult and would slap the boy across the face, then the boy would slap Nosmo across his face in return.

== See also ==
- Paul Shannon, a Pittsburgh radio announcer, also used the name 'Nosmo King' for a character.
- Nosmo King was the name of a 1994 album by jazz guitarist John Abercrombie and Andy LaVerne.
