= BBC Television Orchestra =

- Orchestra
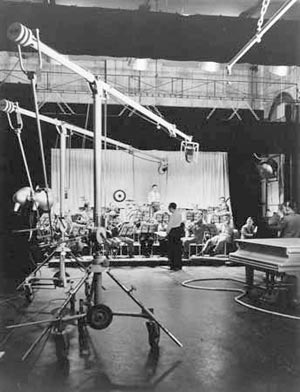
- Hyam Greenbaum and the BBC Television Orchestra in a test broadcast to Radiolympia, August 1936
- Founded: 1936; 90 years ago
- Disbanded: September 1939; 87 years ago
- Later name: BBC Revue Orchestra
- Location: United Kingdom

The BBC Television Orchestra (1936–1939) was a broadcast orchestra founded in 1936 by conductor, violinist and composer Hyam Greenbaum and led by Boris Pecker. Greenbaum's wife Sidonie Goossens was the first solo harpist with the Orchestra in that year.

It was disbanded in September 1939 when the outbreak of the Second World War caused the BBC Television service to be suspended so as not to create a VHF beacon for German bombers. After that Greenbaum used a nucleus of its players to form the BBC Revue Orchestra, playing light variety music for BBC radio from its base in Bangor, North Wales.

Its successor, the BBC Revue Orchestra, was amalgamated with the BBC Variety Orchestra in 1964 to form the BBC Radio Orchestra.

== Performances ==
The orchestra played on the first ever programme broadcast when regular British television broadcasts commenced on 26 August 1936 to an estimated 123,000 viewers. The orchestra also played on the opening day of BBC Television high-definition broadcast on Monday, 2 November 1936, with Adele Dixon performing the song "Television" live on its launch programme. For the three years of its life the orchestra's repertoire was wide, ranging from music for drama productions through to a televised adaptation of Wagner's Tristan and Isolde in two, one hour sections on 24 January 1938.

They have also been musicians on the BBC production "The Mercury Ballet".

== See also ==
- List of radio orchestras
- BBC Orchestras and Singers
- BBC Radio Orchestra
