= Hyam Greenbaum =

English conductor, violinist and composer

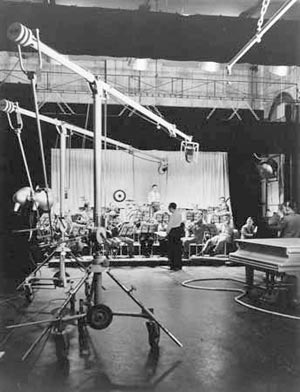
- Hyam Greenbaum and the BBC Television Orchestra in a test broadcast from Alexandra Palace television station to audiences at Radiolympia
- Born: Hyam Greenbaum; 12 May 1901; Brighton, England
- Died: 13 May 1942 (aged 41); Bangor, Wales
- Occupations: Conductor, composer, violinist
- Years active: 1916–1942
- Known for: First conductor of a television orchestra
- Spouse: Sidonie Goossens
- Relatives: Kyla Greenbaum (sister), Bernard Greenbaum (brother)

Hyam 'Bumps' Greenbaum (12 May 1901 – 13 May 1942) was an English conductor, violinist and composer, who, in 1936, became the world's first conductor of a television orchestra. He was friendly with many of his English music contemporaries, including Constant Lambert, Alan Rawsthorne, and William Walton, and often helped them with technical advice on orchestration. His brother Bernard (1917–1993) was an artist, and his sister was the pianist and composer Kyla Greenbaum (1922–2017).

== Early career ==
As a child, Greenbaum was taught violin by his English mother Edith (née Etherington) and piano by his father (Solomon Greenbaum, a Jewish Russian born in Poland and sent to England to train as a tailor). He made his musical debut in Brighton at the age of seven, playing the Beethoven Violin Concerto in a velvet suit and lace collar. He studied at the Brighton School of Music before winning an open scholarship to the Royal College of Music in 1912, aged eleven. His nickname 'Bumps' was coined after a phrenologist "had expressed amazement at the configurations of his cranium".

Although he had ambitions to become a conductor from the start, Greenbaum began his musical career in 1916 leading the second violins in the Queen's Hall Orchestra, and from 1923 until 1936 played second violin and piano for the Diaghilev Ballet. In 1924 he joined the Brosa String Quartet playing second violin.

Greenbaum married the harpist Sidonie Goossens on 26 April 1924 at Kensington Registry Office and they set up home in a first floor flat on the Fulham Road, opposite Michelin House. Greenbaum was a member of the "Warlock Gang", followers of composer and music critic Peter Warlock (Philip Heseltine). Others were Cecil Gray, E. J. Moeran, Constant Lambert and Leslie Heward. It has been suggested that Heseltine's influence led to Greenbaum's heavy drinking habit. At the beginning of 1929 Greenbaum and Sidonie moved to a larger flat on the top floor of 5, Wetherby Gardens, SW5, which became a regular meeting place for an expanded circle of hard-drinking musicians, also including Arnold Bax, Patrick Hadley, Spike Hughes, Alan Rawsthorne and William Walton.

== Stage and television ==
From 1930 until 1934 he was a music director for C. B. Cochran on London productions such as Jerome Kern's The Cat and the Fiddle (March 1932, 219 performances), George Kaufman and Edna Ferber's Dinner at Eight (January 1933, 218 performances), Kern's Music in the Air (May 1933, 275 performances) and Cole Porter's Nymph Errant (October 1933, 154 performances). In the early 1930s he also joined Decca as a recording manager.

In 1936 Greenbaum applied for the post of musical director, BBC Television Service, and with support from Adrian Boult was appointed. He founded the BBC Television Orchestra, which played on the inaugural programme when regular British television broadcasts commenced on 26 August 1936 to an estimated 123,000 viewers. This was the first high-definition standard (405 lines) television test transmission, with the orchestra broadcasting from Alexandra Palace to the Radiolympia exhibition being held at Olympia London. The orchestra also played on the official opening day of BBC Television's high-definition broadcasting on 2 November 1936. He also was the orchestra conductor on the BBC productions "The Mercury Ballet" and "Cabaret". Its repertoire was wide, ranging from music for drama productions through to a televised adaptation of Tristan und Isolde (in two one-hour sections) on 24 January 1938.

Greenbaum, with a group of others at the BBC (including Stephen Thomas, Dallas Bower, Desmond Davis and members of the British Music Drama Opera Company), presented an astonishing 29 operas on television between 1936 and 1939. Manuel de Falla's puppet opera El retablo de maese Pedro was broadcast on 29 May 1938. In 1939 when Bower directed The Tempest with Peggy Ashcroft and George Devine, Greenbaum conducted the Sibelius incidental music, heard for the first time in its theatrical context. The same year the first staged performance in England of Busoni's opera Arlecchino was broadcast, also conducted by Greenbaum.

== Wartime and death ==
The BBC Television Orchestra was disbanded in September 1939 at the outbreak of World War II when television services were suspended. Greenbaum and his wife moved to Bristol, living with Alan Rawsthorne and his first wife Jessie Hinchcliffe at the Clifton Arts Club. This was bombed in November 1940, and many of Rawsthorne's manuscripts were destroyed. Greenbaum used a nucleus of the Television Orchestra members to form the BBC Revue Orchestra, playing light variety music for BBC radio from its base in Bangor, North Wales. According to Sidonie he "hated Bangor and he hated variety work. Away from me he was tempted to drink more and more. He lived in a pub and once set his bed on fire there."

However, there were occasionally chances to record more challenging repertoire for the BBC Symphony Orchestra. For instance on 19 November 1941, at the insistence of Adrian Boult, he conducted Franz Liszt's symphonic poem Orpheus and Ferruccio Busoni's Violin Concerto. The following day he conducted a studio concert in Bedford featuring Bartok's Divertimento for Strings.

Greenbaum died of alcohol-related problems, one day after his 41st birthday, the alcoholism fueled by his career difficulties and depression resulting from the still birth of their only son. Cecil Gray wrote: "There is no more tragic figure than the great interpretive artist who has never been given a chance to reveal his powers. Such was Hyam Greenbaum."

== Composition and orchestration ==
As a composer, Greenbaum achieved some recognition with his Parfum de la Nuit, a three-movement suite for oboe and orchestra written for Leon Goossens and performed at the Proms on 12 October 1922. He then conducted the premiere of his orchestral piece A Sea Poem at the 1923 Proms, repeating it the following year.

However, his greatest contributions to contemporary music came from his conducting and orchestration work, and from helping other composers at difficult times in the composition process. He orchestrated some of William Walton's film scores, including Escape Me Never in 1935 and As You Like It in 1936 and assisted Walton with both the Viola Concerto and the Symphony No 1. Similarly, he helped Constant Lambert complete his choral work Summer's Last Will and Testament, also standing in as conductor for the second performance when Lambert was too ill to appear himself. Lambert inscribed the vocal score he gave to Greenbaum: "To Hyam Greenbaum (who as far as I remember wrote most of this work) from Constant Lambert".
