= Shower of Stars (Australian TV series) =

- Genre: Variety
- Country of origin: Australia
- Original language: English

Production
- Running time: 60 minutes

Original release
- Release: 1959

Shower of Stars is an Australian television series which aired in 1959 on Sydney station ATN-7. It was a variety show with comedy and music, and regulars included Hal Lashwood, Syd Heylen, and Al Thomas. It was originally presented live on Tuesdays at 10:00PM, but later moved to Fridays. It was a 60-minute black-and-white series, running time excluding commercials is unknown. Archival status is unknown.
