= Western Cabaret =

1939 British TV variety series

- Genre: Variety
- Created by: Harry Pringle
- Based on: Cabaret
- Presented by: Big Bill Campbell
- Country of origin: England
- Original language: English
- No. of episodes: 4

Production
- Producer: Harry Pringle
- Running time: 45–50 minutes
- Production company: BBC Television

Original release
- Network: BBC Television
- Release: 10 January – 18 August 1939

Western Cabaret is a live variety programme series broadcast in 1939 on BBC Television. It was one of several spin-offs from the BBC series Cabaret. It was compered by Big Bill Campbell and produced by Harry Pringle. Four episodes were broadcast. (Note: Internet Movie Database (IMDb) reports five episodes. According to Radio Times, one of those five, broadcast on 12 January 1939, was a repeat performance of the very first episode, broadcast on 10 January, with one change of artist.) The BBC television service was suspended on 1 September 1939 with the outbreak of World War II, and no further episodes were made.

The Radio Times said that the television studio "will be turned into a camp clearing, with a glowing camp-fire and log huts, and all the artists will be introduced as though they were part of the place".

No episodes have survived. (Note: The show was broadcast live. Methods for recording live television did not exist until late 1947, and were used very rarely by the BBC until around 1953–55.)

== Performers ==
As of February 2016, the following performers who appeared in Western Cabaret are subjects of Wikipedia articles. The numbers of episodes in which they appeared are given in parentheses (treating the broadcasts of 10 January and 12 January as a single episode).

- Gladys (1903–92) and Will Ahern (1896–1983), American comedy duo (1)
- Chief White Eagle (1917–2011), Canadian-born American actor (1)
- Evelyn Dall (1918–2010), American singer (2)
- Claude Dampier (1879–1955), English actor and comedian (1)
- Bob Dyer (1909–84), Australian singer (1)
- Ted North (1916–75), American actor (3)
