= On Camera (Australian TV series) =

- Genre: Variety
- Starring: Colin Croft; John Ewart
- Country of origin: Australia
- Original language: English

Original release
- Network: ATN-7
- Release: 1959 – 1960

On Camera is an Australian television which aired 1959–1960 on Sydney station ATN-7. A variety series with music and comedy, regulars included Colin Croft and John Ewart. It was shown twice-monthly. Confusingly, the Canadian series On Camera had previously been shown on Australian television.

It is not known if any of the episodes still exist as kinescope recordings or early video-tape.
