= Eastern Cabaret =

British TV variety series (1938–1939)

- Genre: Variety
- Created by: Harry Pringle
- Based on: Cabaret
- Presented by: Cyril Fletcher; Hari Sin Bey
- Country of origin: England
- Original language: English
- No. of episodes: 3

Production
- Producer: Harry Pringle
- Running time: 45–50 minutes
- Production company: BBC Television

Original release
- Network: BBC Television
- Release: 30 May 1938 – 6 May 1939

Eastern Cabaret is a live variety programme series broadcast 1938–1939 on BBC Television. It was one of several spin-offs from the BBC series Cabaret. Four episodes were broadcast; (Note: Each episode had a repeat performance within a week.) they were produced by Harry Pringle, the first was compered by Nelun Devi, the next two were compered by Cyril Fletcher, and the last by Hari Sin Bey. The BBC television service was suspended on 1 September 1939 with the outbreak of World War II, and no further episodes were made.

According to Radio Times (20 May 1938), "Harry Pringle, Reginald Smith's officemate, is having a busy time preparing for his Eastern Cabaret, to be given next week on Monday, 30 May, and Saturday, 4 June. One of his difficulties was getting snakes without temperament and susceptible to the charms of native charmers. He went to five different agencies and gave auditions to thirty-two snakes, and even then failed to find a satisfactory performer". A later entry in Radio Times suggests that this may not have been entirely serious, saying that the background had been "codded" (i.e. parodied) by compere Cyril Fletcher.

No episodes have survived. (Note: The show was broadcast live. Methods for recording live television did not exist until late 1947, and were used very rarely by the BBC until around 1953–55.)

== Performers ==
As of February 2016, the following performers who appeared in Eastern Cabaret are subjects of Wikipedia articles. The numbers of episodes in which they appeared are given in parentheses (treating repeat performances as a single episode).

- Cyril Fletcher (1913–2005), English compere (2)
- Wilbur Hall and Renée Fields, American comedy musicians (1)
- Stanley Holloway (1890–1982), English comedian (1)
