= Radiolympia =

Coordinates: 51°29′47″N 0°12′35″W

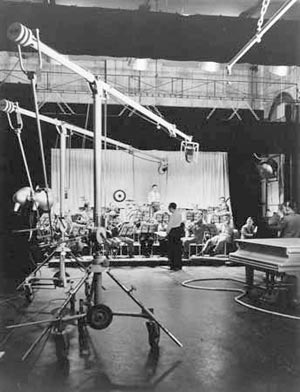
Hyam Greenbaum and the BBC Television Orchestra in a test broadcast from Alexandra Palace television station to audiences at Radiolympia

Radiolympia, also known as the Radio Show, was a pioneering exhibition of radio equipment, latterly television equipment, held annually at Olympia in London, England, in the 1920s to 1940s, except for a period of interruption during World War II.

The first such exhibition was held in 1926.

On 26 August 1936, the first high-definition standard (Baird 240 lines) television transmission was made in a test by the BBC to the exhibition from the BBC's studios in Alexandra Palace. The day after, the Marconi-EMI (405 lines) system was used.

The record attendance was 238,000 in 1934.
