= Magda Kun =

Hungarian actress (1912–1945)

- Born: 17 February 1912; Szászrégen, Transleithania, Austria-Hungary (now Reghin, Romania)
- Died: 7 November 1945 (aged 33); London, England
- Occupation: Actress
- Years active: 1932–1945 (film)
- Spouse: Steven Geray (m. 1934)

Magda Kun (17 February 1912 – 7 November 1945) was a Hungarian stage and film actress. She was born in Szászrégen and made her stage debut in Budapest. She married actor Steven Geray in 1934, appearing alongside him in the 1935 film Dance Band. Kun died in 1945, in London, aged 33 years.

== Selected filmography ==
- The Old Scoundrel (1932)
- And the Plains Are Gleaming (1933)
- Dance Band (1934)
- Family Bonus (1937)
- Modern Girls (1937)
- Old Mother Riley in Paris (1938)
- Room for Two (1939)
- Old Mother Riley Overseas (1943)
- Heaven Is Round the Corner (1944)
- Meet Sexton Blake! (1945)
- Dead of Night (1945)

== Bibliography ==
- Hodgson, Michael. Patricia Roc. Author House, 2013.
