= Irene Prador =

Austrian actress and writer (1911–1996)

- Irene Prador in 1964
- Born: Irene Peiser; 16 July 1911; Vienna, Austria
- Died: 8 July 1996 (aged 84); Berlin, Germany
- Occupations: actress and writer

Irene Prador (née Peiser; 16 July 1911, in Vienna – 8 July 1996, in Berlin) was a German-born actress and writer.

== Biography ==
Prador was born as Irene Peiser, the daughter of Dr. Alfred Peiser and actress Rose Lissmann, and sister of actress Lilli Palmer. She emigrated to France in 1933, following the rise of Nazism; and appeared in cabaret there with her sister. She later worked in revue, film and theatre in England, America and Germany, and appeared in several programmes on BBC Television.

== Filmography ==
- 1937: Let's Make a Night of It - Specialty Act (uncredited)
- 1937: Ad Lib (TV Movie)
- 1939: Rake's Progress (TV Movie) - Maria Bellini, of the Neapolitan Opera
- 1948: No Orchids for Miss Blandish - Olga-Johnny's Girl
- 1950: The Compelled People (TV Movie) - Emmy
- 1950: Lilli Marlene - Nurse Schmidt
- 1952: Something Money Can't Buy - German maid
- 1956: Lost - Mitzi
- 1956: The Battle of the River Plate - (uncredited)
- 1958: Carve Her Name with Pride - Prisoner (uncredited)
- 1958: The Snorkel - French Woman (uncredited)
- 1959: Jet Storm - Sophia Gelderen
- 1960: Danger Man - Episode "Position of Trust" - Mrs. Aldrich
- 1961: The Devil's Daffodil - Maisie (uncredited)
- 1962: The Saint (Episode: "The Charitable Countess") - Signora Vespa
- 1969: A Nice Girl Like Me - Mme. Dupont
- 1971: The Last Valley - Frau Hoffman
- 1972: Crown Court
- 1975: The Hiding Place - Wrochek
- 1976: To the Devil a Daughter - German Matron
- 1978: Holocaust (TV Mini-Series) - Maria Kalova
- 1981: Lady Killers (1981) - Louisa Blatch
- 1982: Night Crossing - Mrs. Roseler
- 1983: Auf Wiedersehen Pet - Helmut's Mother
- 1986: Dear John (TV Series, 7 episodes) - Mrs Lemenski
- 1987: Treacle (BAFTA nominated: Best Short Film) - Rosa
- 1992: Lovejoy (Episode: "The Prague Sun") - Lila
