= Steven Geray =

Hungarian-American actor (1904–1973)

- 1940s portrait
- Born: István Gyergyai; 10 November 1904; Ungvár, Austria-Hungary (now Uzhhorod, Ukraine)
- Died: 26 December 1973 (aged 69); Los Angeles, California, U.S.
- Occupation: Actor
- Years active: 1929–1966
- Spouses: Magda Kun (m. 1934; div. 1942) Roanne Ollafay Threet (m. 1951–1973)

Steven Geray (born István Gyergyai, 10 November 1904 – 26 December 1973) was a Hungarian-born American character actor who appeared in over 100 films and dozens of television programs. Geray appeared in numerous famed A and AA-budgeted pictures, including Alfred Hitchcock's Spellbound (1945) and To Catch a Thief (1955), Joseph L. Mankiewicz's All About Eve (1950), and Howard Hawks's Gentlemen Prefer Blondes (1953). However, it was in film noir that he became a fixture, being cast in over a dozen pictures in the genre. Among them were The Mask of Dimitrios (1944), Gilda (1946), The Unfaithful (1947), In a Lonely Place (1950), and The House on Telegraph Hill (1951).

== Early life ==
Geray was born István Gyergyai in Ungvár, Austria-Hungary (now Uzhhorod, Ukraine) and educated at the University of Budapest.

== Career ==
Geray (left) with Glenn Ford and Rita Hayworth in Gilda (1946

Geray made his first stage appearance at the Hungarian National Theater under his real name and after nearly four years he made his London stage debut (as Steven Geray) in 1934, appearing in Happy Week-End! He began appearing in English-speaking films in 1935 and moved to Hollywood in 1941. He appeared alongside his wife, Magda Kun, whom he married in 1934, in the 1935 film Dance Band. Political pressure led to Geray's exit from Europe. His act in the Folies Bergère included impersonations of Adolf Hitler and Benito Mussolini, which incurred the wrath of the governments of Germany and Italy. Geray failed to heed their warnings to stop the impersonations. After being beaten up, however, he moved to Hollywood.

Geray was cast as the lead in a low-budget film noir So Dark the Night (1946). Even with its limited budget, it received positive critical reviews and enabled its director Joseph H. Lewis to later direct A-pictures.

During his prime in cinema Geray appeared in many top-rated movies, including Alfred Hitchcock's Spellbound (1945) and To Catch a Thief (1955), Joseph L. Mankiewicz's All About Eve (1950), and Howard Hawks' Gentlemen Prefer Blondes (1953). He found a niche in crime and adventure films such as Background to Danger (1943), Appointment in Berlin (1943), and A Bullet for Joey (1955), but it was in film noir that he became a fixture. Among his films in the genre were The Mask of Dimitrios (1944), Cornered (1945), Deadline at Dawn (1946), Gilda (1946), The Unfaithful (1947), The Dark Past (1948), In a Lonely Place (1950), The Second Woman (1950), A Lady Without Passport (1950), Woman on the Run (1950), The House on Telegraph Hill (1951), Affair in Trinidad (1952), and New York Confidential (1955).

Geray continued to work on television and in films into the 1960s. He appeared on Perry Mason in 1962, as extortionist and murder victim Franz Moray in "The Case of the Stand-in Sister"; on The George Burns and Gracie Allen Show, in three 1956 episodes (including the over-the-top "A Paris Creation") as French dress designer Gaston Broussard; and on The Danny Thomas Show, in various doctor roles.

== Personal life ==
Geray died 26 December 1973 in Los Angeles, California. He was cremated, and his ashes were given to his wife.

== Selected filmography ==
- Mária növér (1929)
- Kiss Me, Darling (1932) - Pali, medikus
- Spring Shower (1932) - Urasági intéző
- Flying Gold (1932) - Bálint György, az Esti Hírek újságírója
- Romance in Budapest (1933)
- Stolen Wednesday (1933) - Tamás István, rádióriporter
- Dance Band (1935) - Steve Sarel
- The Student's Romance (1935) - Mickey
- A Star Fell from Heaven (1936) - Willi Wass
- Let's Make a Night of It (1937) - Luigi
- Modern Girls (1937) - Székely Feri
- Family Bonus (1937) - Kovács Péter
- Premiere (1938) - Frolich
- Lightning Conductor (1938) - Morley
- Inspector Hornleigh (1939) - Michael Kavanos
- Dark Streets of Cairo (1940) - Bellboy
- Man at Large (1941) - Karl Botany, alias C.B. Haldane
- The Shanghai Gesture (1941) - Man in Casino Helping Boris (uncredited)
- Blue, White and Perfect (1942) - Vanderhoefen
- A Gentleman at Heart (1942) - Don Fernando
- Castle in the Desert (1942) - Dr. Retling
- Secret Agent of Japan (1942) - Alecsandri
- The Wife Takes a Flyer (1942) - Gestapo Agent (uncredited)
- The Mad Martindales (1942) - Jan Van Der Venne
- Eyes in the Night (1942) - Mr. Anderson
- The Moon and Sixpence (1942) - Dirk Stroeve
- Once Upon a Honeymoon (1942) - Café Waiter (uncredited)
- Assignment in Brittany (1943) - Priest (uncredited)
- Above Suspicion (1943) - Anton - Woodcarver (uncredited)
- Heavenly Music (1943) - Ludwig van Beethoven
- Night Plane from Chungking (1943) - Rev. Dr. Ven Der Lieden
- Henry Aldrich Swings It (1943) - Frank 'Silky' Ganz (uncredited)
- Pilot #5 (1943) - Major Eichel
- Background to Danger (1943) - Ludwig Rader (uncredited)
- Appointment in Berlin (1943) - Henri Rader (uncredited)
- Hostages (1943) - Mueller
- Phantom of the Opera (1943) - Vercheres
- Whistling in Brooklyn (1943) - Whitey
- Meet the People (1944) - Uncle Felix
- The Mask of Dimitrios (1944) - Karel Bulic
- The Seventh Cross (1944) - Dr. Loewenstein
- Resisting Enemy Interrogation (1944) - Dr. Victor Münz - Camp Doctor (uncredited)
- In Society (1944) - Baron Sergei
- The Conspirators (1944) - Dr. Schmitt
- Hotel Berlin (1945) - Kleibert
- Tarzan and the Amazons (1945) - Brenner
- Spellbound (1945) - Dr. Graff
- The Crimson Canary (1945) - Vic Miller
- Mexicana (1945) - Laredo
- Cornered (1945) - Señor Tomas Camargo
- Deadline at Dawn (1946) - Edward Honig
- Gilda (1946) - Uncle Pio
- So Dark the Night (1946) - Henri Cassin
- Blondie Knows Best (1946) - Dr. Schmidt
- The Return of Monte Cristo (1946) - Bombelles
- The Unfaithful (1947) - Martin Barrow
- Blind Spot (1947) - Lloyd Harrison
- Mr. District Attorney (1947) - Berotti
- Gunfighters (1947) - Jose - aka Uncle Joe
- When a Girl's Beautiful (1947) - Stacy Dorn
- The Crime Doctor's Gamble (1947) - Jules Daudet
- I Love Trouble (1948) - Keller
- Port Said (1948) - Alexis Tacca
- The Dark Past (1948) - Prof. Fred Linder
- Ladies of the Chorus (1948) - Salisbury
- The Lone Wolf and His Lady (1949) - Mynher Van Groot
- El Paso (1949) - Mexican Joe
- Sky Liner (1949) - Bokejian
- Once More, My Darling (1949) - Kalzac
- Holiday in Havana (1949) - Lopez
- Tell It to the Judge (1949) - Francois, Headwaiter (uncredited)
- Under My Skin (1950) - Bartender (uncredited)
- Harbor of Missing Men (1950) - Captain Corcoris
- Beware of Blondie (1950) - Matre'd Coq D'or (uncredited)
- In a Lonely Place (1950) - Paul, Headwaiter
- The Second Woman (1950) - Balthazar Jones
- A Lady Without Passport (1950) - Frenchman, Palinov's Tout
- Woman on the Run (1950) - Dr. Hohler
- All About Eve (1950) - Captain of Waiters
- Pygmy Island (1950) - Leon Marko
- Target Unknown (1951) - Jean
- I Can Get It for You Wholesale (1951) - Bettini (uncredited)
- The House on Telegraph Hill (1951) - Dr. Burkhardt
- Savage Drums (1951) - Borodoff
- Little Egypt (1951) - Pasha
- My Favorite Spy (1951) - Croupier (uncredited)
- Lady Possessed (1952) - Dr. Stepanek
- Bal Tabarin (1952) - Inspector Manet
- Affair in Trinidad (1952) - Wittol
- The Big Sky (1952) - 'Frenchy' Jourdonnais
- O. Henry's Full House (1952) - Boris Radolf (segment "The Last Leaf") (uncredited)
- Night Without Sleep (1952) - George (uncredited)
- Tonight We Sing (1953) - Prager
- The Story of Three Loves (1953) - Legay (segment "Equilibrium") (uncredited)
- Call Me Madam (1953) - Prime Minister Sebastian
- Gentlemen Prefer Blondes (1953) - Hotel Manager
- The Golden Blade (1953) - Barcus
- The Royal African Rifles (1953) - Van Stede
- The French Line (1953) - François, Ship Steward
- The Great Diamond Robbery (1954) - Van Goosen
- Paris Playboys (1954) - Dr. Gaspard
- Knock on Wood (1954) - Dr. Kreuger
- Tobor the Great (1954) - The Foreign Spy-Chief
- New York Confidential (1955) - Morris Franklin
- A Bullet for Joey (1955) - Raphael Garcia
- Daddy Long Legs (1955) - Emile (uncredited)
- To Catch a Thief (1955) - Hotel Desk Clerk (uncredited)
- Kiss of Fire (1955) - Ship Captain Bellon
- Artists and Models (1955) - Kurt's Associate (uncredited)
- The Adventures of Fu Manchu (1956) - Otto Helgaard
- The Birds and the Bees (1956) - Bartender (uncredited)
- Adventures of Superman (1956, TV series, Episode: The Deadly Rock) - Professor Van Wick
- Attack (1956) - Otto - German NCO
- Stagecoach to Fury (1956) - Nichols
- The Gift of Love (1958) - Toy Shop Owner (uncredited)
- A Certain Smile (1958) - Denis
- Verboten! (1959) - Mayor (Burghermeister) of Rothbach
- Count Your Blessings (1959) - Guide
- The Real McCoys (1962, TV Series, Episode: The Diamond Ring) - Mr. Schneider
- Perry Mason (1962, TV Series) - Franz Moray
- Bonanza (1962, TV Series) - Alexander Dubois ("The Dowry")
- Dime with a Halo (1963) - Priest
- The Evil of Frankenstein (1964) - Dr. Sergado (additional sequence: US) (uncredited)
- Wild and Wonderful (1964) - Bartender
- Ship of Fools (1965) - Steward aboard Vera (uncredited)
- Our Man Flint (1966) - Israeli Diplomat (uncredited)
- Jesse James Meets Frankenstein's Daughter (1966) - Dr. Rudolph Frankenstein
- The Swinger (1966) - Man with Fish (final film role)
- The Dick Van Dyke Show (1966, TV Series) - Mr. Gerard ("The Man from My Uncle")
