= List of television spinoffs =

A spinoff in television is a new series containing characters or settings that originated in a previous series, but with a different focus, tone, or theme. For example, the series Frasier was a spinoff of the earlier series Cheers: the character Frasier Crane was introduced as a secondary character on Cheers, and became the protagonist of his own series, set in a different city, in the spinoff. Spinoffs are particularly common in sitcom. A related phenomenon, not to be confused with the spinoff, is the crossover.

Some spinoffs are "engineered" to introduce a new character on the original television series, just so that that character can anchor the new spinoff – that episode of the original series is often known as a "backdoor pilot". For example, the character Avery Ryan appeared in two episodes of the Las Vegas-based CSI: Crime Scene Investigation before the premiere of CSI: Cyber.

A revival, a later remake of a preexisting show, is not a spinoff. This is the case in Doctor Who, where the 2005 series which begins with a new Doctor but maintains the existing continuity. An exception to this rule can be made to series such as The Transformers where the lines of continuity are blurred. If a television pilot was written but never shot, it is not considered a spinoff. When a show undergoes a name change, it is not necessarily a spinoff.

Neither is a reboot series, a term recently invented for motion pictures, which can also occur in television (e.g. The Battlestar Galactica series of 2003 is a reboot, not a spinoff of the 1978 version). This is distinct from a revival in that there is little or no attempt to retain continuity, or casting, with the original. A recent example is the 1987 series Beauty and the Beast, rebooted as the 2012 The CW television series Beauty & the Beast, which keeps only the main premise of a female law enforcement official aided by a man-beast, the New York City locale, and the names of the two main characters. The CW's Beauty & the Beast was later rebooted again as a Max series starting in 2023.

NBC's Law & Order: Special Victims Unit (1999–present), which is the spinoff of NBC's Law & Order (1990–2010; 2022–present), is the longest-running spinoff series in American TV history; its 27th season premiered on September 25, 2025.

The following is an alphabetical list of television spinoffs by their respective parent series.

== # ==
Parent series	Spinoff series	Ref
9-1-1 (2018–present)	9-1-1: Lone Star (2020–2025)	
9-1-1 (2018–present)	9-1-1: Nashville (2025–present)	
19 Kids and Counting (2008–2015)	United Bates of America (2012)	
19 Kids and Counting (2008–2015)	Jill and Jessa: Counting On (2015)	
7 vidas (1999–2006)	Aída (2005–2014)	
77 Sunset Strip (1958–1964)	Bourbon Street Beat (1959–1960)	
16 and Pregnant (2009–2021)	Teen Mom (2009–2021)	
16 and Pregnant (2009–2021)	Teen Mom 2 (2011–2022)	
16 and Pregnant (2009–2021)	Teen Mom 3 (2013)	
60 Minutes (1968–present)	60 Minutes II (1999–2005)	
60 Minutes (1968–present)	60 Minutes+ (2022)	
39 and a Half (2008–2009)	39 and Half Weeks (2019)	
The 20th Century Fox Hour (1955–1957)	Broken Arrow (1956–1958)	
21 Jump Street (1987–1991)	Booker (1989–1990)	
24 (2001–2010, 2014)	24: Legacy (2017)	
No. 73 (1982–1988)	7T3 (1988)	

== A ==
Parent series	Spinoff series
A for Andromeda (1961)	The Andromeda Breakthrough (1962)
The Abbott and Costello Show (1952–1954)	The Abbott and Costello Cartoon Show (1967–1968)
Absolutely (1989–1993)	Mr Don & Mr George (1993)
Adam-12 (1968–1975)	Emergency! (1972–1979)
The Adventures of Batman (1968–1969)	The New Adventures of Batman (1977)
The Adventures of Black Beauty (1972–1974)	The New Adventures of Black Beauty (1990–1992)
The Adventures of Hutch the Honeybee (1979–1971)	New Honeybee Hutch (1974)
The Adventures of Jimmy Neutron, Boy Genius (2002–2006)	Planet Sheen (2010–2013)
The Adventures of Ozzie and Harriet (1952–1966)	Ozzie's Girls (1973–1974)
Al ritmo de la noche (1996-1999)	Cero en conducta (1999–2002)
Al ritmo de la noche (1996-1999)	Humor es...los comediantes (1999–2001)
Al ritmo de la noche (1996-1999)	La escuelita VIP (2003–2004)
ALF (1986–1990)	ALF: The Animated Series (1987–1989)
ALF (1986–1990)	ALF Tales (1988–1989)
ALF (1986–1990)	ALF's Hit Talk Show (2004)
Alice (1976–1985)	Flo (1980–1981)
All American (2018–present)	All American: Homecoming (2022–2024)
All in the Family (1971–1979)	Maude (1972–1978)
All in the Family (1971–1979)	The Jeffersons (1975–1985)
All in the Family (1971–1979)	Archie Bunker's Place (1979–1983)
All in the Family (1971–1979)	Gloria (1982–1983)
All in the Family (1971–1979)	704 Hauser (1994)
The All New Popeye Hour (1978–1982)	Popeye and Son (1987)
All Over the Place (2011–present)	All Over the Workplace (2016–2017)
The All Star Comedy Show (2004)	Monkey Trousers (2005)
All That (1994–2005; 2019–2020)	KaBlam! (1996–2000)
All That (1994–2005; 2019–2020)	Kenan & Kel (1996–2000)
All That (1994–2005; 2019–2020)	The Amanda Show (1999–2002)
All That (1994–2005; 2019–2020)	The Nick Cannon Show (2002–2003)
All That (1994–2005; 2019–2020)	Zoey 101 (2005–2008)
All That (1994–2005; 2019–2020)	Just Jordan (2007–2008)
All the Rivers Run (1983)	All the Rivers Run II (1990)
Ally McBeal (1997–2002)	Ally (1999–2000)
Alphablocks (2011–present)	Numberblocks (2017–present)
The Alvin Show (1961–1962)	Alvin and the Chipmunks (1983–1986)
The Amanda Show (1999–2002)	Moody's Point (2000–2002)
The Amanda Show (1999–2002)	Drake & Josh (2004–2007)
The Amazing Adventures of Morph (1980–1981)	The Morph Files (1996)
Amazing Stories (1985–1987)	Family Dog (1993)
American Chopper (2003–2020)	American Chopper: Senior vs. Junior (2010)
American Chopper (2003–2020)	Orange County Choppers (2013)
America's Funniest Home Videos (1989–present)	America's Funniest People (1990–1994)
America's Funniest Home Videos (1989–present)	America's Funniest Home Videos: Animal Edition (2021–2022)
America's Got Talent (2006–present)	America's Got Talent: The Champions (2019–2020)
American Horror Story (2011–present)	American Horror Stories (2021–2024)
American Idol (2002–2016; 2018–present)	American Juniors (2003)
American Idol (2002–2016; 2018–present)	American Idol Extra (2006–2009)
American Idol (2002–2016; 2018–present)	American Idol Rewind (2006–2010)
American Idol (2002–2016; 2018–present)	Canadian Idol (2003–2008)
Ándale! (1994–1996)	La Güereja... y Algo Más (1998–1999)
Ándale! (1994–1996)	La Güereja de mi Vida (2000–2001)
The Andy Griffith Show (1960–1968)	Gomer Pyle, U.S.M.C. (1964–1969)
The Andy Griffith Show (1960–1968)	Mayberry R.F.D. (1968–1971)
Animaniacs (1993–1998)	Pinky and the Brain (1995–1998)
Anne of Green Gables (1972)	Anne of Avonlea (1975)
Anne of Green Gables (1979)	Kon'nichiwa Anne: Before Green Gables (2009)
Another World (1964–1999)	Somerset (1970–1976)
Another World (1964–1999)	Texas (1980–1982)
Ant & Dec's Saturday Night Takeaway (2002–2024)	In for a Penny (2019–2024)
The Apprentice (2004–2017)	The Apprentice: Martha Stewart (2005)
The Apprentice (2004–2017)	Donald J. Trump Presents The Ultimate Merger (2010)
Aqua Teen Hunger Force (2000–2015)	Soul Quest Overdrive (2011)
The Archie Show (1968–1969)	The Archie Comedy Hour (1969–1970)
The Archie Show (1968–1969)	Archie's Funhouse (1970–1971)
The Archie Show (1968–1969)	Archie's TV Funnies (1971–1973)
The Archie Show (1968–1969)	Everything's Archie (1973–1974)
The Archie Show (1968–1969)	The U.S. of Archie (1974–1976)
The Archie Show (1968–1969)	The New Archie and Sabrina Hour (1977–1978)
The Archie Show (1968–1969)	The New Archies (1987–1988)
The Archie Show (1968–1969)	Archie's Weird Mysteries (1999–2000)
The Archie Comedy Hour (1969–1970)	Sabrina and the Groovie Goolies (1970) (Note: Featuring Sabrina the Teenage Witch (1970) and Groovie Goolies (1970).)
Archie's TV Funnies (1971)	Fabulous Funnies (1978–1979)
Are You Being Served? (1972–1985)	Grace & Favour (1992–1993)
Armchair Theatre (1956–1974)	Armchair Mystery Theatre (1960)
Armchair Theatre (1956–1974)	Out of This World (1962)
Armchair Theatre (1956–1974)	Never Mind the Quality, Feel the Width (1967–1971)
Armchair Theatre (1956–1974)	Callan (1967–1972)
Armchair Theatre (1956–1974)	Armchair Thriller (1967, 1978–1981)
Armchair Theatre (1956–1974)	Armchair 30 (1973)
Armchair Theatre (1956–1974)	Armchair Cinema (1974–1975)
The Army Game (1957–1961)	Bootsie and Snudge (1960–1963)
Around the World with Willy Fog (1984)	Willy Fog 2 (1994–1995)
Arrow (2012–2020)	The Flash (2014–2023)
Arrow (2012–2020)	Legends of Tomorrow (2016–2022)
Arrow (2012–2020)	Batwoman (2019–2022)
Arthur (1996–2022)	Postcards from Buster (2004–2012)
Arthur C. Clarke's Mysterious World (1980)	Arthur C. Clarke's World of Strange Powers (1985)
Arthur C. Clarke's Mysterious World (1980)	Arthur C. Clarke's Mysterious Universe (1994–1995)
ASAP (1995–present)	ASAP Fanatic (2004–2006)
Ashita no Joe (1970–1971)	Ashita no Joe 2 (1980–1981)
As the World Turns (1956–2010)	Our Private World (1965)
Atashin'chi (2002–2009)	Shin Atashin'chi (2015–2016)
The Atom Ant/Secret Squirrel Show (1965–1967)	Super Secret Secret Squirrel (Note: Part of the series 2 Stupid Dogs (1993–1995).) (1993–1995)
The Avengers (1961–1969)	The New Avengers (1976–1977)

== B ==
Parent series	Spinoff series
Babar (1989–1991)	Babar and the Adventures of Badou (2010–2015)
Babel II (1973)	Babel II: Beyond Infinity (2001)
Babylon 5 (1994–1998)	Crusade (1999)
Baddies (2021–present)	Bad Boys (2022–present)
Barbie Dreamhouse Adventures (2018–2020)	Barbie: It Takes Two (2022)
The Bachelor (2002–present)	The Bachelorette (2003–present)
The Bachelor (2002–present)	Bachelor Pad (2010–2012)
The Bachelor (2002–present)	Bachelor in Paradise (2014–present)
The Bachelor (2002–present)	The Bachelor Winter Games (2018)
The Bachelor (2002–present)	The Bachelor Presents: Listen to Your Heart (2020)
The Bachelor (2002–present)	The Golden Bachelor (2023–present)
Bachelor in Paradise (2014–present)	Bachelor in Paradise: After Paradise (2015–2016)
The Bachelorette (2003–present)	The Golden Bachelorette (2024)
Bad Girls Club (2006–2017)	Bad Girls Road Trip (2007)
Bad Girls Club (2006–2017)	Love Games: Bad Girls Need Love Too (2010–2013)
Bad Girls Club (2006–2017)	Bad Girls All-Star Battle (2013–2014)
Bakugan Battle Brawlers (2007–2012)	Baku Tech! Bakugan (2012–2013)
BanG Dream! (2017–2020)	BanG Dream! It's MyGO!!!!! (2023)
BanG Dream! (2017–2020)	BanG Dream! Ave Mujica (2025)
BanG Dream! (2017–2020)	BanG Dream! Yume∞Mita (2026)
Barney Miller (1975–1982)	Fish (1977–1978)
Batman: The Animated Series (1992–1995)	The New Batman/Superman Adventures (1997–2000)
Batman: The Animated Series (1992–1995)	Batman Beyond (1999–2001)
Batman: The Animated Series (1992–1995)	Justice League (2001–2004)
Batman Beyond (1999–2001)	The Zeta Project (2001–2002)
The Batman/Superman Hour (1968–1969)	The Adventures of Batman (1968–1969)
Battlestar Galactica (1978–1979)	Galactica 1980 (1980)
Battlestar Galactica (2004–2009)	Caprica (2010)
Baywatch (1989–2001)	Baywatch Nights (1995–1997)
Beast Wars: Transformers (1996–1999)	Beast Wars II (1998) (Note: Japanese-exclusive series.)
Beast Wars: Transformers (1996–1999)	Beast Wars Neo (1998–1999)
Beast Wars: Transformers (1996–1999)	Beast Machines: Transformers (1999–2000)
Beavis and Butt-Head (1992–1997, 2011)	Daria (1997–2002)
Bear in the Big Blue House (1997–2007)	Breakfast with Bear (2005–2006)
Behind the Music (1997–2014)	BTM2 (2000) (Note: a.k.a. Behind the Music II: Road to Fame or Behind the Music 2.)
The Beiderbecke Affair (1985)	The Beiderbecke Tapes (1987)
The Beiderbecke Affair (1985)	The Beiderbecke Connection (1988)
Being Human (2008–2013)	Becoming Human (2011)
Below Deck (2013–present)	Below Deck Mediterranean (2016–present)
Below Deck (2013–present)	Below Deck Sailing Yacht (2020–present)
Below Deck (2013–present)	Below Deck Down Under (2022–present)
Below Deck (2013–present)	Below Deck Adventure (2022–2023)
Ben 10 (2005–2008)	Ben 10: Alien Force (2008–2010)
Ben 10 (2005–2008)	Ben 10: Ultimate Alien (2010–2012)
Ben 10 (2005–2008)	Ben 10: Omniverse (2012–2014)
Ben Casey (1961–1966)	Breaking Point (1963–1964)
The Best Thing I Ever Ate (2009–2022)	The Best Thing I Ever Made (2011–2013)
Beverly Hills, 90210 (1990–2000)	Melrose Place (1992–1999)
Beverly Hills, 90210 (1990–2000)	Models Inc. (1994–1995)
Beverly Hills, 90210 (1990–2000)	90210 (2008–2013)
Beverly Hills, 90210 (1990–2000)	Melrose Place (2009–2010)
Beverly Hills, 90210 (1990–2000)	BH90210 (2019)
Bewitched (1964–1972)	Tabitha (1976–1978)
Beyblade (2001–2003)	Beyblade: Metal Saga (2009–2012)
Beyblade (2001–2003)	BeyWheelz (2012)
Beyblade (2001–2003)	Beyblade Burst (2017–2023)
Beyblade (2001–2003)	Beyblade X (2023–present)
BeyWheelz (2012)	BeyWarriors: BeyRaiderz (2014)
BeyWheelz (2012)	BeyWarriors: Cyborg (2014–2015)
Bhabiji Ghar Par Hain! (2015–present)	Happu Ki Ultan Paltan (2019–2026)
The Big Bang Theory (2007–2019)	Young Sheldon (2017–2024)
Big Brother (American) (2000–present)	House Calls: The Big Brother Talk Show (2004–2008)
Big Brother (American) (2000–present)	Big Brother: After Dark (2007–2019)
Big Brother (American) (2000–present)	Big Brother: Live Chat (2012–2017)
Big Brother (American) (2000–present)	Big Brother: Over the Top (2016)
Big Brother (American) (2000–present)	Celebrity Big Brother (American) (2018–2019; 2022)
Big Brother (American) (2000–present)	Celebrity Big Brother: After Dark (2018–2019)
Big Brother (American) (2000–present)	Off the Block with Ross and Marissa (2018)
Big Brother (Australia) (2001–2008)	Big Brother VIP (Australian) (2021)
Big Brother (Australia) (2001–2008)	Big Brother Friday Night Live (2005)
Big Brother (British) (2000–2010; 2011–2018; 2023–present)	Celebrity Big Brother (British) (2001–2010; 2011–2018; 2024–present)
Big Brother (Dutch) (1999–2002; 2005–2006)	Big Brother VIPs (2000)
Big Brother (Dutch) (1999–2002; 2005–2006)	Hotel Big Brother (2006)
Big Brother Friday Night Live (2005)	Friday Night Games (2006)
Big Mouth (2017–2025)	Human Resources (2022–2023)
Bikkuriman (1987–1989)	Shin Bikkuriman (1989–1990)
Bikkuriman (1987–1989)	Super Bikkuriman (1992–1993)
Bikkuriman (1987–1989)	Bikkuriman 2000 (1999–2001)
Bikkuriman (1987–1989)	Happy Lucky Bikkuriman (2006–2007)
The Bill (1984–2010)	Burnside (2000)
The Bill (1984–2010)	M.I.T.: Murder Investigation Team (2003–2005)
Birdman and the Galaxy Trio (1967–1968)	Harvey Birdman, Attorney at Law (2000–2007)
Bizarre (1980–1985)	Super Dave (1987–1991)
B. J. and the Bear (1979–1981)	The Misadventures of Sheriff Lobo (1979–1981)
Black Ink Crew (2013–2023)	Black Ink Crew: Chicago (2015–2022)
Black Ink Crew (2013–2023)	Black Ink Crew: Los Angeles (2019–2023)
Black Jack (2004–2006)	Black Jack 21 (2006)
Black-ish (2014–2022)	Grown-ish (2018–2024)
Black-ish (2014–2022)	Mixed-ish (2019–2021)
The Blacklist (2013–2023)	The Blacklist: Redemption (2017)
Blackpool (2004)	Viva Blackpool (2006)
The Blood Sword (1990)	The Blood Sword 2 (1991)
Blue Murder (1995)	Blue Murder: Killer Cop (2017)
Blue's Clues (1996–2006)	Blue's Room (2004–2007)
Bo' Selecta! (2002–2009)	A Bear's Tail (2005)
Bo' Selecta! (2002–2009)	Bo! in the USA (2006)
Bob the Builder (1998–2004)	Bob the Builder: Project: Build It (2005–2008)
Bob the Builder (1998–2004)	Bob the Builder: Ready, Steady, Build! (2010–2011)
Bomberman B-Daman Bakugaiden (1998–1999)	Bomberman B-Daman Bakugaiden V (1999–2000)
Bonanza (1959–1973)	Ponderosa (2001–2002)
Bones (2005–2017)	The Finder (2012)
Bootsie and Snudge (1960-1963)	Foreign Affairs (1964)
Bosch (2014–2021)	Bosch: Legacy (2022–2025)
The Boss Baby: Back in Business (2018–2020)	The Boss Baby: Back in the Crib (2022–2023)
Botched (2014–present)	Botched by Nature (2016)
Bourbon Street Beat (1959–1960)	Surfside 6 (1960–1962)
Boy Meets World (1993–2000)	Girl Meets World (2014–2017)
The Boys (2019–present)	Gen V (2023–present)
Boys Over Flowers (2005)	Boys Over Flowers 2 (2007)
Boys Over Flowers (2005)	Boys Over Flowers Season 2 (2018)
The Brady Bunch (1969–1974)	The Brady Kids (1972–1973)
The Brady Bunch (1969–1974)	The Brady Bunch Hour (1977)
The Brady Bunch (1969–1974)	The Brady Brides (1981)
The Brady Bunch (1969–1974)	The Bradys (1990)
The Brady Kids (1972–1973)	Mission: Magic! (1973)
Brainiac: Science Abuse (2003–2008)	Brainiac: History Abuse (2005–2006)
Brainiac: Science Abuse (2003–2008)	Brainiac's Test Tube Baby (2006–2007)
Breaking Amish (2012–2014)	Return to Amish (2014–2023)
Breaking Bad (2008–2013)	Better Call Saul (2015–2022)
Britain's Got Talent (2007–present)	Britain's Got More Talent (2007–2019; 2020–present)
Britain's Got Talent (2007–present)	Britain's Got Talent: The Champions (2019)
Brookside (1982–2003)	Damon and Debbie (1987)
Brookside (1982–2003)	South (1988)
Bruce Forsyth's Big Night (1978)	The Steve Jones Games Show (1979–1980)
Bruce Forsyth's Big Night (1978)	The Pyramid Game (1981–1984, 1989–1990, 2007)
Bubblegum Crisis Tokyo 2040 (1998–1999)	A.D. Police: To Protect and Serve (1999)
Budgie (1971–1972)	Charles Endell Esq. (1979–1980)
Buffy the Vampire Slayer (1997–2003)	Angel (1999–2004)
The Bugs Bunny Show (1960–2000)	The Porky Pig Show (1964–1967)
The Bugs Bunny Show (1960–2000)	The Road Runner Show (1966–1972)
The Bund (1980)	The Bund II (1980)
The Bund (1980)	The Bund III (1980–1981)
Burke's Law (1963–1965)	Honey West (1965–1966)
Burke's Law (1963–1965)	Amos Burke: Secret Agent (1965–1966)
Burke's Law (1963–1965)	Burke's Law (1994–1995)
Busting Loose (1977)	The Ted Knight Show (1978)

== C ==
Parent series	Spinoff series
Cabaret (1936–1946)	Cabaret Cartoons (1936–1946)
Cabaret (1936–1946)	Cabaret Cruise (1937–1949)
Cabaret (1936–1946)	Comedy Cabaret (1938–1939)
Cabaret (1936–1946)	Eastern Cabaret (1938–1939)
Cabaret (1936–1946)	Intimate Cabaret (1937–1939)
Cabaret (1936–1946)	Western Cabaret (1939)
Cake Boss (2009–2020)	The Next Great Baker (2010–2014)
Cake Boss (2009–2020)	Kitchen Boss (2011–2012)
Cake Boss (2009–2020)	Buddy's Bakery Rescue (2013)
Cake Boss (2009–2020)	Buddy's Family Vacation (2016)
Camberwick Green (1966)	Trumpton (1967)
Camberwick Green (1966)	Chigley (1969)
Canned Carrott (1990–1995)	The Detectives (1993–1997)
Cannon (1971–1976)	Barnaby Jones (1973–1980)
Cardcaptor Sakura (1998–2000)	Cardcaptor Sakura: Clear Card (2018)
Care Bears (1985)	The Care Bears Family (1986–1988)
Care Bears (1985)	Care Bears: Adventures in Care-a-lot (2007–2009)
Care Bears (1985)	Care Bears: Welcome to Care-a-Lot (2012)
Care Bears (1985)	Care Bears: Unlock the Magic (2019–2024)
Care Bears: Welcome to Care-a-Lot (2012)	Care Bears & Cousins (2015–2016)
The Carol Burnett Show (1967–1978)	Mama's Family (1983–1984, 1986–1990)
The Cartoonstitute (Unaired)	Regular Show (2010–2017)
The Cartoonstitute (Unaired)	Secret Mountain Fort Awesome (2011–2013)
Casualty (1986–present)	Holby City (1999–2022)
Casualty (1986–present)	Casualty 1906 (2007)
Casualty (1986–present)	Casualty 1907 (2008)
Casualty (1986–present)	Casualty 1909 (2009)
Captain Planet and the Planeteers (1990–1996)	The New Adventures of Captain Planet (1993–1996)
Captain Tsubasa (1983–1986)
Captain Tsubasa (1983–1986)	Captain Tsubasa J (1994–1995)
Captain Tsubasa (1983–1986)	Captain Tsubasa: Road to 2002 (2001–2002)
Captain Video and His Video Rangers (1949–1955)	The Secret Files of Captain Video (1953–1955)
Captain Video and His Video Rangers (1949–1955)	Captain Video and His Cartoon Rangers (1956–1957)
Cartoon Sushi (1997–1998)	Untalkative Bunny (2001–2003)
Cartoon Sushi (1997–1998)	Celebrity Deathmatch (1998–2002, 2006–2007)
Cavalcade of Stars (1949–1957)	The Honeymooners (1955–1956)
Cavalcade of Stars (1949–1957)	The Jackie Gleason Show (1961)
Cavalcade of Stars (1949–1957)	American Scene Magazine (1962–1970)
Cheers (1982–1993)	The Tortellis (1987)
Cheers (1982–1993)	Frasier (1993–2004)
The Chelsea Handler Show (2006)	Chelsea Lately (2007–2014)
The Chelsea Handler Show (2006)	After Lately (2011–2013)
The Chelsea Handler Show (2006)	Are You There, Chelsea? (2011–2012)
Cheyenne (1955–1963)	Bronco (1958–1962)
Cheyenne (1955–1963)	The Dakotas (1963)
Chicago Fire (2012–present)	Chicago P.D. (2014–present)
Chicago Fire (2012–present)	Chicago Med (2015–present)
Chicago Fire (2012–present)	Chicago Justice (2017)
Childrens Hospital (2008, 2010–2016)	NTSF:SD:SUV:: (2011–2013)
Childrens Hospital (2008, 2010–2016)	Newsreaders (2013–2015)
Childrens Hospital (2008, 2010–2016)	Medical Police (2020)
Chrisley Knows Best (2014–present)	According to Chrisley (2017)
Chrisley Knows Best (2014–present)	What's Cooking with Julie Chrisley (2017)
Chrisley Knows Best (2014–present)	Growing up Chrisley (2019–2022)
CID (1998–2025)	C.I.D. Kolkata Bureau (2012–2014)
Cinematech (2002–2007)	Cinematech: Nocturnal Emissions (2005–2007)
The Clash (2018-present)	The Clash Teens (2026)
Clifford the Big Red Dog (2000–2003)	Clifford's Puppy Days (2003–2006)
The Closer (2005–2012)	Major Crimes (2012–2018)
Code Lyoko (2003–2007)	Code Lyoko: Evolution (2013)
Cold Pizza (2003–2007)	ESPN First Take (2007–present)
La CQ (2012–2014)	La CQ: nuevo ingreso (2024–present)
Columbo (1968–2003)	Mrs. Columbo (1979) (Note: Later retitled Kate Columbo, then Kate the Detective and Kate Loves a Mystery from its second season.)
Come Dancing (1949–1995)	Strictly Come Dancing (2004–present)
Comedy Playhouse (1961–1975; 2014–2017)	Steptoe and Son (1962–1974)
Comedy Playhouse (1961–1975; 2014–2017)	Meet the Wife (1964–1966)
Comedy Playhouse (1961–1975; 2014–2017)	The Walrus and the Carpenter (1965)
Comedy Playhouse (1961–1975; 2014–2017)	The Vital Spark (1965–1974)
Comedy Playhouse (1961–1975; 2014–2017)	Till Death Us Do Part (1966–1975)
Comedy Playhouse (1961–1975; 2014–2017)	All Gas and Gaiters (1966–1971)
Comedy Playhouse (1961–1975; 2014–2017)	Beggar My Neighbour (1967–1968)
Comedy Playhouse (1961–1975; 2014–2017)	Not in Front of the Children (1967–1970)
Comedy Playhouse (1961–1975; 2014–2017)	The Reluctant Romeo (1967)
Comedy Playhouse (1961–1975; 2014–2017)	Room at the Bottom (1967)
Comedy Playhouse (1961–1975; 2014–2017)	The Whitehall Worrier (1967)
Comedy Playhouse (1961–1975; 2014–2017)	B-And-B (1968)
Comedy Playhouse (1961–1975; 2014–2017)	The Old Campaigner (1968–1969)
Comedy Playhouse (1961–1975; 2014–2017)	The Liver Birds (1969–1978, 1996)
Comedy Playhouse (1961–1975; 2014–2017)	Me Mammy (1968–1971)
Comedy Playhouse (1961–1975; 2014–2017)	Thicker Than Water (1969)
Comedy Playhouse (1961–1975; 2014–2017)	Wild, Wild Women (1968–1969)
Comedy Playhouse (1961–1975; 2014–2017)	Up Pompeii! (1969–1971, 1975, 1991)
Comedy Playhouse (1961–1975; 2014–2017)	As Good Cooks Go (1970)
Comedy Playhouse (1961–1975; 2014–2017)	It's Awfully Bad for Your Eyes, Darling (1971)
Comedy Playhouse (1961–1975; 2014–2017)	That's Your Funeral (1971)
Comedy Playhouse (1961–1975; 2014–2017)	Are You Being Served? (1972–1985)
Comedy Playhouse (1961–1975; 2014–2017)	Last of the Summer Wine (1973–2010)
Comedy Playhouse (1961–1975; 2014–2017)	Happy Ever After (1974–1979)
Comedy Playhouse (1961–1975; 2014–2017)	No Strings (1974)
Comedy Playhouse (1961–1975; 2014–2017)	The Rough with the Smooth (1975)
Comedy Playhouse (1961–1975; 2014–2017)	Mr. Big (1977)
Comedy Playhouse (1961–1975; 2014–2017)	Mountain Goats (2015)
Conan the Adventurer (1992–1993)	Conan and the Young Warriors (1994)
Conflict (1956–1957)	Maverick (1957–1962)
Conflict (1956–1957)	77 Sunset Strip (1958–1964)
Coronation Street (1960–present)	Pardon the Expression (1965–66)
Coronation Street (1960–present)	Turn Out the Lights (1967)
Countdown with Keith Olbermann (2003–2012)	The Rachel Maddow Show (2008–present)
Count Duckula (1988–1993)	Victor & Hugo: Bunglers in Crime (1991–1992)
The Cosby Show (1984–1992)	A Different World (1987–1993)
Cow and Chicken (1997–1999)	I Am Weasel (1997–2000)
Craig of the Creek (2018–2025)	Jessica's Big Little World (2023–2024)
Crayon Shin-chan (1992–present)	Crayon Shin-chan Spin-off (2016–2017)
Crayon Shin-chan (1992–present)	Nohara Hiroshi Hirumeshi no Ryūgi (2025)
The Criminal Investigator (1995)	The Criminal Investigator II (1996)
Criminal Minds (2005–2020)	Criminal Minds: Suspect Behavior (2011)
Criminal Minds (2005–2020)	Criminal Minds: Beyond Borders (2016–2017)
The Crocodile Hunter (1997–2004)	Croc Files (1999–2001)
The Crocodile Hunter (1997–2004)	The Crocodile Hunter Diaries (2002–2004)
The Crocodile Hunter (1997–2004)	Bindi the Jungle Girl (2007–2008)
CSI: Crime Scene Investigation (2000–2015)	CSI: Miami (2002–2012)
CSI: Crime Scene Investigation (2000–2015)	CSI: NY (2004–2013)
CSI: Crime Scene Investigation (2000–2015)	CSI: Cyber (2015–2016)
CSI: Crime Scene Investigation (2000–2015)	CSI: Vegas (2021–2024)
Cunk on Britain (2018)	Cunk on Earth (2022)
Cutie Honey (1973–1974)	Cutie Honey Flash (1997–1998)
Cutie Honey (1973–1974)	Cutie Honey Universe (2018)

== D ==
Parent series	Spinoff series
Da Ali G Show (2000–2004)	Ali G in da USAiii (2003–2004)
The Daily Show (1996–present)	The Colbert Report (2005–2014); The Nightly Show with Larry Wilmore (2015); Full Frontal with Samantha Bee (2016–2022); The Opposition with Jordan Klepper (2017–2018)
Dallas (1978–1991)	Knots Landing (1979–1993)
Dallas (1978–1991)	Dallas (2012–2014)
Dance Moms (2011–2019)	Dance Moms: Miami (2012); Abby's Ultimate Dance Competition (2012–2013)
Danger Mouse (1981–1992)	Count Duckula (1988–1993)
Dani's House (2008–2012)	Dani's Castle (2013–2015)
The Danny Thomas Show (1957–1964)	The Andy Griffith Show (1960–1968)
The Danny Thomas Show (1957–1964)	The New Andy Griffith Show (1971)
Daredevil (2015–2018)	The Punisher (2017–2019)
Daredevil (2015–2018)	Daredevil: Born Again (2025–present)
Dawn of the Croods (2015–2017)	The Croods: Family Tree (2021–2023)
Dawson's Creek (1998–2003)	Young Americans (2000)
DC Nation Shorts (2011–2014)	Teen Titans Go! (2013–present)
DC Nation Shorts (2011–2014)	DC Super Hero Girls (2019–2021)
The Day Today (1994)	Knowing Me, Knowing You with Alan Partridge (1994–1995)
The Day Today (1994)	Brass Eye (1997)
Death in Paradise (2011–present)	Beyond Paradise (2023–present)
December Bride (1954–1959)	Pete and Gladys (1960–1962)
Degrassi Junior High (1987–1989)	Degrassi High (1989–1991)
Degrassi Junior High (1987–1989)	Degrassi: The Next Generation (2001–2015)
Degrassi Junior High (1987–1989)	Degrassi: Next Class (2016–2017)
Dennis the Menace (1986–1988)	The All-New Dennis the Menace (1993)
Dennis the Menace and Gnasher (1996–1998)	Dennis the Menace and Gnasher (2009–2013)
Dennis the Menace and Gnasher (1996–1998)	Dennis & Gnasher: Unleashed! (2017–2021)
Dennou Boukenki Webdiver (2001–2002)	Bakuto Sengen Daigunder (2002); Kamiwaza Wanda (2016–2017)
Department S (1969–1970)	Jason King (1971–1972)
Designing Women (1986–1993)	Women of the House (1995)
Dick & Dom in da Bungalow (2002–2006)	Da Dick and Dom Dairies (2009)
Dick & Dom in da Bungalow (2002–2006)	Diddy Movies (2012–2014)
Dick & Dom in da Bungalow (2002–2006)	Diddy TV (2016–2018)
The Dick Powell Show (1961–1963) (Note: a. k. a. The Dick Powell Theater.)	Burke's Law (1963–1965)
Dick Powell's Zane Grey Theatre (1956–1961)	Trackdown (1957–1959)
Dick Powell's Zane Grey Theatre (1956–1961)	The Rifleman (1958–1963)
Dick Powell's Zane Grey Theatre (1956–1961)	Black Saddle (1959–1960)
Dick Powell's Zane Grey Theatre (1956–1961)	Johnny Ringo (1959–1960)
Dick Powell's Zane Grey Theatre (1956–1961)	The Westerner (1960)
Dick Powell's Zane Grey Theatre (1956–1961)	The Dick Powell Show (1961–1963)
Digimon Adventure (1999–2000)	Digimon Adventure 02 (2000–2001)
Digimon Adventure (1999–2000)	Digimon Tamers (2001–2002)
Digimon Adventure (1999–2000)	Digimon Frontier (2002–2003)
Digimon Adventure (1999–2000)	Digimon Data Squad (2006–2007)
Digimon Adventure (1999–2000)	Digimon Fusion (2010–2012)
Digimon Adventure (1999–2000)	Digimon Universe: App Monsters (2016–2017)
Digimon Adventure (1999–2000)	Digimon Ghost Game (2021–2023)
Diff'rent Strokes (1978–1986)	The Facts of Life (1979–1988)
Disney anthology television series (1954–present)	Gun Shy (1983)
Disney anthology television series (1954–present)	Sidekicks (1986–1987)
The Doctors (1969–1971)	Owen M.D. (1971–1973)
Doctor in the House (1969–1970)	Doctor at Large (1971)
Doctor in the House (1969–1970)	Doctor in Charge (1972–1973)
Doctor in the House (1969–1970)	Doctor at Sea (1974)
Doctor in the House (1969–1970)	Doctor on the Go (1975–1977)
Doctor in the House (1969–1970)	Doctor Down Under (1979)
Doctor in the House (1969–1970)	Doctor at the Top (1991)
Doctor Who (1963–1989, 1996, 2005–present)	Torchwood (2006–2011)
Doctor Who (1963–1989, 1996, 2005–present)	The Sarah Jane Adventures (2007–2011)
Doctor Who (1963–1989, 1996, 2005–present)	Class (2016)
Dogtanian and the Three Muskehounds (1981–1982)	The Return of Dogtanian (1989)
Dora the Explorer (2000–2014, 2019)	Go, Diego, Go! (2005–2011)
Dora the Explorer (2000–2014, 2019)	Dora and Friends: Into the City! (2014–2017)
Double Dare (1986–1993; 2018–2019)	Super Sloppy Double Dare (1987); Celebrity Double Dare (1987) (failed pilot); Fox Family Double Dare (1988); Super Special Double Dare (1991); Double Dare 2000 (2000)
DreamWorks Dragons (2012–2018)	DreamWorks Dragons: Rescue Riders (2019–2022)
DreamWorks Dragons (2012–2018)	DreamWorks Dragons: The Nine Realms (2021–2023)
DragonflyTV (2002–2008)	SciGirls (2010–2015, 2018)
Dragon Ball (1986–1989)	Dragon Ball Z (1989–1996)
Dragon Ball Z (1989–1996)	Dragon Ball GT (1996–1997)
Dragon Ball Z (1989–1996)	Dragon Ball Super (2015–2018)
Dramarama (1983–1989)	Dodger, Bonzo and the Rest (1985–1986)
Dramarama (1983–1989)	Children's Ward (1989–2000)
Dragnet (1951–1954, 1967–1970, 1989–1991, 2003–2004)	Adam-12 (1968–1975)
Dragon Tales (1999–2005)	Dragon Land Tales (TBD)
Drawn Together (2004–2007)	Judge Fudge (2007)
DuckTales (1987–1990)	Darkwing Duck (1991–1992)
DuckTales (1987–1990)	Quack Pack (1996)
Duet (1987–1989)	Open House (1989–1990)
The Dukes of Hazzard (1979–1985)	Enos (1980–1981)
The Dukes of Hazzard (1979–1985)	The Dukes (1983–1984)
The Dumping Ground (2013–present)	The Dumping Ground Survival Files (2014)
The Dumping Ground (2013–present)	The Dumping Ground Dish Up (2015)
The Dumping Ground (2013–present)	The Dumping Ground: I'm... (2016–2021)
Dynasty (1981–1989)	The Colbys (1985–1987)

== E ==
Parent series	Spinoff series
EastEnders (1985–present)	Civvy Street (1988)
EastEnders (1985–present)	EastEnders: E20 (2010–2011)
EastEnders (1985–present)	Redwater (2017)
The Electric Company (1971–1977)	The Electric Company (2009–2011)
The Electric Playground (1997)	Judgement Day (2002–2007)
The Ellen DeGeneres Show (2003–2022)	Bethenny (2012–2014)
Emergency Vets (1998–2008)	E-Vet Interns (2007)
Empty Nest (1988–1995)	Nurses (1991–1994)
Encantadia (2005–2006)	Etheria: Ang Ikalimang Kaharian ng Encantadia (2005–2006)
Encantadia (2005–2006)	Encantadia: Pag-ibig Hanggang Wakas (2006)
Encantadia (2005–2006)	Encantadia (2016 TV series) (2016–2017)
Encantadia (2005–2006)	Encantadia Chronicles: Sang'gre (2025–2026)
Escape from Jupiter (1994–1995)	Return to Jupiter (1997)
Essence of Emeril (1994–2007)	Emeril Live (1997–2010)
Every Witch Way (2014–2015)	WITS Academy (2015)
Extreme Makeover (2002–2007)	Extreme Makeover: Home Edition (2003–2012)
Extreme Makeover (2002–2007)	Extreme Makeover: Weight Loss Edition (2011–2015)
Entertainment Tonight (1981–present)	Hard Copy (1989–1999)
Entertainment Tonight (1981–present)	Real TV (1996–2001)
Entertainment Tonight (1981–present)	Maximum Exposure (2000–2002)
Entertainment Tonight (1981–present)	The Insider (2004–2017)

== F ==
Parent series	Spinoff series
Fame (1982–1987)	Fame L.A. (1997–1998)
Fame (1982–1987)	Fame (2003)
Una familia de diez (2007–present)	¿Tú crees? (2022–present)
Family Guy (1999–2003; 2005–present)	The Cleveland Show (2009–2013)
Family Ties (1982–1989)	Day by Day (1988–1989)
Fantasy Island (1977–1984)	Fantasy Island (2021–2023)
The Fast Show (1994–2014)	Grass (2003)
The Fast Show (1994–2014)	Swiss Toni (2003-2004)
The Fast Show (1994–2014)	Ted & Ralph (1998)
The Fast Show (1994–2014)	You Ain't Seen These, Right! (2002)
Fate/stay night (2006)	Fate/Zero (2011–2012)
Fate/stay night (2006)	Fate/kaleid liner Prisma Illya (2013–2016)
Fate/stay night (2006)	Fate/Apocrypha (2017)
Fate/stay night (2006)	Fate/Extra Last Encore (2018)
Fate/stay night (2006)	Lord El-Melloi II's Case Files {Rail Zeppelin} Grace note (2019)
Fate/stay night (2006)	Fate/strange Fake (2024–present)
The F.B.I. (1965–1974)	Today's FBI (1981–1982)
FBI (2018–present)	FBI: Most Wanted (2020–2025)
FBI (2018–present)	FBI: International (2021–2025)
Felix the Cat (1958–1961)	The Twisted Tales of Felix the Cat (1995–1997)
Felix the Cat (1958–1961)	Baby Felix (2000–2001)
Fetch! with Ruff Ruffman (2006–2010)	Ruff Ruffman: Humble Media Genius (webseries) (2014–2017; 2024)
Fetch! with Ruff Ruffman (2006–2010)	The Ruff Ruffman Show (webseries) (2017)
Figure It Out (1997–1999; 2012–2013)	Figure It Out: Family Style (1998–1999)
Figure It Out (1997–1999; 2012–2013)	Figure It Out: Wild Style (1999–2000)
Fimbles (2002–2004)	The Roly Mo Show (2004–2005)
Fist of Fun (1995–1996)	This Morning with Richard Not Judy (1998–1999)
Fist of the North Star (1986–1987)	Fist of the North Star 2 (1987–1988)
Five Children and It (1991)	The Return of the Psammead (1993)
Flavor of Love (2005–2006, 2008)	Flavor of Love 2 (2006)
Flavor of Love (2005–2006, 2008)	I Love New York (2007–2008)
Flavor of Love (2005–2006, 2008)	Rock of Love with Bret Michaels (2007–2009)
Flavor of Love (2005–2006, 2008)	Real Chance of Love (2009)
Flavor of Love (2005–2006, 2008)	Real and Chance: The Legend Hunters (2010)
Flavor of Love (2005–2006, 2008)	I Love Money (2008)
The Flintstones (1960–1966)	The Pebbles and Bamm-Bamm Show (1971–1972)
The Flintstones (1960–1966)	The Flintstone Comedy Hour (1972–1973)
The Flintstones (1960–1966)	Fred Flintstone and Friends (1977–1978)
The Flintstones (1960–1966)	The New Fred and Barney Show (1979–1980)
The Flintstones (1960–1966)	The Flintstone Comedy Show (1980–1981)
The Flintstones (1960–1966)	The Flintstone Kids (1986–1988)
The Flintstones (1960–1966)	Cave Kids (1996)
The Flintstones (1960–1966)	Yabba-Dabba Dinosaurs (2020–2022)
Flipper (1964–1967)	Flipper – The New Adventures (1995–2000)
The Fonz and the Happy Days Gang (1980–1981)	Mork & Mindy/Laverne & Shirley/Fonz Hour (1982–1983)
The Fosters (2013–2018)	Good Trouble (2019–2024)
Four Star Playhouse (1952–1956)	Meet McGraw (1957–1958)
Four Star Playhouse (1952–1956)	Dante (1960–1961)
Fraggle Rock (1983–1987)	Fraggle Rock: The Animated Series (1987)
Fraggle Rock (1983–1987)	The Doozers (2014–2018)
Fraggle Rock (1983–1987)	Fraggle Rock: Rock On! (2020)
Fraggle Rock (1983–1987)	Fraggle Rock: Back to the Rock (2022–present)
Frank Herbert's Dune (2000)	Frank Herbert's Children of Dune (2003)
Fresh Fields (1984–1986)	French Fields (1989–1991)
Friends (1994–2004)	Joey (2004–2006)
Full House (1987–1995)	Fuller House (2016–2020)
Fun House (1988–1991)	College Mad House (1989–1991)
Further Adventures of Lucky Jim (1967)	The Further Adventures of Lucky Jim (1982)
Futari wa Pretty Cure (2004–2005)	Futari wa Pretty Cure Max Heart (2005–2006)
Future Boy Conan (1978)	Future Boy Conan II: Taiga Adventure (1999–2000)

== G ==
Parent series	Spinoff series
Gabriel's Fire (1990–1991)	Pros and Cons (1991–1992)
Galaxy Cyclone Braiger (1981–1982)	Galactic Gale Baxingar (1982–1983)
Galaxy Cyclone Braiger (1981–1982)	Galactic Whirlwind Sasuraiger (1983–1984)
Galaxy Express 999 (1978–1981)	Space Symphony Maetel (2004)
Gazette (1968)	Hadleigh (1969–1976)
Gensomaden Saiyuki (2000–2001)	Saiyuki Reload (2003–2004)
General Hospital (1963–present)	Port Charles (1997–2003)
General Hospital (1963–present)	General Hospital: Night Shift (2007–2008)
The Genie Family (1969–1970)	Genie Family 2020 (2020)
Genshiken (2004)	Kujibiki Unbalance (2006)
The Gentle Touch (1980–1984)	C.A.T.S. Eyes (1985–1987)
George Burns Comedy Week (1985)	Leo & Liz in Beverly Hills (1986)
George Washington (1984)	George Washington II: The Forging of a Nation (1986)
The Gerald McBoing-Boing Show (1956–1957)	Gerald McBoing-Boing (2005–2007)
Getter Robo (1974–1975)	Getter Robo G (1975–1976)
Getter Robo (1974–1975)	Getter Robo Go (1991–1992)
Getter Robo (1974–1975)	Getter Robo Arc (2021)
Ghost Adventures (2008–present)	Ghost Adventures: Aftershocks (2014–2016)
The Ghost Busters (1975–1976)	Filmation's Ghostbusters (1986–1987)
Ghost Hunters (2004–2023)	Ghost Hunters Academy (2009–2010)
Ghost Hunters (2004–2023)	Ghost Hunters International (2008–2012)
Ghost Train (1989–1991)	Gimme 5 (1992–1994)
G.I. Joe: A Real American Hero (1983–1986)	G.I. Joe: A Real American Hero (1989–1991)
G.I. Joe: A Real American Hero (1983–1986)	G.I. Joe Extreme (1995–1997)
G.I. Joe: A Real American Hero (1983–1986)	G.I. Joe: Sigma 6 (2005–2006)
Gidget (1965–1966)	The New Gidget (1986–1988)
Gilligan's Island (1964–1967)	The New Adventures of Gilligan (1974–1977)
Gilmore Girls (2000–2007)	Gilmore Girls: A Year in the Life (2016)
The Girl from Tomorrow (1991–1993)	The Girl from Tomorrow Part II: Tomorrow's End (1993)
Girlfriends (2000–2008)	The Game (2006–2009; 2011)
The Girls Next Door (2005–2010)	Bridget's Sexiest Beaches (2009)
The Girls Next Door (2005–2010)	Kendra (2009–2011)
The Girls Next Door (2005–2010)	Kendra on Top (2012)
The Girls Next Door (2005–2010)	Holly's World (2009–2011)
Gladiators (1992–2000)	Gladiators: Train 2 Win (1995–1998)
Glee (2009–2015)	The Glee Project (2011–2012)
Goin' Bananas (1986–1991)	Goin' Bulilit (2005-2019)
Goin' Bananas (1986–1991)	Banana Split/Banana Sundae (2008-2020)
Gold Rush (2010–present)	Gold Rush: White Water (2018–2025)
Gold Rush (2010–present)	Gold Rush: Dave Turin's Lost Mine (2019–2022)
Gold Rush (2010–present)	Gold Rush: Mine Rescue with Freddy & Juan (2021–present)
The Goldbergs (2013–2023)	Schooled (2019–2020)
The Golden Girls (1985–1992)	Empty Nest (1988–1995)
The Golden Girls (1985–1992)	The Golden Palace (1992–1993)
Gone Country (2008–2009)	Outsiders Inn (2008)
The Good Night Show (2005–2017)	Nina's World (2015–present)
The Good Place (2016–2020)	The Selection (2019)
The Good Wife (2009–2016)	The Good Fight (2017–2022)
The Good Wife (2009–2016)	Elsbeth (2024–present)
Gossip Girl (2007–2012)	Gossip Girl (2021–2023)
Gran Reserva (2010–2013)	Gran Reserva. El origen (2013)
Grand Designs Australia (2024–present)	Grand Designs Transformations (2024–present)
Grander Musashi (1997)	Grander Musashi RV (1998)
Grandpas Over Flowers (2013–2018)	Sisters Over Flowers (2013–2014)
Grandpas Over Flowers (2013–2018)	Youth Over Flowers (2014–2018)
Grange Hill (1978–2008)	Tucker's Luck (1983–1985)
The Great British Bake Off (2010–present)	Junior Bake Off (2011–present)
The Great British Bake Off (2010–present)	The Great British Sewing Bee (2013–present)
The Great British Bake Off (2010–present)	The Great British Bake Off: An Extra Slice (2014–present)
The Great British Bake Off (2010–present)	The Great Pottery Throw Down (2015–present)
The Great British Bake Off (2010–present)	Bake Off: Crème de la Crème (2016–present)
The Great British Bake Off (2010–present)	Bake Off: The Professionals (2016–present)
Grey's Anatomy (2005–present)	Private Practice (2007–2013)
Grey's Anatomy (2005–present)	Station 19 (2018–2024)
Grim & Evil (2001–2003)	The Grim Adventures of Billy & Mandy (2003–2008)
Grim & Evil (2001–2003)	Evil Con Carne (2003–2004)
Growing Pains (1985–1992)	Just the Ten of Us (1988–1990)
Gundam Build Fighters (2013–2014)	Gundam Build Fighters Try (2014–2015)
Gunsmoke (1955–1975)	Dirty Sally (1974)
Guy Code (2011)	Girl Code (2013)
Guy Code (2011)	Guy Court (2013)

== H ==
Parent series	Spinoff series
H_{2}O: Just Add Water (2006–2010)	Mako: Island of Secrets (2013–2016)
H_{2}O: Just Add Water (2006–2010)	H_{2}O: Mermaid Adventures (2015)
Hafenpolizei (1963–1966)	Polizeifunk ruft (1966–1970)
Hafenpolizei (1963–1966)	Hamburg Transit (1970–1974)
Hancock's Half Hour (1954–1961)	Hancock (1961)
Hancock's Half Hour (1954–1961)	Citizen James (1960–1962)
Happy Days (1974–1984)	Laverne & Shirley (1976–1983)
Happy Days (1974–1984)	Blansky's Beauties (1977)
Happy Days (1974–1984)	Mork & Mindy (1978–1982)
Happy Days (1974–1984)	Out of the Blue (1979)
Happy Days (1974–1984)	The Fonz and the Happy Days Gang (1980–1981)
Happy Days (1974–1984)	Joanie Loves Chachi (1982–1983)
Hazbin Hotel (2024-present)	Helluva Boss (2020-present)
Hardcore Pawn (2010–2015)	Hardcore Pawn: Chicago (2013)
Hark at Barker (1969–1970)	His Lordship Entertains (1972)
Harlem Globetrotters (1970–1971)	The Super Globetrotters (1979)
The Harp in the South (1986)	Poor Man's Orange (1987)
Harley Quinn (2019–present)	Kite Man: Hell Yeah! (2024)
Harvey Birdman, Attorney at Law (2000–2007)	Birdgirl (2021–2022)
Hawkeye (2021)	Echo (2024)
He-Man and the Masters of the Universe (1983–1985)	She-Ra: Princess of Power (1985–1987)
He-Man and the Masters of the Universe (1983–1985)	The New Adventures of He-Man (1990)
He-Man and the Masters of the Universe (1983–1985)	Masters of the Universe (2021–2024)
Head of the Class (1986–1991)	Billy (1992)
Heartbeat (1992–2010)	The Royal (2003–2011)
Hee Haw (1969–1993)	Hee Haw Honeys (1979)
Henry Danger (2014–2020)	The Adventures of Kid Danger (2018)
Henry Danger (2014–2020)	Danger Force (2020–2024)
The Herbs (1968)	The Adventures of Parsley (1970–1971)
The Herculoids (1967–1968)	Space Stars (1981)
Hercules: The Legendary Journeys (1995–1999)	Xena: Warrior Princess (1995–2001)
Hercules: The Legendary Journeys (1995–1999)	Young Hercules (1998–1999)
The Heroes (1989)	Heroes II: The Return (1991)
Heroes (2006–2010)	Heroes Reborn (2015)
Hey Dad..! (1987–1994)	Hampton Court (1991)
Hi-5 (Australian) (1999–2011; 2017)	Hi-5 House (2013–2016)
Highlander: The Series (1992–1998)	Highlander: The Animated Series (1994–1996)
Highlander: The Series (1992–1998)	Highlander: The Raven (1998–1999)
Hill Street Blues (1981–1987)	Beverly Hills Buntz (1987–1988)
The Hills (2006–2010)	The City (2008–2010)
The Hills (2006–2010)	Audrina (2011)
The Hills (2006–2010)	The Hills: New Beginnings (2019–2021)
Holby City (1999–2022)	Casualty@Holby City (2004–2005)
Holby City (1999–2022)	HolbyBlue (2007–2008)
Holiday Baking Championship (2014–present)	Halloween Baking Championship (2015–present)
Hollyoaks (1995–present)	Hollyoaks: Let Loose (2005)
Hollyoaks (1995–present)	Hollyoaks: In the City (2006)
Hollyoaks (1995–present)	Hollyoaks Later (2008–2013)
Hollywood Squares (1968, 1971–1981)	Match Game-Hollywood Squares Hour (1983–1984)
Home Along Da Riles (1992–2003)	Home Along da Airport (2003–2005)
Home Improvement (1991–1999)	Buddies (1996)
Horrible Histories (2009–2014)	Horrible Histories: Gory Games (2011–2018)
Hot in Cleveland (2010–2015)	The Soul Man (2012–2016)
How (1966–1981)	How 2 (1990–2006)
How I Met Your Mother (2005–2014)	How I Met Your Father (2022–2023)
The Huckleberry Hound Show (1958–1962)	The Yogi Bear Show (1961–1962)
The Huckleberry Hound Show (1958–1962)	Laff-A-Lympics (1977–1978) (Note: Shared with Scooby-Doo, Where Are You! (1969–1970).)
The Huckleberry Hound Show (1958–1962)	Jellystone! (2021–present)
Hugh and I (1962–1967)	Hugh and I Spy (1968)
Huo Yuanjia (2001)	Jingwu Yingxiong Chen Zhen (2001)
Huo Yuanjia (2008)	Legend of the Fist: Chen Zhen (2008)

== I ==
Parent series	Spinoff series
iCarly (2007–2012)	Sam & Cat (2013–2014)
I Love Lucy (1951–1957)	The Lucy–Desi Comedy Hour (1957–1960)
I Love the '70s (British) (2000)	I Love the '80s (British) (2001)
I Love the '70s (British) (2000)	I Love the '90s (British) (2001)
I Love the '80s (American) (2002)	I Love the '70s (American) (2003)
I Love the '80s (American) (2002)	I Love the '80s Strikes Back (2003)
I Love the '80s (American) (2002)	I Love the '90s (American) (2004)
I Love the '80s (American) (2002)	Best Week Ever (2004–2009, 2013–2014)
I Love the '80s (American) (2002)	I Love the '90s: Part Deux (2004)
I Love the '80s (American) (2002)	I Love the '80s 3-D (2005)
I Love the '80s (American) (2002)	I Love the Holidays (2005)
I Love the '80s (American) (2002)	I Love Toys (2006)
I Love the '80s (American) (2002)	I Love the '70s: Volume 2 (2006)
I Love the '80s (American) (2002)	I Love the New Millennium (2008)
I Love the '80s (American) (2002)	I Love the 2000s (2014)
The Idiot Weekly, Price 2d (1956)	A Show Called Fred (1956)
The Idiot Weekly, Price 2d (1956)	Son of Fred (1956)
In Living Color (1990–1994)	The Wayans Bros. (1995–1999)
In Living Color (1990–1994)	The Keenen Ivory Wayans Show (1997–1998)
In Living Color (1990–1994)	Damon (1998)
Inspector Gadget (1983–1986)	Gadget Boy & Heather (1995–1997) (Note: Retitled Gadget Boy's Adventures in History from its second season.)
Inspector Gadget (1983–1986)	Inspector Gadget's Field Trip (1996–1997)
Inspector Gadget (1983–1986)	Gadget & the Gadgetinis (2002–2003)
Inspector Gadget (1983–1986)	Inspector Gadget (2015–2018)
Inspector Morse (1987–2000)	Lewis (2006–2015)
Inspector Morse (1987–2000)	Endeavour (2012–2023)
Inspector Rex (1994)	Stockinger (1996–1997)
The Interpretaris (1966)	Vega 4 (1968)
The Interpretaris (1966)	Phoenix Five (1970)
Initial D: First Stage (1998)	Initial D: Second Stage (1999–2000)
Initial D: First Stage (1998)	Initial D: Fourth Stage (2004–2006)
Initial D: First Stage (1998)	Initial D: Fifth Stage (2012–2013)
Initial D: First Stage (1998)	Initial D: Final Stage (2014)
Iris (2009)	Athena: Goddess of War (2010–2011)
Iris (2009)	Iris II: New Generation (2013)
Iron Chef (1993–2001)	Iron Chef USA (2001)
Iron Chef (1993–2001)	Iron Chef America (2005)
Iron Chef (1993–2001)	The Next Iron Chef (2007–2010)
Ironside (1967–1975)	Amy Prentiss (1974–1975)
Ishqbaaaz (2016–2019)	Dil Boley Oberoi (2017)
Inside Edition (1989)	Instant Recall (1990–1992)
Inside Edition (1989)	American Journal (1993–1998)
It's Alive! (1993–1997)	Uh Oh! (1997–2003)

== J ==
Parent series	Spinoff series
Jackass (2000–2001)	Viva La Bam (2003–2005)
Jackass (2000–2001)	Wildboyz (2003–2006)
Jackass (2000–2001)	Homewrecker (2005)
The Jackie Gleason Show (1949–1957)	The Honeymooners (1955–1956)
JAG (1995–2005)	NCIS (2003–present)
The Janice Dickinson Modeling Agency (2006–2008)	Christmas with the Dickinsons (2006)
The Janice Dickinson Modeling Agency (2006–2008)	Janice & Abbey (2007)
The Jeffersons (1975–1985)	Checking In (1981)
The Jerry Springer Show (1991–2018)	The Steve Wilkos Show (2007–present)
Jersey Shore (2009–2012)	The Pauly D Project (2012)
Jersey Shore (2009–2012)	Snooki & Jwoww (2012–2015)
Jersey Shore (2009–2012)	The Show with Vinny (2013)
Jersey Shore (2009–2012)	Floribama Shore (2017–2021)
Jersey Shore (2009–2012)	Jersey Shore: Family Vacation (2018–present)
Jersey Shore (2009–2012)	Buckhead Shore (2012)
Jerseylicious (2010–2017)	Glam Fairy (2011–2012)
Jessie (2011–2015)	Bunk'd (2015–2024)
The Jim Henson Hour (1989–1993)	Dog City (1992–1994)
Jon & Kate Plus 8 (2007–2009)	Kate Plus 8 (2010–2017)
Jonny Quest (1964–1965)	The New Adventures of Jonny Quest (1986–1987)
Jonny Quest (1964–1965)	The Real Adventures of Jonny Quest (1996–1997)
Journey to the West (1996)	Journey to the West II (1998)
Judge Judy (1996–2021)	Judy Justice (2021–present)
Jurassic World Camp Cretaceous (2020–2022)	Jurassic World: Chaos Theory (2024–2025)
Justice Pao (1993–1994)	The Seven Heroes and Five Gallants (1994)
Justice Pao (1993–1994)	Return of Judge Bao (2000)
Justice League (2001–2004)	Justice League Unlimited (2004–2006)
Juukou B-Fighter (1995–1996)	B-Fighter Kabuto (1996–1997)

== K ==
Parent series	Spinoff series
KaBlam! (1996–2000)	Action League Now! (1995–2002)
KaBlam! (1996–2000)	Angela Anaconda (1999–2001)
Kamen Rider (1971–1973)	Kamen Rider V3 (1973–1974)
Kamen Rider (1971–1973)	Kamen Rider X (1974)
Kamen Rider (1971–1973)	Kamen Rider Amazon (1974–1975)
Kamen Rider (1971–1973)	Kamen Rider Stronger (1975)
Kamen Rider (1971–1973)	Kamen Rider Skyrider (1979–1980)
Kamen Rider (1971–1973)	Kamen Rider Super-1 (1980–1981)
Kamen Rider (1971–1973)	Kamen Rider Black (1987–1988)
Kamen Rider (1971–1973)	Kamen Rider Kuuga (2000–2001)
Kamen Rider (1971–1973)	Kamen Rider Agito (2001–2002)
Kamen Rider (1971–1973)	Kamen Rider Ryuki (2002–2003)
Kamen Rider (1971–1973)	Kamen Rider 555 (2003–2004)
Kamen Rider (1971–1973)	Kamen Rider Blade (2004–2005)
Kamen Rider (1971–1973)	Kamen Rider Hibiki (2005–2006)
Kamen Rider (1971–1973)	Kamen Rider Kabuto (2006–2007)
Kamen Rider (1971–1973)	Kamen Rider Den-O (2007–2008)
Kamen Rider (1971–1973)	Kamen Rider Kiva (2008–2009)
Kamen Rider (1971–1973)	Kamen Rider Decade (2009)
Kamen Rider (1971–1973)	Kamen Rider W (2009–2010)
Kamen Rider (1971–1973)	Kamen Rider OOO (2010–2011)
Kamen Rider (1971–1973)	Kamen Rider Fourze (2011–2012)
Kamen Rider (1971–1973)	Kamen Rider Wizard (2012–2013)
Kamen Rider (1971–1973)	Kamen Rider Gaim (2013–2014)
Kamen Rider (1971–1973)	Kamen Rider Drive (2014–2015)
Kamen Rider (1971–1973)	Kamen Rider Ghost (2015–2016)
Kamen Rider (1971–1973)	Kamen Rider Ex-Aid (2016–2017)
Kamen Rider (1971–1973)	Kamen Rider Build (2017–2018)
Kamen Rider (1971–1973)	Kamen Rider Zi-O (2018–2019)
Kamen Rider (1971–1973)	Kamen Rider Zero-One (2019–2020)
Kamen Rider (1971–1973)	Kamen Rider Saber (2020–2021)
Kamen Rider (1971–1973)	Kamen Rider Revice (2021–2022)
Kamen Rider (1971–1973)	Kamen Rider Geats (2022–2023)
Kamen Rider (1971–1973)	Kamen Rider Gotchard (2023–2024)
Kamen Rider (1971–1973)	Kamen Rider Gavv (2024–2025)
Kamen Rider Black (1987–1988)	Kamen Rider Black RX (1988–1989)
Kamisama Minarai: Himitsu no Cocotama (2015–2018)	Kira Kira Happy Hirake! Cocotama (2018–2019)
Karol: A Man Who Became Pope (2005)	Karol: The Pope, The Man (2006)
Keeping Up Appearances (1990–1995)	Young Hyacinth (2016)
Keyshia & Daniel: Family First (2012)	Keyshia Cole: All In (2015)
The Kindaichi Case Files (1997–2000)	The Kindaichi Case Files R (2014–2016)
Kendra (2009–2011)	Kendra on Top (2012)
The Kids of Degrassi Street (1979–1986)	Degrassi Junior High (1987–1989)
The Kids of Degrassi Street (1979–1986)	Degrassi Talks (1992)
Kim Kardashian Superstar (2007)	Keeping Up with the Kardashians (2007–2021)
Kim Kardashian Superstar (2007)	Kourtney and Khloé Take Miami (2009)
Kim Kardashian Superstar (2007)	The Spin Crowd (2009)
Kim Kardashian Superstar (2007)	Kourtney and Kim Take New York (2010)
Kim Kardashian Superstar (2007)	Khloé & Lamar (2011)
Kim Kardashian Superstar (2007)	Kourtney and Khloé Take The Hamptons (2014)
Kim Kardashian Superstar (2007)	I Am Cait (2015)
Kim Kardashian Superstar (2007)	Dash Dolls (2015)
Kim Kardashian Superstar (2007)	Rob & Chyna (2016)
Kim Kardashian Superstar (2007)	Life of Kylie (2017)
Kim Kardashian Superstar (2007)	The Kardashians (2022–present)
Kimba the White Lion (1965–1966)	Leo the Lion (1966–1967)
King Arthur (1979–1980)	King Arthur: Prince on White Horse (1980)
Kinnikuman (1983–1986)	Tatakae!! Ramenman (1988)
Kinnikuman (1983–1986)	Kinnikuman: Scramble for the Throne (1991–1992)
Kinnikuman (1983–1986)	Ultimate Muscle: The Kinnikuman Legacy (2002–2006)
Knight Rider (1982–1986)	Code of Vengeance (1985–1986)
Knight Rider (1982–1986)	Team Knight Rider (1997–1998)
Knight Rider (1982–1986)	Knight Rider (2008–2009)
Knowing Me, Knowing You with Alan Partridge (1994–1995)	I'm Alan Partridge (1997–2002)
Knowing Me, Knowing You with Alan Partridge (1994–1995)	Anglian Lives: Alan Partridge (2003)
Knowing Me, Knowing You with Alan Partridge (1994–1995)	Mid Morning Matters with Alan Partridge (2010-2016)
Knowing Me, Knowing You with Alan Partridge (1994–1995)	Alan Partridge: Welcome to the Places of My Life (2012)
Knowing Me, Knowing You with Alan Partridge (1994–1995)	This Time with Alan Partridge (2019–2021)
Kokey (2007)	Kokey at Ako (2010)
KonoSuba (2016–present)	KonoSuba: An Explosion on This Wonderful World! (2023)
Kratts' Creatures (1996)	Zoboomafoo (1999–2001)
Kratts' Creatures (1996)	Be the Creature (2003–2004)
Kratts' Creatures (1996)	Wild Kratts (2011–present)
Kung Fu (1972–1975)	Kung Fu: The Legend Continues (1993–1997)
Kung Fu Panda: Legends of Awesomeness (2011–2016)	Kung Fu Panda: The Paws of Destiny (2018–2019)
Kung Fu Panda: Legends of Awesomeness (2011–2016)	Kung Fu Panda: The Dragon Knight (2022–2023)
Kumkum Bhagya (2014–2025)	Kundali Bhagya (2017–2024)

== L ==
Parent series	Spinoff series
The L Word (2004–2009)	The L Word: Generation Q (2019–2023)
Lab Rats (2012–2016)	Lab Rats: Elite Force (2016)
Lace (1983)	Lace II (1985)
Laguna Beach: The Real Orange County (2004–2006)	The Hills (2006–2010)
Laguna Beach: The Real Orange County (2004–2006)	Newport Harbor: The Real Orange County (2007–2008)
Lassie (1954–1973)	Lassie's Rescue Rangers (1973)
Lassie (1954–1973)	The New Lassie (1989–1992)
The Last Don (1997)	The Last Don II (1998)
The Last of the Mohicans (1971)	Hawkeye, the Pathfinder (1973)
Last of the Summer Wine (1973–2010)	First of the Summer Wine (1988–1989)
Late Night Line Up (1964–1972)	Colour Me Pop (1968–1969)
The Laughing Salesman (1989–1992)	The Laughing Salesman NEW (2017)
Laverne & Shirley (1976–1983)	Laverne & Shirley (1981–1982)
Laverne & Shirley (1981–1982)	Mork & Mindy/Laverne & Shirley/Fonz Hour (1982–1983)
Law & Order (1990–2010, 2022–present)	Law & Order: Special Victims Unit (1999–present)
Law & Order (1990–2010, 2022–present)	Law & Order: Criminal Intent (2001–2011)
Law & Order (1990–2010, 2022–present)	Law & Order: Trial by Jury (2005–2006)
Law & Order (1990–2010, 2022–present)	Conviction (2006)
Law & Order (1990–2010, 2022–present)	Law & Order: LA (2010–2011)
Law & Order (1990–2010, 2022–present)	Law & Order: True Crime (2017)
Law & Order (1990–2010, 2022–present)	Law & Order: Organized Crime (2021–2025)
Leave It to Beaver (1957–1963)	The New Leave It to Beaver (1983–1989)
The Legend and the Hero (2007)	The Legend and the Hero 2 (2009)
The Legend of the Condor Heroes (1976)	The Return of the Condor Heroes (1976)
The Legend of the Condor Heroes (1976)	The Heaven Sword and Dragon Saber (1978)
The Legend of the Condor Heroes (1983)	The Return of the Condor Heroes (1983–1984)
The Legend of the Condor Heroes (1983)	New Heavenly Sword and Dragon Sabre (1986)
The Legend of the Condor Heroes (1994)	The Condor Heroes 95 (1995)
The Legendary Siblings (1999)	The Legendary Siblings 2 (2002)
Lego Star Wars: The Freemaker Adventures (2016–2017)	Lego Star Wars: All-Stars (2018)
Lego Star Wars: The Yoda Chronicles (2013–2014) (Note: Retitled Lego Star Wars: The New Yoda Chronicles from its second season.)	Lego Star Wars: Droid Tales (2015)
Lego Star Wars: The Yoda Chronicles (2013–2014)	Lego Star Wars: The Resistance Rises (2016)
Lego Star Wars: The Yoda Chronicles (2013–2014)	Lego Star Wars: The Freemaker Adventures (2016–2017)
Lego Star Wars: The Yoda Chronicles (2013–2014)	Lego Star Wars: Rebuild the Galaxy (2024–2025) (Note: Retitled Lego Star Wars: Rebuild the Galaxy: Pieces of the Past from its second season.)
Life on Mars (2006–2007)	Ashes to Ashes (2008–2010)
The Likely Lads (1964–1966)	Whatever Happened to the Likely Lads? (1973–1974)
Liquid Television (1991–1995)	Beavis and Butt-Head (1993–1997, 2011)
Liquid Television (1991–1995)	Æon Flux (1991–1995)
Liquid Television (1991–1995)	Cartoon Sushi (1997–1998)
Little Britain (2003–2006)	Little Britain USA (2008)
The Little Mermaid (1992–1994)	Sebastian (Note: Part of the series Marsupilami (1993).) (1993)
Locked Up (2015–2019)	Locked Up: the Oasis (2020)
Lonesome Dove (1989)	Return to Lonesome Dove (1993)
Lonesome Dove (1989)	Lonesome Dove: The Series (1994–1996)
Lonesome Dove (1989)	Streets of Laredo (1995)
Lonesome Dove (1989)	Dead Man's Walk (1996)
Lonesome Dove (1989)	Comanche Moon (1996)
The Loud House (2016–present)	The Casagrandes (2019–2022)
The Loud House (2016–present)	The Really Loud House (2022–2024)
Love, American Style (1969–1974)	Barefoot in the Park (1970)
Love, American Style (1969–1974)	Wait Till Your Father Gets Home (1972–1974)
Love, American Style (1969–1974)	Happy Days (1974–1984)
The Love Boat (1976–1986)	Love Boat: The Next Wave (1998–1999)
Love Live! School Idol Project (2013–2014)	Love Live! Sunshine!! (2016–2017)
Love Live! School Idol Project (2013–2014)	Love Live! Nijigasaki High School Idol Club (2020–2022)
Love Live! School Idol Project (2013–2014)	Love Live! Superstar!! (2021–2024)
Love Live! Superstar!! (2021–2024)	Yohane the Parhelion: Sunshine in the Mirror (2023)
Loving (1983–1995)	The City (1995–1997)
The Lick with Trevor Nelson (1998)	Trevor Meets... (1999)
Lunch Date (1986–1993)	SST: Salo-Salo Together (1993–1995)
Lunch Date (1986–1993)	Katok Mga Misis (1995-1996)
Lupin the 3rd Part I (1971–1972)	Lupin the 3rd Part II (1977–1980)
Lupin the 3rd Part I (1971–1972)	Lupin the 3rd Part III (1984–1985)
Lupin the 3rd Part I (1971–1972)	Lupin the Third: The Woman Called Fujiko Mine (2012)
Lupin the 3rd Part I (1971–1972)	Lupin the 3rd Part IV: The Italian Adventure (2015)
Lupin the 3rd Part I (1971–1972)	Lupin the 3rd Part 5 (2018)
Lupin the 3rd Part I (1971–1972)	Lupin the 3rd Part 6 (2021–2022)

== M ==
Parent series	Spinoff series
Machine Robo: Revenge of Cronos (1986–1987)	Machine Robo: Battle Hackers (1987)
Mad TV (1995–2009)	MAD (2010–2013)
Magi: The Labyrinth of Magic (2012–2014)	Magi: Adventure of Sinbad (2016)
The Magic School Bus (1994–1997)	The Magic School Bus Rides Again (2017–2021)
Magical Girl Lyrical Nanoha (2004–2007)	Magical Girl Lyrical Nanoha ViVid (2015)
Magical Girl Lyrical Nanoha ViVid (2015)	ViVid Strike! (2016)
Magical Princess Minky Momo (1982–1983)	Magical Princess Minky Momo: Hold on to Your Dreams (1991–1992)
The Magnificent Six and 1/2 (1968–1970)	Here Come the Double Deckers (1970–1971)
Make Room for Daddy (1953–1955)	The Danny Thomas Show (1957–1964)
Make Room for Daddy (1953–1955)	The Joey Bishop Show (1961–1965)
Make Room for Daddy (1953–1955)	The Bill Dana Show (1963–1965)
Make Room for Daddy (1953–1955)	Make Room for Granddaddy (1970–1971)
Man About the House (1973–1976)	George and Mildred (1976–1979)
Man About the House (1973–1976)	Robin's Nest (1977–1981)
The Man from U.N.C.L.E. (1964–1968)	The Girl from U.N.C.L.E. (1966–1967)
The Man in Room 17 (1965–1967)	Spindoe (1968)
Man vs Bee (2022)	Man vs Baby (2025)
The Mandalorian (2019–2023)	The Book of Boba Fett (2021–2022)
The Mandalorian (2019–2023)	Star Wars: Ahsoka (2023–present)
The Mandalorian (2019–2023)	Star Wars: Skeleton Crew (2024–2025)
Maple Town (1986–1987)	New Maple Town Stories: Palm Town Chapter (1987)
Married... with Children (1987–1997)	Top of the Heap (1991)
Married... with Children (1987–1997)	Vinnie & Bobby (1992)
Marsupilami (1993)	The Shnookums & Meat Funny Cartoon Show (1995)
Marvel's Agents of S.H.I.E.L.D. (2013-2020)	Marvel's Agent Carter (2015–2016)
The Mary Tyler Moore Show (1970–1977)	Rhoda (1974–1978)
The Mary Tyler Moore Show (1970–1977)	Phyllis (1975–1977)
The Mary Tyler Moore Show (1970–1977)	Lou Grant (1977–1982)
Mary Hartman, Mary Hartman (1976–1977)	Forever Fernwood (1977–1978)
The Mary Whitehouse Experience (1990–1992)	The Imaginatively Titled Punt & Dennis Show (1994–1995)
The Mary Whitehouse Experience (1990–1992)	Newman and Baddiel in Pieces (1993)
M*A*S*H (1972–1983)	Trapper John, M.D. (1979–1986) (Note: Legally a spinoff from the M*A*S*H feature film.)
M*A*S*H (1972–1983)	AfterMASH (1983–1985)
Match Game (1973–1982)	Family Feud (1976–1985, 1988–1995, 1999)
Match Game (1973–1982)	Match Game-Hollywood Squares Hour (1983–1984)
Matlock (1986–1995)	Jake and the Fatman (1987–1992)
Matlock (1986–1995)	Diagnosis: Murder (1993–2001)
Matty's Funday Funnies (1959–1961)	Matty's Funnies with Beany and Cecil (1962) (Note: Retitled The Beany and Cecil Show from repeat broadcasts.)
Matty's Funday Funnies (1959–1961)	The New Casper Cartoon Show (1962–1963)
Matty's Funday Funnies (1959–1961)	Casper and the Angels (1979)
Matty's Funday Funnies (1959–1961)	The Baby Huey Show (1994–1995)
Matty's Funday Funnies (1959–1961)	Casper's Scare School (2009–2012)
Maude (1972–1978)	Good Times (1974–1979)
The Maury Povich Show (1990–1998)	Maury (1998)
The Maury Povich Show (1990–1998)	The Trisha Goddard Show (2012)
Maverick (1957–1962)	Young Maverick (1979)
Maya & Miguel (2004–2007)	WordGirl (2007–2015)
Mazinger Z (1972–1974)	Great Mazinger (1974–1975)
Mazinger Z (1972–1974)	Grendizer (1975–1977)
Mazinger Z (1972–1974)	God Mazinger (1984)
McHale's Navy (1962–1966)	Broadside (1964–1965)
Meet the Browns (2009–2011)	Tyler Perry's Assisted Living (2020–present)
Melrose Place (1992–1999)	Melrose Place (2009–2010)
Meteor Garden (2001)	Meteor Rain (2001–2002)
Meteor Garden (2001)	Meteor Garden II (2002)
Miami 7 (1999)	L.A. 7 (2000)
Miami 7 (1999)	S Club 7 Go Wild! (2000)
Miami 7 (1999)	Hollywood 7 (2001)
Miami 7 (1999)	Viva S Club (2002)
Miami Ink (2005–2008)	London Ink (2007)
Miami Ink (2005–2008)	LA Ink (2007–2011)
Miami Ink (2005–2008)	NY Ink (2011)
Mickey Mouse (2013–2019)	The Wonderful World of Mickey Mouse (2020–2023)
Mickey Mouse Clubhouse (2006–2016)	Minnie's Bow-Toons (2011–2016)
Mickey Mouse Clubhouse (2006–2016)	Mickey Mouse Mixed-Up Adventures (2017–2021)
Mickey Mouse Clubhouse (2006–2016)	Mickey Mouse Funhouse (2021–2025)
Mickey Mouse Clubhouse (2006–2016)	Mickey Mouse Clubhouse+ (2025–present)
Mickey Mouse Works (1999–2000)	House of Mouse (2001–2003)
Mighty Med (2013–2015)	Lab Rats: Elite Force (2016)
Mighty Morphin Power Rangers (1993–1995)	Masked Rider (1995–1996)
Mighty Mouse Playhouse (1955–1967)	The New Adventures of Mighty Mouse and Heckle & Jeckle (1979–1980)
Mighty Mouse Playhouse (1955–1967)	Mighty Mouse: The New Adventures (1987–1988)
Mirada de mujer (1994–1998)	Mirada de mujer, el regreso (2003–2004)
Mirror, Mirror (1995)	Mirror, Mirror II (1997–1998)
Mission: Impossible (1966–1973)	Mission: Impossible (1988–1990)
Mister Charlesworth (1957)	Big Guns (1958)
Mister Charlesworth (1957)	Charlesworth at Large (1958)
Mister Charlesworth (1957)	Charlesworth (1959)
Mister Magoo (1960–1961)	The Famous Adventures of Mr. Magoo (1964–1965)
Mister Magoo (1960–1961)	What's New, Mr. Magoo? (1977)
Mister Rogers' Neighborhood (1968–2001)	Daniel Tiger's Neighborhood (2012–present)
Mister Rogers' Neighborhood (1968–2001)	Donkey Hodie (2021–present)
Mobile Suit Gundam (1979–1980)	Mobile Suit Zeta Gundam (1985–1986)
Mobile Suit Gundam (1979–1980)	Mobile Suit Gundam ZZ (1986–1987)
Mobile Suit Gundam (1979–1980)	Mobile Suit Victory Gundam (1993–1994)
Mobile Suit Gundam (1979–1980)	Mobile Fighter G Gundam (1994–1995)
Mobile Suit Gundam (1979–1980)	Mobile Suit Gundam Wing (1995–1996)
Mobile Suit Gundam (1979–1980)	After War Gundam X (1996)
Mobile Suit Gundam (1979–1980)	Turn A Gundam (1999–2000)
Mobile Suit Gundam (1979–1980)	Superior Defender Gundam Force (2003–2004)
Mobile Suit Gundam (1979–1980)	Mobile Suit Gundam SEED Destiny (2004–2005)
Mobile Suit Gundam (1979–1980)	Mobile Suit Gundam 00 (2007–2009)
Mobile Suit Gundam (1979–1980)	Gundam Build Fighters (2013–2014)
Mobile Suit Gundam (1979–1980)	Mobile Suit Gundam-san (2014)
Mobile Suit Gundam (1979–1980)	Gundam Reconguista in G (2014–2015)
Mobile Suit Gundam (1979–1980)	Mobile Suit Gundam: Iron-Blooded Orphans (2015–2017)
Mobile Suit Gundam (1979–1980)	Mobile Suit Gundam: The Witch from Mercury (2022)
Mobile Suit Gundam (1979–1980)	Mobile Suit Gundam GQuuuuuuX (2025)
Moesha (1996–2001)	The Parkers (1999–2004)
Money Heist (2017, 2019–2021)	Berlin (2023)
Mork & Mindy (1978–1982)	Mork & Mindy/Laverne & Shirley/Fonz Hour (1982–1983)
Mr. Bean (1990–1995)	Mr. Bean: The Animated Series (2002–2004; 2015–present)
Mr. Men (1974–1976)	Little Miss (1983–1984)
Mr. Osomatsu (2015–2025)	Matsu Inu (2023)
Mr. Pickles (2013, 2014–2019)	Momma Named Me Sheriff (2019–2021)
The Mrs Merton Show (1994–1998)	Mrs Merton and Malcolm (1999)
Mulawin (2004–2005)	Encantadia (2005–2006)
Mulawin (2004–2005)	Iglot (2011)
Mulawin (2004–2005)	Mulawin vs. Ravena (2017)
The Munsters (1964–1966)	The Munsters Today (1988–1991)
The Muppet Show (1976–1981)	Muppet Babies (1984–1991)
The Muppet Show (1976–1981)	Little Muppet Monsters (1985)
The Muppet Show (1976–1981)	The Jim Henson Hour (1989–1993)
The Muppet Show (1976–1981)	Muppets Tonight (1996–1998)
The Muppet Show (1976–1981)	The Muppets (2015–2016)
Murder, She Wrote (1984–1996)	The Law & Harry McGraw (1987–1988)
My Little Pony (1984–1987)	My Little Pony 'n Friends (1986–1987)
My Little Pony (1984–1987)	My Little Pony Tales (1992)
My Little Pony: Friendship Is Magic (2010–2019)	My Little Pony: Pony Life (2020–2021)

== N ==
Parent series	Spinoff series
Naked Video (1986–1991)	Rab C. Nesbitt (1988–1999, 2008–2014)
Naked Video (1986–1991)	The Baldy Man (1995–1998)
Nancy Drew (2019–2023)	Tom Swift (2022)
Naruto (2002–2007)	Naruto: Shippuden (2007–2017)
Naruto (2002–2007)	Rock Lee & His Ninja Pals (2012–2013)
Naruto (2002–2007)	Boruto: Naruto Next Generations (2017–present)
Narcos (2015–2017)	Narcos: Mexico (2018–2021)
The New Adventures of Charlie Chan (1957–1958)	The Amazing Chan and the Chan Clan (1972)
The New Adventures of Gilligan (1974–1975)	Gilligan's Planet (1982)
The New Adventures of Superman (1966–1970)	The Superman/Aquaman Hour of Adventure (1966–1967)
The New Adventures of Superman (1966–1970)	The Batman/Superman Hour (1968–1969)
The New Fred and Barney Show (1979–1980)	Fred and Barney Meet the Thing (1979)
The New Fred and Barney Show (1979–1980)	Fred and Barney Meet the Shmoo (1979–1980)
The New 3 Stooges (1965-1966)	The Robonic Stooges (1977–1978)
NCIS (2003–present)	NCIS: Los Angeles (2009–2023)
NCIS (2003–present)	NCIS: New Orleans (2014–2021)
NCIS (2003–present)	NCIS: Hawai'i (2021–2024)
NCIS (2003–present)	NCIS: Sydney (2023–present)
NCIS (2003–present)	NCIS: Origins (2024–present)
NCIS (2003–present)	NCIS: Tony & Ziva (2025)
The Next Step (2013–2025)	Lost & Found Music Studios (2015–2017)
NG Knight Ramune & 40 (1990–1991)	VS Knight Ramune & 40 Fire (1996)
Nick Rocks (1984–1989)	Nick Jr. Rocks (1988–1993)
Nickelodeon Guts (1992–1995)	Global GUTS (1995–1996)
Nickelodeon Guts (1992–1995)	My Family's Got Guts (2008–2009)
Ninjago (2011–2022)	Ninjago: Dragons Rising (2023–present)
Nirvana in Fire (2015)	Nirvana in Fire 2 (2017–2018)
Not the Nine O'Clock News (1979–1982)	Alas Smith and Jones (1984–1998)
NOVA (1974–present)	Nova ScienceNow (2005–2012)
Now Look Here (1971–1973)	The Prince of Denmark (1974)

== O ==
Parent series	Spinoff series
Ocean Girl (1994–1997)	The New Adventures of Ocean Girl (2000)
Octonauts (2010–present)	Octonauts: Above & Beyond (2021–present)
Once Upon a Time (2011–2018)	Once Upon a Time in Wonderland (2013–2014)
Once Upon a Time... Man (1978–1979)	Once Upon a Time... Space (1982–1983)
Once Upon a Time... Man (1978–1979)	Once Upon a Time... Life (1986–1987)
Once Upon a Time... Man (1978–1979)	Once Upon a Time... The Americas (1991–1993)
Once Upon a Time... Man (1978–1979)	Once Upon a Time... The Discoverers (1994)
Once Upon a Time... Man (1978–1979)	Once Upon a Time... The Explorers (1996–1997)
Once Upon a Time... Man (1978–1979)	Once Upon a Time... Planet Earth (2008–2009)
One on One (2001–2006)	Cuts (2005–2006)
Oh Yeah! Cartoons (1998–2002)	The Fairly OddParents (2001–2006, 2008–2016, 2017)
Oh Yeah! Cartoons (1998–2002)	ChalkZone (2002–2008)
Oh Yeah! Cartoons (1998–2002)	My Life as a Teenage Robot (2002–2006)
Only Fools and Horses (1981–2003)	The Green Green Grass (2005–2009)
Only Fools and Horses (1981–2003)	Rock & Chips (2010–2011)
On the Buses (1969–1973)	Don't Drink the Water (1974–1975)
Open All Hours (1976–1985)	Still Open All Hours (2013–2019)
The Oprah Winfrey Show (1986–2011)	Dr. Phil (2002–2023)
The Oprah Winfrey Show (1986–2011)	Oprah After the Show (2002–2006)
The Oprah Winfrey Show (1986–2011)	Rachael Ray (2006–2023)
The Oprah Winfrey Show (1986–2011)	The Dr. Oz Show (2009–2022)
The Oprah Winfrey Show (1986–2011)	The Nate Berkus Show (2010–2012)
Otpisani (1974–1975)	Povratak otpisanih (1978)
Osomatsu-kun (1966–1967)	Mr. Osomatsu (2015–2025)
Outlander (2014–present)	Outlander: Blood of My Blood (2025–present)
Outlaw Star (1998)	Seihō Tenshi Angel Links (1999)
Outrageous Fortune (2005–2010)	Westside (2015–2020)
The Oval (2019–present)	Ruthless (2020–present)
Ozark Jubilee (1955–1960)	Five Star Jubilee (1961)
Ozark Jubilee (1955–1960)	Talent Varieties (1955)

== P ==
Parent series	Spinoff series
Palace (2011)	Palace II (2012)
Palace (2011)	Palace 3: The Lost Daughter (2014)
Party of Five (1994–2000)	Time of Your Life (1999–2000)
Pardon the Interruption (2001–present)	Around the Horn (2002–2025)
Pardon the Interruption (2001–present)	Cold Pizza (2003–2007)
The Partridge Family (1970–1974)	Getting Together (1971–1972)
The Partridge Family (1970–1974)	Partridge Family 2200 A.D. (1974)
Password (1961–1967, 1971–1975)	Password Plus (1979–1982)
Password (1961–1967, 1971–1975)	Super Password (1984–1989)
Password (1961–1967, 1971–1975)	Million Dollar Password (2008–2010)
Pawn Stars (2009–present)	American Restoration (2010)
Pawn Stars (2009–present)	Cajun Pawn Stars (2012)
Pawn Stars (2009–present)	Counting Cars (2012)
Pebble Mill at One (1973–1986)	Saturday Night at the Mill (1970s)
Pebble Mill at One (1973–1986)	The 6:55 Special (1981)
Pebble Mill at One (1973–1986)	The Clothes Show (1986)
Pebble Mill at One (1973–1986)	Daytime Live (1987)
The Pebbles and Bamm-Bamm Show (1971–1972)	The Flintstone Comedy Hour (1972–1973)
The People's Court (1981–1993, 1997–2023)	Judge Wapner's Animal Court (1998–2000)
Perfect Strangers (1986–1993)	Family Matters (1989–1998)
Perry Mason (1957–1966)	The New Perry Mason (1973–1974)
Petticoat Junction (1963–1970)	Green Acres (1965–1971)
That Peter Kay Thing (2000)	Phoenix Nights (2001–2002)
That Peter Kay Thing (2000)	Max and Paddy's Road to Nowhere (2004)
Peyton Place (1964–1969)	Return to Peyton Place (1972–1974)
Phineas and Ferb (2007-2015)	Take Two with Phineas and Ferb (2010–2011)
Pingu (1990-2000, 2003-2006)	The Pingu Show (2006–2007)
Pingu (1990-2000, 2003-2006)	Pingu in the City (2017–present)
The Pink Panther Show (1969–1980)	Pink Panther and Sons (1984–1985)
The Pink Panther Show (1969–1980)	The Pink Panther (1993–1995)
The Pink Panther Show (1969–1980)	Pink Panther and Pals (2010)
Pinky and the Brain (1995–1998)	Pinky, Elmyra & the Brain (1998–1999)
The Plane Makers (1963–1965)	The Power Game (1965–1969)
Play for Today (1970–1984)	Rumpole of the Bailey (1975–1992)
Play for Today (1970–1984)	Boys from the Blackstuff (1980–1982)
Playhouse (1967-1983)	Justice (1971-1974)
Please Sir! (1968–1972)	The Fenn Street Gang (1971–1973)
Please Sir! (1968–1972)	Bowler (1973)
Please Teacher! (2002)	Please Twins! (2003)
Pokémon (1997–present)	Pokémon Chronicles (2002-2004)
Police Story (1973–1978)	Police Woman (1974–1978)
Police Story (1973–1978)	Joe Forrester (1975–1976)
Police Story (1973–1978)	David Cassidy: Man Undercover (1978–1979)
Pop Idol (2001–2003)	Pop Idol Extra (2002–2003)
Popeye the Sailor (1960–1962)	The All-New Popeye Hour (1978–1982)
Popstars (British) (2001)	Popstars: The Rivals (2002)
Porridge (1974–1977)	Going Straight (1978)
Postman Pat (1981)	Guess with Jess (2009–2012)
The Practice (1997–2004)	Boston Legal (2004–2008)
Power (2014–2020)	Power Book II: Ghost (2020–2024)
Power (2014–2020)	Power Book III: Raising Kanan (2021–present)
Power (2014–2020)	Power Book IV: Force (2022–2026)
Power (2014–2020)	Power: Origins (Upcoming)
Power (2014–2020)	Power: Legacy (Upcoming)
Pretty Little Liars (2010–2017)	Ravenswood (2013–2014)
Pretty Little Liars (2010–2017)	Pretty Little Liars: The Perfectionists (2019)
Pretty Little Liars (2010–2017)	Pretty Little Liars (2022–2024)
Prime Suspect (1991–2006)	Prime Suspect 1973 (2017)
Primeval (2007–2011)	Primeval: New World (2012–2013)
Případy 1. oddělení (2014–2022)	Nineties (2022)
The Professionals (1977–1983)	CI5: The New Professionals (1999)
Project Runway (2004–present)	Models of the Runway (2009–2010)
Project Runway (2004–present)	Project Runway All Stars (2012–2019)
Project Runway (2004–present)	Under the Gunn (2014)
Project Runway (2004–present)	Project Accessory (2011)
Project Runway (2004–present)	Project Runway: Threads (2014)
Project Runway (2004–present)	Project Runway: Junior (2015–2017)
Project Runway (2004–present)	Project Runway: Fashion Startup (2016)
Property Brothers (2011–present)	Property Brothers: Buying and Selling (2013–present)
Property Brothers (2011–present)	Property Brothers: Brother vs. Brother (2013–present)
Property Brothers (2011–present)	Property Brothers: At Home (2014)
Property Brothers (2011–present)	Property Brothers: At Home on the Ranch (2015)
Property Brothers (2011–present)	Brothers Take New Orleans (2016)
Property Brothers (2011–present)	Property Brothers at Home: Drew's Honeymoon House (2017)
Property Brothers (2011–present)	Property Brothers: Forever Home (2018–present)
Property Brothers (2011–present)	A Very Brady Renovation (2019)
Property Brothers (2011–present)	Celebrity IOU (2020–present)
Property Brothers (2011–present)	Builder Brothers Dream Factory (2023–present)
Property Brothers (2011–present)	Don't Hate Your House with the Property Brothers (2024–present)
Property Brothers (2011–present)	Property Brothers: Under Pressure (2026–present)
Puella Magi Madoka Magica (2011)	Puella Magi Madoka Magica Side Story: Magia Record (2020)
The Pupil (2010–2011)	Code of Law (2012–2020)
The Pupil (2010–2011)	Derek (2019)
The Pupil (2010–2011)	Forensik (2020)

== Q ==
Parent series	Spinoff series
Queer Eye for the Straight Guy (2003–2007)	Queer Eye for the Straight Girl (2005)
Queer Eye for the Straight Guy (2003–2007)	Queer Eye (2018–2026)

== R ==
Parent series	Spinoff series
Rage of Angels (1980)	Rage of Angels: The Story Continues (1986)
Ramayan (1987–1988)	Luv Kush (1988–1989)
Random! Cartoons (2008–2009)	Fanboy & Chum Chum (2009–2012)
Random! Cartoons (2008–2009)	Adventure Time (2010–2018)
Random! Cartoons (2008–2009)	Bravest Warriors (2012–2018)
Raw Toonage (1992)	Bonkers (1993–1994)
Raw Toonage (1992)	Marsupilami (1993–1995)
The Real Ghostbusters (1986–1991)	Extreme Ghostbusters (1997)
The Real Housewives of Orange County (2006–present)	The Real Housewives of New York City (2008–present)
The Real Housewives of Orange County (2006–present)	The Real Housewives of Atlanta (2008–present)
The Real Housewives of Orange County (2006–present)	The Real Housewives of New Jersey (2009–present)
The Real Housewives of Orange County (2006–present)	The Real Housewives of D.C. (2010)
The Real Housewives of Orange County (2006–present)	The Real Housewives of Beverly Hills (2010–present)
The Real Housewives of Orange County (2006–present)	The Real Housewives of Athens (2011)
The Real Housewives of Orange County (2006–present)	The Real Housewives of Miami (2011)
The Real Housewives of Orange County (2006–present)	The Real Housewives of Vancouver (2012-2013)
The Real McCoys (1957–1963)	The Tycoon (1964–1965)
The Ren & Stimpy Show (1991–1995)	Ren & Stimpy "Adult Party Cartoon" (2003–2004)
Rich Man, Poor Man (1976)	Rich Man, Poor Man Book II (1976–1977)
The Richie Rich/Scooby-Doo Show (1980–1981) (Note: Featuring the first and second seasons of Richie Rich (1980–1984) and the 1980 Scooby-Doo & Scrappy-Doo series (1980–1982) respectively.)	The Pac-Man/Little Rascals/Richie Rich Show (1982–1983) (Note: Featuring the first season of Pac-Man (1982–1983), the first season of The Little Rascals (1982–1983) and the third season of Richie Rich (1980–1984) respectively.)
The Richie Rich/Scooby-Doo Show (1980–1981)	The Monchhichis/Little Rascals/Richie Rich Show (1983–1984) (Note: Featuring Monchhichis (1983), the second season of The Little Rascals (1982–1983) and the fourth season of Richie Rich (1980–1984) respectively.)
Ricki Lake (1993–2004)	The Ricki Lake Show (2012-2013)
Ride with Funkmaster Flex (2003–2004)	Funk Flex Full Throttle (2010–2011)
Ridiculousness (2011–present)	Amazingness (2017–2018)
Ridiculousness (2011–present)	Deliciousness (2020–2022)
Ridiculousness (2011–present)	Adorableness (2021)
Ridiculousness (2011–present)	Messyness (2021–2022)
The Rifleman (1958–1963)	Law of the Plainsman (1959–1960)
Riverdale (2017–2023)	Chilling Adventures of Sabrina (2018–2020)
Riverdale (2017–2023)	Katy Keene (2020)
Road Wars (2003–2010)	Street Wars (2005)
Rob & Big (2006–2008)	Rob Dyrdek's Fantasy Factory (2009–2015)
Robot Wars (1998–2004)	Robot Wars Extreme (2001–2003)
The Rockford Files (1974–1980)	Richie Brockelman, Private Eye (1978)
Romany Jones (1972–1975)	Yus, My Dear (1976)
The Rookie (2018–present)	The Rookie: Feds (2022–2023)
The Rookies (1972–1976)	S.W.A.T. (1975–1976)
Roots (1977)	Roots: The Next Generations (1979)
Route 66 (1960–1964)	Route 66 (1993)
Rowan & Martin's Laugh-In (1968–1973)	Letters to Laugh-In (1969)
Rowan & Martin's Laugh-In (1968–1973)	Laugh-In (1977)
Rowan & Martin's Laugh-In (1968–1973)	Baggy Pants and the Nitwits (1977)
The Royal (2003–2011)	The Royal Today (2008)
Roy (2009–2015)	The Roy Files (2015–2016)
Roy (2009–2015)	Little Roy (2016–2017)
Rugrats (1991–1994; 1997–2003)	All Grown Up! (2003–2008)
Rugrats (1991–1994; 1997–2003)	Angelica and Susie's Pre-School Daze (2008)
RuPaul's Drag Race (2009–present)	RuPaul's Drag Race: Untucked (2010–present)
RuPaul's Drag Race (2009–present)	RuPaul's Drag U (2010–2012)
RuPaul's Drag Race (2009–present)	RuPaul's Drag Race All Stars (2012–present)
RuPaul's Drag Race (2009–present)	Dancing Queen (2018)
RuPaul's Drag Race (2009–present)	RuPaul's Secret Celebrity Drag Race (2020–2022)
RuPaul's Drag Race (2009–present)	RuPaul's Drag Race: Vegas Revue (2024–prsent)
RuPaul's Drag Race (2009–present)	RuPaul's Drag Race Global All Stars (2024)

== S ==
Parent series	Spinoff series
Saber Marionette J (1996–1997)	Saber Marionette J to X (1998–1999)
Sabrina and the Groovie Goolies (1970)	The New Archie and Sabrina Hour (1977)
Sabrina the Teenage Witch (1993–2003)	Sabrina: The Animated Series (1999–2000)
Sabrina: The Animated Series (1999–2000)	Sabrina's Secret Life (2003–2004)
The Saint (1962–1969)	Return of the Saint (1978–1979)
Saint Seiya (1986–1989)	Saint Seiya Omega (2012–2014)
Sailor Moon (1992–1997)	Sailor Moon Crystal (2014–2016)
Saiyuki Reload (2003–2004)	Saiyuki Reload Gunlock (2004)
Saiyuki Reload (2003–2004)	Saiyuki Reload Blast (2017)
Sally the Witch (1966–1968)	Sally the Witch 2 (1989–1991)
Sandokan (1976)	The Return of Sandokan (1996)
Sandokan (1976)	The Son of Sandokan (1998)
Sanford and Son (1972–1977)	Grady (1975–1976)
Sanford and Son (1972–1977)	Sanford Arms (1977)
Sanford and Son (1972–1977)	Sanford (1980–1981)
Sanjivani (2002–2005)	Dill Mill Gayye (2007–2010)
The Sarah Jane Adventures (2007–2011)	Sarah Jane's Alien Files (2010)
Sasuke (1997-present)	Kunoichi (2001-present)
Sasuke (1997-present)	Viking: The Ultimate Obstacle Course (2005-2007)
The Saturday Night Armistice (1995–1999)	The Friday Night Armistice (1996–1998)
The Saturday Night Armistice (1995–1999)	The Saturday Night Armistice Party Bucket (1995)
Saturday Night Live (1975–present)	Liquid Television (1991-1995)
Saturday Night Live (1975–present)	TV Funhouse (2000–2001)
Saturday Night Live (1975–present)	Saturday Night Live Weekend Update Thursday (2008–2017)
Save Me (2017)	Save Me 2 (2019)
Saved by the Bell (1989–1993)	Saved by the Bell: The College Years (1993–1994)
Saved by the Bell (1989–1993)	Saved by the Bell: The New Class (1993–2000)
Saving Babies (2007)	Saving Kids (2008)
Say Yes to the Dress (2007–present)	Say Yes to the Dress: Atlanta (2010–2020)
Say Yes to the Dress (2007–present)	Say Yes to the Dress: Randy Knows Best (2011–2013)
Say Yes to the Dress (2007–present)	Randy to the Rescue (2012–2013)
Say Yes to the Dress (2007–present)	Say Yes to the Dress: Australia (2016)
Say Yes to the Dress (2007–present)	Say Yes to the Dress: UK (2016–2017)
Scarlet Heart (2011)	Scarlet Heart 2 (2014)
Science Ninja Team Gatchaman (1972–1974)	Gatchaman II (1978–1979)
Science Ninja Team Gatchaman (1972–1974)	Gatchaman Fighter (1979–1980)
The Scooby & Scrappy-Doo/Puppy Hour (1982) (Note: Featuring the third season of the 1980 Scooby-Doo & Scrappy-Doo series (1980–1982) and The Puppy's New Adventures (1982) respectively.)	The Puppy's Further Adventures (1983)
Scooby-Doo, Where Are You! (1969–1970)	The New Scooby-Doo Movies (1972–1974)
Scooby-Doo, Where Are You! (1969–1970)	The Scooby-Doo/Dynomutt Hour (1976) (Note: Featuring the first seasons of The Scooby-Doo Show (1976–1978) and Dynomutt, Dog Wonder (1976–1977) respectively.)
Scooby-Doo, Where Are You! (1969–1970)	Scooby's All-Star Laff-A-Lympics (1977–1978) (Note: Featuring the second and third seasons of The Scooby-Doo Show (1976–1978), the second season of Dynomutt, Dog Wonder (1976–1977), the first two seasons of Captain Caveman and the Teen Angels (1977–1980) and Laff-A-Lympics (1977–1978) respectively.)
Scooby-Doo, Where Are You! (1969–1970)	Scooby-Doo and Scrappy-Doo (1979–1980)
Scooby-Doo, Where Are You! (1969–1970)	The Richie Rich/Scooby-Doo Show (1980–1981)
Scooby-Doo, Where Are You! (1969–1970)	The Scooby & Scrappy-Doo/Puppy Hour (1982)
Scooby-Doo, Where Are You! (1969–1970)	The New Scooby and Scrappy-Doo Show (1983–1984)
Scooby-Doo, Where Are You! (1969–1970)	The New Scooby-Doo Mysteries (1984–1985)
Scooby-Doo, Where Are You! (1969–1970)	The 13 Ghosts of Scooby-Doo (1985–1986)
Scooby-Doo, Where Are You! (1969–1970)	A Pup Named Scooby-Doo (1988–1991)
Scooby-Doo, Where Are You! (1969–1970)	What's New, Scooby-Doo? (2002–2006)
Scooby-Doo, Where Are You! (1969–1970)	Shaggy & Scooby-Doo Get a Clue! (2006–2008)
Scooby-Doo, Where Are You! (1969–1970)	Scooby-Doo! Mystery Incorporated (2010–2013)
Scooby-Doo, Where Are You! (1969–1970)	Be Cool, Scooby-Doo! (2015–2018)
Scooby-Doo, Where Are You! (1969–1970)	Scooby-Doo and Guess Who? (2019–2021)
Scooby-Doo, Where Are You! (1969–1970)	Velma (2023–2024)
Scooby's All-Star Laff-A-Lympics (1977–1978) (Note: Retitled Scooby's All-Stars from its second season.)
Scooby's All-Star Laff-A-Lympics (1977–1978)	Captain Caveman and the Teen Angels (1977–1980) (Note: Became a standalone series from its third season.)
Sealab 2020 (1972)	Sealab 2021 (2000–2005)
Second City Television (1976–1984)	The Completely Mental Misadventures of Ed Grimley (1988)
Second Thoughts (1991–1994)	Faith in the Future (1995–1998)
Secret Army (1977–1979)	Kessler (1981)
The Secret Diary of Adrian Mole (1985)	The Growing Pains of Adrian Mole (1987)
The Secrets of Isis (1975–1976)	The Freedom Force (Note: Part of the series Tarzan and the Super 7 (1978–1979).) (1978)
Die Sendung mit der Maus (1971–present)	Die Sendung mit dem Elefanten (2007–present)
Selling Sunset (2019–present)	Selling the OC (2022–present)
Selling Sunset (2019–present)	Selling the City (2025–present)
Seven of One (1973)	Porridge (1974–1977)
Seven of One (1973)	Open All Hours (1976–1985)
Secret Mountain Fort Awesome (2011–2013)	Uncle Grandpa (2013–2017)
Sesame Street (1969–present)	Big Bag (1996–1998)
Sesame Street (1969–present)	Sesame Park (1972–2001)
Sesame Street (1969–present)	Plaza Sésamo (1972–present)
Sesame Street (1969–present)	Play with Me Sesame (2002–2007)
Sesame Street (1969–present)	Sesame Beginnings (2005)
Sesame Street (1969–present)	Panwapa (2008–2009)
Sesame Street (1969–present)	The Furchester Hotel (2014–2017)
Sesame Street (1969–present)	Mecha Builders (2022–2023)
The Shak (2006–2009)	The Shak at Home (2009–2010)
Shaktimaan (1997–2005)	Shaktimaan: The Animated Series (2011–2013)
Shaman King (2021–2022)	Shaman King: Flowers (2024)
The Shari Lewis Show (1960–1963)	Lamb Chop's Play-Along (1992–1997)
The Shari Lewis Show (1960–1963)	The Charlie Horse Music Pizza (1998-1999)
Shaun the Sheep (2007–present)	Timmy Time (2009–2011)
Shazam! (1975–1976)	The Kid Super Power Hour with Shazam! (1981–1982)
Shear Genius (2007-2010)	Tabatha's Salon Takeover (2008)
Shillingbury Tales (1980–1981)	Cuffy (1983)
Shining Time Station (1989–1993)	Mr. Conductor's Thomas Tales (1996)
A Shot at Love with Tila Tequila (2007)	A Shot at Love II with Tila Tequila (2008)
A Shot at Love with Tila Tequila (2007)	That's Amore! (2008)
A Shot at Love with Tila Tequila (2007)	A Double Shot at Love (2008–2009)
Sightings (1992–1997)	Unexplained Mysteries (2003–2004)
Simba the King Lion (1997)	Simba Jr. Goes to N.Y. and the World Cup (1998)
Sinful Debt (1995)	Sinful Debt 2 (2010)
Sistas (2019–present)	Zatima (2022–2025)
Six Dates with Barker (1971)	Clarence (1988)
The Six Million Dollar Man (1973–1978)	The Bionic Woman (1976–1978)
The Six Wives of Henry VIII (1970)	Elizabeth R (1971)
The Six Wives of Henry VIII (1970)	The Shadow of the Tower (1972)
Skippy the Bush Kangaroo (1968–1970)	The Adventures of Skippy (1992)
Skippy the Bush Kangaroo (1968–1970)	Skippy: Adventures in Bushtown (1998–1999)
Skyers 5 (1967)	Shin Skyers 5 (1971–1972)
Slime Time Live (2000–2003)	Friday Night Slimetime (2005–2006)
SMart (1994–2009)	SMarteenies (2002–2003)
Smith & Smith (1979–1985)	Me & Max (1985-1986)
Smith & Smith (1979–1985)	The Comedy Mill (1996–1991)
Smuggler (1981)	Adventurer (1987)
Soap (1977–1981)	Benson (1979–1986)
Sofia the First (2012–2018)	Elena of Avalor (2016–2020)
Softly, Softly (1966–1969)	Softly, Softly: Task Force (1969–1976)
Softly, Softly (1966–1969)	Barlow at Large (1971-1975)
Softly, Softly (1966–1969)	Jack the Ripper (1973)
Softly, Softly (1966–1969)	Second Verdict (1976)
SOKO München (1978–2020)	Solo für Sudmann (1997)
SOKO München (1978–2020)	Leipzig Homicide (2001–present)
SOKO München (1978–2020)	SOKO Kitzbühel (2001–2021)
SOKO München (1978–2020)	SOKO Köln (2003)
SOKO München (1978–2020)	SOKO Wismar (2004)
SOKO München (1978–2020)	SOKO Donau (2005–present)
SOKO München (1978–2020)	SOKO Rhein-Main (2006–2007)
SOKO München (1978–2020)	SOKO Stuttgart (2009–present)
SOKO München (1978–2020)	SOKO Hamburg (2018–2024)
SOKO München (1978–2020)	SOKO Potsdam (2018–present)
SOKO München (1978–2020)	SOKO Linz (2021–present)
Sonic the Hedgehog (1993–1994)	Sonic Underground (1999)
Sonny with a Chance (2009–2011)	So Random! (2011–2012)
Sons of Anarchy (2008–2014)	Mayans M.C. (2018–2023)
SOP (1997-2010)	SOP Gigsters (2004-2006)
The Sooty Show (1955–1992)	Sooty & Co. (1993–1998)
The Sooty Show (1955–1992)	Sooty's Amazing Adventures (1996–1997)
The Sooty Show (1955–1992)	Sooty Heights (1999–2000)
The Sooty Show (1955–1992)	Sooty (2001–2004)
The Sooty Show (1955–1992)	Sooty (2011–present)
Soul Train (1971–2006)	Soul Train Music Awards (1987)
The Sound of Laughter (1977)	A Sharp Intake of Breath (1978–1981)
The Soup (2004–2020)	Celebrity Soup (2005–2006)
The Soup (2004–2020)	The Dish (2008–2011)
The Soup (2004–2020)	Sports Soup (2008–2010)
The Soup (2004–2020)	Web Soup (2009–2011)
The Soup (2004–2020)	The Soup Investigates (2013)
Southern Charm (2014–present)	Southern Charm Savannah (2017–2018)
Southern Charm (2014–present)	Southern Charm New Orleans (2018–2019)
Southern Charm (2014–present)	Southern Hospitality (2022–present)
Space Academy (1977)	Jason of Star Command (1978–1979)
Space Battleship Yamato (1974–1975)	Space Battleship Yamato II (1978–1979)
Space Battleship Yamato (1974–1975)	Space Battleship Yamato III (1980–1981)
Space Ghost (1966–1968)	Space Stars (1981)
Space Ghost (1966–1968)	Space Ghost Coast to Coast (1994–2004, 2006–2008)
Space Ghost Coast to Coast (1994–2004, 2006–2008)	Cartoon Planet (1995–2000, 2012–2014)
Space Ghost Coast to Coast (1994–2004, 2006–2008)	The Brak Show (2000–2003, 2007)
Space Ghost Coast to Coast (1994–2004, 2006–2008)	Aqua Teen Hunger Force (2000–2015)
Space Ghost Coast to Coast (1994–2004, 2006–2008)	Perfect Hair Forever (2004–2007)
Space Pirate Captain Harlock (1978–1979)	Arcadia of My Youth: Endless Orbit SSX (1982–1983)
Space Sentinels (1977–1978)	The Freedom Force (1978)
Spartacus (2010–2013)	Spartacus: Gods of the Arena (2011)
Special Rescue Police Winspector (1990–1991)	Super Rescue Solbrain (1991–1992)
Special Rescue Police Winspector (1990–1991)	Special Rescue Exceedraft (1992–1993)
Speed Racer (1967–1967)	The New Adventures of Speed Racer (1993)
Speed Racer (1967–1967)	Speed Racer: The Next Generation (2008–2013)
Spellbinder (1995)	Spellbinder: Land of the Dragon Lord (1997)
Spenser: For Hire (1985–1988)	A Man Called Hawk (1989)
Spider-Man (1981–1982)	Spider-Man and His Amazing Friends (1981–1983)
Spider-Man (1994–1998)	Spider-Man Unlimited (1999–2001)
SpongeBob SquarePants (1999–present)	Kamp Koral: SpongeBob's Under Years (2021–present)
SpongeBob SquarePants (1999–present)	The Patrick Star Show (2021–present)
Spooks (2002–2011)	Spooks: Code 9 (2008)
Squid Game (2021–2025)	Squid Game: The Challenge (2023–present)
Star Blazers: Space Battleship Yamato 2199 (2013)	Star Blazers: Space Battleship Yamato 2202 (2018–2019)
Star Trek: The Original Series (1966–1969)	Star Trek: The Animated Series (1973–1974)
Star Trek: The Original Series (1966–1969)	Star Trek: The Next Generation (1987–1994)
Star Trek: The Original Series (1966–1969)	Star Trek: Deep Space Nine (1993–1999)
Star Trek: The Original Series (1966–1969)	Star Trek: Voyager (1995–2001)
Star Trek: The Original Series (1966–1969)	Star Trek: Enterprise (2001–2005)
Star Trek: The Original Series (1966–1969)	Star Trek: Discovery (2017–2024)
Star Trek: The Original Series (1966–1969)	Star Trek: Lower Decks (2020–2024)
Star Trek: The Original Series (1966–1969)	Star Trek: Prodigy (2021–2024)
Star Trek: The Original Series (1966–1969)	Star Trek: Short Treks (2018–2020)
Star Trek: The Original Series (1966–1969)	Star Trek: Strange New Worlds (2022–present)
Star Trek: The Original Series (1966–1969)	Star Trek: Starfleet Academy (2026–present)
Star Trek: The Next Generation (1987–1994)	Star Trek: Picard (2020–2023)
Star Wars: Clone Wars (2003–2005)	Star Wars: The Clone Wars (2008–2014, 2020)
Star Wars: The Clone Wars (2008–2014, 2020)	Star Wars Rebels (2014–2018)
Star Wars: The Clone Wars (2008–2014, 2020)	Star Wars: The Bad Batch (2021–2024)
Star Wars: The Clone Wars (2008–2014, 2020)	Star Wars: Maul – Shadow Lord (2026–present)
Stargate SG-1 (1997–2007)	Stargate Infinity (2002–2003)
Stargate SG-1 (1997–2007)	Stargate Atlantis (2004–2009)
Stargate SG-1 (1997–2007)	Stargate Universe (2009–2011)
Storage Wars (2010–present)	Storage Wars: Texas (2011–2014)
Storage Wars (2010–present)	Storage Wars: New York (2013)
Story Parade (1964–1965)	Out of the Unknown (1965–1971)
The Story of Tracy Beaker (2002–2006)	Tracy Beaker Returns (2010–2012)
The Story of Tracy Beaker (2002–2006)	The Dumping Ground (2013–present)
The Story of Tracy Beaker (2002–2006)	Liam's Story (2014)
The Story of Tracy Beaker (2002–2006)	My Mum Tracy Beaker (2021)
The Story of Tracy Beaker (2002–2006)	The Beaker Girls (2021–2023)
Storyboard (1983–1987)	The Bill (1984–2010)
The Storyteller (1987)	The Storyteller: Greek Myths (1990)
Strange Love (2005)	Flavor of Love (2005–2006, 2008)
Street Sharks (1994–1997)	Extreme Dinosaurs (1997)
Student Canteen (1958–1990)	Lunch Date (1986–1993)
The Suite Life of Zack & Cody (2005–2008)	The Suite Life on Deck (2008–2011)
Suits (2011–2019)	Pearson (2019)
Suits (2011–2019)	Suits LA (2025)
Summer Heights High (2007)	Angry Boys (2011)
Summer House (2017–present)	Winter House (2021–2023)
Summer House (2017–present)	Summer House: Martha's Vineyard (2023–2024)
The Sunny Side Up Show (2007)	The Chica Show (2012)
Super Dave (1987–1991)	Super Dave: Daredevil for Hire (1992–1993)
Super Dimension Fortress Macross (1982–1983)	Macross 7 (1994–1995)
Super Dimension Fortress Macross (1982–1983)	Macross Frontier (2008)
Super Dimension Fortress Macross (1982–1983)	Macross Delta (2016)
Super Friends (1973–1974)	The All-New Super Friends Hour (1977–1978)
Super Friends (1973–1974)	Challenge of the Super Friends (1978–1979)
Super Friends (1973–1974)	The World's Greatest Super Friends (1979–1980)
Super Friends (1973–1974)	Super Friends (1980–1983)
Super Friends (1973–1974)	Super Friends: The Legendary Super Powers Show (1984–1985)
Super Friends (1973–1974)	The Super Powers Team: Galactic Guardians (1985–1986)
Super Inggo (2006-2007)	Super Inggo at ang Super Tropa (2009-2010)
The Super Mario Bros. Super Show! (1989–1990)	Captain N and the Adventures of Super Mario Bros. 3 (1990) (Note: Featuring the second season of Captain N: The Game Master (1989–1991) and The Adventures of Super Mario Bros. 3 (1990) respectively.)
The Super Mario Bros. Super Show! (1989–1990)	Captain N and the New Super Mario World (1991) (Note: Featuring the third season of Captain N: The Game Master (1989–1991) and Super Mario World (1991) respectively.)
Super Milk Chan (1998)	OH! Super Milk Chan (2000)
Super Sunday (1985–1986)	Jem (1985–1988)
Super Sunday (1985–1986)	Inhumanoids (1986)
Superman: The Animated Series (1996–2000)	The New Batman/Superman Adventures (1997–2000)
Superman: The Animated Series (1996–2000)	Justice League (2001–2004)
Supernatural (2005–2020)	The Winchesters (2022–2023)
SuperTed (1983–1986)	The Further Adventures of SuperTed (1989)
The Surreal Life (2003–2006)	Strange Love (2005)
The Surreal Life (2003–2006)	The Surreal Life: Fame Games (2007)
Sweet Revenge (2017–2018)	Sweet Revenge 2 (2018)
Syndicate (2022)	Myself Allen Swapan (2023)

== T ==
Parent series	Spinoff series
Take Hart (1977–1983)	The Amazing Adventures of Morph (1980–1981)
Take Hart (1977–1983)	Hartbeat (1984–1993)
Tales from the Crypt (1989–1996)	Tales from the Cryptkeeper (1993–1997)
Tales from the Crypt (1989–1996)	Secrets of the Cryptkeeper's Haunted House (1996–1997)
Tales from the Crypt (1989–1996)	Perversions of Science (1997)
Tales from the Darkside (1983–1988)	Monsters (1989–1991)
Tales of Little Women (1987)	Little Women II: Jo's Boys (1993)
Tales of the City (1993)	More Tales of the City (1998)
Tales of the City (1993)	Further Tales of the City (2001)
Tales of the City (1993)	Tales of the City (2019)
Tales of the Tooth Fairies (1993)	Romuald the Reindeer (1996)
Tarzan and the Super 7 (1978–1979) (Note: Featuring the third season of Tarzan, Lord of the Jungle (1976–1977) and the first season of Jason of Star Command (1978–1979).)	Jason of Star Command (1978–1979) (Note: Became a standalone series from its second season.)
Tarzan, Lord of the Jungle (1976–1979)	The Batman/Tarzan Adventure Hour (1977–1978) (Note: Featuring the second season of Tarzan, Lord of the Jungle (1976–1977) and The New Adventures of Batman (1977).)
Tarzan, Lord of the Jungle (1976–1979)	Tarzan and the Super 7 (1978–1980)
Tekkaman: The Space Knight (1975)	Tekkaman Blade (1992–1993)
Tensai Bakabon (1971–1972)	Ganso Tensai Bakabon (1975–1977)
Tensai Bakabon (1971–1972)	Heisei Tensai Bakabon (1990)
Tensai Bakabon (1971–1972)	Rerere no Tensai Bakabon (1999–2000)
Tensai Bakabon (1971–1972)	Shinya! Tensai Bakabon (2018)
Tenspeed and Brown Shoe (1980)	J.J. Starbuck (1987–1988)
Tenchi Universe (1994–1995)
Tenchi Universe (1994–1995)	Tenchi in Tokyo (1997)
Tenchi Universe (1994–1995)	Tenchi Muyo! GXP (2002)
Tenchi Universe (1994–1995)	Ai Tenchi Muyo! (2014)
Terrace House: Boys × Girls Next Door (2012–2014)	Terrace House: Boys & Girls in the City (2015–2016)
Terrace House: Boys × Girls Next Door (2012–2014)	Terrace House: Aloha State (2016–2017)
Terrace House: Boys × Girls Next Door (2012–2014)	Terrace House: Opening New Doors (2017–2019)
Terrace House: Boys × Girls Next Door (2012–2014)	Terrace House: Tokyo 2019–2020 (2019–2020)
Tetsujin 28-go (1963–1965)	Tetsujin 28 FX (1992–1993)
That '70s Show (1998–2006)	That '90s Show (2023–2024)
That Peter Kay Thing (2000)	Phoenix Nights (2001–2002)
That's So Raven (2003–2007)	Cory in the House (2007–2008)
That's So Raven (2003–2007)	Raven's Home (2017–2023)
That's Incredible! (1980–1984)	Those Amazing Animals (1980–1981)
That's Incredible! (1980–1984)	Incredible Sunday (1988–1989)
This Life (1996–1997)	This Life + 10 (2007)
The Three Musketeers (1966)	The Further Adventures of the Musketeers (1967)
Three's Company (1977–1984)	The Ropers (1979–1980)
Three's Company (1977–1984)	Three's a Crowd (1984–1985)
Thomas & Friends (1984–2021)	Shining Time Station (1989–1993)
The Thorn Birds (1983)	The Thorn Birds: The Missing Years (1996)
Tiger Mask (1969–1971)	Tiger Mask II (1981–1982)
Tiger Mask (1969–1971)	Tiger Mask W (2016–2017)
Till Death Us Do Part (1966–1975)	Till Death... (1981)
Till Death Us Do Part (1966–1975)	In Sickness and in Health (1985–1992)
Time for Beany (1949–1955)	Matty's Funnies with Beany and Cecil (1962)
Tiny Toon Adventures (1990–1995)	The Plucky Duck Show (1992)
Tiny Toon Adventures (1990–1995)	Pinky, Elmyra & the Brain (1998–1999)
Tiswas (1974–1982)	O.T.T. (1982)
Toddlers & Tiaras (2009)	Here Comes Honey Boo Boo (2012)
Toddlers & Tiaras (2009)	Cheer Perfection (2012–2013)
Tom and Jerry (1967–1972)	The Tom and Jerry Show (1975)
Tom and Jerry (1967–1972)	The Tom and Jerry Comedy Show (1980–1982)
Tom and Jerry (1967–1972)	Tom & Jerry Kids (1990–1993)
Tom and Jerry (1967–1972)	Tom and Jerry Tales (2006–2008)
Tom and Jerry (1967–1972)	The Tom and Jerry Show (2014–2021)
Tom and Jerry (1967–1972)	Tom and Jerry in New York (2021)
The Tom and Jerry/Grape Ape Show (1975–1976) (Note: Retitled The Tom and Jerry/Grape Ape/Mumbly Show from its second season.)	The Great Grape Ape Show (1975)
The Tom and Jerry/Grape Ape Show (1975–1976)	The Mumbly Cartoon Show (1976)
Tom & Jerry Kids (1990–1993)	Droopy, Master Detective (1993–1994)
The Tonight Show (1954)	Tonight Starring Steve Allen (1954–1957)
The Tonight Show (1954)	Tonight! America After Dark (1957)
The Tonight Show (1954)	Tonight Starring Jack Paar (1957–1962)
The Tonight Show (1954)	The Tonight Show Starring Johnny Carson (1962–1992)
The Tonight Show (1954)	The Tonight Show with Jay Leno (1992–2009, 2010–2014)
The Tonight Show (1954)	The Tonight Show with Conan O'Brien (2009–2010)
The Tonight Show (1954)	The Tonight Show Starring Jimmy Fallon (2014–present)
Tonight Starring Steve Allen (1954–1957)	The Steve Allen Show (1956–1964) (Note: Retitled The Steve Allen Plymouth Show from the 1959–1960 season.)
Tonight Starring Jack Paar (1957–1962) (Note: Retitled The Jack Paar Tonight Show from the 1959–1960 season.)	The Jack Paar Program (1962–1965)
The Tonight Show with Jay Leno (1992–2009)	The Jay Leno Show (2009–2010)
The Tonight Show Starring Jimmy Fallon (2014–present)	That's My Jam (2021–present)
Tim and Eric Awesome Show, Great Job! (2007–2010)	Check It Out! with Dr. Steve Brule (2010)
Top Chef (2006–present)	Top Chef Masters (2009)
Top Chef (2006–present)	Top Chef: Just Desserts (2010)
Total Drama (2007–present)	Total Drama Presents: The Ridonculous Race (2015)
Total Drama (2007–present)	Total DramaRama (2018–2022)
Totally Spies! (2001–present)	The Amazing Spiez! (2010–2012)
Touched by an Angel (1994–2003)	Promised Land (1996–1999)
The Tracey Ullman Show (1987–1990)	The Simpsons (1989–present)
Tracy Beaker Returns (2010–2012)	Tracy Beaker Survival Files (2011–2012)
Tracy Beaker Returns (2010–2012)	The Dumping Ground (2013–present)
Trackdown (1957–1959)	Wanted: Dead or Alive (1958–1961)
Train Man (2005)	Getsumento Heiki Mina (2007)
The Transformers (1984–1987)	Transformers: The Headmasters (1987–1988)
The Transformers (1984–1987)	Transformers: Super-God Masterforce (1988–1989)
The Transformers (1984–1987)	Transformers: Victory (1989)
The Transformers (1984–1987)	Beast Wars: Transformers (1996–1999)
Transformers: Armada (2003–2004)
Transformers: Armada (2003–2004)	Transformers: Energon (2004–2005)
Transformers: Armada (2003–2004)	Transformers: Cybertron (2005–2006)
Transformers: Prime (2010–2013)	Transformers: Robots in Disguise (2015–2017)
Transformers: Rescue Bots (2011–2016)	Transformers: Rescue Bots Academy (2018–2021)
Trauma: Life in the E.R. (1997–2002)	Paramedics (1999–2001)
Trauma: Life in the E.R. (1997–2002)	Code Blue: Savannah (2001)
Treasure Island (1996–1997)	Return to Treasure Island (1986)
Trollhunters: Tales of Arcadia (2016–2018)	3Below: Tales of Arcadia (2018–2019)
Trollhunters: Tales of Arcadia (2016–2018)	Wizards: Tales of Arcadia (2020)
TripTank (2014–2016)	Jeff & Some Aliens (2017)
TV Nation (1994–1995)	The Awful Truth (1999–2000)
Tyler Perry's House of Payne (2007–2012)	Meet the Browns (2009–2011)
Tyler Perry's House of Payne (2007–2012)	The Paynes (2018)

== U ==
Parent series	Spinoff series
Ultimate Spider-Man (2012–2017)	Avengers Assemble (2013–2019)
Ultimate Spider-Man (2012–2017)	Hulk and the Agents of S.M.A.S.H. (2013–2015)
Ultimate Spider-Man (2012–2017)	Guardians of the Galaxy (2015–2019)
Ultra Q (1966)	Ultraman (1966–1967)
Ultra Q (1966)	Ultraseven (1967–1968)
Ultra Q (1966)	Return of Ultraman (1971–1972)
Ultra Q (1966)	Ultraman Ace (1972–1973)
Ultra Q (1966)	Ultraman Taro (1973–1974)
Ultra Q (1966)	Ultraman Leo (1974–1975)
Ultra Q (1966)	The Ultraman (1979–1980)
Ultra Q (1966)	Ultraman 80 (1980–1981)
Ultra Q (1966)	Ultraman: Towards the Future (1990)
Ultra Q (1966)	Ultraman: The Ultimate Hero (1995)
Ultra Q (1966)	Ultraman Tiga (1996–1997)
Ultra Q (1966)	Ultraman Dyna (1997–1998)
Ultra Q (1966)	Ultraman Gaia (1998–1999)
Ultra Q (1966)	Ultraman Neos (2000–2001)
Ultra Q (1966)	Ultraman Cosmos (2001–2002)
Ultra Q (1966)	Ultraman Nexus (2004–2005)
Ultra Q (1966)	Ultraman Max (2005–2006)
Ultra Q (1966)	Ultraman Mebius (2006–2007)
Ultra Q (1966)	Ultraseven X (2007)
Ultra Q (1966)	Ultra Galaxy Mega Monster Battle (2007–2008)
Ultra Q (1966)	Ultra Galaxy Mega Monster Battle: Never Ending Odyssey (2008–2009)
Ultra Q (1966)	Ultraman Ginga (2013)
Ultra Q (1966)	Ultraman Ginga S (2014)
Ultra Q (1966)	Ultraman X (2015)
Ultra Q (1966)	Ultraman Orb (2016)
Ultra Q (1966)	Ultraman Geed (2017)
Ultra Q (1966)	Ultraman R/B (2018)
Ultra Q (1966)	Ultraman Taiga (2019)
Ultra Q (1966)	Ultraman Z (2020)
Ultra Q (1966)	Ultraman Trigger: New Generation Tiga (2021–2022)
Ultra Q (1966)	Ultraman Decker (2022–2023)
Ultra Q (1966)	Ultraman Blazar (2023–2024)
Ultra Q (1966)	Ultraman Arc (2024)
Una familia de diez (2007–08, 2014–present)	¿Tú crees? (2022–present)
Unique Whips (2005–2008)	Unique Autosports: Miami (2010)
Unique Whips (2005–2008)	Unique Rides (2016–18)
Up the Elephant and Round the Castle (1983–1985)	Home James! (1987–1990)
U-Pick Live (2002–2005)	Pick Boy's Awesome Summer Job (2004–2005)

== V ==
Parent series	Spinoff series
V (1983)	V: The Final Battle (1983)
V (1983)	V: The Series (1984–1985)
The Vampire Diaries (2009–2017)	The Originals (2013–2018)
The Vampire Diaries (2009–2017)	Legacies (2018–2022)
Vampirina (2017–2021)	Vampirina: Teenage Vampire (2025–present)
VeggieTales in the House (2014–2016)	VeggieTales in the City (2017)
VeggieTales in the House (2014–2016)	The VeggieTales Show (2019–2022)
Vic Reeves Big Night Out (1990–1991)	Les Lives (1993)
Victorious (2010–2013)	Sam & Cat (2013–2014)
The Virginian (1962–1971)	Laredo (1965–1967)
Vision On (1964–1976)	Take Hart (1977–1983)
Viva La Bam (2003–2005)	Bam's Unholy Union (2007)
Voltron (1984–1985)	Voltron: The Third Dimension (1998–2000)
Voltron (1984–1985)	Voltron Force (2011–2012)

== W ==
Parent series	Spinoff series
Wacky Races (1968–1969)	The Perils of Penelope Pitstop (1969–1970)
Wacky Races (1968–1969)	Dastardly and Muttley in Their Flying Machines (1969–1970)
Wacky Races (1968–1969)	Fender Bender 500 (Note: Part of the series Wake, Rattle, and Roll (1990–1991).) (1990–1991)
Walker, Texas Ranger (1993–2001)	Sons of Thunder (1999)
The Walking Dead (2010–2022)	Talking Dead (2011–2022)
The Walking Dead (2010–2022)	Fear the Walking Dead (2015–2023)
The Walking Dead (2010–2022)	The Walking Dead: World Beyond (2020–2021)
The Walking Dead (2010–2022)	The Walking Dead: Dead City (2023–present)
The Walking Dead (2010–2022)	The Walking Dead: Daryl Dixon (2023–present)
The Walking Dead (2010–2022)	The Walking Dead: The Ones Who Live (2024)
Warner Bros. Presents (1955–1956)	Cheyenne (1955–1963)
We Bare Bears (2015–2019)	We Baby Bears (2022–present)
We Can Be Heroes: Finding The Australian of the Year (2005)	Summer Heights High (2007)
The Wedge (2006–2007)	Mark Loves Sharon (2008)
Welcome Back, Kotter (1975–1979)	Mr. T and Tina (1976)
Westinghouse Desilu Playhouse (1958–1962)	The Twilight Zone (1959–1964)
Westinghouse Desilu Playhouse (1958–1962)	The Untouchables (1959–1963)
What a Cartoon! (1995–1997)	Dexter's Laboratory (1996–2003)
What a Cartoon! (1995–1997)	Johnny Bravo (1997–2004)
What a Cartoon! (1995–1997)	Cow and Chicken (1997–1999)
What a Cartoon! (1995–1997)	The Powerpuff Girls (1998–2004)
What a Cartoon! (1995–1997)	Courage the Cowardly Dog (1999–2002)
What's Happening!! (1976–1979)	What's Happening Now!! (1985–1988)
What's Up, Doc? (1992–1995)	Wolf It (1993–1996)
Wheel of Fortune (1975–present)	Wheel 2000 (1997–1998)
Where in the World Is Carmen Sandiego? (1991–1996)	Where on Earth Is Carmen Sandiego? (1994–1998)
Where in the World Is Carmen Sandiego? (1991–1996)	Where in Time Is Carmen Sandiego? (1996–1998)
Who Wants to Be a Millionaire? (1999–2002, 2002)	Who Wants to Be a Super Millionaire? (2004)
Who Wants to Be a Millionaire? (Australian) (1999–2021, 2026–present)	Millionaire Hot Seat (Australian) (2009–2023, 2026–present)
Who Wants to Be a Millionaire? (British) (1998–2014, 2018–present)	Fastest Finger First (2022)
Who Wants to Be a Millionaire? (British) (1998–2014, 2018–present)	Millionaire Hot Seat (British) (2026–present)
Who's the Boss? (1984–1992)	Living Dolls (1989)
Widows (1983–1985)	She's Out (1995)
Wife Swap (2003–2009)	Boss Swap (2005–2006)
Wild On! (1997–2003)	Taradise (2005–2006) (a. k. a. Wild On Tara!)
Winx Club (2004–present)	PopPixie (2010–2011)
Winx Club (2004–present)	World of Winx (2016–2017)
Wizards of Waverly Place (2007–2012)	Wizards Beyond Waverly Place (2024–2026)
The Women of Brewster Place (1989)	Brewster Place (1990)
The World of David the Gnome (1985–1986)	Wisdom of the Gnomes (1989–1993)
The World of David the Gnome (1985–1986)	The New World of the Gnomes (1997)
WKRP in Cincinnati (1978–1982)	The New WKRP in Cincinnati (1991–1993)
The Woody Woodpecker Show (1957–1977)	The New Woody Woodpecker Show (1999–2002)
The Worst Witch (1998–2001)	Weirdsister College (2001)
The Worst Witch (1998–2001)	The New Worst Witch (2005–2007)
Worzel Gummidge (1979–1981)	Worzel Gummidge Down Under (1987–1989)
WWF Saturday Night's Main Event (1985–1991, 2006–2008, 2024–present)	WWF The Main Event (1988–1991)

== X ==
Parent series	Spinoff series
The X Factor (2004–2018)	The Xtra Factor (2004-2016)
The X Factor (2004–2018)	The X Factor: Battle of the Stars (2006)
The X-Files (1993–2002, 2016-2018)	Millennium (1996–1999)
The X-Files (1993–2002, 2016-2018)	The Lone Gunmen (2001)
X-Men: The Animated Series (1992–1997)	X-Men '97 (2024–present)
The XYY Man (1976–1977)	Strangers (1978–1982)
The XYY Man (1976–1977)	Bulman (1985–1987)
Xiaolin Showdown (2003–2006)	Xiaolin Chronicles (2013–2015)

== Y ==
Parent series	Spinoff series
Yellowstone (2018–2024)	1883 (2021–2022)
Yellowstone (2018–2024)	1923 (2023–2025)
Yellowstone (2018–2024)	Marshals (2026–present)
Yes! PreCure 5 (2007–2008)	Yes! PreCure 5 GoGo! (2008–2009)
Yes! PreCure 5 (2007–2008)	Power of Hope: PreCure Full Bloom (2023)
The Yogi Bear Show (1961–1962)	Yogi's Gang (1973)
The Yogi Bear Show (1961–1962)	Laff-A-Lympics (1977–1978)
The Yogi Bear Show (1961–1962)	Yogi's Space Race (1978) (Note: Featuring the eponymous main series (1978), Galaxy Goof-Ups (1978), The Buford Files (1978) and The Galloping Ghost (1978) respectively.)
The Yogi Bear Show (1961–1962)	Yogi's Treasure Hunt (1985–1988)
The Yogi Bear Show (1961–1962)	The New Yogi Bear Show (1988)
The Yogi Bear Show (1961–1962)	Fender Bender 500 (1990–1991)
The Yogi Bear Show (1961–1962)	Yo Yogi! (1991)
The Yogi Bear Show (1961–1962)	Jellystone! (2021–2025)
Yo-kai Watch (2014–2018)	Yo-kai Watch Shadowside (2018–2019)
Yo-kai Watch (2014–2018)	Yo-kai Watch! (2019)
You Can't Do That on Television (1979–1990)	Whatever Turns You On (1979)
You Can't Do That on Television (1979–1990)	Turkey Television (1985–1988)
Young Maverick (1979–1980)	Bret Maverick (1981–1982)
Young Sheldon (2017–2024)	Georgie & Mandy's First Marriage (2024–present)
Yu-Gi-Oh! (1998)	Yu-Gi-Oh! Duel Monsters (2000–2004)
Yu-Gi-Oh! (1998)	Yu-Gi-Oh! Duel Monsters GX (2004–2008)
Yu-Gi-Oh! (1998)	Yu-Gi-Oh! Capsule Monsters (2006)
Yu-Gi-Oh! (1998)	Yu-Gi-Oh! 5D's (2008–2011)
Yu-Gi-Oh! (1998)	Yu-Gi-Oh! Zexal (2011–2012)
Yu-Gi-Oh! (1998)	Yu-Gi-Oh! Zexal II (2012–2014)
Yu-Gi-Oh! (1998)	Yu-Gi-Oh! Arc-V (2014–2017)
Yu-Gi-Oh! (1998)	Yu-Gi-Oh! VRAINS (2017–2019)
Yu-Gi-Oh! (1998)	Yu-Gi-Oh! Sevens (2020–2022)
Yu-Gi-Oh! (1998)	Yu-Gi-Oh! Go Rush!! (2022–2025)
Yeh Hai Mohabbatein (2013-2019)	Yeh Hai Chahatein (2019–2024)
Yeh Rishta Kya Kehlata Hai (2009–present)	Yeh Rishtey Hain Pyaar Ke (2019–2020)

== Z ==
Parent series	Spinoff series
Z-Cars (1962–1978)	Softly, Softly (1966–1969)
Zoom (1972–1978)	Zoom (1999–2005)

== See also ==
- List of American television series based on British television series
- Television shows that spun off from anthology series
- List of animated spinoffs from prime time shows
- List of television series revivals
