= Eckart Dux =

German actor (1926–2024)

- Born: 19 December 1926; Berlin, Germany
- Died: 9 April 2024 (aged 97); Sassenburg, Germany
- Occupation: Actor
- Years active: 1948–2024
- Spouse: 2

Eckart Dux (19 December 1926 – 9 April 2024) was a German actor.

== Biography ==
Eckart Dux was born in Berlin on 19 December 1926. His father was an insurance executive. He completed his actor training with Else Bongers in Berlin and made his stage debut in 1948 at the city's Renaissance Theatre. He performed numerous roles on the Berlin stage and in theaters in Munich, Hamburg, Frankfurt and Stuttgart. Dux also had many roles as a character actor in film and television.

Dux was also one of the longest active German-speaking voice actors, dubbing films from Hollywood and other countries into German language from 1949 until his death year 2024. In the 1950s and 1960s he was regularly the German voice of Audie Murphy. He also dubbed Anthony Perkins in many roles including Psycho, Steve Martin, Fred Astaire, George Peppard (in the action series The A-Team) and Jerry Stiller. After Joachim Höppner died in 2006, he took over the dubbing of Ian McKellen as the wizard Gandalf. He dubbed David Jason as Rincewind in Terry Pratchett's The Colour of Magic. He has also worked as an actor and narrator on radio.

Dux was married to the actress Gisela Peltzer, and then later to the editor Marlies Dux. He lived in Sassenburg, where he died on 9 April 2024, at the age of 97.

== Selected filmography ==
- The Merry Wives of Windsor (1950)
- The House in Montevideo (1951)
- Mailman Mueller (1953)
- Don't Forget Love (1953)
- The Singing Ringing Tree (1957)
- Two Hearts in May (1958)
- We Cellar Children (1960)
- Jack and Jenny (1963)
- My Daughter and I (1963)

=== Television ===
- Das Halstuch (1962, TV miniseries)
- Polizeifunk ruft (1966–1970)
- Hamburg Transit (1971–1974)
- Butler Parker (1972–1973)

== Radio plays ==
- 2015: Benjamin Lebert: Mitternachtsweg, part of the series: Gruselkabinett, publisher: Titania Medien, ISBN 978-3-7857-5168-8
