= Polizeifunk ruft =

- Created by: Gyula Trebitsch
- Country of origin: Germany, Japan, France (2nd season only)
- No. of seasons: 4
- No. of episodes: 52

Original release
- Release: 1966 – 1970

Related
- Hafenpolizei; Hamburg Transit

Polizeifunk ruft is a German television series. It was filmed in Hamburg.

== See also ==
- List of German television series
