= Television shows that spun off from anthology series =

This is a list of television anthology series that have had episodes spun off into full-blown series. Sometimes these spin-offs were deliberately made as backdoor television pilots.

Anthology series	Spin-off
ABC Movie of the Week	Alias Smith and Jones; The Immortal; Longstreet; Marcus Welby, M.D.; Matt Helm; Night Stalker; The Six Million Dollar Man; Starsky & Hutch; Wonder Woman; The Young Lawyers
Armchair Theatre	Callan ("A Magnum for Schneider"); Never Mind the Quality, Feel the Width; Out of this World ("Murder Club")
Armchair Thriller	Quiet as a Nun
The Aunty Jack Show	Wollongong the Brave
Amazing Stories	Family Dog
Big Bite	Summer Heights High (Character: Mr G)
Bizarre (TV series)	Super Dave (Character)
The Carol Burnett Show	Mama's Family (sketch "The Family")
Comedy Company	Col'n Carpenter
Comedy Firsts	Barbara; Sometime, Never
Comedy Playhouse	Steptoe and Son ("The Offer"); Til Death Us Do Part; All Gas and Gaiters ("The Bishop Rides Again"); The Liver Birds; Are You Being Served? ("Are You Being Served?"); Last of the Summer Wine ("The Library Mob" aka "Of Funerals and Fish")
Comedy Premieres	Cold Feet; The Grimleys
Comic Asides	The High Life; I, Lovett; Joking Apart; KYTV; Mornin' Sarge; Tygo Road
Fast Forward	Kath & Kim (sketch) Also appeared in Big Girl's Blouse
Jackanory Playhouse	Lizzie Dripping ("Lizzie Dripping and the Orphans")
Love, American Style	Happy Days ("Love and the Happy Days"); Wait Till Your Father Gets Home ("Love and the Old-Fashioned Father"); Barefoot in the Park
The Naked Vicar Show	Kingswood Country (Sketch)
Play For Today	Rumpole of the Bailey ("Rumpole of the Bailey" aka "Rumpole and the Confession of Guilt"); Boys from the Blackstuff ("The Black Stuff"); Gangsters
Seven of One	Porridge ("Prisoner & Escort"); Open All Hours
Storyboard	The Bill ("Woodentop")
Story Parade	Out of the Unknown ("The Caves of Steel")
Tight Spot	Freezing
We Can Be Heroes: Finding The Australian of the Year	Summer Heights High (Character: Ja'mie King)
Westinghouse Desilu Playhouse	The Untouchables
Wollongong the Brave	The Norman Gunston Show ("Norman Gunston: The Golden Years")
