= Hafenpolizei =

- Created by: Gyula Trebitsch
- Country of origin: Germany
- No. of seasons: 3
- No. of episodes: 39

Original release
- Release: 1963 – 1966

Related
- Polizeifunk ruft

Hafenpolizei is a German television series. It was filmed in Hamburg.
