= Hamburg Transit =

German television series

- Genre: Crime
- Created by: Gyula Trebitsch
- Written by: Irene Rodrian; Wolfgang Kirchner
- Directed by: Hermann Leitner; Claus Peter Witt
- Starring: Karl-Heinz Hess; Eckart Dux; Heinz-Gerhard Lueck
- Country of origin: Germany
- Original language: German
- No. of seasons: 4
- No. of episodes: 52

Production
- Running time: 25 Minutes
- Production companies: Studio Hamburg; Norddeutsches Werbefernsehen

Original release
- Network: ARD
- Release: 31 December 1970 – 19 March 1974

Related
- Polizeifunk ruft

Hamburg Transit is a German crime television series, first aired in 1970. It ran for 52 episodes over four series until 1974. It depicts the officers of the Hamburg CID. It was a successor to Polizeifunk ruft that ran between 1966 and 1970.

It was shot at the Wandsbek Studios and on location around Hamburg.

== Main cast ==
- Karl-Heinz Hess as Kriminalhauptwachtmeister Walter Hartmann
- Eckart Dux as Kriminalobermeister Schlüter
- Heinz-Gerhard Lueck as Commissioner Castorp
- Gert Haucke as Commissioner John
