= List of Dragon Ball GT episodes =

First Dragon Ball GT DVD volume, released South Africa by Toei Animation on February 6, 2008, depicting three forms of Son Goku.

Dragon Ball GT is the third anime series in the Dragon Ball franchise and an anime-exclusive sequel to the Dragon Ball Z anime series. Produced by Toei Animation, the series premiered in Japan on Fuji TV on February 7, 1996, spanning 64 episodes until its conclusion on November 19, 1997. Unlike the other anime series in the Dragon Ball franchise, Dragon Ball GT is not based on the manga series written by Akira Toriyama, but a project by Toei Animation; the same characters are used, and the series also continues the story where Dragon Ball Z had left off.

Funimation licensed the series for an English language Region 1 DVD release and broadcast in the United States. Funimation's English dub of the series aired on Cartoon Network from November 7, 2003, to April 16, 2005. The original television broadcast skipped the first 16 episodes of the series. Instead, Funimation created a composition episode entitled "A Grand Problem," which used scenes from the skipped episodes to summarize the story. The skipped episodes were later shown on Cartoon Network as "The Lost Episodes" after the original broadcast concluded. The series was later released to DVD in the Season set form. The first set was released on December 9, 2008, and the second set was released on February 10, 2009. A "Complete Series" DVD box set was later released on September 21, 2010. AB Groupe (in association with Blue Water Studios) developed an alternate dub for Europe and Canada and was aired on YTV and Toonami UK, which divided the episodes into two seasons instead of sagas. Funimation's English dub began re-airing in the U.S. on Nicktoons from January 16, 2012, to January 2, 2015.

Dragon Ball GT uses five pieces of theme music. Field of View performs the series opening theme, "Dan Dan Kokoro Hikareteku" (DAN DAN 心魅かれてく), which is used for all 64 episodes in Japanese. Vic Mignogna performs the English version. "Hitori Janai" (ひとりじゃない), performed by Deen in Japanese and Stephanie Young in English, is used for the ending theme for the first 26 episodes. Starting at episode 27, the series begins using Zard's "Don't You See!" for the ending theme in Japanese. Stephanie Young performed the song in English. Episode 42 marks the next ending theme change, with "Blue Velvet" by Shizuka Kudō in Japanese and Brina Palencia in English being used. "Sabitsuita Mashingan de Ima o Uchinukō" (錆びついたマシンガンで今を撃ち抜こう), performed by Wands in Japanese and Justin Houston in English, is introduced as an ending theme in episode 51. It was used as the ending theme for the remainder of the series, except for the final episode in the original broadcast, which reuses the opening theme, which was omitted in the alternate soundtrack, composed by Mark Menza.

== Seasons overview ==
In Japan, Dragon Ball GT (like both of the previous Dragon Ball series) was aired year-round continuously, with regular off-days for sporting events and television specials.

Saga (Note: The "sagas" that comprise the following list correspond to the sets of seasons released by Funimation. However, these "sagas" only correspond to story arcs (which are themselves split at debatable points), and not to the pattern in which the show actually aired in either Japan or the United States.)	Name	Episodes	Originally released	
Saga	Name	Episodes	First released	Last released
1	Black Star Dragon Ball Saga	16	February 7, 1996	June 12, 1996
2	Baby Saga	24	June 19, 1996	March 5, 1997
3	Super Android 17 Saga	7	March 12, 1997	June 4, 1997
4	Shadow Dragon Saga	17	June 11, 1997	November 19, 1997
SP	A Hero's Legacy	1	March 26, 1997	

== Episodes ==
=== Season 1: Black Star Dragon Balls Saga (1996) ===
No.	Dub title/Translated title Japanese title	Directed by	Written by	Animation directed by	Original release date	English air date
1	"A Devastating Wish" / "The Mysterious Dragon Balls Appear!! Son Goku Becomes A Child!?"; Transliteration: "Nazo no Doragon Bōru Shutsugen!! Gokū ga Kodomo ni!?" (Japanese: 謎のDB(ドラゴンボール)出現!!悟空が子供に!?)	Osamu Kasai	Aya Matsui	Kazuya Hisada; Naoki Miyahara (chief)	February 7, 1996	February 5, 2005
As Son Goku and Uub fight inside Dende's lookout, the elderly Emperor Pilaf scales the outside of the lookout, and sneaks in to the inner chamber, unnoticed. He finds the Black Star Dragon Balls, and summons the dragon Ultimate Shenron so he can wish to take over the world. After Goku and Uub finally ended their training and Uub leaving the lookout after bidding farewell to Goku as Goku is about to leave the lookout to return home as he tells Dende and Mr. Popo that he hasn't been home for so many years and thinks that Chi-Chi is going to be mad at him, he notices a mysterious light coming from inside the lookout. Pilaf was about to wish to take over the world until he is interrupted by Goku, who asks where the mysterious light is coming from and recognizes Pilaf as Pilaf discovers that Goku looks very familiar and Pilaf orders his elderly assistants, Shu and Mai to fire the missiles at Goku, but Goku stops the missiles and tells the gang that they never change. Pilaf is shocked that Goku has grew up to an adult, and Goku tells him that he is supposed to stop evil plans. Pilaf reaches rage-breaking point as he tells Goku to get away from him because he's "three sizes his size" and accidentally says that he wishes Goku were a child again so he could teach him a lesson or two, unaware that Ultimate Shenron is listening. The dragon grants this accidental wish and Goku becomes a child, shocking Dende and Mr. Popo so much. After Pilaf leaves with frustation, King Kai tells Goku that the only way he can return to normal is by finding the Black Star Dragon Balls, which are now scattered throughout the galaxy. However, Goku decides it will be easier to just grow up again after telling King Kai that he kinda likes being the size of a kid again, and he heads into town. There he finds his granddaughter Pan foiling a bank robbery while Pan is on a date as she doesn't recognize him at first and Pan discovers that the little boy is her grandfather after Goku sees Master Muten Roshi again and Master Roshi recognizes Goku and asks him of how did he become small as Goku tells Master Roshi that Emperor Pilaf summed Ultimate Shenron and accidentally wished for Goku to become small again before asking if Chi-Chi is going to be mad at him for being gone so long. He heads home for the first time in years with her, and explains to everyone what happened, which shocks Son Gohan, Videl and a crying Chi-Chi as Gohan asks his young father what is he going to do now, but Goku thinks that he is unsure with Gohan telling his father that he can only return to normal if he made a wish from the Black Star Dragon Balls. King Kai interrupts their conversation. He has discovered that when a wish is made on the Black Star Dragon Balls, the planet the wish was made on will explode within one year unless the seven balls are brought back.
2	"Pan Blasts Off" / "I'll Take the Lead! Pan Flies Into Space!!"; Transliteration: "Shuyaku wa Watashi! Pan Uchū ni Tobitatsu!!" (Japanese: 主役は私!パン宇宙に飛び立つ!!)	Mitsuo Hashimoto	Aya Matsui	Masayuki Uchiyama	February 14, 1996	February 12, 2005
Bulma begins preparing the spaceship for Goku's journey. Gohan decides to go, as well, because he can help Goku find the Black Star Dragon Balls. Pan is very disappointed that she cannot go because she's too young. Everyone (except for her grandfather, Hercule) has been treating her like a child lately, and she is getting frustrated. When it is time for blast-off, Vegeta decides that Trunks and Son Goten should go instead of Gohan, because in his eyes, the two of them have gotten soft in this time of peace. This means that Trunks will be relieved of his duties as president of Capsule Corp and Goten can cancel his date. While Goten is saying goodbye to his girlfriend, Trunks and Goku board the ship, only to find that Pan has snuck into the control room. She hits the blast-off button before Goten can climb aboard. Now Goku, Trunks, and Pan begin their adventure as Goten can finally go back to dating his girlfriend.
3	"Terror on Imecka" / "The Ultimate Moneygrubbers!! Imegga, Planet Of Merchants"; Transliteration: "Chō Gametsui!! Shōnin no Wakusei Imegga" (Japanese: 超ガメツイ!!商人の惑星イメッガ)	Kazuhito Kikuchi	Aya Matsui	Yūji Hakamada	February 21, 1996	February 19, 2005
Bulma finds a small part of the ship that fell off during takeoff. The absence of the part causes a jet to fall off of the ship. Trunks makes an emergency landing on the nearest planet, Imecka. Everyone on this planet tries to sell them things. Even the hotel they stay at charges them for every possible thing. They learn that this is all because of the new tyrannical king of Imecka. While walking back to the ship, Trunks drops the dragon radar, and it is eaten by a small robot. After they catch the robot, they see their spaceship being dragged away.
4	"The Most Wanted List" / "Wanted!! Desperado Son Goku!?"; Transliteration: "Wonteddo!! Gokū ga Shimei Tehai!?" (Japanese: ウォンテッド!!悟空が指名手配!?)	Yoshihiro Ueda	Masashi Kubota	Toshiyuki Kanno	February 28, 1996	February 26, 2005
Pan packs up the robot in her backpack. Goku tries to use Instant Transmission to catch the thieves, but finds that his control over the ability is severely limited due to his new body. They follow the tracks to the palace and sneak in. When they reach their ship, their cover is blown, and they have to make a quick escape. They safely reach the outskirts of town, but Trunks still needs a part to fix the ship. Back in town, they find that they are at the top of Imecka's most wanted list. To make matters worse, a band of military officers arrives to arrest them.
5	"Goku vs. Ledgic" / "Check It Out, A Tough Guy!! Ledgic, the Body Guard"; Transliteration: "Tsuyoi Yatsu Mikke!! Yōjinbō Rejikku" (Japanese: 強いヤツ見っけ!!用心棒レジック)	Hiroyuki Kakudō	Masashi Kubota	Shingo Ishikawa	March 6, 1996	March 5, 2005
Goku, Trunks, and Pan decide to give themselves up, so they can infiltrate the king's palace. Once inside, they break their bonds and head to the king's room. After failing to stop them with guns, he sends his best fighter, Ledgic, after them. Goku and Ledgic begin to fight, and Goku's transformation into a Super Saiyan is too much for Ledgic, and he gives up, defeated. The king promises to give his citizens free rent on their homes, and to return all of their spaceships. While packing up to leave, they realize that Giru, the robot, has integrated the dragon radar into his system, and they spot the location of their first Black Star Dragon Ball.
6	"Like Pulling Teeth" / "Hurts, Don't It!? Son Goku The Dentist"; Transliteration: "Chotto Itee Zo!? Gokū no Haisha" (Japanese: ちょっとイテえぞ!?悟空の歯医者)	Mitsuo Hashimoto	Atsushi Maekawa	Naoki Miyahara	March 13, 1996	March 12, 2005
Goku, Trunks, and Pan land on the planet with the first Black Star Dragon Ball. Everything on this planet is massive. They find the four-black star ball lying under a tree, but before they can get it, a giant apple falls on it. Then a giant bird swoops down and picks up the apple, and unfortunately, the four-black star ball is stuck in it. The bird belongs to a giant, and they follow him back to his campsite. They sneak around to try to get the apple, but he eats it before they can get it. The giant starts howling in pain, and Goku figures out that the four-black star ball has broken one of the giant's teeth and is stuck there. He flies in the giant's mouth and blasts the tooth out with a Kamehameha wave. The group leaves the planet with their four-black star ball.
7	"Trunks, the Bride" / "Honey Dearest!? Trunks the Bride"; Transliteration: "Itoshi no Hanī!? Hanayome wa Torankusu" (Japanese: 愛しのハニー!?花嫁はトランクス)	Kazuhito Kikuchi	Aya Matsui	Masayuki Uchiyama	March 20, 1996	March 19, 2005
Goku, Trunks, and Pan land on the next planet, and find the six-black star ball. It belongs to a beautiful woman, and the villagers agree to hand it over if they help them. Their village is being terrorized by a giant beast named Zoonama. The girl has agreed to become Zoonama's bride if he will stop creating earthquakes, and he agrees, saying that he'll come back tomorrow for her. Pan comes up with a plan to stop Zoonama and attempts to force Goku to pose as the girl and then cut off the monster's whiskers, which is what he uses to create earthquakes, when his guard is down. However, as Goku is too short to pull it off convincingly, the two force Trunks to do so. The next day, Zoonama comes to claim his bride, Trunks.
8	"Whisker Power" / "Even Son Goku Gets Knocked About!! Whisker Power at the MAX"; Transliteration: "Goku mo Dokkan!! Ohige Pawa Zenkai" (Japanese: 悟空もドッカン!!おヒゲパワー全開)	Yoshihiro Ueda	Aya Matsui	Yūji Hakamada	April 17, 1996	March 19, 2005
Zoonama brings Trunks back to his volcano lair, and Goku, Pan, and a villager, Doma, follow. Trunks gives Zoonama a potion that is supposed to put him to sleep. After he passes out, Doma uses a giant pair of scissors to cut off his whiskers. However, he is only able to cut off one before Zoonama wakes up. He is still tipsy from the potion, and tries to cause an earthquake with his remaining whisker, but nothing happens. They discover that Zoonama has only been predicting earthquakes, not causing them. The volcano begins to erupt. They all are able to escape but the lava from the eruption is heading towards the village. Goku is able to destroy it with a Kamehameha wave. Later, they are given the six-black star ball as a reward. The ball begins to glow, and it flies into the hands of one of the villagers, who reveals himself to be an alien. He flies in the air, and a ship picks him up and flies away.
9	"Lord Luud" / "No!! Son Goku Leaps Into The Planet of Traps!?"; Transliteration: "Shimatta!! Gokū Tobikomu Wana no Hoshi!?" (Japanese: シマッタ!!悟空飛び込む罠の星!?)	Mitsuo Hashimoto	Aya Matsui	Toshiyuki Kanno	April 24, 1996	March 26, 2005
Goku, Trunks, and Pan begin to chase after the three Para Para brothers, one of whom stole their Black Star Dragon Ball. The brothers tricked them into a rocky planet, whose center is a maze of caves. They escape, and return to their home planet, leaving Goku, Trunks, and Pan lost in the maze. Upon their arrival, they hand over the Black Star Dragon Ball to Cardinal Muchi Muchi, the servant of Lord Luud. The Cardinal is angry with them, because he knows that the three had another Dragon Ball aboard their ship, and if they don't retrieve it, he will turn them into dolls. The Para Para brothers return to the planet they left Goku and the others on. When they find them, they are being attacked by four giant worm monsters. The Para Para brothers take the opportunity to sneak onto their ship and try to steal the Black Star Dragon Ball.
10	"Dance and Attack" / "Dance Attack!? Boom-shakalaka!!"; Transliteration: "Ototte Atakku!? Bonpappa -- !!" (Japanese: 踊ってアタック!?ボンパッパー!!)	Hiroyuki Kakudō	Aya Matsui	Kazuya Hisada	May 1, 1996	March 26, 2005
When the three Para Para brothers fail to find the Black Star Dragon Ball on Trunks' ship, they realize that one of the other three must be carrying it on them. Goku figures out how to defeat the giant worm monsters, and the three make short work of them. The Para Para brothers then command them to hand over the four-star ball, but Goku refuses. The brothers then take off their armor, which turn into stereos, and they start dancing. The mystical beat forces Goku, Trunks, and Pan to dance along with them, and the brothers' leader takes advantage of their essential paralysis and begins to beat them up. More giant worm monsters appear and crush the brothers' stereos, freeing Goku, Trunks, and Pan. The three then easily defeat the Para Para brothers. Later, when searching the brothers' ship for the stolen Black Star Dragon Ball, Pan and Giru accidentally trigger the launch sequence, and the ship takes off, leaving Trunks and Goku behind.
11	"Lord Luud's Curse" / "Luud's Curse!? Pan Becomes A Doll"; Transliteration: "Rūdo no Noroi!? Ningyō ni Sareta Pan" (Japanese: ルードの呪い!?人形にされたパン)	Kazuhito Kikuchi	Masashi Kubota	Akira Inagami	May 8, 1996	April 2, 2005
Pan and Giru land on planet Luud, and with the dragon radar, they find the location of the six-black star ball. The Para Para brothers tell Goku and Trunks where their ship went, and they follow closely after them. Pan goes into the castle, but Giru, being too scared, flies away. He finds Trunks, Goku, and the Para Para brothers and tells them where Pan went. Pan fights her way into the main chamber and grabs the Black Star Dragon Ball, but Cardinal Muchi Muchi stops her by turning her into a doll. He is about to throw her into the giant cauldron when Trunks and Goku show up. Angry, the Cardinal turns the brothers into dolls and disposes of them. He then sics a giant robotic lion on Goku and Trunks, but Goku drops a giant boulder on it. The resulting explosion destroys Cardinal Muchi Muchi, but his whip transforms into his true form.
12	"The Last Oracle of Luud" / "The God's Oracle Is A Serious Issue!! Luud Starts Up"; Transliteration: "Kami no Otsuge wa Chō-Meiwaku!! Rūdo Kidō" (Japanese: 神のお告げは超迷惑!!ルード起動)	Osamu Kasai	Masashi Kubota	Masayuki Uchiyama	May 15, 1996	April 2, 2005
While Goku and Trunks fight Cardinal Muchi Muchi (in his true form which was shown on episode 11), Pan is picked up by the mysterious Master Dolltaki, the leader of the Luud cult. While he addresses his followers, they notice that he is operating Lord Luud with a remote control. He admits that Luud is just a robot, but then uses Luud to turn them into dolls. He uses the energy from the dolls to power Lord Luud. Meanwhile, Goku and Trunks transform into Super Saiyans, and are able to defeat Cardinal Muchi Muchi. They head into the main chamber to retrieve the Dragon Ball, but Master Daltaki stops them. He has finally gathered enough energy to power up Lord Luud.
13	"The Man Behind the Curtain" / "Like Father and Son?! The Mysterious Scientist Myuu"; Transliteration: "Koitsu ga Oyadama!? Nazo no Kagaku-Sha Myū" (Japanese: こいつが親玉!?謎の科学者ミュー)	Yoshihiro Ueda	Aya Matsui	Tadayoshi Yamamuro	May 22, 1996	April 9, 2005
Luud is powered up, though not at full strength, and he begins to fight Goku and Trunks. Though powerful, his fighting technique is lacking, and Goku and Trunks are able to take him down. Meanwhile, Daltaki is summoned before his master, Dr. Myuu. Myuu realizes that Luud is losing his fight, so he commands Daltaki to let Luud absorb Pan. When he refuses, Myuu turns him into a doll, and Lord Luud absorbs both of them. Finally at full power, Lord Luud continues his fight against Goku and Trunks with renewed energy.
14	"The Battle Within" / "Catch the Rhythm!? Capture Luud!!"; Transliteration: "Rizumu de Bacchiri!? Rūdo Kōryaku!!" (Japanese: リズムでバッチリ!?ルード攻略!)	Mitsuo Hashimoto	Toshinobu Ooi	Yūji Hakamada	June 5, 1996	April 9, 2005
Now at full power, Lord Luud seems unstoppable. Inside of the robot, Pan and the Para Para brothers force Daltaki to tell them how to escape. He says that there is a single cell on the chest of the robot, and that hitting it with simultaneous blasts from the inside and outside will destroy Luud, and free the people trapped inside. The Para Para brothers use telepathy to communicate their plan to Goku. After a few unsuccessful tries, Goku and Pan manage to hit it at the same time. Luud explodes, and the people inside fall to the ground unharmed. Before they can stop him, Daltaki escapes in a spaceship.
15	"Beginning of the End" / "'That's Just Great!!' Pan Runs Away!?"; Transliteration: "Mou Gure te Yaru!! Pan no Iede!?" (Japanese: もうグレてやる!!パンの家出!?)	Shigeyasu Yamauchi	Toshinobu Ooi	Toshiyuki Kanno	June 12, 1996	April 16, 2005
Giru detects a Black Star Dragon Ball on a desert planet. While the team is flying to the planet, Trunks suggests going back to Earth to replace Pan with Goten. When they land, a giant centipede attacks them and damages their ship. While Trunks is fixing it, Pan succumbs to her anger and storms off into the desert in search of the Black Star Dragon Ball. Later, Giru goes after her. After a while, Pan succumbs to dehydration and heat exhaustion, and is attacked by another giant centipede. Giru arrives just in time to save her. When she comes to, she finds out that he also found the five-black star ball and water, and she emotionally thanks Giru and apologizes for treating him so badly. When Goku and Trunks arrive, they find a nearby oasis, and use the water to refill the broken cooling tanks, and ultimately reconsider replacing Pan. Meanwhile, Daltaki is killed by Dr. Myuu's right-hand man, General Rilldo.
16	"Giru's Checkered Past" / "Machine Planet M2... Giru The Backstabber!?"; Transliteration: "Mashin Wakusei M2... Uragiri no Giru!?" (Japanese: マシン惑星M2...裏切りのギル!?)	Takahiro Imamura	Aya Matsui	Kazuya Hisada	June 19, 1996	February 22, 2012 (Note: For the English dub, this episode was originally used as the basis for the Funimation-made clip-show "A Grand Problem", which aired on Cartoon Network on November 7, 2003. The intact version, "Giru's Checkered Past", did not air on U.S. television until the series was run on Nicktoons in 2012.)
Giru convinces Trunks to land on his home planet, since he hasn't been there in years. They walk into a city that seems deserted. Thousands of Giru-like robots appear, and they all seem to know him. The three get hungry, so they go in search of food. They are confronted by a group of incredibly powerful robots who call themselves the Sigma Force. Giru jumps up to the platform they're on to join them. One of the robots disintegrates, and then reforms around Goku and Trunks, trapping them. As Pan curses Giru for betraying them, the robots, including Giru, fly away to General Rilldo.

=== Season 2: Baby Saga (1996–97) ===
No.	Dub title/Translated title Japanese title	Directed by	Written by	Animation directed by	Original release date	English air date
17	"Pan's Gambit" / "Leave It To Pan!! The Son Goku Rescue Plan!!"; Transliteration: "Pan ni Omakase! Gokū kyū shutsu sakusen!!" (Japanese: パンにおまかせ!悟空救出作戦!!)	Kazuhito Kikuchi	Atsushi Maekawa	Takeo Ide	June 26, 1996	November 14, 2003
The robots analyze the captured Trunks & Goku, & find that they each have extraordinary power, particularly Goku. Pan sneaks into their hideout & finds some robot parts. She disguises herself as a robot to further infiltrate the compound. Her identity is uncovered, & she is forced to fight 1 of the members of the Sigma Force. Real robots are revealed to have the power to walk through walls, & this Sigma Force robot uses that to his advantage. Giru has uploaded fighting data on Goku, Trunks, & Pan into the other robots, which gives them the upper hand. Angry at Giru's betrayal, Pan explodes with furious rage, & destroys her opponent. Meanwhile, Goku wakes up & breaks out of his containment chamber. Pan then breaks in, & is knocked out.
18	"Unexpected Power" / "Ya' Data's Flawed!! Son Goku's True Determination"; Transliteration: "Dēta Nya Nai Ze!! Gokū no Chō-honki" (Japanese: データにゃないぜ!!悟空の超本気)	Yoshihiro Ueda	Masashi Kubota	Masayuki Uchiyama	July 10, 1996	November 21, 2003
Trunks comes to and brings Pan back to the spaceship. There, they find that Giru has stolen the Black Star Dragon Balls. Meanwhile, Goku takes on the three remaining Sigma Force members. When he proves to be too strong for them, they combine into the Sigma Force Cannon. In this state, both their power and their speed increase dramatically. Goku has some trouble with them, but in the end, he doesn't even need to transform into a Super Saiyan to beat them. General Rilldo, who has been watching on a video screen, gets very angry. He decides to take them out himself, and he takes off toward their spaceship.
19	"A General Uprising" / "The Strongest Mutant, Rilldo Takes To The Field!!"; Transliteration: "Shutsujin!! Saikyō myūtanto Rirudo" (Japanese: 出陣!!最強ミュータント·リルド)	Mitsuo Hashimoto	Atsushi Maekawa	Tadayoshi Yamamuro	July 17, 1996	November 28, 2003
Goku arrives at the ship just before General Rilldo. The General shoots a weird energy beam at Pan, but Trunks pushes her out of the way and is hit by it. It freezes him in a metal block (kind of like turning to stone), and he is instantly transmitted to the nearby tower, where he'll be sent to Dr. Myuu's lab for dissection. Pan rushes off to save him, but she arrives too late. Meanwhile, Goku and General Rilldo have been fighting. Goku is swarmed by robots who appear out of nowhere, and he is forced to transform into a Super Saiyan. General Rilldo follows suit by powering up himself. Nearby chunks of machinery fly toward him while he's powering up, and he merges with them to become Meta Rilldo.
20	"The Source of Rilldo's Power" / "Taken by Surprise!! Son Goku's Attacked By a Metal Storm"; Transliteration: "Tamageta zo!! Gokū o osou kinzoku tsunami" (Japanese: たまげたぞ!!悟空を襲う金属津波)	Hidehiko Kadota; Storyboarded by : Yamauchi Shigeyasu	Daisuke Yajima	Yūji Hakamada	July 31, 1996	December 5, 2003
Goku and Rilldo continue to fight, but Rilldo reveals his secret power: he can manipulate all of the metal on the planet, allowing him to appear anywhere there is metal, among other things. Pan, meanwhile, is trying to sneak into the main tower, but the emergency removal system keeps spitting her back out. But with the help of another robot, she deactivates the system. Before she can destroy Giru, he reactivates it, spitting her back out. Luckily, the Dragon Balls got spit out with her. General Rilldo tells Goku to give up, because as long as there is metal on the planet's surface, he can't be destroyed.
21	"A Secret Revealed" / "What's goin' on!!? Son Goku is Turned to Metal"; Transliteration: "Nante kotta!! Kinzokuban ni natta Gokū" (Japanese: 何てこった!!金属板になった悟空)	Osamu Kasai	Aya Matsui	Toshiyuki Kanno	August 14, 1996	December 12, 2003
Goku and Rilldo continue their fight. Pan shows up to tell Goku that she found the Black Star Dragon Balls. Rilldo catches them off guard and, just like Trunks, freezes them both into metal. They are transported to Dr. Myuu's lab, where he prepares to dissect them. Giru shows up and frees both Goku and Pan with a special beam. Before he can free Trunks, another robot grabs the block, and in the scuffle, it breaks. While Goku and Pan mourn his death, Trunks appears on the nearby staircase. He and Giru reveal that everything that happened on this planet was planned by Giru and him. The metal Trunks that was destroyed was a fake. Trunks opens a secret door in the lab, despite Dr. Myuu's protests. The reason for the entire plan is inside.
22	"The Baby Secret" / "A Violent Ambition!! The Evil Life-form 'Baby' Is Born"; Transliteration: "Abakareta yabō!! Ja-aku seimeitai Bebī" (Japanese: 暴かれた野望!!邪悪生命体ベビー)	Takahiro Imamura	Aya Matsui	Kazuya Hisada	August 21, 1996	December 19, 2003
Dr. Myuu's special creation is an evil robot named Baby. Trunks has deactivated Baby's life support. While Dr. Myuu tries to revive his creation, Trunks explains that when he was transmitted to the tower as a metal block, Giru freed him, and then created a replica that he transmitted to Dr. Myuu's lab. Meanwhile, the evil scientist has revived Baby, and the robot bursts out of his container. Goku, Trunks, and Pan immediately blast him, and when the smoke clears, Baby is gone. Dr. Myuu runs to his spaceship and takes off. On the ship, Baby bursts out of Dr. Myuu, revealing that he used the scientist to create him. He crushes Myuu's head, revealing the one-black star ball inside.
23	"Hidden Danger" / "A Hidden Crisis!? A Spacewrecked Ship and Mysterious Boy"; Transliteration: "Kakusareta Kiki!? Nanbasen to Nazo no Shōnen" (Japanese: 隠された危機!?難破船と謎の少年)	Yoshihiro Ueda	Junki Takegami	Masayuki Uchiyama	August 28, 1996	December 26, 2003
Giru restores their ship, and they take off. Rilldo grabs their ship, but the trio fire a Kamehameha Wave at him and finish him off. They locate a Black Star Dragon Ball that's on a nearby abandoned ship. The four of them board the ship and find the one-black star ball. Pan sees something move, and decides to check it out. Giru informs the party that they only have two minutes until the ship crashes into the star it is orbiting. Pan finds a heavily injured, barely alive young boy, and they bring him back to their ship. Giru sends out a distress signal, and a nearby planet responds. They land, and take the boy to the hospital, where Goku is highly nervous and uncomfortable due to his severe trypanophobia. While in the emergency room, the boy wakes up, and blasts away the door.
24	"Discovering the Truth" / "Baby Strikes Back!! Target: The Saiyan!!"; Transliteration: "Bebī gyaku shū!! Nerawareta Saiyajin!!" (Japanese: ベビー逆襲!!狙われたサイヤ人!!)	Kazuhito Kikuchi	Atsushi Maekawa	Takeo Ide	September 4, 1996	January 2, 2004
Thinking the explosion was an accident, Goku rescues the boy from the burning room. Alone in his new room, the boy is revealed to be possessed by Baby. Baby then possesses a doctor and gets Trunks alone. He attacks Trunks, but Goku and Pan arrive in time to save him. They sensed Baby's energy on the planet, and they knew that he would be after them, so they have been on their guard the entire time. They attempt to destroy Baby, but he catches Trunks off guard and possesses him. As Trunks, he is about to blast Goku at point-blank range, when Trunks takes control and redirects the blast. Because Baby is in a weak state, Trunks is able to force him from his body. Baby escapes and possess a random woman on the street. Not knowing which of the thousands of people Baby is in, the three take off in their ship.
25	"Baby's Arrival" / "Big Trouble!! Baby Has Appeared on Earth"; Transliteration: "Taihen da!! Chikyū ni Bebī ga Arawareta" (Japanese: 大変だ!!地球にベビーが現れた)	Mitsuo Hashimoto	Atsushi Maekawa	Tadayoshi Yamamuro	October 16, 1996	January 9, 2004
Goku, Trunks, and Pan find the seven-star ball, and are now just two Black Star Dragon Balls short of their goal. Meanwhile, back on Earth, a mysterious and powerful thug is rampaging through the city looking for the Saiyans. Goten finds this man and defeats him and his cronies. Another strange and powerful person attacks Goten, and then goes into convulsions. Baby extracts himself from this person, revealing that it was he who was possessing these mysterious fighters. During his journey to Earth, Baby regained a lot of his strength, and is not nearly as weak as he was when he fought Goku and Trunks. Baby tells Goten that he plans on possessing him.
26	"Saiyan Hunting" / "Gohan and Goten... The Worst Brotherly Spat!?"; Transliteration: "Gohan to Goten... Sai-aku no kyōdai Genka!?" (Japanese: 悟飯と悟天...最悪の兄弟ゲンカ!?)	Takahiro Imamura	Junki Takegami	Yūji Hakamada	October 30, 1996	January 16, 2004
Goten and Baby begin to fight. Baby baits Goten into powering all the way up. Then, he takes control of his body. Baby, as Baby Goten, heads back to Capsule Corporation, eager to find Vegeta, whom he knows is the strongest of the Saiyans on Earth. Meanwhile, Goku, Trunks, and Pan find the three-black star ball, and are now just one Black Star Dragon Ball away from finishing their quest. Back on Earth, Gohan realizes that something isn't right, and brings Goten out into the country. Gohan tells him that he knows that something is possessing him. Baby, sensing that Gohan is even stronger than Goten, tries to bait Gohan into releasing his full power by unleashing Goten's power on the Earth. Gohan is forced to power up to stop him, and when Gohan has his guard down, Baby switches bodies. Piccolo arrives, but is quickly cut down by Baby who uses Gohan's Kamehameha wave to blast him and Goten away. Baby, as Baby Gohan, continues his search for Vegeta.
27	"The Attack on Vegeta" / "Ambitions Achieved!? Vegeta Possessed"; Transliteration: "Yabō kansei!? Nottorareta Bejīta" (Japanese: 野望完成!?乗っ取られたベジータ)	Yoshihiro Ueda	Daisuke Yajima	Kazuya Hisada	November 6, 1996	January 23, 2004
Baby, as Baby Gohan, finds Vegeta and Bulla driving along a highway. Vegeta notices something wrong with Gohan right away, and instructs Bulla to go home. Vegeta learns that Baby is a Tuffle who is possessing Gohan. Baby explains how the Saiyans stole the Tuffles' home planet and claimed it as their own. This forced Tuffle scientists to create a parasitic organism, and send it off into the far reaches of space. Baby, this parasite, possessed Dr. Myuu and forced him to create a body for him. Vegeta tries to stop Baby, and has the upper hand, but Goten shows up, and he is still possessed by Baby. The two Saiyan brothers are too much for Vegeta, and Baby takes control of his body. As Baby Vegeta, Baby makes his plan to turn the rest of the Earth into Tuffles, and to move onto the universe. Meanwhile, Goku, Trunks, and Pan find the two-black star ball. Now that they have all seven Black Star Dragon Balls, they head back to Earth.
28	"A Worldwide Problem" / "Son Goku Returns... 'Is The Whole Earth Against Me!?'"; Transliteration: "Gokū kaeru... Chikyū wa zenbu ora no teki!?" (Japanese: 悟空帰る...地球は全部オラの敵!?)	Kazuhito Kikuchi	Daisuke Yajima	Akira Inagami	November 13, 1996	January 30, 2004
Goku, Trunks, and Pan finally arrive back on Earth. They land at Dende's lookout, and hand over the Black Star Dragon Balls to him and Mr. Popo. What Goku, Trunks and Pan didn't realize is that Dende and Mr. Popo are still in Baby's control. They decide not to wish Goku back to normal, because then they would have to collect the black star balls all over again as Goku decides he would rather stay as a kid until he grows up instead of collecting the Black Star Dragon Balls again, much to Pan's dismay, but Goku tells Pan that he'll have a talk with Chi-Chi about it when he gets home. When Goku and Pan arrive back at home, they notice something strange about Chi-Chi and Videl after Goku believes that Chi-Chi is still mad at him for not using the Black Star Dragon Balls to return to normal size and Pan thinks that Videl is mad at her for disobeying her and going to space with Goku and Trunks. Gohan and Goten burst into the room and attack. Pan falls to the ground unconscious. Goku easily fights off the two of them, but then Vegeta shows up. According to Hercule, it seems that Baby has laid eggs inside of everyone on Earth, turning them all into Tuffles. Baby even laid an egg inside of Good Buu, but Buu was able to spit it out. Buu and Hercule, through Buu's protection, are the only two that escaped Baby's rampage. Baby, as Baby Vegeta, confronts Goku.
29	"The Fall of the Saiyans" / "The Situation is Even Worse!? Super Saiyan 3 Fails!!"; Transliteration: "Chō Yabai!? Sūpā Saiyajin Surī yabureru!!" (Japanese: 超ヤバイ!?超サイヤ人3敗れる!!)	Mitsuo Hashimoto	Junki Takegami	Masayuki Uchiyama	November 27, 1996	February 6, 2004
While Baby and Goku fight, Buu eats Hercule and Pan for their protection, and then takes off. Trunks and Bulla show up and are eager to fight Goku, since they, too, have been infected. Gohan, Goten, Trunks, and Bulla all try to fight Goku, but Baby calls them off. Baby tries to convince Goku to join him as another Tuffle. When Goku refuses, the Tuffle parasite insists on destroying him instead. Goku powers up to Super Saiyan 3, but finds that with his new body, he can't reach his full power or defend himself as well. Baby begins to pummel Goku, who is now helpless. Gohan, Goten, Trunks, and Bulla each give all of their energy to Baby, who takes on a Super Baby form and overpowers Goku with one punch. He then gathers energy from everyone on Earth and changed into Super Baby 2 form. Baby unleashed into a giant ball of energy that is similar to Goku's Spirit Bomb, called the Revenge Death Ball, and hurls it directly at Goku. It appears that Goku is killed by the blast.
30	"The Game After Life" / "Goku, Dead!? 'I Bit the Dust.'"; Transliteration: "Gokū Shōmetsu!? Ora wa Shinjimatta" (Japanese: 悟空消滅!?オラは死んじまっただ)	Takahiro Imamura	Atsushi Maekawa	Takeo Ide	December 4, 1996	February 13, 2004
Just before Baby's Revenge Death Ball could hit Goku, Kibito Kai appears and pulls him out of the way. But just as he makes his inter-dimensional shift, he is hit by the blast's shockwave, and accidentally drops Goku in a mysterious dimension. Neither Baby nor the others saw any of this happen. Goku meets a strange man named Sugoro, who challenges him to a life-sized board game. If Goku wins the game, he gets to keep his life and return to Earth, but if he loses, he must give up his life. To make matters worse, Goku is stripped of all of his powers, as they are "against the rules". They begin to play a game of chance, and Goku always seems to have bad luck, unlike Sugoro, who never has anything bad happen to him. This is because he cheats while Goku isn't looking. Back on Earth, Dende gives Baby the Black Star Dragon Balls, and he wishes for the Tuffle home planet to be restored in orbit around the Earth. He then gathers all of the Tuffles on Earth, and they begin to board a giant spaceship that will take them there.
31	"Collapse from Within" / "Even More Surprises!? Suguro-space Caves In"; Transliteration: "Atto odoroku!? Suguroku kūkan dai hōkai" (Japanese: アッと驚く!?スゴロク空間大崩壊)	Yoshihiro Ueda	Atsushi Maekawa	Tadayoshi Yamamuro	December 11, 1996	May 1, 2004
Goku discovers that Sugoro has been cheating with the help of his son, who disguised himself as a dice, and both are shapeshifting "Space Lemurs". Goku openly shouts about this despite Sugoro's pleading. The powers that run the game are angry about this, so they begin to destroy everything. Goku grabs Sugoro and blasts a hole into another dimension. Once they exit the game dimension, Kibito Kai appears and takes them to the world of the Kais. Elder Kai begins to train Goku, since he is not strong enough to beat Baby in his current state. Back on Earth, Buu, Pan, and Mr. Satan sneak onto the ship. Their cover gets blown, and Gohan is commanded to execute Pan. Just as he is about to carry out this order, Uub shows up and saves her.
32	"The Return of Uub" / "Goku Is Back!! The Enraged Warrior Uub"; Transliteration: "Gokū o kaese!! Ikari no senshi Ūbu" (Japanese: 悟空を返せ!!怒りの戦士ウーブ)	Hidehiko Kadota	Junki Takegami	Yūji Hakamada	January 8, 1997	May 8, 2004
From Pan, Uub discovers that his friend and teacher Goku has been "killed" by Baby and he vows to avenge him. Uub and Baby begin to fight, and Uub seems to be winning. Gohan, Goten, and Trunks come to Baby's aid, but he reveals that he was just testing Uub. Frustrated by his three servants' interference, he apparently kills them. Meanwhile, Goku sees what's happening on the Tuffle planet and demands to be sent there immediately. The Elder Kai begins to understand what Goku has said and decides to send Goku there without completing the training, but then reveals that the purpose of Goku's training was to grow his tail so he could have enough energy to defeat Baby, but because there is no time to waste, he decides to pull it out manually, using Sugoro's son as a giant pair of pliers. On Baby's Tuffle Planet, the parasite tyrant in Vegeta's body quickly overpowers Uub, and begins to gather a giant energy ball, just like the one he used to attack Goku. Buu takes Pan and Mr. Satan to safety. He says goodbye to them, and then flies back and absorbs the blast. Buu explodes, and the pieces of him rain down on Uub. After recalling their past of once being in one body, Buu and Uub fuse to form Majuub.
33	"The Tail's Tale" / "Take This, Baby! Newfound Majuub's Killing Light Ray!!"; Transliteration: "Kurae Bebī!! Shinsei Ūbu hissatsu kōsen!!" (Japanese: くらえベビー!新生ウーブ必殺光線!!)	Kazuhito Kikuchi	Junki Takegami	Kazuya Hisada	January 15, 1997	May 15, 2004
As Majuub and Baby begin to fight on the Tuffle Planet, after numerous failed attempts to grow his Saiyan tail, Goku ties Elder Kai to a rock and tells him to hold on to the pliers. He flies away as hard as he can, which pulls his tail out to full length, successfully increasing his energy. Back on the Tuffle planet, Majuub creates a giant energy wave and aims it at Baby to turn. After a long struggle, Baby is able to deflect the wave back at Majuub. And as a result, Majuub is turned him into chocolate and devoured by Baby just as Goku reappears through Kibito Kai's teleportation only to see this incident, is too late to save him. Now fueled by the loss of his trusted partner, Goku arrives and powers up to Super Saiyan 3 for a rematch after Baby discovers that Goku is still alive and he now has a tail. But even with his tail back, he does not seem to have gained any strength. Goku then charges at Baby, but the evil Tuffle grabs him by his tail, swirls him around in the air and throws him back to the ground, badly injuring him and causing him to regress back to his base form. As Baby flies down to finish him this time, the now-depressed Goku realizes he is again no match for his foe and then looks up at the Earth in the sky of the Tuffle Planet. Remembering his life with his friends and family on his home planet, and unable to bear his failure to protect them from Baby, Goku pleas for the power to "end this madness". Surprisingly, Goku absorbs the familiar energy reflecting off the Earth, the Blutz Waves, causing him to finally transforming into a Great Ape, but this time with golden form. Though stunned by Goku's amazing new transformation, Baby refuses to believe that Saiyans can change into Great Apes without the full moon, until he realizes in horror that Goku has used the Earth as the moon's resemblance.
34	"Back in the Game" / "The Transformation Fails!? Giant Ape Son Goku's Rampage!"; Transliteration: "Henshin Shippai!? Gokū no Ōzaru dai abare!" (Japanese: 変身失敗!?悟空の大ザル大暴れ!!)	Osamu Kasai	Junki Takegami	Masayuki Uchiyama	January 22, 1997	May 22, 2004
Fully transformed into a Golden Great Ape, Goku begins to fight Baby. It is clear that he is now stronger than Baby, but in his present state, he can't focus his mind on fighting because, according to Elder Kai, he hasn't trained properly to master his current transformation. Now succumbed to his animalistic Saiyan instincts, Goku goes on a rampaging out of control, destroying everything in sight without even killing those controlled by Baby. Later, Goku is about to drink from the lake, until he again sees the Earth, and climbs up the cliffs towards it. Unbeknownst to the savage Goku, Pan and Mr. Satan were following him quietly after learning he has survived somehow and barely even recognize him in his Great Ape form. Meanwhile, Baby escapes to his tower where the infected Bulma is, thinking of his new plan in motion. His scheme; to lock on the Earth and transform into a Golden Great Ape, hoping to come back for another fight with Goku. Now on a mountaintop, Goku tries to reach for the Earth, when Pan shows up in front of him. Pan tries to bring her grandfather to his sense with almost everything she has of him, but Goku swats her away. Then she shows him a picture of their family and friends on a beach vacation on Earth, and combined with Pan's tears, this reminds Goku of who he is. Goku then begins to transform and, much to Pan's amazement, Goku is found as an adult and later a Super Saiyan 4, a new level of power secretly planned in his training by Old Kai.
35	"Goku's Ascension" / "The Strongest Form! Son Goku Becomes A Super Saiyan 4!!"; Transliteration: "Saikyō! Gokū ga sūpā Saiya-jin Fō ni!!" (Japanese: 最強!!悟空が超サイヤ人4に!!)	Mitsuo Hashimoto	Atsushi Maekawa	Akira Inagami	January 29, 1997	May 29, 2004
In his new form, Goku's powers are incredible & he is now an adult again. He tells Pan & Hercule that he will find Baby & will defeat him once & for all. On his tower, Baby & Bulma find a puzzling information on how did the Earth give Goku the Blutz Waves to become a Golden Great Ape, & Bulma explain the reason Baby can't turn into one since he took control of Vegeta's body is that the Saiyan Prince no longer has a tail. Goku finds Baby, & they begin to fight. It seems like Baby still has the upper hand, but Goku reveals that he hasn't even been trying. Now on the offensive, Goku seems indestructible, & Baby is no match for him. Bulma contacts Baby, saying that she's found a way to focus Blutz Waves onto him, which would turn him into a Golden Great Ape. It turns out that Bulma has created her Blutz Wave Generator. Using her generator, she hits him with this beam just before Goku releases a Kamehameha wave & Baby transforms into a Golden Great Ape. Note: This episode was released as a short in the second Issue of the Limited DVD series. It came with Prima's Official Strategy Guide of Dragon Ball Z: Budokai.
36	"The Tuffle Gorilla Attacks" / "An Immortal Beast!? The Atrocious Giant Ape Baby"; Transliteration: "Fujimi no kaibutsu!? Kyōaku ōzaru bebī" (Japanese: 不死身の怪物!?凶悪大ザルベビー)	Takahiro Imamura	Atsushi Maekawa	Noboru Koizumi; Tadayoshi Yamamuro (chief)	February 5, 1997	June 5, 2004
The Super Saiyan 4 Goku and the Golden Great Ape Baby begin to fight. In his new state, Baby is more powerful, but just like with Goku, lacks control of himself. He begins to destroy his own city and his people. Goku is able to fight back, and is confident that he can win. Baby begins to speak to Goku normally. He says that while Vegeta's body transformed, he, the parasite, remained unchanged. He was only destroying his people for fun. He then aims a Super Galic Gun right at the Earth, and Goku isn't quick enough to stop it. Though the Earth is not destroyed, the blast has caused it significant damage, and it won't be able to take another direct hit. Goku hits Baby with a Kamehameha wave, but it does little damage. Baby aims another beam right at the Earth, but Goku gets in the way and takes the full force of the blast.
37	"Old Kai's Last Stand" / "What a Turnout!! Baby and Son Goku -- Double KO!!"; Transliteration: "Sōzetsu!! Bebī to Gokū Daburu Keī Ō!!" (Japanese: 壮絶!!ベビーと悟空ダブルKO!!)	Yoshihiro Ueda	Toshinobu Ooi	Yūji Hakamada	February 12, 1997	June 12, 2004
Goku's Kamehameha wave has a delayed effect, and knocks Baby down. They get back up, only to knock each other out. Elder Kai takes advantage of this and sends Kibito Kai to Dende's lookout. His plan is to use the Sacred Water, the same water that was used to return Earth to normal after they beat Garlic Jr, to revive the other Saiyans. Kibito Kai finds the water and uses it on Dende and Mr. Popo. Then he arrives on the Tuffle planet and uses it to revive Trunks. Back on the Tuffle Planet, Bulma uses the Blutz Wave Generator again to restore Baby to his full strength. Goku wakes up, and it seems like he, too, has regained his strength, though he is only bluffing. He tries his best to avoid Baby's attacks while still seeming confident.
38	"Family Bonds" / "The Revival Of Super Saiyan 4 With Everyone's Powers..."; Transliteration: "Minna no pawā de... Sūpā saiya-jin Fō fukkatsu" (Japanese: みんなの力で...超サイヤ人4復活)	Hidehiko Kadota	Toshinobu Ooi	Kazuya Hisada	February 19, 1997	June 19, 2004
Goku can no longer avoid Baby, and he gets severely beaten. Pan can't stand to look on anymore and rushes in to confront Baby. Baby knocks her down and is about to stomp on her, when Trunks shows up and blasts Baby away. Gohan and Goten arrive, and they prepare to fight. Goku stops them, saying that the only thing powerful enough to stop Baby is the Super Saiyan 4. He instructs them to give him their energy so he can fight. Realizing this, Baby attacks them. Baby begins writhing in pain. Majuub, whom Baby had eaten, has regained his form and is attacking from the inside, revealing that he had purposely allowed Baby to deflect his attack and eat him. This gives them enough time to give Goku their energy. Baby spits Majuub out, and with Goku at full power, the final battle begins.
39	"Baby Put to Rest" / "The Finale! At Last, Baby Is Annihilated"; Transliteration: "Kore de Saigo da! Tsui ni bebī shōmetsu" (Japanese: これで最後だ!ついにベビー消滅)	Kazuhito Kikuchi	Junki Takegami	Masayuki Uchiyama	February 26, 1997	June 26, 2004
Now that he's at full power, Goku is much stronger than Baby. With no other way out, Baby hits Goku with his Revenge Death Ball. Goku is enveloped by the blast, but refuses to give up. He absorbs the energy. He then fires a powerful Kamehameha wave at Baby, knocking him unconscious. Goku then blasts away Baby's tail, causing him to regress into his earlier form. Knowing that he is greatly outmatched, Baby extracts himself from Vegeta's body & flees to his ship. Vegeta fully recovers but Baby flies away. Determined to finish him off, Goku fires another Kamehameha wave at Baby's ship, blasting it into the sun. They head back to Earth before Goku returns to his child form & sprinkle the entire surface with sacred water, while Kibito Kai & Gohan do the same on the Tuffle planet. The Earth begins to shake violently. Because Baby made the wish on the Black Star Dragon Balls, the planet is still in danger of exploding. In two weeks, it will be 1 year since Goku was transformed & will mark the end of the Earth.
40	"Piccolo's Decision" / "Earth Explodes!! Piccolo's Grave Decision"; Transliteration: "Chikyū Bakuhatsu! Pikkoro no Jūdaina Ketsui" (Japanese: 地球爆発!!ピッコロの重大な決意)	Mitsuo Hashimoto	Atsushi Maekawa	Tadayoshi Yamamuro	March 5, 1997	July 3, 2004
Vegeta decides to evacuate the Earth's population to the Tuffle planet using ships & Goku's Instant Transmission, which he can use again as Super Saiyan 4. Mr. Satan convinces the people that the Earth really is going to explode. As the last ship is leaving Earth, Goku locates the last four stragglers, but someone realizes they left their son back on the planet. Goku finds him, along with Piccolo. He loses his Super Saiyan 4 form & can't use Instant Transmission. Piccolo gives him his energy, allowing him to make one last trip. He takes the boy back, but Piccolo lets go of him & is left on Earth. He telepathically tells Gohan that the Black Star Dragon Balls are extremely dangerous & he plans to sacrifice himself so that they can never be used again as he makes a final goodbye to Gohan. After Earth explodes, they make a wish on Namek's Dragon Balls to restore the planet. With the planet restored, everybody begins to celebrate as Chi-Chi tells Bulma no matter how big or small he is, Goku is still her husband. Gohan mourns the loss of Piccolo, who was his master, and Goku tells him that he misses him too.

=== Season 3: Super Android 17 Saga (1997) ===
All episodes in this season are written by Atsushi Maekawa

No.	Dub title/Translated title Japanese title	Directed by	Animation directed by	Art directed by	Original release date	English air date
41	"Curtain Call" / "The Number One Under The Sun Tournament. Who Will Be Satan's Successor?"; Transliteration: "Tenkaiichi budōkai. Satan no kōkeisha wa dare" (Japanese: 天下一武道会 サタンの後継者は誰)	Takahiro Imamura	Masayuki Uchiyama	Tomoko Yoshida	March 12, 1997	July 10, 2004
Goku, Pan, and Majuub enter the 30th World Martial Arts Tournament. Goku is forced to enter the Junior Division, since he is a child again; when he asks Mr. Satan about this, he states it is because of his height, and Pan fights in the Adult Division because she is taller than he is. In reality, he doesn't want Pan to end up fighting Goku, and wants Pan to succeed him as World Champion. Goku makes it to the finals, but is accidentally knocked out of the ring by his opponent after being distracted by Vegeta, and loses. Pan makes it to the semi-finals of the Adult Division, but forfeits because she doesn't want to turn out like her grandpa, Mr. Satan. Majuub makes it to the finals against Mr. Satan and takes the fight seriously. He is about to win, when Buu, from inside of him, tells him to let Mr. Satan win, as Mr. Satan gives the world hope. Majuub gets knocked out of the ring and Mr. Satan retains the title of World Champion. Note: This episode was released as a short in the third Issue of the Limited DVD series. It came with Prima's Official Strategy Guide of Dragon Ball Z: Taiketsu.
42	"A Dangerous Union" / "Die, Goku!! The Revived Villains Escape From Hell"; Transliteration: "Shine Gokū!! Jigoku kara yomigaeru kyōteki-tachi" (Japanese: 死ね悟空!!地獄から蘇る強敵たち)	Kazuhito Kikuchi	Tadayoshi Yamamuro	Tomoko Yoshida	April 16, 1997	July 17, 2004
Trunks shows up at Goku's house badly beaten, and a black hole has suddenly appeared in the sky. When he recovers, he explains that Android 17 attacked him, and said that Dr. Gero and Dr. Myuu have demanded that Goku come to hell through the black hole and fight them, or else they will resurrect Cell and Frieza and send them to Earth. A reporter on TV says that there are mysterious monsters destroying the city, and they recognize the monsters as everyone Goku has defeated over the years. Goku decides to go to hell and fight. Down in hell, Dr. Gero and Dr. Myuu explain that they created a replica of the Android 17 on Earth, but altered both of their programming to make them completely loyal. When these two androids fuse together, the resulting Super Android 17 will have unbelievable power. When Goku arrives in hell, Dr. Gero and Dr. Myuu flee, and close up the hole connecting Earth and hell, trapping Goku inside. Cell and Frieza show up, and now that he's trapped in hell, he has no choice but to fight them.
43	"The Resurrection of Cell and Frieza" / "The Villains Of Hell!! The Revival of Cell and Frieza"; Transliteration: "Jigoku no masenshi! Seru & Furīza fukkatsu" (Japanese: 地獄の魔戦士!セル&フリーザ復活)	Mitsuo Hashimoto	Noboru Koizumi	Koji Sakaki	April 23, 1997	July 24, 2004
Goku begins his fight with his old enemies Frieza and Cell and it is clear that Goku is far stronger than both of them combined. He quickly defeats them but is unable to kill them as they are already dead. They trap Goku in a cage of energy and force him down into the depths of hell. There, he is tortured in various ways, finally being trapped in a block of ice. Back on Earth, Gohan fights General Rilldo, who turns his arm into metal with his metal beam. While Vegeta fights with the new Android 17, the original Android 17 confronts his twin sister Android 18 and hypnotizes her. Note: This episode was released as a short in the fourth Issue of the Limited DVD series. It came with Prima's Official Strategy Guide of Dragon Ball Z: Budokai 2.
44	"17 Times 2" / "The Ultimate Android! The Two #17s Unite"; Transliteration: "Kyūkyoku Jinzō-ningen! Futari no 17-gō gattai" (Japanese: 究極の人造人間!二人の17号合体)	Yoshihiro Ueda	Kazuya Hisada	Tomoko Yoshida	April 30, 1997	July 31, 2004
Android 17 tells the hypnotized Android 18 to join him, but her husband Krillin brings her back to her senses, prompting 17 to kill him. 18 attacks 17 to avenge Krillin, but is defeated. Down in hell, Goku's body heat weakens the ice enough for him to break it, and once he's out, he uses the freezing machine on Frieza and Cell and then accidentally shatters them. Back on Earth, the two 17's find each other and merge, forming Super Android 17. Vegeta, Trunks, Gohan, Goten, and Majuub all try to attack him, but they are all overwhelmed. Watching this from hell, Goku asks King Yemma if he can bring him to Earth, but it is beyond Yemma's power. Piccolo, however, has a plan, and requests that King Yemma send him to hell; when King Yemma refuses, Piccolo convinces him that he made a mistake by wreaking havoc with numerous energy waves and is sent to hell.
45	"Piccolo's Best Bet" / "Hurry, Goku!! The Plan to Escape From Hell"; Transliteration: "Isoge Gokū!! Jigoku kara no dassutsu daisakusen" (Japanese: 急げ悟空!!地獄からの脱出大作戦)	Hidehiko Kadota	Masayuki Uchiyama	Ryūji Yoshi'ike	May 14, 1997	August 7, 2004
Piccolo's plan is to replicate the method that the two Android 17's used to escape from hell. He telepathically communicates his plan with Dende. They try to send an energy blast to each other at the same time. After several tries, they finally hit at the exact same moment, and another black hole opens up. Piccolo, unfortunately, cannot follow Goku back to Earth, as he must remain perfectly still for the portal to remain open, but assures Goku that it will be all right; he is willing to spend eternity in hell to help his old friend. Accepting, Goku returns to Earth, while Piccolo decides to get in some "target practice" with some of the old villains. Meanwhile, Dr. Myuu orders Super 17 to kill Dr. Gero, revealing that he programmed Super 17 to only follow his orders. With Gero out of the picture, he tells Super 17 to finish them all off. Just as he's about to blast Vegeta, Goku arrives and pushes him out of the way and turns his attention to Super 17.
46	"Raising the Stakes" / "They Clash!! Super Saiyan Goku 4 VS Super #17"; Transliteration: "Gekitō!! Sūpā Saiyajin 4 VS Sūpā 17-gō" (Japanese: 激突!!スーパーサイヤ人4 vs. スーパー17号)	Takahiro Imamura	Yūji Hakamada	Tomoko Yoshida	May 28, 1997	August 14, 2004
Goku and Super Android 17 begin to fight. The battle is clearly in Super 17's favor, as Gero and Myuu programmed knowledge of all of Goku's techniques and abilities into him; however, Goku transforms into Super Saiyan 4, which neither Gero or Myuu knew about. He hits Super 17 with hundreds of energy blasts, but none of them seem to hurt the android. He tries a Kamehameha wave, but Super 17 makes no effort to get out of the way, and Goku realizes that Super 17 is absorbing the energy, just like Android 19 did, but without the devices on the hands. Super Android 17 has now absorbed so much energy that he is stronger than Goku. Goku tries to use Instant Transmission to sneak up on Super 17, but the Super Android can sense where he is going to appear by analyzing the distortion Instant Transmission causes in the atmosphere. With none of Goku's tactics working, Super Android 17 conjures a powerful energy ball to finish him off.
47	"The Greatest Surprise" / "A Grand Turnabout! Goku's and #18's Combo Attack Explodes"; Transliteration: "Daigyakuten! Gokū to 18-gō no nidan kōgeki sakuretsu" (Japanese: 大逆転!悟空と18号の二段攻撃さく裂)	Kazuhito Kikuchi	Takeo Ide	Ryūji Yoshi'ike	June 4, 1997	August 21, 2004
While Super 17 is distracted by making his energy ball, Goku sneaks up from behind and grabs him. He tries to blow them both up, but when the smoke clears, both of them remain alive. Super 17 had put up a shield to protect himself, but it also protected Goku just enough to keep him alive. Once again, he gathers energy for his final attack, but suddenly 18 shows up. Her taunts cause Super 17 to turn and destroy Dr. Myuu. He turns back to kill Goku, but before he can, 18 starts firing energy blasts at him. While Super 17 is absorbing the blasts, Goku realizes that he is unable to move while absorbing energy and thus vulnerable, and he quickly attacks, punching a hole through him with a Dragon Fist. He finishes Super 17 off with a Kamehameha wave. Bulma arrives, saying that the Earth is incredibly unstable because of the interdimensional portals that 17 and Piccolo opened up. They gather the Dragon Balls to fix this, only to find that they are all cracked. When they call Shenron, black smoke issues from them, and a mysterious but powerful new dragon emerges.

=== Season 4: Shadow Dragon Saga (1997) ===
No.	Dub title/Translated title Japanese title	Directed by	Written by	Animation directed by	Original release date	English air date
48	"The Shadow Dragons" / "A Shocking Surprise! Shenron Is Our Enemy?!"; Transliteration: "Kore wa Bikkuri! Shenron ga teki ni?!" (Japanese: これはビックリ!神龍が敵に?!)	Mitsuo Hashimoto	Toshinobu Ooi	Tadayoshi Yamamuro	June 11, 1997	August 28, 2004
The new dragon turns out to be pure evil. He sucks up the Dragon Balls and then splits into seven more dragons, which then fly away to different parts of Earth. As Goku and the others try to understand what happened, the Elder and Kibito Kais speak to them; Elder Kai chastises them by reminding them of his warning about using the Dragon Balls. Elder Kai explains that each time the Dragon Balls are used, they store negative energy, and that energy takes 100 years to dissipate. The reason the balls scatter after they're used is to give them time to release their negative energy. But because Bulma invented the dragon radar, they were able to find them very quickly and summon Shenron many times. This overuse caused the balls to overload themselves with negative energy, and that energy spawned the Shadow Dragons. All those present blame Bulma for this, but she quickly places the blame first on Dende (the Nameks knew of the risks of overusing the balls) before blaming Goku for helping her find them over the years. Regardless of who is to blame, Goku, feeling guilty for having used the Dragon Balls so often, goes off alone to slay the shadow dragons, as they will potentially destroy the universe if left unchecked. Goku follows the destructive path left by the Shadow Dragons and Pan follows him, bringing Giru along to use the dragon radar. They find the two-star dragon destroying a village.
49	"The Two-Star Dragon" / "The Strongest Enemy!? The Fearsome Underhanded Dragon"; Transliteration: "Saikyō no teki!? Kyōfu no urawaza o tsukau ryū" (Japanese: 最強の敵?!恐怖の裏ワザを使う龍)	Yoshihiro Ueda	Toshinobu Ooi	Noboru Koizumi	June 18, 1997	September 4, 2004
The two-star dragon, Haze Shenron, is severely polluting the entire area, so Pan steps in to stop him. She is much more powerful than Haze and relentlessly beats it up. But Pan's attacks seem to do less and less, until Haze is able to overpower her. Goku tries to transform into a Super Saiyan and finds that he is unable to. Haze explains that his pollution causes all living things to exponentially weaken, die and decay over a short period of time. This is why Pan's strength is gone and why Goku can't power up. He also reveals that he was created when Goku wished to revive Bora, father of his old friend Upa, after he was killed by Mercenary Tao, horrifying Goku with the fact that he was indeed responsible for the creation of the Shadow Dragons. Haze beats them up and then throws them into the lake. Giru, who is unaffected by the poison due to being a robot, goes underwater and pulls them to an uninfected part of the lake. There is a spring here that is feeding in pure water from underground, keeping the area clean. Goku blasts the hole, flooding the lake with clean water. With their powers rejuvenated, Goku and Pan destroy Haze quickly before his pollution has enough time to take effect and claim the two-star ball, which returns to its original form.
50	"The Five-Star Dragon" / "Down Goes Saiya-Power!? Electro-Dragon Wu Xing Long"; Transliteration: "Saiya pawā gyokusai!? Denkijū Ūshinron" (Japanese: サイヤパワー玉砕!?電気獣五星龍)	Hidehiko Kadota	Atsushi Maekawa	Masayuki Uchiyama	June 25, 1997	September 11, 2004
Goku, Pan, and Giru go to a nearby city to get something to drink but they find that all its inhabitants are nowhere to be seen. They find some weird electric slime, and they figure out that the five-star dragon, Rage Shenron, is controlling the slime. After revealing that he was created when Master Roshi and Bulma wished to revive Goku when Vegeta and Nappa originally came to Earth, he gathers the slime and becomes gigantic. Goku transforms into a Super Saiyan 4 and tries to blast Rage, but the slime bounces his attack back at him. The dragon traps Goku and Pan in the slime, which begins to electrocute them. It begins to rain, causing the dragon to short circuit and explode. Rage tricks Pan by admitting defeat and when she tries to claim the five-star ball, Rage tries to trap her but she gets out of the way. Goku then destroys him by using a normal Kamehameha Wave. Goku and Pan claim the five-star ball.
51	"The Six-Star Dragon" / "Liu Xing Long! Find The Big Tornado Attack's Weak Point"; Transliteration: "Ryū Shinron! Daitatsumaki kogeki no jakuten o sakase" (Japanese: 六星龍!大竜巻攻撃の弱点を探せ)	Takahiro Imamura	Atsushi Maekawa	Kazuya Hisada	July 2, 1997	October 23, 2004
Goku, Pan, and Giru find the six-star dragon, Oceanus Shenron, in a fishing village. She reveals that she was created by the very first wish that Goku and company ever made (Oolong wishing for a pair of underwear in order to thwart Emperor Pilaf's wish of dominate the world); while both she and Pan are disgusted and embarrassed by this, Goku looks back on it with humor, much to Oceanus's full anger. Oceanus can put up energy shields so Goku can't hit her. He tries to use a Kamehameha wave, but Oceanus deflects it. Oceanus then creates an extremely powerful vortex, smashing Goku through a cliff. Pan creates her first Kamehameha wave and blasts it at Oceanus, which gives Goku the chance to deal the finishing blow. They claim the six-star ball and continue their journey.
52	"The Seven-Star Dragon" / "Look Out, Pan! Possessed By Qi Xing Long"; Transliteration: "Pan abune! Chii-Shinron nottote oki" (Japanese: パンあぶねぇ!七星龍のとっておき)	Kazuhito Kikuchi	Atsushi Maekawa	Tadayoshi Yamamuro	July 9, 1997	October 30, 2004
Goku, Pan, and Giru locate the seven-star dragon, Naturon Shenron. He is creating earthquakes by digging holes in the ground, and he isn't interested in fighting. Goku and Pan follow him while he's digging and see that he's headed for a city. The dragon creates a massive earthquake, but Pan and Goku as a Super Saiyan 4 are able to prevent the city from being damaged. Naturon gets angry with them and after revealing that he was created by the wish to revive all innocents killed by Majin Vegeta on the day of Majin Buu's resurrection. Naturon tries to fight but ends up hitting himself with his own attack. Goku prepares to deal the final blow, but Naturon dies on its own. Goku powers down and Pan catches the seven-star ball, only to find that it still has cracks in it. The seven-star ball begins to glow and Pan gets sucked into it. Naturon reveals that he uses a hosts body to form his own. He was using a mole's body, which is why he was so weak, but now he is using Pan's body, which means he is far more powerful. He wants to get Goku's Super Saiyan 4 body, but Goku refuses to power up. He says that he'll fight if Naturon releases Pan.
53	"Saying Goodbye" / "Pan Dies!? A Tearful 10-Fold Kamehameha"; Transliteration: "Pan ga shōmetsu!? Namida no 10-bai Kamehameha" (Japanese: パンが消滅!?涙の10倍かめはめ波)	Mitsuo Hashimoto	Toshinobu Ooi	Masayuki Uchiyama	July 16, 1997	November 6, 2004
Naturon begins destroying the city. Inside of him, Pan can't take the destruction, so she telepathically pleads with Goku to fight. He realizes that it is the right thing to do, so he reluctantly transforms into a Super Saiyan 4. Intending to kill Naturon, along with Pan, he hits Naturon with a Kamehameha wave. The dust clears, and Naturon is still alive. Goku couldn't bring himself to put all of the necessary energy into the blast. Naturon turns the tide of the fight and appears to knock Goku out. He mockingly "grants Goku's wish" by letting him see Pan one last time. He pushes Pan halfway out of him, and Goku grabs her and pulls her out. Naturon regresses to his normal form, and Goku destroys him. They claim the seven-star ball and continue their journey.
54	"The Four-Star Dragon" / "6000 Degree Celsius Power! The Warrior of the Sun"; Transliteration: "Sesshi Rokusen-do no pawā! Taiyō no Senshi" (Japanese: 摂氏6000度のパワー!太陽の戦士)	Yoshihiro Ueda	Toshinobu Ooi	Noboru Koizumi	August 6, 1997	November 13, 2004
The sun seems unusually hot, and they discover that it is because of the four-star dragon, Nuova Shenron, who reveals that he was created when Demon King Piccolo wished to regain the eternal youth and full power. He can raise his body temperature to even greater levels than the surface of the sun, which makes punching him out of the question. Goku is forced to run from Nuova. He realizes that he can still use energy waves, so he begins attacking Nuova. After a while, Nuova gets tired of playing around and he changes into his final form. Goku follows suit, and transforms into a Super Saiyan 4.
55	"The Heart of the Prince" / "Bulma's On the Job! The Vegeta-Remodeling Plan"; Transliteration: "Buruma ugoku! Bejīta Kaizō keikaku" (Japanese: ブルマ動く!ベジータ改造計画)	Yoshihiro Ueda	Atsushi Maekawa	Masayuki Uchiyama	August 13, 1997	November 20, 2004
Vegeta tries to leave for the fight to join Goku and the others, but Bulma convinces him to stay. She says that she's working on something that will help him. While she's preparing the device, Vegeta reminisces about Goku in the past; everything from their first fight when he was once evil (though he was still good in the present), to Goku's fight with Frieza when he first transformed into a Super Saiyan, to their fight when he was Majin Vegeta (half evil and half good), to their fight with Kid Buu. Bulma then explains how Goku became Super Saiyan 4 in the fight against Baby on the Tuffle planet: when Goku looked at the Earth from the Tuffle planet as if it were a full moon, he transformed into a Golden Great Ape because the Blutz Waves he absorbed were naturally being created by the Earth, in the same way as if they only reflect from the moon. Pan helped him become conscious of himself, and this made him transform into Super Saiyan 4. Since Vegeta is already conscious of himself as a regular Great Ape, theoretically he just needs to be bombarded with Blutz Waves to make the transformation to Golden Great Ape and then he can become a Super Saiyan 4. Bulma hypothesizes that Vegeta didn't transform into a Super Saiyan 4 while Baby was possessing him as a Golden Great Ape because Vegeta wasn't conscious. To create these Blutz Waves, Bulma has built a mobile version of the machine that she built for Baby on the Tuffle planet while she was possessed by one of Baby's parasitic offspring.
56	"The Three-Star Dragon" / "After the Sun Comes the Freeze! The Fire and Ice Dragon Brothers"; Transliteration: "Taiyō no tsugi wa gokkan! Honō to Kōri no kyōdai ryū" (Japanese: 太陽の次は極寒!炎と氷の兄弟龍)	Kazuhito Kikuchi	Atsushi Maekawa	Takeo Ide	August 20, 1997	November 27, 2004
Goku and Nuova begin to fight in earnest. Goku catches Nuova off guard, but grants him a freebie because Nuova spared Pan's life at Goku's request when he could have easily destroyed her. Nuova says that he doesn't harm innocent and helpless people. As they continue to fight, a beam comes out of nowhere and hits Goku's arm, freezing it. It came from Eis Shenron, the three-star dragon and Nuova's twin brother, who was (as revealed in Dragon Ball GT Perfect Files) brought forth by the wish that erased the memories of Majin Buu from everyone on Earth excluding the Z Fighters and their friends. Eis has taken the Dragon Balls from Pan, and he gives them to Nuova. He then freezes the rest of Goku. Eis commands Nova to finish Goku off, but Nuova refuses because Goku can't defend himself. Eis beats up Nuova, and reissues his command. Nuova appears to obey, but his attack just melts the ice. Goku thanks Nuova, and promises to beat Eis in ten seconds.
57	"The One-Star Dragon" / "An Overwhelmingly Strong Enemy!! The Ringleader of the Evil Dragons"; Transliteration: "Tsuyosa Attō Teki!! Jaaku Ryū o shihai suru ryū" (Japanese: 強さ圧倒的!!邪悪龍を支配する龍)	Takahiro Imamura	Atsushi Maekawa	Kazuya Hisada	September 3, 1997	December 4, 2004
Goku and Eis begin to fight. When the battle is in Goku's favor, Eis resorts to dirty tricks, such as using the unconscious Pan and even his own brother as human shields. Eis freezes him again, but Goku is able to break free, and he beats the dragon. As Eis is begging for mercy, he suddenly slashes Goku's eyes, blinding him. Goku is able to quickly land a devastating Dragon Fist, which finishes off Eis. Nuova hands Goku special eye drops to cure his blindness, but they are shot out of his hand. It was the one-star dragon, Syn Shenron, who was created (also revealed in Dragon Ball GT Perfect Files) by the wish that revived all victims of Frieza and his men. He quickly destroys Nuova, leaving only a blind Goku to fight him. An enraged and disgusted Goku criticizes him for killing one of his own kind, but Syn merely reminds him that Goku is responsible for the birth of all Shadow Dragons because he overused the Dragon Balls. Undaunted, Goku states that he always used the Dragon Balls for the good of the Earth and never used them selfishly even once. Goku tries to fight, but even when he lands a Kamehameha wave, he isn't able to do any damage to Syn. Syn lands a powerful hit, which knocks Goku unconscious. Pan regains consciousness, and is horrified to see Goku hanging upside-down from a fairground tower.
58	"Shadow Dragons Unite" / "Time to Strike Back! Surpassing Super Saiyan 4"; Transliteration: "Hangeki Kaishi! Sūpā-saiyajin 4 o koero" (Japanese: 反撃開始!スーパーサイヤ人4を超えろ)	Mitsuo Hashimoto	Toshinobu Ooi	Masayuki Uchiyama	September 10, 1997	December 11, 2004
Goku reverts to his base state and child self, and Syn grabs his unconscious body and drops him, intending to have him impaled on a statue of a swordsman. However, at that moment, Goten, Gohan, Trunks and Majuub save him, and Mr. Satan, Chi-Chi and Videl also show up for support. While Majuub tries to hold off Syn, Gohan, Goten and Trunks give all of their power to Goku. Goku absorbs more power than even he thought possible can transform into Super Saiyan 4 and even though he's still blind, he can perfectly sense Syn's movements. Syn can't even land a punch. Goku fires a Kamehameha wave at Syn, seemingly killing him. Syn reappears, having dodged the blast. He sucks up the other six Dragon Balls which were scattered around the area and he transforms into the super one-star dragon, Omega Shenron.
59	"Super Saiyan 4 Vegeta" / "Friend Or Foe?... Giant Ape Vegeta on the Rampage"; Transliteration: "Teki-ka mikata-ka... Ōzaru bejiita Ō Abare" (Japanese: 敵か味方か...大猿ベジータ大暴れ)	Yoshihiro Ueda	Toshinobu Ooi	Tadayoshi Yamamuro	September 17, 1997	December 18, 2004
Omega blasts everyone except Goku away. Goku counterattacks, but he was not able to inflict any damage at all. Omega retaliates by using the powers of the four, three, six, and five star dragons. At this point, Goku, whose vision has been restored, blasts a Kamehameha x10 at Omega, who was taken by surprise and seemingly destroys him with a Dragon Fist. However, he regenerates back to normal using the power of the five-star dragon. Omega's power has far surpassed Goku's Super Saiyan 4 power and Goku is no longer a match for him. Desperate, Goku grabs Omega. He begins to self-destruct like Vegeta did with Buu, but Vegeta arrives and tells him not to. He knows firsthand that self-destruction doesn't work. Bulma arrives with the Blutz Wave Generator and she blasts Vegeta with it. Vegeta transforms into a Great Ape and it seems like he has lost control of himself, but he quickly becomes conscious by Goku's actions. He then transforms into a Golden Great Ape and finally a Super Saiyan 4, but even teaming up with Goku won't be enough to defeat Omega. He suggests that he and Goku make the fusion.
60	"Super Saiyan 4 Gogeta" / "Fu--sion!! The Ultimate Super Gogeta"; Transliteration: "Fyū-jon!! Kyuukyoku no Sūpā Gojīta" (Japanese: フュージョン!!究極のスーパーゴジータ)	Kazuhito Kikuchi	Atsushi Maekawa	Yūji Hakamada	October 22, 1997	January 1, 2005
Omega realizes that Goku and Vegeta have a plan, so he rushes in to stop them. Gohan, Goten and Trunks cut him off to buy their fathers some time. While they hold Omega off, Goku and Vegeta fuse. They are now Super Gogeta 4 and are far more powerful than Omega. His punches are too fast even for Omega to see. But instead of quickly finishing the job and Gogeta toys with Omega. Furious, Omega unleashes all of the Shadow Dragons's negative energy in one massive attack. Gogeta redirects the ball easily away from the Earth, and the negative energy that was enveloping the Earth dissipates. Gogeta then hits Omega with a Big Bang Kamehameha, but it doesn't quite kill him. Before Gogeta can finish him off, he splits in two again, their immense power having cut the normal fusion time in half. Six of the Dragon Balls have been dislodged from Omega's body and returned to normal, and before he can suck them all back up, Goku grabs the four-star ball.
61	"The Limits of Power" / "I won't lose!! Goku Swallows the Si Xing Qiu"; Transliteration: "Zettai Katsu zo! Suushichū o kūta Gokū" (Japanese: 絶対勝つぞ!四星球を食った悟空)	Jun'ichi Fujise; Storyboarded by : Kōzō Morishita	Atsushi Maekawa	Takeo Ide	October 29, 1997	January 8, 2005
To prevent Omega from eating the four-star ball and regain his full power, Goku eats it. Then he and Vegeta attempt to fuse again, but this time Omega knows what fusion is and stops them. Goku and Vegeta try to fuse over and over again but Omega stops them every time. He's too fast and powerful to avoid long enough to fuse. Then Goku and Vegeta use the after-image technique which distracts Omega long enough for them to do the fusion dance. However, the fusion dance doesn't work for some reason. Knowing that it won't work again, Omega lets them try one more time. This time, Goku reverts to his child self and, because he's been fighting longer than Vegeta, is out of power as Super Saiyan 4 and therefore can't fuse. Suddenly, the four-star ball appears on Goku's forehead.
62	"Rescue Goku" / "Rescue Goku!! The Last Ally Enters the Fray"; Transliteration: "Gokū o Sukue!! Saigo no Mikata Tōjō" (Japanese: 悟空を救え!最後の味方登場)	Yoshihiro Ueda	Atsushi Maekawa	Masayuki Uchiyama	November 5, 1997	January 15, 2005
The four-star ball flies out of his forehead and becomes Nuova Shenron, the four-star dragon. However, Nuova is no longer on Goku's side since he was infected with Omega's negative energy after he ate the four-star ball. Nuova kicks Vegeta aside and conjures a massive beam. Goku creates a Kamehameha wave and both he and Nuova turn and fire at Omega. After being infected with Omega's negative energy, Nuova was flooded with positive energy while inside Goku. Nuova then grabs Omega and encases the two of them in flames. The ball of fire erupts and it seems that Omega has been destroyed. But when the smoke clears, Omega is only left. Right before the explosion, Omega took cover inside of Nuova's heat-resistant body. Now Omega is at full power because he has all seven Dragon Balls inside him. To make matters even worse, Vegeta loses his power, including the Super Saiyan 4 as well and reverts to his base state, and is unable to power up to Super Saiyan 4 since Bulma's Blutz Wave Generator was destroyed by Omega.
63	"Universal Allies" / "A Miraculous Come-From-Behind Victory!! Goku Saves The Universe"; Transliteration: "Kiseki no Gyakuten Shōri!! Uchū o Sukutta Gokū" (Japanese: 奇跡の逆転勝利!!宇宙を救った悟空)	Hidehiko Kadota	Atsushi Maekawa	Kazuya Hisada	November 12, 1997	January 22, 2005
Omega has finally through playing games and creates a giant energy ball and hurls it at the Earth. Vegeta prepares to attack it, but Goku knocks him aside and tries to push it back. After a long struggle, Omega's power is extremily powerful and the ball explodes. Goku prevented the Earth from blowing up but seemingly died in the blast. Vegeta, Trunks, Gohan, and Goten all attack Omega in their Super Saiyan forms but are quickly beaten. Omega then once again floods the Earth with negative energy, and Vegeta, seeking to avenge Goku's apparent death, charges for a counterattack, only to be defeated quickly once again. Before losing consciousness, Vegeta assures him that he hasn't won yet which proves true as a still-living Goku rises from the crater, holding a Spirit Bomb. He has gathered all the energy from the Earth, but it is not big enough. He tells King Kai to ask the entire universe for power. During this time, Omega repeatedly blasts Goku, but cannot damage him, due to the immense amount of energy that Goku is now in possession of. Energy from all over the universe gathers on Earth, and the phenomenally powerful Super Ultra Spirit Bomb is completed. Omega, now fearing for his life, swallows his pride and pleads for mercy, but Goku refuses to listen and hits him with the Super Ultra Spirit Bomb, destroying him for good. After the explosion, the others find Goku lying unconscious with the Dragon Balls purified and scattered around him. Suddenly, the Dragon Balls activate on their own and the true and original Shenron himself appears.
64	"Until We Meet Again" / "Goodbye, Goku... 'Till the Day We Meet Again"; Transliteration: "Saraba Gokū... Mata Au Hi Made" (Japanese: さらば悟空...また逢う日まで)	Hidehiko Kadota; Storyboarded by : Yoshihiro Ueda	Atsushi Maekawa	Naoki Miyahara	November 19, 1997	January 29, 2005
Shenron heals Goku and explains that he can't allow anyone to overuse the Dragon Balls again, so he is leaving the Earth and taking the Dragon Balls with him, planning to return when the people of Earth learn to solve their own problems. However, he allows one last wish at Goku's request, which is to repair all damage done to Earth since the gateway to Hell was opened up by Android 17, as well as revive all the innocent people who have been killed by Super 17 and the Shadow Dragons. Just before Shenron leaves, he calls for Goku to accompany him. Goku entrusts Vegeta to take his place as Earth's savior, and as they fly away, Bulma understands everything about the Dragon Balls and reminisces about her first time meeting Goku and lifelong friendship. Goku stops by Kame House to say goodbye to Master Roshi and Krillin, who has been revived. He also stops in Hell to say goodbye to Piccolo and tells him that he will one day get back into Heaven. Unexpectedly, Pan finds Goku's clothes on the ground and Vegeta tells her to treasure them dearly before he and the other Z Fighters leave with their family and friends to their homes. As Goku lies on the back of Shenron, the seven Dragon Balls become one with Goku's body and he becomes one with Shenron as Shenron finally vanishes for good. A century later, all of the Z Fighters and allies have passed away of old age except for the now-elderly Pan. Goku Jr., Goku's descendant and Pan's grandson, and Vegeta Jr., Vegeta's descendant, are fighting in the junior division championship match at the World Martial Arts Tournament. Goku Jr. is wearing Goku's clothes that Pan preserved from long ago. Pan looks down and sees the now-adult Goku watching the fight, but when she goes down to find him, he's not there anymore; Pan merely assumes that she was imagining things. As Goku exits the stadium, he flashes back to many of the events that shaped his past from his adoption by Grandpa Gohan to Baby's defeat. With his Power Pole in hand, Goku flies off on the Flying Nimbus into the distance.

== Special ==
Title	Directed by	Written by	Animation directed by	Original release date	English air date
"Dragon Ball GT: A Hero's Legacy" Transliteration: "Gokū Gaiden! Yūki no Akashi wa Sūshinchū" (Japanese: 悟空外伝! 勇気の証しは四星球)	Yoshihiro Ueda & Hidehiko Kadota	Atsushi Maekawa	Akira Inagami	March 26, 1997	December 30, 2012
