= Dragon Ball GT =

Japanese anime television series

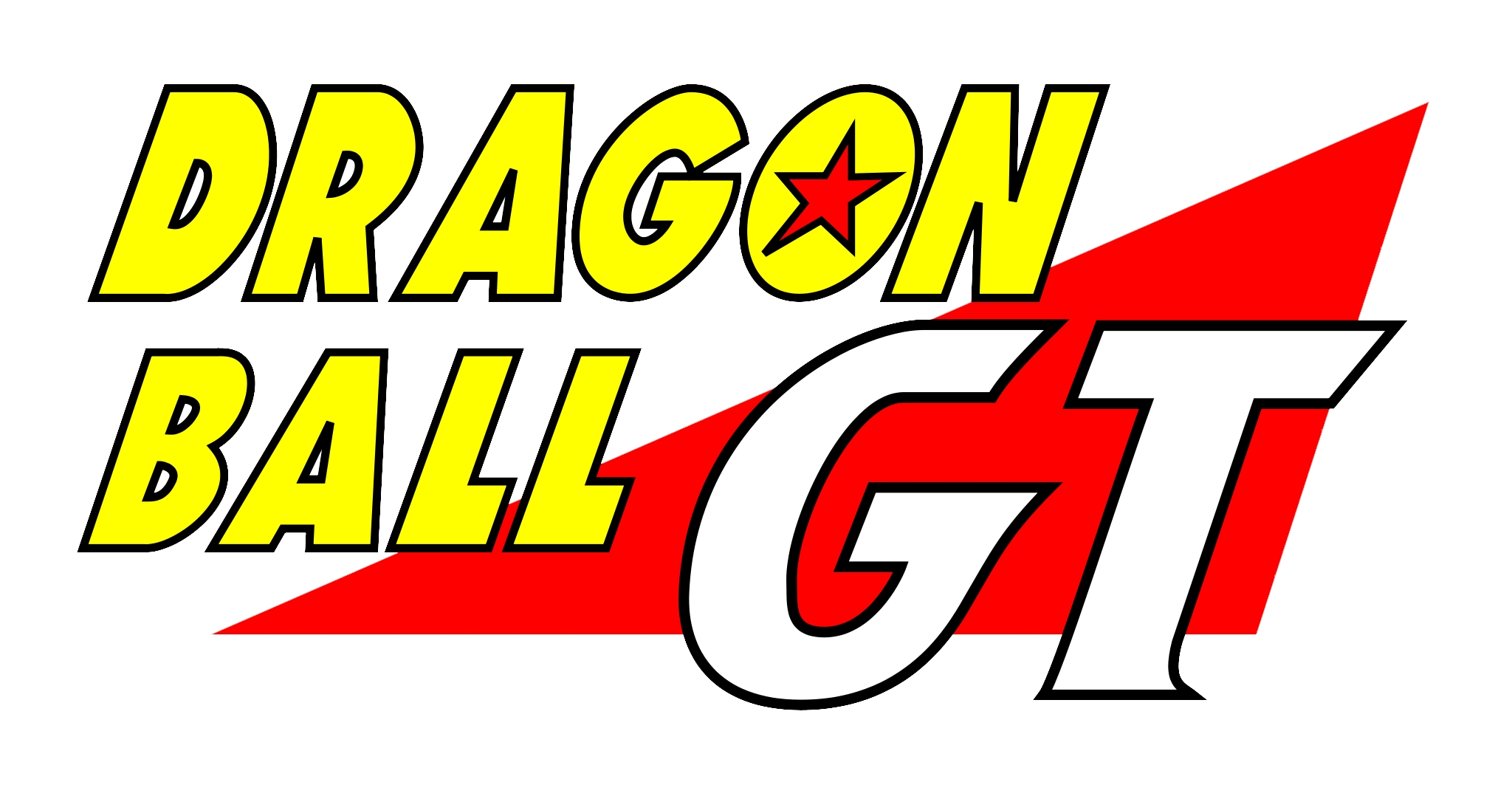
- ドラゴンボールGT; Doragon Bōru Jī-Tī
- Genre: Adventure; Fantasy comedy; Martial arts
- Based on: Dragon Ball by Akira Toriyama (Note: While based on the manga, the series serves as an anime-exclusive sequel set after the events of the work and does not adapt any published material.)
- Developed by: Aya Matsui (#1–50) (Note: Position discontinued beyond listed episodes)
- Directed by: Osamu Kasai
- Voices of: Masako Nozawa; Yūko Minaguchi; Takeshi Kusao; Ryō Horikawa; Shinobu Satouchi; Atsushi Kisaichi
- Music by: Akihito Tokunaga
- Opening theme: "Dan Dan Kokoro Hikareteku" by Field of View
- Ending theme: "Hitori ja Nai" by Deen (#1–26); "Don't You See!" by Zard (#27–41); "Blue Velvet" by Shizuka Kudo (#42–50); "Sabitsuita Machine Gun de Ima o Uchinukō" by Wands (#51–64)
- Country of origin: Japan
- Original language: Japanese
- No. of episodes: 64 (list of episodes)

Production
- Producers: Kōji Kaneda (#1–26); Seiichi Hiruta (#1–26)
- Cinematography: Sanko Production
- Editor: Shinichi Fukumitsu
- Running time: 24 minutes
- Production companies: Fuji Television; Toei Animation

Original release
- Network: Fuji Television
- Release: February 7, 1996 – November 19, 1997

Related
- A Hero's Legacy (1997); List of all Dragon Ball series; List of all Dragon Ball films

Dragon Ball GT (Japanese: ドラゴンボールGT, Hepburn: Doragon Bōru Jī-Tī) is a Japanese anime television series based on Akira Toriyama's Dragon Ball manga franchise that ran from February 1996 to November 1997. Produced by Toei Animation, the series premiered in Japan on Fuji Television and its FNS affiliates, running for a total of 64 episodes. Unlike Dragon Ball and Dragon Ball Z, the previous two television adaptations in the Dragon Ball media franchise, Dragon Ball GT does not adapt the manga. It serves as an anime-exclusive sequel to the Dragon Ball Z anime series, with an original story incorporating the same characters and universe. It follows the exploits of Son Goku, the series' main protagonist who is turned back into a child due to a Black Star Dragon Ball wish. After discovering that if they do not recollect all the balls within one year, the Earth will explode, Goku, his granddaughter Pan, and Trunks set off to traverse the universe in an attempt to find them.

Despite the series being a non-manga adaptation, franchise creator Akira Toriyama designed new characters and concepts for Dragon Ball GT. Chronologically, it is the last Dragon Ball series (taking place after Dragon Ball Z) and until the release of Dragon Ball Super (2015–2018), GT was the final televised series of the original Dragon Ball anime trilogy. Another later anime series where Toriyama was more involved in the production, Dragon Ball Daima (2024–2025), borrows several concepts featured in GT.

== Plot ==
=== Black Star Dragon Balls Saga ===
Five years after the 28th World Martial Arts Tournament (天下一武道会, Tenkaichi Budōkai; lit. 'The Number One Martial Arts Association Under the Heavens') and the end of Dragon Ball Z (changed from 5 to 10 years in the Funimation dub), Son Goku is accidentally turned back into a child by Ultimate Shenron (究極神龍, Kyūkyoku Shenron), a much more powerful red version of Shenron created by the Nameless Namekian (before he split into Kami and Demon King Piccolo) who can grant any single wish, regardless of any restrictions placed on the other dragons, summoned from the Black Star Dragon Balls (究極のドラゴンボール, Kyūkyoku no Doragon Bōru; lit. 'Ultimate Dragon Ball') by his old enemy Emperor Pilaf. He is then forced to travel across the universe to retrieve them, accompanied by his granddaughter Pan and Trunks as, if he does not retrieve them within a year, the Earth will explode. The trio goes through various adventures in their journey to find the Black Star Dragon Balls, until they encounter the artificial Tuffle parasite, Baby, who intends to destroy the Saiyan race as his revenge for their extermination of the Tuffles many years ago.

=== Baby Saga ===
After turning practically all of the Earth's population, including the Saiyans, into Neo-Tuffles, Baby decides to convert Vegeta's body into his own and use it to kill Goku. Goku fights him and is quickly defeated, but, after having his tail regenerated by Kibito Kai and Old Kai, transforms and achieves the power of Super Saiyan 4 (スーパーサイヤ人4, Sūpā Saiya-jin Fō). In this new form, Goku easily overpowers Baby before destroying the evil Tuffle by propelling him into the sun with a 10x Kamehameha (10倍かめはめ波, Jūbai Kamehameha; lit. '10-Fold Kamehame Wave'). Piccolo sacrifices himself to permanently destroy Ultimate Shenron and the Black Star Dragon Balls when the Earth explodes after Goku and the others help the people of Earth evacuate to Planet Plant, which Baby had wished back into existence using the Black Star Dragon Balls.

=== Super 17 Saga ===
A year after Baby's defeat and Piccolo's sacrifice, Dr. Myuu (Baby's creator) and Dr. Gero (creator of the Red Ribbon Army androids) create an evil replica of Android 17 (人造人間17号, Jinzōningen Jū Nana Gō; lit. 'Artificial Human #17') in Hell, and have it control the original Android 17 so that a portal from Hell to Earth opens up, leading to a mass invasion of the planet by revived villains. The original Android 17 attempts to mentally manipulate Android 18 as well, but Krillin intervenes. Enraged, 17 murders Krillin by shooting an energy beam through his heart. The two 17s then fuse into Super 17 (超17号, Chō Jū Nana-Gō), who vows to destroy all of humanity and avenge the Red Ribbon Army's defeat at the hands of Goku. Super 17 seems impervious to all of Goku's attacks, including the Super Saiyan 4's power, but when 18 attacks him to avenge Krillin's death, Goku takes advantage of the distraction to penetrate through Super 17 with his Super Dragon Fist (超龍拳, Chō Ryūken) technique, then unleashes a Rapid-Fire Kamehameha (続かめはめ波, Renzoku Kamehameha; lit. 'Continuous Kamehame Wave') that completely eradicates him.

=== Shadow Dragons Saga ===
The Dragon Balls are collected to revive those killed by Super 17, including Krillin. However, an evil black dragon emerges and then splits into seven Shadow Dragons, who set out to punish humanity for their constant misuse of the Dragon Balls by destroying the Earth. All but the most powerful and evil, Syn Shenron, are defeated by Goku and Pan. Syn Shenron appears to be losing until he absorbs the Dragon Balls and gains tremendous power, transforming into Omega Shenron and surpassing even Goku's Super Saiyan 4 power. Goku is about to sacrifice himself to destroy the Omega Shenron, but Vegeta intervenes and gains the Super Saiyan 4 transformation with help from Bulma's newest invention, the Blutz Wave Generator. Goku and Vegeta merge using the Fusion Dance technique to create Super Saiyan 4 Gogeta, who uses his immense power to beat Omega Shenron to a pulp. However, after being too confident in his ability to defeat Omega Shenron, he uses up too much time in an attempt to embarrass him. Gogeta then defuses and Goku and Vegeta revert to their Base forms. Eventually, using the energy of every living being in the universe, Goku creates the incredibly powerful Super Ultra Spirit Bomb (超ウルトラ元気玉, Chō Urutora Genki-dama; lit. 'Super Ultra Energy Sphere') and uses it to destroy Omega Shenron once and for all.

Afterward, the original Shenron appears from the purified and restored Dragon Balls to grant Goku and his friends one last wish, which they use to revive everyone killed by Super 17 and by the Shadow Dragons after Shenron informs that the Dragon Balls can no longer be used forever and then proceeds to disappear – along with Goku and the Dragon Balls. Several decades later, Goku's great-great-grandson and descendant, Goku Jr., competes in the 64th World Martial Arts Tournament against Vegeta's great-great grandson and descendant, Vegeta Jr., as the now-elderly Pan cheers him on. Pan then sees a now-adult Goku and tries to approach him, but he quickly disappears into the crowd. Goku leaves the World Martial Arts Tournament with a flashback covering all the events of his timeline. Before leaving the 64th World Martial Arts Tournament, Goku retrieves his Power Pole and rides off on his Flying Nimbus cloud, concluding the story of Dragon Ball.

== Characters ==
=== Main characters ===
==== Son Goku ====
Goku is descended from an alien warrior race known as the Saiyans, who sent him, originally named Kakarot, to Earth to prepare it for conquest.^{[ch. 197]} In the first episode, Goku is transformed back into a child by an accidental wish made by the Pilaf Gang using the Black Star Dragon Balls, setting in motion the events of the entire series. The Black Star Dragon Balls were then scattered around the whole universe in different planets after the wish making, and due to the lethal side effect of these Black Star Dragon Balls, the Earth was set to be destroyed in a year if the Balls were not collected within that period of time. Goku, his granddaughter Pan, and the son of Vegeta, Trunks, travel the universe to search for the Black Star Dragon Balls and return them to Earth to prevent its destruction. After acquiring the Super Saiyan 4 transformation, Goku battles the evil Tuffle Baby, Super 17, and the evil Shadow Dragons. His final challenge is against Omega Shenron, whom he destroys using the Super Ultra Spirit Bomb. Goku leaves with the original form of Shenron, but not before saying his goodbyes to his friends on Earth. He then appears 100 years later at the next World Martial Arts Tournament as an adult, where he watches a battle between Goku Jr., his descendant, and Vegeta Jr., Vegeta's descendant. An elderly Pan sees him, but he quickly departs. Goku is the main protagonist of Dragon Ball GT and the overall protagonist of the Dragon Ball franchise.

==== Pan ====
Pan (パン) is the granddaughter of Goku and Chi-Chi and daughter of Gohan and Videl,^{[ch. 518]} as such her ancestry comes from both humans and the extraterrestrials called the Saiyans. Pan appears as a young child in the final installments of the original manga and Dragon Ball Z anime series and is featured as one of the protagonists of the Dragon Ball GT anime series and its television special A Hero's Legacy. According to Dragon Ball GT producer Kōzō Morishita, Pan's role in the GT series was intended to be a strong but constantly imperiled character who had to be rescued by Goku, essentially a "heroine who makes Goku a hero".

In Japanese media she is voiced by Yūko Minaguchi. In the North American versions of Dragon Ball GT, she is voiced by Elise Baughman in the Funimation dub (who also voices her in Dragon Ball Kai) and by Caitlynne Medrek in the Blue Water dub. Sharon Mann voices the older version of the character in AB Groupe's English dub of the GT TV special, which was recorded in France. In the English version of Dragon Ball GT: Final Bout, she is voiced by Julie Maddalena.

==== Trunks ====
In Dragon Ball GT, Trunks' second incarnation has become the president of Capsule Corporation, but does not take the job seriously. During his time on Imecka, Trunks battles with Ledgic, but he is defeated, who after which, Goku fights him. Trunks later encounters more powerful threats, such as Luud, and General Rilldo. He is then later briefly controlled by Baby during the Baby arc, but is able to free himself from control, but not before Baby implants a mind-control seed. Trunks travels through space with Pan and a de-aged Goku in search of the Black Star Dragon Balls during the first half of the series, though his prominence in the series is reduced following the Baby arc. He also plays a very big part of giving energy to Goku to help him fight Omega Shenron.

=== Supporting characters ===
==== Vegeta ====
In the Baby arc, Vegeta is possessed by the Tuffle parasite Baby, who uses his body to fight Goku. Baby is later forced out of Vegeta's body by the Super Saiyan 4 Goku, who destroys him. In the Super 17 arc, Vegeta fights Super 17, but is defeated. In the Shadow Dragons arc, Vegeta transforms into a Super Saiyan 4 and fuses with Goku to become Gogeta, who splits before he can defeat Omega Shenron. After Goku defeats Omega Shenron and departs with the original Shenron, Vegeta advises Pan to hold on to Goku's clothes before flying away.

==== Giru ====
Giru (ギル) is a character that first appears in the 3rd episode of Dragon Ball GT. Originally known as T2006 or DB4649T2006RS, Giru is a Machine Mutant, fully mechanical beings with organic properties: they can mold, contort, and reshape themselves like organic lifeforms, absorb and integrate metallic and mechanical materials into their being, as well as restructure themselves. He is encountered by Goku, Pan and Trunks on Imecka. Giru consumes their Dragon Radar for energy in an act of desperation for survival, inadvertently integrating the Dragon Radar's functionality into his software. Giru joins Goku's group and accompanies them to various planets in the galaxy on their quest to find the Black Star Dragon Balls. Giru would become good friends with Pan in the series; however, he is frequently the recipient of abuse, both verbal and physical, at the hands of Pan, which makes him somewhat fearful of her. Giru plays a pivotal role during the group's encounter with his creator Doctor Myuu as well as the parasitic Baby on the planet M-2, and aids them in their subsequent struggle against the villains. During the Shadow Dragons arc, Giru accompanies Goku and Pan to search for the seven Shadow Dragons using his built-in Dragon Radar functionality to track the creatures. He is voiced by Shinobu Satouchi in Japanese media and by Sonny Strait in the Funimation anime dub.

==== Uub ====
Oob (ウーブ, Ūbu), known as Uub in the English anime dub, is the human reincarnation of the evil Majin Buu. In Dragon Ball Z, after Buu was destroyed, Goku asked for him to be reincarnated as a good person, so they may battle again.^{[ch. 518]} Goku eventually senses Uub's hidden power and seeks him out ten years later, when Uub attends the tournament to gain money for his village.^{[ch. 518]} Goku ends up deciding to train him to be a future defender of Earth and as an opponent that he can battle.^{[ch. 519]} During the Baby arc he would merge with the benevolent incarnation of Majin Buu (魔人ブウ(善), Majin Bū (Zen); lit. 'Demon Person Buu (Good)'), and become Super Oob (スーパーウーブ, Sūpā Ūbu) ("Majuub" in the English dub), a being powerful enough to face threats such as Baby, Super 17, and Omega Shenron. After fusing with Buu, he experiences a slight alteration of his physical appearance and gains a massive boost in power as well as new abilities such as Buu's signature ability to turn enemies into candy.

He is voiced by Atsushi Kisaichi in Japanese, by Scott Roberts and Brendan Hunter in the English Blue Water dub, and by Sean Teague in the Funimation dub.

=== Major antagonists ===
==== Doctor Myuu ====
Doctor Myuu (ドクター・ミュー, Dokutā Myū) is a recurring character that first appears in the 13th episode of Dragon Ball GT. A brilliant but mad Machine Mutant scientist, he is assisted by his enforcer General Rilldo (リルド将軍, Rirudo Shōgun) and intends to gather the Black Star Dragon Balls to complete what appears to be his ultimate creation, Baby. His plans are eventually foiled by Goku, Pan, and Trunks after they arrive on the planet M-2 and defeat most of his minions. Myuu escapes and evades Goku and his companions after Baby's apparent defeat, only to be killed when Baby suddenly emerges from his body. It is then revealed that Baby was the one who created and programmed Dr. Myuu, and not the other way around. He later joins forces with Doctor Gero while in Hell to create a duplicate of Android 17 using Myuu's machine mutant technology, who then manipulates the original Android 17 into converging their power together to open a rift between Earth and Hell, enabling him and his co-creators to escape. Android 17 and his Hell Fighter duplicate eventually fuse to become Super 17, who subsequently turns on and kills both Gero and Myuu. He is voiced by Kazuyuki Sogabe in Japanese media and Duncan Brannan in the Funimation anime dub.

==== Baby ====
Baby (ベビー, Bebī) is a character who first appears in the 22nd episode of Dragon Ball GT. He is a parasitic alien created by combining the DNA of the king of the Tuffles (ツフル人, Tsufuru-jin) with a cybernetic body. Baby desires to exterminate all of the Saiyans to avenge the extinction of his people and the loss of their homeworld to the Saiyans. Baby is first reactivated from a sleep state by Doctor Myuu. He attempts to fight Goku, Trunks, and Pan, but is easily defeated. To boost his power, Baby infects various people with his DNA and begins gathering energy from them. After a second defeat at the hands of the three Saiyans, Baby infects Trunks and travels to Earth with his unsuspecting host. On Earth, he battles Goten and Gohan, infects them both, and eventually infects Vegeta to make him his primary host. Goku, Trunks, and Pan return to Earth to find the entire population is now under Baby's control. Baby defeats Goku, and uses the Black Star Dragon Balls to restore the planet Tuffle and transport the Earth population to it. During this time, Baby evolves into an even more powerful form and defeats and eats Uub after his chocolate beam is reflected back. Goku returns for a rematch, but is swiftly defeated. This causes Goku to transform into a Golden Great Ape and then into a Super Saiyan 4. Baby then has Bulma, also under his control, fire a radiation beam at him from her Blutz Wave Generator which enables him to transform into a Golden Great Ape as well. After a lengthy battle, Goku emerges victorious with the help of Uub, who weakens Baby from inside him, and Trunks, Gohan, and Goten, who were freed from Baby's control by Kibito Kai. Baby is forced to abandon Vegeta and attempts to escape in a spaceship, vowing to return to destroy the Saiyans. However, Goku blasts the spaceship with a 10x Kamehameha attack, sending it into the sun and obliterating Baby. The character made his manga debut in the first chapter of Dragon Ball Heroes: Victory Mission in October 2012. Baby is voiced by Yusuke Numata in Japanese media and by Mike McFarland in the Funimation anime dub.

==== Super 17 ====
In the "Super 17" arc, Doctor Gero and Doctor Myuu create a machine mutant copy of Android 17 by the name of Hell Fighter 17, who is capable of mentally controlling Red Ribbon Androids like 17 and 18. Android 17 is compelled into fusing with his machine mutant replica and become the villainous Super 17. Super 17 is capable of absorbing an opponent's incoming attacks, but he is unable to move and absorb energy at the same time. Sometime after Goku kills Super 17 using the Super Dragon Fist while the latter is distracted by 18, the original Android 17 is eventually revived with the purified Dragon Balls during the series finale. He is voiced by Shigeru Nakahara in Japanese media and Chuck Huber in the Funimation anime dub.

==== Shadow Dragons ====
The Shadow Dragons, known as Evil Dragons (邪悪龍, Jaakuryū) in the original Japanese, are a group of evil beings born from the evil energy caused by overuse of the Dragon Balls in Dragon Ball GT. They are named after the One-Star through Seven-Star Dragon Balls; One-Star Dragon (一星龍, Īshinron; Chinese: Yī Xīng Lóng), Two-Star Dragon (二星龍, Ryanshinron; Chinese: Èr Xīng Lóng), Three-Star Dragon (三星龍, Sanshinron; Chinese: Sān Xīng Lóng), Four-Star Dragon (四星龍, Sūshinron; Chinese: Sì Xīng Lóng), Five-Star Dragon (五星龍, Ūshinron; Chinese: Wǔ Xīng Lóng), Six-Star Dragon (六星龍, Ryūshinron; Chinese: Liù Xīng Lóng), and Seven-Star Dragon (七星龍, Chīshinron; Chinese: Qī Xīng Lóng). In the English dubs, their names are changed to Syn Shenron, Haze Shenron, Eis Shenron, Nuova Shenron, Rage Shenron, Oceanus Shenron, and Naturon Shenron respectively.

When attempting to undo the damage caused by Super 17, a cigar-smoking Black Smoke Shenlong (黒煙の龍, Kokuen no Ryū; lit. 'Black Smoke Dragon'), named Black Smoke Shenron in the Funimation dub, is summoned from the Dragon Balls instead of the regular Shenron. He is a dragon who is formed from all the negative energy accumulated from the selfish wishes granted throughout the series using the Dragon Balls. Summoned from the same Earth Dragon Balls, he splits into seven Evil Dragons who each take the form of a tainted Dragon Ball, spreading out all over the world and proceeding to cause chaos, causing the heroes to defeat each one. Goku, Pan, and Giru manage to defeat the other dragons before encountering Eis and Nuova Shenron. Being much more honorable than his brethren, Nuova helps Goku and turns on Eis. Syn Shenron, the most powerful of the Shadow Dragons, kills Nuova before absorbing both his Dragon Ball and the others as well to increase his power and become Omega Shenron, Super One-Star Dragon (超一星龍, Sūpā Īshinron) in Japanese, with access to all of the abilities of his brethren. After a long battle, he is killed by Goku's Super Genki-Dama, and the Dragon Balls are purified.

The Shadow Dragons make their manga debut in the Jaaku Missions Saga of Dragon Ball Heroes: Victory Mission. When confronted by the Dragon Ball Heroes, Black Smoke Shenron creates Shadow GT Goku (シャドウ悟空, Shadō Gokū) to combat them. Shadow GT Goku is a replication of GT Goku created by Black Smoke Shenron as his primary method of fighting.

Daisuke Gōri voices Black Smoke Shenron in Japanese, and Christopher Sabat voices him in the Funimation dub. Syn/Omega Shenron is voiced by Hidekatsu Shibata in Japanese. Bob Carter and Christopher R. Sabat respectively voice Syn Shenron and Omega Shenron in the Funimation dub, while Victor Atelevich voices them both in the Blue Water dub.

== Production ==
Unlike the previous anime series in the Dragon Ball franchise, Dragon Ball GT does not adapt the manga series written by Akira Toriyama, but tells an original story conceived by the staff of Toei Animation using the same characters and universe from the original Dragon Ball manga and it continues the story where Dragon Ball Z had left off. Toriyama did, however, come up with the Dragon Ball GT name, which stands for "Grand Tour", in reference to the series having the characters travel through the universe, and designed the appearances of the main cast. Toriyama himself referred to GT as a "side story of the original Dragon Ball".

Chief character designer Katsuyoshi Nakatsuru said he agonized over designing Super Saiyan 4 Goku, which was the idea of the show's producers, questioning whether it was necessary to go further with the transformations. Because Super Saiyan 4 is brought about while in a Saiyan's Great Ape (大猿, Ōzaru; lit. 'Great Monkey') form, he made the hair more "wild" and covered Goku's body in red fur. There was only a single final draft of the character; although Nakatsuru did consider making the hair blond, he ended up choosing black as it provides more contrast with the red fur.

=== Music ===
The music of Dragon Ball GT was composed by Akihito Tokunaga, although the series uses five pieces of theme music by popular recording artists. Field of View performs the series opening theme, "Dan Dan Kokoro Hikareteku" (DAN DAN 心魅かれてく), which is used for all 64 episodes in Japanese. Vic Mignogna performs the English version. "Hitori Janai" (ひとりじゃない), performed by Deen in Japanese and Stephanie Young in English, is used for the ending theme for the first 26 episodes. Starting at episode 27, the series begins using Zard's "Don't You See!" for the ending theme in Japanese. Stephanie Young performed the song in English. Episode 42 marks the next ending theme change, with "Blue Velvet" by Shizuka Kudo in Japanese and Brina Palencia in English being used. "Sabitsuita Machine Gun de Ima o Uchinukō" (錆びついたマシンガンで今を撃ち抜こう), performed by Wands in Japanese and Justin Houston in English, is introduced as an ending theme in episode 51. It was used as the ending theme for the remainder of the series. The final episode reuses the opening theme as an insert song, which was omitted in the alternate soundtrack, composed by Mark Manza.

=== Localization ===
==== Funimation dub ====
When Dragon Ball GT was originally airing in Japan during 1996 and 1997, Funimation had already begun dubbing the first two seasons of Dragon Ball Z, in association with Saban Entertainment and Ocean Productions. Once Funimation completed work on Dragon Ball Z in 2003, they licensed GT for an English language broadcast in the United States. Their English dub of the series utilized a new guitar-based musical score by Mark Menza, and a new rap metal theme, titled "Step into the Grand Tour". The theme was performed by rapper Marcus Hall (known as "Shorty the Man").

The Funimation dub aired on Cartoon Network's Toonami programming block from November 7, 2003, to April 16, 2005, and had reruns outside of Toonami until June 13, 2005. Funimation decided to release the first few home video volumes several months ahead of the TV debut. Part of the reasoning behind this was so that Toonami could repeat the entirety of Dragon Ball Z in 2003 before airing the first episode of GT.

The company's original home video release and television broadcast both skipped the first 16 episodes of the series. Instead, Funimation created a composition episode entitled "A Grand Problem" which used scenes from the skipped episodes to summarize the story. The skipped episodes were later shown on Cartoon Network as "The Lost Episodes" after the original broadcast concluded. Funimation's English dub began re-airing in the US on Nicktoons from January 16 to December 13, 2012, (which also included the U.S. television premiere of Episode 16 "Giru's Checkered Past") and rerun until January 2, 2015, due to Adult Swim having air rights Dragon Ball Z Kai through Toonami. "Step into the Grand Tour" was included on the original DVD/VHS volumes by Funimation, and appeared on all TV airings on Toonami and Nicktoons. However, subsequent home video releases and streaming have excluded the song in favor of an English version of the Japanese theme. Later releases also include an audio track that combines the Funimation voices with the original Tokunaga score.

In Australia, Funimation's English dub aired on Network Ten's Cheez TV morning cartoon block from March 2004 to June 2004. It also aired concurrently on the Australian version of Toonami.

==== Blue Water dub ====
AB Groupe (in association with Chinook Animation and Blue Water Studios) produced an alternate dub for Europe and Canada and was aired on YTV and Toonami UK, which divided the episodes into two seasons. The original Japanese music composed by Akihito Tokunaga was retained in the Blue Water dub. This dub ran in the UK from March 3, 2003, on CNX until August 17, 2003. The Dragon Ball Z Ocean cast, which was used in the Funimation/Saban dub of Seasons 1–2 and the Westwood Media/AB Groupe dub of Seasons 4–9, was originally contacted to dub Dragon Ball GT as well. Due to cost-cutting measures, this never came to fruition, with dubbing being moved from Vancouver to Calgary, where Blue Water Studios was based.

The dub had a script that was independent of Funimation, with some techniques having different titles (such as "Instant Transmission", which is renamed "Instant Translocation"). The names of various characters, such as the Shadow Dragon villains, were more accurate to the Japanese version when compared to the names given by Funimation. Unlike with the Funimation dub and Japanese version, the dub utilized a real child actress for Pan.

==== AB Groupe dub ====
A third English dub exists, also produced by AB Groupe, utilizing a different French-based cast. This cast only dubbed the 1997 A Hero's Legacy special, which aired on Toonami UK in 2005. Like with the Blue Water dub, it kept the original Japanese soundtrack. The French-based English cast also dubbed most of the other Dragon Ball / Dragon Ball Z films and specials, with their dub being known by fans as the "Big Green dub", because it changed Piccolo's name to Big Green.

== Related media ==
=== Home media and streaming ===
First Dragon Ball GT DVD volume, released in Japan by Pony Canyon on February 6, 2008

In Japan, Dragon Ball GT did not receive a home video release until June 15, 2005, eight years after its broadcast. This was a remastering of the series in a single 12-disc DVD box set, that was made-to-order only, referred to as a "Dragon Box". It was released by Pony Canyon. The content of this set began being released on mass-produced individual 6-episode DVDs on August 6, 2009, and finished with the eleventh volume released on June 4, 2010.

In North America, Funimation began releasing Dragon Ball GT on both VHS and DVD in edited and uncut formats in April and September 2003, starting with episode 17, after they made their own clip show episode titled 'A Grand Problem' to bring the audience up to speed with the story. After the final fifteenth volume, they released the first 16 episodes in five "Lost Episode" volumes between July 2004 and February 2005. They then released the series in DVD box sets; the first (beginning with episode 17) in October 2005 and finished in November 2006 with the first 16 episodes as a box set. Two years later, they began releasing the series again in DVD "remastered season" sets that finally put the episodes in proper chronological order; the first on December 9, 2008, and the second on February 10, 2009. A Game Boy Advance Video cartridge containing the episodes "A Grand Problem" and "Pan's Gambit" was released on September 7, 2004, by Majesco. A complete series DVD box set including the TV special was later released on September 21, 2010. Manga Entertainment began distributing Dragon Ball GT on DVD in the UK on January 20, 2014, which were re-releases of Funimation's 2008 and 2009 sets. The first season set of Dragon Ball GT contains the first 34 episodes of the series on five discs.

The series was made available on the FunimationNow app upon its launch. In March 2022, Dragon Ball GT along with the Dragon Ball titles were transferred to Crunchyroll, a streaming service Funimation acquired a year prior.

==== DVD releases ====
Region 1 (North America) and Region 4 (Australia/New Zealand)

Individual Discs

Name	Disc #	Release date	Episodes	Saga
Reaction	1	July 13, 2004 (North America); September 24, 2004 (Australia)	1–3	Black Star Dragon Ball Saga
Rejection	2	September 7, 2004 (North America); November 18, 2004 (Australia)	4–6	Black Star Dragon Ball Saga
Ruination	3	November 23, 2004 (North America); January 12, 2005 (Australia)	7–9	Black Star Dragon Ball Saga
Conviction	4	December 14, 2004 (North America); February 24, 2005 (Australia)	10–12	Black Star Dragon Ball Saga
Activation	5	February 8, 2005 (North America); March 14, 2005 (Australia)	13–16	Black Star Dragon Ball Saga
Affliction	6	April 15, 2003 (North America); September 10, 2003 (Australia)	17–19	Baby Saga
Incubation	7	April 15, 2003 (North America); September 10, 2003 (Australia)	20–22	Baby Saga
Creation	8	June 3, 2003 (North America); November 18, 2003 (Australia)	23–25	Baby Saga
Proliferation	9	June 3, 2003 (North America); November 18, 2003 (Australia)	26–28	Baby Saga
Ramifications	10	July 15, 2003 (North America); December 5, 2003 (Australia)	29–31	Baby Saga
Preparation	11	July 15, 2003 (North America); December 5, 2003 (Australia)	32–34	Baby Saga
Annihilation	12	October 14, 2003 (North America); January 14, 2004 (Australia)	35–37	Baby Saga
Salvation	13	October 14, 2003 (North America); January 14, 2004 (Australia)	38–40	Baby Saga
Calculations	14	December 30, 2003 (North America); February 11, 2004 (Australia)	41–44	Super 17 Saga
Revelations	15	December 30, 2003 (North America); February 11, 2004 (Australia)	45–47	Super 17 Saga
Evolution	16	February 3, 2004 (North America); April 20, 2004 (Australia)	48–51	Shadow Dragon Saga
Revolution	17	February 3, 2004 (North America); April 20, 2004 (Australia)	52–54	Shadow Dragon Saga
Realization	18	March 30, 2004 (North America); June 23, 2004 (Australia)	55–57	Shadow Dragon Saga
Conversion	19	March 30, 2004 (North America); June 23, 2004 (Australia)	58–60	Shadow Dragon Saga
Generations	20	May 11, 2004 (North America); August 18, 2004 (Australia)	61–64	Shadow Dragon Saga

TV Special

Name	Release date
A Hero's Legacy	November 16, 2004 (North America); March 17, 2005 (Australia)

Season Box Sets

Name	Date	Discs	Episodes	Sagas
Season One	December 9, 2008	5	1–34	Black Star Dragon Ball/Baby Saga
Season Two	February 10, 2009	5	35–64 + TV Special	Baby Saga/Super 17/Shadow Dragon Saga/A Hero's Legacy
The Complete Series	September 21, 2010	10	1–64 + TV Special	Black Star Dragon Ball/Baby/Super 17/Shadow Dragon Saga/A Hero's Legacy

Region 2

Dragon Ball GT Set (Japan)

Name	Date	Discs	Episodes
Dragon Box GT: Dragon Ball GT DVD-BOX	February 28, 2005	12	1–64 + TV Special

Season Box Sets (United Kingdom)

Name	Date	Discs	Episodes
Dragon Ball GT Season 1	January 20, 2014	5	1–34
Dragon Ball GT Season 2	March 17, 2014	5	35–64 + TV Special
The Complete Series	December 3, 2018	10	1–64 + TV Special

=== 1997 stage show ===
In 1997, a Dragon Ball GT stage show was performed in Japan. It featured Goku, Pan, and Trunks battling against villains from the series, as well as new forms of Cell and Frieza. All actors wore large mascot costumes for the performance.

=== Art books and manga ===
There are two companion books to the series, called the Dragon Ball GT Perfect Files, released in May 1997 and December 1997 by Shueisha's Jump Comics Selection imprint. They include series information, illustration galleries, behind-the-scenes information, and more. They were out of print for many years but were re-released in April 2006 and this edition is still in print.

In 2013, an anime comic version of Dragon Ball GT, starting from the final arc, began running in Shueisha's Saikyō Jump magazine. It began serialization in the January 2014 issue, which was released on December 4, 2013. Upon completing the arc, the comic resumed by starting from the beginning of GT in June 2019.

=== Video games ===
There have been two video games produced based on Dragon Ball GT, the first being Dragon Ball GT: Final Bout in 1997 for the PlayStation, which received international releases that same year, making it the first Dragon Ball game to be released in North America. The game featured a Californian-based voice cast for the North American version, rather than the Vancouver-based Ocean cast, who were doing the original North American dub of Dragon Ball Z during 1997. The 2005 Game Boy Advance game Dragon Ball GT: Transformation was released exclusively in North America.

Characters from the series continue to be featured in video games of the franchise, including Dragon Ball Xenoverse, Dragon Ball FighterZ and Dragon Ball: Sparking! Zero.

=== Other media ===
In 2018, a new Dragon Ball anime series was created by Toei called Super Dragon Ball Heroes. It was produced to promote spin-off merchandise of the franchise, specifically the game of the same name. In the show, the main cast of characters are shown a parallel universe modelled after Dragon Ball GT, this universe's variant of Goku (known as Xenoverse Goku) emulates the Goku from the main series during the events of the Dragon Ball GT storyline, with his go-to form being that of Super Saiyan 4.

== Reception ==
The series is often considered the "black sheep" of the Dragon Ball franchise, due to the lack of involvement from series creator Akira Toriyama. In 2010, Dragon Ball: Raging Blast 2 producer Ryo Mito stated that "GT is popular with fans overseas. In Japan, it's not as popular." It was considered to be Funimation's second-biggest anime property during the 2000s, behind only Dragon Ball Z. GT's American release was labeled as "very successful" in 2005.

Jeffrey Harris from IGN called it "downright repellent," mentioning that the material and characters had lost their novelty and fun. They also criticized the GT character designs of Vegeta and Trunks as being "goofy." Anime News Network (ANN) also gave negative comments about the anime, mentioning that the fights from the series were "a very simple childish exercise" and that older fans will want to stick with other anime. The series's plot was also criticized for giving a formula that was already used in its predecessors. Although, it did call it "a fun ride when not taken very seriously."

In his 2008 Funimation season set review, Todd Douglass Jr. of DVD Talk stated that the series became the "bastard child of the series", and was "a bad idea that spawned out of someone's desire to make more money on the back of Toriyama's work." He goes on to write, "Dragon Ball GT isn't all bad. There are some nice fights scattered throughout the show and though the stories never quite reach the level we grew accustomed to in Z some of moments were entertaining enough to please Dragon Ball fans. It's just that those snippets are spread few and far between and when compared to its predecessors it comes up woefully short by all accounts."

CBR stated that the character of Pan "embraces a tomboy aesthetic and prefers fighting over other activities that might be considered more conventionally feminine", and claimed that the show "dropped the ball with [her] potential." Comicbook.com said that GT "floundered to create characters who were memorable or even likable to fans", and criticized it for making Goku become "so important to the show that former characters like Krillin, Gohan, and even Vegeta are all but forgotten."
