= List of Dragon Ball singles =

This is a list of anime songs from the Dragon Ball franchise which have been released as singles.

== TV series ==
=== Dragon Ball ===
- "Makafushigi Adventure!" (1986)
- "Romantic Ageru yo" (1986)

=== Dragon Ball Z ===
- "Cha-La Head-Cha-La" (1989)
- "Detekoi Tobikiri Zenkai Power!" (1989)
- "We Gotta Power" (1993)
- "We Were Angels" (1993)

=== Dragon Ball GT ===
- "Dan Dan Kokoro Hikareteku" (1996)
- "Hitori ja Nai" (1996)
- "Don't You See!" (1997)
- "Blue Velvet" (1997)
- "Sabitsuita Machine Gun de Ima o Uchinukō" (1997)

=== Dragon Ball Kai ===
- "Dragon Soul" (2009)
- "Yeah! Break! Care! Break!" (2009)
- "Kokoro no Hane" (2010)
- "Kuu•Zen•Zetsu•Go" (2014)
- "Dear Zarathustra" (2014)
- "Junjō" (2014)
- "Oh Yeah!!!!!!!" (2014)
- "Galaxy" (2015)
- "Don't Let Me Down" (2015)

=== Dragon Ball Super ===
- "Chōzetsu Dynamic!" (2015)
- "Hello Hello Hello" (2015)
- "Starring Star" (2015)
- "Usubeni" (2016)
- "Forever Dreaming" (2016)
- "Yokayoka Dance" (2016)
- "Chao Han Music" (2016)
- "Aku no Tenshi to Seigi no Akuma" (2017)
- "Genkai Toppa × Survivor" (2017)
- "Boogie Back" (2017)
- "Haruka" (2017)
- "70cm Shiho no Madobe" (2017)
- "Lagrima" (2018)

=== Dragon Ball Daima ===
- "Jaka Jaan" (2025)
- "Nakama" (2025)

== Video games ==
- "Kusuburu Heart Ni Hi Wo Tsukero!!" (2005)
- "Ore wa Tokoton Tomaranai!!" (2005)
- "Hikari no Sasu Mirai e!" (2008)
- "Power of Dreamer" (2009)
- "Progression" (2009)
- "Battle of Omega" (2010)

== Film ==
=== Anime ===
- "Kiseki no Big Fight" (1994)
- "Dragon Power ∞" (1994)
- "Saikyō no Fusion" (1995)
- "Ore ga Yaranakya Dare ga Yaru" (1995)
- "Hero (Kibō no Uta)" (2013)

=== Live action ===
- "Rule" (2009)
