= Elise Baughman =

American voice actress

- Born: Monroe, Louisiana, U.S.
- Education: Louisiana Tech University
- Occupations: Voice actress; television presenter; corporate spokesperson
- Agent: The Campbell Agency
- Children: 1
- Website: www.elisebaughman.com

Elise Baughman is an American voice actress who works for anime series at Funimation and New Generation Pictures. She provided voices for a number of English versions of Japanese anime series.

== Early years ==
Baughman is a native of Monroe, Louisiana. She graduated from Ouachita Parish High School and Louisiana Tech University.

== Filmography ==
=== Anime ===
Title	Role	Notes
Burst Angel	Angelique	
Case Closed	Yoko Okino	
Daphne in the Brilliant Blue	Mieko Muzuki	
Darker than Black: Gemini of the Meteor	Michiru	
Desert Punk	Mother	Episode 13
Dragon Ball GT	Pan	
Dragon Ball GT: A Hero's Legacy	Pan	
Dragon Ball Z Kai	Pan	
Fruits Basket	Momiji's Mother, Rika Aida	Episode 22
Girls Bravo	Yukina	
GunXSword	Secretary	
Hell Girl	Chiaki "Chie" Tanuma	Episode 7
Hokkaido Gals Are Super Adorable!	Mai Fuyuki	
Kamichu!	Yoko	Episode 16
Kemono Friends	Indian Elephant	
Kiddy Grade	Ricky	
Mermaid Forest	Oba-chan	
Natsume's Book of Friends	Shidahime	
Negima!	Eiko	
Possibly the Greatest Alchemist of All Time	Martha	
Sakura Taisen: Ecole de Paris	Hanabi Kitaoji	
Spiral: The Bonds of Reasoning	Sayoko Shiranagatani	
Yu Yu Hakusho	Ayame	

=== Video games ===
Title	Role	Notes
Dragon Ball Video Games	Pan	
Fullmetal Alchemist and the Broken Angel	Armony Elisestein	
