= Dragon Ball GT: A Hero's Legacy =

1997 Japanese anime television film part of the Dragon Ball franchise

- Dragon Ball GT the Movie: A Hero's Legacy
- Cover for the English DVD release

悟空外伝! 勇気の証しは四星球 (Gokū Gaiden! Yūki no Akashi wa Sūshinchū)
- Created by: Akira Toriyama
- Anime television film
- Directed by: Yoshihiro Ueda; Hidehiko Kadota
- Written by: Atsushi Maekawa
- Music by: Akihito Tokunaga
- Studio: Toei Animation
- Licensed by: AUS: Madman Entertainment; NA: Funimation; UK: Manga Entertainment
- Original network: FNS (Fuji TV)
- Released: March 26, 1997
- Runtime: 46 minutes

Dragon Ball GT: A Hero's Legacy (Note: Known in Japan as Goku's Side Story! Si Xing Qiu is a Testament to Courage (Japanese: 悟空外伝! 勇気の証しは四星球, Hepburn: Gokū Gaiden! Yūki no Akashi wa Sūshinchū)) is the only Dragon Ball GT television special, aired in Japan on March 26, 1997, between episodes 41 and 42. The events in this special are actually a prelude to events that take place at the very end of the last episode of the series.

== Plot ==
100 years after Goku defeats Baby, all of his friends and family are now deceased except for his granddaughter, Pan, who is now elderly. She has a great-great grandson (Note: The Funimation dub differs from the original Japanese release, making Pan the grandmother of Goku Jr.) named Goku Jr., who closely resembles his great-great-great-great grandfather (Note: The Funimation dub differs from the original Japanese release, making Goku the great-great grandfather of Goku Jr.) Goku, but lacks the latter's courage and fighting spirit. Pan takes Goku Jr. to the cemetery to pay their respects to her grandfather and tries to train him to be a warrior, but he has no confidence. At school, he is bullied by classmate Puck and his gang. While chastising Goku Jr for not standing up for himself, Pan faints and is hospitalized.

Goku Jr. recalls the story of the magical wish-granting Dragon Ball and hopes to use it to heal Pan. The next day, he encounters Puck and his gang and reveals to them that he is going to Mount Paozu but is ridiculed. Angry, Goku Jr. unleashes some of his power and knocks out the bullies. After following the road for hours, a truck driver gives Goku Jr. a ride but later steals his belongings when he exits the truck to relieve himself. Goku Jr. encounters Puck yet again at a roadside grocery store, who agrees to accompany him so he can watch him be eaten by a monster at Mount Paozu. To acquire supplies for the long journey, Puck steals a cart full of food from the grocery store. Goku Jr. tells Puck about his quest to heal Pan, and though Puck doesn't believe in the Dragon Balls, he decides to help on the off chance it could work, saying he admired Pan's strength.

After encountering and overcoming obstacles along the way, Goku Jr. and Puck are halted by a long wooden bridge which looks dangerously unstable. Puck crosses the bridge first, followed by Goku Jr. who crosses nervously and stumbles due to strong winds. Puck struggles to save Goku Jr., who dangles from a rope above the deep trench below. The bridge collapses, causing Puck to fall into the trench. Goku Jr. manages to cross the ravine and continues his journey alone.

After traveling another great distance, Goku Jr. encounters a hostile pig-like demon. A brown bear, thankful to Goku Jr. for helping her cub earlier, fights the demon. Goku Jr. becomes enraged and transforms into a Super Saiyan. He easily defeats the demon and passes out. When he comes to, he has no memory of the transformation. He then arrives to the summit of Mount Paozu, where he finds an old house. Inside, he discovers the four-star Dragon Ball and mistakenly believes that only one ball is needed to grant the wish. He tries and fails to make his wish to save Pan. In anger and tears, he shouts at the Dragon Ball and throws the ball away. The Dragon Ball rolls to the feet of Goku Jr.'s ancestor, the now-adult Goku, who explains that he has to collect all seven to make a wish. Goku informs his descendant that he is strong and brave despite what he thinks of himself. Suddenly, a helicopter descends with Pan and Puck inside. Goku Jr. becomes excited to see everyone alive and well, exclaiming that the Dragon Ball granted his wish. He turns to where Goku stood, and is stunned to see that he has vanished until Goku's voice tells him that it was actually his bravery that restored his grandma and Puck's life.

In a final farewell, Goku wishes Goku Jr. good luck who boards the helicopter with newfound strength and the four-star Dragon Ball.

== Cast ==
Character name (Funimation English dub name)	Japanese voice actor	English dubbing actor (Funimation, 2004)	English dubbing actor (AB Groupe)
Goku Jr.	Masako Nozawa	Stephanie Nadolny	Jodi Forrest
Pan	Yukoh Minaguchi	Elise Baughman	Sharon Mann
Puck (パック, Pakku)	Tohru Furuya	Adrian Cook	David Gasman
Gettō (ゲットー) (Susha)	Shin Aomori	Peter Mayhew	Ed Marcus
Mamba (マンバ, Manba)	Miki Itoh	Amber Cotton	Sharon Mann
Rakkaru (ラッカル) (Torga)	Kazuyuki Sogabe	Christopher R. Sabat	Paul Bandey
Demon King (妖魔王, Yōma-ō) (Lord Yao)	Ryuzaburou Ohtomo	Brice Armstrong	Paul Bandey
Goku	Masako Nozawa	Sean Schemmel	David Gasman
Bully	Unknown	Ethan Rains	Unknown
Narrator	Johji Yanami	Andrew T. Chandler	Ed Marcus

== Production ==
- Directed by Osamu Kasai.
- Written by Akira Toriyama and Takao Koyama.
- Produced by Cindy Brennan Fukunaga and Gen Fukunaga.

== Music ==
- Ending Themes: "Don't You See!" by Zard
- "Step into the Grand Tour" by Shorty the Man

== Home media ==
An English dub of the special was released on DVD by Funimation in the United States on November 16, 2004. It was re-released again on the second volume of the Funimation remastered DVDs. A second English dub that features an uncredited cast was produced by AB Groupe and aired on Toonami UK under the title Four-Star Dragonball Is the Proof of Courage.

== See also ==
- "Dan Dan Kokoro Hikareteku"
