= Hitori ja Nai (Deen song) =

Single by Deen

from the album I Wish
- Released: April 1, 1996
- Genre: Pop
- Length: 3:57
- Label: B-Gram Records
- Songwriters: Shuichi Ikemori, Tetsurō Oda

Deen singles chronology
"Love Forever" (1995)	"Hitori ja Nai" (1996)	"Sunshine on Summer Time" (1996)

"Hitori ja Nai" (ひとりじゃない; lit. 'I'm Not Alone') is the ninth single by the Japanese band Deen. It is used as the first ending song for the anime series Dragon Ball GT. It was released on Mini CD on April 1, 1996, in Japan only and peaked at number 3 on the Oricon chart. It is coupled with the song "Sunday". The song was used for the first 26 episodes of the series.

An instrumental version of the song was used in the credits of the Blue Water dub of Dragon Ball GT.

== Track listing ==
All songs were written by Shuichi Ikemori

1. Hitori ja Nai(ひとりじゃない)
  - composer: Tetsurō Oda/arranger: Hirohito Furui
2. Nichiyoubi(日曜日)
  - composer: Shuichi Ikemori/arranger: Daisuke Ikeda
3. Hitori ja Nai(ひとりじゃない) (Karaoke)
4. Nichiyoubi(日曜日) (Karaoke)
