= Don't You See! (Zard song) =

Single by Zard
- Released: January 6, 1997
- Genre: Dance-rock; new wave; power pop
- Label: B-Gram
- Composer: Seiichiro Kuribayashi
- Lyricist: Izumi Sakai
- Producer: Takeshi Hayama

Zard singles chronology
"Kokoro wo Hiraite" (1996)	"Don't You See!" (1997)	"Kimi ni Aitaku Nattara..." (1997)

"Don't You See!" is the 19th single by Japanese rock band Zard. It was released on the 8 cm CD on January 6, 1997, under B-Gram Records. The single reached the No. 1 rank first week and would go on to chart for 14 weeks, selling more than 600,000 copies. The song was written by the band's vocalist, Izumi Sakai and would serve as the second closing theme song for Dragon Ball GT. Following Sakai's death in 2007, it would be ranked as her sixth best song on the Oricon polls.

== Track list ==
No.	Title	Writer(s)	Length
1.	"Don't You See!"	Izumi Sakai (Lyrics), Seiichiro Kuribayashi (Composition), Takeshi Hayama (Arrangements)
2.	"Amidst The Times We Can't Return To" (Kaeranu Toki no Naka de (帰らぬ時間の中で))	Izumi Sakai (Lyrics), Akihito Tokunaga (Composition and arrangements)
3.	"Don't you see! (Original Karaoke)" (Don't you see! (Orijinaru Karaoke) (Don't you see! （オリジナル・カラオケ）))	Seiichiro Kuribayashi (Composition), Takeshi Hayama (Arrangements)
4.	"Amidst The Times We Can't Return To (Original Karaoke)" (Kaeranu Toki no Naka de (Orijinaru Karaoke) (帰らぬ時間の中で （オリジナル・カラオケ）))	Akihito Tokunaga (Composition and arrangements)
