= List of osteopathic colleges =

This is an international list of osteopathic schools, universities, colleges, and medical schools that award a recognized osteopathic qualification or an osteopathic medical degree. The degrees of non-medical osteopathy conferred vary widely, and include: Certificates, Diplomas (such as Diploma in Osteopathic Manual Practice - DOMP or Manual Osteopathic Therapy Diploma - MOTD), Bachelors (such as bachelor of science in osteopathy), Masters (such as master of art in Osteopathic history), Doctor of Philosophy (PhD), or Diploma in Osteopathy. These non-medical osteopathic degrees are different from an osteopathic medical degree (Doctor of Osteopathic Medicine) that are solely offered by 37 medical schools in the United States. All 37 US osteopathic medical schools are listed as medical schools in the World Directory of Medical Schools, since they confer the D.O., a medical degree in Western medicine and surgery. Currently, only graduates of American osteopathic medical colleges are considered physicians who may practice the full scope of medicine and surgery.

== Argentina ==
- Escuela Osteopática de Buenos Aires
- Osteopathic Centre for Studies in Buenos Aires and Patagonia

== Australia ==
- The Royal Melbourne Institute of Technology
- Southern Cross University
- Victoria University

== Austria ==
- Vienna School of Osteopathy

== Belgium ==
- FICO Osteopathy Academy
- International Academy of Osteopathy
- Belgium School of Osteopathy

== Brazil ==
- IDOT Instituto Docusse de Osteopatia e Terapia Manual

== Canada ==
- Canadian Academy of Osteopathy
- Canadian College of Osteopathy
- Manual Osteopathic College of Canada
- Centre Ostéopathique du Québec
- Collège d'Études Ostéopathiques
- EPOQ École Professionnelle des Ostéopathes du Québec
- Établissement d'Enseignement Supérieur d'Ostéopathie du Canada
- National Academy of Osteopathy
- Ontario Academy of Progressive Osteopathy
- Ontario School of Osteopathy
- Southern Ontario College of Osteopathy

== Croatia ==
- Hrvatska akademija osteopatije

== Finland ==
- Metropolia University of Applied Sciences
- OOKK Ortopedisen osteopatian koulutuskeskus
- Osteopatiakoulu Atlas

== France ==
- CEESO Centre Europeen d'Enseignement Superieur de l'Ostéopathie
- CIDO Centre International d'Ostéopathie
- EFSO Ecole Française Supérieure d'Ostéopathie
- ESO Ecole Supérieure d'Ostéopathie
- HOLISTÉA (ex Collège Ostéopathique Européen)
- IdHEO Institut Des Hautes Etudes Ostéopathiques De Nantes
- IFOGA Institut de Formation en Ostéopathie du Grand-Avignon

== Germany ==
- Deutsches Osteopathie Kolleg (Rohdorf, Germany)
- Still Academy
- Osteopathy Academy of Munich
- German School of Osteopathy
- International Academy of Osteopathy

== India ==
- Sri Sri University

== Ireland ==
- The Irish College of Osteopathic Medicine (ICOM)

== Italy ==
- AbeOS Abe Osteopathy School
- AIMO Accademia Italiana di Medicina Osteopatica
- AOI Advanced Osteopathy Institute
- CIO Collegio Italiano Osteopatia
- CROMON Centro Ricerche Olistiche per la Medicina Osteopatica e Naturale
- CSdOI Centro Studi di Osteopatia Italiano
- CSOT Centro Studi di Osteopatia Tradizionale
- EIOM European Institute for Osteopathic Medicine
- ICOM International College of Osteopathic Medicine
- ISO Istituto Superiore di Osteopatia
- SOMA Istituto Osteopatia Milano
- SSOI Scuola Superiore di Osteopatia Italiana

== New Zealand ==
- Ara Institute of Canterbury

== Netherlands ==
- Osteopathie College Sutherland
- International Academy of Osteopathy

== Norway ==
- Kristiania University College

== Poland ==
- Akademia Osteopatii
- FICO-MUM

== Russia ==
- Институт остеопатии Санкт-Петербурга
- Russian Academy of Osteopathic Medicine
- Russian School of Osteopathic Medicine
- Проект Остеопрактика
- V. Andrianov Institute of Osteopathic Medicine

== Spain ==
- ECO Escuela del Concepto Osteopático
- EOB Escola d'Osteopatia de Barcelona
- EOM Escuela de Osteopatía de Madrid
- FBEO Formación Belga Española de Osteopatía
- NUMSS National University of Medical Sciences NUMSS is not recognized as an officially accredited university or medical school under the Spanish governmental higher education system overseen by ANECA:

National Agency for Quality Assessment and Accreditation

NUMSS instead references private/non-governmental accreditation bodies: https://www.numss.com/numss-spain-is-an-accredited-online-university-in-spain/

Additional concerns regarding misleading representation of osteopathic credentials were publicly referenced by the American Osteopathic Association:

https://thedo.osteopathic.org/2018/10/fake-do-in-massachusetts-investigated-agrees-to-stand-down/

== Sweden ==
- Skandinaviska Osteopathögskolan

== Ukraine ==
- East-European School of Osteopathy

== United Kingdom ==
- British College of Osteopathic Medicine
- College of Osteopaths
- European School of Osteopathy
- London School of Osteopathy
- Plymouth Marjon University
- Swansea University
- University College of Osteopathy

== United States ==
There are 42 osteopathic medical schools in the United States, which train "osteopathic physicians". Osteopathic physicians are fully qualified medical doctors holding the Doctor of Osteopathic Medicine (DO) degree, and they are licensed to perform surgery and prescribe medications in addition to osteopathic manual treatment. Osteopaths from any schools outside of the country are not permitted to practice in the U.S. as osteopathic physicians. The foreign-trained osteopaths, however, are permitted to practice as osteopathic manual practitioners. These manual osteopaths are permitted only to use manual techniques and may not perform surgery nor prescribe medications.

- A.T. Still University, with a Kirksville, Missouri campus and an Arizona campus
- Alabama College of Osteopathic Medicine
- Arkansas College of Osteopathic Medicine
- Burrell College of Osteopathic Medicine
- California Health Sciences University College of Osteopathic Medicine (CHSU-COM)
- Campbell University School of Osteopathic Medicine
- Des Moines University
- Duquesne University College of Osteopathic Medicine
- D'Youville University College of Osteopathic Medicine
- Edward Via College of Osteopathic Medicine, with Auburn, Virginia, Carolinas and Louisiana campuses
- Idaho College of Osteopathic Medicine (ICOM)
- Kansas City University of Medicine and Biosciences, with campuses in Kansas City and Joplin
- Lake Erie College of Osteopathic Medicine, with campuses in Bradenton, Florida, Erie, Pennsylvania, and Elmira, New York
- Liberty University
- Lincoln Memorial University, with campuses in Harrogate and Knoxville
- Marian University College of Osteopathic Medicine
- Michigan State University College of Osteopathic Medicine with campuses in East Lansing, Clinton Township and Detroit
- Midwestern University, with campuses in Chicago and Arizona
- New York Institute of Technology College of Osteopathic Medicine with campuses in New York and Arkansas
- Noorda College of Osteopathic Medicine
- Nova Southeastern University College of Osteopathic Medicine, with campuses in Fort Lauderdale and Clearwater, Florida
- Ohio University Heritage College of Osteopathic Medicine, with campuses in Athens, Dublin, Cleveland
- Oklahoma State University Center for Health Sciences, with campuses in Tulsa and Tahlequah
- Pacific Northwest University of Health Sciences
- Philadelphia College of Osteopathic Medicine, with campuses in Philadelphia and Georgia
- Rocky Vista University, with campuses in Colorado and South Utah
- Rowan-Virtua School of Osteopathic Medicine
- Sam Houston State University College of Osteopathic Medicine
- Touro College of Osteopathic Medicine – New York City and Middletown
- Touro University California
- Touro University Nevada
- University of New England College of Osteopathic Medicine
- University of North Texas Health Science Center
- University of Pikeville College of Osteopathic Medicine
- University of the Incarnate Word School of Osteopathic Medicine
- West Virginia School of Osteopathic Medicine
- Western University of Health Sciences, with a California campus and an Oregon campus
- William Carey University

Recently added:

- Baptist Health Sciences University College of Osteopathic Medicine - Memphis, Tennessee (2021, Private)
- Kansas Health Science Center–Kansas College of Osteopathic Medicine - Wichita, Kansas (2021, Private)
- Orlando College of Osteopathic Medicine - Winter Garden, Florida (2023, Private)
- Touro University Montana College of Osteopathic Medicine - Great Falls, Montana (2023, Private)
- Duquesne University College of Osteopathic Medicine - Pittsburgh, Pennsylvania (2024, Private)

== See also ==
- Osteopathy
- Doctor of Osteopathic Medicine
