= Walter Schultheiß =

German actor, author and painter (1924–2025)

- Born: 25 May 1924; Tübingen, Württemberg, Germany
- Died: 22 December 2025 (aged 101); Wildberg, Baden-Württemberg, Germany
- Occupation: Actor
- Years active: 1947–2025
- Spouse: Trudel Wulle (m. 1950; died 2021)
- Children: 1

Walter Schultheiß (25 May 1924 – 22 December 2025) was a German actor, author and painter.

== Early life and career ==
Schultheiß began his career in 1947 as Pedro del Vegas in the operetta Maske in Blau. He became famous in 1963 through his street sweeper skits at the former Süddeutscher Rundfunk, in which he and Werner Veidt entertained radio listeners every Saturday for 20 years: as the street sweeper duo Karle and Gottlob. He was heard and seen in other sketches, and radio plays with Oscar Heiler, Oscar Müller, Willy Seiler, Georg Thomalla and Willy Reichert.

He was involved in television films and family series such as Oh God, Herr Pfarrer, Der König von Bärenbach, as the pious parish councilor Karl Engstinger in Pfarrerin Lenau and as the winery owner Der Eugen. Even in old age, Schultheiß was still regularly on the theater stage for several weeks at the Komödie im Marquardt in Stuttgart. From 2000 to 2007 he played the supporting role of the upper-class landlord Rominger in the SWR crime scene in Stuttgart (Ernst Bienzle). In 2009 he took part in the Swabian mini-series Laible und Frisch. In addition to acting, Schultheiß wrote humorous dialogues, poems and valentines.

== Personal life and death ==
On 25 May 1950, Schultheiß married actress Trudel Wulle (1925–2021); in 1955 their son was born. The couple lived in Wildberg.

Schultheiß turned 100 on 25 May 2024, and died on 22 December 2025, at the age of 101.

== Filmography ==
- 1964–1966: Schwäbische Geschichten
- 1975: Abenteuerlicher Simplizissimus
- 1977: Tatort: Himmelblau mit Silberstreifen
- 1979: Das tausendunderste Jahr
- 1981/82: Augsburger Puppenkiste – Hippo und der Süßwasserkarl (Stimme von Hippo)
- 1983: Köberle kommt
- 1983: Tatort: Mord ist kein Geschäft
- 1984: Augsburger Puppenkiste – Das Tanzbärenmärchen (Stimme von Atta Troll)
- 1985: Die Schwarzwaldklinik – Die Wunderquelle
- 1986–1990: Der Eugen
- 1988: Oh Gott, Herr Pfarrer
- 1990: Pfarrerin Lenau
- 1991: Tassilo – Ein Fall für sich
- 1992: Der König von Bärenbach
- 1994–1998: Hallo, Onkel Doc!, Folgen 1–75 als Albert Kampmann
- 1995: Drei Tage im April
- 1995: Tatort: Bienzle und der Mord im Park
- 1996: Reise nach Weimar
- 2000–2007: Tatort (Fernsehreihe)
- 2006: Ein Fall für B.A.R.Z. (2. Staffel, 13 Folgen)
- 2007: Ein Fall für B.A.R.Z. (3. Staffel, 13 Folgen)
- 2008: Der Heckenschütze
- 2008–2012: Der Schwarzwaldhof (Fernsehfilm-Reihe)
- 2009/2010: Laible und Frisch – Liebe, Brot & Machenschaften
- 2013: Global Player – Wo wir sind isch vorne
