= Stuart Wolfe =

British actor

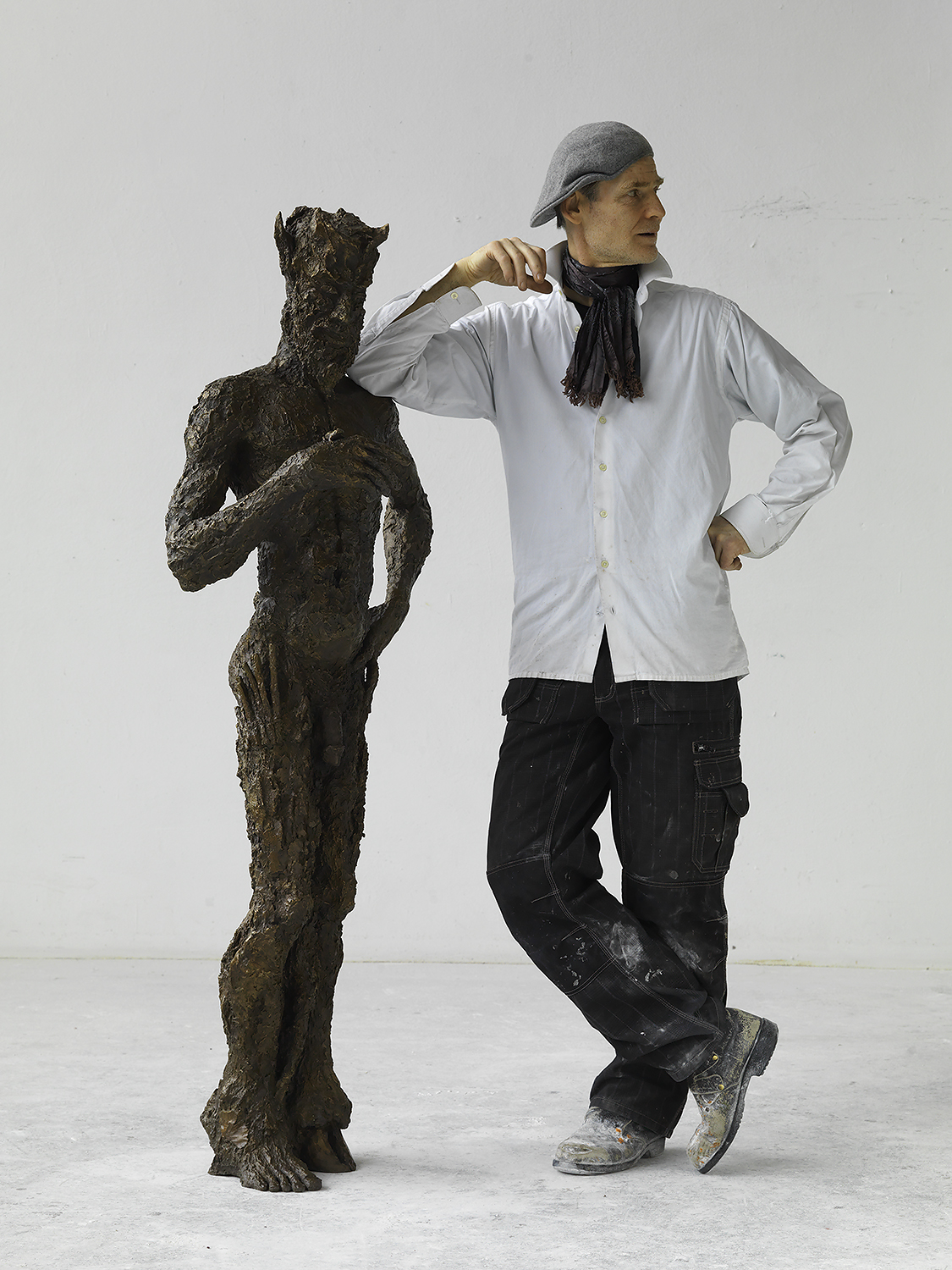
The artist in the foundry with his bronze figure Pan.

Stuart Nigel Reid Wolfe (born in London) is a British actor, circus acrobat, sculptor, painter and designer who lives and works in Berlin, Germany. Wolfe is known for his political and mythological bronze sculptures as well as bronze furniture series. His sculptures Figuren gegen das Vergessen ("statues against forgetting") were permanently installed at the memorial centre Mahn- und Gedenkstätte Ravensbrück of the former concentration camp near Berlin in 2006.

== Life ==
Stuart Wolfe spent his early childhood in London, for job-related reasons the family relocated several times to different countries. In 1961 the family moved to West Berlin where Wolfe attended the German-American Community School. In 1963 during the visit of the US President John F. Kennedy and after his famous speech Ich bin ein Berliner ("I am a citizen of Berlin"), the school's name was changed to John F. Kennedy School. Wolfe remembers shaking hands with the President on this occasion.

After an interlude in Bangalore, India from 1968 to 1970, where he attended the Bishop Cotton Boys' School, Wolfe returned to Berlin and the John F. Kennedy School, graduating in 1975 with the High school diploma.

That same year, Wolfe began working at the Schiller Theater and the Schlosspark Theater in Berlin as a stagehand and dresser. In 1976 he spent several months jobbing in New York City and New Jersey. From 1977 to 1978 he lived in France, where he spent seven months earning a living playing music on the streets of Paris. He also travelled to Israel and various countries in Africa before returning to London, where he completed his A-Levels and began his training as an actor at the Mountview Academy of Theatre Arts. And in 1979 his son was born.

Wolfe continued his acting training in Berlin by taking private lessons with Else Bongers and Otto Sander from the Schaubühne theatre. In addition, he attended the circus and acrobat school with the teacher Pepe Angoly Ott at the Tempodrom directed by Irene Moessinger. At the same time, Wolfe gained his first experience as an actor in theatre, film and television. From 1983 to 1988 he played in five movie and TV productions.

To obtain more financial independence he launched a second career in 1983 training as a physiotherapist at the Oskar-Helene-Heim, an orthopedic hospital in Berlin. He later specialised as an osteopath with the IAO. Both disciplines complemented his art work in granting him a profound insight into human anatomy. He continued practicing part-time until 2014.

From 1986 on, Wolfe began pursuing his lifelong passion for sculpting, painting and design more intensely. His mother, who had studied stage and costume design, encouraged his early interest in drawing and painting. As an autodidact, Wolfe found his own way into sculpting, being inspired by various sculptors (notably Alberto and Diego Giacometti et al.). He often visited the sculptor Waldemar Otto in his studio, that eventually became Wolfe's first own studio. Wolfe modelled his early figures in clay. Later he was introduced into different casting processes at the Berlin-based art foundry Hermann Noack, which lead to his modelling in plaster of Paris and casting in bronze.

In the tradition of his grandfather, a handicraft and design enthusiast, Wolfe also turned his attention to furniture and other objects, establishing his own label stw-design for his upcycling design work in 2016.

Since 1987 Wolfe has repeatedly travelled the world to exchange ideas with other artists. Between 1990 and 1995 his works were shown in a number of international exhibitions. In 1996 he was invited to several European countries to present his Figuren gegen das Vergessen as a travelling exhibition at different Holocaust memorial sites.

He has had solo exhibitions in France and Italy and worked on other memorial projects in Sachsenhausen. In 2003 he was given an Artist-in-residence and a teaching assignment for fine art and drama at the Berlin British School. Wolfe also founded and ran the gallery sleeping dogs in Berlin near Checkpoint Charlie for a number of years.

In 2004 and 2005 Wolfe conceptualised various large scale art projects and installations in cooperation with architects and other artists in Berlin. Since 2006 he has concentrated on developing his bronze sculpting and furniture design.

Some of Wolfe's more renowned art and design works were presented in 2014 and 2015 at art trade fairs in Geneva, Berlin and Paris, among them the French Maison & Objet. In 2017 and 2018 private commissions from various European art collectors have further advanced his artistic reputation. Wolfe continues to refine his sculpting and drawing style at his Berlin-based studio.

== Theatre (selection) ==
- 1981: title role in Klotzkopf ("Blockhead"; author and director: Chris Kurbjuhn) at the Junges Theater Berlin
- 1981: lead role in The Life in My Hands (by Peter Ustinov, director: Horst Frank) on tour through Germany
- 1982: role of Damis in Tartuffe (by Molière, director: Kurt Hübner) in the Freie Volksbühne Berlin
- 1982 role of Masham in The Glass of Water (by Eugène Scribe, director: Helmuth Froschauer) with Herbert Bötticher in the Komödie im Marquardt, Stuttgart
- 2023/24: various roles and instruction at the inclusion theatre workshop at NHU (Nachbarschaftshaus Urbanstraße), Berlin-Kreuzberg, May 2023 to February 2024

== Filmography (selection) ==
=== Cinema ===
- 1983: one of the two lead roles in the sociocritical film Eine Liebe wie andere auch ("A love like any other" by Hans Stempel and Martin Ripkens), with the world premiere at the International Forum for New Cinema during Berlin International Film Festival and viewing at the Chicago International Film Festival.
- 1984 in the Japanese-German coproduction Races (by Masato Harada) alongside Hiroyuki Watanabe, Leslie Malton, Claus Theo Gärtner, Deborah Sasson, Dean Reed and Patrick Stewart

=== Television (selection) ===
- 1984: The Cold Room with George Segal
- 1987: in the episode Von Frau zu Frau of the TV-series Alles aus Liebe ("From woman to woman: All for love") with Simone Rethel, Susanne Uhlen and Heiner Lauterbach
- 1989: in the German thriller Zugzwang by and with Mathieu Carrière and World Chess Champion Anatoli Karpow

== Work as a sculptor and painter ==
=== Oeuvre (selection) ===
==== Fine arts ====
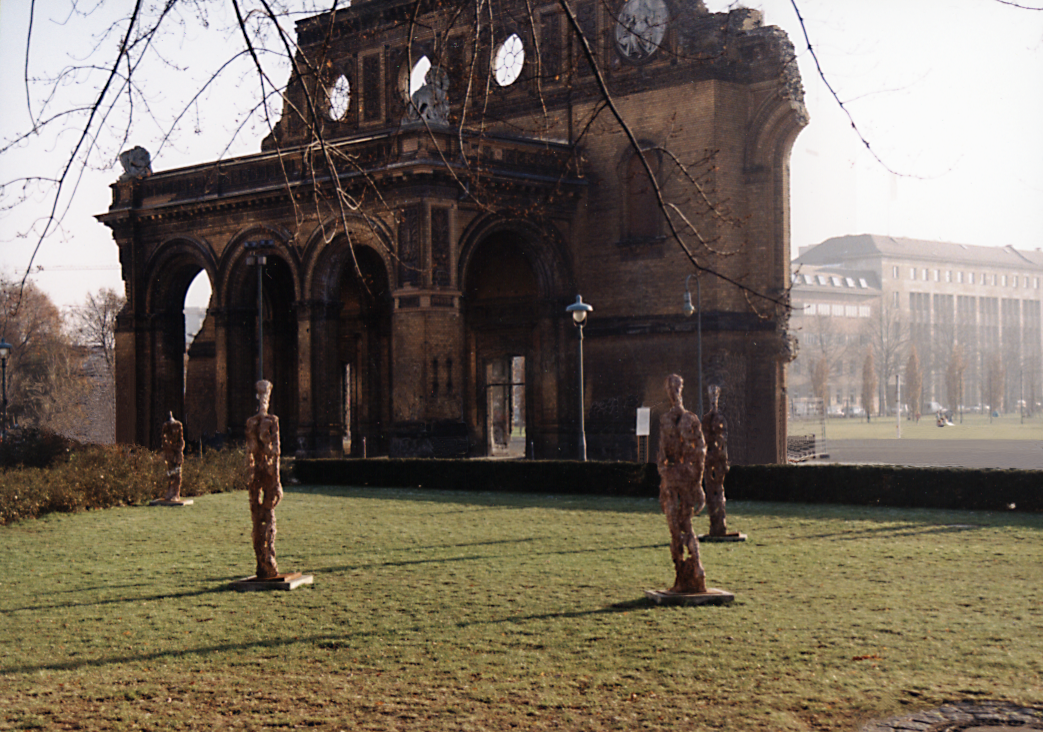
"Statues against forgetting" nearby Anhalter Bahnhof

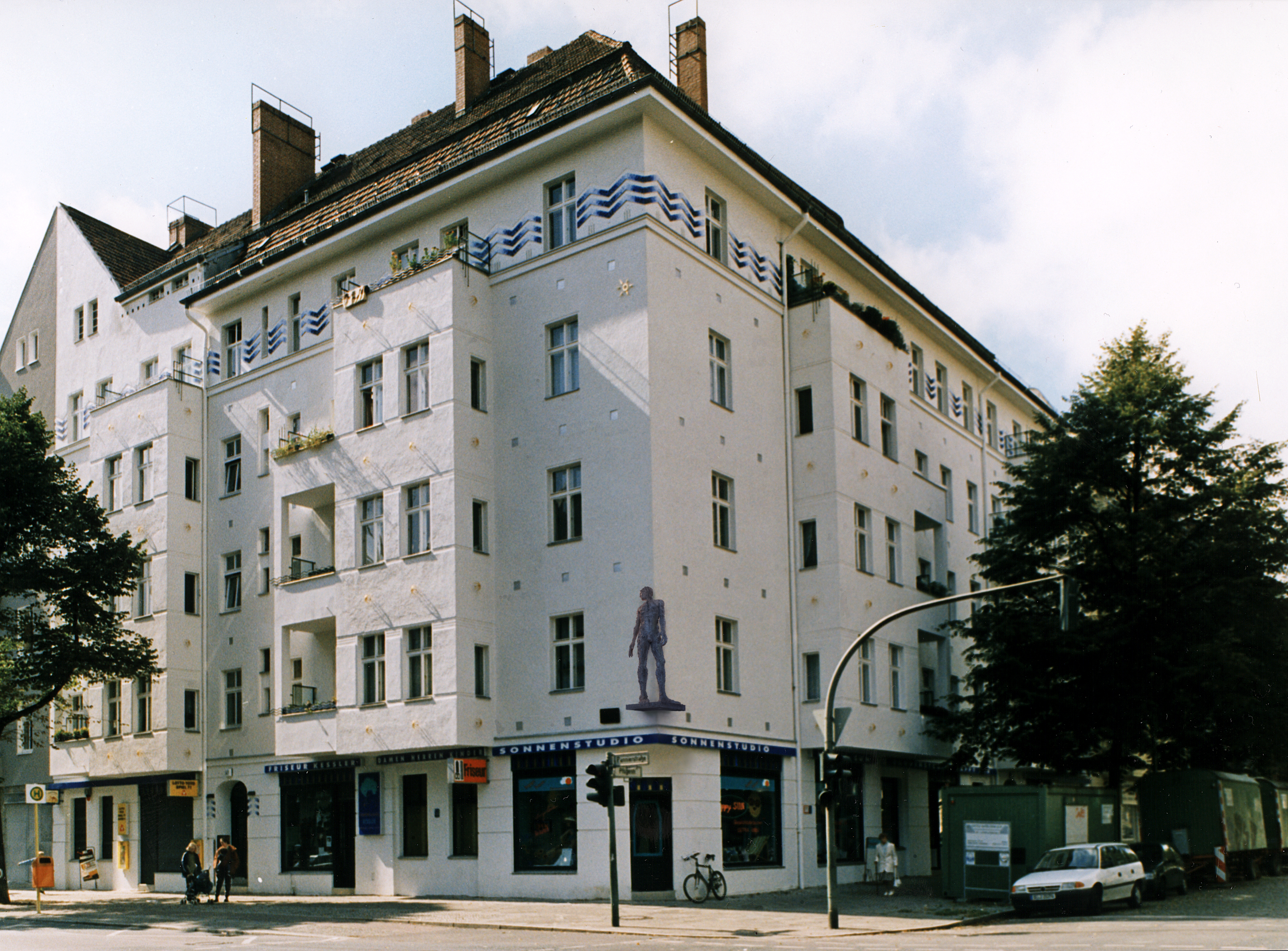
Ornamentation and figure by Stuart Wolfe on the facade of the residential building at 41, Pannierstrasse, Berlin

- 1993: Graphic series Taurus & Equus
- 1995: Figuren gegen das Vergessen ("statues against forgetting") – Installation of 17 larger-than-life sculptures at Anhalter Bahnhof Berlin as a Holocaust memorial, opened by the director of the Stiftung Deutsches Technikmuseum Berlin
- 1997–1999: Grey Man II – sculpture in the garden of the house Am Priesterberg 10 in 13465 Berlin (architect: Oliver Collingnon)
- 1997–1999: Artistic design for the house Pannierstrasse 41 in 12047 Berlin (architect: Holger Schweitzer)
- 1997–1999: Artistic figuration of the memorial site in the former Außenlager Klinkerwerk – youth project Sachsenhausen in collaboration with the Louise Henriette-Gymnasium and the Stiftung Brandenburgische Gedenkstätten
- 1999: Sculptures in the exhibition "100 years Berlin Museum for the Blind"
- since 1999: Sale of sculptures via the Kunst AG internet platform
- 2000: Telephone Box Sculptures
- 2006: Acquisition of the Figuren gegen das Vergessen by the Stiftung Brandenburgische Gedenkstätten to the Mahn- und Gedenkstätte Ravensbrück, with the permanent installation at the former Ravensbrück concentration camp
- 2008 and 2010: Hanging Forest – installation project for a potential site in Berlin
- 2011: Hanging Hedges – land art project developed for the Tiergarten in Berlin
- 2011: Art project Modelling for blind children at the Johann August Zeune School for the Blind in Berlin
- 2011: Commission for the annual Hans-Peter Hauschild Prize for the Deutsche Aidshilfe
- 2012/13: Sturgeon r.t.r. Project – artistic and sculptural accompaniment of the reintroduction of sturgeon in rivers in Germany, the Netherlands, France and England

Several of the projects mentioned above were founded or implemented as part of a social engagement.

==== Applied art and art handcraft ====
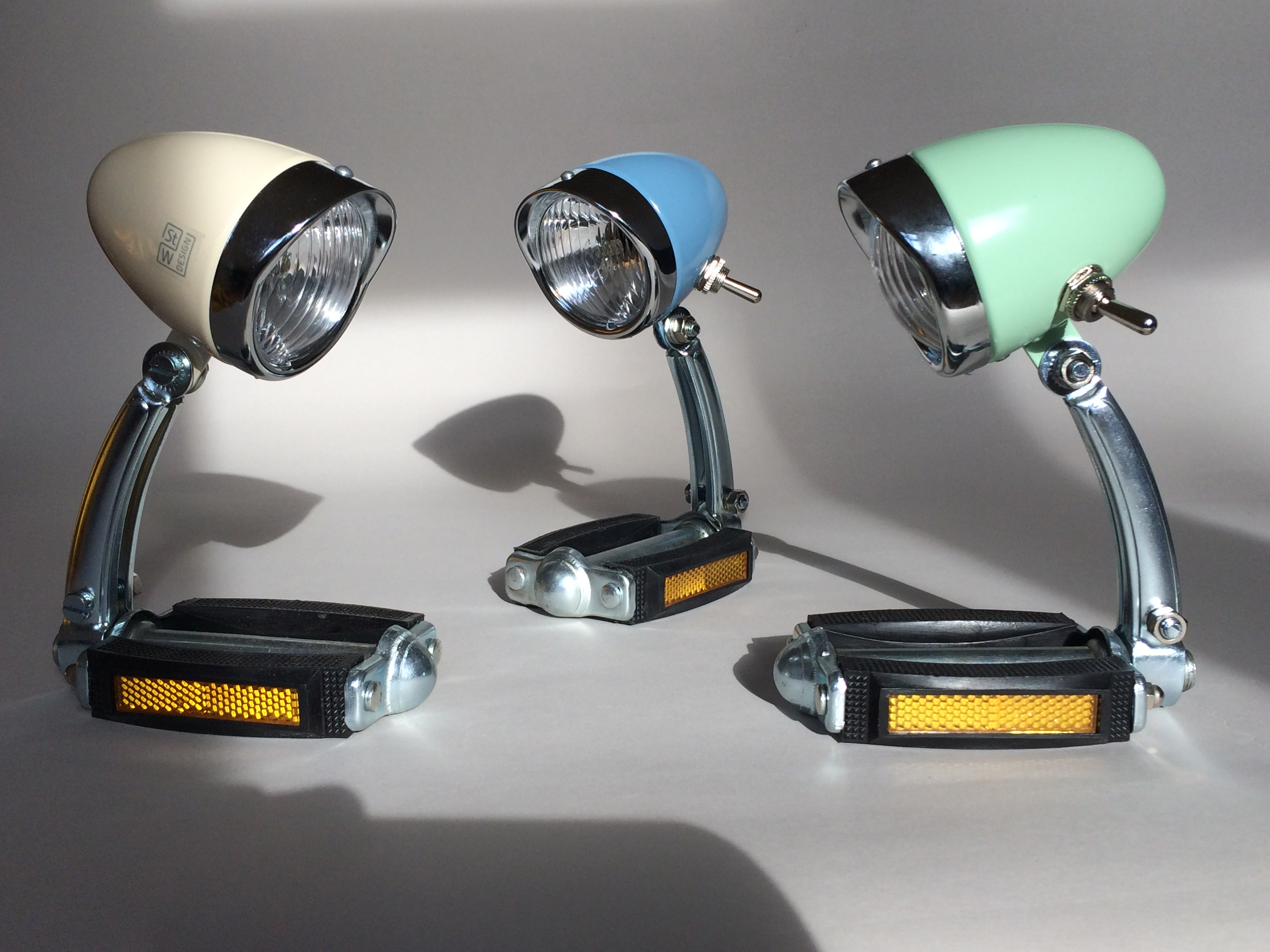
Portable LED lamps blamp 1 spring collection upcycled from bicycle parts

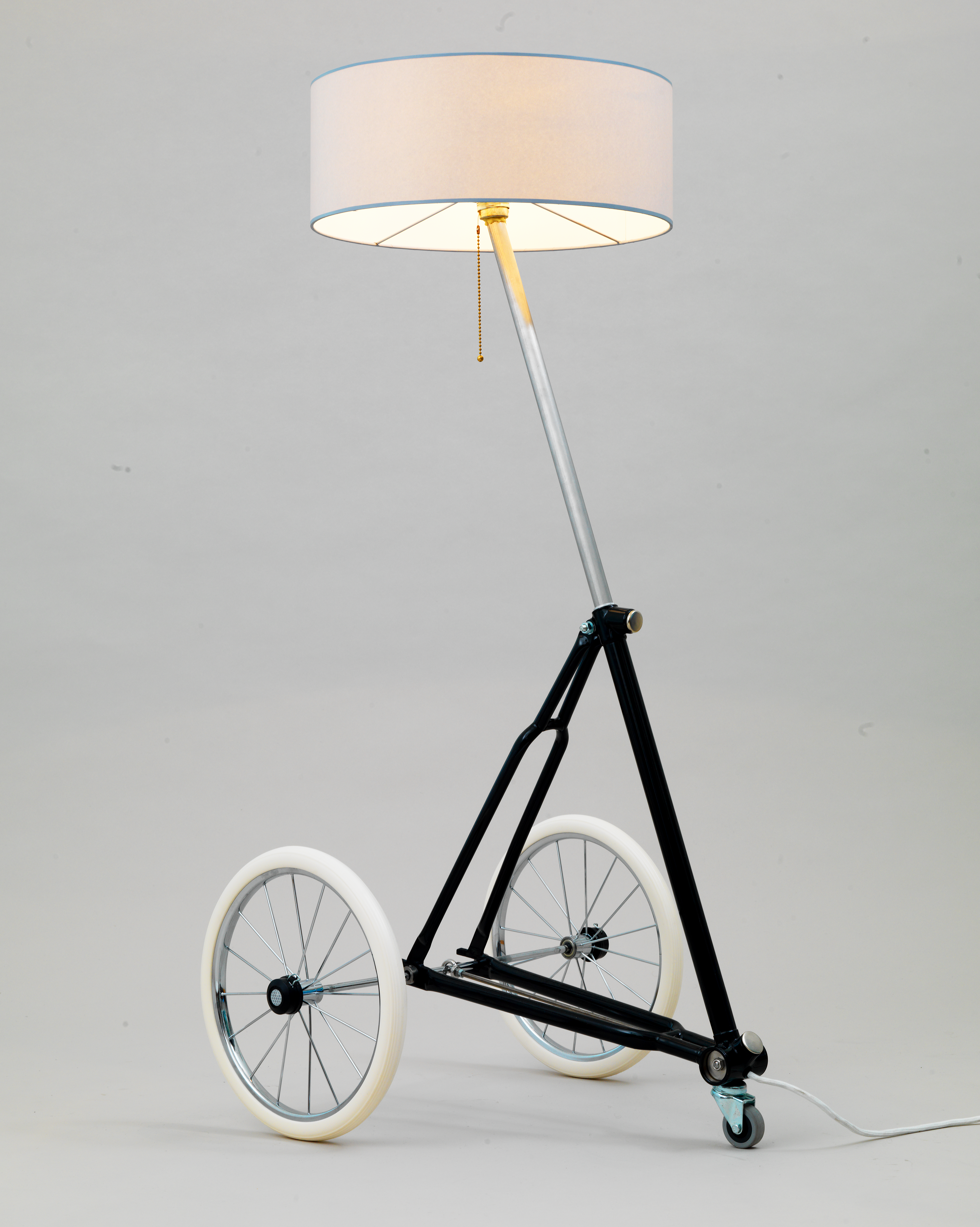
Lamp Old Moabit black upcycled from bicycle parts

- 2014: Expansion of the bronze furniture series living sculpture
- 2016: Creation and marketing under the Upcycling label stw-design
- Lamp collection Smart Upcycling Ideas from Berlin (blamp 1 spring collection and light art object Alt Moabit black from old bicycle parts)
- April 2025: Bicycle upcycling exhibition at ‘FahrArt’ in the ‘Haus der Materialisierung’, Berlin
- May 2025: Bicycle upcycling exhibition at ‘VELOBerlin 2025’ at Tempelhofer Feld in Berlin

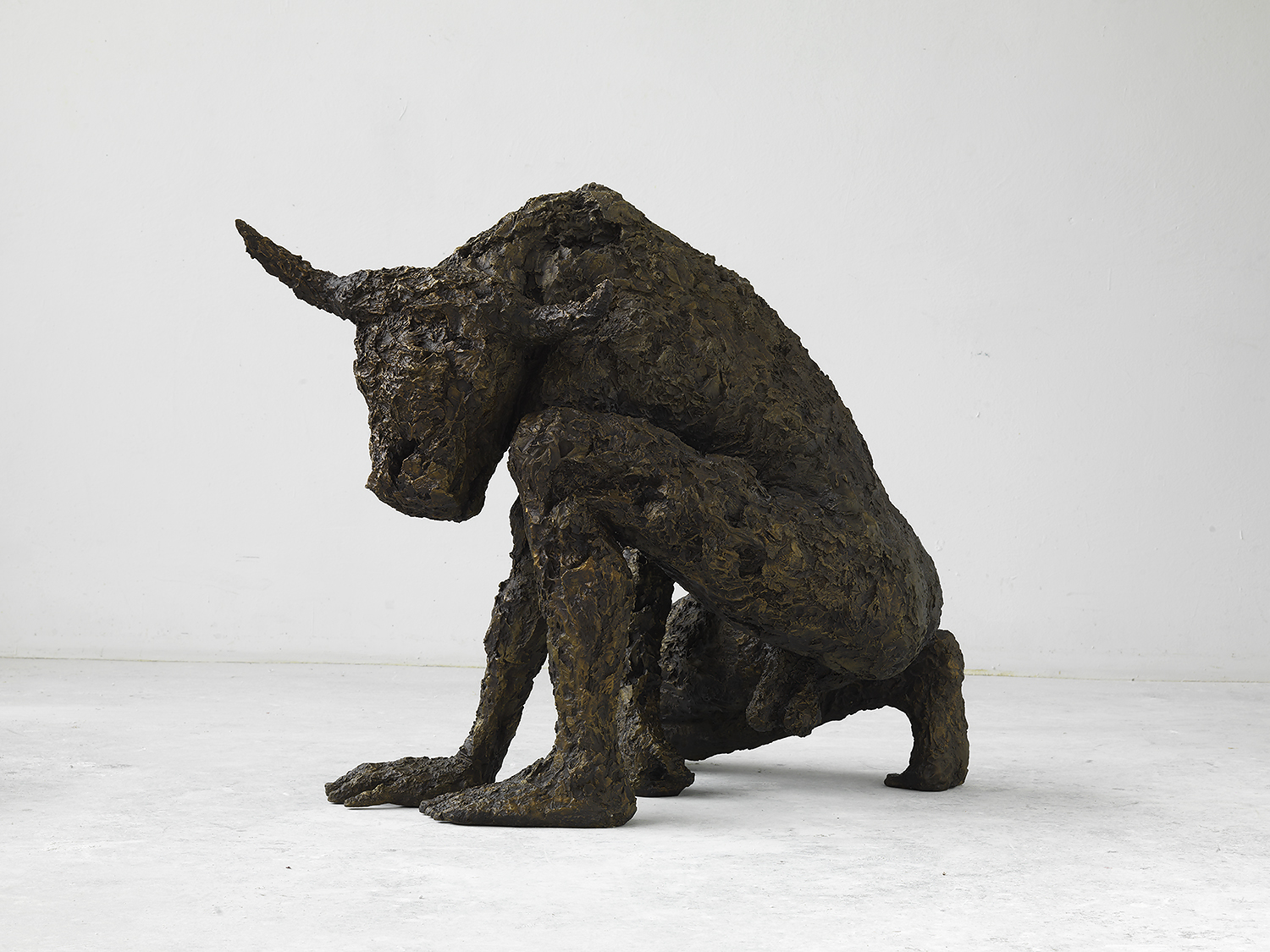
"Mythological Minotaur" bronze figure in the art foundry Hermann Noack, Berlin

=== Solo exhibitions (selection) ===
- Gallery Schlangenbader Strasse at Wilmersdorf Art Center
- Gallery Schlangenbader Strasse at Wilmersdorf Art Center
- Gallery Treppenhaus II at Steglitz Art Center
- "Statues against forgetting" at Anhalter Bahnhof
- 8 figures in the Hohenzollern Church in Berlin-Wilmersdorf
- 8 figures in the Berlin Cathedral
- Gallery Hofkunst
- "Statues against forgetting" in the memorial sites of the former concentration camps of Sachsenhausen, Ravensbrück, Neuengamme and Theresienstadt (Terezín)
- "Statues against forgetting" at the Ministry for Federal and European Affairs in Bonn, opening speeches by Ignatz Bubis (President of Central Council of Jews in Germany), the Minister and the artist
- "Statues against forgetting" in front of the Landtag of North Rhine-Westphalia in Düsseldorf
- "Statues against forgetting" in the House of the Wannsee Conference
- "Statues against forgetting" in the Jacobsfriedhof in Weimar – in connection with the nomination to the European Culture Capital 1999
- "Dogs – the fight and the fighting" in the gallery sleeping dogs in Berlin
- "Dogs" at The Westin Grand Berlin
- Gallery Skulpturenzentrum am Spreebord of the Hermann Noack art foundry
- ‘A dog is never ... just a dog!’ at Moeckernkiez-Café, Berlin-Kreuzberg, 10 December 2022 to 31 January 2023

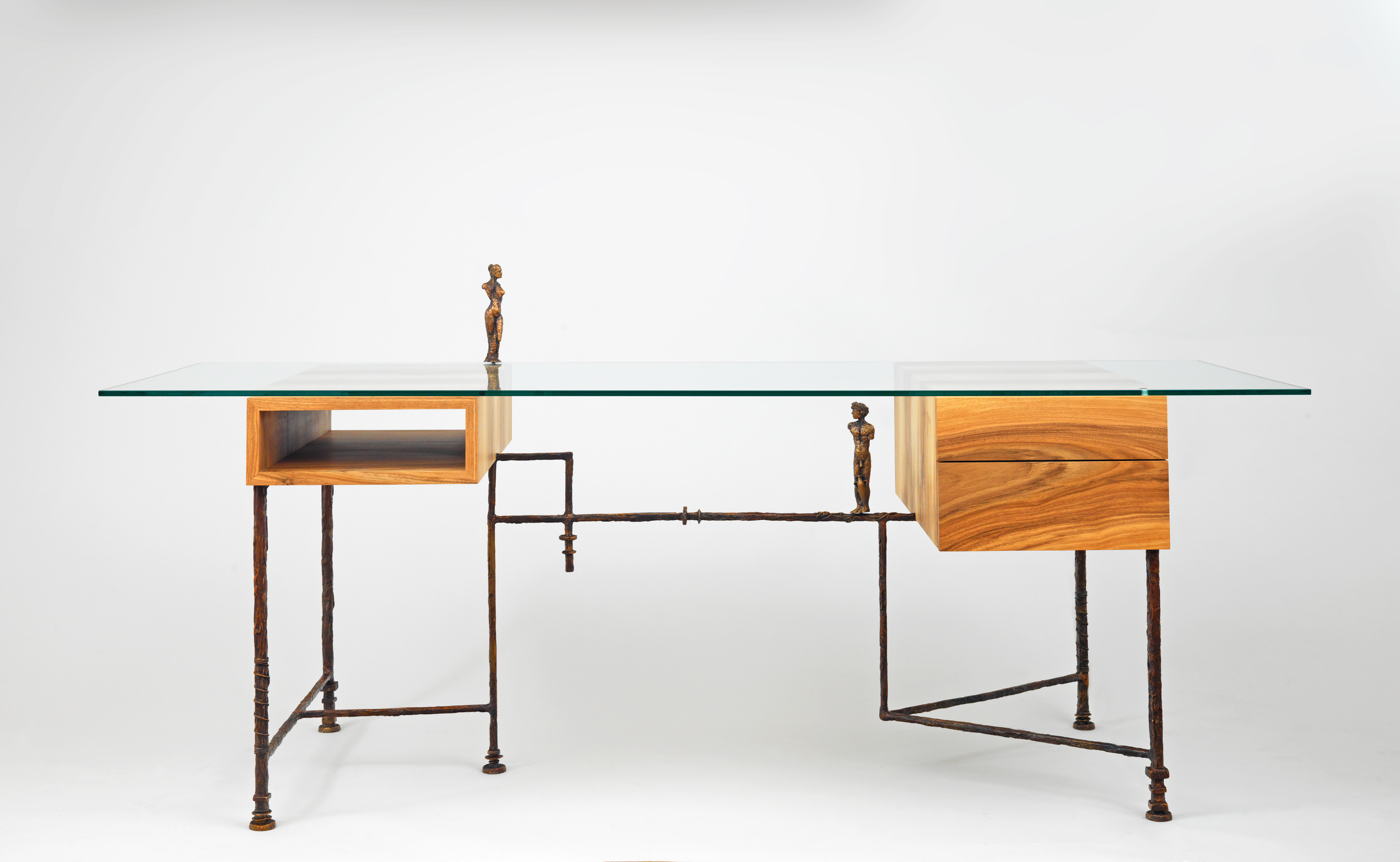
Desk named Latitude made out of bronze, nut wood and glass

Bronze table named Amphibians with glass surface and animal figures

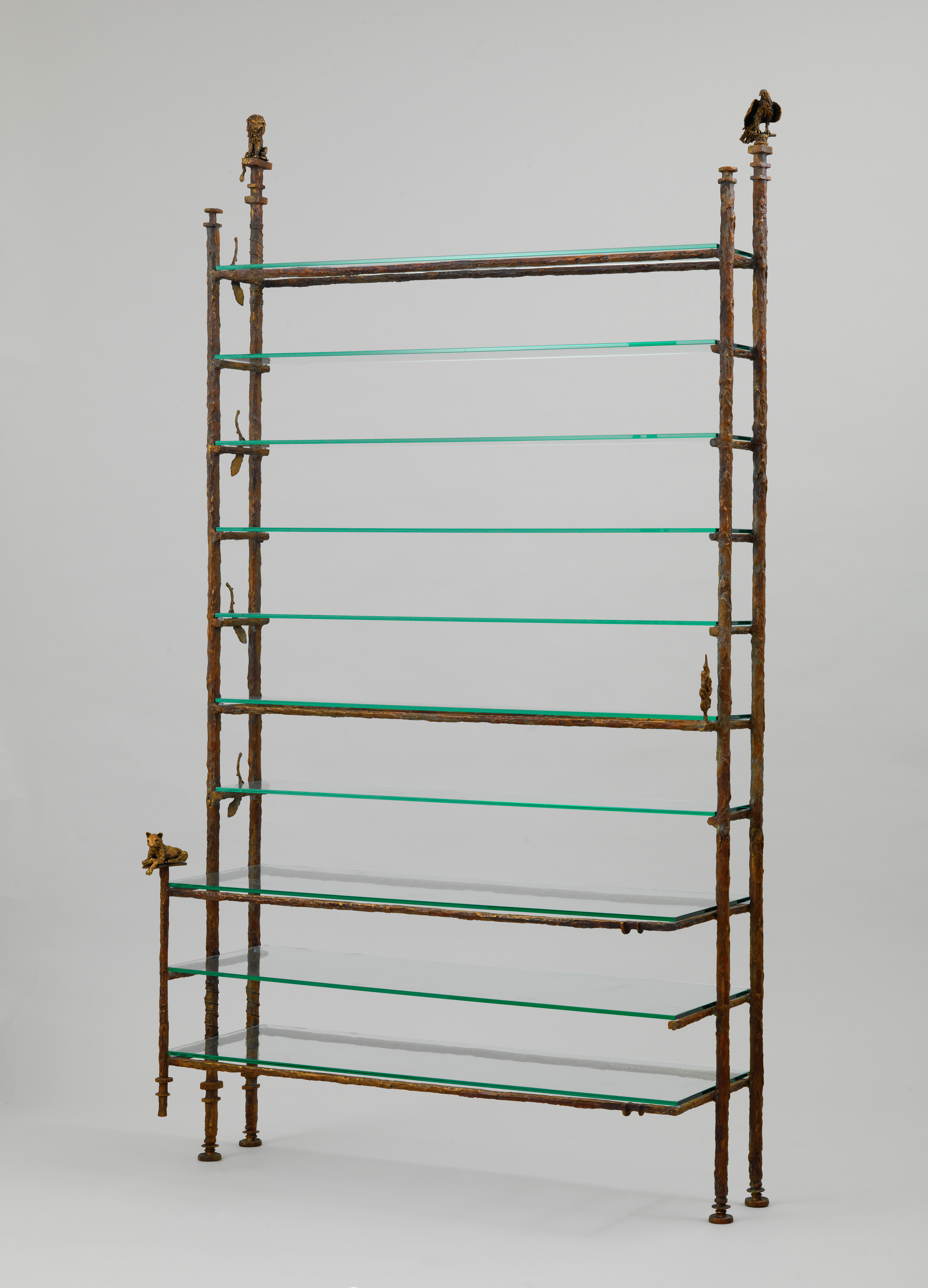
Bronze shelf named Arabesque with glass floors and figuartive accessoires

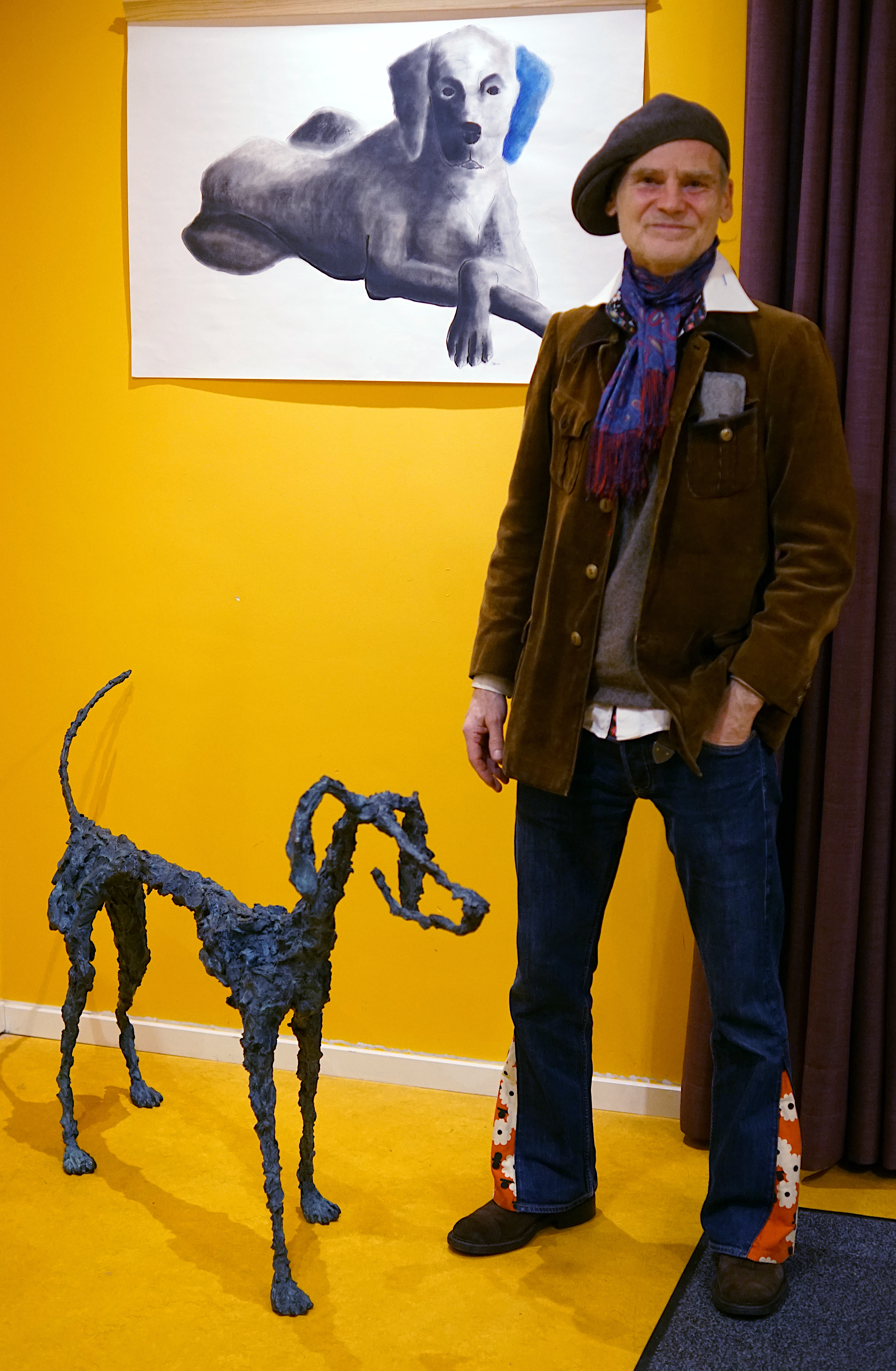
Stuart Wolfe at the vernissage of his exhibition ‘A dog is never ... just a dog!’

=== Group exhibitions ===
- Gallery Hahn Sylt, Künstlerhaus Odense and U-Bahn-Linie 9 in Berlin with the sculptor association of Michael Schütz
- Gallery Richter Berlin
- Workshop gallery Hermann Noack
- Gallery sleeping dogs with "4 Europeans 1 dog"
- Deutsche Aids Hilfe (German AIDS Aid), Berlin
- Maison & Objet, Paris
- Hamburg Museum of Work
- Forum Factory Berlin, Gallery Week End
- Gallery Michael Schmalfuß in the Löwenvilla, Potsdam
- Art workshop ‘Auf den Gleisen nach Theresienstadt’ (On the tracks to Theresienstadt), since March 2023

=== Social engagement ===
- modelling workshops for inmates at the women's prison, Berlin-Lichtenberg, May to September 2022
- modelling workshops for blind and visually impaired people at the studio at Moeckernstrasse, Berlin-Kreuzberg, January/February 2024 and July 2025

=== Awards ===
2003: Artist in Residence in Berlin

== Reception in the media (selection) ==
Probably the most detailed description of the 1983 film Eine Liebe wie andere auch starring Stuart Wolfe in one of the two leading roles is provided by the Berlinale-programme, in which the two directors, Hans Stempel and Martin Ripkens, were interviewed. At the 2008 Berlinale, Stempel and Ripkens received a Special Teddy Award for this film, that from its very launch had been contested for breaking social conventions.

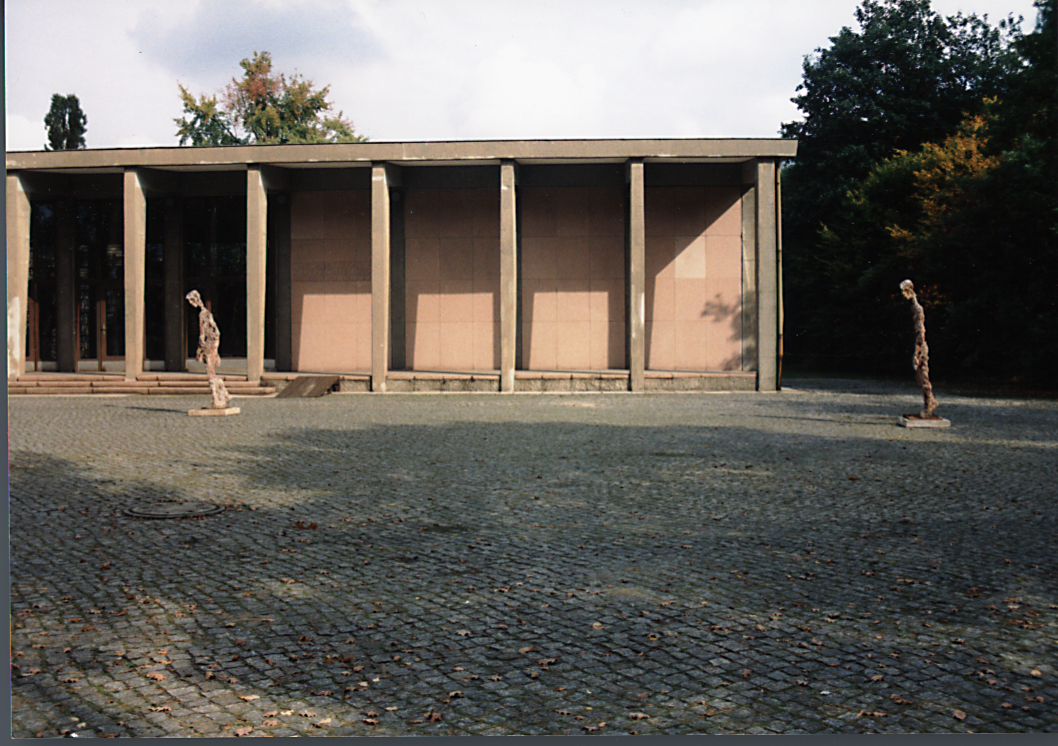
"Statues against forgetting" in the Sachsenhausen memorial site

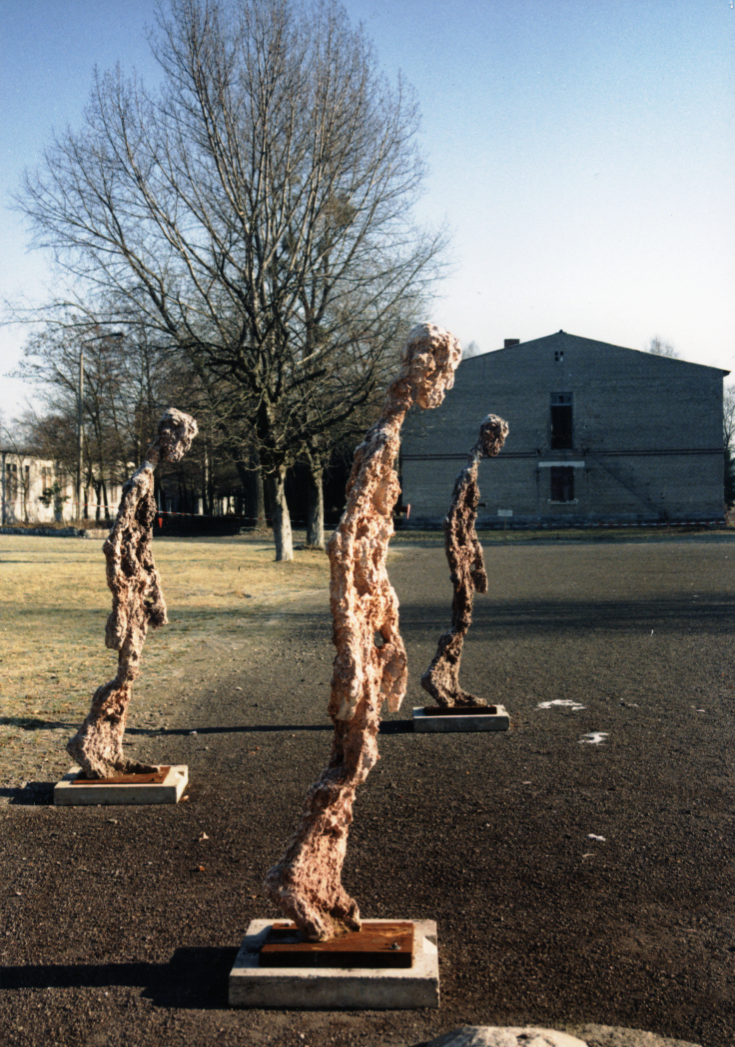
"Statues against forgetting" in the Ravensbrück memorial site

The sculptor Wolfe attracted international attention with his "Figuren gegen das Vergessen", which were set up over several years at various locations (Anhalter Bahnhof Berlin, KZ-Memorial Site Sachsenhausen and Ravensbrück et al.) and finally purchased by the Brandenburg Memorials Foundation. The eight sculptures are made of plaster, wood, wool and iron and bear different coloured triangles as symbols for the different prisoner groups.

The Working Group "Confrontations" Berlin is a partner of the Fritz Bauer Institute and dedicated to the pedagogical approach to the history and impact of the Holocaust. On its website Wolfe is portrayed as an artist who has always been very preoccupied with the topics of National Socialist persecution and the Holocaust, also referring to the youth project at the "Klinkerwerk Memorial Site" of the Sachsenhausen Memorial. The website publishes biographies and articles by or about personalities such as Hannah Arendt, Fritz Cremer, Jürgen Habermas or film director Loretta Walz.

In 2008 a report was made by the German federal government on the handing over of the sculptures to the Brandenburg Memorials Foundation for the Ravensbrück Concentration Camp Memorial Site by Hermann Schäfer, the deputy commissioner of the federal government for culture and media. Schäfer: "The statues by the artist Stuart Wolfe add an artistic aspect to the historically founded exhibition at the Ravensbrück Memorial Site. Wolfe confronts us with people on their way to the concentration camp. I am very pleased that the German government was able to support the acquisition of these statues, here, in an authentic place, where they can unfold their special message.“

In 2017, Spiegel Online showed a series of photographs of the sculptures set up in the memorial site with the caption: "Against Forgetting: "Figuren gegen das Vergessen" is the name of the art works set up in front of the gate of the Ravensbrück Memorial Site. They are intended to commemorate the crimes that took place behind the high walls of the concentration camp. Among other things, these included the forced operations on mostly Polish women".

Various views of the Figuren gegen das Vergessen are also available from the Alamy stock photo library.

In addition, Wolfe's design projects receive repeated recognition in blogs, press and TV reports in Europe, Asia and Latin America, for example Costa Rica. Since this involves upcycling, his work is also perceived as part of the maker movement, which represents consumers making things themselves instead of buying mass-produced goods. The important criteria being, sustainability, optimal adaptation and a creative impulse. This was discussed in 2016 by experts, at the Forum Technoversum, the debate on the future in the German Museum of Technology. In 2017 the Berlin-based "TrenntMagazin" (meaning "Separate the garbage! Magazine") published an interview with Wolfe on the subject of upcycling art. The British cultural travel portal "The Culture Tip" classifies Wolfe's work with used bicycle parts as part of the Berlin Re Cycling project.
