= Iao =

Iao may refer to:

- IAO (album), an album by avant jazz musician John Zorn
- Yao (Gnosticism), an archon corresponding to Jupiter
- ʻIao Theater, a theater in Wailuku, Hawaii
- ʻĪao Valley, a tourist attraction in Maui, Hawaii
- ιαω, an early Greek form of the tetragrammaton, or name of the biblical god

IAO may stand for:

- Incorporated Association of Organists: see Organist#Organizations
- Indian Astronomical Observatory, home of the highest telescope in the world
- Information Awareness Office, a branch of the U.S. Defense Advanced Research Projects Agency (DARPA)
- Interests, Activities, and Opinions - psychographics
- Axact, formerly known as International Accreditation Organization (Houston, Texas)
- International Academy of Osteopathy, an international school offering academic training in osteopathy
- International Astronomy Olympiad, an astronomy competition for high-school students by the Eurasian Astronomical Society
- Interparliamentary Assembly on Orthodoxy, an organization of parliamentarians of the Eastern Orthodox Church
- Institut d'Asie Orientale (Lyons Institute of East Asian Studies), a centre for research in human and social sciences at Université Lumière-Lyon 2 and Institut d'études politiques de Lyon
- Institute for Art and Olfaction, a non-profit organization
- Istituto agronomico per l'oltremare (Overseas Agronomic Institute), a technical and scientific body of the Italian Ministry of Foreign Affairs
- Sayak Airport (IATA code: IAO), also known as Siargao Airport, in Surigao del Norte, Philippines

== See also ==
- Yao (disambiguation)
