= Leslie Malton =

American-German actress

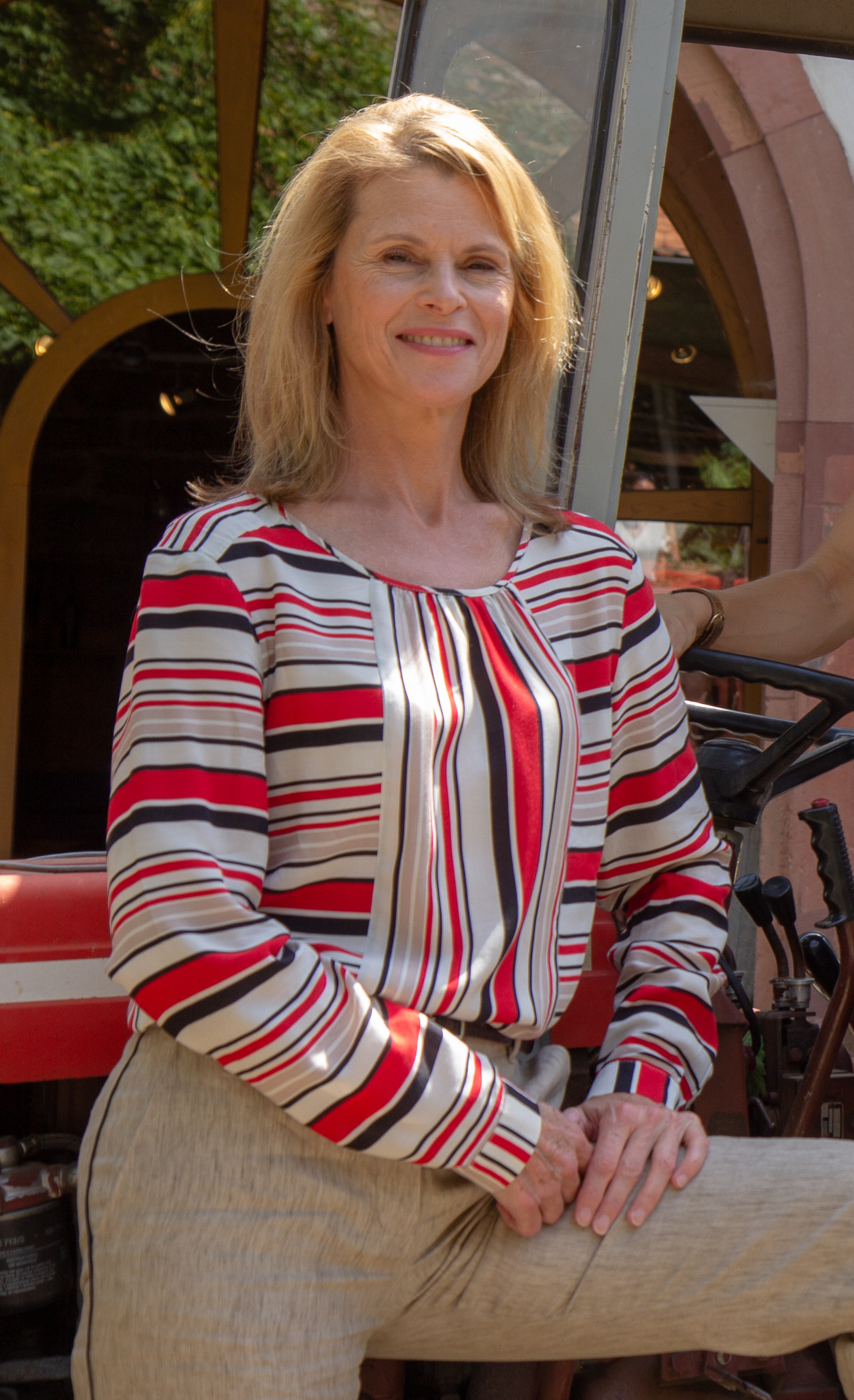
- Malton in 2018
- Born: 15 November 1958 (age 67); Washington, D.C., United States
- Occupation: Actress
- Spouse: Felix von Manteuffel (1995–present)

Leslie Antonia Malton (born 15 November 1958) is an American-German actor. She is the chair of the Bundesverband Schauspiel (BFFS).

== Life ==
Malton is the daughter of a US diplomat father and an Austrian mother. She only lived in the United States for five years, spending her school and youth days in Vienna. At the age of 14, she knew she wanted to be an actress.

Malton started her acting career in the theater. From 1985 she was a member of the Wiener Burgtheater, where she first appeared as Ophelia in William Shakespeare's Hamlet (title role Klaus Maria Brandauer; director Hans Hollmann). Later she was often seen in productions by George Tabori for radio plays.

Malton has appeared and starred in numerous German television films and series, and also works as a spokeswoman for radio plays.

For her first international cinema production, she was engaged in 1984 by the Japanese director Masato Harada for the racing film Races. In this Japanese-German co-production, she played the main female role alongside Hiroyuki Watanabe, Claus Theo Gärtner, Deborah Sasson, Stuart Wolfe, Dean Reed and Patrick Stewart.

In 1990, she received a Golden Camera Prize for three main roles in Perfume for a Suicide (La Mort a dit peut-être), The Copper Trap (Die Kupferfalle), and Dangerous Seduction (Plagio a.k.a. Il piccolo popolo). She had her breakthrough with German audiences in 1992 with her role as Gudrun Lange in the ZDF – four-part series The Great Bellheim, for which she won the Bavarian TV Prize in 1993 and the Telestar was awarded. In this miniseries by Dieter Wedel she acted alongside Mario Adorf, Will Quadflieg, Renan Demirkan, Heinz Hoenig, Ingrid Steeger and Dominique Horwitz. Since then she has been one of the most sought-after TV actresses in Germany.

Malton has been married to actor Felix von Manteuffel since 1995 and lives in Berlin. In addition to American citizenship, she has had German citizenship since 2019.

== Social engagement ==
In 2011, Malton volunteered to serve as spokeswoman for the project Deutsche Winterreise by the author Stefan Weiller. Since 2009, the project – in collaboration with institutions such as the Diakonisches Werk – has given city-specific attention to the situation of homeless people in a song and text series.

Since 2013, she has been an ambassador for children with Rett syndrome in Germany, which her younger sister has been affected by. In 2015 the book Letter to My Sister, which Malton wrote with Roswitha Quadflieg, was released, in which she describes her sister's story and the relationship between them.

== Selected filmography ==
- The Dream House (1980), as Esther
- Possession (1981), as Sara
- The Magic Mountain (1982), as Hermine Kleefeld
- The Unapproachable (1982, TV film), as Marianne
- Blood and Honor: Youth Under Hitler (1982, TV miniseries), as Renate Keller
- Kinder unseres Volkes (1983, TV film), as Katrin Henk
- Races (1984), as Sam
- Das Totenreich (1986, TV film), as Jytte Abildgaard
- Ticket to Rome (1986, TV film), as Lisa
- The Post Office Girl (1988, TV film), as Isabelle von Heim
- Stolen Minds (1990, TV film), as Alice
- Shadows of Love (1992), as Christin
- The Great Bellheim (1992, TV miniseries), as Gudrun Lange
- Die Elefantenbraut (1994, TV film), as Siri
- Ärztin in Angst (1995, TV film), as Dr. Rebecca Schreiber
- Ehebruch – Eine teuflische Falle (1996, TV film), as Lena Hoffmann
- The Tourist (1996, TV film), as Karen Lanz
- Nach uns die Sintflut (1996, TV film), as Barbara Rittberg
- Virus X (1997, TV film), as Dr. Simone Stenzel
- Midnight Flight (1998, TV film), as Angela Sullivan
- Nine Takes (2006), as Magdalena's Mother
- Innocence (2008), as Julia
- Waiting for Angelina (2009), as Dr. Helga Hallberg
- Quality Time (2013), as Helene Schuster
- Weekend Rebels (2023), as Mrs. Brinkhaus
