= Der Kapitän (TV series) =

- Starring: Robert Atzorn
- Country of origin: Germany

Der Kapitän is a German action-adventure television series from ZDF.

== Casts ==
- Robert Atzorn: Capitän Frank Harmsen
- Angelika Hartung: Elke Harmsen
- Doreen Jacobi/Jasmin Schwiers: Anita Harmsen
- Alexander Eisenfeld: Thomas Harmsen
- Dieter Hufschmidt: Reeder Nielson
- Jophi Ries: Chefingenieur Fritz Kaiser
- Sharon Brauner: Thea, Nielsons
- Jürgen Tarrach Wysocki
- Ulrike Folkerts: Environmennt activist Franziska Spöhr
- Günther Kaufmann:Fred
- Veit Schubert: First officer Horst Rochow
- Felix von Manteuffel: Frachtagent
- Georges Claisse: soldier La Croix
- Armin Dillenberger: soldier Paulsen
- Martin Semmelrogge: Steward Schmoltke
- László I. Kish: maschinist Oliver Droll
- Christine Neubauer: Dr. Beate Wollitz
- Jasmin Schwiers: Anita Harmsen
- Peter Fieseler: Simon Baum
- Waldemar Kobus: Manne Erdmann
- Nele Mueller-Stöfen: Dr. Isabel Kersten

== See also ==
- List of German television series
