= Robert Atzorn =

German actor (born 1945)

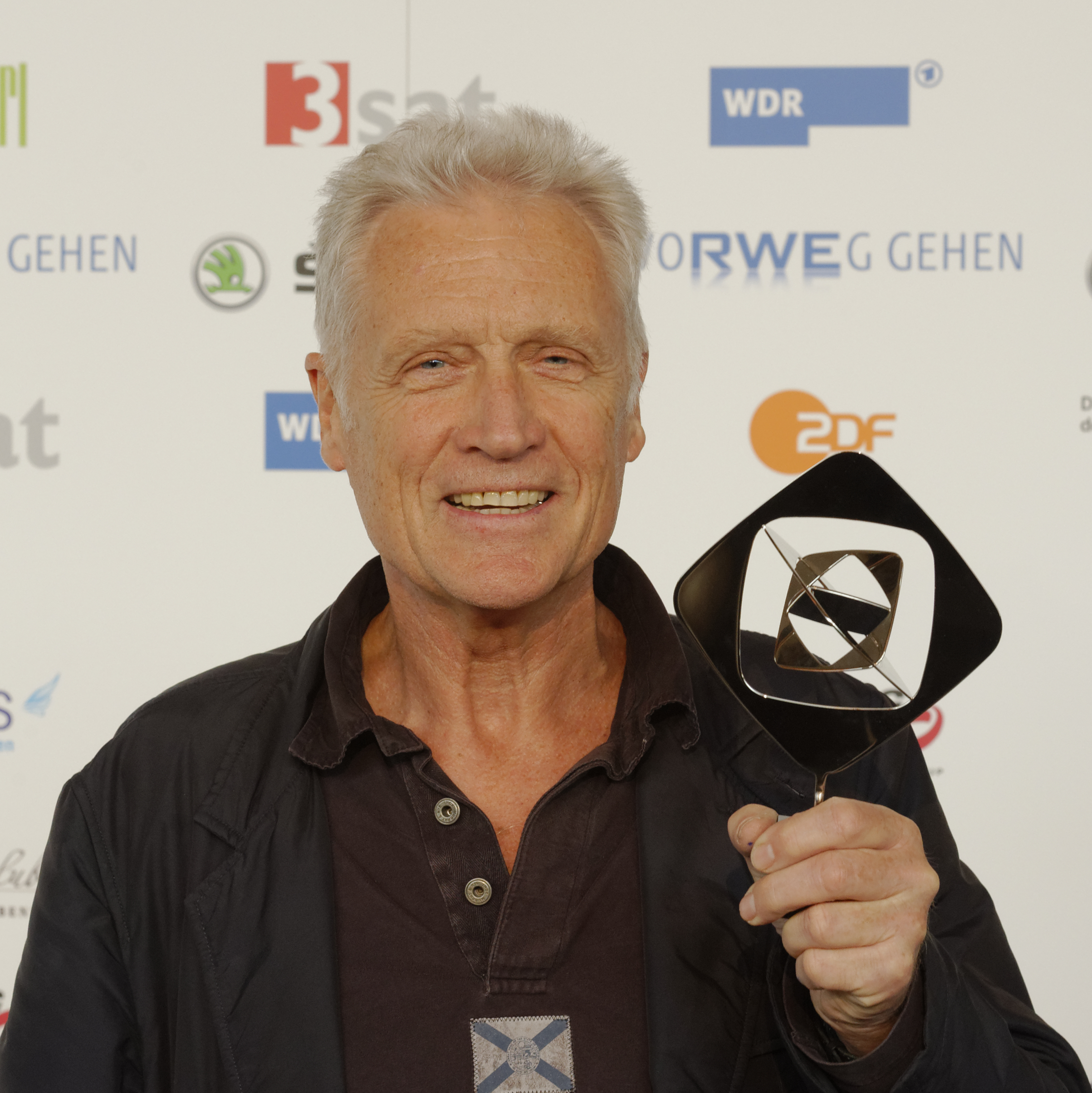
- Atzorn in 2013
- Born: 2 February 1945 (age 81); Bad Polzin, Pomerania, Germany
- Occupation: Television actor

Robert Atzorn (born 2 February 1945) is a German television actor. He was born in Bad Polzin, Pomerania, Germany, now Połczyn-Zdrój, West Pomeranian Voivodeship, Poland.

== Life ==
Robert Atzorn grew up in Oldenburg and Hamburg. He studied graphic design at the Art School Alsterdamm in Hamburg but felt drawn to the theater and therefore enrolled at the Neue Münchner Schauspielschule (1967–1969). In the season 1969/70 he got his first job at the Württembergische Landesbühne. Engagements followed at the Schauspielhaus Zürich (1970/1971), at the Theater Münster (1971/1972), at the Bühnen der Stadt Köln (1972/73), at the Theater Dortmund (1973–1975) and at the Residenz Theatre in Munich (1977–1983).

1980 Robert Atzorn played his first film role in From the Life of the Marionettes, directed by Ingmar Bergman. After many years in the theater he worked exclusively for television from the mid-1980s. In the late 1980s he gained exposure to a wider audience alongside Maren Kroymann in the family series Oh Gott, Herr Pfarrer. For his portrayal of the unconventional pastor in 1989, he received the Goldene Kamera. He became a crowd favorite in the title role of the 70-episode prime time series Unser Lehrer Doktor Specht, which was broadcast from 1992 to 1999. In 1993 he was honored with the Telestar. Robert Atzorn worked also in various episodes of the television series Forsthaus Falkenau, The Black Forest Clinic and Alphateam – Die Lebensretter im OP, and the crime series Derrick, Ein Fall für zwei, The Old Fox, Tatort and Die Männer vom K3.

As the successor of Manfred Krug and Charles Brauer he investigated from 2001 to 2008 as Tatort-homicide detective Jan Casstorff along with Tilo Prückner as Commissioner Holicek and Julia Schmidt as Jenny Graf for the NDR. The Tatort episode "Und tschüss" in February 2008 also meant the departure of Atzorn's investigator team.

He was also seen in 2002 Dieter Wedel's miniseries Die Affäre Semmeling as mayor Klaus Hennig. In the romantic comedy Kiss Me, Chancellor (2004) he slipped into the role of a head of government who falls in love with a maid, played by Andrea Sawatzki. Also in 2004 he was in front of the camera in Das Kommando, as the commander of a special unit, with his sons Jens and Daniel, who made his debut in the film as an actor. 2005 Atzorn played the head of the chancellery in the series Kanzleramt. In the ZDF production Africa, mon amour (2007) he played opposite Iris Berben, as occurred with Matti Geschonneck's Wer liebt, hat Recht and in Das Kommando. In the 2008 TV drama Mein Mann, der Trinker Robert Atzorn and Franziska Walser played a couple whose marriage is strained by the husband's alcohol addiction. Also in 2008, he reprised his role as Captain Frank Harmsen in two new episodes of the 1997-2000 adventure series Der Kapitän.

Robert Atzorn has been married to Angelika Hartung since 1976; they have two sons.

== Selected filmography ==
=== Movies and TV movies ===
- 1980: From the Life of the Marionettes
- 1982: Stella
- 1983: Krimistunde
- 1983: How Would You Like to Have It?
- 1983: Deep Water
- 1984: Déjà vu, oder Die gebändigte Geliebte
- 1984: Don Carlos
- 1984: Man Under Suspicion
- 1984: Flashback - Das schöne Ende dieser Welt
- 1984: The Wannsee Conference
- 1986: Kolping
- 1989: The Play with Billions
- 1989: Killer kennen keine Furcht
- 1989: Der Spatzenmörder
- 1990: Ich will leben
- 1990: Korczak
- 1990: Gesucht wird Rikki Forster
- 1993: Der Betrogene
- 1993: A Man for My Wife
- 1995: Zu Fuß und ohne Geld
- 1995: Ein Herz für Laura
- 1996: Herzen im Sturm
- 1997: Der Prinzgemahl
- 1998: Freiwild
- 1999: Ein Mann steht auf
- 1999: Ich bin kein Mann für eine Frau
- 2000: Dov'è mio figlio
- 2000: Qualcuno da amare
- 2000: Ein Mann gibt nicht auf
- 2001: Jenseits der Liebe
- 2002: Nicht ohne deine Liebe
- 2002: Wer liebt, hat Recht
- 2002: Tanners letzte Chance
- 2004: The Architects
- 2004: Das Kommando
- 2004: Küss mich, Kanzler
- 2006: Afrika, mon amour (TV miniseries)
- 2008: Mein Mann, der Trinker
- 2008: Im Gehege
- 2010: Until Nothing Remains
- 2010: Das Glück ist eine Katze
- 2010: Zimtstern und Halbmond
- 2011: Stilles Tal
- 2012: Terra X - Expedition in die Südsee. Georg Foster
- 2012: The Case of Jakob von Metzler
- 2013: Tod in den Bergen

=== TV series ===
- 1981: Derrick - Das sechste Streichholz
- 1981: Derrick - Tod im See
- 1985: Glücklich geschieden...
- 1985: Tatort - Der Mord danach
- 1985: Oliver Maass
- 1985: Die Schwarzwaldklinik − Der Versager/Die fromme Lüge
- 1986: Die Wächter
- 1986−1987: Stahlkammer Zürich − 18 episodes
- 1987: Derrick − Absoluter Wahnsinn
- 1987: Derrick - Mordfall Goos
- 1988: Oh Gott, Herr Pfarrer − 13 episodes
- 1990: Hotel Paradies
- 1991: Berlin Lady
- 1992−1999: Unser Lehrer Doktor Specht − 70 episodes
- 1994: Tatort – Bienzle und das Narrenspiel
- 1997−2000 / 2009: Der Kapitän − 9 episodes
- 2002: Die Affäre Semmeling
- 2005: Kanzleramt
- 2001−2008: Tatort (as inspector Jan Casstorff)
  - 2001 − Exil!
  - 2001 − Hasard!
  - 2002 − Der Passagier
  - 2002 − Undercover
  - 2003 − Harte Hunde
  - 2003 − Mietsache
  - 2004 − Todes-Bande
  - 2004 − Verlorene Töchter
  - 2005 − Ein Glücksgefühl
  - 2005 − Im Alleingang
  - 2006 − Feuerkämpfer
  - 2006 − Schattenspiele
  - 2007 − Liebeshunger
  - 2007 − Investigativ
  - 2008 − Und tschüss
- 2010: Tatort - Unsterblich schön
- 2011−2018: Nord Nord Mord − 8 episodes
