= Felix von Manteuffel =

German actor

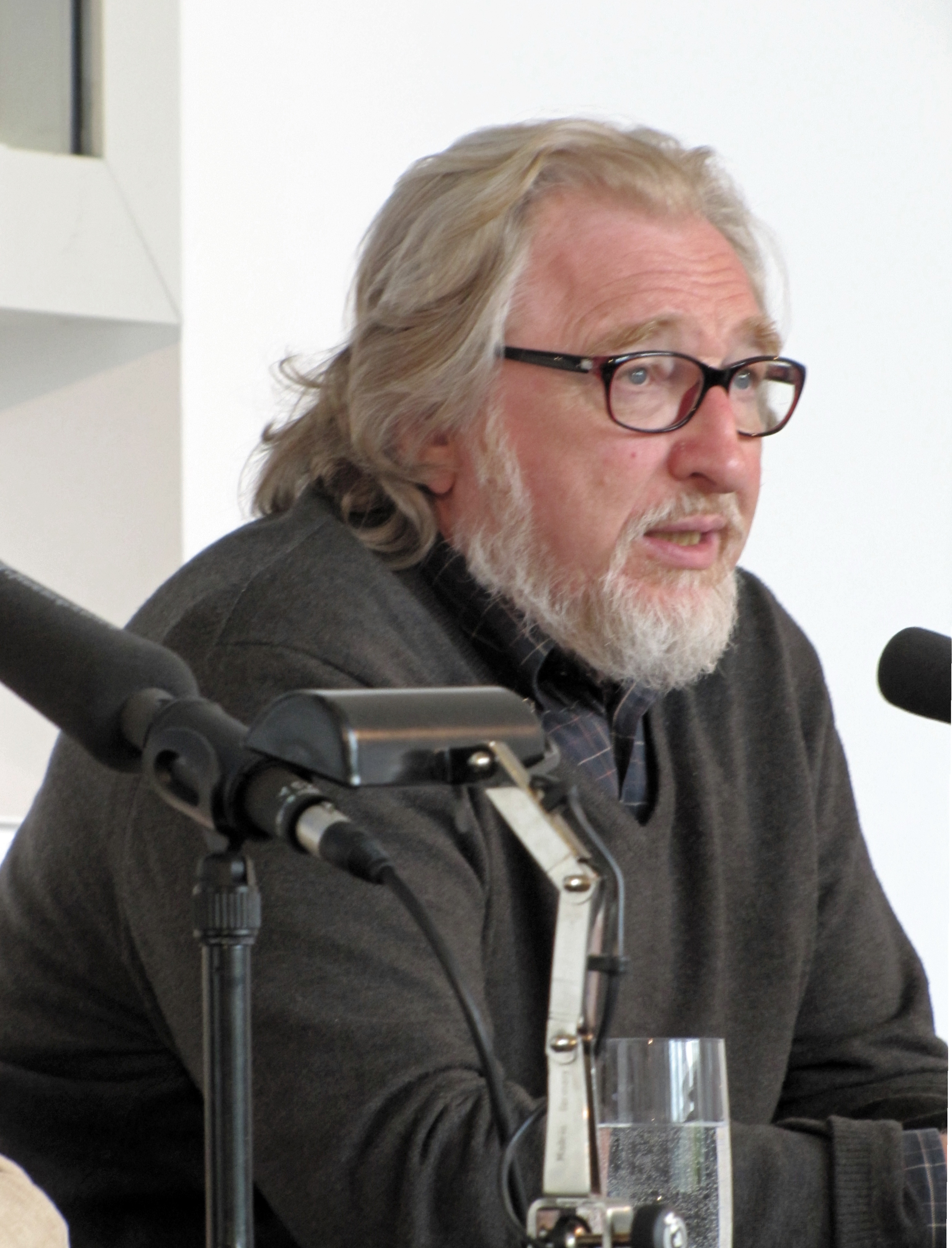
Felix von Manteuffel in 2011

Felix von Manteuffel (born Friedrich Karl Baron von Manteuffel-Szoege 6 May 1945) is a German actor.

Manteuffel was born in Bayrischzell to a family of Baltic-German origin. He attended an acting school in Munich from 1967 to 1970 and first appeared on stage in 1969 in Bertolt Brecht's Die Ausnahme und die Regel at the Munich Kammerspiele. Manteuffel was a member of the Kammerspiele ensemble from 1972 to 1984.

Manteuffel has performed at several German theaters, including the theater in Ulm, the Schauspiel in Köln, Deutsches Schauspielhaus (Hamburg), and Bayerisches Staatsschauspiel (Munich). He is also a well-known TV actor and voice actor in radio dramas.

Manteuffel has been married to the actress Leslie Malton since 1995.

== Awards ==
- Adolf Grimme Awards (1976)

== Filmography ==
- 1974: Goldfüchse
- 1975: Heirat auf Befehl
- 1977: Fairy
- 1978: Der alte Feinschmecker
- 1980–85: Die Grandauers und ihre Zeit (TV-Series)
- 1981/82: Per Anhalter durch die Galaxis (Radio-production)
- 1981: Wer den Schaden hat... (TV)
- 1981: Der Richter
- 1983: Sheer Madness
- 1985: Mary Ward
- 1985: Die Mitläufer
- 1986: Operation Dead End
- 1988: Eine Bonner Affäre
- 1988: Ein Sohn aus gutem Hause
- 1988: Wilder Westen inclusive
- 1990: Die Frosch-Intrige
- 1991: Bilder machen Leute
- 1991: Lippels Traum
- 1993: A Man for My Wife
- 1994: Die Elefantenbraut
- 1995: Bruder, ich brauche dein Blut
- 1995: Das Schwein – Eine deutsche Karriere
- 1995: Knallhart daneben
- 1996: Nach uns die Sintflut
- 1996: Ehebruch – Eine teuflische Falle!
- 1997: Der Kapitän – Im Vorhof der Hölle
- 1997: Der rote Schakal
- 1998: Der Traum von der Freiheit
- 1998: Rosenzweigs Freiheit
- 1998: Hurenmord – Ein Priester schweigt
- 1999: Herzlos
- 1999: Requiem for a Romantic Woman
- 2001: Hand in Hand
- 2003: In the Shadow of Power
- 2004: Baal
- 2005: Eine Mutter für Anna
- 2008: The Bridge
- 2013: Quality Time
