= College of Osteopaths =

The College of Osteopaths is a charitable trust that dates from 1948 and provides training leading to a Bachelor of Osteopathy degree. The course is flexibly delivered over 4 years. Lectures take place at the weekends allowing students to continue with full-time work until they complete their training. It is validated by the University of Derby. Uniquely, the course is offered in two locations in the United Kingdom; Borehamwood in Hertfordshire and Stoke-on-Trent, Staffordshire. The program has been accredited with Recognised Qualification status (RQ) by the national statutory regulatory body The General Osteopathic Council (GOsC).

The college operates two teaching clinics where osteopathic treatment is offered to all members of the local community at a subsidised rate. Clinics are based in Borehamwood, Hertfordshire; and Stoke-on-Trent. Treatment is provided and managed by senior students. All students attend clinic from year 1.

== See also ==
- List of osteopathic colleges
- Osteopathy
