= Gunther Emmerlich =

German opera singer and show presenter (1944–2023)

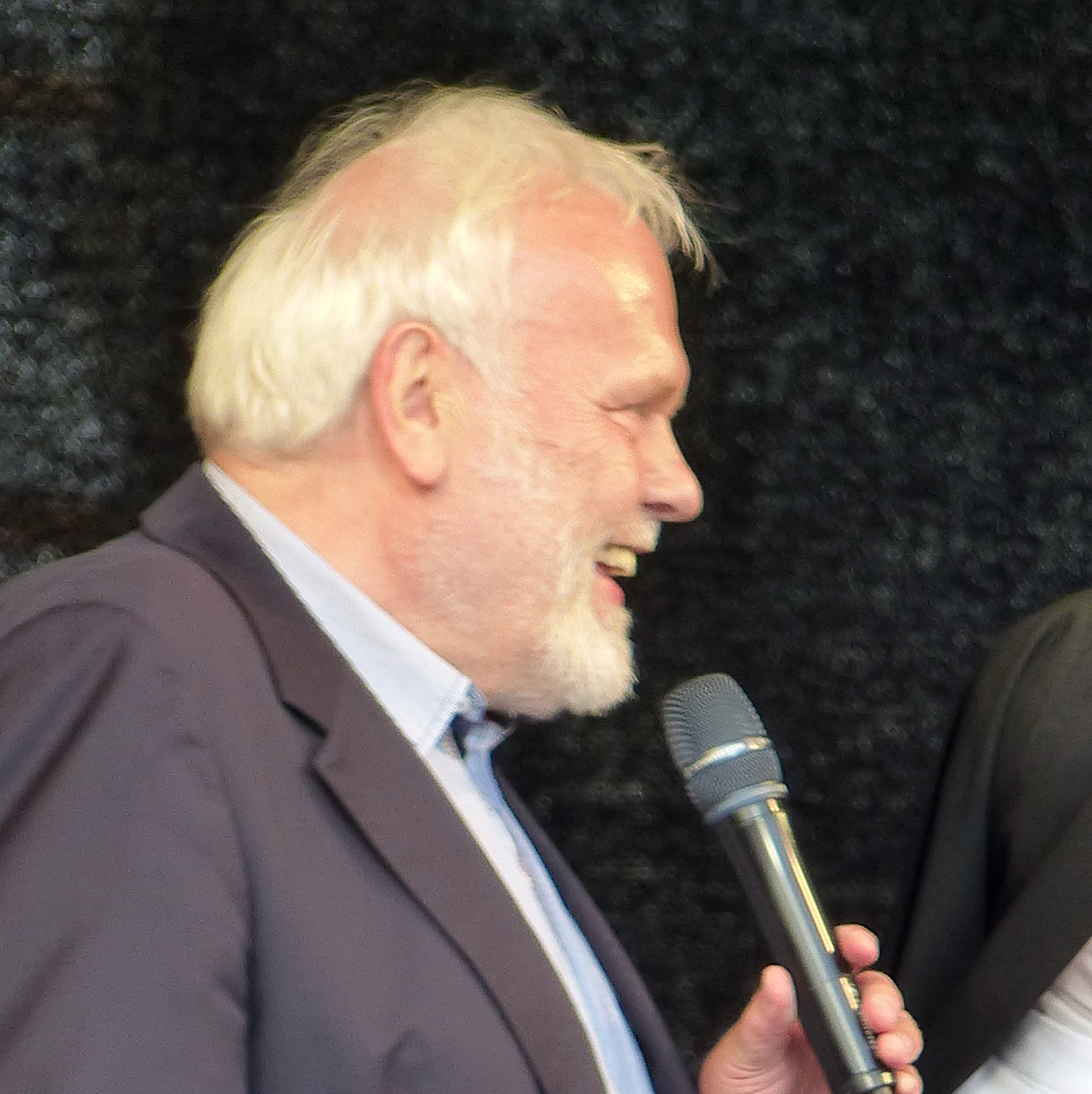
- Emmerlich in 2014
- Born: 18 September 1944; Eisenberg, Germany
- Died: 19 December 2023 (aged 79); Dresden, Saxony, Germany
- Occupations: Opera singer; television presenter
- Spouse: Anne-Kathrein Emmerlich (m. 1979; sep. 2014)
- Children: 2

Signature
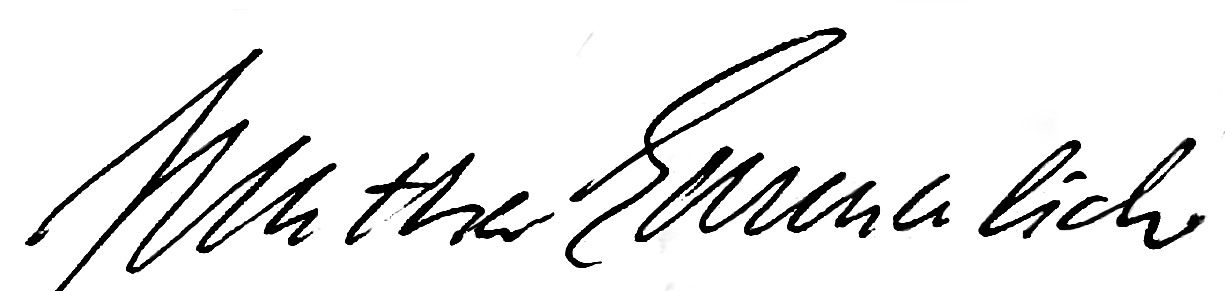

Gunther Emmerlich (German pronunciation: [ˈɡʊntɐ ˈɛmɐlɪç]; 18 September 1944 – 19 December 2023) was a German operatic bass, a member of the Dresden State Opera, and a television presenter of popular shows. He was also a jazz performer, playing the banjo.

== Life ==
Gunther Emmerlich was born during the final year of World War II in Eisenberg, a small town between Erfurt and Leipzig on 18 September 1944. His father never returned from the war and his mother died of multiple sclerosis at the age of 49 when he was eleven, although Emmerlich believed that an underlying cause was continued grief following the death of her husband. He was spared the orphanage thanks to his elder brother and sister, with whom he remained following his mother's death.

After successful completion of his schooling, he moved on to study civil engineering in Erfurt, but dropped out. Upon ending this training, he switched to music, studying to be an opera singer between 1967 and 1972 at the Franz Liszt Academy in Weimar, with Hans Kremers and Eleonore Elstermann. He studied further in Dresden with Johannes Kemter, and in master classes of the Russian bass Pavel Lisitsian. After working for the studio of the Dresden State Opera, he made his debut at opera as the Farmer in Carl Orff's Die Kluge in 1978, and then became a member of the ensemble. One of his signature roles was Osmin in Mozart's Die Entführung aus dem Serail. He took part in the performance of Weber's Der Freischütz to open the restored Semperoper, as Kuno. He starred in a celebrated performance of Axion Esti in Leipzig, conducted by composer Mikis Theodorakis. Other notable roles included Falstaff in Nicolai's Die lustigen Weiber von Windsor, Sarastro in Mozart's Die Zauberflöte, Tevye in The Fiddler on the Roof, Eliza's father in My Fair Lady, and Sallah Shabati in the musical of the same name by Ephraim Kishon. He also appeared as Rocco in Beethoven's Fidelio, Geronimo in Cimarosa's Il matrimonio segreto, and Dulcamara in Donizetti's L'elisir d'amore, successful not only in singing but also acting. Emmerich performed as a guest, often with the ensemble of the State Opera, such as Alfonso in Mozart's Così fan tutte in Amsterdam in 1988. In 2008, Emmerlich made his debut at New York's Carnegie Hall with the opera singer Deborah Sasson.

During the 1980s in the German Democratic Republic, Emmerlich embarked on a parallel career as a television presenter with Deutscher Fernsehfunk. Between 1987 and 1990 he hosted the television cabaret show Showkolade. For many years following reunification, Emmerlich was the presenter of Zauberhafte Heimat (Homeland Charms), a popular show transmitted from Leipzig, featuring popular music. This and other regular appearances made him a firm favourite with television audiences across both sides of the inner border.

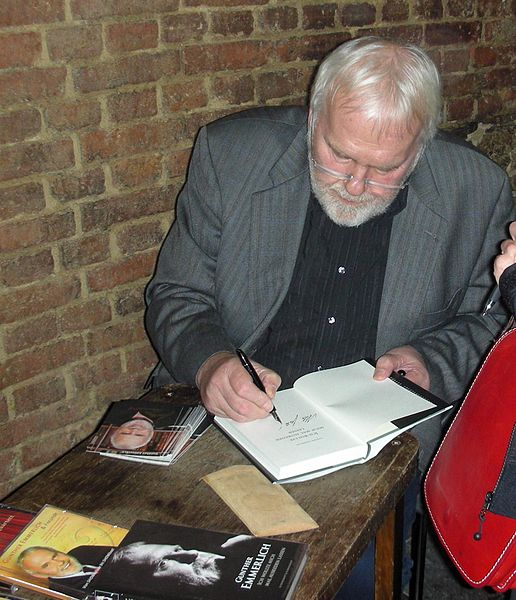
Emmerlich signing books in 2013

Starting in 2004 he hosted the Krone der Volksmusik, a folk music prize gala. From its revival in 2006 until 2015, Emmerlich hosted the SemperOpernball. He was a member of the Semper House Band, which takes most of its members from the orchestra of the Dresden State Opera, and was dedicated to performing traditional jazz.

== Personal life ==
Emmerlich was married to actress Anne-Kathrein Emmerlich (née Kretschmar); the couple had a son together. They separated in 2014 after a 35-year marriage. He also had a son from an earlier relationship. Emmerlich lived in the Villa Maria in Dresden.

Emmerlich died in Dresden on 19 December 2023, at age 79.

== Awards and honours ==
- 1990 Bambi Award
- 1997 Order of Merit of the Federal Republic of Germany
- Kammersänger

== Writings ==
- Emmerlich, Gunther (2007). Ich wollte mich mal ausreden lassen (in German). Berlin: Schwarzkopf & Schwarzkopf. ISBN 978-3-89602-753-5.
- —— (2010). Zugabe (in German). Berlin: Schwarzkopf & Schwarzkopf. ISBN 978-3-89602-949-2.
- —— (2016). Gunther Emmerlich - Spätlese (in German). Schwarzkopf & Schwarzkopf. ISBN 978-3-86265-624-0.
- —— (2020). FORTGESCHRITTEN: Von Gunther Emmerlich handsignierte Erstausgabe (in German). Berlin: Schwarzkopf & Schwarzkopf. ISBN 978-3-86265-829-9.

== Discography ==
- Emmerlich, Gunther; Semper House Band (1995), Semper-House-Band Dresden und Gunther Emmerlich, Dresden: Sächsische Künstleragentur, OCLC 313743451
- ——; Milster, Angelika; Mey, Reinhard; Fleming, Joy; Zieger, Petra; Günther-Fischer-Band (1992), Gunther und drüber eine Showkoladen-Platte mit Gunther Emmerlich und seinen Gästen (in German), Berlin: Deutsche Schallplatten, OCLC 1183517343
- ——; Rebroff, Ivan; Borg, Andy; Kastelruther Spatzen (1999), Zauberhafte Heimat mit Gunther Emmerlich (in German), München: Koch International, OCLC 1183703794
- —— (2004), Weihnachten mit Gunther Emmerlich Lieder, Geschichten und Gedichte zur Weihnachtszeit (in German), Dresden: Günther Michel, Gunter Pönisch, OCLC 1183780693
- Wewel, Günter; Rebroff, Ivan; —— (2006), Die 3 grossen Bassstimmen Günter Wewel, Ivan Rebroff, Gunther Emmerlich (in German), [Planegg]: Koch Universal, OCLC 1183766450
- Bender, Klaus; Suschke, Matthias; Händel, Georg Friedrich; Caldara, Antonio; Giazotto, Remo; Franck, César; Boyce, William; Bach, Johann Sebastian; Walther, Johann Gottfried; Isaac, Heinrich; Schulz, Johann Abraham Peter; Gounod, Charles; ——; Sandau, Kurt; Herzog, Sabina (2004), Festliche Kirchenmusik Barock, Romantik, Spiritual mit Gunther Emmerlich und Solisten-Ensemble (in German), Dresden: Gunter Grebler, OCLC 314723703
