= Oliver Maass =

- Starring: Robert Atzorn; Hans Clarin; Karl Lieffen
- Country of origin: Germany

Oliver Maass is a German television series.

== See also ==
- List of German television series
