= Unser Lehrer Doktor Specht =

- Created by: Kurt Bartsch
- Starring: Robert Atzorn, Corinna Harfouch, Gisela Trowe, Charles Brauer, Gerd Baltus, Claudia Wenzel
- Country of origin: Germany
- No. of seasons: 5
- No. of episodes: 70

Production
- Running time: 45 minutes

Original release
- Network: ZDF
- Release: 5 January 1992 – 1999

Unser Lehrer Doktor Specht (Our teacher Doctor Specht) is a series of family author Kurt Bartsch, directors Werner Masten (episodes 1-57), Vera Loebner (episodes 58-63) and Karin Hercher (episodes 64-70), shooting starting in 1991 in Germany. The episodes had a length of 52 (first season) or 46 minutes (second to fifth season). For subsequent repetitions of the episodes of the first season, the episodes were cut to about 45 minutes. In addition, they were provided with an alternative, shorter end credits sequence, which was also designed in a different font.

== Plot ==
Dr. Markus Specht is a teacher with heart and soul, his private life is often behind the students. In the five seasons Specht is transferred frequently and experiences the quiet town of Celle, a boarding school on an island (Krähenwerder), the political situation shortly after the Wende in Potsdam and Berlin, and at the end of the series, the Bavarian countryside, again in a boarding school. The exteriors were mostly shot on the island of Scharfenberg in Berlin-Tegel, which also houses a Gymnasium (school type) with adjacent school farm.

A few of the characters accompany him throughout the series, the pension owner Pia Kleinholz, which is later his stepmother, when she marries his father. She always follows the educator from town to town and buys new pensions where Specht lives.

In the story, all kinds of school subjects are dealt with, while his students are mostly high school students and 15 to 18 years old. Subjects were truancy, drugs, career pressures on students, divorces, pranks, kidnappings, extortion, evil and good caretakers and much more.

Specht itself is under some relationships, loses his beloved but increasingly due to the fact that it's more important than his students are often very demanding women. Specht is in every season and every change of school, first hated by his students, but then builds on a relationship of trust that sets it apart from other teachers.

== Particular ==
The series is, in contrast to the Lümmel-Filmen mit Hansi Kraus depicted realistically. School life is not embellished, but not dramatized. This gave the series an extraordinary popularity, and it became a ratings success. However, the materials to the shallow end of the series have been implemented, the rate of one burst and the series was finally discontinued. Especially Robert Atzorn also wanted to dedicate himself to new tasks, such as Tatort (since 2001 as Kommissar Jan Casstorff). In this context, he once remarked:

People will always see the teacher in me, I wish he would have died the serientod, or the corpse in my first Tatort is found with the cry "The Specht is dead!"

== Cast ==
In the series played numerous and well-known German actor guest starred or were for some seasons there. For Veronica Ferres meant her role as secretary Anita Kufalt in the second and third season of the breakthrough as an actress. The cast of the students are in most cases not caught on the show.

- Robert Atzorn as Dr. Markus Paul Specht (1991-1992, 1994-1999)
- Charles Brauer Julius Hartlaub (1991, 1994)
- Tamara Rohloff as a woman, "Little Lamb" Lammert (1991, 1992)
- Heinz Hoenig as Werner Roesler (1991)
- Mountain Wolf-Dietrich as Mr. Bloch (1991)
- Ingrid Bergmann as a woman, Liebscher (1991)
- Gisela Trowe as Pia Specht-Kleinholz (1991, 1992, 1994-1999)
- Gerhard Olschewski as the Lord "latte" Lattman (1991)
- Walter Tschernich as Alfons Duseler (1991)
- Imke Barnstedt as Mrs. Pieper (1991)
- Hartmut Becker as Lothar Pösel (1991)
- Sabine Postel as Liane Pösel (1991)
- Rosemarie Mägdefrau as Edith Heilbutt (1991)
- Fritz Bachschmidt as Oswald Specht (1991)
- Helmut Thickness (1991) as Mr. Kußnick
- Britta Schmeling as halibut Rieke (1991, 1994)
- Katrin Weisser as Ulrike von Barnim (1991-1992)
- Julia Valet as Bettina Weithase (1991)
- Ygal Gleim as Karlheinz "Charly" Schütze (1991-1993)
- Ursela Monn as Frau Schütze
- Michael Camman as Florian Ziesche † (1991)
- Fried Ptok as Mr. Ziesche (1991)
- Barbara Adolph as a woman Ziesche (1991)
- Corinna Harfouch as Dr. Lilo of Barnim (1991-1992)
- Verena Grosser as Susan "Susy" Golz (1991)
- Joachim Hermann Luger as Mr. Golz (1991)
- Johnny Müller Ulrich as "Ricky" Dassler (1991)
- Klaus Mikoleit as Mr. Dassler (1991)
- Kornelia Schmitz Elke Huhn (1991, 1992)
- Claudia Wenzel Fanny Moll (1991-1999)
- Christopher Wieszt as Michael Krahl (1991-1992)
- Rolf Zacher as Mr. Krahl (1991-1992)
- Irm Hermann as Mrs. Krahl (1991-1992)
- Bodo Wolf as Mr. Dillinger (1991)
- Maxi Biewer as Sister Evelyn (1991-1992)
- Djamchid 'Jim' Soheili as Mr. Rezan (1991)
- Klaus-Peter Haase as Mr. Ling (1991)
- Martina Gedeck as Ramona (1991)
- Peter Schiff as a club owner (1991)
- Ra Chorfi as Fari Rezan (1991)
- Christiane Reiff as Mrs. Schneider (1991)
- Dietrich Lehmann and Werner Schneider (1991)
- Henry Bastian as an angel Marius (1991-1992)
- Brigitte Janner as Mrs. Engel (1991-1992)
- Dieter Landuris as Günter "Fliege" Flieg (1991)
- Hannelore Droege as Mrs. Chicken / Zumbusch (1991)
- Dietrich Mattausch as Ewald Schopenhauer (1991, 1992, 1994)
- Christoph Hofrichter as Dietmar "Rainer Maria" Klose (1991)
- Antje Weisgerber as Henrietta Barnim (1991-1992)
- Gunter Berger as Prof. Zobel (1991)
- Anne Katrin citizens as Elvira Schramm (1992)
- Louis Haas as senator Paulick (1992)
- Dieter Hufschmidt as Mr. Amsel (1991–92)
- Werner Tietze as Dr. Alois Hofer (1992–95)
- Eberhard Feik as Mr. Bliese (1992)
- Wolf-Dietrich Sprenger as Mr. "Tacitus" Grützge (1992)
- Hartmut Schreier as howler Gisbert (1992-1995)
- Juergen Watzke than Mr. Menzel (1992)
- Dietmar Huhn as a janitor Beuke (1992)
- Klaus-Jürgen Steinmann as an alderman Matern (1992)
- Anette Hellwig as Nelly Bach (1992)
- Erika carter as Mrs. Bach (1992-1993)
- Hans Nitschke as Mr. Bach (1992)
- Hans-Martin Bull as an emergency physician (1992)
- Olga Eichler as Irina (1992-1993)
- Nico Siewert Schmalfuss as Lutz (1992)
- Andy Mechlinski as Udo "Bellucci" Grabowski (1992)
- Veronica Ferres as Anita Kufalt (1992, 1994)
- Marina Krogull as Therese Summer (1992)
- Anka Baier as Mrs. Lindemann (1992)
- Doreen Jacobi as Pauline Quandt (1992-1993)
- Daniela Ziegler as Paula Quandt (1992, 1994)
- Manfred Möck as Mr. Stanke (1992)
- Michael Kausch as Mr. Sperlich (1992)
- Eric Black as a woman doctor (1992)
- Uwe Steinbach as Maurice Blum (1992)

== See also ==
- List of German television series
