= Der Eugen =

- Written by: Peter Grohmann; Marielis Brommund; Felix Huby
- Directed by: Theo Mezger (and others)
- Starring: Walter Schultheiß (as Eugen Eisele); Ilse Kúnkele (as Elsbeth Eisele); Trudel Wulle (as Rosa Eisele); Alexander Gittinger (as Karl Eisele); Thomas Reiner (as Gottfried Hemmerle ); Regina Faerber (as Sybille Meier); Martin Schlepper (as Michele)
- Music by: Jonas C. Haefeli
- Country of origin: Germany
- Original language: German
- No. of episodes: 86

Production
- Running time: 8 minutes

Original release
- Network: ARD
- Release: 1986 – 1990

Der Eugen is a German television series consisting of 86 episodes. It was produced by Süddeutscher Rundfunk Stuttgart and broadcast on ARD's regional early evening programme in 1986. Each episode had a duration of eight minutes and was aired during commercial breaks.

The series revolves around the eventful tales of the fictional Swabian winery known as Eisele. The scripts for the episodes were written by several authors, including Peter Grohmann and Marielis Brommund, who collaborated with Felix Huby. The directorship of the series was handled by Theo Mezger and other individuals.

The central character, Eugen Eisele, was portrayed by Walter Schultheiß, while other prominent roles included Ilse Künkele as his wife Elsbeth, Trudel Wulle as his sister Rosa, Alexander Gittinger as his nephew Karl, Thomas Reiner as Gottfried Hemmerle, and Regina Faerber as Sybille Meier.

The filming for the series took place in Fellbach-Schmiden, specifically at the "Weingut Eisele" located on Salierstraße, and Stuttgart-Untertürkheim at the "Weinkeller des Weingutes".

In 2012, SWR released the first 60 episodes of "Der Eugen" on three DVDs.

== See also ==
- List of German television series
