= Nord Nord Mord =

German TV series

- Genre: Crime
- Starring: Robert Atzorn; Peter Heinrich Brix; Julia Brendler; Oliver Wnuk
- Country of origin: Germany
- Original language: German
- No. of episodes: 23 (27 planned)

Production
- Producers: Dietrich Kluge; Jutta Lieck-Klenke
- Running time: around 90 minutes
- Production company: Network Movie

Original release
- Network: ZDF
- Release: 21 April 2011 – present

Nord Nord Mord is a 2011 German crime film series produced by ZDF. From 2011 until 2018, Robert Atzorn played the role of Chief Inspector Theo Clüver in the first eight episodes. His successor was Peter Heinrich Brix as Commissioner Carl Sievers.

== Plot ==
At the Sylt detective agency, the edgy chief inspector Theo Clüver is more inclined to solve cases with empathy, patience and instinct rather than using modern investigative methods. His colleague, Ina Behrendsen, approaches the cases objectively, austerely and without emotion, while Hinnerk Feldmann, who comes from the Baltic Sea, stands out with his know-it-all attitude.

After Clüver's (Atzorn's) retirement, his position was taken over by the rather reserved and uncommunicative chief inspector Carl Sievers, who was transferred from Kiel to Sylt and combines a professional approach with an alert mind. However, he seems to be also carrying a health burden.

== Cast ==
Leading actor Robert Atzorn left the series at his own request after the eighth episode, Clüver und der leise Tod. His successor was Peter Heinrich Brix.

== List of episodes ==
No.	Title	Directed by	Written by	Original release date	Germany viewers (millions)
1	"Nord Nord Mord"	Josh Broecker	Lars Albaum	21 April 2011	4.29
2	"Nord Nord Mord – Clüver und die fremde Frau"	Anno Saul	Thomas Oliver Walendy	11 September 2013	7.31
3	"Nord Nord Mord – Clüvers Geheimnis"	Anno Saul	Stefan Cantz, Jan Hinter	9 March 2015	7.23
4	"Nord Nord Mord – Clüver und der tote Koch"	Anno Saul	Berno Kürten	4 April 2016	6.05
5	"Nord Nord Mord – Clüver und die wilde Nacht"	Anno Saul	Stefan Cantz, Jan Hinter	3 January 2017	7.16
6	"Nord Nord Mord – Clüver und die tödliche Affäre"	Christian Theede	Thomas Oliver Walendy	20 March 2017	7.33
7	"Nord Nord Mord – Clüver und der König von Sylt"	Thomas Jauch	Stefan Cantz, Jan Hinter	20 September 2017	6.52
8	"Nord Nord Mord – Clüver und der leise Tod"	Anno Saul	Anno Saul	15 January 2018	8.87
9	"Nord Nord Mord – Sievers und die Frau im Zug"	Thomas Jauch	Stefan Cantz, Jan Hinter	15 October 2018	8.16
10	"Nord Nord Mord – Sievers und die Tote im Strandkorb"	Christian Theede	Thomas Oliver Walendy	29 April 2019	7.31
11	"Nord Nord Mord – Sievers und die tödliche Liebe"	Berno Kürten	Berno Kürten	13 January 2020	8.41
12	"Nord Nord Mord – Sievers und die schlaflosen Nächte"	Anno Saul	Stefan Cantz, Jan Hinter	5 October 2020	8.52
13	"Nord Nord Mord – Sievers und der goldene Fisch"	Berno Kürten	Thomas Oliver Walendy	6 January 2021	8.52
14	"Nord Nord Mord – Sievers und der schönste Tag"	Maria von Heland	Thomas Oliver Walendy	15 March 2021	9.91
15	"Nord Nord Mord – Sievers und der schwarze Engel"	Berno Kürten	Stefan Cantz, Jan Hinter	18 October 2021	8.58
16	"Nord Nord Mord – Sievers und die Stille Nacht"	Sven Nagel	Thomas Oliver Walendy	20 December 2021	8.21
17	"Nord Nord Mord – Sievers und das mörderische Türkis"	Berno Kürten	Thomas Oliver Walendy	17 January 2022	10.32
18	"Nord Nord Mord – Sievers sieht Gespenster"	Ole Zapatka	Thomas Oliver Walendy	19 December 2022	8.95
19	"Nord Nord Mord – Sievers und die letzte Beichte"	Berno Kürten	Thomas Oliver Walendy	16 January 2023	9.44
20	"Nord Nord Mord – Sievers und der große Knall"	Ole Zapatka	Berno Kürten	27 February 2023	8.98
21	"Nord Nord Mord – Sievers und der erste Schrei"	Berno Kürten	Thomas Oliver Walendy	10 April 2023	6.13
22	"Nord Nord Mord - Sievers und der Traum vom Fliegen"	Alex Schaad	Katja Töner	18 December 2023	8.57
23	"Nord Nord Mord - Sievers und die fünf Fragezeichen"	Sven Nagel	Thomas Oliver Walendy, Berno Kürten, Sven Nagel	8 January 2024	8.40

== DVD releases ==
- Episodes 1–3 released 10 April 2015
- Episodes 4–5 released 17 March 2017
- Episodes 6–8 released 23 March 2018
- Episodes 9–10 released 10 January 2020
- Episodes 11–12 released 8 January 2021
- Episodes 13–14 released 23 April 2021
- Episodes 15–16 released 28 January 2022
- Episodes 17 and later have not been released on DVD yet.

== Reception ==
In the Frankfurter Allgemeine Zeitung, the journalist Michael Hanfeld judged the film series on 20 December 2021 (the 16th episode's first broadcast) as exemplary for the television films shown on German public television. The films in the series predominantly gave the impression of "a crime series in the Rosamunde Pilcher style, full of clichés, predictable in plot and character development, with subtle dialogue jokes and a soft pop soundtrack [...], a classic example of the solid television film escapism that is in the program of ARD and ZDF plays a major role."

== Running gags ==
In addition to humorous elements of the series, a running gag is that the photo collection of suspects (used in order to find the complete picture) is not stuck on a board, but stuck directly on the wall on the green screen and written on. After the case is solved, the wall can be seen being repainted.
