= Ein Fall für B.A.R.Z. =

German children's television series

- Country of origin: Germany

Ein Fall für B.A.R.Z. is a German children's television series, broadcast in 39 episodes between 2005 and 2007.

== See also ==
- List of German television series
