= Doreen Jacobi =

German actress and former model (born 1974)

- Born: February 28, 1974 (age 52)
- Occupations: Actor; model

Doreen Jacobi (born 28 February 1974) is a German actress and former model.

== Education ==
Between 1992 and 1993, Jacobi studied English, American Studies and Theater Studies.

From 1994, she took private drama lessons in London and New York City. In 1995 she completed various dance classes at the Actor's Center in Sydney.

From 2008 to 2011, she studied Information Technology at the University of Potsdam and graduated with an MBA degree.

== Acting ==
Jacobi became known in the early 1990s through the German ZDF television series Our Teacher, Doctor Specht. She was part of the main cast and, in parallel with her preparatory school studies, made 13 episodes between 1990 and 1992.

In 1997 she achieved a major audience with a leading role in the Sat.1 action series HeliCops – Einsatz über Berlin. Other engagements, mostly in television films and series, followed.

== Modelling ==
In 1993 she was discovered by a model scout of the agency Berlin Models. and took second place in Europe's largest model competition.

== Software ==
In 1999, Jacobi co-founded an enterprise software company, for which she works as a manager.

== Filmography (selection) ==
- 1993-1995: Unser Lehrer Doktor Specht (TV series)
- 1997: Lexx (TV series, episode 3: Eating Pattern)
- 1997: HeliCops – Einsatz über Berlin (Television series)
- 1998: Angel Express
- 1998, 2009: Alarm for Cobra 11 – The Highway Police (TV series, 2 episodes)
- 1999: St. Pauli Night
- 2000: Anna H. – Geliebte, Ehefrau und Hure (TV)
- 2000: Der Runner (TV movie)
- 2002: Das beste Stück (TV)
- 2003: Motown
- 2003: Die Schönste aus Bitterfeld (TV)
- 2004: Das allerbeste Stück (TV)
- 2004: Problemzone Schwiegereltern (TV movie)
- 2005: Macho im Schleudergang (TV movie)
- 2006: Crocodile Alert (TV movie)
- 2007: Tatort: The Lawyer (Television series)
- 2008: U-900
- 2009: 12 Winter (TV series)
- 2014: Between Times
