= Vienna School of Osteopathy =

Educational institution in Vienna, Austria

Coordinates: 48.188733°N 16.293325°E

- Established: 1991
- Director: Raimund Engel
- Academic staff: 16 (as of 2014)
- Administrative staff: 120 (as of 2014)
- Students: 350 (as of 2014)
- Location: Vienna, Austria
- Website: www.wso.at

The Vienna School of Osteopathy (WSO) is a private educational institution in Austria specialising in osteopathy. Extra occupational and postgraduate trainings are offered for physiotherapists and doctors of medicine. University programmes are also open for graduates from other osteopathy schools. Up to now 550 students finished their training and currently 350 students are enrolled in training groups. Established in 1991, the WSO was the first provider of osteopathic training at academic level in Austria. It is located in Vienna, Hietzing at Frimbergergasse 6.

== History ==
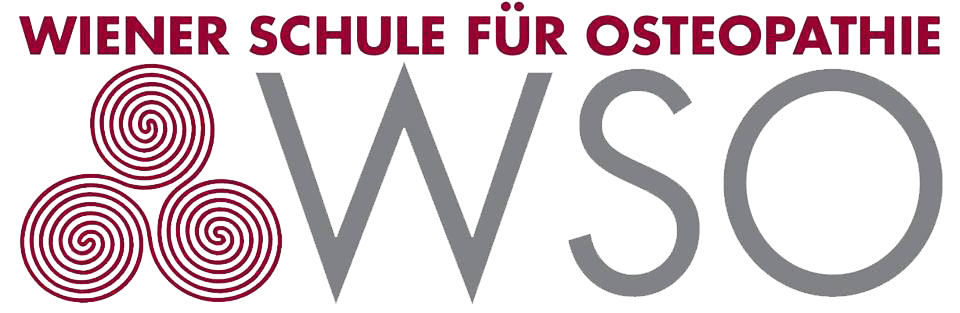
Vienna School of Osteopathy (WSO)

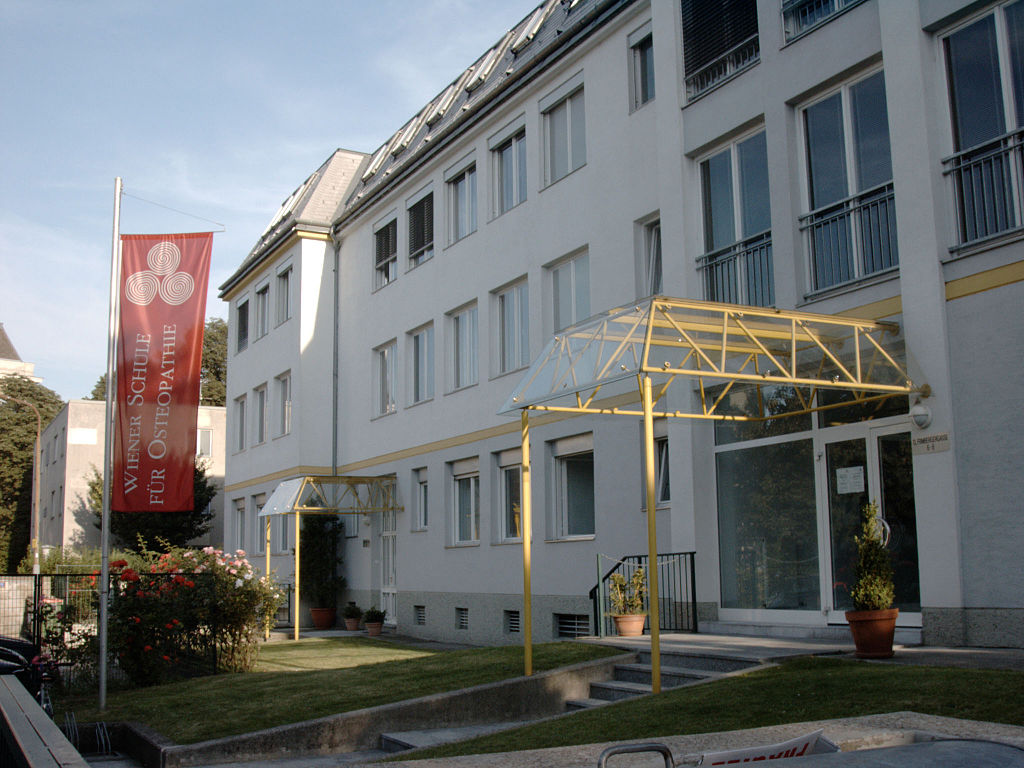
Building of the Vienna School of Osteopathy (WSO) in Vienna, Hietzing.

The Vienna School of Osteopathy (WSO) was established through its funding body International School of Osteopathy by Raphael van Assche, Margot Seitschek and Raimund Engel in cooperation with Bernard Ligner and the Centre International d’Osteopathie in St. Etienne, France. In 1998 this cooperation model was expanded to the European School of Osteopathy (ESO) in Maidstone, Great Britain.

The first courses were held in the facilities of the Kaiser Franz Josef Hotel and in the Kolpinghaus Währing in Vienna. In 1997 the WSO was relocated to Frimbergergasse 6 in the 13th district of Vienna. From the very start courses were held by mostly international lecturers.

Since 2005 the university programme Master of Science (Osteopathy) is offered in cooperation with the Danube University Krems. In this context scientific work at the WSO was enhanced and further developed. Diploma thesis and master thesis of a series of European osteopathy schools are published in the Osteopathic Research Web, which was initiated and is managed by the WSO. Since September 2009 the Teaching Hospital plays a vital role in WSO's osteopathic education. It is located in the facilities of the Wiener Privatklinik in Pelikangasse 15 in the 9th district of Vienna.

== Training ==
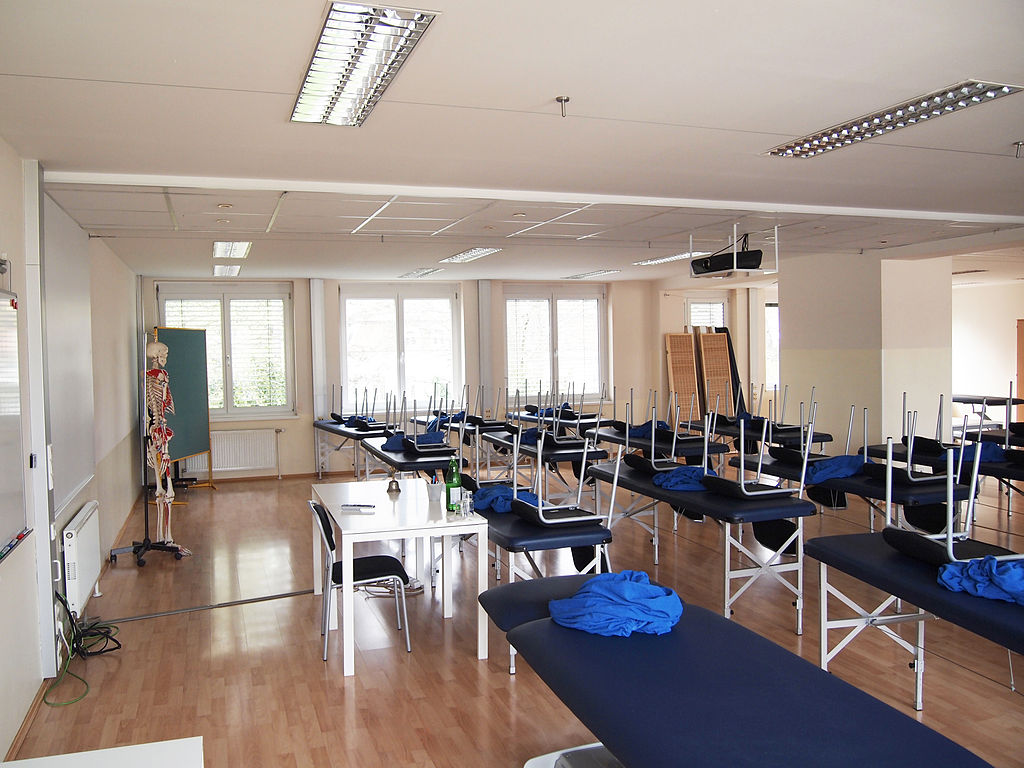
WSO's course rooms.

The training at the WSO is separated into two parts, the basic education and the university programme. The basis education comprises 1.200 course units and is a profound and overall osteopathic training, taught by an international team. The university programmes Master of Science (Osteopathy) and Academic Expert (Osteopathy) are offered in cooperation with the Danube University Krems and encompass 1090 and 535 course units, respectively. Furthermore, the WSO is provider of a broad range of postgraduate seminars.

== Cooperations ==
The WSO is politically tightly linked. It participated significantly in the founding of the Austrian Society for Osteopathy (ÖGO). Together with the Osteopathic Centre for Children (OCC) in London, Great Britain the WSO established the Osteopathisches Zentrum für Kinder (OZK) as a training centre for paediatric osteopathy, which subsequently became an autonomous institution. Since 2000 the WSO is involved in the Osteopathic European Academic Network (OsEAN'), which was founded in Great Britain. The WSO is a member school of OsEAN with Raimund Engel as president since 2006. The WSO also worked actively in the establishment of the Forum for Osteopathic Regulation in Europe (FORE). Through its cooperation with Fortbildungszentrum Klagenfurt (FBZ) the educational institution can offer another course location in Graz, Austria. In 2010, Raimund Engel took part in writing the Benchmarks for Training in Osteopathy of the World Health Organization.

== Clinical practice ==
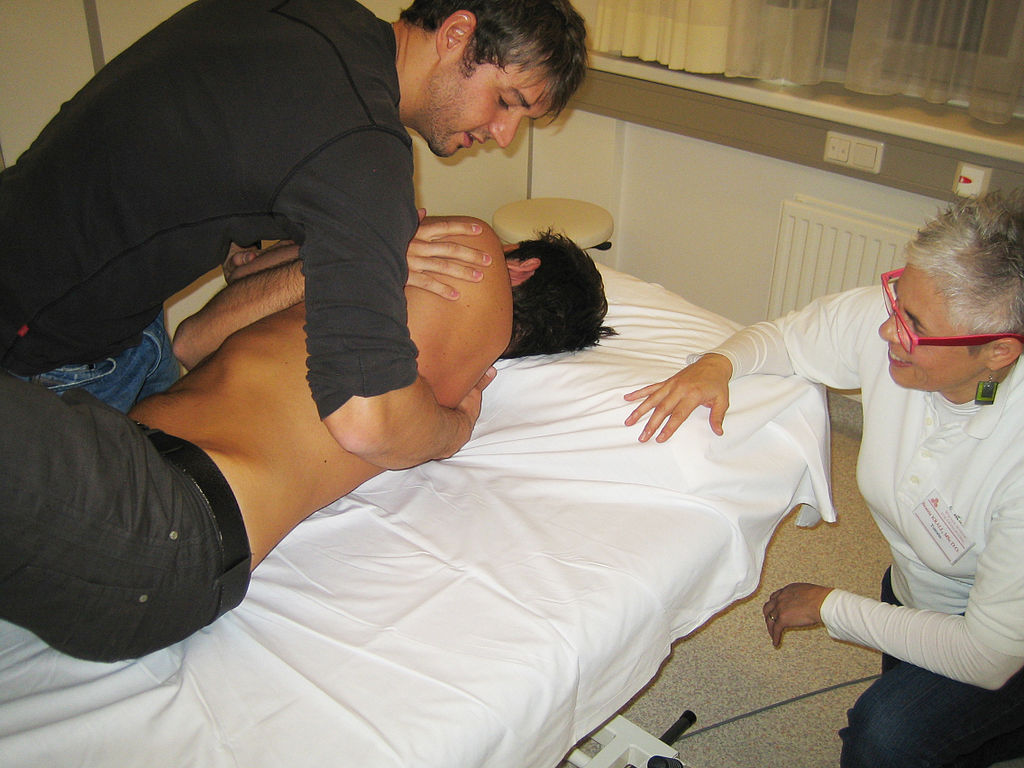
WSO's Teaching Hospital at Wiener Privatklinik.

In the Teaching Hospital the WSO offers mandatory clinic days in collaboration with the Wiener Privatklinik. Practicing in the Teaching Hospital together with supervised treatments form the practical part of WSO's education. In addition, in the university programmes, practical work is documented in a portfolio.

== Certifications and standards ==
The WSO is certified by Ö-Cert and CERT NÖ and is involved in a certification at European level from the European Committee for Standardization, conducted by the Austrian Standards International in May, 2014. Training at the WSO also correspond with the Standards of the Benchmarks for Training in Osteopathy of the World Health Organization.

== Management ==
Raimund Engel, co-founder of the WSO, is managing director and Erich Mayer-Fally is medical director.
