= Oh Gott, Herr Pfarrer =

- Starring: Robert Atzorn; Maren Kroymann
- Country of origin: Germany

Oh Gott, Herr Pfarrer is a German television series.

== See also ==
- List of German television series
