= Deborah Sasson =

Musician and opera singer

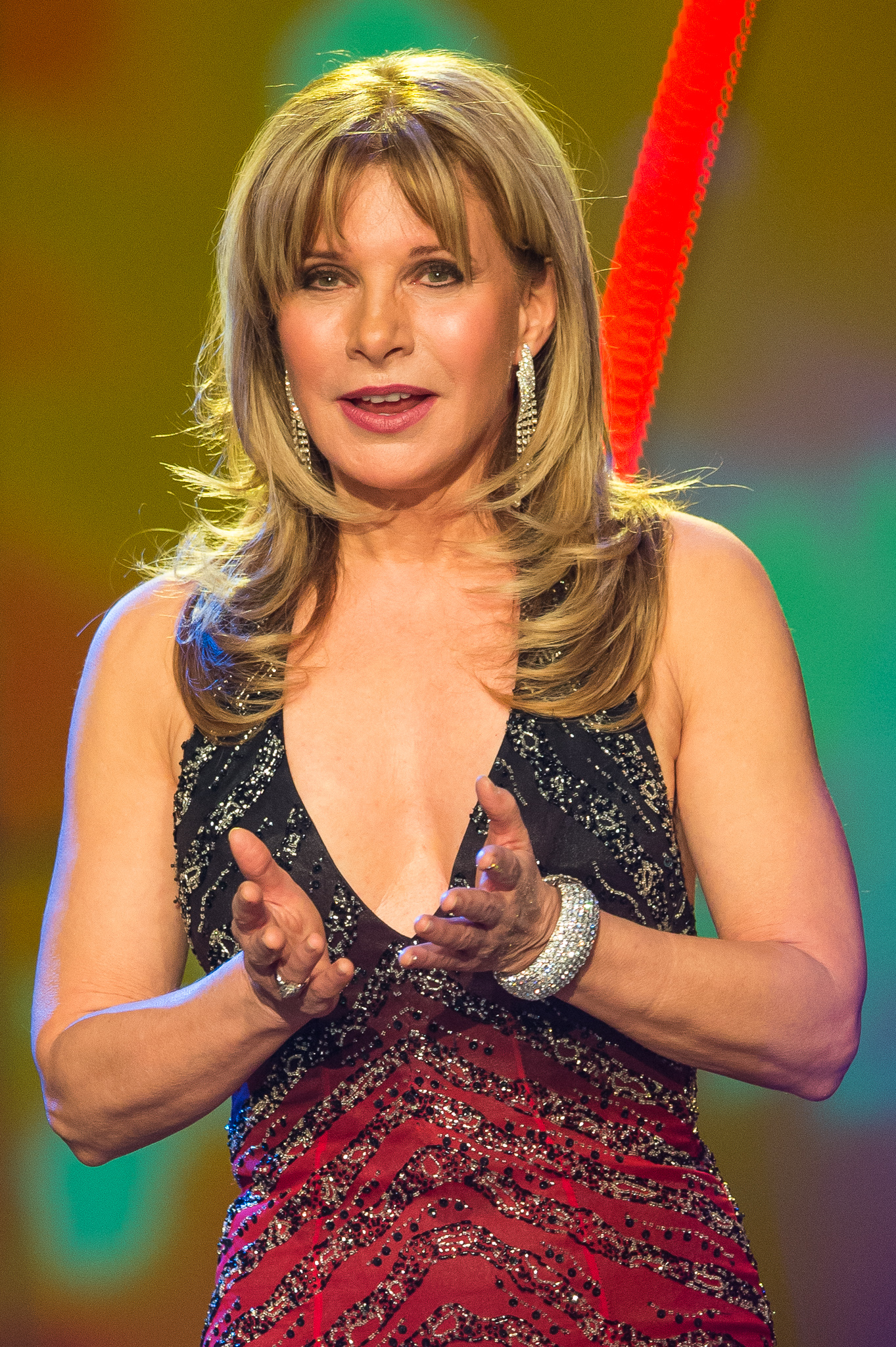
- Sasson at the Sternstunden Gala of BR, 2014
- Born: Deborah Ann O'Brien; Boston, U.S.
- Education: Oberlin College; New England Conservatory of Music
- Occupations: operatic soprano; musical actress; composer

Deborah Sasson née Deborah Ann O'Brien is an American operatic soprano, musical theatre actress and composer, mostly active in Germany. She graduated Millis High School. She worked also in pop music. She was Miss Massachusetts and a runner up in Miss America the same year.

== Life and career ==
Deborah Ann O'Brien was born in Boston. As a teenager she sang in a high school band. After high school, she studied classical singing at Oberlin College in Oberlin, Ohio with Ellen Repp and Helen Hodam; she studied further at the New England Conservatory of Music with Gladys Miller, graduating as a Master of Music. She began as a concert singer. She was a finalist of the Metropolitan Opera National Council Auditions. She made her debut on Broadway in Show Boat. Leonard Bernstein saw her performance and cast her in the role of Maria in a production of his West Side Story at the Hamburg State Opera which started her career in Germany.

She was a member of the ensemble of the Theater Aachen from 1979 to 1982, and appeared as a guest at the am Deutsche Oper Berlin, La Fenice in Venice and the San Francisco Opera. Her roles included Mozart's Despina in Così fan tutte and Zerlina in Don Giovanni, Donizetti's Norina in Don Pasquale and Adina L'elisir d'amore, Rossini's Rosina in The Barber of Seville and Verdi's Gilda in Rigoletto.

Sasson appeared at the Bayreuth Festival as a Flower Maiden in Parsifal first in 1982, alongside Peter Hofmann in the title role who was to become her husband. She performed the role until 1989. She recorded with Hofmann a duet version of Scarborough Fair as part of her album Rock Classics.

Sasson later turned to musical theatre again and popular music, and from 1988 has worked in pop music. She has released album such as (Carmen) Danger in Her Eyes and Passion and Pain that achieved chart placements. She wrote in 2010, together with Jochen Sautter, a musical Das Phantom der Oper and appeared in the role of Christine, touring in Germany for several years. Again with Sautter, she wrote a musical Der kleine Prinz, based on Le Petit Prince, in 2015, which was performed at theatres in Germany and Switzerland.

=== Personal life ===
She was first married to the conductor Michel Sasson. She was married to the tenor Peter Hofmann from 1983 to 1990.

Sasson gives solo concerts with her own ensemble; she performed in a duo programme with the opera singer Gunther Emmerlich.

== Recordings ==
Sasson appeared in a recording of Mahler's Eighth Symphony from the Tanglewood Music Festival, conducted by Seiji Ozawa in 1980.
