= International Academy of Osteopathy =

International school offering academic training in osteopathy

The International Academy of Osteopathy (IAO) was founded in 1987 by Grégoire Lason who still is the Principal. Since january 2025 Yourik van Overloop joined the IAO as Joint-Principal.

The IAO is an international college that offers its Training and Education in Austria, Belgium, Denmark, Germany and the Netherlands which leads to several degrees in osteopathy:

- Diploma in Osteopathy (DO),
- Master of Science in Osteopathy (MSc.Ost.) in co-operation with Buckinghamshire New University. This Master degree is a legally recognized diploma in over 45 European countries. Within the Master’s programme, students have the opportunity at the end of the second year to choose whether they wish to continue toward the Master of Science in Osteopathy, or instead pursue the DO qualification.
- Lateral Entry Program for people who already hold a DO, enabling them to obtain a Master of Science in Osteopathy within a minimum of two academic years, delivered in collaboration with Buckinghamshire New University.
- Post Graduate Certificates of the IAO,
- Post Graduate Certificates of Buckinghamshire New University.

The programs are accredited thanks to agreements with Buckinghamshire New University and are in accordance with the Bologna process.

== Austria (AT) ==
Master of Science in Osteopathy (MSc.Ost.)

- In German in Innsbruck and Wien. This is a part-time training and education for physiotherapists and medical doctors. After successfully completing this 4-year program, students obtain the unique British Master of Science in Osteopathy (MSc.Ost.), from Buckinghamshire New University, as well as the DO degree from The International Academy of Osteopathy (IAO) and a certificate in Osteopathic Manipulative Techniques. Within the Master’s programme, students also have the opportunity at the end of the second year to choose whether they wish to continue toward the Master of Science in Osteopathy, or instead pursue the DO qualification.

Lateral Entry Program

- In German in Innsbruck and Wien. For people who already hold a DO, enabling them to obtain a Master of Science in Osteopathy within a minimum of two academic years, delivered in collaboration with Buckinghamshire New University.

Several Postacademic Modules (PAM)

- These modules are for osteopaths with minimum DO wanting to stay on top of the scientific evolutions within the profession.

== Belgium (BE) ==
Master of Science in Osteopathy (MSc.Ost.)

- In Dutch in Antwerp and Ghent. This is a part-time training and education for physiotherapists and medical doctors. After successfully completing this 4-year program, students obtain the unique British Master of Science in Osteopathy (MSc.Ost.), from Buckinghamshire New University, as well as the DO degree from The International Academy of Osteopathy (IAO) and a certificate in Osteopathic Manipulative Techniques. Within the Master’s programme, students also have the opportunity at the end of the second year to choose whether they wish to continue toward the Master of Science in Osteopathy, or instead pursue the DO qualification.

Lateral Entry Program

- In Dutch in Antwerp and Ghent. For people who already hold a DO, enabling them to obtain a Master of Science in Osteopathy within a minimum of two academic years, delivered in collaboration with Buckinghamshire New University.

Diploma in Osteopathy (DO)

- In French in Mont-Saint-Guibert. This is a part-time training and education for physiotherapists and medical doctors. After successfully completing this 5-year program, students obtain the DO degree from The International Academy of Osteopathy (IAO).

Manual Therapy Course

- Consisting of seven modules, each focused on a specific body region and covering both theoretical and practical components; participants receive a “Manual Therapy” certificate upon completion.

Several Postacademic Modules (PAM)

- These modules are for osteopaths with minimum DO wanting to stay on top of the scientific evolutions within the profession.

== Denmark (DK) ==
Master of Science in Osteopathy (MSc.Ost.)

- In English in Copenhagen. This is a part-time training and education for physiotherapists and medical doctors. After successfully completing this 4-year program, students obtain the unique British Master of Science in Osteopathy (MSc.Ost.), from Buckinghamshire New University, as well as the DO degree from The International Academy of Osteopathy (IAO) and a certificate in Osteopathic Manipulative Techniques. Within the Master’s programme, students also have the opportunity at the end of the second year to choose whether they wish to continue toward the Master of Science in Osteopathy, or instead pursue the DO qualification.

Lateral Entry Program

- In English in Copenhagen. For people who already hold a DO, enabling them to obtain a Master of Science in Osteopathy within a minimum of two academic years, delivered in collaboration with Buckinghamshire New University.

Several Postacademic Modules (PAM):

- These modules are for osteopaths with DO wanting to stay on top of scientific evolutions within the profession.

== Germany (DE) ==
Master of Science in Osteopathy

- In German in Osnabruck and München. This is a part-time training and education for physiotherapists and medical doctors. After successfully completing this 5-year program, students obtain the DO degree from The International Academy of Osteopathy (IAO) and a certificate in Osteopathic Manipulative Techniques. Within the Master’s programme, students also have the opportunity at the end of the second year to choose whether they wish to continue toward the Master of Science in Osteopathy, or instead pursue the DO qualification.

Several Postacademic Modules (PAM):

- These modules are for osteopaths with DO wanting to stay on top of scientific evolutions within the profession.

== The Netherlands (NL) ==
Master of Science in Osteopathy (MSc.Ost.)

- In Dutch in Zeist. This is a part-time training and education for physiotherapists and medical doctors. After successfully completing this 4-year program, students obtain the unique British Master of Science in Osteopathy (MSc.Ost.), from Buckinghamshire New University, as well as the DO degree from The International Academy of Osteopathy (IAO) and a certificate in Osteopathic Manipulative Techniques. Within the Master’s programme, students also have the opportunity at the end of the second year to choose whether they wish to continue toward the Master of Science in Osteopathy, or instead pursue the DO qualification.

Lateral Entry Program

- In Dutch in Zeist. For people who already hold a DO, enabling them to obtain a Master of Science in Osteopathy within a minimum of two academic years, delivered in collaboration with Buckinghamshire New University.

Several Postacademic Modules (PAM):

- These modules are for osteopaths with minimum DO wanting to stay on top of the scientific evolutions within the profession.
