= Elbtunnel =

Elbtunnel may refer to:

- Elbe Tunnel (1911), a pedestrian and vehicle tunnel in Hamburg
- Elbe Tunnel (1975), a subterranean Elbe River crossing in northern Germany located in Hamburg
