= Elbe Tunnel =

Elbe tunnel most commonly refers to:

- Elbe Tunnel (1975) in Hamburg, which is part of Bundesautobahn 7.
- Elbe Tunnel (1911) in Hamburg, which connects St. Pauli and Steinwerder.

It may also refer to:

- A tunnel projected near Glückstadt, which will be part of Bundesautobahn 20.
- A tunnel proposed as an alternative to the disputed Dresden Waldschlösschen Bridge.
