= Martina (tunnel boring machine) =

Tunnel boring machine

The Martina tunnel boring machine (officially named as the S-574.) is a hard rock tunnel boring machine built by Herrenknecht AG. It is the largest hard rock tunnel boring machine in the world and has been used for drilling the Sparvo Tunnel, a part of the larger Variante di Valico project in Italy.

== Specifications and operations ==
The Martina cost 60 million USD, has a shield diameter of 15.55 metres, an excavation diameter of 15.62 metres, a length of 130 metres, a total weight of 4500 tonnes and an annual operating consumption of 62 million kWh. The cutterhead required 12,000 kW of power whilst the overall vehicle requires 18 MW total installed capacity to function. The machine started work on the Sparvo tunnel in 2011, with drilling of the 2430-metre north tube completed in 2012. The drilling of the 2600-metre south tube was finished in 2013, bringing the 5-kilometre tunneling project to an end.

== See also ==
- List of longest tunnels
- List of long tunnels by type
- List of mining companies
