= Altonaer Museum =

Museum in Germany

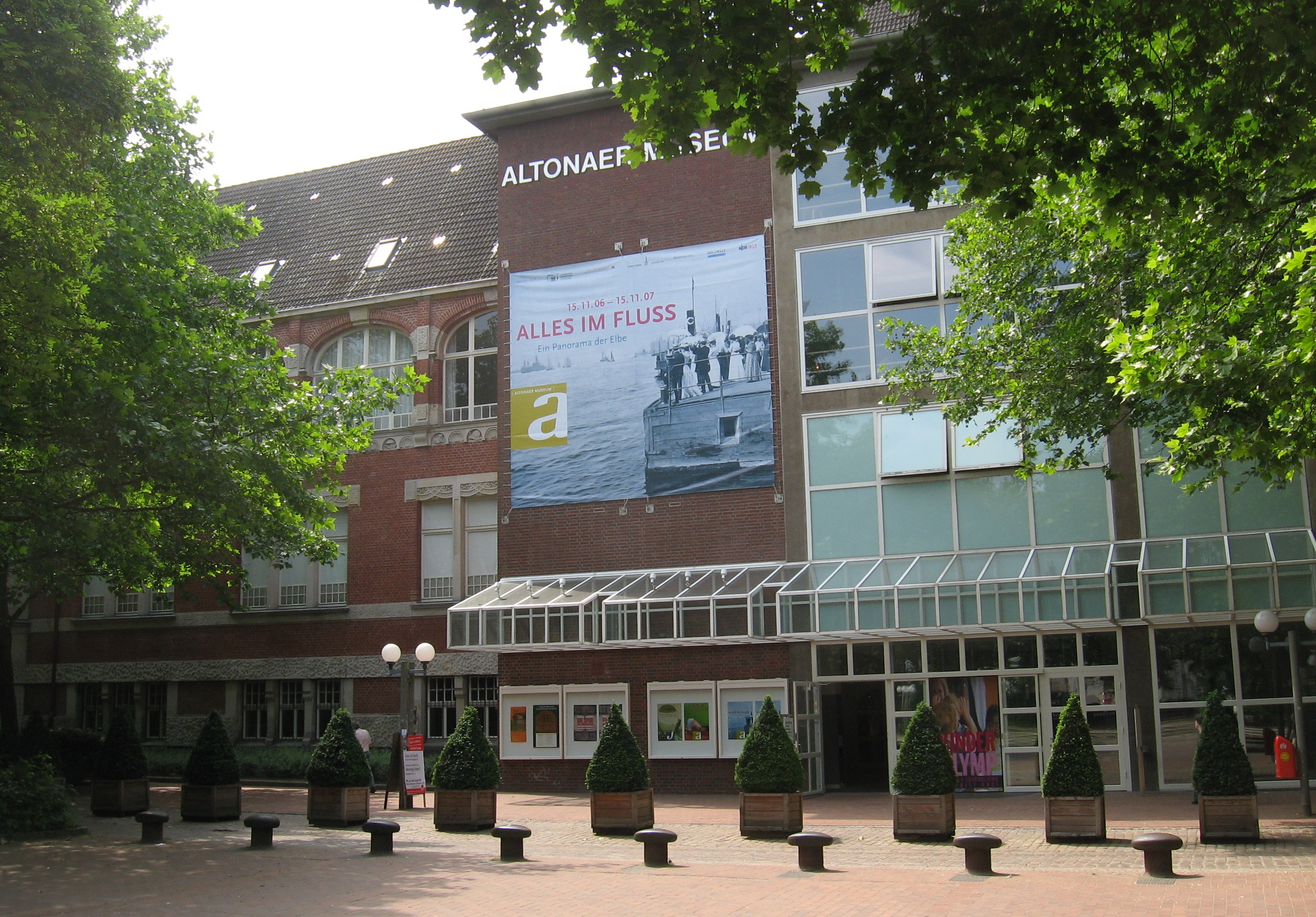
- Entrance to Altonaer Museum
- Established: 1863
- Location: Altona, Hamburg
- Coordinates: 53°32′56″N 9°56′4″E
- Type: Art gallery
- Website: www.altonaermuseum.de

Altonaer Museum is an art museum in the suburb of Altona in Hamburg, Germany. The museum association was established in 1863, when Altona was still part of Denmark. The museum has a collection of over 300 000 objects connected to the cultural history of Northern Germany.

== History ==
In February 1863 the Altonaer pastor Georg Schaar - alongside others including the naturalist Carl Christian Gottsche and the shipowner Ernst Dreyer - founded a private society for the construction of a museum, which at that time was located at Palmaille 112. Originally it was mainly composed of botanical collections. In 1888 it was briefly closed due to 'failure to meet the public interest' (Versagens des öffentlichen Interesses), and was later taken over by the city. Altona, which had developed into a large industrial city with 180,000 inhabitants (1890) wanted to present itself through representative institutions, which in those days included a museum.

A new building, situated between the new town hall and the new railway station on the Kaiserplatz (now Platz der Republik/Museumstraße), was inaugurated on 16 September 1901. For its expansion, a concept was developed by Altonaer teacher Otto Lehmann that placed Schleswig-Holstein regional and folklore studies at the centre of the "Folk Education Museum", thus setting it apart from the museums in the neighbouring city of Hamburg, which had more of a large-scale claim (Der Tor zur Welt; 'The Gateway to the World'). On 1 April 1899, Lehmann was appointed as full-time director of the museum and held this post until 31 October 1931. In 1906 he was granted the title of professor. In 1909, he became a founding member of the Altonaer Artists' Association.

The intent of the museum was to show visitors the development of Schleswig-Holstein in its relationship to nature and society through natural history and cultural history exhibits, which could also consist of replicas and stagings ('Lebensbilder', or 'life pictures'); clarity was more important to this concept than the completeness of the natural science exhibits. The museum also offered exhibition spaces to young artists of the time, museum guides on particular topics and a café ('Erfrischungsraum', or 'refreshment room') for visitors.

As the concept met with considerable visitor interest, the museum was expanded to twice its original size in August 1914 on the occasion of the 250th anniversary of the city.

In 1998–99, the museum was transferred from state sponsorship to the foundation under public law Altonaer Museum in Hamburg - Norddeutsches Landesmuseum and finally became part of the Hamburg Historical Museums Foundation on 1 January 2008.

=== Directors ===
Lehmann's successor was Hubert Stierling, who held the post until 1949. Stierling was succeeded by Günther Grundmann who held the position from 1950 to 1959. In 2013, Hans-Jörg Czech succeeded Torkild Hinrichsen and Bärbel Hedinger, respectively. On 1 January 2017, Anja Dauschek took over as director.

== See also ==
- Elisabeth von Dücker
