= Elisabeth von Dücker =

Elisabeth von Dücker (25 February 1946, Miltenberg; — 9 July 2020. Hamburg) was a German art historian. She worked as curator at the Altonaer Museum and at the Hamburg Museum der Arbeit. The themes of her exhibition projects were city history and women's work. She founded the “FrauenFreiluftGalerie Hamburg” in 1994.

== Life ==
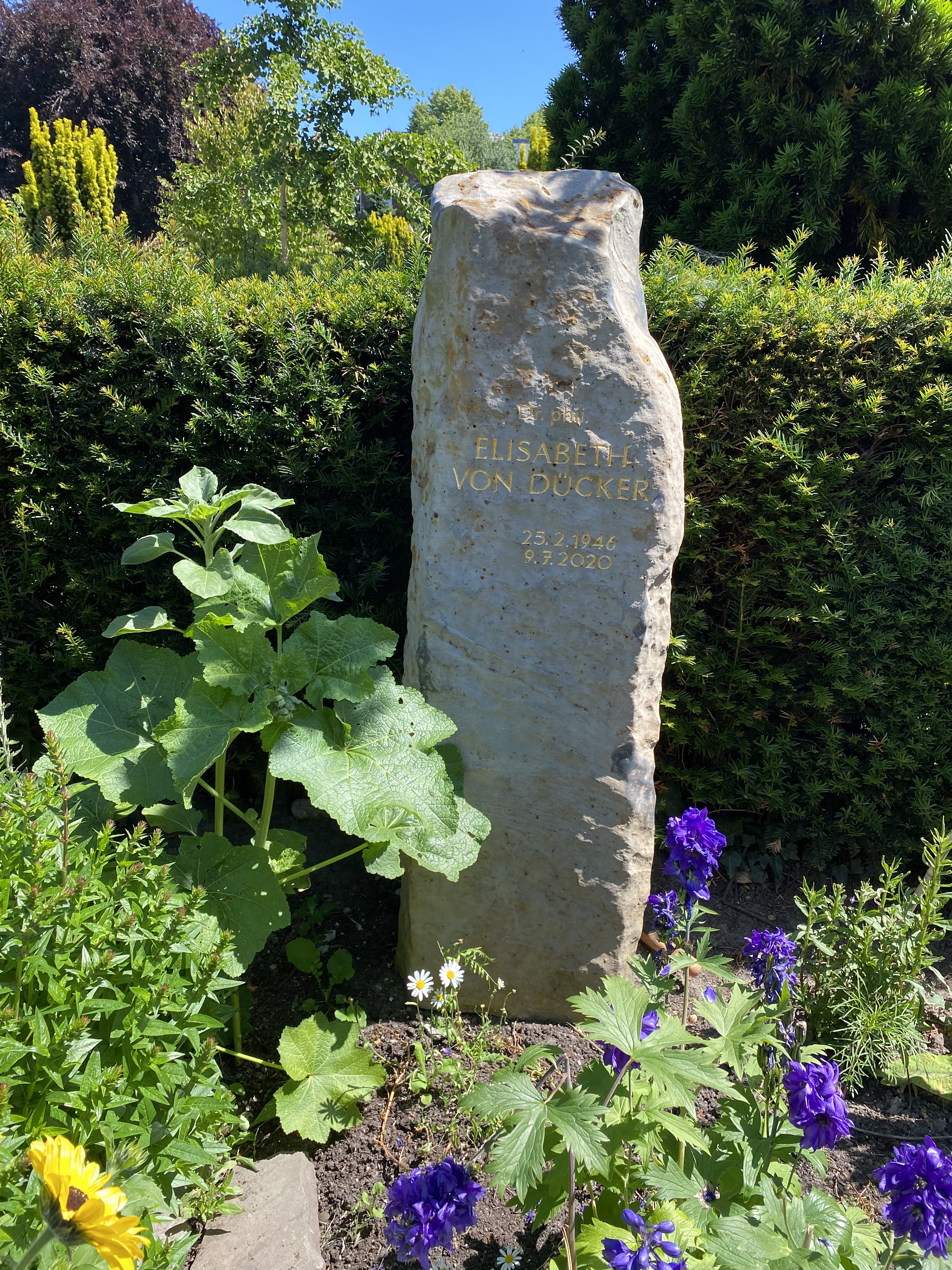
Gravesite of Elisabeth von Dücker

Von Dücker studied art history as well as ethnic studies and classical archeology in West Berlin and Frankfurt am Main. Parallel to her studies, she trained to become a bookseller. From 1970 she lived in Hamburg.

From 1975 onwards she completed a scientific traineeship at the Altonaer Museum. Her politicization in the women's movement also began in 1975 when she joined a group that demonstrated against abortion paragraph §218. In 1978 she was awarded a Dr. phil. received his doctorate. Her dissertation dealt with the painted oeuvre of the cartoonist Thomas Theodor Heine, one of the founders of the Munich magazine Simplicissimus. In 1980 she was co-founder of the Stadtteilarchiv Ottensen (Ottensen district archive) as the first history workshop in Hamburg.

She is buried in the Bernadottestraße Cemetery in the Ottensen district of Hamburg.

== Career ==
As a research trainee at the Altona Museum, she designed an exhibition about the proletarian Hamburg district of Ottensen with the participation of local residents as an everyday history of a neighbourhood. The exhibition “Ottensen. On the history of a district” was so successful with over 70,000 visitors that Elisabeth von Dücker was hired as a permanent curator.

In 1986 she moved to the Hamburg Museum der Arbeit, which was currently being set up, as a museum scientist. She was responsible for the area of everyday life and women's history. On a voluntary basis, she initiated the “Working Group for Women in the Museum of Work”, from which the “Working Group Mural” was formed, which, after three years of research, realized the mural “Women's Work in the Port of Hamburg” in 1989. The occasion was the 800th birthday of the Port of Hamburg. Painters created a 1,000 square meter painting on the north facade of the so-called Fischmarktspeicher, a former granary, at Große Elbstraße 39. The project, located at the interface of research, art and politics, was discussed nationally between approval and opposition . Der Spiegel wrote: “The monumental work, crowned by a combative-looking welder, reminded scoffers of Socialist Realism. The Hamburg “heroine of work,” complained the alternative Tageszeitung, could also “decorate the wall of a state-owned company in the GDR.”

The mural Companiera followed in 1992, which was dedicated to women's work in Latin America. When the warehouse was converted into an office building, the murals were demolished in 1994. Only photographs have survived.

With the mural painter Hildegund Schuster and the social scientist Emilija Mitrovic (1953–2020) from the working group and in cooperation with the Museum für Arbeit, she developed the concept of the “FrauenFreiluftGalerie Hamburg” in 1994. The conception and design of the gallery is based not only on archival research but also on oral history research, which was carried out with contemporary witnesses in over 100 interviews. Sixteen murals were created along the hillside on the Altona Elbe bank on the way to Neumühlen, which tell stories about port-related women's work from 1900 to the present. Artists from Hamburg and overseas designed the paintings in various styles on industrial-historical buildings and walls. The mural for the concentration camp workers in the harbor The Women from Dessauer Ufer was realized on a building owned by the city-owned Hamburg-Altonaer Fischerhafen GmbH in Ottensen, which was dedicated to the Hungarian and Czech Jewish women in the Women's Camp of the Neuengamme Concentration Camp in Hamburg-Veddel are remembered. In 2010, Hildegund Schuster created the mural “Women in the Port Logistics” along the inside of the retaining wall in front of Port Station Große Elbstraße 276. Since 2011, the painting Women at Sea - Seawomen then and now has been on the brick walls of Neumühlen pumping station No. 69.

As part of the official opening of the Museum of Work on the site of the former rubber goods factory New-York Hamburger Gummi-Waaren Compagnie in Barmbeck in 1997, the 400 square meter building by Elisabeth von Dücker was opened on the second floor A separate permanent exhibition “Women and Men – Worlds of Work and Worlds of Images” was installed. In later years this department was dismantled.

Three years after the new Prostitution Act came into force, Elisabeth von Dücker, now senior custodian of the Museum of Work, curated Europe's first cultural-historical exhibition on prostitution and prostitutes in 2005 under the title “Sex work. Prostitution - Life Worlds and Myths" with around 500 exhibits from the period from 1850 to 2005. For the show and the accompanying catalog she conducted 30 interviews with people from the milieu and cooperated with advisory institutions and projects of the sex workers' rights movement in Germany, Holland, and Italy. Supported by the sociologists Beate Leopold and Christiane Howe, Elisabeth von Dücker set up twelve rooms, each of which provided information about an aspect of prostitution, such as “health”, “law and customs”, the “fight for respect”, “customer, guest, John”, “Drug Prostitution and Trafficking in Women”. One room addressed the Nazi era with photos and documents on black walls, including the “prostitution room” in the Buchenwald concentration camp. The exhibition was also shown in Berlin and Bonn. It is considered the most successful in Elisabeth von Dücker's life's work.

She retired in 2007. When the Altona Museum was to be closed in 2010, she was one of the speakers for the citizens' initiative “Altona Museum Remains”. Due to the many protests, the Hamburg Senate revised its decision.
