= Tunnel boring machine =

Device used to excavate tunnels

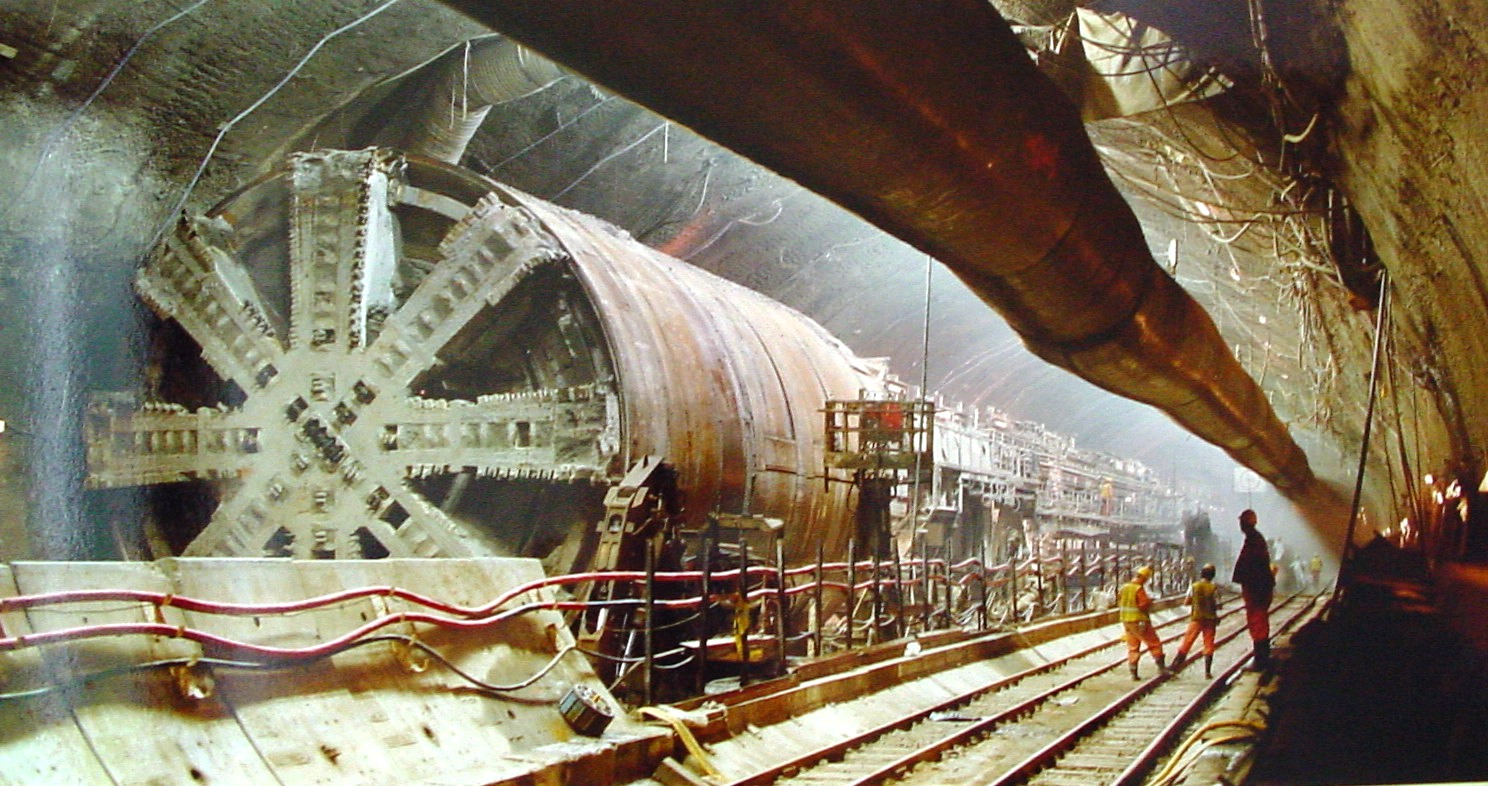
One of the boring machines used for the Channel Tunnel between France and the United Kingdom

A tunnel boring machine (TBM), also known as a "mole", is a machine used to excavate tunnels. TBMs are an alternative to drilling and blasting methods and "hand mining", allowing more rapid excavation through hard rock, wet or dry soil, or sand (although each requires specialized TBM technologies). TBM-bored tunnel cross-sections extend up to 17.6 meters (58 ft) (through June 2023). TBM tunnels are typically circular in cross-section. Specialized tunnel boring machines have been developed to excavate non-circular tunnels, including rectangular and horseshoe-shaped profiles. Much narrower tunnels are typically bored using trenchless construction methods or horizontal directional drilling rather than by TBMs.

TBMs limit disturbance to the surrounding ground and produce a smooth tunnel wall, which reduces the cost of lining the tunnel and allows for tunneling in urban areas. Large TBMs are expensive and challenging to construct and transport, and have fixed costs which become less significant for longer tunnels. Tunneling speeds generally decline as tunnel size increases, but tunneling speeds using TBMs have nevertheless increased over time. TBM speeds excavating through rock can, in the 21st century, reach over 700 meters per week, while soil tunneling machines can exceed 200 meters per week.

== History ==
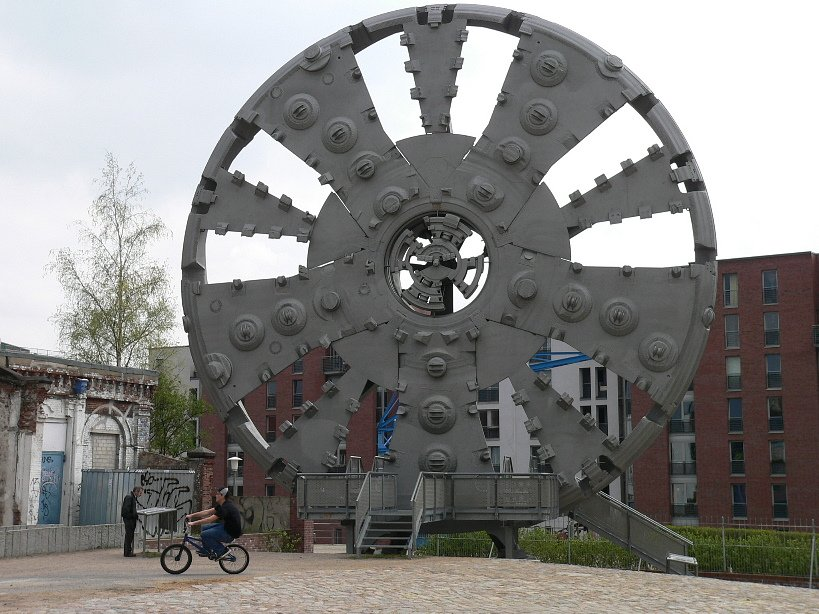
Cutting shield used for the New Elbe Tunnel

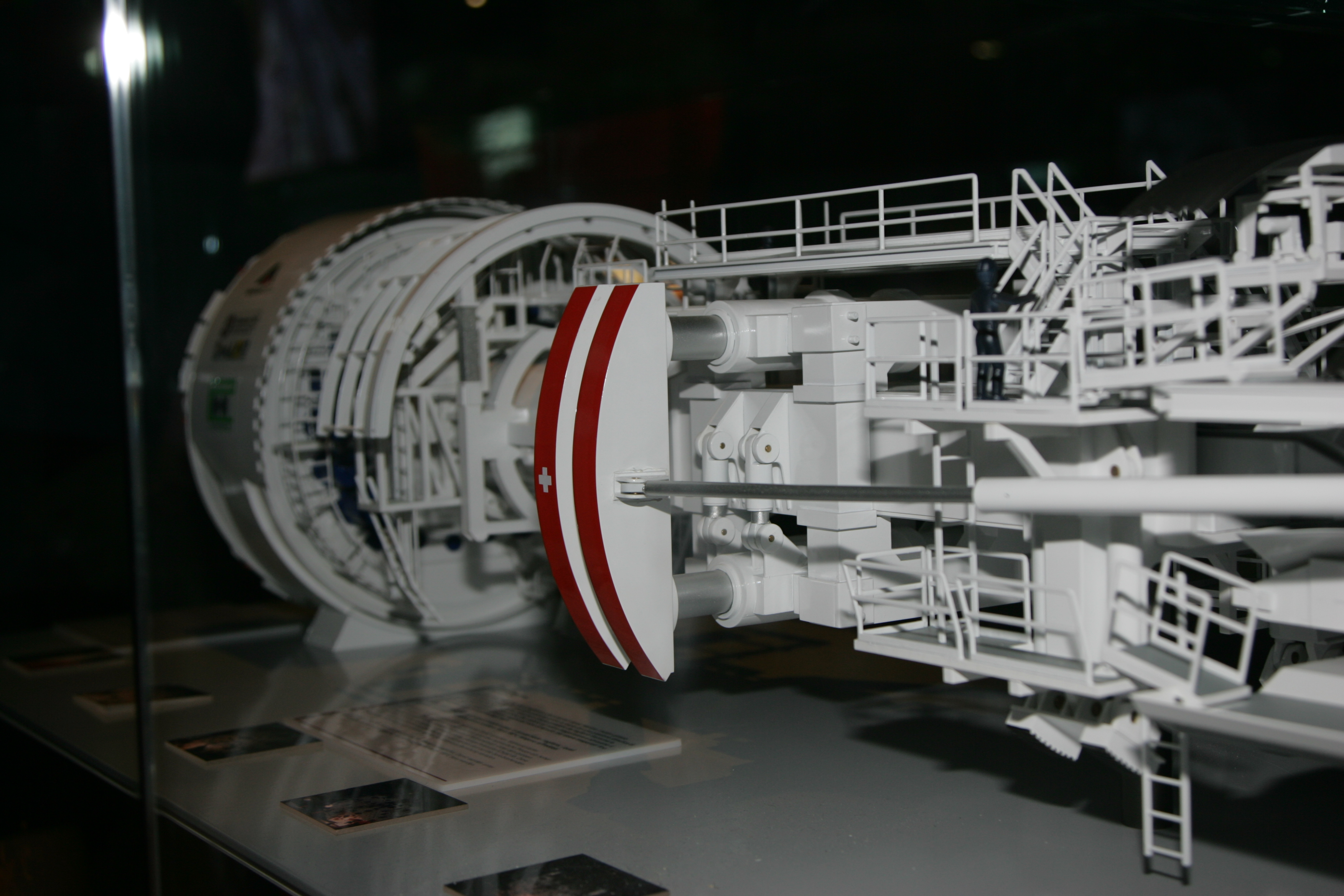
Looking towards the cutting shield at the hydraulic jacks

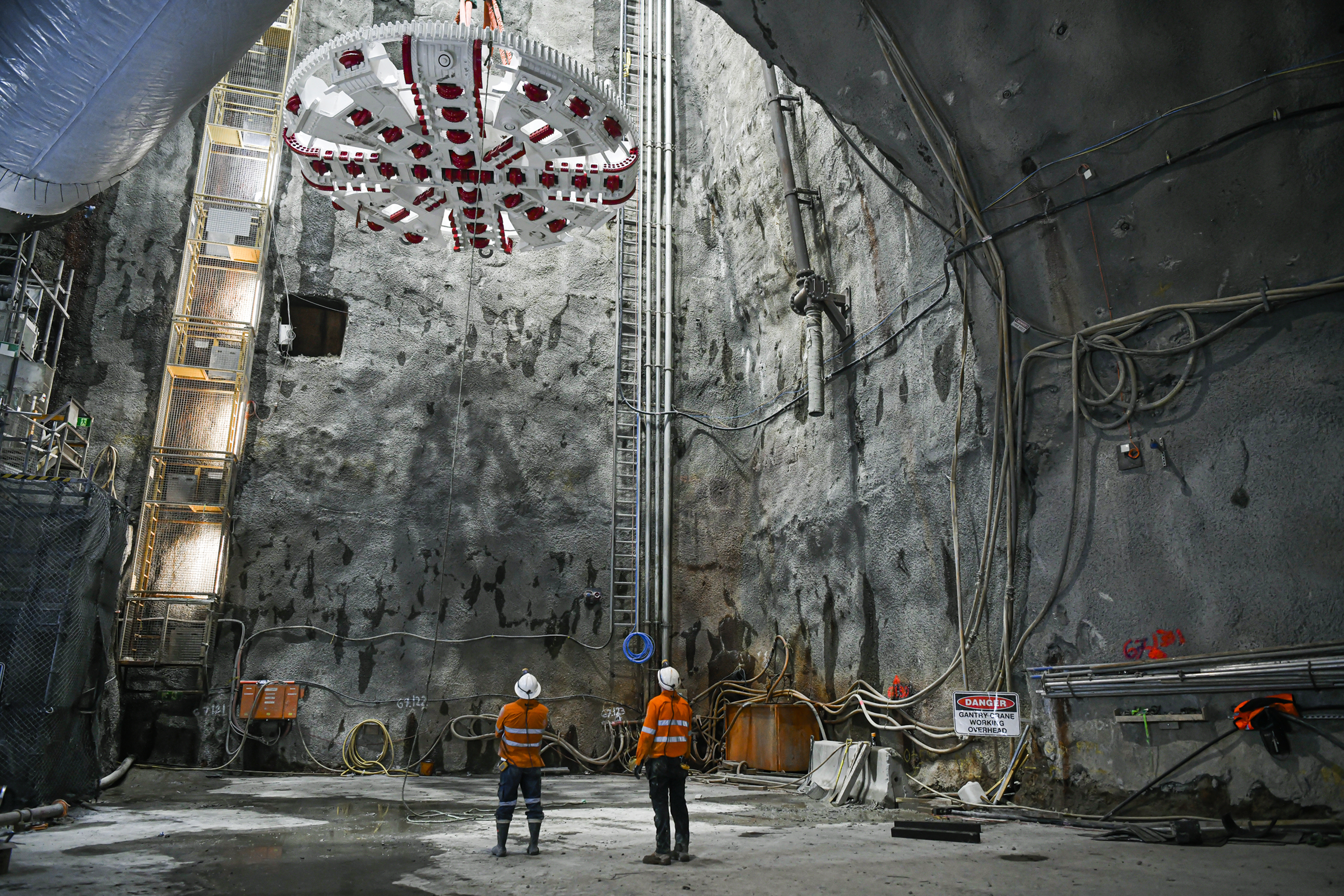
A tunnel boring machine cutter head being lowered underground for the construction of the City & Southwest line of the Sydney Metro

=== 1800s ===
The first successful tunnelling shield was developed by Sir Marc Isambard Brunel to excavate the Thames Tunnel in 1825. However, this was only the invention of the shield concept and did not involve the construction of a complete tunnel boring machine, the digging still having to be accomplished by the then standard excavation methods.

The first boring machine reported to have been built was Henri Maus' Mountain Slicer. Commissioned by the King of Sardinia in 1845 to dig the Fréjus Rail Tunnel between France and Italy through the Alps, Maus had it built in 1846 in an arms factory near Turin, Italy. It consisted of more than 100 percussion drills mounted in the front of a locomotive-sized machine, mechanically power-driven from the entrance of the tunnel. The Revolutions of 1848 affected the funding, and the tunnel was not completed until 10 years later, by using less innovative and less expensive methods such as pneumatic drills.

In the United States, the first boring machine to have been built was used in 1853 during the construction of the Hoosac Tunnel in northwest Massachusetts. Made of cast iron, it was known as Wilson's Patented Stone-Cutting Machine, after inventor Charles Wilson. It drilled 3 meters (10 ft) into the rock before breaking down (the tunnel was eventually completed more than 20 years later, and as with the Fréjus Rail Tunnel, by using less ambitious methods). Wilson's machine anticipated modern TBMs in the sense that it employed cutting discs, like those of a disc harrow, which were attached to the rotating head of the machine. In contrast to traditional chiseling or drilling and blasting, this innovative method of removing rock relied on simple metal wheels to apply a transient high pressure that fractured the rock.

In 1853, the American Ebenezer Talbot also patented a TBM that employed Wilson's cutting discs, although they were mounted on rotating arms, which in turn were mounted on a rotating plate. In the 1870s, John D. Brunton of England built a machine employing cutting discs that were mounted eccentrically on rotating plates, which in turn were mounted eccentrically on a rotating plate, so that the cutting discs would travel over almost all of the rock face that was to be removed.

The first TBM that tunneled a substantial distance was invented in 1863 and improved in 1875 by British Army officer Major Frederick Edward Blackett Beaumont (1833–1895); Beaumont's machine was further improved in 1880 by British Army officer Major Thomas English (1843–1935). In 1875, the French National Assembly approved the construction of a tunnel under the English Channel and the British Parliament supported a trial run using English's TBM. Its cutter head consisted of a conical drill bit behind which were a pair of opposing arms on which were mounted cutting discs. From June 1882 to March 1883, the machine tunneled, through chalk, a total of 1,840 m (6,036 ft). A French engineer, Alexandre Lavalley, who was also a Suez Canal contractor, used a similar machine to drill 1,669 m (5,476 ft) from Sangatte on the French side. However, despite this success, the cross-Channel tunnel project was abandoned in 1883 after the British military raised fears that the tunnel might be used as an invasion route. Nevertheless, in 1883, this TBM was used to bore a railway ventilation tunnel – 2 m (7 ft) in diameter and 2.06 km (6,750 ft) long – between Birkenhead and Liverpool, England, through sandstone under the Mersey River.

Construction of the Uptown Hudson Tubes for the Hudson & Manhattan Railroad took place intermittently between 1890 and 1908, using a Greathead Shield. The project used air compressed to 2.4 bar (35 psi) to reduce cave-ins. However, there were many workers that died via cave-in or decompression sickness.

=== 1900s ===
During the late 19th and early 20th century, inventors continued to design, build, and test TBMs for tunnels for railroads, subways, sewers, water supplies, etc. TBMs employing rotating arrays of drills or hammers were patented. TBMs that resembled giant hole saws were proposed. Other TBMs consisted of a rotating drum with metal tines on its outer surface, or a rotating circular plate covered with teeth, or revolving belts covered with metal teeth. However, these TBMs proved expensive, cumbersome, and unable to excavate hard rock; interest in TBMs therefore declined. Nevertheless, TBM development continued in potash and coal mines, where the rock was softer.

A TBM with a bore diameter of 14.4 m (47 ft 3 in) was manufactured by The Robbins Company for Canada's Niagara Tunnel Project. The machine was used to bore a hydroelectric tunnel beneath Niagara Falls. The machine was named "Big Becky" in reference to the Sir Adam Beck hydroelectric dams to which it tunneled to provide an additional hydroelectric tunnel.

=== 2000s ===
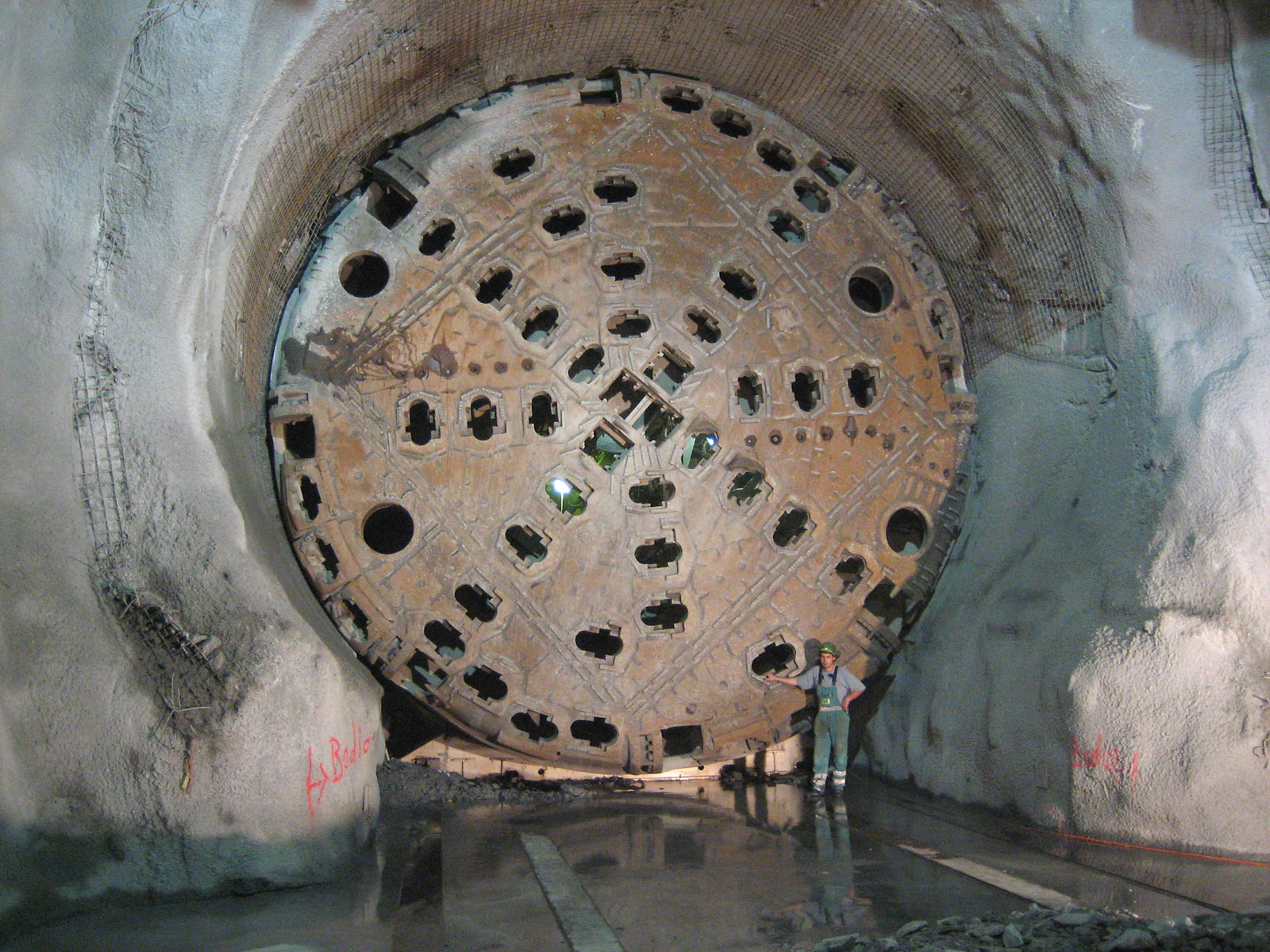
A tunnel boring machine used to excavate the Gotthard Base Tunnel, Switzerland, the world's longest rail tunnel

The TBM known as Bertha, reportedly the largest earth pressure balance machine and second largest TBM in general (as of June 2023), has a bore diameter of 17.45 meters (57.3 ft), and was produced by Hitachi Zosen Corporation in 2013. It was delivered to Seattle, Washington, for its Highway 99 tunnel project. The machine began operating in July 2013, but stalled in December 2013 and required substantial repairs that halted the machine until January 2016. Bertha completed boring the tunnel on April 4, 2017.

Two TBMs supplied after the 2013 acquisition of Germany's Aker Wirth (Aker Solutions) TBM and shaft-boring technology by China Railway Tunnelling Equipment (CRTE), now CREG (China Railway Engineering Equipment Group)-Germany, CREG-Wirth units with boring diameter of 6.67 m (21.9 ft), were used to bore two tunnels for Kuala Lumpur, Malaysia's Metro system. The medium excavated was water "saturated sandy mudstone, schistose mudstone, highly weathered mudstone as well as alluvium". By the company's commercial description, its products achieved an advance rate of "more than 345 meters [1,130 feet] per month".

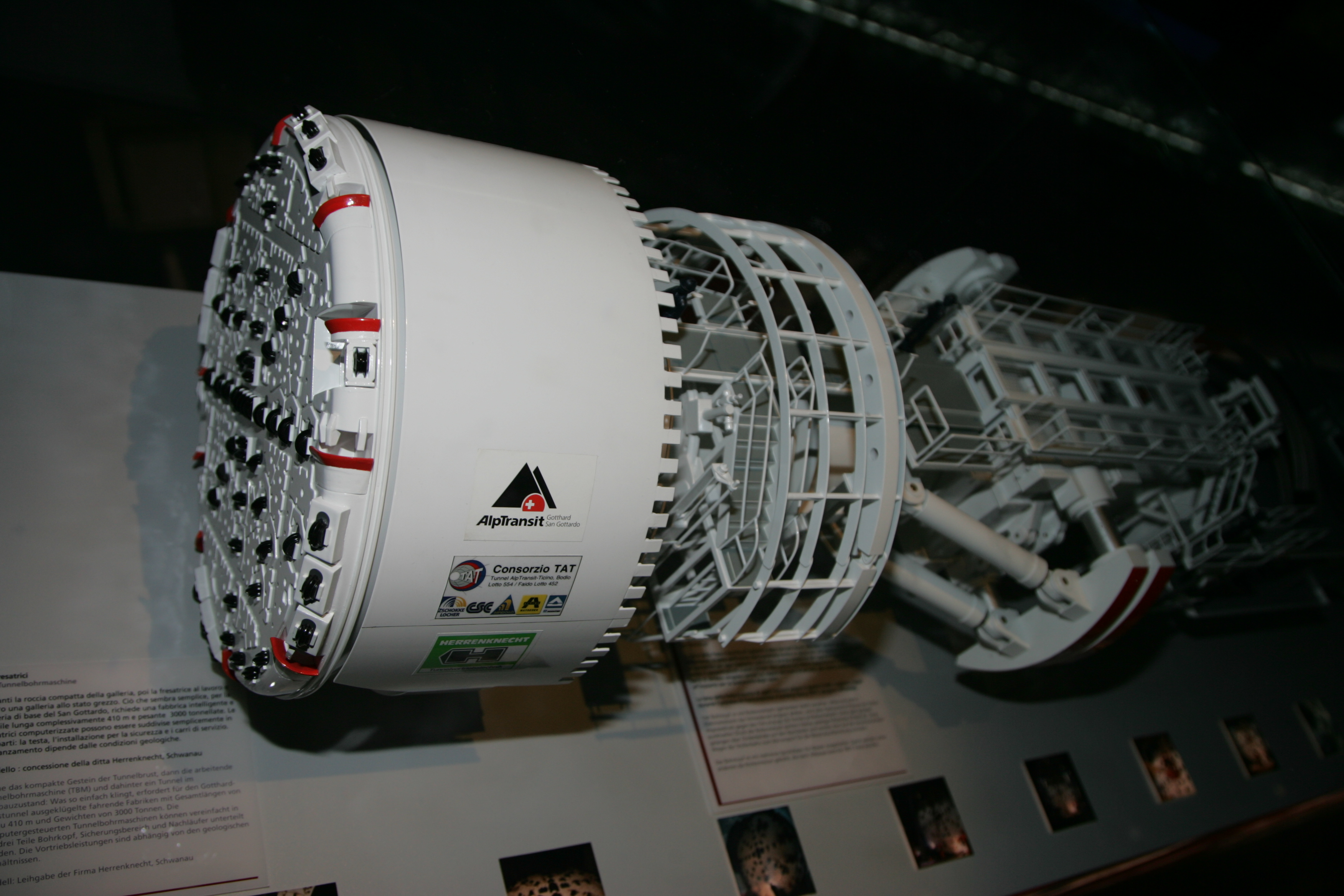
Top view of a model of the TBM used on the Gotthard Base Tunnel.

Reportedly the largest hard rock machine and fourth largest TBM overall (as of June 2023), a machine known as Martina, was built by Herrenknecht AG. Its excavation diameter is 15.62 m (51.2 ft), and total length 130 m (430 ft); excavation area of 192 m^{2} (2,070 sq ft), and thrust value 39,485 t, total weight 4,500 tons, and total installed capacity 18 MW. Its yearly energy consumption was about 62 GWh. Martina was used by the Italian Toto Group construction company (Toto S.p.A Costruczioni General) to bore a 2.4 km tunnel of the Variante di Valico project near Florence, Italy, in 2013. This project created the Sparvo gallery of the Italian Motorway Pass A1 ("Variante di Valico A1"), near Florence. As of this date, Martina was still owned and operated by the Toto Group.

Herrenknecht also built the world's largest-diameter slurry TBM and as of June 2023, per Guinness World Records, also the largest TBM overall; called the "Qin Liangyu" or Mixshield S-880, it has an excavation diameter of 17.63 meters (57.8 ft). Owned and operated by a subsidiary of the French construction company Bouygues (Dragages Hong Kong), it was used to bore the Chek Lap Kok to Tuen Mun road tunnel, undersea, to Hong Kong, China, clearing the first section of the tunnel at the large diameter, then being converted to 14 m, and working alongside three other TBMs (including another Herrenknecht borer) to complete the tunnels, 30 m undersea, in 2019. A robbins TBM in 2022 underwent an in-tunnel diameter change, that reduced the diameter of the TBM from 11.6 meters to 9.9 meters.

In 2026, China Railway Science & Industry Group (CRSIC) and Tsinghua University introduced Lucky Dragon, a 4.5 m (15 ft) diameter hard rock TBM that included a hybrid boring/blasting cutter head. It combined a standard cutterhead with a drilling system that used explosives to fracture to speed the boring process.

== Open machines ==
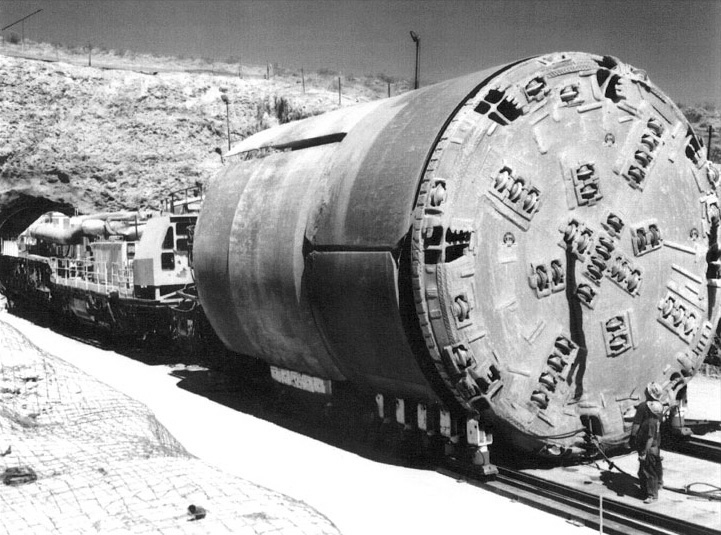
A tunnel boring machine that was used at Yucca Mountain nuclear waste repository

TBMs typically consist of a rotating cutting wheel in front, called a cutter head, followed by a main bearing, a thrust system, possibly a system to support the tunnel face, a system to remove excavated material (muck), support mechanisms, and in some cases, a liner installation system. Variants address site conditions, including geology, water presence, and other factors.

=== Open/gripper ===
Gripper TBMs are used in rock tunnels. They push directly against the unreinforced sides of the tunnel.

Machines such as a Wirth machine move only while the grips are released, while other machines move continuously. At the end of a Wirth boring cycle, legs drop to the ground, the grippers are retracted, and the machine advances. The grippers then reengage and the rear legs lift for the next cycle. Such TBMs can be steered by adjusting the relative length of the grippers.

=== Open face soft ground ===
Open face soft ground TBMs rely on the excavated ground to briefly stand without support. They are suitable for use in ground with strength of up to about 10 MPa (1,500 psi) with low water inflows. They can bore tunnels with cross-section in excess of 10 m (30 ft). A backactor arm or cutter head bore to within 150 mm (6 in) of the edge of the shield. Some TBMs allow the cutter head to be retracted for maintenance or to allow inspection of the cutting face.

== Cutterhead ==
Cutterheads vary by ground type:

- Open "star type" cutterheads are suitable for soft soils. The cutters scrape the ground away.
- Closed "disc type" cutterheads are suitable for hard rock. The discs spin to fracture rock into small pieces.
- Blasting cutterheads bore holes ahead of the machine, then inserting low yield, high velocity explosives into the borehole. The explosives fracture the rock (without damaging the cutterhead), allowing a disc type cutterhead to remove the fractured remnants.

== Tunnel-face support ==
In hard rock with minimal ground water, the area around the cutter head can be unpressurized, as the exposed rock face supports itself. In softer soil, or where ground water is significant, pressure must be applied to the face of the tunnel to prevent collapse and/or ground water infiltration into the machine. Earth pressure balance machines compete with slurry shield machines. EPBs are mostly used in finer ground (such as clay) while slurry shields are mostly used for coarser ground (such as gravel).

=== Earth pressure balance ===
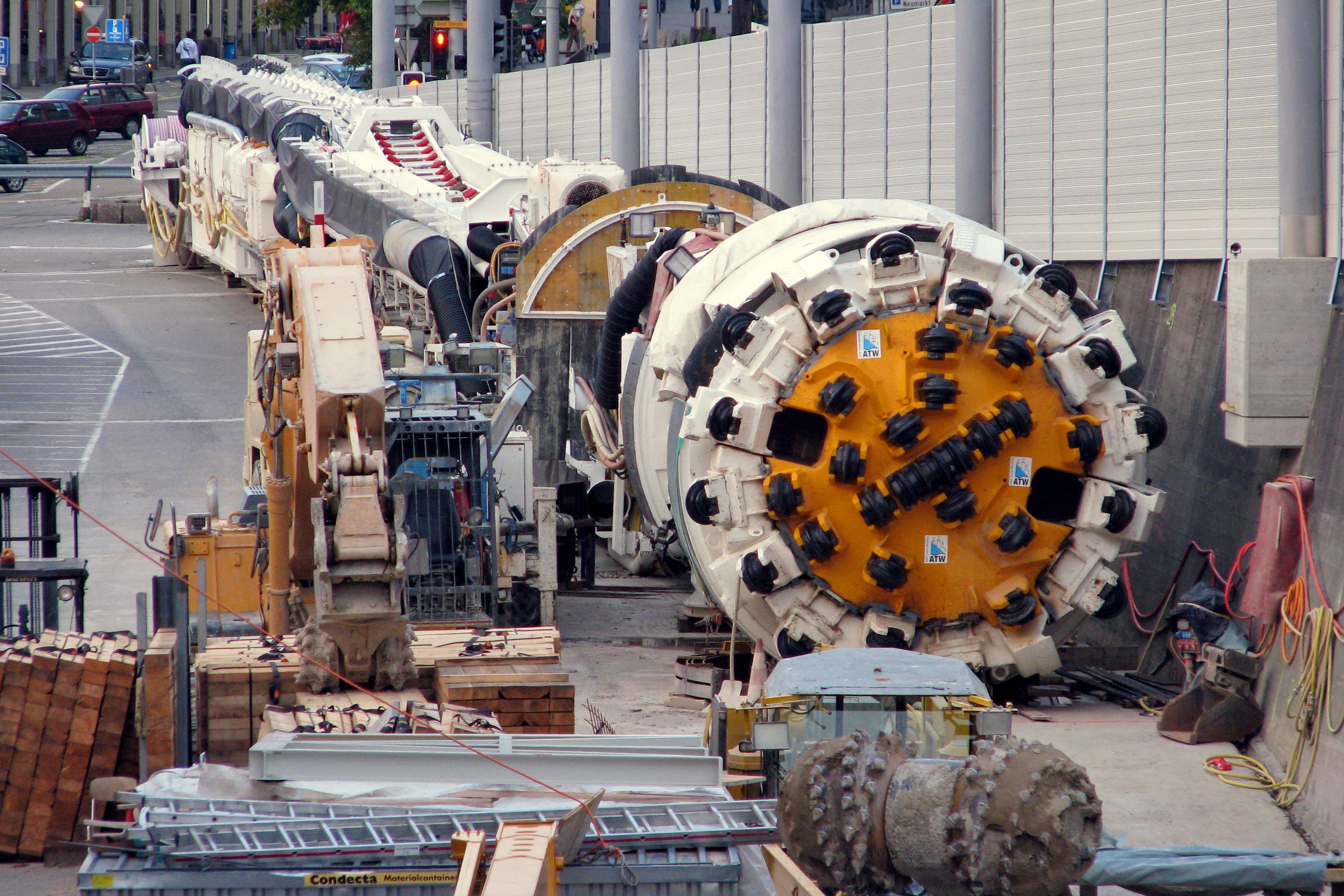
Tunnel boring machine at the site of Weinberg tunnell Altstetten-Zürich-Oerlikon near Zürich Oerlikon railway station

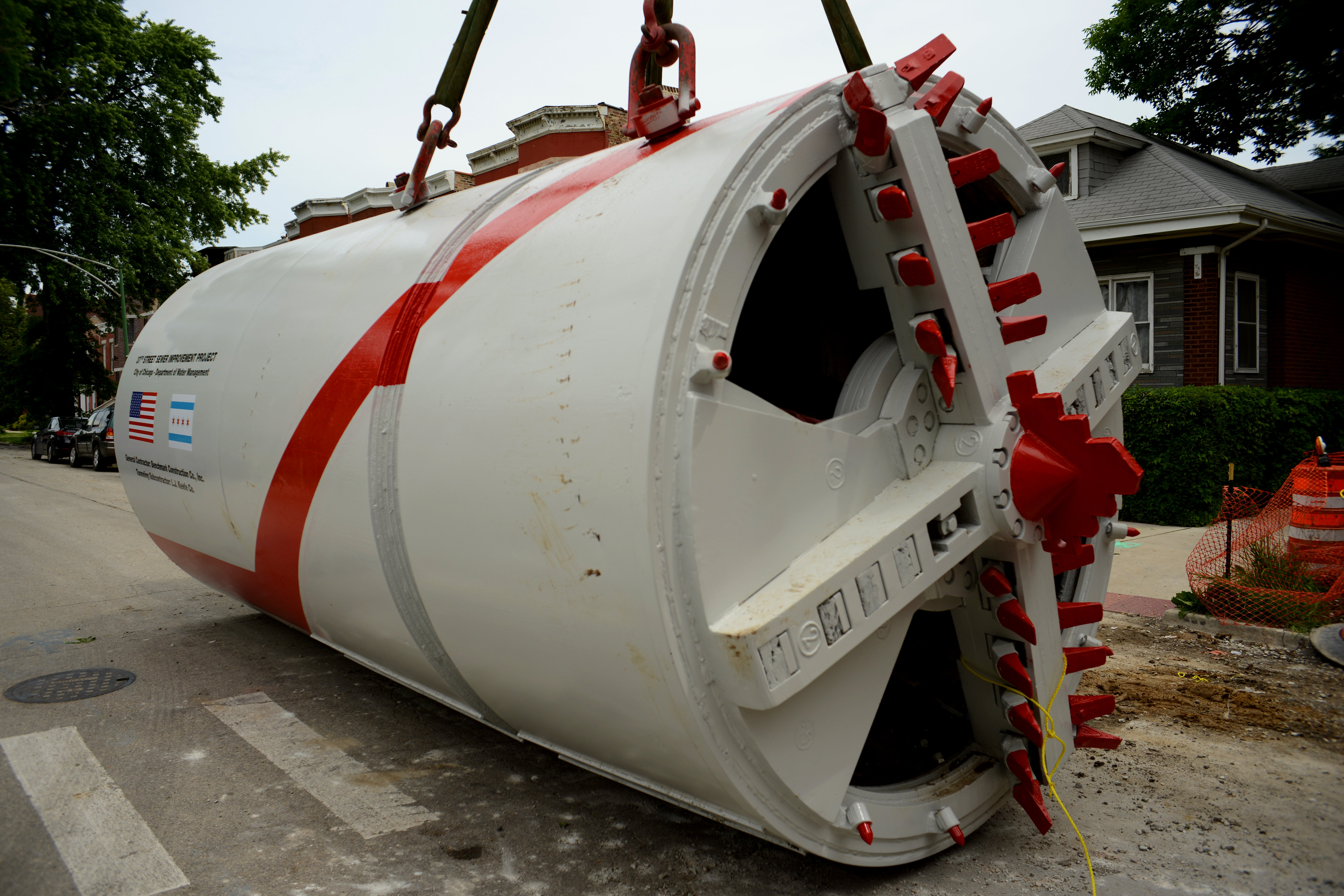
Urban installation for a 2.1-meter (84 in) sewer in Chicago, Illinois, USA

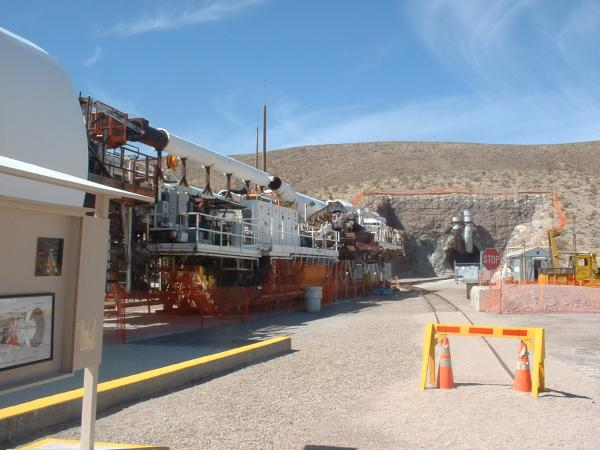
The support structures at the rear of a TBM. This machine was used to excavate the main tunnel of the Yucca Mountain nuclear waste repository in Nevada.

An earth pressure balance (EPB) machine is used in soft soil with less than 7 bar (100 psi) of pressure. It uses muck to maintain pressure at the tunnel face. The muck (or spoil) enters the TBM via a screw conveyor. By adjusting the rate of muck extraction and the advance rate, the pressure at the face can be controlled. Additives such as bentonite, polymers, or foam can be injected ahead of the face to stabilize the ground. Such additives can be injected through the cutter head or extraction screw to ensure that the muck is sufficiently cohesive to maintain pressure and restrict water flow.

The cutter head uses a combination of tungsten carbide cutting bits, carbide disc cutters, drag picks and/or hard rock disc cutters.

EPB has enabled tunneling through soft, wet, or unstable ground with greater speed and safety. The Channel Tunnel, the Thames Water Ring Main, sections of the London Underground, and most new metro tunnels completed in the last 20 years worldwide used an EPB machine.

=== Slurry shield ===
Slurry shield machines can be used in soft ground with significant water pressure and are favored where granular ground conditions (sands and gravels) do not allow a plug to form in the screw. Pressurised slurry typically made of bentonite clay is injected through the cutter head. The slurry applies hydrostatic pressure to the face, mixing with the muck before it is extracted. The mixture is pumped to a slurry separation plant, typically outside the tunnel.

Mixshield machines are aimed at mixed-face conditions (mixed soft soil and rock/boulders). These include hybrid cutter head tooling, enhanced rock crushing, and refined pressure-regulation systems (possibly employing air-cushions) that maintain stable face pressure as ground types vary. The slurry circuit and bulkhead offer greater tolerance of coarse material and sudden changes in ground consistency.

Slurry separation plants use multi-stage filtration systems that separate spoil from slurry to allow slurry reuse. The degree to which slurry can be 'cleaned' depends on the relative particle sizes of the muck. Slurry TBMs are not suitable for silts and clays as the muck particle size is smaller than that of the bentonite. In this case, water is removed from the slurry leaving a clay "cake", which may be polluted.

A caisson system may be placed at the cutter head to allow workers to work on it, for example replacing worn cutter blades. Above-ambient air pressure may occur in the caisson, requiring workers to be medically cleared as "fit to dive" and trained to operate pressure locks. Workers pass through an airlock to reach the cutting head. Some systems allow this to be done robotically.

Slurry TBMs may incorporate jaw crushers, to crush boulders that the TBM encounters. This is necessary so that the pieces can be extracted with the slurry. A screen prevents fragments that are too large from entering the slurry, avoiding clogs in slurry lines.

=== Variable density ===
VDTBMs are a combination of EPB and Slurry types. They can switch between EPB, slurry, high-density slurry, and open modes, supporting tunneling in heterogeneous ground conditions without requiring mechanical modification other than the addition/removal of a slurryfier box. Multi-mode TBMs are a related type that can switch between open and EPB or open and slurry modes and are a precursor to VDTBMs.

=== Tunnel size ===
TBMs range diameter from 1 to 23 meters (3 to 75 ft). Micro tunnel shield TBMs are used to construct small tunnels, and is a smaller equivalent to a general tunnelling shield and generally bore tunnels of 1 to 1.5 meters (3.3 to 4.9 ft), too small for operators to walk in.

== Tunnel lining ==
Some hard rock tunnels do not require a lining and are held up by the remaining rock/dirt.

=== Concrete lining ===
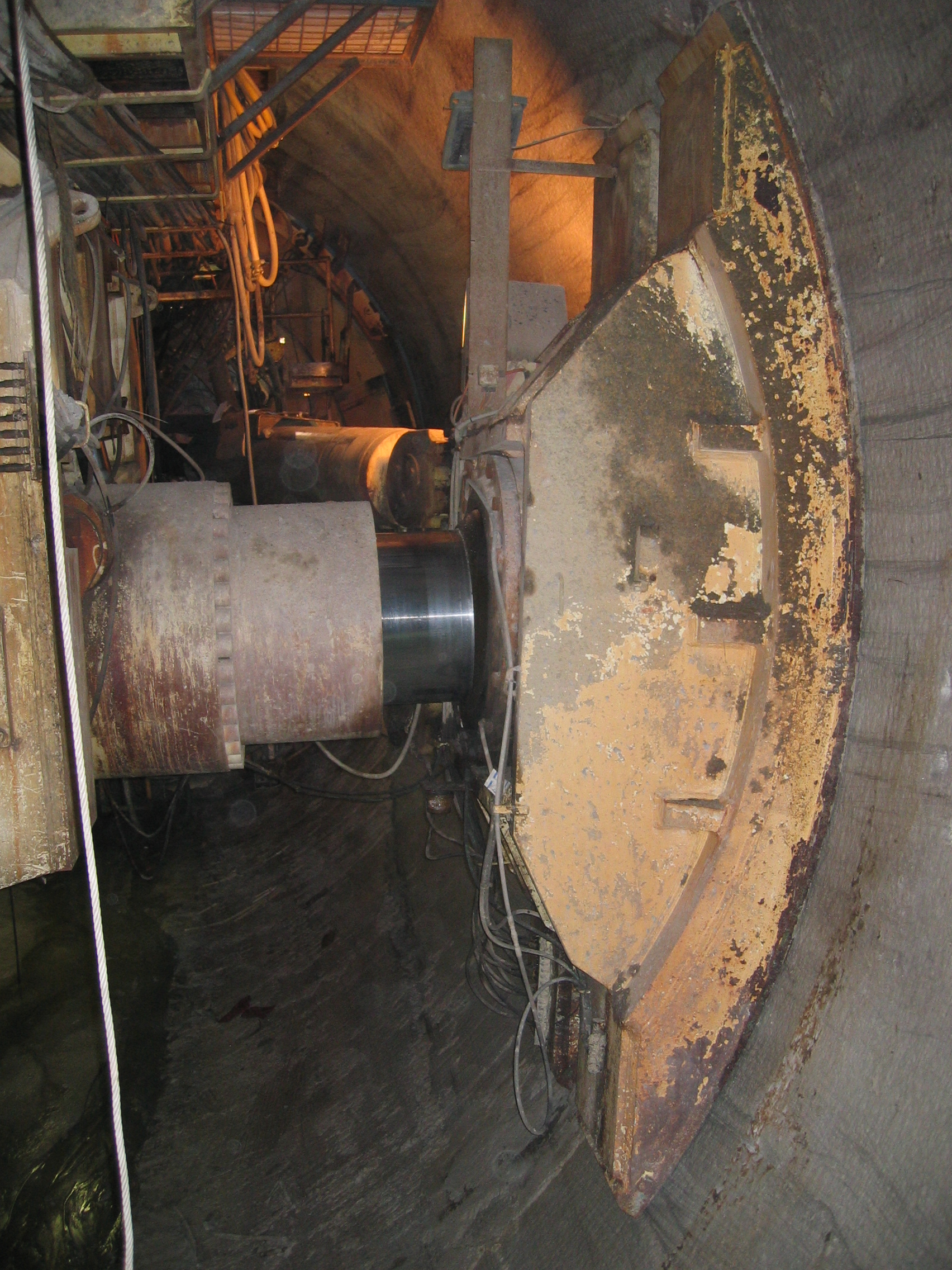
Hydraulic jacks holding a TBM in place

Shielded TBMs are typically used to excavate tunnels in soil. They erect concrete rings behind the TBM to support the tunnel walls. New rings are added as the TBM advances. Each ring is made of several separate segments. The final segment, the key, (often wedge shaped) pushes/locks the other segments together to stabilize the ring. The segments can be bolted to each other to further increase stability. Neoprene rubber seals and/or grouting can reduce water ingress.

=== Pipe lining ===
Pipe jacking TBMs are often used for small diameter tunnels, up to 2 meters in width. To advance the TBM, new sections of pipe are inserted into the tunnel shaft and advanced by a hydraulic jack, which advances the TBM, which is attached to the other end of the pipe. The TBM cannot be steered until it arrives at another shaft. Bentonite can be injected into the space between the pipe and the ground as a lubricant to extend the distance between shafts. Additional jacks can be placed in between pipe segments to extend this distance. Large rectangular tunnels have been excavated using this method.

==== Miscellaneous ====
Main beam machines do not line tunnels. Instead, ground support methods such as ring beams, rock bolts, shotcrete, steel straps, ring steel and wire mesh hold the tunnel open.

== Shields ==
Depending on geology/hydrology, tunnels may need to be temporarily supported to avoid immediate collapse, pending permanent support/lining. Cylindrical shields can follow the TBM to provide such support. TBMS that immediately install permanent linings do not require a shield. Wall stability also influences the method by which the TBM anchors itself in place so that it can apply force to the cutter head. This in turn determines whether the machine can bore and advance simultaneously, or whether these tasks alternate. The machine stabilizes itself in the tunnel with hydraulic cylinders that press against the lining/shield, allowing the TBM to apply pressure at the tunnel face.

=== Single shield ===
A single-shield TBM has a single cylindrical shield after the cutter head. A permanent concrete lining is constructed immediately after the shield, and the TBM pushes off the lining to apply force to the cutter head. Because this pushing cannot be done while a next ring of lining is being constructed, the single-shield TBM operates in alternating cutting and lining modes. Articulation hydraulic cylinders can be used to steer the TBM.

==== Double shield ====
Double shield (or telescopic shield) TBMs have a leading shield that advances with the cutter head and a trailing shield that acts as a gripper. The two shields can move axially relative to each other (i.e., telescopically) over a limited distance. The gripper shield anchors the TBM so that pressure can be applied to the cutter head while simultaneously the concrete lining is being constructed.

== Backup systems ==
Behind all types of tunnel boring machines, in the finished part of the tunnel, are trailing support decks known as the backup system, whose mechanisms can include conveyors or other systems for muck removal; slurry pipelines (if applicable); control rooms; electrical, dust-removal and ventilation systems; worker quarters and refugee chambers, and mechanisms for transport of pre-cast segments.

== Urban tunnelling and near-surface tunnelling ==
Urban tunnelling has the special requirement that the surface remain undisturbed, and that ground subsidence be avoided. The normal method of doing this in soft ground is to maintain soil pressures during and after construction.

TBMs with positive face control, such as earth pressure balance (EPB) and slurry shield (SS), are used in such situations. Both types (EPB and SS) are capable of reducing the risk of surface subsidence and voids if ground conditions are well documented. When tunnelling in urban environments, other tunnels, existing utility lines and deep foundations must be considered, and the project must accommodate measures to mitigate any detrimental effects to other infrastructure.

== See also ==
- Channel Tunnel – Undersea rail tunnel linking France to the UK
- New Austrian tunneling method – Method of modern tunnel design and construction
- Roadheader – Excavation equipment
- Subterrene – Vehicle that moves through solid rock or soil
- Trenchless technology – Underground construction that minimizes surface disruption
