= Hamburg Museum of Work =

Museum in Hamburg, Germany

Coordinates: 53°35′09″N 10°02′44″E

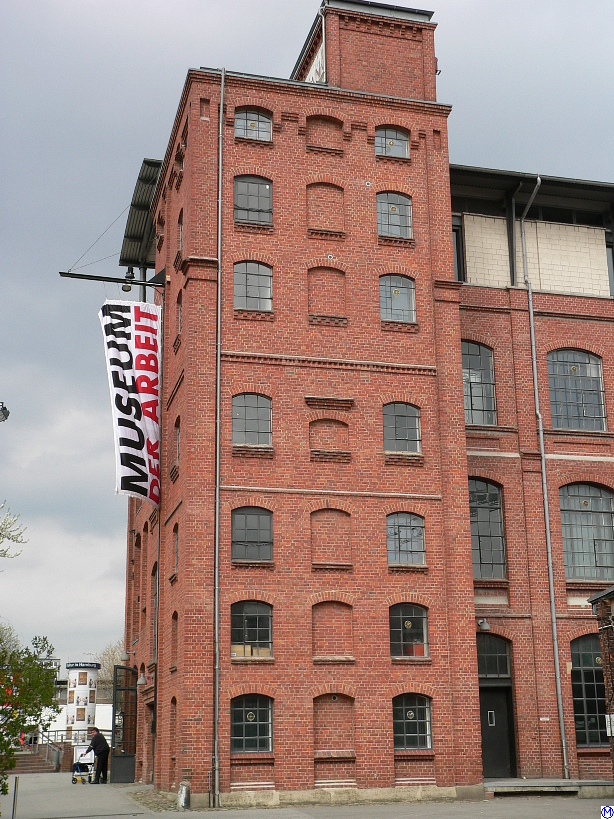
Main site of the Hamburg Museum of work

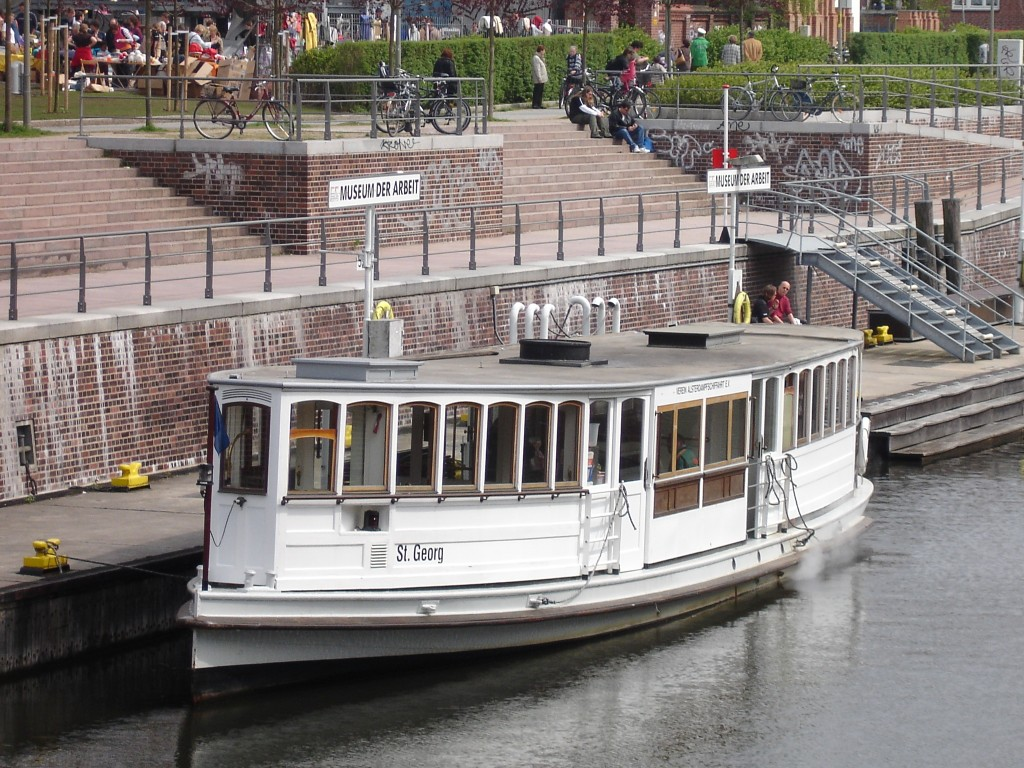
Osterbekkanal site

The Hamburg Museum of Work is a museum in Hamburg-Barmbek. Its major theme is changes in work and living during the last 150 years. It examines and displays the social, cultural, and economic effects of industrialisation. The museum is an anchor point on the European Route of Industrial Heritage (ERIH).

== History ==
The museum was planned in the 1970s, and a site was obtained in 1980. In 1982 it took over the buildings of the former New-York Hamburger Gummi-Waaren Compagnie in Barmbek, these buildings dated from 1871. It put together a provisional display and opened that year. With a permanent workshop it was able to develop the themes and grow the collection. Construction started in 1992, and the first building, the boiler-house was inaugurated in 1994. Further conversions followed and permanent exhibition hall in the 'Haupthaus' opened on 5 January 1997. On 1 January 2008, the management of the museum passed to the Stiftung Historische Museen Hamburg. The first director was Gernot Krankenhagen (1997–2004), followed by Lisa Kosok (2004–2008) and Kirsten Baumann (2009–2013). The current director is Rita Müller.

== Exhibits ==
=== Permanent displays ===
Alltag im Industriezeitalter
The collection of the original owners, the New-York Hamburger Gummi-Waaren with documents showing its history.
Metallwarenfabrik Carl Wild
who worked with enamel.
The Office of a Hanseatic Trading company from the nineteenth century through to the 1950s.

Outside the museum is the cutting head of tunnel boring machine, TRUDE (Tief Runter Unter Die Elbe), used in cutting the tunnels under the Elbe.

=== Temporary exhibitions ===
- From 2010 until 2011 Werbewelten Made in Hamburg – 100 Years of Reemtsma
- In celebration of the 100th anniversary of the Elbe Tunnel, there was an exhibition Tunnel. (Hamburg und seine Unterwelt (Tunnel: Hamburg and its underworld), a deliberate word play on the history, meaning, and significance of tunnel building to the city.
- 2013/2014: Photo exhibition Wanderarbeiter (Migrant Labour).
- 5 November 2015 until 3 April 2016: Zwangsarbeit (Forced labour). The Germans, forced labour and the war.
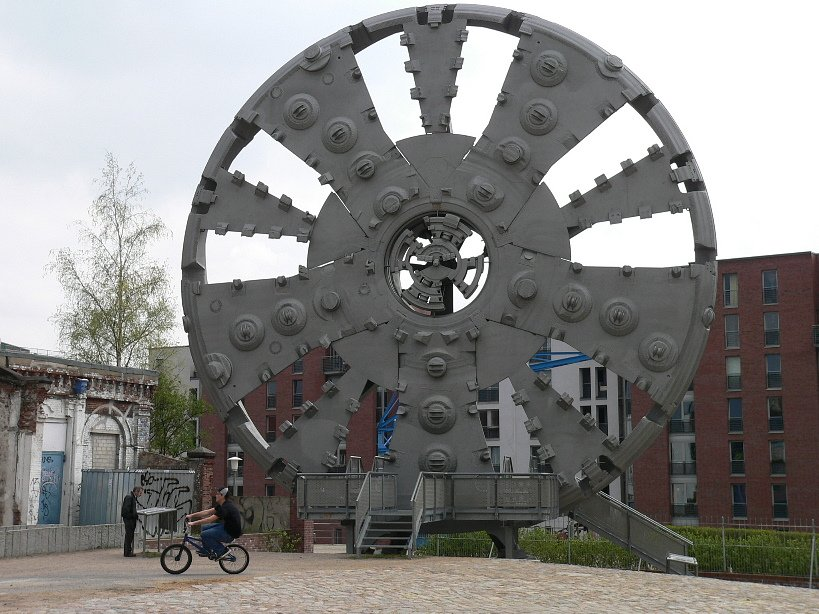
Tunnel boring machine, TRUDE

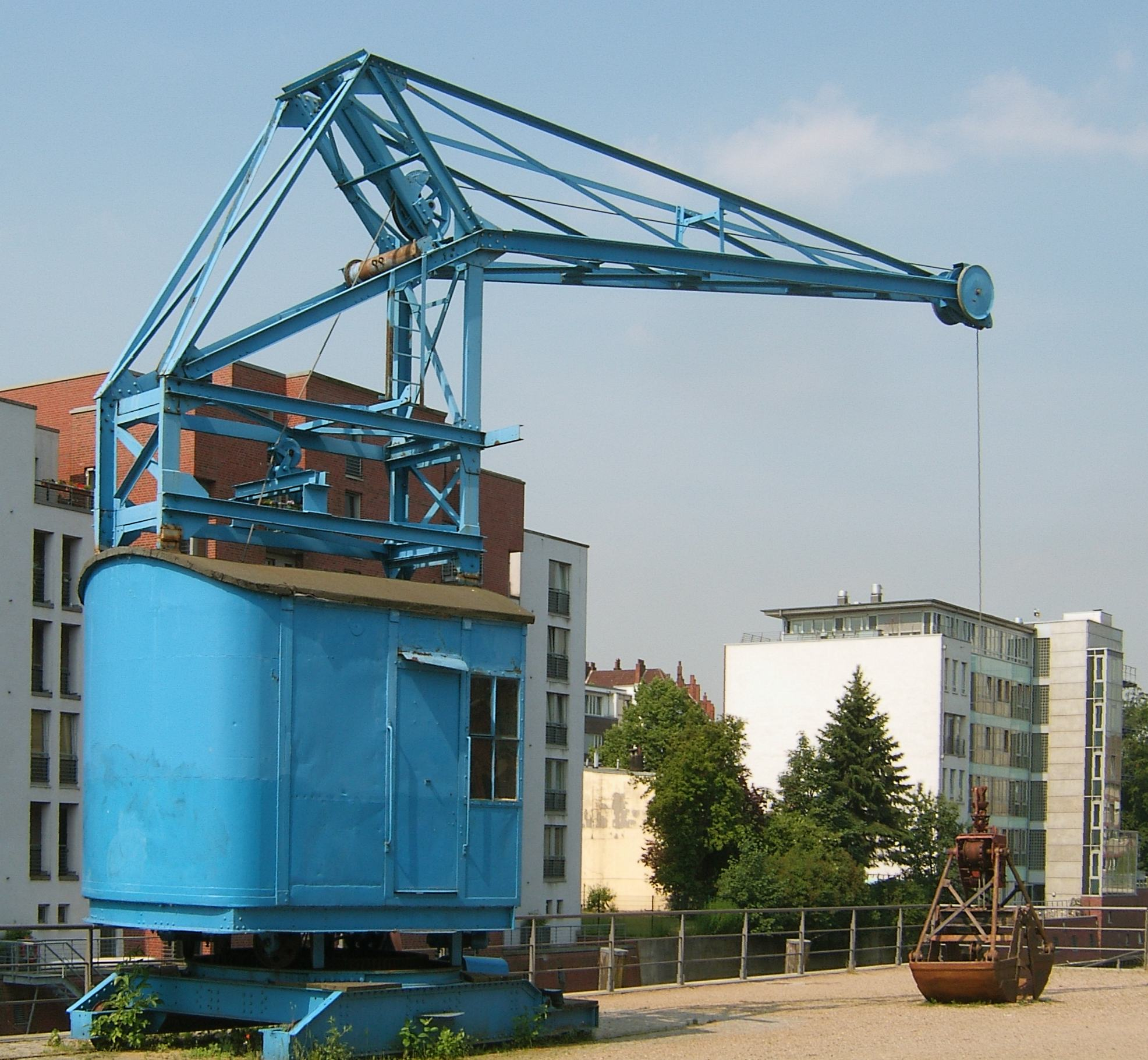
Museum crane

== Subsidiary site- Hafenmuseum ==
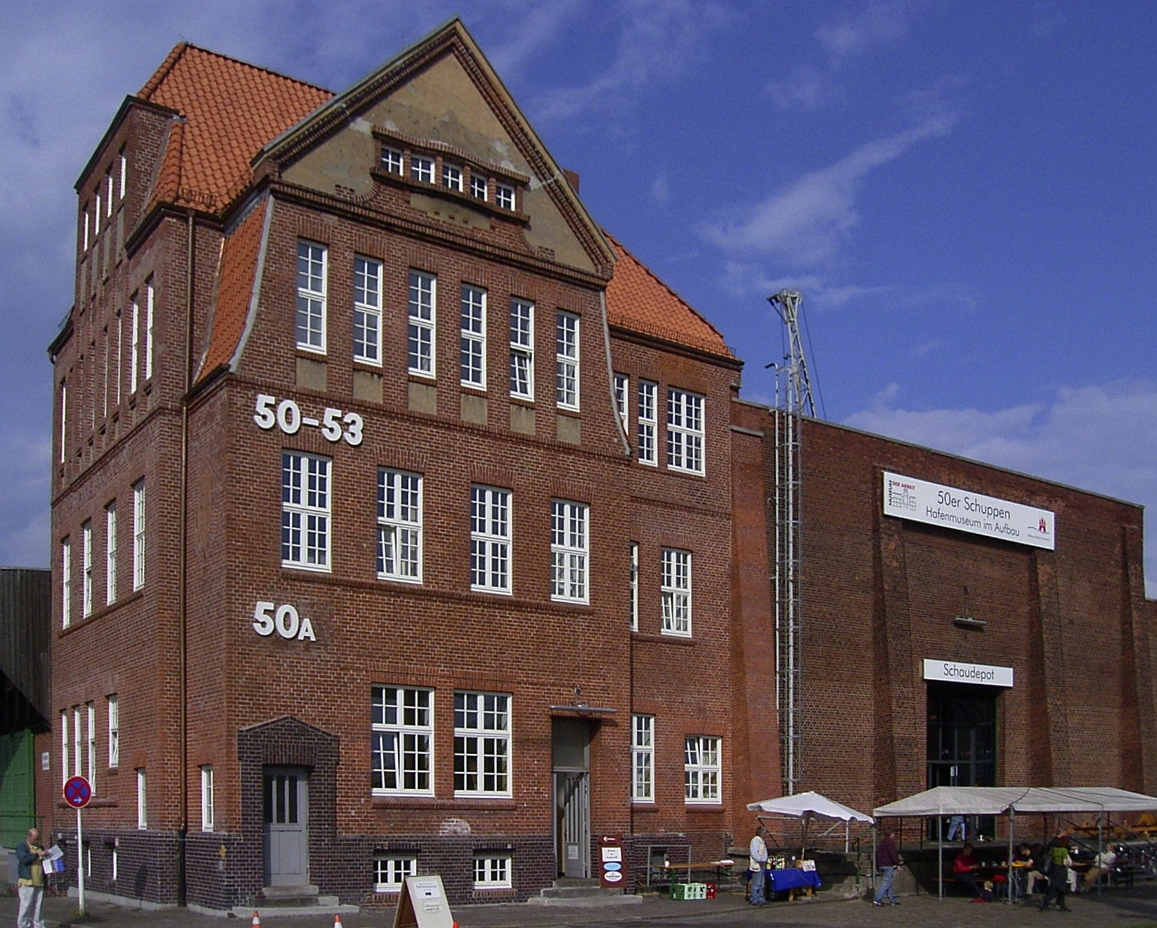
The Museums of Work- subsidiary site on the harbour, Schuppen 50

== See also ==
- Elisabeth von Dücker
