= Elbe Tunnel (1975) =

Elbtunnel
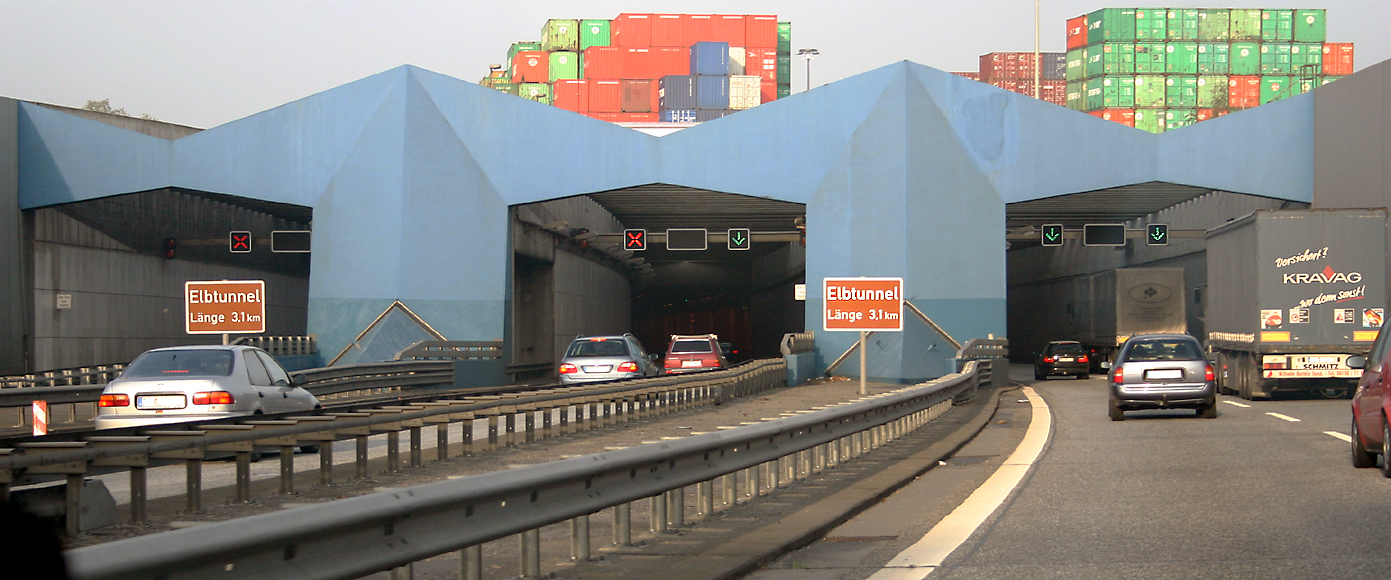
- South entrance of the Elbe Tunnel
- Interactive map of Elbtunnel

Overview
- Official name: Elbtunnel
- Location: Crosses under the Elbe in Hamburg, Germany
- Coordinates: 53°32′12″N 9°55′48″E
- Route: Bundesautobahn 7

Operation
- Work began: 1968
- Opened: 10 January 1975
- Operator: Federal Republic of Germany, Autobahnmeisterei
- Traffic: 110,000

Technical
- Length: 3,325 m (10,909 ft)
- No. of lanes: 8

The New Elbe Tunnel (German: Neuer Elbtunnel), often simply called Elbtunnel, is a subterranean Elbe River crossing in northern Germany located in Hamburg.

== Description ==
The Elbtunnel has a length of 3.1 kilometers (1.9 mi). As a part of the Bundesautobahn 7 in Hamburg, the tunnel forms a connection between Schleswig-Holstein (and on towards Denmark) to the north and Lower Saxony to the south. It has 8 lanes in 4 bores. The newest, fourth bore is the only one to feature a hard shoulder, minimizing congestion due to broken down vehicles. Parts of the tunnel are 27 metres below the water line.

== History ==
The tunnel was constructed from 1968 to 1975 with three bores, containing a total of six autobahn lanes serving the city of Hamburg. On 10 January 1975 the Chancellor of Germany, Helmut Schmidt, opened the Elbe Tunnel. The tunnel was constructed with a capacity for 65,000 cars daily.

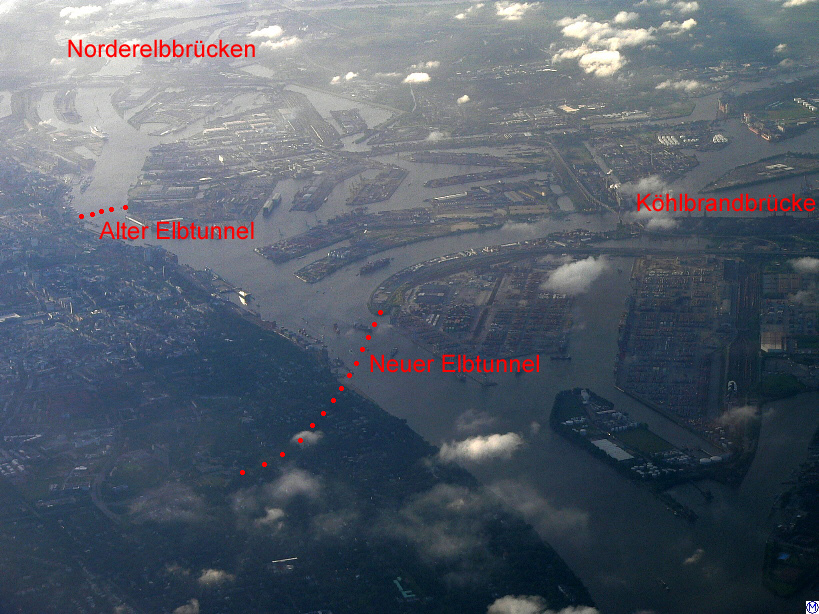
View of the Port of Hamburg (to the south east)

In 1989 concrete tank barriers were constructed on the three south entrances. In war times these barriers would have been exploded out of their resting places. The barriers were removed in 2000 during construction of the 4th bore.

=== Widening ===
To meet the demands of increasing traffic, on 27 October 2002 a fourth bore was opened with two more lanes. The total cost for this expansion amounted 550 million euros.

It had been drilled through the ground by the then world's largest tunnel boring machine (TBM), which had a front plate 14.65 m (48 ft 1 in) in diameter. The machine's name was Trude, a short form of the name Gertrud, and an acronym for Tief runter unter die Elbe (deep down under the Elbe). The European Space Agency had helped in engineering aspects of the tunnel project for the tunnel boring machine.

The centre bores carry reversible lanes which switch direction in anticipation of commuter flows, similar to those of Caldecott Tunnel in Oakland, California. For example, more lanes are available for the morning commute into the city center in the northward direction Flensburg, and more in the southbound direction of Hanover for traffic leaving the city in the evening.

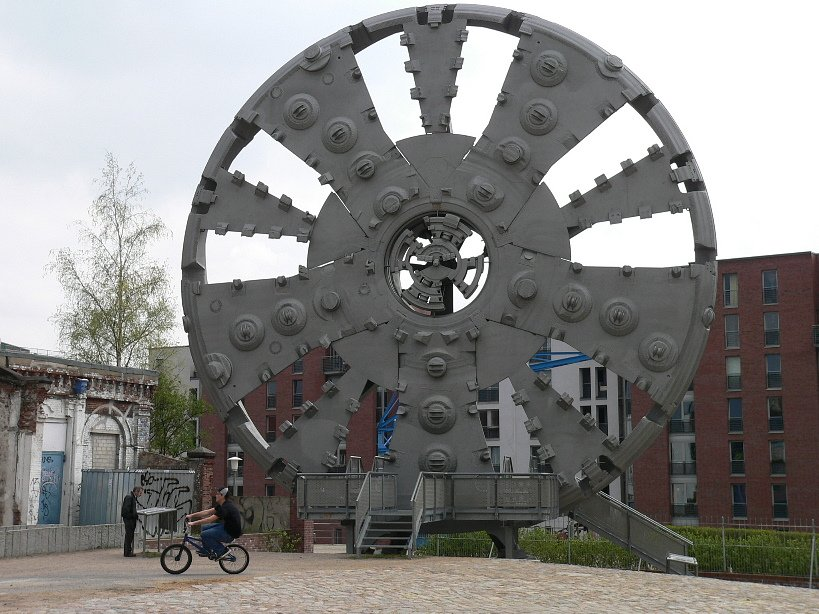
Cutting shield used for the Elbe Tunne, displayed in the Hamburg Museum of Work.

== Vehicle height control ==
The tunnel operation office controls traffic with 7ä45 visual monitors. Traffic lights, highway barriers and variable message signs are in use to regulate 110,000 vehicles per day.

All bores are equipped with an automated height control at each entrance. As soon as a vehicle with a height of more than 4 meters enters the tunnel, the system will stop all traffic in the affected bore. This will ensure that overheight trucks will not damage the tunnel. The police will then direct the truck out of the tunnel so that traffic can resume.

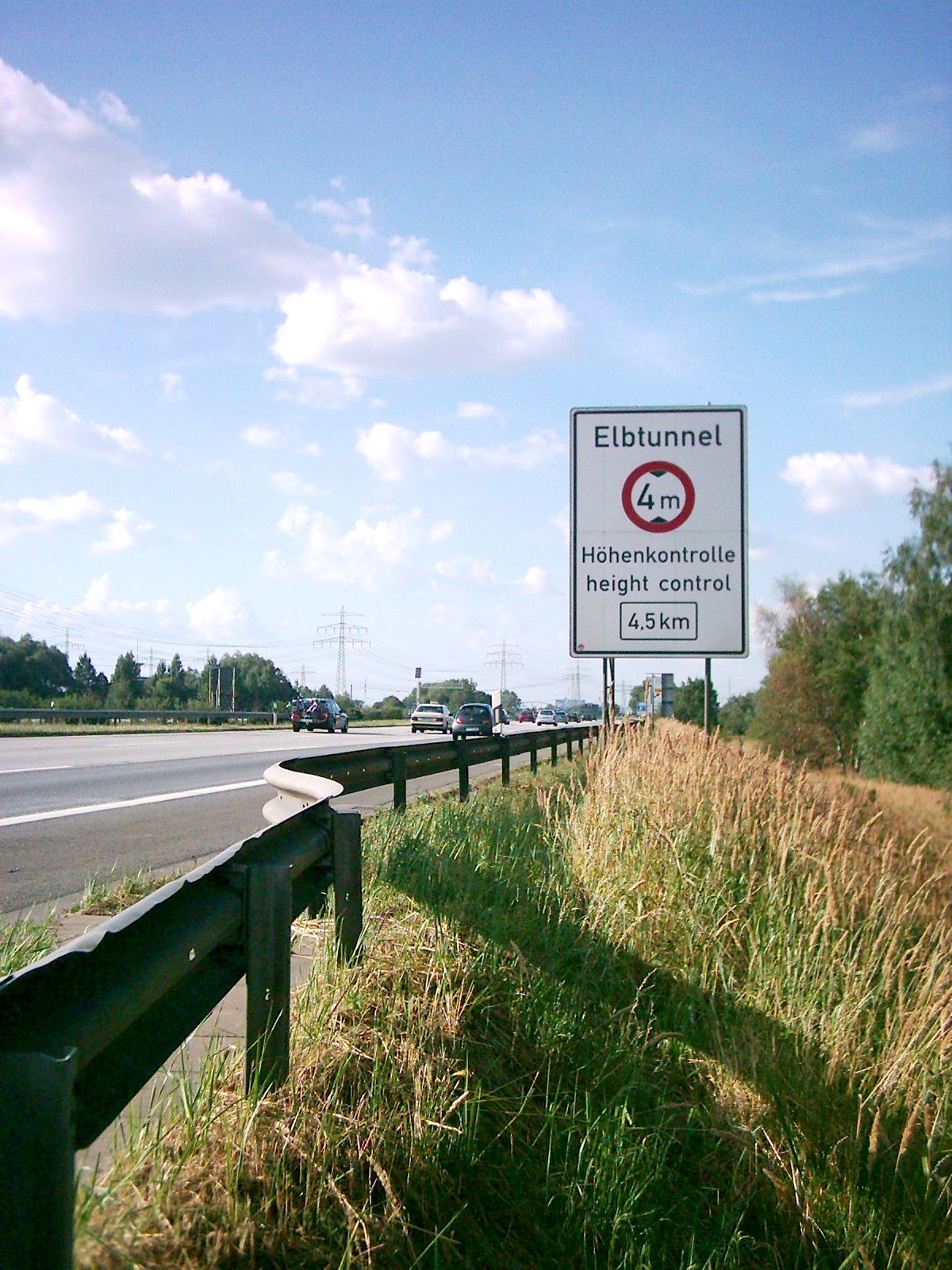
Elbtunnel height control sign

== See also ==
- Old Elbe Tunnel also known as the "St. Pauli Elbtunnel"
- Bundesautobahn 7
