= Elbe Tunnel (1911) =

Pedestrian and vehicle tunnel in Hamburg, Germany

Coordinates: 53°32′45.2″N 9°57′59.6″E

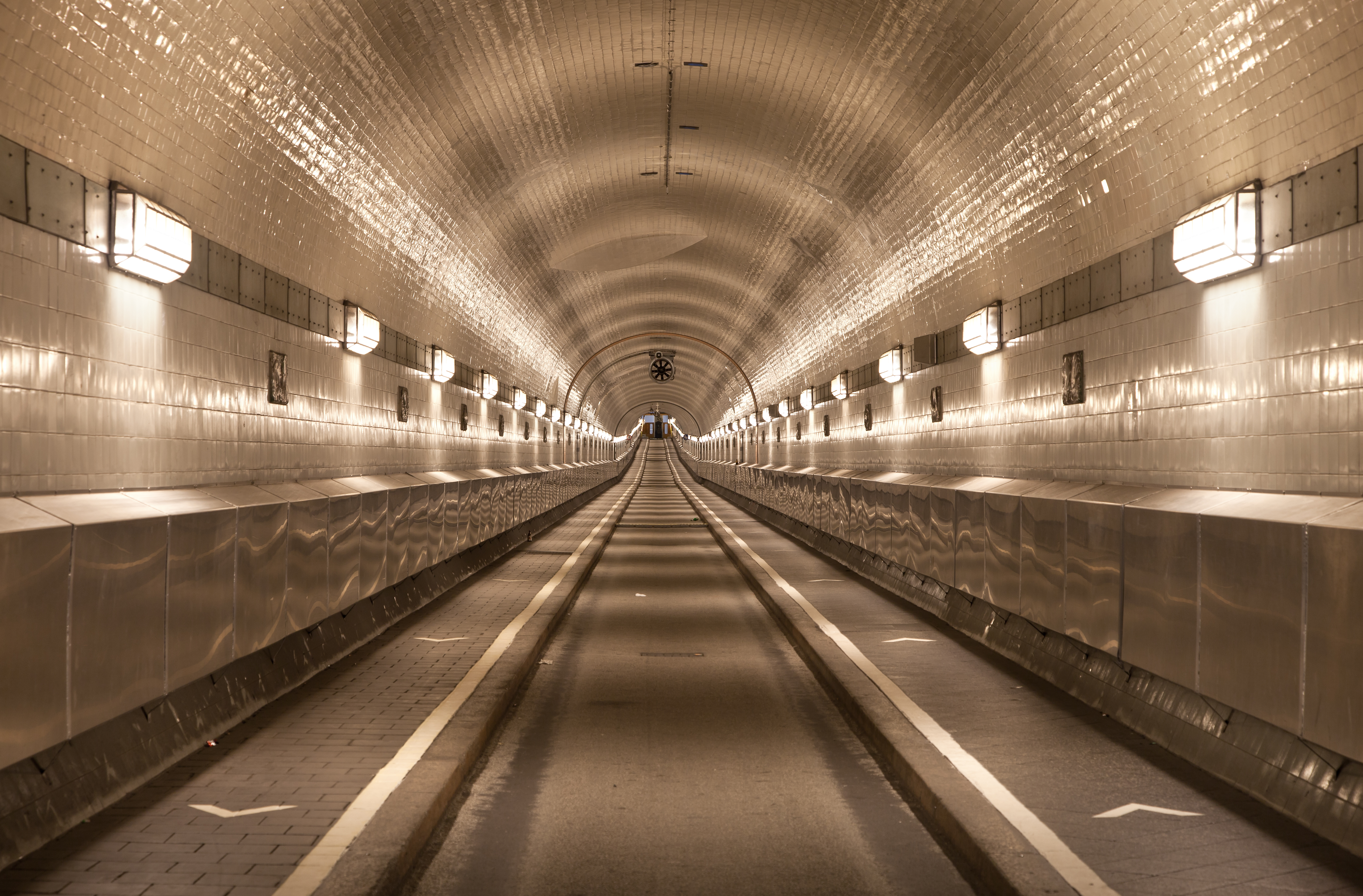
Old Elbe tunnel

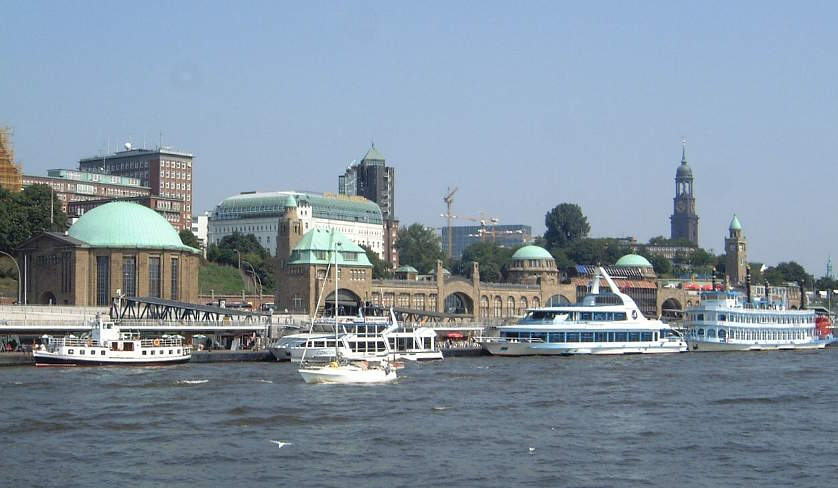
North entrance building of the tunnel (green roof on the left) at the docks

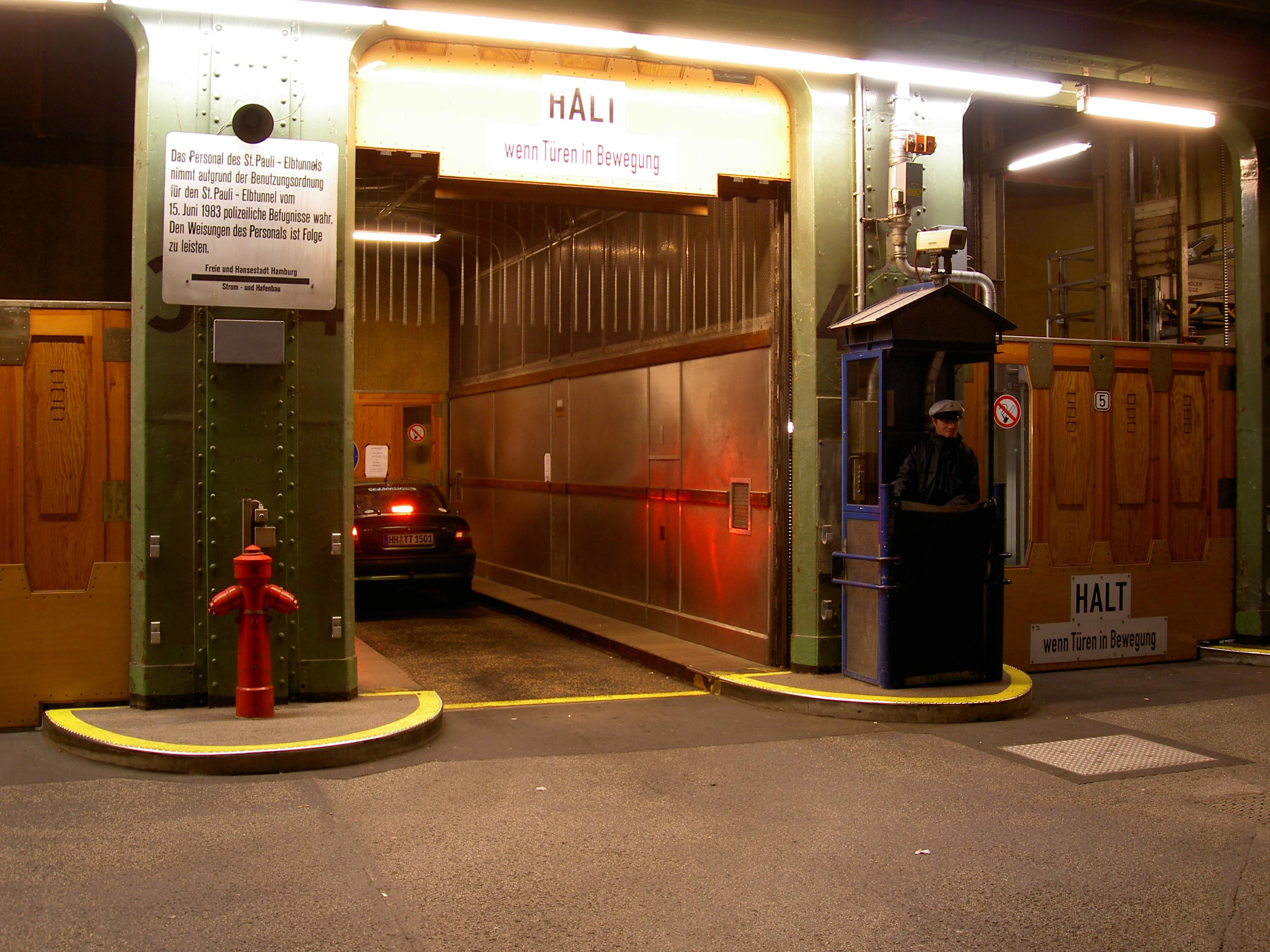
Old Elbe tunnel automobile lift

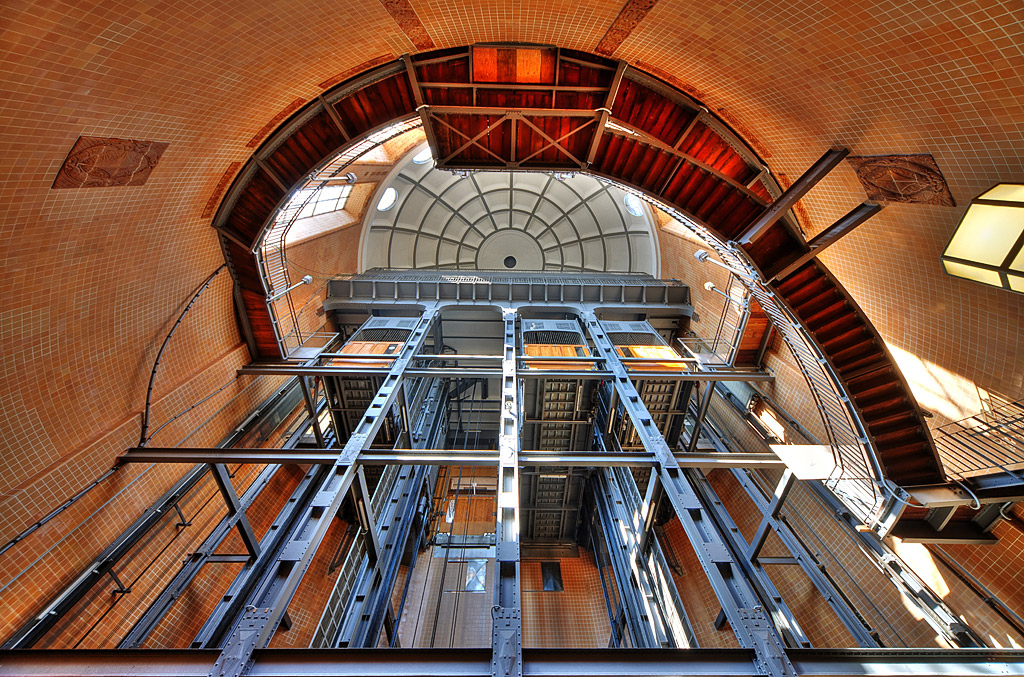
View from the ground of the tunnel to the top, north exit

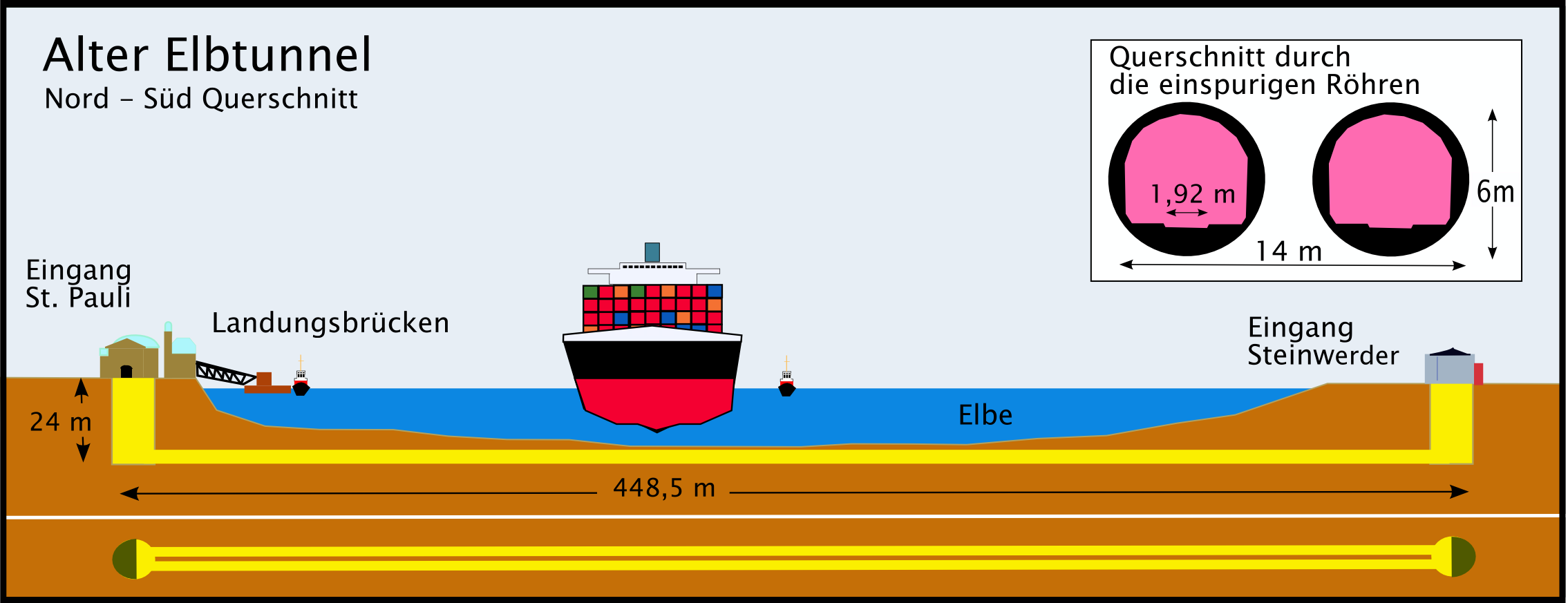
North-South cross section

Old Elbe Tunnel or St. Pauli Elbe Tunnel (German: Alter Elbtunnel colloquially or St. Pauli Elbtunnel officially), which opened in 1911, is a pedestrian and vehicle tunnel in Hamburg. The 426 m (1,398 ft) long tunnel was a technical sensation; 24 m (80 ft) beneath the surface, two 6 m (20 ft) diameter tubes connect central Hamburg with the docks and shipyards on the south side of the river Elbe. This was a big improvement for tens of thousands of workers in one of the busiest harbors in the world.

Six large lifts on either side of the tunnel carry pedestrians and vehicles to the bottom. The two tunnels are both still in operation, though due to their limited capacity by today's standards, other bridges and tunnels have been built and taken over most of the traffic.

In 2008 approximately 300,000 cars, 63,000 bicycles, and 700,000 pedestrians used the tunnel. The tunnel is opened 24 hours for pedestrians and bicycles; however, as of October 2023, the tunnel is closed to all motor vehicles.

== History ==
On 22 July 1907 the construction, undertaken by Philipp Holzmann, started to connect the quarters of St. Pauli near the Landungsbrücken and Steinwerder.

Work was done under pressure because the tunnel is below the water table of the Elbe. This type of building technique was used in the 19th century in large engineering excavations, such as the piers of bridges and tunnels. The caissons with high inside pressure were used to keep water from flooding the excavations, such as the foundations of the Brooklyn Bridge in New York City. At the construction of the St.-Pauli Elbtunnel they used normal vertical caisson for the entrance lift shafts. But for the horizontal tubuses they used special device, that was working horizontally; something like stamping shield under high atmospheric / caisson pressure.

Workers who spent time in high atmospheric pressure conditions had to return to the lower pressure outside through special cabin of slowly pressure reducing. Despite that hundreds of workers had health problems (74 of them had lasting consequences) associated with decompression sickness, and even three of them died. Total number of all workers at the tunnel was ca 4.400.

The tunnel opened on 7 September 1911.

== Modern usage ==
In the tunnel an art exhibition and a long-distance running event Elbtunnel-Marathon take place. In 2008 the tunnel participated in the Tag des offenen Denkmals ("Day of the open heritage site"), a Germany-wide annual event sponsored by the Deutsche Stiftung Denkmalschutz that opens cultural heritage sites to the public.

On the occasion of the reopening of the east tube (on May 22 and 23, 2019), the Hamburg University of Music and Drama and the Hamburg Port Authority organized 4 concerts "Symphony in the St. Pauli Elbtunnel" under the direction of Prof. Georg Hajdu. The pieces composed specifically for this space were orchestrated with strings, winds, accordion, percussion and vocals. For each of the 144 musicians distributed in the two tunnel tubes, the music was displayed in real time on tablets individually controlled by a server computer. The audience walked through the tube and witnessed a unique and changing sound experience.

== Media ==
The old tunnel has featured in several films including The Odessa File, Matchless, $, The American Friend (Der Amerikanische Freund) and Secret Agent Fireball.

The tunnel was also featured in the music video for "One (Always Hardcore)" by German band Scooter.

== Decoration ==
The tunnel walls are decorated with glazed terra cotta ornaments displaying items related to the Elbe river. While most show fish or crabs, a few show different items like litter and rats, too.

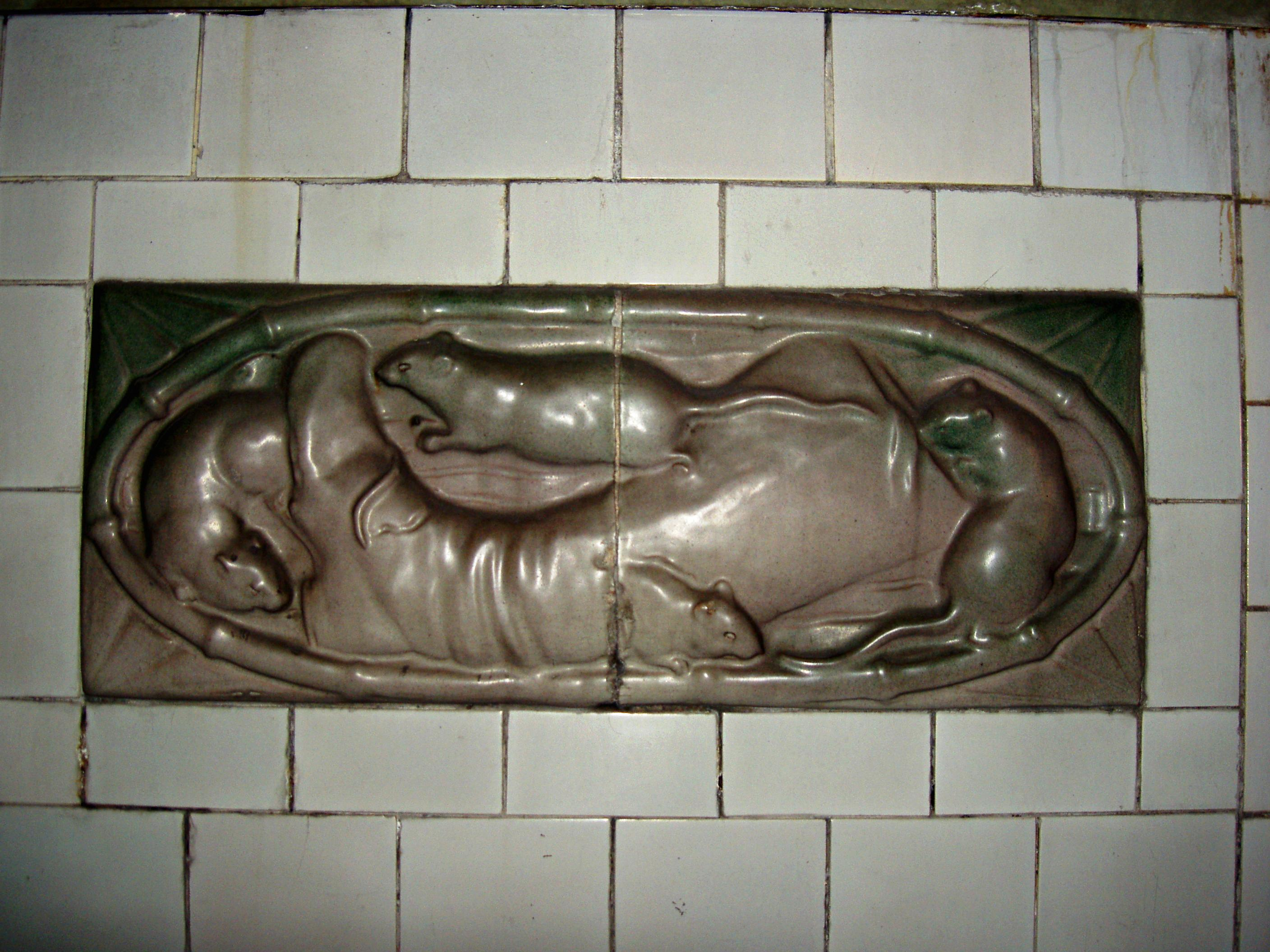
Old boot and rats

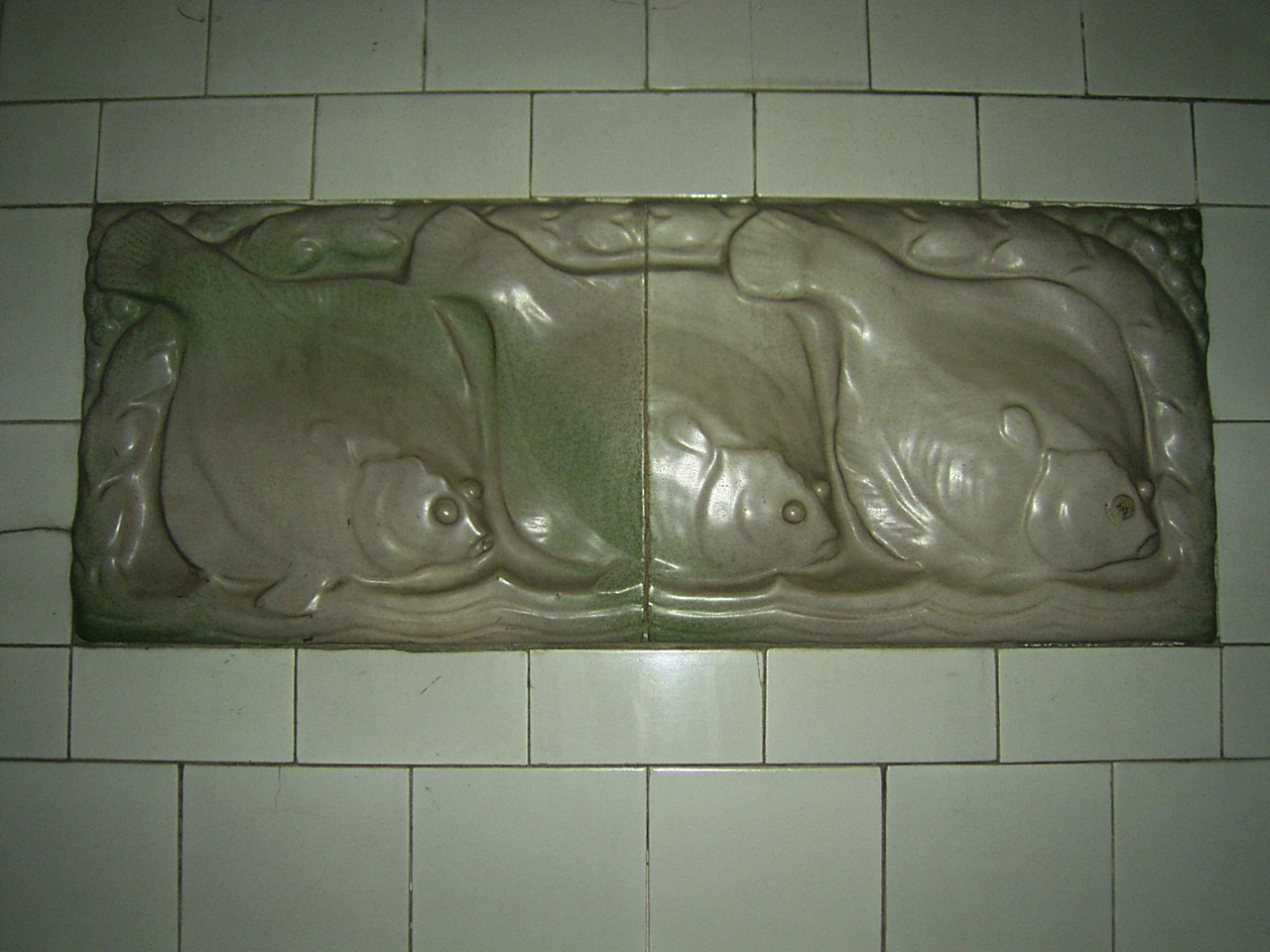
Plaice (Pleuronectes platessa)

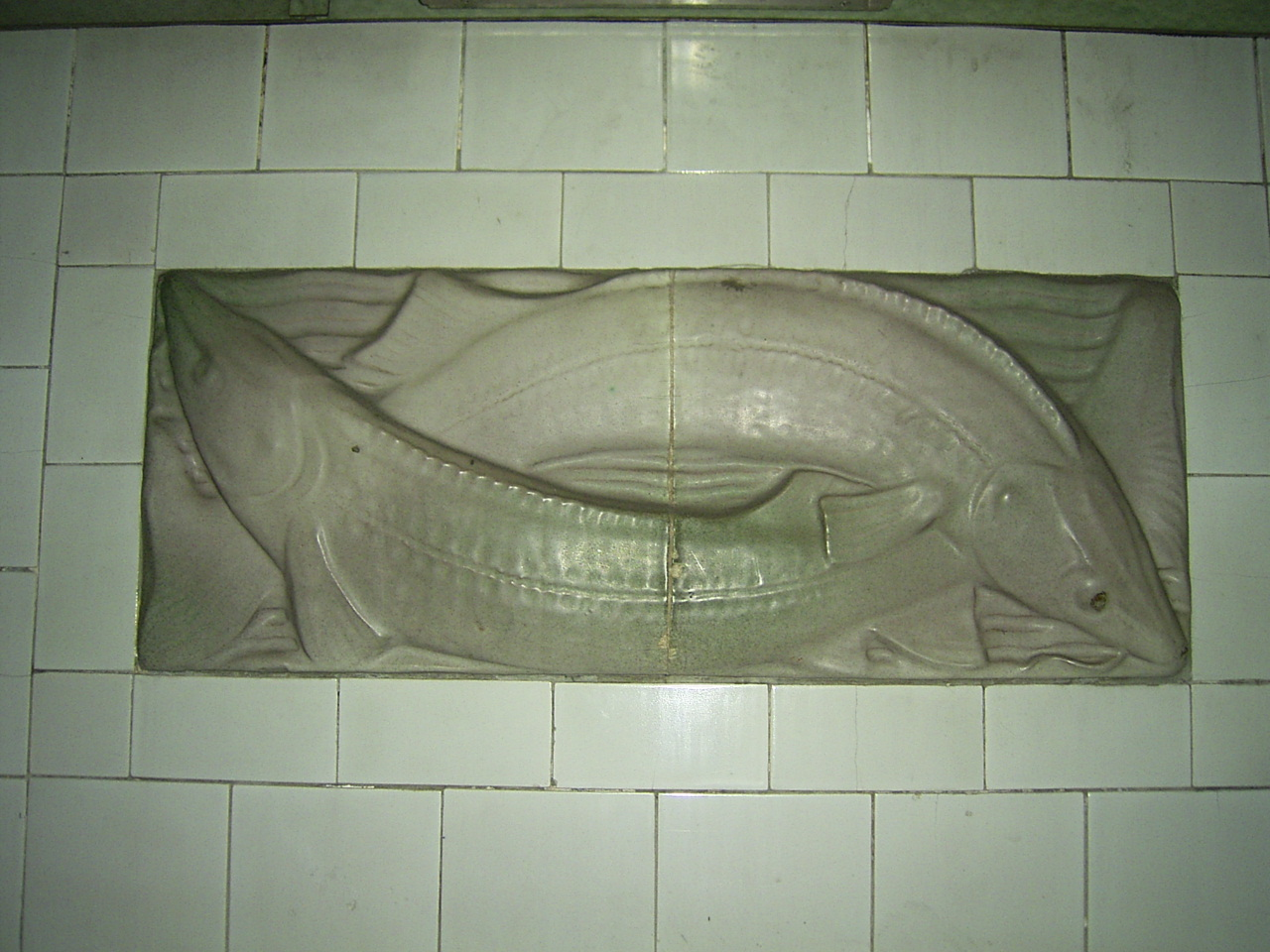
Sturgeon (Acipenser sturio)

== See also ==
- (New) Elbe Tunnel

== Sources ==
- Groß, Lothar (2012). Made in Germany: Deutschlands Wirtschaftsgeschichte von der Industralisierung bis heute Band 1: 1800 - 1945. Books on demand. ISBN 978-3-8482-1042-8.
