= Robinson 2025 =

Season of television series

- Season 26
- Presented by: Anders Lundin; Anna Brolin
- No. of days: 42
- No. of castaways: 27
- Winner: Aron Sjölund
- Runners-up: Sara Mölldal; Pontus Croneld
- Location: Caramoan, Philippines

Release
- Original network: TV4
- Original release: 28 March – 8 June 2025

Season chronology
- ← Previous; Palawan Next → El Nido

Robinson 2025 is the twenty-sixth season of the Swedish reality television series Robinson, it airs on TV4 Play starting on 28 March and on TV4 on 30 March 2025. Presenter is Anders Lundin with Anna Brolin presenting the first week, this season starts with 20 survivors. The tribes are divided into two tribes with the Brains v Brawns theme in play. North Team being the Brains and South Team being the Brawns. Another new feature this season is that three of the nine destiny urns are human skulls; if a contestant chooses an urn containing a skull, that contestant is eliminated and is thus forced to travel back home. The season concluded on 8 June 2025 where Aron Sjölund won in the final challenge against returning players Sara Mölldal and Pontus Croneld to win the grand prize and become the youngest ever winner in the franchise and in Robinson.

== Contestants ==
Notable cast members include influencer Andrea Hedenstedt, one of the hosts of the podcast Mathilda & Andrea, Andreas Leksell, father of singer Victor Leksell and Simon Hallin, former contestant of Hela Sverige bakar.

Contestant	Original Tribe	Swapped Tribe	Post-Intruders Tribe	Switched Tribe	Merged Tribe	Voted Out	The Borderlands	Finish
Madeleine Tärnsby; 45, Axelsberg	South Team					1st Voted Out; Day 6		27th
Anna Bojovic; 56, Solna	North Team					Lost Duel; Day 2	Quit; Day 7	26th
Andreas Egerup; 56, Luleå	North Team					Quit; Day 7		25th
Leith Al-Amide; 31, Åkarp	South Team					Lost Duel; Day 2	Medically evacuated Day 8	24th
Amanda Eliasson; 31, Sällsjö; 2023							Lost Challenge; Day 11	23rd
Pascal Mazza Ramsby; 33, Malmö; Fiji							Medically evacuated Day 11	22nd
Clara Löfström; 22, Vindeln	North Team					Quit; Day 13		21st
Josefine Lindström; 23, Skellefteå	North Team					2nd Voted Out; Day 10	Lost Challenge; Day 15	20th
Amanda Åkesson; 29, Leksand	South Team	North Team				Quit; Day 15		19th
Pontus Croneld; Entered Game							Won Duel; Day 16	
Toni Meher Aziz; 42, Gothenburg	South Team	South Team				4th Voted Out; Day 18		18th
Angelica Pettersson; 41, Sundsvall	North Team					3rd Voted Out; Day 14	Quit; Day 19	17th
Sophie Sörkvist; Entered Game							Won Duel; Day 22	
Fabian Turkalj; 57, Öckerö; 2023							Lost Duel; Day 23	16th
Pål Schakonat; Entered Game							Won Duel; Day 26	
Zuzana Cisternas; 60, Hägersten	North Team	North Team	North Team			5th Voted Out; Day 22	Lost Duel; Day 27	15th
Juliette Bergkvist; Returned to Game	South Team	South Team	South Team	South Team		Lost Duel; Day 26	Won Duel; Day 27	
Simon Swenson; Returned to Game	North Team	North Team				Lost Challenge; Day 22	Won Duel; Day 27	
Andrea Hedenstedt; Returned to Game	South Team	South Team	South Team	South Team		6th Voted Out; Day 26	Won Duel; Day 30	
Sewit Seghid; 32, Salem	South Team	South Team	South Team	South Team		Lost Duel; Day 27	Lost Duel; Day 31	14th
Andreas Leksell; 52, Torslanda	South Team	South Team	South Team	South Team	Robinson	7th Voted Out; Day 30	Quit; Day 32	13th
Simon Hallin; Returned to Game	North Team	North Team	North Team	North Team		Lost Duel; Day 27	Won Duel; Day 32	
Simon Swenson; 36, Stockholm	North Team	North Team			Robinson	Lost Challenge; Day 30	Lost Duel; Day 34	12th
David Grahn; 41, Helsingborg	South Team	South Team	South Team	South Team	Robinson	Lost Challenge; Day 34		11th
Andrea Hedenstedt; 27, Stockholm	South Team	South Team	South Team	South Team	Robinson	8th Voted Out; Day 34		10th
Sara Mölldal; Entered Game							Won Duel; Day 35	
Pål Schakonat; 31, Malmö; 2024				South Team	Robinson	9th Voted Out; 1st Jury Member; Day 38		9th
Christoffer Jarestål; 28, Segeltorp	South Team	South Team	South Team	South Team	Robinson	10th Voted Out; 2nd Jury Member; Day 38		8th
Simon Hallin; 42, Stockholm	North Team	North Team	North Team	North Team	Robinson	Lost Challenge; 3rd Jury Member; Day 39		7th
Sophie Sörkvist; 30, Bromma; 2023				North Team	Robinson	Lost Challenge; 4th Jury Member; Day 40		6th
Kais Ghedamsi; 29, Täby	North Team	North Team	North Team	North Team	Robinson	Lost Challenge; 5th Jury Member; Day 41		5th
Juliette Bergkvist; 28, Sundbyberg	South Team	South Team	South Team	South Team	Robinson	11th Voted Out; Day 41		4th
Pontus Croneld; 29, Bromma; 2024		South Team	South Team	North Team	Robinson	2nd Runner-up; Day 42		3rd
Sara Mölldal; 29, Stockholm; Philippines					Robinson	Runner-up; Day 42		2nd
Aron Sjölund; 18, Uppsala	North Team	South Team	South Team	North Team	Robinson	Robinson; Day 42		1st
