= Robinson 2022 =

Season of television series

- Season 20
- Presented by: Anders Öfvergård
- No. of days: 42
- No. of castaways: 25
- Winner: Filip Johansson
- Runner-up: Jessica Jonasson
- Location: Dominican Republic
- No. of episodes: 51

Release
- Original network: TV4
- Original release: 20 March – 29 May 2022

Additional information
- Filming dates: July – September 2021

Season chronology
- ← Previous; 2021 Next → Malaysia

Robinson 2022 is the twentieth season of the Swedish reality television series Robinson, and was the last to have Anders Öfvergård as presenter. This season the show returned to the Dominican Republic after Robinson 2021 was filmed in Sweden. This season featured the return of Gränslandet where this season, it began with returning players fighting for a chance to gain a spot in the game to have another chance to win Robinson. The season premiered on 20 March 2022 on TV4. The winner was the 32-year-old man Filip Johansson from Mariannelund, who entered as one of the original contestants.

== Contestants ==
List of Robinson 2022 contestants
Contestant	Original Tribe	Switched Tribe	Expanded Tribe	Dissolved Tribe	Merged Tribe	Voted Out	Gränslandet	Finish
Fran Robles; 37, Sollentuna	South Team					Left Competition; Day 6		25th Day 6
Jani Jokinen; 38, Motala; 2020							Lost Duel; Day 6	24th Day 6
Eva Andersson; 55, Kramfors	South Team					1st Voted Out; Day 6		23rd Day 6
Daniel Granlund; 39, Luleå	North Team	North Team				Left Competition; Day 8		22nd Day 8
Isabella "Bella" Resmark; 26, Ängelholm	South Team	South Team				Medically Evacuated; Day 9		21st Day 10
Christina Nordback; 33, Stockholm	South Team	South Team				Medically Evacuated; Day 9		20th Day 10
Per Grape; 43, Sollentuna	South Team	South Team				Medically Evacuated; Day 10		19th Day 10
Sandra Cucarano; 24, Stockholm	North Team	South Team				Medically Evacuated; Day 11		18th Day 10
Jabril "Jib" Smith; 25, Stockholm	South Team	South Team				Left Competition; Day 11		17th Day 11
Anna Frycklund; Entered Game							Returnee; Day 11	
Hayes Jemide; Entered Game							Returnee; Day 11	
Linn Lund; Entered Game							Returnee; Day 11	
Mattias Pettersson; Entered Game							Returnee; Day 11	
Angela Maria Perira Praxedes; Returned to Game	North Team	North Team				2nd Voted Out; Day 10	Won Duel; Day 14	
Gorm Hallberg Lange; 61, Stockholm	North Team	North Team				Lost Challenge; Day 10	Lost Duel; Day 21	16th Day 21
Anna Frycklund; 55, Västerås; 2021			East Team			4th Voted Out; Day 18	Medically Evacuated; Day 25	15th Day 25
Mattias Pettersson; 52, Motala; 2020			East Team	East Team		8th Voted Out; Day 26	Quit due to Injury; Day 29	14th Day 29
Elin Brynzér; Returned to Game			West Team	East Team		5th Voted Out; Day 22	Won Duel; Day 29	
Tommie Gyllin; 38, Hallsberg			West Team	East Team	Robinson	Ejected; Day 32		13th Day 32
Angela Maria Perira Praxedes; 46, Öjebyn	Northerg Team	North Team	East Team	East Team	Robinson	9th Voted Out; Day 30	Lost Duel; Day 32	12th Day 32
Shevin Urgun; 28, Stockholm	North Team	North Team	North Team	North Team		7th Voted Out; Day 26	Lost Duel; Day 33	11th Day 33
Hayes Jemide; Returned to Game			East Team			3rd Voted Out; Day 14	Won Duel; Day 33	
Elin Brynzér; 25, Gothenburg			West Team	East Team	Robinson	10th Voted Out; Day 34		10th Day 34
Hayes Jemide; 48, Stockholm; 2021			East Team		Robinson	Quit due to Injury; Day 36		9th Day 36
Joel Häggblom; 25, Djursholm	North Team	North Team	North Team	East Team	Robinson	11th Voted Out; Day 38		8th Day 38
Peter Szabo; 31, Stockholm	North Team	North Team	North Team	North Team	Robinson	Lost Challenge; Day 40		7th Day 40
Linn Lund; 31, Nälden; 2019			East Team	East Team	Robinson	Lost Challenge; Day 41		6th Day 41
Hanna Bergwall; 26, Stockholm	South Team	South Team	South Team	North Team	Robinson	12th Voted Out; Lost Duel; Day 41		5th Day 41
Desirée Renfors; 28, Stockholm			West Team	North Team	Robinson	13th Voted Out; Day 41		4th Day 41
Henrik Appelberg; 45, Habo			West Team	East Team	Robinson	Lost Challenge; Day 42		3rd Day 42
Jessica Jonasson; 40, Gothenburg	North Team	North Team	North Team	North Team	Robinson	Runner-up; Day 42		2nd Day 42
Filip Johansson; 32, Mariannelund	South Team	South Team	South Team	North Team	Robinson	Robinson; Day 42		1st Day 42

== Challenges ==
Cycles	Air dates	Challenges		Eliminated	Vote	Finish
Cycles	Air dates	Reward	Immunity	Eliminated	Vote	Finish
Cycle 1	20 March 2022			Fran	0	Left Competition; Day 6
Cycle 1	20 March 2022			Jani	0	Lost Challenge; Day 6
Cycle 1	20 March 2022					1st Voted Out; Day TBD
