= Robinson 2021 =

Season of television series

- Season 19
- Presented by: Anders Öfvergård
- No. of days: 42
- No. of castaways: 20
- Winner: Dennis Johansson
- Runners-up: Annki Nilsson; Joanna Swica
- Location: Seskar-Furö and Halsön-Kallskär, Sweden
- No. of episodes: 51

Release
- Original network: TV4
- Original release: 21 March – 30 May 2021

Additional information
- Filming dates: 23 July 2020 – September 2020

Season chronology
- ← Previous; 2020 Next → 2022

Robinson 2021, also known as Robinson Sverige (English: Robinson Sweden), is the nineteenth season of Robinson. For the first time in the show's history, due to the COVID-19 pandemic, the season was filmed within Sweden at Seskar-Furö in Haparanda and Halsön-Kallskär in Kalix. The season is broadcast on TV4 and Anders Öfvergård is again the presenter.

== Contestants ==
The 12 initial contestants, divided into team South and team North, were revealed on 9 March 2021. Alexander and Elias started as 'moles' in team South and team North, respectively, meaning they belonged to the opposite team until after the first Robinson challenge and earned immunity in the first week's vote if they didn't get revealed as moles. Both passed and completed the mole task.

From Day 19, contestants that are eliminated are sent to The Borderlands to fight their way back to the merge. On Day 20, four new contestants (Anna, Rickard, William and Wilma) appeared and competed in a challenge to decide which two would join the competition and which two would be sent to Gränslandet (English: The Borderlands). Rickard and William won and were ordered to choose their team members for their new tribes in alternating order, as captains of their tribes, with William choosing first as he finished first. They were also immune at the first week's tribal council. When there was only one person left to choose, that person (Tova-Sophia) was sent to The Borderlands as well.

Alexander and Tova-Sophia were disqualified after eating food purchased outside the show.

Contestant	Joined	Original Tribe	Intruder's Tribe	Merged Tribe	Eliminated	The Borderlands	Finish
Michael "Rud" Dean; 58, Helsingborg	Day 1	South Team			1st Voted Out; 1st Jury Member; Day 6		20th
Hayes Jemide; 46, Stockholm	Day 1	South Team			2nd Voted Out; 2nd Jury Member; Day 11		19th
Lovisa Almén; 29, Gothenburg	Day 4	North Team			Medically Evacuated; Day 12		18th
Viktoria Widelius; 38, Fjällbacka	Day 1	South Team			3rd Voted Out; 3rd Jury Member; Day 15		17th
Paul Michael Wrenkler; 31, Trångsund	Day 4	North Team			Left Competition; Day 20		16th
Anna Frycklund; 54, Västerås	Day 20				Lost Challenge; Day 20	Lost Duel; 4th Jury Member; Day 23	15th
Elias Akyol; 26, Gothenburg	Day 1	South Team	North Team		5th Voted Out; Day 23	Lost Duel; Day 27	14th
Alexander Chennaoui; 48, Grödinge	Day 1	North Team			4th Voted Out; Day 19	Ejected; Day 29	12th
Tova-Sophia Aronsson; 35, Onsala	Day 1	North Team			Not Picked; Day 20	Ejected; Day 29	12th
Ludvig Andersson; Returned to Game	Day 1	North Team	North Team	Robinson	6th Voted Out; Day 26	Won Duel; Day 30	
Wilma Wernersson; 22, Kalmar	Day 20				Lost Challenge; Day 20	Lost Duel; 5th Jury Member; Day 34	11th
Johanna Thorén; 20, Lidingö/Florence, Italy	Day 1	North Team	South Team	Robinson	7th Voted Out; Day 30	Lost Duel; 6th Jury Member; Day 37	10th
Ludvig Andersson; Returned to Game	Day 1	North Team	North Team	Robinson	9th Voted Out; Day 34	Won Duel; Day 38	
Andreas Alseryd; Returned to Game	Day 1	North Team	South Team	Robinson	8th Voted Out; Day 30	Runner-up; Day 38	
Rickard Länta; 52, Jokkmokk	Day 20		South Team	Robinson	10th Voted Out; 7th Jury Member; Day 38		9th
William Seth Wenzel; 23, Stockholm	Day 20		North Team	Robinson	11th Voted Out; 8th Jury Member; Day 38		8th
Annica Lundgren Frisk; 54, Stenkullen	Day 1	South Team	North Team	Robinson	Lost Challenge; 9th Jury Member; Day 39		7th
Olivia Baldwin; 25, Stockholm	Day 1	South Team	North Team	Robinson	Lost Challenge; 10th Jury Member; Day 40		6th
Ludvig Andersson; 21, Skanör	Day 1	North Team	North Team	Robinson	12th Voted Out; 11th Jury Member; Day 41		5th
Andreas Alseryd; 45, Obbola	Day 1	North Team	South Team	Robinson	13th Voted Out; Day 41		4th
Annki Nilsson; 55, Nässjö	Day 1	North Team	North Team	Robinson	Runner-up; Day 42		2nd
Joanna Swica; 32, Stockholm	Day 4	South Team	South Team	Robinson	Runner-up; Day 42		2nd
Dennis Johansson; 32, Skellefteå	Day 4	South Team	South Team	Robinson	Robinson; Day 42		1st

== Challenges ==
Note: Cycle 4 was the last cycle during the Original Tribe period, and Cycle 5 the only cycle during the Intruder's Tribe period.

Episodes	Air dates	Challenges		Eliminated	Vote	Finish
Episodes	Air dates	Reward	Immunity	Eliminated	Vote	Finish
Cycle 1 (1-6)	21-25 March 2021, 28 March 2021	North Team	North Team	Dean	7-1	1st Voted Out; Day 6
Cycle 2 (7-11)	29 March-1 April 2021, 4 April 2021	South Team	North Team	Hayes	4-2-1	2nd Voted Out; Day 11
Cycle 3 (12-16)	5–8 April 2021, 11 April 2021	North Team	North Team	Lovisa	No Vote	Evacuated; Day 12
Cycle 3 (12-16)	5–8 April 2021, 11 April 2021	North Team	North Team	Viktoria	5-1-1	3rd Voted Out; Day 15
Cycle 4 (17-21)	12–15 April 2021, 18 April 2021	North Team	South Team	Alexander	5-1-1	4th Voted Out; Day 19
Cycle 5 (22-26)	19–22 April 2021, 25 April 2021	South Team	South Team	Elias	5-2-1	5th Voted Out; Day 23
Cycle 6 (27-31)	26–29 April 2021, 2 May 2021	Johanna	William	Ludvig	10-5	6th Voted Out; Day 26

== Voting History ==
Note: The "Blood Revenge" (previously named "Black Hand") is a vote given by a voted-out person to one of the remaining contestants in their team which applies to that person in its next vote.

	Original Tribe			
Episode	6	11	16	21
Eliminated	Dean	Hayes	Viktoria	Alexander
Vote	7-1	4-2-1	5-1-1	5-1-1
Alexander				Wrenkler
Andreas				Alexander
Annica	Dean	Viktoria	Viktoria	
Annki				Alexander
Dennis	Dean	Hayes	Viktoria	
Elias	Dean	Hayes	Viktoria	
Joanna	Dean	Hayes	Viktoria	
Johanna				Alexander
Ludvig			Dennis	Alexander
Olivia	Dean	Hayes	Viktoria	
Tova-Sophia				Alexander
Wrenkler				Annki
Viktoria	Dean	Dennis	Elias	
Lovisa				
Hayes	Dean	Viktoria		
Dean	Olivia			
Blood Revenge		~~Elias~~	~~Joanna~~	

	Intruder's Tribe
Episode	26
Eliminated	Elias
Vote	5-2-1
Andreas	
Annica	Elias
Annki	Elias
Dennis	
Elias	Annki
Joanna	
Johanna	
Ludvig	Elias
Olivia	Annki
Rickard	
William	Elias
Blood Revenge	Olivia
Opponents	Elias

	Merged Tribe
Episode	31
Eliminated	Ludvig
Vote	10-5
Andreas	Olivia (x2)
Annica	Ludvig (x2)
Annki	Olivia
Dennis	Ludvig (x2)
Joanna	Ludvig
Johanna	Olivia
Ludvig	Olivia
Olivia	Ludvig
Rickard	Ludvig
William	Ludvig (x2)
Blood Revenge	Ludvig

== Votes Received ==
	Original Tribe			
Episode	6	11	16	21
Eliminated	Dean	Hayes	Viktoria	Alexander
Blood Revenge	Elias	Joanna	Olivia	Tova-Sophia
Votes	8	7 (8)	7 (8)	7
Alexander	-	-	-	5
Andreas	-	-	-	0
Annica	0	0	0	-
Annki	-	-	-	1
Dennis	-^{1}	1	1	-
Elias	-^{2}	-^{3}	1	-
Joanna	0	0	-^{4}	-
Johanna	-	-	-	-^{7}
Ludvig	-	-	-	0
Olivia	1	0	-^{5}	-
Tova-Sophia	-	-	-	-^{6}
Wrenkler	-	-	-	1
Viktoria	0	2	5	
Lovisa	-	-		
Hayes	0	4		
Dean	7			

	Intruder's Tribe
Episode	26
Elimimated	Elias
Blood Revenge	Ludvig
Votes	8
Andreas	-
Annica	-^{9}
Annki	2
Dennis	-
Elias	5
Joanna	-
Johanna	-
Ludvig	0
Olivia	1
Rickard	-
William	-^{8}

	Merged Tribe
Episode	31
Eliminated	
Blood Revenge	
Votes	
Andreas	AndOreas
Annica	
Annki	
Dennis	
Joanna	
Johanna	-^{10}
Ludvig	
Olivia	
Rickard	
William	

^1 Dennis was immune as he won the individual immunity challenge.
^2 Elias was immune as he passed the mole task that week.
^3 Elias was immune as he won the individual immunity challenge.
^4 Joanna was immune as she was chosen by Wrenkler (who won team North's mission) to be immune.
^5 Olivia was immune as she won the immunity challenge.
^6 Tova-Sophia was immune as she won the immunity challenge.
^7 Johanna was immune as she was given the extra immunity that Tova-Sophia won at the immunity challenge.
^8 William was immune as it was his first week as team captain (as a result of winning the Day 20 intruders' admission challenge).
^9 Since William already had an immunity, after winning the immunity challenge he had the option of giving his extra immunity to someone else, which he did to Annica.
^10 Johanna was immune as she won the award challenge and thus earned immunity as part of being the commander of The abode of power (Swedish: Maktens boning) that week.
