= Robinson: Palawan =

Season of television series

- Season 25
- Presented by: Petra Malm
- No. of days: 42
- No. of castaways: 23
- Winner: Ida Jensen Krogstad
- Runners-up: Nabaz Baki; Amanda Blomå
- Location: El Nido, Philippines

Release
- Original network: TV4
- Original release: 14 October – 19 December 2024

Season chronology
- ← Previous; 2024 Next → 2025

Robinson: Palawan is the twenty-fifth season of the Swedish reality television series Robinson. The season takes place in El Nido, Philippines where Petra Malm presents 21 contestants to the show, having them experience the harsh nature amongst nature and each other whilst trying to win reward and immunity to avoid elimination. The main twist this season is for the first time, the contestants are divided into 3 groups of 7. However, only 2 groups will form the teams. The losing team will all be sent to The Borderlands to fight for their way back into the game. The grand prize remains at 500,000 kr. The season premiered on 14 October 2024 on TV4. The season concluded on 19 December 2024 where Ida Jensen Krogstad won in the final challenge against Nabaz Baki and Amanda Blomå to win the grand prize and claim the title of Robinson.

== Contestants ==
Contestant	Team					Main game	The Borderlands	
Contestant	Original	First Switch	Post-Intruders	Second Switch	Merge	Main game	Finish	Day
Maxim Spasskiy; Returned to Game	Group 1					Lost Challenge; Day 2	Won Duel; Day 4	
Natalie Tellin; Returned to Game	Group 1					Lost Challenge; Day 2	Won Duel; Day 4	
Roger Flink; 52, Lomma	Group 1	North Team				Quit; Day 6		23rd Day 6
Gertrud Lund; Returned to Game	Group 1					Lost Challenge; Day 2	Won Challenge; Day 7	
Viktor Widlund; Returned to Game	Group 1					Lost Challenge; Day 2	Won Challenge; Day 10	
Amanda Rivas; 28, Stockholm	Group 1					Lost Challenge; Day 2	Lost Challenge; Day 11	22nd Day 11
Chris Minchez; 35, Malmö	Group 3	South Team	South Team			Lost Challenge; Day 10	Lost Challenge; Day 15	21st Day 15
Thomas Bergkvist; 58, Kallinge	Group 2	North Team	North Team			3rd Voted Out; Day 14	Lost Challenge; Day 19	20th Day 19
Lena Alke; 37, Häggsjövik	Group 3	South Team				1st Voted Out; Day 6	Lost Challenge; Day 23	19th Day 23
Ludvig Westberg; 24, Uppsala	Group 3	South Team	South Team	North Team	Robinson	Eliminated; Day 24		18th Day 24
Ramia Salgo; 41, Jönköping	Group 2	North Team	North Team	South Team		5th Voted Out; Day 22	Lost Challenge; Day 26	17th Day 26
Patrik Bernstorf; Entered Game							Won Challenge; Day 26	
Elsa Gyll; 20, Leksand	Group 2	North Team	North Team	North Team	Robinson	6th Voted Out; Day 26		16th Day 26
Monireh Vandi; 48, Stockholm	Group 2	North Team	North Team	North Team	Robinson	Lost Challenge; Day 26	Lost Challenge; Day 30	15th Day 30
Amanda Blomå; Returned to Game	Group 3	South Team	South Team	South Team		4th Voted Out; Day 18	Won Challenge; Day 30	
Emmeli Lis Åström; 33, Järfälla	Group 2	North Team	North Team	North Team	Robinson	7th Voted Out; Day 30		14th Day 30
Tommy Björkman; 53, Borlänge	Group 3	South Team	South Team	North Team	Robinson	Quit due to Injury; Day 33		13th Day 33
Alva Torell Björkman; 27, Malmö	Group 1					Lost Challenge; Day 2	Lost Challenge; Day 34	12th Day 34
Natalie Tellin; Returned to Game	Group 1	South Team	South Team			2nd Voted Out; Day 10	Won Challenge; Day 34	
Oliver Wong; Returned to Game	Group 2	North Team	North Team	South Team	Robinson	Lost Challenge; Day 30	Won Challenge; Day 34	
Gertrud Lund; 50, Lit	Group 1		North Team	North Team	Robinson	Lost Challenge; Day 34		11th Day 34
Ali Kassem; 44, Eslöv	Group 3	South Team	South Team	North Team	Robinson	8th Voted Out; Day 34		10th Day 34
Tove Dalsryd; 30, Asolo, Italy; Philippines			North Team	South Team	Robinson	Lost Challenge; 1st Jury Member; Day 38		9th Day 38
Viktor Widlund; 22, Järfälla	Group 1		South Team	South Team	Robinson	Eliminated; 2nd Jury Member; Day 38		8th Day 38
Oliver Wong; 33, Stockholm	Group 2	North Team	North Team	South Team	Robinson	Lost Challenge; 3rd Jury Member; Day 39		7th Day 39
Natalie Tellin; 34, Kungsbacka	Group 1	South Team	South Team		Robinson	Lost Challenge; 4th Jury Member; Day 40		6th Day 40
Patrik Bernstorf; 53, Tyresö; Philippines					Robinson	Lost Challenge; 5th Jury Member; Day 41		5th Day 41
Maxim Spasskiy; 31, Gällivare	Group 1	North Team	North Team	South Team	Robinson	9th Voted Out; Day 41		4th Day 41
Amanda Blomå; 30, Gold Coast, Australia	Group 3	South Team	South Team	South Team	Robinson	2nd Runner-up; Day 42		3rd Day 42
Nabaz Baki; 40, Ekenäs, Finland	Group 2	North Team	North Team	North Team	Robinson	Runner-up; Day 42		2nd Day 42
Ida Jensen Krogstad; 35, Stockholm	Group 3	South Team	South Team	South Team	Robinson	Robinson; Day 42		1st Day 42

== Voting history ==
Robinson: Palawan voting history
	First switched tribes		Post-intruders tribes		Switched tribes		Merged tribe						
Episode	5		10	15	20	25	30	35		40	45	49	50
Day	6		10	14	18	22	26	30		34	38	41	
Team	South		South	North	South	South	Robinson	Robinson		Robinson	Robinson	Robinson	
Voted Out	Lena		Natalie	Thomas	Amanda B.	Ramia	Elsa	Emmeli (Note: After Emmeli was voted out, she smashed an Urn of Faith containing a duel. She challenged Gertrud for her spot in the game but lost the duel.)		Ali	Nabaz (Note: After Nabaz was voted out, he smashed an Urn of Faith containing a duel. He challenged Viktor and won the duel, eliminating Viktor instead.)	Tie	Maxim
Votes	7–3		5–2–1	7–3	3–2	5–2–0 (Note: A Hidden Immunity Token was played, negating all votes against its user.) (Note: A Hidden Immunity Token was played; however, no votes were cast against its user.)	10–1–1–1–1–1	8–5		6–2	2–1–1–0	2–2	2–3 (Note: The jury members voted to save a castaway during the final 4.)
Voter	Vote												
Ida	Natalie		Natalie		N/A (Note: This castaway was ineligible to vote at this Tribal Council.)	Ramia	Elsa	N/A (Note: Nabaz used his vote steal advantage on Ida; therefore, Ida was ineligible to vote, whereas Nabaz cast two votes.)		Ali	Nabaz	Maxim	N/A
Amanda B.	Natalie		Natalie		Ramia	Maxim (Note: This castaway cast a black vote.)		Emmeli		Tove	~~Ida~~	Nabaz	N/A
Nabaz				Elsa			Elsa	Emmeli	Emmeli	Ali	~~Ida~~	Maxim	N/A
Maxim				Thomas	N/A	~~Ida~~	Emmeli	Emmeli		Ali	~~Ida~~	Nabaz	N/A
Patrik							Elsa	Emmeli		Ali	~~Ida~~		Maxim
Natalie	Lena		Tommy				Tommy				~~Ida~~		Maxim
Oliver				Elsa	Amanda B.	Ramia	Elsa				Patrik		Ida
Viktor			Ali		Ramia	Ramia	Elsa	Maxim		Ali	Nabaz		Ida
Tove				Thomas	Amanda B.	Ramia	Elsa	Maxim		Ali			Ida
Ali	Lena	Lena	Natalie			Maxim (Note: This castaway was a member of the North Team but cast a vote against one of the South Team members.)	Elsa	Emmeli		Tove	Maxim		
Gertrud				Thomas			Elsa	Emmeli					
Tommy	Lena		Natalie				Elsa	Emmeli					
Emmeli				Thomas			Elsa	Maxim					
Elsa				Thomas			Gertrud						
Monireh				Thomas		Ramia							
Ludvig	Lena		Natalie										
Ramia				Thomas	Amanda B.	~~Ida~~	Ida						
Thomas				Elsa			Nabaz						
Chris	Lena	Lena											
Lena	Natalie		Ali										
Roger													
Amanda R.													
Alva													
Penalty								Maxim	Maxim				
