= Robinson: Panama =

- Season 29
- Presented by: Martin Järborg
- Location: Islands of Panama

Release
- Original network: TV4
- Original release: Invalid date range

Season chronology
- ← Previous; Robinson 2026

Robinson: Panama is the 29:th season of Swedish Expedition Robinson. The season premiered on TV4 on 14 September, 2026. Presenter is Martin Järborg. This season is filmed in Panama.

The tribe leaders for North and South this season is Juliette Bergkvist and Christoffer Jarestål, who both participated in Robinson 2025 and are a couple since.
