= Robinson 2026 =

Season of television series

- Season 28
- Presented by: Anders Lundin; Martin Järborg
- No. of days: 43
- No. of castaways: 22
- Winner: Sonja Fredriksdotter Rudqvist
- Runners-up: Iki Gonzalez Magnusson; Caroline Järgren
- Location: Caramoan, Philippines

Release
- Original network: TV4
- Original release: 30 March – 7 June 2026

Season chronology
- ← Previous; El Nido Next → Robinson: Panama

Robinson 2026 is the twenty-eighth season of the Swedish reality television series Robinson. The season returns to Caramoan, Philippines where Anders Lundin presents 20 Swedes competing in four tribes of five with the contestants being divided based on the regions of Sweden they reside in (north, south, east and west). During the filming, Lundin fell ill; while he recovered, Martin Järborg, the host of the previous season, came in to fill the role. The season premieres on TV4 on 30 March 2026. The season concluded on 7 June 2026 where Sonja Fredriksdotter Rudqvist won in the final challenge against Iki Gonzalez Magnusson and Caroline Järgren after 43 days to win the grand prize of 500,000kr and the title of Robinson.

== Contestants ==
Notable cast members include, the daughter of former education minister Johan Pehrson, Anna Pehrson, Sebastian De La Vega, the boyfriend of singer and Idol judge Peg Parnevik and Nathalie Eliasson, the sister of professional footballer Niclas Eliasson.

Contestant	Original Tribe	Absorbed Tribe	Switched Tribe	Merged Tribe	Voted Out	The Borderlands	Finish
Aydin Haressi; 40, Åre	North Team				Ejected; Day 5		22nd
Waldo Shelton Torres; 23, Stockholm	East Team				Lost Challenge; Day 3	Quit; Day 5	21st
Melina Bozioti; Returned to Game	East Team				Lost Challenge; Day 3	Won Challenge; Day 7	
Erika Eriksson; 44, Fagersta	North Team				1st Voted Out; Day 6	Medically evacuated Day 8	20th
Nathalie Eliasson; Returned to Game	East Team				Lost Challenge; Day 3	Won Challenge; Day 10	
Anja Fält Sjöberg; 50, Stockholm	East Team				Lost Challenge; Day 3	Lost Challenge; Day 11	19th
Lema Yurt; 25, Växjö	South Team	South Team			Quit; Day 13		18th
Sebastian De La Vega; 39, Stockholm	East Team				Lost Challenge; Day 3	Lost Challenge; Day 15	17th
Hanna Wallmark; Returned to Game	West Team				Lost Challenge; Day 7	Won Challenge; Day 16	
Carl-Oscar Bodalen; 25, Milan, Italy	South Team	South Team			2nd Voted Out; Day 10	Lost Challenge; Day 19	16th
Melina Bozioti; 56, Stockholm	East Team	South Team	South Team		Quit; Day 21		15th
Aza Altonchi; Returned to Game	South Team	South Team			Lost Challenge; Day 10	Won Challenge; Day 23	
Hanna Wallmark; 24, Gothenburg	West Team	South Team	South Team		5th Voted Out; Day 22	Quit; Day 24	14th
Mensur Berbatovci; 43, Karlskrona	South Team	South Team			Lost Challenge; Day 16	Medically evacuated Day 30	13th
Amadeus Harrysson; Returned to Game	West Team	South Team			Lost Duel; Day 14	Won Challenge; Day 30	
Nathalie Eliasson; 32, Stockholm	East Team	South Team	South Team	Robinson	6th Voted Out; Day 27	Lost Challenge; Day 31	12th
Aza Altonchi; 38, Malmö	South Team	South Team		Robinson	7th Voted Out; Day 34		11th
Sonja Rudqvist; Returned to Game	West Team	North Team	North Team	Robinson	Lost Challenge; Day 30	Won Challenge; Day 35	
Anna Pehrson; 25, Örebro	North Team	North Team			4th Voted Out; Day 18	Lost Challenge; Day 36	10th
Iki Gonzalez Magnusson; Returned to Game	North Team	North Team	North Team		Lost Challenge; Day 24	Won Challenge; Day 38	
Caroline Järgren; Returned to Game		South Team	North Team	Robinson	Lost Challenge; Day 30	Won Challenge; Day 38	
Lasse Lundholm; 58, Halmstad	West Team	North Team	North Team	Robinson	Lost Challenge; 1st Jury Member; Day 38		9th
Halil Bas; 26, Stockholm		North Team	South Team	Robinson	8th Voted Out; 2nd Jury Member; Day 38		8th
Ola Birgersson; 57, Köpingsvik	South Team	South Team	South Team	Robinson	Lost Challenge; 3rd Jury Member; Day 39		7th
Jonas Källqvist; 33, Kinna	West Team	North Team	North Team	Robinson	Lost Challenge; 4th Jury Member; Day 40		6th
Amadeus Harrysson; 27, Gothenburg	West Team	South Team		Robinson	Lost Challenge; 5th Jury Member; Day 41		5th
Marie Werkestam; 40, Örnsköldsvik	North Team	North Team	North Team	Robinson	8th Voted Out; Day 42		4th
Caroline Järgren; 37, Stockholm		South Team	North Team	Robinson	2nd Runner-up; Day 43		3rd
Iki Gonzalez Magnusson; 42, Enköping	North Team	North Team	North Team	Robinson	Runner-up; Day 43		2nd
Sonja Fredriksdotter Rudqvist; 28, Karlstad	West Team	North Team	North Team	Robinson	Robinson; Day 43		1st

== Voting history ==
#	Original Tribe
Cycle	1
Tribe	
Eliminated	
Votes	
Amadeus	
Anja	
Anna	
Aydin	
Aza	
Carl-Oscar	
Erika	
Hanna	
Iki	
Jonas	
Lasse	
Lema	
Marie	
Melina	
Mensur	
Nathalie	
Ola	
Sebastian	
Sonja	
Waldo	
