= Clara Henry =

Swedish actress, blogger, comedian, television presenter and author

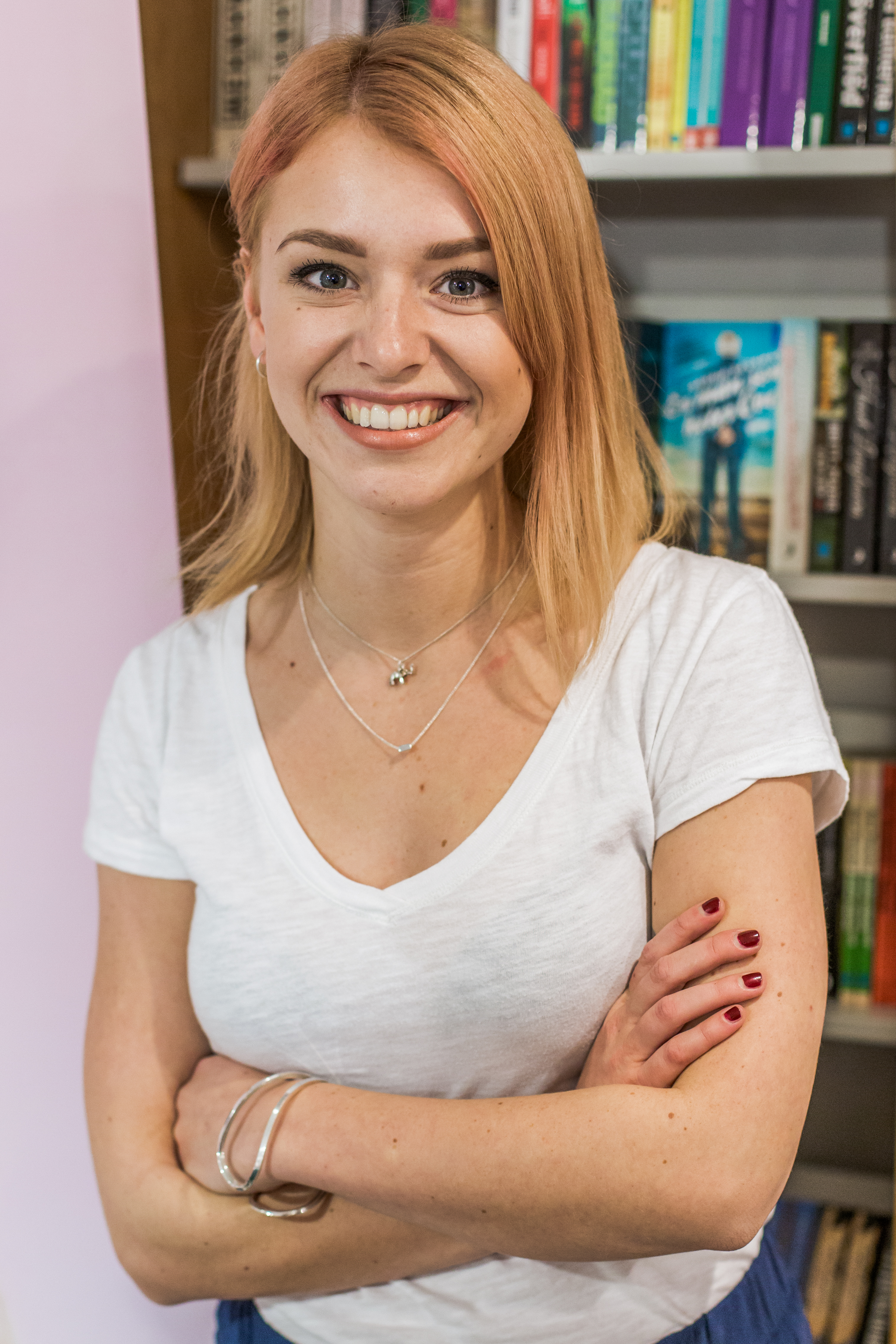
- Clara Henry in November 2015
- Born: Clara Susanna Henry; 9 April 1994 (age 32); Landvetter, Sweden
- Occupations: Author; comedian

YouTube information
- Channel: tahultsbarn
- Years active: 2009–present
- Genre: Comedy
- Subscribers: 367 thousand
- Views: 79.2 million
- Last updated: 31 August 2024

Clara Susanna Henry (born 9 April 1994) is a Swedish actress, blogger, comedian, television presenter and author. She has approximately 372,000 subscribers on her YouTube channel and hosts her own talk show on Swedish TV station Kanal 5. She has also been a backstage reporter at two editions of the national-level music competition Melodifestivalen, produced by the broadcasting company SVT.

== Early life and education ==
Clara Henry grew up in Gökskulla, Landvetter. She has one younger sister named Kimberly and a younger brother named Christoffer. Her father, Graham, was born in Wycombe in England to Irish parents, and her mother, Petra, is Swedish.

In 2010, she attended the Ingrid Segerstedt Secondary School, studying in the society economics program with a special subject of journalism.

== Career ==
As a teenager Henry worked as a youth reporter for the newspaper Göteborgs-Posten. Since 2005 she has been active on blogs such as Nöjesguiden, Devote and the magazine Veckorevyn. She started posting videos on YouTube in 2011, and in 2013 hosted a talk show on Kanal 5 where she interviewed guests and performed comedy sketches. In the spring of 2014, Henry starred in a second season of her talk show, this time entitled Häng med Clara Henry (English: Hang Out With Clara Henry), where instead of sitting in a studio and talking, she met each of her guests and hung out for an entire day. She was named "Vlogger of the Year" at Veckorevyn's Blog Awards 2013.

Henry presented the Melodifestivalen 2014 pre-show and after-show talks, where she interviewed the winners of the semifinals and other guests on SVT. On 15 April 2014, she presented the Guldtuben-gala, for the online network SPlay, in which an award is given to Sweden's best YouTube star. At this gala Henry won an award for best vlog channel.

Along with the comedian and TV personality William Spetz, Henry participated in the SVT comedy show Valfeber, which satirized the upcoming 2014 general elections in Sweden. On 30 June 2015 Henry presented an episode of the Sveriges Radio show Sommar i P1 in which she discussed her life. In September of the same year, Henry's first book, Ja jag har mens, hurså? (English: I've Got My Period, So What?), on the subject of "menstrual periods and why women should not be ashamed to talk about them", began to be distributed by the Swedish publishing house Forum. After the book's release, Henry held a lecture tour themed YouTube på blodigt allvar (English: YouTube Deadly Serious) in multiple cities across Sweden, namely Borås and Uppsala.

In December 2015, Henry worked as a travelling reporter for radio-television campaign Musikhjälpen. Among other places, she went to the Philippines to meet families that had been affected by Typhoon Melor. On 30 September 2016, SVT announced that Henry would host all six shows of Melodifestivalen 2017 alongside David Lindgren and Hasse Andersson.

In December 2016, Henry revealed that she is pansexual.

She joined the reality show Robinson 2020 as a contestant in the middle of the season. She was chosen into team South before reaching the merger and eventually the top 3 final where she ended second, after Michael Björklund.

In 2021, Henry is presenting the game show Vem kan vad which is broadcast on SVT.

== Books ==
Henry published her first book, "Ja jag har mens, hurså?" (English: Yes, I'm on my period, so what?) because she wondered why the topic on menstruation and bleeding was kept silent. To work on the stigmas, she has made a video about various creative ways of carrying menstrual products to the bathroom - seriously and as a joke. She notes that changing menstrual protection in school has always been a bit of a project. Not hiding tampons, pads, and menstrual cups feels 'a little provocative, almost'. Translations of the book are available in English and German.

Henry published her second book "Mot framtiden: En simpel guide till att krossa patriarkatat" (English: "Into the future: A simple guide to cross patriarchy) in 2018. It is presented as feminism being a lifehack, a fun guide to feminism. The book is about women's history, Clara Henry's own story, and contains research and tips.

== Feminism ==
Henry explained in a section of the Swedish show Nyhetsmorgon (TV4): 'Grundkursen i feminism är att inte ta skit' on 22 September 2018 her definition of feminism. For her, feminism is "social, political, and economic equality between the sexes." Further on, it means to have the same rights, opportunities, and obligations as everyone else in one's vicinity. Some kind of lifebuoy that you cling on to. In the end, she summarized the term to the following solution: "We are all human beings of equal value. That is it, what we have to achieve."

In an interview with the Swedish newspaper 'Göteborgs Posten' by Sofia Andersson and Fanny Wijk in 2018, Clara Henry talked about that we are constantly reminded that people prefer not to call themselves feminists, not least in the election campaign. However, many politicians like to talk about gender equality. "Have people misunderstood the word, or has it taken on more meanings than it had?" asks GP's Fanny Wijk. It sounds feminine, and it's scary and dangerous. However, we have learned that the feminine is a little worse than the masculine and neutral, says Clara Henry. During the conversation, Clara Henry's resistance in hatred and concrete threats is mentioned. Although it is mentally draining, she feels driven to continue. "I'm so severely forced. As a public woman, you have to do things like this. I'm not going to think, 'he took me by the ass, but yeah, that was probably just a sign that he thought I was a little cute'," she says.

== Bibliography ==
- Henry, Clara (2015). Ja jag har mens, hurså? [Yes, I've Got My Period, So What?] (in Swedish). Stockholm: Forum. ISBN 9789137145549.
- Henry, Clara (2018). Mot framtiden: en simpel guide till att krossa patriarkatet [Into the future: A simple guide on smashing the patriarchy] (in Swedish). Forum. ISBN 9789137153094.
