= Gökskulla =

Coordinates: 57.6928°N 12.1728°E

Gökskulla is a residential area in Tahult, Landvetter in Härryda Municipality in Sweden. Television presenter Clara Henry was born here.
