= Terry Alderton =

English comedian

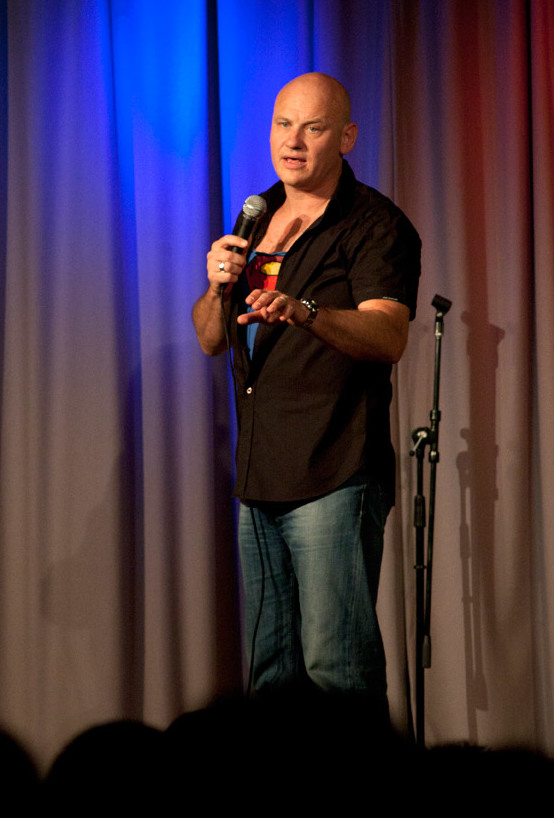
- Alderton in 2010
- Born: Terry John Alderton; 31 October 1970 (age 55); Rochford, Essex, England
- Occupations: Comedian, actor, television presenter
- Years active: 1999–present
- Spouse: Dee Ivens (m. 2001)
- Website: terryalderton.com

Terry John Alderton (born 31 October 1970) is an English comedian who had acting and presenting roles in the early 2000s before returning to stand-up comedy a decade later.

== Personal life ==
Alderton was born on 31 October 1970 in Rochford, Essex. He married a former model and Page Three Girl Dee Ivens in 2001 in Epping Forest. He has a sister named Corinna.

== Career ==
Alderton began his career as a goalkeeper with Southend United. Later he moved on to comedy. In 2004 the club re-signed him after injuries weakened their squad, following his performance in goal for the Celebrities team in the Sky One reality television series The Match.

In 1999, Alderton was nominated for the Perrier Comedy Award. Later that year, television producer Johnny Finch himself attempted to launch his own BBC TV show dedicated to video games titled Bleeding Thumbs. The series would have run between 1999 and 2000, and had hoped to emulate the success of the 1990s Channel 4 show GamesMaster, for which Finch was part of the production team as well as being a co-commentator. Two pilots were created hosted by Dermot O'Leary and Kate Thornton, and then Alderton accompanying Thornton; the commissioning editor decommissioned the show claiming that "People want to play games, not watch them".

Alderton went on to present the National Lottery show Red Alert with Lulu later that year. In 2001, he hosted The Joy of Text with Ulrika Jonsson. He has also presented his own show on Capital Radio called Terry's Turnstiles. He was also confirmed as a presenter on Setanta Sports News channel. He also appeared on the Comedy Central show Comedy Store.

On 3 September 2016, Alderton teamed up with Tim Vine for Pointless Celebrities, returning with Jack Carroll on 10 February 2018 and Joe Pasquale on 10 November 2018. On 11 January 2019, he appeared on Celebrity Mastermind.

=== Acting career ===
Alderton has also worked as an actor, one of his bigger roles was as the character Charlie Mead in the final series of London's Burning. He currently presents a number of video shows on Virgin Media Sport. His characters include Mr Sheepskin and Danny Dire. He made his West End London début when he performed his one-man show at the Bloomsbury Theatre on 21 May 2010. In 2013, he joined the cast of EastEnders as cockney cab driver Terry Spraggan.
