= Nicklas Söderblom =

Swedish actor, writer, and personal trainer

Nicklas Söderblom is a personal trainer, actor, and author currently residing in Los Angeles, United States. Söderblom is a personal trainer to many Hollywood stars (Pierce Brosnan, Olivia Newton-John, Rick Springfield, Linda Hamilton, and Backstreet Boys star AJ McLean and many more.) In 2007 he released the book Desperate Houseman writing about his relationship with actress Nicollette Sheridan, to whom he was engaged for a time.

In 2018, he was a contestant on Robinson: Fiji, and again in 2019 he was a contestant on Robinson 2019 which is broadcast on TV4.

== Bibliography ==
- 2007 – Desperate Houseman

== TV appearances ==
- Dr. Quinn, Medicine Woman (episode "Having it All")
- Spin City (episode "Fight Flub")
