= Robinson 2024 =

Season of television series

- Season 24
- Presented by: Anders Lundin
- No. of days: 42
- No. of castaways: 22
- Winner: Olivia Lindegren
- Runners-up: Maureen Asic; Simone Sjöström
- Location: Caramoan, Philippines

Release
- Original network: TV4
- Original release: 17 March – 26 May 2024

Season chronology
- ← Previous; Philippines Next → Palawan

Robinson 2024 is the twenty-fourth season of the Swedish reality television series Robinson. The season takes place in Caramoan, Philippines and broadcast on TV4; presented by Anders Lundin.

The main twist this season is that the teams are divided by gender with the North Team consisting of women and the South Team consisting of men where they compete in challenge to try and win the grand prize of 500,000 kr. and the title of Robinson. The season premiered on 17 March 2024. The season concluded on 26 May 2024 where Olivia Lindegren won in the final challenge against Maureen Asic and Simone Sjöström to win the grand prize and become the first woman to win the title of Robinson since 2012.

== Contestants ==
This seasons 22 contestants was presented on 13 February 2024. New for this season is that the tribes will be divided by gender, women versus men.

Contestant	Original Tribe	First Swapped Tribe	Second Swapped Tribe	Post-Duel Tribe	Merged Tribe	Voted Out	The Borderlands	Finish
Desirée Forsberg Fors; 32, Sollefteå	North Team					Lost Duel; Day 6		22nd Day 6
Kemo Samateh; 36, Lund	South Team					Medically evacuated Day 7		21st Day 7
Helen Lindborg; 33, Älvsjö; Malaysia							Lost Duel; Day 11	20th Day 11
Pontus Croneld; 28, Stockholm	South Team					2nd Voted Out; Day 2	Lost Duel; Day 15	19th Day 15
Zayera Khan; Returned to Game	North Team					1st Voted Out; Day 2	Won Duel; Day 18	
Pål Schakonat; Returned to Game	South Team	South Team				3rd Voted Out; Day 10	Won Duel; Day 18	
Alma Skoog; Returned to Game	North Team	North Team	South Team			4th Voted Out; Day 14	Won Duel; Day 18	
Hanna Danemyr; 44, Stockholm	North Team	North Team	North Team	North Team		Quit; Day 19		18th Day 19
Fredrik Bolander; 40, Vikingstad	South Team	South Team	North Team			Lost Duel; Day 18	Quit; Day 20	17th Day 20
Lars Koefoed; 58, Stockholm	South Team	South Team	North Team	North Team		5th Voted Out; Day 22		16th Day 22
Charlotta Hedlund; 30, Oslo, Norway	North Team	North Team	North Team			Lost Duel; Day 18	Quit; Day 23	15th Day 23
Simone Sjöström; Returned to Game	North Team	North Team	North Team			Lost Duel; Day 18	Won Duel; Day 27	
Rooble Gedi; Returned to Game	South Team	South Team	North Team	North Team	Robinson	Lost Challenge; Day 27		
Marcus Håkanson; Returned to Game	South Team	South Team	South Team	South Team		6th Voted Out; Day 26	Won Duel; Day 31	
Karin Nilsson; 48, Ängelholm	North Team	South Team	South Team	South Team	Robinson	Lost Duel; Day 30	Lost Duel; Day 31	14th Day 31
Ci Lindström; 59, Danderyd	North Team	North Team	South Team	South Team	Robinson	Lost Challenge; Day 30	Lost Duel; Day 32	13th Day 32
Mark Bannon; 34, Fellingsbro	South Team	North Team	South Team	South Team	Robinson	Eliminated; Day 28	Lost Duel; Day 34	12th Day 34
Alexander Strandberg; Entered Game							Won Duel; Day 34	
Gustav Jacobson; 27, Falun	South Team	South Team	South Team	South Team	Robinson	Lost Challenge; Day 34		11th Day 34
Pelle Flood; 28, Stockholm	South Team	South Team	South Team	South Team	Robinson	7th Voted Out; Day 34		10th Day 34
Zayera Khan; 49, Huddinge	North Team			North Team	Robinson	Lost Challenge; 1st Jury Member; Day 38		9th Day 38
Pål Schakonat; 30, Malmö	South Team	South Team		North Team	Robinson	8th Voted Out; 2nd Jury Member; Day 38		8th Day 38
Rooble Gedi; 32, Fisksätra	South Team	South Team	North Team	North Team	Robinson	Lost Challenge; 3rd Jury Member; Day 39		7th Day 39
Alma Skoog; 25, Älmhult	North Team	North Team	South Team	North Team	Robinson	Lost Challenge; 4th Jury Member; Day 40		6th Day 40
Alexander Strandberg; 44, Halmstad; Malaysia					Robinson	Lost Challenge; 5th Jury Member; Day 41		5th Day 41
Marcus Håkanson; 47, Lidingö	South Team	South Team	South Team	South Team	Robinson	11th Voted Out; Day 41		4th Day 41
Simone Sjöström; 24, Luleå	North Team	North Team	North Team		Robinson	2nd Runner-up; Day 42		3rd Day 42
Maureen Asic; 39, Stockholm	North Team	North Team	North Team	North Team	Robinson	Runner-up; Day 42		2nd Day 42
Olivia Lindegren; 27, Gothenburg	North Team	North Team	North Team	North Team	Robinson	Robinson; Day 42		1st Day 42

== Voting history ==
	Original tribes				Second switched tribes		Post-duel tribes		Merged tribe				
Cycle	1				2	3	5	6		7	8	9	10
Episode	1		2	6	11	16	26	31		36	41	46	51
Tribe	North	South	South	North	South	South	North	South		Robinson	Robinson	Robinson	Robinson
Voted Out	Zayera	Tie	Pontus	Desirée	Pål	Alma	Lars	Ci Marcus	Marcus	Zayera	Pelle	Pål	Marcus
Vote	8-0	4-4	5-3	8-1	4-3-1	5-2-1	5-2	2-2-0	2-0	4-2-0	7-2	4-3-1-0	0-3-3 (Note: Olivia, and the five members of the jury, had to vote for either Marcus, Maureen, or Simone to advance to the Final Three. The two castaways who received the most votes advanced to the Final Three, eliminating the castaway with the fewest votes.)
Voter	Vote												
Olivia	Zayera			Karin			Lars			~~Pelle~~	Pelle	Alexander	Simone
Maureen	Zayera			Karin			Lars			~~Pelle~~	Pelle	Alexander	N/A
Simone	Zayera			Karin						~~Pelle~~	Pelle	Marcus	N/A
Marcus		Pontus	Pontus		Pål	Alma		Karin	N/A	Karin (Note: This castaway cast a black vote.)	Zayera	Pål	N/A
Alexander												Pål	Simone
Alma	Zayera			Karin		Karin	Lars		Marcus	Karin	Pelle	Alexander	Maureen
Rooble		Pontus	Pontus		Gustav		Maureen		Marcus	~~Pelle~~	Pelle	Pål	Simone
Pål		Lars	Lars		Marcus	Marcus	Lars			~~Pelle~~	Pelle	Alma	Maureen
Zayera	N/A						Lars			~~Pelle~~	Pelle		Maureen
Pelle		Lars	Lars		Pål	Alma		Karin	N/A	Zayera	Zayera	Pål	
Gustav		Pontus	Pontus		Pål	Alma		Ci	N/A	Zayera			
Karin	Zayera			Simone	Pål	Alma		Marcus	N/A	Zayera			
Ci	Zayera			Karin		Alma		Marcus	N/A				
Mark		Lars	Lars			Karin		Ci	N/A				
Lars		N/A			Marcus		Maureen			Zayera			
Hanna	N/A			Karin									
Charlotta	Zayera			Karin									
Fredrik		Pontus	Pontus		Marcus								
Kemo		Lars	Pontus										
Desirée	Zayera			Karin									
Pontus		N/A											
Helen													
