= Kattis Ahlström =

Swedish journalist and television presenter

Katarina Ahlström
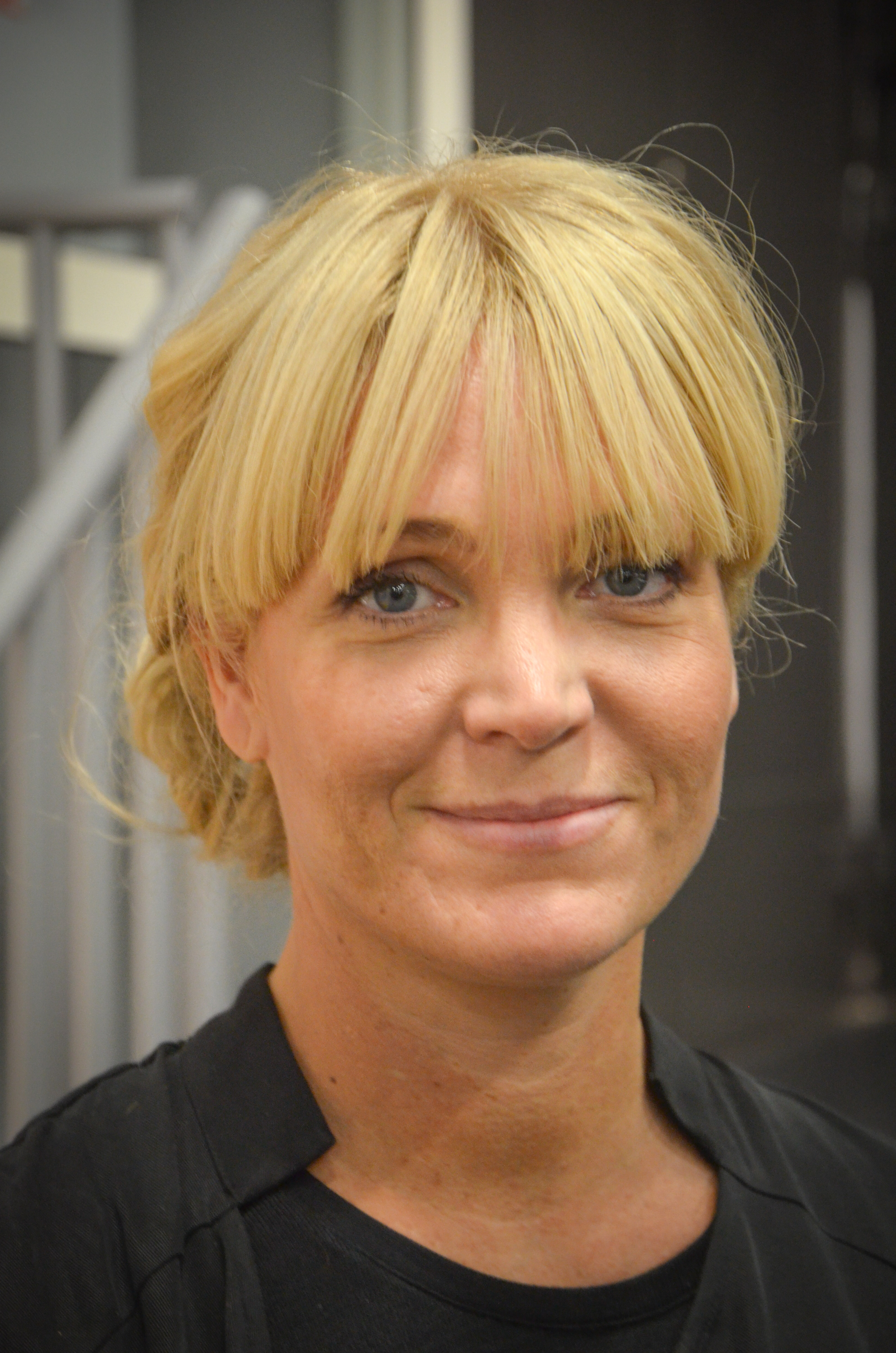
- Kattis Ahlström, 2013.
- Born: Katarina Sofie Ahlström; 9 June 1966 (age 58); Gothenburg, Sweden
- Occupation(s): Journalist, TV presenter

Katarina Sofie "Kattis" Ahlström (born 9 June 1966) is a Swedish journalist and television presenter. She is a sister of Gabriella Ahlström.

She hosted the Eurovision Song Contest 2000 together with Anders Lundin, in the Stockholm Globe Arena, and announced the Swedish results in the Eurovision Song Contest 2003. From 28 July 2006, she has been employed at the Sveriges Radio P1 channel.

== See also ==
- List of Eurovision Song Contest presenters

Preceded by (Israel) Yigal Ravid, Dafna Dekel & Sigal Shachmon	Eurovision Song Contest presenter (with Anders Lundin); 2000	Succeeded by (Denmark) Natasja Crone Back & Søren Pilmark
