= The Joy of Text =

- Genre: Entertainment; Variety; Documentary
- Directed by: Peter Orton
- Presented by: Ulrika Jonsson; Terry Alderton
- Country of origin: United Kingdom
- Original language: English

Production
- Executive producers: Jeremy Mills; Jerry Foulkes
- Producers: Lisa Clark; Nick Murphy
- Camera setup: Multi-camera
- Production company: Lion

Original release
- Network: BBC One
- Release: 9 June 2001

The Joy of Text was a themed night of television programmes centred on text messaging, shown on BBC One. It was broadcast on 9 June 2001, and featured three TV programmes: The Joy of Text: Live, Text Maniacs and X Text. The first programme, The Joy of Text: Live, was a 40-minute entertainment variety show hosted by Ulrika Jonsson and Terry Alderton, featuring celebrity guests and text-related games. This was followed by Text Maniacs, a documentary looking at surprising examples of text messaging use. X Text, the final programme, looked at the seedier side of texting.

The Joy of Text received negative reviews from media commentators, who criticised the night for its poor script and lack of entertaining content. Fewer than 3 million viewers tuned into the series. Viewers sent in a record 500,000 text messages during the show, some of which were compiled to form a tie-in book, also titled The Joy of Text.

== Programmes ==
After being commissioned by BBC One controller Lorraine Heggessey, The Joy of Text theme night was broadcast on 9 June 2001. It officially began at 7:25 p.m., with a brief five-minute introduction from TV presenter Ulrika Jonsson and comedian Terry Alderton. Jonsson and Alderton introduced the rest of the night's programmes, and invited viewers to text their favourite jokes into the show. This was followed at 8:15 p.m. by The Joy of Text: Live, a live, interactive entertainment programme. It was also hosted by Jonsson and Alderton, and ran for 40 minutes. After beginning with archive footage of mobile phone use during the 1980s, The Joy of Text: Live featured segments such as a man proposing by text to his girlfriend (who responded with "Yes I love you"), celebrity guest text messaging with pop group Hear'Say, and a text message race, where three members of the audience were challenged to text a friend asking them the name of Tony Blair's youngest child (Leo) – the winner was the first contestant to receive the correct answer back.

The Joy of Text: Live was followed at 8:55 p.m. by Text Maniacs, a documentary about use of text messaging, produced by Lion Television. Text Maniacs featured human interest stories, such as a story about a young woman whose life was saved when she texted her boyfriend to tell him that the boat that she and her friends were on had drifted out to sea. The programme also included interviews with a teenage girl who sent an average of 1,000 texts a month costing £300, and a runaway who used text to stay in contact with his family. The final programme of the evening, X Text, was a 15-minute adult-oriented show about the ruder side of texting, and was broadcast at 11:30 p.m.

== Reception ==
=== Critical reception ===
The Joy of Text was critically panned by reviewers. Writing for The Sunday Mirror, TV columnist Ian Hyland criticised The Joy of Text: Live for its poorly written script and confusing content. On his series How TV Ruined Your Life, writer Charlie Brooker retrospectively described the night as "an entire evening of text message non-fun". Alderton himself was also critical of the series, calling it "one of the worst pieces of TV in history". He explained that, as a result of Jonsson's baby suddenly falling ill, neither he nor Jonsson had had any time for rehearsals. In their annual report, the BBC had described The Joy of Text as "a novel Saturday night experience which did not altogether succeed".

=== Ratings ===
Early overnight figures suggested that The Joy of Text: Live had generated 2.9 million viewers and a 15% audience share, and that the following programme, Text Maniacs, had gained an audience of 2.8 million and a share of 14%. These ratings were described by Jason Deans, a journalist for The Guardian, as a "disaster". The most-watched programme in the same timeslot was an episode of ITV's talent show Stars in Their Eyes, which had attracted 7.4 million viewers.

== Book ==
During promotion of The Joy of Text, the BBC stated their intention to break a new record for the fastest-written book ever, using texts sent in by viewers on the night. The BBC ultimately received more than 500,000 texts over the course of the evening, breaking a record and becoming the biggest ever mass text exercise. A selection of the received text messages were compiled into an accompanying tie-in book, also titled The Joy of Text. The book was edited by Doug Young, who had previously edited the compilation book 100 Recipes in No Time at All. The Joy of Text was published by Transworld Publishers, and was released on 1 July 2001.

== See also ==
- 2001 in British television
- The Joy of Sex – a 1972 book that lends its name to this programme
