= Robinson: El Nido =

- Season 27
- Presented by: Martin Järborg
- No. of days: 42
- Location: El Nido

Release
- Original network: TV4
- Original release: 2 October 2025

Season chronology
- ← Previous; Robinson 2025 Next → Robinson 2026

Robinson: El Nido is the twenty-seventh season of the Swedish reality television series Robinson, it airs on TV4 starting on 2 October 2025. New presenter for this season is Martin Järborg.

== Contestants ==
| Name | Age | City | Start | Placement | Elimination day |
|---|---|---|---|---|---|
| Diana Akela | 36 | Stockholm | | | |
| Salah Bakir | 54 | Göteborg | | | |
| René Cautin Yanez | 47 | Malmö | | | |
| Ebba Feldhoff | 26 | Stockholm | | | |
| Johan Ekström | 35 | Stockholm | | | |
| Ulf Forsberg | 70 | Vännäs / Umeå | | | |
| Agust Helgason | 34 | Uddebo | | | |
| Charlie Lindell Beskow | 29 | Stockholm | | | |
| Emilly Lindberg | 34 | Värmdö | | | |
| Jasmine Mathiasson | 31 | Helsingborg | | | |
| Ania Mierzejewska | 32 | Göteborg | | | |
| Susanne Persson | 55 | Lidköping | | | |
| Carin Raabe | 55 | Sävedalen | | | |
| Akink Saleh | 31 | Malmö | | | |
| Matteo Pasero | 23 | Gävle | | | |
| Kevin Saritas | 23 | Uppsala | | | |
| Samuel ”Nutti” Stenman | 26 | Göteborg | | | |
| Emma Sundstedt | 26 | Stockholm | | | |
| Ann-Helene Svahn | 40 | Falköping | | | |
| Jacob Wandrell | 37 | Stockholm | | | |
| Anna Wickman Aronsson | 56 | Torslanda | | | |
