= Robinson 2020 =

Season of television series

- Season 18
- Presented by: Anders Öfvergård
- No. of days: 42
- No. of castaways: 23
- Winner: Michael Björklund
- Runners-up: Clara Henry; Priya Svang
- Location: Fiji
- No. of episodes: 51

Release
- Original network: TV4
- Original release: 15 March – 24 May 2020

Season chronology
- ← Previous; 2019 Next → 2021

Robinson 2020, also known as Robinson Fiji, is the eighteenth season of Swedish Expedition Robinson franchise. 23 contestants from all over Sweden travelled to Fiji to compete in challenges, until the two teams merged into one. After the teams merged, the contestants competed in individual challenges, hoping to win immunity to be safe from being voted out. Once three remained, they competed in a series of challenges in order to determine this year's Robinson winner. The season premiered on 15 March 2020 and ended on 24 May 2020, and was broadcast on TV4. The presenter was Anders Öfvergård. This year's winner was Michael Björklund who earned 500,000 SEK.

== Season summary ==
Team South was plagued by conflict centered around Raymond, a muscular man who wanted to dominate everything. He bullied two of the team members and people grew afraid of him to the extent that they joined him in the bullying. He garnered almost a cult-like following. Those who opposed him were voted out. It took two simultaneous twists to vote him out just before the merge. Michael was the team's chef. No one had problems with him because he stayed out of the conflicts and never spoke up against the bullying. He later revealed that he was previously Sweden's Chef of the Year and had competed in the cooking world cup.

In Team North, two physically strong men (Jonas and Hasse) took leader roles. A pact of weaker players led by Julia voted them out to save themselves.

The teams merged 5-4 but three wild cards (Christoffer, Clara and Jani) joined just before the merge, adding complexity. One player flipped in each direction (Ragnar and Mattias). All three wild cards joined Julia's Team North alliance. Because of his strong relationship with the three wild cards, spiritual man Kristove took over leadership of Julia's alliance and pulled the strings. Their alliance was in a comfortable majority. Every single player joined either alliance, a rare occurrence in Swedish Survivor.

In a twist where two players would be voted out in one vote, both alliances inevitably got to pick off one opponent, which ended Mattias' game. At Gränslandet ("The Borderlands"), Jonas had stayed alive ever since he was voted out but he was defeated by Mattias who returned to the game.

Because two of the wild cards (Chistoffer and Clara) were sway votes, some members of Kristove's alliance feared that they would flip but that never happened and the alliance held strong until the final eight where knock-out challenges began. Christoffer was clearly the biggest physical threat and Mattias was the one most likely to beat him. However, Clara, the other wild card, won plankan and Mattias was voted out in the final five. Michael voted for Mattias even though Christoffer was the biggest challenge threat because Christoffer had helped Michael in the previous challenge. Then the jury got to remove yet another player and chose Christoffer. He never made any trouble and got along with everyone but the jury didn't like that he was a wild card who joined at the merge and if they didn't vote him out, he was favored to win. All but one jury member voted for Christoffer to leave.

The final multi-stage obstacle course was contested by Michael, Clara and Priya, an under-the-radar player. Michael was the only surviving member of the Team South alliance. He had flown under the radar the whole game and was the lowest-priority player to vote off. Being overweight, no one expected him to be a threat in the knock-out challenges anyway. Although he was helped by Christoffer in a math challenge, he did survive one challenge on his own merit and most importantly, he put off a stable performance in every part of the final multi-stage obstacle course, especially in the throwing and fire-making parts, and he won it by a comfortable margin.

== Contestants ==
Contestant	Original Tribe	Kidnapped Twist	Intruders Twist	Merged Tribe	Voted Out	The Borderlands	Finish
Eva Sjöholm; 30, Bromma	South Team				1st Voted Out; Day 2		23rd
Cissi Wallin Nilsson; 21, Vallentuna	South Team				Medically evacuated Day 7		22nd
Linn Fagerholm; 28, Tyresö	North Team				2nd Voted Out; Day 7		21st
Angelica Sanchez; 44, Stockholm	North Team				3rd Voted Out; Day 10		20th
Mohammad Hassan "Hasse" Al-Naib; 33, Malmö	North Team	North Team			4th Voted Out; Day 14		19th
Pia Åkerman; 69, Visby	North Team	North Team	North Team		5th Voted Out; Day 18		18th
Ola Helt; 55, Jönköping	North Team	North Team	North Team		6th Voted Out; Day 18		17th
Raymond Ahlgren; 52, Stockholm	South Team	North Team	South Team		9th Voted Out; Day 22	Lost Duel; Day 25	16th
Nina Ekstrand; 46, Täby	South Team	South Team	South Team	Robinson	10th Voted Out; Day 26	Lost Duel; Day 29	15th
Cruise Ferreira; 22, Västerås	South Team	South Team	South Team		7th Voted Out; Day 19	Lost Duel; Day 33	14th
Ragnar Westberg Martinez; Returned to Game	North Team	North Team	North Team	Robinson	11th Voted Out; Day 30	1st Returnee; Day 34	
Josefina Liljedahl; 38, Halmstad	South Team	South Team	South Team	Robinson	12th Voted Out; Day 34	Lost Duel; 1st jury member Day 36	13th
Katarina Billman; 60, Stockholm	South Team	South Team	South Team		Lost Challenge; Day 22	Lost Duel; 2nd jury member Day 37	12th
Jonas Carlsson; 37, Stockholm	North Team	North Team	North Team		8th Voted Out; Day 19	Lost Duel; 3rd jury member Day 37	11th
Mattias Pettersson; Returned to Game	South Team	South Team	South Team	Robinson	13th Voted Out; Day 34	2nd Returnee; Day 37	
Ragnar Westberg Martinez; 21, Mellansel	North Team	North Team	North Team	Robinson	14th Voted Out; 4th jury member Day 38		10th
Fabian Thingwall; 35, Stockholm	South Team	South Team	South Team	Robinson	15th Voted Out; 5th jury member Day 38		9th
Jani Jokinen; 36, Motala			North Team	Robinson	Lost Challenge; 6th jury member Day 39		8th
Julia Franzén; 29, Los Angeles, United States	North Team	North Team	North Team	Robinson	Lost Challenge; 7th jury member Day 40		6th
Kristove Rueda; 46, Kisa	North Team	North Team	North Team	Robinson	Lost Challenge; 8th jury member Day 40		6th
Mattias Pettersson; 50, Motala	South Team	South Team	South Team	Robinson	16th Voted Out; 9th jury member Day 41		5th
Christoffer Willén; 28, Stockholm			South Team	Robinson	17th Voted Out; Day 41		4th
Priya Svang; 26, Mölndal	North Team	North Team	North Team	Robinson	Runner-up; Day 42		2nd
Clara Henry; 25, Stockholm			South Team	Robinson	Runner-up; Day 42		2nd
Michael "Micke" Björklund; 44, Sund, Åland	South Team	South Team	South Team	Robinson	Sole Survivor; Day 42		1st
