= Robinson 2019 =

Season of television series

- Season 17
- Presented by: Anders Öfvergård
- No. of days: 42
- No. of castaways: 22
- Winner: Klas Beyer
- Runner-up: Fia Grönborg
- Location: Kadavu Group, Fiji
- No. of episodes: 51

Release
- Original network: TV4
- Original release: 17 March – 26 May 2019

Season chronology
- ← Previous; Fiji Next → 2020

Robinson 2019 is the seventeenth season of Expedition Robinson. This season begins with twenty contestants being split into two tribes, competing against each other to try and win 500,000 SEK Like last season, this season was filmed in Kadavu Group, in Fiji. The season premiered on 17 March 2019 on TV4. Like last season, the season was presented by Anders Öfvergård. The season concluded on 26 May 2019 where Klas Beyer won against Fia Grönborg in a challenge to claim the title and become this year's Robinson.

== Season summary ==
Team South initially suffered from absurd amounts of conflicts, caused by a player who was there to "make good TV". He was pulled from the game. The tribe was then led by a group of athletic men (Adnilson, Lucas and Emilio). They kept losing immunity challenges. Three women (Fia, Linn and Bonnie) formed an actual alliance, which is rare in Swedish Survivor, and voted out Adnilson, gaining majority in their tribe. Both tribes developed a strong team spirit. Team North was led by Klas, a wise and diplomatic man who had good relationships with every player in the game. In Team North, Sebastian was arguably the strongest physical player in the game. He formed a strong relationship with Anna but was voted off for being disliked by the other players.

Just before the merge, Team North lost multiple players to twists and Team South merged with five players against four. However, one member of Team North (Sophie) found a chest with three extra votes. A rare occurrence in Swedish Survivor, both tribes stuck together after the merge, which resulted in Team North voting off Lucas, making it 4 vs 4.

There were two islands separate from the main game: Gränslandet (The Borderland) and Utposten (The Outpost). Before the merge, challenge losers and players voted out went to Gränslandet and after the merge, they went to Utposten. Sebastian eventually returned from Gränslandet. Because he was blindsided by Team North before the merge, there were still hard feelings between them. Team South used that by making false alliances with both sides of Team North, playing them out against each other under the false premise of a permanent alliance. The other three players who returned from Gränslandet and Utposten were ultimately inconsequential.

Knock-out challenges began at final eight. Just before that, everyone ganged up and voted out Sebastian, the biggest threat. Despite Team South consisting of three rather physically weak women, there were three even weaker players in the final eight. The final five therefore consisted of the Team South Alliance (the three women's alliance + Emilio) and Klas.

At final four, there was an unexpected final tribal council. The jury decided who was immune and chose Klas, who would likely have been voted off otherwise by the Team South alliance. Because of the weak opposition, Klas, a physically average man, finished first in every knock-out challenge. Therefore, he had three advantages in the final three challenge, which he also won. Fortunately for him, Emilio was knocked out in the final three, which put Klas against Fia in the final multi-stage obstacle course. The course tested physical ability, map reading, endurance and fire making. Klas completed the course first and won the season.

== Finishing order ==
Contestant	Original Tribe	Swapped Tribe	Merged Tribe	Voted Out	The Borderlands	The Outpost	Finish
Carl-Stefan Hamilton; 29, London, England	South Team			Ejected; Day 7			22nd
Brigitta Hoffmann; 44, Gothenburg	North Team			Left Competition; Day 7			21st
Anna Wemlert; 44, Skyrup	South Team			1st Voted Out; Day 6	Lost Duel to Nick; Day 8		20th
Cathrine Hardenborg; 48, Stockholm					Lost Duel to Adnilson; Day 13		19th
Adnilson Costa da Cruz; 28, Västervik	South Team			2nd Voted Out; Day 11	Lost Duel to Sebastian; Day 18		18th
Åsa Engström; 29, Stockholm	South Team			Lost Duel to Fia; Day 22	Lost Duel to Jannika; Day 23		17th
Suzana Dahlhjelm; 56, Linköping	North Team	South Team		4th Voted Out; Day 26	Lost Duel to Peter; Day 27		16th
Nick Söderblom; Entered Game					Won Duel; Day 28		
Sebastian Larsson; Returned to Game	North Team			3rd Voted Out; Day 16	Won Duel; Day 28		
Lucas Crespo Peñaloza; 26, Stockholm	South Team	North Team	Robinson	5th Voted Out; Day 31			15th
Sophie Hanson; 31, Los Angeles, United States	North Team	South Team	Robinson	6th Voted Out; Day 35			14th
Nick Söderblom; 53, Kungsbacka; Season 17, 18th Place			Robinson	Medically evacuated Day 37			13th
Robert Åhrman; Returned to Game	North Team	South Team		Lost Challenge; Day 26		Voted In; Day ?	
Anna Dahlbom; 22, Malmö	North Team	South Team	Robinson	7th Voted Out; Day ?			12th
Sebastian Larsson; 31, Gothenburg	North Team		Robinson	8th Voted Out; Day ?			11th
Peter Feuk; 59, Åseda	North Team			Lost Duel; Day 3	Lost Duel Sent to The Outpost; Day 28	Lost Challenge; Day ?	10th
Mathias Kristoffersson; 42, Borgafjäll	North Team	South Team	Robinson	Lost Challenge; Day 28		Lost Challenge; Day ?	9th
Jannika Navjord; Returned to Game				Lost Duel; Day 3	Lost Duel Sent to The Outpost; Day 28	Won Challenge; Day ?	
Robert Åhrman; 46, Kinna	North Team	South Team	Robinson	Lost Challenge; Day ?			8th
Tobias Bjurmark; 28, Stockholm	North Team	South Team	Robinson	Lost Challenge; Day ?			7th
Jannika Navjord; 43, Stockholm			Robinson	Lost Challenge; Day ?			6th
Linn Lund; 29, Arvesund	South Team	North Team	Robinson	Lost Challenge; Day ?			5th
Bonnie Almerstedt; 45, Stockholm	South Team	North Team	Robinson	9th Voted Out; Day ?			4th
Emilio Strukelj; 28, Gothenburg	South Team	North Team	Robinson	Lost Challenge; Day ?			3rd
Fia Grönborg; 23, Stockholm	South Team	North Team	Robinson	Runner-up; Day ?			2nd
Klas Beyer; 30, Umeå	North Team	North Team	Robinson	Robinson; Day ?			1st
