= Yigal Ravid =

Israeli radio and television presenter

- יגאל רביד
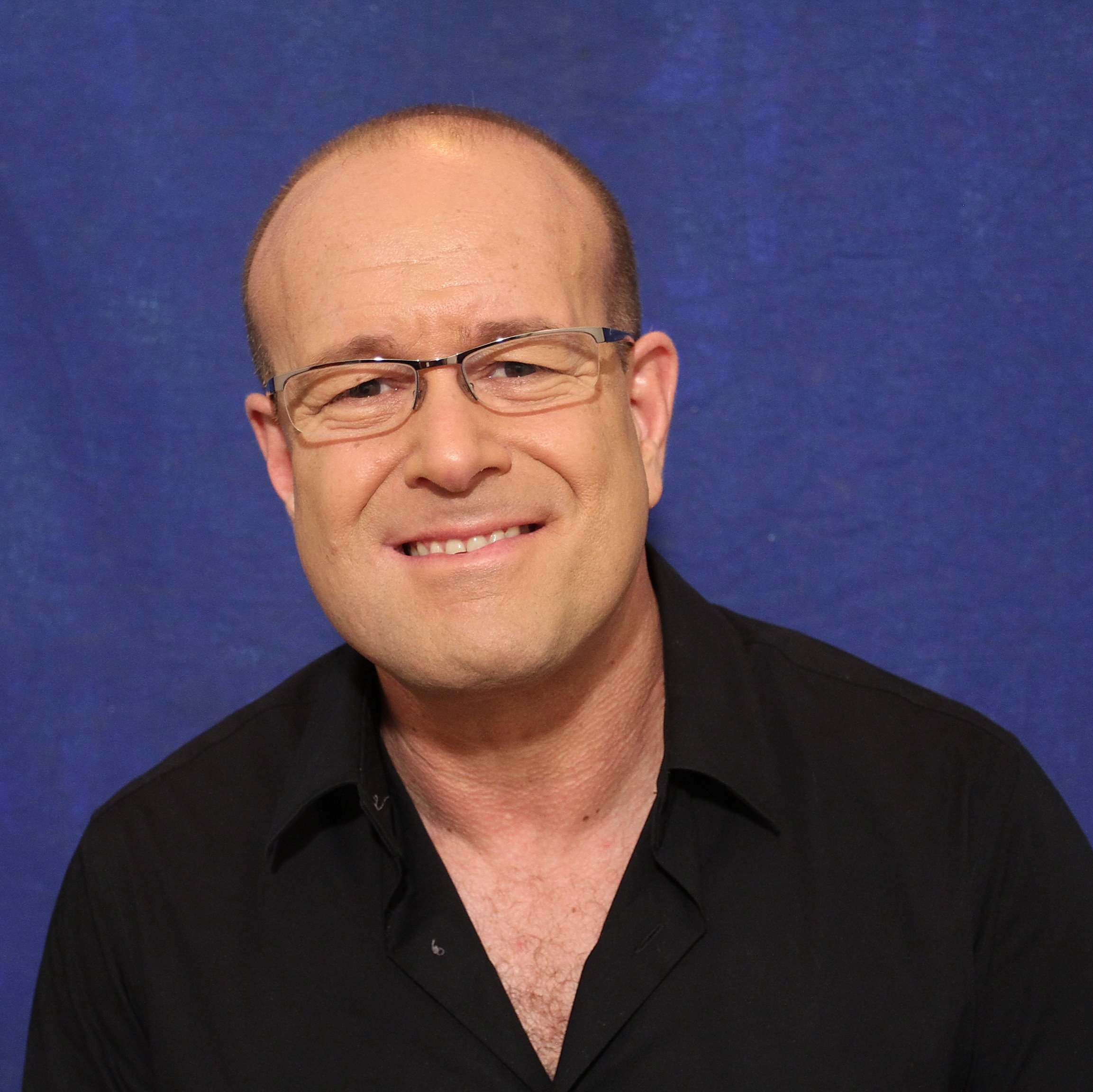
- Born: 13 August 1957 (age 69); Tel Aviv, Israel
- Occupations: Journalist; TV host; newsreader
- Years active: 1983–present
- Children: 2

Yigal Ravid (Hebrew: יגאל רביד; born 13 August 1957) is an Israeli radio and television presenter, best known for hosting the Eurovision Song Contest 1999 in Jerusalem.

== Early life ==
Yigal Ravid was born in Tel Aviv in 1957. He was a student at the Tel-Aviv Herzeliya High School. Ravid then attended the Tel Aviv University, where he studied Political Science achieving an undergraduate in Bachelor of Arts. Yigal enrolled with the young journalists' scheme after he received a scholarship at the John Kennedy Foundation. He continued his education at the University of New York where he studied for a Master of Arts degree in communications.

Yigal's began his professional journalism with the Galei Tzahal, a nationwide Israeli army radio network operated by the Israel Defense Forces. Between 1983 and 1989 Ravid continued his journalism career as a newsreader working for Kol Yisrael, public domestic and international radio service, operated as a division of the Israel Broadcasting Authority. It was during this time that he also presented a music show on the Israeli radio station, Reshet Gimel.

Before returning as an editor and newsreader for Kol Yisrael in 1993, Yigal worked for Israel Radio International as a journalist while undergoing further educational studies in America. In 1996 he continued his newsreader career for Israeli network Channel 1, where he then switched channels in 1998 and presented news programs for Channel 2. Yigal is fluent in many languages including English, French, and German, as well as his native tongue Hebrew.

== Eurovision Song Contest ==
Yigal has appeared twice at the Eurovision Song Contest. In 1998, he presented the Israeli vote. After the Israeli victory that year, the contest was held in Jerusalem in 1999, which Ravid co-hosted along with Dafna Dekel and Sigal Shachmon.

== Personal life ==
Ravid is openly gay and has been living in Los Angeles with his partner since July 2019. On 19 December 2024, they welcomed twins via surrogacy.

== Career ==
=== Radio ===
Year	Title	Role	Notes
1983–1989	Kol Yisrael	Newsreader	-
1983–1989	Reshet Gimel	Presenter	Music show
1990–1992	Israel Radio International	Journalist	-
1993	Kol Yisrael	Editor	-

=== Television ===
Year	Title	Role	Notes
1993–2003	Channel 2 News	Newsreader	-
1996, 2003–2017	Channel One News	Editor and newsreader	-
1998	Eurovision Song Contest 1998	Israeli spokesperson	1 episode
1999	Eurovision Song Contest 1999	Host	1 episode
2002	Only in Israel	Himself	1 episode

== See also ==
- List of Eurovision Song Contest presenters
- Eurovision Song Contest 1999
- Israel Broadcasting Authority

Preceded by (United Kingdom) Ulrika Jonsson & Terry Wogan	Eurovision Song Contest presenter (with Dafna Dekel & Sigal Shachmon); 1999	Succeeded by (Sweden) Kattis Ahlström & Anders Lundin
