= Natasja Crone Back =

Danish journalist and TV show presenter

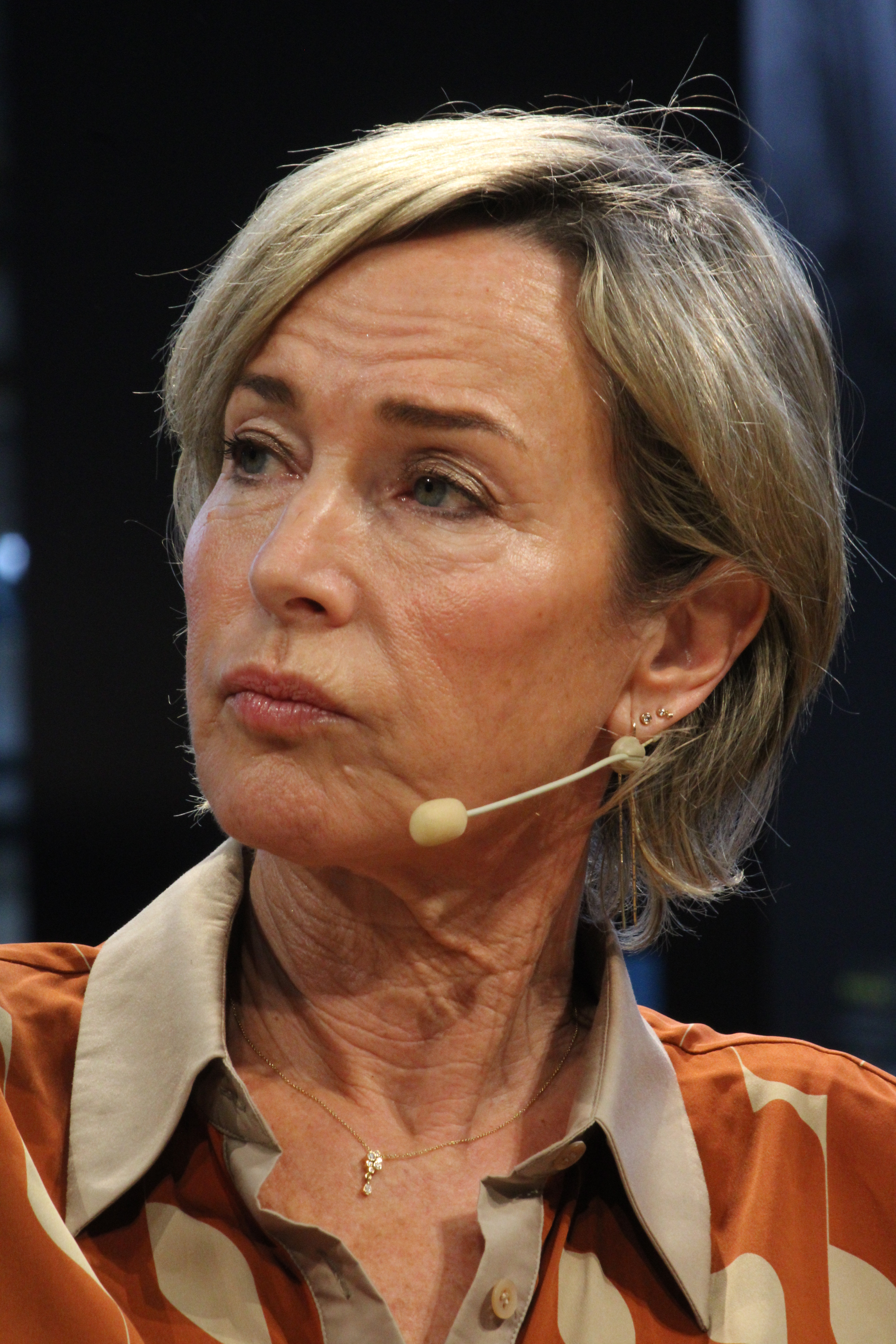
- Crone in 2025
- Born: Natasja Crone; 12 June 1970 (age 55); Copenhagen, Denmark
- Education: Danish School of Media and Journalism
- Occupations: Journalist and television presenter
- Spouse: Nikolaj Back (m. 1998; div. 2004)
- Children: 1
- Parent(s): Nina and Erik Crone

Natasja Crone Back (born 12 June 1970) is a Danish journalist and TV show presenter. She is well known from several big shows on Danish television.

== Early life and career ==
Crone was raised in Holte north of Copenhagen and is of Danish and Belarusian Jewish parentage. 8 In 1996 she finished journalist school. During her studies, she was involved in the debating programme Planet Danmark. She did the practical part of her studies at the newspaper Berlingske Tidende.

After her studies Back became a journalist for Danmarks Radio (DR). She hosted a sports programme from 1998 to 2000. In 2000 she started working at DR's Light Entertainment Division. Later, she was attached to DR Event, a division catering to major events ranging from award shows to elections.

Natasja Crone Back hosted the millennium New Year's Eve show, the Dansk Melodi Grand Prix (Danish Song Contest) in both 2000 and 2004, and the Eurovision Song Contest 2001.

She featured on Johnny Logan's cover version of "Let's Make Love". The song was released as a single in 2001 and featured on his ninth studio album, Reach for Me.

Since December 2006 she has been part of the TV 2 News staff.

== Personal life ==
Crone Back is divorced from Nikolaj Back. Together, they have a son named Samuel.

== See also ==
- List of Eurovision Song Contest presenters

Preceded by (Sweden) Kattis Ahlström & Anders Lundin	Eurovision Song Contest presenter (with Søren Pilmark); 2001	Succeeded by (Estonia) Annely Peebo & Marko Matvere
