= Sigal Shachmon =

Israeli television presenter

- סיגל שחמון
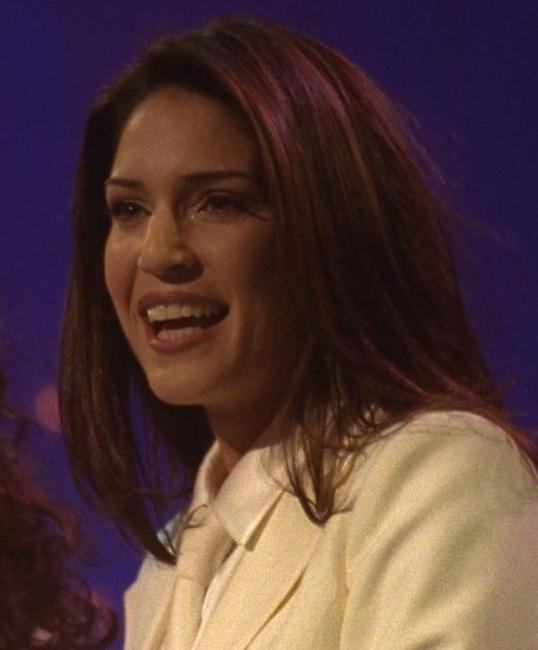
- Born: 13 June 1971 (age 54); Petah Tikva, Israel
- Occupations: Model, actress and television presenter
- Years active: 1995–present

Sigal Shachmon (Hebrew: סיגל שחמון; born 13 June 1971) is an Israeli model, actress and television presenter.

== Life and career ==
Shachmon was born in Petah Tikva. Prior to her big breakthrough, she was a dancer and worked in modeling. In 1989 she performed at the Israeli national final for the Eurovision Song Contest as one of Nissim Gama's accompaniments in his song "Passes With Time". In 1995, Shachmon auditioned for the Israeli version of Wheel of Fortune (Galgal HaMazal), but lost the role to Ruth Gonzales. Erez Tal saw the potential of Shachmon and took her to guide his show The Wonderful World. At the same time, Gonzalez finished her role as a Wheel of Fortune girl and was replaced by Shachamon in 1996.

Between 1998 and 1999, Shachmon co-hosted Channel 2's version of Fort Boyard (המבצר - Ha-Mivtzar) alongside Aki Avni and program introductions alongside Nati Ravitz, after which she received her own program titled Sparkling.

In 1999 she hosted the Eurovision Song Contest 1999, which took place in Jerusalem's International Convention Center, together with Yigal Ravid and Dafna Dekel.

=== Personal life ===
She had a relationship with actor Aki Avni. In December 2002 she married businessman Ofer Amir, and in December 2004 her eldest son was born. She separated from her husband in 2007, about two months before giving birth to her second son.

Shachmon lives in Rishpon.

== See also ==
- List of Eurovision Song Contest presenters

Preceded by (United Kingdom) Ulrika Jonsson and Terry Wogan	Eurovision Song Contest presenter (with Dafna Dekel and Yigal Ravid); 1999	Succeeded by (Sweden) Kattis Ahlström and Anders Lundin
