= Robinson: Malaysia =

Season of television series

- Season 21
- Presented by: Petra Malm
- No. of days: 42
- No. of castaways: 22
- Winner: Lars-Olov Johansson
- Runners-up: Martin Larsson; Kristofer Nystedt
- Location: Malaysia, near the Strait of Malacca
- No. of episodes: 51

Release
- Original network: TV4
- Original release: 9 October – 18 December 2022

Additional information
- Filming dates: 14 April – 25 May 2022

Season chronology
- ← Previous; 2022 Next → 2023

Robinson: Malaysia is the twenty-first season of the Swedish reality television series and the second season of 2022. This season was also the first to have Petra Malm as presenter. The season premiered on 9 October 2022 on TV4 and ended on 18 December 2022. Lars-Olov Johansson won and thus earned 500.000 SEK.

== Contestants ==
Contestant	Original Tribe	Day 5 Tribe	Post-Exchange Tribe	Merged Tribe	Voted Out	The Borderlands	Finish
Andreas Haraldsson; Returned to Game					Eliminated; Day 1	Swapped; Day 8	
Martin Larsson; Returned to Game					Eliminated; Day 1	Swapped; Day 8	
Christina Nordback; 34, Stockholm; 2022						Lost Duel; Day 5	22nd Day 5
Markus Andersson; 24, Helsingborg	North Team	North Team			Eliminated; Day 8	Left Competition; Day 8	21st Day 8
Linda Nehlstedt; 52, Sjöbo	North Team	North Team			1st Voted Out; Day 6	Lost Duel; Day 9	20th Day 9
Sofia Spendler; Returned to Game	South Team	South Team	South Team		3rd Voted Out; Day 13		
Pernilla Johansson; 32, Kivik	South Team	South Team			Eliminated; Day 8	Lost Duel; Day 13	19th Day 13
Merdi Losokola; Returned to Game	South Team				Lost Duel; Day 2	Won Duel; Day 16	
Valentino Demina; 31, Stockholm	North Team	North Team	North Team		Lost Challenge; Day 17		18th Day 17
Pelle Lilja; 58, Enskede	South Team	South Team	South Team		Quit Due to Family Emergency; Day 17		17th Day 17
Ulf Ström; 65, Stockholm	North Team	North Team	North Team		Quit Due to Family Emergency; Day 17		16th Day 17
Julie Joanzon; 20, Vänersborg	North Team	North Team	North Team		4th Voted Out; Day 17	Medically Evacuated; Day 18	15th Day 18
Nathalie Johansson; 26, Västerås	South Team	South Team	South Team		Lost Duel; Day 13	Medically Evacuated; Day 21	14th Day 21
Sandra Cucarano; Entered Game						Won Duel; Day 21	
Helen Lindborg; Returned to Game	South Team	South Team	South Team		2nd Voted Out; Day 10	Won Duel; Day 23	
Isabella Resmark; Entered Game						Won Duel; Day 23	
Merdi Losokola; 21, Sollentuna	South Team		North Team	Robinson	6th Voted Out; Day 26	Left Competition; Day 27	13th Day 27
Lars-Olov Johansson; Returned to Game	North Team	North Team	North Team	Robinson	Lost Challenge; Day 23	Won Duel; Day 29	
Britten Nordström; 46, Farsta strand	North Team	North Team	North Team		5th Voted Out; Day 22	Lost Duel; Day 33	12th Day 33
Greta Pierre; 23, Stockholm	South Team	South Team	South Team	Robinson	Lost Challenge; Day 23	Lost Duel; Day 33	11th Day 33
Helen Lindborg; Returned to Game	South Team	South Team	South Team	Robinson	7th Voted Out; Day 30	Won Duel; Day 33	
Sofia Spendler; 31, Visby	South Team	South Team	South Team	Robinson	8th Voted Out; Day 34		10th Day 34
Homayon Sytes; 22, Härnösand	South Team	South Team	South Team	Robinson	9th Voted Out; Day 34		9th Day 34
Andreas Haraldsson; 29, Karlstad			North Team	Robinson	10th Voted Out; 1st Jury Member; Day 38		8th Day 38
Isabella Resmark; 26, Ljungskile; 2022				Robinson	Lost Challenge; 2nd Jury Member; Day 39		7th Day 39
Sandra Cucarano; 25, Stockholm; 2022			North Team	Robinson	Lost Challenge; 3rd Jury Member; Day 40		6th Day 40
Helen Lindborg; 32, Stockholm	South Team	South Team	South Team	Robinson	Lost Challenge; 4th Jury Member; Day 41		5th Day 41
Alexander Strandberg; 43, Halmstad		South Team	South Team	Robinson	11th Voted Out; Day 41		4th Day 41
Kristofer Nystedt; 33, Stockholm	North Team	North Team	North Team	Robinson	2nd Runner-up; Day 42		3rd Day 42
Martin Larsson; 24, Täby			South Team	Robinson	Runner-up; Day 42		2nd Day 42
Lars-Olov Johansson; 44, Luleå	North Team	North Team	North Team	Robinson	Robinson; Day 42		1st Day 42

=== Future appearances ===
Pelle Lilja later returned for Robinson: Philippines where Lilja won. Alexander Strandberg and Helen Lindborg later returned for Robinson 2024.
