= Dafna Dekel =

Dafna Dekel דפנה דקל
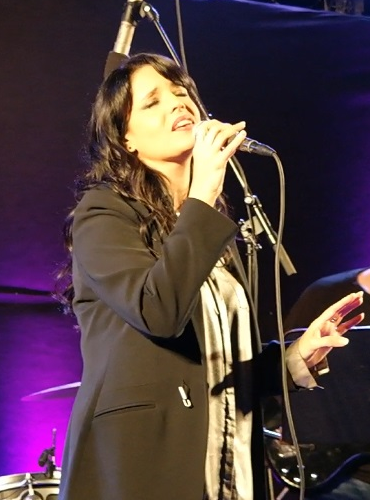
- Dekel in 2015

Background information
- Born: 7 May 1966 (age 60); Ashdod, Israel
- Genres: Pop, Rock
- Occupation: Singer
- Instrument: Vocals

Dafna Dekel (Hebrew: דַּפְנָה דֶּקֶל; born 7 May 1966) is an Israeli singer.

== Biography ==
Dafna Dekel was born in Ashdod, Israel. She was discovered while serving in the Lehakat HaNahal entertainment troupe of the Israel Defense Forces in 1985–1986. After her release from the army, Dekel was cast in the Israeli musical Salah Shabati produced in honor of Israel's 40th anniversary. In 1989, she released her first self-titled album. Although the album had 4 songs written and/or composed by Dekel, her biggest hits were songs written for her by others. In 1989, she sang in the children's holiday show "Festigal" with the song "Mah koreh li?" (What's happening to me?) and performed a Yemenite medley with the Yosefi Sisters and Margalit Tzan'ani.

In 1992, Dekel won the "Kdam" (the Israeli pre-selection to the Eurovision Song Contest with "Ze rak sport" (It's just sports). Dekel represented Israel in Sweden, winning 85 points and reaching 6th place. For the next three years, she was a regular on "Pilei Klaim" (Stage Wonders), a popular children's show. She released her second self-titled album in 1994.

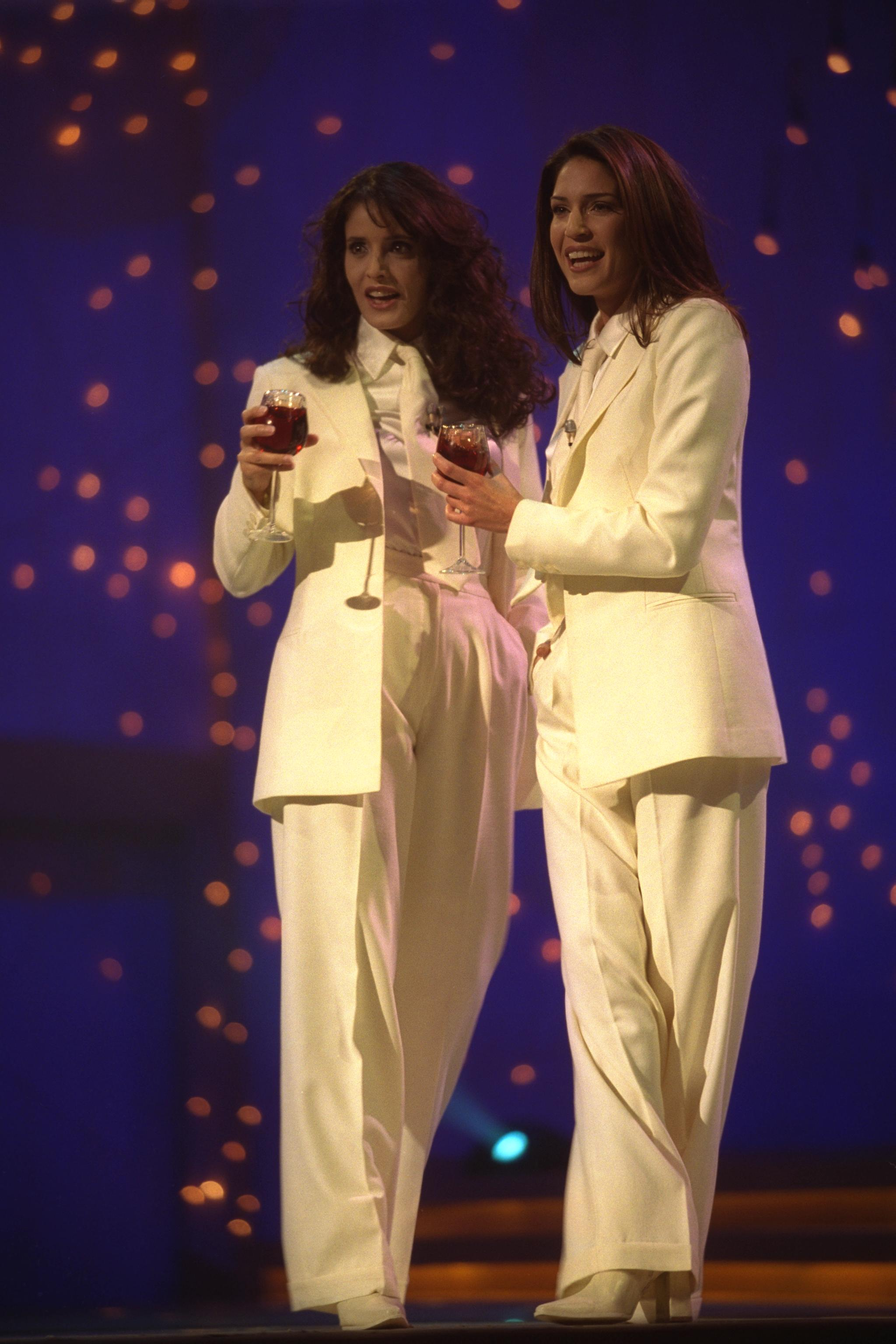
Hosting the 1999 Eurovision Contest in Jerusalem with Sigal Shachmon

She took part in the 1995 Festival, coming in third, and the 1999 Festival. Dekel also hosted the Eurovision Song Contest 1999 held in Jerusalem, along with Yigal Ravid and Sigal Shachmon. She appeared in several children's videos and then hosted "Dafna and Doo-Di-Doo," a television show for children.

In 2001, Dekel starred in the musical "Shilgiya" (Snow White) and composed the songs. Towards the end of the run, she continued to perform despite the death of her mother. She appeared in "Agadat Deshe" (A Grass Tale), a drama series that ran for two seasons.

In March 2008, Dafna Dekel released the single "Yoman yakar" (Dear Diary), the first song from her third album "Yoman" (diary). She wrote and composed most of the lyrics in collaboration with her brothers, who are also musicians.

== See also ==
- List of Eurovision Song Contest presenters

Awards and achievements
| Preceded by (United Kingdom) Ulrika Jonsson & Terry Wogan | Eurovision Song Contest presenter (with Yigal Ravid & Sigal Shachmon); 1999 | Succeeded by (Sweden) Kattis Ahlström & Anders Lundin |
| Preceded by Duo Datz with Kan | Israel in the Eurovision Song Contest; 1992 | Succeeded by Sarah'le Sharon & The Shiru Group with Shiru |
