= Robinson: Fiji =

- Season 16
- Presented by: Anders Öfvergård
- No. of days: 42
- No. of castaways: 19
- Winner: Daniel "DK" Westlund
- Runner-up: Henrik Norgren
- Location: Yasawa Islands, Fiji
- No. of episodes: 51

Release
- Original network: TV4
- Original release: 18 March – 27 May 2018

Additional information
- Filming dates: August – September 2017

Season chronology
- ← Previous; Love Edition Next → 2019

Robinson: Fiji is the sixteenth season of Expedition Robinson in Sweden, known as Survivor in some countries, and the first to air since 2015. This season started off with sixteen contestants divided into two tribes of eight who were vying for the grand prize of 500,000 SEK and was the first season to be hosted by Swedish reality host Anders Öfvergård.

The season premiered on 18 March and concluded on 27 May 2018 where Daniel "DK" Westlund won in a 7–2 vote against Henrik Norgren to be crowned the winner of Robinson.

== Finishing order ==
Contestant	Original Tribe	Cycle 4 Tribe	Swapped Tribe	Merged Tribe	Voted Out	Other Side	Finish
Henric Månsson; 45, Kristianstad	North Team				1st Voted Out; Day 6		19th
Nicklas Söderblom; 52, Saltsjö-Boo	South Team				2nd Voted Out; Day 11		18th
Jim Bengtsson; 60, Sjömarken	South Team				3rd Voted Out; Day 16		17th
Carolin Helt; 45, Jönköping	South Team	South Team			4th Voted Out; Day 21		16th
Sandra "Alexandra" Kolam; 39, Stockholm		South Team			5th Voted Out; Day 26		15th
Robert Follin; 46, Karlshamn	North Team	North Team	North Team		Medically evacuated Day 30		14th
Richard La Roche; 70, Stockholm		South Team	North Team	Robinson	Lost Challenge; Day 32	Medically evacuated Day 36	13th
Lina Ohlsson; 26, Malmö	North Team	North Team	South Team	Robinson	Lost Challenge; Day 32	Lost Duel; 1st jury member Day 36	12th
Lillemor Näzell; 39, Stockholm	North Team	North Team	North Team	Robinson	7th Voted Out; Day 36	Lost Duel; 2nd jury member Day 41	11th
Jan Bonnevier; 50, Gävle		South Team	North Team	Robinson	Lost Challenge; Day 32	Lost Duel; 3rd jury member Day 45	10th
Nicoline Artursson; 24, Stockholm	South Team	South Team	South Team	Robinson	8th Voted Out; Day 41	Lost Duel; 4th jury member Day 46	9th
Pascal Mazza Ramsby; Returned to Game	South Team	South Team	South Team		6th Voted Out; Day 31	Won Duel; Day 46	
Johan Andersson; 28, Stockholm	North Team	North Team	North Team	Robinson	9th Voted Out; 5th jury member Day 46		8th
Marie Rydne; 44, Gothenburg	North Team	North Team	North Team	Robinson	Lost Challenge; 6th jury member Day 47		7th
Victoria Heaps; 45, Stockholm	South Team	South Team	South Team	Robinson	Lost Challenge; 7th jury member Day 48		6th
Ida Lindström; 21, Skellefteå	North Team	North Team	South Team	Robinson	Lost Challenge; Removed from Jury; Day 49		5th
Pascal Mazza Ramsby; 25, Malmö	South Team	South Team	South Team	Robinson	Lost Challenge; 8th jury member Day 50		4th
Désirée Steno; 19, Stockholm	South Team	South Team	South Team	Robinson	Lost Challenge; 9th jury member Day 50		3rd
Henrik Norgren; 37, Strömstad	North Team	North Team	North Team	Robinson	Runner-Up; Day 51		2nd
Daniel "DK" Westlund; 30, Äppelbo	South Team	North Team	North Team	Robinson	Sole Survivor; Day 51		1st

== Season summary ==
One tribe (Team South) was plagued by conflict. One woman (Victoria) moved out of camp and made a camp of her own. DK was originally part of that tribe and was never involved in the conflicts. Everyone liked him. He was always positive and he was strong in challenges. The tribe was led by Pascal, an allround player that everyone also liked. He formed a romance with Nicoline. After a few votes, the tribe got rid of the sources of conflict but in a twist, DK was kidnapped and moved to Team North, and three jokers entered Team South, bringing new conflicts.

The main character of the season was Désirée, a young, short woman. She received much camera time and we often got to see the game through her point of view, likely because she always kept her sanity and because she had good relationships with every player. Just before the merge, she orchestrated a blindside on Pascal to get rid of a physical threat. However, Pascal continued the game as the first member of Gränslandet (The Borderland).

Team South came to the merge with only three of their original players. Two sides eventually formed. The biggest alliance was led by Henrik, a policeman who was the team leader of Lag Nord, known for being diplomatic and altruistic. He wanted the strongest players in the final. DK was on his side. Désirée never took sides. A few weak players tried to make a pact against the strong but one of them (Marie) flipped. She thought it immoral to let the least deserving player, Johan, remain in the game. Her decision saved DK.

Pascal won every duel in Gränslandet and made it to the final eight where knock-out challenges began. The last-place finisher was eliminated each challenge. After an unexpectedly strong challenge performance, Désirée qualified for plankan ("the plank", the traditional final challenge) alongside Henrik, DK and Pascal. Pascal fell off first and then Désirée. DK stood against Henrik at the final tribal council. The jury was skeptical about Henrik's diplomatic style. Some thought he brought it too far, avoiding conflict to the extent that his own personality never shined through. Some also disliked how controlling he was of his alliance. DK had not strategized much but had done well in challenges and everyone liked him as a person. He got 7 votes against 2.

== Voting history ==
	Original Tribe			Cycle 4 Tribe		Swapped Tribe		Merge Tribe												
► Cycle	1	2	3	4	5	6		7				8			9	10				
► Eliminated	Henric	Nicklas	Jim	Carolin	Alexandra	Robert	Pascal	Jan	Richard	Lina	Lillemor	Nicoline			Johan	Marie	Victoria	Ida	Pascal	Désirée
► Votes	7-1-1	4-3-1	5-1	6-2-1	4-1-0	No vote	4-2	No vote	No vote	No vote	7-2	Lost Duel			4-3-1	Lost Challenge	Lost Challenge	Lost Challenge	Lost Challenge	Lost Challenge
▼ Contestants	Votes																			
DK		Jim	No vote								Lillemor	Johan	Nicoline		Johan	Won	Won	Won	Won	Won
Henrik	Henric										Lillemor	Johan	Nicoline		Johan	Won	Won	Won	Won	Won
Désirée		Nicklas	Jim	Carolin	Alexandra		Pascal				Lillemor	Johan	Nicoline		Marie	Won	Won	Won	Won	Lost
Pascal		Nicklas	Jim	Carolin	Alexandra		Desiree									Won	Won	Won	Lost	
Ida	Henric						Pascal				Lillemor	Johan	Nicoline		Johan	Won	Won	Lost		
Victoria		Nicklas	Jim	Carolin	~~Jan~~		Pascal				Lillemor	Johan	DK		DK x2	Won	Lost			
Marie	Henric										Lillemor	Johan	Nicoline		Johan	Lost				
Johan	Henric										Victoria	DK	No vote	Won	DK					
Nicoline		Nicklas	Jim	Carolin	Alexandra		Desiree				Lillemor	Johan	DK	Lost						
Lillemor	Henric										Victoria									
Lina	Henric						Pascal			Eliminated										
Richard				Carolin x2	Alexandra				Eliminated											
Jan				Nicoline	Victoria			Eliminated												
Robert	Henric																			
Alexandra				Nicoline	~~Jan~~															
Carolin		Jim	Jim	Desiree																
Jim		Carolin	Carolin																	
Nicklas		Jim																		
Henric	Johan																			
Black Vote	Lina																			

Jury vote
Cycle #	10	
Day #	42	
Finalist	DK	Henrik
Vote	7-2	
Juror	Vote	
Désirée	DK	
Pascal	DK	
Victoria	DK	
Marie		Henrik
Johan	DK	
Nicoline	DK	
Jan		Henrik
Lillemor	DK	
Lina	DK	
