= Robinson 2023 =

Season of television series

- Season 22
- Presented by: Anders Lundin
- No. of days: 42
- No. of castaways: 22
- Winner: Oskar Hammarstedt
- Runners-up: Sanna Strand; Pernilla Block
- Location: Langkawi, Malaysia

Release
- Original network: TV4
- Original release: 19 March – 28 May 2023

Season chronology
- ← Previous; Malaysia Next → Philippines

Robinson 2023 is the twenty-second season of the Swedish reality television series Robinson. This season saw Anders Lundin returning as presenter for the first time since Expedition Robinson 2003. The season premiered on 19 March 2023 on TV4. The season concluded on 28 May 2023, with Oskar Hammarstedt winning the final challenge against Sanna Strand and Pernilla Block and claim the title of Robinson.

== Contestants ==
The contestants are teamed up according to age, one team with older and one team with younger contestants.

Contestant	Original Tribe	Swapped Tribe	Switched Tribe	Merged Tribe	Voted Out	The No Man's Land	The Borderlands	Finish
Salam Al Zerkani; 36, Gustavsberg	South Team				Eliminated; Day 2	Left Competition; Day 3		22nd Day 3
Marcus Edensky; Returned to Game	South Team				Eliminated; Day 4	Won Duel; Day 6		
Amanda Högvik; 27, Stockholm	South Team				Eliminated; Day 6		Left Competition; Day 8	21st Day 8
Peter Andersson; 68, Västra Frölunda	North Team				Ejected; Day 11			20th Day 11
Anna Stomsi; 44, Stockholm	North Team				2nd Voted Out; Day 10		Lost Challenge; Day 15	19th Day 15
Christina Onuora; 27, Solna	South Team				1st Voted Out; Day 6		Lost Challenge; Day 19	18th Day 19
Fabian Turkaij; 55, Gothenburg	North Team	North Team			4th Voted Out; Day 18		Lost Challenge; Day 23	17th Day 23
Zeki Demir; 46, Södertälje	North Team				Eliminated; Day 4	Eliminated; Day 6	Ejected; Day 23	16th Day 23
Dennis Boelius; Returned to Game	North Team	North Team	North Team		5th Voted Out; Day 22		Won Duel; Day 26	
Oskar Hammarstedt; Returned to Game	South Team	South Team	North Team		Eliminated; Day 23		Won Duel; Day 26	
Alva Trané; 23, Hudiksvall	South Team	South Team	North Team	Robinson	Left Competition; Day 28			15th Day 28
Elin Ambrosiani; Returned to Game	North Team				Eliminated; Day 2	Eliminated; Day 6	Won Duel; Day 30	
Dennis Johansson; 23, Åby	South Team	South Team	South Team		Lost Duel; Day 26		Lost Duel; Day 35	14th Day 35
Marcus Edensky; 36, Easter Island, Chile	South Team	South Team	South Team	Robinson	8th Voted Out; Day 34		Lost Duel; Day 36	13th Day 36
Camilla Widing; 52, Hallsberg	North Team	North Team			3rd Voted Out; Day 14		Lost Duel; Day 37	12th Day 37
Dennis Boelius; 42, Uppsala	North Team	North Team	North Team	Robinson	Lost Challenge; Day 37			11th Day 37
Erik Wahrolén; 39, Stockholm	North Team	North Team	South Team	Robinson	7th Voted Out; Day 30		Lost Duel; Day 38	10th Day 38
Amanda Eliasson; Returned to Game	South Team	North Team	South Team		Eliminated; Day 25		Won Duel; Day 38	
Caroline Persson; 24, Stockholm	South Team	South Team	North Team	Robinson	Lost Challenge; 1st Jury Member; Day 38			9th Day 38
Camilla Salén Sjögren; 58, Båstad	North Team	North Team	South Team	Robinson	Lost Duel; 2nd Jury Member; Day 38			8th Day 38
Christopher Da Silva; 24, Vänersborg	South Team	South Team	South Team	Robinson	Lost Challenge; 3rd Jury Member; Day 39			7th Day 39
Sophie Sörkvist; 27, Stockholm	South Team	South Team	North Team	Robinson	Lost Challenge; 4th Jury Member; Day 40			6th Day 40
Elin Ambrosiani; 40, Huddinge	North Team			Robinson	Lost Challenge; 5th Jury Member; Day 41			5th Day 41
Amanda Eliasson; 28, Sällsjö	South Team	North Team	South Team	Robinson	Lost Duel; Day 41			4th Day 41
Pernilla Block; 50, Fiskebäckskil	North Team	North Team	South Team	Robinson	2nd Runner-up; Day 42			3rd Day 42
Sanna Strand; 50, Gävle	North Team	South Team	North Team	Robinson	Runner-up; Day 42			2nd Day 42
Oskar Hammarstedt; 31, Kosta	South Team	South Team	North Team	Robinson	Robinson; Day 42			1st Day 42

== Challenges ==
Cycle	Air date	Challenges		Eliminated	Vote	Finish
Cycle	Air date	Reward	Immunity	Eliminated	Vote	Finish
Cycle 1	19 March 2023					1st Voted Out; Day TBD

== Voting History ==
#	Original Tribe
Cycle	1
Voted out	
Votes	
Alva	
Amanda E.	
Amanda H.	
Anna	
Camilla S.	
Camilla W.	
Caroline	
Christina	
Christopher	
Dennis B.	
Dennis J.	
Elin	
Erik	
Fabian	
Oskar	
Pernilla	
Peter	
Salam	
Sanna	
Sophie	
Zeki	
