= Ulrika Jonsson =

Swedish-British television presenter and model (born 1967)

- Born: Eva Ulrika Jonsson; 16 August 1967 (age 59); Sollentuna, Sweden
- Occupations: Actress, television presenter, journalist, novelist
- Years active: 1988–present
- Spouses: John Turnbull (m. 1990; div. 1995); Lance Gerrard-Wright (m. 2003; div. 2006); Brian Monet (m. 2008; div. 2019)
- Children: 4

Eva Ulrika Jonsson (born 16 August 1967) is a Swedish television presenter and model based in the UK. She became known as a TV-am weather presenter, and moved on to present the ITV show Gladiators, and later featured as a team captain on the BBC Two show Shooting Stars.

== Career ==
After working as a secretary, Jonsson began her television career on TV-am in 1989, as a weather presenter on Good Morning Britain. From 12 September 1989, she was also the weather presenter for Swedish TV3, broadcasting from London. In 1991, she co-presented BBC One's short-lived daytime quiz show Who's Bluffing Who? with Richard Cartridge, and starred in the French film, The Annunciation of Marie (1991).

In 1992, she moved into mainstream presenting and played host to numerous shows including ITV's Gladiators, The National Lottery Draws – plus two major international broadcasts, the Eurovision Song Contest in 1998 and Miss World in 1999. She also modelled for Playtex Lingerie during this period and was a team captain on the BBC TV quiz show Shooting Stars. On the strength of her appearances in Shooting Stars, Jonsson starred in a BBC TV special of her own in 1997. Entitled It's Ulrika!, the show featured Jonsson singing and acting in comedy sketches written specially for her by Shooting Stars hosts Vic Reeves (under his real name of Jim Moir) and Bob Mortimer, who both appeared in various supporting roles. The show was intended to act as a pilot for a possible future series, but ratings were only moderate and the show was not picked up for a series.

In 1997, Jonsson interviewed the then British Prime Minister John Major for the BBC2 programme The Enormous Election. The following year, she interviewed the then Chancellor of the Exchequer, Gordon Brown, for her programme Ulrika in Euroland.

She presented the Eurovision Song Contest in 1998 when it was hosted in Birmingham, alongside Terry Wogan; later that year she co-hosted the Royal Variety Performance alongside Ronan Keating at the Lyceum Theatre in London. Following this, she co-hosted Miss World 1999 with Melanie Sykes at the Olympia Hall in London. Jonsson was booked to host Channel 5's reality game show Jailbreak in Autumn 2000 but had to pull out of the project due to health concerns over her newborn child. She was replaced as main host by Craig Charles. Jonsson later presented BBC One game show Dog Eat Dog, broadcast from April 2001 to November 2002, and The Joy of Text in June 2001 alongside Terry Alderton.

In 2002, Jonsson presented the first series of ITV makeover show Home On Their Own, a show where children made alterations to their house (how they wanted the house to be) during the course of a weekend, while their parents went on holiday. Some of the home improvements included an Austin Powers room, individual doorbells for the children and a cinema living room. Jonsson did not return for the second series, which was hosted by Tess Daly the following year.

In 2002, she was the subject of a Channel 4 documentary, Ulrika Jonsson: the Truth About Men. The programme featured a candid interview with Jonsson, received heavy press attention and attracted 2.8 million viewers.

After intense media attention relating to events in her private life, Jonsson decided to return to Sweden. The Swedish television network TV3 offered her the role as hostess of the Miss Sweden beauty pageant. She accepted the invitation. In March 2003, Jonsson was a contestant on the BBC's Comic Relief Does Fame Academy. In 2005, she appeared with four celebrities on Channel 4's daytime show Come Dine with Me. On 20 January 2007, she joined 10 celebrities to take part in the ITV reality TV show Dancing on Ice, where she was partnered with Pavel Aubrecht. With previous skating experience in her native Sweden, Jonsson was expected to go far in the event but finished 9th after being beaten in the skate-off by Kay Burley during week 3.

On 20 March 2007, she appeared in the confessional TV show, Ulrika: Am I a Sex Addict?, broadcast on Channel 4. The show charted Jonsson's personal journey to uncover the truth about sex addiction. She has appeared on BBC One's Would I Lie to You? (2007). In March 2009, she appeared in the new ITV series Piers Morgan's Life Stories, each episode of which included a celebrity figure and a one-to-one interview with Morgan about their lives.

In April 2009, it was confirmed that Jonsson would return to Shooting Stars as team captain for a full series airing later that year. She presented the new series of BingoLotto, on Virgin 1 every Sunday night at 7 pm which started on 13 September 2009.

Her debut novel, The Importance of Being Myrtle, which focuses on relationships was published by the Penguin Group on 1 September 2011.

In 2017, she reached the final of Celebrity MasterChef.

In 2021, she took part in Channel 4's Celebrity SAS: Who Dares Wins. She was the second contestant to leave the series but on medical grounds not as the weakest participant.

On 27 October 2021, Channel 4 announced Jonsson would be taking part in the tenth series of Celebs Go Dating, alongside Abz Love, Ryan-Mark Parsons, Miles Nazaire, Chloe Brockett, Nikita Jasmine, Marty McKenna and Jessika Power. The series began airing in January 2022.

=== Big Brother ===
In January 2009, Jonsson took part in Channel 4's Celebrity Big Brother. She eventually won with 57% of the final vote during the final on 23 January. As results were announced to the contestants, Jonsson said "Oh my god, that's bonkers."

She had been nominated by housemates for eviction on each occasion, firstly by 'head of house' Terry Christian and then by other housemates, but survived the public vote on five occasions. Jonsson eventually progressed to the finals night, as the only woman left, after La Toya Jackson was evicted by public vote on Day 20. Before her entry into the house, various newspapers had reported that Jonsson had negotiated a £175,000 payment, nearly eight times as much as some of the other celebrities. Jonsson commented "It is singularly the weirdest experience of my entire life and I've had quite a weird life."

Jonsson once again entered the Big Brother house on 24 August 2010 for Ultimate Big Brother, reaching the final and finishing seventh.

== Autobiography and John Leslie scandal ==
Jonsson wrote in her autobiography that an unnamed television presenter had raped her earlier in her television career. Matthew Wright named (apparently accidentally) John Leslie as the alleged perpetrator on his television show The Wright Stuff. Jonsson made no public comment on Leslie's naming and did not cooperate with police over the matter. Police investigated Leslie but never charged him with the alleged offence.

== Personal life ==
Jonsson has been married three times and has four children. She is a Manchester United fan.

She married cameraman John Turnbull in 1990. They moved to Cookham Dean in Berkshire the following year. They have one son (born 1994). They divorced in 1995.

Jonsson subsequently dated footballer Stan Collymore. In June 1998, during the 1998 World Cup, Collymore issued a public apology after he was violent towards Jonsson during an argument in a Paris bar. Soon after the end of her relationship with Collymore, she began dating German hotel manager Marcus Kempen. They have one daughter (b. 2000). Jonsson's relationship with Kempen ended soon after the birth.

In April 2002, Jonsson confirmed reports that she had had an affair with Sven-Göran Eriksson, then-manager of England's football team, who had a long-time girlfriend. She stated that her relationship with Eriksson had recently ended. She was given the job as a columnist for the News of the World newspaper in 2003, in which she regularly commented on Eriksson's private life. Her column was dropped in 2007, a year after Eriksson resigned as England manager. It was announced in 2011 that she had taken legal proceedings against the newspaper alleging that an investigator had hacked into her mobile phone.

While presenting Mr. Right in 2002, Jonsson met Lance Gerrard-Wright, a contestant on the show. They subsequently began a relationship. They married in August 2003. They have one daughter (born 2004). They divorced in October 2006.

Jonsson married her third husband, American advertising executive Brian Monet, in March 2008. They have one son (born 2008). In April 2019, it was announced that they had divorced. She told Best magazine that they had tried to salvage their relationship with counselling but failed.

In 2019, she went on the dating show First Dates Hotel and began dating her match on the show, Paul.

In 2021, Jonsson was announced as a cast member in E4's Celebs Go Dating which began airing in January 2022.

In 2022, Jonsson stated that she had had a number of same sex experiences, "most certainly borne out of sexual desire."

== Filmography ==
Television

Year	Programme	Role
1989–1992	Good Morning Britain	Weather presenter
1992–2000	Gladiators	Presenter
1993, 1995–1997, 2002, 2008–2011	Shooting Stars	Team captain
1998	Eurovision Song Contest	Co-presenter
1998	Royal Variety Performance	Co-presenter
1999	Miss World 1999	Co-presenter
2000	Techno Games	Presenter
2001	The Joy of Text	Presenter
2001–2002	Dog Eat Dog	Presenter
2002	Home On Their Own	Presenter
2002	Miss Sweden	Presenter
2007	Dancing on Ice	Contestant; 9th place
2009	Celebrity Big Brother	Housemate; winner
2010	Ultimate Big Brother	Housemate; 7th place
2017	Celebrity MasterChef	Contestant; finalist
2019	First Dates Hotel	Contestant
2021	Celebrity SAS: Who Dares Wins	Contestant; medically withdrawn
2022	Celebs Go Dating	Contestant
2022	Mortimer & Whitehouse: Gone Fishing	Guest

Film

Year	Film	Role
1991	The Annunciation of Marie	Violaine Vercors
2004	Bob the Builder: Snowed Under	Jana von Strudel (voice)

== Bibliography ==
- Jonsson, Ulrika (2003). Honest. Pan Macmillan. ISBN 978-0-330-41174-5.

== See also ==
- List of Eurovision Song Contest presenters

Preceded by (Republic of Ireland) Carrie Crowley and Ronan Keating	Eurovision Song Contest presenter (with Terry Wogan); 1998	Succeeded by (Israel) Yigal Ravid, Dafna Dekel & Sigal Shachmon
Preceded by Shilpa Shetty	Celebrity Big Brother UK Winner; Series 6 (2009)	Succeeded by Alex Reid
