= Michael Björklund =

Finnish chef

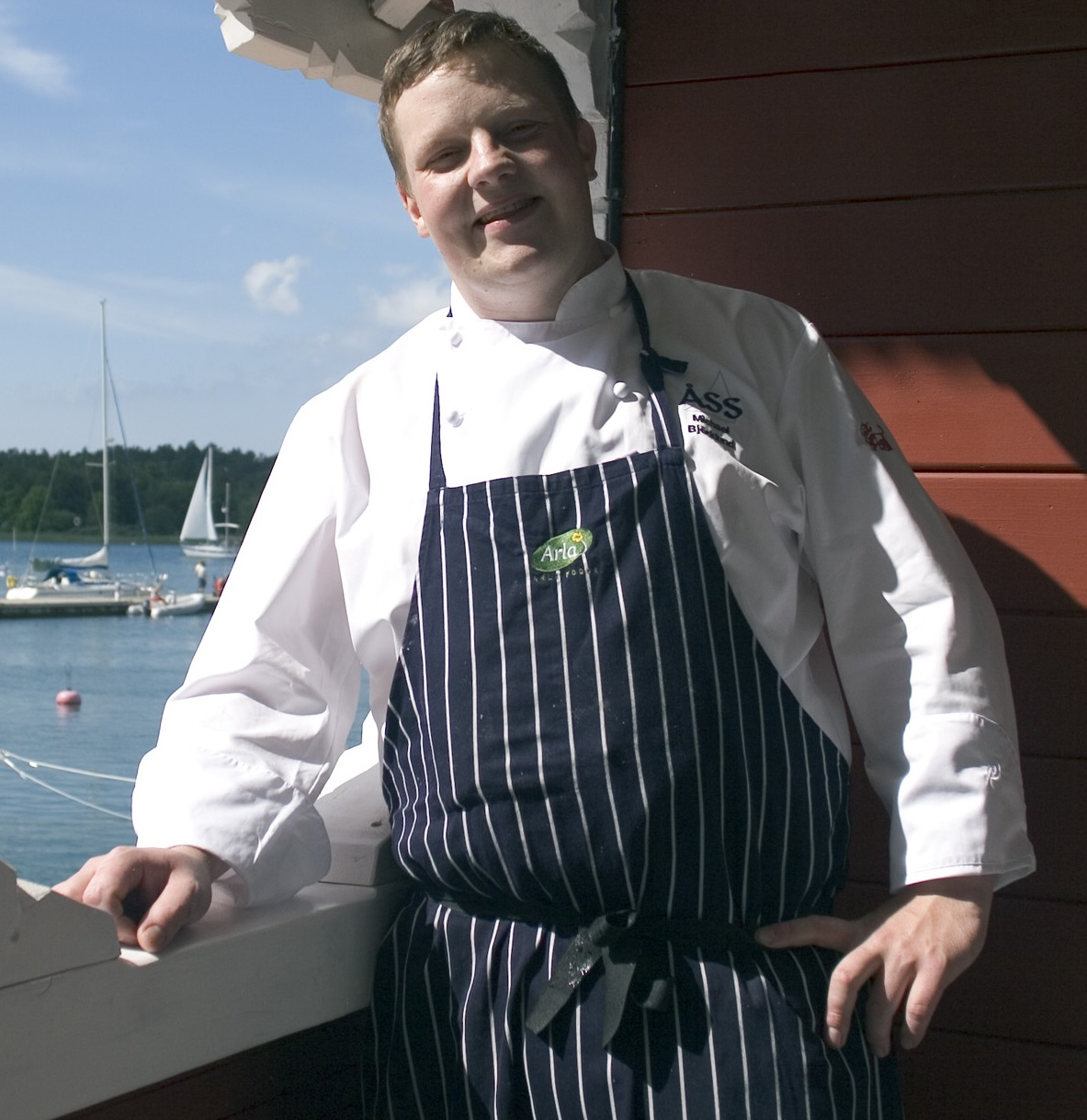
Michael Bjorklund in 2005

Michael Björklund (born 15 May 1975 in Saltvik) is an Åland-born Finnish chef, author and television personality. Björklund owns and runs the restaurang Smakbyn besides the Kastelholms Castle in Sund. He is also part-owner of Restaurant Hejm in Vaasa.

Björklund was the winner of Robinson 2020 which was broadcast on TV4. He won the prize of 500,000 (SEK) after 42 days in an island in Fiji. He has previously appeared in Swedish TV along with Rickard Sjöberg on the show Skärgårdstugg on TV4. He also appeared in the Finnish-Swedish cooking show Strömsö. And in 2014, Björklund as a professional chef was a contestant on Kockarnas kamp.

Björklund won the title of Chef of the Year in Finland in 1997, in Sweden 2000, he also placed fifth in the cooking competition Bocuse d'Or.

== Bibliography ==
- Min nordiska mat, 2011, along with Kenneth Nars, ISBN 9789526757209
- Mickes fisk, 2016, ISBN 9789526765716
- Mickes söta, 2017, ISBN 9789526765730
- Mickes vilda, 2018, ISBN 9789526765761
