= Robinson: Philippines =

Season of television series

- Season 23
- Presented by: Petra Malm
- No. of days: 42
- No. of castaways: 22
- Winner: Pelle Lilja
- Runners-up: Emilia Persson; Emilio Mio Vega
- Location: El Nido, Philippines

Release
- Original network: TV4
- Original release: 2 October – 7 December 2023

Season chronology
- ← Previous; 2023 Next → 2024

Robinson: Philippines is the twenty-third season of the Swedish reality television series Robinson. This season saw Petra Malm return as presenter after a season hiatus where 22 Swedes competed against each other to try and win the grand prize of 500,000kr. The season premiered on 2 October 2023 on TV4. The season concluded on 7 December 2023 where returning player and joker Pelle Lilja won in the final challenge against Emilio Mio Vega and fellow joker Emilia Persson to win the grand prize and the title of Robinson.

== Contestants ==
Contestant	Original Tribe	Intruders Enter	Switched Tribe	Post-Duel Tribe	2nd Switched Tribe	Merged Tribe	Voted Out	The Borderlands	Finish
Patrik Bernstorf; 52, Tyresö								Lost Duel; Day 7	22nd Day 7
Deisi da Silva Rudén; 45, Eskilstuna	South Team						Lost Challenge; Day 3	Lost Duel; Day 11	21st Day 11
Sacarias Kiusalaas; 33, Stockholm	South Team	South Team	South Team				Medically Evacuated; Day 12		20th Day 12
Peder Karlsson; 48, Täby	South Team	South Team					2nd Voted Out; Day 10	Lost Duel; Day 15	19th Day 15
Emilia Persson; Entered Game								Won Duel; Day 18	
Daniela Maniscalchi; Returned to Game	North Team	North Team					1st Voted Out; Day 6	Won Duel; Day 18	
Therese Tang; Returned to Game	North Team	North Team	South Team				3rd Voted Out; Day 14	Won Duel; Day 18	
Pelle Lilja; Entered Game								Won Duel; Day 18	
Therese Tang; 41, Kalmar	North Team	North Team	South Team	North Team			Left Competition; Day 21		18th Day 21
Pernilla Hägglund; 30, Mariehamn, Åland		North Team	North Team				Lost Duel; Day 18	Lost Duel; Day 23	17th Day 23
Charlie Wiberg; 33, Aneby	South Team	South Team	South Team	South Team	North Team		Ejected; Day 27		16th Day 27
Karolina Tilander; Returned to Game	North Team	North Team	North Team	North Team	South Team		5th Voted Out; Day 26	Returned; Day 27 (Note: Due to Charlie's ejection from the game, Karolina as the recent eliminated player, returned in his place.)	
Johan Gärtner; 34, Mölndal		North Team	North Team	North Team	South Team	Robinson	Left Competition; Day 27		15th Day 27
Magnus Kannerbro; Returned to Game	North Team	North Team	North Team				Lost Duel; Day 18	Won Duel; Day 31	
Franz Mateo; Returned to Game	North Team	North Team	North Team				Lost Duel; Day 18	Won Duel; Day 31	
Maria Viscovi Falk; 37, Gothenburg	South Team	South Team	North Team	North Team			4th Voted Out; Day 22	Lost Duel; Day 34	14th Day 34
Ken Gacamugani; 30, Enköping	North Team	North Team	North Team	North Team	South Team	Robinson	Lost Challenge; Day 30	Lost Duel; Day 34	13th Day 34
Els-Marie Embuske; 45, Stockholm	North Team	North Team	North Team	North Team	North Team	Robinson	6th Voted Out; Day 30	Lost Duel; Day 34	12th Day 34
Sara Mölldal; Returned to Game		South Team	South Team				Lost Duel; Day 18	Won Duel; Day 34	
Daniela Maniscalchi; 39, Gothenburg	North Team	North Team		North Team	North Team	Robinson	Lost Challenge; Day 34		11th Day 34
Tove Dalsryd; 29, Stockholm	South Team	South Team	South Team	South Team	North Team	Robinson	7th Voted Out; Day 34		10th Day 34
Wilmer Tuoremaa; 22, Kiruna	North Team	North Team	North Team	North Team	South Team	Robinson	Lost Challenge; 1st Jury Member; Day 38		9th Day 38
Karolina Tilander; 22, Södertälje	North Team	North Team	North Team	North Team	South Team	Robinson	Lost Duel; 2nd Jury Member; Day 38		8th Day 38
Sara Mölldal; 27, Stockholm		South Team	South Team			Robinson	Lost Challenge; 3rd Jury Member; Day 39		7th Day 39
Ylwa Lidén; 66, Sorsele	South Team	South Team	South Team	South Team	North Team	Robinson	Lost Challenge; 4th Jury Member; Day 40		6th Day 40
Magnus Kannerbro; 53, Gothenburg	North Team	North Team	North Team			Robinson	Lost Challenge; 5th Jury Member; Day 41		5th Day 41
Franz Mateo; 42, Lund	North Team	North Team	North Team			Robinson	Lost Duel; Day 41		4th Day 41
Emilia Persson; 22, Gävle				North Team	South Team	Robinson	2nd Runner-up; Day 42		3rd Day 42
Emilio Mio Vega; 30, Marbella, Spain/Stockholm	South Team	South Team	South Team	South Team	South Team	Robinson	Runner-up; Day 42		2nd Day 42
Pelle Lilja; 59, Enskedefältet; Malaysia				South Team	North Team	Robinson	Robinson; Day 42		1st Day 42

== Challenges ==
Episodes	Air dates	Challenges		Eliminated	Vote	Finish
Episodes	Air dates	Reward	Immunity	Eliminated	Vote	Finish
Cycle 1 (1-5)	2-5 October 2023	North Team	South Team	Deisi	0	Lost Challenge; Day 3
Cycle 1 (1-5)	2-5 October 2023	North Team	South Team	Daniela	5-5; 6-2	1st Voted Out; Day 6
Cycle 2 (6-10)	9-12 October 2023	North Team	North Team	Peder	5-2-1	2nd Voted Out; Day 10
Cycle 3 (11-15)	16-19 October 2023	South Team	North Team	Sacarias	0	Medically Evacuated; Day 12
Cycle 3 (11-15)	16-19 October 2023	South Team	North Team	Therese	6-1	3rd Voted Out; Day 14
Cycle 4 (16-20)	23-26 October 2023	South Team	South Team	Pernilla	0	Lost Duel; Day 18
Cycle 4 (16-20)	23-26 October 2023	South Team	South Team	Magnus	0	Lost Duel; Day 18
Cycle 4 (16-20)	23-26 October 2023	South Team	South Team	Franz	0	Lost Duel; Day 18
Cycle 4 (16-20)	23-26 October 2023	South Team	South Team	Sara	0	Lost Duel; Day 18
Cycle 5 (21-25)	31 October-2 November 2023	North Team				4th Voted Out; Day 22

== Voting History ==
Robinson: Philippines voting history
	Original Tribes						Switched Tribes
Cycle	1				2		3
Episode	2	5			10		15
Day	3	6		7	10	11	14
Team	South	North		None	South	None	
Eliminated	Deisi	Tie	Daniela	Patrik	Peder	Deisi	TBD
Vote	Challenge	5-5	6-2	Challenge	5-2-1	Challenge	
Voter	Challenge	Vote		Challenge	Vote	Challenge	Vote
Charlie					Emilio		
Els-Marie	Won	Magnus	Daniela				
Emilio					Peder		
Franz		Daniela	Daniela				
Johan		Daniela	Daniela				
Karolina		Magnus	Magnus				
Ken	Won	Magnus	Daniela				
Magnus		Daniela	None				
Maria					Peder		
Pernilla		Daniela	Daniela				
Sacarias	Won				Charlie		
Sara					Peder		
Therese	Won	Daniela	Daniela				
Tove					Peder		
Wilmer		Magnus	Magnus				
Ylwa	Won				Peder		
Peder					Emilio	Borderlands	
Daniela		Magnus	None	Borderlands			
Emilia	Borderlands			Won	Borderlands	Won	Borderlands
Pelle	Borderlands			Won	Borderlands	Won	Borderlands
Deisi	Lost	Borderlands		Won	Borderlands	Lost	
Patrik	Borderlands			Lost			
