= Anders Lundin =

Swedish television host, comedian and lyricist

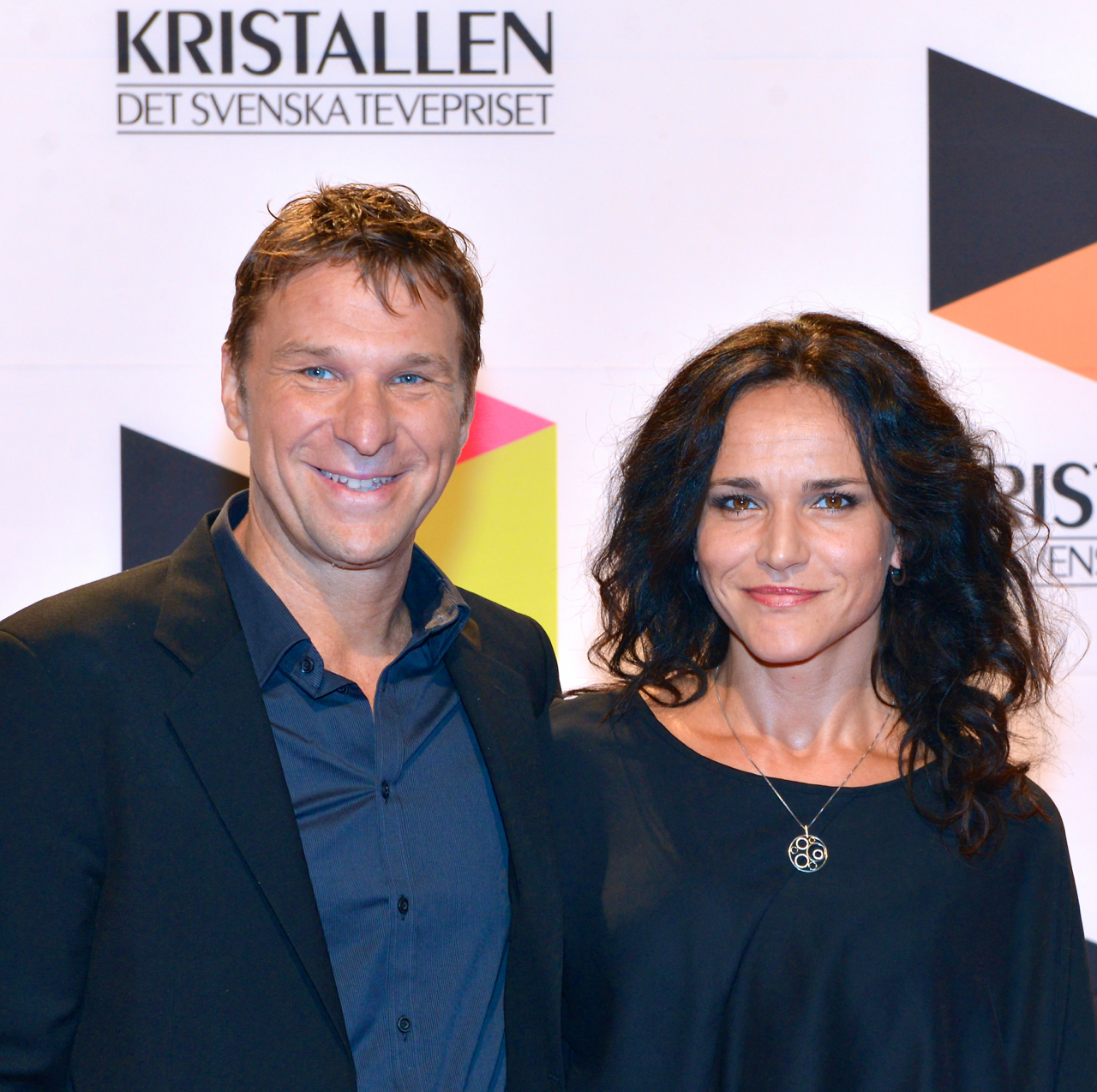
- Lundin with his wife Kerstin (2013)
- Born: Anders Erik Lundin; 8 September 1958 (age 67); Stockholm, Sweden
- Occupation: Television presenter
- Website: www.anderslundin.se

Anders Erik Lundin (born 8 September 1958) is a Swedish television host, comedian and lyricist. Lundin was one of the first hosts in the world to host the show Expedition Robinson.

Lundin co-hosted the Eurovision Song Contest 2000 along with Kattis Ahlström and, 2003–10, was every summer host for the successful song show Allsång på Skansen. He has also hosted the show Allt för Sverige which takes Americans to Sweden to learn more about their Swedish ancestry.

== See also ==
- List of Eurovision Song Contest presenters

Preceded by (Israel) Yigal Ravid, Dafna Dekel & Sigal Shachmon	Eurovision Song Contest presenter (with Kattis Ahlström); 2000	Succeeded by (Denmark) Natasja Crone Back & Søren Pilmark
