= Anders Öfvergård =

Swedish television presenter, civil engineer and entrepreneur

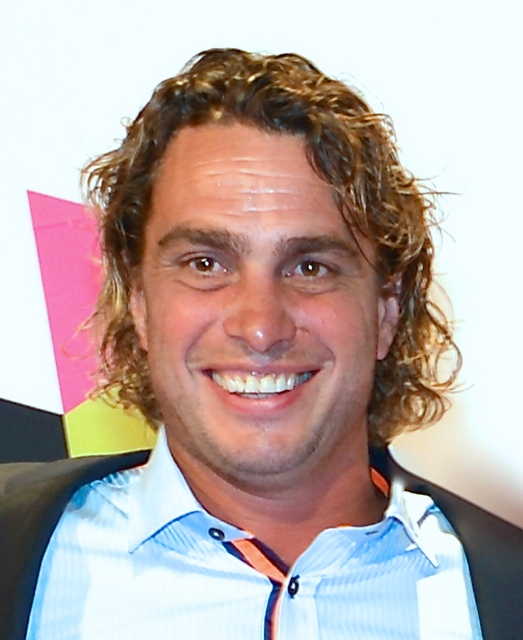
- Öfvergård at the Kristallen award show in 2013.
- Born: Sven Anders Öfvergård; 3 January 1968; Danderyd Municipality
- Occupations: Television presenter; engineer; entrepreneur
- Known for: Arga Snickaren

Sven Anders Öfvergård (born 3 January 1968), also known as Arga Snickaren (lit. 'the Angry Carpenter'), is a Swedish television personality. He owns and runs the engineer business A. Öfvergårds snickeri & bygg AB. He is best known for presenting the home improvement television show Arga snickaren on Kanal 5. He has also owned four restaurants and bars, and worked for Lowe Brindfors. In 2014, he presented Arga restaurangen broadcast on Kanal 5, in the show he attempted to start a pop up restaurant with only inexperienced staff.

Öfvergård participated as a celebrity dancer on the TV4 show Let's Dance 2017. He also presented the current affairs television series Fuskbyggarna on TV4 from 2017 to 2019.

From 2018, Öfvergård presented Expedition Robinson on TV4. In September 2021, TV4 announced that Öfvergård had been fired due to a scandal involving alcohol and a scuffle with a co-worker during a staff party in the Dominican Republic after filming of Robinson had wrapped.

In late June 2023, Öfvergård was apprehended by police, suspected of petty theft from an ICA Maxi grocery store in Värmdö, Stockholm. He reportedly attempted to leave the store with 3 unpaid packs of meat worth 400 SEK. He later stated he had no intention of stealing and claimed he merely forgot to scan some goods, but according to the store staff he supposedly "stole regularly." In August 2023 he was convicted of petty theft and imposed 40 day-fines of 1,000 SEK, totalling 40,000. Additionally, he was made to pay 1,000 SEK to the crime victim compensation fund.

== Publications ==
- Öfvergård, Anders & Marmgren, Michaéla (2015). Bygga, fixa, bo : enkla projekt som gör hela skillnaden [Build, fix, live : simple projects that make all the difference] (in Swedish). Stockholm: Norstedts. ISBN 978-91-1-305472-8.
