= Robinson: Revanschen =

- Season 14
- Presented by: Paolo Roberto
- No. of days: 35
- No. of castaways: 14
- Winner: Mariana "Mirre" Hammarling
- Runner-up: Robert "Robban" Andersson
- Location: El Nido, Palawan, Philippines
- No. of episodes: 12

Release
- Original network: TV4
- Original release: 20 August – 6 September 2012

Additional information
- Filming dates: April – May 2012

Season chronology
- ← Previous; 2011 Next → Love Edition

Robinson: Revanschen (English: Robinson: The Revenge) is the fourteenth season of the Swedish version of Survivor and was the last season to air on the Swedish television channel TV4. Paolo Roberto returned to host this season, which featured former contestants from previous seasons returning for another chance to win the game.

== Contestants ==
Contestant				Tribe			Finish		Total Votes	Note
Name	Age	From	Previous	Original	Switched	Merged	Day	Reason	Total Votes	Note
Christian Ternstedt	31	Växjö	2009 - 9th	Guntao	—N/a	—N/a	6	1st Voted Out	3	
Sophie Uppvik	40	Stockholm	1998 – 3rd	Tigas	—N/a	—N/a	9	Lost Duel	0	
Hjalmtyr Daregård	22	Stockholm	2011 – 9th	The Other Side	—N/a	—N/a	11	2nd Voted Out	3	
Deniz Özen	41	Stockholm	1999 – 16th	Tigas	Guntao	—N/a	17	3rd Voted Out	4	
Michel "Micha" Berendji	43	Stockholm	2009 – 17th	The Other Side	Tigas	—N/a	20	Lost Duel	0	
Johnny Leinonen	45	Motala	1999 – 13th, 2004 – 10th	Guntao	Tigas	—N/a	23	4th Voted Out	5	
Beatrice Karlsson	41	Arvidsjaur	2009 – 16th	The Other Side	Guntao	Robinson	25	Lost Challenge	4	1st Jury Member
Leif Svensson	40	Lindesberg	2002 – 5th, 2003 – 20th	Guntao	Guntao	Robinson	26	Ejected	0	
Mia Laaksonen	33	Gothenburg	1998 – 12th, 2003 – 17th	Guntao	Guntao	Robinson	29	Lost Duel	2	2nd Jury Member
Sanna Benjaminsson	42	Skara	Caribbean – 3rd	Tigas	Tigas	Robinson	31	5th Voted Out	3	
Susanne Rittedal Söderblom	41	Gothenburg	1998 – 10th	Tigas	Tigas	Robinson	34	Lost Challenge	1	3rd Jury Member
Anna Lundh	24	Mora	2009 – 3rd	Guntao	Guntao	Robinson	34	Lost Challenge	0	
Robert "Robban" Andersson	37	Stockholm	1999 – 3rd, 2003 – 13th, 2005 – 11th	Tigas	Tigas	Robinson	35	Runner-Up	0	
Mariana "Mirre" Hammarling	44	Saltsjö-Boo	2002 – 2nd, 2003 – 10th	The Other Side	Tigas	Robinson	35	Sole Survivor	2	

The Total Votes is the number of votes a castaway has received during Tribal Councils where the castaway is eligible to be voted out of the game. It does not include the votes received during the final Tribal Council.

== Cameos ==
Veteran				Tribe	Role
Name	Age	From	Previous	Tribe	Role
Martin Melin	45	Stockholm	1997 – 1st	Tigas	Tribe Coach
Mats Kemi	53	Huddinge	2011 – 1st	Guntao	Tribe Coach
Zübeyde Simsek	43	Stockholm	2001 – 4th, 2003 - 14th	Robinson	Challenge Assistant

== The game ==
#	Episode Quote	Air Date	Challenges		Eliminated	Vote	Finish
1	No quote in this episode.	20 August 2012	Anna	Leif	No Tribal Council occurred in this episode.		
2	"Han är ju en bulldozer men han börja stånga mig som en tjur."	21 August 2012	Johnny	Tigas	Christian	3–2	1st Voted Out; Day 6
3	"En flygande kråka hittar mer än en sittande kråka."	22 August 2012	Mia, Deniz, Robban, Anna, Susanne, Leif, Johnny	Sanna	Sophie	No vote	Lost Duel; Day 9
4	"Att det finns korkade människor i laget kan ju liksom inte jag ta ansvar för..."	23 August 2012	Guntao		Hjalmtyr	3–2	2nd Voted Out; Day 11
4	"Att det finns korkade människor i laget kan ju liksom inte jag ta ansvar för..."	23 August 2012	Tigas		Hjalmtyr	3–2	2nd Voted Out; Day 11
5	"Jag menar tänk er själva... det var så här oäu oäu oäu..."	27 August 2012	Tigas	Martin	No Tribal Council occurred in this episode.		
6		28 August 2012	Leif	Tigas	Martin	4–2	Quit; Day 20
6		28 August 2012	Leif	Tigas	Mats	4–2	Quit; Day 20
6		28 August 2012	Leif	Tigas	Deniz	4–2	3rd Voted Out; Day 17
7		29 August 2012	Tigas	No Tribal Council occurred in this episode.			
8		30 August 2012	Leif	Guntao	Micha	5–1	Lost Duel; Day 20
8		30 August 2012	Leif	Guntao	Johnny	5–1	4th Voted Out; Day 23

In the case of multiple tribes or castaways who wins the challenge, they are listed in order of finish, or alphabetically where it was a team effort; where one castaway won and invited others, the invitees are in brackets.

=== Episode Quotes ===
Translation of the original Swedish episode quotes and who that said it is listed here:

1. No episode quote during the first episode.
2. "He is a bulldozer but he started to gore me like a bull." – Robert "Robban" Andersson
3. "A flying crow finds more than a sitting crow." – Leif Svensson
4. "That there are stupid people in the team is something that I can't take responsibility for..." – Johnny Leinonen
5. "I mean, imagine yourselves... It was like this bleh bleh bleh..." – Deniz Özen

=== Challenges ===
==== Episode 1 ====
- Individual Immunity Challenge: Nine of the twelve castaways (not Leif, Mirre and Robban) competed in an endurance challenge. They had to stand on footholds and support their hands inside a wooden frame above the water. The last person standing would win individual immunity for the first Tribal Council.

After about an hour, Anna won against runner-up Susanne and received immunity. Hjalmtyr, who fell into the water first, were sent to 'The Other Side'.

- Teamleader Challenge: The other three castaways competed in a challenge, where they had to smash open ten crates with a sledgehammer. Inside the crates were rings that they would put one at a time at the top of a climbing frame. The first person who would get their five rings placed at the top would win the challenge.

After a close battle, Leif won just barely before Robban. Mirre, who came in last, got sent to 'The Other Side'. Leif and Robban got to split the remaining castaways between themselves into two tribes, Guntao and Tigas.

==== Episode 2 ====
- Duel Challenge: Johnny (chosen from Guntao) and Sophie (chosen from Tigas) competed in a duel. They had to place their hands on each plate on a table. When the candle on it goes out, the first person who touches the middle plate on the table wins.

In the end, Johnny's hand were on the plate first and won. He then had to choose between three rewards (mosquito nets, crab traps or fishing equipment); The better reward - the worse punishment for the opposing team.

- Immunity Challenge: Guntao and Tigas competed as teams in this challenge, where one from each tribe will hold on to a pole while two opposing tribemates will have to drag away him/her from the pole and over the finish line. The first team who wins two matches wins the challenge.

Tigas won against Guntao with 2-1, and therefore Guntao were sent to Tribal Council that same night.

==== Episode 3 ====
- Individual Challenge: Guntao and Tigas competed as individuals in this challenge. They had to dig up weights inside an enclosure, and place those weights one at a time on seven ports. When four or five weights have been placed on a specific port, the last person who placed the last weight can escape through it. The two contestants who are remaining when all seven ports have been opened will lose the challenge.

Sanna and Sophie became the two remaining inside the enclosure and had to face each other in a duel the following day.

- Duel Challenge: Sanna and Sophie competed in a duel, where they had to stand on their toes while pressing a cube with their heads against a leaking bucket of paint. The person who would stand the longest would win the challenge.

Afterwards, it was Sophie who stepped down first, despite Sanna already had emptied her bucket. Therefore, Sophie was eliminated from the game.

==== Episode 4 ====
- Immunity Challenge: Guntao and Tigas sent two people each, in which they had to choose the best of those four to compete against two of the Other Side team. In this challenge, they had to push against a log to drive out the opponents. Best out of three would win this challenge.

In the end, Leif (from Guntao) and Susanne (from Tigas) won against Beatrice and Micha from the Other Side, and therefore sent the Other Side to Tribal Council.

==== Episode 5 ====
- Reward Challenge: Guntao and Tigas competed as teams in this challenge, where before they started; the two individuals voted the weakest links in each team (Johnny and Deniz) switched teams. Then the teams had to paddle their canoe along the river to pontons. The first team who get all their tribemates on it wins the challenge.

Tigas won (together with Johnny), as they also got two contestants from the Other Side as their reward. They chose Micha and Mirre, which meant Beatrice became a member of Guntao.

- Teamleader Challenge: Martin and Mats competed in an arm wrestling challenge. Best out of three matches would win the challenge.

In the end, it was Martin who won 2-0 and got to join the winning tribe of Tigas, while Mats joined Guntao.

== Voting history ==
	Original Tribes			Switched Tribes			Merged Tribe							
Episode #:	2	3	4	6	8		9	10	11		12			
Eliminated:	Christian; 3/5 votes	Sophie; No vote	Hjalmtyr; 3/5 votes^{1}	Deniz; 4/6 votes	Micha; No vote	Johnny; 5/6 votes^{2}	Beatrice; No vote	Leif; No vote	Mia; No vote	Sanna; 3/5 votes	Susanne; Anna; No vote		Robban; 0/3 votes^{3}	Mirre; 3/3 votes^{3}
Voter	Vote													
Mirre			Hjalmtyr; Hjalmtyr			Johnny			Won	Sanna	Won		Jury Vote	
Robban						Johnny; Johnny				Sanna		Won	Jury Vote	
Anna	Christian			Deniz						Mirre		Lost		
Susanne						Johnny				Sanna		Lost		Mirre
Sanna		Won				Johnny				Mirre				
Mia	Christian			Beatrice					Lost					Mirre
Leif	Christian			Deniz	Won									
Beatrice			Hjalmtyr	Deniz										Mirre
Johnny	Mia					Susanne								
Micha			Beatrice		Lost									
Deniz				Beatrice										
Hjalmtyr			Beatrice											
Sophie		Lost												
Christian	Mia													
Martin														
Mats				Deniz										

^1 At the second tribal council Mirre was given two votes to cast as tribe leader.

^2 At the fourth tribal council Robban was given two votes to cast as tribe leader.

^3 When it came time for the winner to be decided both Mirre and Robban were placed on crucifixes that were each held by a set of three ropes. The two were told that they would alternate picking a member of the jury (Anna, Susanne, Sanna, Mia, and Beatrice) who in turn would cut the rope of the player they didn't want to win. Mirre won the right to choose first and picked Beatrice, Mia was then chosen by Robban, and Susanne was picked third by Mirre. As all three women cut one of Robban's ropes Mirre won the competition thus Anna and Sanna did not need to vote.
