= Robinson (TV series) =

Swedish reality television series

- Genre: Reality competition
- Created by: Charlie Parsons
- Developed by: Planet 24
- Theme music composer: Jon Rekdal
- Country of origin: Sweden
- Original language: Swedish
- No. of seasons: 29

Production
- Running time: 60 minutes (1997–2005, 2012, 2018–); 85 minutes (2009–2011); 30 minutes (2018–)
- Production companies: Strix Television (1997–2005); Silverback/ITV Studios & Castaway (2009–2012); Mastiff (2015)

Original release
- Network: SVT (1997–2003); TV3 (2004–2005); TV4 (2009–2012, 2018–present); Sjuan (2015)
- Release: 13 September 1997 – present

Related
- Survivor

Robinson, formerly Expedition Robinson, is a Swedish reality game show and the original version of the international Survivor format.

The television show places a group of strangers in an isolated location, where they must provide food, fire, and shelter for themselves. They are initially divided into two tribes. The contestants compete in challenges for rewards and immunity from elimination. The remaining contestants are eventually merged into a single tribe. The contestants are progressively eliminated from the game as they are voted out by their fellow contestants or, as may be the result after the merge, lose an immunity challenge until only one remains and is awarded the grand prize.

The format was developed in 1994 by Charlie Parsons for a United Kingdom TV production company called Planet 24, but the Swedish debut in 1997 was the first production to actually make it to television. The show was a success, and plans for international versions were made. An American version called Survivor started in 2000.

== Format ==
The name alludes to both Robinson Crusoe and The Swiss Family Robinson, two stories featuring people marooned by shipwrecks.

Twelve to 20 contestants are put into a survival situation and compete in a variety of physical challenges. Early in each season two teams compete but later on the teams are merged and the competitions become individual. Contestants are eliminated through tribal councils and, after merging, losing immunity challenges until the final challenge where the winner wins the competition.

== Ownership ==
Planet 24 was owned by Charlie Parsons and Bob Geldof. Their company Castaway Television Productions retained the rights to the concept when they sold Planet 24 in 1999. In July 2017, Banijay Group acquired Castaway Television Productions.

== Seasons ==
List of Expedition Robinson seasons
Year	Location	Days	Castaways	Original tribes	Winner	Runner(s)-up	Final vote	Prize	Host	Producer(s)
1997	Babi Tengah, Malaysia	47	16	Two tribes of eight	Martin Melin	Kent Larsen	6-2	500,000 SEK ($70,000)	Harald Treutiger	Anders Eriksson
1998	Pulau Mataking and Pulau Pompom, Malaysia	47	15	Two tribes of seven, and a "joker" entering at tribe merge	Alexandra Zazzi	Birgitta Åberg	7–2	500,000 SEK ($70,000)	Harald Treutiger	Mikael Hylin
1999	Cadlao, Philippines	47	17	Four tribes of four, and a "joker" entering at tribe merge	Jerker Dalman	Klas Granström	5–4	500,000 SEK ($70,000)	Anders Lundin	Mattias Olsson
2000	Pulau Mensirip, Malaysia	47	16	Two tribes of eight and a "joker" entering at tribe merge	Mattias Dalerstedt	Edward Lundberg	7–2	500,000 SEK ($70,000)	Anders Lundin	Hasse Aro
2001	Pulau Besar, Malaysia	47	17	Two tribes of eight	Jan Emanuel Johansson	Jan Dinkelspiel	7–2	500,000 SEK ($70,000)	Anders Lundin	Hasse Aro; Kajsa Glansén
2002	Pulau Besar, Malaysia	47	17	Two tribes of eight	Antoni Matacz	Mariana "Mirre" Dehlin	5–4	500,000 SEK ($70,000)	Anders Lundin	Hasse Aro; Joakim Jankert
2003	Babi Tengah and Pulau Besar, Malaysia	47	24	Fourteen returning and ten new contestants	Emma Andersson	Mille Lansburgh	11–5	500,000 SEK ($70,000)	Anders Lundin	Hasse Aro; Anki Lindberg
2004	Sribuat, Malaysia	66	20	Two tribes of seven, a joker and five wildcard contestants	Jerry Forsberg	Fike Najafi	11–9	1,000,000 SEK ($140,000)	Robert Aschberg	Hasse Aro; Claes Leinstedt
2005	Malaysia	14	15	VIP; Three tribes of five celebrities from Denmark, Norway and Sweden	Tilde Fröling	Jan Simonsen; Asbjørn Riis	5–4–3	500,000 SEK ($70,000)	Robert Aschberg	Hasse Aro; Frida Åberg
2005	Besar Island, Malaysia	47	24	Two tribes of twelve, including one returning contestant	Karolina Conrad	Max Stjernfelt	6–5	1,000,000 SEK ($140,000)	Robert Aschberg	Hasse Aro; Frida Åberg
2009	El Nido, Palawan, Philippines	38	18	Two tribes of eight, two contestants eliminated without a tribe	Ellenor Pierre	Jarmo Heinonen	4–3		Linda Isacsson	Cricko Akander
2009–2010	Samaná Province, Dominican Republic	43	18	Two tribes of nine	Hans Brettschneider	Jimmy Führ	5–3		Paolo Roberto	Pontus Gårdinger; Ylva Hultén
2010	Caramoan Peninsula, Philippines	42	21	Two tribes of nine and three "jokers"	Erik Svedberg	Heléne Ekelund	—N/a		Paolo Roberto	Nicklas Nordernström; Ylva Hultén
2011	El Nido, Palawan, Philippines	36	20	Two tribes of ten	Mats Kemi	Ola Ahlgren; Hanna Nygren	—N/a		Paolo Roberto	Cricko Akander; Ylva Hultén
2012	El Nido, Palawan, Philippines	35	14	Fourteen returning contestants	Mariana "Mirre" Hammarling	Robert "Robban" Andersson	3–0		Paolo Roberto	Stefan Stridh
2015	Koh Rong, Cambodia	35	27	Love Edition; Twenty-seven single contestants between the ages of 20 and 42 paired together	Jennifer Egelryd; Dan Spinelli Scala	Denice Andrée; Pontus Hermansson	8–3		Linda Isacsson	Mia Berg
2018	Yasawa Islands, Fiji	51	19	Two tribes of eight and three wildcard contestants	Daniel "DK" Westlund	Henrik Norgren	7–2	500,000 SEK ($70,000)	Anders Öfvergård	Jacob Juhl
2019	Kadavu Group, Fiji	42	22	Two tribes of ten and two contestants (one returnee) on a separate beach	Klas Beyer	Fia Grönborg	—N/a (Note: Instead of a jury, there was a final challenge to determine the winner.)	500,000 SEK ($70,000)	Anders Öfvergård	Jacob Juhl
2020	Kadavu Group, Fiji	42	23	Two tribes of ten and three wildcard contestants	Michael Björklund	Clara Henry; Priya Svang	—N/a	500,000 SEK ($70,000)	Anders Öfvergård	Caroline Claesson
2021	Norrbotten, Sweden	42	20	Two tribes of six and eight wildcards	Dennis Johansson	Annki Nilsson; Joanna Swica	—N/a	500,000 SEK ($70,000)	Anders Öfvergård	Caroline Claesson
Spring 2022	Dominican Republic	42	25	Two tribes of six, five returning players on a separate beach and eight wildcards	Filip Johansson	Jessica Jonasson	—N/a	500,000 SEK ($70,000)	Anders Öfvergård	Claes Leinstedt
Fall 2022	Malaysia	42	21	Two contestants divide others into two tribes of eight, eliminating two others. The two others are sent to 'The Borderlands' facing off against three former players	Lars-Olov Johansson	Martin Larsson; Kristofer Nystedt	—N/a	500,000 SEK ($70,000)	Petra Malm	Claes Leinstedt
2023	Langkawi, Malaysia	42	22	One tribe of ten and one tribe of eleven split by 'old' and young'. One young contestant joined tribe days later after being exiled.	Oskar Hammerstedt	Sanna Strand; Pernilla Block	—N/a	500,000 SEK ($70,000)	Anders Lundin	Claes Leinstedt
2023	El Nido, Philippines	42	22	Two tribes of eight with three jokers starting on The Borderlands including one returning player. Three contestants join the two tribes days later.	Pelle Lilja	Emilio Mio Vega; Emilia Persson	—N/a	500,000 SEK ($70,000)	Petra Malm	Claes Leinstedt
2024	Caramoan, Philippines	42	22	Two tribes of ten divided by gender with two returning players starting on The Borderlands.	Olivia Lindegren	Maureen Asic; Simone Sjöström	—N/a	500,000 SEK ($70,000)	Anders Lundin	Claes Leinstedt
2024	El Nido, Philippines	42	23	Three tribes of seven with losing tribe at opening challenge being sent to The Boderlands. One returning player joins after the first tribal council. Another returning player joins The Boderlands before the second tribal council.	Ida Jensen Krogstad	Nabaz Baki; Amanda Blomå	—N/a	500,000 SEK ($70,000)	Petra Malm	Claes Leinstedt
2025	Caramoan, Philippines	42	27	Two tribes of ten. Three returning players start on The Boderlands. Four more returning players enter The Boderlands after a series of quits and evacuations.	Aron Sjölund	Sara Mölldal; Pontus Croneld	—N/a	500,000 SEK ($70,000)	Anna Brolin & Anders Lundin	Claes Leinstedt
2025	El Nido, Philippines	42	23	Three tribes of seven with tribes picked by a team captain. The losing tribe at the opening challenge are sent to The Borderlands. Two contestants later enter as "jokers".	Johan Ekström	Matteo Pasero; Samuel "Nutti" Stenman	—N/a	500,000 SEK ($70,000)	Martin Järborg	Claes Leinstedt
2026	Caramoan, Philippines	43	22	Four tribes of five divided into regions of residence in Sweden. Two contestants later enter as "jokers".	Sonja Fredriksdotter Rudqvist	Iki Gonzalez Magnusson; Caroline Järgren	—N/a	500,000 SEK ($70,000)	Anders Lundin & Martin Järborg	Claes Leinstedt
2026	Panama	TBD					—N/a	500,000 SEK ($70,000)	Martin Järborg	Claes Leinstedt
