= Robinson: Love Edition =

- Season 15
- Presented by: Linda Lindorff
- No. of castaways: 27
- Winners: Dan Spinelli Scala; Jennifer Egelryd
- Runners-up: Pontus Hermansson; Denice Andrée
- Location: Koh Rong, Cambodia
- No. of episodes: 30

Release
- Original network: Sjuan
- Original release: 7 April – 11 June 2015

Additional information
- Filming dates: November 2014 – December 2014

Season chronology
- ← Previous; Robinson: Revanschen Next → Robinson: Fiji

Robinson: Love Edition is the fifthteenth season of Expedition Robinson, the Swedish version of Survivor, and the first to air on Sjuan. Linda Lindorff, the host of Robinson 2009, returned to host this season. Fitting with the season's theme, all contestants were single people between the ages of 20 and 42, the tribes were initially divided by gender, and a pair composed of one man and one woman won the season.

== Format ==
The season featured several changes to the game structure in accordance with the theme, the most notable being that a pair (one man and one woman) would win the game, marking the first season in any Survivor franchise with multiple winners by design. As an additional twist, instead of being immediately eliminated from the game, voted out contestants would go to the Garden of Eden instead, to compete against other eliminated contestants for a chance to return to the game. The Garden of Eden features one male and one female contestant — Adam and Eve, respectively — at a time, who compete in a duel against the latest person of their gender eliminated. At a predetermined point in the game, the remaining Adam and Eve return to the game. The Garden of Eden is reminiscent of Utopia from the sixth and seventh seasons.

Before the merge, in order to get to know each other better, the tribes would spend the day following the Immunity Challenge together in the Blue Lagoon. The season also included a new challenge, the Amulet Challenge, taking place between the members of the tribe that won that cycle's Immunity Challenge. The three winners of the Amulet Challenge would spend the rest of the day with the losing tribe, and each get to give one member of the other tribe immunity from that night's Tribal Council. The Amulet Challenge was discontinued at the merge.

The format changed once the tribes were merged, at which point the remaining castaways competed in opposite-gender pairs. At the start of each cycle, the gender with fewer remaining players competed to determine their draft order. As the draft was always done with an odd number of players remaining, the leftover castaway was sent to the Garden of Eden. The pair that won each Immunity Challenge also earned the right to give immunity to a single player for the subsequent Tribal Council, while both members of the last-placed team were given a penalty vote; in the case the penalized contestant was given immunity by the challenge winners, their penalty vote was nullified. The vote was individual, with contestants voting by themselves and for one contestant, thus ensuring an odd number of contestants remaining for the next partner draft. The format also changed at the Garden of Eden, as the duels were competed in opposite-gender pairs as well.

== Contestants ==
Contestant	Original tribe	Switched tribe	Merged tribe	Main game	Garden of Eden	Finish
Caxton Njuki; 33, Oxelösund	None (Note: Caxton and Malin E. lost the challenge on Day 1 and were immediately sent to the Garden of Eden as a result.)			Lost challenge Episode 1	Lost Adam duel to John; Episode 3	27th
Zylfije Mehmeti; 27, Malmö	Srei			Eliminated by Bros (Note: Each contestant was instructed to create a profile of themselves to be shown to the other tribe. Both tribes then picked the member of the other tribe who seemed the least desirable. Zylfije and John were deemed the least desirable by the other tribe, and were sent to the Garden of Eden as a result.); Episode 1	Lost Eve duel to Malin E. Episode 3	26th
Gregorij Brattfors; 25, Gothenburg	Bros			1st voted out Episode 3	Quit; Episode 4	25th
John Nordin; 26, Härnösand	Bros			Eliminated by Srei; Episode 1	Lost Adam duel to Robin; Episode 6	24th
Alexandra Mogeswärd; 30, Nyköping	Srei			Quit; Episode 6		23rd
Torun Eriksson; 24, Säter	Srei			2nd voted out Episode 6	Eliminated by Robin; Episode 8	22nd
Malin Ericsson; 42, Sollentuna	None			Lost challenge Episode 1	Lost Eve duel to Marielle; Episode 9	21st
Marielle Sandgren; 30, Stockholm	None (Note: Marielle and Nellie were newcomers to the game. The Bros tribe chose one of the two to join the Srei tribe; they selected Nellie, and Marielle was immediately sent to the Garden of Eden as a result.)			Eliminated by Bros; Episode 7	Quit; Episode 11	20th
Paulina Brodd; 20, Stockholm	None (Note: Malin S., Paulina, and Vera were newcomers to the game. The Bros tribe chose two of the three to join the Strei tribe; they selected Vera and Malin S., and Paulina was immediately sent to the Garden of Eden as a result.)			Eliminated by Bros; Episode 10	Lost Eve duel to Nellie; Episode 12	19th
Kristoffer Hultling; 24, Karlskrona	None (Note: Filip and Kristoffer were newcomers to the game. The Srei tribe chose one of the two to enter the game; they selected Filip, and Kristoffer was immediately sent to the Garden of Eden as a result. Filip's entrance to the game initiated the tribe switch.)	None (Note: When the tribes were switched, Kristoffer, Nellie, Pontus, and Robin were already in the Garden of Eden.)		Eliminated by Srei; Episode 13	Lost challenger duel to Pontus; Episode 14	18th
Pontus Hermansson; Returned to Eden	Bros	None		4th voted out Episode 12	~~Lost Adam duel~~ ~~to Robin~~; ~~Episode 15~~ (Note: Pontus initially lost to Robin in an Adam duel; after Richard was medically evacuated before entering the Garden of Eden, Pontus, as the most recently eliminated player, took his place.)	
Richard Lundström; 29, Helsingborg	Bros	Srei		5th voted out Episode 15	Medically evacuated (Note: After being voted out of the game but before entering the Garden of Eden, Richard fell ill, and was not permitted to continue. Pontus, as the most recent eliminated player, took his place.); Episode 16	17th
Robin Malmström; 30, Stockholm	None (Note: Ali and Robin were newcomers to the game. The Srei tribe chose one of the two to join the Bros tribe; they selected Ali, and Robin was immediately sent to the Garden of Eden as a result.)	None	None (Note: When the tribes merged, Nellie, Pontus, and Robin were in the Garden of Eden.)	Eliminated by Srei; Episode 4	Lost Adam and Eve duel to Pontus and Denice; Episode 18	15th
Nellie Aalhuizen; 21, Dala-Järna	Srei	None	None	3rd voted out Episode 9	Lost Adam and Eve duel to Pontus and Denice; Episode 18	15th
Oskar Nordstrand; 23, Helsingborg	Bros	Bros	Sreros	6th voted out Episode 18	Lost Adam and Eve duel to Pontus and Denice; Episode 21	13th
Malin Sandberg; 28, Jönköping	Srei	Srei	Sreros	Not chosen (Note: As there were more women than men remaining, one woman was left without a partner; this castaway was not selected in the partner draft and immediately sent to the Garden of Eden.); Episode 20	Lost Adam and Eve duel to Pontus and Denice; Episode 21	13th
Ali Rouass; 28, Gothenburg	Bros	Bros	Sreros	7th voted out Episode 21	Lost Adam and Eve duel to Pontus and Denice; Episode 24	11th
Sara Söderman; 37, Nynäshamn	Srei	Bros	Sreros	Not chosen Episode 23	Lost Adam and Eve duel to Pontus and Denice; Episode 24	11th
Vera Kumpulainen; 24, Täby	Srei	Srei	Sreros	8th voted out Episode 24	Quit; Episode 24	10th
Filip Flink; 22, Eskilstuna	None	Srei	Sreros	Not chosen Episode 26	Lost Adam and Eve duel to Pontus and Denice; Episode 28	8th
Melissa Miller; 28, Borlänge	Srei	Srei	Sreros	9th voted out Episode 27	Lost Adam and Eve duel to Pontus and Denice; Episode 28	8th
Pontus Hermansson; Returned to game	Bros	None	None	4th voted out Episode 12	Adam; Returned to game	
Denice Andrée; Returned to game	Srei	Srei	Sreros	Not chosen Episode 17	Eve; Returned to game	
Kalle Zeman; 30, Stockholm	Bros	Bros	Sreros	Not chosen Episode 29		7th
David Stenroth; 34, Stockholm	Bros	Bros	Sreros	Lost final challenge Episode 30		2nd runners-up
Mia Mukkavaara; 26, Luleå	Srei	Srei	Sreros	Lost final challenge Episode 30		2nd runners-up
Pontus Hermansson; 38, Falköping	Bros	None	Sreros (Note: Pontus was originally on Eden when the tribes merged, but later returned to the game.)	Lost final vote Episode 30		Runners-up
Denice Andrée; 26, Stockholm	Srei	Srei	Sreros	Lost final vote Episode 30		Runners-up
Dan Spinelli Scala; 30, Stockholm	Bros	Bros	Sreros	Won final vote Episode 30		Winners
Jennifer Egelryd; 24, Tyresö	Srei	Bros	Sreros	Won final vote Episode 30		Winners

=== Partner history ===
Contestant	Partner				
Contestant	Cycle 6	Cycle 7	Cycle 8	Cycle 9	Cycle 10
Dan	Melissa	Melissa	Melissa	Jennifer	Jennifer
Jennifer	Oskar	Kalle	Kalle	Dan	Dan
Denice	Not chosen				Pontus
Pontus					Denice
David	Mia	Mia	Mia	Mia	Mia
Mia	David	David	David	David	David
Kalle	Malin S.	Jennifer	Jennifer	Melissa	Not chosen
Melissa	Dan	Dan	Dan	Kalle	
Filip	Vera	Vera	Vera	Not chosen	
Vera	Filip	Filip	Filip		
Sara	Ali	Ali	Not chosen		
Ali	Sara	Sara			
Malin S.	Kalle	Not chosen			
Oskar	Jennifer				

== Season summary ==
There would be two winners this season: One man and one woman. Everyone competed individually but the structure was designed so that the number of men and women were always equal. All contestants were young singles. There were two tribes of six, divided by gender. The losing tribe went to tribal council, as usual, but the winning tribe competed in a separate challenge to decide who would get to hand immunity to players in the losing tribe. In the women's tribe, Denice made a pact with Jennifer and Mia, primarily to take out Melissa Miller who was good at everything but didn't gel with the rest of the group. Everyone else disagreed with pact-making and wanted to break Denice's pact. Even the men worked to break the pact by distributing immunity to Melissa every time. Players scouted for potential partners of the other gender. Melissa formed a bond with Richard, which was the only romance in the season, but it didn't last long as Richard was blindsided. Many women wanted to work with Dan, a charismatic and athletic man. Each time a player was voted out, a new player took their place. Fresh players kept coming into the game to replace those voted out, even two weeks into the game. Despite officially opposing Denice's pact, three men formed an alliance of their own. The alliance was led by Kalle, joined by Dan and an under-the-radar guy. They threw a challenge to vote off Pontus, a muscular soldier, who was the biggest threat. After a few tribe swaps, the tribes merged. Players had to compete in immunity challenges as pairs. Before each immunity challenge, the gender with the fewest members competed for order of priority. The winner picked first from among the other gender, forming partners for the immunity challenge. That meant one person was not picked each time and they were eliminated. A campaign against Denice succeeded and she was not picked in the first round. However, her two alliance members remained to the final because they were selected as partners by the men of Kalle's pact. Dan and Melissa picked each other every time, forming a strong challenge partnership. They were often targeted but they were protected by Kalle's alliance. Kalle made false alliances with multiple additional partners and they all fell for it. His alliance kept voting out men to maintain control of the game, thus disallowing women from picking partners. Their respective female partners were just appendages for most of the game. However, in the final six, Jennifer convinced the men to vote off a woman and that allowed her to stir things up. She wanted to break up Dan and Melissa because she thought they would win the potential final. Having the first pick because of her challenge win, Jennifer picked Dan as partner, forcing Melissa to pick Kalle. Having split up Dan and Melissa, Jennifer took control of the game and voted out Melissa. Thus, Kalle was also eliminated as no woman was left to pick him. Dan then had no choice but to play the rest of the game with Jennifer. Players who were voted out or not picked as partners went to Garden of Eden, a separate island with room for one man and one woman, challenged by each newcomer. Since their respective eliminations, Denice and Pontus won every challenge, returning to the game. They qualified for the final alongside Dan and Jennifer who then won the jury vote by a landslide. The jury seemed to dislike the route that Pontus and Denice took to the final.

Pre-merge challenge winners and eliminations by cycle
Episode(s)	Original air date(s)	Newcomers		Garden of Eden			Immunity challenge	Amulet challenge		Eliminated	Finish
Episode(s)	Original air date(s)	Entered game	Not chosen	Adam and Eve	Challenger(s)	Eliminated	Immunity challenge	Winners	Immune	Eliminated	Finish
Arrival (Episode 1)	April 7, 2015									Caxton	Lost challenge (Note: Caxton and Malin E. lost the challenge on Day 1 and were immediately sent to the Garden of Eden as a result.)
Arrival (Episode 1)	April 7, 2015									Malin E.	Lost challenge
Arrival (Episode 1)	April 7, 2015			Caxton						John	Eliminated by the other tribe (Note: Each contestant was instructed to create a profile of themselves to be shown to the other tribe. Both tribes then picked the member of the other tribe who seemed the least desirable. Zylfije and John were deemed the least desirable by the other tribe, and were sent to the Garden of Eden as a result.)
Arrival (Episode 1)	April 7, 2015			Malin E.						Zylfije	Eliminated by the other tribe
Cycle 1 (Episodes 2, 3)	April 8, 9, 2015	None		Caxton	John	Caxton	Srei	Melissa	Richard	Gregorij	1st voted out
Cycle 1 (Episodes 2, 3)	April 8, 9, 2015	None		Malin E.	Zylfije	Zylfije	Srei	Sara	Pontus	Gregorij	1st voted out
Cycle 1 (Episodes 2, 3)	April 8, 9, 2015	None		Malin E.	Zylfije	Zylfije	Srei	Mia	Dan	Gregorij	1st voted out
Cycle 2 (Episodes 4, 5, 6)	April 14, 15, 16, 2015	Ali	Robin	John	Gregorij (Note: Gregorij decided to voluntarily leave the Garden.)	Gregorij	Bros	David	Jennifer	Alexandra	Quit
Cycle 2 (Episodes 4, 5, 6)	April 14, 15, 16, 2015	Ali	Robin	John	Robin	John	Bros	Ali	Sara	Alexandra	Quit
Cycle 2 (Episodes 4, 5, 6)	April 14, 15, 16, 2015	Ali	Robin	Malin E.	—N/a		Bros	Richard	Melissa	Torun	2nd voted out
Cycle 3 (Episodes 7, 8, 9)	April 21, 22, 23, 2015	Nellie	Marielle	Robin	—N/a		Bros	Oskar	Jennifer	Nellie	3rd voted out
Cycle 3 (Episodes 7, 8, 9)	April 21, 22, 23, 2015	Nellie	Marielle	Malin E.	Torun	Torun (Note: Torun was eliminated by Robin.)	Bros	Dan	Melissa	Nellie	3rd voted out
Cycle 3 (Episodes 7, 8, 9)	April 21, 22, 23, 2015	Nellie	Marielle	Malin E.	Marielle	Malin E.	Bros	Pontus	Sara	Nellie	3rd voted out
Cycle 4 (Episodes 10, 11, 12)	April 28, 29, 30, 2015	Vera	Paulina	Robin	—N/a		Srei	Melissa	Richard	Pontus	4th voted out
Cycle 4 (Episodes 10, 11, 12)	April 28, 29, 30, 2015	Malin S.	Paulina	Marielle	Nellie	Marielle (Note: Marielle decided to voluntarily leave the Garden.)	Srei	Malin S.	Dan	Pontus	4th voted out
Cycle 4 (Episodes 10, 11, 12)	April 28, 29, 30, 2015	Malin S.	Paulina	Marielle	Paulina	Paulina	Srei	Jennifer	Oskar	Pontus	4th voted out
Cycle 5 (Episodes 13, 14, 15)	May 5, 6, 7, 2015	Filip	Kristoffer	Robin	Pontus	Kristoffer (Note: Kristoffer and Pontus competed for the right to challenge Robin for the role of Adam; Pontus won.)	Bros	Vera		Richard	5th voted out
Cycle 5 (Episodes 13, 14, 15)	May 5, 6, 7, 2015	Filip	Kristoffer	Robin	Kristoffer	Pontus	Bros	Melissa		Richard	5th voted out
Cycle 5 (Episodes 13, 14, 15)	May 5, 6, 7, 2015	Filip	Kristoffer	Nellie	—N/a		Bros	Filip		Richard	5th voted out

Post-merge challenge winners and eliminations by cycle
Episode(s)	Original air date(s)	Not chosen	Garden of Eden			Immunity challenge		Voted out	Finish
Episode(s)	Original air date(s)	Not chosen	Adam and Eve	Challengers	Eliminated	Winners	Additional	Voted out	Finish
Cycle 6 (Episode 16, 17, 18)	May 12, 13, 14, 2015	Denice	Robin; Nellie	~~Richard~~; Pontus (Note: After being voted out of the game but before entering the Garden of Eden, Richard fell ill, and was not permitted to continue in the game. Pontus, as the most recent player eliminated, took his place.); Denice	Robin; Nellie	Dan; Melissa	Sara	Oskar	6th voted out
Cycle 7 (Episode 19, 20, 21)	May 19, 20, 21, 2015	Malin S.	Pontus; Denice	Oskar; Malin S.	Oskar; Malin S.	Filip; Vera	David	Ali	7th voted out
Cycle 8 (Episode 22, 23, 24)	May 26, 27, 28, 2015	Sara	Pontus; Denice	Ali; Sara	Ali; Sara	Dan; Melissa	None	Vera	8th voted out
Cycle 9 (Episode 25, 26, 27)	June 2, 3, 4 2015	Filip	Pontus; Denice	~~Vera~~ (Note: Vera decided not to enter the Garden of Eden.); Filip	—N/a	David; Mia	Jennifer	Melissa	9th voted out

Final week challenge winners and eliminations
Episode(s)	Original air date(s)	Garden of Eden			Not chosen	Reward challenge	Final challenge		Final Tribal Council	
Episode(s)	Original air date(s)	Adam and Eve	Challengers	Eliminated	Not chosen	Reward challenge	Winners	Eliminated	Finalists	Finish
Cycle 10 (Episode 28, 29, 30)	June 9, 10, 11 2015	Pontus; Denice (Note: Returned to game after winning the final duel.)	Filip; Melissa	Filip; Melissa	Kalle	Pontus; Denice	Dan; Jennifer	David; Mia	Pontus; Denice	Runners-up
Cycle 10 (Episode 28, 29, 30)	June 9, 10, 11 2015	Pontus; Denice	Filip; Melissa	Filip; Melissa	Kalle	Dan; Jennifer	Dan; Jennifer	David; Mia	Dan; Jennifer	Winners

== Game history ==
Pre-merge game and voting history
	Original tribes														Switched tribes
Episode #	1				3	4	6			7	9	10	12	13	15
Eliminated	Caxton	Malin E.	John	Zylfije	Gregorij	Robin	Alexandra	Tie (Note: The vote resulted in a tie between Torun and Denice. Per the rules, Jennifer, as the holder of the 1st-place amulet, broke the tie.)	Torun	Marielle	Nellie	Paulina	Pontus	Kristoffer	Richard
Vote	None (Note: Caxton and Malin E. lost the challenge on Day 1 and were immediately sent to the Garden of Eden as a result.)	None	None (Note: Each contestant was instructed to create a profile of themselves to be shown to the other tribe. Both tribes then picked the member of the other tribe who seemed the least desirable. Zylfije and John were deemed the least desirable by the other tribe, and were sent to the Garden of Eden as a result.)	None	4–1–1–1	None (Note: Ali and Robin were newcomers to the game. The Srei tribe chose one of the two to join the Bros tribe; they selected Ali, and Robin was immediately sent to the Garden of Eden as a result.)	None (Note: Alexandra chose to quit the game.)	3–3	1–0	None (Note: Marielle and Nellie were newcomers to the game. The Bros tribe chose one of the two to join the Strei tribe; they selected Marielle, and Nellie was immediately sent to the Garden of Eden as a result.)	5–1	None (Note: Malin S., Paulina, and Vera were newcomers to the game. The Bros tribe chose two of the three to join the Strei tribe; they selected Vera and Malin S., and Paulina was immediately sent to the Garden of Eden as a result.)	4–2–1	None (Note: Filip and Kristoffer were newcomers to the game. The Srei tribe chose one of the two to enter the game; they selected Filip, and Kristoffer was immediately sent to the Garden of Eden as a result. Filip's entrance to the game initiated the tribe switch.)	9–4–1 (Note: After the Bros tribe won immunity, both tribes were informed that, following the next day's Amulet Challenge, all remaining players—regardless of tribe—would cast a ballot in the next Tribal Council for one of the remaining eligible Srei members.)
Contestant	Place		Vote												
Dan	4th		In		Gregorij								Pontus		Denice
Jennifer		6th		In				Torun	Torun		Nellie				Richard
David	8th		In		Gregorij								Pontus		Richard
Mia		4th		In				Torun	None		Nellie				Richard
Kalle	5th		In		Oskar								Pontus		Richard
Melissa		5th		In				Denice	None		Nellie				Denice
Filip														In	Richard
Vera												In			Richard
Sara		3rd		In				Denice	None		Nellie				Denice
Ali						In							David		Richard
Malin S.												In			Richard
Oskar	1st		In		Gregorij								Pontus		Malin S.
Denice		1st		In				Torun	None		Nellie				Richard
Richard	6th		In		Gregorij								Ali		Denice
Kristoffer														Out	
Pontus	2nd		In		David								Ali		
Paulina												Out			
Nellie										In	Denice				
Marielle										Out					
Torun		7th		In				Denice	None						
Alexandra		8th		In											
Robin						Out									
Gregorij	3rd		In		Kalle										
Zylfije		2nd		Out											
John	7th		Out												
Malin E.		Out													
Caxton	Out														

Post-merge game and voting history
	Merged tribe									
Episode #	17	18	20	21	23	24	26	27	29	30
Eliminated	Denice	Oskar	Malin S.	Ali	Sara	Vera	Filip	Melissa	Kalle	David; Mia
Vote	None (Note: As there were more women than men remaining, one woman was left without a partner; Denice was not selected in the partner draft, and was immediately sent to the Garden of Eden.)	9–4–1	None (Note: As there were more women than men remaining, one woman was left without a partner; Malin S. was not selected in the partner draft, and was immediately sent to the Garden of Eden.)	7–3–1–0 (Note: Though David received a penalty vote for placing last in the Immunity Challenge, it was voided after Immunity Challenge winners Filip and Vera chose to give him additional immunity.)	None (Note: As there were more women than men remaining, one woman was left without a partner; Sara was not selected in the partner draft, and was immediately sent to the Garden of Eden.)	9–2–1–1	None (Note: As there were more men than women remaining, one man was left without a partner; Filip was not selected in the partner draft, and was immediately sent to the Garden of Eden.)	5–3	None	None (Note: David and Mia were eliminated after coming in last place in the final challenge.)
Contestant	Place	Vote	Place	Vote	Place	Vote	Place	Vote	Place	
Dan	1st	Oskar	1st	Ali	1st	Vera	1st	Kalle	3rd	1st
Jennifer	2nd	Filip	4th	Ali	3rd	Vera	1st	Melissa	3rd	1st
Denice	Out								1st	2nd
Pontus									1st	2nd
David	6th	Oskar	3rd	Ali	2nd	Vera	2nd	Melissa	2nd	Out
Mia	6th	Filip	3rd	Ali	2nd	Vera	2nd	Melissa	2nd	Out
Kalle	4th	Oskar	4th	Ali	3rd	Vera	3rd	Melissa	Out	
Melissa	1st	Oskar	1st	Ali	1st	Vera	3rd	Kalle		
Filip	5th	Oskar	2nd	Ali	4th	Kalle	Out			
Vera	5th	Oskar	2nd	Dan	4th	Jennifer				
Sara	3rd	Oskar	5th	Dan	Out					
Ali	3rd	Oskar	5th	Dan						
Malin S.	4th	Oskar	Out							
Oskar	2nd	Filip								
Penalty votes		Filip (Note: This contestant received a penalty vote for placing last in the Immunity Challenge.)		~~David~~		Filip (x2) (Note: Filip received two penalty votes: one for placing last in the Partner Challenge; and another for placing last in the Immunity Challenge.)		Kalle		
Penalty votes		Vera		Mia		Vera (x3) (Note: Vera received three penalty votes: one for being chosen by Filip, who placed last in the Partner Challenge; one for placing last in the Immunity Challenge; and another by Immunity Challenge winners Dan and Melissa.)		Melissa		

Final vote results
Jury vote
Episode #	30	
Finalists	Pontus; Denice	Dan; Jennifer
Votes	8–3	
Juror	Vote	
David		Dan; Jennifer
Mia		Dan; Jennifer
Kalle		Dan; Jennifer
Melissa		Dan; Jennifer
Filip		Dan; Jennifer
Sara	Pontus; Denice	
Ali	Pontus; Denice	
Malin S.	Pontus; Denice	
Oskar		Dan; Jennifer
Bonus votes (Note: The winning pair of the final challenge earned two votes to win in the final vote.)		Dan; Jennifer (x2)
