= Robinson 2011 =

- Season 13
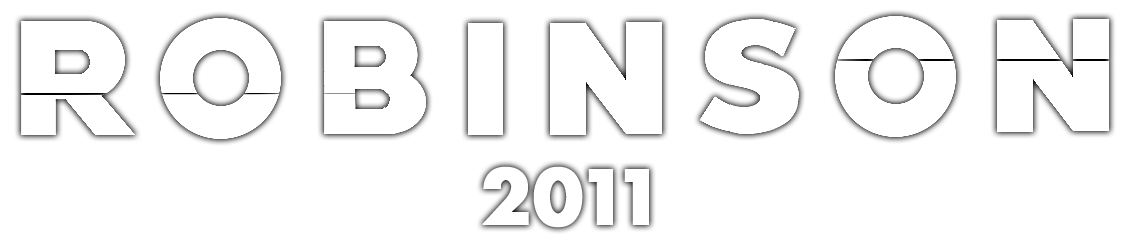
- Presented by: Paolo Roberto
- No. of days: 42
- No. of castaways: 20
- Winner: Mats Kemi
- Runner-up: Ola Ahlgren
- Location: El Nido, Palawan, Philippines
- No. of episodes: 13

Release
- Original network: TV4
- Original release: 29 August – 10 November 2011

Additional information
- Filming dates: 24 April – 7 June 2011

Season chronology
- ← Previous; 2010 Next → 2012

Robinson 2011 is the thirteenth season of the Swedish version of Survivor and had its premiere on 29 August 2011. Paolo Roberto returned to host this season.

Like the previous season, this season did not have a jury vote to decide the winner. Instead, it was a final challenge where Mats Kemi became the winner against runners-up Ola Ahlgren and Hanna Nygren.

== Contestants ==
Contestant	Original Tribe	New Tribes	Merged Tribe	Finish	Total votes
Fanny Castelius; 26, Falsterbo	Bontoc			Left Competition; Day 5	0
Ann-Louise "Lisa" Krantz; 36, Brandstorp	Bontoc			Left Competition; Day 5	0
Sana Bardi; 21, Sundbyberg	Bontoc			Lost Challenge; Day 9	0
Petra Ljungberg; 26, Helsingborg	Kalinga			Removed; Due to Illness; Day 12	0
Sophie Henriksson; 24, Malmö	Kalinga			Left Competition; Day 14	0
Hanna Sakko; 22, Stockholm	Kalinga			Left Competition; Day 14	0
Johan Jonsson; 21, Ljusdal	Kalinga^{3}			1st Voted Out; Day 17	6
Sigvald Harryson; Returned to game	Bontoc^{4}			2nd Voted Out; Day 20	4
Viktoriya Lyubar; 21, Malmö	Bontoc	None		Left Competition; Day 21	3
Michaela Edslätt; 20, Täby	Kalinga	Matal		3rd Voted Out; Day 23	6
Love Jarl; 24, Älvsjö	Kalinga^{2}	Matal		Left Competition; Day 24	0
Hjalmtyr Daregård; Returned to game	Bontoc^{4}	Gago		4th Voted Out; Day 26	5
Vicky Chand; 29, Solna	Kalinga^{4}	Matal	Naiwan	Left Competition; Day 28	0
Hjalmtyr Daregård; 21, Stockholm	Bontoc^{4}	Gago	Naiwan	5th Voted Out; Day 29	13
Denicé Lundevall; 30, Västerås	Kalinga	Matal	Naiwan	6th Voted Out; Day 33	5
Fredrik Sämsgård; 36, Stora Höga	Kalinga^{4}	Gago	Naiwan	7th Voted Out; Day 36	6
Fatima Nilsson; 43, Helsingborg	Kalinga	Gago	Naiwan	8th Voted Out; Day 39	6
Sigvald Harryson; 44, Malmö	Bontoc^{4}	Matal	Naiwan	9th Voted Out; Day 41	8
Louise Alvedal; 25, Hässleholm	Bontoc	Gago	Naiwan	10th Voted Out; Day 41	1
Hanna Nygren; 24, Helsingborg	Bontoc	Gago	Naiwan	2nd Runner-Up	0
Ola Ahlgren; 39, Onsala	Bontoc^{4}	Gago	Naiwan	Runner-Up	1
Mats Kemi; 52, Huddinge	Bontoc^{4}	Matal	Naiwan	Sole Survivor	1

The Total Votes is the number of votes a castaway has received during Tribal Councils where the castaway is eligible to be voted out of the game. It does not include the votes received during the final Tribal Council.

^1 The four women who entered later (Denicé, Lisa, Petra and Viktoriya) competed in a "tribe leader" challenge, where the winner would be the tribe leader of Kalinga and got to choose one of the other women to join her. The other two who weren't chosen (Lisa and Viktoriya) competed for the tribe leadership in Bontoc.

^2 After Kalinga won the second Reward Challenge, their tribe leader Denicé went to a Philippine prison where the men were held and got to choose one of the men to join her as a new tribemate. She chose Love.

^3 Michaela from Kalinga and Sana from Bontoc were chosen as sacrifices for the fourth Reward Challenge. The winner would be choosing one of the men to join her tribe while the loser would be eliminated. Michaela, who won the challenge, later chose Johan to join Kalinga.

^4 The tribe leaders (Denicé and Viktoriya) faced off in the fifth Reward Challenge. The winner would get to choose two more men to join her tribe, while the loser would get the men who weren't chosen.

== Results overview ==
The tribes originally consisted of only women and they had to compete for the opportunity to draft men. Before the tribes were formed, four women quit and one was medically evacuated for a cerebral haemorrhage. Another three quit before the merge, though one was for a legitimate reason (family emergency), and another quit after the merge. Because of the high drop-out rate, two tribal councils were declared null and void, allowing two eliminated players to return. When episode nine began, there had still only been two tribal councils and all in all, there were only six tribal councils in the season. All attempts at serious alliances failed and it became taboo to have such conversations. There were of course agreements between individuals, spoken or not, to never vote for each other. Votes were based on different criteria each tribal council. Before the merge, the criterion was simply strength in challenges. After the merge, three were voted out because they were untrustworthy. One was voted out because she won a challenge. In a mid-season twist, every player from both tribes had to vote for the man and woman they most thought deserved to win the game. The ones with the most votes were Hanna and Mats. Hanna was a likable girl praised for her positive attitude, survival skill, likability and tendency to support everyone. Mats was an older policeman, known for his strong morals, leadership and survival skills. He won a whole pig for his tribe but gave a third of it to the other tribe. Places in the final were decided by competitions starting at the final six. Half a season from the deservedness vote, Hanna and Mats won the two final spots. The jury also got to vote in a third finalist and unanimously selected Ola, a man praised for his humour and constantly positive attitude. The jury also got to penalize players in the final by placing weights on them. Mats got the least weight and he won the final multi-stage obstacle course by a good margin.

#	Episode Quote	Air Date	Challenges		Eliminated	Vote	Finish
#	Episode Quote	Air Date	Reward	Immunity	Eliminated	Vote	Finish
1	"Jag hade högklackat... jag hade fan inga bra trosor... ingenting alltså. Men det var bara att köra järnet!" – Hanna Sakko	29 August 2011	Kalinga	Denicé^{1} [Petra]	No Tribal Council occurred in this episode.		
2	"Det känns som om dom är inkräktare på vårat revir... Jag hatar när någon säger du skall göra det eller du skall göra det!" – Sana Bardi	30 August 2011	Kalinga	Viktoriya^{1} [Lisa]	Fanny	No vote	Left competition Day 5
2	"Det känns som om dom är inkräktare på vårat revir... Jag hatar när någon säger du skall göra det eller du skall göra det!" – Sana Bardi	30 August 2011	Kalinga	Viktoriya^{1} [Lisa]	Lisa	No vote	Left competition Day 5
3	"Tro det eller ej... men jag klär av mig naken." – Ola Ahlgren	31 August 2011	Hjalmtyr	None	No Tribal Council occurred in this episode.		
3	"Tro det eller ej... men jag klär av mig naken." – Ola Ahlgren	31 August 2011	Kalinga	None	No Tribal Council occurred in this episode.		
4	"Män are hunters and kvinnor are feeders..." – Vicky Chand	1 September 2011	Michaela^{3} Denicé^{4}	Bontoc	Sana^{3}	No vote	Lost challenge Day 9
4	"Män are hunters and kvinnor are feeders..." – Vicky Chand	1 September 2011	Michaela^{3} Denicé^{4}	Bontoc	Petra	No vote	Removed due to illness Day 12
4	"Män are hunters and kvinnor are feeders..." – Vicky Chand	1 September 2011	Michaela^{3} Denicé^{4}	Bontoc	The Tribal Council was cancelled in the fifth episode.^{5}		
5	"Vi är väldigt olika. Han är ju polis......men vi är kära i varandra." – Ola Ahlgren	8 September 2011	Bontoc	Bontoc	Sophie^{5}	No vote	Left competition Day 14
5	"Vi är väldigt olika. Han är ju polis......men vi är kära i varandra." – Ola Ahlgren	8 September 2011	Bontoc	Bontoc	Hanna S.^{5}	No vote	Left competition Day 14
5	"Vi är väldigt olika. Han är ju polis......men vi är kära i varandra." – Ola Ahlgren	8 September 2011	Bontoc	Bontoc	Johan	6–1	1st voted out Day 17
6	"Många av dom har ju psykopatiska drag och det har den där jäveln..." – Mats Kemi	15 September 2011	Bontoc	Kalinga	Sigvald	4–3	2nd voted out Day 20
7	"Eh... det känns ju inte sådär jättefett att vara dum..." – Denicé Lundevall	22 September 2011	Matal	Gago	Viktoriya	No vote	Left competition Day 21
7	"Eh... det känns ju inte sådär jättefett att vara dum..." – Denicé Lundevall	22 September 2011	Matal	Gago	Michaela	5–1	3rd voted out Day 23
8	"Det är ju jättemånga här som är under trettio och dom verkar inte förstå det här med arbete..." – Mats Kemi	6 October 2011	Cancelled	Matal	Love	No vote	Left competition Day 24
8	"Det är ju jättemånga här som är under trettio och dom verkar inte förstå det här med arbete..." – Mats Kemi	6 October 2011	Cancelled	Matal	Hjalmtyr	5–1	4th voted out Day 26
9	"Jag tänker inte riskera mitt liv för att leta efter några jävla bananer..." – Louise Alvedal	13 October 2011	None	Sigvald	Vicky	No vote	Left competition Day 28
9	"Jag tänker inte riskera mitt liv för att leta efter några jävla bananer..." – Louise Alvedal	13 October 2011	None	Hanna N.	The Tribal Council was aired in the tenth episode.		
10	"Stämningen var ju redan så låg den kunde bli... men det var den ju ändock inte utan det gick att få ned stämningen ännu lite lägre..." – Sigvald Harryson	20 October 2011	Denicé	Sigvald	Hjalmtyr	8–1	5th voted out Day 29
10	"Stämningen var ju redan så låg den kunde bli... men det var den ju ändock inte utan det gick att få ned stämningen ännu lite lägre..." – Sigvald Harryson	20 October 2011	Denicé	Sigvald	The Tribal Council was aired in the eleventh episode.		
11	"Mats fem och ett halvt år leker polis..." – Ola Ahlgren	28 October 2011	Mats, [Fredrik]	Sigvald	Denicé	5–2–1	6th voted out Day 33
11	"Mats fem och ett halvt år leker polis..." – Ola Ahlgren	28 October 2011	Mats, [Fredrik]	Sigvald	Fredrik	4–3	7th voted out Day 36
12	"Ditt lilla jävla benrangel, det är jag som bestämmer. Nu jädrar ska du va med här..." – Ola Ahlgren	3 November 2011	Hanna N.		Fatima^{6}	3–3	8th voted out Day 39
13	"Jag kände mig som en vilsen fågel, jag visste inte var jag skulle flyga någonstans..." – Louise Alvedal	10 November 2011	Mats		Sigvald^{7}, Louise^{7}	5–2–0	9th & 10th voted out Day 41
13	"Jag kände mig som en vilsen fågel, jag visste inte var jag skulle flyga någonstans..." – Louise Alvedal	10 November 2011	Ola^{7}		Sigvald^{7}, Louise^{7}	5–2–0	9th & 10th voted out Day 41
13	"Jag kände mig som en vilsen fågel, jag visste inte var jag skulle flyga någonstans..." – Louise Alvedal	10 November 2011	Final Challenge		Hanna N.	No vote	2nd runner-up
13	"Jag kände mig som en vilsen fågel, jag visste inte var jag skulle flyga någonstans..." – Louise Alvedal	10 November 2011	Final Challenge		Ola	No vote	Runner-up
13	"Jag kände mig som en vilsen fågel, jag visste inte var jag skulle flyga någonstans..." – Louise Alvedal	10 November 2011	Final Challenge		Mats	No vote	Sole survivor

In the case of multiple tribes or castaways who win reward or immunity, they are listed in order of finish, or alphabetically where it was a team effort; where one castaway won and invited others, the invitees are in brackets.

^5 The Tribal Council in the beginning of the fifth episode were cancelled. Instead of losing a tribemate (which would have been Michaela), they received a punishment because of Sophie and Hanna S.'s departure.

=== Episode Quotes ===
Translations of the original Swedish episode quotes are listed here:

1. "I had high heels... I didn't have any goddamn good panties... nothing at all. But I just had to give it my all!"
2. "It feels like they are intruders in our territory... I hate when someone says you should do this or you should do that!"
3. "Believe it or not... But I undress myself naked."
4. "Men are hunters and women are feeders..."
5. "We are very different. He is a cop... but we love each other."
6. "Many of them have psychopathic traits and that bastard has it..."
7. "Eh... it doesn't feel that good to be dumb..."
8. "There is a lot of people here who are under thirty and they don't seem to understand this thing called work..."
9. "I'm not going to risk my life looking for some damn bananas..."
10. "The mood was already as low it could be... but of course it wasn't, it was possible to bring down the mood even a little lower..."
11. "Mats five and a half years old playing cop..."
12. "You damn little skeleton, I'm the one in charge here. You should listen now, damn it..."
13. "I felt like a lost bird, I didn't know where I would fly..."

== Voting history ==
	Original Tribes						New Tribes				Merged Tribe						
Episode #:	2	4	5			6	7		8		9	10	11		12	13	
Eliminated:	Fanny	Sana	Sophie	None^{5}	Johan; 6/7 votes	Sigvald; 4/7 votes	Viktoriya; No vote	Michaela; 5/6 votes	Love; No vote	Hjalmtyr; 5/6 votes	Vicky; No vote	Hjalmtyr; 8/9 votes	Denicé; 5/8 votes	Fredrik; 4/7 votes	Fatima^{6} 3/6 votes	Sigvald^{7}	Hanna N.
Eliminated:	Lisa	Petra	Hanna S.	None^{5}	Johan; 6/7 votes	Sigvald; 4/7 votes	Viktoriya; No vote	Michaela; 5/6 votes	Love; No vote	Hjalmtyr; 5/6 votes	Vicky; No vote	Hjalmtyr; 8/9 votes	Denicé; 5/8 votes	Fredrik; 4/7 votes	Fatima^{6} 3/6 votes	Louise^{7}	Ola
Voter	Vote																
Mats						Viktoriya		Michaela				Hjalmtyr	Denicé	Fatima	Fatima		Final Challenge
Ola						Viktoriya				Hjalmtyr		Hjalmtyr	Denicé	Fatima	Fatima	Louise	Final Challenge
Hanna N.						Sigvald				Hjalmtyr		Hjalmtyr	Denicé	Fredrik	Sigvald		Final Challenge
Louise						Sigvald				Hjalmtyr		Hjalmtyr	Ola	Fredrik	Sigvald	Ola	
Sigvald						Viktoriya	Returns	Michaela				Hjalmtyr	Denicé	Fredrik	Fatima	Louise	
Fatima				~~Michaela~~	Johan					Hjalmtyr		Hjalmtyr	Fredrik	Fredrik	Sigvald	Ola	
Fredrik				~~Michaela~~	Johan					Hjalmtyr		Hjalmtyr	Denicé	Fatima		Ola	
Denicé				~~Michaela~~	Johan			Michaela				Hjalmtyr	Fredrik			Ola	
Hjalmtyr						Sigvald				Louise	Returns	Mats				Ola	
Vicky				~~Michaela~~	Johan			Michaela									
Love				~~Michaela~~	Johan			Michaela									
Michaela				~~Fatima~~	Johan			Sigvald									
Viktoriya						Sigvald											
Johan				~~Michaela~~	Michaela												
Hanna S.																	
Sophie																	
Petra																	
Sana																	
Lisa																	
Fanny																	

^6 Because of the tied vote between Fatima and Sigvald, they had to compete in a duel to decide who would be eliminated from the game.

^7 Four eliminated contestants came back to vote someone of the remaining contestants into the finale, alongside Hanna N. and Mats. All of the contestants besides the finalists could vote, and they could only vote for either Louise, Ola or Sigvald.
