= Martin Melin =

Swedish politician and television personality

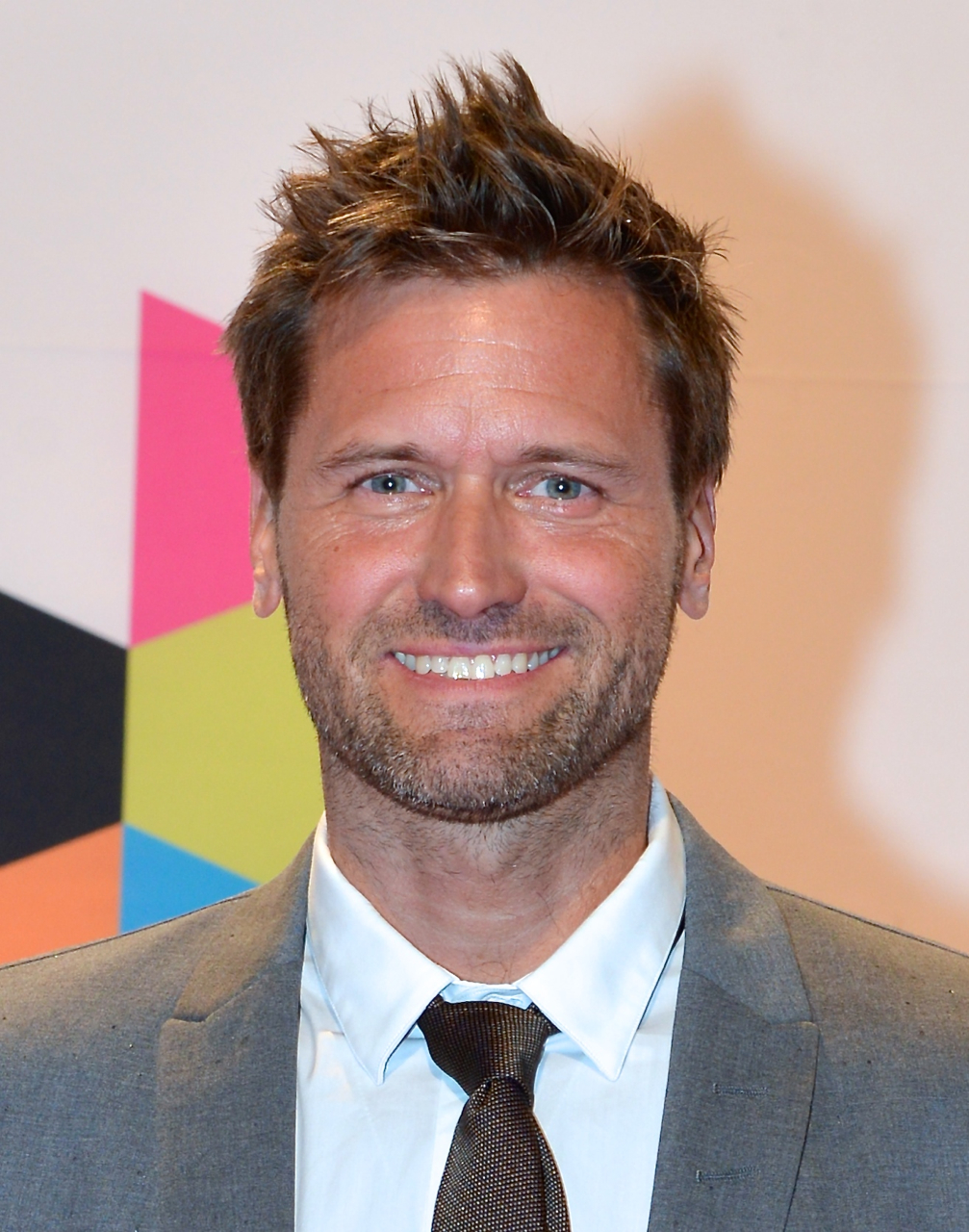
- Martin Melin in 2013

Member of the Swedish Parliament for Stockholm Municipality
- Incumbent
- Assumed office 31 October 2022

Personal details
- Born: Jan Martin Melin; 6 March 1967 (age 59) Stockholm, Sweden
- Party: Liberals
- Spouse: Camilla Läckberg (m. 2010; div. 2014)
- Occupation: Police officer
- Known for: Winner of Expedition Robinson 1997

Martin Melin (born 6 March 1967), is a Swedish author, police officer, politician and former television personality, and the world's first winner of the TV reality series Expedition Robinson (the first iteration of Survivor franchise) in 1997. Melin has been Member of the Swedish Parliament since August 2023, representing Stockholm Municipality. He previously replaced Joar Forssell as Member of the Swedish Parliament during the latter's leave of absence from 31 October 2022 to 30 April 2023.

Melin won the reality television show Expedition Robinson 1997 on 13 December. In the late 1990s, Melin appeared on numerous shows such as På rymmen, Jakten på ökenguldet and Hon och han. In 2015, he participated in the reality series Realitystjärnorna på godset alongside some of Sweden's best-known reality-series stars, such as Gunilla Persson. That series was broadcast on TV3.

Melin published a book called Coola pappor.

Melin is the son of historian Jan Melin. Melin was married to author Camilla Läckberg from 2010 to 2014 with whom he has one child together.
