= Expedition Robinson 1997 =

- Season 1
- Presented by: Harald Treutiger
- No. of days: 47
- No. of castaways: 16
- Winner: Martin Melin
- Runner-up: Kent Larsen
- Location: Babi Tengah, Malaysia
- No. of episodes: 12

Release
- Original network: SVT1
- Original release: September 13 – December 13, 1997

Additional information
- Filming dates: May 1997 – June 1997

Season chronology
- Next → 1998

Expedition Robinson 1997 is the first version of Expedition Robinson to air in Sweden, and the first season of the show anywhere in the world. This season premiered on 13 September 1997. Martin Melin became the winner on 13 December 1997, with a jury vote of 6–2 over runner-up Kent Larsen.

Despite being the premiere season, the first season was the lowest rated season of the original seven having only garnered around 1.2 million viewers for most of its regular episodes and 2.3 million viewers for its final episode. A major controversy occurred during this season when the first person voted out, Sinisa Savija, committed suicide a month after returning home from the island. Because of this, the first episode to air covered the events between the time when the contestants first arrived on the island and the second elimination.

Following the success of the first season, Åsa Vilbäck, Kent Larsen, and Martin Melin all became well known in Sweden.

== Finishing order ==
Contestant	Original Tribes	Merged Tribe	Finish
Sinisa Savija; 34, Norrköping	South Team		1st Voted Out; Day 4
Anna Nordenfeldt; 57, Uppsala	North Team		2nd Voted Out; Day 7
Peter Just; 51, Stockholm	North Team		3rd Voted Out; Day 11
Suzanne Lai; 39, Helsingborg	North Team		4th Voted Out; Day 14
Zai Gordon-White; 27, Södertälje	North Team		5th Voted Out; Day 18
Camilla Lundegård; 28, Borlänge	South Team		6th Voted Out; Day 21
Christin Johansson; 22, Copenhagen	North Team	Robinson	Evacuated; 1st Jury Member; Day 23
Johan Reffel; 23, Stockholm	South Team	Robinson	7th Voted Out; 2nd Jury Member; Day 27
Erika Bälldal; 37, Oxelösund	South Team	Robinson	8th Voted Out; 3rd Jury Member; Day 31
Jürgen Weis; 26, Gothenburg	North Team	Robinson	9th Voted Out; 4th Jury Member; Day 35
Marie-Louise Niklasson; 33, Malmö	South Team	Robinson	10th Voted Out; 5th Jury Member; Day 38
Markus Fondin; 19, Gothenburg	North Team	Robinson	11th Voted Out; 6th Jury Member; Day 41
Åsa Vilbäck; 23, Linköping	South Team	Robinson	12th Voted Out; 7th Jury Member; Day 44
Ola Melén; 25, Lund	South Team	Robinson	13th Voted Out; 8th Jury Member; Day 46
Kent Larsen; 61, Lycksele	South Team	Robinson	Runner-Up; Day 47
Martin Melin; 30, Stockholm	North Team	Robinson	Sole Survivor; Day 47

== Game ==
Air date	Challenges		Eliminated	Vote	Finish
Air date	Reward	Immunity	Eliminated	Vote	Finish
13 September 1997	North; Team	North Team	Sinisa	4-2-1-1	1st Voted Out; Day 4
13 September 1997	Both Teams	South Team	Anna	4-3-1	2nd Voted Out; Day 8
4 October 1997	North; Team	South Team	Peter	5-2	3rd Voted Out; Day 12
11 October 1997	North; Team	South Team	Suzanne	3-1-1-1	4th Voted Out; Day ?
18 October 1997	South Team	South Team	Zai	3-2	5th Voted Out; Day 18
25 October 1997	South Team	North Team	Camilla	6-1	6th Voted Out; Day 21
1 November 1997	Midsummer Celebration	Kent	Christin	No Vote	7th Evacuated; 1st Jury Member; Day 23
8 November 1997	Åsa	~~Kent~~ (Jürgen)	Johan	7-1-1	8th Voted Out; 2nd Jury Member; Day 27
15 November 1997	Jürgen	Jürgen	Erika^{1}	3-3-1-1	9th Voted Out; 3rd Jury Member; Day 31
22 November 1997	Ola, [Åsa]	Åsa	Jürgen	4-3	10th Voted Out; 4th Jury Member; Day 35
29 November 1997	Martin	Ola	Marie-Louise	4-2	11th Voted Out; 5th Jury Member; Day 38
6 December 1997	Åsa, [Martin]	Martin	Markus	3-2	12th Voted Out; 6th Jury Member; Day 41
13 December 1997	None	Martin	Åsa	1-0	13th Voted Out; 7th Jury Member; Day 44
13 December 1997	None	Martin	Ola	1-0	14th Voted Out; 8th Jury Member; Day 46
13 December 1997	Jury Vote		Kent	6-2	Runner-Up
13 December 1997	Jury Vote		Martin	6-2	Sole Survivor

In the case of multiple tribes or castaways who win reward or immunity, they are listed in order of finish, or alphabetically where it was a team effort; where one castaway won and invited others, the invitees are in brackets.

^1 The eighth vote was tied with Erika and Kent each receiving three votes. Following a tied second vote, a lot was drawn which led to Erika's eventual elimination.

== Voting history ==
	Original Tribes						Merged Tribe									
Episode #:	1		2	3	4	5	6	7	8	9	10	11	12			
Eliminated:	Sinisa; 4/8 votes	Anna; 4/8 votes	Peter; 5/7 votes	Suzanne; 3/6 votes	Zai; 3/5 votes	Camilla; 6/7 votes	Christin; No vote	Johan; 7/9 votes	Erika; 3/8 votes^{1}	Jürgen; 4/7 votes	Marie-Louise; 4/6 votes	Markus; 3/5 votes	Åsa; 1/1 vote	Ola; 1/1 vote	Kent; 2/8 votes	Martin; 6/8 votes
Voter	Vote															
Martin		Anna	Suzanne	Suzanne	Zai			Johan	Kent	Kent	Marie-Louise	Kent	Åsa	Ola	Jury Vote	
Kent	Sinisa					Camilla		Ola	Marie-Louise	Jürgen	Marie-Louise	Markus			Jury Vote	
Ola	Kent					Camilla		Johan	Erika	Jürgen	Marie-Louise	Markus			Kent	
Åsa	Marie-Louise					Camilla		Johan	Erika	Jürgen	Marie-Louise	Markus			Kent	
Markus		Anna	Peter	Zai	Zai			Johan	Kent	Kent	Kent	Kent				Martin
Marie-Louise	Sinisa					Camilla		Johan	Erika	Jürgen	Kent					Martin
Jürgen		Anna	Peter	Suzanne	Christin			Johan	Kent	Kent						Martin
Erika	Sinisa					Camilla		Johan	Markus							Martin
Johan	Camilla					Camilla		Erika								Martin
Christin		Peter	Peter	Suzanne	Zai											Martin
Camilla	Sinisa					Johan										
Zai		Anna	Peter	Martin	Christin											
Suzanne		Peter	Peter	Markus												
Peter		Suzanne	Suzanne													
Anna		Peter														
Sinisa	Marie-Louise															

^1 At the eighth tribal council both Erika and Kent received three votes. Following a re-vote, there was still a tie. Because of this, both were forced to draw lots to determine who would be eliminated.
