= Robinson Karibien =

2009 Swedish reality television season

- Season 11
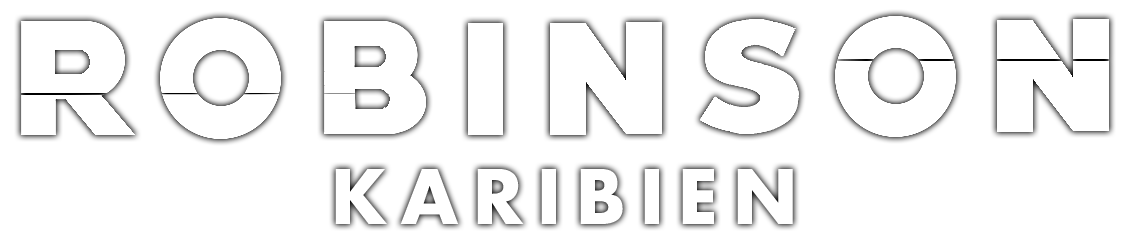
- Presented by: Paolo Roberto
- No. of days: 43 (42 whole days)
- No. of castaways: 18
- Winner: Hans Brettschneider
- Runner-up: Jimmy Führ
- Location: Samaná Province, Dominican Republic
- No. of episodes: 13

Release
- Original network: TV4
- Original release: 21 November 2009 – 30 January 2010

Season chronology
- ← Previous; 2009 Next → 2010

Robinson Karibien (English: Robinson Caribbean) is the eleventh season of Expedition Robinson to air in Sweden, with its premiere on 21 November 2009 on the Swedish television channel TV4. The host for this season were revealed on 25 June 2009 to be Paolo Roberto. In the end, Hans Brettschneider defeated Jimmy Führ with a vote of 5–3.

== Season summary ==
Robinson Karibien took place at the Samaná peninsula in the Dominican Republic and therefore were several elements that alluded to Caribbean phenomenon, especially voodoo. The tribe names was inspired from the loa spirits of the Voodoo religion practiced in Haiti - Agwé, Brise, Gede and Papa Legba. Also in several of the Reward and Immunity Challenges, various symbols associated with voodoo were used, including needles in voodoo dolls during the Tribal Councils - "voodoo curses".

The eighteen contestants were initially divided into two tribes, one for the men (Agwe) and one for the women (Brise). During episode 2, the tribes were mixed so each team consisted of four men and four women. Three contestants (Susanne, Angelica and Ewa) left the competition due to hunger, illness and personal reasons. Five contestants (Jonny, Tienne, Simon, Liliana and Sofia) were voted off in Tribal Councils.

When it was time for the merge into the Legba tribe, Agwe consisted of Anders, Mats and Jimmy and Brise consisted of Fredrik, Hans, Johan, Mikko, Suzanna and Veronica, while the voted out person Annika went to the new and secret tribe Ghede, where the voted off went to. When it was only four contestants in Legba, they competed against Ghede in a Reward Challenge, where Ghede were victorious. The contestants in Ghede were told they would have a challenge between them, where the winner would come back into Legba. Hans took the final place and went on competing against Jimmy, Suzanna and Anders. Hans and Jimmy went to the finals, there the other contestants voted on which of the two who would win Robinson Karibien. Hans won with five votes against Jimmy's three.

== Contestants ==
| Contestant | Original Tribes | Mixed Tribes | Episode 7 Tribes | Merged Tribe | Finish | Total votes |
|---|---|---|---|---|---|---|
| Jonny Cizmic; 35, Malmö | Agwe | | | | 1st Voted Out; Day 3 | 8 |
| Susanne Rosencrantz; 34, Kumla | Brise | Brise | | | Left Competition; Day 5 | 0 |
| Tienne Jonback; 22, Stockholm | Brise | Agwe | | | 2nd Voted Out; Day 6 | 7 |
| Angelica Höglund; 18, Lund | Brise | Brise | | | Left Competition; Day 8 | 0 |
| Simon Stålros; 23, Uddevalla | Agwe | Agwe | | | 3rd Voted Out; Day 9 | 4 |
| Liliana Palm; 58, Västra Frölunda | Brise | Agwe | | | 4th Voted Out; Day 12 | 5 |
| Ewa Ericsson; 55, Bispgården | Brise | Agwe | | | Left Competition; Day 14 | 3 |
| Sofia Sunnebo; 26, Sundbyberg | Brise | Agwe | | | 5th Voted Out; Day 15 | 2 |
| Annika Holtz; Returned to Agwe | Brise | Brise | | | 6th Voted Out; Day 18 | 4 |
| Annika Holtz; Returned to Ghede | Brise | Brise | Agwe | | 7th Voted Out; Day 21 | 7 |
| Hans Brettschneider; Returned to Ghede | Agwe | Brise | Brise | Legba | 8th Voted Out; Day 24 | 6 |
| Mats Thelin; Returned to Ghede | Agwe | Agwe | Agwe | Legba | 9th Voted Out; Day 27 | 6^{1} |
| Mikko Natri; Returned to Ghede | Agwe | Brise | Brise | Legba | 10th Voted Out; Day 30 | 4 |
| Fredrik Norrström; Returned to Ghede | Agwe | Brise | Brise | Legba | 11th Voted Out; Day 33 | 7 |
| Johan Häggblom; Returned to Ghede | Agwe | Brise | Brise | Legba | 12th Voted Out; Day 36 | 8 |
| Veronica Lundman; Returned to Ghede | Brise | Brise | Brise | Legba | 13th Voted Out; Day 39 | 2 |
| Annika Holtz; 28, Älvsjö | Brise | Brise | Agwe | Ghede^{2} | Eliminated in duel 1st Jury Member; Day 42 | 7 |
| Fredrik Norrström; 21, Örebro | Agwe | Brise | Brise | Ghede^{2} | Eliminated in duel 2nd Jury Member; Day 42 | 7 |
| Johan Häggblom; 50, Gothenburg | Agwe | Brise | Brise | Ghede^{2} | Eliminated in duel 3rd Jury Member; Day 42 | 8 |
| Mats Thelin; 48, Vaxholm | Agwe | Agwe | Agwe | Ghede^{2} | Eliminated in duel 4th Jury Member; Day 42 | 6^{1} |
| Mikko Natri; 35, Mölndal | Agwe | Brise | Brise | Ghede^{2} | Eliminated in duel 5th Jury Member; Day 42 | 4 |
| Veronica Lundman; 31, Strängnäs | Brise | Brise | Brise | Ghede^{2} | Eliminated in duel 6th Jury Member; Day 42 | 2 |
| Hans Brettschneider; Returned to Legba | Agwe | Brise | Brise | Ghede^{2} | Won duel Day 42 | 6 |
| Anders Sjöström; 43, Älvsjö | Agwe | Agwe | Agwe | Legba | Lost Challenge; 7th Jury Member; Day 43 | 10 |
| Suzanna Benjaminsson; 39, Skara | Brise | Brise | Brise | Legba | Lost Challenge; 8th Jury Member; Day 43 | 1 |
| Jimmy Führ; 32, Örebro | Agwe | Agwe | Agwe | Legba | Runner-Up; Day 43 | 5 |
| Hans Brettschneider; 43, Skellefteå | Agwe | Brise | Brise | Legba | Sole Survivor; Day 43 | 6 |

The Total Votes is the number of votes a castaway has received during Tribal Councils where the castaway is eligible to be voted out of the game. It does not include the votes received during the final Tribal Council.

^1 Because Mats had immunity, one vote against him did not count.
^2 Eliminated contestants went to the Ghede tribe (but still had a chance to win Robinson Karibien).

== Results overview ==
| Episode | First air date | Challenges | | Eliminated | Vote | Finish |
| Episode | First air date | Reward | Immunity | Eliminated | Vote | Finish |
|---|---|---|---|---|---|---|
| 1 | 21 November 2009 | Brise | | Jonny | 8−1 | 1st Voted Out; Day 3 |
| 2 | 28 November 2009 | Agwe | Brise | Susanne | No vote | Left Competition; Day 5 |
| 2 | 28 November 2009 | Agwe | Brise | Tienne | 7−1 | 2nd Voted Out; Day 6 |
| 3 | 5 December 2009 | Agwe | Brise | Angelica | No vote | Left Competition; Day 8 |
| 3 | 5 December 2009 | Agwe | Brise | Simon | 4−2−1 | 3rd Voted Out; Day 9 |
| 4 | 12 December 2009 | Brise | Brise | Liliana | 5−1 | 4th Voted Out; Day 12 |
| 5 | 19 December 2009 | Brise | Brise | Ewa | No vote | Left Competition; Day 14 |
| 5 | 19 December 2009 | Brise | Brise | Sofia | 2-1-1 | 5th Voted Out; Day 15 |
| 6 | 26 December 2009 | Brise | Agwe | Annika | 4−3 | 6th Voted Out; Day 18 |
| 7 | 2 January 2010 | Brise | Brise | Annika | 3−1 | 7th Voted Out; Day 21 |
| 8 | 9 January 2010 | Brise | Mats | Hans | 6−4−2−1 | 8th Voted Out; Day 24 |
| 9 | 16 January 2010 | Mats | Veronica | Mats | 5−3 | 9th Voted Out; Day 27 |
| 10 | 23 January 2010 | Suzanna | Johan | Mikko | 4−2−1 | 10th Voted Out; Day 30 |
| 11 | 27 January 2010 | Anders, Suzanna, Veronica | Jimmy | Fredrik | 4−2 | 11th Voted Out; Day 33 |
| 12 | 28 January 2010 | Ghede | Suzanna | Johan | 3−2 | 12th Voted Out; Day 36 |
| 12 | 28 January 2010 | Ghede | Suzanna | Veronica | 2−2 | 13th Voted Out; Day 39 |
| 13 Finale | 30 January 2010 | Hans^{8} | | Annika, Fredrik, Johan, Mats, Mikko, Veronica | No vote | Eliminated in duel Day 42 |
| 13 Finale | 30 January 2010 | Jimmy^{9} | Hans^{9} | Anders | No vote | Lost Challenge; Day 43 |
| 13 Finale | 30 January 2010 | Jimmy^{9} | Hans^{9} | Suzanna | No vote | Lost Challenge; Day 43 |
| 13 Finale | 30 January 2010 | Jury Vote | | Jimmy | 5−3 | Runner-Up |
| 13 Finale | 30 January 2010 | Jury Vote | | Hans | 5−3 | Sole Survivor |

In the case of multiple tribes or castaways who win reward or immunity, they are listed in order of finish, or alphabetically where it was a team effort; where one castaway won and invited others, the invitees are in brackets.

^8 The Ghede tribe competed for a place back in the Legba tribe.
^9 These were competitions to decide who would get a place in the finals. The first one was won by Jimmy, so Anders, Hans and Suzanna competed in the second one.

== Voting history ==
| | Original Tribes | Mixed Tribes | | | | | | | | Second Swap | Merged Tribe | | | | | | |
|---|---|---|---|---|---|---|---|---|---|---|---|---|---|---|---|---|---|
| Episode: | 1 | 2 | | 3 | | 4 | 5 | | 6 | 7 | 8 | 9 | 10 | 11 | 12 | | 13 |
| Eliminated: | Jonny; 8/9 votes | Susanne; No vote | Tienne; 7/8 votes | Angelica; No vote | Simon; 4/7 votes | Liliana; 5/6 votes | Ewa; No vote | Sofia; 2/4 votes | ~~Annika~~; 4/7 votes | Annika; 3/4 votes | Hans; 6/15 votes | Mats; 5/8 votes | Mikko; 4/7 votes | Fredrik; 4/6 votes | Johan; 3/5 votes | Veronica; 2/4 votes^{7} | Anders, Suzanna; No vote |
| Voter | Vote | | | | | | | | | | | | | | | | |
| Hans | Jonny | | | | | | | | Annika | | Anders | | | | | | |
| Jimmy | Jonny | | Tienne | | Ewa | Liliana | | Sofia | | Annika | Hans | Mats | Mikko | Johan | Johan | Veronica | |
| Suzanna | | | | | | | | | Johan | | Hans | Mats | Mikko | Fredrik | Johan | Jimmy | |
| Anders | Jonny | | Tienne | | Simon | Liliana | | Jimmy | | Annika | Hans | Mats | Mikko | Fredrik | Johan | Veronica | |
| Veronica | | | | | | | | | Johan | | Anders | Mats | Fredrik | Fredrik | Anders | Jimmy | |
| Johan | Jonny | | | | | | | | Annika | | Anders | Anders | Fredrik | Fredrik | Anders | | |
| Fredrik | Jonny | | | | | | | | Annika | | Hans | Mats | Mikko | Johan | | | |
| Mikko | Jonny | | | | | | | | Annika | | Anders | Anders | Suzanna | | | | |
| Mats | Jonny | | Tienne | | Ewa | Liliana | | Sofia | | Annika | Hans | Anders | | | | | |
| Annika | | | | | | | | | Johan | Anders | Hans^{4} | | | | | | |
| Sofia | | | Tienne | | Simon | Liliana | | Mats | | | ~~Mats~~^{4} ^{5} | | | | | | |
| Ewa | | | Tienne | | Simon | Liliana | | | | | | | | | | | |
| Liliana | | | Tienne | | Simon | Ewa | | | | | Jimmy^{4} | | | | | | |
| Simon | Jonny | | Tienne | | Jimmy | | | | | | ~~Liliana~~^{4} ^{6} | | | | | | |
| Angelica | | | | | | | | | | | | | | | | | |
| Tienne | | | Jimmy | | | | | | | | Jimmy^{4} | | | | | | |
| Susanne | | | | | | | | | | | | | | | | | |
| Jonny | Fredrik | | | | | | | | | | Fredrik^{4} | | | | | | |

Jury Vote
| Finalist: | Jimmy; 3/8 votes | Hans; 5/8 votes |
| Juror | Vote | |
| Suzanna | Jimmy | |
| Anders | Jimmy | |
| Veronica | | Hans |
| Johan | | Hans |
| Fredrik | Jimmy | |
| Mikko | | Hans |
| Mats | | Hans |
| Annika | | Hans |

^4 In previous Tribal Councils, the person voted off had to put one needle in one of the voodoo dolls that represented each of his/her former tribe members. This later became votes in the eighth Tribal Council.
^5 Because Mats had immunity, the vote (from Sofia) against him did not count.
^6 Because Liliana already was voted off, the vote (from Simon) against her did not count.
^7 After the Tribal Council ended in a tie, the remaining contestants (Anders and Suzanna) had to discuss about which one they would vote off. They decided to vote off Veronica.
