= Robinson 2010 =

- Season 12
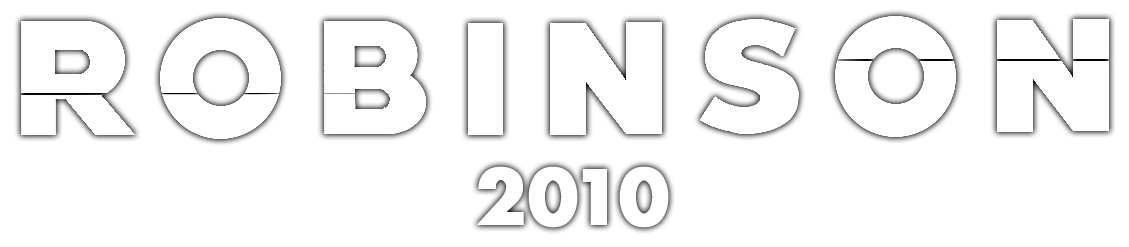
- Presented by: Paolo Roberto
- No. of days: 42
- No. of castaways: 21 (3 jokers)
- Winner: Erik Svedberg
- Runner-up: Heléne Ekelund
- Location: Caramoan Peninsula, Philippines
- No. of episodes: 13

Release
- Original network: TV4
- Original release: 7 October – 18 December 2010

Additional information
- Filming dates: 23 May 2010 – June 2010

Season chronology
- ← Previous; Karibien Next → 2011

Robinson 2010 is the twelfth season of the Swedish version of Survivor and premiered on TV4 on 7 October 2010. Paolo Roberto returned as host for this season.

The filming took place between 23 May and June 2010 in the Philippines. The very first received applications from the channel's website were lost, due to an error in the form. In this season, Paolo Roberto handpicked the contestants in the final process of the casting in order to minimize drop-outs during the season.

Unlike previous seasons, this season did not feature a jury vote to decide the winner. Instead, there was a final challenge in which Erik Svedberg won against Heléne Ekelund.

== Contestants ==
Contestant	Original tribe	Episode 3–5 Tribes	Buwanga vs. Kalis	Merged tribe	Finish	Total votes
Moa Brismo; 33, Åkersberga	Sarimanok				1st Voted Out; Day 3	4
Josefin Bergqvist; Returned to Kalis	Sarimanok				Lost Challenge; Day 6	0
Flavia Rydström; 27, Skövde	Sarimanok				2nd Voted Out; Day 6	4
Gökhan "Gurkan" Gasi; 26, Västerås	Sarimanok	Sarimanok			3rd Voted Out; Day 10	7
Anders "Löken" Löfgren; 51, Gustafs	Buwanga	Buwanga			4th Voted Out; Day 13	6
Kristina "Kinna" Karlsson; 30, Motala	Sarimanok	Sarimanok			Left Competition; Day 14	3^{4}
Elin Bjerre; Returned to Kalis	Buwanga	Buwanga			Voted Out to Kalis; Day 15	4
Josefin Bergqvist; 22, Ängelholm	Sarimanok	Kalis^{3}	Kalis		5th Voted Out; Day 16	7
Peter Janeröd; 53, Linköping	Sarimanok	Sarimanok	Buwanga^{5}		6th Voted Out; Day 19	8
Margareta Kingham; 37, Copenhagen, Denmark	Buwanga^{1}	Buwanga	Buwanga		7th Voted Out; Day 22	8
Magdalena "Maggie" Divina; Returned to Charon		Kalis	Kalis		Voted Out to Charon; Day 24	6
Ozan Kilic; Returned to Charon	Sarimanok^{1}	Sarimanok	Buwanga^{5}		Voted Out to Charon; Day 24	5
Elin Bjerre; Returned to Charon	Buwanga	Buwanga	Kalis^{4}	Lubad	Voted Out to Charon; Day 26	12
Daniel Sjökvist; Returned to Charon	Buwanga	Kalis^{7}	Kalis	Lubad	Voted Out to Charon; Day 30	6
Magdalena "Maggie" Divina; 27, Märsta		Kalis	Kalis	Charon	Eliminated on Charon; Day 32	6
Mats Juhlin; Returned to Charon	Buwanga	Buwanga	Buwanga	Lubad	Voted Out to Charon; Day 33	8
Ozan Kilic; 25, Sundbyberg	Sarimanok^{1}	Sarimanok	Buwanga^{5}	Charon	Eliminated on Charon; Day 34	5
Marcus Metsomäki; 22, Stockholm	Buwanga	Buwanga	Buwanga	Lubad	8th Voted Out; Day 35	15^{E}
Mikaela "Misha" Benes; 37, Växjö	Buwanga^{2}	Buwanga	Kalis^{4}	Lubad	Removed; Due To Illness; Day 37	4
Sara Shalabi; Returned to Charon	Buwanga	Buwanga	Buwanga	Lubad	Lost Challenge; Day 39	1
Tommy Bang; Returned to Charon		Kalis	Kalis	Lubad	Voted Out to Charon; Day 39	5^{E}
Elin Bjerre; 24, Stockholm	Buwanga	Buwanga	Kalis^{4}	Charon	Eliminated on Charon; Day 40	12
Daniel Sjökvist; 36, Tofta	Buwanga	Kalis^{7}	Kalis	Charon	Eliminated on Charon; Day 40	6
Sara Shalabi; 31, Stockholm	Buwanga	Buwanga	Buwanga	Charon	Eliminated on Charon; Day 40	1
Tommy Bang; 36, Hammarö		Kalis	Kalis	Charon	Eliminated on Charon; Day 40	5^{E}
Mats Juhlin; Returned to Lubad	Buwanga	Buwanga	Buwanga	Charon	Won on Charon; Day 40	8
Jukka Hedemäki; 42, Dals Rostock	Buwanga	Buwanga	Buwanga	Lubad	Lost Challenge; Day 41	1
Kristoffer Ekberg; 33, Varberg		Kalis	Kalis	Lubad	Lost Challenge; Day 41	6
Mats Juhlin; 40, Åkersberga	Buwanga	Buwanga	Buwanga	Lubad	9th Voted Out; Day 42	15
Heléne Ekelund; 47, Trollhättan	Sarimanok^{1}	Sarimanok	Buwanga^{5}	Lubad	Runner-Up; Day 42	2
Erik Svedberg; 27, Sundsvall	Sarimanok	Kalis^{7}	Kalis	Lubad	Sole Survivor; Day 42	4

The Total Votes is the number of votes a castaway has received during Tribal Councils where the castaway is eligible to be voted out of the game.

^1 Heléne, Margareta & Ozan were eliminated in a pre-season challenge. They were given a second chance, and were locked in a cage and moved to a lone beach. They was brought back into the game after the second Reward Challenge, in which Sarimanok chose Heléne & Ozan over fire, while Buwanga got the fire and Margareta.

^2 Misha wasn't picked in the first Reward Challenge, but joined Buwanga after they had won the first Immunity challenge.

^3 Josefin were Sarimanok's sacrifice in the second Immunity Challenge, in which they lost and Josefin was eliminated. She were given a second chance and was moved to another lone beach to start the new tribe Kalis.

^4 Buwanga had a Tribal Council at their beach; in which Elin were eliminated. Elin were later instructed to pick one contestant she thought was the least deserving player to win; she chose Misha, who was also eliminated. But as it later turned out, they were both moved to Kalis instead of having been eliminated from the competition.

^5 The remaining contestants in Sarimanok were merged with Buwanga; keeping Buwangas name and tribe color.

== Results overview ==
In the first episode, a race to the top of a hill decided who would be leader of each tribe. Leaders would get permanent immunity in their tribe. Daniel finished first and Erik second. It remained that way throughout the game. Daniel's tribe kept winning while Erik's tribe finished just behind. Even after the merge, Erik often finished second in challenges, often behind Daniel. There were constant twists from the beginning to the end. For all sorts of reasons, players were moved back and forth between teams and locations. Step by step, a whole new team formed, which included both Daniel and Erik who lost their leadership positions in a challenge. The two of them formed a strong bond and their tribe came into the merge numerically superior. Daniel made a list of players from the other tribe which determined in which order they should be voted off. He tried to micromanage people. The other players found him overly bossy and most of his former tribe members turned against him. As a reaction against Daniel's alliance attempt, Helene, an older yet athletic woman, became puppet master of a four-person alliance. They stood against Daniel, Erik and their final remaining ally, Kristoffer. The remaining four players were free agents. They agreed to vote off Daniel as soon as he didn't win immunity. After that, Helene had complete grasp of the game. Players seemed afraid of her. If anyone heard any relevant information, they told her immediately. If she suspected anyone of gunning for her, she had them voted off. She became the godmother of the game. Erik had a good relationship with Helene. He told her about Daniel's list, inviting her to their alliance, but he left out the fact that her name was fourth on the list, hoping to use her for three votes. She didn't take the bait but it seemed to make her trust him. Once Daniel was out, Erik expected to go next. However, Helene invited him to her alliance and used his vote to blindside her own alliance member, Mats. Thus, Erik found himself in the core alliance which held strong to the end. The free agents never tried to make moves. In the final eight, there was even a twist where four people were voted off one by one, showing in which order Helene's alliance were voting. The twist was however all for show and the four people who were voted out were not actually eliminated. Nevertheless, they all accepted their fate and were indeed voted off later, although in a different order. They never considered joining up to make it a four-on-four. Elimination competitions began at final five. Mats became the fifth player by winning the return challenge, even defeating challenge beast Daniel. Helene and Erik won the two qualification challenges for the final. However, in yet another twist, Mats became the third finalist because he was the final five member with the most challenge wins throughout the game. Then, in a final twist, the jury didn't vote for a winner. Instead, they had to vote off one member and the remaining two battled it out in a multi-stage obstacle course. Mats was voted out and then Erik won the challenge against Helene.

#	Episode quotes	First air date	Challenges		Eliminated	Vote	Finish
#	Episode quotes	First air date	Reward	Immunity	Eliminated	Vote	Finish
1	"Om Paolo har samma krav på oss som han har på sig själv kommer vi att dö..."	7 October 2010	Buwanga	Daniel, Erik	The Tribal Council was aired in the second episode		
1	"Om Paolo har samma krav på oss som han har på sig själv kommer vi att dö..."	7 October 2010	Buwanga	Buwanga	The Tribal Council was aired in the second episode		
2	"Jag fattar inte att jag är så dum i huvudet som vill utsätta mig för det här jävla helvetet..."	14 October 2010	Sarimanok	Buwanga	Moa	4–3	1st Voted Out; Day 3
2	"Jag fattar inte att jag är så dum i huvudet som vill utsätta mig för det här jävla helvetet..."	14 October 2010	Sarimanok	Buwanga	Flavia	4–2–1	2nd Voted Out; Day 6
3	"Det är ett spel alltså. För vissa blir det game over... så enkelt är det. Packa väskan och åk hem..."	21 October 2010	Buwanga	Buwanga	Gurkan	4–2–2^{6}	3rd Voted Out; Day 10
4	"Jag skulle inte säga att han är onormal, men han är inte stöpt i dalmasformen om man säger så..."	28 October 2010	Kalis^{7}	Sarimanok	Löken	6–2	4th Voted Out; Day 13
5	"Det är en 3-stjärnig resort det här så jag trivs som en björn i en myrstack..."	4 November 2010	Buwanga	Buwanga	Kinna	No vote	Left Competition; Day 14
5	"Det är en 3-stjärnig resort det här så jag trivs som en björn i en myrstack..."	4 November 2010	Buwanga	Buwanga	Elin, [Misha]	4–2–1^{4}	Voted Out to Kalis; Day 15
5	"Det är en 3-stjärnig resort det här så jag trivs som en björn i en myrstack..."	4 November 2010	Buwanga	Buwanga	The Tribal Council was aired in the sixth episode		
6	"Vi känner ingen sympati för det andra laget överhuvudtaget... Vi tycker riktigt illa om dom!"	11 November 2010	Kalis	Kalis	Josefin	7–1	5th Voted Out; Day 16
6	"Vi känner ingen sympati för det andra laget överhuvudtaget... Vi tycker riktigt illa om dom!"	11 November 2010	Kalis	Kalis	Peter	6–1–1	6th Voted Out; Day 19
7	"Jag är ingen skogsmulle. Jag är ingen jävla djungeltjej. Men va fan man är ingen idiot bara för det."	18 November 2010	Buwanga	Kalis	Margareta	6–1	7th Voted Out; Day 22
7	"Jag är ingen skogsmulle. Jag är ingen jävla djungeltjej. Men va fan man är ingen idiot bara för det."	18 November 2010	Buwanga	Marcus^{8}	Margareta	6–1	7th Voted Out; Day 22
8	"Ja men alltså... Hur dum får man va. Han är ju kokt..."	25 November 2010	Buwanga	Daniel	Maggie	6–1	Voted Out to Charon^{9} Day 24
8	"Ja men alltså... Hur dum får man va. Han är ju kokt..."	25 November 2010	Buwanga	Daniel	Ozan	4–2	Voted Out to Charon^{9} Day 24
8	"Ja men alltså... Hur dum får man va. Han är ju kokt..."	25 November 2010	Buwanga	Daniel	Elin	8–3–1^{E}	Voted Out to Charon^{9} Day 26
9	"Helt ärligt... det var det dummaste vi eller jag har gjort under Robinson"	2 December 2010	Erik	Mats	Daniel	6–4–1^{E}	Voted Out to Charon^{9} Day 30
10	"Jag har sagt det tusen gånger. Svik mig inte för då ryker man..."	9 December 2010	Heléne [Sara]	Erik	Maggie	No vote	Eliminated on Charon; Day 32
10	"Jag har sagt det tusen gånger. Svik mig inte för då ryker man..."	9 December 2010	Heléne [Sara]	Erik	The Tribal Council was aired in the eleventh episode		
11	"Man ska fan ha lite stake i sig liksom... och stå upp för sin sak..."	16 December 2010	Kristoffer, Marcus, Misha, Tommy	Erik	Mats	5–4–1^{E}	Voted Out to Charon^{9} Day 33
11	"Man ska fan ha lite stake i sig liksom... och stå upp för sin sak..."	16 December 2010	Kristoffer, Marcus, Misha, Tommy	Erik	Ozan	No vote	Eliminated on Charon; Day 34
11	"Man ska fan ha lite stake i sig liksom... och stå upp för sin sak..."	16 December 2010	Kristoffer, Marcus, Misha, Tommy	Erik	Marcus	8–1^{E}	8th Voted Out; Day 35
12	"Ska jag överleva själv måste jag kanske ljuga någon rakt i ansiktet..."	17 December 2010	None	Kristoffer Heléne	Misha	No vote	Removed Due To Illness; Day 37
12	"Ska jag överleva själv måste jag kanske ljuga någon rakt i ansiktet..."	17 December 2010	None	Kristoffer Heléne	Sara	No vote	Eliminated to Charon^{9} Day 39
12	"Ska jag överleva själv måste jag kanske ljuga någon rakt i ansiktet..."	17 December 2010	None	Kristoffer Heléne	Tommy	3–1–1	Voted Out to Charon^{9} Day 39
13	"Köööööööööör"	18 December 2010	Mats		Daniel, Elin, Sara, Tommy	No vote	Eliminated on Charon; Day 40
13	"Köööööööööör"	18 December 2010	Erik		Jukka, Kristoffer	No vote	Lost Challenge; Day 41
13	"Köööööööööör"	18 December 2010	Heléne		Jukka, Kristoffer	No vote	Lost Challenge; Day 41
13	"Köööööööööör"	18 December 2010	Mats		Jukka, Kristoffer	No vote	Lost Challenge; Day 41
13	"Köööööööööör"	18 December 2010	Jury Vote		Mats	7–3	9th Voted Out; Day 42
13	"Köööööööööör"	18 December 2010	Final Challenge		Heléne	No vote	Runner-Up
13	"Köööööööööör"	18 December 2010	Final Challenge		Erik	No vote	Sole Survivor

In the case of multiple tribes or castaways who win reward or immunity, they are listed in order of finish, or alphabetically where it was a team effort; where one castaway won and invited others, the invitees are in brackets.

^6 Kinna received two extra votes against her (from the previous Tribal Council) in order to get a fire striker for her tribe, Sarimanok.

^7 The team leaders of Buwanga and Sarimanok (Daniel & Erik respectively) faced the men of Kalis (Kristoffer & Tommy). If they'd lost, they would be new members of Kalis.

^8 Kalis had the opportunity to save one contestant in Buwanga's Tribal Council from elimination. They chose Marcus.

^9 He/She were voted/eliminated out of the competition; but joined the new Charon tribe where only one contestant would come back later to the game.

^E He/She came in last in the Immunity Challenge and received one vote extra in the Tribal Council.

=== Episode quotes ===
Translation of the original Swedish episode quotes and who that said it is listed here:

1. "If Paolo has the same demands on us as he has on himself, we will die..." – Ozan Kilic
2. "I can't believe I'm so stupid as to expose me for this fucking hell..." – Josefin Bergqvist
3. "It's a game. To some it is game over... as simple as that. Pack your bags and go home..." – Gökhan "Gurkan" Gasi
4. "I wouldn't say he's abnormal, but he isn't casted in the "Dalmas-shape" so to speak..." – Anders "Löken" Löfgren
5. "This is a 3-star resort so I enjoy it like a bear in an anthill..." – Peter Janeröd
6. "We feel no sympathy for the other team whatsoever... We don't like them at all!" – Mats Juhlin
7. "I'm no "skogsmulle". I'm no bloody jungle girl. But what the hell, I aren't an idiot just because of that." – Magdalena "Maggie" Divina
8. "Yeah but... How stupid can you be? He's toast..." – Heléne Ekelund
9. "Honestly... That was the dumbest thing we or I have ever done during Robinson" – Mats Juhlin
10. "I've said it a thousand times. Do not betray me or else..." – Heléne Ekelund
11. "You got to have some damn balls... and stand up for your cause..." – Marcus Metsomäki
12. "If I should survive myself, I might have to lie right to someone's face..." – Erik Svedberg
13. "Goooooooooo" – Paolo Roberto

== Voting history ==
	Original Tribes		Episode 3–5 Tribes				Buwanga vs. Kalis					Merged Tribe							
Episode #:	2		3	4	5		6		7	8			9	11		12		13	
Eliminated:	Moa; 4/7 votes	Flavia; 4/7 votes	Gurkan; 4/8 votes^{6}	Löken; 6/8 votes	Kinna; No vote	Elin; 4/7 votes^{4}	Josefin; 7/8 votes	Peter; 6/8 votes	Margareta; 6/7 votes	Maggie^{9} 6/7 votes	Ozan^{9} 4/6 votes	Elin^{9} 8/12 votes	Daniel^{9} 6/11 votes	Mats^{9} 5/10 votes	Marcus; 8/9 votes	Misha; No vote	Tommy^{9} 3/5 votes	Jukka, Kristoffer; No vote	Mats; 7/10 votes
Voter	Vote																		
Erik	Gurkan	Flavia	Gurkan	−			Josefin			Maggie		Mats	Marcus	Mats	Marcus		Tommy		Final Challenge
Heléne	Caged^{1}	Flavia	Gurkan					Peter	Margareta		Marcus	Elin	Daniel	Mats	Marcus		Tommy		Final Challenge
Mats				Löken		Elin		Peter	Margareta		Ozan	Elin	Daniel	Kristoffer					
Jukka				Löken		Elin		Sara	Margareta		Ozan	Elin	Daniel	Kristoffer	Marcus		Erik		Erik
Kristoffer	Not in game		−	−			Josefin			Maggie		Elin	Marcus	Mats	Marcus		Tommy		Mats
Tommy	Not in game		−	−			Josefin			Maggie		Elin^{E}	Kristoffer	Mats	Marcus		Jukka		Mats
Sara				Löken		Margareta		Peter	Margareta		Ozan	Elin	Daniel	Kristoffer	Marcus				Mats
Daniel				−			Josefin			Maggie		Mats	Marcus						Mats
Elin				Misha		Margareta	Josefin			Maggie		Mats							Mats
Misha				Löken		Elin	Josefin			Maggie		Elin	Daniel	Mats^{E}	Marcus				Mats
Marcus				Löken		Elin		Peter	Margareta		Ozan	Elin	Daniel^{E}	Kristoffer	Tommy^{E}				Erik
Ozan	Caged^{1}	Flavia	Gurkan					Peter	Margareta		Marcus								Mats
Maggie	Not in game		−	−			Josefin			Misha									Erik
Margareta	Caged^{1}			Löken		Misha		Peter	Ozan										
Peter	Gurkan	Flavia	Gurkan					Marcus											
Josefin	Moa	−	−	−			Kristoffer												
Kinna	Moa	Peter	Heléne																
Löken				Misha															
Gurkan	Moa	Kinna	Heléne																
Flavia	Moa	Peter																	
Moa	Gurkan																		
