= Expedition Robinson 1998 =

- Season 2
- Presented by: Harald Treutiger
- No. of days: 47
- No. of castaways: 15
- Winner: Alexandra Zazzi
- Runner-up: Birgitta Åberg
- Location: Mataking, Malaysia; Pompom, Malaysia
- No. of episodes: 13

Release
- Original network: SVT1
- Original release: September 12 – November 28, 1998

Additional information
- Filming dates: June 1998 – July 1998

Season chronology
- ← Previous; 1997 Next → 1999

Expedition Robinson 1998 is the second edition of Expedition Robinson to air in Sweden and it aired in 1998.

A major twist this season was that when a tribe lost an immunity challenge, the other tribe would vote out one of their members. Another twist was that of the 'joker', Jochen Schützdeller, who entered the game when the tribes merged. Along with the twists, this season was the first to include an alliance (The Girl Mafia), which would later go on to be a constant factor in later seasons. In the end, it was Alexandra Zazzi who won the season with a 7-2 jury vote over Birgitta Åberg. This season was much more successful than the premiere season, garnering over two million viewers per episode in later parts of the season.

== Finishing order ==
Contestant	Original Tribes	Merged Tribe	Finish
Roger Ohlsson; 40, Kyrkebol	South Team		1st Voted Out; Day 4
Ola Eklund; 34, Höllviken	South Team		2nd Voted Out; Day 8
Torbjörn Ambré; 46, Växjö	North Team		3rd Voted Out; Day 12
Mia Laaksonen; 20, Gothenburg	South Team		4th Voted Out; Day 16
Jochen Schützdeller; 32, Gothenburg		Robinson	5th Voted Out; 1st Jury Member; Day 20
Susanne Rittedal; 27, Stockholm	South Team	Robinson	6th Voted Out; 2nd Jury Member; Day 24
Herman Nikolic; 21, Lund	South Team	Robinson	7th Voted Out; 3rd Jury Member; Day 28
Elizabeth Anderzén; 26, Gothenburg	North Team	Robinson	8th Voted Out; 4th Jury Member; Day 32
Richard Börjesson; 22, Gothenburg	North Team	Robinson	9th Voted Out; 5th Jury Member; Day 36
Magnus Jansson; 27, No Permanent Residence	North Team	Robinson	10th Voted Out; 6th Jury Member; Day 40
Pål Hollender; 29, Gothenburg	North Team	Robinson	11th Voted Out; 7th Jury Member; Day 44
Katarina Johnson; 35, Stockholm	South Team	Robinson	12th Voted Out; 8th Jury Member; Day 45
Sophie Uppvik; 26, Bontofta	North Team	Robinson	13th Voted Out; 9th Jury Member; Day 46
Birgitta Åberg; 52, Sollerön	North Team	Robinson	Runner-Up; Day 47
Alexandra Zazzi; 32, Gothenburg	South Team	Robinson	Sole Survivor; Day 47

== The game ==
Air date	Challenges		Eliminated	Vote	Finish
Air date	Reward	Immunity	Eliminated	Vote	Finish
12 September 1998	South Team^{1}				
12 September 1998	South Team^{1}				
19 September 1998	South Team	North Team	Roger	3-2-1-1	1st Voted Out; Day 4
26 September 1998	South Team	North Team	Ola	6–1	2nd Voted Out; Day 8
3 October 1998	North Team	South Team	Torbjörn	4–1	3rd Voted Out; Day 12
10 October 1998	North Team	North Team	Mia	3-2-1	4th Voted Out; Day 16
17 October 1998	Alexandra; Richard; Susanne (Everyone)				
24 October 1998	Richard; Susanne	Lelle	Jochen	7-3-1	5th Voted Out; 1st Jury Member; Day 20
31 October 1998	Richard	Katarina	Susanne	5–5	6th Voted Out; 2nd Jury Member; Day 24
7 November 1998	Katarina, (Sophie)	Magnus	Herman	5-3-1	7th Voted Out; 3rd Jury Member; Day 28
14 November 1998	Lelle, (Katarina)	Alexandra	Lelle	6–2	8th Voted Out; 4th Jury Member; Day 32
21 November 1998	Richard	Alexandra	Richard	4–3	9th Voted Out; 5th Jury Member; Day 36
28 November 1998	Pål	Pål	Magnus	4–2	10th Voted Out; 6th Jury Member; Day 40

In the case of multiple tribes or castaways who win reward or immunity, they are listed in order of finish, or alphabetically where it was a team effort; where one castaway won and invited others, the invitees are in brackets.

^1 In the first episode there were two reward challenges played. The first challenge was for choice of beach location while the second was for comfort items and snacks.

== Voting history ==
	Original tribes				Merged tribe										
Episode	2	3	4	5	7	8			9	10	11	12	13		
Day	4	8	12	16	20	24			28	32	36	40	44	45	46
Team	South	South	North	South	Robinson	Robinson			Robinson	Robinson	Robinson	Robinson	Robinson	Robinson	Robinson
Eliminated	Roger	Ola	Torbjörn	Mia	Jochen	Tie (Note: The first Tribal Council Vote resulted in a tie. Per the rules, a second vote was held where the castaways involved in the tie would not vote and the remaining castaways could only vote for those who tied.)	Deadlock (Note: After two rounds of voting, Tribal Council remained tied. Per the rules, the non-tied castaways would be eliminated by random draw.)	Susanne	Herman	Elizabeth	Richard	Magnus	Pål	Katarina	Sophie
Votes	3-2-1-1 (Note: As part of the twist this season, the tribe that won immunity voted someone out of the losing tribe.)	6-1	4-1	3-2-1	7-3-1	5-5	4-4	Lottery (Note: Due to a deadlocked tie after two rounds of voting between Elizabeth and Susanne, the tied contestants drew lots to resolve the vote.)	5-3-1	6-2	4-3	4-2	1-0	1-0	None (Note: A challenge took place to determine the final two. Sophie did not win the challenge and was eliminated.)
Voter	Vote														Challenge
Alexandra	None	None	Torbjörn	None	Jochen	Elizabeth	Elizabeth	None	Herman	Elizabeth	Richard	Magnus	None	Katarina	Won
Birgitta	Ola	Ola	None	?	Herman	Elizabeth	Elizabeth	None	Herman	Elizabeth	Richard	Magnus	Pål	None	Won
Sophie	?	Ola	None	?	Jochen	Elizabeth	Elizabeth	None	Elizabeth	Elizabeth	Richard	Magnus	None	None	Lost
Katarina	None	None	Torbjörn	None	Jochen	Susanne	Susanne	None	Elizabeth	Elizabeth	Richard	Magnus	None	None	
Pål	?	Ola	None	Mia	Jochen	Elizabeth	Elizabeth	None	Herman	Elizabeth	Katarina	Katarina	None		
Magnus	Roger	Katarina	None	Katarina	Jochen	Susanne	Susanne	None	Herman	Birgitta	Katarina	Katarina			
Richard	Alexandra	Ola	None	?	Jochen	Susanne	Susanne	None	Herman	Elizabeth	Katarina				
Elizabeth	Susanne	Ola	None	Susanne	Birgitta	Susanne	None	Won	Sophie	Birgitta					
Herman	None	None	Magnus	None	Jochen	Susanne	Susanne	None	Elizabeth						
Susanne	None	None	Torbjörn	None	Herman	Elizabeth	None	Lost							
Jochen					Herman										
Mia	None	None	Torbjörn	None											
Torbjörn	?	Ola	None												
Ola	None	None													
Roger	None														

	Jury vote	
Episode	13	
Day	47	
Finalist	Alexandra	Birgitta
Votes	7-2	
Juror	Votes	
Sophie	Yes	
Katarina	Yes	
Pål	Yes	
Magnus	Yes	
Richard		Yes
Elizabeth	Yes	
Herman		Yes
Susanne	Yes	
Jochen	Yes	
