= Tengah Island =

Island in Malaysia

Native name: Pulau Tengah, ڤولاو تڠه
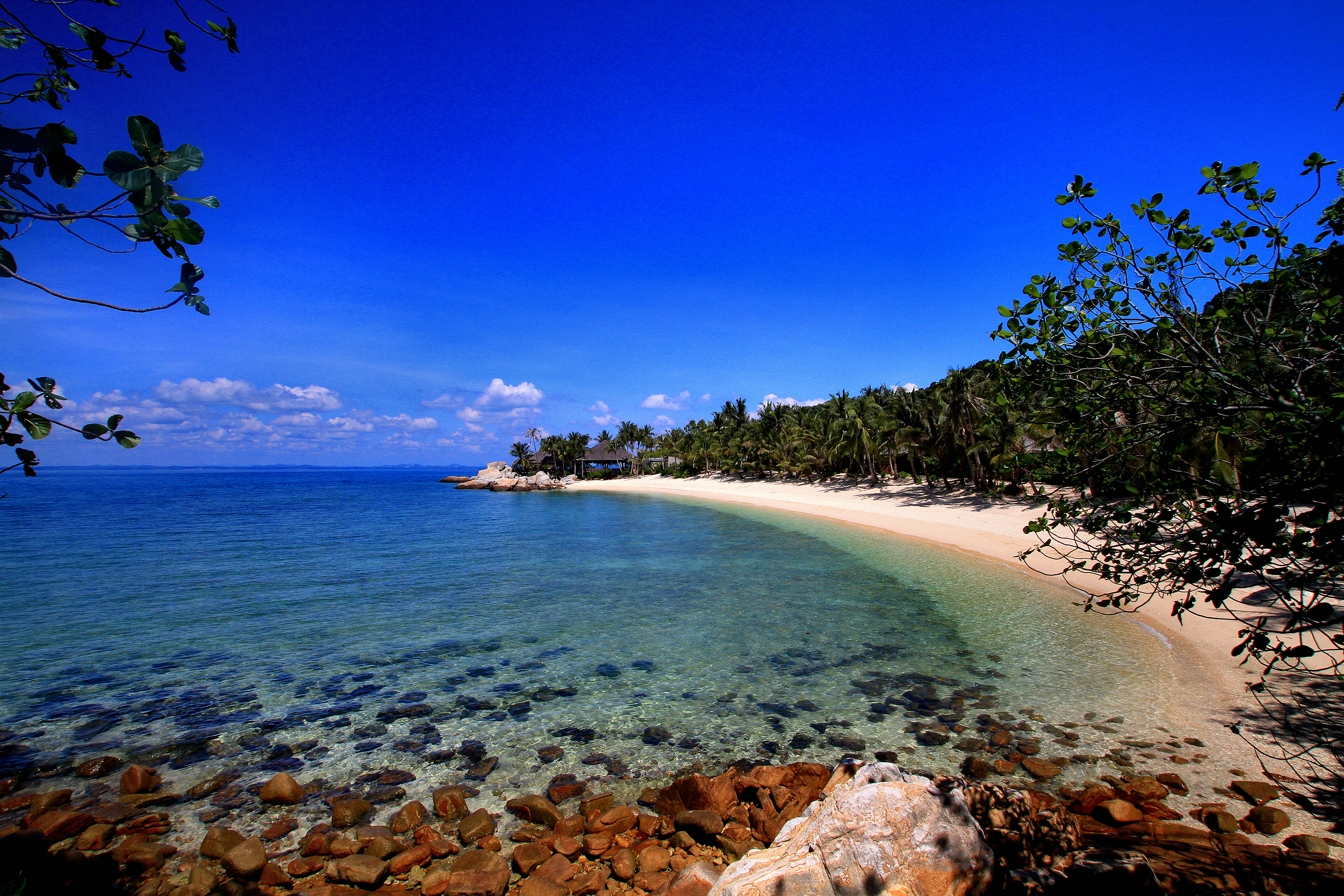
- Tengah Island beach
- Interactive map of Tengah Island

Geography
- Location: South China Sea
- Coordinates: 2°28′37″N 103°57′37″E
- Archipelago: Babi Islands
- Area: 0.54 km^{2} (0.21 sq mi)

Administration
- Malaysia
- State: Johor
- District: Mersing
- Mukim: Babi Islands

Additional information
- Time zone: MST (UTC+08:00)
- Postal code: 86800

Tengah Island (Malay: Pulau Tengah), also known as Babi Tengah Island (Malay: Pulau Babi Tengah), is a privately owned island in the Mersing District of Johor, Malaysia, located approximately nine nautical miles off the coast of Mersing in the South China Sea. The island covers an area of about 0.54 km^{2}

In the 1970s the island was a transit camp for Vietnamese refugees fleeing conflict, managed by the United Nations High Commissioner for Refugees (UNHCR). The campsite was closed in the early 1980s.

The Malaysian government nominated Tengah Island as a marine park in 1985, recognising its ecological significance.

Tengah Island is home to the Batu Batu resort, which runs the Turtle Watch Camp, a conservation program that includes educational activities, guided tours, and efforts to protect nesting sites.

In 1997, Tengah Island was selected as a filming location for the TV show Expedition Robinson.

== See also ==
- List of islands of Malaysia
