= Linda Lindorff =

Swedish entertainer (born 1972)

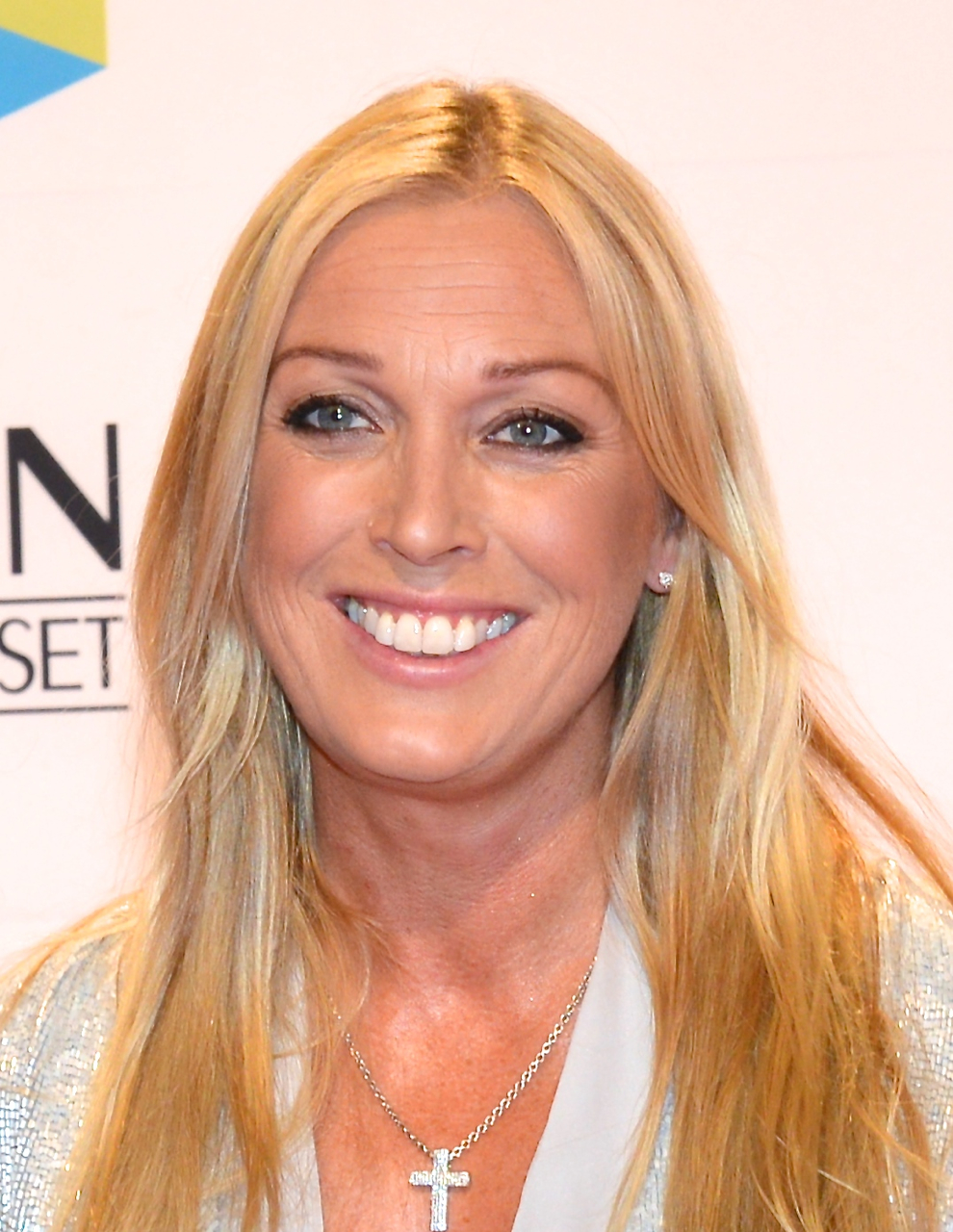
- Lindorff in 2013
- Born: Linda Susanna Isaksson; 9 February 1972 (age 54); Vilhelmina, Sweden
- Occupation: Television presenter
- Known for: Bonde söker fru
- Spouse: Jacob Lindorff (m. 2009)
- Children: 3

Linda Susanna Isaksson Lindorff, née Isaksson (born 9 February 1972) is a Swedish tv host, reporter and beauty pageant titleholder. She was crowned Miss Sweden in 1990 and represented her country at Miss Universe the same year.

Lindorff was a reporter and weather presenter at TV3s News show between 1998 and 2001. Later she became a television presenter for TV4 on the shows När & fjärran, Djur i fara, Robinson 2009 and The Farm. She is currently presenting Bonde söker fru. In 2009, she married the photographer Jacob Lindorff. The couple has three children together. Lindorff participated in Let's Dance 2016 which was broadcast on TV4.
