= Jennifer Egelryd =

Swedish football forward (born 1990)

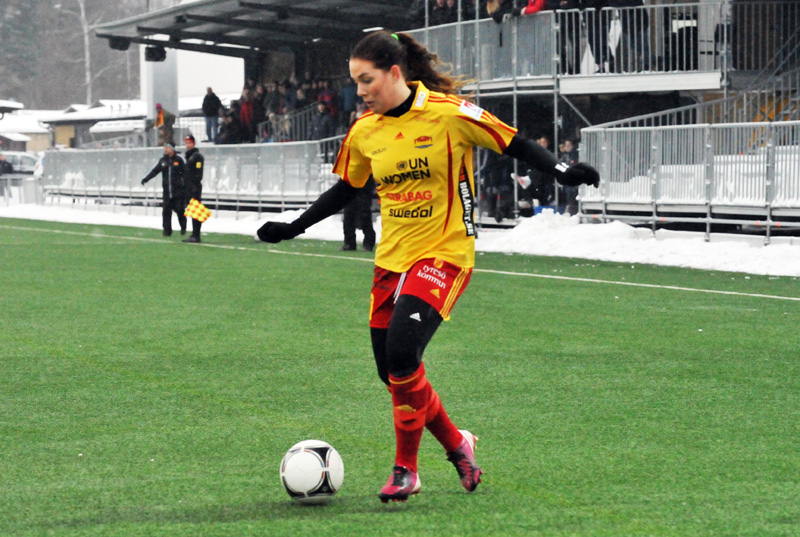
- Playing for Tyresö in February 2013

Personal information
- Full name: Jennifer Egelryd
- Date of birth: 25 July 1990 (age 36)
- Height: 1.68 m (5 ft 6 in)
- Position: Forward

Team information
- Current team: AIK
- Number: 4

Senior career*
Years	Team	Apps	(Gls)
2009–2014	Tyresö FF	42	(5)
2012	→ Åland United (loan)	4	(4)
2013	→ IK Sirius (loan)	8	(3)
2014–2015	Piteå IF	16	(0)
2015–	AIK	7	(0)
- * Club domestic league appearances and goals as of 08:13, 1 August 2015 (UTC)

Jennifer Egelryd (born 25 July 1990) is a Swedish football forward who currently plays in the Damallsvenskan for AIK. She previously played for Piteå IF and Tyresö FF, from where she was loaned to Åland United of the Naisten Liiga and IK Sirius of the Elitettan.

== Early life ==
Egelryd began playing football at the age of five where she played for Tyresö's youngest girls' team.

== Playing career ==
=== Club ===
Egelryd made her debut for Tyresö FF at the age of 19 in a match against Djurgården in April 2010. She scored her first goal for the club in May during a match against AIK, in which Tyresö won 2-0. She finished the 2010 season having played in 19 matches, with 13 starts and 3 goals. After returning to Tyresö for the 2011 Damallsvenskan season, she made 6 starts in 13 appearances for a total of 546 minutes played. She scored two goals: one during a match against Jitex on 1 May in which Tyresö won 2-1 and another during a 3-0 win against Djurgården on 5 June.

In 2012, Egelryd made one appearance Tyresö and signed on loan with Finnish club, Åland United. She made four appearances for Åland and scored four goals. She returned for the remainder of the 2012 Damallsvenskan season to Tyresö where she made 29 appearances with two starts.

Egelryd returned to Tyresö for the 2013 season and made six appearances with one start before being signed on loan to IK Sirius FK in the Elitettan. In November 2013 Egelryd agreed to sign for Tyresö's Damallsvenskan rivals Piteå IF.

=== International ===
Egelryd represented Sweden at various youth levels including U-19, U-20 and U-23. In 2009, she helped Sweden win silver at the 2009 UEFA Women's U-19 Championship.
