= Robinson 2009 =

- Season 10
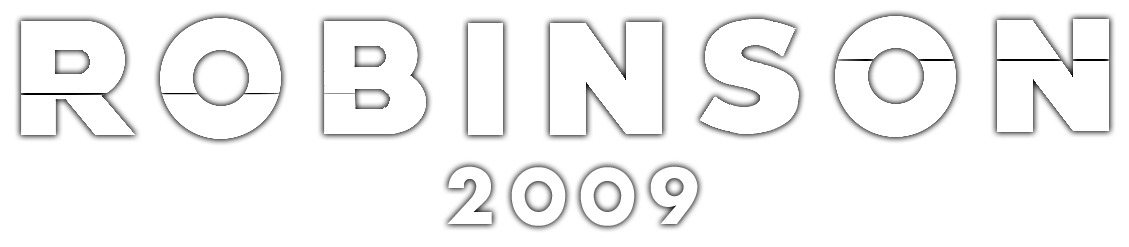
- Presented by: Linda Isacsson
- No. of days: 38
- No. of castaways: 18
- Winner: Ellenor Pierre
- Runner-up: Jarmo Heinonen
- Location: El Nido, Palawan, Philippines
- No. of episodes: 11

Release
- Original network: TV4
- Original release: 21 March – 30 May 2009

Season chronology
- ← Previous; 2005 Next → Karibien

Robinson: 2009 is the tenth version of Expedition Robinson (now shortened to Robinson) to air in Sweden and it premiered on 21 March 2009 on the Swedish television channel TV4. It was the first season of the show to air since the show's initial cancellation in 2005.

As a twist this season there were initially no tribes, instead contestants had to earn a spot on a tribe by surviving a challenge and the first tribal council. Another twist was that some of the contestants would have to compete in duels in order to avoid elimination. Ellenor Pierre eventually went on to win the season with a jury vote of 4–3 over Jarmo Heinonen.

== Finishing order ==
Contestant	Original Tribes	Merged Tribe	Finish
Kerstin Fröblom; 60, Täby			Lost Challenge; Day 3
Michel Berendji; 39, Stockholm			1st Voted Out; Day 4
Beatrice Karlsson; 37, Arvidsjaur	Magkal		2nd Voted Out; Day 8
Erika Killén; 28, Borås	Parangan		3rd Voted Out; Day 11
Josefine Myrén; 38, Hägersten	Parangan		Left Competition; Day 13
Mika Svensson; 26, Stockholm	Parangan		4th Voted Out; Day 14
Erik Rydberg; 23, Åkersberga	Parangan		5th Voted Out; Day 18
Jarmo Heinonen; Returned to the game	Magkal		6th Voted Out; Day 19; Won Duel; Day 20
Erik Billing; 28, Malmö	Parangan		Lost Duel; Day 20
Rafael Ortega; 44, Malmö	Magkal	Robinson	7th Voted Out; 1st Jury Member; Day 22
Christian Ternstedt; 28, Bankeryd	Magkal	Robinson	Ejected; Day 23
Ranjit Roy; 31, Hjärup	Magkal	Robinson	8th Voted Out; 2nd Jury Member; Day 25
Angela Monroe; 31, Stockholm	Parangan	Robinson	9th Voted Out; 3rd Jury Member; Day 28
Lukas Berglund; 29, Lidingö	Magkal	Robinson	10th Voted Out; 4th Jury Member; Day 31
Erik Blomqvist; 29, Ramkvilla	Parangan	Robinson	11th Voted Out; 5th Jury Member; Day 35
Nina Amjadi; 22, Järfälla	Magkal	Robinson	Lost Challenge; 6th Jury Member; Day 38
Anna Lundh; 21, Mora	Parangan	Robinson	Lost Challenge; 7th Jury Member; Day 38
Jarmo Heinonen; 54, Vaxholm	Magkal	Robinson	Runner-Up; Day 38
Ellenor Pierre; 35, Gävle	Magkal	Robinson	Sole Survivor; Day 38

== Voting history ==
	Pre-Tribes		Original Tribes								Merged Tribe								
Episode #:	1		2	3	4		5	6				7		8	9	10	11		
Eliminated:	Kerstin; No vote	Michel; 12/17 votes	Beatrice; 6/8 votes	Erika; 7/8 votes	Josefine; No vote	Mika; 5/6 votes	Erik R 4/5 votes	Erik Bi; 3/4 votes^{1}	Jarmo; 6/7 votes^{1}	Erik Bi; No vote	Rafael; 5/9 votes^{2}	Christian; No vote	Ranjit; 5/7 votes^{2}	Angela; 6/7 votes	Lukas; 4/6 votes	Erik Bl; 3/3 votes^{3}	Nina; Anna; No vote	Jarmo; 3/7 votes	Ellenor; 4/7 votes
Voter	Vote																		
Ellenor	11th Place	Michel	Beatrice						Jarmo					Angela	Lukas	Erik Bl		Jury Vote	
Jarmo	14th Place	Michel	Christian						Christian	Won	Rafael		Ranjit	Angela	Lukas	Erik Bl		Jury Vote	
Anna	6th Place	Michel		Erika		Mika	Erik R	Erik Bi			Rafael		Ranjit	Angela	Lukas	Erik Bl		Jarmo	
Nina	15th Place	Michel	Beatrice						Jarmo		Rafael		Ranjit	Angela	Lukas			Jarmo	
Erik Bl	8th Place	Michel		Erika		Mika	Erik R	Erik Bi			Rafael		Ranjit	Angela	Nina			Jarmo	
Lukas	1st Place	Erik Bi	Beatrice						Jarmo		Erik Bl		Nina	Angela	Nina				Ellenor
Angela	7th Place	Michel		Erika		Mika	Erik R	Erik Bi			Rafael		Ranjit	Jarmo					Ellenor
Ranjit	3rd Place	Michel	Beatrice						Jarmo		Erik Bl		Nina						Ellenor
Christian	17th Place	Erik Bi	Beatrice						Jarmo		Erik Bl								
Rafael	5th Place	Michel	Beatrice						Jarmo		Erik Bl								Ellenor
Erik Bi	4th Place	Michel		Erika		Mika	Erik R	Anna		Lost									
Erik R	12th Place	Erik Bi		Erika		Mika	Anna												
Mika	13th Place	Erik Bi		Erika		Erik Bi													
Josefine	10th Place	Michel		Erika															
Erika	9th Place	Michel		Erik R															
Beatrice	16th Place	Michel	Christian																
Michel	2nd Place	Erik Bi																	
Kerstin	18th Place																		

^1 In part one of episode six, the tribes were voting for who should take part in the elimination duel.
^2 At both the sixth and seventh tribal councils, Ellenor was not permitted to vote as she had finished last at the immunity challenge.
^3 At the tenth tribal council, Erik Bl and Nina were not permitted and were the only ones eligible to be voted for as the other three contestants had won semi-final challenges.

== Season summary ==
One tribe (Pagang) kept losing and was decimated to three people come merge. On the winning tribe (Makal), four men formed an alliance. Old man Jarmo was on the outs socially and was not included in the alliance. Knowing that Jarmo would flip, the four-man alliance knew they needed six votes to have majority after the merge. Therefore, they invited the two women of the tribe, Ellenor and Nina. They were rather clear with the women that they were number five and six and would be voted off come final six. Ellenor seemed content with that. Just before the merge, each tribe had to vote for one member to do an elimination duel. Erik and Jarmo faced off in a nine-hour stamina challenge sitting in cages. Erik eventually fell asleep and lost. Jarmo was given an immunity idol which was good for the next tribal council. After the merge, Jarmo allied with the three remaining members of the losing tribe, as expected, but that still left them in minority: The three from old Pagang + Jarmo vs the four men from Makal + Ellenor + Nina. However, Ellenor finished last in the first individual immunity challenge and therefore lost her vote at the first tribal council. Jarmo then showed Nina his immunity idol to sway her. Nina knew she was on the bottom of the alliance and unlike Ellenor, she was not content with finishing 6th, so she took the opportunity and flipped. Therefore, the four-man alliance was eliminated one by one. Ellenor, also part of that alliance, was next in line. She had finished last in every individual immunity challenge so no one saw her as a threat, even though every jury member would likely vote for her since she had remained loyal to them. The final spots were decided by challenges and Ellenor won both rounds. Jarmo won the last challenge but he stood no chance against Ellenor with a jury of her former allies. The vote ended 4–3.
