= Paolo Roberto =

Swedish boxer (born 1969)

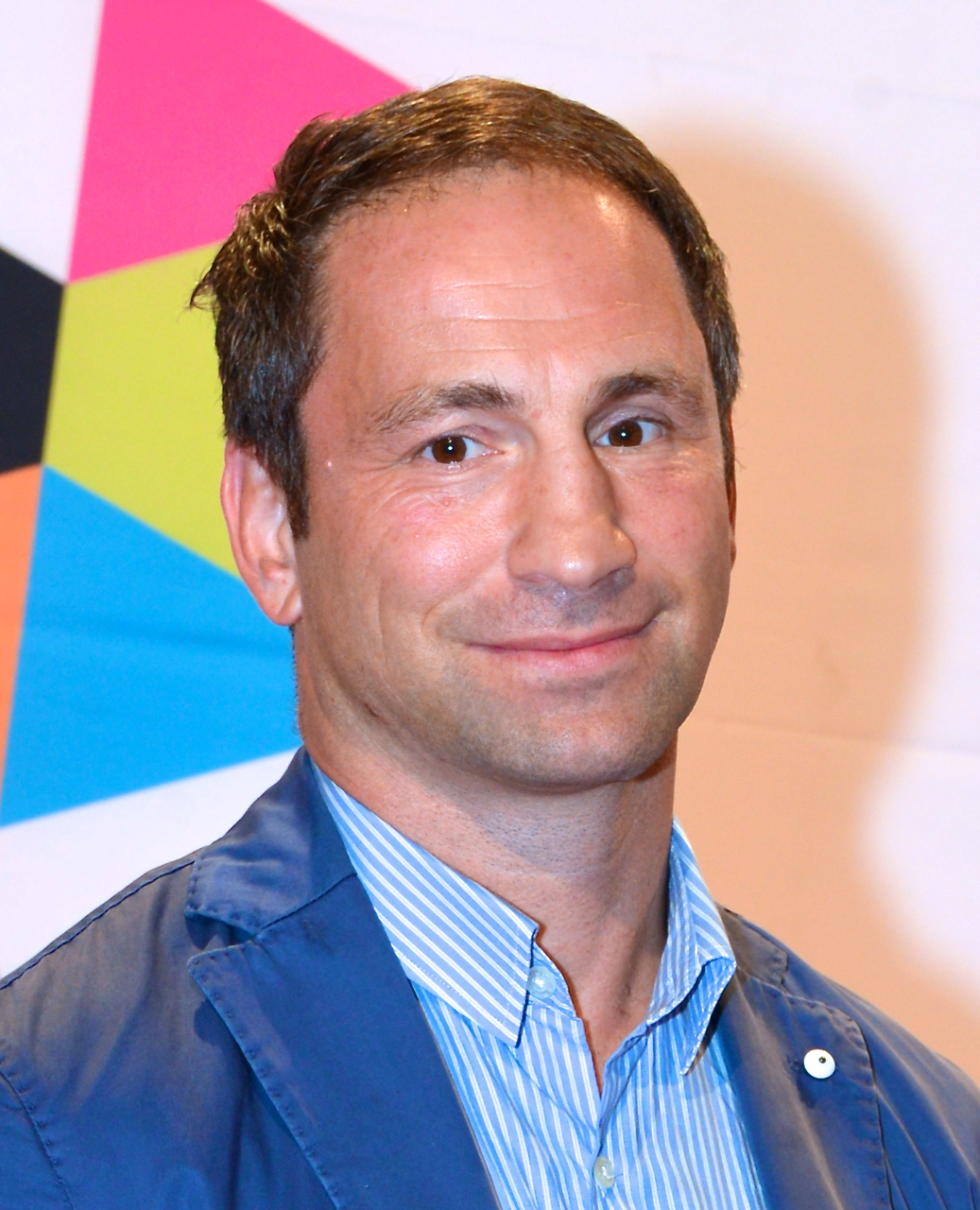
- Roberto in 2013

Personal information
- Born: Paolo Antonio Roberto; 3 February 1969 (age 57) Stockholm, Sweden
- Weight: Welterweight

Boxing career
- Stance: Southpaw

Boxing record
- Total fights: 33
- Wins: 28
- Win by KO: 13
- Losses: 4
- Draws: 1
- No contests: 0

Paolo Roberto (born 3 February 1969) is a Swedish actor, television presenter, restauranteur and ex-boxer of partial Italian descent. During his boxing career, he held several titles. He has starred in several movies and hosted several television programs, including as host of the cooking show Primo Paolo. His acting debut was in Stockholmsnatt, where he starred himself in a dramatization of his early life.

== Boxing career ==
Roberto was born in Upplands Väsby, Stockholms län. He started to compete professionally at the age of 24, but had earlier competed in kickboxing where he became Swedish champion, and before that Taekwondo where he became Nordic champion and repeated Swedish champion. He was known for fighting a lot in the street.

He started off his career with four consecutive victories before running into trouble. After fighting a six-round draw against Roy Dehara, he came back to the ring to be stopped in the second round against John Duckworth. His coach said in a post fight interview that Paolo refused to give up and that's probably why the referee stopped the fight. When asked about the incident, Paolo simply said if he would give up in a street fight he would die. After his first loss, he won 15 straight fights before taking on the WBC light middleweight champion Javier Castillejo to whom he lost in the fifth round by referee stoppage. Roberto was behind on all scorecards at the time the fight was stopped.

Roberto then moved up in weight to challenge fellow countryman Armand Krajnc for his WBO middle weight title. In between those fights, he had four wins. In the fight against Krajnc, Roberto had the champion rocking on his feet in the opening round. A right hook stunned his opponent and he had to cover up against the ropes. Then later on in the fight, Krajnc finally figured out his opponent and outboxed the smaller challenger.

Roberto then went back to his original weight class welterweight where after three fights, he won the vacant WBC International Welterweight title against Raul Eduardo Bejarano. He then vacated his belt to fight for the WBO Inter-Continental welterweight title against Wayne Martell. Roberto dominated the fight and was winning when in the tenth round Martell's cut above his eye had gotten so bad the ring doctor decided he had had enough. In his first defense of his WBO title, Roberto got knocked out in the second round against Sebastian Andres Lujan. He never fought professionally again.

All of Roberto's boxing matches took place outside of Sweden, including his championship fights, which were held in Åland, because pro boxing has been banned in Sweden since 1969. The ban was lifted in 2007

== Outside boxing ==
He was a participant in the first season of Let's Dance, the Swedish version of Dancing with the Stars.

He married Lena Arrelöv on 31 December 2003. The couple have one son, Enzo Antonio Roberto, born in 2004, and one daughter, Elisa Roberto, born in 2007. Roberto and Arrelöv divorced in 2012. His early life is dramatized in the 1987 Swedish movie Stockholmsnatt. He is featured in some chapters of Stieg Larsson's The Girl Who Played with Fire and played himself in the film based on the book.

Roberto has also talked openly of his conversion experience, which happened on a visit to St. Peter's in Rome. Wishing to approach the image of St. Michael the Archangel (the great "fighter" of the Heavenly Host), he was told he was not allowed in that roped off area. He asked, "Well, why can those people go in?" "They are going to confession," the guard replied. He thought of the empty life he had lived to his present, and told the guard, "Well, I'm going to confession, too." After over an hour with the priest, he said he felt renewed. The girl he had travelled to Rome with is now his wife, Lena Arrelöv. Roberto recounted this episode of his life to Marcus Grodi on the "Journey Home" show of EWTN.

== Scandals ==
In 2017, Roberto was criticized in the press for allegedly making sexist jokes on social media, one of which was in connection with Metoo. After criticism from, among others, Gudrun Schyman, Roberto defended himself with the fact that it was a joke and sexually-abusive acts are truly terrible.

In May 2020, he was arrested on suspicion of buying sex from a young woman from another European country. The strike was made in an apartment in central Stockholm in a police operation. Roberto confirmed the sex purchase during a television interview. In connection, he was dismissed from his program manager assignments on TV4 and dropped by the company representing his selling of Italian Food range Paolos.

== Professional boxing record ==
Professional record breakdown
33 matches	28 wins	4 losses
By knockout	13	3
By decision	15	1
Draws	1	

Result	Record	Opponent	Method	Stadium	Date	Round	Time	Location	Notes
Loss	28–4–1	(Argentina) Sebastián Andrés Luján	KO	Baltic Hall, Mariehamn, Finland	4 October 2003	2	1:22	Mariehamn, Finland	Loses WBO Inter-Continental welterweight title
Win	28–3–1	(United States) Wayne Martell	TKO (cuts)	Kisahalli, Helsinki, Finland	2 February 2003	10	1:52	Helsinki, Finland	Wins WBO Inter-Continental welterweight title
Win	27–3–1	(Argentina) Raul Eduardo Bejarano	UD	Finland	16 November 2002	12	3:00	Helsinki, Finland	Wins WBC International welterweight title
Win	26–3–1	(France) David Sarraille	TKO	Denmark, Odense Congress Center	30 August 2002	2	2:02	Odense, Denmark	
Win	25–3–1	(Hungary) Gyorgy Bugyik	TKO	Gubbio, Umbria, Italy	6 June 2002	2	1:59	Gubbio, Italy	
Win	24–3–1	(Canada) Ron Pasek	KO	Cirkusbygningen, Copenhagen, Denmark	6 April 2002	3	2:45	Copenhagen, Denmark	
Loss	23–3–1	(Sweden) Armand Krajnc	UD	Hansehalle, Lübeck, Schleswig-Holstein, Germany	13 November 2001	12	3:00	Lübeck, Germany	For WBO middleweight title
Win	23–2–1	(Brazil) Luiz Augusto Dos Santos	MD	Kisstadion, Budapest, Hungary	6 June 2001	8	3:00	Budapest, Hungary	
Win	22–2–1	(Panama) Edwin Murillo	KO	Estrel Convention Center, Neukölln, Berlin, Germany	10 October 2000	1	0:50	Berlin, Germany	
Win	21–2–1	(United States) Anthony Ivory	UD	FTC Stadium, Budapest, Hungary	28 August 2000	8	3:00	Budapest, Hungary	
Win	20–2–1	(United States) Henry Hughes	TKO	Preussag Arena, Hannover, Niedersachsen, Germany	4 June 2000	2	1:51	Hannover, Germany	
Loss	19–2–1	(Spain) Javier Castillejo	TKO	Pabellon Europa, Leganes, Comunidad de Madrid, Spain	19 September 1999	7	1:47	Madrid, Spain	For WBC light middleweight title
Win	19–1–1	(Bulgaria) Stefan Dimitrov	TKO	Plaza de Toros La Cubierta, Leganes, Comunidad de Madrid, Spain	14 April 1999	6	0:32	Madrid, Spain	
Win	18–1–1	(Mexico) Jesús Mayorga	UD	Thomas & Mack Center, Las Vegas, Nevada, United States	13 Feb 1999	8	3:00	(United States) Las Vegas, USA	
Win	17–1–1	(United Kingdom) David Baptiste	TKO	Everton Park Sports Centre, Liverpool, Merseyside, England	19 December 1998	6	2:51	(United Kingdom) Liverpool, England	
Win	16–1–1	(Bulgaria) Djemal Mehmedov	TKO	York, Yorkshire, England	26 September 1998	4	2:48	(United Kingdom) York, England	
Win	15–1–1	(Italy) Armando Briganti	SD	Pesaro, Marche, Italy	29 May 1998	8	3:00	Pesaro, Italy	
Win	14–1–1	(United States) Darryl Ruffin	UD	Ballys Park Place Hotel Casino, Atlantic City, New Jersey, United States	28 February 1998	8	3:00	(United States) New Jersey, USA	
Win	13–1–1	(United Kingdom) Darren Covill	PTS	Lee Valley Leisure Centre, Picketts Lock, London, England	31 January 1998	6	3:00	(United Kingdom) London, England	
Win	12–1–1	(Ukraine) Viktor Fesechko	PTS	Alexandra Pavilion, Muswell Hill, London, England	14 October 1997	8	3:00	(United Kingdom) London, England	
Win	11–1–1	(United Kingdom) Danny Quacoe	PTS	San Gennaro Vesuviano, Campania, Italy	9 August 1997	8	3:00	San Gennaro Vesuviano, Italy	
Win	10–1–1	(United Kingdom) Steve Goodwin	PTS	Kelvin Hall, Glasgow, Scotland	5 July 1997	6	3:00	(United Kingdom) Glasgow, Scotland	
Win	9–1–1	(United Kingdom) Paul King	PTS	Brondby hallen, Copenhagen, Denmark	24 January 1997	6	3:00	Copenhagen, Denmark	
Win	8–1–1	(Morocco) Habib Ben Salah	TKO	Le Caire, Alpes-de-Haute-Provence, France	19 September 1996	5	2:02	Le Caire, France	
Win	7–1–1	(Slovakia) Josef Presinsky	UD	Walsleben, Brandenburg, Germany	16 June 1996	6	3:00	Brandenburg, Germany	
Win	6–1–1	(United Kingdom) Carl Winston	PTS	Elephant & Castle Centre, Southwark, London, England	29 November 1995	4	3:00	(United Kingdom) London, England	
Win	5–1–1	(United Kingdom) Ernie Loveridge	PTS	Town Hall, Battersea, London, England	21 September 1995	4	3:00	(United Kingdom) London, England	
Loss	4 – 1 – 1	(United Kingdom) Dusty Miller	TKO	York Hall, Bethnal Green, London, England	27 April 1995	2	2:28	(United Kingdom) London, England	
Draw	4–0–1	(United Kingdom) John Duckworth	PTS	Piccadilly, London, England	7 November 1994	6	3:00	(United Kingdom) London, England	
Win	4–0	(United Kingdom) Roy Dehara	KO	York Hall, Bethnal Green, London, England	29 September 1994	1	2:00	(United Kingdom) London, England	
Win	3–0	(United Kingdom) John Hughes	TKO	Tooting, London, England	2 June 1994	1	0:21	(United Kingdom) London, England	
Win	2–0	(Hungary) Zoltan Dano	PTS	Budapest, Hungary	27 February 1994	4	3:00	Budapest, Hungary	
Win	1–0	(Hungary) Laszlo Molnar	TKO	Turku, Finland	18 December 1993	2	1:21	Turku, Finland	

== Minor titles held ==
Preceded by Vacant	WBC International welterweight title 16 November 2002 – 2 February 2003; Vacates	Succeeded by Alpaslan Aguzum
Preceded by Vacant	WBO Inter-Continental welterweight title 2 February 2003 – 4 October 2003	Succeeded by Sebastián Andrés Luján
