= List of Eurovision Song Contest presenters =

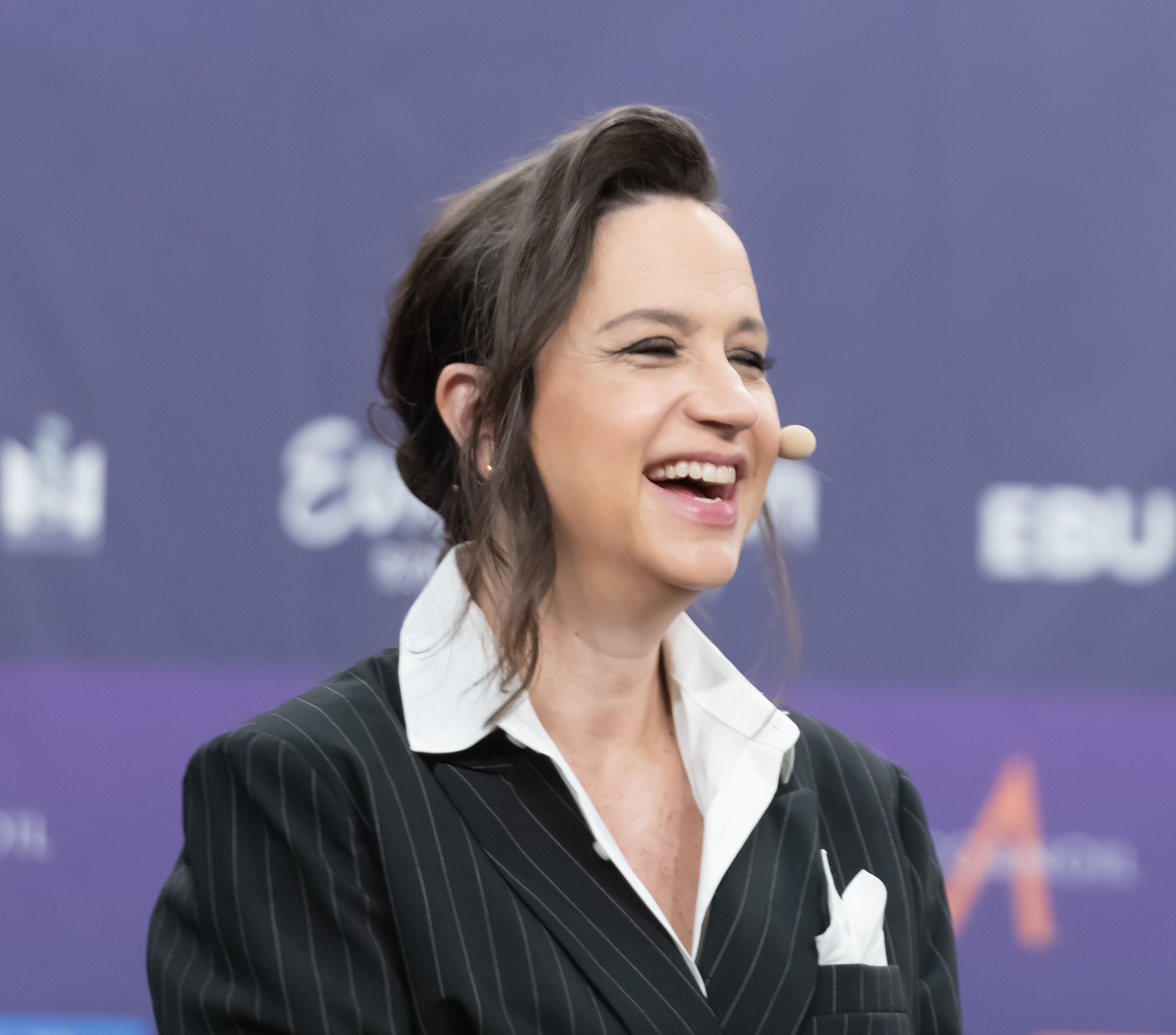
Petra Mede, presenter of the 2013, 2016 and 2024 contests

The Eurovision Song Contest is an annual international song competition, held every year by the European Broadcasting Union (EBU) since 1956. This page is a list of people who have acted as presenters of the contest.

Since 1988, it has been the norm to have at least two presenters for the contest. All contests before 1978, while only three after 1988 (i.e. the 1993, 1995 and 2013 contests), have had one presenter. The 1999 contest was the first to feature three presenters, a method that has been used most often since 2010. The contests from 2018 to 2021 all had four presenters each.

Katie Boyle holds the record for the highest number of contests hosted, with four editions (in 1960, 1963, 1968 and 1974), followed by Petra Mede with three editions (2013, 2016 and 2024) and a special (Eurovision Song Contest's Greatest Hits in 2015); including the semi-finals, Mede is to date the person who has hosted the most Eurovision broadcasts, with ten. The only other person to have hosted the contest more than once is Jacqueline Joubert (1959 and 1961).

== Presenters ==
◇ Contest cancelled

Year	Presenter(s)	Ref
1956	Lohengrin Filipello	
1957	Anaid Iplicjian	
1958	Hannie Lips	
1959	Jacqueline Joubert	
1960	Katie Boyle	
1961	Jacqueline Joubert	
1962	Mireille Delannoy	
1963	Katie Boyle	
1964	Lotte Wæver	
1965	Renata Mauro	
1966	Josiane Shen	
1967	Erica Vaal	
1968	Katie Boyle	
1969	Laurita Valenzuela	
1970	Willy Dobbe	
1971	Bernadette Ní Ghallchóir	
1972	Moira Shearer	
1973	Helga Guitton	
1974	Katie Boyle	
1975	Karin Falck	
1976	Corry Brokken	
1977	Angela Rippon	
1978	Denise Fabre and Léon Zitrone	
1979	Yardena Arazi and Daniel Pe'er	
1980	Marlous Fluitsma	
1981	Doireann Ní Bhriain	
1982	Jan Leeming	
1983	Marlene Charell	
1984	Désirée Nosbusch	
1985	Lill Lindfors	
1986	Åse Kleveland	
1987	Viktor Lazlo	
1988	Michelle Rocca and Pat Kenny	
1989	Lolita Morena and Jacques Deschenaux	
1990	Helga Vlahović and Oliver Mlakar	
1991	Gigliola Cinquetti and Toto Cutugno	
1992	Lydia Capolicchio and Harald Treutiger	
1993	Fionnuala Sweeney	
1994	Cynthia Ní Mhurchú and Gerry Ryan	
1995	Mary Kennedy	
1996	Ingvild Bryn and Morten Harket	
1997	Carrie Crowley and Ronan Keating	
1998	Ulrika Jonsson and Terry Wogan	
1999	Dafna Dekel, Sigal Shachmon and Yigal Ravid	
2000	Kattis Ahlström and Anders Lundin	
2001	Natasja Crone Back and Søren Pilmark	
2002	Annely Peebo and Marko Matvere	
2003	Marie N and Renārs Kaupers	
2004	Meltem Cumbul and Korhan Abay	
2005	Maria Efrosinina and Pavlo Shylko	
2006	Maria Menounos and Sakis Rouvas	
2007	Jaana Pelkonen and Mikko Leppilampi	
2008	Jovana Janković and Željko Joksimović	
2009	Natalia Vodianova and Andrey Malahov (semi-finals); Alsou and Ivan Urgant (final)	
2010	Nadia Hasnaoui, Haddy N'jie and Erik Solbakken	
2011	Anke Engelke, Judith Rakers and Stefan Raab	
2012	Leyla Aliyeva, Nargiz Birk-Petersen and Eldar Gasimov	
2013	Petra Mede	
2014	Lise Rønne, Nikolaj Koppel and Pilou Asbæk	
2015	Mirjam Weichselbraun, Alice Tumler, Arabella Kiesbauer and Conchita Wurst	
2016	Petra Mede and Måns Zelmerlöw	
2017	Oleksandr Skichko, Volodymyr Ostapchuk and Timur Miroshnychenko	
2018	Sílvia Alberto, Daniela Ruah, Catarina Furtado and Filomena Cautela	
2019	Bar Refaeli, Erez Tal, Assi Azar and Lucy Ayoub	
2020	Chantal Janzen, Edsilia Rombley and Jan Smit ◇	
2021	Chantal Janzen, Edsilia Rombley, Jan Smit and Nikkie de Jager	
2022	Alessandro Cattelan, Laura Pausini and Mika	
2023	Alesha Dixon, Hannah Waddingham, Julia Sanina (all shows) and Graham Norton (final)	
2024	Petra Mede and Malin Åkerman	
2025	Hazel Brugger, Sandra Studer (all shows) and Michelle Hunziker (final)	
2026	Victoria Swarovski and Michael Ostrowski	

=== Green room hosts ===
Year	Presenter(s)	Ref
1976	Hans van Willigenburg	
1980	Hans van Willigenburg	
2002	Tiina Kimmel and Kirke Ert	
2003	Ilze Jaunalksne and Dīvs Reiznieks	
2004	Sertab Erener (final)	
2005	Ruslana and Wladimir Klitschko (final)	
2007	Krisse Salminen (final)	
2008	Kristina Radenković and Branislav Katić	
2009	Dmitry Shepelev	
2013	Eric Saade (final)	
2015	Conchita Wurst	
2017	Timur Miroshnychenko	
2018	Filomena Cautela	
2026	Emily Busvine	

=== Online host ===
Year	Presenter(s)	Ref
2020	Nikkie de Jager ◇	
2021	Nikkie de Jager	

=== Special events ===
Year	Event	Presenter(s)	Ref
1981	Songs of Europe	Rolf Kirkvaag and Titten Tei	
1993	Kvalifikacija za Millstreet	Tajda Lekše	
2005	Congratulations: 50 Years of the Eurovision Song Contest	Katrina Leskanich and Renārs Kaupers	
2015	Eurovision Song Contest's Greatest Hits	Petra Mede and Graham Norton	
2020	Eurovision: Europe Shine a Light	Chantal Janzen, Edsilia Rombley and Jan Smit	

== Presenters born outside the host country ==
- Katie Boyle, born in Florence, Italy, to an Italian-Russian father and a British-Australian mother
- Mireille Delannoy, born in France
- Helga Guitton, born in Königsberg, East Prussia, Germany (now Kaliningrad, Russia)
- Léon Zitrone, born in Petrograd, Russian Empire (now Saint Petersburg, Russia)
- Lill Lindfors, born in Helsinki, Finland
- Åse Kleveland, born in Stockholm, Sweden, to a Norwegian father and a Swedish mother
- Viktor Lazlo, born in Lorient, France
- Fionnuala Sweeney, born in Belfast, United Kingdom
- Ulrika Jonsson, born in Sollentuna, Sweden
- Terry Wogan, born in Limerick, Ireland
- Maria Menounos, born in Medford, Massachusetts, United States, to Greek parents
- Nadia Hasnaoui, born in Morocco to a Moroccan father and a Norwegian mother
- Anke Engelke, born in Montréal, Quebec, Canada, to German parents
- Katrina Leskanich, born in Topeka, Kansas, United States
- Graham Norton, born in Clondalkin, Ireland
- Daniela Ruah, born in Boston, Massachusetts, United States, to Portuguese parents
- Mika, born in Beirut, Lebanon
- Julia Sanina, born in Kyiv, Ukrainian SSR, Soviet Union (now Ukraine)
- Hazel Brugger, born in San Diego, California, United States, to a Swiss father and a German mother

== Presenters who had formerly competed at Eurovision ==
- Corry Brokken, winner for the Netherlands in 1957, also represented the country in 1956 and 1958
- Yardena Arazi, represented Israel in 1976 as part of Chocolate, Menta, Mastik and in 1988
- Lill Lindfors, represented Sweden in 1966 alongside Svante Thuresson
- Åse Kleveland, represented Norway in 1966
- Gigliola Cinquetti, winner for Italy in 1964 and runner-up in 1974
- Toto Cutugno, winner for Italy in 1990
- Dafna Dekel, represented Israel in 1992
- Katrina Leskanich, winner for the United Kingdom in 1997 as part of Katrina and the Waves
- Renārs Kaupers, represented Latvia in 2000 as part of Brainstorm
- Marie N, winner for Latvia in 2002
- Sakis Rouvas, represented Greece in 2004 and in 2009
- Željko Joksimović, represented Serbia and Montenegro in 2004 alongside the Ad Hoc Orchestra, and Serbia in 2012
- Alsou, represented Russia in 2000
- Stefan Raab, represented Germany in 2000
- Eldar Gasimov, winner for Azerbaijan in 2011
- Måns Zelmerlöw, winner for Sweden in 2015
- Edsilia Rombley, represented the Netherlands in 1998 and in 2007
- Sandra Studer, represented Switzerland in 1991

== Presenters who resigned ==
- Chaim Topol (1979)
- Rene Medvešek and Dubravka Marković (1990)
- Ruslana, winner of the 2004 contest (2005)
- Yana Churikova (2009)

== Presenters' costume designers ==
Year	Costume designers	Ref.
1969	Carmen Mir	
1984	Thomas Heurich	
1985	Christer Lindarw	
1987	Thierry Mugler	
2001	Isabell Kristensen	
2002	Aarne Niit and Katrin Kuldma	
2004	Bahar Korçan	
2007	Erika Turunen	
2013	Jean-Paul Gaultier	
2014	Ole Yde	
2015	Ariane Rhomberg	
2016	Lars Wallin, Ida Lanto and Valerie Aflalo	
2017	Luvi, Indposhiv, Lake Studio and Burenina	
2019	Alon Livne, Galia Lahav, Vivi Bellaish, Inbal Dror and Dana Harel	
2020	Diek Pothoven ◇	
2021	Diek Pothoven	
2022	Pierpaolo Piccioli, Alberta Ferretti, Rebecca Baglini, Alessandro Vigilante, Giorgio Armani and Donatella Versace	
2025	Kevin Germanier	

== Running order and allocation draw presenters ==
Prior to each year's contest, a series of draws have been held to determine differing facets of the contest's production, which typically are presided over by one or more presenters. Historically, a random drawing of lots was held prior to each year's contest to determine the order in which participating countries would perform in the final, and since 2004 in the semi-finals; this was abolished in 2013, when the running order began to be determined by the contest producers.

A semi-final allocation draw has been held since 2008, to determine which countries perform in which of the two semi-finals, as well as in which semi-final the automatic finalists have voting rights. The semi-finalist countries are divided into pots based on historical voting patterns, and countries in each pot are then split equally between the two semi-finals. During this draw, the countries are also assigned to perform in either the first or second half of the show; the exact running order is then determined at a later date.

Year	Presenter(s)	Ref
1973	Jacques Harvey and Helga Guitton	
1992	Carola Häggkvist	
1993	Linda Martin and Pat Kenny	
1994	Niamh Kavanagh and Fionnuala Sweeney	
1996	Christian Borch	
1997	Eimear Quinn and Mary Kennedy	
1998	Katrina Leskanich and Terry Wogan	
1999	Meni Pe'er	
2002	Tanel Padar and Dave Benton	
2003	Marie N and Renārs Kaupers	
2004	Meltem Cumbul and Korhan Abay	
2005	Pavlo Shylko and Wladimir Klitschko	
2006	Maria Menounos and Sakis Rouvas	
2007	Jaana Pelkonen and Mikko Leppilampi	
2008	Jovana Janković and Željko Joksimović	
2009	Yana Churikova	
2010	Peter Svaar	
2011	Judith Rakers and Sabine Heinrich	
2012	Leyla Aliyeva and Nazim Huseynov	
2013	Pernilla Månsson Colt and Josefine Sundström	
2014	Tine Gøtzsche and Ulla Essendrop	
2015	Kati Bellowitsch and Andi Knoll	
2016	Alexandra Pascalidou and Jovan Radomir	
2017	Timur Miroshnychenko and Nika Konstantinova	
2018	Sílvia Alberto and Filomena Cautela	
2019	Assi Azar and Lucy Ayoub	
2021 (Note: The semi-final allocation draw for the cancelled 2020 contest was retained for the 2021 contest.)	Chantal Janzen, Edsilia Rombley and Jan Smit	
2022	Carolina Di Domenico and Mario Acampa	
2023	AJ Odudu and Rylan Clark	
2024	Pernilla Månsson Colt and Farah Abadi	
2025	Jennifer Bosshard and Jan van Ditzhuijzen	
2026	Alexandra Wachter and Cesár Sampson	

== Opening ceremony presenters ==
Year	Presenter(s)	Ref
2006	Zeta Makrypoulia and Giorgos Kapoutzidis	
2012	Leyla Aliyeva and Nargiz Birk-Petersen	
2013	Pernilla Månsson Colt and Kodjo Akolor	
2014	Bryan Rice, Abdel Aziz Mahmoud, Ulla Essendrop and Peter Falktoft	
2015	Kati Bellowitsch and Andi Knoll	
2016	Jovan Radomir and Catarina Rolfsdotter-Jansson	
2017	Tetyana Terekhova, Slava Varda, Andriy Kishe, Amy Grace, Neyba Traore, Hanna Butkevych and Andriy Dzhedzhula	
2018	Cláudia Semedo, Inês Lopes Goncalves, Pedro Granger and Pedro Penim	
2019	Noa Tishby, Shani Nachshoni, Leon Rosenberg and Nadav Abukasis	
2021	Koos van Plateringen and Fenna Ramos	
2022	Gabriele Corsi, Carolina Di Domenico, Mario Acampa and Laura Carusino	
2023	Timur Miroshnychenko, Sam Quek and Richie Anderson	
2024	Elecktra and Tia Kofi	
2025	Jan van Ditzhuijzen, Tanja Dankner, Odette Hella'Grand and Joël von Mutzenbecher	
2026	Tina Ritschl and Philipp Maschl	

== Press conference moderators ==
Year	Moderator(s)	Ref
2014	Ulla Essendrop and Abdel Aziz Mahmoud	
2015	Katharina Bellowitsch	
2016	Jovan Radomir and Catarina Rolfsdotter	
2017	Nika Konstantinova, Tetyana Terekhova and Ihor Posypayko	
2018	Pedro Granger and Pedro Penim	
2019	Sivan Avrahami and Nadav Ambon	
2021	Koos van Plateringen, Hila Noorzai and Samya Hafsaoui	
2022	Carolina Di Domenico, Mario Acampa and Laura Carusino	
2023	Timur Miroshnychenko, Jermaine Foster and Mariia Vynogradova	
2024	Jovan Radomir	
2025	Sven Epiney	
2026	Emily Busvine	

== Gallery ==
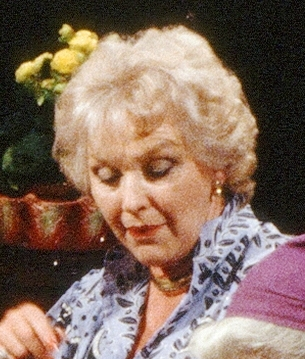
1960, 1963, 1968 and 1974 hostess: Katie Boyle

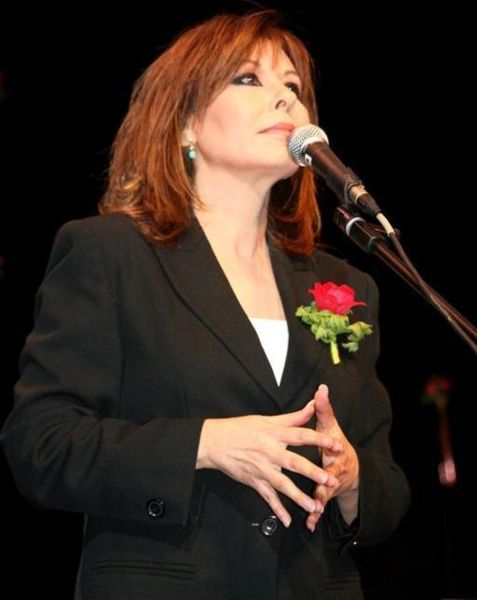
1979 hostess: Yardena Arazi

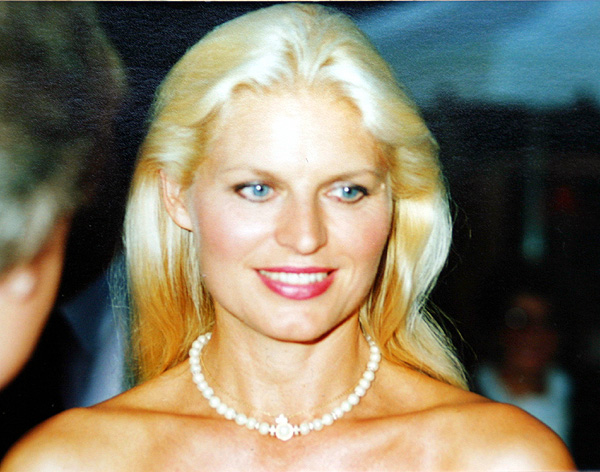
1983 hostess: Marlene Charell

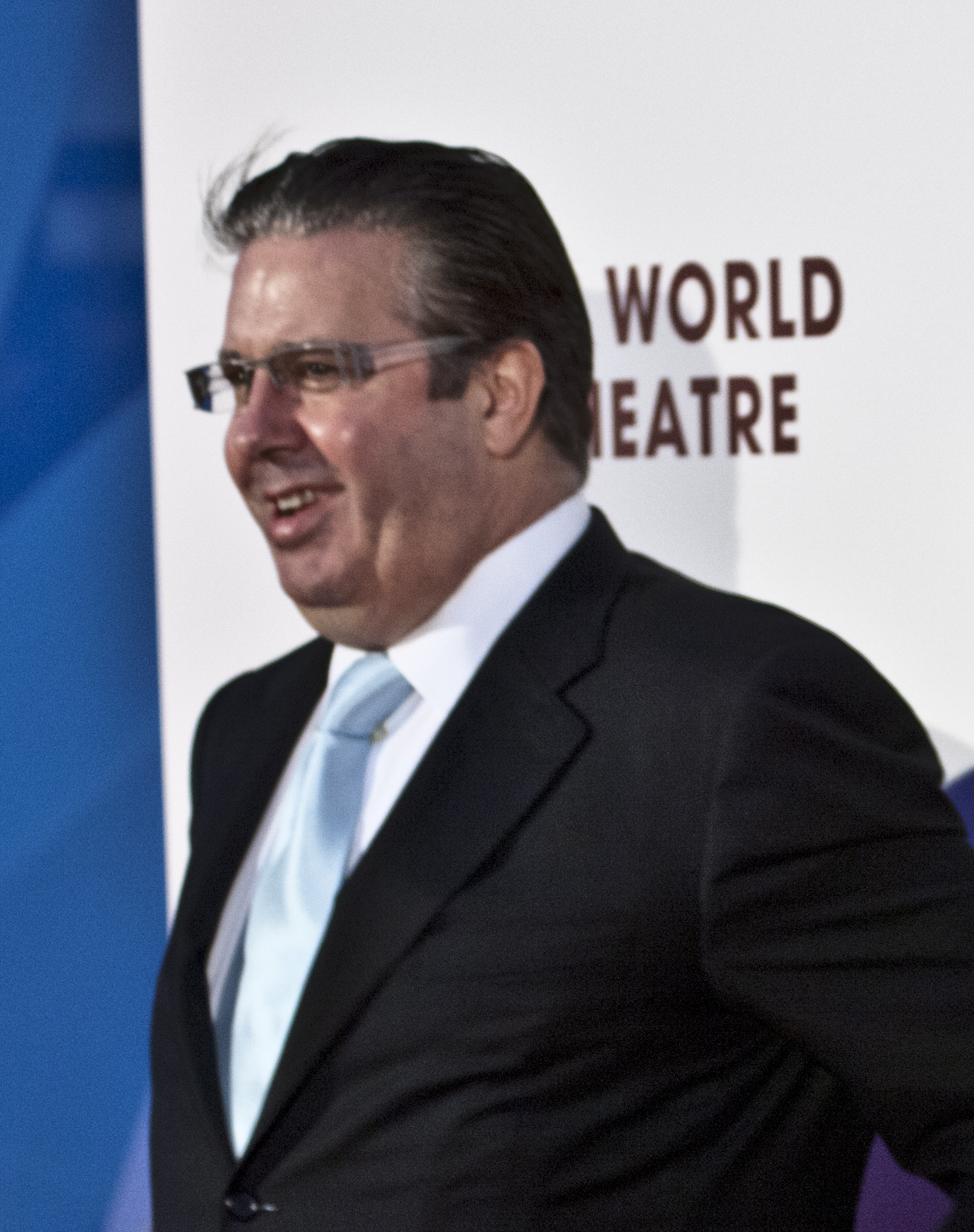
1994 host: Gerry Ryan, pictured in March 2010, one month before his death

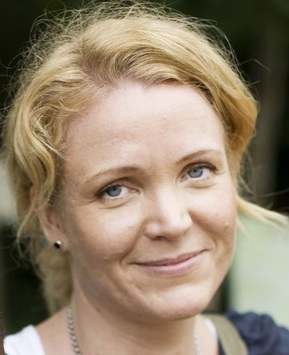
2000 hostess: Kattis Ahlström

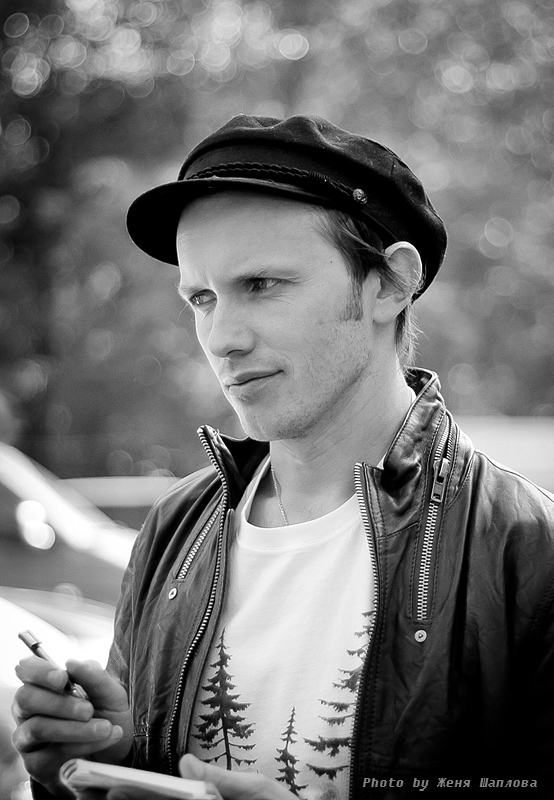
2003 host: Renārs Kaupers

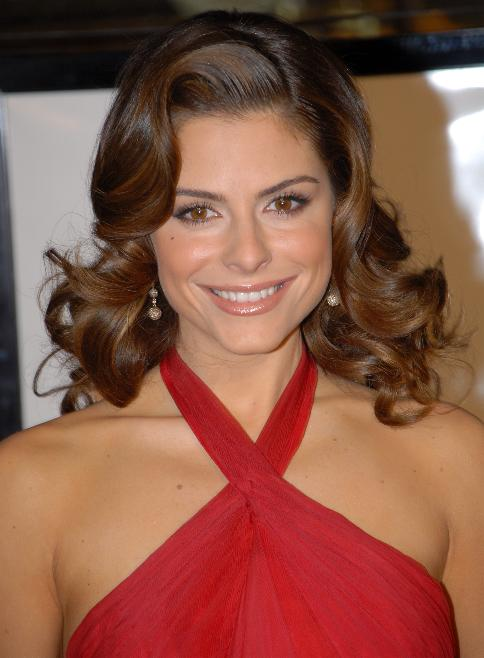
2006 hostess: Maria Menounos

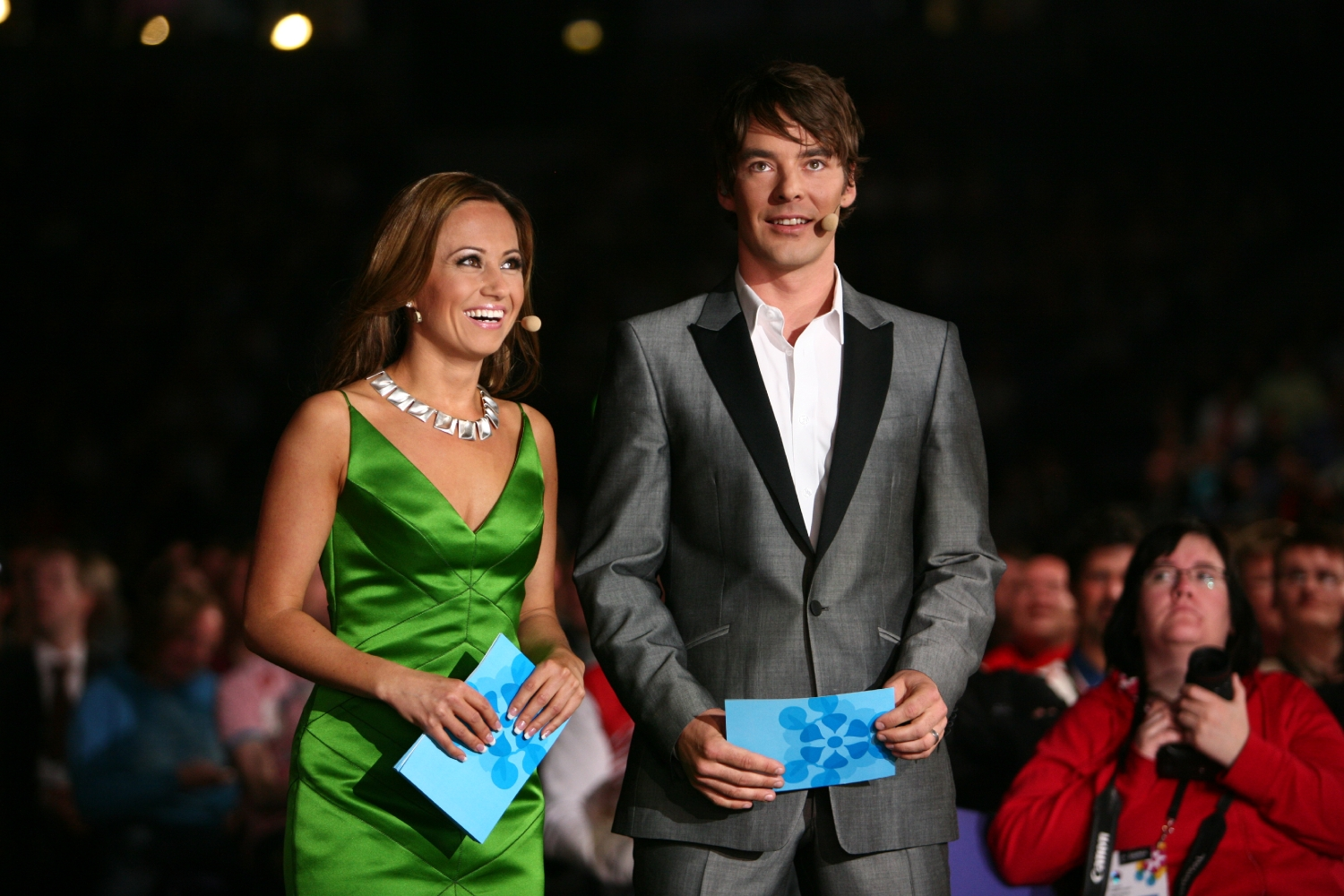
2007 hosts: Jaana Pelkonen and Mikko Leppilampi

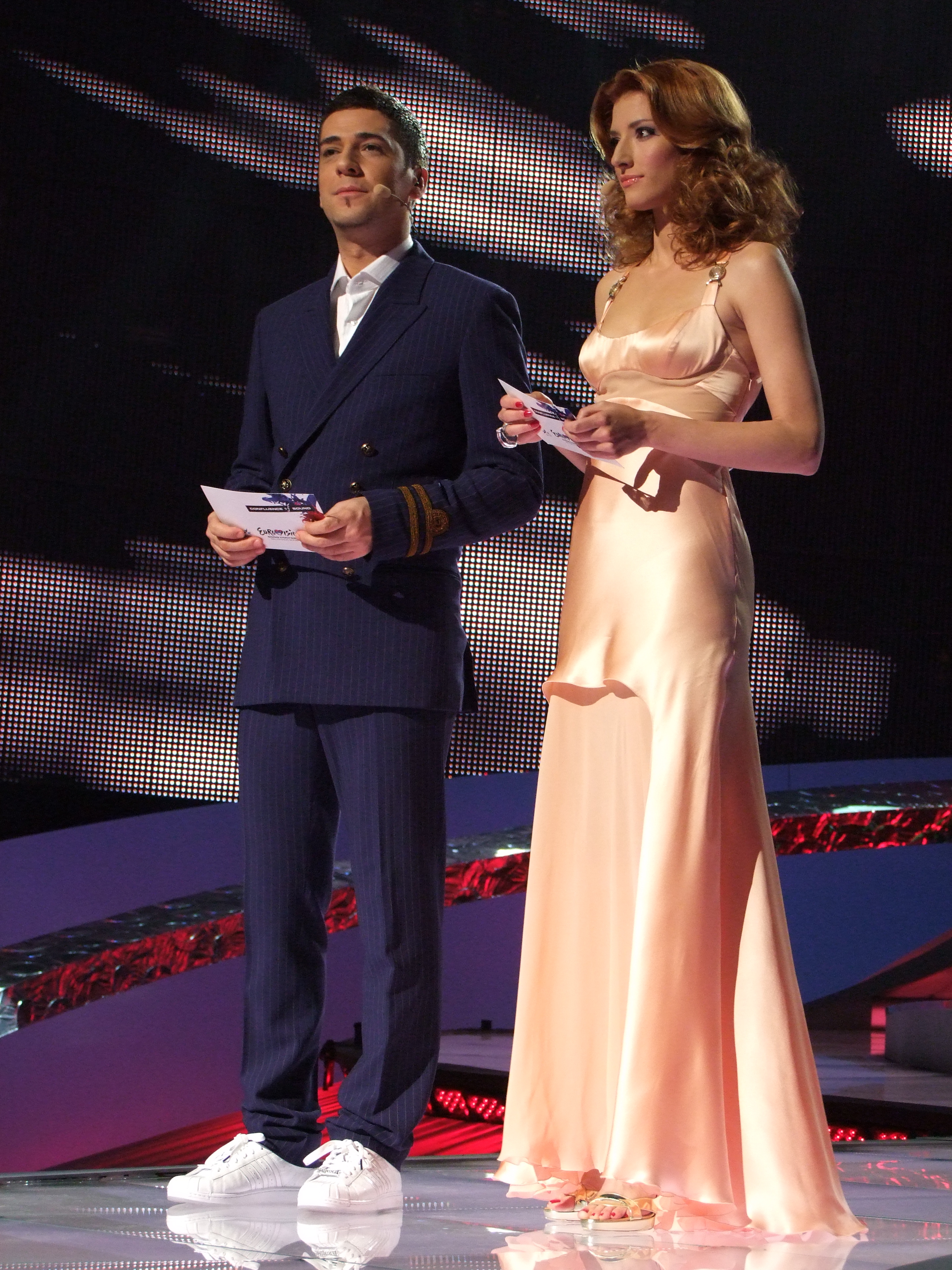
2008 hosts: Jovana Janković and Željko Joksimović

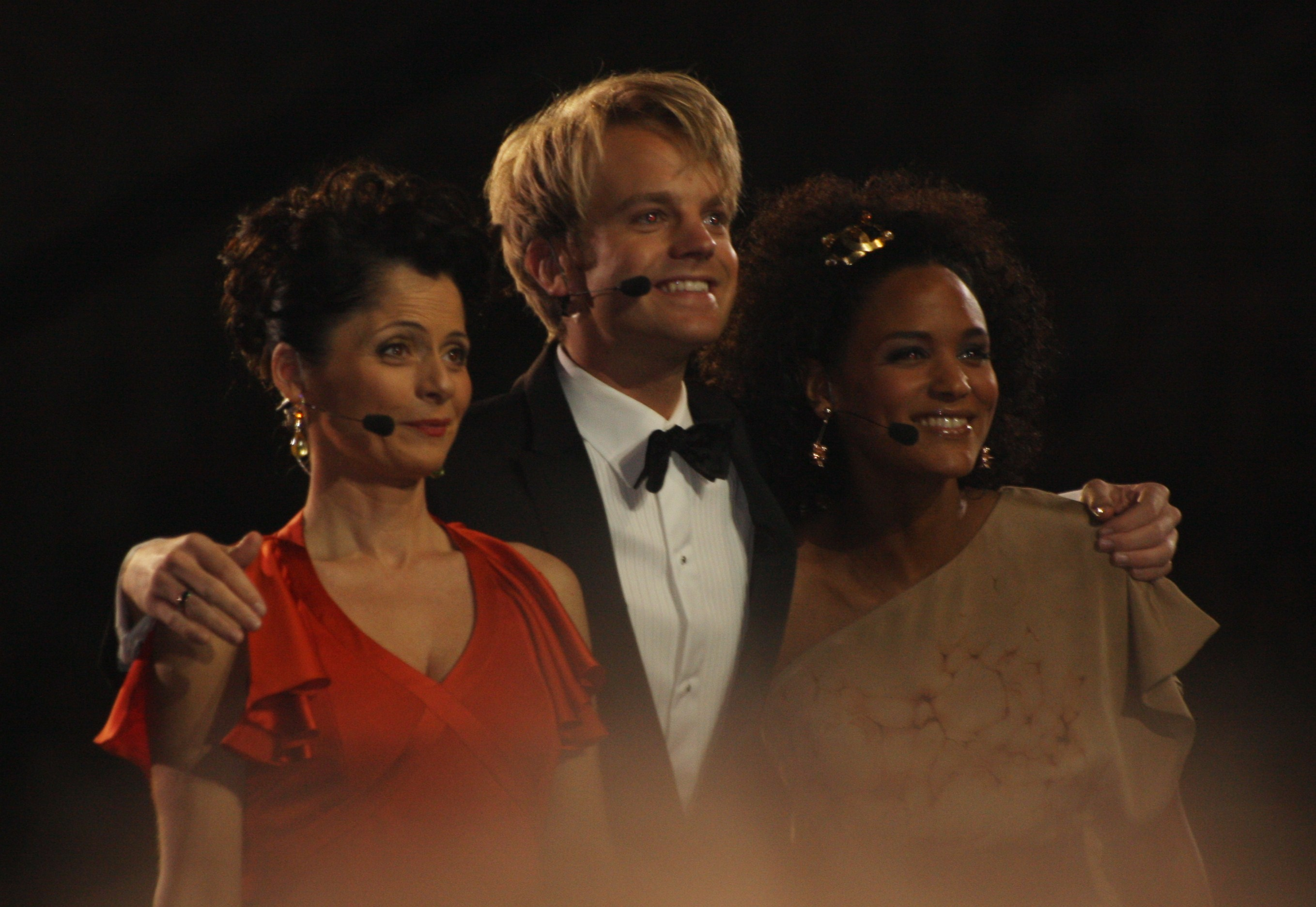
2010 hosts: Nadia Hasnaoui, Erik Solbakken and Haddy Jatou N'jie

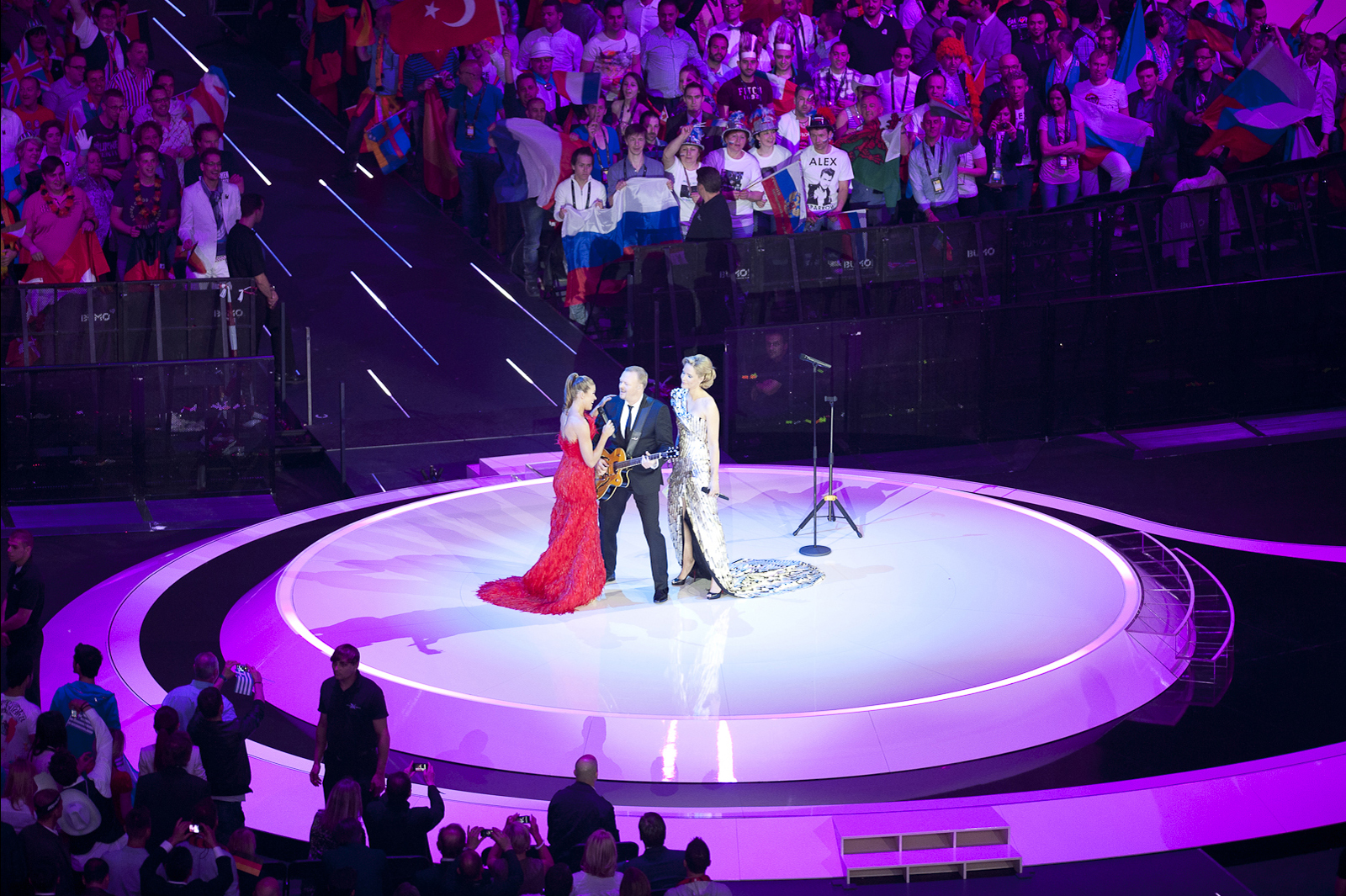
2011 hosts: Anke Engelke, Stefan Raab and Judith Rakers

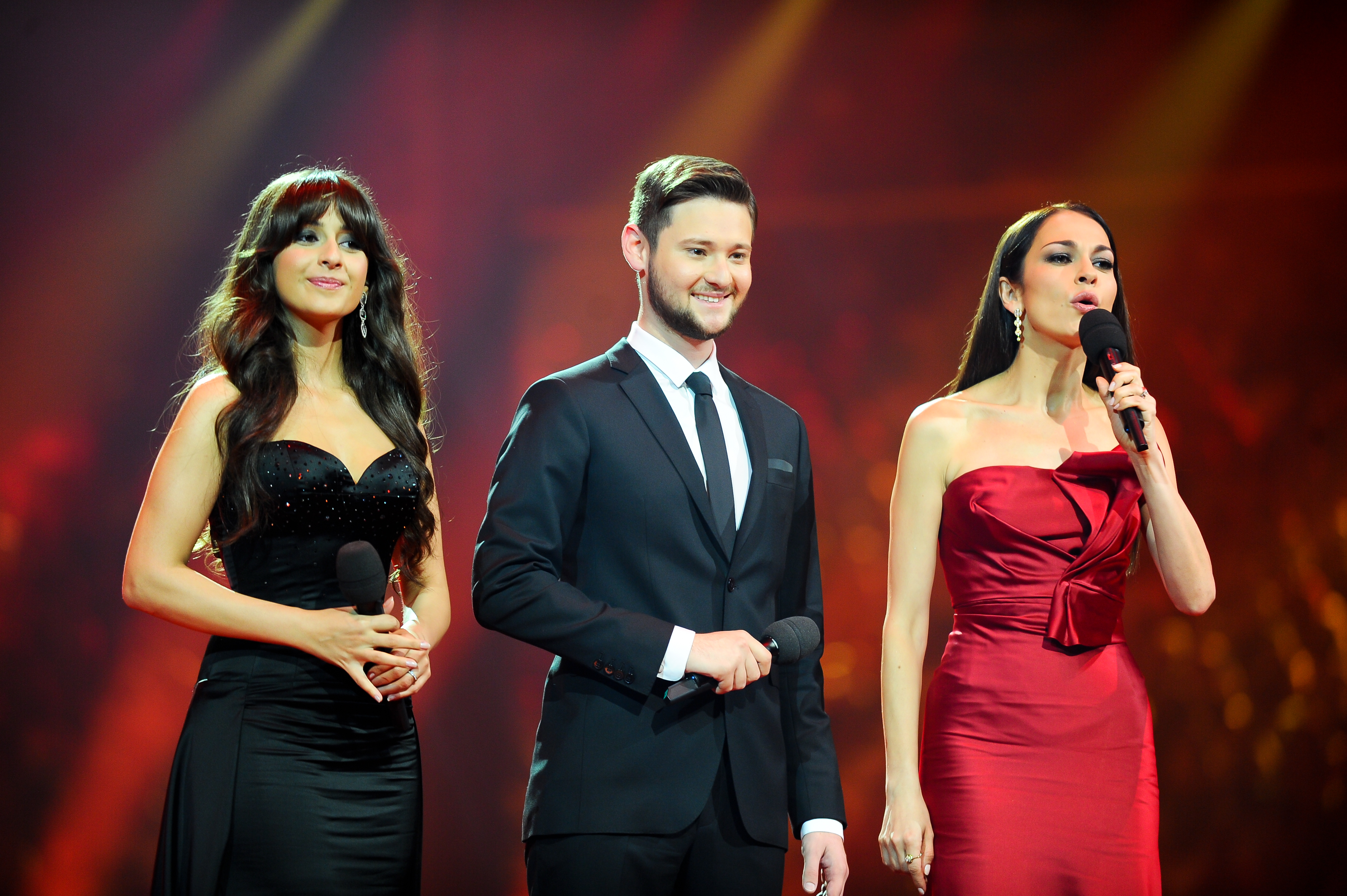
2012 hosts: Leyla Aliyeva, Eldar Gasimov and Nargiz Birk-Petersen

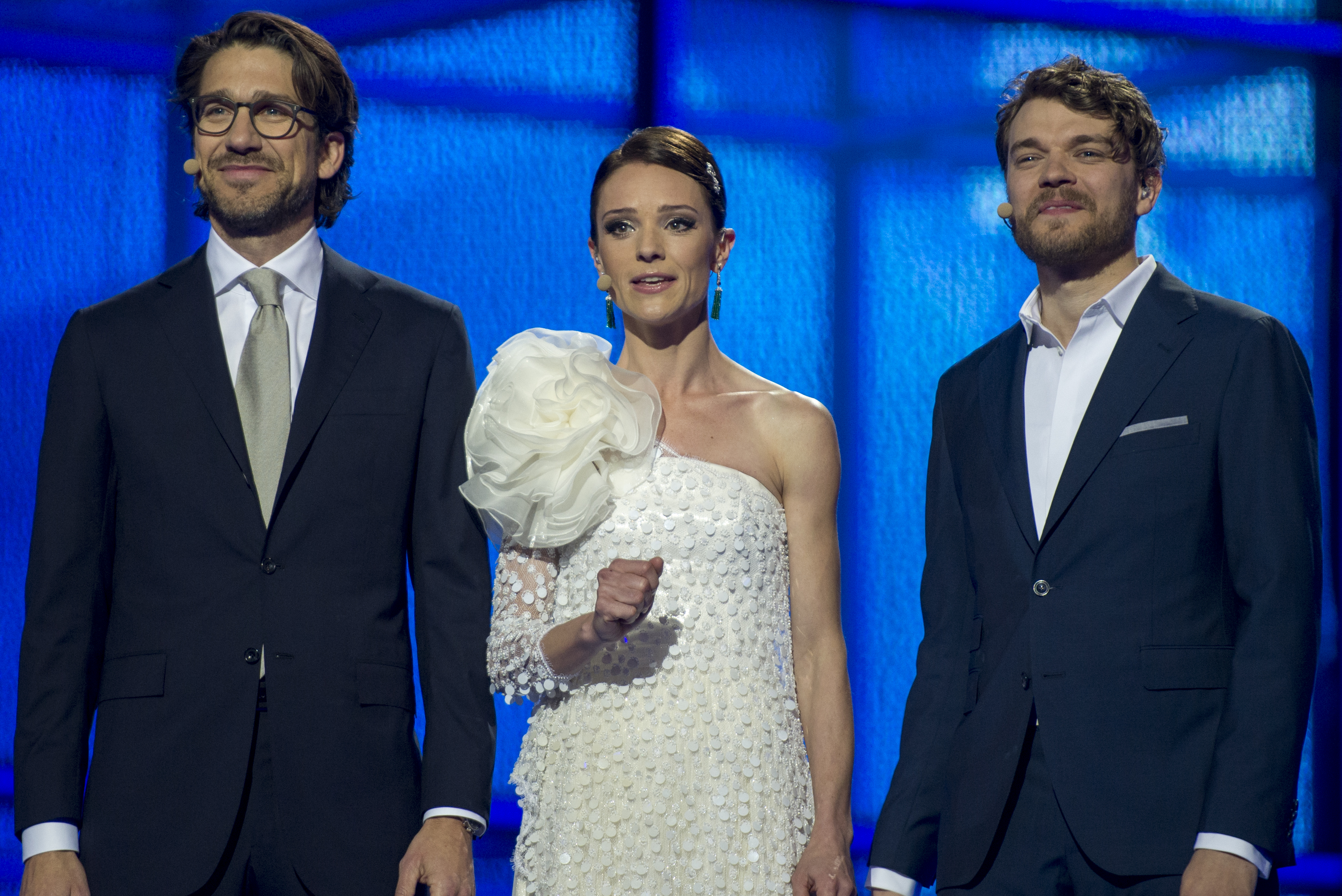
2014 hosts: Nikolaj Koppel, Lise Rønne and Pilou Asbæk

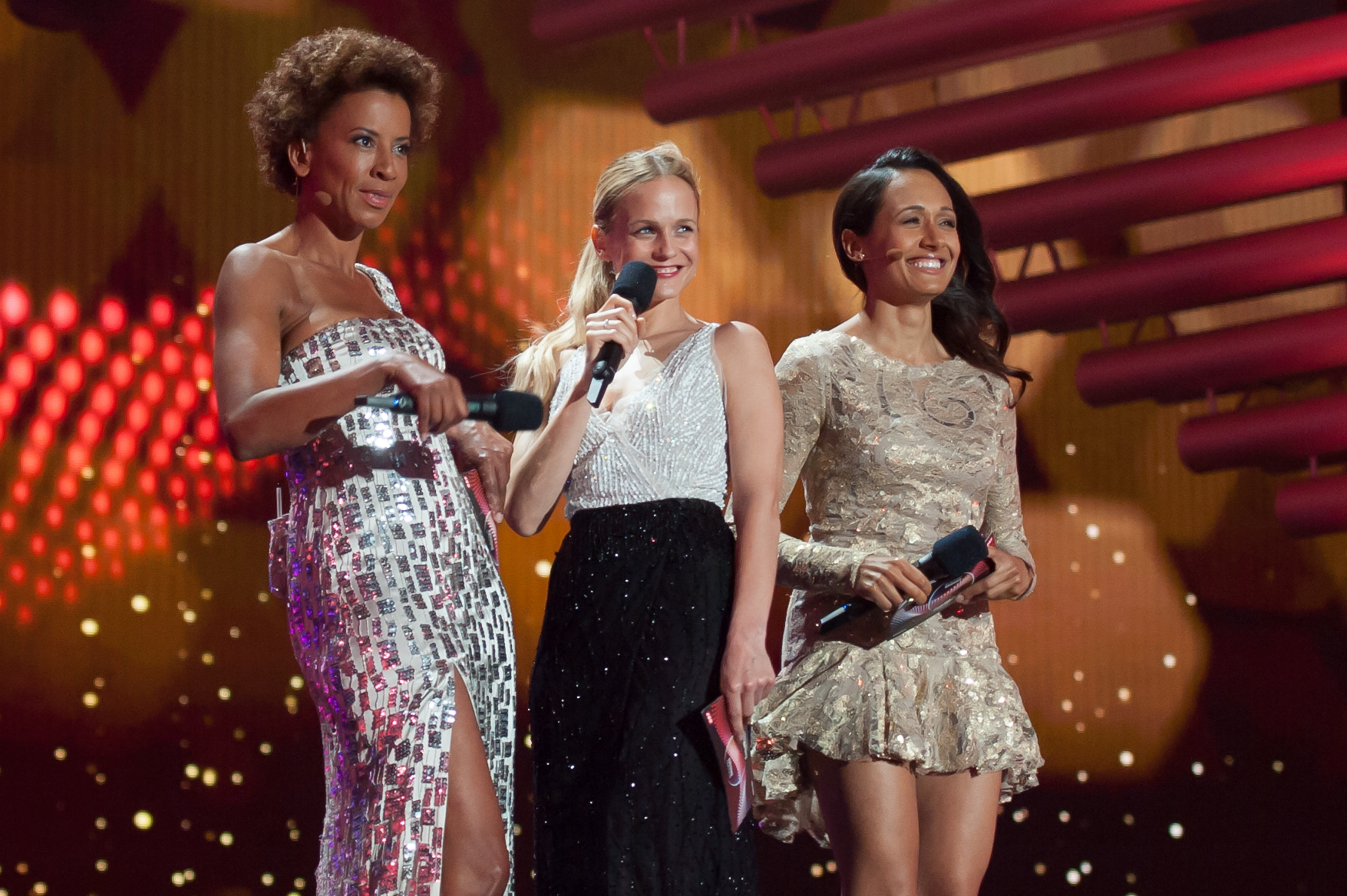
2015 hosts: Alice Tumler, Mirjam Weichselbraun and Arabella Kiesbauer

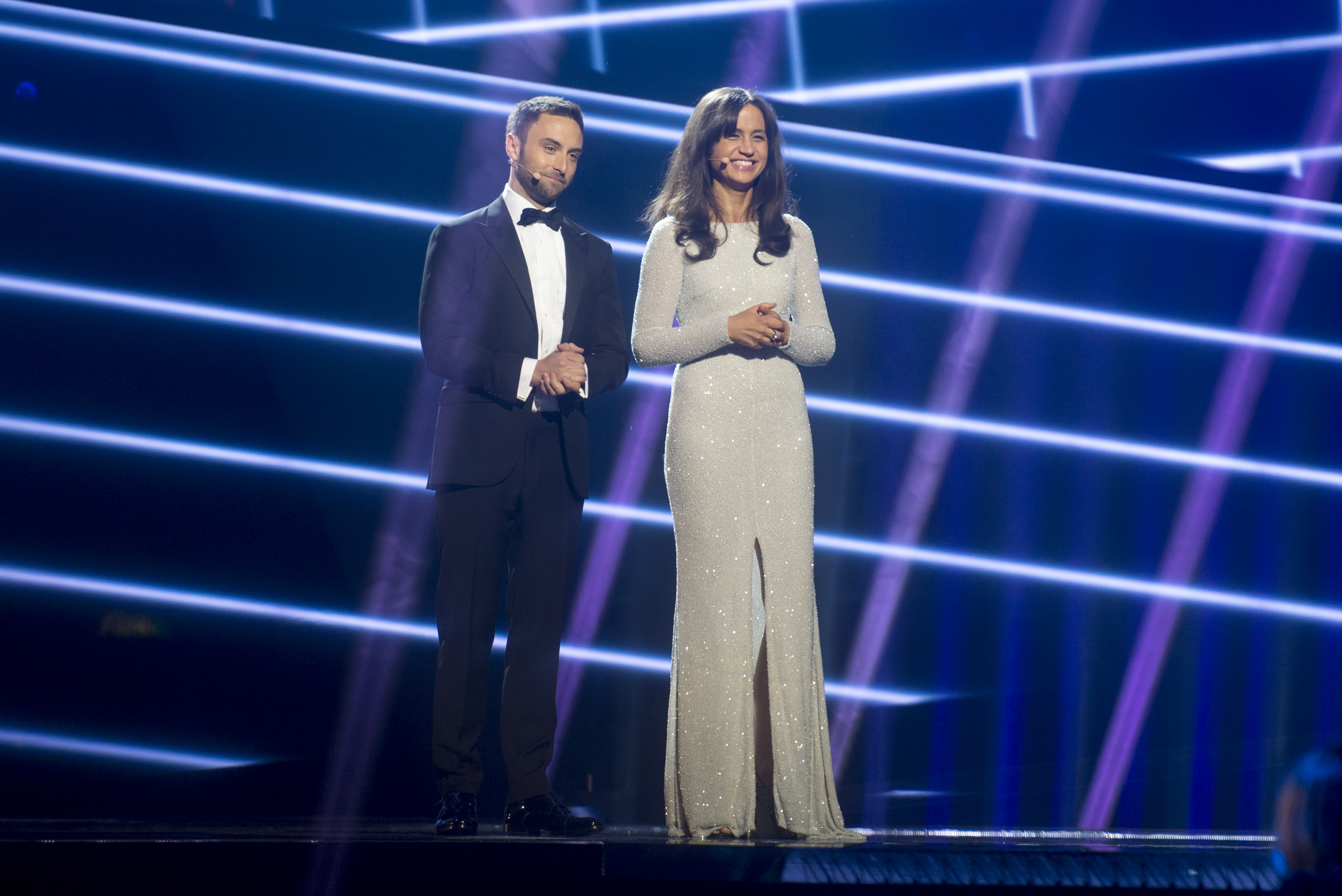
2016 hosts: Måns Zelmerlöw and Petra Mede

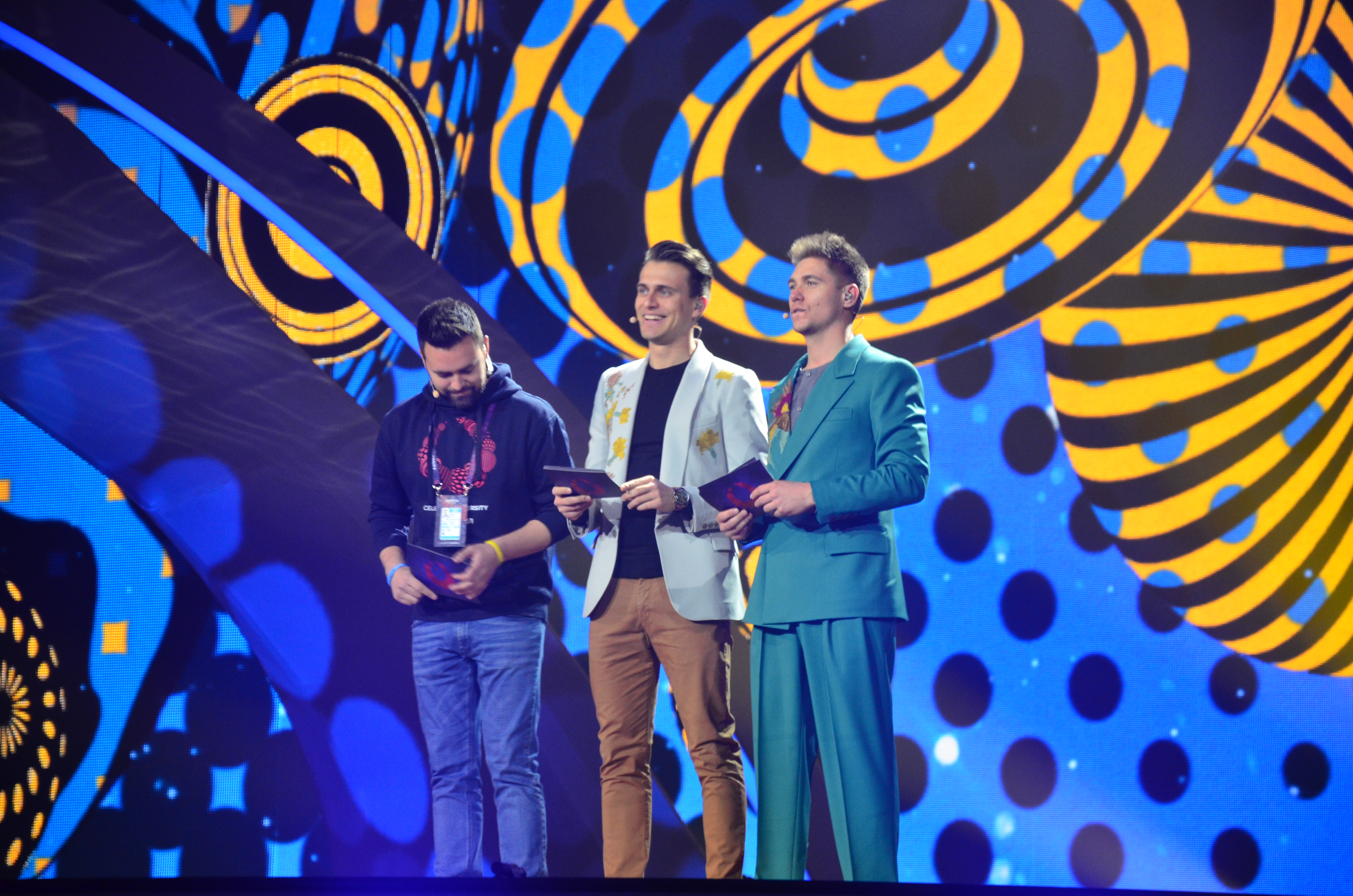
2017 hosts: Timur Miroshnychenko, Oleksandr Skichko and Volodymyr Ostapchuk

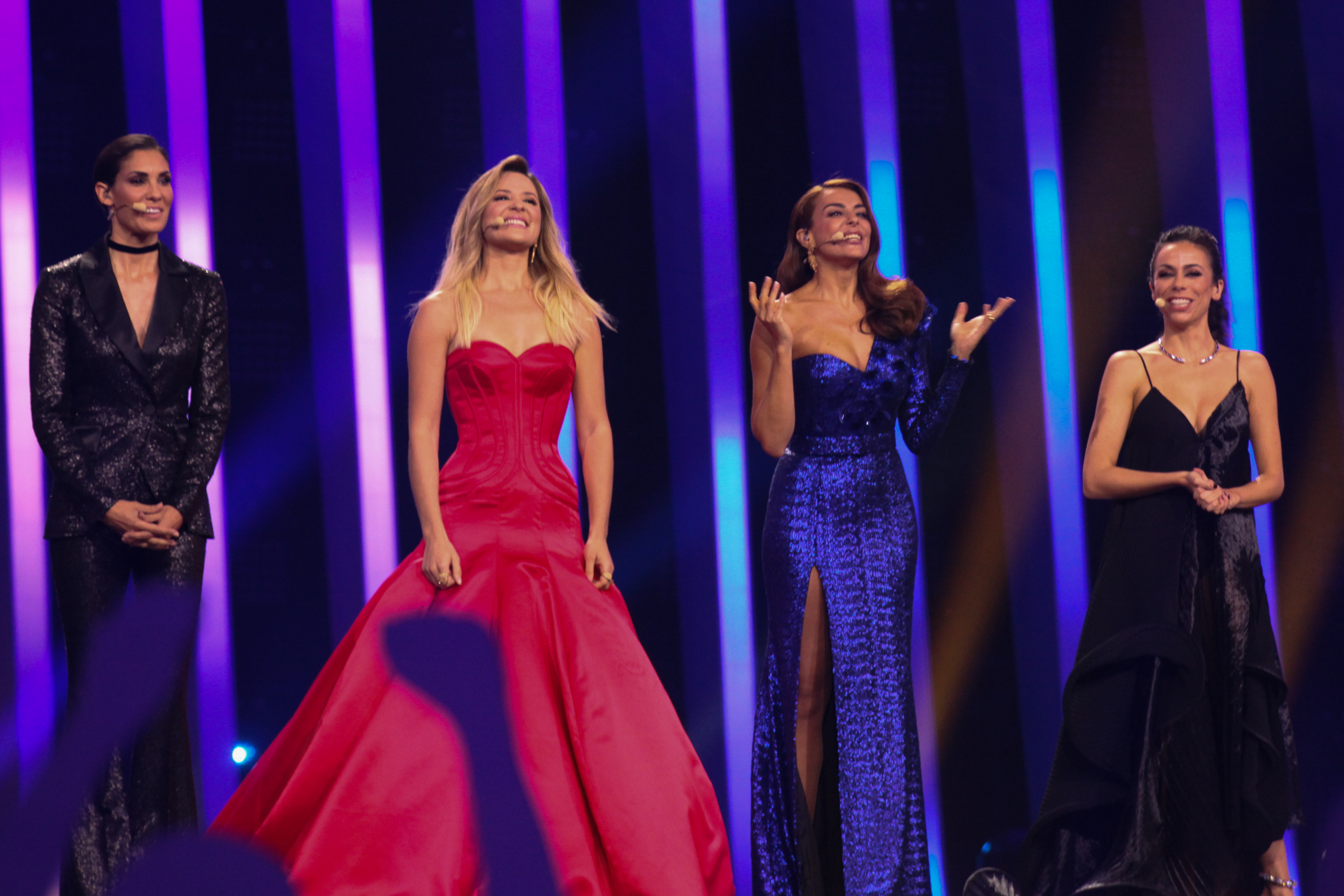
2018 hosts: Daniela Ruah, Sílvia Alberto, Catarina Furtado and Filomena Cautela

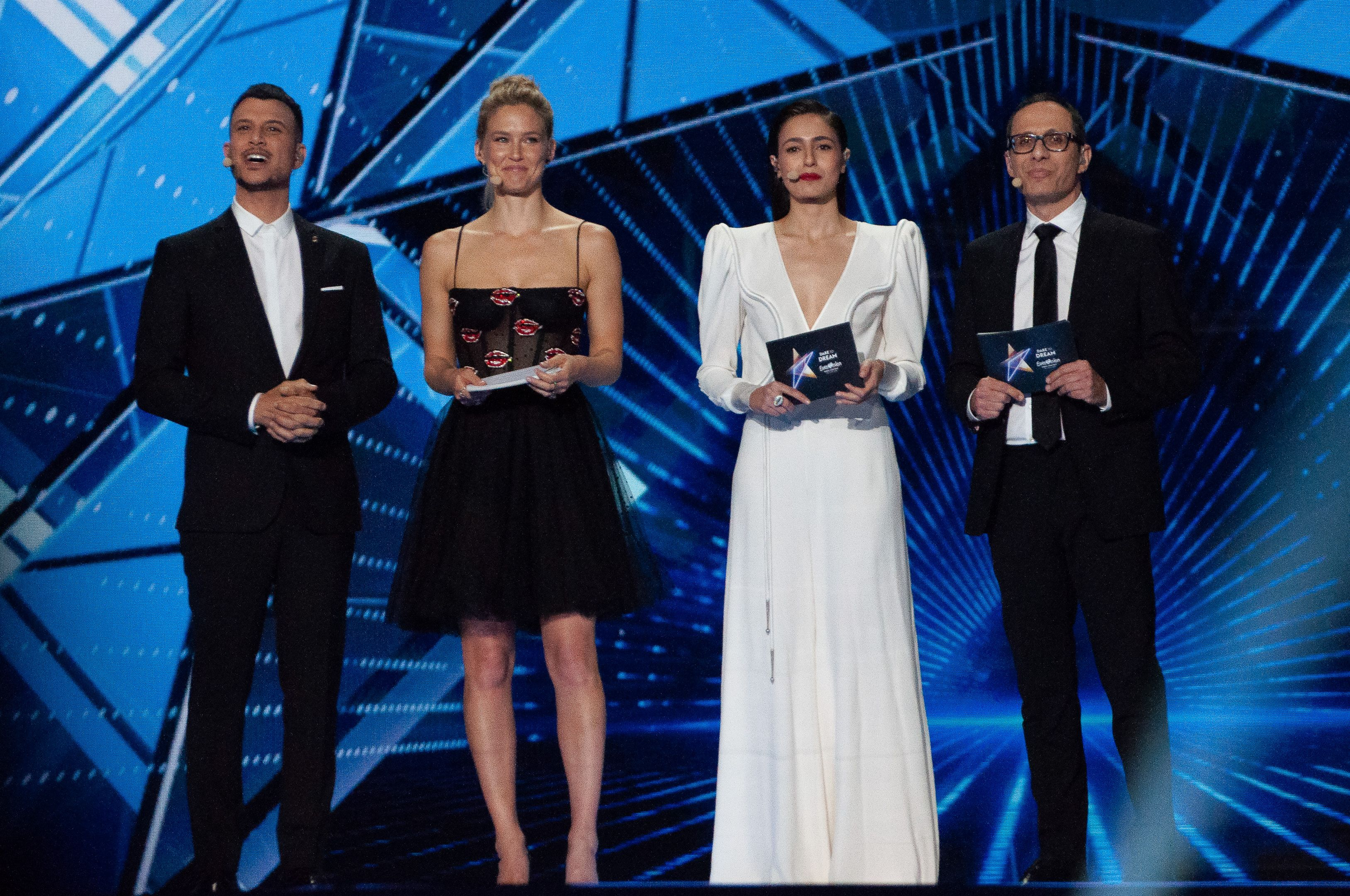
2019 hosts: Assi Azar, Bar Refaeli, Lucy Ayoub and Erez Tal

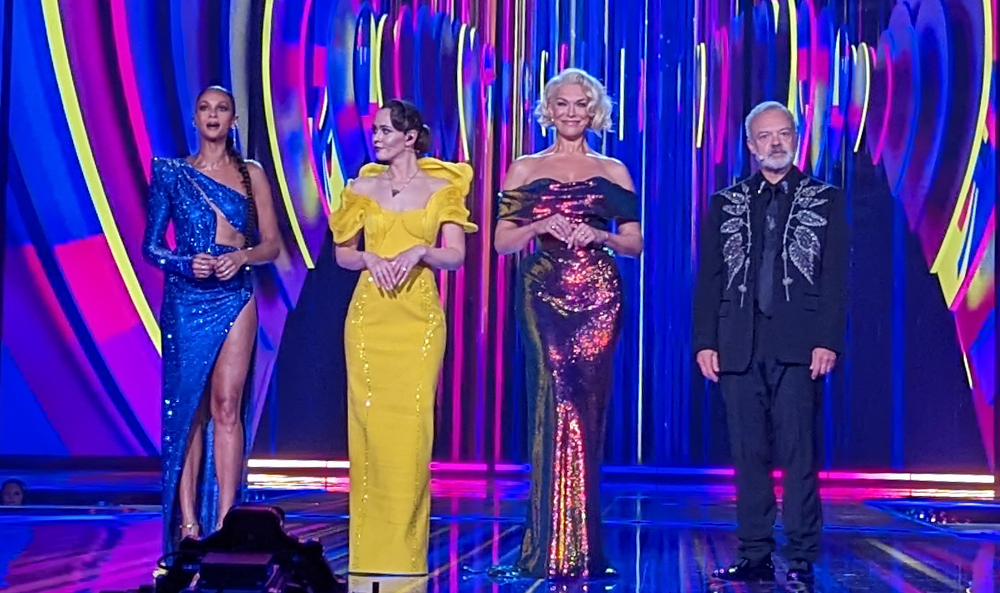
2023 hosts (final): Alesha Dixon, Julia Sanina, Hannah Waddingham and Graham Norton

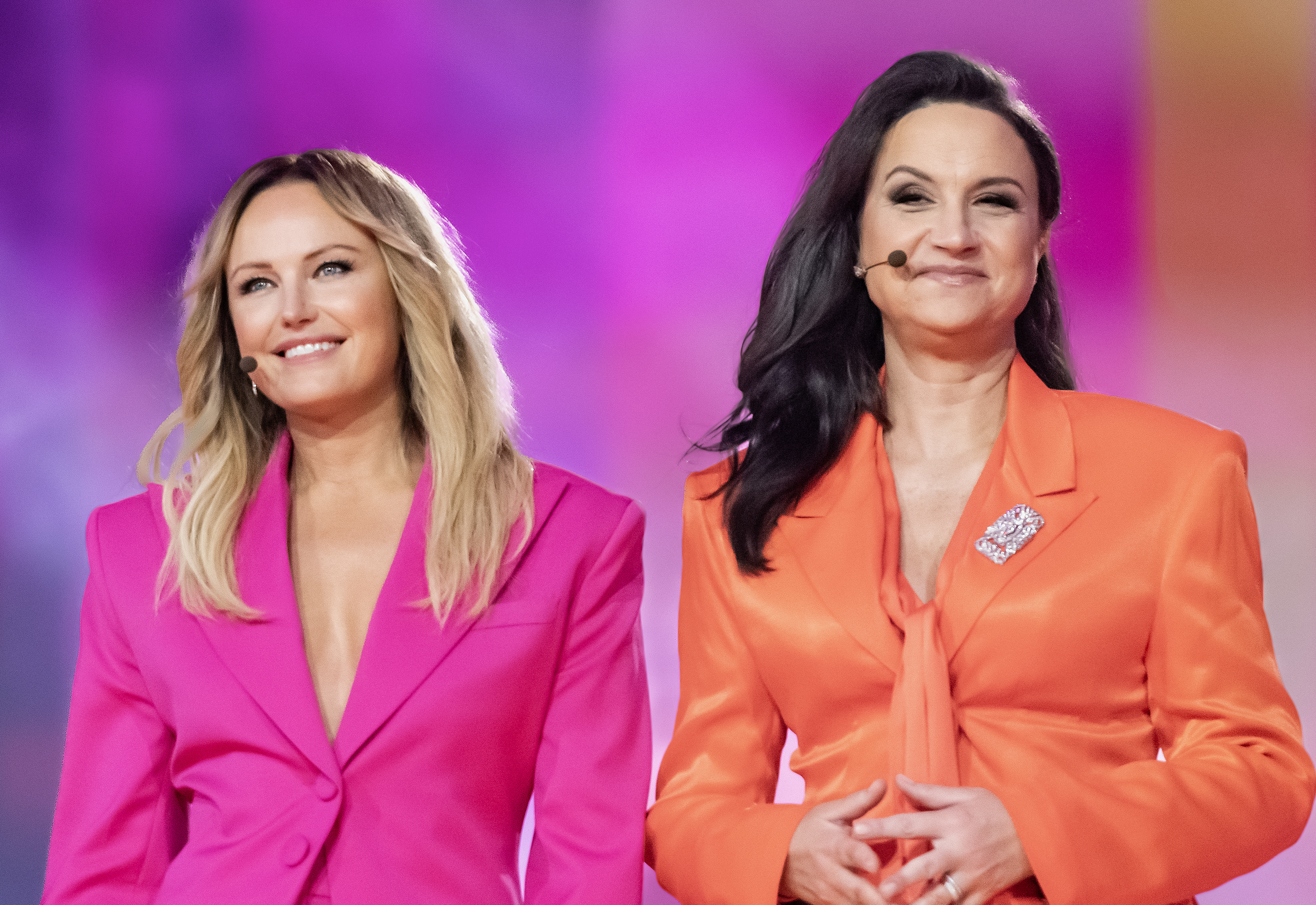
2024 hosts: Malin Åkerman and Petra Mede

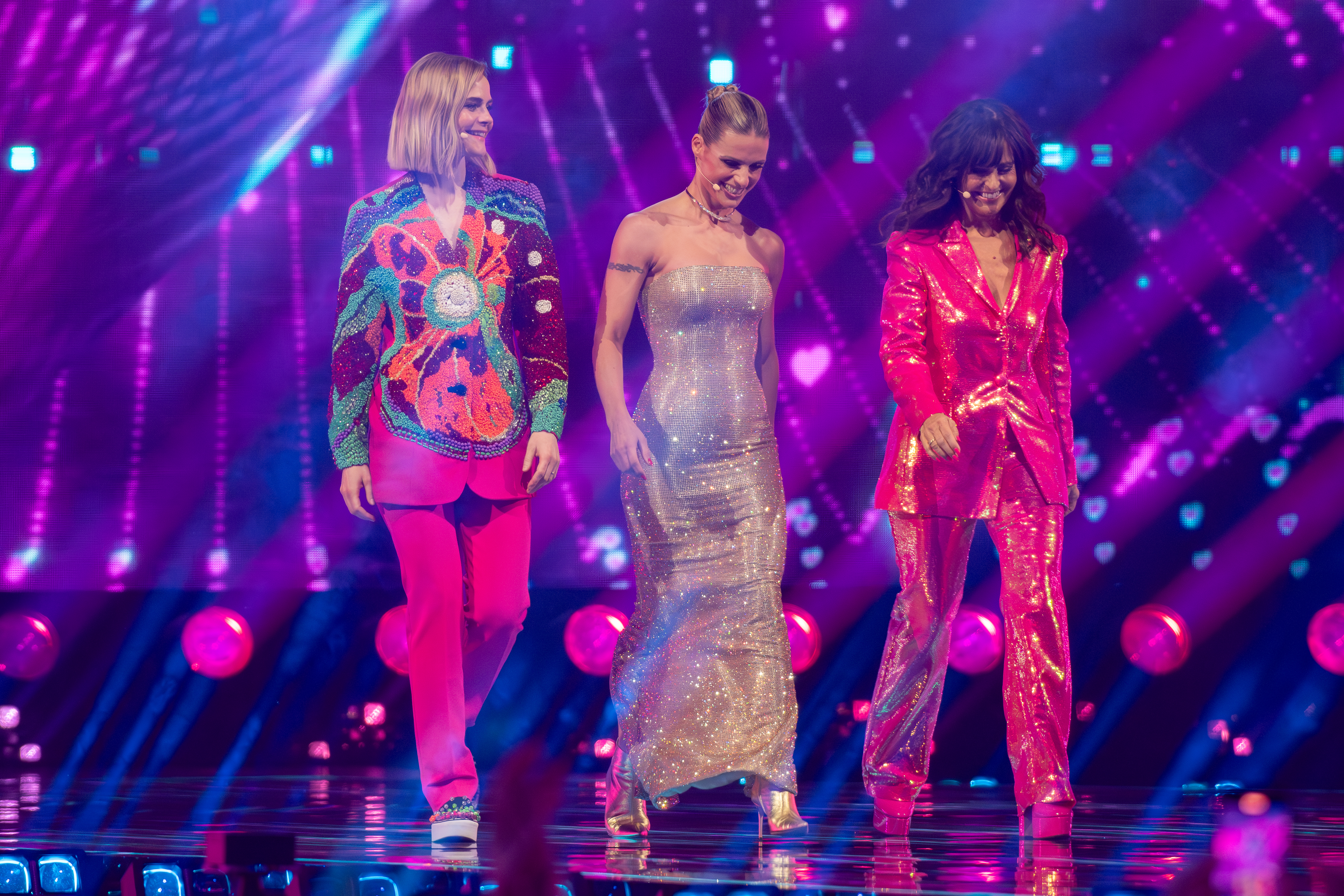
2025 hosts (final): Hazel Brugger, Michelle Hunziker and Sandra Studer

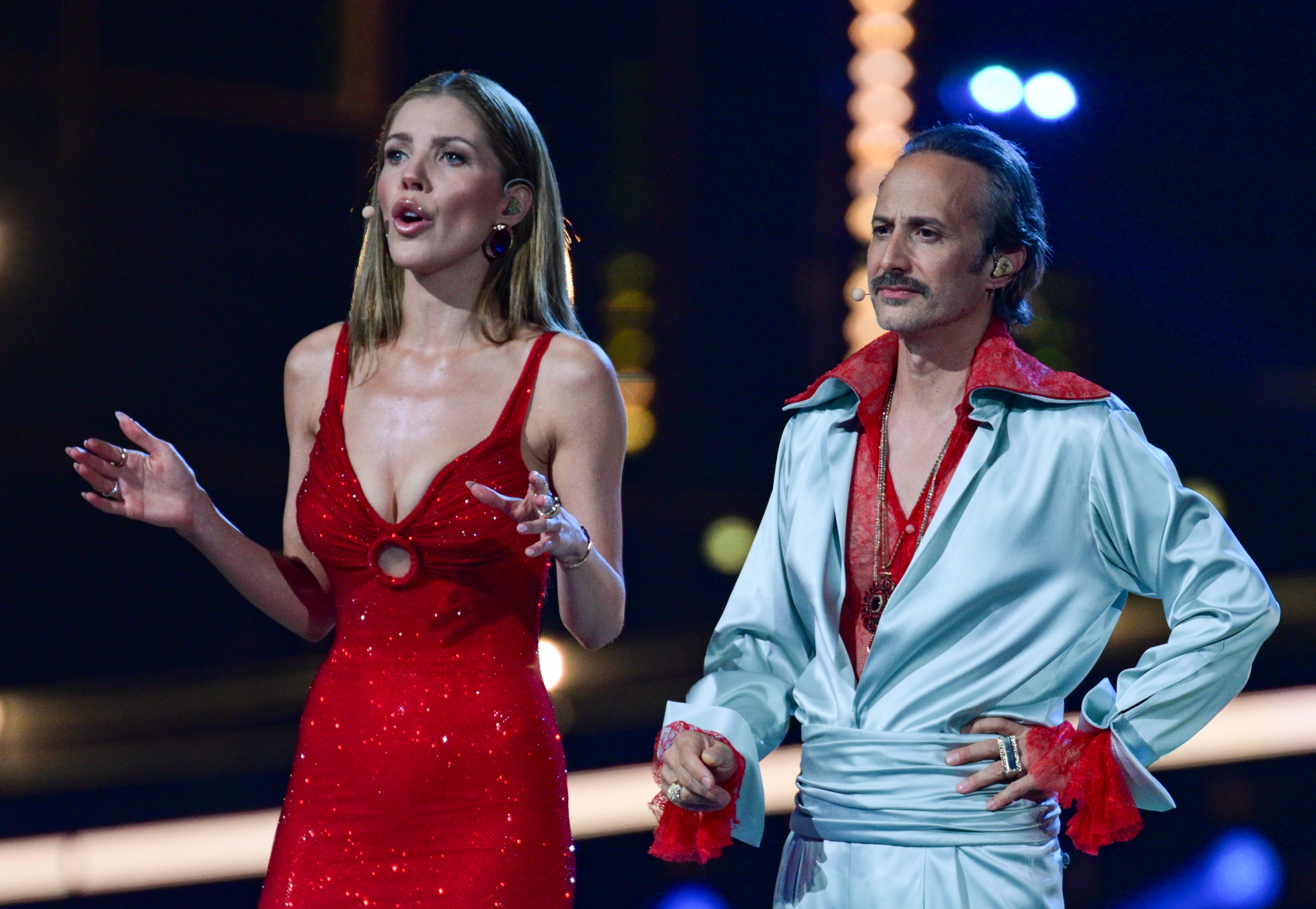
2026 hosts: Victoria Swarovski and Michael Ostrowski

== See also ==
- List of Junior Eurovision Song Contest presenters

== Notes and references ==
=== Further reading ===
- Roxburgh, Gordon (2020). Songs for Europe: The United Kingdom at the Eurovision Song Contest. Vol. Four: The 1990s. Prestatyn: Telos Publishing. ISBN 978-1-84583-163-9.
