= Leyla Aliyeva (disambiguation) =

Leyla Aliyeva (born 1984) is an Azerbaijani politician

Leyla Aliyeva may also refer to:

- Leyla Aliyeva (judoka) (born 1997), Azerbaijani judoka
- Leyla Aliyeva (presenter) (born 1986), Azerbaijani television presenter
