= Anke Engelke =

German comedian and actress

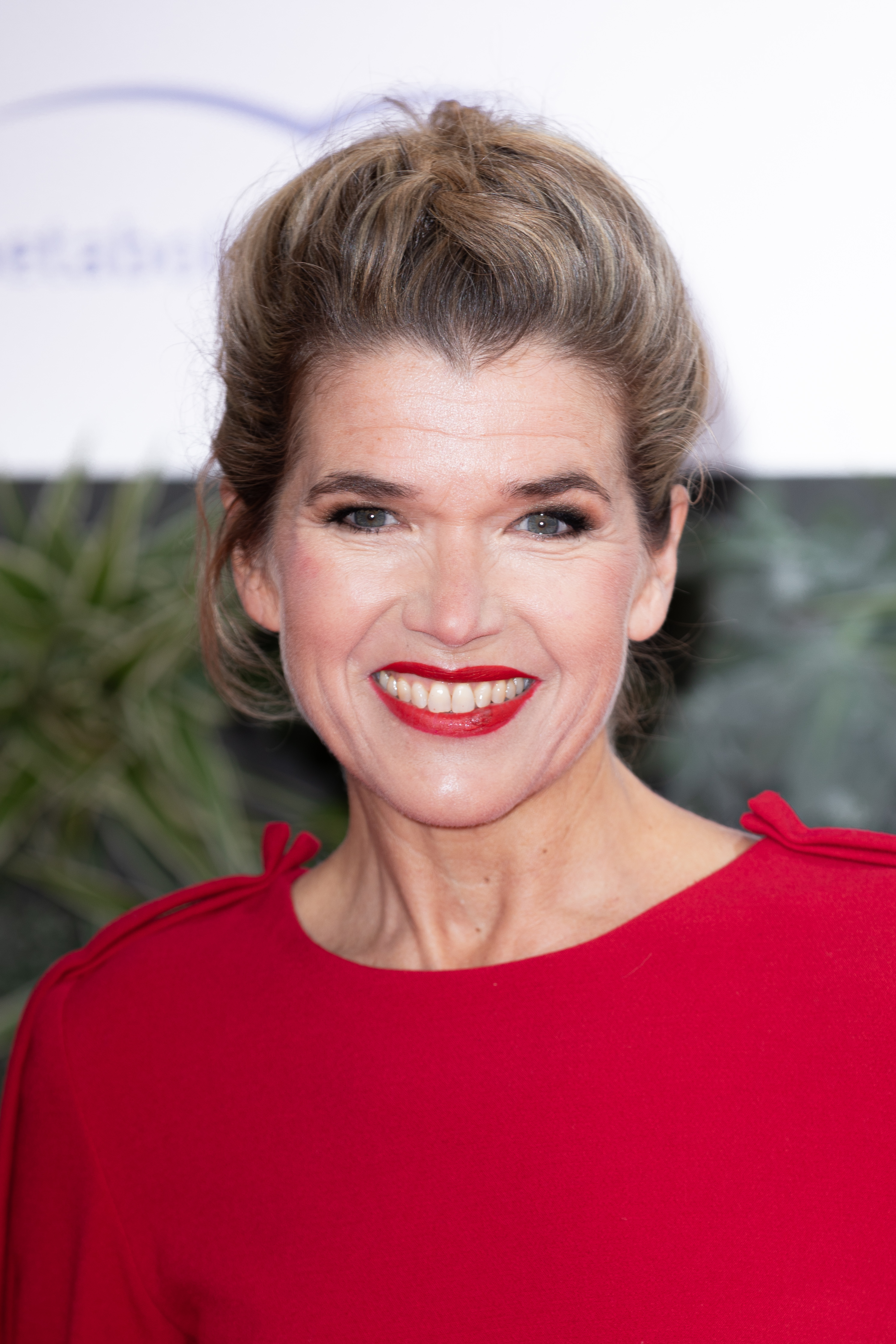
- Engelke 2019
- Born: Anke Christina Engelke; 21 December 1965 (age 60); Montreal, Quebec, Canada
- Other name: Anke Christina Fischer
- Occupations: Comedian, actress, TV presenter
- Years active: 1979-present
- Spouses: Andreas Grimm (m. 1994; div. 2005) Claus Fischer (m. 2005; div. 2015)
- Children: 3

Anke Christina Fischer (née Engelke; born 21 December 1965) is a German comedian, actress, voice-actress, and television presenter.

== Personal life ==
Born in Montreal, Canada, Engelke moved to Cologne, Germany in 1971 with her German parents. Early on, she exhibited singing talent, and was discovered in 1978 by Georg Bossert at a performance of her school's choir.

From 1994 to 2000, Engelke was married to the keyboardist Andreas Grimm with whom she has a daughter. She was married to musician Claus Fischer from 2005 to 2015, with whom she has two sons.

== Career ==
From 1979 to 1986, she was the presenter of the daily children's television show broadcast from the Funkausstellung (a German radio exhibition, held every other year in Berlin), and the weekly children and youth's sports magazine show Pfiff. From 1978 to 1980, she hosted the show Moment mal (Wait a minute) on RTL. SWF3 first brought her on board in 1986 as an editor; later on, she was the presenter there until 1998. She has sung with Fred Kellner und die famosen Soul Sisters since 1989. Since 1993, she has been part of the SWF3-Comedy-Ensemble Gagtory.

From 1996 to 2000, she was part of Die Wochenshow on Sat.1, a rather famous comedy TV show in Germany at that time, alongside Bastian Pastewka, Ingolf Lück and Marco Rima.

In 2003, Engelke and Olli Dittrich were awarded the Grimme-Preis for the improv show Blind Date 2 – Taxi nach Schweinau.

In December 2003, Engelke provided the voice of Dory in the German dubbing of the animated film Finding Nemo, which is voiced by Ellen DeGeneres in the English original. She also provided the voice of Jane Porter in the German dubbing of the Disney movie Tarzan, who is voiced by Minnie Driver in the original version.

Engelke can also be seen in the successful sketch comedy show Ladykracher on Sat.1. On 17 May 2004, when the very successful Die Harald Schmidt Show left Sat.1, Engelke took over its timeslot with Anke Late Night, which was cancelled due to low ratings a few months later on 21 October 2004.

Engelke has been the German voice of Marge Simpson on The Simpsons since her predecessor Elisabeth Volkmann died in the summer of 2006. Elisabeth Volkmann was Marge's German voice for 15 years until her death. Engelke's first episode was "My fair Laddy", which aired in Germany on 21 January 2007.

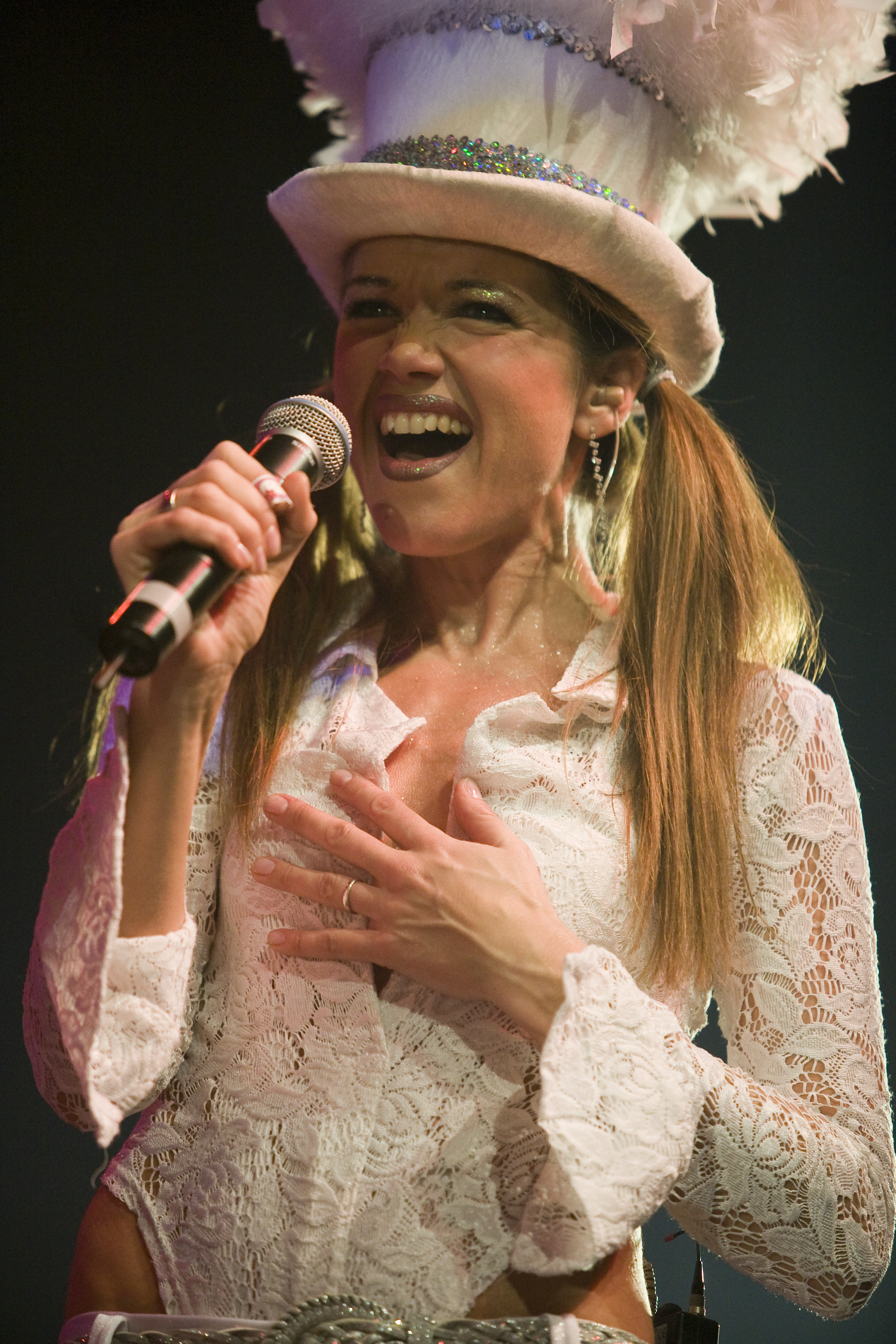
Engelke performing in 2008

In December 2009, she hosted the European Film Awards ceremony, a role she would repeat in 2010, 2011 and 2012.

In May 2011, she hosted the Eurovision Song Contest 2011 in Düsseldorf alongside Stefan Raab and Judith Rakers.

The following year, Engelke served as the spokesperson for Germany at the Eurovision Song Contest 2012 held in Baku, Azerbaijan. Before presenting the votes, she also gave a live statement on the human-rights issues in the hosting country, saying: "Tonight nobody could vote for their own country. But it is good to be able to vote. And it is good to have a choice. Good luck on your journey, Azerbaijan. Europe is watching you." She was the only spokesperson to articulately address human rights during the event. She had also served as one of Germany's national juries for the contest during that year.

In February 2013, her involvement with the Eurovision Song Contest continued as she hosted Unser Song für Malmö, the German national final.

== Filmography ==
=== Film ===
| Year | Film | Role | Notes |
|---|---|---|---|
| 2000 | Bundle of Joy | Christine | |
| 2001 | Der Schuh des Manitu | Abahachi and Winnetouch's mother | (extended edition) |
| 2001 | The Little Polar Bear | Mutter Eisbär | (voice) |
| 2003 | Operation Dance Sensation | Veronica Rell | |
| 2003 | Just Get Married! | Ina | |
| 2003 | Finding Nemo | Dory | Voice (German dub) |
| 2004 | Germanikus | Senator's wife | |
| 2004 | Der Wixxer | Doris Dubinsky | |
| 2005 | About the Looking for and the Finding of Love | Helena Stokowski | |
| 2005 | The Little Polar Bear 2: The Mysterious Island | Iguanita/Frieda | (voice) |
| 2006 | Urmel aus dem Eis | Wutz | (voice) |
| 2006 | The Trip to Panama | Fish | (voice) |
| 2007 | The Simpsons Movie | Marge Simpson | (voice) |
| 2007 | Vollidiot | Owl | |
| 2008 | Urmel voll in Fahrt | Wutz | (voice) |
| 2008 | Freche Mädchen | Mila's mother | |
| 2009 | Lippels Traum | Frau Jakob / Böse Tante | |
| 2010 | Freche Mädchen 2 | Mila's mother | |
| 2015 | Frau Müller muss weg! | Jessica Höfel | |
| 2015 | Ghosthunters on Icy Trails | Hetty Cuminseed | |
| 2017 | Happy Burnout | Alexandra | |
| 2017 | Nur ein Tag | (voice) | |
| 2018 | The Most Beautiful Girl in the World | Cyril's mother | |
| 2021 | My Son | Marlene | |
| 2022 | Locked-in Society | Heidi Lohmann | |
| 2023 | The Interpreter of Silence | Edith Bruhns | |

=== Mini Series ===
| Year | Film | Role | Notes |
|---|---|---|---|
| 2025 | Boah Bahn! | Tina Bowermann | a Mini Series made by Deutsche Bahn posted on Social Media in Cooperation with Anke Engelke |

=== Songs ===
| Year | Song name | Role | Notes | Producer | Published by |
|---|---|---|---|---|---|
| 2025 | Der Bahn Song | Tina Bowermann | a Song made by Deutsche Bahn in Cooperation with Anke Engelke for the Mini Series "Boah Bahn!" | Score Squad | wtf GmbH |

=== Television ===
| Year | Film | Role | Notes |
|---|---|---|---|
| 1996-2000 | Die Wochenshow | Host and sketches | German Television Award for Best Entertainment Program shared with Ingolf Lück, Bastian Pastewka, Markus Maria Profitlich, Ralf Guenther and Josef Ballerstaller (1999); German Comedy Award for Best Comedy/Variety Show shared with Josef Ballerstaller, Rainer Bender, Ralf Guenther, Ingolf Lück, Bastian Pastewka and Marco Rima (1999); Goldene Kamera-Audience Camera (1999); Adolf Grimme Award for Outstanding Individual Achievement (1999) |
| 1997 | Tatort | Anke | Episode: "Tod im All" |
| 1998 | ...und im Keller gärt es | | Episodes: "Umbau", "Klapsmühle", "Prinz" |
| 2001 | Blind Date | Yvonne | |
| 2000-2001 | Anke | Anke | German Comedy Award for Best Female Comedian (2000–2001) |
| 2002 | Blind Date 2 – Taxi nach Schweinau | Ruth | Bavarian TV Award shared with Olli Dittrich (2003); Adolf Grimme Award in Gold for Fiction/Entertainment shared with Olli Dittrich (2003); Nominated-German Television Award for Best Comedy Program shared with Olli Dittrich (2002) |
| 2002 | Blind Date 3 – Der fünfbeinige Elefant | Constanze Pillmann | |
| 2002-2010 | Ladykracher | Various Roles | German Television Award for Best Comedy Program (2002, 2011); German Comedy Award for Best Female Comedian (2002); German Comedy Award for Best Comedy/Variety Show shared Ralf Guenther and Josef Ballerstaller; Golden Rose for Best Performance – Comedy – Female (2004); Nominated-German Comedy Award for Best Comedian (2003); Nominated-Goldene Kamera for Best Entertainment Show (2009) |
| 2003 | Lindenstraße | Conny / Moderatorin | Episode: "Heldentum" |
| 2003 | Blind Date 4 – London, Moabit | Caroline | |
| 2004 | Blind Date 5 – Blaues Geheimnis | Sonja Mette | |
| 2004 | Anke Late Night | Host and sketches | 43 episodes |
| 2005 | Blind Date 6 – Tanzen verboten | Elke | |
| 2006-2007 | LadyLand | Andrea Steinkamp / various other roles | 11 episodes |
| 2006-2009 | Pastewka | Anke Engelke | 3 episodes |
| 2007–present | The Simpsons | Marge Simpson | German voice |
| 2007 | Fröhliche Weihnachten | Anneliese / Mario Barth / Nina Hagen / Shakira / various other roles | German Comedy Award for Best Comedy Event shared with Bastian Pastewka (2008); Bavarian TV Award shared with Bastian Pastewka (2008); Adolf Grimme Award for Entertainment shared with Bastian Pastewka (2008); Nominated-German Television Award for Best Comedy shared with Bastian Pastewka (2008) |
| 2007-2010 | Komissarin Lucas | Rike | 8 episodes |
| 2008 | Mitternachtsspitzen | Amy Winehouse / Frau Schmickler | Episode: "20 Jahre Mitternachtsspitzen" |
| 2009 | Fröhliche Weihnachten II | Various roles | |
| 2009 | 22nd European Film Awards | Host | |
| 2010 | 23rd European Film Awards | Host | with Märt Avandi |
| 2011 | Fröhlicher Frühling | Various roles | |
| 2011 | Eurovision Song Contest 2011 | Host | with Stefan Raab and Judith Rakers; German Television Award for Best Entertainment Program (2011) |
| 2011 | 24th European Film Awards | Host | |
| 2012 | Eurovision Song Contest 2012 | Herself | Spokesperson presenting German votes. National jury for Germany. |
| 2012 | 25th European Film Awards | Host | |
| 2013 | Unser Song für Malmö | Host | |
| 2013 | Anke hat Zeit | Host | Originally titled Helge hat Zeit and presented by Helge Schneider who terminated his version of the show after 2 episodes |
| 2018 | Deutschland 86 | Barbara Dietrich | 7 episodes |
| 2020 | The Last Word | Karla Fazius | 6 episodes |

=== Video games ===
| Year | Game | Voice role | Notes |
|---|---|---|---|
| 2007 | The Simpsons Game | Marge Simpson | German voice |

== Audiobooks ==
- 2009: Heike Faller: Wie ich einmal versuchte, reich zu werden, publisher: Random House Audio, ISBN 978-3-8371-7610-0
- 2013: Felix Salten: Bambi: Eine Lebensgeschichte aus dem Walde, publisher: tacheles, ISBN 978-3864840289

| Preceded by (Norway) Nadia Hasnaoui, Haddy N'jie and Erik Solbakken | Eurovision Song Contest presenter 2011; With: Judith Rakers and Stefan Raab | Succeeded by (Azerbaijan) Leyla Aliyeva, Nargiz Berk-Petersen and Eldar Gasimov |
