= Marlene Charell =

German entertainer

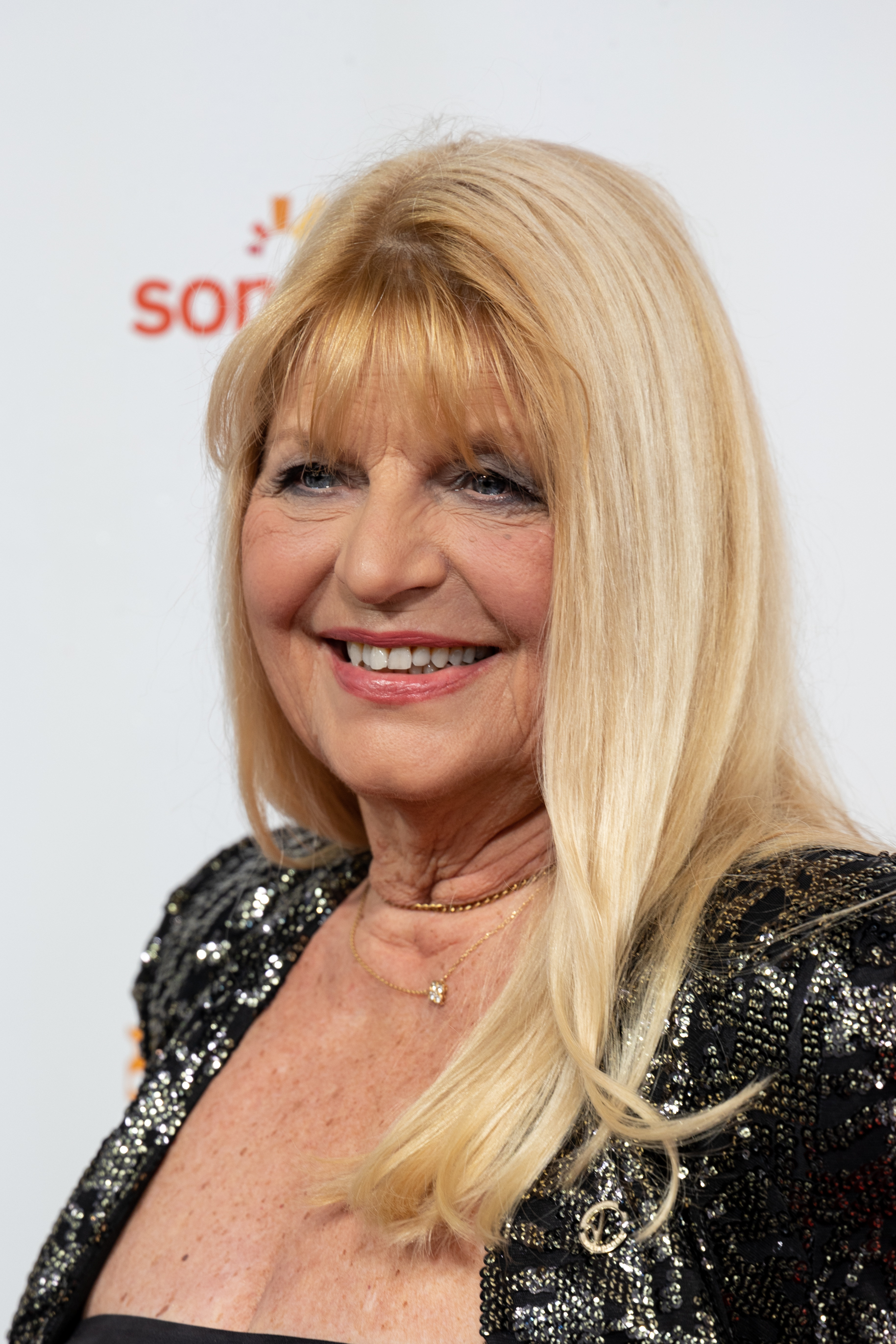
- Charell in 2023
- Born: Angela Miebs; 27 June 1944 (age 81); Winsen, Lower Saxony, Germany
- Occupation: Entertainer
- Known for: Being the lead dancer at Le Lido in Paris
- Spouse: Roger Pappini (m. 1971)
- Children: 1 daughter

Marlene Charell (born Angela Miebs on 27 June 1944) is a German entertainer and was the leading dancer and superstar at Le Lido in Paris from 1968 until the end of 1970. Her stage name is an amalgamation of the entertainers Marlene Dietrich and Erik Charell.

== Biography ==
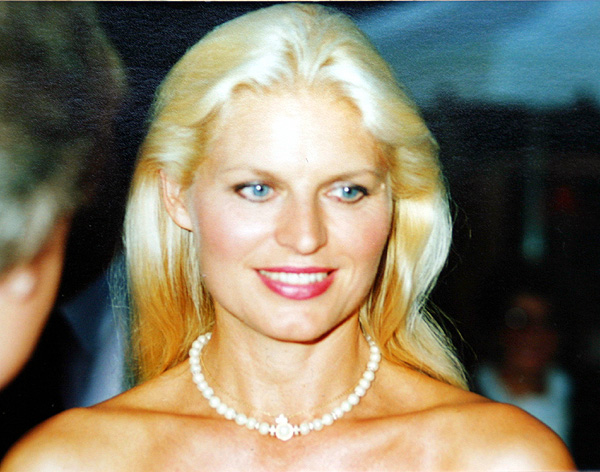
Charell in 1987

Charell grew up in Hamburg as the daughter of a native Silesian. As a six-year-old girl, she performed in the circus. Later she trained in acrobatics, ballet, dance, gymnastics, singing and acting.

She also danced at The Dunes casino in Las Vegas in the show Casino de Paris in 1966 and in "Folies Bergere" from 1962 until 1968. Because of the apparent length and beautiful shape of her legs she was labeled as 'Miss Longlegs'. In 1972, she featured alongside Engelbert Humperdinck in the 13-week BBC TV series Engelbert with The Young Generation, an entertainment series airing on BBC1.

In 1983 she hosted the Eurovision Song Contest at the Rudi-Sedlmayer-Halle in Munich.

== See also ==
- List of Eurovision Song Contest presenters

Preceded by (United Kingdom) Jan Leeming	Eurovision Song Contest presenter 1983	Succeeded by (Luxembourg) Désirée Nosbusch
