= Judith Rakers =

German journalist and television presenter (born 1976)

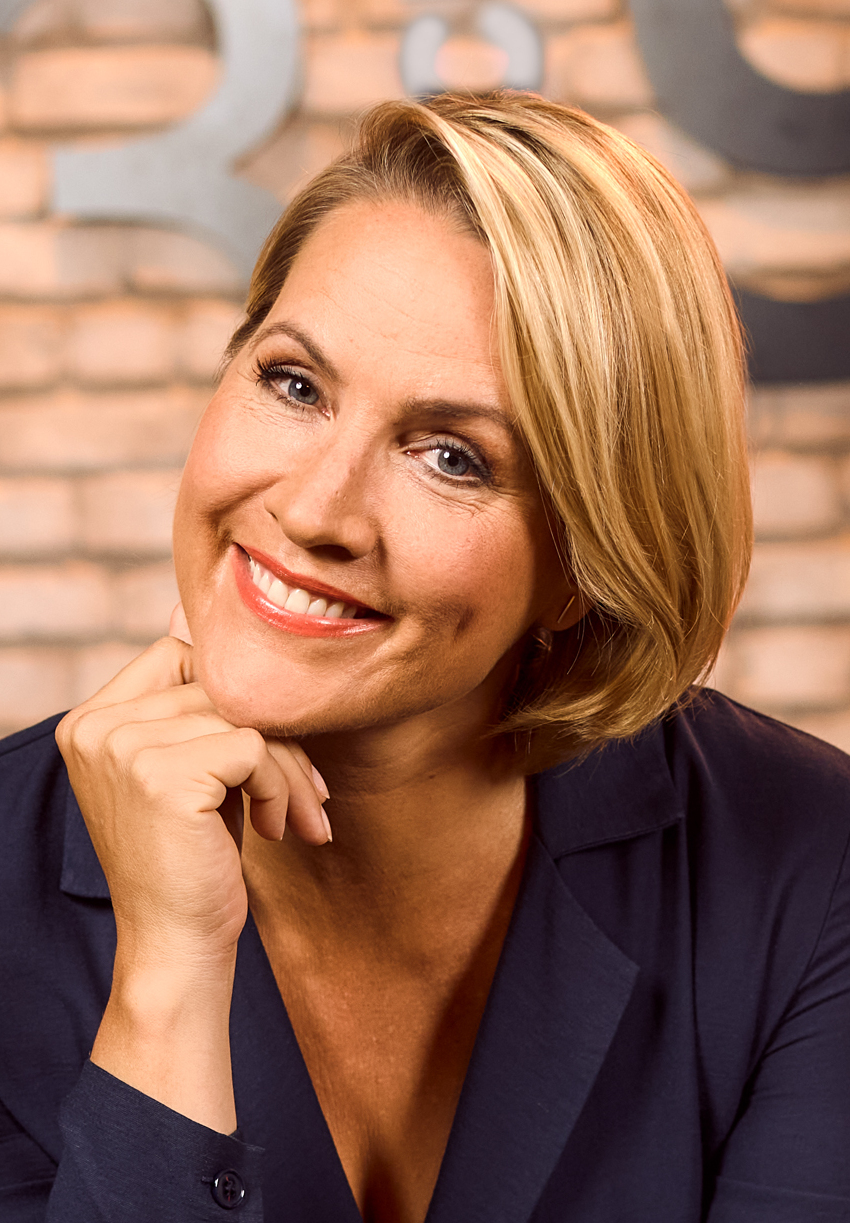
- Rakers in 2024
- Born: Judith Deborah Rakers; 6 January 1976 (age 50); Paderborn, West Germany
- Occupations: Journalist, TV presenter
- Years active: Early 2000s- present
- Presenting career
- Station: ARD
- Country: Germany
- Website: judithrakers.com

Judith Deborah Rakers (born 6 January 1976) is a German journalist and television presenter.

== Biography ==
Rakers was born in Paderborn, West Germany, and grew up in Bad Lippspringe with her single father. After graduating at Pelizaeus-Gymnasium Paderborn, from 1995 to 2001 she studied journalism and communication studies, German philology and modern and contemporary history at the University of Münster. In parallel, she worked as a radio presenter at the radio stations Radio Hochstift and Antenne Münster.

From January 2004 to 17 January 2010, Rakers presented the Hamburg Journal for local TV station Norddeutscher Rundfunk.

From 7 July 2005 to 31 January 2024, Rakers presented the Tagesschau news program on ARD. She also read the news in the Tagesthemen, Nachtmagazin and Morgenmagazin. Rakers also presents Radio Bremen's talk show 3 nach 9. On 14 May 2011 she hosted the Eurovision Song Contest 2011 in Düsseldorf, Germany, together with Stefan Raab and Anke Engelke.

Preceded by (Norway) Nadia Hasnaoui, Haddy N'jie and Erik Solbakken	Eurovision Song Contest presenter 2011; With: Anke Engelke and Stefan Raab	Succeeded by (Azerbaijan) Leyla Aliyeva, Nargiz Berk-Petersen and Eldar Gasimov
