= Anke Late Night =

- Genre: Talk show
- Starring: Anke Engelke
- Country of origin: Germany
- Original language: German

Production
- Producer: Brainpool

Original release
- Network: Sat.1
- Release: 17 May – 21 October 2004

Anke Late Night was a German late night talk show hosted by Anke Engelke and produced by Brainpool.

The show first aired on 17 May 2004 on Sat.1, in the same timeslot as Die Harald Schmidt Show. The stage band for the show was the "Electric Ladyband" led by Claus Fischer, who was previously the bassist for the TV total band. To generate publicity before the show's premiere, a €10,000 bet was arranged between Rudi Carrell and Olli Dittrich. Carrell bet that the show would bomb, a bet which he later took back.

The show was not able to fulfill the expectation of many viewers and the ratings for it dropped significantly in the first week. It had been announced in advance that people relating to daily news themes would be invited on a regular basis, but the show could not fulfill this promise.

From 5 to 30 August 2004, there was an interruption of the broadcasting of the show, contrary to announcements made in advance. The show was soon cancelled on 21 October 2004, due to low viewer ratings.
