= Nargiz Birk-Petersen =

Azerbaijani-American lawyer and presenter

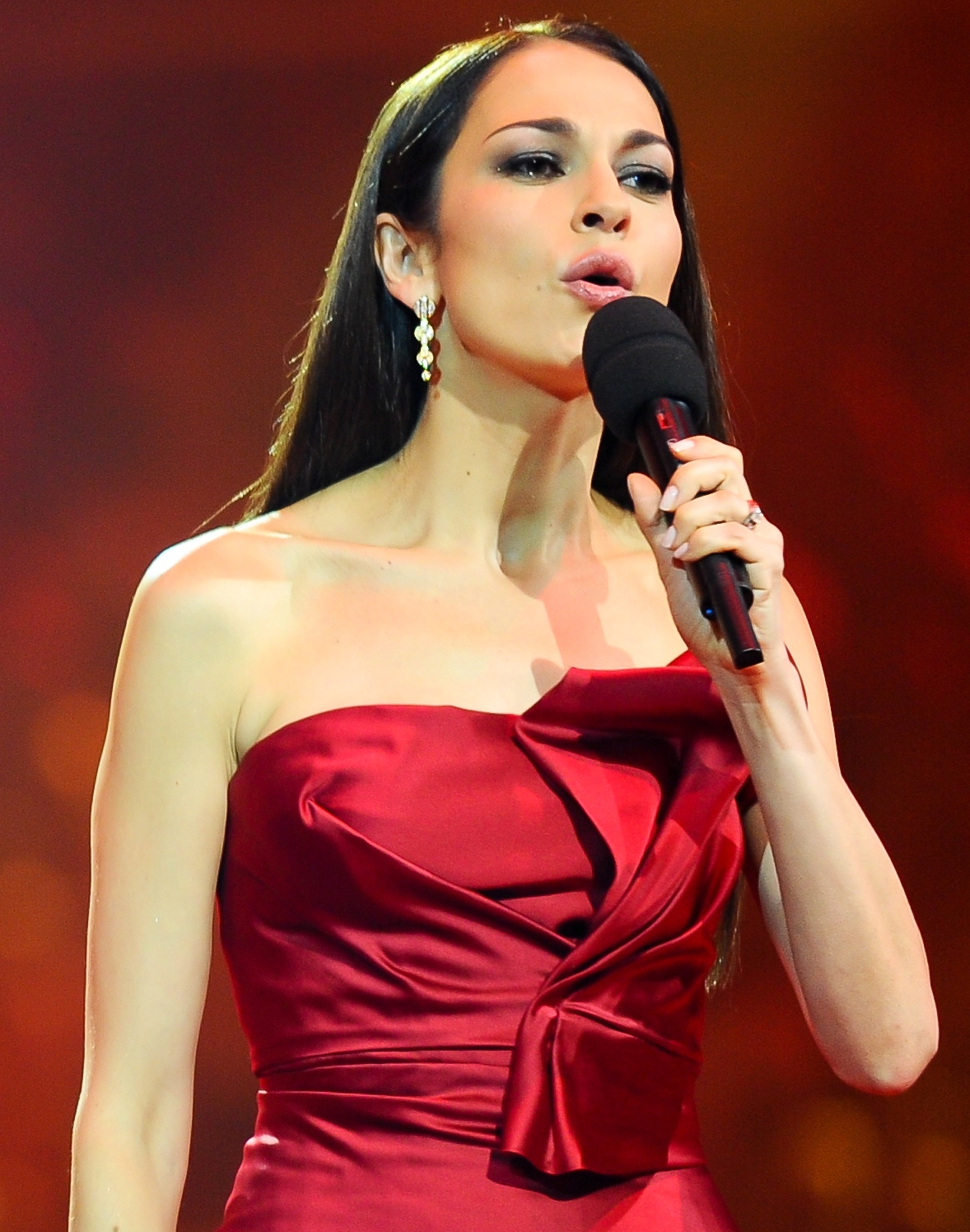
- Birk-Petersen presenting the Eurovision Song Contest 2012
- Born: Nərgiz İlqar qızı Abbaszadə; 7 August 1976 (age 50); Baku, Azerbaijan SSR, Soviet Union
- Education: Khazar University; University of Michigan (B.A.); Wayne State University (J.D.); Georgetown University (LL.M.)
- Occupations: Lawyer, presenter, model
- Mother: Maleyka Abbaszadeh

Nargiz Ilgar qizi Birk-Petersen (née Abbaszadeh; Azerbaijani: Nərgiz İlqar qızı Abbaszadə [næɾˈɟis ilˈɡɑɾ ɡɯˈzɯ ɑbɑsˈzɑdæ]; born 7 August 1976) is an Azerbaijani-American lawyer, presenter and model. She is known for presenting the Eurovision Song Contest 2012 in Baku, Azerbaijan together with Eldar Gasimov and Leyla Aliyeva.

== Career ==
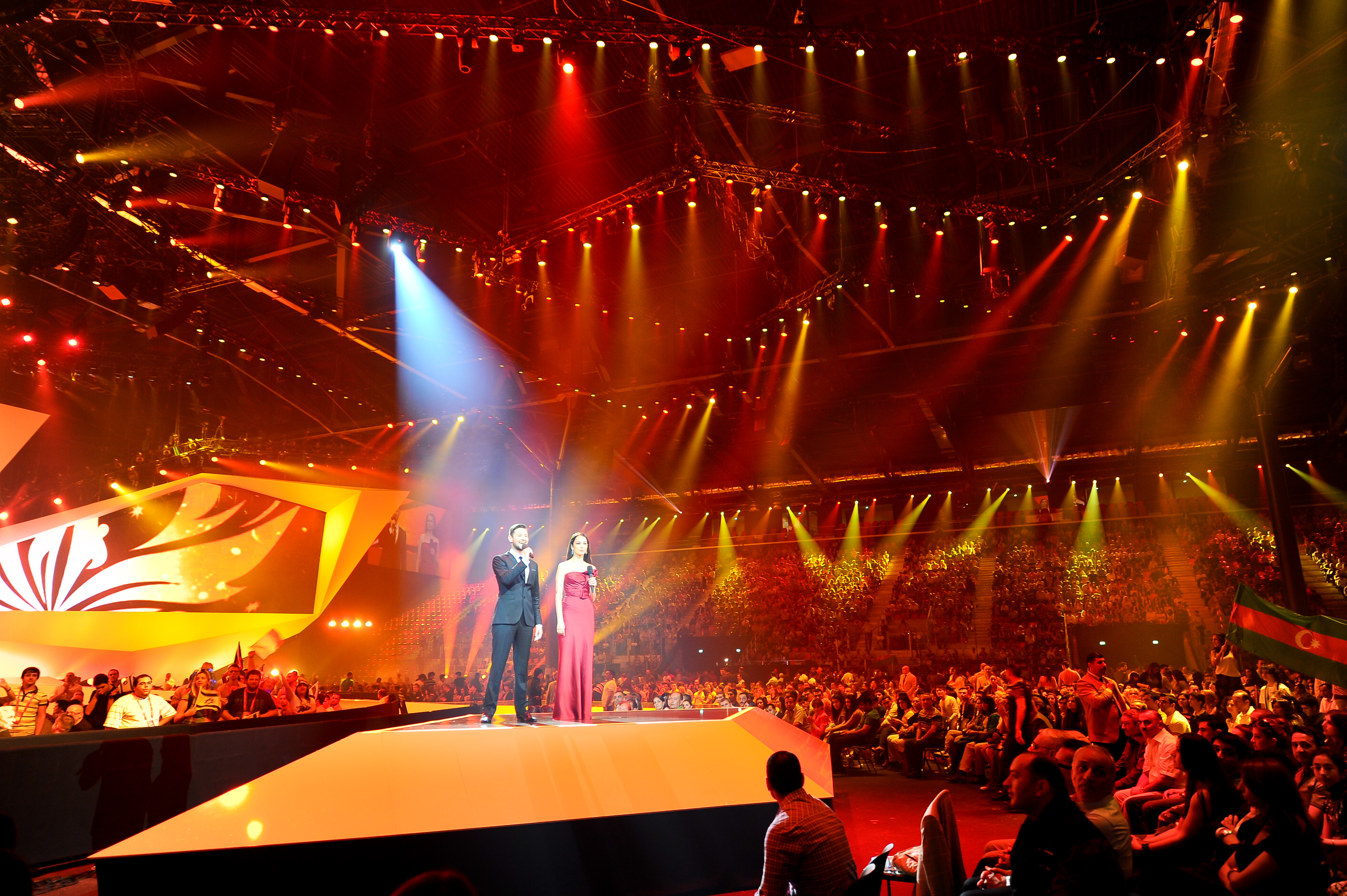
Eldar Gasimov and Birk-Petersen on the Eurovision Song Contest stage

Birk-Petersen was born and raised in Baku and attended secondary school in the Sabail district. At the age of 16, she began studying law at Khazar University. During her studies, she joined the university's student television station as a reporter for the English-language news program.

In 1994, she decided to leave Khazar University and moved to the United States, where her father lived. There, she worked a side job as a model while pursuing a bachelor's degree in psychology at the University of Michigan. Later on, she also obtained a J.D. degree from Wayne State University Law School and an LL.M. degree in international and comparative law from Georgetown University Law Center.

Birk-Petersen first practiced law in Washington, D.C., but later moved to Moscow, Russia, where she worked until 2011. In early 2012, she was appointed Head of Communications for the Baku bid for the 2020 Summer Olympics. In this capacity, she was part of the city's delegation to the general assembly of the Association of National Olympic Committees, alongside First Lady Mehriban Aliyeva and Ministers Yaqub Eyyubov and Azad Rahimov.

In the same year, Birk-Petersen was chosen to co-host the Eurovision Song Contest 2012 after participating in a casting organized by the Azerbaijani broadcaster İctimai Television. She presented three televised shows on 22, 24 and 26 May 2012 together with singer Eldar Gasimov and television presenter Leyla Aliyeva. The broadcasts attracted over 100 million viewers worldwide.

After the Eurovision Song Contest, Birk-Petersen has worked as a counsel for the pharmaceutical companies Novo Nordisk and Shire. Since 2019, she works as a senior director at Takeda Pharmaceutical Company. She is also the Head Counsel of the Dubai International Financial Centre.

== Personal life ==
Birk-Petersen's mother, Maleyka Abbaszadeh, is the chairperson of the State Student Admission Commission of Azerbaijan. She is married to Ulrik Birk-Petersen, a Danish diplomat whom she met in Washington, D.C., and currently resides in Dubai, United Arab Emirates, with her husband and their three children. She has previously lived in Østerbro, Copenhagen.

== See also ==
- List of Eurovision Song Contest presenters

Preceded by (Germany) Anke Engelke, Judith Rakers and Stefan Raab	Eurovision Song Contest presenter 2012; With: Leyla Aliyeva and Eldar Gasimov	Succeeded by (Sweden) Petra Mede
