= Jan Leeming =

British television presenter, newsreader (born 1942)

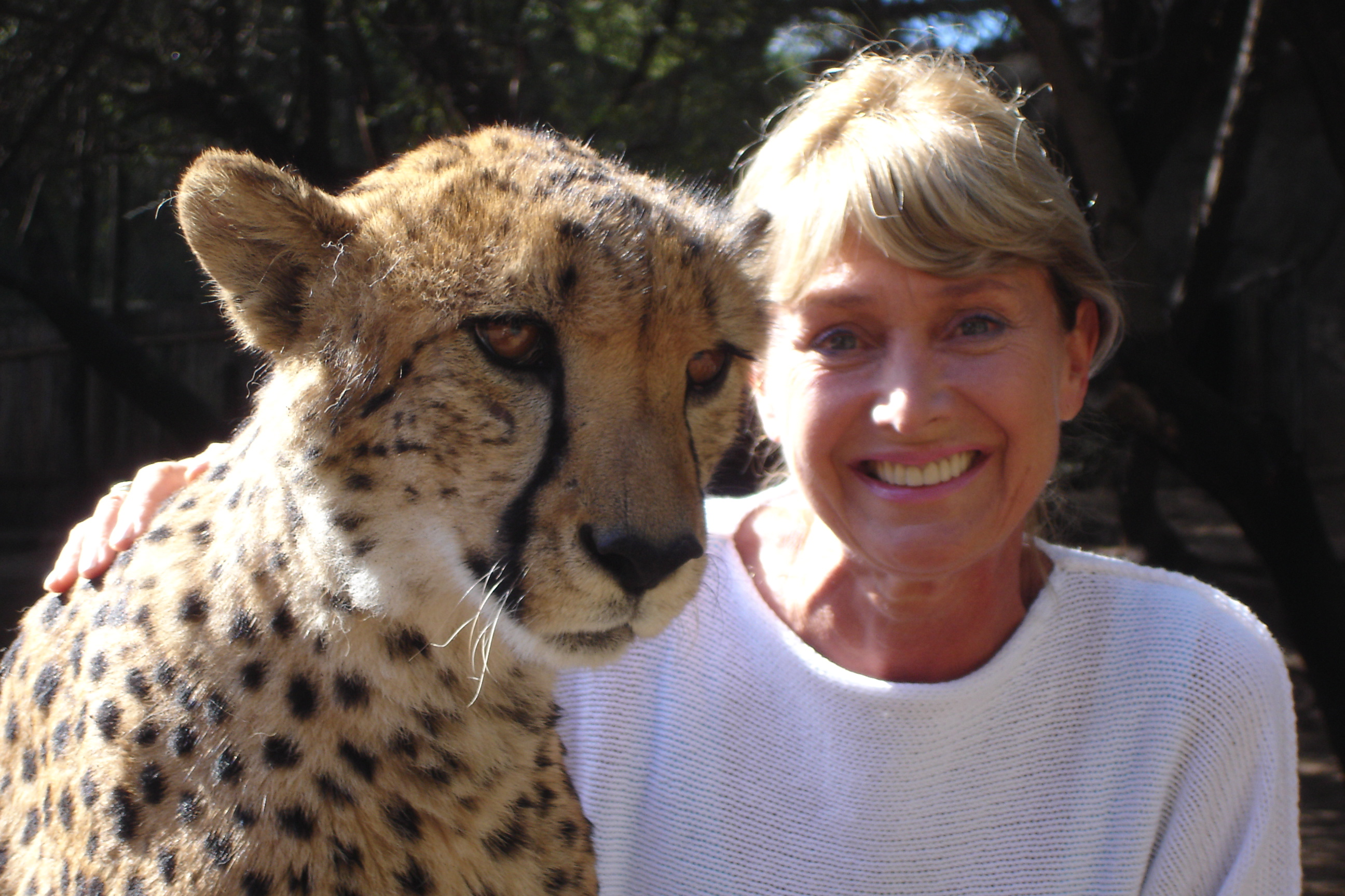
- Leeming with a cheetah in Oudtshoorn, South Africa
- Born: Janet Dorothy Atkins; 5 January 1942 (age 84); Barnehurst, Kent, England
- Occupations: TV presenter and newsreader
- Spouses: John Staple (m. 1961; div. 1962) Jeremy Gilchrist (m. 1972; div. 1973) Patrick Lunt (m. 1980; div. 1986) Eric Steenson (m. 1988; div. 1995) Christopher Russell (m. 1997; div. 2001)
- Children: 1
- Website: www.jan-leeming.com

Janet Dorothy Leeming (née Atkins; born 5 January 1942) is an English television presenter and newsreader.

== Early life and education ==
Leeming was born in Barnehurst, Kent, and educated at the Assumption Convent, Charlton and St Joseph's Convent Grammar School, Abbey Wood.

== Career ==
She worked as an actress and presenter in Australia and New Zealand before becoming well-known on British television for appearing in regional and children's programmes. An early UK TV role came in the BBC sitcom Hugh and I in December 1966. In 1969, she joined the presenting team of BBC1's children's science programme Tom Tom, which she co-hosted until 1970. In 1976, she fronted the 10–part BBC2 handicraft series Knitting Fashion which was repeated several times through to 1978. From 1977, she was the presenter of the BBC's regional programme Zodiac & Co for the South West area, switching to the Midlands for the regional show Midlands Tonight in 1979.

Leeming began a stint presenting the Monday–Friday BBC1 afternoon show Pebble Mill at One between 1976 and 1979, during which time she also often co-presented Radio 4's Woman's Hour.

Beginning in April 1980, she became one of Britain's best-known newsreaders across the BBC. She also hosted the 1982 Eurovision Song Contest.

She has kept a relatively low profile since leaving the newsroom in 1987. She was a stand-in newsreader for the Channel 4's breakfast show The Big Breakfast during the 1990s. Her later appearances included a role as herself in the film Whatever Happened to Harold Smith?, starring Tom Courtenay, in 1999; and latterly on Good Morning Australia; Esther and Through the Keyhole. At the Barbican she presented the RAF concert to mark the 60th anniversary of the Battle of Britain.

Since the year 2000, much of her time has been spent in corporate work and her longtime passion working with a cheetah conservation charity in South Africa. She appeared in Safari School, a reality television series, which was first broadcast on BBC Two during January and February 2007.

In November 2006, Leeming was a contestant on the sixth series of I'm a Celebrity...Get Me Out of Here! on ITV. She was evicted on the 19th day of the series where she finished 6th.

In February 2010, Leeming appeared in a celebrity episode of the dining programme Come Dine with Me for Channel 4.

In 2013, Leeming researched, wrote and presented a BBC Inside Out documentary on the World War II Free French Pilot, René Mouchotte. Through her research she met the Director of the Allied Air Forces Museum at Elvington near York. Ian Reed was able to source historic material which added to Leeming's programme. She is now a Vice President of the Museum.

In January and February 2016, Leeming appeared in the three-part BBC series The Real Marigold Hotel, which followed a group of celebrities including Miriam Margolyes and Wayne Sleep on a journey to India. In December 2017, she also appeared in the second series of The Real Marigold on Tour to Havana.

Broadcast on 2 November 2017, Leeming took part in a special celebrity edition of Channel 4's First Dates, in aid of Stand Up To Cancer.

Leeming donated the money raised in the celebrity edition to Brooke, Action for Working Horses and Donkeys.

Leeming joined Miriam Margolyes, Wayne Sleep and Bobby George in the BBC One programme The Real Marigold on Tour when they visited Cuba to look at how Cubans treat their elderly and the way the elderly spend their retirement.

In February 2019, Leeming joined Sheila Ferguson, Wayne Sleep and Paul Nicholas in the BBC One programme The Real Marigold on Tour when they visited Buenos Aires, Argentina.

== Personal life ==
Leeming has been married and divorced five times. She also had a brief relationship in the 1960s with New Zealand writer Owen Leeming, between her first and second marriages. Although they never married, she took his name by deed poll and did not change it after their separation.

== See also ==
- List of Eurovision Song Contest presenters

Preceded by Doireann Ní Bhriain	Eurovision Song Contest presenter 1982	Succeeded by Marlene Charell
