= Leyla Aliyeva (presenter) =

Azerbaijani television presenter (born 1986)

Leyla Guliyeva
- Leyla Mütəllim qızı Əliyeva
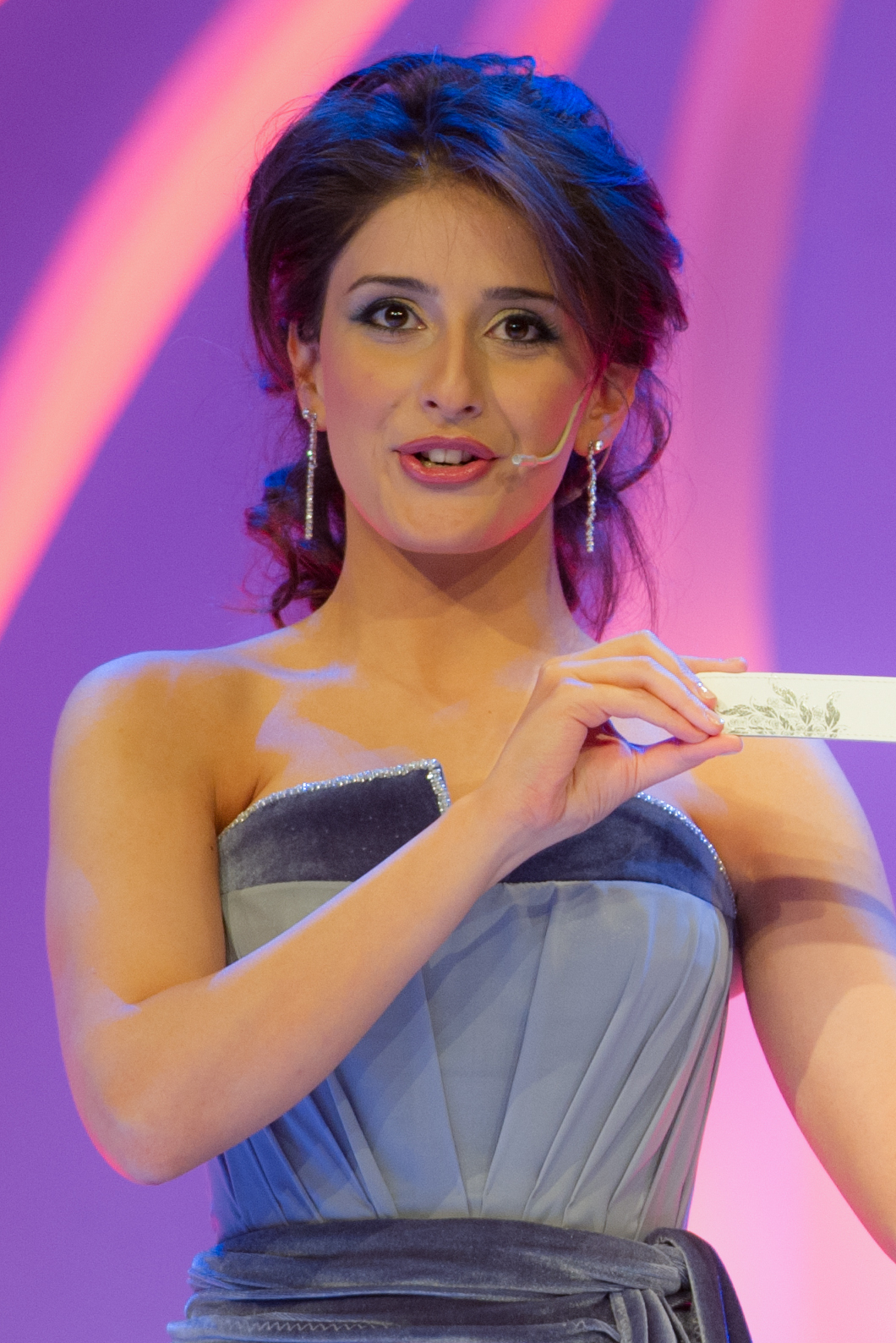
- Leyla Aliyeva in 2012
- Born: Leyla Mutallim qizi Aliyeva; 26 June 1986 (age 40); Baku, Azerbaijan SSR, Soviet Union
- Occupation: Television host

Leyla Mutallim qizi Guliyeva (née Aliyeva, Azerbaijani: Leyla Mütəllim qızı Quliyeva (Əliyeva), born 26 June 1986) is an Azerbaijani television presenter who is known for her coverage of the Eurovision Song Contest in Azerbaijan. In May 2012, she hosted the Eurovision Song Contest 2012 in Baku, Azerbaijan together with Eldar Gasimov and Nargiz Birk-Petersen. She was announced as the head of delegation for the 2020 contest, however the contest was ultimately cancelled.

== Early and personal life ==
Leyla Aliyeva was born on 26 June 1986 in Baku.

She is married to director Abbas Guliyev. They have a daughter together.

== Career ==
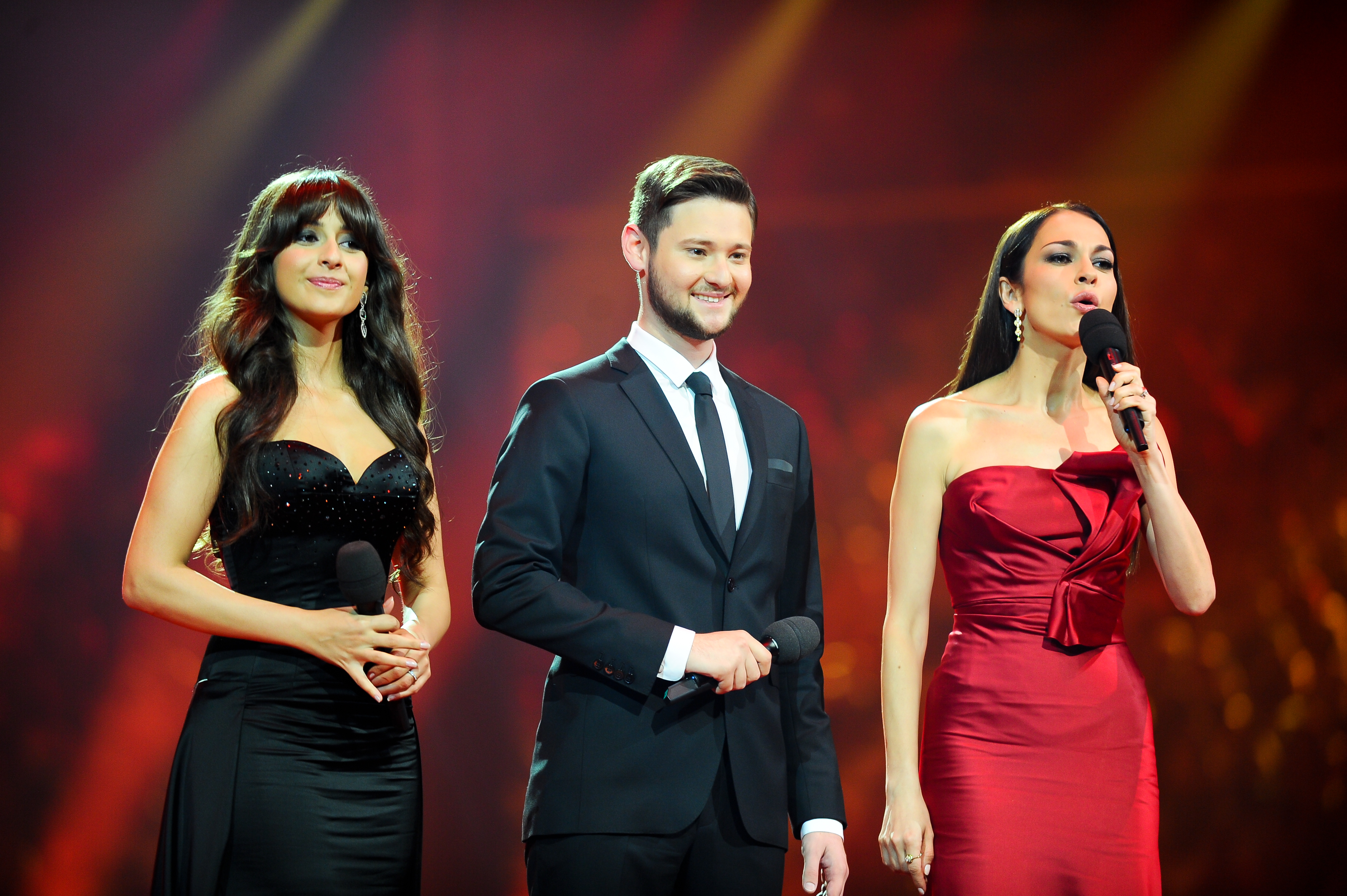
Aliyeva (left) with her Eurovision Song Contest co-hosts Eldar Gasimov and Nargiz Birk-Petersen.

Leyla Aliyeva graduated from the Baku Academy of Music with a degree in choral directing and has a master's degree in music. In 2004, during her first year of undergraduate studies, she was hired by Ictimai TV to work for the channel's Department of Music, Arts and Entertainment. In 2007, she began covering Eurovision news and soon became a member of İTV's Eurovision organising committee. Aliyeva also served as the spokesperson of Azerbaijan announcing the country's first voting results in the country's debut at the Eurovision Song Contest 2008 in Belgrade, Serbia. She hosted the Azerbaijani national Eurovision selection tours alongside Husniyya Maharramova in 2011 and 2012.

On 16 April 2012, it was announced that Aliyeva, along with Eldar Gasimov and Nargiz Birk-Petersen, would host the Eurovision Song Contest 2012 in Baku. The trio hosted the semi-finals of the contest on 22 and 24 May, followed by the final two days later.

In 2018, Aliyeva was appointed as the Head of Delegation for the Junior Eurovision Song Contest 2018. She was selected to be one of the Azerbaijani jurors for the Eurovision Song Contest 2019. In January 2020, it was announced as the head delegate for the 2020 contest, replacing her former national selection co-host Husniyya Maharramova in the role. However, the event was cancelled due to the COVID-19 pandemic.

== See also ==
- List of Eurovision Song Contest presenters

Preceded by (Germany) Anke Engelke, Judith Rakers and Stefan Raab	Eurovision Song Contest presenter 2012; With: Nargiz Birk-Petersen and Eldar Gasimov	Succeeded by (Sweden) Petra Mede
