= Ulla Essendrop =

Indian-born Danish television presenter and sports reporter (born 1976)

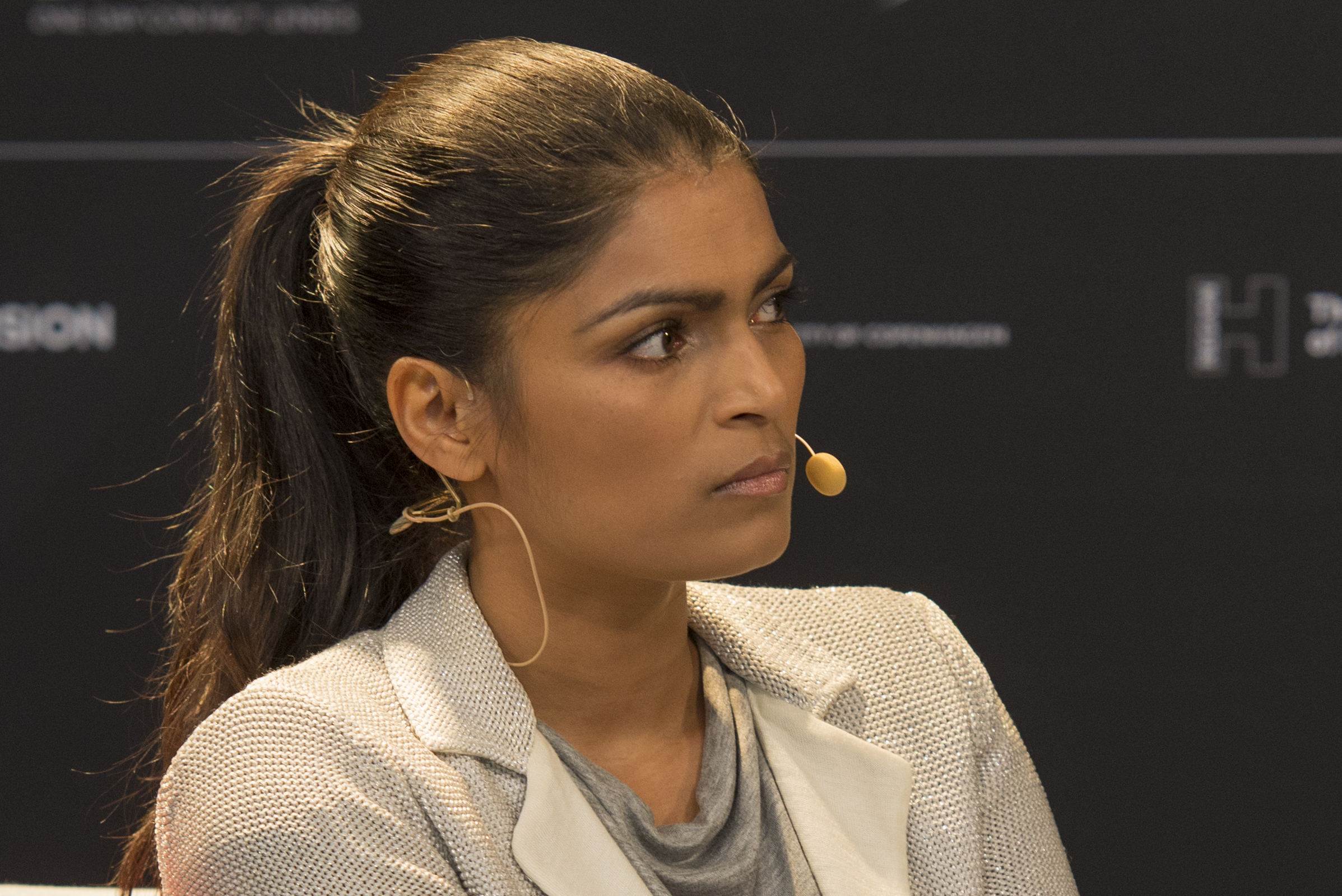
- Essendrop in 2014
- Born: 1 December 1976 (age 49); Calcutta, India
- Occupation: Television presenter

Ulla Essendrop (born 1 December 1976) is a Danish television presenter and sports reporter. She was born in Calcutta, India, but at three years old she was adopted by Danish parents and moved to Denmark. In 2013, she had her own television sports show Essendrop & Eliten. She has also worked as a sports reporter at TV2 Sporten and also hosted Rod i familien at DR1.

She hosted the semi-final allocation draw and all the press conferences for the Eurovision Song Contest 2014 in Copenhagen. Essendrop was also the Danish spokesperson for the Eurovision Song Contest 2016, Eurovision Song Contest 2017 and Eurovision Song Contest 2018.
