= Expedition Robinson 2003 =

- Season 7
- Presented by: Anders Lundin
- No. of days: 47
- No. of castaways: 24 total 14 veterans 10 challengers
- Winner: Emma Andersson
- Runner-up: Mille Lansburgh
- Location: Babi Tengah, Malaysia; Pulau Besar, Malaysia
- No. of episodes: 13

Release
- Original network: SVT1
- Original release: November 22, 2003 – February 14, 2004

Additional information
- Filming dates: May 2003 – June 2003

Season chronology
- ← Previous; 2002 Next → 2004

Expedition Robinson 2003 is the seventh version of Expedition Robinson to air in Sweden and it aired in 2003. Along with the twenty-four official contestants, there was a twenty fifth contestant, Hildegard Krebbs who was forced to leave the competition in its pre-production stage.

== Season summary ==
As this season was initially thought to be the show's last, the major twist for season was that it was to be an "Allstars" theme in which a tribe of former contestants known as the "Veterans", would take on a team of newcomers known as the "Challengers". Another twist was added midway through the pre-merge stage of the competition, a pair twist. As part of the pair twist the contestants were grouped, competed, and voted out in pairs, however following their initial elimination the two members of the pair would compete in a duel, the winner of which would stay secluded from most of the other contestants on an island, known as "Utopia", in order to compete in a series of duels to re-enter the competition.

Throughout the post-merge duration of the game, contestants, both in the game and in Utopia, would continuously swap locations based on challenge results. As a final twist eight more votes would be distributed among the two finalists based on the percent they received in a public poll. In the end, Emma Andersson won the season with a jury vote of 11–5 over Mille Lansburgh. Andersson received six of the eight public votes having garnered seventy five percent of the vote.

== Finishing order ==
Contestant	Original Tribes	Episode 3 Partner	Episode 4 Tribes (Partner)	Episode 5 Tribes (Partner)	Episode 6 Tribes (Partner)	Merged Tribe	Finish	Utopia
Birgitta Åberg; 58, Mora; Season 2, Runner-Up	Veteran Team						1st Voted Out; Day 3	
Kent Larsen; 67, Lycksele; Season 1, Runner-Up	Veteran Team						Left Competition; Day 6	
Marie-Louise "Malou" Rydin; 40, Stockholm; Season 3, 12th Place	Veteran Team						Left Competition; Day 6	
Viveca Rådman; 50, Stockholm	Challenger Team						2nd Voted Out; Day 6	
Leif Svensson; 32, Vedevåg; Season 6, 5th Place	Veteran Team						Left Competition; Day 7	
Björn Hernefeldt; 48, Ängesträsk; Season 5, 5th Place	Veteran Team						Not Chosen; For Pair; Day 7	
Sylvia Söderström; 51, Mörarp; Season 5, 16th Place	Veteran Team	Mikael					3rd Voted Out; Day 9	Lost 1st Duel; Day 10
Mikael Sandström; Returned to game	Challenger Team	Sylvia					3rd Voted Out; Day 9	
Mia Laaksonen; 25, Gothenburg; Season 2, 12th Place	Veteran Team	Vincent	South Team; Vincent				4th Voted Out; Day 12	Lost 2nd Duel; Day 13
Vincent Hamilton; Returned to game	Challenger Team	Mia	South Team; Mia				4th Voted Out; Day 12	
Madeleine "Råå" Slogs; 28, Bålsta	Challenger Team	Martin	North Team; Martin	North Team; Martin			5th Voted Out; Day 15	Lost 3rd Duel; Day 16
Martin Suorra; 52, Gällivare; Season 3, 7th Place	Veteran Team	Madeleine	North Team; Råå	North Team; Råå			5th Voted Out; Day 15	Lost Final Duel; Day 21
Daniel Insulander; Returned to game	Challenger Team	Zübeyde	South Team; Zübeyde	South Team; Zübeyde	South Team; Zübeyde		6th Voted Out; Day 18	
Zübeyde Simsek; 34, Katrineholm; Season 5, 4th Place	Veteran Team	Daniel	South Team; Daniel	South Team; Daniel	South Team; Daniel		6th Voted Out; Day 18	Refused Duel; Day 19
Camilla Eggenberger; 36, Stockholm	Challenger Team	Johan	South Team; Johan	South Team; Johan	South Team; Johan		Left Competition; Day 20	
Lars Gåre; 43, Stockholm	Challenger Team	Emma	North Team; Emma	North Team; Emma	North Team; Emma		Lost Challenge; Day 20	Lost Final Duel; Day 21
Robban Andersson; 29, Stockholm; Season 3, 3rd Place	Veteran Team	Mariana	South Team; Mariana L	South Team; Mariana L	South Team; Mariana L	Robinson	7th Voted Out; 1st Jury Member; Day 24	
Johan Hellström; 39, Umeå; Season 4, 10th Place	Veteran Team	Camilla	South Team; Camilla	South Team; Camilla	South Team; Camilla	Robinson	8th Voted Out; 2nd Jury Member; Day 27	
Vincent Hamilton; 24, Västerås	Challenger Team	Mia	South Team; Mia			Robinson	9th Voted Out; 3rd Jury Member; Day 30	Winner of "Utopia"; Duel 4
Mariana "Mirre" Dehlin; 36, Stockholm; Season 6, Runner-Up	Veteran Team	Mille	North Team; Mille	North Team; Mille	North Team; Mille	Robinson	10th Voted Out; 4th Jury Member; Day 33	
Jenny Lindström; 25, Piteå	Challenger Team	Pål	North Team; Pål	North Team; Pål	North Team; Pål	Robinson	Lost challenge Day 36	Left competition Day 37
Mikael Sandström; 44, Lindesberg	Challenger Team	Sylvia				Robinson	11th Voted Out; 5th Jury Member; Day 39	Winner of "Utopia"; Duel 6
Pål Hollender; 35, Stockholm; Season 2, 5th Place	Veteran Team	Jenny	North Team; Jenny	North Team; Jenny	North Team; Jenny	Robinson	12th Voted Out; 6th Jury Member; Day 42	Winner of "Utopia"; Duel 7
Daniel Insulander; 39, Stockholm	Challenger Team	Zübeyde	South Team; Zübeyde	South Team; Zübeyde	South Team; Zübeyde	Robinson	Lost Challenge; 7th Jury Member; Day 45	Winner of "Utopia"; Duel 5
Mariana Lundgren; 28, Stockholm	Challenger Team	Robert	South Team; Robert	South Team; Robert	South Team; Robert	Robinson	Lost Challenge; 8th Jury Member; Day 46	
Mille Lansburgh; 23, Östersund	Challenger Team	Mariana	North Team; Mariana D	North Team; Mariana D	North Team; Mariana D	Robinson	Runner-Up; Day 47	
Emma Andersson; 24, Stockholm; Season 5, 6th Place	Veteran Team	Lars	North Team; Lars	North Team; Lars	North Team; Lars	Robinson	Sole Survivor; Day 47	

== Voting history ==
	Veterans	Challengers .vs. Veterans			Mixed Tribe			North Team .vs. South Team				Merge Tribe										
Episode #:	1	2			3			4	5	6		7	8	9	10	11			12		Reunion	
Eliminated:	Brigitta; 7/14 votes	Kent; No vote	Malou; No vote	Viveca; 9/10 votes	Leif; No vote	Björn; No vote	Mikael; 6/9 votes^{1}	Vincent; 5/8 votes^{2}	Råå; 3/4 votes^{3}	Daniel; 3/6 votes^{4}	Camilla; No vote^{4}	Robban; 6/9 votes	Johan; 5/7 votes^{5}	Vincent; 4/7 votes	Mirre; 1/1 votes^{6}	Mikael; 4/5 votes	Jenny, Lars, Martin; No vote^{7}	Pål; 4/5 votes	Daniel; No vote	Mariana; No vote	Mille; 5/16 votes^{8}	Emma; 11/16 votes^{8}
Voter	Vote																					
Emma	Robban											Robban	Johan	Mirre (?)	~~Daniel~~	Mikael		Pål		Won	Jury Vote	
Mille	Not in game			Viveca			Lars		Råå			Robban	Johan	Vincent	~~Daniel~~	Mikael		Pål	Won		Jury Vote	
Mariana	Not in game			Viveca			Mikael	Vincent		Daniel		Daniel	Mirre	Mirre	~~Daniel~~	Mikael		Pål		Lost		Emma
Daniel	Not in game			Viveca			Lars	Mariana		Camilla		Robban	Johan	In Utopia	Mirre	Mikael		Pål	Lost			Emma
Pål	Brigitta											Robban		Vincent(?)	In Utopia			Daniel			Mille	
Mikael	Not in game			Viveca			Lars	In Utopia								Mille						Emma
Jenny	Not in game			Viveca			Mikael		Råå			Robban	Johan	Vincent	~~Daniel~~	In Utopia						
Mirre	Robban											Robban	Johan	Vincent	~~Daniel~~						Mille	
Vincent	Not in game			Viveca			Mikael	Mariana	In Utopia					Mirre								Emma
Johan	Brigitta							Vincent		Daniel		Daniel	Pål								Mille	
Robban	Brigitta							Vincent		Daniel		Daniel										Emma
Lars	Not in game			Viveca			Mikael		Råå			In Utopia										
Camilla	Not in game			Viveca			Mikael	Vincent		Mariana												
Zübeyde	Robban							Vincent		Camilla												
Martin	Brigitta									In Utopia												
Råå	Not in game			Viveca			Mikael		Lars													
Mia	Johan							Mariana														
Sylvia	Robban							In Utopia														
Björn	Brigitta					No Partner																
Leif	Brigitta																					
Viveca	Not in game			Råå																		
Malou	Robban																					
Kent	Brigitta																					
Brigitta	Robban																					

^1 All pairs voted for one non-veteran player that they wanted to eliminate. As Mikael received the most votes, both he and Sylvia were eliminated. Following the vote, Mikael and Sylvia faced off in a duel, the winner of which would stay in Utopia while the loser would be eliminated.
^2 At the fourth tribal council, initially only challengers could vote to eliminate another challenger player. Due to a tie, the veterans voted as well. As Vincent received the most votes, both he and Mia were eliminated. Following the vote, Mia and Vincent faced off in a duel, the winner of which would stay in Utopia while the loser would be eliminated.
^3 At the fifth tribal council, only the challengers could vote to eliminate another challenger player. As Råå received the most votes, both she and Martin were eliminated. Following the vote, Martin and Råå faced off in a duel, the winner of which would stay in Utopia while the loser would be eliminated.
^4 At the sixth tribal council, initially only challengers could vote to eliminate another challenger player. Due to a tie, the veterans voted as well. As Daniel received the most votes, both he and Zübeyde were eliminated. Following the vote, Camilla decided to leave the show and Zübeyde refused the duel so Daniel returned to the South team.
^5 At the eighth tribal council, Pål could not vote as he was being punished for breaking a rule.
^6 As a twist, following the tenth tribal council vote it was revealed that the person who received the most votes would have the sole vote to eliminate.
^7 In episode twelve, all contestants left in Utopia competed in a final duel for a spot in the final five.
^8 As a final twist, along with the eight jury votes cast by the jury members the Swedish public was allowed to vote for who they wanted to win. The percentage of votes each of the finalists received would then be split up amongst the two as eight jury votes
