= Ljusnarsberg Municipality =

Ljusnarsberg Municipality Ljusnarsbergs kommun
- Municipality
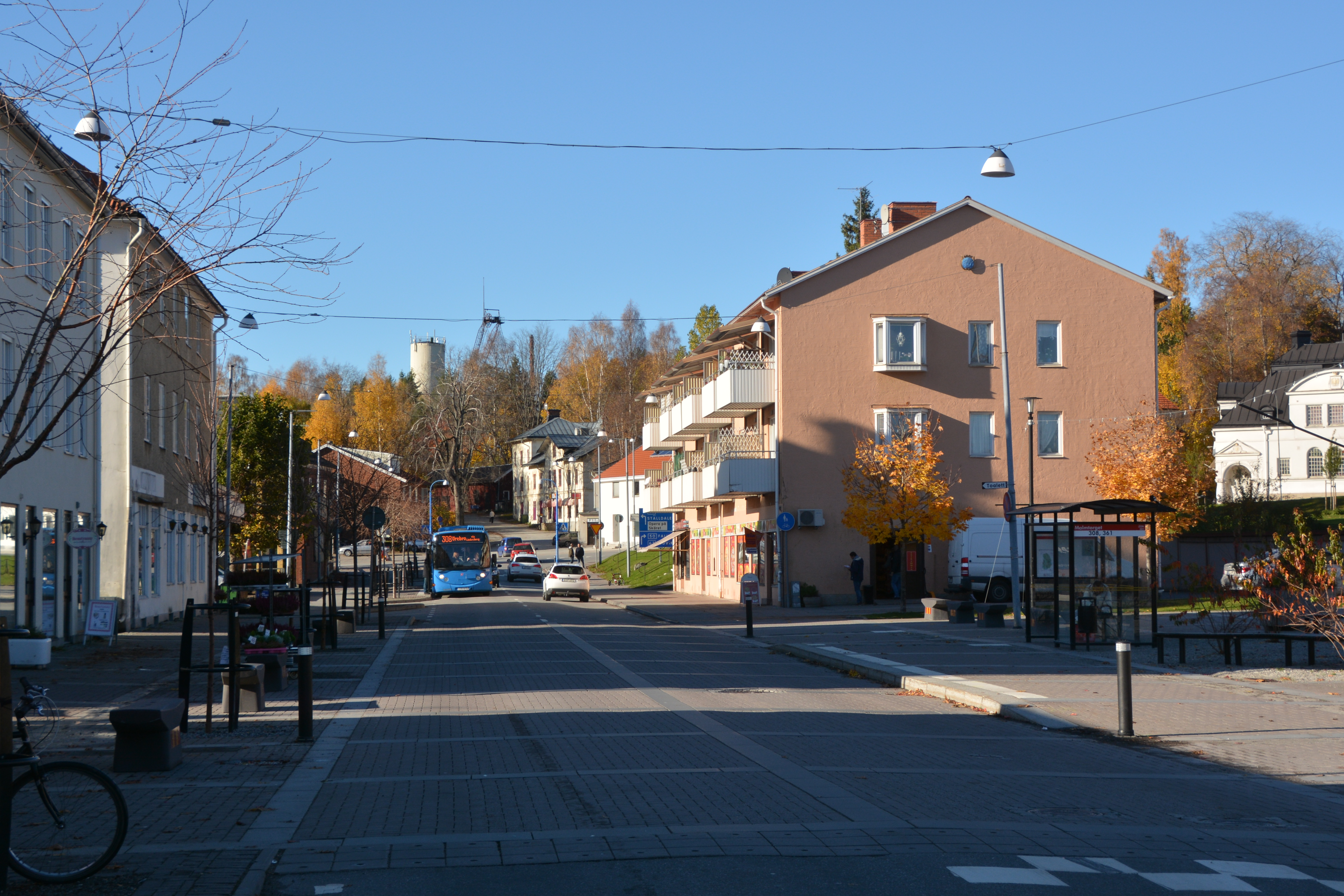

- Coat of arms

- Coordinates: 59°52′N 14°59′E
- Country: Sweden
- County: Örebro County
- Seat: Kopparberg

Area
  - Total: 631.08 km^{2} (243.66 sq mi)
  - Land: 575.54 km^{2} (222.22 sq mi)
  - Water: 55.54 km^{2} (21.44 sq mi)
- Area as of 1 January 2014.

Population (30 June 2025)
  - Total: 4,329
  - Density: 7.522/km^{2} (19.48/sq mi)
- Time zone: UTC+1 (CET)
  - Summer (DST): UTC+2 (CEST)
- ISO 3166 code: SE
- Province: Västmanland
- Municipal code: 1864
- Website: www.ljusnarsberg.se

Ljusnarsberg Municipality (Swedish: Ljusnarsbergs kommun) is a municipality in Örebro County in central Sweden. Its seat is located in the town of Kopparberg.

In 1908 Kopparberg was detached from the rural municipality Ljusnarsberg to form a market town (köping). In 1962 they were reunited.

It was the birthplace of Hjalmar Andersson, a Swedish cross-country runner.

== Geography ==
Kopparberg is located by the outlet of the Arboga River, about 80 km north of Örebro. The municipality borders the province or landskap Dalarna to the north. One of the highest points is the mountain Gillersklack which is a popular winter resort with both downhill and cross country skiing. Ljusnarsberg lies in a mountainous mid-lower-central district of Sweden named Bergslagen (Berg = mountain, lag = law). While Swedish municipalities typically are named after their seat, Ljusnarsberg got a different name due to Dalarna County to its north being known as Kopparberg County after a Falun copper mine until 1997.

The area has historically been a mining district.

=== Localities ===
Town with over 50 inhabitants:

- Kopparberg, including Bångbro 3,300 (seat)
- Ställdalen 736
- Stjärnfors
- Ställberg
- Högfors
- Mossgruvan
- Hörken
- Bastkärn
- Silverhöjden
- Yxsjöberg

== Economy ==
One of the largest industries is the Kopparbergs Brewery, making beer and cider distributed both nation- and worldwide, and is known brand of that kind in Sweden.

The municipality is part of a regional KNÖL-group (acronym for Kommuner i Norra Örebro Län), consisting of Ljusnarsberg Municipality, Nora Municipality, Lindesberg Municipality and Hällefors Municipality.

== Riksdag elections ==
Year	%	Votes	V	S	MP	C	L	KD	M	SD	NyD	Left	Right
1973	88.5	4,649	7.7	59.3		21.1	4.7	2.0	4.9			67.0	30.8
1976	89.6	4,776	6.3	58.2		23.0	3.9	1.6	6.8			64.5	33.7
1979	89.3	4,736	7.7	58.1		18.4	4.9	1.7	9.1			65.8	32.4
1982	90.4	4,723	7.4	60.4	1.5	14.7	3.3	2.2	10.4			67.8	28.4
1985	87.5	4,520	8.7	57.7	1.4	12.4	8.7		11.1			66.3	32.1
1988	83.0	4,082	9.7	56.4	5.4	9.9	7.8	2.4	8.2			71.5	26.0
1991	83.6	4,099	8.6	49.5	2.9	8.9	5.7	5.1	10.2		8.5	58.1	29.8
1994	84.7	4,102	12.3	56.3	4.3	7.9	4.1	2.2	10.8		1.5	72.9	25.0
1998	76.4	3,629	19.7	47.7	4.1	6.4	2.1	7.8	10.7			71.5	27.0
2002	74.4	3,172	12.3	51.8	3.4	10.8	6.0	6.2	7.2	1.7		67.5	30.1
2006	76.3	3,119	8.9	48.4	3.4	10.3	3.1	3.8	14.5	5.9		60.7	31.7
2010	80.5	3,170	7.9	44.4	4.5	5.5	3.2	3.6	19.4	9.6		56.8	31.7
2014	83.7	3,130	6.6	42.0	3.3	5.1	2.3	2.2	12.3	23.7		51.9	21.9
2018	83.7	3,000	7.0	33.8	1.9	6.0	2.7	4.2	11.3	31.2		48.7	49.4

== Demographics ==
This is a demographic table based on Ljusnarsberg Municipality's electoral districts in the 2022 Swedish general election sourced from SVT's election platform, in turn taken from SCB official statistics.

In total there were 4,598 residents with 3,568 Swedish citizen adults eligible to vote. The political demographics were 43.2% for the left bloc and 54.5% for the right bloc. Ljusnarsberg is a low-income municipality with high levels of unemployment and relatively few college graduates. There is a relatively high proportion of people with foreign background at about 23%, quite evenly spread throughout the districts. Indicators are in percentage points except population totals and income.

Location	Residents	Citizen adults	Left vote	Right vote	Employed	Swedish parents	Foreign heritage	Income SEK	Degree
Location			%	%					
Bångbro	634	507	36.7	62.1	71	83	17	20,382	20
Hörken	673	548	37.7	60.5	66	77	23	19,252	23
Kyrkbacksskolan	1,290	1,017	47.9	50.2	75	81	19	22,549	22
Ställdalen	545	389	33.8	62.3	68	74	26	20,376	23
Tingshuset	1,456	1,107	53.6	44.7	65	73	27	18,225	21
Source: SVT

== See also ==
- Independent Municipal Party of Ljusnarsberg
