= Storå =

Storå may refer to the following locations:

- Storå, Norway, a small village in Tysfjord Municipality, Nordland County, Norway
- Storå, Sweden, a village in Lindesberg Municipality, Örebro County, Sweden
- Storå, Denmark, a creek in Denmark's West Jutland
- Storå is also the Swedish name of Isojoki in Finland
