= Rockhammar =

- Location within Örebro Location within Sweden
- Coordinates: 59°32′N 15°27′E
- Country: Sweden
- Province: Västmanland
- County: Örebro County
- Municipality: Lindesberg Municipality

Area
  - Total: 1.0 km^{2} (0.39 sq mi)

Population (31 December 2010)
  - Total: 270
  - Density: 271/km^{2} (700/sq mi)
- Time zone: UTC+1 (CET)
  - Summer (DST): UTC+2 (CEST)

Rockhammar is a locality situated in Lindesberg Municipality, Örebro County, Sweden with 270 inhabitants in 2010.
