= Expedition Robinson 2002 =

- Season 6
- Presented by: Anders Lundin
- No. of days: 47
- No. of castaways: 17
- Winner: Antoni Matacz
- Runner-up: Mariana Dehlin
- Location: Pulau Besar, Malaysia
- No. of episodes: 13

Release
- Original network: SVT1
- Original release: November 16, 2002 – February 8, 2003

Additional information
- Filming dates: May 2002 – July 2002

Season chronology
- ← Previous; 2001 Next → 2003

Expedition Robinson 2002 is the sixth edition of the Swedish version of Expedition Robinson.

As a special twist for the sixth season, the players were divided into tribes by gender with the exception of Camilla and Charles, who were deemed "leaders" of their respective tribes. Along with the title of leader came immunity. In episode four a tribal swap took place and there were no longer leaders and the immunity given to the original leaders was usurped.

Another major twist this season was that of Utopia, a separate island. On Utopia, two competitors who had already been eliminated would compete for a chance to return to the game. Mariana eventually won the final island duel and was allowed back into the game. Antoni Matacz ultimately won the season with a jury vote of 5–4 over Mariana Dehlin.

== Finishing order ==
Contestant	Original Tribes	Tribal Swap	Merged Tribe	Finish	Utopia
Martina Lundgren; 36, Katrineholm	North Team			1st Voted Out; Day 3	Lost 1st Duel; Day 7
Anna Sommerfeld Marsh; 27, Gothenburg	North Team			2nd Voted Out; Day 6	Lost 2nd Duel; Day 10
Jennie Ekstrand; 24, Gothenburg	North Team			3rd Voted Out; Day 9	Lost 3rd Duel; Day 13
Annelie Wernholm; 46, Linköping	North Team	North Team		5th Voted Out; Day 15	Lost 4th Duel; Day 16
Camilla Karlsson; 32, Gotland	South Team	South Team		6th Voted Out; Day 18	Refused Duel; Day 19
Tanja Tabrizian; 21, Gothenburg	North Team	South Team		7th Voted Out; Day 21	Lost 5th Duel; Day 22
Nicklas Lindecrantz; 34, Söderköping	South Team	North Team	Robinson	Left Competition; 1st Jury Member; Day 22	
Freddie Larsson; 28, Gothenburg	South Team	North Team	Robinson	8th Voted Out; 2nd Jury Member; Day 24	Lost 6th Duel; Day 25
Charles Murelius; 32, Stockholm	North Team	North Team	Robinson	4th Voted Out; 3rd Jury Member; Day 12	Lost 7th Duel; Day 28
Augustin Dupal; 34, Stockholm	South Team	North Team	Robinson	9th Voted Out; 4th Jury Member; Day 30	Lost 8th Duel; Day 31
Mariana "Mirre" Dehlin; Returned Day 45	North Team	South Team	Robinson	10th Voted Out; Day 27	
Anna Stenlund; 24, Vaasa, Finland	North Team	North Team	Robinson	11th Voted Out; 5th Jury Member; Day 33	Lost 9th Duel; Day 34
Nemah Hansson; 36, Edsbyn	North Team	South Team	Robinson	12th Voted Out; 6th Jury Member; Day 36	Refused Duel; Day 39
Leif Svensson; 30, Vedevåg	South Team	South Team	Robinson	13th Voted Out; 7th Jury Member; Day 42	Lost 10th Duel; Day 45
Erold Westman; 47, Storuman	South Team	South Team	Robinson	Lost Challenge; 8th Jury Member; Day 46	
Patric Sjöström; 33, Stockholm	South Team	South Team	Robinson	Lost Challenge; 9th Jury Member; Day 46	
Mariana "Mirre" Dehlin; 34, Stockholm	North Team	South Team	Robinson	Runner-Up; Day 47	"Utopia" Winner
Antoni Matacz; 36, Örebro	South Team	South Team	Robinson	Sole Survivor; Day 47	

== Voting history ==
	Original Tribes			Tribal Swap					Merged Tribe											
Episode #:	1	2	3	4		5	6	7			8	9	10	11	12	13				
Eliminated:	Martina; 4/9 votes	Anna So; 4/8 votes	Jennie; 4/7 votes	Tie	Charles; 3/4 votes	Annelie; 3/5 votes	Camilla; 6/8 votes	Tanja; 5/7 votes	Nicklas; No vote	Freddie; 6/10 votes	Augustin; 6/9 votes	Mirre; 5/8 votes	Anne St; 4/7 votes	Nemah; 5/6 votes	Leif; 3/5 votes	Leif; No vote	Erold; No vote	Patric; No vote	Mirre; 4/9 votes	Antoni; 5/9 votes
Voter	Vote																			
Antoni							Camilla	Tanja		Freddie	Augustin	Mirre	Anna St; Nemah	Nemah; Nemah	Leif; Erold		2nd	Won	Jury Vote	
Mirre	Martina	Anna So	Jennie				Nemah	Antoni		Augustin	Nemah	Nemah	In Utopia				Won		Jury Vote	
Patric							Camilla	Tanja		Freddie	Augustin	Mirre	Anna St	Nemah	Leif		3rd	Lost		Antoni
Erold							Camilla	Tanja		Freddie	Augustin	Mirre	Anna St	Nemah	Leif		Lost			Antoni
Leif							Camilla	Tanja		Freddie	Augustin	Mirre; Nemah	Nemah	Nemah	Patric	In Utopia			Mirre	
Nemah	?	Anna So	Jennie				Camilla	Tanja		Freddie	Augustin	Mirre	Anna St	Patric						Antoni
Anna St	Tanja	Anna So	Jennie	Charles	Charles	Nicklas				Augustin	Nemah	Nemah	Nemah	In Utopia					Mirre	
Augustin				Nicklas	Nicklas	Annelie				Freddie	Nemah	In Utopia								Antoni
Freddie				Nicklas	Charles	Annelie				Augustin	In Utopia								Mirre	
Nicklas				Charles	None	Annelie													Mirre	
Tanja	?	Annelie	Annelie				Camilla	Antoni	In Utopia											
Camilla							Antoni													
Annelie	?	Anna So	Jennie	Charles	Charles	Nicklas	In Utopia													
Charles	Annelie	Anna St	Annelie	Nicklas	None	In Utopia				Anna St	Anna St	In Utopia								Antoni
Jennie	?	Anna St	Annelie	In Utopia																
Anna So	?	Anna St	In Utopia																	
Martina	?	In Utopia																		
