= Frövi =

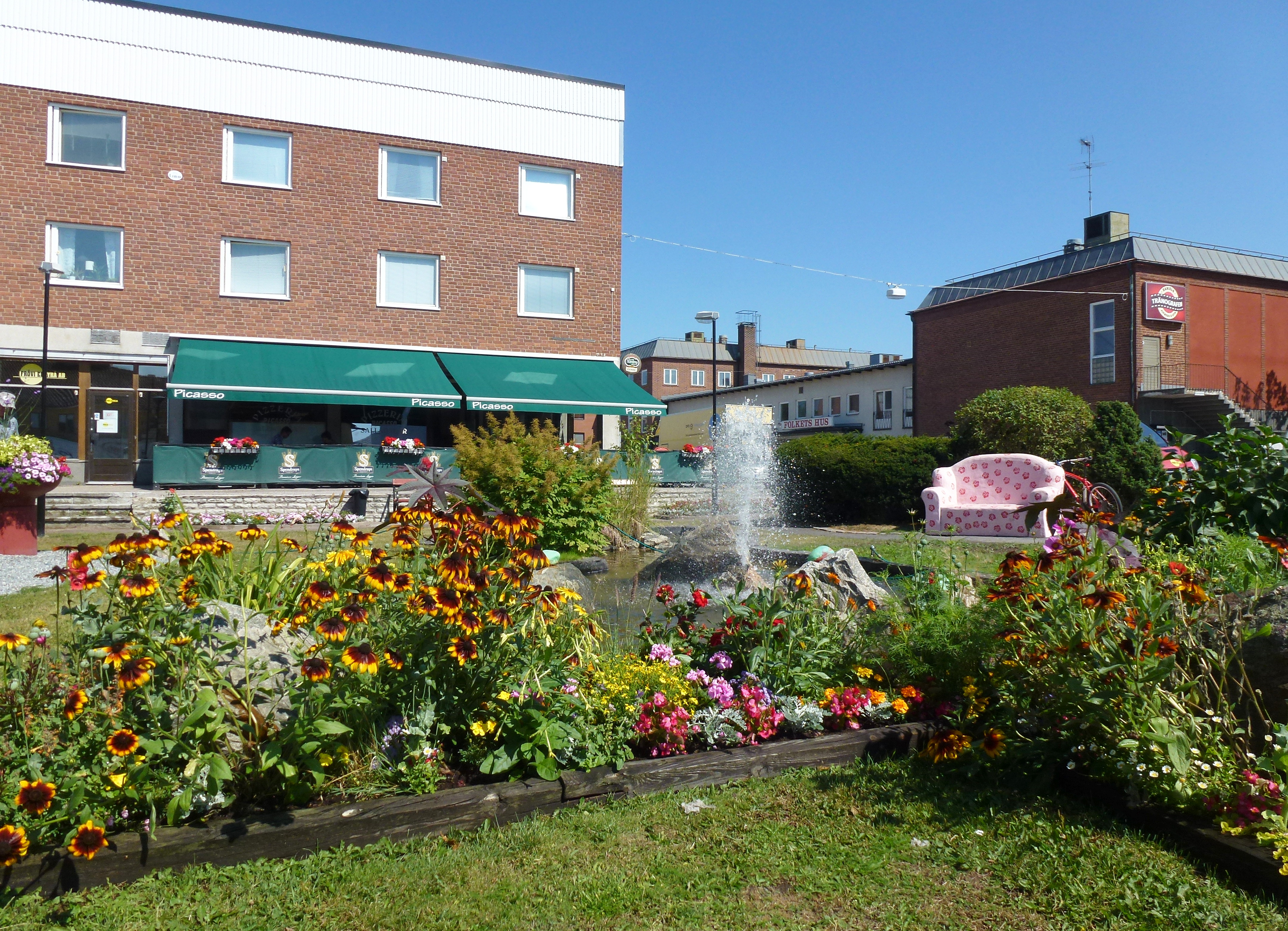

- Location within Örebro Location within Sweden
- Coordinates: 59°28′N 15°22′E
- Country: Sweden
- Province: Västmanland
- County: Örebro County
- Municipality: Lindesberg Municipality

Area
  - Total: 3.66 km^{2} (1.41 sq mi)

Population (31 December 2010)
  - Total: 2,516
  - Density: 688/km^{2} (1,780/sq mi)
- Time zone: UTC+1 (CET)
  - Summer (DST): UTC+2 (CEST)

Frövi is a locality situated in Lindesberg Municipality, Örebro County, Sweden with 2,516 inhabitants in 2010.

== Riksdag elections ==
Year	%	Votes	V	S	MP	C	L	KD	M	SD	NyD	Left	Right
1973	91.2	1,988	4.0	52.2		28.3	5.9	2.5	7.0			56.1	41.3
1976	91.7	2,018	2.9	51.7		27.5	6.6	1.9	9.2			54.7	43.3
1979	91.1	2,113	2.8	54.4		20.4	7.1	3.7	11.4			57.2	38.9
1982	91.8	2,188	4.1	55.9	0.9	17.0	5.2	3.2	13.9			60.0	36.0
1985	89.6	2,187	4.9	55.3	1.0	16.2	9.6		12.1			60.2	37.9
1988	86.6	2,095	4.8	55.4	2.7	13.4	10.1	4.1	9.2			62.9	32.7
1991	86.9	2,123	5.8	49.9	1.2	10.0	8.3	8.4	10.6		5.6	55.7	37.3
1994	87.7	2,171	5.9	58.0	3.5	9.4	4.7	4.7	12.6		0.6	67.4	31.3
1998	80.4	1,922	13.1	49.7	2.7	7.2	2.9	10.8	12.4			65.5	33.3
2002	78.8	1,868	7.5	55.6	3.1	9.9	6.7	7.3	7.4	2.1		66.2	31.3
2006	80.6	1,889	5.7	50.4	3.3	10.4	4.2	5.6	14.1	4.4		59.4	34.4
2010	83.4	2,193	4.7	44.5	4.0	8.1	5.3	4.7	20.6	7.3		53.2	38.7
2014	87.3	2,257	4.6	43.1	4.3	7.0	2.4	3.6	16.7	16.2		52.0	29.7
2018	86.8	2,219	5.6	36.3	1.8	7.7	2.9	6.3	14.7	23.3		51.4	47.2
