= Fryggesboda =

- Location within Örebro Location within Sweden
- Coordinates: 59°31′30″N 15°17′20″E
- Country: Sweden
- Municipality: Lindesberg Municipality
- County: Örebro County
- Province: Västmanland
- Time zone: UTC+1 (CET)
  - Summer (DST): UTC+2 (CEST)

Fryggesboda is a small locality with a handful of households situated in Lindesberg Municipality, Örebro County, Sweden.
