= Gusselby =

- Location within Örebro Location within Sweden
- Coordinates: 59°38′30″N 15°14′00″E
- Country: Sweden
- Province: Västmanland
- County: Örebro County
- Municipality: Lindesberg Municipality

Area
  - Total: 0.86 km^{2} (0.33 sq mi)

Population (31 December 2010)
  - Total: 300
  - Density: 349/km^{2} (900/sq mi)
- Time zone: UTC+1 (CET)
  - Summer (DST): UTC+2 (CEST)

Gusselby is a locality situated in Lindesberg Municipality, Örebro County, Sweden with 300 inhabitants in 2010.
