= Kopparberg =

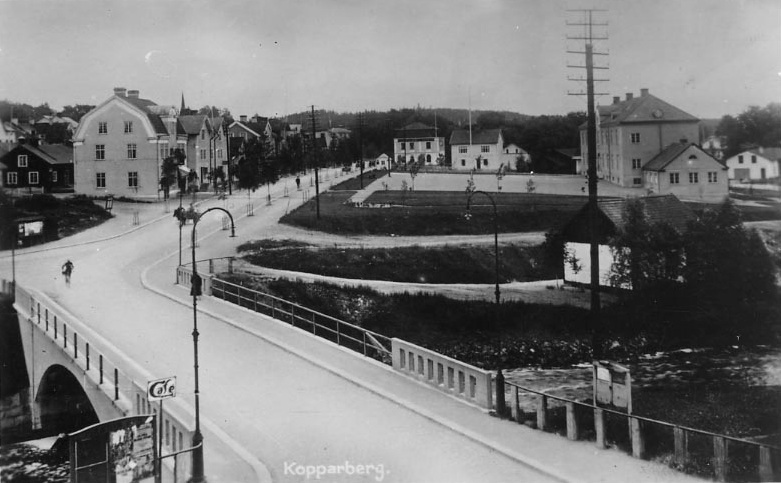
- Kopparberg in 1920s

- Location within Örebro Location within Sweden
- Coordinates: 59°52′N 14°59′E
- Country: Sweden
- Province: Västmanland
- County: Örebro County
- Municipality: Ljusnarsberg Municipality

Area
  - Total: 6.73 km^{2} (2.60 sq mi)

Population (31 December 2015)
  - Total: 4,200
- Time zone: UTC+1 (CET)
  - Summer (DST): UTC+2 (CEST)

Kopparberg is a locality and the seat of Ljusnarsberg Municipality, Örebro County, Sweden, with 4,200 inhabitants in 2015. It is famous for one of the most valuable postage stamps in the world, the Treskilling Yellow from 13 July 1857, Kopparberg's wooden church (voted No. 1 in Sweden in 2006), and Kopparberg Cider, now one of the best selling ciders in the UK and worldwide.

This name is traditionally associated with Falun, some 90 km to the north, and gave its name to Kopparbergs län (Kopparberg County, now called Dalarna County) and the 700-year-old mining company Stora Kopparberg, which is now part of Stora Enso. However, the town was founded as late as 1635 with the name Nya Kopparberget. It was named after the copper mines that were, in the 18th century, a major supply of the world's copper, and a considerable contributor to the Swedish national economy. Kopparberg lies on a major north–south road, 80 km north of Sweden's sixth most populous city, Örebro. Örebro is in the middle of Sweden, lying on the east–west 500 km/300 mile E18/E20 highway and also railway lines that directly connect Stockholm, Sweden, to Oslo, Norway. These are some of the busiest in Sweden.

== Population ==
Kopparberg has approximately 4,200 inhabitants, although its population has been steadily declining over the past 40 years. The population is ageing as the young people move away to education, jobs, and a more entertaining life in the larger cities, Örebro University and the Kopparberg Brewery being the major attractions for many. However people born in Kopparberg tend to return as they get older. Almost 10% of the inhabitants are immigrants. This is due to the influx of immigrants the town receives through the auspices of the Swedish Government. Politically, it has a somewhat higher concentration of those who favour the Miljöpartiet (Environmental or Green Party) and the Vänsterpartiet (former Communist Party).

== Geography ==
Kopparberg lies in a mountainous mid-lower-central district of Sweden named Bergslagen, after the regional laws and customs prevailing there. Another name applied to the region is mellansverige = middle Sweden. This particular region was one of the last to be settled in Sweden. Certain varieties of plant and mushroom are only found in their particular forms in Bergslagen.

== Climate ==
The Bergslagen area is comparatively cool compared to lowland areas further south in the county such as Örebro. Kopparberg has a cool humid continental climate due to recent mildening of the climate. In the 1961–1990 reference period the nearest weather station at nearby locality Ställdalen indicated a maritime type of a subarctic climate.

Although Kopparberg is slightly further south, it is located at a slightly higher elevation 6 kilometres (3.7 mi) south-east, rendering likely values very similar. Winter highs usually average just below freezing, and frosts are frequent from October through April. Summers are very tempered, compared to both the Mälar Valley to the south and east and central Dalarna to the north. The warmest recorded temperature of 34.2 °C (93.6 °F) is still high by Swedish standards, courtesy of the unpredictability of its far inland position.

Climate data for Kopparberg–Ställdalen (2002–2018 averages; 1967–1990 precipitation, extremes since 1967)
Month	Jan	Feb	Mar	Apr	May	Jun	Jul	Aug	Sep	Oct	Nov	Dec	Year
Record high °C (°F)	8.1 (46.6)	11.9 (53.4)	17.1 (62.8)	24.8 (76.6)	27.3 (81.1)	32.8 (91.0)	32.0 (89.6)	34.2 (93.6)	25.0 (77.0)	20.0 (68.0)	12.0 (53.6)	9.8 (49.6)	34.2 (93.6)
Mean maximum °C (°F)	4.7 (40.5)	5.8 (42.4)	11.9 (53.4)	17.3 (63.1)	23.5 (74.3)	25.7 (78.3)	27.7 (81.9)	25.9 (78.6)	20.4 (68.7)	14.4 (57.9)	9.4 (48.9)	5.7 (42.3)	28.7 (83.7)
Mean daily maximum °C (°F)	−1.6 (29.1)	−0.9 (30.4)	3.7 (38.7)	9.9 (49.8)	15.5 (59.9)	19.1 (66.4)	21.7 (71.1)	19.7 (67.5)	15.1 (59.2)	8.1 (46.6)	3.1 (37.6)	−0.2 (31.6)	9.4 (49.0)
Daily mean °C (°F)	−4.2 (24.4)	−3.9 (25.0)	−0.5 (31.1)	4.8 (40.6)	10.0 (50.0)	13.8 (56.8)	16.5 (61.7)	15.5 (59.9)	10.9 (51.6)	5.0 (41.0)	0.9 (33.6)	−2.7 (27.1)	5.5 (41.9)
Mean daily minimum °C (°F)	−6.8 (19.8)	−6.8 (19.8)	−4.6 (23.7)	−0.3 (31.5)	4.5 (40.1)	8.4 (47.1)	11.4 (52.5)	10.3 (50.5)	6.7 (44.1)	1.8 (35.2)	−1.3 (29.7)	−5.2 (22.6)	1.5 (34.7)
Mean minimum °C (°F)	−18.1 (−0.6)	−16.6 (2.1)	−13.4 (7.9)	−6.7 (19.9)	−2.2 (28.0)	3.1 (37.6)	5.9 (42.6)	4.4 (39.9)	−0.3 (31.5)	−5.6 (21.9)	−9.9 (14.2)	−15.2 (4.6)	−20.8 (−5.4)
Record low °C (°F)	−30.0 (−22.0)	−30.0 (−22.0)	−26.2 (−15.2)	−21.5 (−6.7)	−9.5 (14.9)	−2.3 (27.9)	0.5 (32.9)	−1.1 (30.0)	−6.1 (21.0)	−14.2 (6.4)	−22.2 (−8.0)	−27.0 (−16.6)	−30.0 (−22.0)
Average precipitation mm (inches)	66.4 (2.61)	46.9 (1.85)	37.9 (1.49)	40.1 (1.58)	62.8 (2.47)	84.8 (3.34)	94.8 (3.73)	97.3 (3.83)	63.5 (2.50)	76.1 (3.00)	70.1 (2.76)	65.3 (2.57)	806 (31.73)
Source 1: SMHI Open Data for Ställdalen
Source 2: SMHI average data 2002–2018

== Tourism ==
=== Sightseeing ===
Among the sights are Kopparberg's Church, Gillersklack (ski sports, walking, pools), Finngruvan (the copper mines), and the natural environment of the area. Nearby is Kloten, a well-established recreation and hunting area. Some neighbours from the eastern side of the Baltic Sea are attracted in the summer every year by the available harvests of lingonberries, a small, ground growing version of cranberry, and by bilberries. They come and pick berries by the bucket, and some sell them in Sweden, and others take them back to their native countries, or something else.

=== Culture and events ===
Kopparbergs Marknad (Fair) is held on the last weekend of September. It has been billed as the third largest annual fair in Sweden. Around 125,000 people attend this, depending on the weather. The event starts on Friday afternoon (the carnival is held on Friday evening, lasting until midnight) and the fair continues until Sunday afternoon. A variety of items are sold, including clothing, footwear, jewellery, electrical, cooking and household goods, DVDs, CDs, tapes, second-hand books, magazines and food, including hot, fresh corn-on-the-cob. Some live entertainment is available too.

Annually, in late June or early July, the town is host to a gold panning contest. The Swedish Gold Panning Championship has been held here several times, and Kopparberg has also hosted the World Gold Panning Championship.

Once per year, generally in June, a gem and mineral show, billed as the largest in Europe, is held in the northern part of the town.

Opera på Skäret is home to a cultural association, and is situated in the northwest part of the town, where it hosts concerts and events.

13 July every year is a special day, commemorating the Treskilling Yellow stamp. The stamp is one of the most valuable postage stamps in the world, and it was minted in Kopparberg on 13 July 1857.

== Transportation ==
=== Bus ===
Kopparberg is reachable from the north or south via the local bus company LänsTrafiken, based in Örebro (1.5 hours), and a national bus line, Swebus, from destinations throughout Sweden.

=== Train ===
Kopparberg is connected by train to Örebro (80 km, journey time approximately 1 hour) and Hallsberg (108 km) to the south, and Ludvika (40 km), Borlänge (90 km), and Falun (120 km) to the north.

== Business life ==
The largest company in Kopparberg town is Kopparbergs Brewery, with around 150 employees. Independently owned by the Bronsman family, the brewery has gone on to produce the UK's number 1 fruit cider and the most recognisable fruit cider in the world - listed in 37 countries worldwide. Business seems to have diversified slightly over the last 10 years.

== Kopparberg's economics ==
The first employment in the area came about because of the mines. At that time it was mining, smelting, and various general supportive enterprises which formed the basis of the town.

Later metal products and manufacturing came into vogue. B. Nilsson AB's Bandstål (band = strip, stål = steel) manufacturing and sales is still in business today, situated in the business park to the south of town, called Bångbro (bång = bang, bro = bridge), so-called because it lies south of the bridge, in an area notable for industries whose work involved repetitive banging noises.

More recently, one of the town's best established and most significant employers is the Kopparbergs Brewery, owned by two brothers, which manufactures various alcoholic drinks. Kopparberg Premium Cider is one of their brands of Swedish fruit ciders, first launched in 1997, which is exported to United States of America, United Kingdom, Finland and the Republic of Ireland amongst other countries. The ciders are manufactured with an alcohol content that varies from 0 to 8.5%. Many flavours are in production, but the most widely distributed are Apple, Pear and Raspberry/Blackcurrant (although strawberry is gaining in popularity). The pear cider is sold by IKEA in a non-alcoholic version in many countries. The brewery also makes Sofiero Original, which has been the most popular beer in Sweden since its release in 2003.

More recently, a foreign company, called QXL, came to do an Internet bid-on-products until deadline auction service (eBay-type) business from Kopparberg. PC Express bought the firm and used the warehouse, but later moved the business to Sweden's capital Stockholm.

== History ==
=== Kopparberg's mines ===
According to current research, an ancient meteor landed approximately 14.5 million years ago to the west-northwest of the city. This area is particularly rich in certain minerals, and a most diverse variety of minerals is to be found in the region. Copper was discovered on the surface no later than 1634 on the hills that now form part of the town of Kopparberg, itself, and stretch out to the north. Word quickly spread of the richness of the copper veins. As mining, particularly in the winter, was hard and difficult, and the Finns were acclimatized to hard work under cold conditions, they readily took to mining and refining this rich source of copper. The largest mine is called Finngruvan (Fin = Finland or Finns, gruvan = the mine), which lies just outside the town, proper, to the north. The veins were almost completely pure copper, with trace amounts of silver and gold.

=== Kopparberg's church ===
In the old days, the church was the centre of all local activity on Sundays. Kopparberg's church was begun in 1635, and the first incarnation was completed shortly thereafter. The church was voted as the most beautiful church in Sweden in a voting held by the Swedish magazine Året Runt in February 2006. The church is named Ljusnarsbergs Kyrka after the parish Ljusnarsberg.

In 1674 a residence for the clock (bells) keeper was created, called Klockargården (klock = bell, gården = plot). That site serves today as the headquarters and school for KomVux, a multi-purpose educational institution for those training for new work, those out of work, and immigrants. You can notice the age of the building by how you have to stoop to go through the inner doors between rooms. People were shorter in olden days.

=== Ljusnarsberg architecture ===
Most old buildings are log cabins or other wooden houses (trähus in Swedish). These are mostly protected by red stain produced from the mines of the name of Kopparberg in Falun. This stain is universal in Sweden and all the barns are painted with Falun Red, with very few exceptions. This gives the landscape a uniform effect: Grass is green and barns and houses are red. Later, many of these, not all, came to be covered with mortar, stucco, and other sidings, giving them even more cold resistance and durability. Many of these buildings from hundreds of years ago are still standing and quite functional.

== See also ==
- Svealand
- Bergslagen
- Treskilling Yellow
