= Ramsberg =

- Location within Örebro Location within Sweden
- Coordinates: 59°46′N 15°18′E
- Country: Sweden
- Province: Västmanland
- County: Örebro County
- Municipality: Lindesberg Municipality

Area
  - Total: 1.28 km^{2} (0.49 sq mi)

Population (31 December 2010)
  - Total: 257
  - Density: 201/km^{2} (520/sq mi)
- Time zone: UTC+1 (CET)
  - Summer (DST): UTC+2 (CEST)

Ramsberg (Swedish pronunciation: [ˈrǎmsbærj]) is a locality situated in Lindesberg Municipality, Örebro County, Sweden with 257 inhabitants in 2010.

== Riksdag elections ==
Year	%	Votes	V	S	MP	C	L	KD	M	SD	NyD	Left	Right
1973	88.9	762	2.0	51.4		30.3	4.6	6.2	5.2			53.4	40.2
1976	94.0	790	3.7	50.1		30.0	3.9	4.7	7.6			53.8	41.5
1979	90.6	751	3.5	53.1		24.6	6.1	4.7	7.9			56.6	38.6
1982	89.7	730	2.6	54.9	2.2	21.0	2.1	5.8	11.5			57.5	34.5
1985	90.1	688	3.3	54.1	2.9	21.5	6.5		11.5			57.4	39.5
1988	83.7	618	4.4	49.7	6.1	18.9	5.5	6.3	9.1			60.2	33.5
1991	85.3	628	4.5	45.9	4.1	16.2	3.3	11.0	12.1		2.9	50.3	42.7
1994	88.5	617	7.1	48.8	8.1	13.0	3.1	6.0	12.8		0.6	64.0	34.8
1998	84.3	546	12.6	35.3	7.5	13.0	2.4	13.0	13.7			55.5	42.1
2002	82.9	535	7.1	41.1	6.9	17.8	8.2	9.0	8.4	0.9		55.1	43.4
2006	82.3	536	5.2	36.2	4.1	17.5	4.9	5.8	16.8	4.7		45.5	45.0
2010	84.6	520	5.8	34.2	8.1	13.5	4.4	5.8	21.5	6.3		48.1	45.2
2014	84.7	491	5.3	28.7	5.9	11.8	4.1	3.5	14.1	23.4		39.9	33.4
2018	85.0	484	7.2	24.4	3.7	12.0	3.1	5.8	13.8	26.9		47.3	49.6
