= Storå, Sweden =

Storå
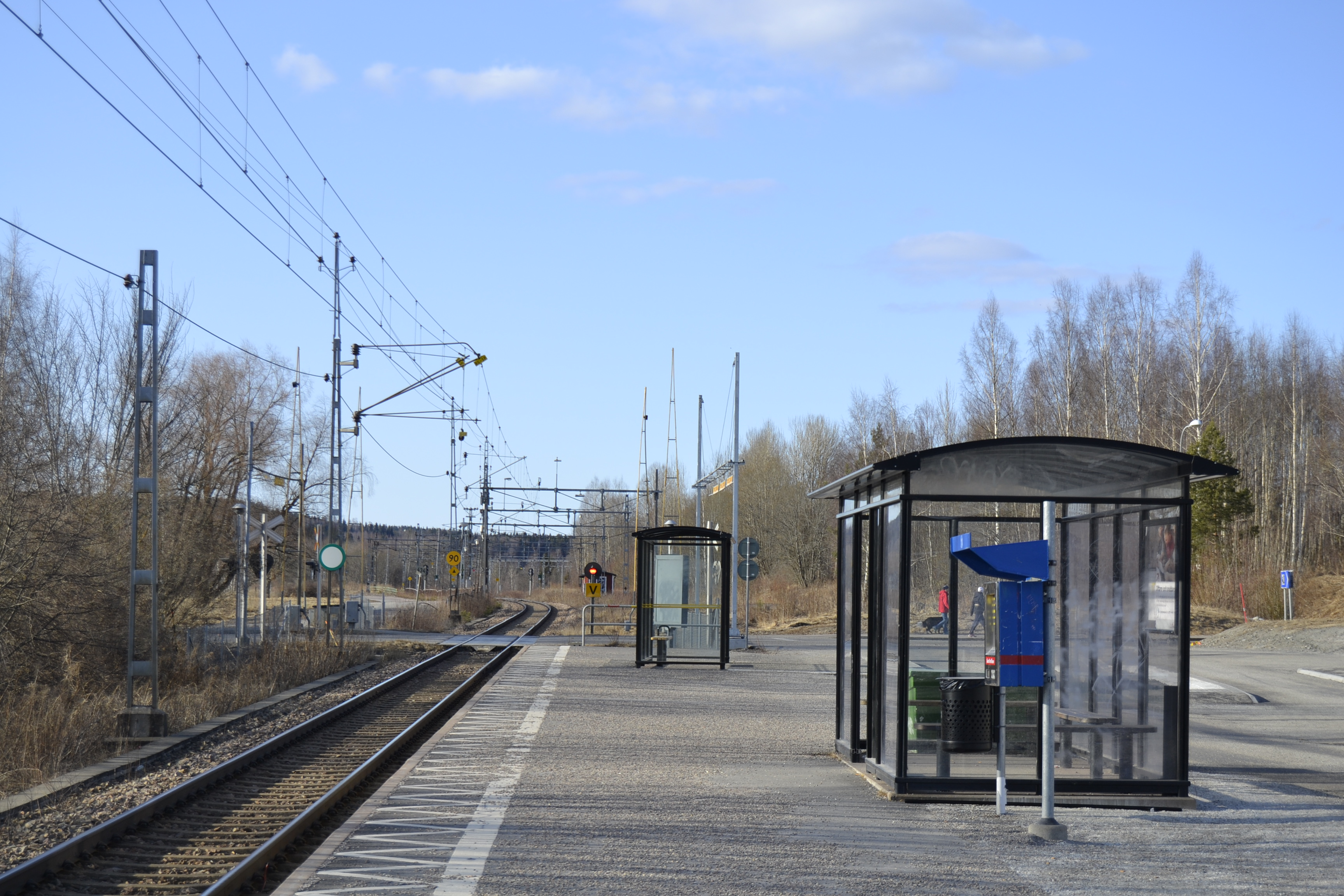
- Storå station

- Location within Örebro Location within Sweden
- Coordinates: 59°42′N 15°07′E
- Country: Sweden
- Province: Västmanland
- County: Örebro County
- Municipality: Lindesberg Municipality

Area
  - Total: 6.13 km^{2} (2.37 sq mi)

Population (15 November 2020)
  - Total: 1 929
  - Density: 315/km^{2} (820/sq mi)
- Time zone: UTC+1 (CET)
  - Summer (DST): UTC+2 (CEST)

Storå is a locality situated in Lindesberg Municipality, Örebro County, Sweden with 1,933 inhabitants in 2010.

Storå is mostly known for containing Stripa mine which was use since the 15th century until its closure in 1979. Other notable landmarks are Storåskolan and Grönbåda retirement home.

== Riksdag elections ==
Year	%	Votes	V	S	MP	C	L	KD	M	SD	NyD	Left	Right
1973	87.2	1,638	6.5	61.5		19.8	5.9	2.0	3.8			68.0	29.5
1976	89.4	1,726	4.8	61.9		21.4	5.6	1.0	4.9			66.7	31.9
1979	87.9	1,916	5.6	60.1		20.7	5.6	0.9	6.6			65.8	32.9
1982	89.8	1,920	5.5	63.8	1.4	16.0	3.1	1.9	8.4			69.2	27.5
1985	86.9	1,840	6.3	61.4	3.2	13.0	6.6		9.1			67.7	28.7
1988	81.5	1,693	7.5	58.6	5.4	12.2	7.9	2.0	6.4			71.5	26.5
1991	83.1	1,682	4.7	54.5	3.2	9.3	5.1	4.7	11.2		7.1	59.2	30.3
1994	84.2	1,674	8.4	60.4	6.2	9.1	2.5	2.5	10.7		1.1	73.8	24.8
1998	75.2	1,458	17.2	49.3	4.9	5.6	1.4	7.8	12.1			71.5	26.8
2002	76.1	1,687	9.7	54.0	4.3	10.0	6.1	4.9	8.2	1.1		67.9	29.3
2006	77.4	1,700	7.3	47.9	4.1	9.4	3.6	3.0	15.1	7.1		59.4	31.1
2010	81.8	2,265	5.3	41.3	4.6	8.5	3.6	3.9	19.9	12.1		51.2	35.9
2014	84.4	2,285	4.9	37.4	4.0	7.3	1.9	2.5	13.7	25.8		46.3	25.3
2018	82.9	2,233	7.5	30.0	1.8	8.6	2.1	5.2	10.9	32.3		47.9	50.5
