= Expedition Robinson 2004 =

- Season 8
- Presented by: Robert Aschberg
- No. of days: 67
- No. of castaways: 20
- Winner: Jerry Forsberg
- Runner-up: Fike Najafi
- Location: Tengah Island, Malaysia
- No. of episodes: 60

Release
- Original network: TV3
- Original release: September 11 – December 4, 2004

Season chronology
- ← Previous; 2003 Next → 2005

Expedition Robinson 2004 is the eighth season of Expedition Robinson to air in Sweden and it aired starting on 13 September 2004 airing four episodes a week (Monday through Thursday with a new episode each day and a re-airing of all recent episodes on Saturdays) and was broadcast until 4 December 2004.

== Overview ==
The major twist this season was that of "Team X", a team composed of five wildcard contestants who entered the game in episode 3 to compete against the original two teams. Joker Johnny Leinonen also entered the competition in episode cycle 3 as part of the South team after buying his spot in the contest. Along with this twist, from episode 3 on any contestant voted out of either of the original teams would be sent to Team X to compete in a duel with a member of Team X (chosen by the last person to win a duel).

Another twist that occurred in the same episode cycle was Frida Lundell's re-entrance into the competition following the voluntary exit of Tina Dadasvand. As an unexpected twist, Frida Lundell sold her spot in the game in episode cycle 4 in exchange for a sum of money. Following the sudden ejection of newer Team X members Gabriella Kopasz and Nicholas Nath due to rule breaking, the recently eliminated Rasmus Nilsson and Maryam "Shante" Shekhanzai returned to the game.

Following the initial merge of the North and South teams, the Robinson tribe competed against Team X in immunity challenges. If Team X won the challenge, then Robinson would be forced to vote out one of their members (or send them to duel someone in Team X), but if Robinson won they would vote to send one of their team members to Team X. When a second merge occurred in episode cycle nine, it was revealed to the contestants that recently eliminated contestants Jerry Forsberg, Johanna Hakala, Dan Karlsson, Johnny Leinonen, Mikael Lundell, and Rasmus Nilsson had been moved to a secret location called "Calm Island", where they had been competing for two spots in the final merge tribe. Of the six competing for the two spots, only Dan Karlsson and Mikael Lundell were successful in earning spots in the Robinson tribe.

At the end of the season, both the jury and the public were allowed to vote two of the eliminated contestants back into the game for the final four. The public chose Johanna, while the jury voted Jerry back into the game. In addition to this the public was allowed to allot ten jury votes among the two final contestants through the results of a public vote. Jerry Forsberg eventually won the season with a jury vote of 11–9 over Fike Najafi. Jerry received three of the public votes to Fike's seven.

== Finishing order ==
Contestant	Original Tribes	Episode Cycle 3	Episode Cycle 4	Episode Cycle 6	Episode Cycle 7	Episode Cycle 8	Merged Tribe	Finish
Oliver Kempe; 41, Stockholm	Goal							Ejected; Day 7
Frida Lundell; Returned to the game	North Team							2nd Voted Out; Day 13
Tina Dadasvand; 24, Malmö	South Team							Left Competition; Day 14
Gabriella Kopasz; Returned to Team X	North Team							3rd Voted Out; Day 19
Maryam "Shante" Shekhanzai; Returned to Team X	Lag X	Lag X						Lost Duel; Day 20
Frida Lundell; 28, Norrköping	North Team	South Team						Left Competition; Day 24
Nicolas Nath; Returned to Team X	South Team	South Team						4th Voted Out; Day 25
Rasmus Nilsson; Returned to Team X	Lag X	Lag X	Lag X					Lost Duel; Day 25
Gabriella Kopasz; 31, Gothenburg	North Team	Lag X	Lag X					Ejected; Day 29
Nicolas Nath; 20, Stockholm	South Team	South Team	Lag X					Ejected; Day 29
Jenny Åström; 20, Fagersta	North Team	North Team	North Team					5th Voted Out; Day 30; Lost Duel; Day 32
Isabel Adrian; Returned to Team X	North Team	North Team	North Team	Robinson				Voted to Team X Day 36
Mikael Lundell; Returned to Team X	North Team	North Team	North Team	Robinson				Voted to Team X Day 36
Isabel Adrian; 27, Gothenburg	North Team	North Team	North Team	Lag X				6th Voted Out; 1st Jury Member; Day 37
Jerry Forsberg; Returned to the game	North Team	North Team	North Team	Robinson	Robinson			Lost Duel; Day 39
Belina Jarra; 27, Gothenburg	South Team	South Team	South Team	Robinson	Robinson			7th Voted Out; 2nd Jury Member; Day 43
Dennis Fernholm; 32, Borås	South Team	South Team	South Team	Robinson	Robinson	Robinson		8th Voted Out; 3rd Jury Member; Day 49
Rasmus Nilsson; Returned to the game	Lag X	Lag X	Lag X	Lag X	Lag X	Lag X		Chosen to Leave; Day 50
Johnny Leinonen; Returned to the game	South Team	South Team	South Team	Robinson	Robinson	Robinson		Chosen to Leave; Day 51
Johanna Hakala; Returned to the game	South Team	South Team	South Team	Robinson	Robinson	Robinson		Lost Duel; Day 51
Dan Karlsson; Returned to the game	South Team	South Team	South Team	Robinson	Robinson	Robinson		Voted to Comfort Island; Day 52
Camilla "Milla" Nyström; 22, Gothenburg	Lag X	Lag X	Lag X	Lag X	Lag X	Lag X	Robinson	9th Voted Out; 4th Jury Member; Day 54
Rasmus Nilsson; 30. Bromma	Lag X	Lag X	Lag X	Lag X	Lag X	Lag X	Comfort Island	Eliminate on CI; 5th Jury Member; Day 56
Jerry Forsberg; Returned to game	North Team	North Team	North Team	Robinson	Robinson	Comfort Island	Comfort Island	Eliminated on CI; Day 57
Johanna Hakala; Returned to the game	South Team	South Team	South Team	Robinson	Robinson	Robinson	Comfort Island	Eliminated on CI; Day 58
Johnny Leinonen; 38, Motala; Season 3, 13th Place	South Team	South Team	South Team	Robinson	Robinson	Robinson	Comfort Island	Eliminated on CI; 6th Jury Member; Day 60
Göran Larsson; 39, Höllviken	Lag X	Lag X	Lag X	Lag X	Lag X	Lag X	Robinson	10th Voted Out; 7th Jury Member; Day 61
Maryam "Shante" Shekhanzai; 21, Alingsås	Lag X	Lag X		Lag X	Lag X	Lag X	Robinson	Lost Challenge; Day 63
Mikael Lundell; 26, Stockholm	North Team	North Team	North Team	Lag X	Lag X	Comfort Island	Robinson	Lost Challenge; 8th Jury Member; Day 65
Caroline "Carro" Johansson; 24, Gothenburg	Lag X	Lag X	Lag X	Lag X	Lag X	Lag X	Robinson	Lost Challenge; 9th Jury Member; Day 66
Johanna Hakala; 32, Kristianstad	South Team	South Team	South Team	Robinson	Robinson	Robinson	Robinson	Lost Challenge; 10th Jury Member; Live Final
Dan Karlsson; 43, Östra Deje	South Team	South Team	South Team	Robinson	Robinson	Robinson	Robinson	Lost Challenge; Live Final
Fike Najafi; 23, Gothenburg	North Team	North Team	North Team	Robinson	Robinson	Robinson	Robinson	Runner-Up; Live Final
Jerry Forsberg; 23, Malmö	North Team	North Team	North Team	Robinson	Robinson		Robinson	Sole Survivor; Live Final

== The game ==
Challenge winners and eliminations by cycle
Week #	Episodes	Challenges		Eliminated	Vote	Finish
Week #	No.	Reward	Immunity	Eliminated	Vote	Finish
1	1			Oliver		Refused Challenge; Day 1
1	1			Tina		Quit Challenge; Day 1
1	1			Johanna		Lost Challenge; Day 2
1	2			Dan		Lost Challenge; Day 3
1	3			Nicolas		Lost Challenge; Day 4
1	4			Belina		Eliminated; Day 5
1	5			Dennis	7-1	1st Voted Out; Day 6
2	6	South Team	South Team	Oliver	No vote	Ejected; Day 7
2	10	South Team	Jerry	Frida	5-2	2nd Voted Out; Day 13
3	11	Both Teams	South Team	Tina	No vote	Left Competition; Day 14
3	15	Both Teams	Mikael	Gabriella	4-3	3rd Voted Out; Day 19
4	16	South Team	North Team	Shante	No vote	Lost Duel; Day 20
4	20	South Team	North Team	Frida	No vote	Left Competition; Day 24
4	20	South Team	Dan	Nicholas	4-2-1	4th Voted Out; Day 25
5	21	None	South Team	Rasmus	No vote	Lost Duel; Day 25
5	24	None	South Team	Nicholas	No vote	Ejected; Day 29
5	24	None	South Team	Gabriella	No vote	Ejected; Day 29
5	25	None	Jerry	Jenny	4-1-1	5th Voted Out; Day 30
6	26	None	Robinson	Jenny	No vote	Lost Duel; Day 32
6	30	None	Robinson	Isabel	6-5-3-3-1	Voted to Lag X Day 36
6	30	None	Robinson	Mikael	6-5-3-3-1	Voted to Lag X Day 36
6	30	None	Rasmus	Isabel	3-2-1-1	6th Voted Out; Day 37
7	32	None	Lag X	Jerry	No Vote	Lost Duel; Day 39
7	35	None	Fike	Belina	3-2-1	7th Voted Out; Day 43
8	37	Lag X	Lag X	Mikael	No Vote	Lost Duel; Day 45
8	40	Lag X	Johnny	Dennis	3-2	8th Voted Out; Day 49
9	41	None	Göran	Rasmus	No Vote	Sent to Comfort Island; Day 50
9	42	None	Göran	Johnny	No vote	Sent to Comfort Island; Day 51
9	42	None	Göran	Johanna	No vote	Lost Duel; Day 51
9	43	None	Göran	Dan	3-1-1-1	Voted to Comfort Island; Day 52
9	45	None	Göran	Milla	4-1-1	9th Voted Out; Day 54
10	47	None	Johnny	Rasmus	1-0	Eliminated at Comfort Island; Day 56
10	47	None	Dan	Jerry	1-0	Eliminated at Comfort Island; Day 57
10	48	None	Mikeal	Johanna	1-0	Eliminated at Comfort Island; Day 58
10	50	None	Dan; Mikael	Johnny	No Vote	Eliminated at Comfort Island; Day 60
10	50	None	Dan; Mikael	Göran	4-1-1	10th Voted Out; Day 61
11	52	None		Shante	No Vote	Lost Challenge; Day 63
11	54	None	Fike	Mikael	No Vote	Lost Challenge; Day 65
11	55	None	Dan	Carro	No Vote	Lost Challenge; Day 66
11	55	None		Jerry	4-3-1-1-1-1-1	Voted Back into Competition; Day 67
12	56-59			Johanna	Public Vote	Voted Back into Competition; Final Week
12	Final		Jerry	Johanna	No Vote	Lost Challenge; Live Final
12	Final		Jerry	Dan	No Vote	Lost Challenge; Live Final
12	Final	Jury Vote		Fike	11-9	Runner-Up
12	Final	Jury Vote		Jerry	11-9	Sole Survivor

== Voting history ==
	No Tribes								Original Tribes			Team X Enters								Robinson vs. Team X											Merged Tribe and Comfort Island						Merged Tribe									
Episode Cycle #:	1							2		3		4			5				6				7		8		9					10					11				12					
Episode #:	1			2	3	4	5	6	10	11	15	16	20		21	24		25	26	30			32	35	37	40	41	42		43	45	47		48	50		52	54	55		56-59			Live Final		
Eliminated:	Oliver; No vote^{1}	Tina; No vote^{1}	Johanna; No vote^{1}	Dan; No vote^{1}	Nicolas; No vote^{1}	Belina; No vote^{1}	Dennis; 7/8 votes^{1}	Oliver; No vote	Frida; 5/7 votes^{2}	Tina; No vote	Gabriella; 4/7 votes^{3}	Shante; No vote	Frida; No vote^{4}	Nicolas; 4/7 votes^{5}	Rasmus; No vote	Nicholas; No vote	Gabriella; No vote	Jenny; 4/6 votes^{6}	Jenny; No vote	Isabel; 6/18 votes^{7}	Mikael; 5/18 votes^{7}	Isabel; 3/7 votes^{8}	Jerry; No vote^{11}	Belina; 3/6 votes^{9}	Mikael; No vote^{11}	Dennis; 3/5 votes^{10}	Rasmus; No vote^{11}	Johnny; No vote^{11}	Johanna; No vote^{11}	Dan; 3/6 votes^{11}	Milla; 4/6 votes	Rasmus; 1/1 vote^{11}	Jerry; 1/1 vote^{11}	Johanna; 1/1 vote^{11}	Johnny; No vote^{11}	Göran; 4/6 votes	Shante; No vote	Mikael; No vote	Carro; No vote	Jerry; 4/12 votes^{12}	Johanna; Public Vote^{12}			Johanna; Dan; No vote	Fike; 9/20 votes^{13}	Jerry; 11/20 votes^{13}
Voter	Vote																																													
Jerry		Won	Stayed	2nd			Dennis		Frida		Gabriella							Jenny		Johnny, Belina			Lost	On CI								3rd	3rd	Returns						Mikael	Finalist			1st	Jury Vote	
Fike		Won	Stayed	3rd			Dennis		Frida		Gabriella							Jenny		Isbael, Mikael				Dennis		Dennis				Milla	Milla					Göran	3rd	1st	Finalist					2nd	Jury Vote	
Dan		Won	Stayed	6th	Goal									Nicholas						Isbael, Jerry				Belina		Dennis				Göran	On CI	6th	Jerry	2nd	1st	Göran	4th	3rd	Won	Finalist				3rd		
Johanna		Won	Left	Goal										Nicholas						Isbael, Mikael				Johnny		Dan				On CI		5th	2nd	3rd						Dennis	Returns		1st	4th		Jerry
Carro	Hidden																		Won			Mikael								Dan	Milla					Göran	2nd	2nd	Lost	Shante		2nd			Fike	
Mikael		Won	Stayed	4th		Safe	Dennis		Frida		Gabriella							Jenny		Johnny, Belina		Milla	Won		Lost	On CI						4th	5th	Johanna	2nd	Fike	1st	4th		Jerry		-				Jerry
Shante	Hidden											Lost	Returns									Isabel								Dan	Milla					Göran	5th			Carro			-			
Göran	Hidden																					Isabel								Carro	Carro					Carro				Rasmus	-				Fike	
Johnny	Not in game													Nicholas						Isabel, Mikael				Belina		Dennis			On CI			Rasmus	4th	4th	3rd					Johanna			-			Jerry
Rasmus	Hidden														Lost	Returns						Isabel						On CI				2nd								Jerry		-				Jerry
Milla	Hidden																					Mikael								Dan	Fike									Jerry	-					Jerry
Dennis		Won	Stayed	5th		Belina	Fike	Goal						Nicholas						Isbael, Mikael				Belina	Won	Dan														Johanna	3rd					Jerry
Belina		Won	Stayed	Immune		Out	Goal							Dennis						Mikael, Isabel				Dennis																Johanna		-				Jerry
Isabel		Won	Stayed	Immune		Safe	Dennis		Fike		Fike							Jenny		Johnny, Belina		Göran																		Jerry	-					Jerry
Jenny		Won	Stayed	Immune		Belina	Dennis		Frida		Fike							Mikael	Lost																											
Gabriella		Won	Stayed	Immune	Won	Safe	Dennis		Frida		Fike	Won																																		
Nicholas		Won	Stayed	1st	Lost	Goal								Belina	Won																															
Frida		Won	Stayed	Immune		Safe	Dennis		Fike	Returns																																				
Tina		Quit	Goal																																											
Oliver	Refused	Goal																																												
Black Vote											Gabriella			Belina				Fike													Milla															

^1 During the first week of the competition the contestants competed as individuals in a series of challenges. The contestants were led to believe these challenges would ultimately result in the elimination of one or more contestants from the game. In reality, the contestants that lost these challenges were sent to "Goal" where members of the South Team would ultimately live.
^2 As he won the North Team's individual immunity challenge, Jerry had immunity at the second tribal council.
^3 As he won the North Team's individual immunity challenge, Mikael had immunity at the third tribal council. As punishment for coming in second at the challenge Gabriella had a black vote cast against her at tribal council.
^4 Frida sold her in spot in the game in an auction to Johnny.
^5 As he won the South Team's individual immunity challenge, Dan had immunity at the fourth tribal council. As punishment for coming in second at the challenge Belina had a black vote cast against her at tribal council.
^6 As he won the North Team's individual immunity challenge, Jerry had immunity at the fifth tribal council. As punishment for coming in second at the challenge Fike had a black vote cast against him at tribal council.
^7 When the North and South teams merged to compete with Lag X they formed the Robinson Tribe. Upon the merger, the tribe was told that they would have to vote to send two of their members to Lag X.
^8 As he won Lag X's individual immunity challenge, Rasmus had immunity at the sixth tribal council.
^9 As he won the Robinson Tribe's individual immunity challenge, Fike had immunity at the seventh tribal council.
^10 As he won the Robinson Tribe's individual immunity challenge, Fike had immunity at the seventh tribal council.
^11 Prior to the merge of the Robinson Tribe and Lag X a series of duels took place. The winners of these duels remained in the game while the losers were sent to Comfort Island. In addition to the duels there were several choices given to the tribes to decide whom to eliminate from their tribe. The eliminated contestants were also sent to Comfort Island. Just prior to the merge it was revealed to the contestants that the duel losers had been sent to Comfort Island and they were told they would have to vote one person from either tribe to be the last person sent to Comfort Island. Once all members were on Comfort Island where they competed in a series of challenges. The winner of these challenges would then vote out one of the losers. In the last challenge the contestant that came in last was automatically eliminated. While the first and second-place finishers returned to Robinson Tribe.
^12 At what the contestants thought was the final tribal council it was revealed that a secret pact had been made by Carro, Dan, Fike, Mikael and Shante to split the million Krona prize if one of them ultimately won. As this was against the rules, it was announced that two of jury members would re-enter the game for a chance to become one of the finalist. The first re-entry was decided by a jury vote in which the jurors were each given the chance to vote for any juror other than themselves that they'd like to see return to the game. The second contestant to re-enter was decided via a series of public votes that eventually came down to the three most popular jurors.
^13 During the live final the four finalists competed in plank where the first two to fall were eliminated. The last two contestants on the plank each earned the right to eliminate one juror from voting eligibility. Fike chose Shante while Jerry chose Dan. Further, the public vote was allowed to allocate ten votes between the two finalist based on voting percentages. Fike received 7 of these votes while Jerry received 3.
