= Expedition Robinson 2001 =

- Season 5
- Presented by: Anders Lundin
- No. of days: 47
- No. of castaways: 17
- Winner: Jan Emanuel Johansson
- Runner-up: Jan Dinkelspiel
- Location: Pulau Besar, Malaysia
- No. of episodes: 13

Release
- Original network: SVT1
- Original release: October 6, 2001 – January 5, 2002

Additional information
- Filming dates: June 2001 – August 2001

Season chronology
- ← Previous; 2000 Next → 2002

Expedition Robinson 2001 is the fifth edition of Expedition Robinson to air in Sweden, airing in 2001.

== Season summary ==
Prior to filming, the public was asked to choose two contestants, from a pool of six, that would join the game as jokers and coaches for their respective teams. Following the vote, both Bo Jonsson and Sara Aldrin entered the game. The major twist for this season was the tribal swap that took place after the duel in episode three.

This season also saw the first "pre-first" vote exit which was taken by Maria Kjellström. The second twist of the season was introduced when it was time for the jury to vote: each finalist was allowed to pick three of the last nine contestants eliminated to vote for a winner. The other three votes would come from the public. Ultimately, it was Jan Emanuel Johansson who won the season with a jury vote of 7–2 over Jan Dinkelspiel. All three public votes went to Jan Emanuel Johansson.

== Finishing order ==
Contestant	Original Tribes	Episode 3 Tribes	Merged Tribe	Finish
Maria "Marion" Kjellström; 28, Järpen				Left Competition; Day ?
Sylvia Söderström; 49, Mörarp	North Team			1st Voted Out; Day ?
Bo Jonsson; 42, Huddinge	North Team			2nd Voted Out; Day ?
Ella Omma; 18, Arvidsjaur	South Team	South Team		3rd Voted Out; Day ?
Sofie Tocklin; 25, Stockholm	North Team	South Team		4th Voted Out; Day ?
Sara Aldrin; 29, Eskilstuna	South Team	South Team		5th Voted Out; Day ?
Andreas Mattsson; 31, Bromma	North Team	North Team	Robinson	6th Voted Out; 1st Jury Member; Day ?
Niklas Berg; 23, Umeå	South Team	South Team	Robinson	7th Voted Out; 2nd Jury Member; Day ?
Kenny Andersén; 40, Fjällbacka	South Team	South Team	Robinson	Left Competition; 3rd Jury Member; Day ?
Ann Gärdsby; 46, Malmö	South Team	South Team	Robinson	8th Voted Out; Day ?
Petra Pantzar; 31, Vara	South Team	South Team	Robinson	9th Voted Out; Day ?
Emma Andersson; 22, Ängelholm	North Team	North Team	Robinson	10th Voted Out; 4th Jury Member; Day ?
Björn Hernefeldt; 46, Ängesträsk	South Team	South Team	Robinson	11th Voted Out; Day ?
Zübeyde Simsek; 31, Katrineholm	North Team	North Team	Robinson	Lost Challenge; 5th Jury Member; Day ?
Tommy Jensen; 41, Landskrona	North Team	North Team	Robinson	Lost Challenge; 6th Jury Member; Day ?
Jan Dinkelspiel; 24, Stockholm	South Team	South Team	Robinson	Runner-Up; Day 47
Jan Emanuel Johansson; 27, Norrtälje	North Team	North Team	Robinson	Sole Survivor; Day 47

== Lost Public Vote ==
Candidate
Helena Edlund
31, Sundsvall
Paul Castillo Rodas
26, Gothenburg
Per Sundberg
46, Lidingö
Sharon Lavie
26, Västerås

== Voting history ==
	Original Tribes			Post Episode 3 Duel			Merged Tribe										
Episode #:	1	2	3	4	5	6	7	8	9		10	11	12	13		Reunion	
Eliminated:	Maria; No vote	Sylvia; 4/8 votes^{1}	Bo; 3/7 votes^{2}	Ella; 6/9 votes^{3}	Sofie; 3/8 votes^{4}	Sara; 5/7 votes^{5}	Andreas; 8/11 votes	Niklas; 9/11 votes^{6}	Kenny; No vote	Ann; 3/9 votes^{6}	Petra; 4/8 votes^{6}	Emma; 3/7 votes^{6}	Björn; 3/6 votes^{6}	Zübeyde; No vote	Tommy; No vote	Jan; 2/9 votes^{7}	Jan Emanuel; 7/9 votes^{8}
Voter	Vote																
Jan Emanuel		Sylvia	Bo				Andreas	Niklas		Ann	Petra	Björn	Björn	Won		Jury Vote	
Jan				Ella	Petra	Sara	Niklas	Niklas		Ann	Petra	Emma	Björn	2nd	Won	Jury Vote	
Tommy		Andreas	Sofie				Andreas	Niklas		Emma	Petra	Emma	Björn	3rd	Lost		Jan Emanuel
Zübeyde		Sylvia	Bo				Andreas	Niklas		Petra	Petra	Björn	Jan Emanuel	Lost		Jan	
Björn				Ella	Niklas	Petra	Niklas	Niklas		Tommy	Emma	Emma	Jan Emanuel				
Emma		Sylvia	Bo				Andreas	Niklas		Ann	Björn	Tommy	~~Tommy~~				Jan Emanuel
Petra				Ella	Sofie	Sara	Andreas	Niklas		Björn	Zübeyde	Tommy					
Ann				Ella	Sofie	Sara	Andreas	Niklas		Zübeyde	Zübeyde						
Kenny				Ella	Sofie	Sara	Andreas	Niklas									Jan Emanuel
Niklas				Björn	Björn	Sara	Andreas	Tommy		Björn							Jan Emanuel
Andreas		Sylvia	Sofie				Tommy	Tommy								Jan	
Sara	Not in game			Ella	Niklas	Petra											
Sofie		Andreas	Andreas	Niklas	Sara												
Ella				Sofie													
Bo	Not in game	Zübeyde	Zübeyde														
Sylvia		Andreas															
Maria																	

^1 Bo was immune at the North team's first tribal council as team coach.
^2 Tommy was immune at the second tribal council.
^3 Sara was immune at the South team's first tribal council as team coach.
^4 Jan was immune at the fourth tribal council.
^5 Björn was immune at the fifth tribal council.
^6 As a twist this season, the first five people voted out of the Robinson tribe would have a vote at the tribal council after their elimination.
^7 Both members of the final two were allowed to choose three people from the last nine eliminated as jury members.
^8 The public was allowed to award three votes to the finalists.

== Book ==
- Svensson, Niklas (2004). Robinsonboken - Sanningen om Expedition Robinson (in Swedish). Bazar Förlag AB. ISBN 91-7028-017-7.
