= Ställdalen =

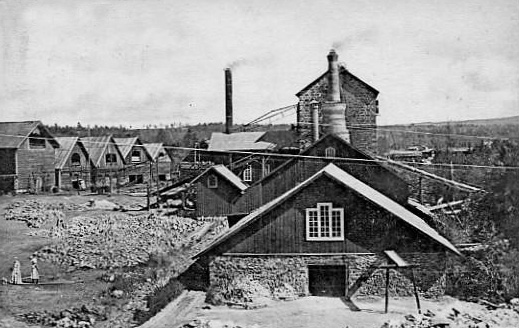
- Ställdalen

- Location within Örebro Location within Sweden
- Coordinates: 59°56′N 14°56′E
- Country: Sweden
- Province: Västmanland
- County: Örebro County
- Municipality: Ljusnarsberg Municipality

Area
  - Total: 2.10 km^{2} (0.81 sq mi)

Population (31 December 2010)
  - Total: 539
  - Density: 256/km^{2} (660/sq mi)
- Time zone: UTC+1 (CET)
  - Summer (DST): UTC+2 (CEST)

Ställdalen is a locality situated in Ljusnarsberg Municipality, Örebro County, Sweden with 539 inhabitants in 2010. In January 1956 there was a rail accident there.
