= Independent Municipal Party of Ljusnarsberg =

Swedish local political party

Independent Municipal Party of Ljusnarsberg (in Swedish: Ljusnarsbergs Obundna Kommunparti, LOK) was a local political party in Ljusnarsberg Municipality, Sweden.

The party held seats in the Ljusnarsberg municipal council 1982–2006, and was further represented 2006–2014 as part of the alliance Kraftsamling för Ljusnarsberg.

== History ==
LOK was formed ahead of the 1982 elections by former county councillor Cecil Strömberg who had defected from the Centre Party. It gained nine of the 35 seats in the municipal council at the 1982 elections. Its most successful election was 1991 when the party 30,8 percent of the vote, giving them eleven seats. In 1992, the party became part of the ruling majority in the municipality.

In the 1998 municipal elections, the party got six seats in the municipal council. In 2002 they lost three of the seats. In total, the party got 321 votes (10.2%). The councilors elected in 2002 were Maria Sahlin, Ulf Anagrius and Wicken Von Post.

In the 2006 elections Kraftsamling för Ljusnarsberg (KFL) was formed as an electoral alliance between the People's Party and LOK. The alliance won five seats in the 2006 election and two in the 2010 election. In the 2014 election the People's Party chose to run their own list, with LOK not running a list of their own. KFL was officially dissolved in March 2015 and LOK was made dormant.
