= Expedition Robinson 2000 =

- Season 4
- Presented by: Anders Lundin
- No. of days: 47
- No. of castaways: 16
- Winner: Mattias Dalerstedt
- Runner-up: Edward Lundberg
- Location: Mensirip, Malaysia
- No. of episodes: 13

Release
- Original network: SVT1
- Original release: 7 October – 30 December 2000

Additional information
- Filming dates: June 2000 – August 2000

Season chronology
- ← Previous; 1999 Next → 2001

Expedition Robinson 2000 is the fourth edition of Expedition Robinson to air in Sweden and it aired in 2000. For the first time since season one when a tribe lost an immunity challenge it was up to that tribe to vote out one of their members.

== Season summary ==
The first twist of the season came about when the men and women competed in separate competitions to determine who would select tribes. Roxana and Edward won the challenges and the right to select their tribes. Another major twist this season occurred when two contestants known as 'wildcards' entered the game following the merge. The two wildcard contestants were Anne Hausmanis and Håkan Marklund. Because of Adnan's ejection from the game, Buba was allowed back into the game. Thanks to a little help from the wildcard contestants, the South Team's alliance was able to make it all the way to final four. Mattias Dalerstedt eventually won the season with a jury vote of 7–2 over Edward Lundberg. As there were only eight jury members, the ninth vote was cast by the public. The public voted for Edward.

== Finishing order ==
Contestant	Original Tribes	Merged Tribe	Finish
Birgitta Andréasson; 47, Trelleborg	North Team		1st Voted Out; Day 3
Ulrika Teijler; 19, Vingåker	North Team		2nd Voted Out; Day 6
Karin Flinck; 24, Stockholm	North Team		3rd Voted Out; Day 9
Charlotta Flyckt; 39, Sigtuna	South Team		4th Voted Out; Day 12
Buba Badjie; Returned to the game	South Team		5th Voted Out; Day 15
Adnan Amedi; 23, Katrineholm	South Team		Ejected; Day 16
Arthur Csatho; 38, Stockholm	North Team		6th Voted Out; Day 18
Johan Hellström; 36, Umeå	North Team	Robinson	7th Voted Out; 1st Jury Member; Day 22
Buba Badije; 32, Gävle	South Team	Robinson	8th Voted Out; 2nd Jury Member; Day 26
Roxana Sundström; 28, Örebro	North Team	Robinson	9th Voted Out; 3rd Jury Member; Day 30
Freddy Lund; 42, Åsa	North Team	Robinson	10th Voted Out; 4th Jury Member; Day 34
Anne Hausmanis; 33, Eskilstuna	Uda Dan Dara	Robinson	11th Voted Out; 5th Jury Member; Day 38
Håkan Marklund; 33, Skellefteå	Uda Dan Dara	Robinson	12th Voted Out; 6th Jury Member; Day 42
Linda Häggkvist; 22, Sundsvall	South Team	Robinson	Lost Challenge; 7th Jury Member; Day 46
Hildegard Krebbs; 61, Kungälv	South Team	Robinson	Lost Challenge; 8th Jury Member; Day 46
Edward Lundberg; 34, Stockholm	South Team	Robinson	Runner-Up; Day 47
Mattias Dalerstedt; 24, Gothenburg	South Team	Robinson	Sole Survivor; Day 47

== The game ==
Air date	Challenges		Eliminated	Vote	Finish
Air date	Reward	Immunity	Eliminated	Vote	Finish
7 October 2000	None	South Team	Brigitta	6-1	1st Voted Out; Day 3
14 October 2000	South Team	South Team	Ulrika	5-1	2nd Voted Out; Day 6
21 October 2000	North Team	South Team	Karin	4-1	3rd Voted Out; Day 9
28 October 2000	North Team	North Team	Charlotta	6-1	4th Voted Out; Day 12
4 November 2000	North Team	North Team	Buba	4-2	5th Voted Out; Day 15
11 November 2000	North Team	South Team	Adnan	No vote	Ejected; Day 16
11 November 2000	North Team	South Team	Arthur	3-1	6th Voted Out; Day 18
18 November 2000	None	Linda	Johan	6-4	7th Voted Out; 1st Jury Member; Day 22
25 November 2000	Buba	Edward	Buba	8-1	8th Voted Out; 2nd Jury Member; Day 26
2 December 2000	Edward	Anne	Roxanna	6-2-1-1	9th Voted Out; 3rd Jury Member; Day 30
9 December 2000	Freddy; Håkan	Hildegard	Freddy	6-1	10th Voted Out; 4th Jury Member; Day 34
16 December 2000	Mattias	Linda	Anne	4-1-1-1	11th Voted Out; 5th Jury Member; Day 38
23 December 2000	Håkan	Mattias	Håkan	4-2	12th Voted Out; 6th Jury Member; Day 42
30 December 2000	None	Mattias	Linda	No vote	Lost Challenge; 7th Jury Member; Day 46
30 December 2000	None	Edward	Hildegard	No vote	Lost Challenge; 8th Jury Member; Day 46
30 December 2000	Jury Vote		Edward	7-2	Runner-Up
30 December 2000	Jury Vote		Mattias	7-2	Sole Survivor

== Voting history ==
	Original Tribes							Merged Tribe									
Episode #:	1	2	3	4	5	6		7	8	9	10	11	12	13		Reunion	
Eliminated:	Brigitta; 6/7 votes	Ulrika; 5/6 votes	Karin; 4/5 votes	Charlotta; 6/7 votes	Buba; 4/6 votes	Adnan; No vote^{1}	Arthur; 3/4 votes	Johan; 6/10 votes	Buba; 8/10 votes^{2}	Roxana; 5/10 votes^{2}, ^{3}	Freddy; 6/8 votes^{2}	Anne; 4/7 votes^{2}	Håkan; 4/6 votes^{2}	Linda; Hildegard; No vote		Edward; 2/9 votes^{4}	Mattias; 7/9 votes^{4}
Voter	Vote																
Mattias				Charlotta	Buba			Johan	Buba	Roxana	Freddy	Håkan	Håkan	2nd	Won	Jury Vote	
Edward				Charlotta	Buba			Johan	Buba	Roxana	Freddy	Anne	Håkan	Won		Jury Vote	
Hildegard				Charlotta	Buba			Johan	Buba	Roxana	Freddy	Anne	Håkan	3rd	Lost	Edward	
Linda				Charlotta	Buba			Johan	Buba	Roxana	Freddy	Anne	Håkan	4th	Lost		Mattias
Håkan	Uda Dan Dara							Johan	Buba	Hildegard	Freddy	Mattias	Hildegard				Mattias
Anne	Uda Dan Dara							Johan	Buba	Roxana; Freddy	Freddy	Hildegard	Hildegard				Mattias
Freddy	Brigitta	Ulrika	Karin				Arthur	Edward	Buba	Hildegard	Anne	Anne					Mattias
Roxana	Brigitta	Ulrika	Karin				Arthur	Edward	Buba	Hildegard	~~Hildegard~~						Mattias
Buba				Charlotta	Hildegard	Returns		Edward	Mattias	Edward							Mattias
Johan	Brigitta	Ulrika	Karin				Arthur	Edward	~~Edward~~								Mattias
Arthur	Brigitta	Ulrika	Karin				Freddy										
Adnan				Charlotta	Hildegard												
Charlotta				Adnan													
Karin	Brigitta	Ulrika	Arthur														
Ulrika	Brigitta	Freddy															
Brigitta	Karin																

^1 As Adnan was ejected from the game Arthur and Buba took part in a duel just prior to the merge in order to see who would return to the game and take his place.
^2 As a twist this season, the first five people voted out of the Robinson tribe would have a vote at the tribal council after their elimination.
^3 As reward for winning the immunity challenge, Anne was allowed to vote twice at the ninth tribal council.
^4 The public was allowed to award a jury vote to one of the finalists.
