= Vedevåg =

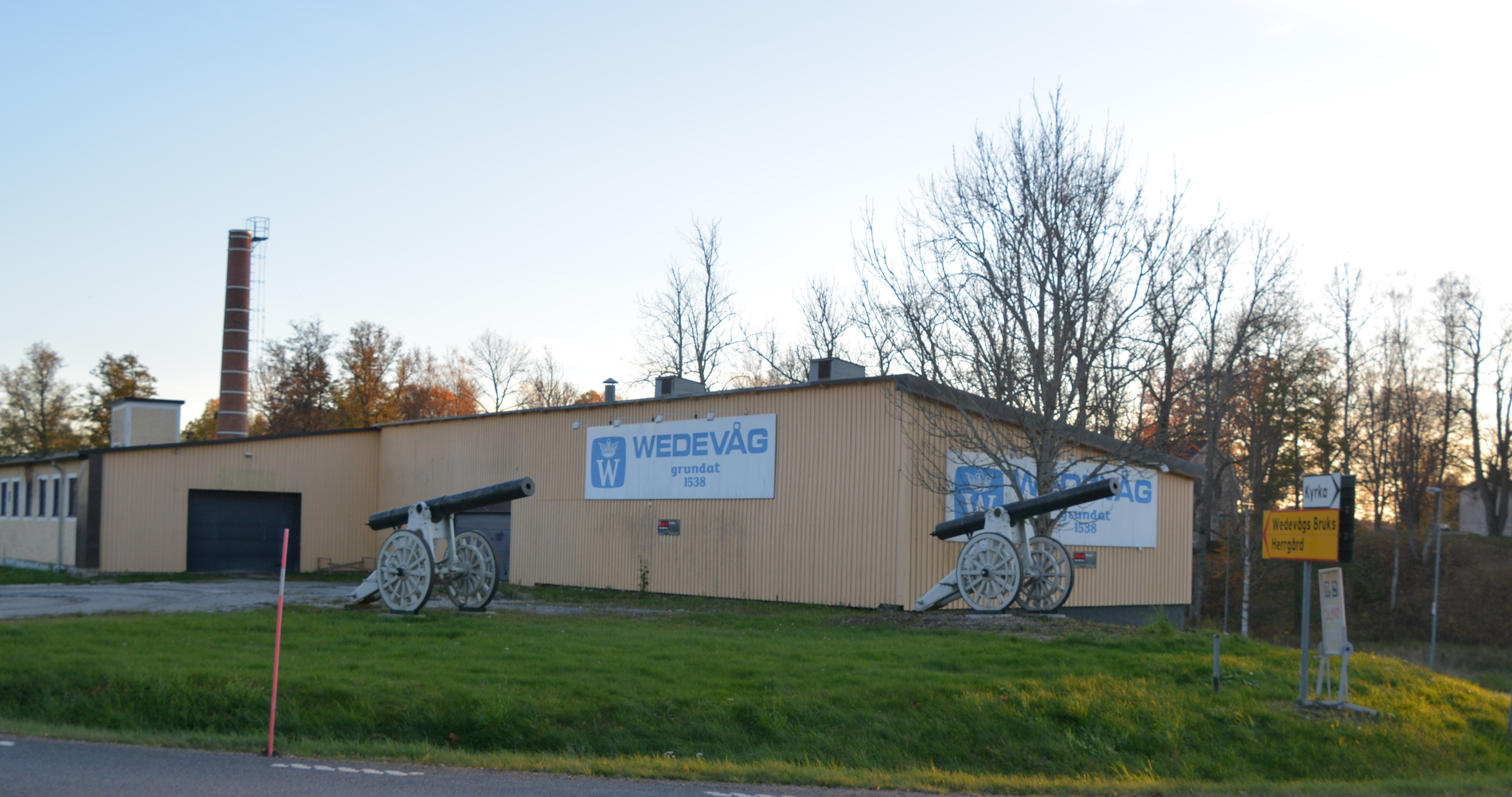
- Wedevåg Tools

- Location within Örebro Location within Sweden
- Coordinates: 59°31′30″N 15°17′20″E
- Country: Sweden
- Province: Västmanland
- County: Örebro County
- Municipality: Lindesberg Municipality

Area
  - Total: 1.46 km^{2} (0.56 sq mi)

Population (31 December 2010)
  - Total: 656
  - Density: 448/km^{2} (1,160/sq mi)
- Time zone: UTC+1 (CET)
  - Summer (DST): UTC+2 (CEST)

Vedevåg is a locality in Lindesberg Municipality, Örebro County, Sweden with 714 inhabitants in 2015.
