= Emma Andersson =

Swedish television personality and singer

Emma Zetterberg
- Born: Emma Cornelia Andersson; 24 April 1979 (age 46); Ängelholm Municipality, Sweden
- Occupations: Television presenter, reality show contestant, model, singer
- Spouse: Henrik Zetterberg

Emma Cornelia Zetterberg (née Andersson; born 24 April 1979) is a Swedish television personality and singer. She is married to former Detroit Red Wings captain Henrik Zetterberg.

== Career ==
Andersson first claimed to fame in Expedition Robinson 2001 as one of the contestants. One year after her television adventure, she launched a singing career releasing the music album Who I Am. Among her most known songs are "Weightless", a duet with Bosson.

In 2003 she entered a special Best of the best Expedition Robinson, with half of the participants consisting of the most popular former contestants and half of debutants, which she won.

Andersson got an offer to host Dolce Vita on Kanal 5, which she took. The show ran for a couple of seasons. Andersson has since done a number of different shows on Kanal 5 before moving to the United States with her fiancé.

== Controversy ==
In 2002, Andersson participated as an interviewee in the Swedish TV4 show Ursäkta röran, vi bygger om (English: Pardon the mess, we're renovating). The show made headlines due to a segment called "the Swedish Nazi-reference championship", The singer and former Expedition Robinson-star was fooled into an interview during which the program leaders made over fifty Nazi-references and observed her reactions. These included jokes such as naming the show they claimed to work for "Treblinka", claiming that Leni Riefenstahl was a modern director of music videos, that Joseph Goebbels was a DJ whose music resembled Andersson's, and dozens of other references to the Third Reich and the Holocaust. Throughout the interview, Andersson wore a T-shirt with the text "Treblinka – Class of '45". Andersson didn't seem to react at all on tape. She later claimed that her reactions were edited out to make fun of her.

== Personal life ==
She married professional ice hockey player Henrik Zetterberg in Mölle, Sweden on 23 July 2010. They live in Bloomfield Hills, Michigan (a suburb of Detroit) and have a summer house on Alnön in Sweden.

== Discography ==
=== Singles ===
Title	Year	Peak chart positions	Album
Title	Year	SWE	Album
"Celebrate me"	2003	9	Non-album singles
