= Kopparbergs Brewery =

Swedish cider company

- Logo of Kopparbergs Brewery
- Native name: Kopparbergs Bryggeri
- Founded: 1882 in Kopparberg, Sweden
- Headquarters: Bergslagen, Sweden
- Website: kopparbergs.se

Kopparbergs Brewery (Swedish: Kopparbergs Bryggeri; literally "Copper Mountain's Brewery") is a Swedish brewery and cider company based in Bergslagen.

== Kopparberg Cider ==
Kopparberg Cider is made by Kopparberg Breweries in the locality of Kopparberg in Örebro County, central Sweden. Established in 1882, the brewery is family owned and is the main employer for the tiny town of just 4,000 people. Kopparberg Breweries AB is Sweden's second largest cider brewing company.

== Kopparberg UK ==
Kopparberg was introduced to the United Kingdom in 2003 by B O Times1 Limited.

Originally launched in apple and pear cider variations, the non-alcoholic pear and mixed fruit ciders were introduced in late 2007.

It is available in many variants such as apple, pear, strawberry, mixed fruit, strawberry and lime, sambucus, rhubarb, summer punch, raspberry, cherry, passionfruit, passionfruit and orange, rosé, spiced apple (apple and cinnamon), lemon and lime, alcohol free pear, alcohol free mixed fruit, mixed fruit tropical and Summer and Winter fruits.

In 2021, their entire range became vegan. Their non-alcoholic drinks had been vegan for some years, and their spirits since they were introduced.

In 2023, Kopparberg launched an alcoholic orange ginger beer.
