= Lindesberg =

Place in Västmanland, Sweden

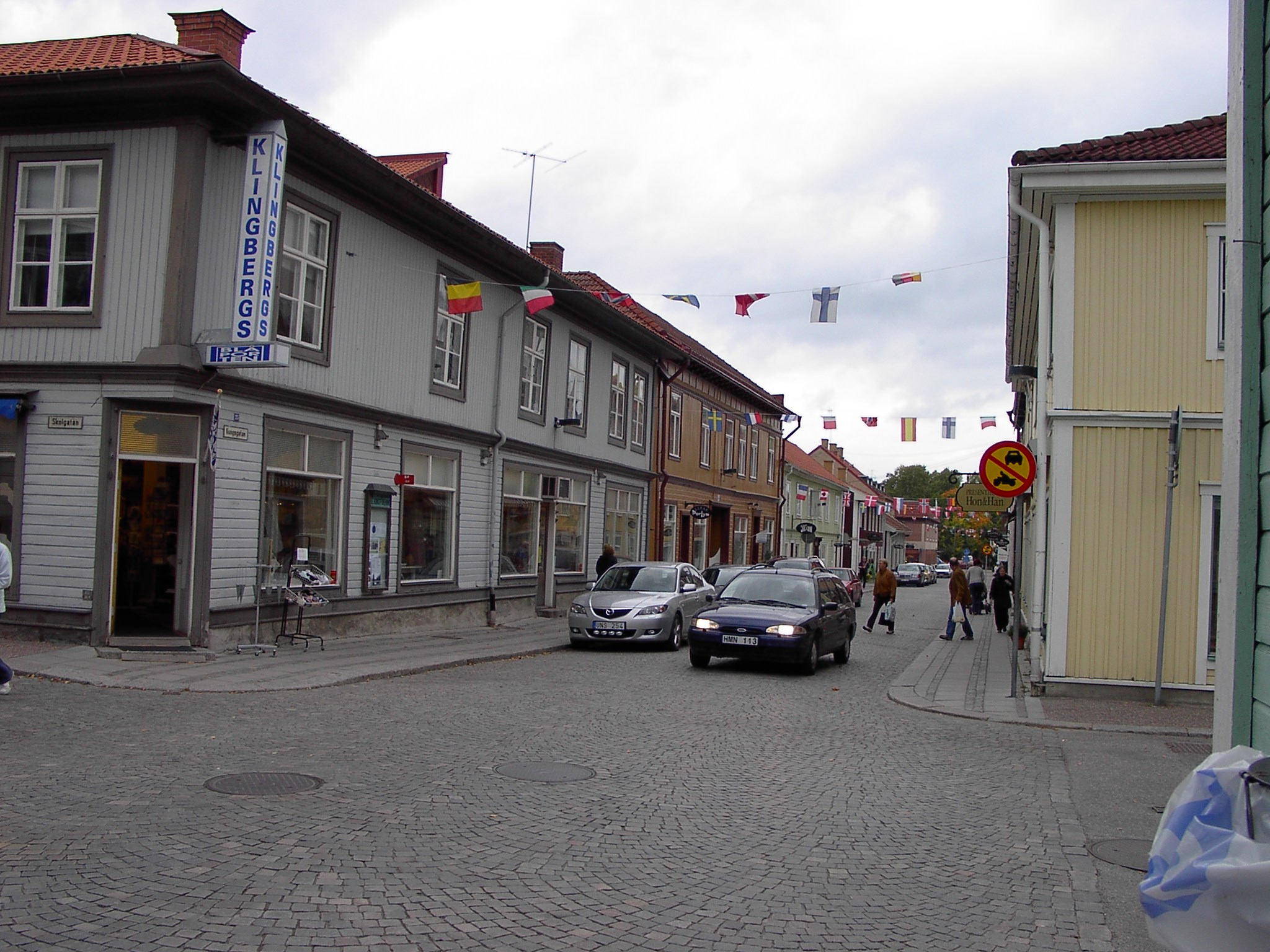
- Kungsgatan in Lindesberg

- Location within Örebro Location within Sweden
- Coordinates: 59°35′N 15°15′E
- Country: Sweden
- Province: Västmanland
- County: Örebro County
- Municipality: Lindesberg Municipality

Area
  - Total: 8.09 km^{2} (3.12 sq mi)

Population (2017)
  - Total: 9,672
  - Density: 1,195/km^{2} (3,100/sq mi)
- Time zone: UTC+1 (CET)
  - Summer (DST): UTC+2 (CEST)
- Website: lindesberg.se

Lindesberg (Swedish pronunciation: [lɪndɛsˈbærj]) is a locality and the seat of Lindesberg Municipality, Örebro County, Sweden with 9,672 inhabitants in 2017.

== History ==
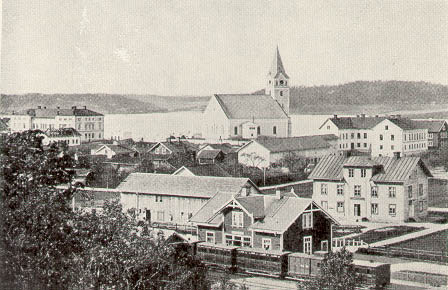
Lindesberg View in 1870

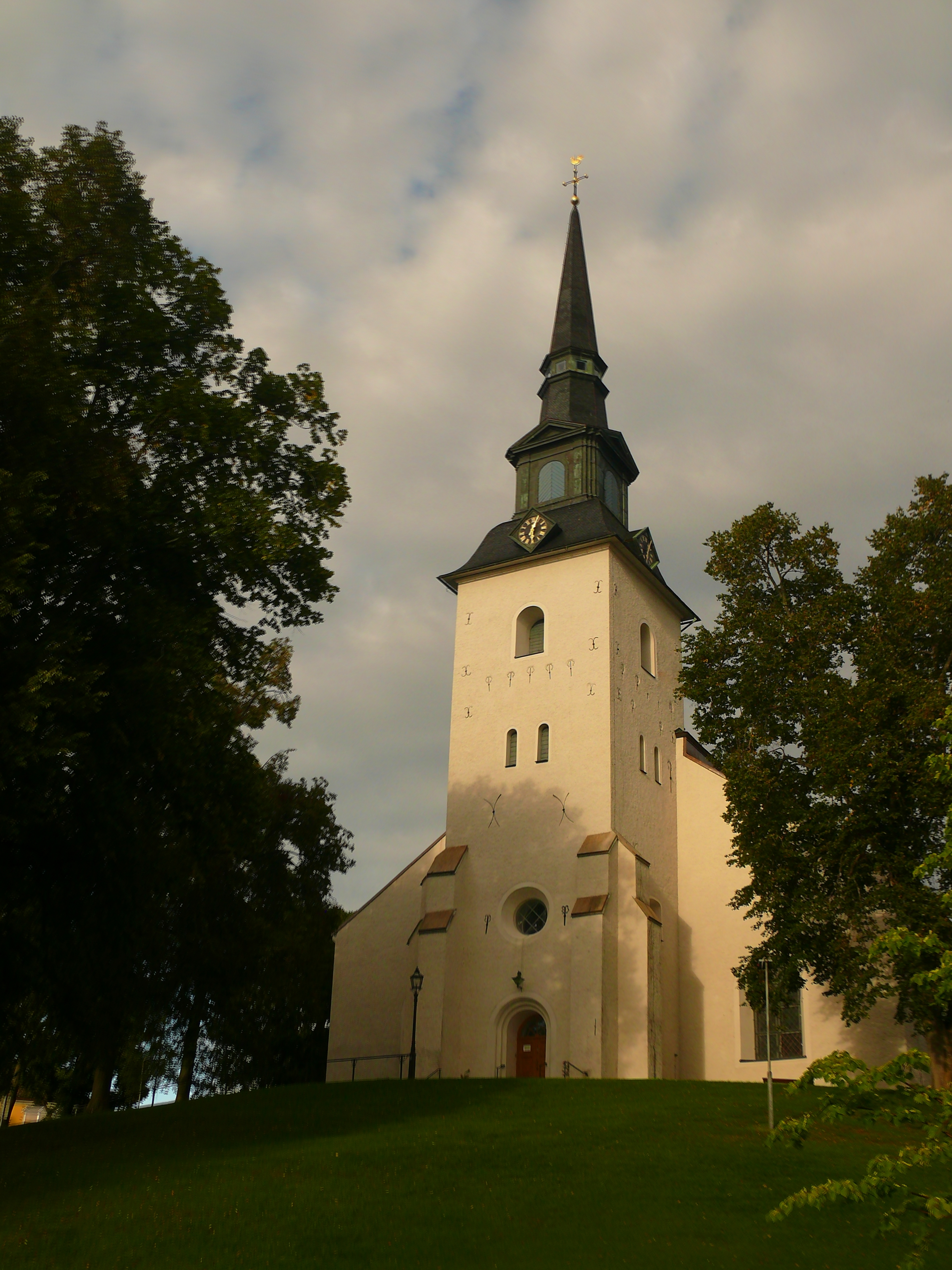
Church

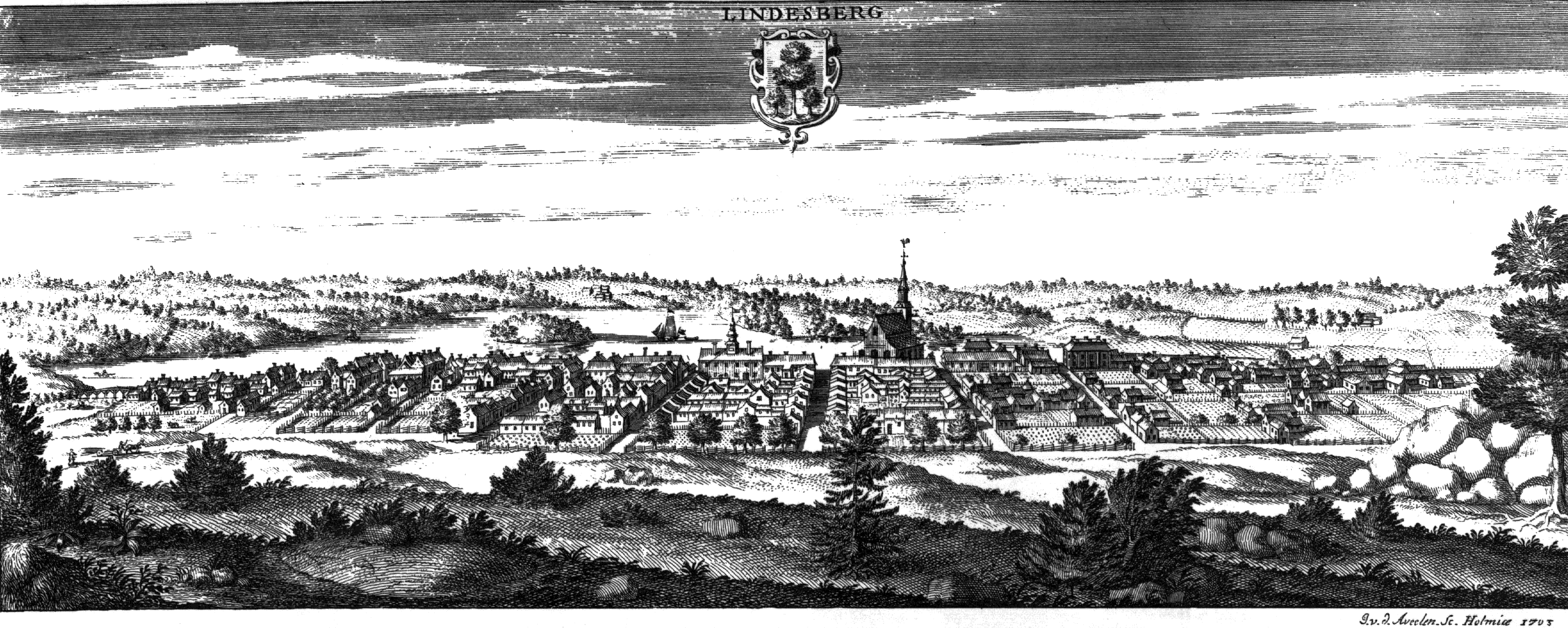
Lindesberg circa 1700, in Suecia Antiqua et Hodierna.

Lindesberg has centuries old history, being the center of an old mining district. The earliest known traces of a town are in the foundations of the 14th century stone church. That town was however known as Lindesås. It got its charter and current name in 1643, granted by Queen Christina, making it one of the now defunct Cities of Sweden. The name lind means the linden tree (Br. Eng. lime tree), which is why the coat of arms depicts a tree. The mining district Lindesberg was mentioned on the 16th century grand map Carta Marina.

== Notability ==
Between 1996 and 2007, the Augustibuller punk festival had been held in Lindesberg. The festival attracted more visitors each year and some of the bands who played were Desmond Dekker, Charged GBH, Bad Manners, Napalm Death and The Perishers. Due to low number of visitors in 2007, the planning for a 2008 festival began late and did not attract enough people to buy tickets. This eventually led to cancellation of 2008 festival, and later bankruptcy for the non-profit organization behind the festival. No more festivals were held after 2007.

The Tormek AB factory is located here, where they produce water-cooled sharpening systems for edged tools, which are exported world-wide.

== Sport ==
- IFK Lindesberg are an association football team who play at Fotbollsgatan 11.
- Lindebygdens Orienteringsklubb (orienteering) is adjacent to the football ground.
- Lindesbergs Golf Club is situated south of the locality.
- The Linde MSK Lindarna motorcycle speedway club are based north west of the locality at Hidingen 230. The track formerly known as the Motorbanen Hagalund hosted qualifying rounds of the Speedway World Championship in 1972, 1973, 1975 and 1976 and the team Lindarna raced in the Swedish Speedway Team Championship, winning division 2 in 1982..
