= Mörarp =

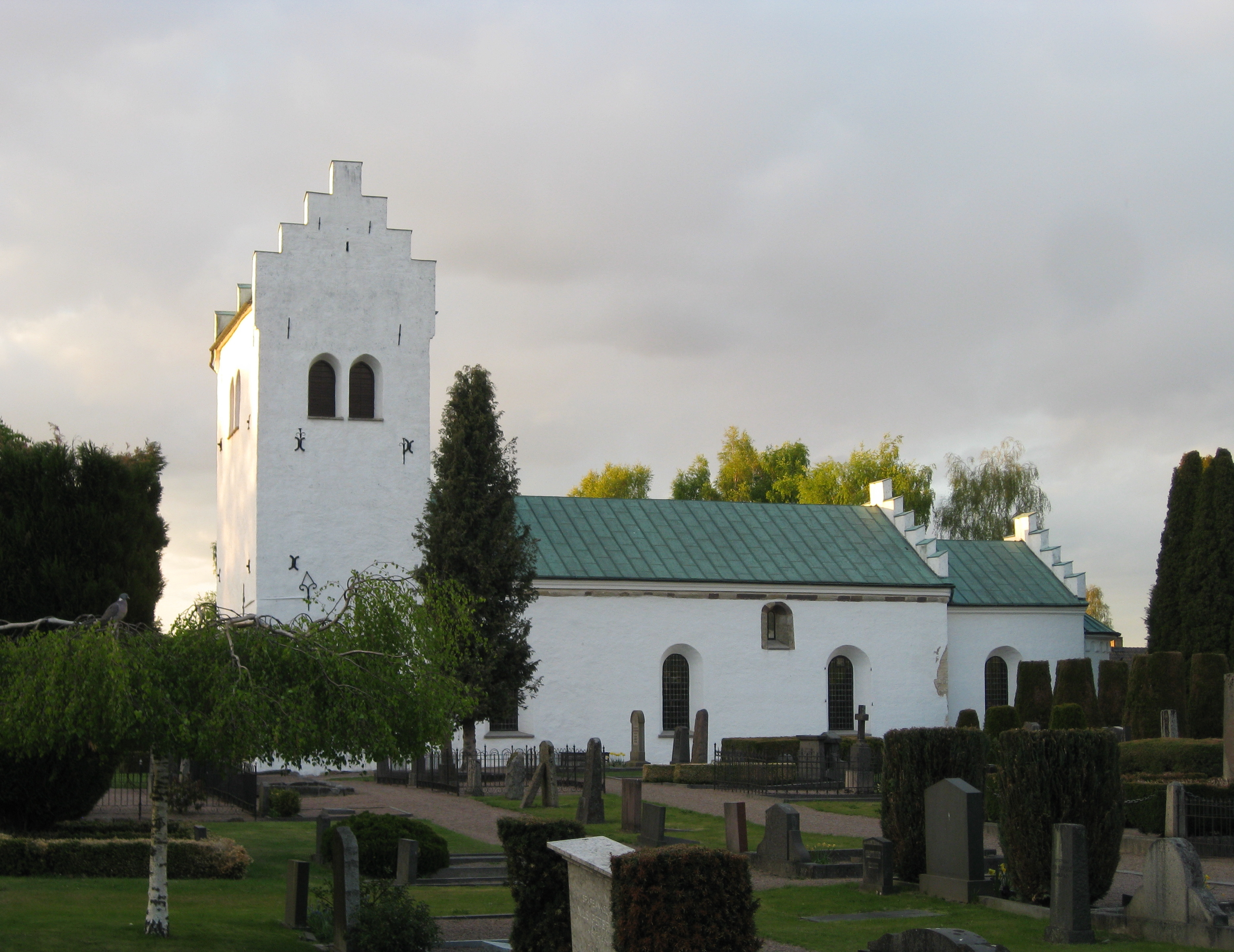
- Mörarp Church

- Location within Skåne Location within Sweden
- Coordinates: 56°04′N 12°52′E
- Country: Sweden
- Province: Skåne
- County: Skåne County
- Municipality: Helsingborg Municipality

Area
  - Total: 1.15 km^{2} (0.44 sq mi)

Population (31 December 2010)
  - Total: 1,893
  - Density: 1,648/km^{2} (4,270/sq mi)
- Time zone: UTC+1 (CET)
  - Summer (DST): UTC+2 (CEST)

Mörarp is a locality situated in Helsingborg Municipality, Skåne County, Sweden with 1,893 inhabitants in 2010.
