= Lindesberg Municipality =

Lindesberg Municipality Lindesbergs kommun
- Municipality
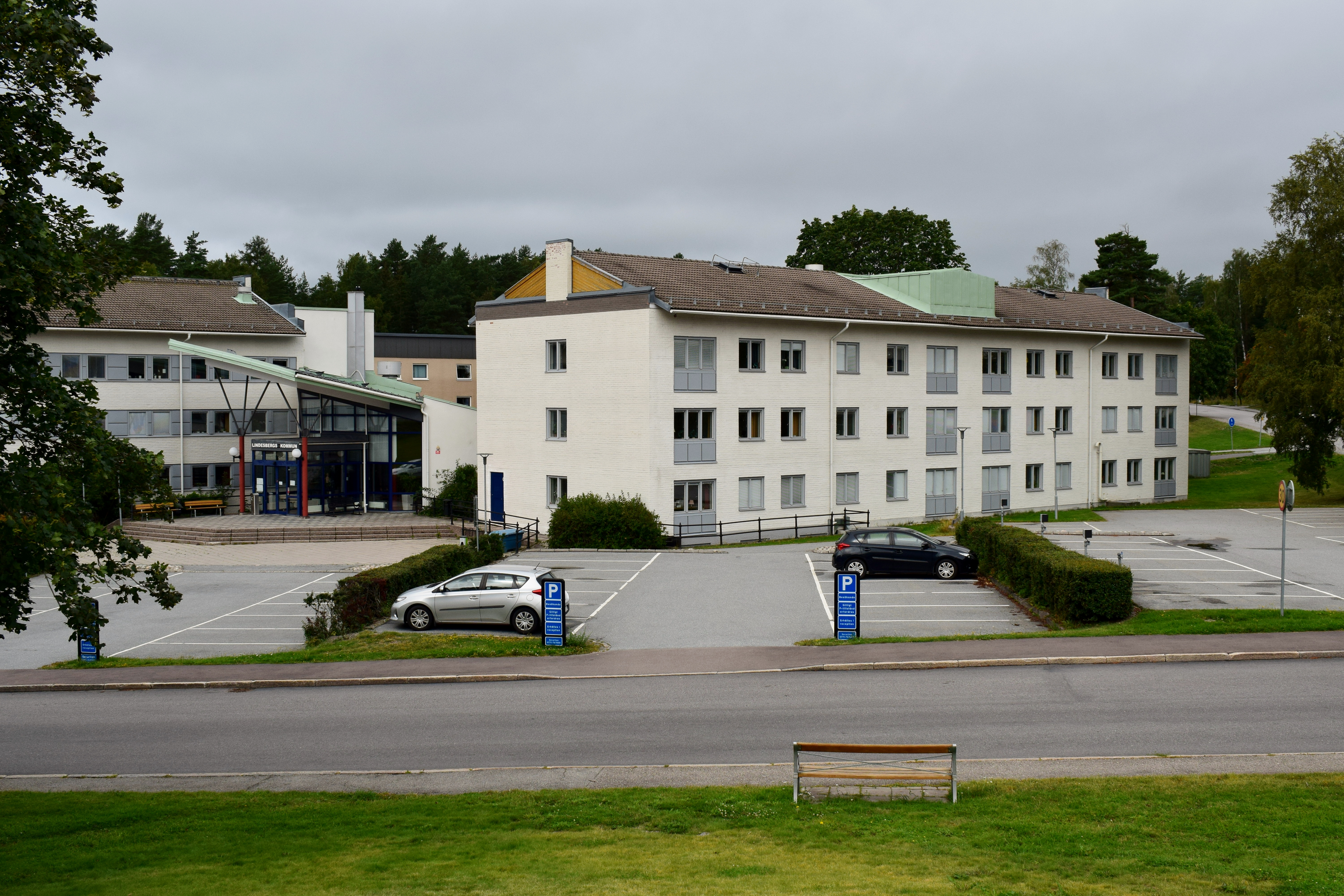

- Coat of arms

- Coordinates: 59°35′N 15°15′E
- Country: Sweden
- County: Örebro County
- Seat: Lindesberg

Area
  - Total: 1,480.5 km^{2} (571.6 sq mi)
  - Land: 1,377.59 km^{2} (531.89 sq mi)
  - Water: 102.91 km^{2} (39.73 sq mi)
- Area as of 1 January 2014.

Population (30 June 2025)
  - Total: 23,072
  - Density: 16.748/km^{2} (43.377/sq mi)
- Time zone: UTC+1 (CET)
  - Summer (DST): UTC+2 (CEST)
- ISO 3166 code: SE
- Province: Västmanland
- Municipal code: 1885
- Website: www.lindesberg.se

Lindesberg Municipality (Swedish: Lindesbergs kommun) is a municipality in Örebro County in central Sweden. Its seat is located in the city of Lindesberg.

The present municipality was created in 1971 when the former City of Lindesberg and the former market town of Frövi were joined.

== Localities ==
By size, as of 2000:

- Lindesberg (seat)
- Frövi
- Storå
- Fellingsbro
- Vedevåg
- Stråssa
- Gusselby
- Ramsberg
- Rockhammar
- Fryggesboda

== Riksdag elections ==
Year	%	Votes	V	S	MP	C	L	KD	M	SD	NyD	Left	Right
1973	90.9	15,758	3.9	45.9		31.3	7.5	2.4	8.6			49.8	47.4
1976	92.0	16,420	3.1	45.8		31.6	7.2	1.8	10.2			48.9	49.0
1979	90.4	16,377	4.2	47.3		25.0	7.5	2.1	13.5			51.5	45.9
1982	91.4	16,740	4.2	50.7	1.7	20.7	4.4	2.7	15.5			54.9	40.6
1985	89.7	16,559	4.5	49.0	2.5	18.3	10.3		15.0			53.5	43.6
1988	85.4	15,627	5.5	47.8	5.2	16.7	9.7	3.8	11.2			58.4	37.6
1991	85.9	15,756	4.6	43.3	3.0	12.3	7.5	8.5	13.7		6.6	47.9	42.0
1994	86.9	16,004	7.0	50.4	5.1	11.4	5.6	4.3	15.0		0.7	62.5	36.3
1998	80.3	14,382	13.7	41.1	4.5	8.6	3.1	11.5	15.6			59.3	38.9
2002	79.3	13,989	7.7	47.5	4.0	12.0	8.4	7.6	10.1	1.6		59.3	38.1
2006	81.3	14,165	5.3	43.5	3.6	12.4	4.4	5.4	18.2	5.1		52.4	40.3
2010	84.6	14,845	4.6	38.6	5.2	8.0	5.0	4.8	23.5	9.2		48.4	41.3
2014	86.8	15,348	4.3	36.9	4.7	7.5	2.8	3.7	16.9	20.9		45.9	30.8
2018	87.6	15,280	6.1	31.6	2.6	8.5	2.8	6.1	15.8	25.0		48.7	49.7
2022	84.5	15,053	5.1	30.2	3.2	6.0	2.7	5.4	15.5	30.1		44.5	53.7

== Demographics ==
This is a demographic table based on Lindesberg Municipality's electoral districts in the 2022 Swedish general election sourced from SVT's election platform, in turn taken from SCB official statistics.

In total there were 23,563 residents with 18,038 Swedish citizen adults eligible to vote. The political demographics were 44.5% for the left bloc and 53.7% for the right bloc. The northeastern part of Lindesberg has a majority of non-Swedish background. It also has the lowest median income and the lowest levels of employment, while the wealthiest district of Linde encircling the town has the highest share of Swedish background in the municipality. The town of Lindesberg leaned slightly to the left, whereas the countryside had very high shares for the right and in particular the Sweden Democrats. Indicators are in percentage points except population totals and income.

Location	Residents	Citizen adults	Left vote	Right vote	Employed	Swedish parents	Foreign heritage	Income SEK	Degree
Location			%	%					
Fellingsbro V	1,123	876	45.0	52.9	76	85	15	21,926	24
Fellingsbro Ö	1,389	1,076	41.7	55.7	75	82	18	22,187	25
Frövi V	1,847	1,458	48.9	48.7	80	82	18	24,708	26
Frövi Ö	1,626	1,226	47.0	52.1	84	89	11	27,595	34
Guldsmedshyttan	1,399	1,118	40.6	58.4	75	87	13	22,743	24
Gusselby	692	556	31.6	67.2	84	90	10	25,960	23
Linde	1,478	1,141	34.7	64.3	86	92	8	28,154	33
Lindesbergs M	2,199	1,767	50.3	48.1	76	78	22	21,711	32
Lindesbergs NÖ	1,879	1,118	61.7	36.9	62	37	63	18,379	25
Lindesbergs N	1,823	1,348	45.2	54.0	81	72	28	25,758	30
Lindesbergs SÖ	1,428	1,146	46.1	51.5	81	82	18	25,000	33
Lindesbergs V	2,118	1,631	46.7	51.9	83	83	17	26,477	35
Ramshyttan	679	586	42.1	55.4	83	88	12	23,694	34
Rockhammar	772	616	39.7	57.3	81	87	13	22,997	25
Storå	2,036	1,570	39.0	59.5	75	86	14	22,080	22
Vedevåg	1,075	805	41.9	55.8	79	82	18	24,777	29
Source: SVT

== Twin towns ==
Lindesberg's five twin towns with the year of its establishing:

1. (1940) Kuusankoski (Kouvola), Finland
2. (?) Oppdal Municipality, Norway
3. (?) Jammerbugt Municipality, Denmark
4. (1990) Frunzensky District, Saint Petersburg, Russia
5. (1995) Haßberge, Germany

== Industry ==
The largest employer is the municipality. After that follow the large hospital, serving the northern parts of Örebro County. Larger companies include Por Pac (Fagerdala Foams), Arvin Meritor and Liab.
