= Västmanland =

Historical province of Sweden

Coordinates: 59°45′N 16°20′E

- Historical province
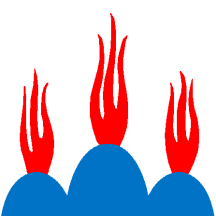
- Flag Coat of arms

- Country: Sweden
- Land: Svealand
- Counties: Västmanland, Örebo, Dalarna

Area
  - Total: 8,363 km^{2} (3,229 sq mi)

Population (31 December 2023)
  - Total: 320,335
  - Density: 38.30/km^{2} (99.21/sq mi)

Ethnicity
  - Languages: Swedish

Culture
  - Flower: Mistletoe
  - Animal: Roe deer
  - Bird: Crested tit
  - Fish: Pike-perch
- Time zone: UTC+1 (CET)
  - Summer (DST): UTC+2 (CEST)

Västmanland (Swedish pronunciation: [ˈvɛ̂sːtmanˌland] or [ˈvɛ̌sːt-]) is a historical Swedish province, or landskap, in middle Sweden. It borders Södermanland, Närke, Värmland, Dalarna and Uppland.

Västmanland means "West Man Land" or, less literally, "The Land of the Western Men", where the "western men" (västermännen) were the people living west of Uppland, the core province of early Sweden.

== Administration ==
The traditional provinces of Sweden serve no administrative or political purposes (except sometimes as sport districts), but are historical and cultural entities. In the case of Västmanland the corresponding administrative county, Västmanland County, constitutes the eastern part of the province. The western part is in Örebro County where the municipalities of Hällefors, Lindesberg, Ljusnarsberg and Nora are located.

== Heraldry ==
The coat of arms was granted in 1560. At the time, it featured one fire mountain, to represent the mine of Sala Municipality. Soon, their numbers were increased to three, to also symbolize the Lindesberg and Norberg/Skinnskatteberg mines and the present blazon was ratified in 1943. Blazon: "Argent, in base triple Mount Azure issuant from each Flames Gules." When crowned with a ducal coronet it represents the province. However rather different in size Västmanland County was granted the same arms in 1943. The counties may decorate the coat of arms with a royal crown.

== Geography ==
The terrain is to the north and north-west rocky. In these parts the highest mountains are located: Älvhöjden with 422 meters, and Gillersklack with 408 meters.

In the other parts it consists mostly of plains.

The largest lake is Mälaren marking the southern border, Sweden's third largest lake.

- National parks: Färnebofjärden

Western Västmanland traditionally belonged to the mining district of Bergslagen.

In 2014, the area around Ramnäs saw the largest forest fire in Sweden in modern times.

== History ==
The oldest city of Västmanland is Västerås, founded sometime around 990. The city was once the provincial capital; further, from 1120, it became the seat of the diocese of Västerås. Västerås is today also the largest city in the province, with 140,000 inhabitants in the municipality.

After that Arboga, was chartered in the 12th century, Köping in 1474, Sala in 1624; Lindesberg and Nora both in 1643, and finally Fagersta in 1944. With city status in Sweden being abolished in 1971, these are solely historical titles.

The mines of Norberg and Skinnskatteberg began being in use in the 14th century. The mine of Lindesberg was being cultivated in the early 16th century.

=== Dukes of Västmanland ===
Since 1772, Swedish Princes have been created Dukes of various provinces. This is solely a nominal title.

- Prince Erik (1889–1918)

== Culture ==
Engelsberg Ironworks is a UNESCO World Heritage Site.

== Notable residents ==
- Johan Wilhelm Dalman (1787–1828), physician and naturalist
- Carl Wilhelm von Scheele
- Mikael Mogren, bishop
- Axel Grönberg (1918-1988), wrestler

== Sports ==
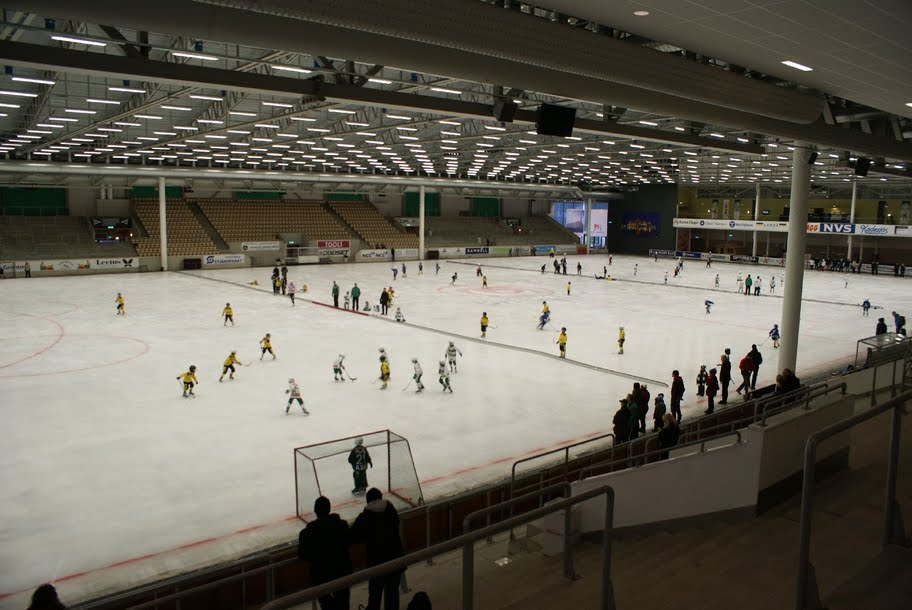
ABB Arena Syd, the largest permanent indoor arena for bandy in Sweden

Västerås SK is the most successful Swedish bandy team with 20 titles as of 2017. Several Bandy World Championship finals have been played in Västerås.

== Subdivisions ==
Västmanland was historically divided into districts. Within Bergslagen they were called mountain districts (bergslag), and in the rest of the province hundreds.

- Fellingsbro Hundred
- Norrbo Hundred
- Siende Hundred
- Simtuna Hundred
- Snevringe Hundred
- Tu Hundred
- Vagnsbro Hundred
- Yttertjurbo Hundred
- Åkerbo Hundred
- Övertjurbo Hundred
- Grythytte and Hällefors Mountain District
- Lindes and Ramsberg Mountain District
- New Kopparberg Mountain District
- Nora and Hjulsjö Mountain District
- Old Norberg Mountain District
- Skinnskatteberg Mountain District
