= Deutscher Comedypreis =

German comedy award

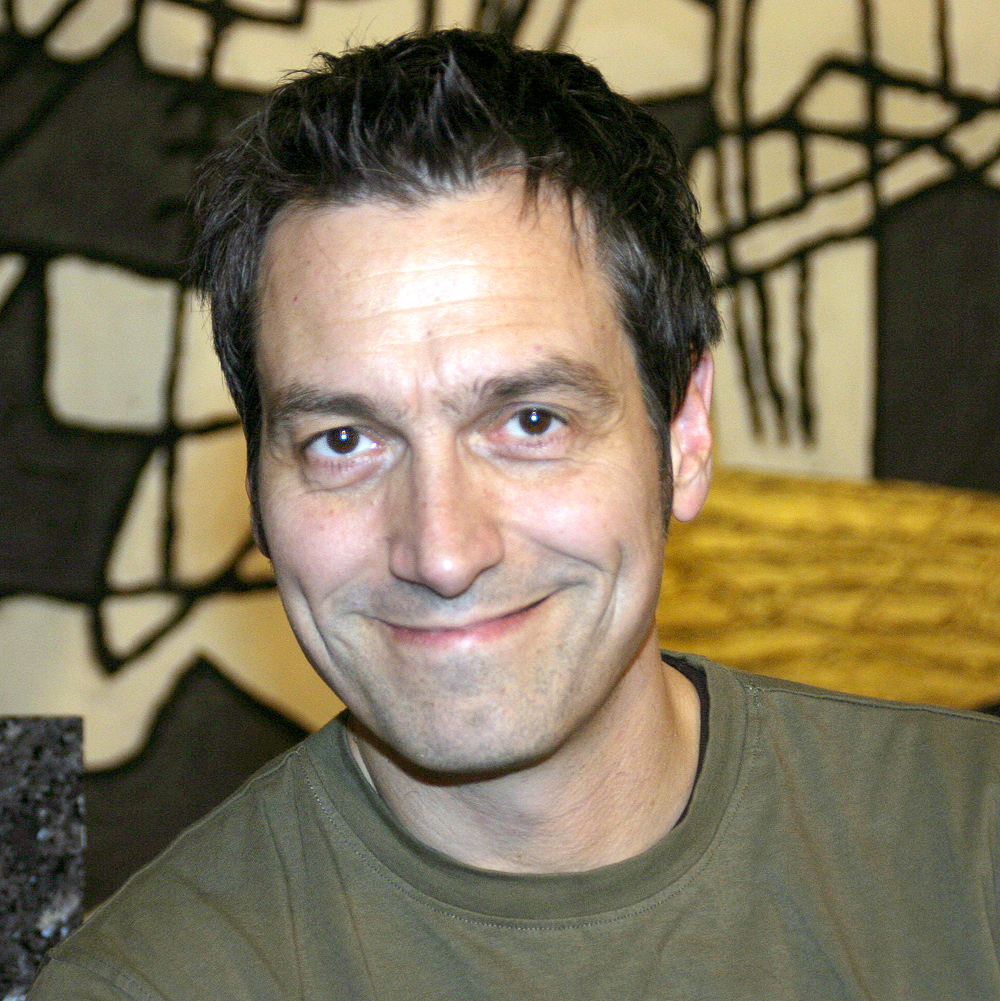
The host of the ceremony from 2008 to 2013, Dieter Nuhr in 2006

The Deutscher Comedypreis ("German Comedy Award") is awarded by Brainpool TV. Because Brainpool's in-house productions have received extensive awards, the designation as the German Comedy Award is controversial. The awards ceremony takes place annually in Cologne.

== Award winners ==
A list of all nominees and award winners since the beginning of the ceremony in 1997:

=== German Comedy Award 1997 ===
- German Comedy Award:
  - Renate Berger and Thomas Hermanns (for Quatsch Comedy Club)

=== German Comedy Award 1998 ===
- Best Comedyact: Oliver Kalkofe (for Kalkofes Mattscheibe)
- Best Comedyact - Newcomer: Marcus Jeroch
- Best Basis comedy: Titanic

=== German Comedy Award 1999 ===
17 December 1999; presented by Theo West

- Best Comedian, male: Michael Mittermeier
- Best Comedian, female: Gaby Köster (for Ritas Welt)
- Best Television comedy: Lukas
- Best Comedy show: Die Wochenshow
- Best Moderation: Stefan Raab (for TV total)
- Best Music comedy: Ö La Palöma Boys
- Best Humorous commercial: DEA-spot „Super Ingo!“
- Best Radio comedy: Elmar Brandt and Peter Burtz (for Die Gerd-Show)
- Honorary award: Karl Dall

=== German Comedy Award 2000 ===
12 December 2000; presented by Theo West and Atze Schröder

- Best Comedy act: Atze Schröder (for Alles Atze)
- Best Music comedy: Helge Schneider
- Best Comedian male/female in a supporting role: Franziska Traub (for Ritas Welt)
- Best Television comedy: Ritas Welt
- Best Comedy show: Quatsch Comedy Club
- Best Newcomer: Alf Poier
- Best Humorous commercial: Verona Feldbusch
- Special award for unintentional comedy: Tagesschau
- Honorary award: Jochen Busse
- Best Comedian, male (audience award): Michael Mittermeier
- Best Comedian, female (audience award): Anke Engelke (for Anke)

nominations: Mariele Millowitsch (for Nikola), Gaby Köster (for Ritas Welt)

=== German Comedy Award 2001 ===
2.November 2001; presented by Gaby Köster

- Best Comedian, male: Michael Bully Herbig (for Bullyparade)

nominations: Kaya Yanar (for Was guckst du?!), Michael Mittermeier

- Best Comedian, female: Anke Engelke (for Anke)

nominations: Cordula Stratmann (for Zimmer frei!), Annette Frier (for Die Wochenshow)

- Best Comedy show: Was guckst du?!

nominations: Freitag Nacht News, TV Total

- Best Television comedy: Ritas Welt

nominations: Alles Atze, Anke

- Best Comedy film: Der Schuh des Manitu
- Best Humorous commercial: (Audi)-Spot „Der Elvis-Fan“

nominations: Apollo-Optik, Media Markt

- Best Newcomer: Johann König
- Honorary award: Rudi Carrell

=== German Comedy Award 2002 ===
19 October 2002; presented by Gaby Köster and Atze Schröder

- Best Comedy show: Ladykracher

nominations: Bullyparade, Krüger sieht alles

- Best Television comedy: Hausmeister Krause – Ordnung muss sein

nominations: Die Camper, Mein Leben & Ich

- Best Comedian male/female in supporting role: Christoph Maria Herbst (for Ladykracher)

nominations: Dana Golombek (for Die Camper), Bettina Zimmermann (for Erkan & Stefan gegen die Mächte der Finsternis)

- Best Comedian, male: Markus Maria Profitlich (for Mensch Markus)

nominations: Bernd Stelter (for Bernds Hexe), Tom Gerhardt (for Hausmeister Krause – Ordnung muss sein)

- Best Comedian, female: Anke Engelke (for Ladykracher)

nominations: Cordula Stratmann (for Annemie Hülchrath – Der Talk), Mariele Millowitsch (for Nikola)

- Best Newcomer: Axel Stein (for Feuer, Eis & Dosenbier, Hausmeister Krause – Ordnung muss sein and More Ants in the Pants)

nominations: Felicitas Woll (for Berlin, Berlin), Elton (for Elton.tv)

- Best Live comedy: Michael Mittermeier (for Back to life)
- Best Comedy film: More Ants in the Pants

nominations: Erkan & Stefan gegen die Mächte der Finsternis, Feuer, Eis & Dosenbier

- Honorary Award: Otto Waalkes

=== German Comedy Award 2003 ===
11. October 2003; presented by Atze Schröder

- Best Comedian male/female: Bastian Pastewka (for Ohne Worte)

nominations: Anke Engelke (for Ladykracher), Kaya Yanar (for Was guckst du?!)

- Best Comedy show: Genial daneben – Die Comedy Arena

nominations: OLM!, TV Total

- Best Television comedy: Alles Atze

nominations: Bewegte Männer, Nikola

- Best Actor in a television comedy: Atze Schröder (for Alles Atze)

nominations: Axel Stein (for Axel!), Willi Thomczyk (for Die Camper)

- Best Actress in a television comedy: Gaby Köster (for Ritas Welt)

nominations: Heike Kloss (for Alles Atze), Julia Stinshoff (for Crazy Race)

- Best Sketch show: Ladykracher

nominations: Alt und durchgeknallt, Ohne Worte

- Best Newcomer: Ralf Schmitz (for Die dreisten Drei)

nominations: Johnny Challah (for Axel!), Mirja Boes (for Die dreisten Drei)

- Best Live act: Dieter Nuhr
- TV Special award: Anke Engelke
- Honorary award: Dieter Hallervorden
- Special award for First successful German television comedy-show: Klimbim

=== German Comedy Award 2004 ===
17 October 2004; presented by Atze Schröder

- Best Comedian male/female: Michael Bully Herbig (for (T)Raumschiff Surprise - Periode 1)

nominations: Atze Schröder, Bastian Pastewka, Hans Werner Olm

- Best Comedy show: OLM!

nominations: Zimmer frei!, Rent a Pocher

- Best Television comedy: Familie Heinz Becker

nominations: Mein Leben & Ich, Was nicht passt, wird passend gemacht

- Best Actor in a television comedy: Ingo Naujoks (for Bewegte Männer)

nominations: Walter Sittler (for Nikola), Ralf Richter (for Was nicht passt, wird passend gemacht)

- Best Actress in a television comedy: Wolke Hegenbarth (for Mein Leben & Ich)

nominations: Janine Kunze (for Hausmeister Krause – Ordnung muss sein), Arzu Bazman (for Schulmädchen)

- Best Moderation: Hape Kerkeling (for Die 70er Show)

nominations: Sonja Zietlow and Dirk Bach (for Ich bin ein Star – Holt mich hier raus!), Oliver Pocher and Kai Pflaume (for Wok-WM)

- Best Sketch show: Mensch Markus

nominations: Die dreisten Drei, Tramitz and Friends

- Best Newcomer: Hennes Bender

nominations: Ingo Oschmann, Mario Barth

- Best Live comedy: Michael Mittermeier
- Best Comedy film: (T)Raumschiff Surprise - Periode 1
- Honorary award: Emil Steinberger
- Special award: 7 Tage, 7 Köpfe

=== German Comedy Award 2005 ===
15 October 2005; presented by Atze Schröder

- Best Comedy show: Rent a Pocher

nominations: Hape trifft!, Freitag Nacht News, Kalkofes Mattscheibe

- Best Television comedy: Alles Atze

nominations: Stromberg, Axel! will's wissen, Mein Leben & Ich

- Best Actor/Actress in a television comedy: Christoph Maria Herbst (for Stromberg)

nominations: Wolke Hegenbarth, Sabine Pfeifer, Rick Kavanian

- Best Sketch show: Bully & Rick

nominations: Ohne Worte, Die dreisten Drei, Tramitz and Friends

- Best Comedian, male: Hape Kerkeling

nominations: Bully Herbig, Ralf Schmitz, Oliver Pocher

- Best Comedian, female: Cordula Stratmann

nominations: Mirja Boes, Hella von Sinnen, Gaby Köster

- Best Improvisational comedy, TV: Schillerstraße

nominations: Frei Schnauze, Dittsche, Genial daneben

- Best Comedy film: 7 Zwerge – Männer allein im Wald
- Best Newcomer: Kurt Krömer
- Best Live comedy: Mario Barth
- Honorary award: Helge Schneider

=== German Comedy Award 2006 ===
10 October 2006; presented by Atze Schröder

- Best Comedy show: Genial daneben – Die Comedy Arena

nominations: Hape trifft!, Schmitz komm raus!

- Best Television comedy: Pastewka

nominations: Stromberg, Mein Leben & Ich

- Best Sketch comedy: Mensch Markus

nominations: Die dreisten Drei, Sechserpack

- Best Comedy film: Ladyland

nominations: Arme Millionäre, Die ProSieben Märchenstunde

- Best Comedian, male: Hape Kerkeling

nominations: Oliver Pocher, Ralf Schmitz

- Best Comedian, female: Hella von Sinnen

nominations: Cordula Stratmann, Mirja Boes

- Best Actor: Christoph Maria Herbst

nominations: Bastian Pastewka, Sky du Mont

- Best Actress: Andrea Sawatzki

nominations: Anke Engelke, Wolke Hegenbarth

- Best Live comedy: Mario Barth
- Best Newcomer: Paul Panzer
- Best Comedian, international: Borat (alias Sacha Baron Cohen)
- Special award: Horst Schlämmer (alias Hape Kerkeling)
- Honorary Award: Jürgen von der Lippe

=== German Comedy Award 2007 ===
23 Oktober 2007; presented by Atze Schröder

- Best Sketch show: Switch reloaded

nominations: Bully & Rick, Kargar trifft den Nagel

- Best Television comedy: Kinder, Kinder

nominations: Türkisch für Anfänger, Pastewka

- Beste Comedy show: Frei Schnauze XXL

nominations: Extreme Activity, Paul Panzers 33

- Best Actor in a television comedy: Christoph Maria Herbst

nominations: Christian Ulmen, Heinrich Schafmeister

- Best Actress in a television comedy: Anke Engelke

nominations: Carolin Kebekus, Josefine Preuß

- Best Newcomer: Cindy aus Marzahn

nominations: Der unglaubliche Heinz, Stefan Schramm & Christoph Walther

- Best Comedian, male: Hape Kerkeling

nominations: Oliver Pocher, Mario Barth

- Best Comedian, female: Gaby Köster

nominations: Mirja Boes, Cordula Stratmann

- Best Comedy film: 7 Zwerge - Der Wald ist nicht genug
- Best Live comedy: Mario Barth
- Honorary award: Loriot

=== German Comedy Award 2008 ===
21 October 2008; presented by Dieter Nuhr

- Best Television comedy: Doctor's Diary

nominations: Maddin in Love, Herzog, Two Funny

- Best Comedy show: Elton vs. Simon - Die Show

nominations: Achtung! Hartwich, Krömer - Die Internationale Show

- Best Comedy event: Fröhliche Weihnachten! - mit Wolfgang & Anneliese

nominations: 20 Jahre Mittermeier, Happy Otto - Wir haben Grund zum Feiern

- Best Sketch comedy: Switch reloaded

nominations: Wunderbar, Two Funny

- Best Actor: Michael Kessler

nominations: Christian Ulmen, Dirk Bach

- Best Actress: Nora Tschirner

nominations: Judith Richter, Susan Sideropoulos

- Best Newcomer: Olaf Schubert
- Best Comedian, male: Michael Mittermeier

nominations: Oliver Pocher, Mario Barth

- Best Comedian, female: Mirja Boes

nominations: Anke Engelke, Cindy aus Marzahn

- Best German comedy film: Keinohrhasen
- Best Live comedy: Mario Barth
- Honorary award: Hugo Egon Balder

=== German Comedy Award 2009 ===
20 October 2009; presented by Dieter Nuhr

- Best Television comedy: Doctor's Diary

nominations: Der kleine Mann, Der Lehrer

- Best Comedy show: heute-show

nominations: Cindy aus Marzahn & Die jungen Wilden, TV-Helden

- Best Late-Night-Show: Inas Nacht

Krömer - Die Internationale Show, TV total

- Best Comedy event: Quatsch Goes Christmas - Die große Comedy Winter Show

nominations: 100 Jahre Heinz Erhardt, World of Comedy

- Best Sketch comedy: Ladykracher

nominations: 4 Singles, Switch Reloaded

- Best Candid camera show: Comedystreet

nominations: Böse Mädchen, Verstehen Sie Spaß?

- Best Stand-up, TV: Schizophren - Ich wollte 'ne Prinzessin sein (Cindy aus Marzahn)

nominations: Safari (Michael Mittermeier), Verschmitzt (Ralf Schmitz)

- Best Comedy film: Zwei Weihnachtsmänner

nominations: Ein Mann, ein Fjord!, Schade um das schöne Geld

- Best Actor: Max Giermann

nominations: Bastian Pastewka, Hape Kerkeling

- Best Actress: Martina Hill

nominations: Anke Engelke, Diana Amft

- Best Comedian, male: Dieter Nuhr

nominations: Mario Barth, Ralf Schmitz

- Best Comedian, female: Cindy aus Marzahn

nominations: Ina Müller, Mirja Boes

- Best German comedy film: Wickie und die starken Männer
- Best Live comedy: Mario Barth
- Honorary Award: Mike Krüger
- Best Newcomer: Bülent Ceylan

=== German Comedy Award 2010 ===
14 October 2010; presented by Dieter Nuhr

- Best Television comedy: Danni Lowinski

nominations: Pastewka, Stromberg

- Best Comedy show: heute-show

nominations: Cindy aus Marzahn & Die jungen Wilden, Willkommen bei Mario Barth

- Best Late-Night-Show: TV total

nominations: Aufgemerkt! Pelzig unterhält sich, Inas Nacht

- Best Comedy event: Fröhliche Weihnachten! – mit Wolfgang & Anneliese

nominations: Der große Comedy Adventskalender, Switch Reloaded – Der Jahresrückblick

- Best Sketch comedy: Ladykracher

nominations: Dennis und Jesko, Ich bin Boes

- Best Stand-up, TV: Johann König live! Total Bock auf Remmi Demmi

nominations: Kaya Yanar – Live und unzensiert, René Marik live! Autschn!

- Best Comedy film: Barfuß bis zum Hals

nominations: C.I.S. – Chaoten im Sondereinsatz, Live Is Life

- Best Actor: Christoph Maria Herbst

nominations: Bastian Pastewka, Jan Josef Liefers

- Best Actress: Annette Frier

nominations: Anke Engelke, Diana Amft

- Best Comedian, male: Dieter Nuhr

nominations: Eckart von Hirschhausen, Matze Knop

- Best Comedian, female: Cindy aus Marzahn

nominations: Mirja Boes, Monika Gruber

- Best German comedy film: Zweiohrküken
- Best Live comedy: Mario Barth
- Honorary award: Herbert Feuerstein
- Best Newcomer: Dave Davis

=== German Comedy Award 2011 ===
18 October 2011; presented by Dieter Nuhr

- Best Comedian, male: Bülent Ceylan

nominations: Atze Schröder, René Marik

- Best Comedian, female: Cindy aus Marzahn

nominations: Carolin Kebekus, Mirja Boes

- Best Actor: Bastian Pastewka

nominations: Matthias Matschke, Max Giermann

- Best Actress: Martina Hill

nominations: Annette Frier, Anke Engelke

- Best Comedy show: heute-show

nominations: Kaya Yanar & Paul Panzer - Stars bei der Arbeit, Die Bülent Ceylan Show

- Best Late-Night-Show: Pelzig hält sich

nominations: TV total, Inas Nacht

- Best Television comedy: Danni Lowinski

nominations: Pastewka, Doctor's Diary

- Best Sketch comedy: Ladykracher

nominations: Switch Reloaded, 4 Singles

- Best Comedy event: Hapes zauberhafte Weihnachten

nominations: Fröhlicher Frühling mit Wolfgang & Anneliese, Der Comedy-Olymp

- Best Stand-up, TV: Atze Schröder live! Revolution

nominations: Cindy aus Marzahn live! Nicht jeder Prinz kommt uff'm Pferd, Sascha Grammel live! Hetz mich nicht!

- Best Comedy film: Kokowääh
- Best Comedy film, TV: Neue Vahr Süd

nominations: Kung Fu Mama, Undercover Love

- Best Live comedy: Mario Barth
- Honorary award: Hella von Sinnen
- Best newcomer: Sascha Grammel

=== German Comedy Award 2012 ===
23 October 2011; presented by Dieter Nuhr

- Best Comedian, male: Oliver Welke

nominations: Bülent Ceylan, Kaya Yanar

- Best Comedian, female: Cindy aus Marzahn

nominations: Monika Gruber, Mirja Boes

- Best Actor: Bjarne Mädel

nominations: Christoph Maria Herbst, Detlev Buck

- Best Actress: Martina Hill

nominations: Annette Frier, Anke Engelke

- Best Comedy show: heute-show

nominations: Nicht nachmachen!, Die Bülent Ceylan Show

- Best Television comedy: Crime Scene Cleaner (Der Tatortreiniger)

nominations: Danni Lowinski, Stromberg

- Best Sketch comedy: Knallerfrauen

nominations: Ich bin Boes, Ladykracher

- Best Comedy event: Elton vs. Simon - Die Live-Show

nominations: Der Comedy Olymp, Der große Comedy Adventskalender

- Best Stand-up, TV: Olaf Schubert live! Meine Kämpfe

nominations: Dr. Eckart von Hirschhausen live! Liebesbeweise, Michael Mittermeier live! Achtung Baby!

- Best Comedy film: Turkish for Beginners
- Best Comedy film, TV: Stankowskis Millionen

nominations: Das große Comeback, Männer ticken, Frauen anders

- Best Live comedy: Bülent Ceylan
- Honorary award: Gaby Köster
- Best newcomer: David Werker
- Specialprize: Thomas Hermanns (for 20 Years Quatsch Comedy Club)

=== German Comedy Award 2013 ===
15 October 2013; presented by Dieter Nuhr

- Best Comedian, male: Olaf Schubert

nominations: Paul Panzer, Mario Barth

- Best Comedian, female: Carolin Kebekus

nominations: Monika Gruber, Cindy aus Marzahn

- Best Actor: Bastian Pastewka

nominations: Bjarne Mädel, Dietrich Hollinderbäumer

- Best Actress: Martina Hill

nominations: Anke Engelke, Annette Frier

- Best Comedy show: Circus HalliGalli

nominations: Die Bülent Ceylan Show, heute-show, Krömer – Late Night Show, Paul Panzer – Stars bei der Arbeit

- Best Television comedy: Pastewka

nominations: Die LottoKönige, Crime Scene Cleaner (Der Tatortreiniger)

- Best Sketch comedy: Ladykracher

nominations: In jeder Beziehung, Knallerfrauen

- Best Comedy event: Die Große TV total Prunksitzung

nominations: Der RTL Comedy Grand Prix, Switch reloaded - Wetten dass..? Spezial

- Best Stand-up, TV: Kaya live! All inclusive

nominations: Atze live! Schmerzfrei, Paul Panzer live! Hart Backbord - Noch ist die Welt zu retten!

- Best hosts: Sonja Zietlow & Daniel Hartwich at Ich bin ein Star - Holt mich hier raus!

nominations: Oliver Welke & Olaf Schubert at Deutscher Fernsehpreis 2012, Anke Engelke at Unser Song für Malmö

- Best Comedy film: Kokowääh 2
- Best Live comedy: Mario Barth
- Honorary award: Tom Gerhardt
- Best newcomer: Luke Mockridge
