= Bernhard Hoëcker =

German comedian, actor and TV presenter (born 1970)

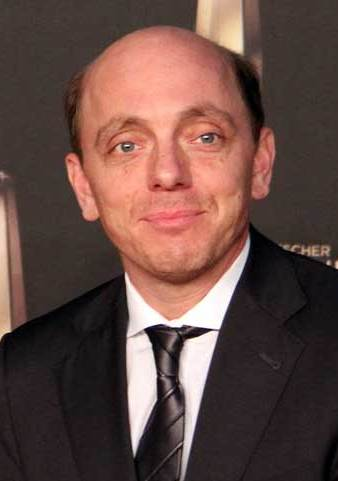
- Hoëcker at the 2012 German Television Awards
- Born: Bernhard Hoecker; 20 March 1970 (age 56); Neustadt an der Weinstraße, Germany
- Occupations: Comedian; actor; television presenter
- Spouse: Eva von Mühlenfels
- Children: 2
- Website: bernhard-hoecker.de

Bernhard Hoëcker ([ˈhoːʔɛkɐ]; proper name Bernhard Hoecker-von Mühlenfels; 20 March 1970) is a German comedian, actor and television presenter. He is best known for the spoof show Switch, as well as being a permanent member of the previous Genial guessing team (2003–2011) Genial Daneben.

== Biography ==
Hoëcker grew up in Frankfurt. At the age of 10, he moved to Bonn with his family. He finished his Abitur (equivalent of the US high school diploma) at the Clara-Schumann-Gymnasium. Between 1993 and 1996, Hoëcker studied economics up to intermediate diploma level (German: Vordiplom) at the University of Bonn and quit his studies thereafter.

Hoëcker works on German broadcasters as comedian and actor.

Hoëcker is married to Eva von Mühlenfels, has two daughters and lives with his family in Bonn. However, as Hoëcker pointed out in the program Missverstehen Sie mich richtig (Translated:) "Do you misunderstand me correctly", this statement is not correct. He did, however, not specify which part of the statement was not correct.

In his free time, he does geocaching, among other things.

== Works ==
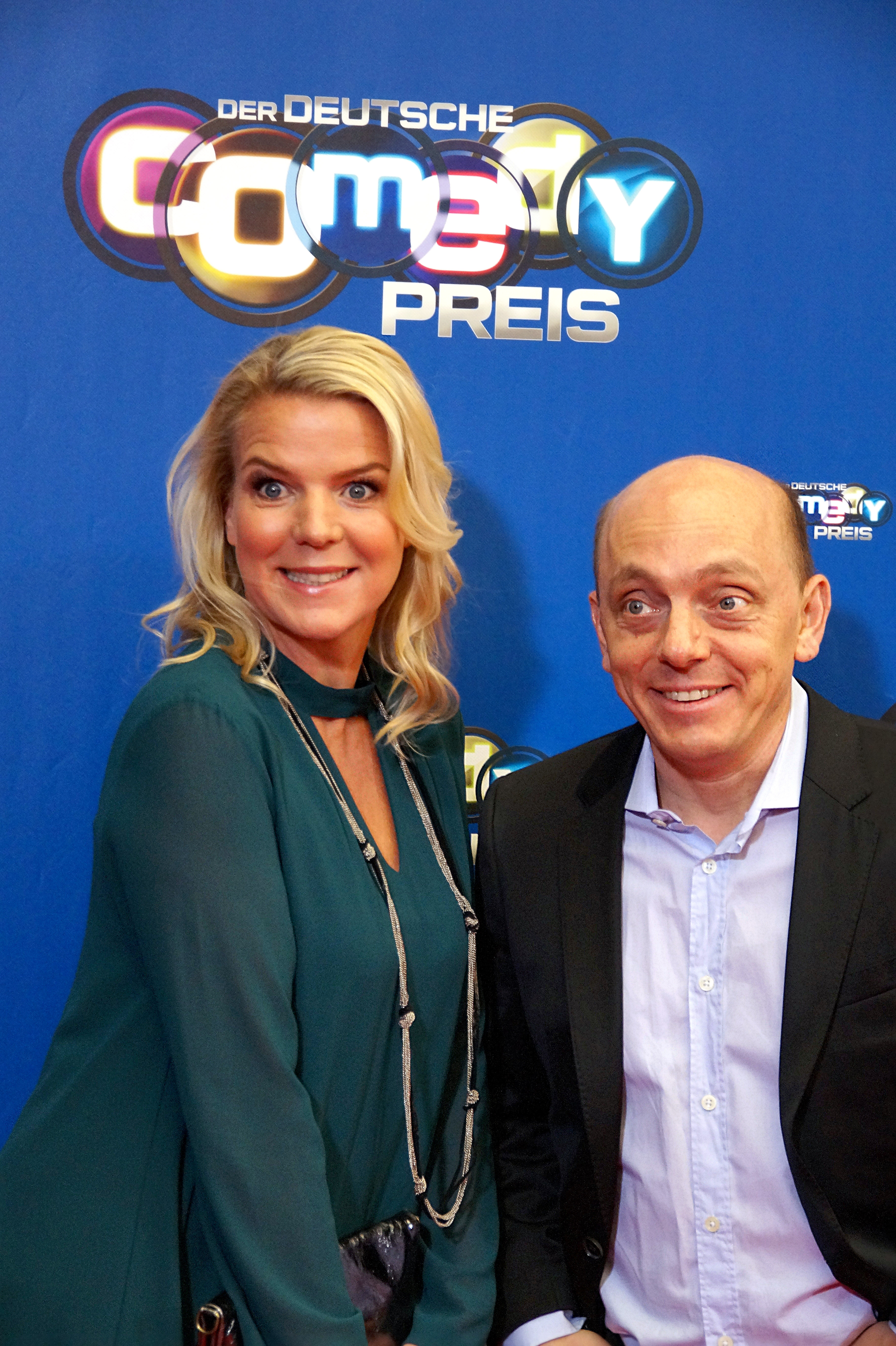
Hoëcker with Mirja Boes at the 2016 German Comedy Awards

=== Filmography ===
- 2001: Du oder keine
- 2004: Germanikus
- 2005: Der Clown
- 2006: Die ProSieben Märchenstunde
- 2006: Ab durch die Hecke (German voice of Verne)
- 2006: Cedric (short films, German voice of Cedric)
- 2008: Spiel mir das Lied und du bist tot!
- 2008: Instructor Schmidt
- 2010: Für immer Shrek (German voice of Rumpelstilzchen)
- 2011: Robin Hood (musical video by Edguy)
- 2013: Badaboom (musical video by Van Canto)
- 2014: Danni Lowinski: Alles futsch

=== Shows (as a regular) ===
- 1997–2000: Switch (broadcaster ProSieben)
- 2001: C.O.P.S. – Die Pannenshow (with Ingolf Lück, broadcaster Sat1)
- 2003–2011: Genial daneben – Die Comedy Arena (Sat1)
- 2004–2011: Schillerstraße (Sat1)
- 2006: Was denkt Deutschland? (moderation, Sat1)
- 2007–2012: Switch reloaded (ProSieben)
- 2010: Ent-oder-Weder! (ZDFneo)
- 2012–2013: Nicht nachmachen! (ZDF)
- 2013: Durchgedreht! (ZDF)
- since 2014: Kaum zu glauben! (NDR)
- since 2014: Ohne Garantie (ZDF)
- since 2014: Vier sind das Volk (ZDF)
- since 2015: Wer weiß denn sowas? (ARD)

=== Shows (as guest) ===
- Blondes Gift (2001, 3 August 2002)
- Die Pisashow
- Clever! – Die Show, die Wissen schafft
- NightWash
- Das Quiz mit Jörg Pilawa (2001, Prominentenspecial, 18 March 2004)
- Anke Late Night (2004, episode: 1.14, 10 June 2004)
- Wer wird Millionär? (2004, Prominentenspecial, 25 November 2004)
- Das große Prominenten-Turnen, 19 May 2005
- Extreme Activity (2007)
- Johannes B. Kerner (2007)
- Peppers – Das Comedycamp (3 May 2008)
- Verbotene Liebe, August 2008
- Löwenzahn (November 2008)
- Star-Quiz (8 October 2009, 13 August 2011)
- Ladykracher (Gastrollen)
- Super-Champion (21 April 2012, 25 August 2012)
- Jetzt wird's schräg (25 July 2014)
- Das ist spitze (18 December 2014)

=== Discography ===
==== Albums ====
- Hoëcker, Sie sind raus – Comedy vom Kleinsten
- 2007: Aufzeichnungen eines Schnitzeljägers
- 2007: Ich hab's gleich

==== DVD ====
- 2008: Ich hab's gleich - Live!

=== Bibliography ===
- Aufzeichnungen eines Schnitzeljägers: Mit Gëocaching zurück zur Natur, Rowohlt Verlag, 2007, ISBN 978-3-499-62252-6
- Meilenweit für kein Kamel: Eine ungewöhnliche Reise vom Allgäu in den Orient, Rowohlt Verlag, 2010, ISBN 978-3-499-62639-5
- Wir sind Deutschland!: Ein illustrer Streifzug durch die deutsche Geschichte, Lappan Verlag, 2011, ISBN 978-3-8303-3248-0
- Hoëckers Entdeckungen: Ein merkwürdiges Bilderbuch längst vergessener Orte, riva Verlag, 2011, ISBN 978-3-86883-172-6
- Am schönsten Arsch der Welt: Bekenntnisse eines Neuseelandreisenden, Bastei Lübbe, 2012, ISBN 978-3-40460-739-6
- Neues aus Geocaching: Geschichten von draußen, traveldiary Verlag, 2014, ISBN 978-3-944365-29-9
