= Ilka Bessin =

German comedian and actress

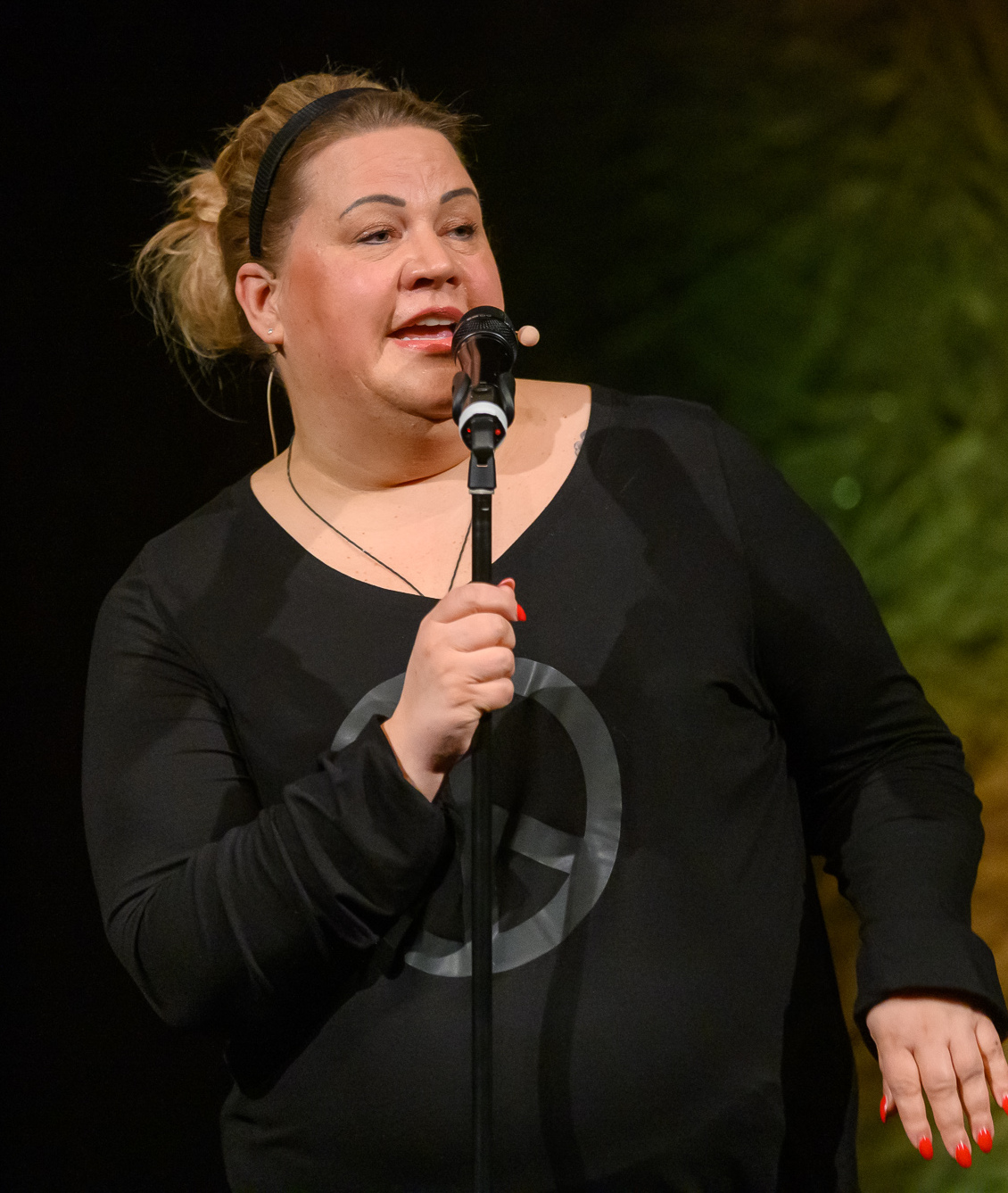
- Bessin in 2020
- Born: 18 November 1971 (age 54); Luckenwalde, East Germany
- Occupations: Actress, comedian
- Years active: 2004–present

Ilka Bessin (born 18 November 1971) is a German comedian and actress, best known for her role as Cindy aus Marzahn (German for "Cindy from Marzahn").

== Early life ==
Ilka Bessin was born in Luckenwalde, East Germany. After finishing school, she studied culinary arts and later trained to be a hotel manager. She worked as a chef until the Berlin Wall fell in 1989, and Germany was reunified. After that she became a bartender and a discothèque manager. In 1999, she began a totally new career as an entertainment director and comedy performer on a cruise liner. It was there that she invented her most famous character "Cindy aus Marzahn." Marzahn is a blue collar section of the former East Berlin.

== Career start ==
In 2004, Ilka won the final season of the ProSieben network's Quatsch Comedy Club stand-up show. With this win, her career as a comedian and actress began. In 2009, she was set in the role of the landlady Ilka in the Sat.1 comedy show Schillerstraße. In January 2010, she started her own comedy show, named Cindy aus Marzahn und die jungen Wilden ("Cindy from Marzahn and the Wild Youth"). In spring 2011, the third season started Nicht jeder Prinz kommt uff'm Pferd! ("Not Every Prince Comes on a Horse"). Followed by the Pink is Bjutiful 2013.

== Cindy aus Marzahn ==
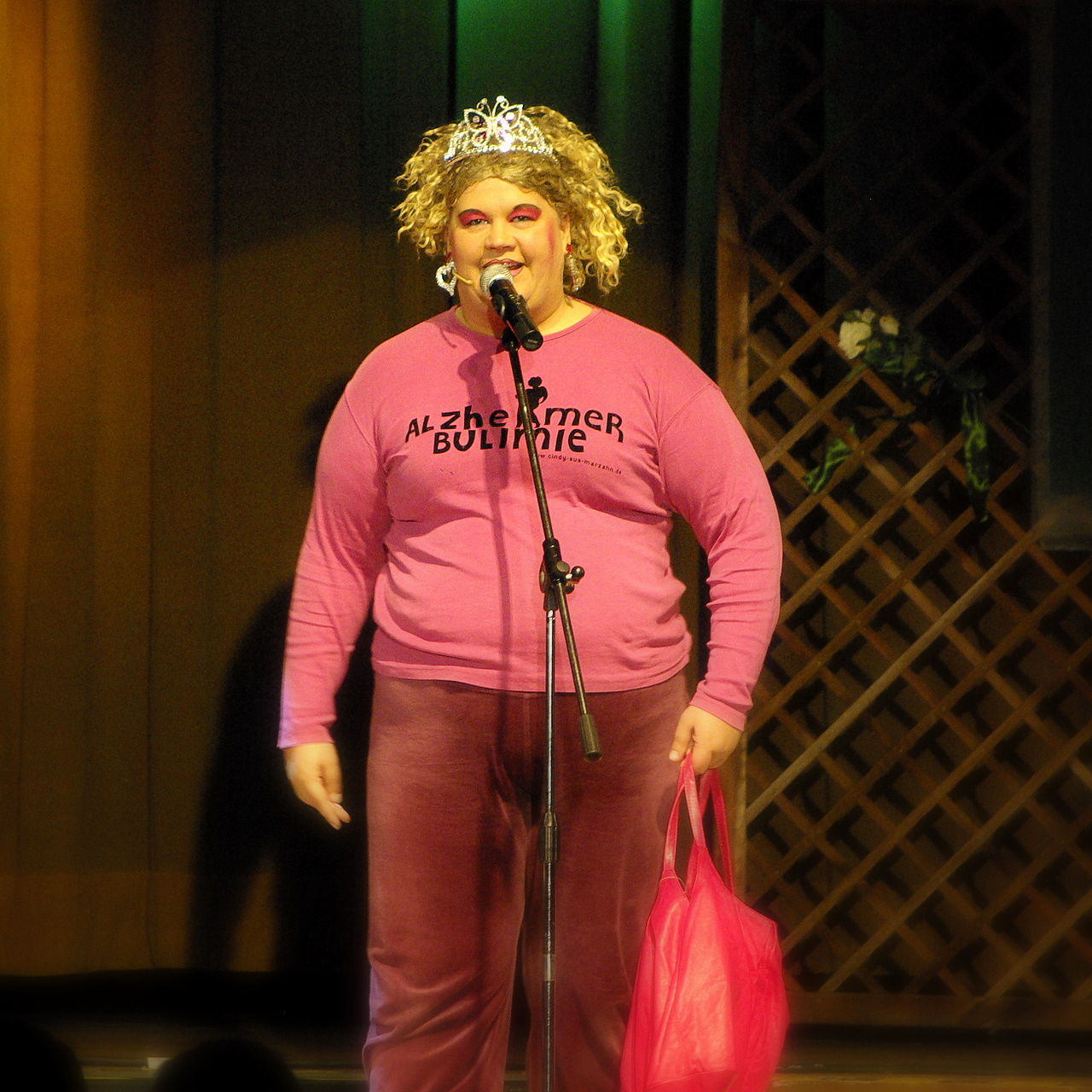
Bessin as Cindy aus Marzahn, 2008

Cindy aus Marzahn is a fictional character from the Berlin working class area Marzahn. Her character of a frumpy, sarcastic "Ossie" housewife has endeared her to millions of Germans, Swiss and Austrians, and she is one of the most famous and highly paid female entertainers and comedians in those countries. Her humorous observations about everyday life can be compared to Roseanne Barr of the USA, with more sweetness added. Cindy is most famous for her flaming pink velour track suit, and curly blond hair, with over-the-top makeup. Cindy's television comedy specials, usually taped in Halle (Saale), Germany, consistently attract strong audiences, and top guest stars and comedians from German comedy. Following the retirement of Thomas Gottschalk and Michelle Hunziker as presenters of the very famous German TV show "Wetten, dass..?", she assisted new presenter Markus Lanz as a co-host.

=== Tours ===
- 2007–2008: Schizophren – Ich wollte ’ne Prinzessin sein ("Schizophrenic - I Wanted to Be a Princess")
- 2009–2012: Nicht jeder Prinz kommt uff’m Pferd ("Not Every Prince Comes on a Horse")
- 2013–2014: PINK IS BJUTIFUL

== Awards ==
- 2007: German Comedy Award as Best Newcomer,
- 2009: German Comedy Award as Best Female Comedian,
- 2009: German Comedy Award as Best TV-Soloprogramm,
- 2010: German Comedy Award as Best Female Comedian,
- 2011: German Comedy Award as Best Female Comedian,
- 2012: Record for Schitzophrenics - "I Wanted to Be a Princess!" (Video-Comedy-Award)
- 2012: German Comedy Award as Best Female Comedian
