= Bülent Ceylan =

German comedian and Kabarett artist

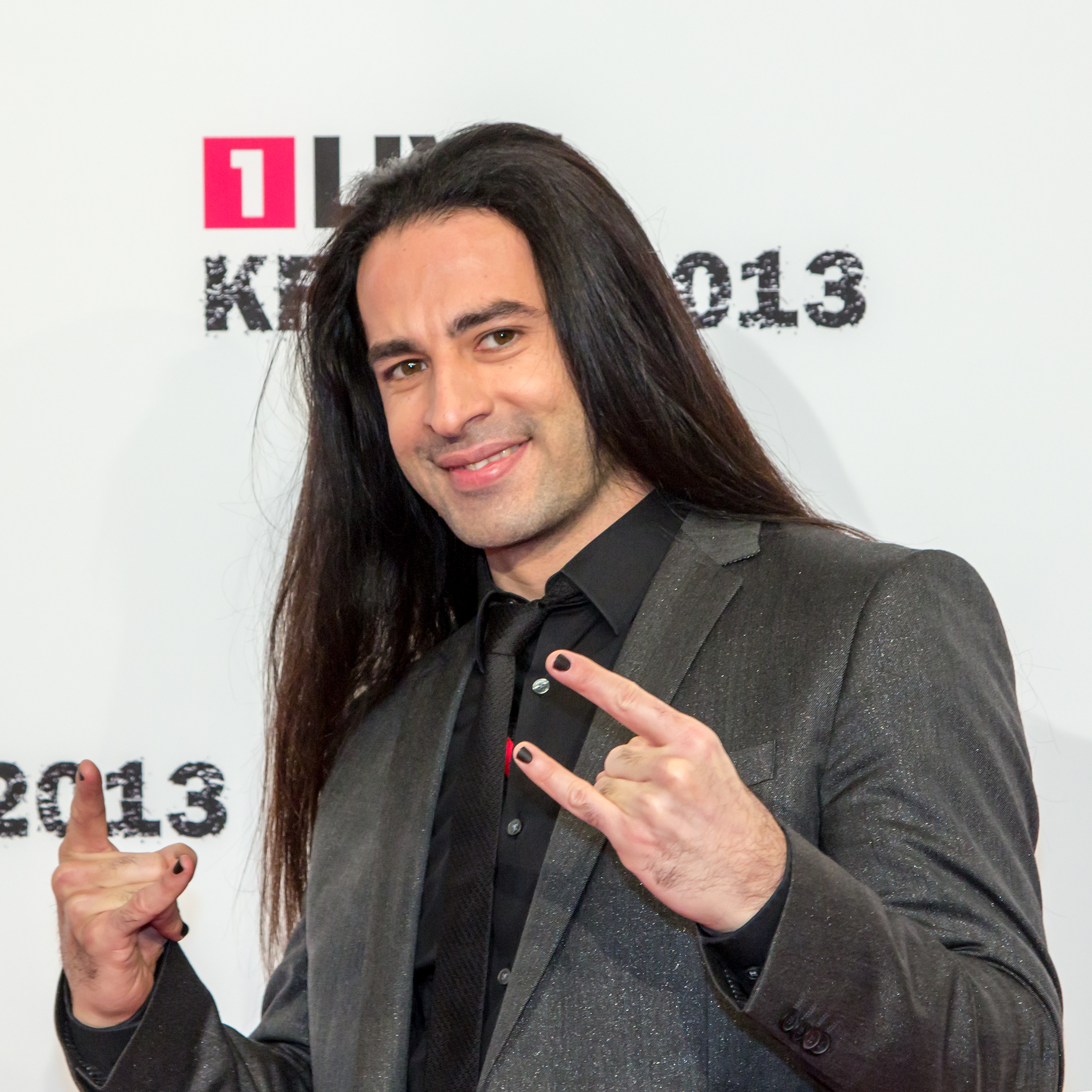
- Ceylan in 2013
- Born: 23 January 1976 (age 50); Mannheim, West Germany
- Occupation: Comedian
- Years active: 2002–present

Bülent Ceylan (born 4 January 1976) is a German comedian and Kabarett artist. He plays several comic roles with frequent themes being the quirks of Germans from Turkish family backgrounds and people from Mannheim, told in the dialect of Mannheim.

== Early life and education ==
Ceylan was born in Mannheim. His mother Hilde is a Hungarian-born German, his father Ahmet Ceylan (d. 2012) was a Turkish entrepreneur in the construction industry. He has three older siblings. He attended the Friedrich-Ebert elementary school and Ludwig-Frank-Gymnasium in Mannheim. In his eleventh year, he had a performance parodying Boris Becker, which was very well received by teachers and students.

After the Abitur in 1995, Ceylan did an internship with the German music channel VIVA and the radio station RPR1. In the beginning, he performed on small stages, afterwards he studied philosophy and political science but quit university in favor of his stage career.

== Career ==
In November 2002, Ceylan started the successful comedy program Döner for one (blend of Döner and Dinner for One), with which he achieved his national breakthrough.

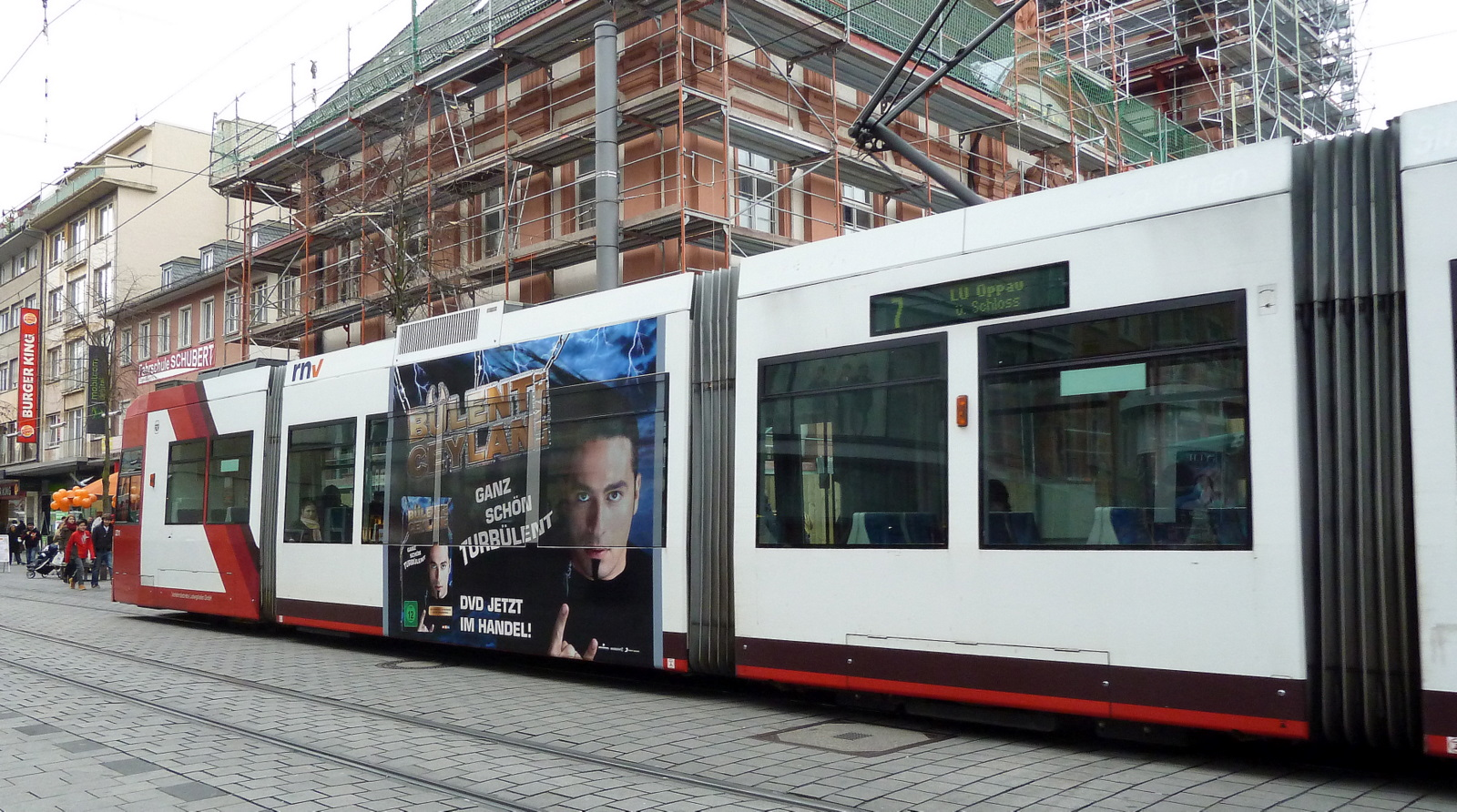
Advertisement for Ceylan's DVD Ganz schön turbülent on a Ludwigshafen tram

In July 2006, the premiere of his program Halb getürkt (wordplay: "getürkt" is colloquial for "faked", but Ceylan is also half Turkish) was broadcast on ZDF. In 2007, he followed up with Kebabbel net (blend of Kebab and "babbel net" meaning "Stop talking (crap)") which was later recorded and broadcast by RTL in 2009. This brought him the German Comedy Award in the category Newcomer and the CIVIS-Medienpreis for integration in May 2010. At the same time, Ceylan celebrated the premiere of his program Ganz schön turbülent (blend of "turbulent" and his name) for which he was awarded the German Comedy Award as best comedian in 2010.

Ceylan started his program Wilde Kreatürken (blend of "Kreaturen" = creatures and "Türken" = Turks) in 2011, which RTL broadcast in 2012. His next program Haardrock (blend of "Hard rock" and "Haar" = "hair", referring to his long hair) premiered in January 2014. In 2016, he started the program Kronk.

Ceylan has appeared in numerous German TV shows like Quatsch Comedy Club. He develops his programs mainly together with Roland Junghans. As an actor, he played Mustafa in several episodes of the series Hausmeister Krause, and Jonny, a main character in the sitcom Bewegte Männer. On 6 June 2008, he joined Stefan Raabs "Autoball" European championship, playing for Turkey. His stage show Bülent Ceylan – live was broadcast on RTL on Saturday, 26 September 2009. On 21 August 2010, Ceylan appeared at the Summer Breeze metal festival.

In February 2011, Die Bülent Ceylan Show started on RTL with the first season consisting of six episodes. In August 2011 he appeared at the Wacken Open Air metal festival.

== Personal life ==
Ceylan is married and has 4 kids. Ceylan has mentioned in several interviews that he has a foot fetish.

== Programs ==
- Döner for one – mit alles (start: November 2002, Capitol Mannheim)
- Halb getürkt (start: Oktober 2005, Rosengarten Mannheim)
- Kebabbel net (start: September 2007, Capitol Mannheim)
- Ganz schön turbülent! (start: Oktober 2009, Capitol Mannheim)
- Wilde Kreatürken (start: Oktober 2011, Capitol Mannheim)
- Kronk, 2016

=== DVDs ===
- Halb getürkt, Köln: WortArt, 2006
- Bülent Ceylan – live, Mannheim,(18 September 2009)
- Bülent Ceylan – Ganz schön turbülent (22 October 2010)

=== Audio CDs ===
- Produzier' mich net!, 2000
- Döner for one, Berlin: Blue Cat Print und Music, 2003
- Halb getürkt, Köln: WortArt, 2006
- Kebabbel net, 2008
- Ganz schön Turbülent, 2010

== Awards ==
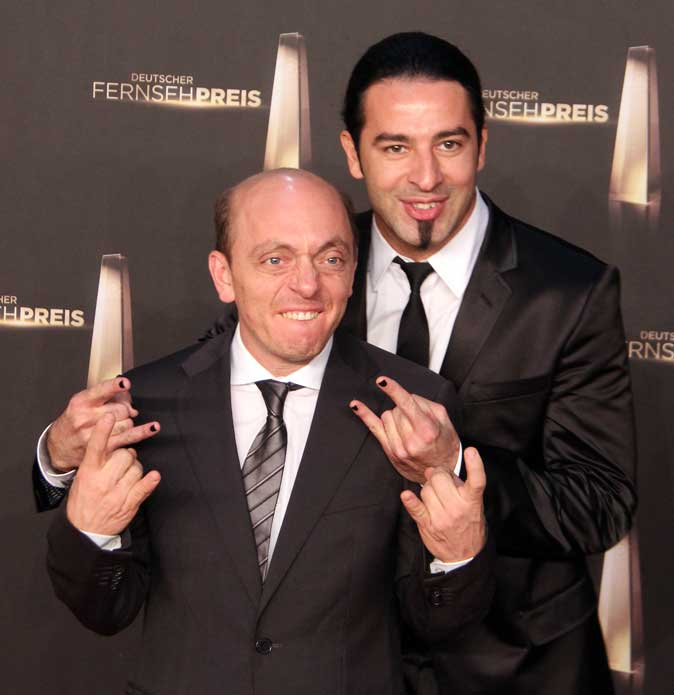
Ceylan (right) and Bernhard Hoëcker at the 2012 German Television Awards

- 2001 Bielefelder Kabarettpreis
- 2002 Kleinkunstpreis Baden-Württemberg
- 2009 German Comedy Award: Best Newcomer
- 2010 CIVIS-Medienpreis
- 2011 Goldene Schallplatte for the DVD Bülent Ceylan - Live!
- 2011 Goldene Schallplatte for the DVD Ganz schön turbülent
- 2011 German Comedy Award: Best Comedian
