= Kaya Yanar =

German comedian

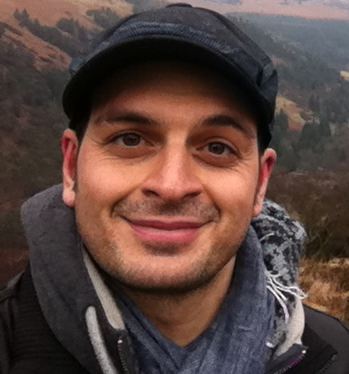
- Born: 20 May 1973 (age 53); Frankfurt am Main, West Germany
- Occupation: Comedian
- Years active: 2001–present
- Known for: Was guckst du?!

Kaya Yanar (born 20 May 1973) is a German comedian, best known for his comedy show Was guckst du?! (Whatcha lookin' at?!).

== Early life ==
Yanar was born in Frankfurt am Main, West Germany, to Turkish immigrants from Antakya. While at school, he once told his teacher that he wanted to be a comedian, which made the teacher laugh. In an interview with German talkshow host Johannes B. Kerner, Yanar described his childhood as a more liberal one and stated that despite his Turkish nationality, he cannot speak the Turkish language. After graduating from Heinrich-von-Gagern-Gymnasium (a school in Frankfurt), he studied phonetics, American studies and philosophy but left university prior to graduation.

== Career ==
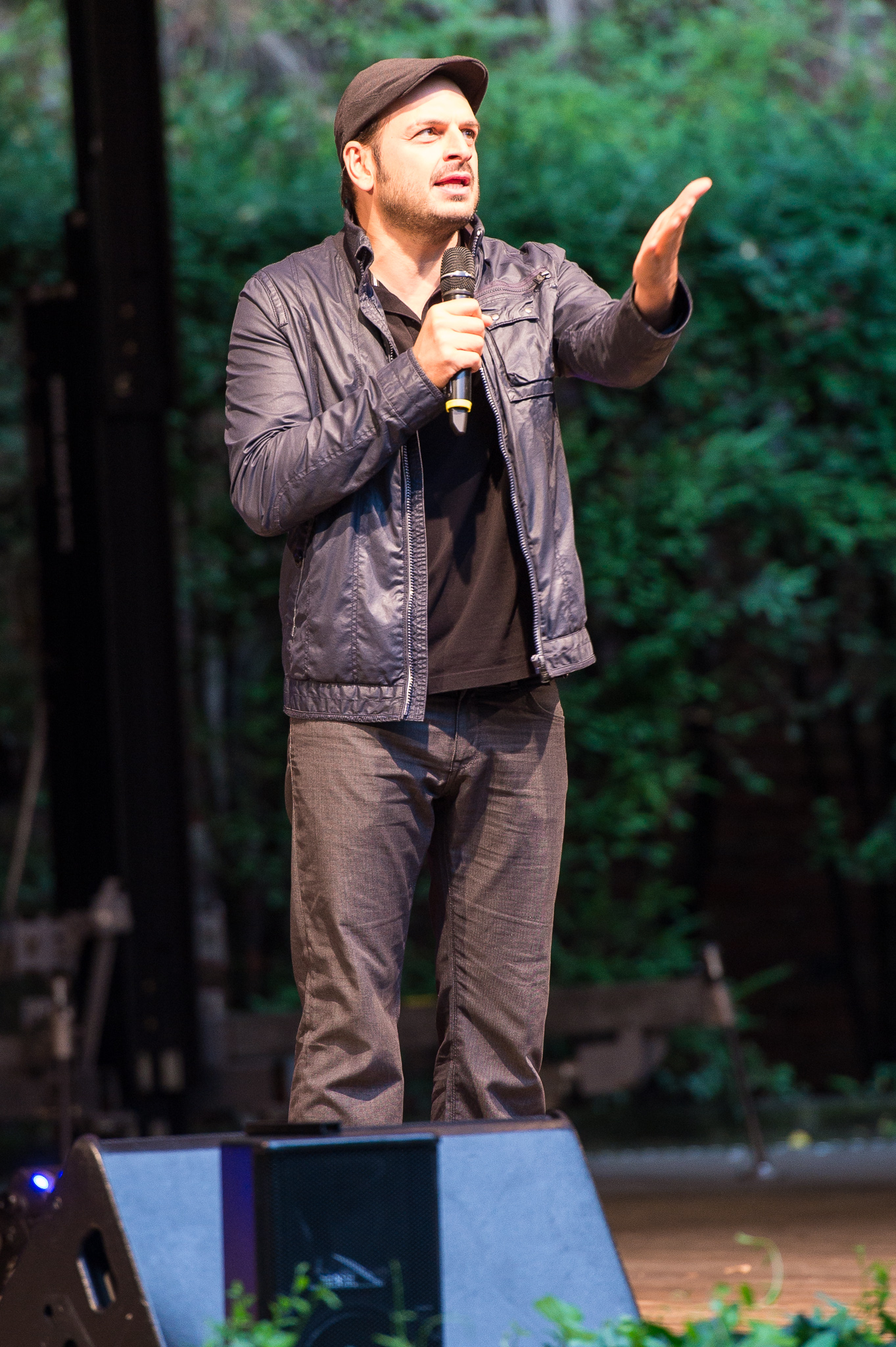
Yanar in 2015

In his one-man comedy show Was guckst du?!, Yanar toys with well-known cultural stereotypes both as host and main performer. For one of his best known sketches about an East Indian, Ranjid and his pet cow (and substitute best friend) Benita, he practiced pidgin-English for months, which he learned from some Indian friends of his from university. He also parodies the stereotypical way Turkish migrants use to speak.

Furthermore, he toured through Germany with solo programmes. Fixations of his programmes "Made in Germany" (2008), "Live und unzensiert" (2009) and "All Inclusive!" (2013) were broadcast by German TV station RTL.

He also presented the ZDF show "Kaya Yanar testet Deutschland – die Multi-Kulti-Show (2007)" as part of a theme week focusing on integration. Because of his great success being without precedent for an artist with Turkish migration background in the German-speaking countries at the time of his appearance, Yanar is considered as a key figure and trailblazer for the acceptance of multicultural issues.

Since December 2012, Yanar is godfather of the "Heinrich-Middendorf-Oberschule Aschendorf" in the project "Schule ohne Rassismus – Schule mit Courage" ("School without racism – school with courage").

In 2014, RTL started broadcasting his show "Geht's noch?! Kayas Woche", a weekly current affairs programme with a mixture of stand-up comedy and political satire.

Yanar is also a member of the jury in the German "Comedy Grand-Prix", an annual comedy contest which is broadcast on TV to seek the "best German comedian".

== Personal life ==
Kaya is a vegan (formerly pescetarian); he is an animal rights activist and supports PETA.

== Selected filmography ==
- 2004: Was guckst du?! – Season 1–4
- 2008: Made in Germany Live
- 2008: Dekker & Adi – Wer bremst verliert!
- 2008: Was guckst du?! – Season 5–8
- 2009: Live und unzensiert
- 2009–2011: Schillerstraße
- since 2011: Stars bei der Arbeit (with Dieter Tappert as Paul Panzer)
- 2012: Die Kaya Show (Actor and Host)
- 2012: Agent Ranjid rettet die Welt
- 2013: Typisch Deutsch
- 2014: Geht's noch?! Kayas Woche

== Discography ==
=== CDs ===
- 2001: Suchst du
- 2003: Welttournee durch Deutschland
- 2008: Made in Germany Live (DE #32)

=== DVDs ===
- 2004: Was guckst du?! – Best of Staffel 1–4
- 2008: Made in Germany Live
- 2008: Was guckst du?! – Best of Staffel 5–8
- 2009: Live und unzensiert
- 2011: Kaya Yanar & Paul Panzer Stars bei der Arbeit
- 2015: Around the world

=== Books ===
- 2011: Made in Germany beim Heyne Verlag, ISBN 978-3-453-60204-5

== Awards ==
- 2001: Deutscher Fernsehpreis Beste Comedy for Was guckst du?!
- 2001: Deutscher Comedypreis Beste Comedysendung for Was guckst du?!
- 2001: Romy (TV award) Beste Programmidee for Was guckst du?!
- 2001: Civis media prize
- 2005: Grüne Palme for outstanding contribution to international understanding (für besondere Verdienste um die Völkerverständigung)
- 2009: Golden record for the DVD Made in Germany-Live
- 2012: Radio Regenbogen Comedy-Award
- 2013: Deutscher Comedypreis Bestes TV-Soloprogramm for Kaya live! All inclusive
- 2014: Deutscher Comedypreis Bester Komiker
