= Mario Barth =

German comedian (born 1972)

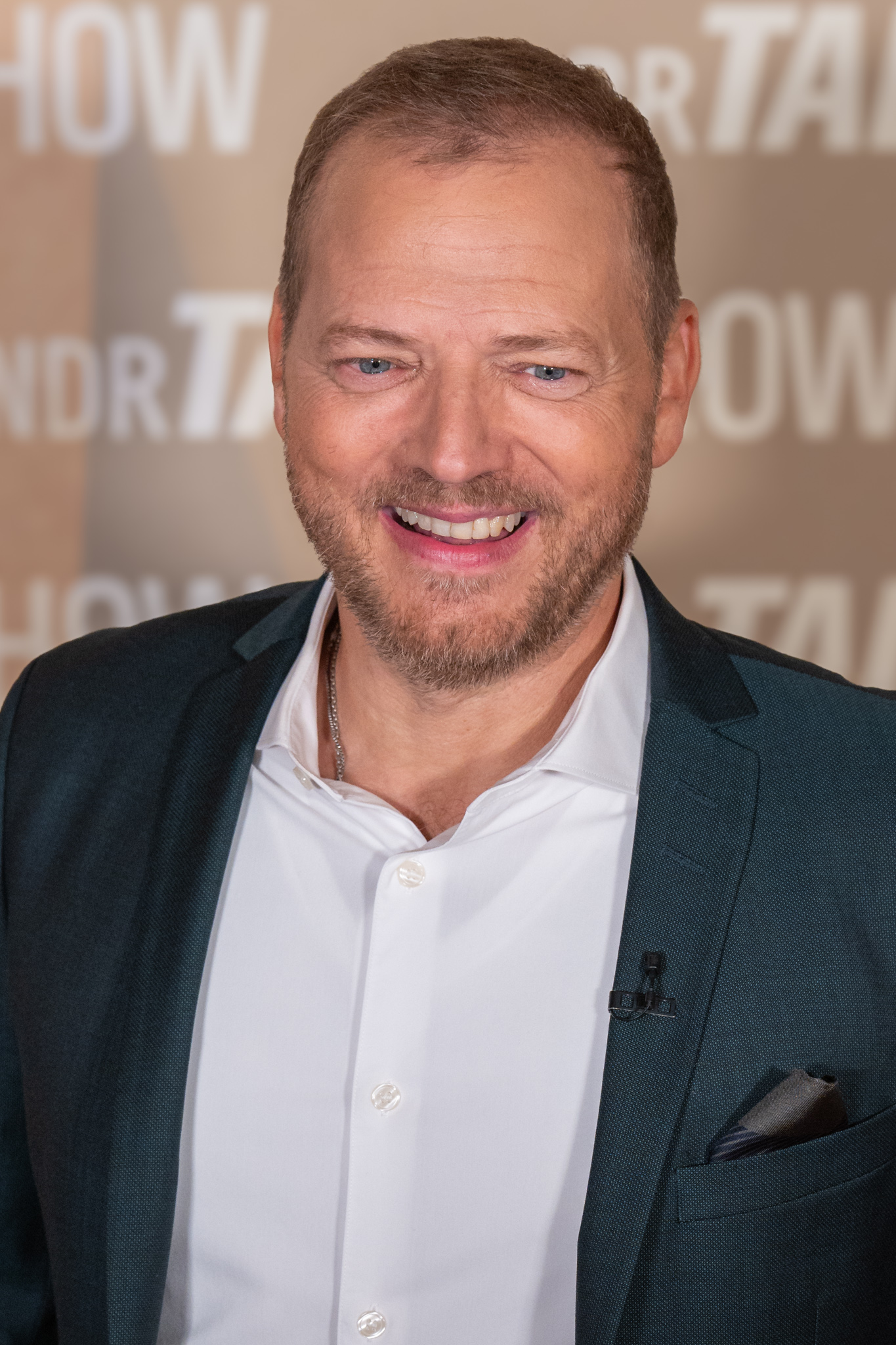
- Barth in 2023
- Born: Mario Wolfgang Barth; 1 November 1972 (age 54); West Berlin-Mariendorf, West Germany
- Occupation: Comedian
- Years active: 2001–present
- Website: mariobarth.de

Mario Wolfgang Barth (born 1 November 1972) is a German comedian who mainly deals with the interactions between men and women.

== Early life ==
Barth was one out of six children born to a family in Berlin-Mariendorf. Raised Catholic, he served as an altar boy in his youth, and his parents sent him to a private Catholic school. He completed an apprenticeship as a telecommunications electrician at Siemens in Berlin. In 1995, he started studying to become an actor.

== Career ==
During several comedy-workshops, such as the Comedy School in Cologne, he met other actors and comedians, including Diether Krebs, Anka Zink, and Thomas Hermanns. He gained experience by performing on TV shows such as NightWash and Quatsch Comedy Club. Since the beginning of 2001, he has been on the road with his stage show Männer sind Schweine, Frauen aber auch! ("Men are pigs, but women are too"). In 2003, Barth had his comedy breakthrough with the show. In the same year, he developed his own comedy-question program called Keine Ahnung? ("No Clue"), with its second season broadcast in 2005.

In 2004, Barth published a "dictionary for men to understand women" called Deutsch-Frau, Frau-Deutsch. It sold out within the first days of its publication, and so far 2 million dictionaries have been sold. The dictionary was also sold internationally in various countries such as South Korea, the Netherlands, the Czech Republic, Japan, and Poland. Barth has been an occasional guest in the comedy show Schillerstraße, where his roles included, among other things, a heating engineer, an exterminator, a master potter, and a funeral director. He also took part in the RTL show Typisch Frau – Typisch Mann from its inception.

On 28 October 2005, his live DVD Männer sind Schweine, Frauen aber auch! was published after being recorded on 24 and 25 June in Berlin. The DVD reached the number 3 position on the German Album Charts, and has reached platinum status for selling over two million times.

The following year, on 16 February, Barth started his new program, Männer sind primitiv, aber glücklich! ("Men are primitive, but happy!"), which received the German Comedy Award in the category "best live comedy", in October 2006. On 1 and 8 December 2006, RTL broadcast the program Mario sucht das Paradies aus, where Barth travelled around Dubai, as a cowboy in Texas, as a fireman in Dallas, as a pilot (à la Top Gun), as well as in Hollywood with Ralf Moeller. Beginning on 30 November 2007, RTL has shown the ten-part new entertainment program Mario Barth präsentiert.

On 12 July 2008, Barth established a new world record in the category, "live comedy with the largest audience", as he performed in front of 70,000 people at Olympic Stadium in Berlin, breaking the previous record of 15,900 comedy visitors held by American comedian Chris Rock at a show in London. With this performance Barth also published his single "Mensch Berlin", which he recorded with Paul Kuhn. In September 2008, the DVD Die Weltrekord-Show: Männer sind primitiv aber glücklich! was published, which included the whole performance at Olympic Stadium. Barth was selected out of 100 candidates as the "most embarrassing man" of Berlin by the Berlin journal Tip at the end of 2008.

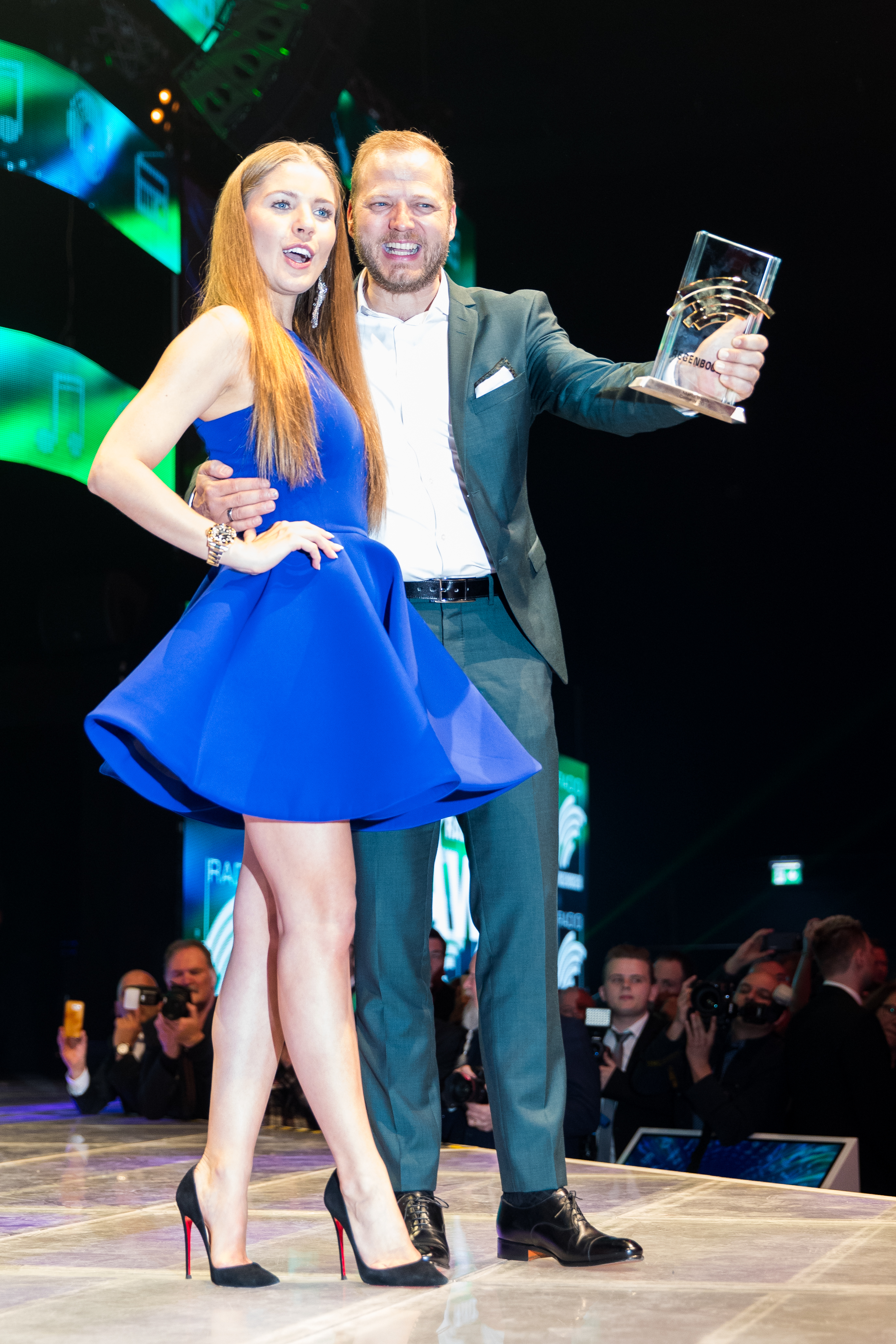
Barth and Victoria Swarovski at the Radio Regenbogen Awards 2017

In 2009, Barth produced his own first movie, the comedy Männersache, where he elaborated on the relationship between men and women, similar to his comedy routines. The audio book Männersache came out in April of the same year. On 2 May 2009, he started up his new stage program Männer sind peinlich, Frauen manchmal auch!. In September 2009 the matching live CD was released. Since 2009, he has hosted the comedy show Willkommen bei Mario Barth on RTL.

In December 2010, Barth registered the quotation "Nichts reimt sich auf Uschi" ("nothing rhymes with Uschi") as a protected expression, although the quotation was used by Oliver Kalkofe and Dietmar Wischmeyer, as presenters of the show Frühstyxradio at Radio FFN. A T-shirt producer who had printed this quote on T-shirts was officially warned by Barth's attorneys to desist using the quote, with a claim value of €100,000. Barth lives in both Berlin and Düsseldorf, where his entertainment company is located.

In 2014, Barth established a new world record: He managed to increase the record he had set in 2008 as the German comedian in the category "live comedy with the largest audience" with an audience of 116,498. Guinness World Records judge Eva Norris had observed the world record attempt. This is Barth's third world record; apart from the two audience records, he also holds the world record for the longest DVD ending which lasted 40 minutes and 38 seconds and which can be found on Barth's DVD Mario Barth: Die Weltrekord-Show.
