= Carolin Kebekus =

German comedian

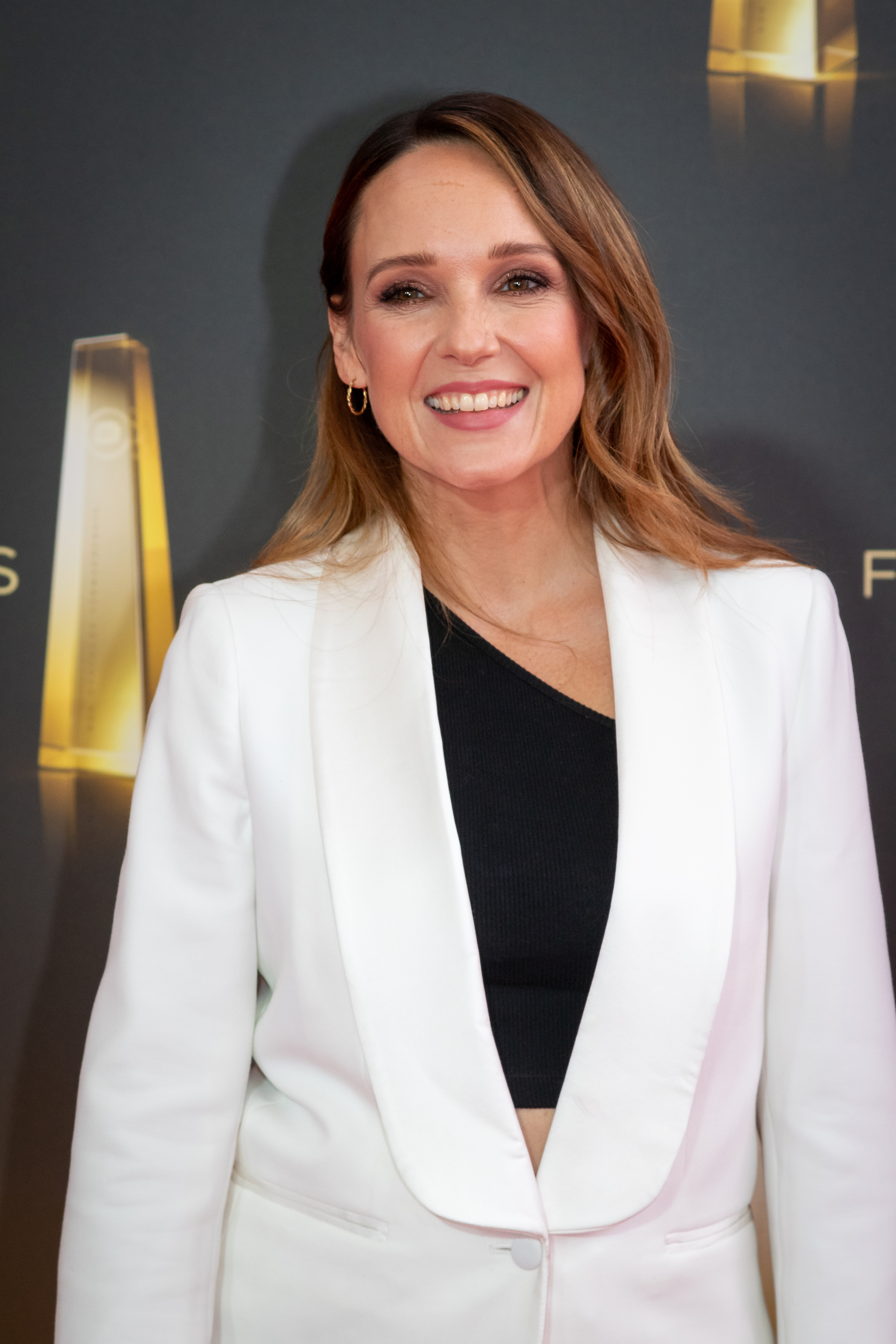
- Kebekus in 2021
- Born: 9 May 1980 (age 45); Bergisch Gladbach, West Germany
- Occupation: Comedian
- Website: carolinkebekus.de

Carolin Kebekus (born 9 May 1980) is a German comedian and television personality. The content of her comedy is highly feminist and satirical.

== Biography ==
Born in Bergisch Gladbach, Kebekus grew up as daughter of a social education worker and a banker in Köln-Ostheim. Her younger brother David Kebekus is also a comedian. She started her career as an intern at Freitag Nacht News, a weekly comedy show. One of the co-producers of the show, Hugo Egon Balder, saw her talent in acting and arranged for her to take acting classes parallel to her internship. In 2002, she did an internship at 1 Live.

Her parodies of the lead singer Bill Kaulitz of the band Tokio Hotel in the Freitag Nacht News were the catalysts of her breakthrough. However, in 2006 she also faced big backlash from the fan-community of Tokio Hotel and received hateful messages and threats. From September 2006 until the show was canceled in December 2006, Kebekus was one of the hosts of Freitag Nacht News together with Ingo Appelt and others.

In an interview with the Kölner Stadt-Anzeiger on 9 March 2022, Kebekus said that she had left the Roman Catholic Church, but continued to consider herself Catholic. "As a baptized person, no-one can take that away from me or deny it. I have problems with the institution, its structures and balance of power. That's why I left the Church. But I feel that I belong to the community of believers."

== Filmography ==
- 2005: Schillerstraße
- 2006: Freitag Nacht News
- 2006: Pastewka - Der Gutschein
- 2007: Vollidiot
- 2007: Kinder, Kinder
- 2007: Sag es mit Pantoffeln
- 2008: Instructor Schmidt
- 2008: Die einzig wahren Hochzeitscrasher
- 2008: WunderBar
- 2009-2011: Broken Comedy
- 2011: Die Wochenshow
- 2012: Hanni & Nanni 2
- 2012: Agent Ranjid rettet die Welt
- 2012: Die ProSieben Märchenstunde
- 2013: Knight Rusty
- 2013: TV total Prunksitzung
- since 2013: heute-show
- 2013: Kebekus!
- 2013: Durchgedreht!
- 2013: Eye TV - Der durchgeknallte Puppensender
- 2014: Therapy Crashers
- 2014: Mario Barth deckt auf!
- 2015-2019: PussyTerror TV
- 2020: Die Carolin Kebekus Show
- 2021: LOL: Last One Laughing

== Awards ==
- 2013: Deutscher Comedypreis as Best Comedian
- 2014: Deutscher Comedypreis as Best Comedian
