= Markus Maria Profitlich =

German comedian and actor (born 1960)

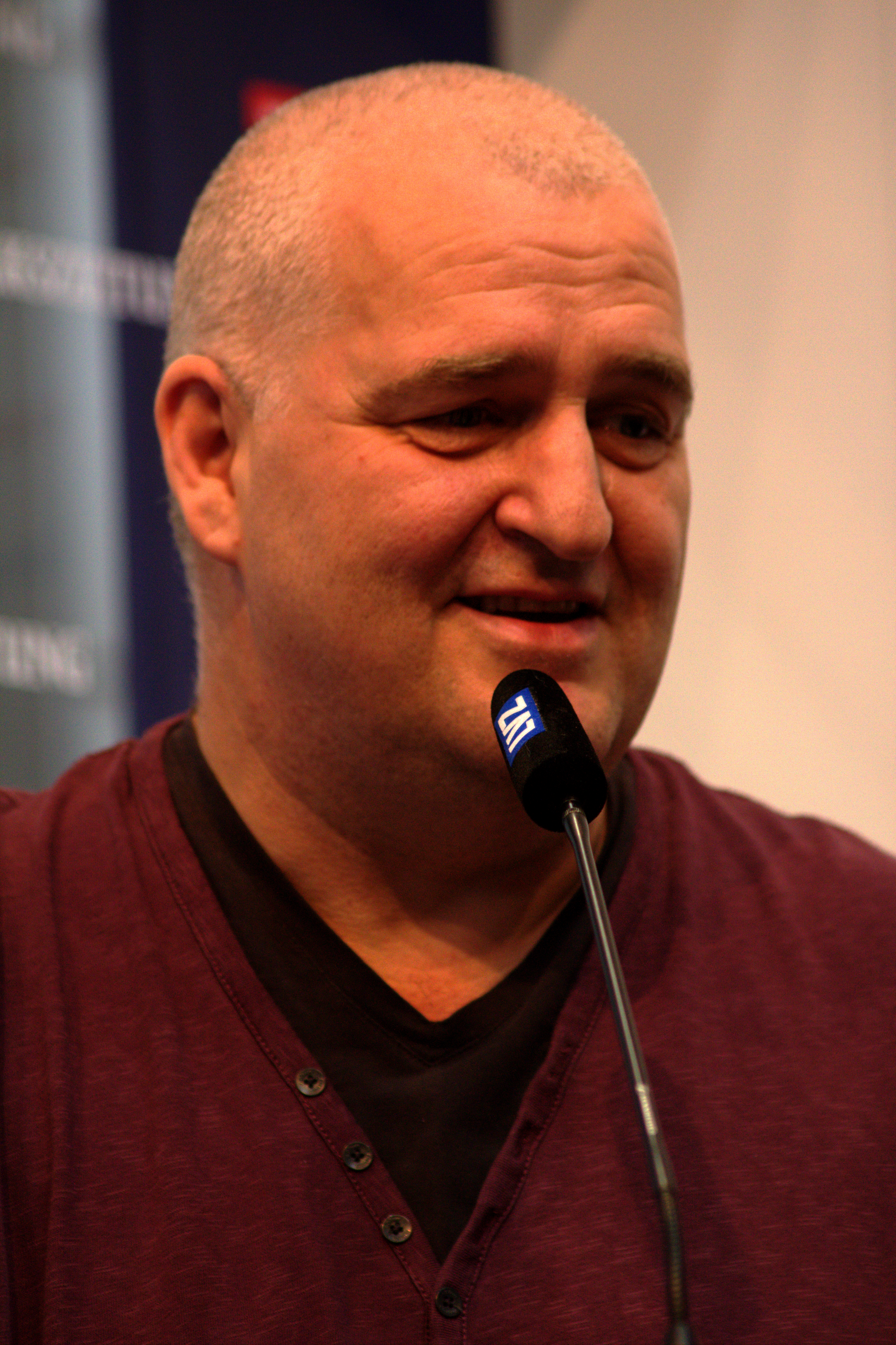
Profitlich in 2012

Markus Maria Profitlich (born 25 March 1960 in Bonn) is a German comedian, actor and voice actor who was a cast member of Die Wochenshow between 1999 and 2001. He also hosted his own show, Mensch Markus, from 2002 to 2007.

== Biography ==
Profitlich's most famous role on Die Wochenshow was the "Erklärbär" (Explaining Bear). Other roles included the shy reporter Peter Wuttke, Mawegda Gandhi and Baby Markus.

Furthermore, Profitlich is the producer of the programme Weibsbilder, as well as Deutschland ist schön (Germany is nice). The name Profitlich is not a stage name, but is probably derived from "a person who acts profitably" (source: Udolph, Jürgen: Professor Udolphs Buch der Namen, Munich, 2005, P. 78-81). Profitlich also voiced Bob Parr / Mr. Incredible in the German dub of the Pixar films The Incredibles and Incredibles 2.

Profitlich is married to actress Ingrid Einfeldt, his stage partner in Mensch Markus. His daughter was born in the beginning of 2005.

Profitlich is member of the Social Democratic Party of Germany and a confessing Christian. In his youth, he visited the YMCA in Siegburg (near Bonn), where he led Christian holiday courses for children. He is now member of a free Protestant parish.

== Audiobooks ==
- 2007: Adrian Plass: Tagebuch eines frommen Chaoten, publisher: Brendow, ISBN 978-3-8650-6142-3
- 2018: Die Unglaublichen (The Incredibles, novelization), publisher: der Hörverlag, ISBN 978-3-8445-3049-0
- 2018: Die Unglaublichen 2 (Incredibles 2, novelization), publisher: der Hörverlag, ISBN 978-3-8445-3050-6

== Awards ==
- 2002 German Comedy Awards: Best Comedian for Mensch Markus
- 2004 German Comedy Awards: Best Sketch Show for Mensch Markus
- 2006 German Comedy Awards: Best Sketch Comedy for Mensch Markus
