= Olaf Schubert =

German comedian and musician

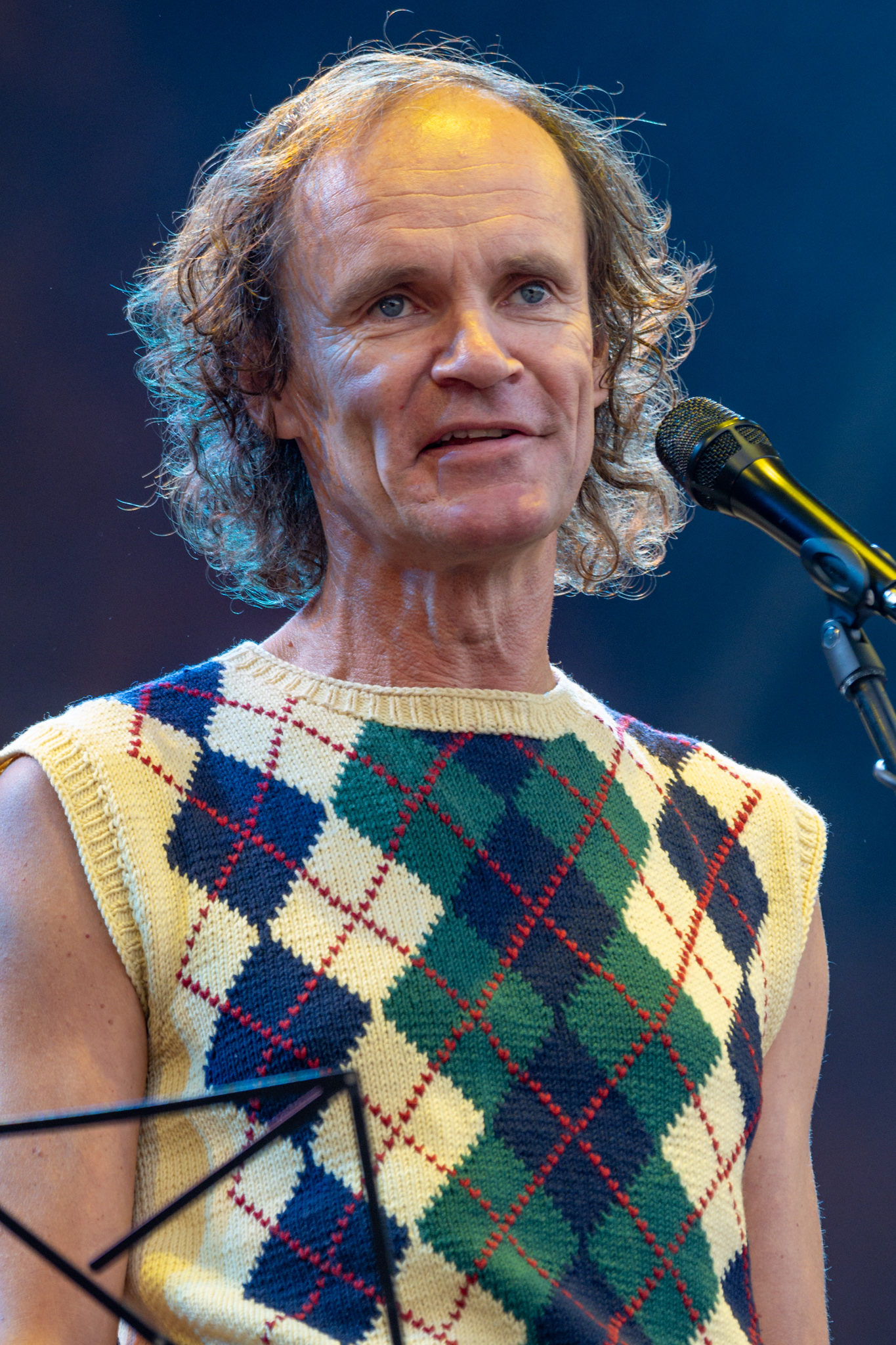
- Schubert in 2021
- Born: 7 November 1967 (age 58); Plauen, Saxony, East Germany
- Other name: Michael Haubold
- Occupations: Comedian; Musician
- Website: http://www.olaf-schubert.de/

Michael Haubold (born November 7, 1967), better known by his stage name Olaf Schubert is a German comedian and musician.

== Life ==
Schubert works as comedian and musician on German broadcasters and radios.

== Discography by Olaf Schubert ==
- Bestandsaufnahme – Songs after Die Wende (1991)
- Hier bin ich! (1995)
- Gefühl gewinnt! (1996)
- Ich bereue nichts! (1998)
- Bestandsaufnahme (1999)
- Echte Menschen (2000)
- Boykott (DVD, 2003)
- Ich bin bei dir (2007)
- Ich bin bei euch (DVD, 2009)
- Meine Kämpfe (CD, 2009)
- Meine Kämpfe (DVD, 2012)
- So! (CD, 2013)
- So! (DVD, 2014)

=== Hörspiele ===
- Die 17 besten Hördialoge (1998)
- In Verbalgewittern (2002)
- Meisterwerke selbstgemacht (2005)
- Olaf Schubert packt ein (2008)
- Komplette Fragmente (2009)

=== Gabi Schubert ===
& die Original Elbtaler

- Ich bin wieder da (2001)

== Comedy Awards ==
- 2004 Salzburger Stier
- 2004 St. Ingberter Pfanne
- 2005 Thüringer Kleinkunstpreis
- 2006 Das große Kleinkunstfestival – Berlin-Award
- 2008 Deutscher Comedypreis in category Best newcomer
- 2009 Deutscher Comedypreis as member of heute-show (Best comedyshow)
- 2010 Deutscher Fernsehpreis as member of heute-show (Comedy)
- 2010 Deutscher Kleinkunstpreis
- 2010 Deutscher Comedypreis as member of heute-show (Best comedyshow)
- 2011 Deutscher Comedypreis as member of heute-show (Best comedyshow)
- 2012 Deutscher Comedypreis as member of heute-show (Best comedyshow)
- 2013 Deutscher Comedypreis in category Best comedian
- 2014 Deutscher Fernsehpreis as member of heute-show (Comedy)
- 2014 Bambi as member of heute-show (Comedy)
