= Bewegte Männer =

- Genre: sitcom, comedy
- Starring: Michael Härle: Axel Feldheim; Oliver Muth: Norbert Brommer; Carolina Vera: Dorothea Zöllner; Ingo Naujoks: Frank Hilsmann; Victor Schefé: Walter „Waltraud“ Gutbrod; Ingrid van Bergen: Margarethe Brommer; Ninon Held: Rebecca; Saskia de Lando: Trixi Schreiber; Ingolf Lück: Paul; Bülent Ceylan: Jonny
- Country of origin: Germany
- No. of episodes: 39

Production
- Running time: 25 minutes

Original release
- Network: Sat. 1
- Release: 28 February 2003

Bewegte Männer (Moving Men) is a German sitcom television series, based on the comic by Ralf König. 39 episodes were aired on Sat. 1 between 2003 and 2005.

== See also ==
- List of German television series
