= Anke =

Anke is a female given name. It may refer to the following:

- Anke Baier-Loef (born 1972), German speed skater
- Anke Behmer, née Vater (born 1961), former East German athlete
- Anke Borchmann (born 1954), German rower
- Anke Brockmann (born 1988), German field hockey player
- Anke Dannowski, German mountain bike orienteering competitor
- Anke Domscheit-Berg (born 1968), German politician who was a member of the Bundestag
- Anke Ehrhardt, researcher into sexual and gender development of children, adolescents, and adults
- Anke Engelke (born 1965), German comedian, actress and voice-over actress born in Montréal, Quebec, Canada
- Anke Feller (born 1971), retired German sprinter who specializes in the 400 metres
- Anke Fuchs (born 1937), German lawyer and politician of the Social Democratic Party of Germany
- Anke-Eve Goldmann (born 1930), German former motorcycle journalist
- Anke Huber (born 1974), German retired professional tennis player
- Anke Kühne née Kühn (born 1981), female field hockey player from Germany
- Anke Eißmann (born 1977), German illustrator and graphic designer known for her illustrations of Tolkien's work
- Anke Möhring (born 1969), former freestyle swimmer and Olympic medallist from East Germany
- Anke Nothnagel (born 1966), East German-German sprint canoeist
- Anke Ohde, East German sprint canoeist who competed in the mid-1970s
- Anke Pietrangeli (born 1982), South African singer, winner of Idols in South Africa in 2003
- Anke Reschwam Schulze (born 1972), German cross country skier
- Anke Rijnders (born 1956), former butterfly and freestyle swimmer from the Netherlands
- Anke Scholz (born 1978), retired female swimmer from Germany
- Anke Spoorendonk (born 1947), Danish-German politician
- Anke Van dermeersch (born 1972), Flemish politician and former beauty queen
- Anke Vondung (born 1972), German mezzo-soprano
- Anke Westendorf (born 1954), German former volleyball player
- Anke Wild (born 1967), former field hockey player from Germany
- Anke Wirsing (born 1980), German politician
- Anke Wischnewski (born 1978), German luger who has competed since 2001

== See also ==
- Hannelore Anke (born 1957), German swimmer who competed for East Germany in the 1970s
- Anke (TV series), a German television series starring Anke Engelke
- Aunk (originally Anke), hamlet in East Devon, England
- Ankh, an ancient hieroglyph
