= Cordula Stratmann =

German comedian (born 1963)

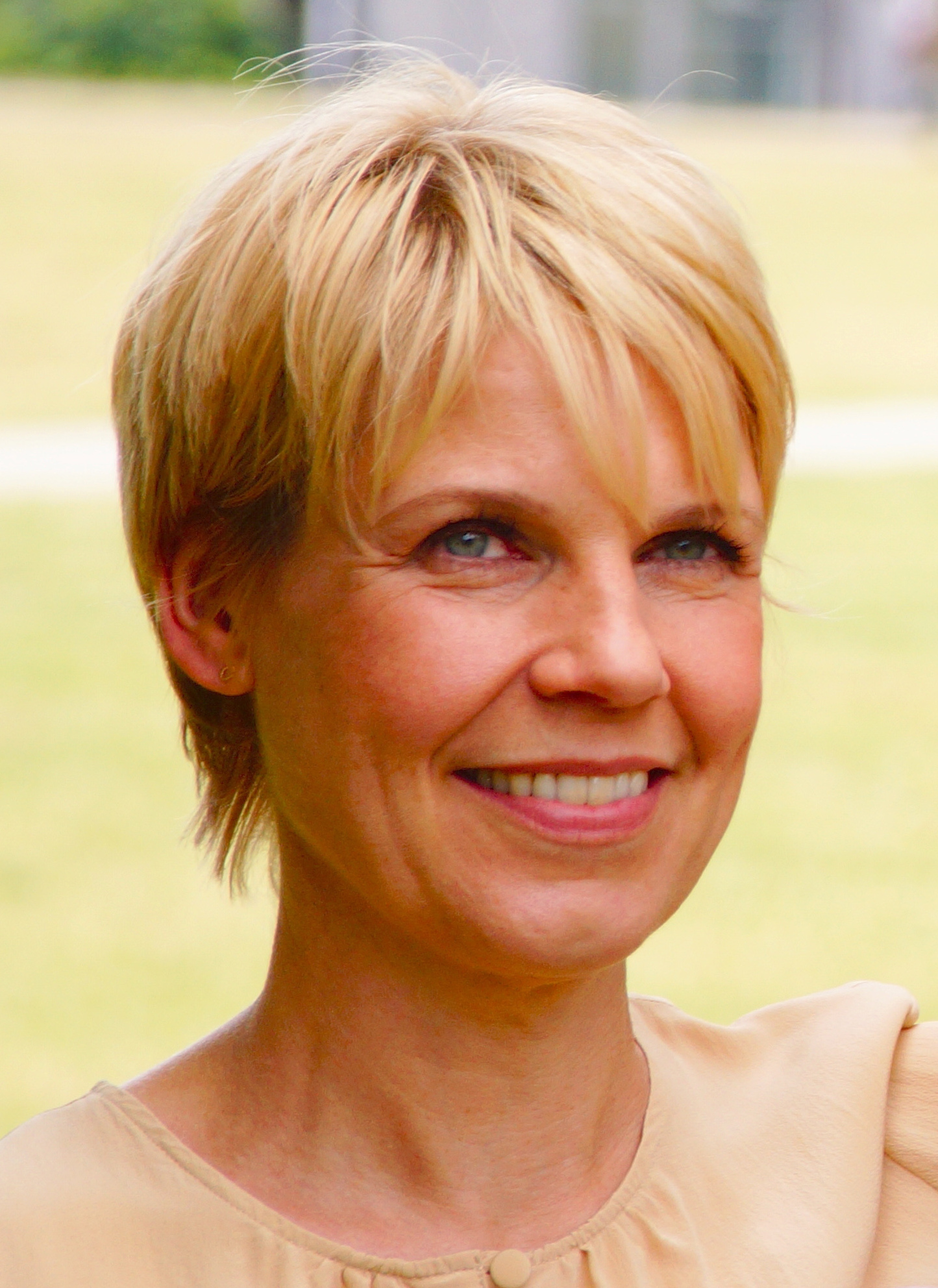
- Stratmann in 2015
- Born: 1963; Düsseldorf, West Germany
- Occupation(s): Comedian, actress

Cordula Stratmann born in 1963 is a German comedian and actress.

== Life ==
After taking the Abitur school-leaving examination, Stratmann studied social work at the Catholic University of Applied Sciences in North Rhine-Westphalia, in Cologne. During her work at the family counselling section of the Pulheim youth welfare office she also trained as a family therapist. For the carnival season in 1992, she invented the character "Annemie Hülchrath".

Stratmann had her first television appearances as the host of the comedy shows Manngold and Sonst gerne on tm3 and on ZDF. In 1998, she acted in Zimmer frei! as "Annemie Hülchrath". In 2001, her first stage programme Andererseits wiederum … followed. In the years 2002 to 2004, she had a show called Annemie Hülchrath – Der Talk on WDR, and in September 2004 she started an improvisation comedy show Schillerstraße.

In October 2001, Stratmann was nominated for the German Comedy Award as "Beste Komikerin" (best comedian). In October 2002 another nomination followed, and in 2005 she finally won the award for "Schillerstraße", as "Beste Impro-Comedy" (best improvisational comedy show).

In November 2005, her management confirmed the rumor that she was pregnant. To hide her pregnancy, her Schillerstraße character became very "fat" by means of a fatsuit and finally had to go to a diet camp. On 31 March 2006, she gave birth to a son, Emil, from her marriage with Rainer Osnowski.

== Awards ==
- German Comedy Award 2005: Beste Komikerin (Best Comedian)
- German Comedy Award 2005: Beste Impro-Comedy (Best Improvisational Comedy Show)
- German Television Award 2005: Beste Comedy (Best Comedy Show)
- Goldene Kamera 2007: Comedy

== See also ==
- German television comedy
- List of German comedians
