= Comedystreet =

German entertainment show

- Genre: Comedy series, hidden camera
- Starring: Simon Gosejohann
- Opening theme: Fehlfarben: Ein Jahr (Es Geht Voran)
- Country of origin: Germany
- Original language: German
- No. of seasons: 2+
- No. of episodes: 57+

Production
- Running time: 22 minutes (XXL-Version: 44 minutes)
- Production company: Prime Productions GmbH

Original release
- Network: ProSieben
- Release: September 2, 2002

Comedystreet is a German entertainment show created by and starring comedian Simon Gosejohann. The show follows a hidden camera format. Gosejohann takes different roles with the intent of shocking passersby. Many sketches are filmed in North Rhine-Westphalia, especially in the Ruhr area and the cities of Dortmund and Essen. The show is sometimes filmed in Rhine-Ruhr in cities such as Düsseldorf. Other common locations are the islands of Sylt and Norderney. Some skits are also shot in foreign cities such as Paris and Prague. Gosejohann is recorded by a hidden camera, in a similar vein to British comedy series Trigger Happy TV and World Shut Your Mouth by Dom Joly. Simon's brother Thilo is responsible for the filming.

Comedystreet premiered on 2 September 2002 on German TV station ProSieben. Due to the show's ratings, a fifth season was confirmed. In October 2010, the show entered syndication on Comedy Central.

The crew consists of the two brothers and a director. The director manages the legal issues and obtains the broadcast licenses and the procedures. All passersby are informed and asked for written permission before their segment is included.

== Awards ==
- 2009: Deutscher Comedypreis – Best Candid camera show
