= Martina Hill =

German actress and comedian (born 1974)

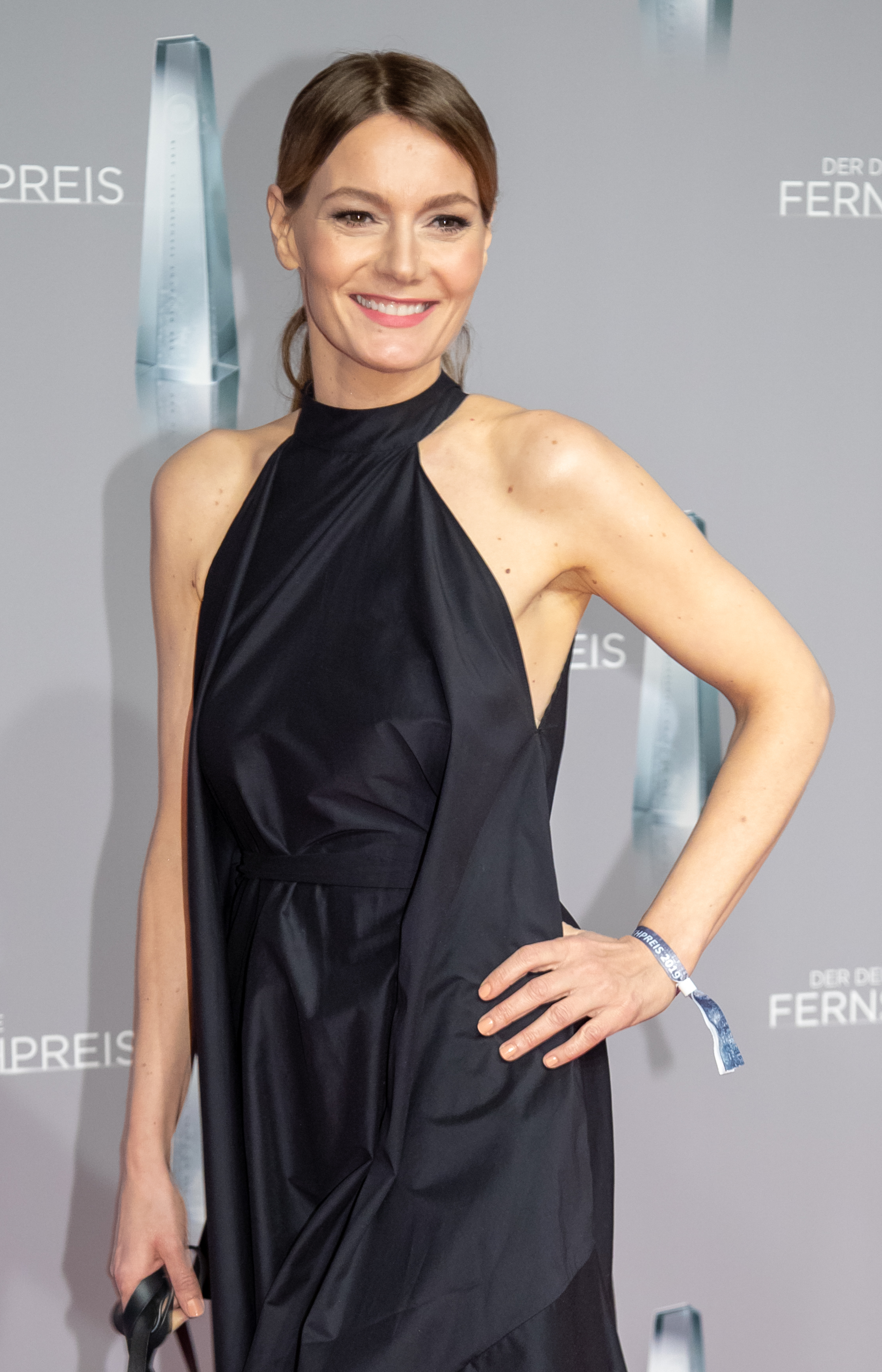
- Hill in 2019
- Born: 14 July 1974 (age 52); West Berlin, West Germany
- Occupations: Actress, comedian
- Website: martinahill.com

Martina Hill (born 14 July 1974) is a German actress and comedian. She has been awarded the German Comedy Award, the German TV Award, as well as the Adolf-Grimme-Preis and the Bambi Award.

== Biography ==
Hill was born in Berlin-Wedding. Her mother was a nurse, and her father was a subway driver. After finishing her Abitur in 1995, she later studied drama.

Hill had her breakthrough in 2007, as an ensemble member of the ProSieben comedy show Switch reloaded, bringing her recognition as a comedian and impersonator. Her arguably most noticeable parodies were those of personas such as Heidi Klum, Angela Merkel, Daniela Katzenberger, Gundula Gause, Amy Winehouse and Dr. Temperance "Bones" Brennan.

In 2009, Hill began portraying "universal expert" Tina Hausten and social media influencer Larissa in the heute-show, a German adaptation of the American news satire The Daily Show. From 2011 onwards, Hill starred in her own format, Knallerfrauen, which is a sketch comedy known for sharp humor and its cutting wit. With the first series of Knallerfrauen, Hill also became very popular in China.

In 2019, she became known to an even broader audience in Germany, when she started her own talk-show with a satirical touch. The "Martina-Hill-Schau" has run on SAT1 (along with Pro7 one of the larger, privatized television channels in Germany).

For her commitment in the Heute-Show she was awarded with numerous prizes to date.

== Filmography (selection) ==
- 2003: Schwer verknallt, TV movie
- 2004: Der Vater meines Sohnes, TV movie
- 2004: Happy Friday, sketch show
- 2005: Mädchen über Bord, TV movie
- 2005: Cologne P.D., TV series
- 2006: Das Beste aus meinem Leben, early-evening TV series
- 2006: Kunstfehler, TV movie
- 2006–2007: Alarm für Cobra 11 – Die Autobahnpolizei, "Flashback" to "Life & Death", TV series
- 2007: Der Dicke, TV series
- 2007: SOKO Wismar, TV series
- 2007: 29... and still a Virgin, TV movie
- 2007–2012: Switch reloaded, comedy series
- 2008: Putzfrau Undercover, TV movie
- 2008: Die Schnüfflerin – Peggy kann's nicht lassen, TV movie
- Since 2009: heute-show, news satire
- 2010: Cindy aus Marzahn und die jungen Wilden, comedy show
- 2010: C.I.S. – Chaoten im Sondereinsatz, TV movie
- 2010: Undercover Love, TV movie
- 2011: Resturlaub, movie
- Since 2011: Knallerfrauen, sketch comedy

== Theater ==
- 2000: Nonne Isabella in Die Rund- und die Spitzköpfe (Berlin)
- 2000: Erna in Kasimir und Karoline (Berlin)
- 2001: Medea in Medea (Berlin)
- 2001: Die Frau auf dem Sockel in Die Frau auf dem Sockel (Berlin)
- 2001: Marjorie in Extremities (Berlin)

== Voice-over-work (selection) ==
- 2009: The Haunted World of El Superbeasto, for Sheri Moon Zombie in the role of Suzi X
- 2011: Cars 2, for Emily Mortimer in the role of Holley Shiftwell
- 2013: Despicable Me 2, for Kristen Wiig in the role of Lucy
- 2014: How To Train Your Dragon 2, for Cate Blanchett in the role of Valka

== Awards ==
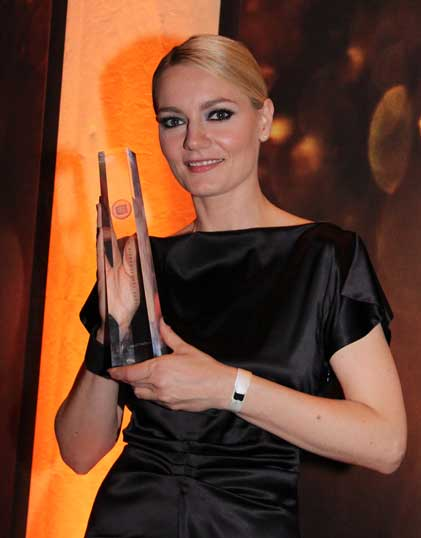
Hill in 2012

- 2007
  - Deutscher Comedypreis as a member of Switch reloaded (Best Sketch Comedy)
- 2008
  - Deutscher Fernsehpreis as a member of Switch reloaded (Best Comedy)
  - Deutscher Comedypreis as a member of Switch reloaded (Best Sketch Comedy)
- 2009
  - Romy TV Award as a member of Switch reloaded (Special Jury Prize)
  - Deutscher Comedypreis for Best Actress
  - Deutscher Comedypreis as a member of the heute-show (Best Comedy Show)
- 2010
  - Adolf-Grimme-Preis as a member of the heute-show (Category Entertainment)
  - Deutscher Fernsehpreis as a member of the heute-show (Category Best Comedy)
  - Deutscher Comedypreis as a member of the heute-show (Category Best Comedy Show)
- 2011
  - Deutscher Comedypreis for Best Actress
  - Deutscher Comedypreis as a member of the heute-show (Best Comedy Show)
- 2012
  - Deutscher Fernsehpreis for Knallerfrauen (Best Comedy Show)
  - Deutscher Comedypreis for Best Actress
  - Bambi Award (Category Comedy)
- 2013
  - Deutscher Comedypreis for Best Actress
- 2014
  - Bambi Award for the heute-show (Category Comedy)
