= Annette Frier =

German actress and comedian

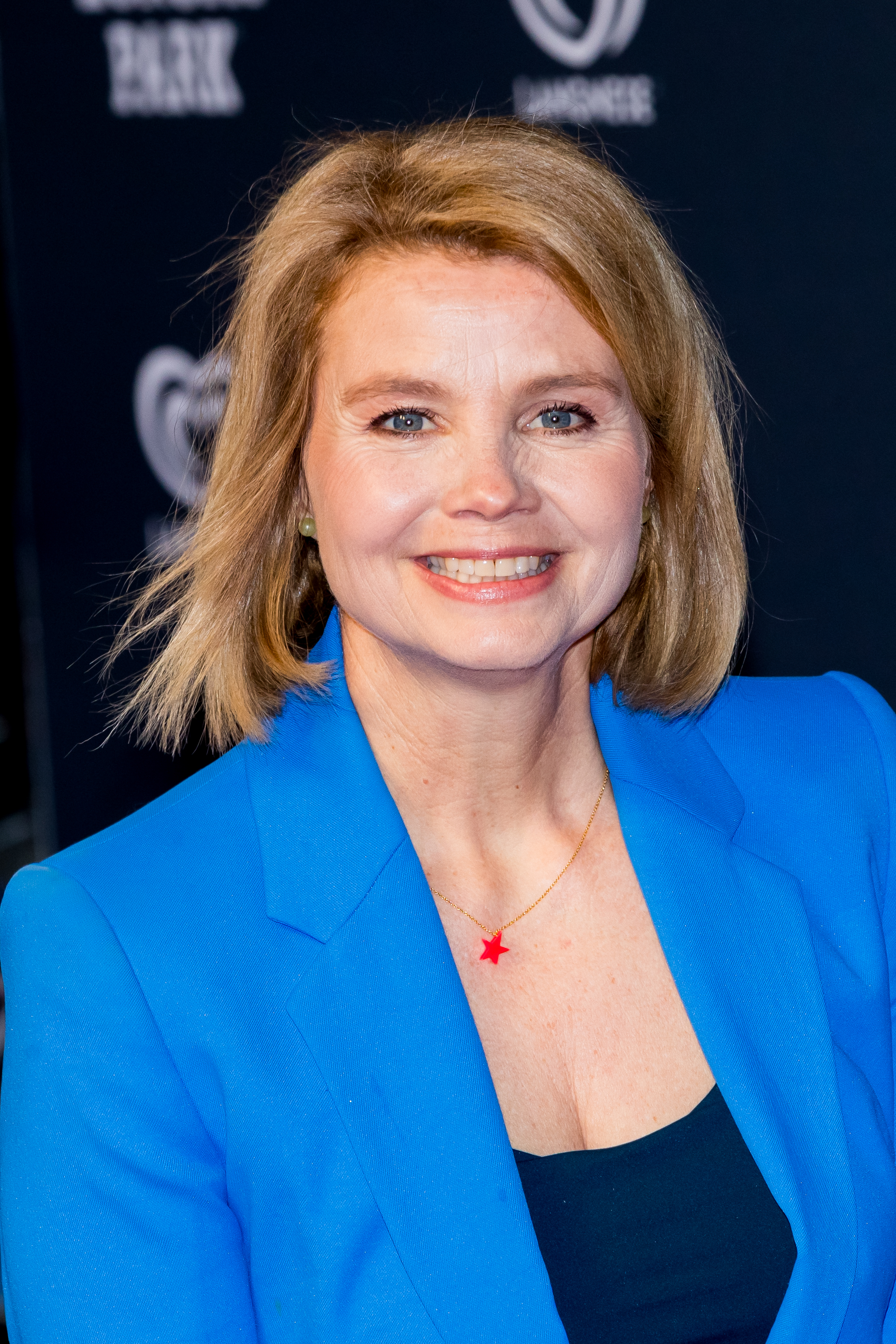
- Frier in 2024
- Born: 22 January 1974 (age 52); Cologne, West Germany
- Occupations: Actress, comedian
- Years active: 1997–present
- Spouse: Johannes Wünsche (m. 2002)
- Children: 2
- Website: annettefrier.de

Annette Frier (born 22 January 1974) is a German actress and comedian, best known for her work in television and film. She gained popularity for her comedic roles and is recognized for her performances in series such as Danni Lowinski and Mord mit Aussicht. Frier has earned acclaim for her versatile acting skills and humorous style.

== Early life ==
She has a younger sister, Caroline (born 1983) and an older sister. After the Abitur she studied classical acting at the school of the German theater "Der Keller" for three years and worked as a theater actress in Cologne.

== Career ==
In 1997, Frier was member of the cast of the RTL series Hinter Gittern – Der Frauenknast for 54 episodes. She played the lesbian prisoner, Vivi Andraschek In the same year she took a part in the thriller Post Mortem which was on RTL as well. The thriller eventually became a series in 2007. In 1998 she started her comedy career in the Pro7 programme Switch. Besides she took part in the Sat.1 crime series SK Kölsch from 1999 to 2001.

From 2000 to 2002, Frier was co-host of the Wochenshow. Since 2004 she is a regular on the improvisational comedy show Schillerstraße.

Since 2005 Frier is also a cast member of the children's programme Sesamstraße (Sesame Street), as well as of the Pro7 comedy series Alles außer Sex. Frier made a guest appearance in an episode of the series Familie Heinz Becker.

Additionally, she hosted the Stefan Raab show SSDSGPS in 2004 and his Bundesvision Song Contest in 2005.

Frier had a starring role in the theatre play Nora in the Theater im Bauturm theater in Cologne.

In 2006, she was awarded a Golden Romy for the best programme idea for Schillerstraße.

== Personal life ==
In 2002, Frier married Johannes Wünsche. Their twins, a daughter and a son, were born in 2008.

== Selected filmography ==
- In the Name of Love (2006, TV film), as Nina
- Spook Inn (2010, TV film), as Valerie
- Love Hurts (2011, TV film), as Dr. Sarah Sellner
- Geister all inclusive (2011, TV film), as Rebecca Hagen
- Und weg bist du (2012, TV film), as Jela Becker
- The Spinning Program (2012, TV film), as Ella Herbst
- The Mommy Mafia (2014, TV film), as Conny Wischnewski
- Die Schlikkerfrauen (2014, TV film), as Angie
- Die Truckerin (2016, TV film), as Toni Zweyer
- Confessions of Felix Krull (2021), as Felix Krulls Mutter
- The Peacock (2023), as Helen
