= Kinder, Kinder =

- Country of origin: Germany

Kinder, Kinder was a German comedy television series. It consisted of one season with 9 episodes that was originally broadcast by RTL Television in 2006.

The plot is centered on the life of the three sisters Katja Eumann (Dana Golombek), Claudia Ziegler-De Vries (Judith Pinnow) and Jessica De Vries (Carolin Kebekus) and their families.
