= Maddin in Love =

- Starring: Martin Schneider
- Country of origin: Germany

Maddin in Love is a German television series.

== See also ==
- List of German television series
