= Knallerfrauen =

German sketch comedy series

Knallerfrauen (Eng: Fire-women) is a German sketch comedy series first aired in 2011. The series stars actress Martina Hill in the main role. The sketches are unrelated and frequently depict absurd situations, often without any dialog. The jokes are similar in part to the French sketch comedy series Vous les femmes.

Knallerfrauen was so popular in China that a Chinese version was produced.

== Content ==
Martina Hill plays herself in various scenes of everyday life. The humor usually arises from the contrast of its occurrence and the more anarchic everyday reactions of the other protagonists.

== Cast ==
| Actor / Actress | Role | Season |
|---|---|---|
| Martina Hill | Various Roles | 1– |
| Maja Beckmann | Various Roles | 1– |
| Matthias Deutelmoser | Various Roles | 1– |
| Michael Krabbe | Various Roles | 1– |
| Marc Benjamin Puch | Various Roles | 1– |
| Anna Schäfer | Various Roles | 1– |
| Jasper Smets | Various Roles | 1– |
| Claus Dieter Clausnitzer | Father | 1– |
| Peggy Lukac | Mother | 1– |
| Andreas Jancke | Various Roles | 4– |
| Maurizio Magno | Child | 1–2 |
| Lara Sophie Schmitz | Baby | 1–2 |

== Awards ==
- 2012: Bambi Awards: Comedy
- 2012: German Comedy Award: Best Sketch Comedy (German: Beste Sketch-Show)
