= Mensch Markus =

German television series

- Genre: Sketch comedy
- Starring: Markus Maria Profitlich; Horst D. Scheel; Tom Lehel; Ingrid Einfeldt; Philipp Schepmann
- Country of origin: Germany

Production
- Production company: Brainpool TV

Original release
- Network: Sat.1
- Release: 17 February 2002 – 2007

Mensch Markus is a German television series, starring Markus Maria Profitlich.

== See also ==
- List of German television series
