= Mirja Boes =

German comedian, actress and singer

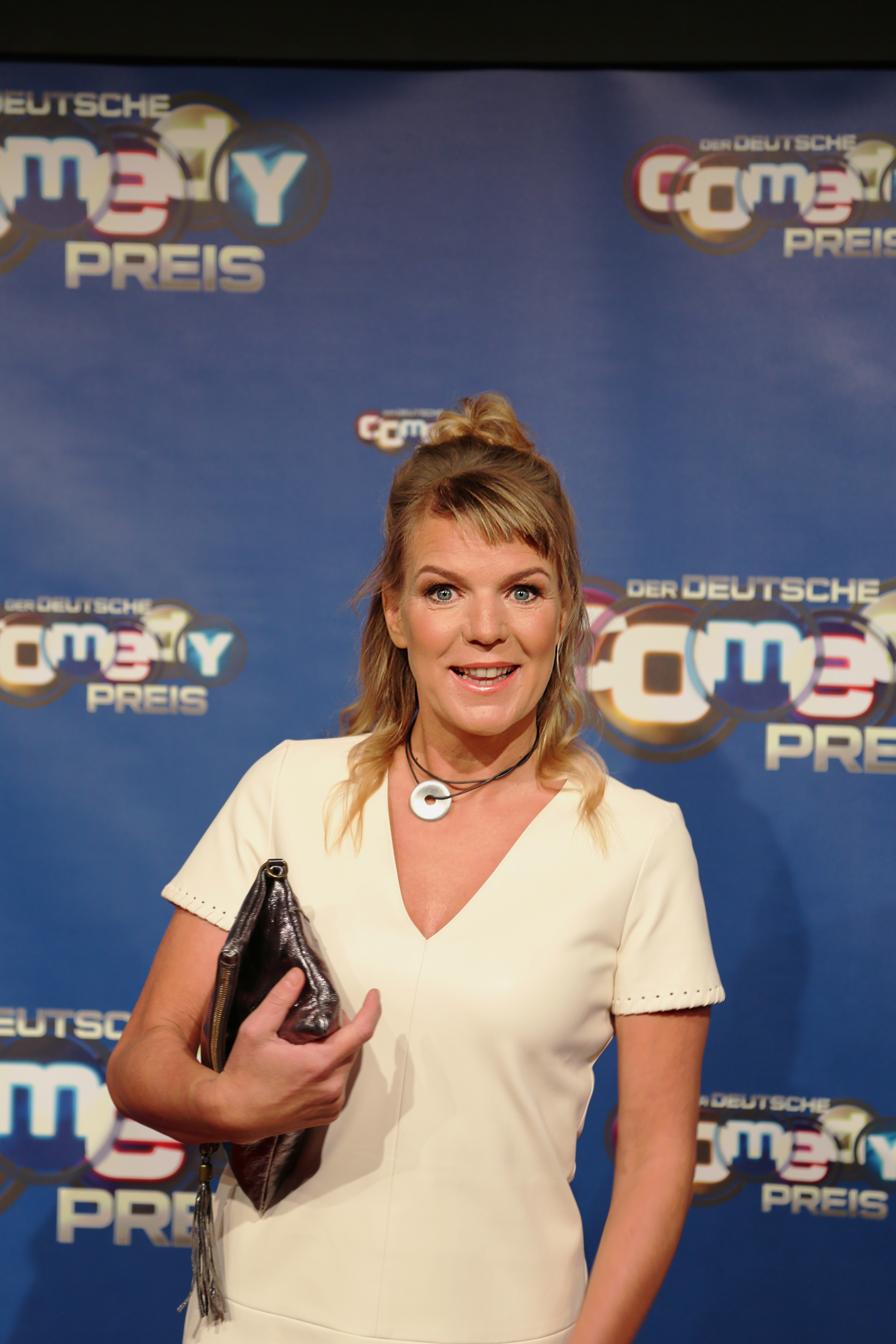
Boes at the 2017 German Comedy Awards

Mirja Boes (born 13 September 1971 in Viersen), also known under her stage name Möhre (German for "carrot"), is a German comedian, actress, and singer. Boes produces comedic party music, and also has released tracks of spoken comedy. She has released a number of singles and has also recorded with other German musicians, as part of the 'Mallorca All-Stars'. She won the 2007 German Comedy Award as a member of the ensemble of 'Frei Schnauze' (Best Comedy Show), and the 2008 German Comedy Award (Best Comedian).

== Biography ==
Boes graduated from Dülken Municipal School in 1991, and studied at the University of Düsseldorf and at the University of Music and Theatre Leipzig. In 1994, she was a member of the theater company 'Compagnia 82', and in 1996, she was with the 'Die Fabulösen Thekenschlampen'. She also played in the improvisational theatre 'Frizzles'.

In the summer of 2001, Boes performed under her stage name Möhre in the nightclub Upper Bavaria in Palma de Mallorca and released her first single. In 2003, her second single "Wir ham doch keine Zeit ..." was released. She was also one of the Mallorca All-Stars, a group of German musicians. In the same year, she worked as a presenter for RTL II.

Since 2002, Boes has appeared regularly on television together with comedians Ralf Schmitz, Mathias Schlung (from 2006), and Markus Majowski. They performed until the end of 2006 in the sketch comedy show Die Dreisten Drei. Following that, she was replaced by Janine Kunze.

Boes has had guest appearances on TV total, Elton.tv, Anke Late Night, Open Muzzle, Clueless Genius, and the Gong Show. In 2005, she played alongside Tom Gerhardt in the feature film Siegfried and in a comedy adaptation of Impy's Island. From December 2006 to May 2007, Boes hosted the Karaoke Showdown. She played the lead in the RTL series Angie from 2006 to 2008.

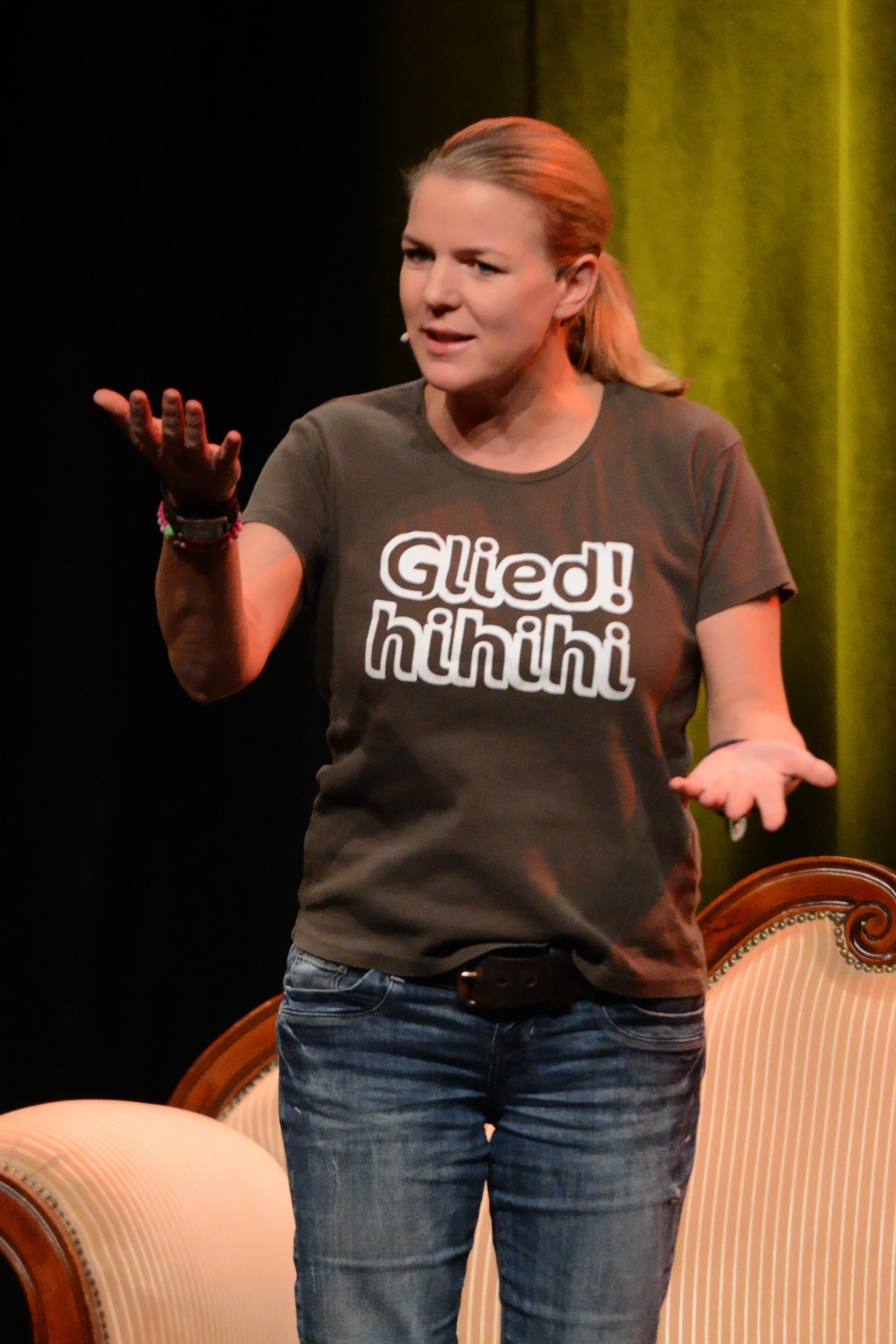
Boes in 2013

In autumn 2007, she toured her first solo performance, Tomorrow I'll End! ... Probably!, where she appeared at the Cologne Comedy Festival.

At the start of 2008, Boes played a leading role alongside Jan Sosniok in the film African Race.

In January 2009, Wunderlich Verlag published her first memoir: Boese: Unspeakably Embarrassing. Boes also produced an audiobook version.

She had a sketch comedy tour Ich bin Boes ("boes" is German for "evil") from February to April 2010. In mid-November 2010, Boes' tour "I'm growing up next week!" was canceled prematurely because she was pregnant at the time. In spring 2011, the program was continued.

In 2015, she appeared in "Der Nächste, bitte!"

== Personal life ==
Boes gave birth to a boy on 3 January 2011.
