= Two Funny – Die Sketch Comedy =

- Country of origin: Germany

Two Funny – Die Sketch Comedy is a German television series.

== See also ==
- List of German television series
