= Die Wochenshow =

- Genre: Comedy, parody, satire
- Starring: Ingolf Lück, Anke Engelke, Markus Maria Profitlich, Marco Rima, Bastian Pastewka, Annette Frier, Michael Kessler, Bürger Lars Dietrich
- Country of origin: Germany

Production
- Production company: Brainpool TV

Original release
- Network: Sat.1
- Release: 1996 – 2002

Die Wochenshow (English: The Weekly Show, lit.: The Week's Review) was a German weekly sketch comedy show that aired on Sat.1 and was produced by Brainpool TV. It first aired on 20 April 1996 and was cancelled early in 2002. The show saw a brief revival starting on 20 May 2011, but only eight episodes were broadcast before it was cancelled due to low ratings and bad press.

== Format ==
The show is a news parody with sketches and recurring characters that often parody popular celebrities, TV shows and films. It bears similarities to formats such as Not the Nine O'Clock News and Saturday Night Live.

The title of the show is a play on Die Deutsche Wochenschau (a wartime cinema newsreel) and Germany's most prestigious TV news program, Tagesschau. Ingolf Lück has occasionally described the show as a modern version of Rudis Tagesshow, a news parody show broadcast on ARD and hosted by Rudi Carrell from 1981 until 1987 and was itself inspired by Not the Nine O'Clock News.

== History ==
The original cast consisted of Ingolf Lück, Anke Engelke, Marco Rima and Bastian Pastewka. In 1999 Marco Rima was replaced by Markus Maria Profitlich and in 2000 Annette Frier replaced Anke Engelke, who left the show to pursue her own projects. in 2001, Michael Kessler and Bürger Lars Dietrich joined the cast. The show was a big ratings success from its beginning and still has a cult following, but was cancelled in 2002 following a drop in ratings.

The 2011 revival cast included Ingolf Lück, Dave Davis, Friederike Kempter, Axel Stein, Matthias Matschke, Carolin Kebekus, Matze Knop and Dominik Kuhn.
