= Ich bin Boes =

- Genre: comedy
- Starring: Mirja Boes
- Opening theme: The Ting Tings – That's not my name
- Country of origin: Germany
- No. of seasons: 3+
- No. of episodes: 23+

Original release
- Network: RTL Television
- Release: 27 February 2010

Ich bin Boes is a German television series. It aired on 27 February 2010 for the first time in German Television. Boes (colloquial for böse) is German for "evil".

== Actors ==
Mirja Boes is shown in every single sketch. There are some other actors too.

== See also ==
- List of German television series
