= Ingolf Lück =

German actor, comedian and television host

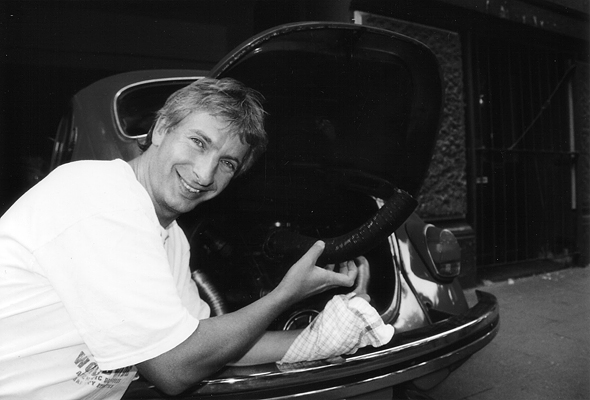
Lück in 2008

Ingolf Guenter Lück (born 26 April 1958) is a German former actor, comedian and television host.

Lück was born in Bielefeld. He hosted several sketch comedy shows; the best known, Die Wochenshow, aired on Sat.1 between 1996 and 2002.

He also hosted Pack die Zahnbürste ein, the German version of Don't Forget Your Toothbrush.

His daughter, Lily Lück, is an actress.

== Selected filmography ==
- Feel the Motion (1985), as Video jockey
- Bang! You're Dead! (1987), as Kai Westerburg
- Kein Mann für eine Nacht (1999, TV film), as Klaus
- My Wife Loves Two (1999, TV film), as Heiner
- Thrill – Spiel um dein Leben (2000, TV film), as Dr. Volker Endress
- Crazy Race (2003, TV film), as Police Chief von Moltke
- The Chocolate Queen (2005, TV film), as Wolfgang
- Chubby Me (2007, TV film), as Dr. Kunz
