= Anke (TV series) =

- Starring: Anke Engelke
- Country of origin: Germany

Original release
- Release: 2000 – 2001

Anke is a German television series produced from 2000 to 2001. Anke Engelke stars in the title role as a fictitious talk show anchor who is successful on camera in solving other people's problems, while being unsuccessful with her own private life.

== See also ==
- List of German television series
