= Thomas Hermanns =

German TV presenter and comedian

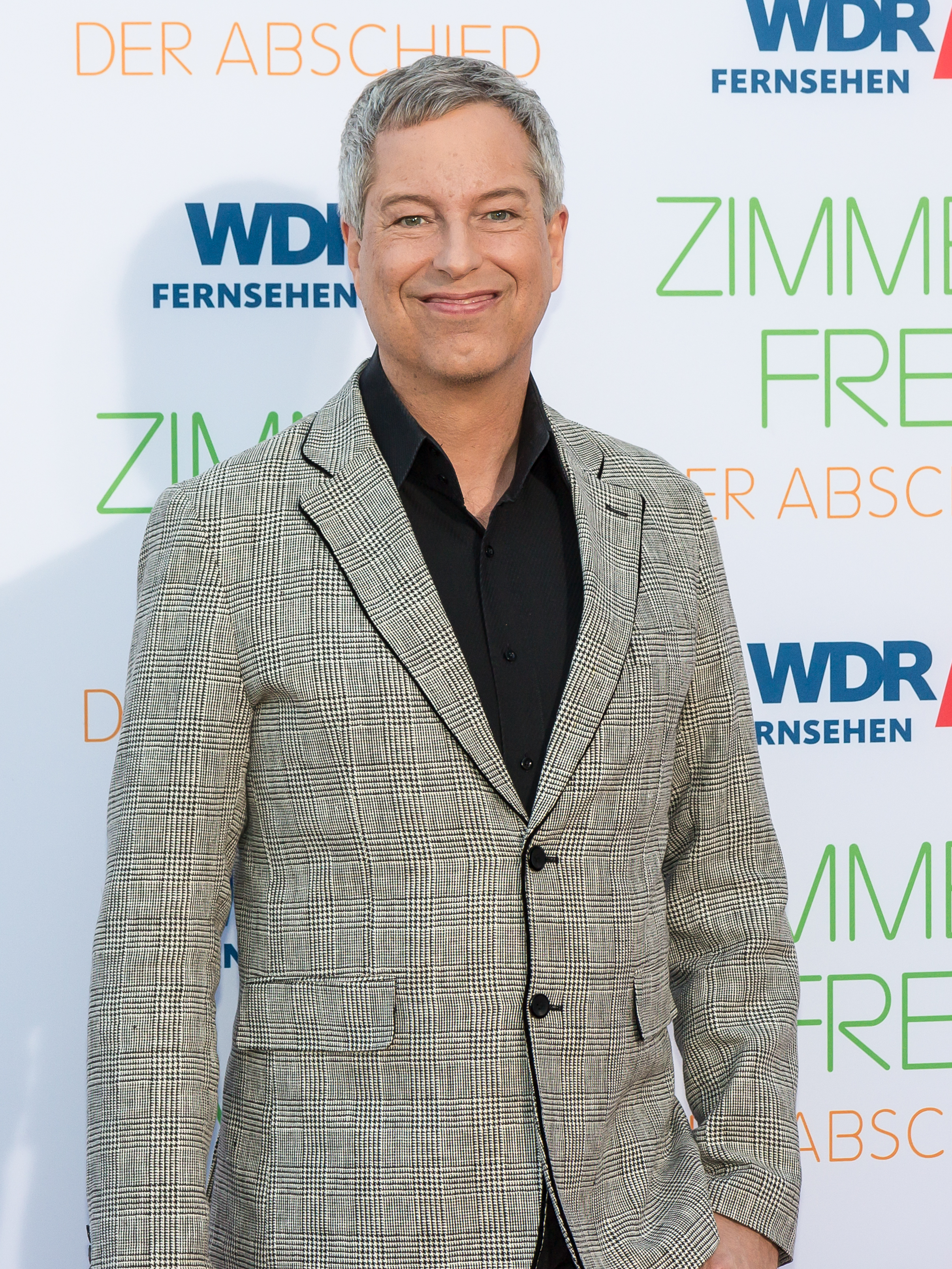
- Hermanns in 2016
- Born: 5 March 1963 (age 62); Bochum, West Germany
- Occupation(s): TV presenter, comedian, screenwriter, director
- Years active: 1992–present

Thomas Hermanns (born 5 March 1963) is a German TV presenter, comedian, screenwriter and director. He is the founder of the comedy show Quatsch Comedy Club.

== Early life ==
Hermanns was born in Bochum. During his childhood, he lived in Nuremberg. After school, he studied theatre.

== Career ==
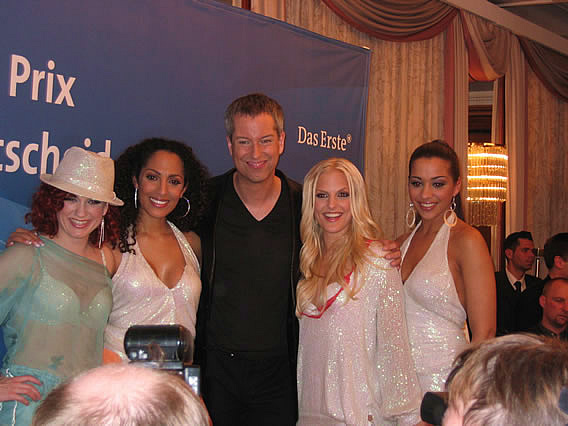
Hermanns with the girl group No Angels, 2008

In 1992, Hermanns started the comedy show Quatsch Comedy Club. The show has been on German channel ProSieben since 1996. In 2003, the show moved to the Theatre Friedrichstadtpalast in Berlin.

Hermanns has written and produced different comedy shows on TV, including Zapped (1998), Back to Life (2000) and Paranoid (2004) for Michael Mittermeier, Gayle Tufts and Cora Frost. Hermanns was a director for Grease and Es fährt ein Zug nach Nirgendwo. Hermanns wrote for the TV series Lukas (1997–1999), Meine beste Freundin (2000) with Mariele Millowitsch and Doris Kunstmann and for Sing, wenn du kannst! (2002) at the theatre Schmidts Tivoli in Hamburg.

Hermanns was TV moderator of Red Nose Day and Popclub on channel ProSieben. In May 2005 and 2006, Hermanns was moderator of Countdown Eurovision. In December 2005, Hermanns worked with Sky du Mont and Bettina Zimmermann as moderators of the Bambi award on German channel ARD. He was also the moderator of the Vorentscheidung Eurovision Song Contest, and was spokesperson for this event from 2005 to 2008.

== Personal life ==
Hermanns is openly gay and has been in a relationship with Wolfgang Macht for 14 years. In September 2008, Hermanns and Macht engaged a civil union.

== Awards ==
- 1997: German Comedy Award, main award for Quatsch Comedy Club
- 2000: German Comedy Award, "Best Comedy Show" for Quatsch Comedy Club
- 2006: Goldene Kamera, category "Comedy"
- 2006: LEA Live Entertainment Award in sector engagement for new artists for Quatsch Comedy Club
- 2007: Kompassnadel by Schwules Netzwerk NRW for special work in LGBT
