= Schillerstraße =

- Also known as: Schiller Street
- Genre: Improvisation; Comedy show
- Country of origin: Germany
- Original language: German

Original release
- Network: Sat.1
- Release: 3 September 2004 – 2011

Schillerstraße ("Schiller Street") was a German improvisational comedy show that aired weekly on Sat.1. It was recorded without a script and broadcast unedited to a large extent. The American broadcaster Fox has earned the licence for Schillerstraße and is to produce its own series.

== Idea and show structure ==
The setting of the show is the living room of the main actor (until 2008 Cordula Stratmann, in 2009 Jürgen Vogel - all the actors keep their real names) who lives on the fictional street "Schillerstraße" in Cologne, Germany. The main character is regularly visited by friends and relatives. The participants only know the topic of the episode in advance. The whole plot has to be improvised comically. The cast receive directions from the Spielleiter (game master) on their headphones, and have to follow the cues, e.g. "Cordula: Tell the others you're pregnant!". The show mostly airs unedited and things that go wrong are not removed, either.

The main cast have included Cordula Stratmann, Annette Frier, Martin "Maddin" Schneider, Michael Kessler and Ralf Schmitz. They interchange with dozens of other guests.

The show was created by Maike Tatzig who is also the show's executive producer. In September 2005 she took over the task of the game master, after Georg Uecker left or had to leave the show for unknown reasons.

The show is produced by Hurricane Fernsehproduktion GmbH.

== Development ==
Schillerstraße first aired on 3 September 2004 on the German TV channel Sat.1. The episodes originally only lasted 30 minutes were aired in the later evening programme and were a big success. For this reason, the run time was extended in January 2005 and moved into a prime time slot on Thursdays. On 26 January 2007 Schillerstraße got a new slot during Friday evening prime time and started with a special 90-minute 100th episode broadcast in which the actors and the game master Maike Tatzig looked back at the previous 99 episodes. The former game master Georg Uecker was not mentioned once; instead they decided to make it look like Maike Tatzig had been the game master since the beginning of the show.

After Uecker left the show, producer Maike Tatzig became the game master in autumn 2005, officially due to schedule problems of Uecker.

On 20 April 2006 the stage was extended. So that the show could reasonably be continued without Cordula Stratmann, who was on maternity leave and was therefore not available for some episodes, they created a pub next door, the Schillereck (Schiller corner). Stratmann's pregnancy was never part of the show. Her character on the show became fat and had to go to a diet camp. The pub is "owned" by Bernhard Hoëcker, a friend of Cordula's. The stages are set in a right angle. To be able to use both stages in one show, a rotatable audience stand was constructed.

== Awards won ==
Year	Award	Categories
2005	Rose d'Or	Preis der Presse (Press Award)
2005	Deutscher Comedypreis (German Comedy Award)	as beste Impro-Serie (best improvised show)
2005	Deutscher Soockmyass (German Television Award)	as beste Impro-Comedy (best improvised comedy)
2006	Goldene Romy (Golden Romy)	in the category beste Programmidee (best idea)
2006	Radio Reet Award 2005	in the category Comedy 2005

== Episodes ==
=== Season 1 ===
1. Die neue Wohnung (Willkommen in der Schillerstraße) – The New Flat (Welcome to Schillerstraße)
2. Babysitter wider Willen – Involuntary Babysitter
3. Gute Geister, schlechte Geister – Good Ghosts, Bad Ghosts
4. Maddins neue Flamme – Maddin's New Acquaintance
5. Das Regal – The Shelf
6. Das Fitness Fieber – Fitness Fever
7. Die Tupperparty – Tupperware Party
8. Der Hausputz – House Cleaning
9. Halloween – Halloween
10. Die Herbstgrippe – Autumn Flu
11. Der Führerschein – Driving License
12. Der Mutterbesuch – Mother's Visit
13. Der Malkurs – Painting Course
14. Die defekte Heizung – The Damaged Radiator
15. Der Charity Ball – Charity Ball
16. Der Advent – Advent

=== Season 2 ===
17. Frohes Neues – Happy New Year
18. Der Ex-Freund – Ex Boyfriend
19. Die Hypnose-Kassette – Hypnosis Cassette
20. Die Schwangerschaft – Pregnancy
21. Kölle Alaaf – Carnival
22. Die Observierung – Observation
23. Das Gipsbein – Casted Bone
24. Die Findelfische – Foundling Fish
25. Das Theaterstück – The Play
26. Die Nachtschwester – Night Nurse
27. Der Lottoschein – Lottery Ticket
28. Der Spieleabend – Game Evening
29. Guck mal, was da krabbelt – Look At What's Crawling There
30. Die Untermieterin – Subtenant
31. Die Kontaktanzeige – Lonely Hearts Ad
32. Schlüsselalarm – Key Alert
33. Das Blind Date – Blind Date
34. Himmelfahrtkommando – Ascension Squad
35. Die Streithennen – Brawlerettes
36. Der kulinarische Nachbar – Culinary Neighbour
37. Die Renovierung – Renovation
38. Der Liebeskummer – Lovesick
39. Die Heimarbeit – Homework
40. Bella Italia – Bella Italia

=== Season 3 ===
41. Die Rückkehr – The Return
42. Die Parteifreunde (Spezial) – Party Friends (Special)
43. Die verlorenen Jungs – The Lost Boys
44. Der Zahn – Tooth
45. Das Oktoberfest – Oktoberfest
46. Die Quizshow – Quiz Show
47. Der Stromausfall – Blackout
48. Die Bewerbung – Job Application
49. Vaterbesuch – Father's visit
50. Die Urlaubsbekanntschaft – Holiday Acquaintance
51. Die Rivalen – Rivals
52. Der Geburtstag – Birthday
53. Der Esoteriktrip – Esotericism Trip
54. Der Töpferkurs – Potter's Workshop
55. Der Fremdverliebte – Foreign Lover
56. Das Liebeshoroskop – Love Horoscope
57. Die Schlägerei – Fight
58. Das Weihnachtswichteln – Secret Santa
59. Der Ski-Urlaub – Ski Holiday
60. Der Pechvogel – Jinx
61. Der Schwiegerelternschreck – Son-In-Law
62. Der Tanzwettbewerb – Dancing Contest
63. Der Lebensmitteltest – Food Control
64. Der Fahnenflüchtling – Deserter
65. Die Geschiedenen – The Divorced
66. Die Jecken sind los – The Crazy Are Coming
67. Der neue Ralf – The New Ralf
68. Der Einbruch – Break-In
69. Der Personaltrainer – Personnel Trainer
70. Der Frühjahrsputz – Spring-Cleaning
71. Der Ausrutscher – The Slip Up
72. Deutschlands neues Topmodel – Germany's New Top Model
73. Frohe Ostern – Happy Easter
74. Die Erbschaft – Legacy
75. Die unfreiwillige WG – Flat Share By Accident
76. Der Psychologe (Note: Cordula Stratmann was not available for these episodes.) – Psychologist
77. Der Abschied – Good Bye
78. Die Anstreicher – Painters
79. Die Nervenkrise – Nervous Crisis
80. Die Eröffnungsparty – The Opening Party
81. Warten auf Gast Nr.1 – Waiting For Guest No. 1
82. Profikellner gesucht! – Master Waiter Wanted
83. Die Marketingkampagne – Marketing Campaign
84. Die Karaokeparty – Karaoke Party

=== Season 4 ===
85. Willkommen zurück! – Welcome Back!
86. Die veränderte Cordula – Changed Cordula
87. Die Geschäftsidee – Business Idea
88. Der Wasserschaden – Water Damage
89. Der Gutachter – The Assessor
90. Der Astronaut – The Astronaut
91. Der Kurschatten – Diet Camp Acquaintance
92. Die Wette – The Bet
93. Der Liebesbote – Messenger of Love
94. Der Martinszug – St. Martin's Procession
95. Die Wetterfee – Weather Host
96. Der Hochzeitsplaner – Wedding Planner
97. Das Tai-Chi-Video – Tai Chi Tape
98. Die Mehrwertsteuererhöhung – Increase of VAT
99. Der Weihnachtsbasar – Christmas Bazaar
100. Der Director's Cut – Director's Cut
101. Der Steckbrief – Profile
102. Tetjes Schwester – Tetje's Sister
103. Die Karnevalsparty – Carnival Party
104. Der zweite Frühling – Indian Summer
105. Die Thekenbauer – Bar Builders
106. Die Safari – Safari
107. Die Kegelbahn – Bowling Alley
108. Der Wasserhahn – Water Tap
109. Bernhards Rückkehr – Bernhard's Return
110. Der Mönch – The Monk
111. Der Talentwettbewerb – Talent Competition

=== Season 5 ===
112. Nachmieter gesucht! – Searching For The Next Tenant!
113. Die Einrichtungsprofis – Furnishing Professionals
114. Das Rollenangebot – Role Offer
115. D'r Kölsche Jung – The Boy From Cologne
116. Der Pokerabend - Poker evening
117. Der Alleskönner - The allrounder
118. Das erste Date – The First Date
119. Der Check-up – The Check-up
120. Die Homestory – The Homestory
121. Der Koffertausch – The Suitcase Exchange
122. Kopflos in Köln – Headless in Cologne
123. Pochers heiße Pyjamaparty - Pocher's hot slumber party

== International versions ==
The format was sold internationally and the rights were sold to the American media company Fox which is going to produce the show in the United States, United Kingdom, Australia, New Zealand and Canada. The rights have been sold as well to France, Italy, Spain, Belgium, the Netherlands, Finland, Estonia, Russia, Romania, Hungary, Turkey, Czech Republic, Israel and Bulgaria.

In South Africa the show is produced and aired by Afrikaans channel kykNet under the title Proesstraat.

In 2011 the show was canceled in Germany.

Country	Name	Presenter(s)	Channel	Date of transmission
Germany (original format)	Schillerstraße	Georg Uecker (2004–2005); Maike Tatzig (2005–2011)	Sat.1	September 3, 2004 – 2007; 2009–2011
Italy	Buona la prima!	Ale & Franz	Italia 1	April 17, 2007 – September 4, 2009; June 14, 2017 – June 28, 2017
Italy	Improvviserai	Ale & Franz	Rai 2	July 18, 2019 – February 26, 2020
Estonia	Vilde tee	Artur Talvik & Tiit Palu	TV3	2009–2010
Russia; Belarus; Ukraine	Южное Бутово; Juzhnoje Butovo	Aleksandr Tsekalo & Ruslan Sorokin	Channel One; ONT; ICTV	September 13, 2009 – September 19, 2010
France	Totale Impro	Benjamin Castaldi	M6	November 26, 2005 – February 25, 2006
Finland	Runeberginkatu	Minttu Mustakallio, Elina Knihtilä, Jukka Rasila & Juha Varis	Nelonen	September 3, 2007 – November 19, 2007
South Africa	Proesstraat	Nina Swart; Elize Cawood; Nina Swart & Pedro Kruger	kykNet	February 2010 – 2016
Bulgaria	Младост 5 Mladost 5	Toshko Yordanov	bTV	March 15, 2013 – May 31, 2013
Canada (Quebec)	Rue King	Stéphane Bellavance	TVA	September 16, 2020 – March 23, 2021
