= Ingrid Hornef =

German sculptor, installation artist, curator and painter

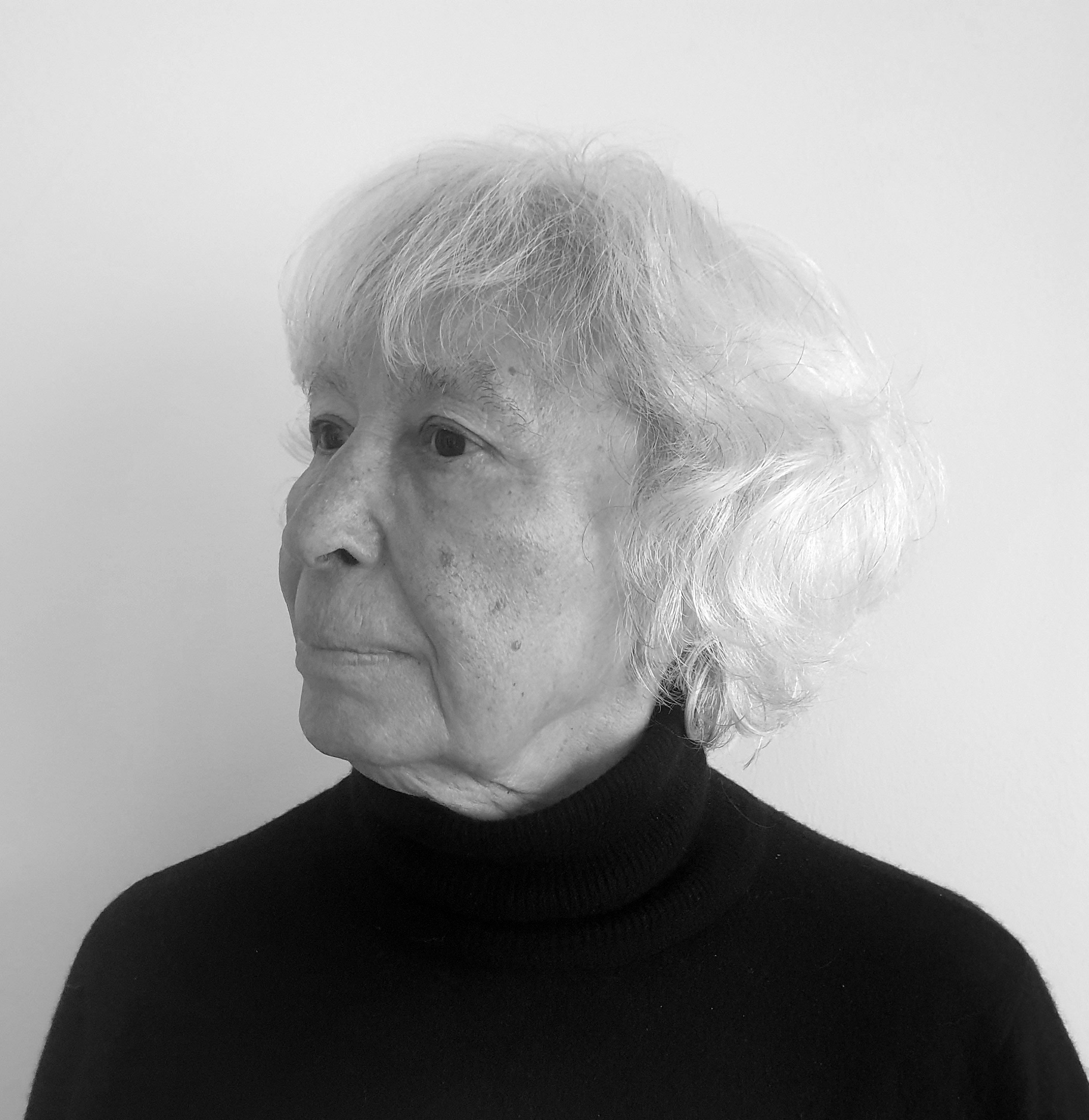
- Born: August 12, 1940 (age 85); Friedberg, Hesse, Germany
- Education: Autodidact
- Known for: Concrete Art, Installation, Sculpture
- Website: ingrid-hornef.de

Ingrid Hornef (born August 12, 1940) is a German sculptor, installation artist, curator and painter. She is a representative of Concrete art and became best known for using a dice as a random number generator in her series of works Alea iacta est (Latin for the die is cast).

== Life ==
Ingrid Hornef acquired her professional skills as an autodidact and opened her own studio in 1985. In her early days, she was mainly concerned with pottery and attended ceramic courses in 1984 and 1985 with the well-known Japanese ceramic artist Takeshi Yasuda. In 1992 she took part in workshops by Mária Geszler Garzuly in Kecskemét, Hungary.

Besides her work as an artist, Hornef is also active as a curator. In 2002, she initiated the temporary sculpture trail Land schafft Kunst (Land Creates Art) as part of the Rhine-Main Regional Park between Hochheim-Massenheim and Wiesbaden-Delkenheim. The area is a typical industrial landscape with seemingly intact nature, but at the same time there are high-rise buildings and high-voltage power lines that dominate the landscape. Hornef invited 21 artists to create their works especially for this place.

In July 2019, Hornef organized a German-Greek–WWII–memorial and peace project named Building Bridges, together with city councilor Annette Courtis, who has Greek roots and who, like Hornef, lives in Hofheim am Taunus. In a small village called Chouni (municipal district of Agrinio), Greece, 16 German and Greek artists created works of art from sandstone under the direction of Hornef, in which they dealt with the history of Chouni during World War II. The village had been almost completely burned down by German soldiers in 1944. Parallel to this, lectures on the effects of the Second World War in Greece were held. The resulting sculptures were permanently installed on the village square in Chouni.

In July 2021, a corresponding workshop took place in Hofheim, again led by Hornef. Here, too, the invited German and Greek artists formed works of art in which they dealt with the historical background of the time. A jury selected ten sculptures that were permanently installed as a peace path near the memorial for fallen soldiers of the two world wars. The mayor of the city of Hofheim, Christian Vogt, acknowledged the commitment of the two initiators: "The peace path at the memorial is intended to remind us not to forget the terrible chapter in German history, but it is also intended to show that we can overcome the rifts that have arisen between our peoples today and open a new chapter together." (In German: "Der Friedenspfad am Ehrenmal soll uns mahnen, das schreckliche Kapitel der deutschen Geschichte nicht zu vergessen, soll aber auch zeigen, dass wir entstandene Gräben zwischen unseren Völkern heute überwinden und gemeinsam ein neues Kapitel aufschlagen können.")

In 2022, Hornef curated the Art Concret exhibition at the Museum of Modern Art in Hünfeld together with Veronika Rodenberg. 26 artists from France, all members of the artists' association Salon des Réalités Nouvelles in Paris, France, presented an overview of current trends in Concrete Art.

Ingrid Hornef lives and works both in Bages in the south of France and in Hofheim. She is a member of the German artist group "Gruppe Konkret" and of the Salon des Réalités Nouvelles in Paris.

== Work ==
In the course of her many years of artistic activity, Hornef has worked with a variety of different materials: clay, wood, metal, stone, etc. Color is used to accentuate the surfaces, and the artist often works with black and white contrasts. The turn to Concrete Art can be roughly read from the respective work phase with specific materials. Since 2002, the artist has concentrated on the series of works Alea iacta est (The die is cast), in which she determines elements of the respective work using a dice as a random number generator.

=== Clay works ===
Hornef turned to abstraction for the first time in her Schnürungen-series (Lacing) (circa 1990–1997). Instead of figurative ceramics, there are now abstract objects that are vaguely reminiscent of human figures. Hornef formed clay tubes, which she tied with a rope, thus determining what shape the tube should take. Factors which the artist could not control had an influence on the resulting form: "It can come to arbitrary eruption, to tearing of the clay, to buckling, to soft bending and gentle flexing. In the subsequent firing process, the level of temperature, any reduction, and the various surface treatments play a crucial role." (In German: "Es kann zum willkürlichen Ausbruch kommen, zum Reißen des Tons, zum Knicken, zum weichen Biegen und sanften Beugen. Beim anschließenden Brennvorgang spielen die Höhe der Temperatur, eine eventuelle Reduktion und die verschiedenen Oberflächenbehandlungen eine entscheidende Rolle.")

=== Sculptures in Stone ===
Until about 2006 the artist concentrated on the production of large and small stone sculptures. Hornef mostly used sandstone for the large works, smaller sculptures were created from tuff.

Her first major project was the Schauaufsland-sculpture (1999) for the so-called Panoramaweg of the Rhine-Main Regional Park. This section of the regional park is actually entitled Landwehrweg, but is also called Panoramaweg because of its beautiful panoramic view. It lies between the neighborhoods/towndistricts of Flörsheim named Wicker and Bad Weilbach.

Taking up the concept of the Regional park, according to which works of art were supported and intended to make the Rhein-Main area more attractive for the residents, five stone sculptures were created by artists as part of an international sculpture symposium. The resulting artworks remained in the landscape. The works were created on site in public, so that interested visitors could view the works and speak with the artists. Ingrid Hornef worked with a sandstone that weighed 12 tons and was 2.85 meters (roughly 9.35 feet) high.

In 2000, as part of the archeological Spessart-project in Aschaffenburg, she created the sandstone sculpture Siblings for the Jagdschloss Luitpoldhöhe in Rohrbrunn, in which she referred to a local legend: Two siblings found a cauldron of gold while playing, and when they tried to rescue it, it had disappeared again. The massive stone is split in two at the top, thus suggesting the two siblings. The bowl (the pot) rests on the two indicated heads of the siblings.

Common to all of the artist's large sculptures is the abstracted, block-like design: "Obvious is the artist's interest in a solid, block-like simplified body form - here, too, a kinship to archaic cultures - and the feeling for large surfaces as the boundary of a compact volume. Monumental, formally rigorous, concessionlessly abstract, the works make great demands on the viewer." (In German: "Offensichtlich ist das Interesse der Künstlerin an einer soliden, blockhaft vereinfachten Körperform – auch hier eine Verwandtschaft zu archaischen Kulturen – und das Gefühl für große Flächen als Begrenzung eines kompakten Volumens. Monumental, formal streng, konzessionslos abstrakt, stellen die Arbeiten hohe Anforderungen an den Betrachter.")

=== Reliefs ===
As early as the mid-1990s, Hornef turned to Concrete Art and exclusively focused on line, surface and space in her works.

Now she creates reliefs. The artist's intuitive pencil drawings form the basis of these works. The carrier material is MDF wood panels. They are drilled by the artist and painted in black or white. Wooden dowels and toothpicks are inserted into the holes create the lines. Also, the wooden dowels and toothpicks are painted to give the black and white contrast: "White wooden dowels instrument the black surfaces. Not dissimilar to small plugs, they sit at the corners of a fine white line, which, like in a circuit diagram, lays a strictly horizontal-vertical, but meandering path from left to right across the entire work. What becomes clear here also applies to the artist's later work: a strictly systematic arrangement of horizontals, verticals - later also of diagonals and spaces – determines the overall impression of the work, orchestrated by a binary black-and-white contrast." (In German: "Weiße Holzdübel instrumentieren die schwarz gehaltenen Flächen. Kleinen Steckern nicht unähnlich, sitzen sie an den Eckpunkten einer feinen weißen Linie, die wie in einem Schaltplan einen streng horizontal-vertikalen, jedoch auf und ab mäandernden Weg von links nach rechts über das gesamte Werk legt. Was hier deutlich wird, gilt auch für das spätere Werk der Künstlerin: Eine streng systematisch wirkende Anordnung von Waagerechten, Senkrechten – später auch von Diagonalen und Leerstellen – bestimmt den Gesamteindruck des Werks, instrumentiert durch einen binären Schwarz-Weiß-Kontrast."

=== On the application of chance in her art ===
Pictures of the artwork-serie Alea iacta est
- Artist: Ingrid Hornef
- Year: since 2002
- Website: https://www.ingrid-hornef.de/arbeiten-aktuelles/alea-iacta-est

Many Concrete Art artists use chance as an element of their artistic work. By allowing chance to take over the role of making decisions regarding the design of a work, it frees the artist from expressing their own sensitivities in their work and allows them to create objective art instead.

Ingrid Hornef is also fascinated by chance: "For me, chance means a liberation of subjective and emotional elements in favor of objective processes. Chance is not arbitrariness. It is subject to its conditions and this includes that I recognize its result. Similar to a scientific process I try to find answers to our limited knowledge about chance, the wide space of the possible. Over time, the question 'what is chance' has become more and more important to me." (In German: "Zufall bedeutet für mich eine Befreiung subjektiver und emotionaler Elemente zugunsten objektiver Prozesse. Zufall ist nicht Willkür. Er unterliegt seinen Bedingungen und dazu gehört, dass ich sein Resultat anerkenne. Ähnlich einem wissenschaftlichen Verfahren versuche ich Antworten auf unser begrenztes Wissen über den Zufall zu finden, den weiten Raum des Möglichen. Im Laufe der Zeit wurde die Frage ‚Was ist Zufall‘ immer wichtiger für mich.")

Since 2002, Hornef has devoted herself exclusively to researching this phenomenon. An expression of this is her series of works Alea iacta est, which she constantly expands, using an ordinary dice. Not only paintings, but also reliefs and three-dimensional objects are created. For the spatial installation Mikado at Skulpturen im Park in Mörfelden, she also used the dice as a random number generator: the 20 round logs, each three meters long, were divided into six segments, and Hornef let the cube decide which of them would be painted black. In her other works, she begins with an MDF board, which she paints black or white, and uses drilled holes, toothpicks, and Wooden dowels to structure the works. In a kind of controlled chance Hornef determines the basic rules of the work, such as the dimensions of the images, the lines (horizontal, vertical, or diagonal), and also the criteria for the elements to be thrown.

The artist mostly works with square panels on which she draws a square grid with a pencil that remains visible. It is noteworthy that the artist herself indirectly provides the technique for decoding the works by addressing chance as the medium of her work.

Albrecht Beutelspacher explains the method of working of Ingrid Hornef by using the artwork with the title Object 274: "If you concentrate on the horizontal lines at the top left of the picture, it becomes clear which numbers of dice have fallen: The first horizontal line below the square indicates that a one has fallen. In the following four squares, the lower horizontal line is missing: the four missing lines illustrate that a four has fallen. This is followed by two more horizontal lines, representing the number of eyes, two. A two follows for the blanks, a six for visible horizontal lines, and so on. [...] It is hard to see, but remarkable, that Ingrid Hornef had to throw the cube 118 times until the picture was finished." (In German: "Konzentriert man sich auf die horizontalen Linien oben links im Bild, erschließt sich, welche Augenzahlen gefallen sind: Die erste horizontale Linie unter dem Quadrat zeigt an, dass eine Eins gefallen ist. Bei den folgenden vier Quadraten fehlt der untere waagerechte Strich: die vier fehlenden Linien veranschaulichen, dass eine Vier gefallen ist. Darauf folgen zwei weitere waagerechte Linien, die für die Augenzahl Zwei stehen. Es folgen eine Zwei für die Leerräume, eine Sechs für sichtbare waagerechte Linien und so fort. […] Es ist schwer zu erkennen, aber beachtlich, dass Ingrid Hornef 118-mal den Würfel werfen musste, bis das Bild fertig war.")

Thus, strictly geometric pictorial works are created that are reminiscent of circuit diagrams or path networks. Noted Art historian Birgit Möckel sums it up: "What at first glance appears to be the mysterious code of a system that has not yet been deciphered is the very concrete documentation of chance." (In German: "(In German: "Was auf den ersten Blick als geheimnisvoller Code eines noch nicht entschlüsselten Systems erscheint, ist die ganz konkrete Dokumentation des Zufalls.")

== Solo exhibitions (selection) ==
- 2008: Alea iacta est, Forum Konkrete Kunst, Erfurt, Germany
- 2014: Alea iacta est, Kunstverein Bellevue-Saal, Wiesbaden, Germany
- 2018: Ingrid Hornef – Ordnung: Nichts als Zufall, Museum Mathematikum, Giessen, Germany
- 2020: Zeitgleich: Spielfelder des Zufalls, Stadtmuseum Hofheim, Hofheim
- 2022: Alea iacta est, LAC, Lieu d’Art Contemporain, Sigean, France
- 2024: Alea iacta est, Galerie Leonhard, Graz, Austria
- 2025: Alea iacta est, Galerie Floss & Schultz, Cologne, Germany
- 2025: 3 Positionen, Kunstverein Bad Nauheim, Germany

== Group exhibitions (selection) ==
- 2008: Rationale II, Bonn Women's Museum, Bonn, Germany
- 2008: Ein Jahr: 31 Positionen – 30 Räume, Museum Modern Art Hünfeld, Hünfeld, Germany
- 2009: ~~Figürlich, Abstrakt~~, Konkret: Grenzgänger der Konkreten Kunst, Künstlerverein Walkmühle, Wiesbaden, Germany
- 2011: Positionen – 30 Jahre gruppe konkret, Kunstforum, Bonn, Germany
- 2012: Rationale III – Raum und Bau, Bonn Women's Museum, Bonn, Germany
- 2013: Die Kunst geht in die Stadt, Kunsthaus Rehau, Institut für konstruktive Kunst und Konkrete Poesie, Rehau, Germany
- 2014: Zum Zufall, Kunstverein Kunsthaus Potsdam, Germany
- 2016: Rythme et Géometrie, Musée Bertrand, Châteauroux, France
- 2017: Gäste Konkret, Sammlung Schroth, Hellweg Konkret, Soest, Germany
- 2018: Gruppenausstellung der Nominierten zum 5. Internationalen André-Evard-Preis, Kunsthalle Messmer, Riegel am Kaiserstuhl, Germany
- 2018: Exhibition Paris V City Hall, European Society for Mathematics and the Arts (ESMA), Paris, France
- 2019 – continuing: Participation in Group-Shows at the Salon des Réalités Nouvelles, Paris, France
- 2019: Cinétique, (Traveling exhibition u. a. in Paris, Budapest, Vienna, Kranj, the town of Stoffen und Munich (Üblacker-Häusl))
- 2021: 40 Jahre Gruppe Konkret, Kunstforum Bonn, Germany
- 2021: Von Gebliebenen und Heimkehrern, Kunstverein Friedberg, Friedberg
- 2022: Small Structures, Sehsaal, Vienna, Austria
- 2023: MADI Universe 77: miniMADImax, Saxon Art Gallery, Budapest, Hungary
- 2023: Encore nous ...:Biennale Internationale d’art non-objectif de la ville Pont de Claix, Moulins de Villancourt, Le Pont-de-Claix, France
- 2023: Kunstspektrale, (A collaboration with the Görlitz Collections for History and Culture and the Foundation for Art and Culture in Upper Lusatia), Königshain Fortress, Königshain, Germany
- 2023: Curating - Creating, Galerie Abstract Project, Paris, France
- 2023: Réalités Nouvelles: Hors les murs (Réalités Nouvelles: Outside the Walls), kokoka Kyoto International Community House, (Paris and Kyoto are Sister cities), Kyoto, Japan
- 2023: 77. Réalités Nouvelles, Salon des Réalités Nouvelles, Paris, France
- 2024: Nicht abstrakt, Ganz konkret, Museum Modern Art, Hünfeld, Germany
- 2024: Réalités Nouvelles: Hors les murs, Wu Dengyi Art Museum, Taipei, Taiwan
- 2024: Zeigt euch konkret!, Kunstverein Willigrad, Lübstorf, Germany
- 2024: 3D. Wegweisende Plastik der konkreten Gegenwart, Museum Wilhelm Morgner, Soest, Germany
- 2025: Konkrete Poesie, Kunstraum Stoffen, Stoffen, Germany
- 2026: Biennale am Main: Der persönliche Blick ... auf die Sammlung Haas van Gemmern (Biennale on the Main: A Personal Perspective ... on the Haas van Gemmern Collection), Kunsthaus Taunusstein, Taunusstein, Germany

== Installations in public spaces (selection) ==
- 2002: Fernrohre (Tele-Visionen), Regionalpark Rhein-Main, Flörsheim, Germany
- 2007: Tele-Visionen II, Hamburg Observatory, Hamburg, Germany
- 2009: Blaue Blume, Gallery of the town of Mörfelden-Walldorf, Germany
- 2010: Fernweh, Skulpturenpark Meerseits, Wennigstedt, Sylt, Germany
- 2012: What about the Others (Installation for the open-air exhibition Ark 2012), Seligenstadt, Germany
- 2015: Mikado, Gallery of the town of Mörfelden-Walldorf, Germany
- 2024: Mikado, permanent installation in Altier, France

== Works in collections (selection) ==
- Museum Mathematikum, Giessen, Germany
- Centre pour le Constructivisme et l’Art Concret, Bornem, Belgium
- Palatinate Gallery of Art/Pfalzgalerie, Kaiserslautern, Germany
- Museum Modern Art Hünfeld, Hünfeld, Germany
- Bonn Women's Museum, Bonn, Germany
- Kulturhistorisches Museum Görlitz
- Musée Tavet-Delacour Pontoise, France
- Centre d’Art Contemporain Frank Popper, Marcigny, France
- LAC, Lieu d’art Contemporain, Sigean, France
- Artothek, Stadt Wiesbaden

== Bibliography ==
- Ingrid Hornef: Plastiken und Skulpturen 1991–1994. Mit Fremdtexten von u. a. Erich Fitzau und Ursula Teschner [Ingrid Hornef: Sculptures and Three-Dimensional Art. With third-party-texts of among others Erich Fitzau and Ursula Teschner] (in German). Hofheim am Taunus: Ingrid Hornef. 1994.
- Skulpturenmeile: Land schafft Kunst, 18.8. – 29.9.2002 [Sculpture Mile: Land Creates Art, 8/18 - 9/29/2002] (in German). Hofheim am Taunus: de:Deutsche Gesellschaft für Gartenkunst und Landschaftskultur, Landschaftsverband Hessen. 2002.
- Die Rationale II – Konstruktive, Konkrete Kunst. Katalog zur gleichnamigen Ausstellung im Frauenmuseum Bonn [The Rationale II - Constructive, Concrete Art. Catalog for the exhibition of the same name at the Bonn Women's Museum]. Bonn: Marianne Pfitzen; Bonn Women's Museum. 2008. ISBN 978-3-940482-099.
- ~~Figürlich, Abstrakt~~, Konkret: Grenzgänger der Konkreten Kunst [~~Figurative, Abstract~~ Concrete: Frontier artists of Concrete Art] (in German). Wiesbaden: Kunstverein Walkmühle. 2009.
- Ingrid Hornef (in German). Wiesbaden: Carola Weber. 2010. ISBN 978-3-00-030383-8. Two volumes: 1, Linie, Fläche, Raum (Volume 1: Line, Surface, Space); 2, Kunst im öffentlichen Raum: Skulptur, Installation, Modell (Volume 2 Art in public spaces: sculpture, installation, model)
- Die Rationale III – Raum und Bau. Katalog zur gleichnamigen Ausstellung im Frauenmuseum Bonn [The Rationale III - Space and Construction. Catalog for the exhibition of the same name at the Bonn Women's Museum]. Bonn: Marianne Pfitzen; Bonn Women's Museum. 2012. ISBN 978-3-940482-55-6.
- Ingrid Hornef: Alea iacta est – Der Würfel ist gefallen. Mit Texten von u. a. Lida van Mengden and Albrecht Beutelspacher [Ingrid Hornef: Alea iacta est - the die is cast. With texts of among others Lida van Mengden and Albrecht Beutelspacher] (in German). Hofheim am Taunus: Ingrid Hornef. 2016. ISBN 978-3-00-052613-8.
