= Esma =

Esma or ESMA may refer to:

== Acronyms ==
- Escuela Superior Militar de Aviación "Cosme Rennella B.", Ecuadorian Air Force
- Former Escuela Superior de Mecánica de la Armada, used as a detention centre in Argentina 1976–1983, now Navy Petty-Officers School
- Essential Services Maintenance Act, India
- European Securities and Markets Authority, Paris
- European Society for Mathematics and the Arts
- École Supérieure Des Métiers Artistiques fr:École supérieure des métiers artistiques

== Given name ==
- Esma Agolli (1928–2010), Albanian actress
- Esma Aydemir (born 1992), Turkish middle-distance runner
- Esma Nur Çakmak (born 2004), Turkish female arm wrestler
- Esma Cannon (1905–1972), Australian film actor
- Esma Gökülü (born 2005), Turkish judoka
- Esmâ Ibret Hanim (1780–?), Ottoman calligrapher and poet
- Esmaa Mohamoud (born 1992), African-Canadian sculptor
- Esma Nayman (1899–1967), Turkish politician
- Esma Oniani (1938–1999), Georgian poet, essayist, and painter
- Esma Redžepova (1943–2016), Romani Macedonian vocalist, songwriter, and humanitarian
- Esma Sultan (disambiguation), three Ottoman princesses
- Esma Ulqinaku (born 1940), Albanian politician
- Esma Voloder, Bosnian-Australian actress, model, beauty pageant titleholder

== Other uses ==
- Esma Sultana Mansion
