= Ulqinaku =

Ulqinaku is an Albanian surname. Notable people with the surname include:

- Esma Ulqinaku (born 1940), Albanian politician
- Hafiz Ali Ulqinaku (1855–1913), Albanian imam, alim and patriot
- Hajro Ulqinaku (born 1938), Albanian writer
- Mujo Ulqinaku (1896–1939), Albanian Navy sergeant
