= The Eraser Company =

- Industry: Manufacturing
- Founded: 1911
- Headquarters: Syracuse, NY United States
- Key people: Marcus Bevard (CEO)
- Website: The Eraser Company

The Eraser Company is an American manufacturer of electrical products best known for its wire and tube cutting machines. It also manufactures and markets other related devices for a variety of mostly commercial industries.

The Eraser Company was founded by Joseph K. Rush in 1911. The company is located in Syracuse, New York and is currently headed by CEO and president Marcus BeVard.

== History ==
The Eraser Company was incorporated in 1935 Until the 1940s, the Rush eraser was the only product manufactured by The Eraser Company. It was used for typing and drafting corrections on printed material. Expansion followed the company's discovery that the product would also remove film insulation from magnet wires. Since then, the company developed its capabilities beyond magnet wire stripping into cable, wire and tube processing (stripping, feeding, cutting, twisting, measuring, dereeling) equipment, and infrared heating devices.

The company is family owned and operated and has been based in Syracuse, NY since its establishment.

The company opened and operated a sales and distribution facility in Andover, England in 1974, with the purpose of sales and service to Europe. Because of the global nature of business by the 21st century, this operation was consolidated to the company’s Syracuse headquarters in 2004. Additional export markets include Latin America, South America, Mexico, Western Europe, Africa, Middle East, Asia, Pacific Rim, Australia, China, and Canada.

In May 2009, the Manufacturers Association of Central New York posthumously honored Eraser Company's past president, Ralph BeVard, Sr. with its 2009 Wall of Fame Award for his contributions to the economic vitality of that region.

== Product ==
The Eraser Company develops, manufactures and sells a variety of wire, tube and cable cutting machines for many industries, including the electric motor, automotive, wire harness, medical device, telecommunications and aerospace/avionics industries. The machines include wire and cable processing and handling products such as reeler/dereelers, winders, straighteners, cutters, twisters, and strippers. Other products include infrared heating equipment, fiberglass brushes and erasers and measuring equipment.

Branding and corporate divisions include the Rush Eraser, Power Brush wire wheels, Glo-Ring infrared tools, Lux Therm infrared lamps, Remarcable coaxial cable stripping tools, and Wybar component lead forming (now obsolete).
