= Asma (given name) =

Asma (Arabic: أسماء, romanized: ʾAsmāʾ) is a feminine given name of Arabic origin meaning “supreme”. Esma is a Bosnian and Turkish variant. It is in use in the Arab world and Muslim-majority countries. Notable people with the given name include: Asma al-Assad, former First Lady of Syria and wife of former president, Bashar al-Assad.

== Historical ==
- Asmā' bint Abu Bakr (c.595 – 692 CE), companion of the Islamic prophet Mohammed and elder sister of his wife Aisha
- Asma bint Atta, was the wife of Abbasid caliph al-Mahdi (r. 775–785) until her divorce after a few months.
- Asma bint Abd al-Rahman ibn al-Harith, was the prominent member clan of Banu Makhzum and mother-in-law of Umayyad prince Abd al-Aziz.
- Asma bint Khumarawayh, better known as Qatr al-Nada (died 900), was the wife of Abbasid caliph al-Mu'tadid (r. 892–902).
- Asma bint Marwan, 7th century Arabian Jewish female poet

== 20th–21st century ==
- Asma Sultana (born 1977), Bangladeshi designer and fashion entrepreneur
- Asma Afsaruddin (born 1958), American academic
- Asma Ben Ahmed, Tunisian singer
- Asma al-Assad (born 1975), former First Lady of Syria
- Asma al-Ghul (born 1982), Palestinian feminist journalist
- Asma Al-Rayyan, Qatari royal and human rights activist
- Asma Al Thani, Qatari royal and mountaineer
- Asma Barlas (born 1950), American academic
- Asma Gull Hasan (born 1974), Pakistani-American award-winning writer
- Asma Jahangir (1952–2018), Pakistani lawyer
- Asma Khatun (1934/35-2025), Bangladeshi politician
- Asma Othmani, Tunisian singer
- Asma Tubi (1905–1983), Palestinian writer

== See also ==
- Aasmah Mir (born 1971), Scottish television and radio broadcaster and journalist
