= Auticon =

IT company that employs autistic people

auticon
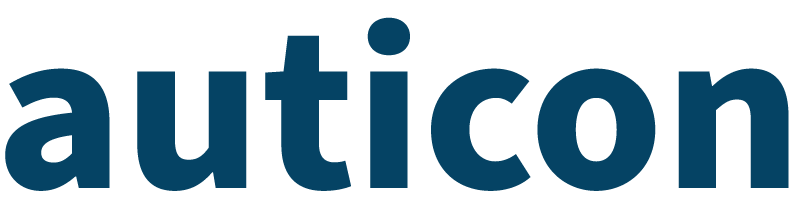
- Type: Private
- Industry: IT Consultancy
- Founded: 2011 (auticon) / 2009 (unicus)
- Founder: Dirk Müller-Remus (auticon) Lars Johansson-Kjellerød (Unicus)
- Number of locations: 15 countries (2024)
- Area served: Europe; United States; Canada; Australia
- Key people: Luke Williams OBE (Group CEO) Lars Johansson-Kjellerød (Founder Unicus & Group CFO); Meeta Thareja (Group COO) Dieter Hahn (CEO Germany, Member of Management Board)
- Services: Artificial Intelligence & Machine Learning; Business Analytics; Business Intelligence; Cybersecurity; Data Analysis; Data Engineering; Data Science; DEI Consultancy Services (Neuroinclusion); Individual Coaching; Neuroinclusion Advisory Services; Neuroinclusion Maturity Assessments; Quality Assurance; Software Development; Software Testing; Training(Neuroinclusion)
- Number of employees: 552
- Website: auticon.com

Auticon (stylised as auticon) is an international information technology consulting company and social enterprise that employs autistic adults as consultants. Founded in Berlin in 2011, the company has expanded internationally through organic growth and the acquisitions of American company MindSpark and Canadian company Meticulon. In 2023, Auticon and the Nordic consultancy Unicus announced a merger agreement. The company operated in 15 countries as of 2024.

== History ==
Auticon was founded in Berlin in 2011 by Dirk Müller-Remus. In October 2016, the company received investment from Richard Branson's Virgin Group and the UK charity Esmée Fairbairn Foundation to support expansion in the United Kingdom.

In June 2018, Auticon entered the United States through the acquisition of MindSpark, an IT consultancy based in Santa Monica, California.

In 2019, Auticon expanded into Canada by acquiring Meticulon's technology consulting division

In 2023, Auticon and Oslo-based firm Unicus announced a plan to merge companies.

On 1 January 2025, Luke Williams was appointed Group CEO, succeeding Kurt Schöffer, who retired on 31 December 2024.

== Business model ==
Auticon employs autistic adults as IT consultants and supports them through workplace adjustments and coaching.

In its 2024 impact report, the company reported working with 307 clients globally and employing 552 people. 79% of their workforce identified as neurodivergent. The report said that 405 autistic people were employed in technology and data roles.

The company's employment approach has been discussed in Harvard Business Review articles on neurodiversity and disability as sources of competitive advantage.

== Awards ==
- 2013: IQ Award
- 2017: UK Social Enterprise Awards – One to Watch Award
- 2021: UK Social Enterprise Awards – International Impact (winner)
- 2022: UK Social Enterprise Awards – Social Enterprise of the Year (winner)
- 2022: UK Social Enterprise Awards – Social Enterprise Building Diversity, Inclusion, Equity and Justice (winner)

== See also ==
- Neurodiversity
- Autism rights movement
- Social enterprise
- Autism and employment
