= Dieter Nuhr =

German kabarett artist

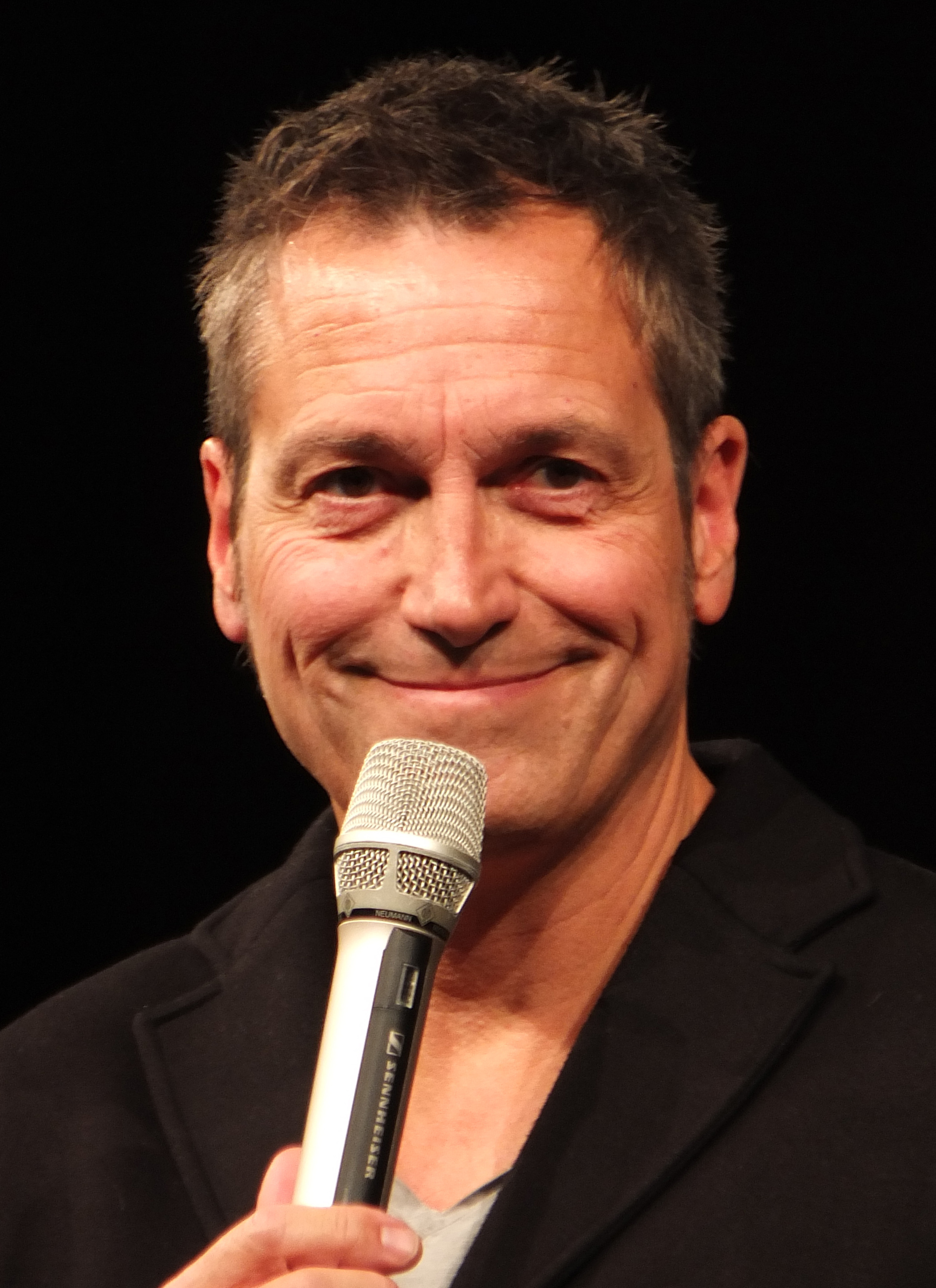
- Nuhr in 2017
- Born: Dieter Herbert Nuhr; 29 October 1960 (age 66); Wesel, West Germany
- Occupations: Kabarett artist, comedian, author, television presenter
- Website: nuhr.de

Dieter Herbert Nuhr (born 29 October 1960) is a German kabarett artist, comedian, author and television presenter.

Nuhr's stage program nuhr in Berlin (the title is a pun; for explanation, see below) is the first German stand-up comedy which was created exclusively for Netflix.

Nuhr is one of the most successful cabaret artists in Germany, with more than 200.000 viewers per year. Nuhr is regarded as a mediator between classical comedy and intelligent stand-up comedy. In his work, he gives a critical glance to social behaviour in society and media, often satirising relationships and families. Nuhr has also been known to caricature the typical German know-it-all.

A saying of Nuhr is frequently quoted in forums and newsgroups due to its provocative nature (and use of the semi-offensive word Fresse): "Wenn man keine Ahnung hat: Einfach mal Fresse halten", which roughly translates to, "If you haven't got a clue: Just shut up."

== Early life and education ==
Nuhr was born in Wesel but his family moved to Düsseldorf when he was four years old. Growing up he attended the secondary school Leibniz-Gymnasium.

In 1981 he started to study art and history at the University of Duisburg-Essen and received his teaching degree in 1988. From 1981 to 1989, Nuhr studied art and history at the Folkwang Hochschule in Essen.

== Career ==
His first appearance on stage was with a school theater group where he also started to write his first own texts. In 1986, he and Frank Küster founded the cabaret-duo V.E.V.-K.Barett. Their first official appearance on stage was part of their program called "Haben Sie sich ihre Schranknummer gemerkt?", which can be translated as "Have you memorized your locker-number?". In 1987, he appeared for the first time as a cabaretist. In 1989, the duo developed their second stage program "Pralle Pracht" (lit. bulging opulence) and after a name change in 1990 to V.E.V.Kabarett the duo performed their third stage program "Schrille Stille" (lit. sharp silence). The last project of the group called "Zipfeltreffen", which is a play on words in German (Gipfeltreffen = summit conference whereas Zipfeltreffen = summit of dicks), followed. In 1994, Nuhr started his first solo-project called "Nuhr am Nörgeln". (This program title contains, like most of Nuhr's titles, two different meanings. It could be literally translated as "just grumbling" or as "Mr. Nuhr is grumbling" because the German word "nur", meaning "just", is homophonic to Nuhr's last name.) From 1982 to 1992, he was an active artist, and several of his works were exhibited in the Rhineland. He has since gained notoriety for his numerous television appearances on Die Harald Schmidt Show, Genial daneben, Schillerstraße, Quatsch Comedy Club (Channel Pro7) and 7 Tage, 7 Köpfe (lit. 7 days, 7 heads) on the channel RTL.

In an interview with the newspaper Westdeutsche Zeitung in 2006, Nuhr was asked how he had developed his unique style: "I started my solo career because the manager of a theater in Mönchengladbach had talked me into it. He allowed me to perform on his stage and directed me. While I was practicing my program more and more requisites went missing because he took more and more of them away. So when the day of my first performance came close there were no requisites left anymore. I just stood there and talked to the audience. This is how my very own style was born. At first I thought that this could not work at all, but the fewer requisites I used, the better it finally worked out for me. So I thought that this is what I should do: not use any requisites but talk to the audience in my own way." (28 January 2006).

In 1998, the stage program "Nuhr weiter so" (lit. "Simply go on") received an award: the Deutsche Kleinkunstpreis in the category cabaret and in 2003, he received the Deutscher Comedypreis (German comedy award) for best live performance, making him the only person who received both of these well-known German awards.

His performance "Ich bin's Nuhr" was visited by approximately half a million people. After presenting a humorous review of the year's events in 2004, he has been broadcast on ZDF with a similar TV show at the end of every following year. Nuhr presented the German comedy award for the first time on 24 October 2008 and did so over the course of the following five years. Since 3 October 2009 his four-part comedy series has been shown live on ZDF on four Tuesday evenings.

In 2009, Nuhr was asked whether he would like to participate in the album "A Tribute to Die Fantastischen Vier" for the 20th anniversary of the group Die Fantastischen Vier. It is a compilation album with varied artists covering songs of the hip hop group from Stuttgart. Nuhr recorded the song "Buenos Dias Messias" in his office room. In this song he played all the instruments himself and recorded it with his equipment, which he uses for radio shows otherwise. In addition to that, the album includes a conversation between Nuhr and the initiator of the album project Andreas "Bär" Läsker.

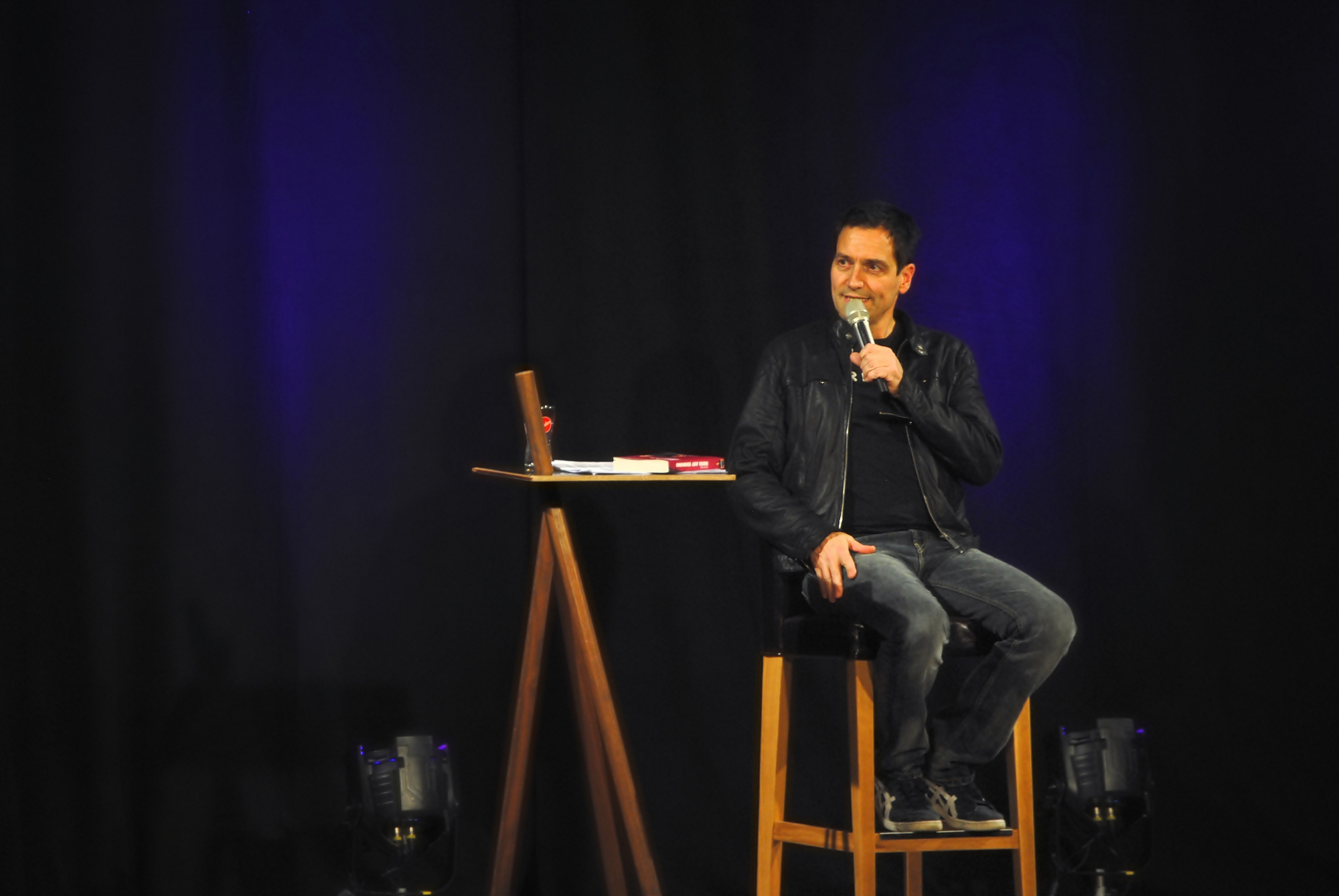
Nuhr live in 2011

From 20 January 2011 until 2014, he presented the TV show "Satire Gipfel" on ARD. He replaced Mathias Richling, whose contract ended in 2010. In October 2014, this TV format was replaced by "Nuhr im Ersten" which was presented by him as well. Nuhr produced a two-part TV special concerning the 2010 FIFA World Cup. In doing so he referred to the topic soccer in an ironical way. Furthermore, he produced weekly cabaret segments for the radio station WDR 2. Together with Ralph Casper he presented the quiz show "Null gewinnt" in the early evening time slot of ARD from July to March 2013. In the year 2012, Dieter Nuhr was mentor for the "ARD-Themenwoche" (a special TV format, covering a weekly particular topic) with an emphasis on the topic: living with death. To this TV format he contributed the television show "Nuhr am Leben" which was recorded in the St. Elisabeth church in Berlin Mitte and broadcast on ARD on 19 November 2012. In 2013, he took part in the "ARD-Themenwoche" again, when the topic "fortunately/I'm glad that..." was concerned. His broadcast "Nuhr im Glück" was recorded in the orangery of the tropical Botanical Garden, Potsdam and was aired on 22 November 2013.

The ARD-Themenwoche 2014 will be about tolerance and Nuhr will perform his stage program "Nuhr mit Respekt" (Only with respect) and will be broadcast from the Jewish museum Berlin. Nuhr can also be seen regularly on the TV show "Mario Barth deckt auf!" in which he and the German comedian Mario Barth show examples of projects which only wasted tax money. In 2014, Nuhr received the Jacob-Grimm-Award. The Jury praised Nuhrs way of performing and his intelligent form of cabaret. His stage programs were eloquent and his punch lines hit. Though the main aspect of his work was not the extraordinary quality of his speeches but also his ability to perform critique with and through language and the way Nuhr invites the audience to think about how language is able to influence our thoughts and emotions.

Nuhr's stage program nuhr in Berlin (the title is a pun on nur which is German for only) is the first German stand-up comedy which was created exclusively for Netflix. On 15 November 2016, it became available on Netflix in several countries (optionally with subtitles), including the United States and the United Kingdom.

Nuhr was one of the first signers of the Open Letter to the German Position on Russo-Ukraining War on late April 2022, who demanded not to support Ukraine with arms in order to "prevent a third world war".

== Islamic cabaret controversy ==
Dieter Nuhr is one of the few German cabaret artists who deals with the topic of radical sides of Islam in his programmes and books. In October 2014, a suspected Salafist pressed charges against Nuhr because he was allegedly insulting creeds and religious communities. Erhat Toka (board member of the former Muslimisch Demokratischen Union – MDU, now Bündnis für Innovation und Gerechtigkeit (BIG)) initiated the process and denoted Nuhr to be a hatemonger who agitates against Islam and invoked people to boycott Nuhr's event in Osnabrück. The Islamic scholar Bülent Ucar of the University of Osnabrück argued that Nuhr uses generalizations, feeds prejudice and brings himself up to tendentious interpretations of the Koran. The emeritus professor of theology Reinhold Mokrosch who is also speaker of the Round Table of the Religions could understand the criticism of Nuhr since he felt that it encouraged Islamophobia. Aiman Mazyek, chairman of the non-representative Central Council of Muslims in Germany was also upset about Nuhr's utterances but advised to keep calm. Mazyek declared: "If Mr. Nuhr thinks he can interpret the Koran in a fundamentalist way for the sake of satire then he has to take responsibility for this. However, it is not worth suing him and thus giving him free advertising."

Lawyer Klaus Staeck, recent president of the Academy of Arts, Berlin, said at the time he did not expect the complaint against Nuhr would be successful, and believed Nuhr only exercised his freedom of opinion, which is taken seriously by German courts. Nuhr objected to the accusation that he would be stirring up hatred against Islam. He told Neue Osnabrücker Zeitung he would continue discussing the dangers of radical Islam. He is not interested in insulting Muslims, but still wants to deal critically with Islam, he told the Welt am Sonntag. The cabaret artist warned of not publicly criticizing Islam just because of fearing the possible reactions and to not leave the protest only to the right-wingers. Nuhr, on his part, criticized the report of the Neue Osnabrücker Zeitung, which related the term "hate preacher-image" to Nuhr in their online issue. The Tagesspiegel cited Nuhr's entry from his Facebook site: "Been accused as "hate preacher" by Islamists because I quoted the Quran correctly. Please come visit me in jail! Neue Osnabrücker Zeitung only asks for the opinion of the Islamists and shows understanding. The question is: Does a country, that has that kind of newspapers, even need Islamists?"

Richard Herzinger commented that there were some concerns and that the complaint would especially harm the image of Muslims. On 5 November 2014, the Prosecution Office of Osnabrück announced that the proceedings against Nuhr would be closed. The prosecution justified this with the lack of "xenophobic sentiment" in the works of Dieter Nuhr as well as the circumstance, that it obviously is satire.

== Political statements ==
In 2020, Nuhr signed the "Appeal for Free Debate Spaces" („Appell für freie Debattenräume“) together with right-wing conservatives Peter Hahne, Vera Lengsfeld and others. The declaration was directed against a supposed "cancel culture" in German society.

== Awards ==
- 1998: Deutscher Kleinkunstpreis
- 2000: Bayerischer Kabarettpreis (Bavarian Cabaret Awards) and Morenhovener Lupe
- 2003: Deutscher Comedy-Preis: Bester Liveact (German Comedy-Prize: best Live Act)
- 2008: IQ Award
- 2009/10: Deutscher Comedy-Preis: Bester Komiker (German Comedy-Prize: best comedian)
- 2004: Eselorden award of the town Wesel
- 2006: Zeck-Kabarettpreis
- 2007: Nordrhein-Westfälischer Kleinkunstpreis „Bocholter Pepperoni“
- 2008: Deutscher IQ-Preis of the society Mensa in Deutschland
- 2009: Deutscher Comedypreis: best comedian
- 2010: Deutscher Comedypreis: best comedian
- 2011: Health Media Award for the programme Nuhr unter uns
- 2012: Krefelder Krähe award
- 2014: Jacob-Grimm-Preis Deutsche Sprache
- 2014: Special award of the journal Querdenker
- 2015: Deutscher Comedypreis: best comedian
- 2016: Münchhausen-Preis
- 2016: Deutscher Comedypreis: best comedian
- 2017: Verdienstorden des Landes Nordrhein-Westfalen
- 2026: The Leo Baeck Prize, for his stance against antisemitism

== Personal life ==
As of 2010, Nuhr lives in Ratingen, North Rhine-Westphalia.

== Productions ==
=== CD albums ===
Since "nur" means only, simply or just in German, the titles of his stand-up programs and CDs often involve puns.

- Nuhr am Nörgeln, lit. Nuhr grousing or Just grousing (1994)
- Nuhr weiter so, lit. Nuhr, go on or Just going on (1996)
- Nuhr nach vorn, lit. Nuhr, go ahead or Just going ahead (1998)
- www.nuhr.de (2000)
- www.nuhr.de/2 (2002)
- Ich bin's Nuhr, lit. It's me, Nuhr or It's just me (2004)
- Nuhr die Wahrheit, lit. Nuhr the truth or Only the truth (2007)
- Nuhr die Ruhe, lit. Nuhr the calmness or Stay calm (2009)

=== DVDs ===
- Quatsch Comedy Club 1&2
- Nuhr vom Feinsten, lit. The Best of Nuhr or Only the best (2004)
- Ich bin's nuhr, lit. It's me, Nuhr or It's just me (2006)

=== Books ===
- Gibt es intelligentes Leben? lit. Does intelligent life exist ?
- Wer's glaubt, wird selig lit. Don't you believe it!

== Literature ==
- "Dieter Nuhr erklimmt den 'Satire Gipfel'" [Dieter Nuhr reaches 'satire peak']. Spiegel Online (in German). 28 September 2010.
