= Judita Cofman =

Yugoslav mathematician

Judita Cofman (1936–2001) was a Yugoslav-German mathematician, the first person to earn a doctorate in mathematics at the University of Novi Sad. She was known for her work in finite geometry and for her books aimed at young mathematicians.

== Early life and education ==
Cofman was born on 4 June 1936 to a prominent ethnically German but Hungarian-speaking family (variously spelled Cofman or Zoffmann) in Vršac, then in Yugoslavia and now part of Serbia. Her father was a brewer, but the family brewery (founded in 1859) was closed by the occupying Germans in World War II and then nationalized by the newly-established communist government of Yugoslavia in 1946. Her grandfather was a mathematics teacher, and her uncle was the town mayor. Growing up in Vršac, Cofman learned Hungarian, Serbian, German, Russian, English, and later French and Italian; her facility with languages became useful for her mathematics studies.

In 1954, she joined the first cohort of mathematics students in the Faculty of Philosophy in Novi Sad, now part of the University of Novi Sad. She finished her studies there in 1958 and became a high school mathematics teacher in Zrenjanin. She returned to Novi Sad (newly founded as a university) in 1960, as an assistant to geometer Mileva Prvanović and in the same year was responsible for the university's first mathematics publication, of her lecture notes on straightedge and compass constructions. She traveled to Rome in 1961 to work with Lucio Lombardo-Radice then, returning to Novi Sad in 1963, defended her Ph.D., the first mathematical doctorate at Novi Sad. Her dissertation was O konačnim nedezargovim ravnima generisanim četvorotemenikom [Finite Non-Desarguesian Planes Generated by Quadrangles].

== Career ==
After completing her doctorate, Cofman did postdoctoral research as a Humboldt Fellow at Goethe University Frankfurt. She became a lecturer at Imperial College London in 1965 and then, after a year visiting the University of Perugia, took a position at the University of Tübingen in Germany.

In the mid-1970s she moved to Johannes Gutenberg University Mainz, at a time when her interests began to shift as well, from finite geometry to mathematics education. At Mainz, she became the doctoral advisor of mathematics popularizer Albrecht Beutelspacher, through whom she has many academic descendants. She left the university in 1978, and became a mathematics teacher at Putney High School in London from 1978 to 1993. It was during this time that she wrote her books for young mathematicians.

In 1993 she returned to German academia as a professor of mathematics education at the University of Erlangen–Nuremberg. She retired from Erlangen and moved to the University of Debrecen, in Hungary, in 2001, but died on 19 December 2001, shortly after starting her new position there.

== Books ==
Cofman was the author of:

- Problems for Young Mathematicians (Pullen, 1981)
- What to Solve?: Problems and Suggestions for Young Mathematicians (Clarendon Press, 1990)
- Numbers and Shapes Revisited: More Problems for Young Mathematicians (Clarendon Press, 1995)
- Einblicke in die Geschichte der Mathematik [Insights into the History of Mathematics] (Two volumes, Spektrum, 1999 and 2001)
