= IQ Award =

Mensa International award

The IQ Award is a prize donated by the high-IQ association Mensa to honor people and organisations who have made remarkable contributions to public welfare by an intelligent idea, scientific research about human intelligence or the positive image of intelligence in the public. Candidates can be nominated by Mensa members and former award winners. After being checked by an internal commission, all Mensa members can vote for which nominee to win the award.

== History ==
The German IQ Award is held annually since 2004. The winners are:

- 2004: Albrecht Beutelspacher for his Mathematikum
- 2005: Günther Jauch for his TV show "Der Große IQ-Test" (The big IQ test)
- 2006: Die Sendung mit der Maus, a children's TV series
- 2007: Ranga Yogeshwar, a German TV host
- 2008: Dieter Nuhr, a comedian
- 2009: Harald Lesch, an astrophysicist and TV host
- 2010: Spektrum der Wissenschaft, the German issue of Scientific American

Since 2011 the award is issued in the two categories: "Wissenschaft/Innovation" (Science/Innovation) and "Kultur/Medien" (Culture/Media):

- 2011: Heatball and Richard David Precht
- 2012: Eckart von Hirschhausen and due to the same number of votes Franz Porzsolt and Florian Freistetter for ScienceBlogs
- 2013: Auticon
- 2014: Jonny Lee Miller. Initially Edward Snowden had been nominated by Mensa members, and the IQ commission had approved his nomination, the managing board of Mensa revoked Snowden's nomination because "Mensa is not allowed to comment on political issues." Jonny Lee Miller then garnered the most votes and won the award.
- 2015: Category 1 (Intelligent contributions to the Greater Good): foodsharing.de, Category 2 (Intelligent Dissemination of Knowledge): Daniele Ganser, Category 3 (Intellectual Giftedness in the Public): Initiative ArbeiterKind.
- 2017: Category 1 (Intelligent contributions to the Greater Good): One Dollar Glasses Category 2 (Intelligent Dissemination of Knowledge): ScienceLab
