= Albrecht Beutelspacher =

German mathematician (born 1950)

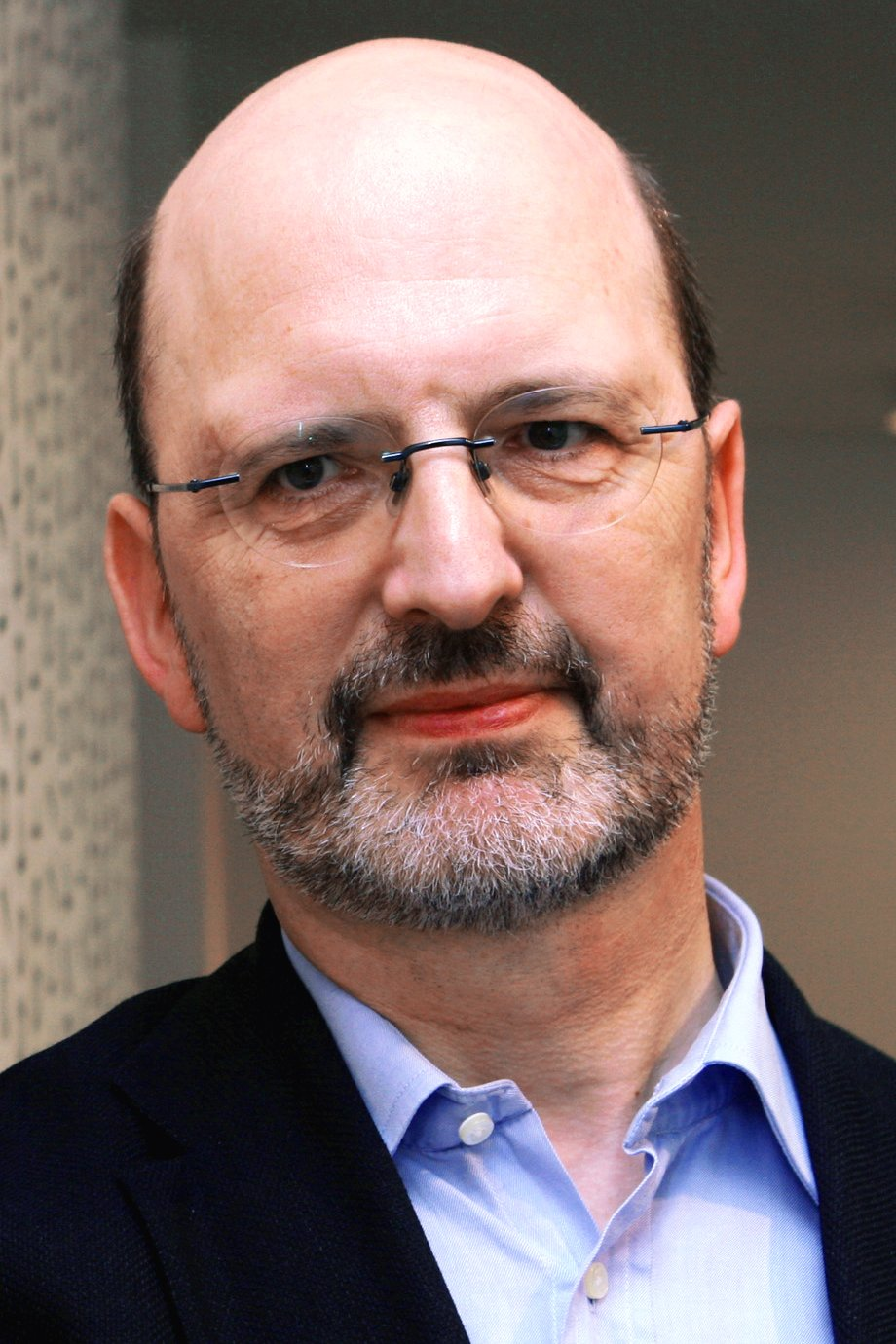
Albrecht Beutelspacher (2007)

Albrecht Beutelspacher (born 5 June 1950) is a German mathematician and founder of the Mathematikum. He is a professor emeritus at the University of Giessen, where he held the chair for geometry and discrete mathematics from 1988 to 2018.

== Biography ==
Beutelspacher studied from 1969 to 1973 math, physics and philosophy at the University of Tübingen and received his PhD 1976 from the University of Mainz. His PhD advisor was Judita Cofman. From 1982 to 1985 he was an associate professor at the University of Mainz and from 1985 to 1988 he worked at a research department of Siemens. From 1988 to 2018 he was a tenured professor for geometry and discrete mathematics at the University of Giessen. He became a well-known popularizer of mathematics in Germany by authoring several books in the field of popular science and recreational math and by founding Germany's first math museum, the Mathematikum. He received several awards for his contributions to popularizing mathematics. He had a math column in the German popular science magazine Bild der Wissenschaft and moderated a popular math series for the TV Channel BR-$\alpha$ (educational TV).

== Awards ==
- 2004: IQ Award
- 2008: Hessian Cultural Prize
- 2016 Hessian Order of Merit

== Books ==
=== regular ===
- Einführung in die endliche Geometrie. Band 1: Blockpläne. Bibliographisches Institut Wissenschaftsverlag, Mannheim u. a. 1982, ISBN 3-411-01632-9.
- Einführung in die endliche Geometrie. Band 2: Projektive Räume. Bibliographisches Institut Wissenschaftsverlag, Mannheim u. a. 1983, ISBN 3-411-01648-5.
- Cryptology. Spectrum
- with Lynn Batten: The Theory of finite linear Spaces. Cambridge University Press, 1993
- with Uta Rosenbaum: Projective Geometry: From Foundations to Applications. Cambridge University Press
- „Das ist o.B.d.A. trivial!“ Eine Gebrauchsanleitung zur Formulierung mathematischer Gedanken mit vielen praktischen Tips für Studenten der Mathematik und Informatik. Vieweg, Braunschweig u. a. 1991, ISBN 3-528-06442-0 (9th edition, Vieweg + Teubner, Wiesbaden 2009, ISBN 978-3-8348-0771-7).
- Lineare Algebra. Eine Einführung in die Wissenschaft der Vektoren, Abbildungen und Matrizen. 8th edition, Springer Spektrum, Wiesbaden 2014, ISBN 978-3-658-02412-3, doi:10.1007/978-3-658-02413-0.
- with Bernhard Petri: Der goldene Schnitt. 2. Auflage. Spektrum, Heidelberg, Berlin, Oxford 1996, ISBN 3-86025-404-9
- mit Jörg Schwenk und Klaus-Dieter Wolfenstetter: Moderne Verfahren der Kryptographie. Von RSA zu Zero-Knowledge. Vieweg, Braunschweig u. a. 1995, ISBN 3-528-06590-7 (7., überarbeitete Auflage. Vieweg + Teubner, Wiesbaden 2010, ISBN 978-3-8348-1228-5).
- with Marc-Alexander Zschiegner: Diskrete Mathematik für Einsteiger. Mit Anwendungen in Technik und Informatik. Vieweg, Braunschweig u. a. 2002, ISBN 3-528-06989-9 (4., aktualisierte Auflage. Vieweg + Teubner, Wiesbaden 2011, ISBN 978-3-8348-1248-3).
- with Heike B. Neumann und Thomas Schwarzpaul: Kryptographie in Theorie und Praxis. Mathematische Grundlagen für elektronisches Geld, Internetsicherheit und Mobilfunk. Vieweg + Teubner, Braunschweig und Wiesbaden 2005, ISBN 3-528-03168-9.
- Survival-Kit Mathematik. Mathe-Basics zum Studienbeginn. Vieweg + Teubner, Wiesbaden 2010, ISBN 978-3-8348-1258-2.

=== popular science ===
- Pasta all´infinito. Meine italienische Reise in die Mathematik. 2. Auflage. C.H. Beck, München 2000, ISBN 3-406-45404-6
- Luftschlösser und Hirngespinste. Vieweg, Braunschweig und Wiesbaden 1986
- Geheimsprachen. Geschichte und Techniken. 3. Auflage. C.H. Beck, München 2002, ISBN 3-406-49046-8
- In Mathe war ich immer schlecht. 3. Auflage. Vieweg, Braunschweig und Wiesbaden 2001, ISBN 3-528-26783-6
- Christian und die Zahlenkünstler. Eine Reise in die wundersame Welt der Mathematik. C.H. Beck, München 2005, ISBN 3-406-52708-6
- Albrecht Beutelspachers Kleines Mathematikum. Die 101 wichtigsten Fragen und Antworten zur Mathematik, C.H. Beck, Munich 2010, ISBN 978-3-406-60202-3
- with Marcus Wagner: Warum Kühe gern im Halbkreis grasen. ... und andere mathematische Knobeleien. Herder, Freiburg (Breisgau) 2010, ISBN 978-3-451-30226-8.
- Zahlen. Geschichte, Gesetze, Geheimnisse. C.H.Beck, München 2013, ISBN 978-3-406-64871-7
- Wie man in eine Seifenblase schlüpft. C.H.Beck, München 2015, ISBN 978-3-406-68135-6.
- with Marcus Wagner: Wie man einen Würfel aufpustet. Herder, Freiburg (Breisgau) 2019, ISBN 978-3-451-60068-5
- Null, unendlich und die wilde 13. Die wichtigsten Zahlen und ihre Geschichte. C.H.Beck, München 2020, ISBN 978-3-406-74967-4
