= Mathematikum =

Coordinates: 50°34′52″N 8°39′57″E

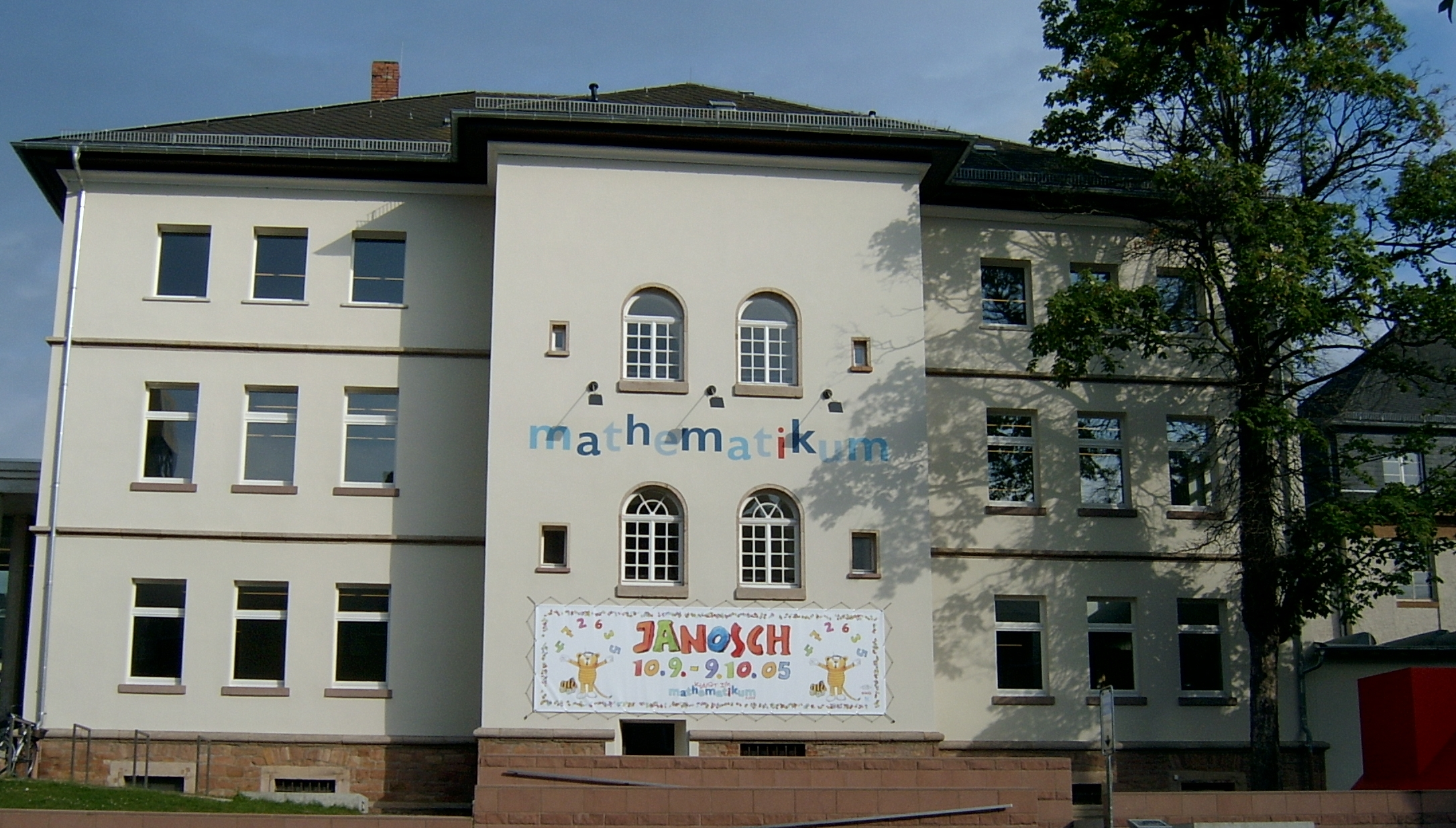
- The building as seen from the western entrance.
- Established: 19 November 2002
- Location: Gießen
- Type: Museum of mathematics
- Visitors: 150,051 annually
- Director: Albrecht Beutelspacher
- Public transit access: Bus lines: 2;5;520 at Liebigstrasse bus stop, Giessen main train station nearby
- Website: www.mathematikum.de

The Mathematikum is a science museum, located in Gießen, Germany, which offers a huge variety of mathematical hands-on exhibits. It was founded by Albrecht Beutelspacher, a German mathematician.

The Mathematikum opened its doors to visitors on 19 November 2002. It was inaugurated by the German president Johannes Rau. Since then, the museum has attracted more than 2,500,000 visitors. Annually the museum is visited by more than 150,000 people. The museum is opened every day of the week, excluding Sunday and Monday.

== Concept ==
The purpose of the Mathematikum is to let people of any age, gender and any qualification learn mathematics by personal experience, rather than teaching it using formulae or equations and hardly ever numbers and symbols. The visitors can therefore learn, by participating in more than 150 interactive exhibits in the museum and by gathering, a different mathematical experience from each of the exhibits.

== Exhibits ==
Mathematical experiments include mirrors, a Leonardo bridge, soap films, and puzzles. Once every month on a Tuesday, a mathematician is invited. The mathematician is interviewed by professor Beutelspacher on Beutelspachers Sofa (Beutelspacher's Couch). At the end of the interview the audience can talk to the guest and ask them questions.

== Awards ==
- 2004: IQ Award

== See also ==
Popular mathematics
