= Esma Sultan =

Esma Sultan is the name of three daughters of three Ottoman Sultans:

- Esma Sultan (daughter of Ahmed III) (1726–1788)
- Esma Sultan (daughter of Abdul Hamid I) (1778–1848)
- Esma Sultan (daughter of Abdülaziz) (1873–1899)
