= Heatball =

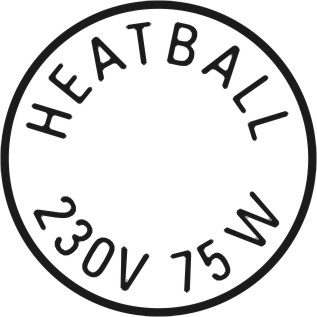
Brand stamp

Heatball is a brand name for an incandescent lamp. The brand was used as part of a scheme by Siegfried Rotthäuser, a mechanical engineer from Essen in Germany, to stimulate discussion of EU Regulation 244/2009. This Regulation forbade the importation or sale of light sources with energy efficiency worse than 'Class C' after September 2012 as part of the phase-out of incandescent light bulbs.

The scheme's declared purpose was to sell incandescent lamps as small heating elements for winter, or for use in chicken coops. The scheme was covered by several members of the international press.

== History ==
In April 2010, two brothers Rudolf and Siegfried Rotthäuser Hannot started selling incandescent lamps over the Internet. They referred to them as Heatballs and sold each as small heating device with a price of €1.69. Thirty cents per unit sold would be donated to a project to protect the rain forest, which, according to Rotthäuser, would benefit the climate more than the ban. Within a few days, the initial stock of 4,000 units was sold out and orders of 40,000 units outstanding. The second batch was ordered but the shipment was held back on 16 November 2010 by the customs officials at Cologne Airport.

== Awards ==
- 2011: IQ Award

== See also ==
- Easy-Bake Oven, a toy that originally used incandescent lamps as the heat source.
