= Incandescent light bulb ban =

Regulations banning sale of incandescent light bulbs

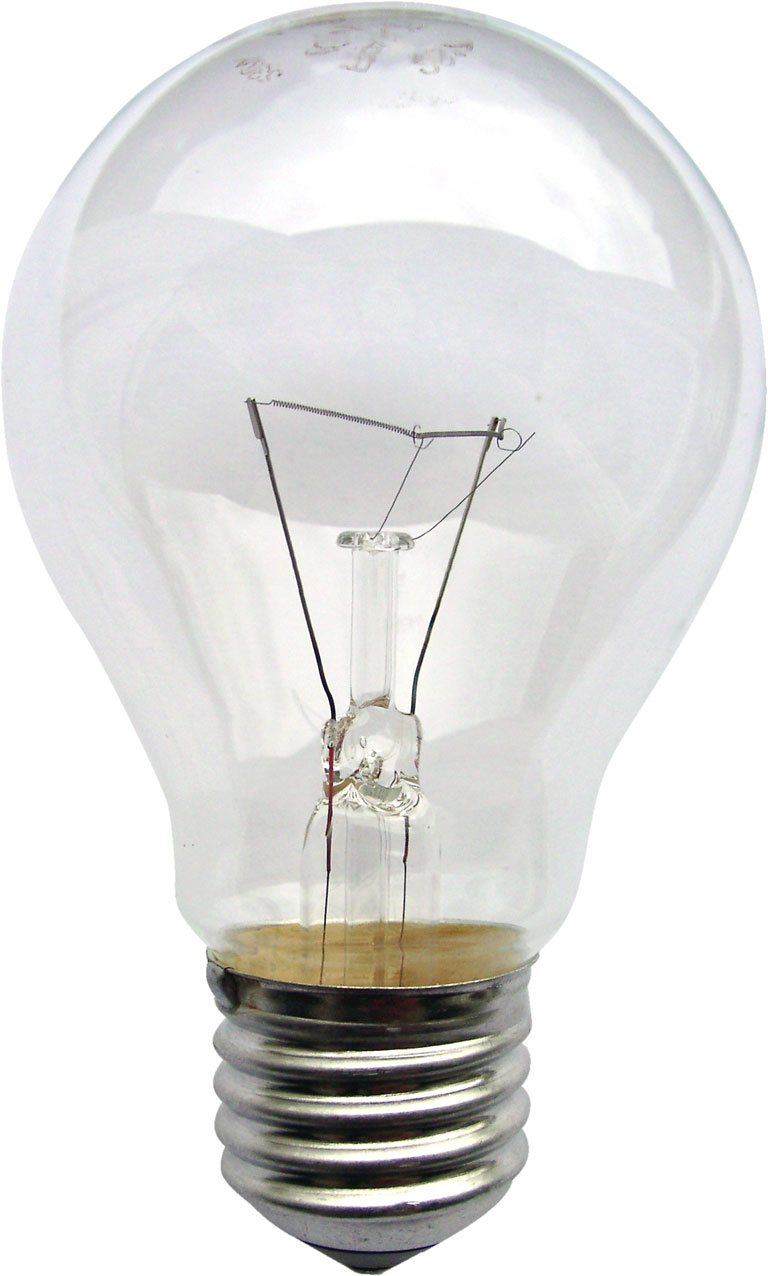
60 W incandescent light bulb with energy efficiency class E

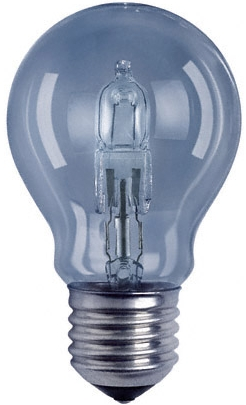
Equivalent 42 W halogen incandescent light bulb with efficiency class C

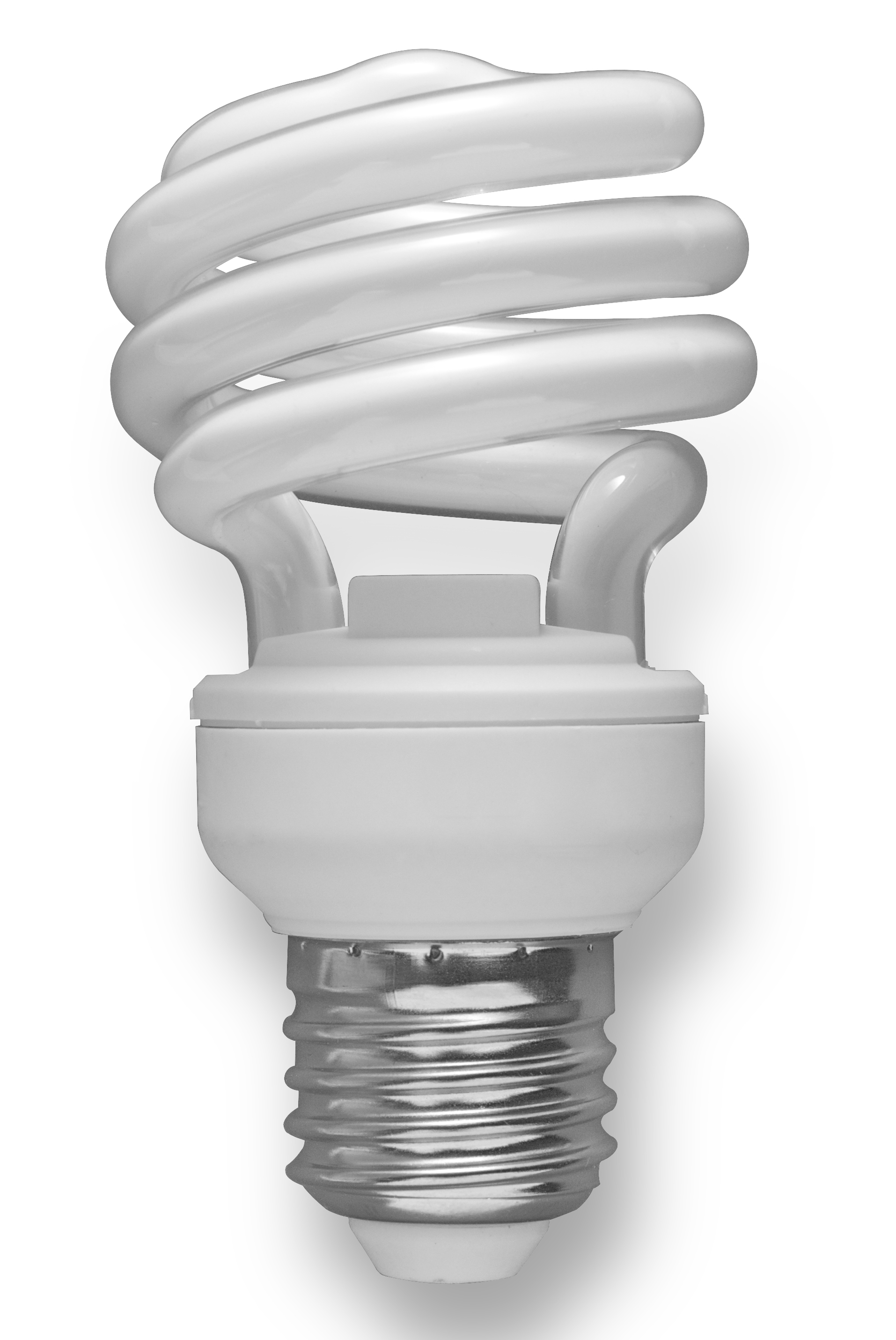
Compact fluorescent lamp

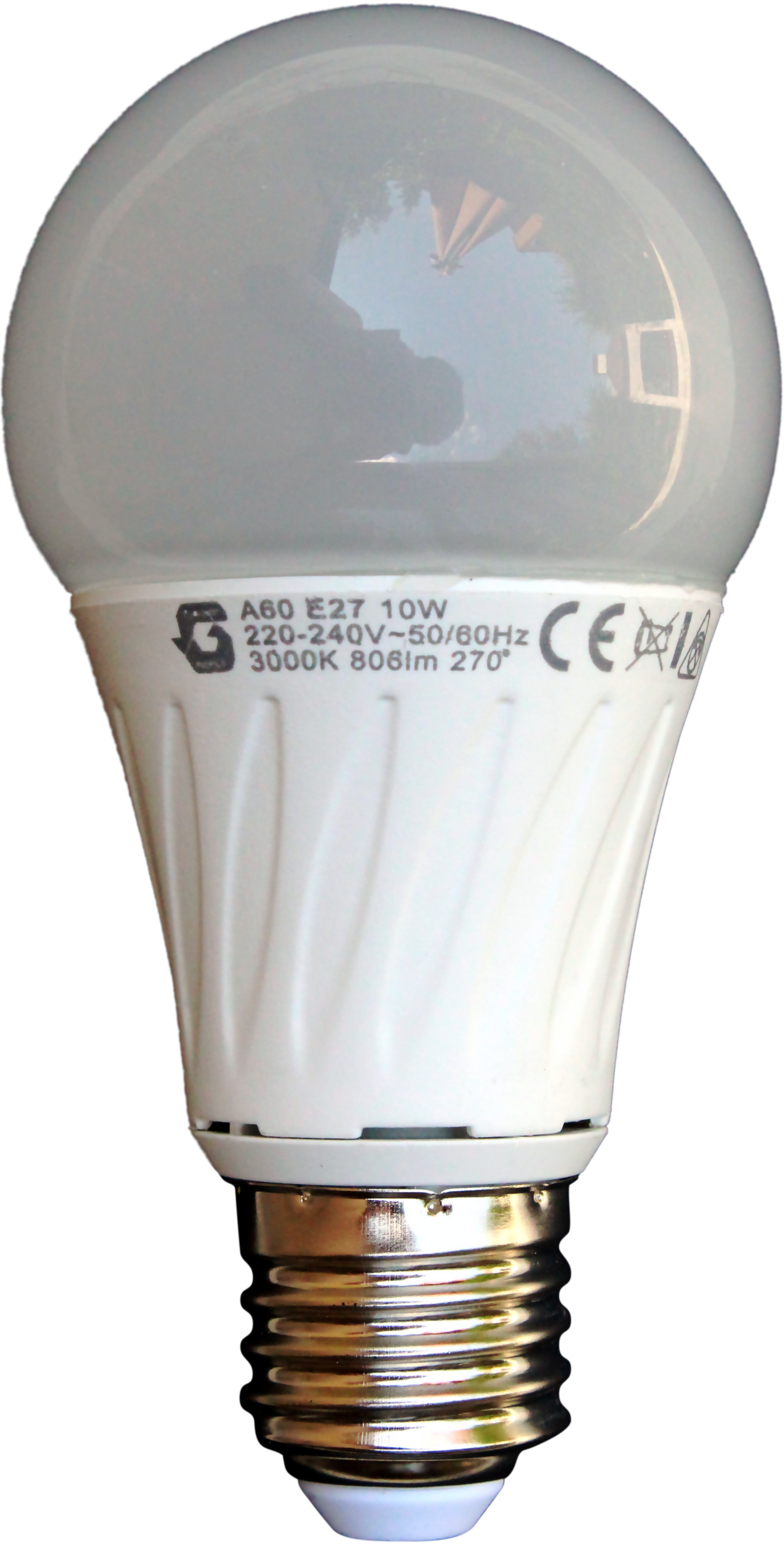
LED lamp circa 2021

Incandescent light bulb bans have been enacted by several governments that prohibit the manufacture or importation of incandescent light bulbs for general lighting in favor of more energy-efficient alternatives. The regulations are generally based on efficiency, rather than use of incandescent technology.

In 2009, the European Union and several other nations began the process of banning incandescent bulbs. In the early to mid 2010s, the bans continued in various other nations. In 2023, the United States banned most general service incandescent lamps, but had exclusions for specific bulb implementations.

Objections to banning incandescent light bulbs include the higher initial cost of alternatives, lower quality of light of fluorescent lamps, and concerns of government overreach. Bodies such as the European Commission's Scientific Committee on Emerging and Newly Identified Health Risks, as well as some psychiatrists, have expressed concern about the health and psychological effects of fluorescent lighting and blue light, stating they disrupt sleep, circadian rhythm and melatonin production compared with incandescent bulbs. Additional objections focus on the potentially hazardous materials in some alternative lamps.

== Alternatives to incandescent bulbs ==
The light from an incandescent source is similar in character to that from a Planckian "black body" in spectral distribution, that is, the bulb, as the filament heats up, produces light at wavelengths throughout the visible spectrum. Alternative light sources use phosphors or combinations of mono-chromatic LEDs (red, blue, and green) to produce "white" light, giving significantly irregular spectral distributions that can create color casts in photography and differences of color matching when compared to incandescent light or daylight.

Halogen lamps are a type of incandescent lamp with improved efficiency over regular incandescent lamps. Though not as energy efficient as other alternatives, they are up to 40 percent more efficient than standard incandescent lamps designed for a 2000-hour life. Depending on size, voltage, and designed life, small, low-voltage halogen lamps can have 70% higher efficacy than large, line-voltage lamps. They operate at a high temperature, which may be a safety hazard in some applications.

A compact fluorescent lamp (CFL) uses a fluorescent lamp tube which is curved or folded to fit into the space of an incandescent bulb and contains a compact electronic ballast in the base of the lamp. Compared to general-service incandescent lamps giving the same amount of visible light, CFLs use one-fifth to one-third the electric power and may last eight to fifteen times longer. Newer phosphor formulations have improved the perceived color, with "soft white" CFLs judged subjectively similar to standard incandescent lamps. Objections more specifically relating to compact fluorescent light bulbs include the different quality of light produced by phosphor-based lamps compared to incandescent lamps and that compact fluorescent light bulbs contain small amounts of mercury, a potent neurotoxin, which is especially dangerous to children and pregnant women, and made more serious by the confined area into which mercury would be dispersed in the event of a breakage indoors. Environmental concerns about mercury contamination from CFLs have been raised, but they can be shown to emit less mercury into the environment overall compared to traditional incandescent bulbs, due to the significant reductions in power plant emissions. Compact fluorescent lamps start poorly when cold, and most types cannot be dimmed. A few specialty applications are unsuitable for CFLs.

Light emitting diode (LED) lamps are used for both general and special-purpose lighting. Their advantages over fluorescent bulbs include: they use less power for the same light output, they contain no mercury, they turn on instantly over a wider range of temperatures, their lifetime is less affected by cycling on and off, they have no glass to break, and they emit fewer UV rays that fade colored materials. LED lamps radiate much less heat than other technologies, and can be either multi-directional or unidirectional, eliminating the need for a mirrored reflector in the bulb or fixture. LED lamps can emit saturated colored light. Disadvantages include spectral limitations resulting from the discrete emission bands of LED phosphors and semiconductor junctions; however, this issue has been partially mitigated through various spectral-engineering strategies, such as the use of multi-phosphor blends, remote phosphor coatings, and mixed-die architectures (e.g., RGBW or violet-pump systems) designed to broaden the emission spectrum and improve color rendition. Modern evaluation methods—such as the Color Quality Scale (CQS, measured in Qf and Qg units) and the IES TM-30 metrics (including the fidelity index Rf and gamut index Rg) provide more comprehensive assessments of these improvements than the traditional Color Rendering Index (CRI, Ra). When incandescent light bulb bans began, the purchase price for LEDs was much higher than other bulbs, but it has decreased steadily over the years.

== Regional developments ==
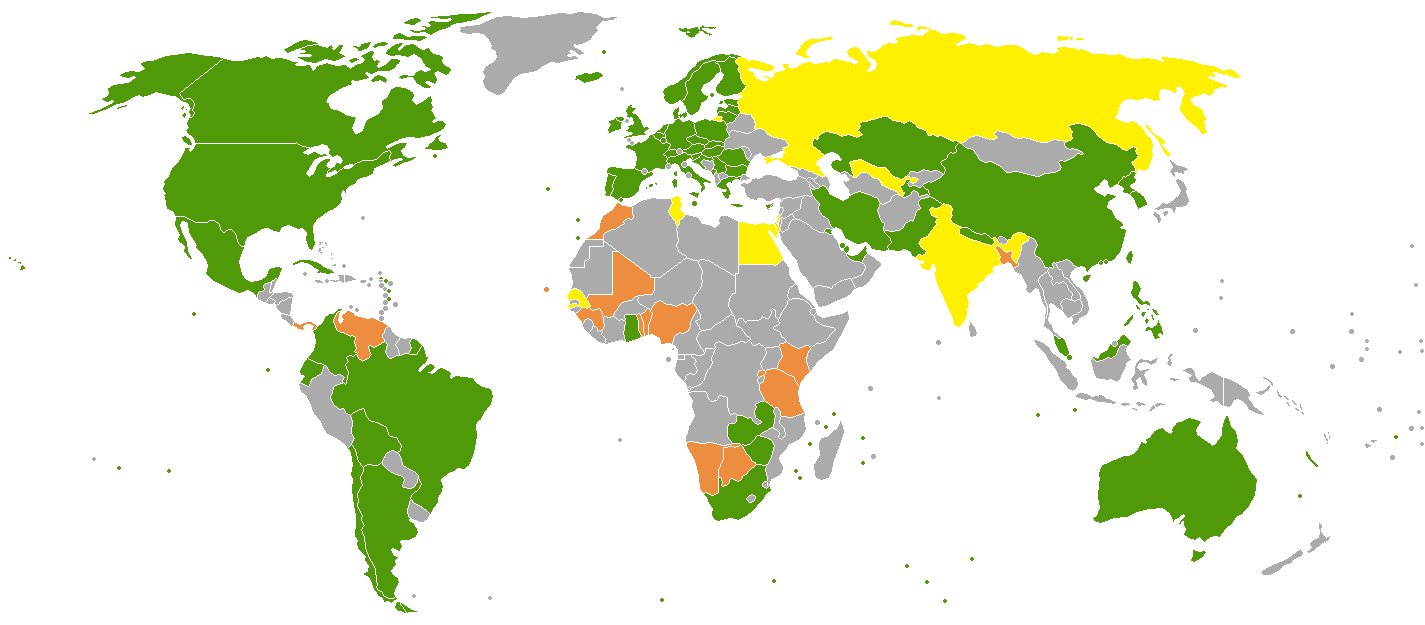
Phase out of incandescent light bulbs around the world: Full ban Partial ban Program to exchange a number of light bulbs with more efficient types

=== Africa ===
==== Botswana ====
Botswana has an exchange program distributing CFL bulbs.

==== ECOWAS ====
Of the members of ECOWAS, Cape Verde, Guinea, Mali, Nigeria, Benin and Togo have had exchange programs to replace incandescent bulbs with energy efficient versions. Ghana banned incandescent bulbs in 2008 and Senegal has banned the manufacture and import.

==== Egypt ====
Egypt is reported to have a partial ban on incandescent light bulbs.

==== Kenya ====
Kenya has a programme to exchange a number of light bulbs with more efficient types.

==== Morocco ====
Morocco has a programme to exchange a number of light bulbs with more efficient types.

==== Namibia ====
Namibia has an exchange program which distributed 1 million energy saving bulbs in 2016.

==== Rwanda ====
Rwanda has an exchange program, distributing CFL bulbs.

==== South Africa ====
South Africa phased out incandescent light bulbs in 2016.

==== Tanzania ====
Tanzania has an exchange program to replace incandescent bulbs.

==== Tunisia ====
Tunisia is reported to have a partial ban on incandescent light bulbs.

==== Zambia ====
Since January 2016, the importation of incandescent light bulbs has been banned in Zambia.

==== Zimbabwe ====
Zimbabwe has banned incandescent light bulbs.

=== Asia ===
==== Bahrain ====
Bahrain has banned incandescent light bulbs.

==== Bangladesh ====
Bangladesh has an exchange program.

==== People's Republic of China ====
Announced in 2011 China has banned imports and sales of certain incandescent light bulbs since October 2012 to encourage the use of alternative lighting sources such as light-emitting diodes (LEDs), with a 5-year plan of phasing-out incandescent light bulbs over 100 watts starting 1 October 2012, and gradually extend the ban to those over 15 watts on 1 October 2016. Another source, however, has indicated that by 1 October 2016, all incandescent light bulbs will be banned. According to this source, 1 November 2011 to 30 September 2012 will be a transitional period and as of 1 October 2012, imports and sales of ordinary incandescent bulbs of 100 watts or more will be prohibited. The first phase will be followed by a ban on 60-watt-and-higher incandescent light bulbs starting in October 2014. By October 2016, all incandescent light bulbs will be banned in China. The final phase may be adjusted according to the results of interim assessment from October 2015 to October 2016. It has been reported that the ban would be complete by October 2016.

==== India ====
While not a complete ban, the UJALA plan in India sought to replace 770 million incandescent light bulbs with LED bulbs by 2019. This was expected to reduce energy consumption by over 100 billion kWh annually and reduce annual electricity bills by ₹400 billion (US$4.3 billion). As of April 2017, 229 million LED bulbs had been distributed across the country.

The states of Tamil Nadu, Kerala and Karnataka in India have banned the use of incandescent bulbs in government departments, various boards, cooperative institutions, local bodies, and institutions running on government aid. Kerala banned incandescent bulbs in November 2020.

==== Israel ====
Phase out of 60W and over incandescent light bulbs has been implemented from 1 January 2012. As a measure to increase awareness a national awareness campaign has been initiated by the Ministry of Energy where three CFLs will be sold at a subsidized price to the public.

==== Kazakhstan ====
Kazakhstan banned all incandescent bulbs over 25 W on 1 January 2014.

==== Kuwait ====
As of 1 August 2017, Kuwait has banned the import of incandescent light bulbs, including halogen bulbs.

==== Malaysia ====
It was reported in 2012 that Malaysia would ban production, import and sales incandescent bulbs by 2014 as part of efforts to save power and to help cut greenhouse gas emissions.

==== Nepal ====
Nepal banned incandescent light bulbs on 6 July 2019.

==== North Korea ====
North Korea reportedly made LED bulbs mandatory in 2014 to alleviate its energy crisis.

==== Pakistan ====
Pakistan banned incandescent bulbs on 1 July 2023.

==== Philippines ====
The Philippines was among the first Asian countries to phase-out incandescent light bulbs. In February 2008, president Gloria Macapagal Arroyo called for a ban of incandescent light bulbs by 2010 in favor of more energy-efficient fluorescent globes to help cut greenhouse gas emissions and household costs during her closing remarks at the Philippine Energy Summit. No legislation was passed in regards to the phase-out and mostly involved the lessening the demand for incandescent bulbs.

==== Qatar ====
Qatar banned incandescent light bulbs on 1 May 2016.

==== Singapore ====
Singapore is phasing out incandescent light bulbs through 2019–23.

==== South Korea ====
South Korea has phased out incandescent light bulbs under 150 watts since 2014. The government has prohibited manufacture and import of all incandescent lights. All incandescent bulbs are going to be replaced by LED and CFL light bulbs.

==== Tajikistan ====
Tajikistan reportedly banned incandescent light bulbs in 2009 to save energy, though this was criticized as alternatives were expensive at the time.

==== United Arab Emirates ====
The UAE has banned incandescent light bulbs.

==== Uzbekistan ====
Uzbekistan banned the sale of light bulbs over 40W on 1 January 2017.

=== Europe ===
==== European Union ====
All member states of the EU agreed 2008 to a progressive phase-out of incandescent light bulbs by 2012. The initial Europe wide ban only applied to general-purpose, non-directional incandescent bulbs, so did not affect any bulbs with reflective surfaces (e.g. spotlights and halogen down lighters) or special purpose bulbs including those used in devices such as household appliances, traffic lights, infrared lamps and automotive lighting. The sale of the most inefficient bulbs was phased out. The first types to go were non-clear (frosted) bulbs, which were taken off the market in September 2009. Also from September 2009 clear bulbs over 100 W were made of more efficient types. This limit was moved down to lower wattages, and the efficiency levels raised by the end of 2012.

In practice, some manufacturers and retailers have found loopholes in the new rules so that some incandescent are still available, marketed as "rough-service" or "shock-resistant" bulbs for industrial use only. Such bulbs, may differ from standard types by only the number of filament supports and while labelled for special uses they are widely available in markets and hardware stores at much lower cost than official alternatives such as CFLs. After bans were first introduced prices of these bulbs rose by 20–25%. A German importer simply reclassified the lamps as "mini heaters" branded "Heatballs", but that was banned shortly afterwards.

The EU set a target of 2016 to phase out halogen bulbs with two directives EC 244/2009 and EC 1194/2012. The phase out of the first directive EC 244/2009 originally planned for September 2016 was delayed until September 2018. The second directive EC 1194/2012 was upheld, as part of a review of the lighting directive four criteria needed to be assessed before a phase-out could be confirmed. Issues of ‘affordability’ were under scrutiny, as well as performance, equivalence to existing models and compatibility. The EU confirmed that there was no reason to delay the ban on mains voltage directional halogen lamps, as all four of the criteria had been sufficiently met. The directive EC 1194/2012 relates to mains voltage directional halogen lamps; many common halogen reflector lamps such as D-rated GU10 bulbs are affected.

==== Iceland ====
Iceland is following the same route as the EU.

==== Montenegro ====
Montenegro banned incandescent bulbs from 2020 as part of a phased ban.

==== Norway ====
Norway has implemented the EU directive for the phase-out of incandescent light bulbs and has followed the same phase out route as the EU. There was a half-year delay in implementing the directive compared to the EU, but the phase out occurred at the same time since the affected light bulbs were no longer available from European sources.

==== Russia ====
Russia is phasing out incandescent light bulbs. The production of lamps of 100 watt and more is banned. There are also discussions to ban light bulbs of 50 watts and more.

==== Serbia ====
Serbia banned incandescent light bulbs in mid-2020.

==== Switzerland ====
Switzerland banned the sale of all light bulbs of the Energy Efficiency Class F and G, which affects a few types of incandescent light bulbs. Most normal light bulbs are of Energy Efficiency Class E, and the Swiss regulation has exceptions for various kinds of special-purpose and decorative bulbs. In line with EU rules, Switzerland banned the import and manufacture of halogen light bulbs in September 2018.

=== North America ===
==== Canada ====
The provincial government of Nova Scotia stated in February 2007 that it would like to move towards preventing the sale of incandescent light bulbs in the province.

In April 2007, Ontario's minister of energy, Dwight Duncan, announced the provincial government's intention to ban the sale of incandescent light bulbs by 2012. Later in April, the federal government announced that it would ban the sale of inefficient incandescent light bulbs nationwide by 2012 as part of a plan to cut down on emissions of greenhouse gases.

On 9 November 2011, the federal government approved a proposal to delay new energy efficiency standards for light bulbs until 1 January 2014, when it will become illegal to import inefficient incandescent lighting across the country. In December 2011, Ontario Energy Minister [Chris Bentley] confirmed that Ontario is scrapping the five-year-old plan "to avoid confusing consumers".

The Energy Star program, in which Natural Resources Canada is a partner, in March 2008 established rules for labeling lamps that meet a set of standards for efficiency, starting time, life expectancy, color, and consistency of performance. The intent of the program is to reduce consumer concerns about efficient light bulbs due to variable quality of products. Those CFLs with a recent Energy Star certification start in less than one second and do not flicker.

In January 2011, the province of British Columbia banned retailers from ordering 75- or 100-watt incandescent bulbs.

Canada's Energy Efficiency Regulations are published on the Natural Resources Canada website.

The Canadian federal government banned the import and sale of 75- and 100-watt incandescent bulbs, effective 1 January 2014. On 1 January 2015, 40- and 60-watt bulbs were also banned, although there are exceptions for oven lights, decorative lamps (light bulbs), appliance bulbs, 3-way fixtures, chandeliers and rough service/utility bulbs. Retailers will be allowed to sell their existing inventories imported before the bans.

==== Cuba ====
Cuba exchanged all incandescent light bulbs for CFLs, and banned the sale and import of them in 2006–07.

==== Jamaica ====
Jamaica banned the sale of incandescent bulbs on 1 April 2023.

==== United States ====
In December 2007, the federal government enacted the Energy Independence and Security Act of 2007 (EISA), which set maximum power consumption requirements for all general-service light bulbs producing 310–2600 lumens of light. Light bulbs outside of this range are exempt from the restrictions. Also exempt are several classes of specialty lights including appliance lamps, rough service bulbs, 3-way, colored lamps, stage lighting, plant lights, candelabra lights under 60 watts, outdoor post lights less than 100 watts, nightlights and shatter resistant bulbs. The law was to effectively ban most incandescent light bulbs, starting in January 2012. By 2020, a second tier of restrictions would become effective, requiring all general service bulbs to produce at least 45 lumens per watt, similar to a CFL, but retaining the exemption for other than general service lamps.

In March 2008, the United States Environmental Protection Agency's Energy Star program established rules for labeling lamps that meet a set of standards for efficiency, starting time, life expectancy, color, and consistency of performance. The intent of the program is to reduce consumer concerns about efficient light bulbs due to variable quality of products. Those CFLs with a recent Energy Star certification start in less than one second and do not flicker. Energy Star Light Bulbs for Consumers is a resource for finding and comparing Energy Star qualified lamps.

The 2012 United States federal budget effectively delayed the implementation of the first stage of the EISA phase-out until October 2012 by defunding all enforcement activities. Funding for enforcement was also denied in some subsequent years, at least up to 2015.

In 2014, the Department of Energy issued regulations that would extend the efficiency standards of the 2007 EISA law to certain specialty bulbs, effective January 2020. In February 2019, the Department of Energy announced a proposal to withdraw this change. In September 2019 the Trump administration rolled-back these energy efficiency standards for lightbulbs with the Energy Department's publication of regulations in the Federal Register. The Energy Department announced the reversal of the 2014 regulation that would have taken effect on 1 January 2020 and implemented the last round of energy-saving light bulb regulations outlined by the Energy Independence and Security Act of 2007. In 2022, the Biden administration undid the Trump administration’s reversal; the sale of most incandescent light bulbs was banned, effective on 1 August 2023. Despite reports that the ban were lifted by Executive Order 14154 (Unleashing American Energy), it remains in effect.

===== States =====
New Jersey and Utah introduced rules to require the use of energy efficient lighting in government buildings in 2007. Utah has also undertaken a number of LED based lighting projects to regain efficiency. Legislation was also proposed in Connecticut. In 2007, the state of California introduced legislation to phase out the use of incandescent bulbs by 2018. The bill established a minimum standard of twenty-five lumens per watt by 2013 and sixty lumens per watt by 2018.

The California regulations were challenged in court by light bulb manufacturers upon the US Energy Department's action reversing the 2014 regulation that would have taken effect on 1 January 2020. California, Colorado, Nevada, Washington, and Vermont had already adopted their own energy standards. The ruling in the manufacturer's favor would have allowed some types of incandescent bulbs to remain in service despite state regulations. A judge ruled that the state efficiency standards were proper under the congressional exemption previously granted.

=== Oceania ===
==== Australia ====
In February 2007, Australia enacted a law that, in effect, by legislating efficiency standards, disallow most sales of incandescent light bulbs by 2010. The Australian Federal Government announced minimum energy performance standards (MEPS) for lighting products. The new minimum standard efficiency level is 15 lumens per watt (lm/W). From November 2008, no non-compliant lighting (including some incandescent globes) were imported into Australia, and from November 2009, the retail sale of non-compliant lighting was banned. It was proposed that all regular light bulbs and some other kinds of light bulbs sold from October 2009 would have to meet the new minimum energy performance standards. Incandescent light bulbs that meet the new standards, for example high-efficiency halogen bulbs, would continue to be available.

It is estimated that greenhouse gas emissions will be cut by 800,000 tonnes (Australia's current emission total is 564.7 million tonnes), a saving of approximately 0.14%.

There were some initiatives to encourage people to switch to compact fluorescent lamps ahead of the phase out.

Australia initially planned to ban the sale of halogen light bulbs from September 2020, then delayed the ban to late 2021. Halogen light bulbs that were approved by the federal government's energy regulator before September 2021 can continue to be sold until their regulatory approval expires.

==== New Zealand ====
In February 2007, then Climate Change Minister David Parker, Labour Party, announced a similar proposal to the one in Australia, except that importation for personal use would have been allowed. However, this proposal was scrapped in December 2008, after a change of government, and incandescent bulbs continue to be available as of 2023.

=== South America ===
==== Argentina ====
In Argentina, selling and importing incandescent light bulbs has been forbidden since 31 December 2010.

==== Bolivia ====
Bolivia is reported to have banned incandescent light bulbs on 1 January 2014.

==== Brazil ====
As specified in Interministerial Ordinance 1,007 of 31 December 2010, incandescent light bulbs must perform according to certain levels of luminous efficacy to be produced, imported and sold in Brazil. Non-conforming light bulbs are being gradually phased out. Since July 2013, bulbs ranging from 61 to 100 watts which do not perform accordingly can no longer be produced or imported, but they could be sold until mid-2014.

Since the end of June 2016, incandescent bulbs have been completely prohibited in Brazil.

==== Chile ====
The Chilean government has prohibited the manufacture, import and sale of incandescent bulbs since December 2015.

==== Ecuador ====
Ecuador has banned incandescent bulbs.

== Public opposition ==
The phase out has been referred to as "light bulb socialism". The consumer preference for light bulbs in the EU was for incandescent bulbs, with many complaining at the time of the regulation's adoption about what was described as the "ugliness" or the "cold", "flat", "unnatural", "dull light" emanating from CFLs. Objection has also been raised to being forced to adopt CFLs.

Bulk purchasing of incandescent bulbs was reported ahead of the EU lightbulb ban. Many retailers in Britain, Poland, Austria, Germany and Hungary have reported bulk purchasing, and in Germany, sales rose by up to 150% in 2009 in comparison to 2008. Two-thirds of Austrians surveyed stated they believe the phase-out to be "nonsensical", with 53.6% believing their health to be at risk of mercury poisoning. 72% of Americans believe the government has no right to dictate which light bulb they may use. Czech Republic President Václav Klaus urged people to stockpile enough incandescent bulbs to last their lifetime.

Museums and individuals have been stockpiling incandescent lightbulbs in Europe, owing to CFLs' then-inferior color representation. The European Association for the Co-ordination of Consumer Representation in Standardisation (ANEC) has called for a speedy reduction of the mercury levels contained within CFLs from the current 5 mg limit to 1 mg. The European Consumers' Organisation said that phasing out incandescent bulbs will be detrimental for people suffering light-related health issues, and called for the continued availability of incandescent bulbs:

The EU Regulation falls short of the needs of some consumers who need to use the old-style light bulbs for health-related reasons such as light sensitivity. We call on the European Commission to take immediate measures to ensure that people who rely on incandescent light bulbs will be able to buy these bulbs until suitable alternative lighting technologies are available. There are also concerns about the risks to health from the high mercury content of the new bulbs.

A campaign group called SPECTRUM was formed by the charities Lupus UK, Eclipse Support Group, ES-UK, XP Support Group and The Skin Care Campaign as an "alliance for light sensitivity" to oppose "UK and EU plans to phase out incandescent lightbulbs". Their campaign has been picked up and amplified by the British Association of Dermatologists, calling for access to incandescent light bulbs for those who are medically sensitive to CFLs and other non-incandescent bulbs, and the charity Migraine Action, stating that its members still suffer adverse effects from CFLs despite protestations from the light bulb industry.

=== Environmental and health concerns ===
CFLs, like all fluorescent lamps, contain small amounts of mercury, as both vapor and droplets inside the glass tubing, averaging 4.0 mg per bulb. The inclusion of liquid mercury is specifically prohibited from other domestic products in some jurisdictions, notably Europe. Safe cleanup of broken compact fluorescent lamps is different from cleanup of conventional broken glass or incandescent bulbs. After a proper cleanup, any potential short term exposure offers no significant health risks to adults, including pregnant women, or to children. If all electricity was generated by a coal power plant (which produce about half the electricity the US consumes) and fluorescent light bulbs were all recycled with no mercury being lost, nearly 75% less mercury could be released in power plant emissions if incandescent bulbs were replaced by fluorescents, and with significantly less total mercury release even if no recycling occurred. However, a concern is that broken bulbs will introduce the mercury directly into a populated indoor area. Though more recent analysis indicates that the concerns about mercury release from broken bulbs may be overstated, and can be ameliorated by taking a few simple steps.

No mercury is used in the manufacturing of LED lamps, a different technology replacement for incandescent lamps. In addition, LED lamps do not require warmup time in cold weather, and in fact, perform better in colder temperatures, making them an excellent choice for use in cold locations, such as refrigeration units.

=== Cost ===
When such phase-out programs began CFL and especially LED bulb prices were substantially higher than incandescent prices and made the up-front cost a barrier to entry to many consumers despite the superior life-cycle cost of CFL and LED bulbs. Prices of CFLs and especially LEDs have since fallen making those bulbs more accessible to consumers.

==== Heating and cooling ====
With incandescent bulbs, most of the electricity goes toward producing heat rather than light; this is the main source of their inefficiency. However, this heat contributes toward heating the room, thereby either reducing heating demand or increasing cooling demand. The overall energy savings from changing to more efficient lighting depends on the climate. In warm climates, efficient lighting has the additional energy-saving effect of reducing the amount of cooling required. In cold climates, increased heating energy demand may offset some of the lighting energy saved with efficient lighting. A report published in January 2008 found that in Los Angeles, where incandescent lighting results in increased air conditioning, electricity savings would pay for the initial cost of CFLs four times faster than in Vancouver, where incandescent lighting contributes to space heating. The report claimed that due to outdoor lighting and air conditioning use in summer months, there is a net cost saving from changing to compact fluorescent lighting in all climates. The cost of CFL and LED bulbs has decreased greatly since 2008, which shortens the time needed to pay off their initial cost.

The heat produced by incandescent light bulbs is frequently seen as a drawback, but it is seen as an advantage in certain applications. For example, automotive applications in cold climates benefit from the radiated heat, as it melts potentially visually-obstructive snow and ice on warning lights and signs. The heat is also used to melt the wax inside lava lamps, which depend on the heat from an incandescent lamp to function. Other simple appliances, such as egg incubators, may also depend on the heat released by incandescent lamps.

=== Dimmability ===
Some CFLs are not compatible with existing dimming circuits such as those using TRIACs, although CFLs that support dimming are available. Halogen bulbs provide a somewhat more efficient dimmable alternative to common incandescent bulbs, although they too have been or will be phased out in many places.

Many LED bulbs are not dimmable. While dimmable ones using different drivers are available, they may not work well with traditional dimmers – either the dimming range is narrow (the minimum brightness is too high) or the bulb flickers at lower brightness, or even both.

The color temperature of incandescent bulbs – essentially the actual temperature of the hot filament – decreases as the voltage applied is reduced by a dimmer, and the light becomes visibly "warmer"; this does not happen with other technologies. However, Philips has designed LED bulbs that mimic this phenomenon when dimmed.

== See also ==
- Plastic bag ban
