= Esma Ulqinaku =

Albanian politician (born 1940)

Minister of Light Industry
- In office 15 January 1982 – 20 February 1987
- Prime Minister: Adil Çarçani
- Preceded by: Kristaq Dollaku
- Succeeded by: Vito Kapo

Personal details
- Born: 8 December 1940 (age 85) Shkodër, Albania
- Party: Party of Labour
- Occupation: Politician

Esma Ulqinaku (born 8 October 1940) is an Albanian politician who served as Minister of Light Industry from 1982 until 20 February 1987.

== Life and career ==
Ulqinaku was born in Shkodër, Albania. In 1982, Esma Ulqinaku was appointed Minister of Light Industry in Albania. She served in the government under Adil Çarçani, the first cabinet of Çarçani from 15 January 1982 until 20 February 1987. She was named First Vice-Minister of the same ministry. Ulqinaku was succeeded by Vito Kapo as Minister of Light Industry and was preceded by politician Kristaq Dollaku.
