= European Society for Mathematics and the Arts =

European Society for Mathematics and the Arts (ESMA) is a European society to promoting mathematics and the arts. The first Conference of ESMA, took place in July 2010 at the Institute Henri Poincaré in Paris.
