= Deutsche Akademie für Fernsehen =

Organization in Germany

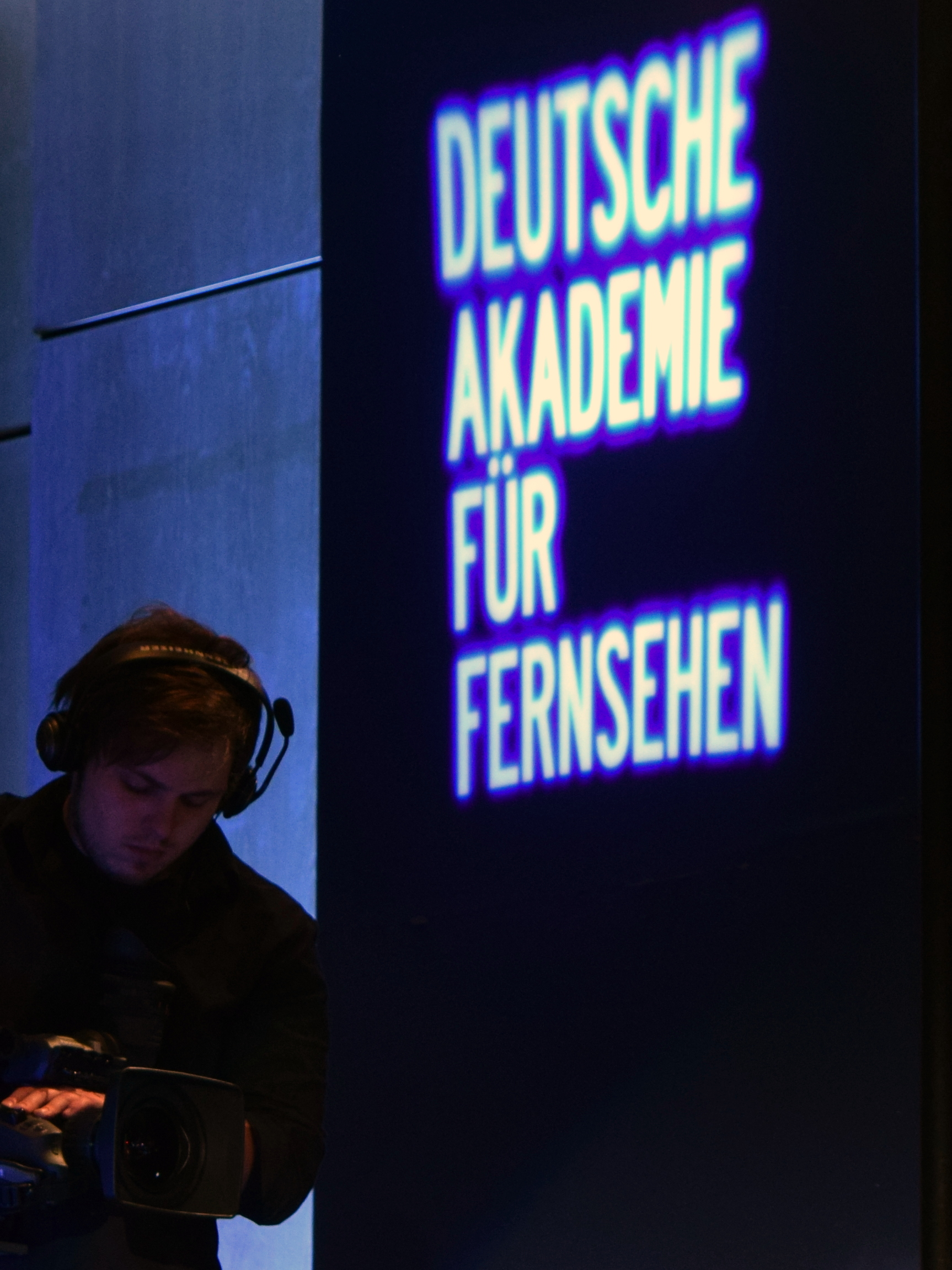
The DAFF Symposium 2015 at the NRW Filmforum, Cologne

The Deutsche Akademie für Fernsehen (DAfF; German Television Academy) was founded in December 2010 by television professionals from various fields of television production. It has its headquarters in Munich and an office in Cologne.

== Origin, purpose and activities ==
According to its statutes, its purpose is

- to promote the development of German television as an essential component of German culture and the German cultural industry and to preserve its diversity
- to encourage, strengthen and cultivate discussion and the exchange of ideas and experience between German television professionals, especially between freelancers and those employed by broadcasters
- to lead the discourse on content and economic aspects of German television.

The chairman is actor Michael Brandner. His four deputies are screenwriter Jochen Greve, casting director Cornelia von Braun, set designer Frank Godt, and producer Stephan Ottenbruch from the television entertainment sector. Producer Frank Döhmann will assume the office of treasurer. The producer Gerhard Schmidt is the President of the academy.

Of the 23 sections that had been planned (including direction, screenplay, music, documentary, acting, image design, sound design), some were constituted. The number of members is 800.

Every two months a nationwide "Jour fixe" takes place in the cities of Berlin, Cologne, Hamburg and Munich.

According to Vice Chairman Jochen Greve, one of the founding intentions was that "television should not be left to the broadcasters alone" The intention was rather: "We want to be a voice of the creative. We want to give people dignity."

In May 2018, the association participated in the establishment of the Themis-Vertrauensstelle gegen sexuelle Belästigung and Gewalt (Trust Centre against sexual harassment and violence).

== Award ceremony ==
Since 2013, the association has presented an annual award for achievements in all trades of television production. Each section of the academy can nominate a prize in its own field. The Acting Section can nominate prizes in four categories: Best Actress in a Lead Role, Best Actor in a Lead Role, Best Actress in a Supporting Role and Best Actor in a Supporting Role. The winners are then chosen by all members of the academy.

The winners of the awards since 2013 were:

=== Image Design ===
- 2013: Thomas Benesch, The Impossible Crime
- 2014: Holly Fink, Spreewaldkrimi: Mörderische Hitze
- 2015: Kolja Brandt, Naked Among Wolves
- 2016: Jakub Bejnarowicz, Point Blank
- 2017: Eeva Fleig, Blaumacher
- 2018: Nikolaus Summerer, Dark
- 2019: Philipp Haberlandt, Beat

=== Casting ===
- 2013: Sarah Lee and Nina Haun, Generation War
- 2014: Heta Mantscheff, Weissensee, 2. Season
- 2015: Marc Schötteldreier, Beware of People
- 2016: Ulrike Müller, NSU German History X: Die Opfer – Vergesst mich nicht
- 2017: Iris Baumüller, 4 Blocks
- 2018: Anja Dihrberg, Bad Banks
- 2019: Daniela Tolkien, Der Pass

=== Documentary film ===
- 2013: Eric Schulz, Karajan – Das zweite Leben
- 2014: Martin Farkas and Dominik Graf, Es werde Stadt! 50 Jahre Grimme Preis in Marl
- 2015: John Goetz and Poul-Erik Heilbuth, Jagd auf Snowden – Wie der Staatsfeind die USA blamierte
- 2016: Birgit Schulz and Luzia Schmid, Zum Glück Deutschland – Ein anderer Blick auf unser Land
- 2017: Till Schauder and Christoph Menardi, Glaubenskrieger
- 2018: Katja Fedulova and Calle Overweg, Drei Engel, Russland – Glaube, Hoffnung, Liebe
- 2019: Regina Schilling and Thomas Kufus, Kulenkampffs Schuhe

=== Screenplay ===
- 2013: Beate Langmaack, Blaubeerblau
- 2014: Thomas Kirchner, Spreewaldkrimi: Mörderische Hitze
- 2015: Michael Proehl, Tatort – Im Schmerz geboren
- 2016: Magnus Vattrodt, Ein großer Aufbruch
- 2017: Esther Bernstorff, Ein Teil von uns
- 2018: Dorothee Schön, Erich Kästner and Little Tuesday
- 2019: Dietrich Brüggemann, Tatort: Murot und das Murmeltier

=== Television journalism ===
- 2013: Monika Anthes and Eric Beres, Der Fall Mollath
- 2014: Monika Anthes and Edgar Verheyen, Deutschlands Ferkelfabriken
- 2015: Daniel Harrich and Ulrich Chaussy, Attentäter – Einzeltäter? – Neues vom Oktoberfestattentat
- 2016: Rainald Becker and Christian H. Schulz, Schattenwelt BND – Wie viel Geheimdienst braucht Deutschland?
- 2017: Christian Stücken, Die Story im Ersten: Der vertuschte Skandal
- 2018: Stephan Lamby and Egmont R. Koch, Bimbes – Die schwarzen Kassen des Helmut Kohl
- 2019: Frank Zintner, Dem Rechtsruck auf der Spur. Eine Zeitung sucht Antworten

=== Television entertainment ===
- 2013: Frank-Markus Barwasser, Pelzig hält sich
- 2014: Anke Engelke, Anke hat Zeit
- 2015: Lutz Heineking Jr., Endlich Deutsch!
- 2016: Tim Mälzer and Sven Steffensmeier, Kitchen Impossible
- 2017: Olli Schulz and Jan Böhmermann, Schulz und Böhmermann
- 2018: Maren Kroymann, Philipp Käßbohrer and Matthias Murmann, Kroymann
- 2019: Peter Wohlleben, Henning Gode, Bettina Böttinger, Der mit dem Wald spricht – unterwegs mit Peter Wohlleben

=== Film editing ===
- 2013: Jens Klüber, The Tower
- 2014: Tina Freitag, Spreewaldkrimi: Mörderische Hitze
- 2015: Ulf Albert, Autumn Tingles: Speed Dating for Silver Hairs
- 2016: Claus Wehlisch, Polizeiruf 110 – Und vergib uns unsere Schuld
- 2017: Claudia Wolscht, Manhunt: Escape to the Carpathians
- 2018: Janina Gerkens, Die Freibadclique
- 2019: Barbara Brückner, Tatort: Anne und der Tod

=== Costume picture ===
- 2013: Wiebke Kratz, Generation War
- 2014: Monika Hinz, Weissensee, 2. Season
- 2015: Bettina Catharina Proske, Let's Go
- 2016: Wiebke Kratz, Leberkäseland
- 2017: Gabriele Binder, Rivals Forever: The Sneaker Battle
- 2018: Pierre-Yves Gayraud, Babylon Berlin
- 2019: Esther Amuser, Lotte am Bauhaus

=== Mask image ===
- 2013: Gerhard Zeiß, Generation War
- 2014: Jens Bartram, Judith Müller and Katja Schulze, Public Enemies
- 2015: Gerhard Zeiss & Silka Lisku, Tannbach – Schicksal eines Dorfes
- 2016: Astrid Weber and Hannah Fischleder, The General Case
- 2017: Jeanette Latzelsberger, Gregor Eckstein and Iris Peleira, Charité
- 2018: Heiko Schmidt, Kerstin Gaecklein and Roman Braunhofer (Special Effects Maske), Babylon Berlin
- 2019: Delia Mündelein and Sonja Fischer-Zeyen, Aufbruch in die Freiheit

=== Music ===
- 2013: Irmin Schmidt, The Impossible Crime
- 2014: Ralf Wienrich, Spreewaldkrimi: Mörderische Hitze
- 2015: Fabian Römer, Tannbach – Schicksal eines Dorfes
- 2016: Christoph Zirngibl, Neben der Spur – Amnesie
- 2017: Stefan Will and Marco Dreckkötter, 4 Blocks
- 2018: Tom Tykwer and Johnny Klimek, Babylon Berlin
- 2019: Ben Lukas Boysen and Paul Emmerich, Beat

=== Production ===
- 2013: Uli Putz and Jakob Claussen and Anja Föringer, Mobbing
- 2014: Thomas Kufus, 24h Jerusalem
- 2015: Michael Eckelt, Autumn Tingles: Speed Dating for Silver Hairs
- 2016: Gabriela Sperl, Max Wiedemann, Quirin Berg and Sophie von Uslar, NSU German History X
- 2017: Max Wiedemann, Quirin Berg, Eva Stadler, Karsten Rühle, Anke Greifeneder and Hannes Heyelmann, 4 Blocks
- 2018: Lisa Blumenberg, Bad Banks
- 2019: Eva Kemme, Tobias Siebert, Florian Deyle and Philip Schulz-Deyle, Alles Isy

=== Editorial office/Producing ===
- 2013: Barbara Buhl, Im Netz
- 2014: Thomas Biehl, Solveig Willkommen and Birgit Brandes, Danni Lowinski, 5. Season
- 2015: Claudia Simionescu, Der Fall Bruckner
- 2016: Sascha Schwingel, Stefan Kruppa and Till Derenbach, Fatal News
- 2017: Anke Greifeneder, 4 Blocks
- 2018: Caroline von Senden, Alexandra Stain, Andreas Schreitmüller and Uta Cappel, Bad Banks
- 2019: Philipp Käßbohrer and Matthias Murmann, How to Sell Drugs Online (Fast)

=== Director ===
- 2013: Philipp Kadelbach, Generation War
- 2014: Kai Wessel, Spreewaldkrimi: Mörderische Hitze
- 2015: Urs Egger, Der Fall Bruckner
- 2016: Christian Schwochow, NSU German History X: Die Täter – Heute ist nicht alle Tage
- 2017: Marvin Kren, 4 Blocks
- 2018: Hans-Christian Schmid, Das Verschwinden
- 2019: Isabel Kleefeld, Aufbruch in die Freiheit

=== Actor leading role ===
- 2013: Tom Schilling, Generation War
- 2014: Roeland Wiesnekker, Spreewaldkrimi: Mörderische Hitze
- 2015: Hans-Michael Rehberg, Schuld nach Ferdinand von Schirach: Schnee
- 2016: Nicholas Ofczarek, Tatort – Die Geschichte vom bösen Friederich
- 2017: Frederick Lau, 4 Blocks
- 2018: Barry Atsma, Bad Banks
- 2019: Thomas Schmauser, Der große Rudolph

=== Actress leading role ===
- 2013: Judy Winter, Mom's Gotta Go
- 2014: Christina Große, Neufeld, mitkommen!
- 2015: Ina Weisse, Unexpected
- 2016: Dagmar Manzel, Besuch, Emma
- 2017: Rosalie Thomass, The Unheard Woman
- 2018: Petra Schmidt-Schaller, Eine gute Mutter
- 2019: Anna Schudt, Aufbruch in die Freiheit
- 2021: Aylin Tezel, Unbroken

=== Actress supporting role ===
- 2013: Katharina Thalbach, Der Minister
- 2014: Barbara de Koy, Tatort: Am Ende des Flurs
- 2015: Angela Winkler, Das Gewinnerlos
- 2016: Stephanie Japp, Hidden Identity
- 2017: Sandra Hüller, Crime Scene Cleaner – Özgür
- 2018: Désirée Nosbusch, Bad Banks
- 2019: Lena Urzendowsky, Der große Rudolph

=== Actor supporting role ===
- 2013: Christian Redl, Marie Brand und die offene Rechnung
- 2014: Peter Jordan, Polizeiruf 110: Abwärts
- 2015: Ulrich Matthes, Bornholmer Straße
- 2016: Björn Meyer, Crime Scene Cleaner – Pfirsichmelba
- 2017: Ronald Kukulies, Tatort – Borowski und das Fest des Nordens
- 2018: Albrecht Schuch, Bad Banks
- 2019: Hans Löw, Alles Isy

=== Stunt ===
- 2013: Sandra Barger and Wanja Götz, Generation War
- 2014: Christoph Domanski, Alarm, Cobra 11
- 2015: Ronnie Paul, Tatort – Wer Wind erntet, sät Sturm!
- 2016: Ronnie Paul, Too Young to Die
- 2017: Tobias Nied, Alarm, Cobra 11 – Phantomcode
- 2018: Dani Stein, Babylon Berlin
- 2019: Wanja Götz and Lisa Maria Potthoff, Sarah Kohr: Das verschwundene Mädchen

=== Production design ===
- 2013: Thomas Stammer, Generation War
- 2014: Frank Godt, Weissensee (2. Season)
- 2015: Jill Schwarzer, Bissige Hande
- 2016: Lars Lange, Ku'damm 56
- 2017: Myrna Drews, Hedda
- 2018: Albrecht Konrad, Gladbeck, and Udo Kramer, Dark
- 2019: Andrea Kessler, Aufbruch in die Freiheit

=== Sound design ===
- 2013: Jan Petzold (Ton) and Gerald Cronauer (Mischung), Im Netz
- 2015: Thomas Warneke, Andreas Hintzsch and Clemens Grulich, Die Schneekönigin
- 2016: Eric Rueff, Frank Mareite, Stefan Kolleck and Malte Zurbonsen, Weinberg
- 2017: Tomáš Bělohradský, Thomas Neumann and Gregor Bonse, The Same Sky
- 2018: Patrick Veigel (Ton) and Florian Beck (Mischung), Das Verschwinden
- 2019: Herbert Verdino (O-Ton), Nico Krebs (Mischung and Sounddesign) and Wolfi Müller (Geräuschemacher), Der Pass

=== VFX/Animation ===
- 2015: Denis Behnke, Naked Among Wolves
- 2016: Denis Behnke, Starfighter
- 2017: Jan Adamczyk and Denis Behnke, The Same Sky
- 2018: Robert Pinnow, Babylon Berlin
- 2019: Viktor Muller and Vít Komrzý, Das Boot
