= Ádám Varga =

Ádám Varga may refer to:

- Ádám Varga (wrestler) (born 1989), Hungarian wrestler, participated in Wrestling at the 2015 European Games – Men's Greco-Roman 98 kg
- Ádám Varga (actor) (born 1989), Hungarian actor starring in Land of Storms in 2014
- Ádám Varga (footballer) (born 1999), Hungarian football player
- Ádám Varga (canoeist) (born 1999), Hungarian canoeist
