= Move fast and break things =

Move fast and break things may refer to:

- Move fast and break things (motto), internal motto used by Facebook until 2014, as coined by Mark Zuckerberg
- Move Fast and Break Things (book), 2017 book by Jonathan Taplin subtitled How Facebook, Google and Amazon Have Cornered Culture and Undermined Democracy
- "Move Fast and Break Things", a 2020 episode of How to Sell Drugs Online (Fast)
- "Move Fast and Break Things", a 2022 episode of Mr. Mayor
