= Die Camper =

German television series

- Starring: Willi Thomczyk; Antje Lewald; René Heinersdorff; Dana Golombek; Andreas Windhuis; Andrea Badey; Wilfried Herbst
- Music by: Jörg Ollefs
- Country of origin: Germany
- No. of seasons: 9
- No. of episodes: 117

Production
- Running time: 25:00

Original release
- Network: RTL Television
- Release: 21 February 1997 – 7 April 2006

Die Camper ('The Campers') is a German television series. It revolves around the group of friends and fellow camper Hajo (Michael Brandner), Heidi Wüpper (Sabine Kaack), daughter Nicole (Wolke Hegenbarth), Dieter Denkelmann (Heinrich Schafmeister) and Roswitha Fischer (Katharina Schubert).

After season 1 the cast was replaced by Benno (Willi Thomczyk) and Uschi Ewermann (Antje Lewald) as well as Lothar (René Heinersdorff) and Stefanie Fuchs (Dana Golombek).

== Location ==
Die Camper was filmed at a real camping site in Odenthal.

== See also ==
- List of German television series
