= Wolke Hegenbarth =

German actress

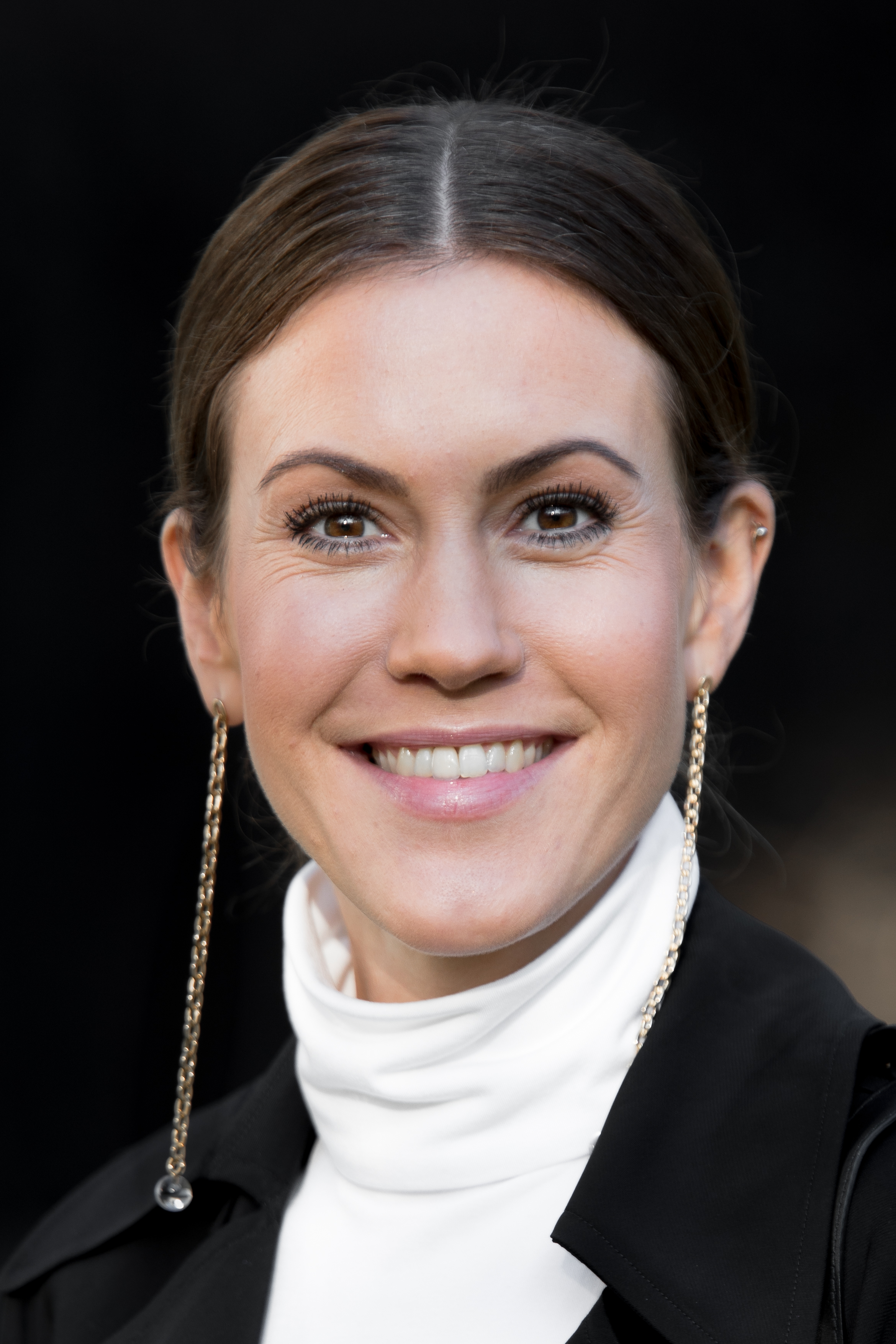
- Wolke Hegenbarth in 2018, at Berlin Film Festival
- Born: 6 May 1980 (age 46); Meerbusch, West Germany
- Occupation: actress
- Known for: Mein Leben & Ich
- Spouse: Justin Bryan (2002–2012)

Wolke Alma Hegenbarth (born 6 May 1980, Meerbusch) is a German actress, best known for starring in the sitcom Mein Leben & Ich. She is related to illustrator Hannes Hegen (born Johannes Hegenbarth) and the painter Josef Hegenbarth.

== Personal life ==
Wolke Hegenbarth was born on 6 May 1980 in the West German town of Meerbusch, North Rhine-Westphalia. Her uncommon first name, Wolke (German for "cloud"), was her father's wish, who fought successfully in court to name her this way. Hegenbarth herself says that 20% of her prominence probably results from this name. At the age of four, she started with ballet lessons. She finished her Abitur in 1999. In 2002, she married South African Justin Bryan, whom she met on an internship in 1999, and whom she divorced in 2012.

== Acting career ==
She was discovered in 1995 for the popular German sitcom Die Camper, which launched her acting career, after involuntarily attending screen tests. Hegenbarth herself says that she did not want to become an actress, but, rather, a make-up artist. After her role in Die Camper, she played a number of roles in other TV series. In 1996, she was first offered the starring role in the RTL sitcom Mein Leben & Ich (2001–2007), where she played an individualist teenager struggling in a world of unindividualistic teens. In 2004, she won the German Comedy Award for her role in Mein Leben & Ich. After the end of Mein Leben & Ich, she mainly starred in TV films.

She was a candidate on Let's Dance, with former professional dancer Oliver Seefeldt as her partner, in 2006. On 30 June 2007, she and Seefeldt won the German Eurovision Dance Contest-preliminaries, and they entered the 2007 contest together, reaching the 8th place.

== Other activism ==
Hegenbarth is a sponsor for two children for World Vision, and supports the campaign "Trotz AIDS".

== Filmography ==
=== Films ===
- 1997: Freundinnen & andere Monster
- 1998: Ich liebe meine Familie, ehrlich
- 1998: OA jagt Oberärztin
- 2003: Die Schönste aus Bitterfeld
- 2004: Crazy Race 2 – Warum die Mauer wirklich fiel
- 2004: Playa del Futuro
- 2005: Tote Hose – Kann nicht, gibt's nicht
- 2005: Ein Hund, zwei Koffer und die ganz große Liebe
- 2007: Der Prinz von nebenan
- 2008: Liebesticket nach Hause
- 2008: Ich steig' Dir aufs Dach, Liebling
- 2010: Im Brautkleid durch Afrika
- 2011: Indisch für Anfänger
- 2013: Sex´and´Zaziki – Landliebe

=== TV series ===
- 1997: Die Camper
- 1998: Schlosshotel Orth (episode: "Neue Aufgaben")
- 1999: Die Anrheiner (3 episodes)
- 2000: Drehkreuz Airport (episode: "Quarantäne")
- 2000–2001: Polizeiruf 110 (3 episodes)
- 2001: Der Alte (episode: "Mord auf Bestellung")
- 2001–2007: Mein Leben & Ich
- 2002: Cologne P.D. (episode: "Oliver W. - Tod eines Schülers")
- 2003: SOKO 5113 (episode: "Eine feine Gesellschaft")
- 2004: Tramitz and Friends
- 2006: Die ProSieben Märchenstunde (episode: "Der gestiefelte Kater")
- 2010: Notruf Hafenkante (9 episodes)
- 2010: Alarm für Cobra 11 (1 episode)
- 2010: Eine Möhre für Zwei (26 episodes)
- 2011: Indisch für Anfäger
- 2012: Es kommt noch dicker
- 2012-2017: Heiter bis tödlich - Alles Klara (48 episodes)
- 2014: Boomerang Märchenstunde
- 2017: Stuttgart Homicide, Episode Ein Alibi zu viel

=== Other ===
- 2010: Die Schöne und der Hai (documentation for Arte)
