= Rock My Heart (film) =

2017 film by Hanno Olderdissen

- Directed by: Hanno Olderdissen
- Written by: Clemente Fernandez-Gil; Hanno Olderdissen
- Produced by: Boris Schönfelder
- Starring: Lena Klenke; Emilio Sakraya; Milan Peschel
- Edited by: Claudia Wolscht
- Production companies: Neue Schönhauser Filmproduktion GmbH; ARD Degeto Film GmbH; Senator Film Produktion GmbH
- Distributed by: Wild Bunch Germany; Netflix
- Release dates: September 26, 2017 (Schlingel Film Festival); September 28, 2017
- Running time: 105 minutes
- Country: Germany
- Language: German

Rock My Heart is a 2017 German drama film directed by Hanno Olderdissen and written by Clemente Fernandez-Gil and Hanno Olderdissen. The plot revolves around the 17-year-old girl Jana (Lena Klenke), with a congenital heart condition. Despite her illness, she is recruited by the racehorse trainer Paul Brenner (Dieter Hallervorden) to be his next prospective jockey.

== Plot summary ==
17-year-old Jana (Lena Klenke) suffers from a congenital heart condition. Jana forms an unlikely bond with an unruly black stallion, and is recruited by racehorse trainer Paul Brenner (Dieter Hallervorden) to be his next prospective jockey.

== Cast ==
- Lena Klenke as Jana
- Emilio Sakraya as Samy
- Milan Peschel as Steckel
- Anneke Kim Sarnau as Sabine Brenner
- Annette Frier as Beate Hilbig
- Dieter Hallervorden as Paul Brenner
- Natalia Romanova as Hofmitarbeiterin
- Johann von Bülow as Dr. Korten
- Michael Lott as Joachim Hilbig
- Amrei Haardt as Schwester Mirjam
- Patrick Simons as Hofmitarbeiter
- Hans Martin Stier as Kronweiler
- Vedat Erincin as Samy's Vater
- Rolf Berg as Bankangestellter

== Release and reception ==
Rock My Heart was released in theatres on September 28, 2017 in Germany, and was later released on June 6, 2019 on Netflix streaming but was removed in June 2024.

=== Awards ===
Award winner	Year	Award	Category	Result
Hanno Olderdissen	2017	Int. Filmfestival Schlingel	Blickpunkt Deutschland	Nominated
Hanno Olderdissen	2018	Berlin & Beyond Festival	Youth 4 German Cinema Runner-up	Won
Hanno Olderdissen	2018	Goldener Spatz	Wettbewerb Kino-/Fernsehfilm	Nominated
Hanno Olderdissen	2018	Shanghai Int. Film Festival	Focus Germany	Nominated
Hanno Olderdissen	2018	Metropolis - Deutscher Regiepreis	Beste Regie Kinderfilm	Nominated
Emilio Sakraya	2018	Bunte New Faces Award Film	Bester Nachwuchsschauspieler	Nominated
