= 25 km/h =

2018 film by Markus Goller

- Theatrical release poster
- Directed by: Markus Goller
- Written by: Oliver Ziegenbalg
- Produced by: Oliver Ziegenbalg; Markus Goller
- Starring: Bjarne Mädel; Lars Eidinger
- Cinematography: Frank Griebe
- Production companies: Deutsche Columbia Pictures Filmproduktion; SunnySideUp Film Produktion; Pictures in a Frame; Traumfabrik Babelsberg; Babelsberg Film; Mythos Film Produktions
- Distributed by: Sony Pictures Releasing
- Release date: 31 October 2018
- Running time: 116 minutes
- Country: Germany
- Language: German

25 km/h is a 2018 German road movie directed by Markus Goller.

== Synopsis ==
After the death of their father, two estranged brothers embark on a road trip through Germany on mopeds that they planned when they were kids.

== Cast and characters ==
- Bjarne Mädel as Georg Schneider
- Lars Eidinger as Kristian Schneider
- Sandra Hüller as Tanja
- Franka Potente as Ute
- Alexandra Maria Lara as Ingrid
- Jella Haase as Willie
- Jördis Triebel as Lisa
- Wotan Wilke Möhring as Hantel
- Matti Schmidt-Schaller as Konrad
- Mateusz Kościukiewicz as Adam
