= Matthias Murmann =

German film producer (born 1984)

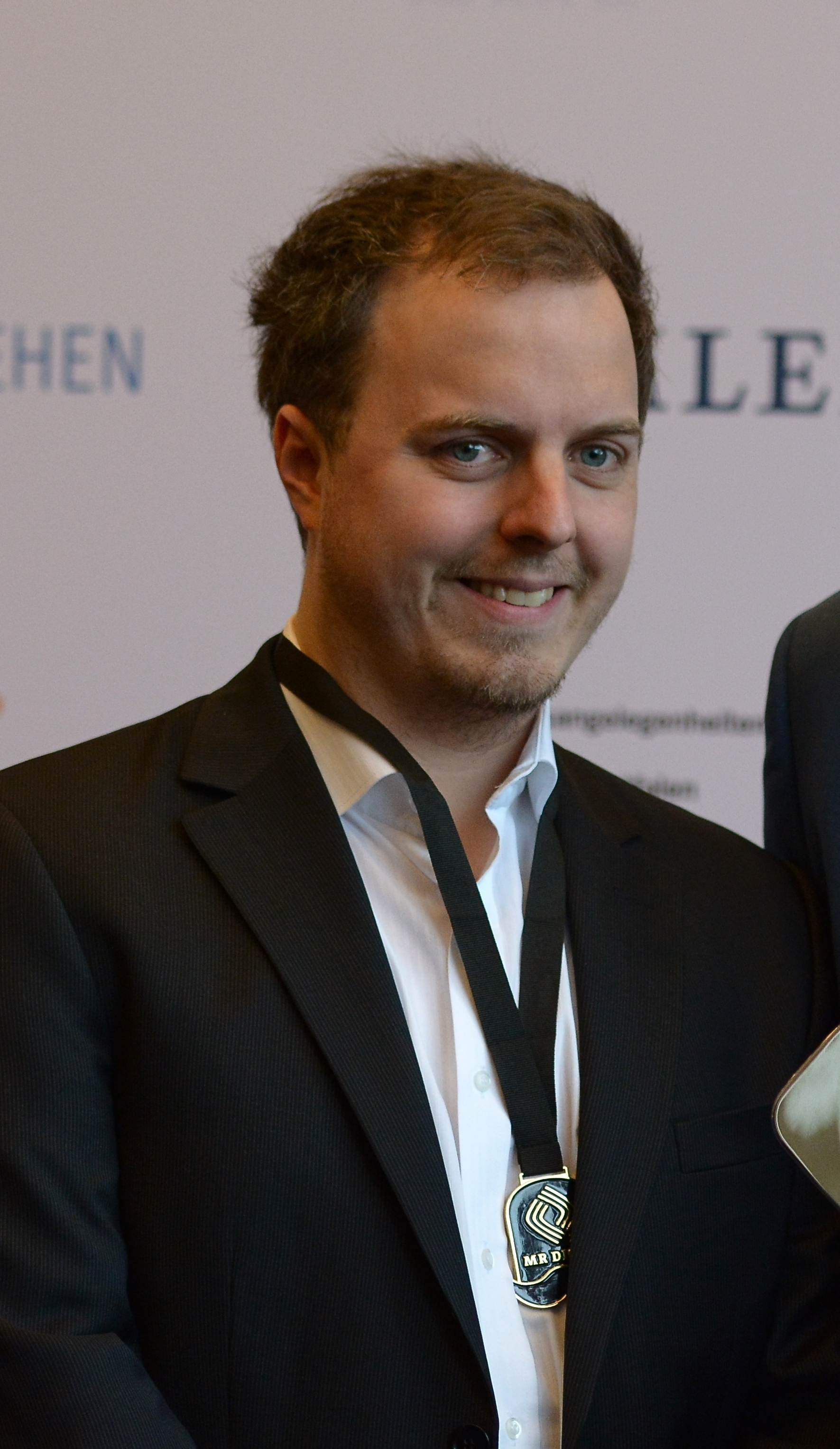
- Murmann in 2015
- Born: Matthias Joachim Schulz; August 28, 1984 (age 41); Aachen
- Occupations: Producer; screenwriter
- Years active: 2008–
- Known for: bildundtonfabrik
- Works: How to Sell Drugs Online (Fast); Neo Magazin; King of Stonks

Matthias Joachim Murmann, (né Matthias Joachim Schulz; born 28 August 1984) is a German film producer. He is known for shows such as Neo Magazin and How to Sell Drugs Online (Fast). Murmann was awarded the Grimme-Preis and the Deutscher Fernsehpreis.

== Education ==
After an audio-visual media designer apprenticeship, Murmann studied Film and Television at Academy of Media Arts Cologne. From 2008 until 2012, Murmann produced several short films, adverts, and music videos. His 2010 film Armadingen (co-produced with Philipp Käßbohrer) was awarded several short-film festival prizes. Murmann's and Käßbohrer's first feature film Das Problem des Schnellstfluges was released in 2016.

== Career ==
Following Armadingen, Matthias Murmann and Philipp Käßbohrer began working on a concept for a late-night talk show featuring Jan Böhmermann and Charlotte Roche. The show, broadcast on ZDFkultur, was met with generally favourable reviews, and received a nomination for the 2012 Grimme-Preis. Eventually, Käßbohrer and Murmann were awarded the 2012 Deutscher Fernsehpreis's Förderpreis, and founded the film production company bildundtonfabrik.

In 2013, Murmann and Käßbohrer created the late-night talk show Neo Magazin that aired on ZDFneo and later on ZDF. Later that year, Murmann was the executive producer of the WDR show Kebekus! hosted by Carolin Kebekus.

Throughout the following years, Murmann was the executive producer of the WDR comedy show Die unwahrscheinlichsten Ereignisse im Leben von ..., and the infotainment show Mr. Dicks - Das erste wirklich subjektive Gesellschaftsmagazin that aired on 1Live and EinsFestival. Since 2017, Murmann has been producing the comedy show Kroymann, aired on ARD. The show is hosted by Maren Kroymann, who satirically discusses social topics and problems. In 2018, Murmann co-created WDR's online platform docupy, which includes documentary films on sociopolitical topics, directed by him.

Since 2018, Murmann has been the showrunner of the Netflix series How to Sell Drugs Online (Fast). The first season aired in 2019; season two and three followed in 2020 and 2021 respectively.

In 2021, Murmann co-produced the documentary film Shiny Flakes: The Teenage Drug Lord about Maximilian Schmidt. Schmidt inspired Käßbohrer to write his How to Sell Drugs Online (Fast). Murmann and Käßbohrer will be the executive producers of Netflix's King of Stonks that is said to air in 2022.

== Filmography ==
- 2010: Armadingen (producer)
- 2013: Kebekus! (producer)
- 2013 - 2019: Neo Magazin Royale (screenwriter, producer)
- 2016 - 2017: Schulz & Böhmermann (producer)
- 2017 - 2018: Kroymann (producer)
- 2018: Lass dich überwachen! Die Prism is a Dancer Show (producer)
- 2018: Get Well Soon - The Horror (online series) (producer)
- 2019: How to Sell Drugs Online (Fast) (executive Producer, creator)
- 2020: Die Carolin Kebekus Show (producer)
- 2020: Drinnen - Im Internet sind alle gleich (online series) (producer)
- 2021: Shiny Flakes: The Teenage Drug Lord (producer)
- 2021: King of Stonks (executive Producer, creator)
