= Lena Urzendowsky =

German actress (born 2000)

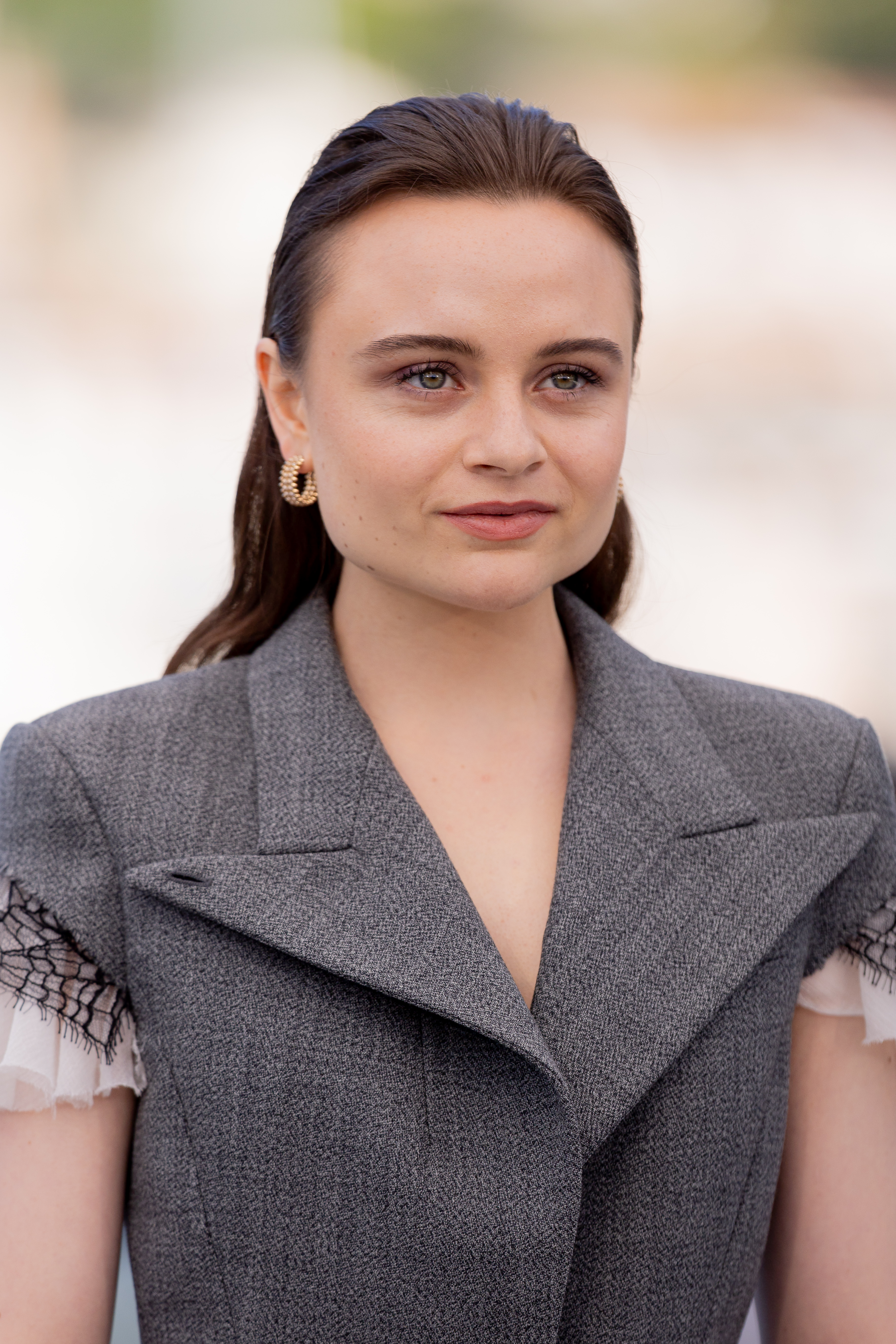
- Urzendowsky at the 2025 Cannes Film Festival
- Born: Lena Friederike Urzendowsky; 16 February 2000 (age 26); Berlin, Germany
- Education: Humboldt University of Berlin
- Occupation: Actress
- Years active: 2014–present
- Relatives: Sebastian Urzendowsky (brother)

Lena Friederike Urzendowsky (born 16 February 2000) is a German actress.

== Biography ==
Urzendowsky was born in Friedrichshain, Berlin, and spent most of her childhood in Steglitz and Schöneberg. Her mother, Jeanette, and older brother, Sebastian, are also actors. Urzendowsky herself became interested in acting at the age of five after watching a children's musical at the Friedrichstadt-Palast. She took acting, singing, and dance lessons at Stagefactory until the age of 12, when she began applying to talent agencies. She was initially rejected due to her lack of experience, but later signed to an agency at the age of 14. She made her screen debut in the ZDF television film The Snow Queen in 2014.

She briefly attended high school in France through a student exchange program, and later completed her Abitur in 2018. During the summer of 2022, she studied at the Stella Adler Studio of Acting in New York City. She currently studies philosophy and social sciences at Humboldt University of Berlin. She lives in Wedding.

== Filmography ==
=== Film ===
Year	Title	Role	Ref.
2016	Bibi & Tina: Mädchen gegen Jungs	Mia	
2020	Cocoon	Nora	
2021	Trümmermädchen	Evi	
2021	Zwischen uns	Elena Winkler	
2021	Sweet Disaster	Yolanda	
2023	Franky Five Star	Franky	
2023	791 km	Susi	
2024	Jenseits der blauen Grenze	Hanna Klein	
2024	From Hilde, with Love	Liane Berkowitz	
2024	Rabia	Oum Zayd	
2025	Sound of Falling	Angelika	

=== Television ===
Year	Title	Role	Notes	Ref.
2014	The Snow Queen	Robber's daughter	Television film	
2016	The White Rabbit	Sara Rost	Television film	
2017	Kein Herz für Inder	Fiona Neufund	Television film	
2017	Der Usedom-Krimi: Nebelwand	Simone Simmank	Television film	
2017	Der Usedom-Krimi: Trugspur	Simone Simmank	Television film	
2017–2020	Dark	Young Ines Kahnwald	3 episodes	
2018	Der große Rudolph	Eva-Maria "Evi"	Television film	
2018	Der Kriminalist	Danny Torenz	Episode: "Fenster zum Hof"	
2019	Kranke Geschäfte	Kati Glaser	Television film	
2019–2025	How to Sell Drugs Online (Fast)	Milena "Kira" Bechtholz	19 episodes	
2020	Tatort: Leonessa	Vanessa Michel	Television film	
2020	The Defeated	Green Eyes	2 episodes	
2021	We Children From Bahnhof Zoo	Stella	8 episodes	
2021	Mutter kündigt	Josephine "Joe" Michelsen	Television film	
2021	Tatort: Luna frisst oder stirbt	Nellie "Luna" Kunze	Television film	
2023	Luden	Manu Melzer	6 episodes	
2025	Tatort: Das Ende der Nacht	Carla Radek	Television film	
2025	Black Gold	Luisa Pape		

== Awards and nominations ==
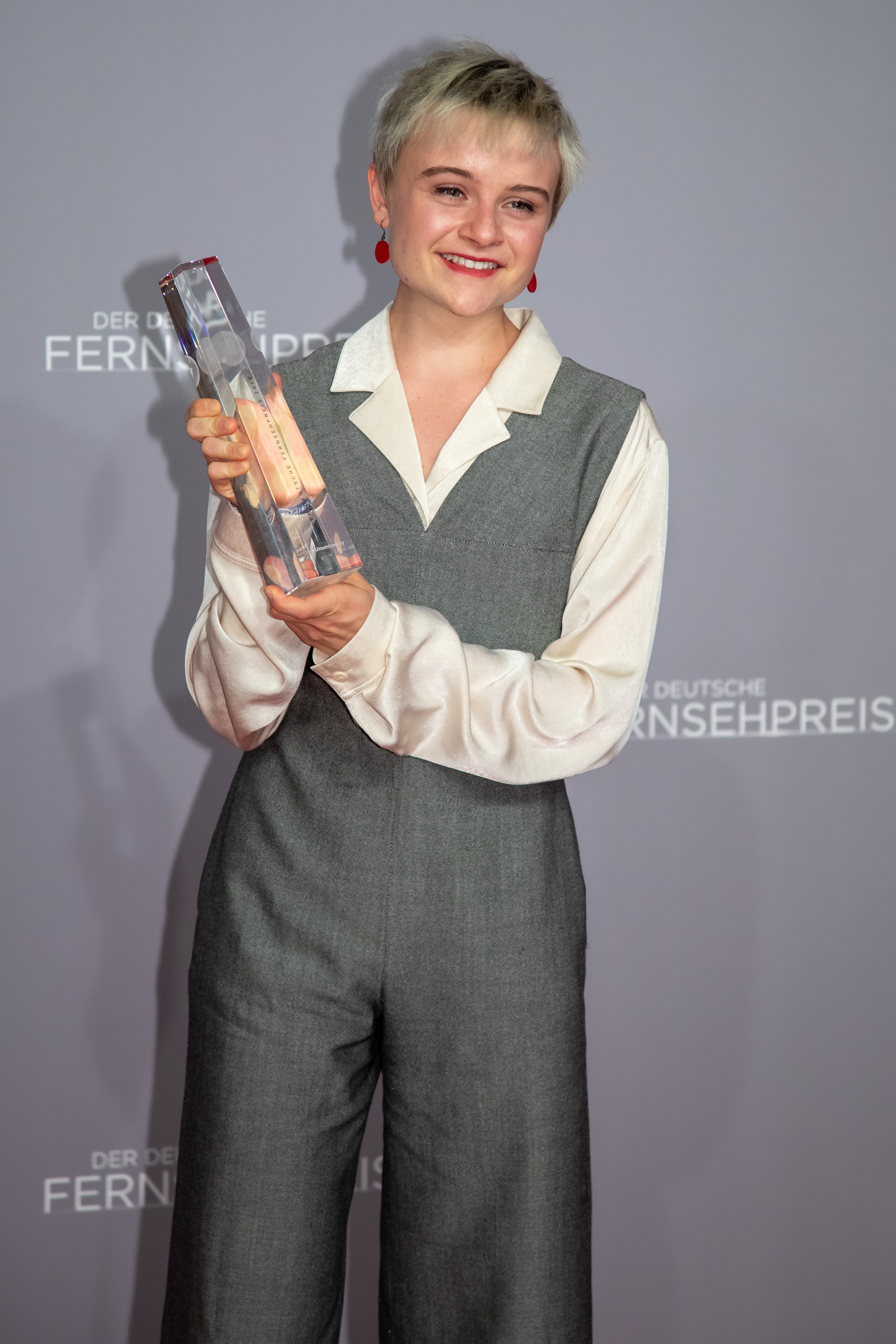
Urzendowsky at the Deutscher Fernsehpreis in 2019

Award	Year	Category	Nominated work	Result	Ref.
Bavarian Film Awards	2021	Best Young Actress	Cocoon	Won	
German Film Critics Association Awards	2021	Best Actress	Cocoon	Nominated	
German Screen Actors Awards	2019	Best Young Actor	Der große Rudolph	Won	
German Television Academy Awards	2019	Best Supporting Actress	Der große Rudolph	Won	
German Television Awards	2019	Young Talent Award	Der große Rudolph	Won	
Grimme-Preis	2017	Grimme Award for Fiction	The White Rabbit	Won	
Günter-Strack-Fernsehpreis	2017	Best Young Actress	The White Rabbit	Won	
Hessischer Fernsehpreis	2018	Best Actress	Der große Rudolph	Won	
New Faces Award	2017	New Faces Award for Acting	The White Rabbit	Nominated	
