= Lena Klenke =

German actress

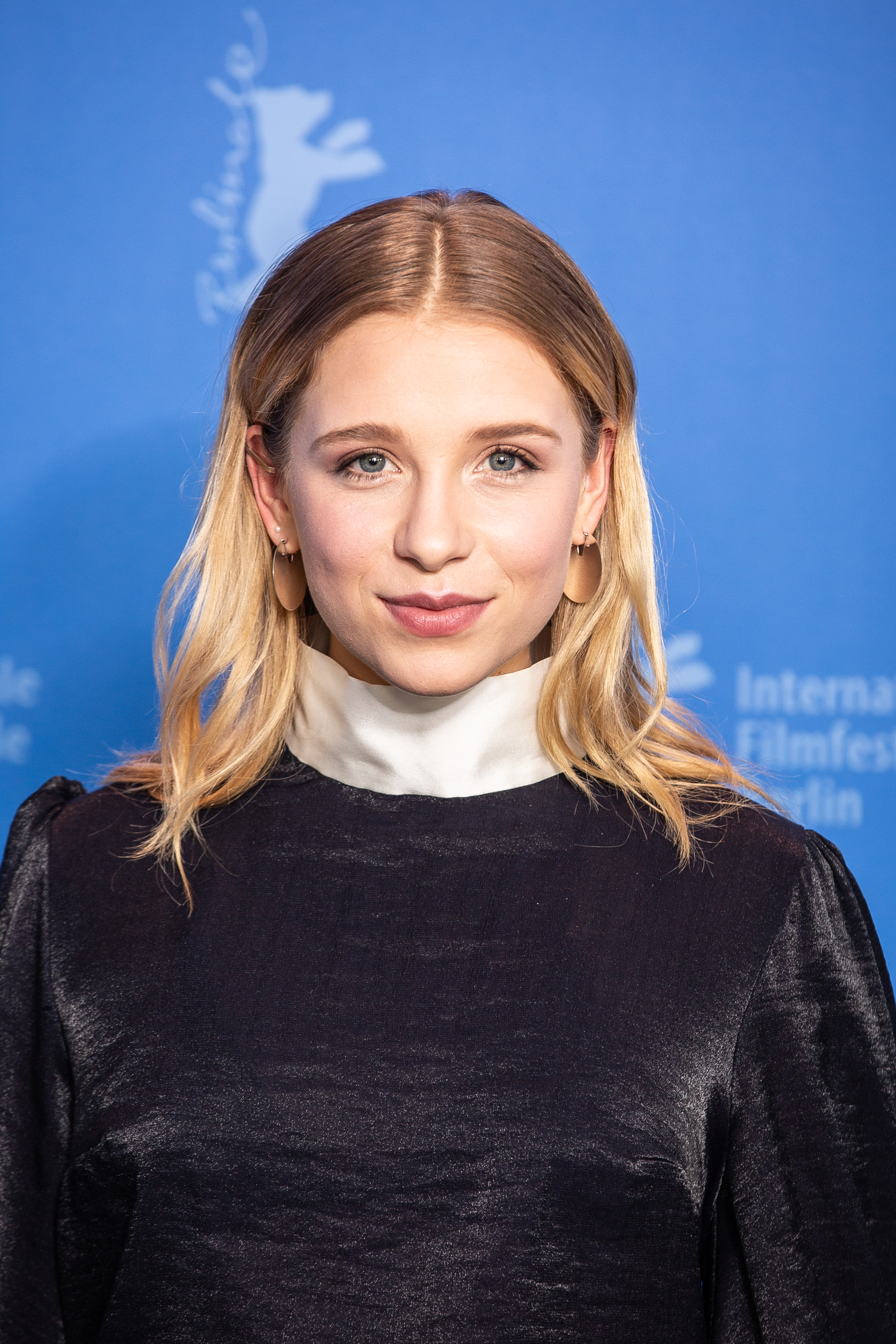
- Klenke at the 2018 Berlin Film Festival
- Born: 25 December 1995 (age 30); Munich, Germany
- Occupation: Actress
- Years active: 2010–present

Lena Klenke (born 25 December 1995) is a German actress. She is best known for her role as Lisa Novak in the 2019 Netflix series How to Sell Drugs Online (Fast).

== Early life ==
Klenke was educated at Carl-von-Ossietzky-Gymnasium and at Free University of Berlin.

== Career ==
She started her career in 2010 in the film The Silence and has had primary roles in German films and TV series. In 2013, she made a cameo in Fack ju Gohte. In 2019, she appeared in the Netflix comedy drama How to Sell Drugs Online (Fast). She appears in seasons 1, 2, 3 and 4.

== Selected filmography ==
Year	Title	Role	Notes
2010	The Silence	Sinikka Weghamm	
2013	Binge Drinking (TV film)	Sylvia Manthey	
2013	Fack ju Göhte	Laura Schnabelstedt	
2014	So schön wie Du (short)		
2014	Letzte Spur Berlin		Episode: "Hunger"
2014	Tatort	Hanna Leibold	Episode: "Das verkaufte Lächeln"
2015	Leipzig Homicide	Babsie	Episode: "Bewegliche Ziele"
2015	Zwei Familien auf der Palme (TV film)	Chiara von Zangenheim	
2015	Notruf Hafenkante		Episode: "Fremde Heimat"
2015	Victoria	Young Mother	
2015	Fack ju Göhte 2	Laura Schnabelstedt	
2015	Die Klasse – Berlin '61	Bärbel	
2015	Die Neue	Jacqueline	
2015	Lena Fauch	Anna Knapp	Episode: "Du sollst nicht töten"
2016	Unser Traum von Kanada (TV mini-series)	Lina van Laak	Episode: "Sowas wie Familie"
2016	Tatort	Harriett Wiesler	Episode: "Fünf Minuten Himmel"
2017	Rock My Heart – Mein wildes Herz	Jana	
2017	Fack ju Göhte 3	Laura Schnabelstedt	
2017	Babylon Berlin		
2018	The Silent Revolution	Lena	
2018	Tatort	Mia Korf	Episode: "Damian"
2019	8 Tage (TV mini-series)	Leonie	Main cast; 8 episodes
2019–2025	How to Sell Drugs Online (Fast)	Lisa Novak	Main cast, Season 1, 2, 3
2024	Perfect Match	Steffi Graf	
