= Bjarne Mädel =

German actor (born 1968)

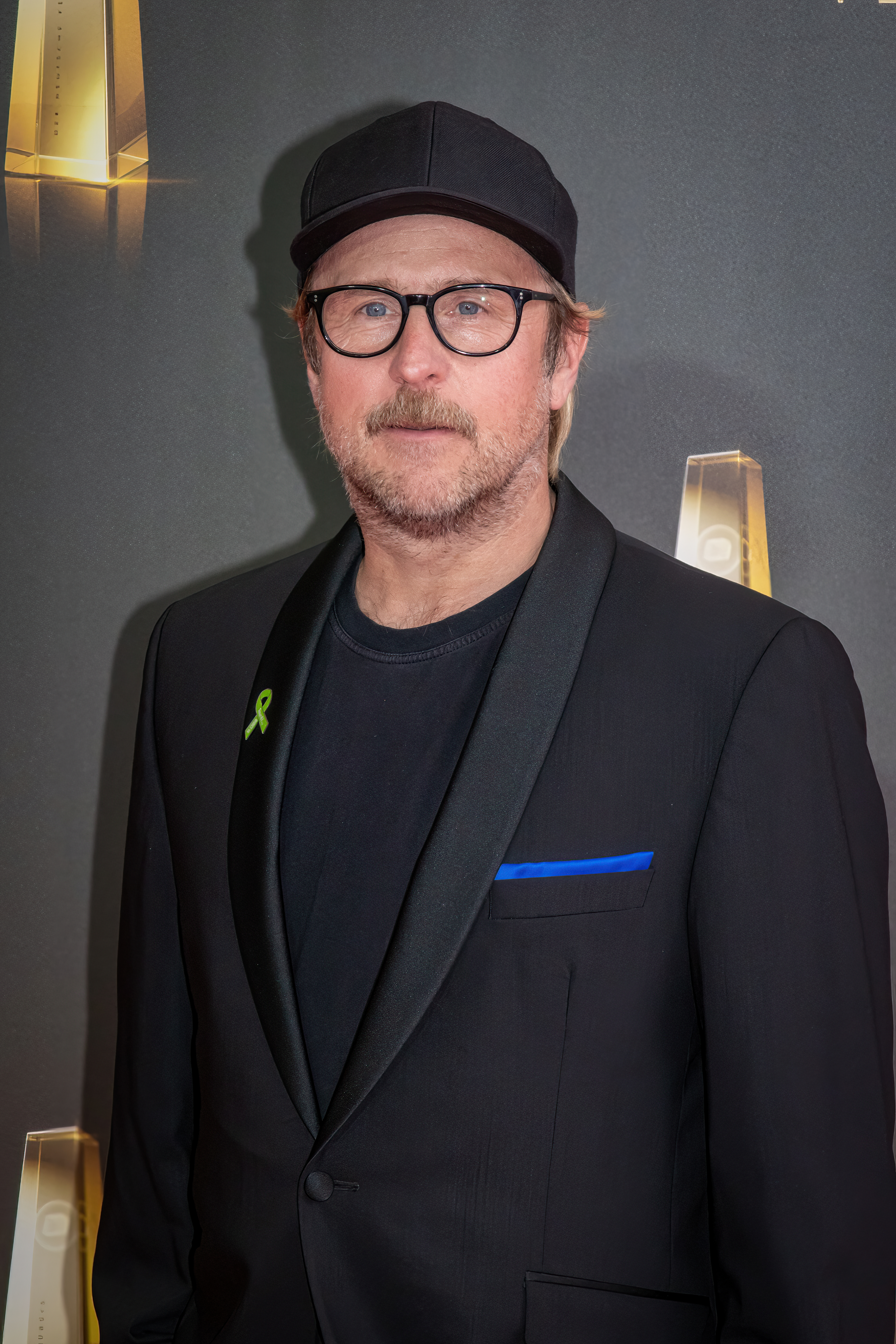
- Mädel in 2021
- Born: 12 March 1968 (age 57); Hamburg, West Germany
- Occupation: Actor

Bjarne Mädel (born 12 March 1968) is a German actor based in Berlin, best known for his roles as Heiko "Schotty" Schotte in the 2011–2018 television series Crime Scene Cleaner and as Jakob "Buba" Otto in the 2019 first season of How to Sell Drugs Online (Fast) as well as its 2022 spin-off prequel film Buba.

== Biography ==
Born in Hamburg, Mädel graduated from the Burggymnasium in Friedberg in der Wetterau. He studied theater studies and literature at the University of Erlangen and attended the University of Redlands in California. Mädel completed a diploma course in acting at the Konrad Wolf Film University of Babelsberg in Potsdam between 1992 and 1996.

He worked at Rostock People's Theatre from 1996 to 1999 and at Deutsches Schauspielhaus in Hamburg from 2000 to 2005. He gained television exposure starting in 2004 with the series Stromberg.

In 2019, he portrayed the drug dealer Jakob "Buba" Ottoas in the first season of How to Sell Drugs Online (Fast), before reprising his role in the spin-off prequel film Buba in 2022.

In 2020, Mädel directed the NDR film Sörensen hat Angst and also took on the leading role as Chief Detective Sörensen.

== Awards and recognition ==
For his role in the series Crime Scene Cleaner, he was awarded the Grimme Prize in 2012 and 2013.

== Selected filmography ==
=== Film ===
List of film appearances, with year, title, and role shown
Year	Title	Role	Notes
2006	37 ohne Zwiebeln	Ben	Short
2007	Messy Christmas	Max	
2014	Stromberg – Der Film	Berthold "Ernie" Heisterkamp	
2016	24 Weeks	Markus Häger	
2018	25 km/h	Georg Schneider	
2022	Buba	Jakob "Buba" Otto	

=== Television ===
List of television appearances, with year, title, and role shown
Year	Title	Role	Notes
1999	Für alle Fälle Stefanie	Ekke Hoppe	1 episode
2001	Alphateam – Die Lebensretter im OP	Max Kroll	1 episode
2002	Der Ermittler	Kai Hase	1 episode
2003	Adelheid und ihre Mörder	Robert Kreile	1 episode
2004–2012	Stromberg	Berthold "Ernie" Heisterkamp	46 episodes
2005	Bella Block		1 episode
2005	SOKO Wismar	Bernd Strübing	1 episode
2006	Donna Leon	Nicolo Resto	1 episode
2007, 2020	Tatort	Martin Scholz / Heribert Scharf	3 episodes
2008–2014	Mord mit Aussicht	Dietmar Schäffer	39 episodes
2009	Der kleine Mann	Rüdiger Bunz	8 episodes
2009	Polizeiruf 110	Herr Jünnemann	1 episode
2009	Löwenzahn	Marthaler	1 episode
2010	Küstenwache	Fedor Priemer	1 episode
2011–2018	Crime Scene Cleaner	Heiko "Schotty" Schotte	31 episodes
2012	Der Dicke	Phillip Ücker	1 episode
2012	Dittsche	Heiko "Schotty" Schotte	1 episode
2017	Bruder: Schwarze Macht	Kurt	4 episodes
2019	How to Sell Drugs Online (Fast)	Jakob "Buba" Otto	Season 1; 6 episodes

== Literature ==
- Hoff, Hans [in German] (13 March 2012). "Fettes Brot". Süddeutsche.de (in German).
