= Michael Brandner (actor) =

German actor (born 1951)

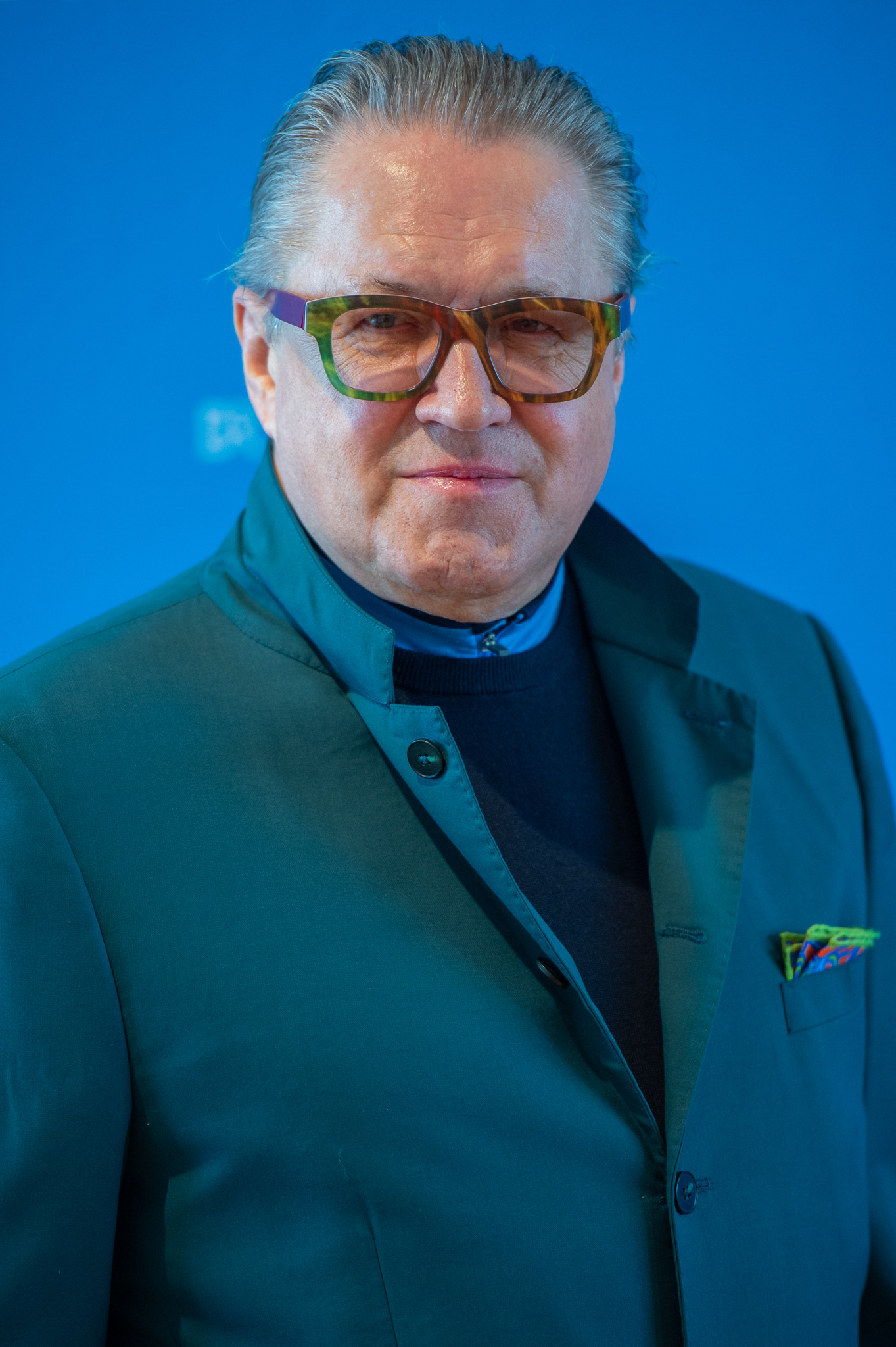
- Brandner in 2019
- Born: 22 November 1951 (age 74); Augsburg, West Germany
- Occupation: Actor
- Years active: 1988–present

Michael Brandner (born 22 November 1951) is a German actor. He appeared in more than one hundred films since 1988. He is co-founder and 1st chairman of the Deutsche Akademie für Fernsehen based in Munich and Cologne.

== Selected filmography ==
Film
Year	Title	Role	Notes
1988	Ein Treffen mit Rimbaud		
1992	North Curve	Hartmut Halbroth	
1995	Club Las Piranjas	Karl-Heinz Schadletzki	
1998	Die Healthy	Michael Töggel	
1998	The Sleeper	Hansen	
1999	Bang Boom Bang	Flughafensicherheitsbeamter	Uncredited
1999	'Ne günstige Gelegenheit	Gerd Steinbach	
2001	Venus and Mars	Ernst	
2001	Leo & Claire	Fritz Haeberlein	
2002	If It Don't Fit, Use a Bigger Hammer	Ernst Wiesenkamp	
2004	Mädchen, Mädchen 2 – Loft oder Liebe	Karl Heinz	
2004	Downfall	Hans Fritzsche	
2004	Sergeant Pepper	Bernd Bauer	
2004	Dark Kingdom: The Dragon King	Mime	
2007	Military Academy	Musterungsarzt	
2008	Ossi's Eleven	Bruno Franke	
2009	Männersache	Heinz König	
2010	The Whore	Graf von Keilburg	
2011	Wunderkinder	Alexi	
2014	The Monuments Men	Dentist	
2015	Master of Death	Kurt Weisgerber	

TV
Year	Title	Role	Notes
1994	Kommissar Rex	Prohaska	
1997	Die Camper	Hajo Wüpper	
2011–	Hubert ohne Staller (Hubert und Staller)	Reimund Girwidz	
2015	Jana und der Buschpilot – Einsame Entscheidung	Philip Lavar	
