= In a Land That No Longer Exists =

2022 film

- Film poster
- Directed by: Aelrun Goette
- Written by: Aelrun Goette
- Produced by: Tanja Ziegler
- Starring: Marlene Burow; Sabin Tambrea; David Schütter; Claudia Michelsen; Jördis Triebel
- Cinematography: Benedict Neuenfels
- Edited by: Julia Karg
- Music by: Boris Boyadzhiev
- Release date: 21 October 2022
- Running time: 101 minutes
- Country: Germany
- Language: German

In a Land That No Longer Exists (German: In einem Land, das es nicht mehr gibt) is a 2022 German historical drama film, written and directed by Aelrun Goette in her feature debut.

The film is about a young woman who is thrust into the fashion scene of communist East Germany after a photograph of her ends up by chance on the cover of Sibylle magazine. It is partially based on the life story of Goette, who was also a model in East Germany.

== Plot ==
In 1989, 18-year-old Suzi is caught by the Volkspolizei with the book 1984 and a "Swords to Ploughshares" patch. She is barred from her high school graduation exams and is forced to work in an electrical cable factory. One day while riding a tram, Suzi is randomly photographed by a young photographer, Coyote, and ends up on the cover of the Sibylle fashion magazine. Suzi is invited to the editorial office, and takes a modelling job with the magazine to escape her life as a factory worker. She delves both into the world of "official" East German fashion, and also the fashion underground with her mentor, the gay, free-spirited Rudi. Suzi experiences greater freedom and falls in love with Coyote – but Coyote wants to escape to the West. Suzi must choose between leaving her career as a model and betraying her friends.

== Cast ==
- Marlene Burow as Suzi
- Sabin Tambrea as Rudi
- David Schütter as Coyote
- Claudia Michelsen as Dr. Elsa Wilbrodt
- Jördis Triebel as Gisela
