= Maximilian Mundt =

German actor

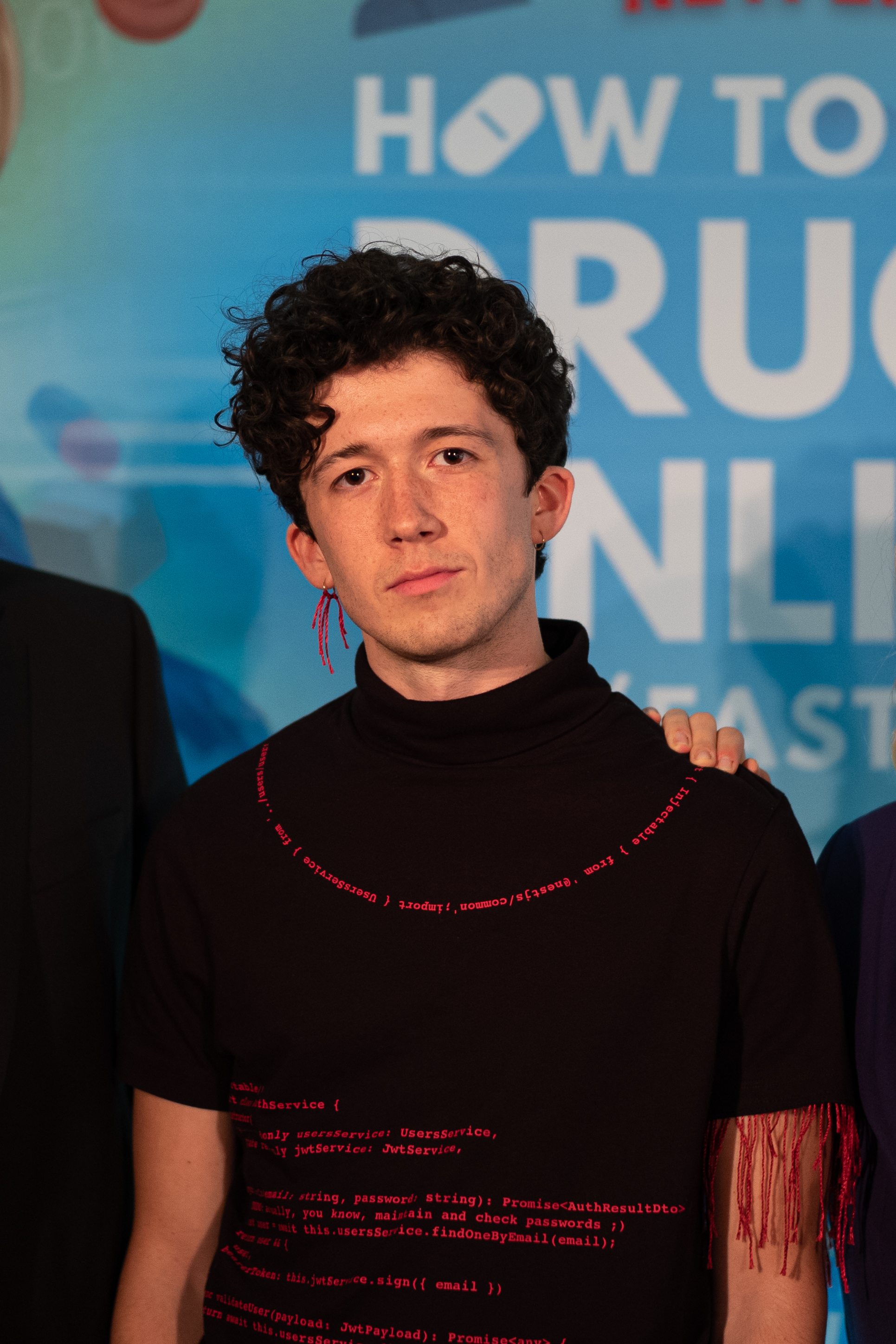
- Mundt in 2019
- Born: April 1996 (age 30); Hamburg, Germany
- Occupation: Actor
- Years active: 2013–present

Maximilian Mundt (born April 1996) is a German actor, photographer, and filmmaker. He is primarily known for his role as Moritz Zimmerman on the German-language Netflix series How to Sell Drugs Online (Fast).

== Biography ==
Mundt was born in Hamburg in 1996. He is the son of an East German nurse and a car mechanic from Hungary. He graduated from the Bondenwald Gymnasium in 2014. His first television appearances were in series such as Notruf Hafenkante, Die Pfefferkörner, Großstadtrevier, and Nord bei Nordwest. Since 2013, he has been a member of the youth performance group at the Thalia Theater in Hamburg under the direction of Alina Gregor. Since 2015, he has also been the dramaturgical consultant for the young theater group.

Mundt's first leading film role was in the 2015 Ruhrpott comedy Radio Heimat. In 2017, Mundt also appeared in Ute Wieland's film Tiger Milk. In 2019, Mundt took on the leading role in the successful Netflix series How to Sell Drugs Online (Fast), and soon after, Mundt gained international recognition. Mundt also revealed that he met Maximilian Schmidt, the actual drug dealer the show was based on, while on set.

Aside from acting, Mundt also works as a filmmaker and photographer. Following several publications of his work in print and on television, he won the German Youth Photography Award in 2015. He has also made several short films as a cameraman and director and has been studying film at the Hamburg University of the Arts since 2016.

In February 2021, Mundt came out as gay as part of the #actout initiative in SZ magazine along with several other LGBT members.

In 2024, he landed a role in the Neill Blomkamp film Gran Turismo as one of the drivers.

== Filmography ==
Film
Year	Name	Role	Notes
2015	Radio Heimat	Mücke	
2017	Tiger's Milk	Tobi	
2017	Nord bei Nordwest – Gold!	Max Busch	Television Film
2022	Buba	Moritz Zimmerman	Netflix Film
2023	Conti – My Two Faces	Carlo	Television Film
2023	Gran Turismo	Klaus Hoffman	

Television
Year	Name	Role	Notes
2013	Notruf Hafenkante	Felix Hoffmann	1 Episode
2014	Die Pfefferkörner	Theo	1 Episode
2019	How to Sell Drugs Online (Fast)	Moritz Zimmerman	Main Cast
2020	Dunkelstadt	Kilian von Rose	1 Episode
2022	Ze Network	Thomas Gesach	Main Cast
2024	Pumpen	Leo	1 Episode
