= Sebastian Urzendowsky =

German actor (born 1985)

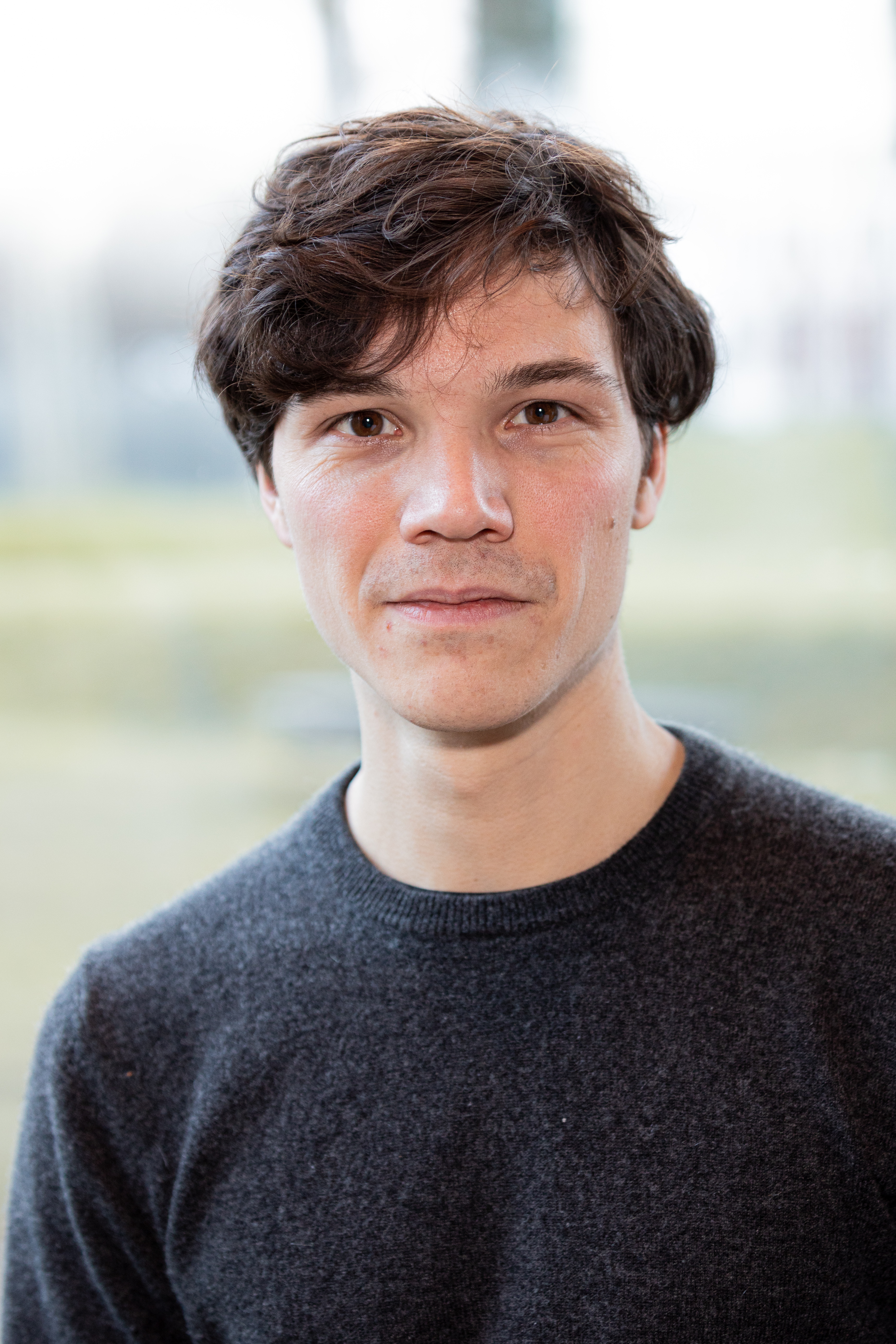
- Urzendowsky in 2019
- Born: 28 May 1985 (age 41); East Berlin, East Germany
- Occupation: Actor
- Years active: 1998–present
- Relatives: Lena Urzendowsky (sister)

Sebastian Urzendowsky (born 28 May 1985) is a German actor. He has appeared in more than thirty films since 1998.

== Personal life ==
His younger sister, Lena Urzendowsky, is also an actor.

== Selected filmography ==
Film
Year	Title	Role	Notes
2002	A Map of the Heart		
2003	Distant Lights	The Boy Young	
2007	The Counterfeiters	Karloff/Kolya	
2008	A Woman in Berlin	Young German soldier	
2008	Guter Junge	Sven	
2009	Berlin 36	Marie Ketteler	
2010	The Way Back	Russian soldier Kazik	
2011	Goodbye First Love	Sullivan	
2014	Land of Storms	Bernard	
2018	Jessica Forever	Michael	
2019	I Was, I Am, I Will Be	Johann	

TV
Year	Title	Role	Notes
2012	The Tower	Christian Hoffmann	
2013	Borgia	Cardinal Juan Borgia Lanzol	
2016	NSU German History X	Uwe Böhnhardt	
2017-2022	Babylon Berlin	Max Fuchs	
