= Mein Leben & Ich =

- Also known as: My Life & Me
- Created by: Paula A. Roth
- Starring: Wolke Hegenbarth; Nora Binder; Sebastian Kroehnert; Frederik Hunschede; Maren Kroymann; Gottfried Vollmer
- Opening theme: There She Goes - Sixpence None The Richer "Oooh!" - Stretch Princess
- Country of origin: Germany
- Original language: German
- No. of episodes: 74 in 6 seasons

Production
- Producer: Sony Pictures
- Running time: 25 minutes

Original release
- Network: RTL
- Release: September 14, 2001 – December 20, 2009

Mein Leben & Ich [My Life & Me] is a German sitcom produced by Sony Pictures in association with RTL Television. Original ran was from September 14, 2001 to December 20, 2009. The series, which was created by Paula A. Roth and directed by Richard Huber, is loosely based on ABC's 1994 teen drama My So-Called Life. The series focuses on the life of misanthropic student Alex Degenhardt (Wolke Hegenbarth), who deals with everyday life and her sometimes frustrating friends, Claudia (Nora Binder) and Niko (Sebastian Kroehnert), as well as her family: her little brother Basti (Frederik Hunschede) and her hippie parents Hendrik (Gottfried Vollmer) and Anke (Maren Kroymann). A sixth season was produced in 2006 but not shown until late 2009.

It is also broadcast in Finland by Nelonen as Elämä on Laiffii, in France as Ma vie à moi, and in Spain as Mi Vida y Yo.
