= Claudia Michelsen =

German actress (born 1969)

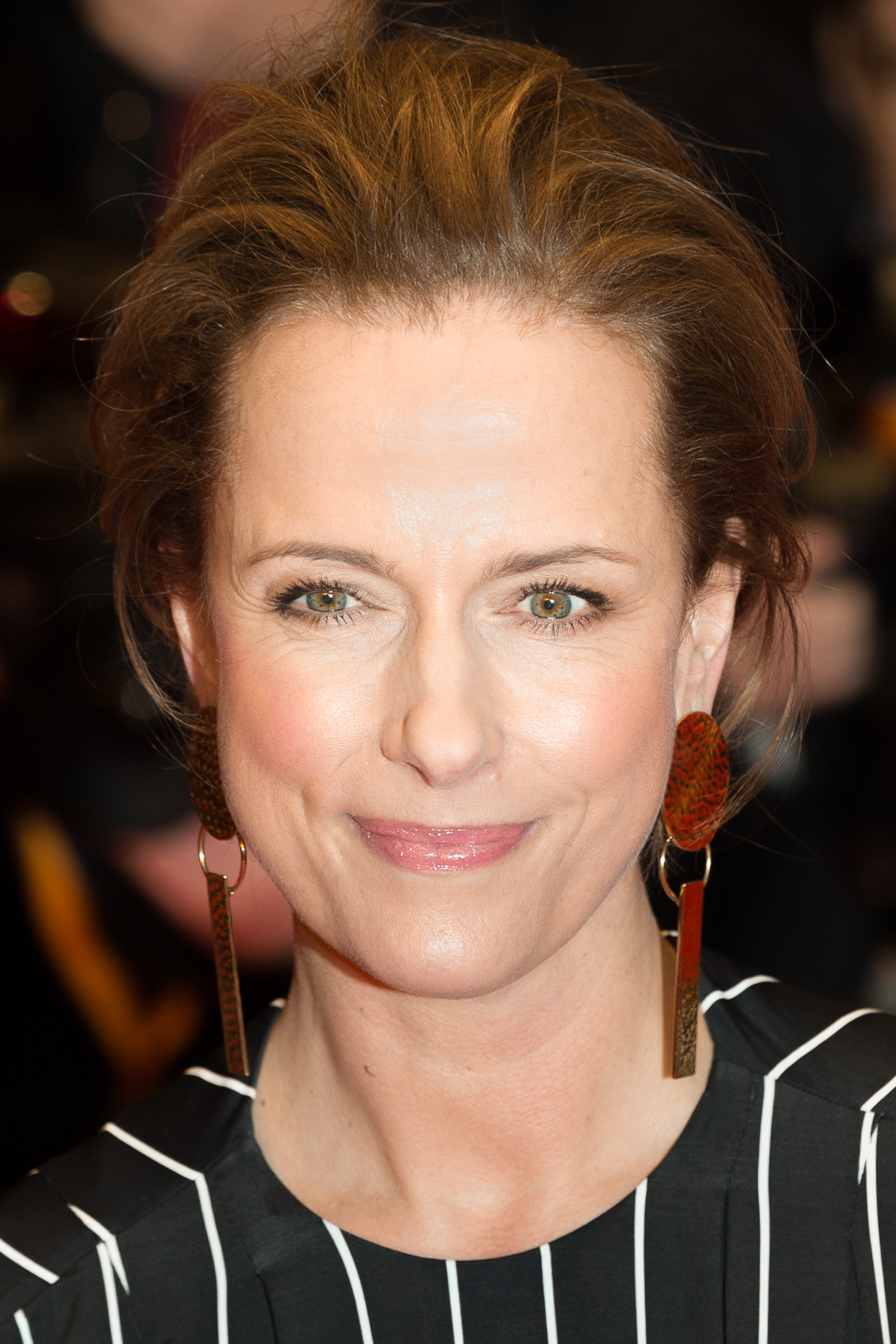
- Claudia Michelsen at the Berlinale 2017
- Born: 4 February 1969 (age 57); Dresden, East Germany
- Occupation: Actress
- Years active: 1989-present

Claudia Michelsen (born 4 February 1969) is a German actress. She was born in Dresden and is based in Berlin. She has appeared in more than eighty films since 1989.

== Selected filmography ==
Year	Title	Role	Notes
1991	Allemagne 90 neuf zéro	Charlotte Kestner / Dora	
1996	Brennendes Herz	Mieke	TV film
1997	The Deep End	Anna	TV film
1999	Castor	Nadja	TV film
2000	Falling Rocks	Jessica	TV film
2001	The Tunnel	Carola Langensiep	TV film
2001	Death Row	Corinna Pohl	TV film
2004	Before the Fall	Stein	
2006	Maria an Callas	Anni Ritz	
2006	Fay Grim	Judge	
2007	The Hunt for Troy	Michaela Neumann	TV film
2007	42plus	Christine	
2007	Abducted	Ellen Lund	TV film
2009	Pope Joan	Countess Richild	
2010	The Silence	Julia Friedrich	
2011	The Man from Beijing	Vivi Sundberg	TV film
2012	The Tower	Anne Hoffmann	TV film
2013	Scale 6	Mara Graf	TV film
2013	Grenzgang	Kerstin	TV film
2014	A Faithful Husband	Helen Martin	TV film
2014	The Legend of the Mask	Katja Bennecke	TV film
2018	Mack the Knife: Brecht's Threepenny Film	Mrs. Peachum	
2019	Das Ende der Wahrheit	Aline Schilling	TV film
2022	In a Land That No Longer Exists	Elsa Wilbrodt	
