= Philipp Käßbohrer =

German film producer and director (born 1983)

Philip Georg Käßbohrer
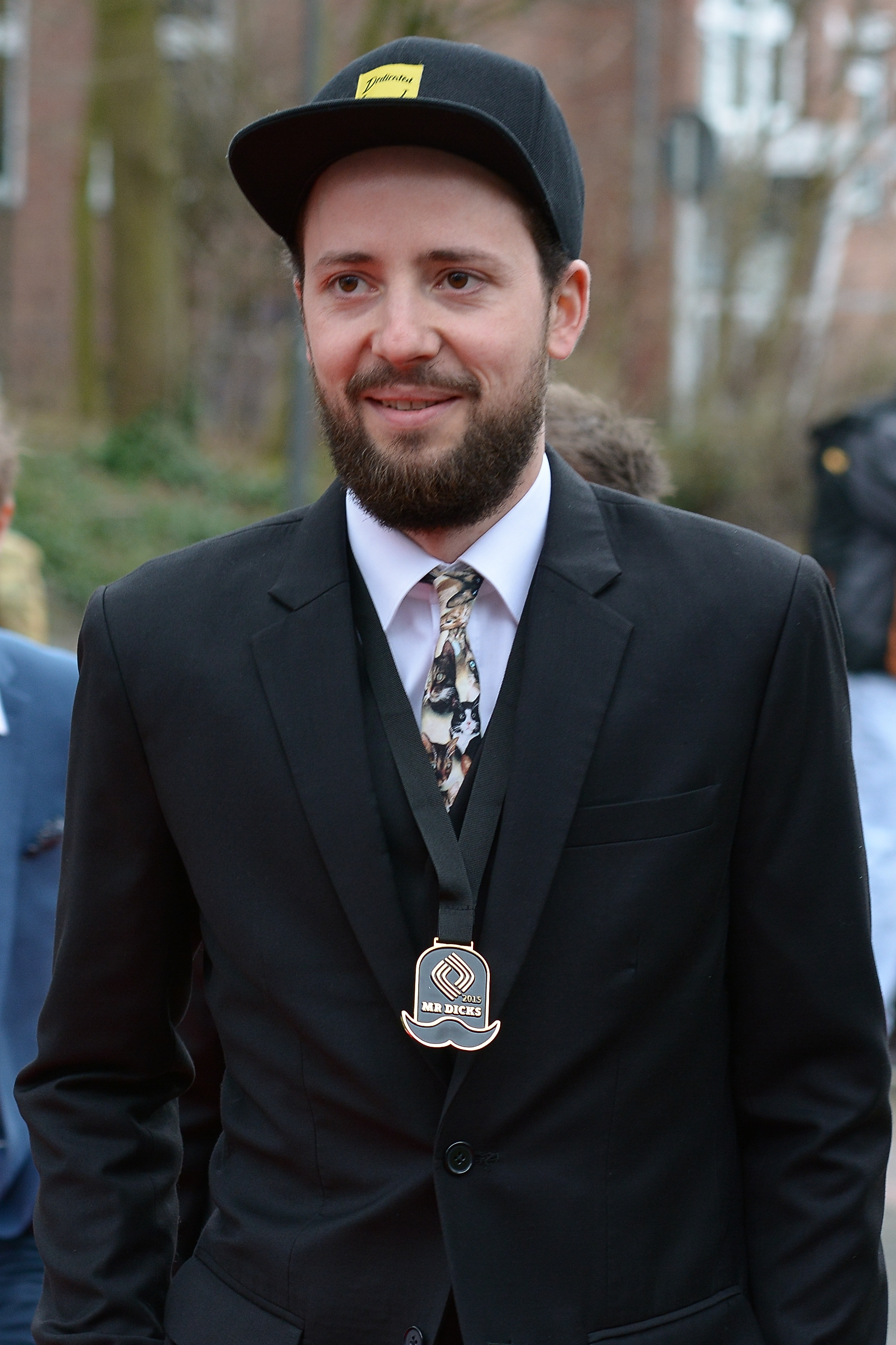
- Käßbohrer in 2015
- Born: October 30, 1983 (age 42); Biberach an der Riß
- Occupations: Producer; director
- Years active: 2006–
- Known for: bildundtonfabrik
- Works: How to Sell Drugs Online (Fast); Neo Magazin; King of Stonks

Philip Georg Käßbohrer (German: [fɪlɪp ge:ɔɐ̯k kɛsbo:ʁɐ]), born 30 October 1983, is a German film producer and director. He is the founder of the German film production company bildundtonfabrik and known for creating the shows Neo Magazin and How to Sell Drugs Online (Fast).

== Early life and education ==
Philip Georg Käßbohrer was born in Biberach an der Riß on 30 October 1983. After graduating from the gymnasium Pestalozzi-Gymnasium Biberach in 2004, he began a three-year audio-visual media designer apprenticeship with German public broadcasting organisation Südwestrundfunk. From 2007 until 2014, Käßbohrer studied Film and Television at Academy of Media Arts Cologne.

== Career ==
In 2006, Käßbohrer began directing and working on screenplays for television shows, such as his feature film Das Problem des Schnellstfluges. Later, Käßbohrer directed music videos for Get Well Soon and Le Corps Mince de Françoise. In 2012, he wrote and directed the Arte film Armadingen.

Following Armadingen, Käßbohrer and his classmate Matthias Murmann began working on a concept for a late-night talk show featuring Jan Böhmermann and Charlotte Roche. The show, broadcast on ZDFkultur, was met with generally favourable reviews, and received a nomination for the 2012 Grimme-Preis. Eventually, Käßbohrer and Murmann were awarded the 2012 Deutscher Fernsehpreis's Förderpreis, and founded the film production company bildundtonfabrik.

From 2013 until 2019, Käßbohrer was the executive producer of bildundtonfabrik's late-night talk show Neo Magazin, hosted by Jan Böhmermann. The show aired on ZDFneo from 2013 until 2015, and has aired on ZDF since 2015.

From 2014 until 2017, Philipp Käßbohrer was the executive producer of the WDR comedy show Die unwahrscheinlichsten Ereignisse im Leben von ..., and the infotainment show Mr. Dicks - Das erste wirklich subjektive Gesellschaftsmagazin that aired on 1Live and EinsFestival. Throughout the mid-2010s, Käßbohrer directed music videos such as Get Well Soon - It's Love and Maeckes - Gettin' Jiggy With it.

Since 2017, Käßbohrer has been producing the comedy show Kroymann, aired on ARD. The show is hosted by Maren Kroymann, who satirically discusses social topics and problems.

Starting in 2018, Käßbohrer and several other screenwriters began working on the screenplay for the first six episodes of the Netflix show How to Sell Drugs Online (Fast). Käßbohrer and Murmann have been the show's executive producers. The first season aired in 2019; season two and three followed in 2020 and 2021 respectively.

Also in 2018, Käßbohrer co-created WDR's online platform docupy, which includes documentary films on sociopolitical topics, directed by him.

In March 2020, during the first German COVID-19-lockdown, Käßbohrer created and produced the 15-episode comedy show Drinnen – im Internet sind alle gleich that aired on ZDFmediathek and ZDFneo. It featured Lavinia Wilson, Jana Pallaske, Barnaby Metschurat, and Victoria Trauttmansdorff. The show was not recorded in a film studio, instead, the actors recorded themselves at home using bildundtonfabrik equipment that was sent to them by mail.

Since 2020, Käßbohrer has been the executive producer of Die Carolin Kebekus Show. In 2021, Käßbohrer co-produced the documentary film Shiny Flakes: The Teenage Drug Lord about Maximilian Schmidt. Schmidt inspired Käßbohrer to write his How to Sell Drugs Online (Fast). Käßbohrer and Murmann will be the executive producers of Netflix's King of Stonks that is set to air in 2022.

== Filmography ==
- 2008: Gemeinsam Allein (director, screenplay)
- 2009: Der Tag, an dem Herrn Müller einfach nichts einfallen wollte (director)
- 2010: Armadingen (director, screenplay)
- 2013 - 2019: Neo Magazin Royale (director, producer)
- 2014: Die unwahrscheinlichsten Ereignisse im Leben von ... (director, writer, producer)
- 2015: Mr. Dicks - Das erste wirklich subjektive Gesellschaftsmagazin (director)
- 2016 - 2017: Schulz & Böhmermann (director, producer)
- 2017 - 2018: Kroymann (director, producer)
- 2018: Lass dich überwachen! Die Prism is a Dancer Show (creator)
- 2019: How to Sell Drugs Online (Fast) (producer, screenplay, creator)
- 2020: Die Carolin Kebekus Show (producer)
- 2020: Drinnen - Im Internet sind alle gleich (online series) (creator)
- 2021: Shiny Flakes: The Teenage Drug Lord (producer)
- 2021: King of Stonks (creator, producer, screenplay)
