= Land of Storms =

2014 Hungarian drama film directed by Ádám Császi

- Viharsarok
- Directed by: Ádám Császi
- Written by: Ádám Császi; Iván Szabó
- Produced by: Eszter Gyárfás; Viktória Petrányi
- Starring: András Sütő; Ádám Varga; Sebastian Urzendowsky
- Cinematography: Marcell Rév
- Edited by: Tamás Kollányi
- Music by: Csaba Kalotás
- Production companies: Proton Cinema; Café Film; I'm Film
- Distributed by: Cirko Film (Hungary); M-Appeal (international); TLA Releasing (U.S., UK)
- Release dates: 8 February 2014 (Berlin); 20 March 2014 (Hungary)
- Running time: 105 minutes
- Countries: Hungary; Germany
- Languages: Hungarian; German; English

Land of Storms (Hungarian: Viharsarok) is a Hungarian drama film, released in 2014. The feature film debut of director Ádám Császi, the film had its debut at the 64th Berlin International Film Festival.

The film stars András Sütő as Szabolcs, a young man who returns home to Hungary after quitting his budding football career in Germany, and begins a romantic and sexual relationship with Áron (Ádám Varga), an apprentice stonemason from a nearby town. The situation is complicated when Bernard (Sebastian Urzendowsky), Szabolcs' former roommate in Germany, arrives to convince him to return to football training.

The intro to the film states that this was based on a true story.

== Plot ==
Szabolcs, a talented but passionless football player in an amateur German team, mangles a match and is sent off with a red card. As a result, a league scout leaves, he picks a fight with his best friend Bernard and quits the team. He returns to a dilapidated family home in rural Hungary to farm bees instead. One night, he catches Áron, a local from the nearby village who lives with and cares for his invalid mother, attempting to steal his scooter. He knocks Áron off, knocking him out in the process, and stays with him until he wakes. Instead of calling the police, Szabolcs has Áron help repair the house. They become friends and Szabolcs joins the locals playing football.

One night, after going swimming and drinking too much, they lie on the road and Szabolcs gives a barely-conscious Áron a handjob. Áron is clearly confused about how he feels about the encounter. Despite this, he keeps returning to help Szabolcs with the house and their relationship deepens. Eventually, Áron tells his mother about Szabolcs, who in turn tells others, raising the ire of the conservative community.

After some of the villagers beat Szabolcs during a football game and Áron refuses to stand up for him, Szabolcs calls Bernard. Though Áron soon returns to him, Bernard also arrives in Hungary, creating tension. Bernard expresses an interest in a relationship with Szabolcs and tries to convince him to return to Germany to play football.

Eventually the community sentiment turns against Áron as well. After he is also assaulted by his friends and criticized by his mother, he moves in with Szabolcs. He and Bernard compete for Szabolcs' attention. Eventually Szabolcs chooses to stay in Hungary with Áron, and Bernard returns to Germany.

Áron returns home to find his mother near death after he was not there to take care of her. He takes her to hospital where she remains in a coma. Unable to deal with the guilt of not being there for her, combined with the animosity of the villagers, he returns to Szabolcs. After a final sexual encounter, he mortally stabs Szabolcs in the chest and flees the farmhouse.

== Cast ==
- András Sütő as Szabolcs
- Ádám Varga as Áron
- Sebastian Urzendowsky as Bernard
- Enikő Börcsök as Áron's mother
- Lajos Ottó Horváth as Szabolcs's father
