= Crime Scene Cleaner =

German television series

- German: Der Tatortreiniger
- Genre: Comedy
- Created by: Ingrid Lausund, Arne Feldhusen, Bjarne Mädel
- Written by: Mizzi Meyer (Ingrid Lausund)
- Directed by: Arne Feldhusen
- Starring: Bjarne Mädel
- Composer: Carsten Meyer
- Country of origin: Germany
- Original language: German
- No. of seasons: 7
- No. of episodes: 31

Production
- Producer: Wolfgang Henningsen
- Camera setup: Christian Leschner
- Production companies: Studio Hamburg (season 1 & 4); Nordfilm GmbH (season 2–3); Letterbox Filmproductions GmbH (season 5–7)

Original release
- Network: Norddeutscher Rundfunk
- Release: 23 December 2011 – 19 December 2018

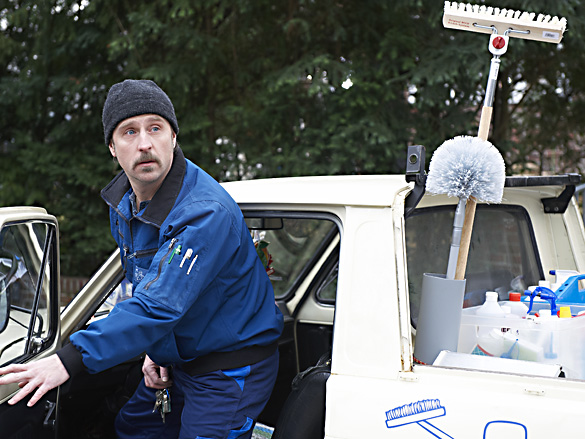
Bjarne Mädel as Heiko Schotte (2012)

Crime Scene Cleaner (German: Der Tatortreiniger) is a German comedy TV series broadcast by the NDR/ARD, starring Bjarne Mädel as the title protagonist. It was directed by Arne Feldhusen and written by Mizzi Meyer. The show was broadcast from 2011 until 2018, spanning 31 episodes over seven series.

Crime Scene Cleaner can be described as a mixture of chamber play, sitcom and comedy of manners. Guest actors include Sandra Hüller, Florian Lukas, Matthias Brandt and Fritzi Haberlandt.

== Plot ==
Bjarne Mädel plays the crime scene cleaner Heiko "Schotty" Schotte. He works as a facility cleaner (specialized on crime scenes) whose job it is to remove the last traces of the living, in and around Hamburg. It is not a crime thriller nor detective story, it rather takes a closer look at the work of the crime scene cleaner in a humorous way, where the criminal cases have a rather subordinate importance. The main focus is laid on scenes which mirror the style of a chamber play. Those scenes are garnished with situational humour, which results from Schotty's interaction with the spouses, acquaintances of the victim or in some cases even with the ghost of the one victim. In multiple episodes Schotty's deep connection to the football team Hamburger SV is either briefly mentioned, or partially becomes the in-depth subject of the conversation.

== Foreign broadcasting ==
After the video on demand rights were already sold to Canal+ in France in the autumn of 2013, the Studio Hamburg sold the rights for broadcasting and DVD releases to the American television station MHz Network. Since 5 December 2014, the network aired season 1 and 2 of the show under the title Crime Scene Cleaner in the original German soundtrack with English subtitles. The episodes 1 to 10 were released on DVD on 27 January 2015.

An adaptation for BBC One titled The Cleaner starring Greg Davies was broadcast in 2021, with Helena Bonham Carter, David Mitchell, Ruth Madeley and Stephanie Cole as guest actors.

== DVD releases ==
The first season of the show was released on DVD on 9 March 2012. On 7 June 2013, the second season DVD as well as the Blu-ray complete edition, containing the first two seasons, were released. On 10 October 2014 the third season DVD was released, which contained the not-yet-aired episodes. On 13 March 2015 the fourth season was released as well as the limited collectors edition “Böse Dose” (eng.: Evil Can), which contained all episodes that were aired by then on three Blu-ray discs. The fifth season was released on 11 March 2016. On 13 October 2017, the sixth season appeared on DVD and Blu-ray. The final season was released on 25 January 2019. A complete edition on 7 DVDs followed at the end of the year.

Der Tatortreiniger is also available on multiple video on demand services like MhZ, Amazon Prime Video, Netflix, Google Play and iTunes. All episodes also appeared freely accessible on the VOD platform of ARD.

== Recurring cast ==
- Bjarne Mädel as Heiko “Schotty” Schotte (31 episodes)
- Jörg Pose as undertaker Lukas (4 episodes)
- Peer Martiny as undertaker Heiner (4 episodes)
- Jule Böwe as Merle (3 episodes)
- Charly Hübner as Alexander Bukow (3 episodes)
- Olli Schulz as Didi (3 episodes)

Many of the guest actors return in the final episode.

Composer Carsten Meyer (episodes 7 and 24), the former football player Uwe Seeler (episode 22) and rapper Marteria (episode 31) have cameo appearances.

== Episodes ==
=== Season 1 (2011) ===
1. Ganz normale Jobs ("Completely Normal Jobs")
2. Spuren ("Traces")
3. Nicht über mein Sofa ("Not on My Sofa")
4. Geschmackssache ("A Matter of Taste")

=== Season 2 (2012) ===
5. Über den Wolken ("Above the Clouds")
6. Die Challenge ("The Challenge")
7. Schottys Kampf ("Schotty's Struggle")
8. Angehörige ("Relatives")
9. Auftrag aus dem Jenseits ("Assignment from the Beyond")

=== Season 3 (2014) ===
10. Fleischfresser ("Carnivores")
11. Schweine ("Pigs")
12. Carpe Diem ("Seize the Day")
13. Ja, ich will ("Yes, I Do")

=== Season 4 (2014) ===
14. Wattolümpiade ("Mud Olympics")
15. Der Putzer ("The Cleaner")
16. Damit muss man rechnen ("Expect the Worst")
17. Der Fluch ("The Curse")
18. Tauschgeschäfte ("Barter Transactions")

=== Season 5 (2015) ===
19. Bestattungsvorsorge ("Funeral Pre-Arrangements")
20. Das freie Wochenende ("The Weekend Off")
21. Pfirsichmelba ("Peach Melba")
22. Anbieterwechsel ("Switching Providers")
23. E.M.M.A. 206
24. Freunde ("Friends")

=== Season 6 (2016) ===
25. Sind Sie sicher? ("Are You Sure?")
26. Özgür ("Free" [from Turkish])
27. Schluss mit lustig ("Fun's over")

=== Season 7 (2018) ===
28. Currywurst
29. Rebellen ("Rebels")
30. Der Kopf ("The Head")
31. Einundreißig ("Thirty-One")

== Awards ==
Der Tatortreiniger won several awards, including the German Television Award, two Grimme Awards and a Jupiter Award. In 2016, the show was nominated for the Rose d'Or.

- 2019: German Television Award – Best Writing (Ingrid Lausund alias Mizzi Meyer)
- 2019: German Screen Actors Awards – Best Actor in a Comedy Role (Bjarne Mädel)
- 2013: Jupiter Award – Best German TV Series
- 2013: Grimme Award for the episode Schotty’s Kampf (Mizzi Meyer, Arne Feldhusen, Bjarne Mädel)
- 2012: Grimme Award (Mizzi Meyer, Arne Feldhusen, Bjarne Mädel, Benjamin Ikes)
- 2012: German Comedy Award – Best Comedy Series
- 2012: German Comedy Award – Best Actor (Bjarne Mädel)

== See also ==
- The Cleaner – a British comedy television series featuring Greg Davies, based on Der Tatortreiniger.
- Mr & Mrs Murder – an Australian comedy television series, about a couple who are crime scene cleaners.
