= The Tower (2012 German film) =

- Directed by: Christian Schwochow
- Starring: Sebastian Urzendowsky; Jan Josef Liefers; Nadja Uhl; Claudia Michelsen
- Country of origin: Germany
- Original language: German

Production
- Running time: 180 minutes

Original release
- Network: Das Erste
- Release: 3 October 2012

The Tower (German: Der Turm) is a 2012 German TV drama film based on the eponymous 2008 novel by Uwe Tellkamp. It is about life and history in Dresden between 1982 and 1989 in the German Democratic Republic, GDR and its last years before demonstrations, the time of Die Wende (the turning from former socialistic government with Stasi-elements to democracy), the tearing down of the wall and before German reunification.

== Cast ==
- Hans-Uwe Bauer as Ulrich Rohde
- Klaus Bieligk as Heinz Schiffner
- Martin Bruchmann as Jens Ansorge
- David C. Bunners as Der Ältere (Stasi)
- Josephin Busch as Reina Kossmann
- Claudia Geisler-Bading as Frau Kolb
- Andreas Genschmar as Lagerarbeiter
- Bettina Kenney as Student
- Janusz Kocaj as Falk Truschler
- Steffi Kühnert as Barbara Rohde
- Ramona Kunze-Libnow as Oberschwester
- Jan Josef Liefers as Richard Hoffmann
- Juergen Maurer as Lawyer Sperber
- Thorsten Merten as Manfred Weniger
- Claudia Michelsen as Anne Hoffmann
- Sergej Moya as Ezzo Rohde
- Annika Olbrich as Franziska
- Peter Prager as Direktor Fahner
- Bruno Renne as Phillip
- Lea Ruckpaul as Verena
- Udo Schenk as Kohler
- Götz Schubert as Meno Rohde
- Ernst-Georg Schwill as Chefarzt Müller
- Martin Seifert as Herr Schnürchel
- Christian Sengewald as Thomas Wernstein
- Peter Sodann as Max Barsano
- Stephanie Stumph as Ina Rohde
- Valery Tscheplanowa as Judith Schevola
- Nadja Uhl as Josta Fischer
- Sebastian Urzendowsky as Christian Hoffmann
- Antonio Wannek as Stefan Kretzschmar
- Carina Wiese as Regine
