= How to Sell Drugs Online (Fast) =

German comedy-drama television series

- Genre: Comedy drama; Crime; Dark comedy; Coming-of-age; Techno-thriller
- Created by: Philipp Käßbohrer; Matthias Murmann
- Written by: Sebastian Colley; Philipp Käßbohrer; Stefan Titze
- Starring: Maximilian Mundt; Anna Lena Klenke; Danilo Kamperidis; Damian Hardung; Luna Baptiste Schaller; Leonie Wesselow; Bjarne Mädel
- Composers: Konstantin Gropper; Markus Winter
- Country of origin: Germany
- Original language: German
- No. of seasons: 4
- No. of episodes: 24

Production
- Executive producers: Philipp Käßbohrer; Matthias Murmann; Lars Montag
- Producers: Stefan Titze; André Zoch
- Cinematography: Armin Franzen; Borris Kehl
- Editors: Marc Schubert; Rainer Nigrelli; Alex Kutka; Christoph Cepok
- Camera setup: Single-camera
- Running time: 24–39 minutes
- Production company: bildundtonfabrik

Original release
- Network: Netflix
- Release: 31 May 2019 – 8 April 2025

How to Sell Drugs Online (Fast) is a German coming-of-age dark crime comedy television series co-created by Philipp Käßbohrer and Matthias Murmann. The first season, consisting of six episodes, was released on 31 May 2019, on Netflix. The series stars Maximilian Mundt, Lena Klenke, Danilo Kamperidis, Damian Hardung, Luna Baptiste Schaller, Leonie Wesselow and Bjarne Mädel. The second season premiered on Netflix on 21 July 2020. On 28 July 2020, Netflix renewed the series for a third season. It premiered on July 27, 2021. On 12 August 2022, for dwdl.de, creators Matthias Murmann and Philipp Käßbohrer said in an interview that Netflix gave the green light for a fourth season. The fourth and final season was released on April 8, 2025.

A spin-off prequel feature film, Buba, with Bjarne Mädel reprising his role as the titular character from the first season, was released by Netflix on August 3, 2022.

== Overview ==
How to Sell Drugs Online (Fast) is set in fictional Rinseln, North Rhine-Westphalia, Germany, and told from the perspective of high-school outcast and nerd Moritz Zimmermann. The series follows Moritz and his friend Lenny Sander attempting to rekindle Moritz's love for ex-girlfriend Lisa Novak, through selling ecstasy online. Starting off as a small time business, it quickly spirals out of control and Moritz and Lenny learn to deal with the consequences of large scale drug trafficking.

The series is inspired by a true story that took place in Leipzig in 2015. Maximilian Schmidt, the inspiration for the television series, was sentenced to seven years in prison.

== Cast and characters ==
- Maximilian Mundt as Moritz Zimmerman, a nerdy high school student and CEO of MyDrugs. His desire for power and control from MyDrugs causes as many failures for the group as successes. He acts as the narrator throughout the series, telling his story from within prison.
- Lena Klenke as Lisa Novak, Moritz's ex-girlfriend. Her liking for ecstasy is the main catalyst in Moritz's plans to take her back.
- Danilo Kamperidis as Lenny Sander, Moritz's best friend. An adept hacker and video game junkie, he becomes the CTO of MyDrugs. He is a wheelchair user as a result of osteosarcoma.
- Damian Hardung as Daniel Riffert, Lisa's presumptive boyfriend and typical high-school jock. Whilst a rival to Moritz early on, he later becomes a partner in MyDrugs.
- Luna Baptiste Schaller as Gerda Schwerdfeger, one of Lisa's friends at school, who takes a liking to Moritz.
- Leonie Wesselow as Fritzi Neuhaus, another one of Lisa's friends.
- Bjarne Mädel as Jakob 'Buba' Otto (season 1), a small-time drug dealer who is the main source of ecstasy in Rinseln. He owns a local farm which is the centre of the Albanian gang present in Rinseln. He is the primary antagonist for Season 1 and the protagonist of the prequel film Buba.
- Roland Riebeling as Jens Zimmermann, Moritz's father and a police officer. He is part of the investigation in stopping the drug situation in Rinseln and later on, MyDrugs.
- Jolina Amely Trinks as Marie Zimmermann, Moritz's younger sister. The more social of the Zimmermann family, she has a moderate size following on Instagram. She is also an avid horse rider, riding at the stables owned by the Albanian gang.
- Jonathan Frakes as Himself, reprising his part as host of the show Beyond Belief: Fact or Fiction
- Lena Urzendowsky as Milena 'Kira' Bechtholz (seasons 2–4), Lenny's online girlfriend. In Season 2, she becomes part of Lenny's life and becomes infatuated with MyDrugs.
- Maren Kroymann as Doro Otto (seasons 2–4), Buba's mother and leader of the Albanian gang.
- Langston Uibel as Joseph Kammerlander (season 3)
- Erik Range, A.K.A. Gronkh, as himself, a YouTuber in Season 3 Episode 3, playing Animal Crossing.

=== English dubbing ===
Season 1 was dubbed twice, first by VSI in Los Angeles and then by VSI in London. All following seasons only feature a British dub. The first version was directed by Sylvainne Chebance, the script was adapted by Claudia Zielke. The second dub was directed by David John. Starting with season 2, the script was adapted by Zoe Clarke. The American dub has since been withdrawn from circulation, with only the dubbing credits remaining at the end of each episode from season 1.

Role	Actor	Voice actor (United States)	Voice actor (United Kingdom)
Moritz Zimmerman	Maximilian Mundt	Maximilian Mundt	Harry McEntire
Lisa Novak	Lena Klenke	Lena Klenke	Rebecca Norfolk
Lenny Sander	Danilo Kamperidis	Danilo Kamperidis	Ethan Lawrence
Daniel Riffert	Damian Hardung	N/A	Joe Gaminara
Gerda Schwerdfeger	Luna Baptiste Schaller	Luna Baptiste Schaller	Natalie Elisha-Welsh
Fritzi Neuhaus	Leonie Wesselow	Leonie Wesselow	Freya Fumic
Jakob 'Buba' Otto	Bjarne Mädel	Bjarne Mädel	Dean Williamson
Jens Zimmermann	Roland Riebeling	Roland Riebeling	Paul Panting
Marie Zimmermann	Jolina Amely Trinks	Jolina Amely Trinks	Phoebe Farnham
Jonathan Frakes
Milena 'Kira' Bechtholz	Lena Urzendowsky	/	Eleanor Bennett

== Episodes ==
Series	Episodes	Originally released
1	6	31 May 2019
2	6	21 July 2020
3	6	27 July 2021
4	6	8 April 2025

=== Season 1 (2019) ===
No. overall	No. in season	Title	Directed by	Written by	Original release date
1	1	"Nerd Today, Boss Tomorrow"	Lars Montag	Sebastian Colley, Philipp Käßbohrer, Stefan Titze	31 May 2019
Moritz Zimmerman, a high-school outcast, is dumped by his girlfriend, Lisa Novak, upon her return to Germany after a year studying in America. Learning that Lisa has taken up ecstasy during her time in America, and has seemingly set her eyes on high-school jock Dan Riffert, Moritz enlists the help of his friend Lenny Sandler to win her back. Moritz finds Dan's dealer, Jakob 'Buba' Otto, and buys the entire stock of ecstasy in hopes that Dan will have none to offer Lisa. Later on, Moritz crashes Lisa's party to win her back, only to be humiliated in front of everyone by Dan. In debt from Buba, and left with a full bag of ecstasy, Moritz plans to sell them online.
2	2	"Life's Not Fair, Get Used to It"	Lars Montag	Sebastian Colley, Philipp Käßbohrer, Stefan Titze	31 May 2019
Lisa's parents find an ecstasy pill from the previous night's party, so she contacts Dan to help her. As Moritz has access to her Facebook account, he deletes the messages to and from Dan, and he goes round to help instead. Moritz then reconfigures his and Lenny's game marketplace, 'MyTems', to sell ecstasy pills on the dark web under the name 'MyDrugs'. Lenny is reluctant at first due to being fed up of Moritz's failed attempts, but he is won over and drug orders start to come in. Dan is questioned by police over his possession of ecstasy and is asked to reveal his dealer or face a sentence.
3	3	"Failure is Not an Option"	Lars Montag	Sebastian Colley, Philipp Käßbohrer, Stefan Titze	31 May 2019
Buba tracks down Moritz and Lenny, and demands the money that Moritz owes. Finding out about MyDrugs, Buba asks for €10,000 from the profits made. It turns out that whilst orders are high, the reviews for the pills are rated low, and Moritz accepts help from a user called 'PurpleRain'. In an attempt to offer the pills to Lisa, Moritz is turned down, and it is revealed that the substance inside Buba's supply is PMA, of which Lenny experiences the side effects first hand. Dan questions Lisa over her ignoring him, which Lisa denies. Dan attempts to text again, but Lisa sees Moritz delete them, and calls him out over the school intercom. Buba is arrested and placed into detention, and Moritz and Lenny pick up the first package from PurpleRain.
4	4	"If This is Reality, I'm Not Interested"	Arne Feldhusen	Sebastian Colley, Philipp Käßbohrer, Stefan Titze	31 May 2019
This episode concentrates on the emotional problems that the characters face. Moritz' actions leave him being vilified throughout the high-school, being blocked by Lisa on social media, and are starting to strain his relationship with Lenny. Moritz and Lenny plan to move MyDrugs from the dark web to the clear web. Furthermore, Moritz is contacted by the police and asked by his policeman father to help them crack Buba's laptop. As the information on Buba's laptop contains links to Lenny and Moritz, Moritz deletes the contents, feigning to the police that the contents are lost. Lenny deals with the possibility that his mother may replace him with a foster child when he passes, and Lisa and Dan deal with problems relating to stress and social status through therapy.
5	5	"Score Big or Don't Score at All"	Arne Feldhusen	Sebastian Colley, Philipp Käßbohrer, Stefan Titze	31 May 2019
MyDrugs is ready to go live on the clear web, and both Moritz and Lenny celebrate with a formal dinner. Moritz reveals to Lenny that he is making a deal with manufacturer GoodTimes in Rotterdam to increase the product range of MyDrugs, but Lenny snaps at Moritz, claiming that Moritz has forgotten the relationship they both had and is only interested in business. Fed up, Lenny leaves Moritz. Moritz accepts an invitation to classmate Gerda's birthday party and sees Dan and Lisa kiss. Moritz leaves in a sulk, and allows MyDrugs to go live on the clear web. Gerda overdoses on ecstasy, and Buba (now out of detention due to the lack of evidence against him) locates Lenny.
6	6	"If You Are the Smartest One in the Room, You're in the Wrong Room"	Arne Feldhusen	Sebastian Colley, Philipp Käßbohrer, Stefan Titze	31 May 2019
Lenny has gone missing, and Moritz attempts to contact him after finding out about Gerda's overdose. He enlists Dan to help find Lenny, and they find him captured at Buba's farm. A rescue attempt fails, and all three are imprisoned by Buba. As Buba attempts to kill one of the trio, Lenny pulls out a concealed Liberator and misfires at Buba, which Buba takes and then kills himself by accident. The three decide to put differences aside and work together on MyDrugs. MyDrugs on the clear web is an instant hit. GoodTimes decides to send the pills directly, and kills middle-man PurpleRain. Lisa and Moritz make amends, with Lisa telling Dan that their relationship should be on 'pause'. The credits show older versions of Lisa and Lenny in doubt of Moritz's version of events. Lenny begins to tell what happened afterwards.

=== Season 2 (2020) ===
No. overall	No. in season	Title	Directed by	Written by	Original release date
7	1	"Think Different"	Mia Spengler	Sebastian Colley, Mats Frey, Philipp Käßbohrer, Stefan Titze, Natalie Thomas	21 July 2020
MyDrugs has turned into more of a success than the boys ever imagined, notorious for their operations and the mystery behind the ring leader, m1000 (Moritz). But the trio are unhappy with continuing the website and want out of the trafficking life, intending GoodTimes to take control. Lisa has shown an intense dislike for her father's partner. Dan's influence in the group causes Lenny to have an impromptu date with Kira, his online sweetheart. Embarrassed to show his true self to her, Lenny uses Dan as his catfish on the date, but she manages to spot Lenny regardless, and the date goes well. Moritz goes to Rotterdam to try and negotiate a deal, but changes his mind about giving over control and chooses to extend the current business with GoodTimes. He agrees that the trio will develop a fake business in order to launder the money earned. Moritz is shocked when he returns home to find out that Lisa will be living with him.
8	2	"Where Do You Want to Go Today?"	Mia Spengler	Sebastian Colley, Mats Frey, Philipp Käßbohrer, Stefan Titze, Natalie Thomas	21 July 2020
MyDrugs operations have proved difficult with the introduction of Lisa into Moritz's homelife. Moritz is reluctant to tell Lisa the truth after her mother was admitted to rehab, but Lenny has let Kira know of MyDrugs, and hopes that the fake business will prolong his life - already hampered by his bone cancer. Back in Rotterdam, Moritz's initial ideas fail to impress GoodTimes. Dan, however, steps in and introduces 'BonusLife', a vitamin supplement service for gamers. GoodTimes praises the idea, but Moritz disapproves, and is worried Dan will undermine him as the leader, but he begrudgingly goes along with the plan. Unable to admit to Lisa his involvement with MyDrugs, and their lives starting to complicate one another, he decides to break up with her at a party.
9	3	"Inspired by Real Life"	Mia Spengler	Sebastian Colley, Mats Frey, Philipp Käßbohrer, Stefan Titze, Natalie Thomas	21 July 2020
Moritz is not taking the breakup well, whilst Lisa has moved to Fritzi's house. The results of a personality test at school inspire Moritz, Dan and Lenny to become better in their business, until Lenny mentions that Kira should join the team. Scared over the fact that she might leak their identities to the world, Moritz discovers Kira's true identity: Milena Bechtholz, a runaway teen who blackmails porn addicts for bitcoins. Moritz tracks down Kira, who has 'taken a break' from Lenny. She admits to hiding her past from him, and calls their relationship off, blocking Lenny on every platform. This tension reaches breaking point when Lenny and Dan find news from Lisa that Kira and Moritz kissed. Dan and Moritz are also shocked when Lenny admits to telling Kira of their involvement with MyDrugs. During a call with GoodTimes, Buba's former gang (the Albanians) find the trio.
10	4	"Buy It. Sell It. Love It."	Arne Feldhusen	Sebastian Colley, Mats Frey, Philipp Käßbohrer, Stefan Titze, Natalie Thomas	21 July 2020
A tense standoff with Buba's mother, Doro, only proves worse for the trio, forcing them to deal cocaine on the side and acquire 50,000 euros for the Albanians as retribution for Buba's death. They decide to mix the bitcoins earned with cash, setting up a separate bank account for the gang to use. Things get complicated with the introduction of Susi, a former police dog who becomes part of the Zimmerman residence. Susi sniffs out the ecstasy stash and ruins it, so Moritz and Lenny take her to the forest and abandon her. Dan finds out he may have to repeat the school year if he fails his Biology exam for his Abitur, so he enlists Moritz to help him. Attempting to meet Dan falls apart when Jens finds out about the drugs. Although Moritz manages to hide his association with MyDrugs, Jens notes that the federal police are starting to get involved in finding the mastermind behind MyDrugs and acknowledges Mortitz's link to Buba. Kira and Lenny manage to reunite after Kira admits to lying, with Lenny allowing Kira to work on the laundering scheme.
11	5	"Move Fast and Break Things"	Arne Feldhusen	Sebastian Colley, Mats Frey, Philipp Käßbohrer, Stefan Titze, Natalie Thomas	21 July 2020
Lisa is shocked to find out the truth behind MyDrugs, insisting that Moritz should do what he should've done originally, get out. Since the destruction of the office, the reputation of MyDrugs has faltered with orders delayed and copycat dealers popping up. Angered at Moritz's failure to help him for his revision, Dan refuses to speak to Moritz. GoodTimes stages a visit to Moritz, offering him a position in Rotterdam at the cost of losing Lenny and Dan. Giving the 50,000 euros to the Albanian gang only cements them as valuable partners in Moritz's mind. Dan finds out his family is bankrupt, and Lenny manages to get approved for an experimental therapy. In a tense discussion over the deal, Moritz admits to Lenny and Dan that threats of being killed were a ruse, and that they could have gotten out of trafficking, but Moritz chose not to, out of greed. Dismayed, Lenny kicks him out of MyDrugs. When Moritz joins the Albanians on a hunt, he accidentally wounds Susi. Bringing her back home, he finds out that the office has been completely cleared out, and his former partners have ended their association with him.
12	6	"Don't Be Evil."	Arne Feldhusen	Sebastian Colley, Mats Frey, Philipp Käßbohrer, Stefan Titze, Natalie Thomas	21 July 2020
Skipping his exam, Moritz takes back control of MyDrugs by hacking into Lenny's account, and accepts the office deal in Rotterdam. Back at school, Lisa manages to delay the mock Abitur exam with a minor arson in the bathroom, giving Moritz a chance to sit it. A GoodTimes member, Mia, gets personal with Moritz and states that she is going to resign. However, associate Maarten kills her. Moritz manages to buy the family house, much to his family's happiness. With no money going to his account after Moritz stopped his bitcoin address being linked, Lenny is forced to cancel the experimental treatment. Back at school, Moritz tries to warn that Maarten and the rest of GoodTimes will kill the three of them if they try and stop the trafficking, but Lenny and Dan don't believe him and chastise him for mixing business with friendship. Maarten attempts to kill Lenny and Dan, but is stopped by the Albanians (who Moritz had sent for). Kira manages to salvage the former business under a new name, CandyBay. The final nail in the coffin for Moritz's and Lenny's relationship is struck when Lenny decides to use a killswitch, ending MyDrugs once and for all. At the end, the 'interview' room is revealed to be an interrogation room. When the interviewer asks if he wanted friendship or business at the end of it all, Moritz simply states that his time is up, before getting handcuffed by the German police.

=== Season 3 (2021) ===
No. overall	No. in season	Title	Directed by	Written by	Original release date
13	1	"A single failure, a little slip"	Arne Feldhusen	Sebastian Colley, Philipp Käßbohrer, Natalie Thomas, Mats Frey	27 July 2021
14	2	"A misdemeanor, a little trip"	Arne Feldhusen	Michael Schilling, Philipp Käßbohrer, Mats Frey, Natalie Thomas	27 July 2021
15	3	"Does this condemn me, lock me away?"	Arne Feldhusen	Peter Furrer, Philipp Käßbohrer, Stefan Titze, Natalie Thomas, Mats Frey	27 July 2021
16	4	"Before you turn the key, I have one more thing to say"	Arne Feldhusen	Michael Schilling, Philipp Käßbohrer, Mats Frey, Natalie Thomas, Stefan Titze	27 July 2021
17	5	"To make amends, maybe be friends"	Arne Feldhusen	Mats Frey, Stefan Titze, Philipp Käßbohrer, Natalie Thomas	27 July 2021
18	6	"Everybody gets a second chance"	Arne Feldhusen	Stefan Titze, Mats Frey, Philipp Käßbohrer, Natalie Thomas	27 July 2021

=== Season 4 (2025) ===
No. overall	No. in season	Title	Directed by	Written by	Original release date
19	1	"That Can't Happen."	Arne Feldhusen	Michael Schilling	8 April 2025
20	2	"That Doesn't Happen on My Machine."	Arne Feldhusen	Lena Tusche, Denise Harkavy	8 April 2025
21	3	"That Shouldn't Happen!"	Arne Feldhusen	Michael Schilling, Sebastian Huber	8 April 2025
22	4	"Why Does That Happen?"	Facundo Scalerandi	Patrick Stenzel	8 April 2025
23	5	"Oh, I See."	Facundo Scalerandi	Sebastian Colley	8 April 2025
24	6	"How Did That Ever Work?"	Facundo Scalerandi	Sebastian Colley	8 April 2025

== Production ==
=== Development ===
On 25 October 2018, it was announced that Netflix had given the production a series order for a six-episode first season. The series is created by Philipp Käßbohrer and Matthias Murmann who will be credited as executive producers. Production companies involved with the series were slated to consist of bildundtonfabrik. On July 9, 2019, the series was renewed by Netflix for a second season, which was released on 21 July 2020. On 28 July 2020, Netflix renewed the series for a third season, which premiered on 27 July 2021. On 12 August 2022, for dwdl.de, creators Matthias Murmann and Philipp Käßbohrer announced that Netflix gave the green light for a fourth season.

=== Casting ===
Alongside the series order announcement, it was confirmed that Maximilian Mundt, Anna Lena Klenke, Danilo Kamperidis, Damian Hardung, Luna Baptiste Schaller, Leonie Wesselow and Bjarne Mädel would star in the series. In June 2020, Lena Urzendowsky was cast in the role of Kira on the second season. On 28 July 2020, Langston Uibel was announced to have joined the third season's new main cast.

=== Filming ===
On 17 December 2018, Netflix announced that filming for the first season was completed. Principal photography for the second season took place on location in Bonn, Germany in 2019. Filming for the third season took place on location in Cologne, Germany in 2020.

=== Premiere ===
On 6 April 2019, the series held its official premiere with the screening of the first two episodes at the Cannes International Series Festival in Cannes, France.

== Release ==
=== Marketing ===
On 6 April 2019, the teaser trailer for the series was released. On 17 May 2019, the official trailer for the series was released by Netflix. On 23 June 2020, the official trailer for the second season was released. On 6 July 2021, the official trailer for the third season was released. On 30 January 2025, the official trailer for the fourth and final season was released.

== Spin-offs ==
On August 3, 2022, Netflix released Buba, a spin-off prequel film featuring the character of the same name from the 2019 first season of How to Sell Drugs Online (Fast), with Bjarne Mädel reprising his role.
