= Maren Kroymann =

German actress and singer (born 1949)

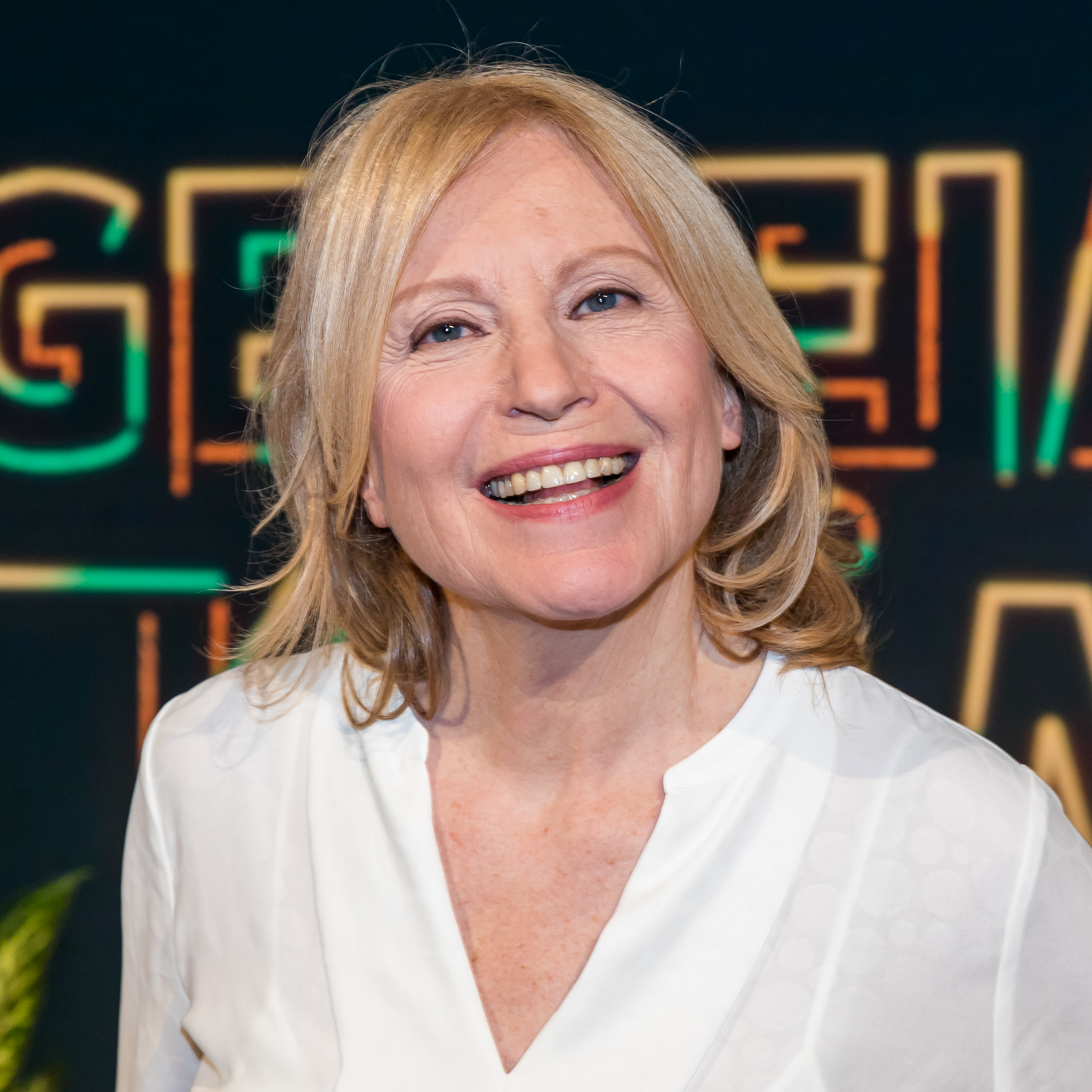
- Kroymann in 2018
- Born: 19 July 1949 (age 77); Walsrode, West Germany
- Education: University of Tübingen
- Occupations: Actress, comedian, singer
- Years active: 1967–present

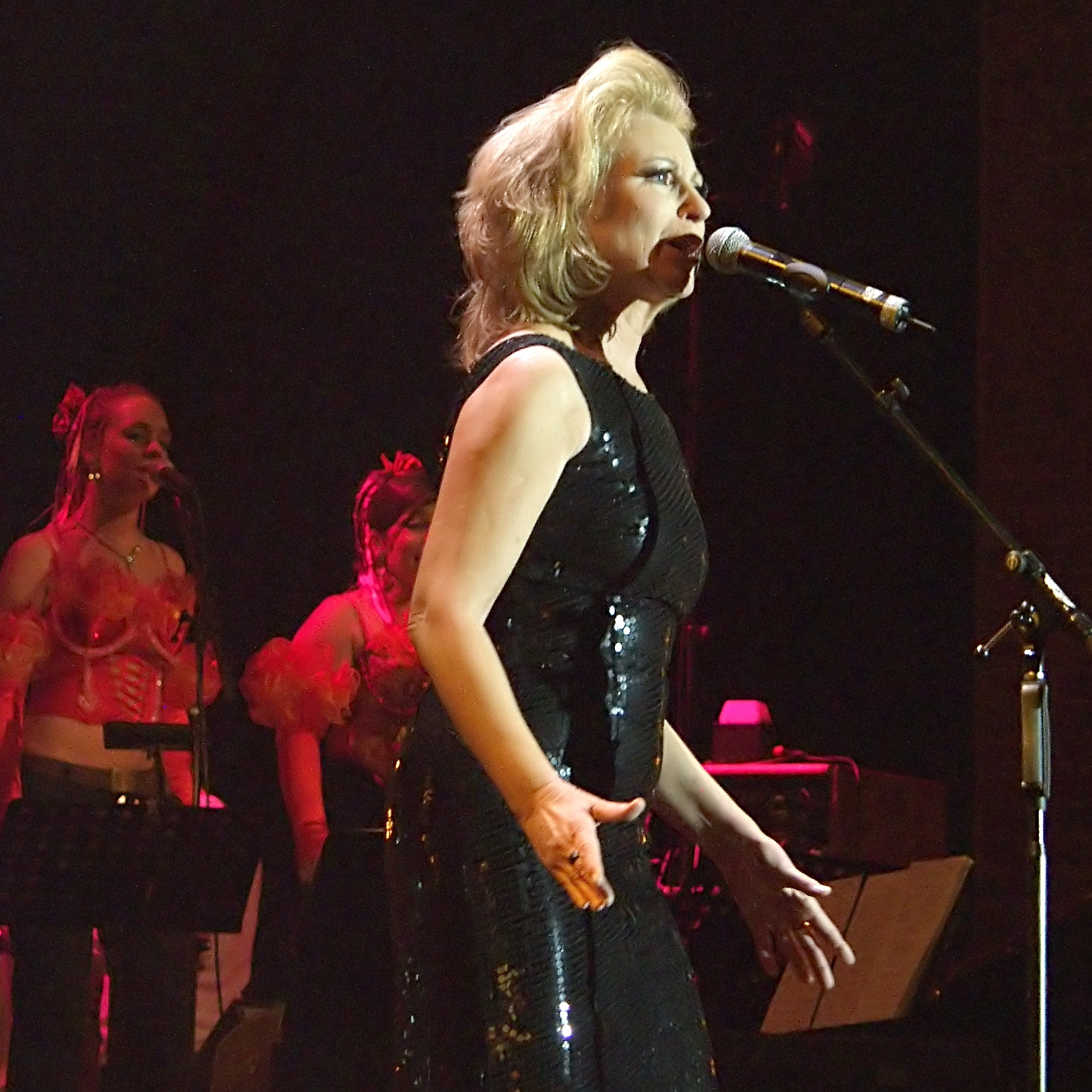
Maren Kroymann in 2006 at the Charity concert "Cover me" at E-Werk, Cologne, Germany

Maren Kroymann (German: [ˈmaː.ʁən ˈkʁɔɪ̯.man]; born 19 July 1949) is a German actress, comedian and singer.

== Career ==
Kroymann was born in Walsrode. She studied English, Roman studies, and American studies at University of Tübingen. After spending time in Paris and the United States, Kroymann moved to Berlin, where she sang in the Hanns-Eisler Choir. As Nachtschwester Kroymann (1993–1997), she was the first woman in German public television with her own satirical show. In recent years, Kroymann has appeared in a number of German films.

== Awards ==
- 2019 Rose d'Or Lifetime Achievement Award
- 2019 Grimme Preis for comedy show Kroymann
- 2020 Carl-Zuckmayer-Medaille
- 2020 Bayerischer Kabarettpreis (Honorary Award)
- 2021 Deutscher Comedypreis for lifetime achievement

== Personal life ==
Kroymann is lesbian. In an interview with the German Taz, Kroymann has said that she always wanted people to know that she was a lesbian, but also that she can still play any role that she would be able to play if people didn't know that she was gay, and that it took some time before producers finally accepted the fact that an out lesbian can play straight characters.

== Filmography (selection) ==
- 1986: Wanderungen durch die Mark Brandenburg (Hikes through the March of Brandenburg, based on the travelogue by Theodor Fontane) IMDb
- 1988: Oh Gott, Herr Pfarrer (Oh God, Reverend)
- 1990: Baldur Blauzahn (Baldur Bluetooth)
- 1992: Vera Wesskamp
- 1992: Night on Fire
- 1992: Kein Pardon (No Pardon)
- 1993–1997: Nachtschwester Kroymann (Night Nurse Kroymann, comedy show)
- 1996: The Superwife
- 1998: Gisbert
- 1998: Der Campus (The Campus)
- 1999: Schande (Shame)
- 2000: Tatort: Bienzle und das Doppelspiel (Bienzle and the Double Game)
- 2001–2007: Mein Leben & Ich (My Life and I)
- 2001: Durch dick und dünn (Through Thick and Thin)
- 2003: Der Preis der Wahrheit (The Price of the Truth)
- 2004: Ein Baby zum Verlieben (A Baby to Fall in Love)
- 2004: Tatort: Bienzle und der steinerne Gast (Bienzle and the Guest of Stone)
- 2006: Nicht ohne meine Schwiegereltern (Not without my Inlaws)
- 2006: Hounded (a.k.a. Punish Me)
- 2007: Pastewka (TV series, guest)
- 2008: The Stranger in Me
- 2008: The Wave
- 2009: Wedding Fever in Campobello
- 2009: Horst Schlämmer – Isch kandidiere!
- 2010: The Hairdresser
- 2013: Free Fall
- 2014: Zu mir oder zu dir?
- 2016: Too Hard to Handle
- 2017–2021: Kroymann (comedy show)
- 2018: All About Me
- 2020: How to Sell Drugs Online (Fast)
- 2021: Mutter kündigt (Mother resigns)
- 2021: Mona & Marie
