= Die Oliver Pocher Show =

- Genre: Late-night entertainment
- Created by: Oliver Pocher
- Presented by: Oliver Pocher
- Country of origin: Germany
- Original language: German

Production
- Producers: Pocher Entertainment GmbH; Spiegel TV

Original release
- Network: Sat.1
- Release: 2 October 2009 – 18 March 2011

Die Oliver Pocher Show was a late-night show with Oliver Pocher shown by Sat.1 in Germany on Fridays. The show is a mix of late-night comedy and personality. Each broadcast begins with stand-up comedy. There are generally two celebrity guests. During the first season, Pocher's father Gerard frequently appeared on the show as a sidekick.

It is recorded early on Friday evenings in the old Residenz Theater in Köln. For special occasions there are also live shows.

The first season began in October 2009 and ended in April 2010. The second season will begin on 27 August 2010.

Pocher and Johannes B. Kerner where both contracted by SAT.1 as white hopes to put an end to severe losses of quotas after several years. Instead both of them attract disappointingly few viewers - long contract periods protect them from cancellations. However, there have been significant changes on the concept of the show: the typical late night desk was replaced by a couch, the band by a female DJ, Pocher's father by two nasty baby puppets who acted as sidekicks for several months. The show is still undercutting the low quotas and shares of cheap comedy reruns which currently fill most earlier time slots on SAT.1's Friday evening. The so-called Fun Freitag is famous for his series of spectacular failures - Pocher's former show partner and German late night legend Harald Schmidt warned him about that in several interviews. Schmidt himself continued his show, the Harald Schmidt Show in autumn 2011. The last episode of Oliver Pocher Show aired in March 2011.
