= Tommy Jaud =

German author and scriptwriter (born 1970)

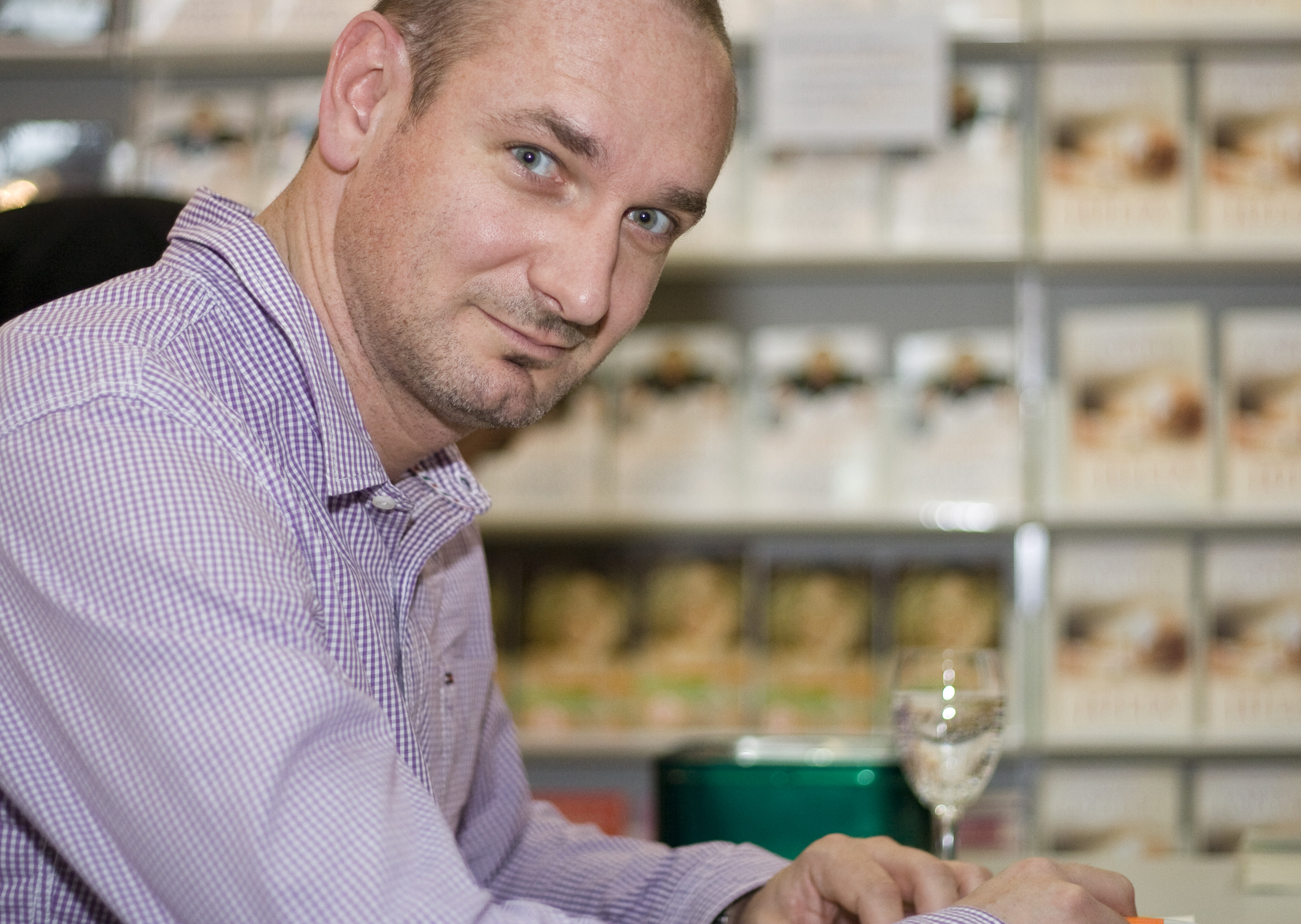
Tommy Jaud at the Leipzig Book Fair, 2010

Tommy Jaud (born 16 July 1970, in Schweinfurt) is a German author, scriptwriter, and freelance author for many television productions.

== Life ==
After completing his Abitur, Jaud served his compulsory civil service in a kindergarten. He went on to study German Studies at the University of Bamberg. During his time as a student, Jaud presented a radio show for Antenne Thüringen and worked on a freelance basis for the Harald Schmidt Show, a German television programme. He later abandoned his studies and headed for Cologne where he worked on various television productions. He was creative producer of the comedy series Ladykracher and head writer for Sat.1's Die Wochenshow. He also wrote for the Liebesleben series.

Jaud's published works, in German Vollidiot, Resturlaub and Millionär, have been recorded as audio books by Christoph Maria Herbst, and Vollidiot has been made into a film with comedian Oliver Pocher playing the main role of Simon Peters. The film also features Ellenie Salvo González, Oliver Fleischer and Anke Engelke, and was directed by Tobi Baumann, whilst the script was written by Jaud himself. He already had experience of working with Engelke and Baumann after they teamed up to write Ladykracher a few years previously.

The author describes his works as "readable television". He came up with this idea as, prior to being an author, he had worked on television scripts.

The German magazine Der Spiegel has championed Jaud's books as the rebirth of a stagnant genre, namely that of the German men's novel.
