= Ralf Husmann =

German television producer

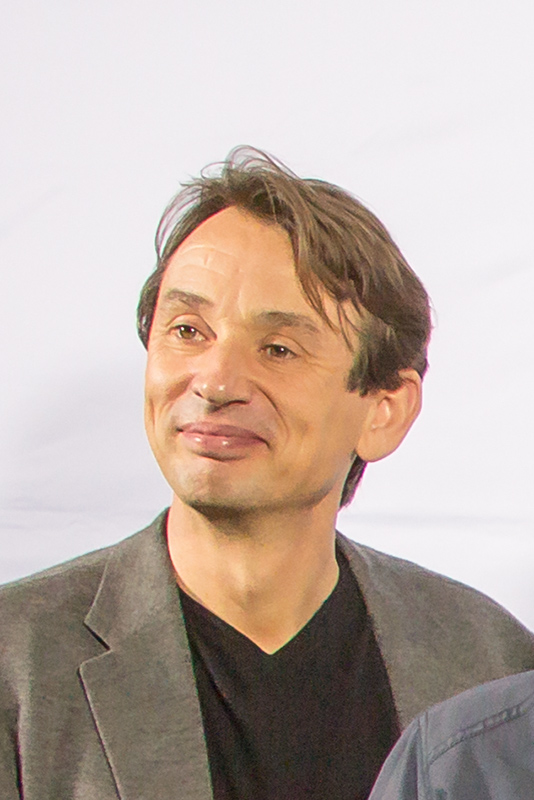
- Husmann in 2015
- Born: 24 September 1964 (age 62); Dortmund, West Germany (now Germany)
- Occupations: TV producer, Screenplay writer and author
- Years active: 1995 – present

Ralf Husmann (born 24 September 1964 in Dortmund) is a German TV producer, screenwriter and author. He is the creator of Stromberg, the German adaption of The Office.

== Life and work ==
In the 1980s Ralf Husmann had a cabaret-Duo named Burghardt & Husmann with his partner Hubert Burghardt. Since 1995 he is an employee of the German television production company Brainpool, where he is a headwriter and television producer. He is responsible for diverse comedy- and show-productions. Amongst other things Ralf Husmann wrote for Die Harald Schmidt Show, the comedy series Anke, the television series Berlin, Berlin and the television show Rent a Pocher. Furthermore he works as author for the comedy show RTL Samstag Nacht or the television magazine stern TV. He also created the television series Dr. Psycho – Die Bösen, die Bullen, meine Frau und ich and had the main responsibility for it.

Since 2004 Ralf Husmanns public profile rose rapidly because of his work as author for the author comedy series Stromberg. He also appeared as associate Hans Schmelzer in a few episodes. In 2007 he became assistant director of Brainpool.

Furthermore Ralf Husman wrote two books. In June 2009 he released his novel Nicht mein Tag, which became a bestseller in Germany. In September 2010 appeared his second novel Vorsicht vor Leuten, also in Germany.

== Filmography (selection) ==
- 1996: Die Harald Schmidt Show (writer, producer)
- 2000: Anke (writer, producer)
- 2003: Berlin, Berlin (one episode, writer)
- 2004–2012: Stromberg (writer, producer, actor)
- 2007–2008: Dr. Psycho – Die Bösen, die Bullen, meine Frau und ich (writer, producer, actor)
- 2009: Der kleine Mann (writer, producer)

== Awards and nominations ==
- Anke (2000)
  - 2001: German Comedy Awards – Nomination for Best Comedy Series
- Rent a Pocher (2003)
  - 2004: German Television Awards – Nomination for Best Comedy Program
  - 2005: German Comedy Awards – Winner of the German Comedy Award for Best Comedy Program
- Stromberg (2004–2010)
  - 2005: German Television Awards – Nomination for Best Sitcom
  - 2006: German Television Awards – Nomination for Best Sitcom
  - 2006: Adolf Grimme Awards – Winner of the Adolf Grimme Award for Fiction/Entertainment – Series/Miniseries
  - 2007: German Television Awards – Winner of the German Television Award for Best Sitcom
  - 2007: German Television Awards – Winner of the German Television Award for Best Screenplay
- Dr. Psycho – Die Bösen, die Bullen, meine Frau und ich (2007–2008)
  - 2007: Adolf Grimme Awards – Winner of the Adolf Grimme Award for Entertainment
  - 2007: German Television Awards – Winner of the German Television Award for Best Writing
