= Heavy Metal Payback =

Studio album by Bushido
- Released: 10 October 2008
- Recorded: 2008
- Genres: Rap, hip hop
- Label: ersguterjunge
- Producers: Bushido (exec.); Martin Stock; Beatlefield; Bizzy Montana; GEE Futuristic; X-plosive Beats; Screwaholic; Anno Domini Beats; O.C. Beats; Max Mostley; Microphono

Bushido chronology
7 (2007)	Heavy Metal Payback (2008)	Carlo Cokxxx Nutten 2 (2009)

Singles from Heavy Metal Payback
- 1. "Ching Ching" Released: 17 August 2008; 2. "Für immer jung" Released: 28 November 2008; 3. "Kennst du die Stars" Released: 30 April 2009

Heavy Metal Payback is the sixth solo album by German rapper Bushido, released 10 October 2008 under the record label ersguterjunge. The title of the album was taken from an earlier song titled "Heavy Metal Payback" from Aggro Ansage Nr. 2. Three singles were released: "Ching Ching", "Für immer jung" (feat. Karel Gott), and "Kennst du die Stars" (feat. Oliver Pocher). The album sold over 100,000 copies and received gold status in Germany.

== Production ==
The album was co-produced by Bushido. Most of the songs were produced by Martin Stock and Beatlefield (DJ Stickle & Chakuza).

Bushido organized an orchestra and a choir to record them. The orchestra was recorded in the great hall of slowakish radio and the recordings were mixed by DJ Stickle in the studio. Martin Stock conducted the orchestra.

== Track listing ==
No.	Title	Producer(s)	Length
1.	"Gangsta"	Bushido & Martin Stock	04:08
2.	"Hunde, die bellen, beißen nicht" (Dogs that bark, don't bite)	Gee Futuristic & X-plosive	04:03
3.	"Paragraph 117"	Beatlefield	04:03
4.	"Die Träne fällt" (The tear falls down) (featuring Nyze)	Bizzy Montana	03:45
5.	"Flug LH3516" (Flight LH3516)	Bushido & Martin Stock	04:13
6.	"Merk dir eins" (Remember one thing)	Max Mostley	03:44
7.	"4, 3, 2, 1 (Vielen Dank Aggro Berlin)" (Thanks a lot Aggro Berlin)	Beatlefield	03:50
8.	"Ching Ching"	Beatlefield	04:18
9.	"Heavy Metal" (featuring Kay One)	Screwaholic, Anno Domini Beats	03:27
10.	"Ich hoffe es geht dir gut" (I hope you're well) (featuring Bizzy Montana)	Bushido & Martin Stock	04:04
11.	"Bonnie und Clyde" (Bonnie and Clyde) (featuring Cassandra Steen)	Gee Futuristic	04:17
12.	"Jenny"	Bushido & Martin Stock	03:45
13.	"Hai Life" (Shark life)	Bushido & Martin Stock	03:54
14.	"Es kommt wie es kommt" (What will be, will be)	Gee Futuristic & X-plosive	03:26
15.	"Für immer jung" (Forever young) (featuring Karel Gott)	Bizzy Montana	04:30
16.	"Rolling Stone"	O.C. Beats & Saad Tee	04:30
17.	"Boomerang"	Gee Futuristic & X-plosive	03:55
18.	"Mann im Spiegel" (Man in the mirror)	Bushido, Martin Stock & Max Mostley	04:45
19.	"Outro"	Microphono	01:48

Limited edition
No.	Title	Producer(s)	Length
1.	"Apres Ski"	Gee Futuristic & Yeebrass	3:42
2.	"So Ghetto"	Daniel Ward Melendez	4:16
3.	"Kennst du die Stars" (Do you know the stars) (featuring Oliver Pocher)	Beatlefield	3:09
4.	"Hass" (Hate) (featuring Chakuza)	Beatlefield	4:05

Limited deluxe box
No.	Title	Producer(s)	Length
1.	"Es gibt kein wir" (There is no us)	Bizzy Montana	4:45
2.	"Es klickt" (It's clicking)	Bizzy Montana	3:38
3.	"Und sie dachten" (And they thought)	Auditory & Elroach Muzik	3:45
4.	"Autorität" (Authority) (featuring Summer Cem)	Max Mostley	4:15

DVD (premium edition & limited deluxe box)
No.	Title	Length
1.	"Documentary"
2.	"Photo shoot Heavy Metal Payback"
3.	"Making of Ching Ching"
4.	"Extras"

Samples

- "Es gibt kein wir" contains a sample of "Oxygene Part 2" performed by Jean-Michel Jarre.

== Charts ==
=== Weekly charts ===
Chart (2008)	Peak position
Austrian Albums (Ö3 Austria)	2
German Albums (Offizielle Top 100)	1
Swiss Albums (Schweizer Hitparade)	2

=== Year-end charts ===
Chart (2008)	Position
Austrian Albums (Ö3 Austria)	69
German Albums (Offizielle Top 100)	56

== Certifications ==
Region	Certification	Certified units/sales
Austria (IFPI Austria)	Gold	10,000^{*}
Germany (BVMI)	Gold	100,000^{^}
^{*} Sales figures based on certification alone.^{^} Shipments figures based on certification alone.
