= Dr. Psycho – Die Bösen, die Bullen, meine Frau und ich =

German crime-comedy television series

- Created by: Ralf Husmann
- Starring: Christian Ulmen; Anneke Kim Sarnau; Hinnerk Schönemann; Roeland Wiesnekker; Ulrich Gebauer; Annika Kuhl
- Country of origin: Germany
- No. of seasons: 2
- No. of episodes: 14

Production
- Executive producers: Cheryl Tayor; Mark Freeland
- Producer: Brainpool
- Running time: 45 mins

Original release
- Network: ProSieben
- Release: 26 March 2007 – 12 August 2008

Dr. Psycho – Die Bösen, die Bullen, meine Frau und ich (Dr Psycho - The Bad, The Coppers, My Wife and I) is a German crime comedy television series. It was broadcast from 26 March 2007 to 12 August 2008 by the German private channel ProSieben in two seasons.

== Plot ==
The series deals with the work of a special unit for organized crime and especially with the work of the police psychologist Dr Max Munzl. He is the new guy in the department and is generally disliked at first because his colleagues don't think they need a psychologist, but rather more police colleagues.

== Characters ==
=== Dr. Max Munzl ===
Dr. Max Munzl is the protagonist of the series. He is trained as a police psychologist and has been moved to the department for organized crime. Arriving there, he starts immediately to analyze his colleagues and to help them with their problems. On the other hand, however, he can hardly manage his own life. His wife Lena wants to divorce him because he is clumsy, confused and oblivious. Despite the steadfast belief to save the marriage, they finally get divorced.

=== Kerstin Winter ===
Kerstin Winter is the only woman of the department. By her increased male behaviour, however, she tries to fit into her male group of colleagues. That's why she acts as a tight policewoman without mercy within the department. Nevertheless, Max Munzl discovers very fast that she is really much more sensitive and that she owns a teddy bear, for example.

=== Eddie Stachowiak ===
Eddie Stachowiak is the youngest colleague of the department. His colleagues don't concede much intelligence to him and he likes to work more with his hands than with his brain. At the end of the first season he gets engaged.

=== Victor Kellinghoff ===
Victor Kellinghoff is a colleague of Max Munzl. He apparently has a drinking issue about which Max is the first to speak openly about.

== Trivia ==
- Dr Max Munzl owns a dog called Freud.
- The first three episodes were directed by Ralf Huettner, episodes four to six by Richard Huber.

== Response ==
Dr Psycho is nominated for the coveted international television award Rose d'Or and Christian Ulmen is nominated as best main actor for the Bavarian television award in 2007. The public critics rated the first episodes predominantly positive:

- Quotenmeter.de wrote on 23 March 2007 about the series: "«Dr Psycho» is an utmost well-done and hilarious crime comedy that stands out very positively from the presently produced and aired comedy pabulum of Germany."
- FAZ praised on 24 March 2007: "Christian Ulmen is a brilliant improvisational comedian. In the new crime series „Dr Psycho“ [...] he proves as a police psychologist how funny he is by realizing completely written screenplays."
- Frankfurter Allgemeine Sonntagszeitung praised in the succeeding 25 March 2007 issue equally, especially Ulmen's acting skills.
- Christian Boß wrote for Spiegel Online on 25 March 2007 (in contrast to the praise in the print issue of Spiegel): "No comedy, no crime, no style: The actually exceptionally gifted non-actor Christian Ulmen stumbles from tomorrow on with (...) psychological truisms through a new Pro-Sieben series. [...] But in Dr Psycho neither slapstick nor action works."
- Die Welt wrote after the broadcast of the first episode a consistently positive review. According to it, there were "again and again moments with smoothed verdicts. They were mostly by the main character, perfectly cast with Christian Ulmen."
- taz wrote on 26 March 2007 about Ulmen: "That's someone who dares something." taz also wrote, he improved his acting skills in the course of the series visibly.
- Süddeutsche Zeitung called Munzl "a young Columbo: sappy, racked, shuffled" in its 26 March 2007 issue. According to reviewer Senta Krasser the cast, the text, the direction and even the lead-in fits.
- Der Spiegel wrote in its printed issue 14 of 2 April 2007 on page 106: ""Actor Christian Ulmen is a godsend of the entertainers' heaven." "Dr Psycho" be "big anarchical fun."
- Medienhandbuch.de, a portal for media, IT, communication and culture describes the first episode as "a mix of bizarre intelligent to ribald humour with a proper share of action that has not existed like this in the federal German television environment until now." Script, casting and actors are praised "great".
- On popkulturjunkie.de the plot of the series is described as "not thrilling, not funny, just tough and mediocre". "Dr. Psycho" be "a kind of “Monk” for the poor".

== Episodes ==
=== Season 1 ===
Episode	Original title	Title translation	First air date
1	Osama	Osama	26 March 2007
2	Blow Job Betty	Blow Job Betty	2 April 2007
3	Die einzige Zeugin	The Only Witness	16 April 2007
4	Der Türke	The Turk	23 April 2007
5	Schlimme Kunst	Bad Art	30 April 2007
6	Der polnische Maulwurf	The Polish Snitch	7 May 2007

=== Season 2 ===
Episode	Original title	Title translation	First air date
1	Selbsthilfe	Self Help	24 June 2008
2	Kuchenfolter	Cake Torture	1 July 2008
3	Blumen, Gedichte und Arschlöcher	Flowers, Poems and Assholes	8 July 2008
4	Gammelfleisch	Spoiled Meat	15 July 2008
5	Der letzte Wille	The Last Will	22 July 2008
6	Tiefschlag	Low Blow	29 July 2008
7	Soko WG	Task Force Flatshare	5 August 2008
8	Der doppelte Psycho	The Double Psycho	12 August 2008
