= Harald Schmidt (TV series) =

- Created by: Harald Schmidt
- Presented by: Harald Schmidt
- Starring: Harald Schmidt, Manuel Andrack, Katrin Bauerfeind, Oliver Pocher, Ralf Kabelka
- Composer: Helmut Zerlett
- Country of origin: Germany

Production
- Production location: Cologne
- Running time: 44 minutes

Original release
- Network: ARD
- Release: 2004 – 2007

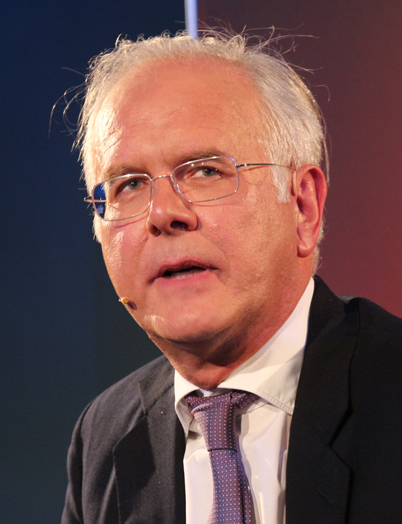
Harald Schmidt, the host of the show

Harald Schmidt is a late night television show which was broadcast on ARD and hosted by Harald Schmidt from 23 December 2004 until 14 June 2007. It returned at 17 September 2009 after the show Schmidt & Pocher with Harald Schmidt and Oliver Pocher ended earlier that year.

Harald Schmidt followed Die Harald Schmidt Show (The Harald Schmidt Show) on the German TV channel Sat.1. The latter ended on 23 December 2003 after Schmidt, at short notice, did not renew his contract. ARD immediately showed interest in getting Schmidt back onto ARD, where he had originally begun his career. According to the German newspaper Der Tagesspiegel, Schmidt was in contact with NDR director Jobst Plog after he had backed out of Sat.1. Nevertheless, they did not start seriously negotiating the contract until the Harald Schmidt Show follow-up Anke Late Night, broadcast by Sat.1, was dropped. Jobst Plog said that initially the contract with Harald Schmidt (at a cost of €9.7 million per year) would run until July 2006. There are about €150,000 available for each show. Sources in the TV industry estimate the production costs alone to be about €30,000 per show. ARD announced that they planned to finance Harald Schmidt by cutting the amount that they spent on television rights for football matches. By no longer broadcasting UEFA Cup matches, ARD would have the money which it needs to finance Harald Schmidt.

== Run of the program ==
The pilot episode aired in December 2004, broadcast exactly one year after Sat.1 televised the last episode of The Harald Schmidt Show. On 19 January 2005, the first regular show followed. The program was initially aired around 11 pm on Wednesdays and Thursdays by Das Erste, one of Germany's public broadcast stations. One Thursday a month the show did not run, replaced with the cabaret program Scheibenwischer. Early in 2007 the broadcasting time changed to 10:45 pm. The show was repeated by all regional broadcast stations of Das Erste the same night or during the following weekend.

The last episode (a 45-minute "best of") aired on 14 June 2007. After the summer break, Harald Schmidt was replaced by the new program Schmidt & Pocher, which first aired 25 October 2007. The new program is only broadcast once a week on Thursdays; with a length of 60 minutes, however, it is twice as long as the previous show. The Wednesday night time slot was given to Frank Plasberg and his talk show Hart aber fair.

Harald Schmidt and Oliver Pocher presented Schmidt & Pocher together. The choice of Pocher as co-moderator was criticized especially in some feuilletons. According to Spiegel, a German newsmagazine, Schmidt ruled out the possibility of a comeback of The Harald Schmidt Show or Harald Schmidt shortly after the last episode of Harald Schmidt was broadcast since he was generally no longer interested in late night shows.

== The concept ==
An episode of Harald Schmidt lasted 30 minutes. The show was either recorded at 7 pm the day of the show in front of an audience or broadcast live. From the start of the show until the end of 2005, the show was broadcast in Studio 449 in Cologne-Mülheim. Since January 2006 the show was moved to a bigger studio, where The Harald Schmidt Show was also produced.

After a one-year break, Schmidt started his new late night show on 23 December 2004. He presented a concept that was slightly different from the former Harald Schmidt Show. Particularly noticeable was that at first guests were not invited to the show anymore although Schmidt had explained to German entertainer Günter Jauch in a media discussion in 2002 that his show would not be possible without guests. Furthermore, it also stands in contrast to the public opinion saying that the guest part usually was the more interesting one. At first the usual stand-up comedy part was also missing, but then it was re-introduced after a few episodes.

After all those changes the concept corresponded again to the one of its Sat.1 predecessor, only with less outdoor activities and little films. As in the former Harald Schmidt Show, Manuel Andrack was Schmidt's sidekick, and the accompanying show band consisted of nearly all musicians of the former show band with the only exception of former band leader Helmut Zerlett. Several months after the start of the show, Nathalie Licard, also known from The Harald Schmidt Show, was again taken into the ensemble. At first she appeared sporadically, but eventually she was an integral part of the ARD show band. There she was the "non-singing singer". Twice she ever performed songs on stage; "Happy Birthday" à la Marilyn Monroe wearing a blonde wig and the German folk song "Im Salzkammergut".

A few months after the show was launched, Schmidt introduced a new structural element, an artificial "commercial break". Such an interruption was actually not necessary because ARD, a public broadcasting company, is not allowed to broadcast commercials after 8 pm.

Nevertheless, Schmidt announced once in every show: "We'll have a short commercial break." Then, the band in the studio started playing a song, just as they used to do during the advert breaks of The Harald Schmidt Show on Sat.1. But instead of changing to commercials the band was shown playing a song, which usually came along with a satiric dedication. The introduction of this artificial "commercial break" was a reaction to criticism from different directions claiming that the show was rather lengthy without interruption.

The focus of the show was changed to ongoing events and media criticism. Whereas, before, Harald Schmidt had often been compared to David Letterman, critics are now drawing comparisons to Jon Stewart whose The Daily Show deals with the latest events and the media in the United States. Reacting to criticism on the lengthiness of his program, Harald Schmidt thus joked about his new show: "Harald Schmidt is an knock-off of the intelligent American satirical Daily Show by Jon Stewart — without coming close to it."

Starting in September 2005, Schmidt featured guests in every show again (with few exceptions). This change was not announced. When Caroline Korneli, moderator of Fritz radio station, was a guest on the show, she asked about the change of concept. Schmidt answered that he realized that there were in fact still persons, who, in his opinion, are worth being invited.
