= Kennst du die Stars =

Single by Bushido featuring Oliver Pocher

from the album Heavy Metal Payback
- Released: 2009
- Genre: hip hop
- Label: ersguterjunge
- Songwriters: Bushido, Andreas Janetschko, Peter Pangerl

Bushido featuring Oliver Pocher singles chronology
| "Für immer jung" (2008) | "Kennst du die Stars" (2009) | "Eine Chance/Zu Gangsta" (2009) |

"Kennst du die Stars" (German: "Do you know the Stars") is the third single by German rapper Bushido featuring comedian Oliver Pocher, from his album, Heavy Metal Payback. The song based on a hip-hop beat and a horns loop.

== Lyrical context ==
Bushido and Oliver Pocher poking fun at German celebrities, including Sarah Connor, Mario Barth, Sido and Detlef "D" Soost. Pocher jokes at singer Mark Medlock by saying that his "ass were full of whipped cream" and additional he compares him with Sarah Connor, describing her as "embarrassing". He also targeted Lady Bitch Ray, Mario Barth, Sido, Detlef Soost and pop group Room 2012.

Pocher parodies Lil Wayne, using the auto-tune.

== Music video ==
Watch here: http://www.myspace.com/video/vid/55436186

== Sources ==
- http://rapresent.me/bushido-feat-olli-pocher-kennst-du-die-stars-video/
