= Die Harald Schmidt Show =

Late night talk show from Germany

- Genre: Variety/Talk
- Presented by: Harald Schmidt
- Composer: Helmut Zerlett
- Country of origin: Germany
- Original language: German
- No. of episodes: 1700+ in 17 seasons

Production
- Production location: Studio 449, Cologne
- Running time: 43 min.
- Production companies: Kogel & Schmidt GmbH

Original release
- Network: Sat.1
- Release: 5 December 1995 - 23 December 2003; 13 September 2011 - 13 March 2014

Die Harald Schmidt Show ("The Harald Schmidt Show") was a German late-night talk show hosted on Sky Deutschland by comedian Harald Schmidt. The show first aired from 5 December 1995 to 23 December 2003 on Sat.1. Schmidt then moved his show to Das Erste as Harald Schmidt and Schmidt & Pocher, but he returned to Sat.1 on 13 September 2011. After its cancellation on Sat.1, the show continued on Sky Deutschland in September 2012, before Schmidt retired from television in 2014.

== Writers ==
- Peter Rütten
- Manuel Andrack
- Suzana Novinščak
- Nathalie Licard
- Ralf Kabelka
- Katrin Bauerfeind

== Music ==
- Helmut Zerlett – keyboard, bandleader
- Axel Heilhecker - guitar
- Rosko Gee - bass
- Antoine Fillon - drums
- Jürgen Dahmen - keyboard
- Thomas Heberer - trumpets
- Mel Collins - saxophone

== History ==
The first incarnation of the show aired from 5 December 1995 in the Tuesday-Saturday 11:15 pm time slot. The shows from Tuesday to Friday were live on tape, and the Saturday shows were live. Over time, the Saturday shows were phased out. From 30 June 2003 until the end of its first run on 23 December 2003, it also aired Monday shows.

Schmidt then moved to Das Erste with his band leader Helmut Zerlett, but without his sidekick Manuel Andrack. Schmidt moved back to Sat.1 beginning from 13 September 2011, hosting two shows a week every Tuesday and Wednesday at 11:15 pm. Sat.1 canceled the show after one season due to low viewer levels. Since 4 September 2012 new episodes are shown on Sky Hits HD and Sky Atlantic HD, two channels of the German Pay-TV network Sky Deutschland.

The format of the show is similar to American late night talk shows, with a monologue in the beginning, followed by comedy skits, interviews, and a musical guest.

== Polish joke controversy ==
Schmidt was criticized for multiple usage of Polish jokes in his show. In his interview, Schmidt stated that he was surprised with the reaction. He mentioned that nobody makes much fuss about jokes involving Japanese or Germans. However, when he became aware of the reception, he stopped using these kinds of jokes.

== Awards ==
Year	Award	Category
1997	Adolf Grimme Award	Fiction/Entertainment
1997	Bambi	TV Hosting
1997	RTL Golden Lion Award	Best Hosting for a TV Show
1999	Bayerischer Fernsehpreis	Hosting
2000	Deutscher Fernsehpreis	Best Host in a Comedy Program
2001	Deutscher Fernsehpreis	Best Host in an Entertainment Program
2002	Goldene Kamera	Entertainment
2002	Adolf Grimme Award	Outstanding Individual Achievement
2003	Deutscher Fernsehpreis	Best Comedy Program

== List of episodes in 2011 (abridgement) ==
#	Original airdate	Guest(s)
1	Tuesday 13 September 2011	Hape Kerkeling, Guano Apes
2	Wednesday 14 September 2011	Anne-Sophie Mutter
3	Tuesday 20 September 2011	Joko Winterscheidt, Klaas Heufer-Umlauf, Aloe Blacc
4	Wednesday 21 September 2011	Jürgen von der Lippe, Selah Sue
5	Tuesday 27 September 2011	Josef Bierbichler, Caro Emerald
6	Wednesday 28 September 2011	Herbert Grönemeyer, Jools Holland
7	Tuesday 4 October 2011	Samy Deluxe
8	Wednesday 5 October 2011	Werner Herzog, James Morrison
9	Tuesday 11 October 2011	Melanie Mühl, Lady Antebellum
10	Wednesday 12 October 2011	Julie Engelbrecht, Rea Garvey
11	Tuesday 18 October 2011	Leander Haußmann, Seasick Steve
12	Wednesday 19 October 2011	Wolke Hegenbarth, Alison Moyet
13	Tuesday 25 October 2011	Michael Mittermeier, Jonathan Jeremiah
14	Wednesday 26 October 2011	Otto Waalkes, Milow
15	Wednesday 2 November 2011	Roland Emmerich, Kasabian
16	Tuesday 8 November 2011	Götz Alsmann
17	Wednesday 9 November 2011	David Garrett
18	Tuesday 15 November 2011	Felix Sturm, Black Stone Cherry
19	Wednesday 16 November 2011	Til Schweiger, Kenny Wayne Shepherd
20	Tuesday 22 November 2011	Lemmy, Motörhead
21	Wednesday 23 November 2011	Angelika Kallwass, Jupiter Jones
