= Prashant Prabhakar =

German actor of Indian origin (born 1974)

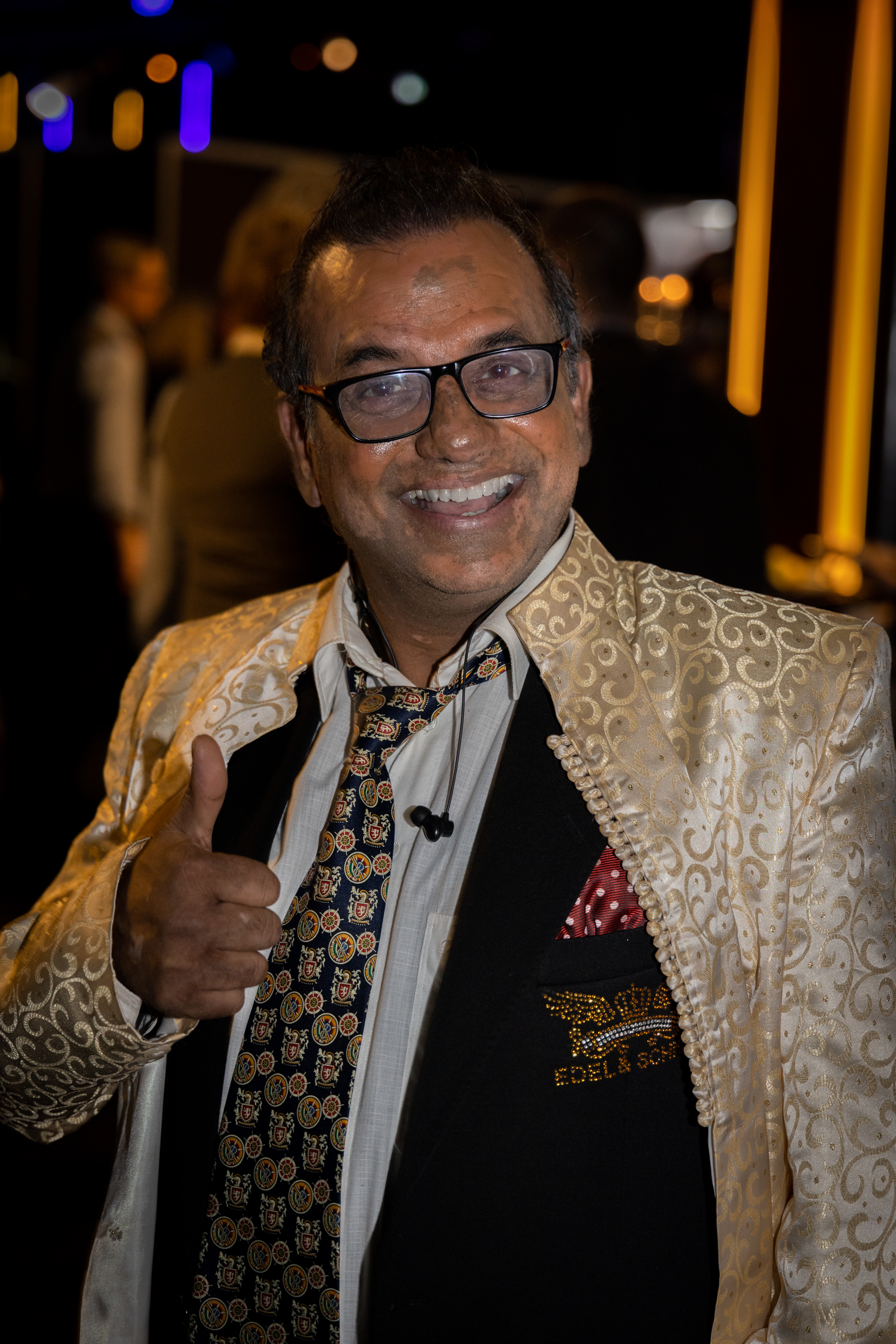
- Born: 13 October 1974 (age 51); Madhubani district, Bihar, India
- Occupation: Actor
- Years active: 2005–present

Prashant Prabhakar Jaiswal (born 13 October 1974) is a German actor of Indian origin. He has acted in several films, short films and television series.

== Early life and education ==
Prashant Prabhakar Jaiswal was born in the Madhubani district of Bihar on 13 October 1974. In 2002, Prashant Prabhakar emigrated to Germany. In Göttingen, Lower Saxony he began to study social sciences.

== Career ==
Since 1994, Prashant Prabhakar has participated in several German commercials, films, television movies and series. Thanks to his role as Co-worker Prashant in the television series Stromberg, he became known to a wider audience in Germany, in which he participated since the second season.

== Filmography (selection) ==
- 2005: Crime Scene (Tatort) (TV series)
- 2006: Aktenzeichen XY… ungelöst (TV series)
- 2008: Angie (TV series)
- 2009: Die Pfefferkörner (TV series)
- 2009: Cologne P.D. (TV series)
- 2009: Last Stop Toyland (Spielzeugland Endstation)
- 2009: Desert Flower
- 2010: Mia and the Millionaire (TV movie)
- 2010: Mit Herz und Handschellen (TV series)
- 2010: Liebling, lass uns scheiden! (TV movie)
- 2010: Toxic Lullaby
- 2010: Fasten à la Carte (TV movie)
- 2011: Lisas Fluch (TV movie)
- 2011: Men in the City 2
- 2011: Nightmare Fever (Alptraumfieber)
- 2011: Aazaan
- 2012: Stromberg (TV series, appearance in 29 episodes from 2005 to 2012)
- 2012: Crime Scene (Tatort), (TV series)
- 2012: Robin Hood: Ghosts of Sherwood
- 2012: Agent Ranjid rettet die Welt
