= Diana Staehly =

German actress (born 1977)

- Born: 31 October 1977 (age 47); Cologne, Germany
- Occupation: Actress
- Spouse: René Wolter (m. 2007)
- Children: 1

Diana Staehly (born 31 October 1977) is a German actress.

== Education ==
Staehly's training began in 1997, when she first took private acting lessons. In 2000 she was trained at the Hollywood Acting Workshop in Cologne. She moved to New York City in 2001 and studied at the Lee Strasberg Theatre and Film Institute. From 2002 to 2006, she studied media and cultural studies.

== Career ==
Through her hobby, Staehly came to work-routed RTL soap opera Unter uns, when the casting agency for the series was looking for a talented actress. From 1997 to 2000, she played the role of Susanne "Sue" Sommerfeld in the series. In 2002, she took on a role in the series Alarm für Cobra 11 – Die Autobahnpolizei. From 2001 to 2006, she had a role in the series Die Anrheiner. From 2004 to 2012, she appeared in the comedy series Stromberg as Tanja Steinke (née Seifert) and in 2014 in the film Stromberg – The Movie. From 2007 to 2015, she played in the ZDF series Die Rosenheim-Cops with the role of financial controller Patrizia Ortmann. In January 2012, she played in the ZDF series Die Bergretter in the episode "Gold Rush" the highly pregnant Sophie Zeidler. From September 2016, Staehly was seen as the new main commissioner Anna Maiwald in the ZDF series Cologne P.D., succeeding Christina Plate. The shooting of the consequences of the 13th season began in January 2016 in Cologne. In addition, from 2017 on, she plays the lead actress Anna in Triple Ex.

Staehly made her film debut in the German comedy Special Escort (2007) alongside of Florian Lukas and Sebastian Bezzel.

== Personal life ==
Since 2007, Staehly is married to the director René Wolter, with whom she has a daughter (b. 2012).

== Filmography ==
- 1997-2000: Unter uns (TV series, 23 episodes)
- 2000: Beauties
- 2001-2006: Die Anrheiner (TV series, 54 episodes)
- 2002-2014: Alarm für Cobra 11 - Die Autobahnpolizei (TV series, 3 episodes)
- 2003: Wilsberg (TV series)
- 2004: Verschollen
- 2004: König von Kreuzberg (TV series, 7 episodes)
- 2004-2012: Stromberg (TV series, 46 episodes)
- 2005: Cologne P.D.
- 2006: Forsthaus Falkenau - Entscheidung in der Savanne
- 2006: Inga Lindström - Sommertage am Lilja-See (TV film)
- 2006: Rosamunde Pilcher - Sommer der Liebe (TV film)
- 2007: Special Escort
- 2007: Unter anderen Umständen: Bis dass der Tod euch scheidet
- 2007-2016: Die Rosenheim-Cops (TV series, 247 Episodes)
- 2012: Die Bergretter - Goldrausch
- 2012: Der letzte Bulle - Aller guten Dinge sind drei
- 2012: Die Tote ohne Alibi (TV film)
- 2014: Stromberg - Der Film
- 2015: Hanna Hellmann (TV miniseries, 2 episodes)
- 2015: Mein gebrauchter Mann (TV film)
- 2016: Bettys Diagnose - Turteln und Zwitschern
- 2016: Stuttgart Homicide - Dirty Harry
- since 2016: Cologne P.D. (TV series, 25 episodes)
- 2017: Triple Ex (TV series)
