= Stromberg (TV series) =

German mockumentary comedy television series

- Genre: Mockumentary; Sitcom
- Created by: Ralf Husmann; Inspired by the UK BBC series‚ The Office created by Ricky Gervais & Stephen Merchant
- Written by: Ralf Husman (44 episodes); Moritz Netenjakob (3 episodes); Dietmar Jacobs (2 episodes); Tankred Lerch (2 episodes); Sonja Schönemann (2 episodes); Christian Martin (3 episodes); David von Felten (2 episodes); Aglef Püschel (1 episode); Matthias Schmitt (1 episode)
- Directed by: Arne Feldhusen (39 episodes); Franziska Meletzky (4 episodes); Andreas Theurer (3 episodes)
- Starring: Christoph Maria Herbst; Oliver Wnuk; Bjarne Mädel; Diana Staehly; Martina Eitner-Acheampong
- Country of origin: Germany
- Original language: German
- No. of seasons: 5
- No. of episodes: 46 (list of episodes)

Production
- Running time: 22–28 minutes
- Production company: Brainpool TV

Original release
- Network: ProSieben
- Release: 11 October 2004 – 31 January 2012

Stromberg (German pronunciation: [ˈʃtʁɔmbɛɐk]) is a German mockumentary comedy television series which is produced by Brainpool and broadcast on the commercial television channel ProSieben. The series stars Christoph Maria Herbst as Bernd Stromberg and is written mainly by Ralf Husmann. It has become one of the most popular comedy shows in German-speaking countries and was honored with many awards such as the Deutscher Fernsehpreis and Grimme-Preis. Its success also spawned other media such as a book and a two feature films.

Stromberg marks one of the first international adaptations of the British TV series The Office, preceding the American counterpart by a year while at the same time sparking a copyright dispute with the BBC. Furthermore, the German equivalent is a more loose adaptation than most other international versions of the show (e.g. it takes place at an insurance company).

== Synopsis ==
The show takes place at the office of the fictional insurance company "Capitol Versicherung AG", (Capitol Insurance PLC) where the trivial day-to-day events take place in an eerie atmosphere oscillating between bullying and sycophancy.

== Cast ==
- Christoph Maria Herbst as Bernd Stromberg
- Bjarne Mädel as Berthold "Ernie" Heisterkamp
- Oliver Wnuk as Ulf Steinke
- Diana Staehly as Tanja Steinke (* Seifert)
- Martina Eitner-Acheampong as Erika Burstedt
- Lars Gärtner as Timo Becker
- Tatjana Alexander as Tatjana Berkel
- Sinan Akkus as Sinan Turculu
- Maja Beckmann as Sabine "Sabbel" Buhrer
- Simon Licht as Hans-Jürgen Wehmeyer
- Peter Rütten as Mr. Pötsch
- Milena Dreißig as Jennifer Schirrmann
- Laurens Walter as Lars Lehnhoff
- Angelika Richter as Nicole Rückert
- Walter Gontermann as Dr. Heinemann
- Frank Montenbruck as Frank Montenbruck
- Joe Henselewski as Josef Müller
- Rita Winkelmann as Rita Klüver
- Prashant Prabhakar as Prashant Kumabandhu
- Stefan Lampadius as Steffen Lambert
- Nadja Becker as Maja Decker
- Dorothea Förtsch as Dorothea Förtsch
- Andreas Hermann as Andreas Hermann
- Suzanne Landsfried as Mrs. Landsfried
- Ralf Husmann as Hans Schmelzer
- Michaela Caspar as Frau Papenacker

== Broadcast ==
The first season, which appeared in 2004, was made up of eight episodes. A second season of ten episodes, although not initially planned, was launched on 11 September 2005. A third season of eight episodes was launched on 5 March 2007. A fourth season was launched on 3 November 2009, with the entire season being available on DVD on 6 November. In 2011, a fifth season of Stromberg was aired and concluded in January 2012.

In 2021 small TV spots were produced to support the German vaccination campaign against COVID-19, with Stromberg as sceptical towards the vaccination who has to be convinced.

== Copyright controversy ==
The series was proclaimed to be a copy of the BBC series The Office, although initially the producers claimed it was based on a character from a past ProSieben comedy, despite many elements resembling The Office. An "inspired by" credit was given to the creators of The Office, Ricky Gervais and Stephen Merchant, after the BBC threatened ProSieben with legal action.

== Book ==
In 2007, the success of the show spawned the mock Chef - Deutsch / Deutsch - Chef. Klartext am Arbeitsplatz ("Boss-German/German-Boss: Straight Talk at Work"). It was published under the advertising pseudonym of "Bernd Stromberg" by German dictionary publishing company Langenscheidt shortly before the third season. The book became a bestseller in Germany and topped the non-fiction charts of Der Spiegel.

== Feature films ==
In December 2011, €1 million was collected by crowd funding to help create a Stromberg feature film. Production started in early 2013 according to producer Ralf Husmann. Stromberg – Der Film ("Stromberg – The Movie") was released in cinemas in Germany on 20 February 2014. The film was the highest-grossing film in Germany in the first two weeks after its release.

A second movie by the same team, Stromberg - Wieder alles wie immer ("Stromberg - Same As Usual Again"), was co-financed by Amazon and is slated for theatrical release in December of 2025.
