= Alles verloren =

Single by Bushido

from the album 7
- Released: 17 August 2007
- Genre: German hip hop
- Label: ersguterjunge
- Songwriters: Bushido; Andreas Janetschko; Peter Pangerl

Bushido singles chronology
"Eure Kinder" (2007)	"Alles verloren" (2007)	"Reich mir nicht deine Hand" (2007)

"Alles verloren" (literally "Lost everything") is the first single by German rapper Bushido's album 7.

== Song information ==
With this track, Bushido fired back at his critical reviewers by declaring that he will never shut his mouth and he will continue with provocative songs until the reviewers stop their criticism.

== Track list ==
1. Alles verloren (album version) (4:29)
2. Alles verloren (video) (4:18)

== Charts ==
=== Weekly charts ===
Chart (2007)	Peak position
Austria (Ö3 Austria Top 40)	3
Germany (GfK)	4
Switzerland (Schweizer Hitparade)	22

=== Year-end charts ===
Chart (2007)	Position
Austria (Ö3 Austria Top 40)	47
Germany (Official German Charts)	60

== Certifications ==
Region	Certification	Certified units/sales
Germany (BVMI)	Gold	150,000^{‡}
^{‡} Sales+streaming figures based on certification alone.
