= Tatjana Alexander =

Australian-born German-Austrian actress

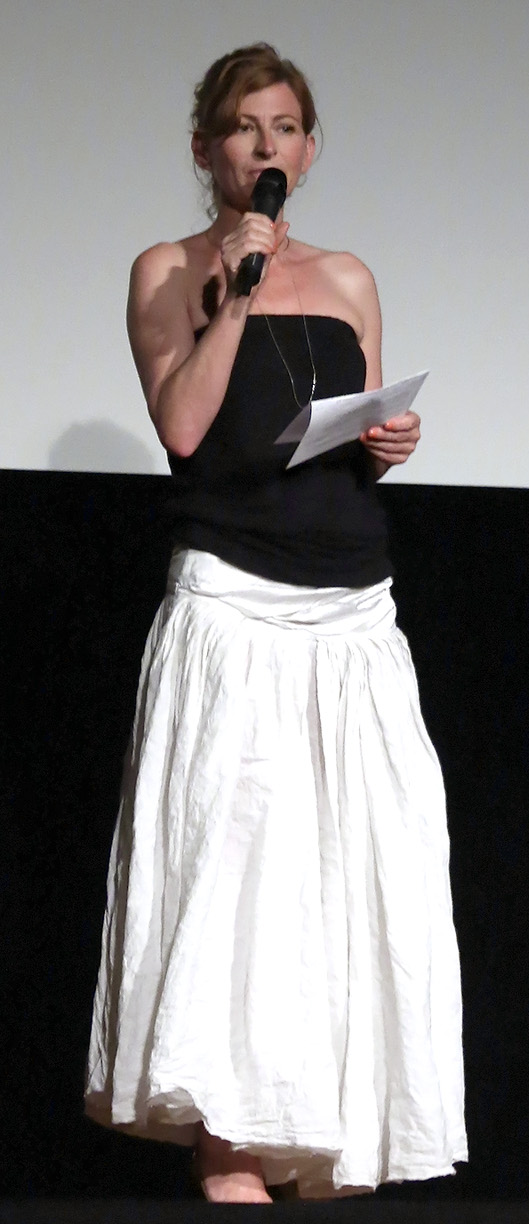
Alexander at Vienna Independent Shorts 2014

Tatjana Katharina Alexander (born 1969) is an Australian-born German-Austrian actress. She was born in 1969 in Melbourne, Australia. Her family relocated to Austria, where Alexander graduated from the Academy of Business and Economics in 1989.

After working as production assistant and directors assistant in the theatre in her home town she moved to Los Angeles to study acting at Milton Katsellas' BeverlyHillsPlayhouse. She moved to Sydney to study more at the National Institute of Dramatic Arts (NIDA).

While she stayed with her family in Europe she gave her European debut appearing on episodes of the Austrian television series Stockinger and Inspector Rex in 1996.

In 1998, Alexander moved to Berlin and appeared for the first time in a lead role in Stephan Wagners' debut film, Smoking Cuban Style. 1999 she worked with Lois Weinberger and Markus Heltschl on As Ever - Am Rande Der Arena - a documentary feature film full of allusions and cross-references to Weinberger's work as an artist. The film premiered at the Museum of the 20th Century in Vienna and was invited at many Filmfestivals, among them the International Filmfestival Rotterdam and the Berlin International Filmfestival. In 1999, she worked with Russian director Andrej Nekrassov on his film Ljubov I Drugi Koshmari - Love And Other Nightmares.

In 2000 she began her long collaboration with Filippos Tsitos in his debut film, My Sweet Home, part of the official selection of the Berlin International FilmfestivaI in 2001.

During the following years Alexander worked on three television crime movies in Germany - Tatort Wolf Im Schafpelz, Sechs Zum Essen und Unsterblich Schön - all directed by Tsitos.

In 2004 she became part of the regular cast on the German version of The Office called Stromberg, in which she portrayed Stromberg's manager, Tatjana Berkel. The TV series was nominated for Best German Comedy and received the award in 2005.

In the television drama Breaking Ice, by Falk Schweikhardt shot in 2005 on locations near the Czech border, Alexander portrayed a mother, whose two children break into a lake in winter, fighting for her children's lives while becoming more and more estranged from her husband played by German actor Andreas Patton. Breaking Ice won the Grand Award for best TV-Drama at the New York Festival 2007.

In 2008 she worked with Andrea Loux (CH) on Hômage to Ingmar Bergman, a two-canal-video installation, shown at the ArtMuseum Bern, Switzerland. In 2011 she played the lead character in Anja Salomonowitz first feature film Spanien, Magdalena a mysterious woman caught up in a story between her ex-husband who is stalking her and Sava, played by French actor Grégoire Colin, a foreigner whom she falls in love with.
