= Rent a Pocher =

- Genre: Entertainment
- Created by: Ralf Husmann; Jobst Benthues
- Starring: Oliver Pocher
- Opening theme: Frank Popp Ensemble – Hip Teens Don't Wear Blue Jeans
- Country of origin: Germany
- Original language: German
- No. of episodes: 19

Production
- Running time: 60 minutes
- Production company: Brainpool TV

Original release
- Network: ProSieben
- Release: 3 April 2003 – 14 April 2006

Rent a Pocher is a German television show hosted by comedian Oliver Pocher. The weekly late-night show ran on Thursdays on the commercial television channel ProSieben and was produced by Brainpool. On the show, in addition to comedy bits and celebrity guests, Pocher offered to "rent" himself out to a viewer. For example, Pocher was rented as a babysitter, to pick grapes for wine and as an undertaker's assistant. The final episode aired on 14 April 2006.

== Awards ==
- 2004: Deutscher Fernsehpreis in the category "Best Comedy"
- 2004 & 2005: Deutscher Comedypreis as "The best comedy show"
