= Tanja Wenzel =

German film and TV actress (born 1978)

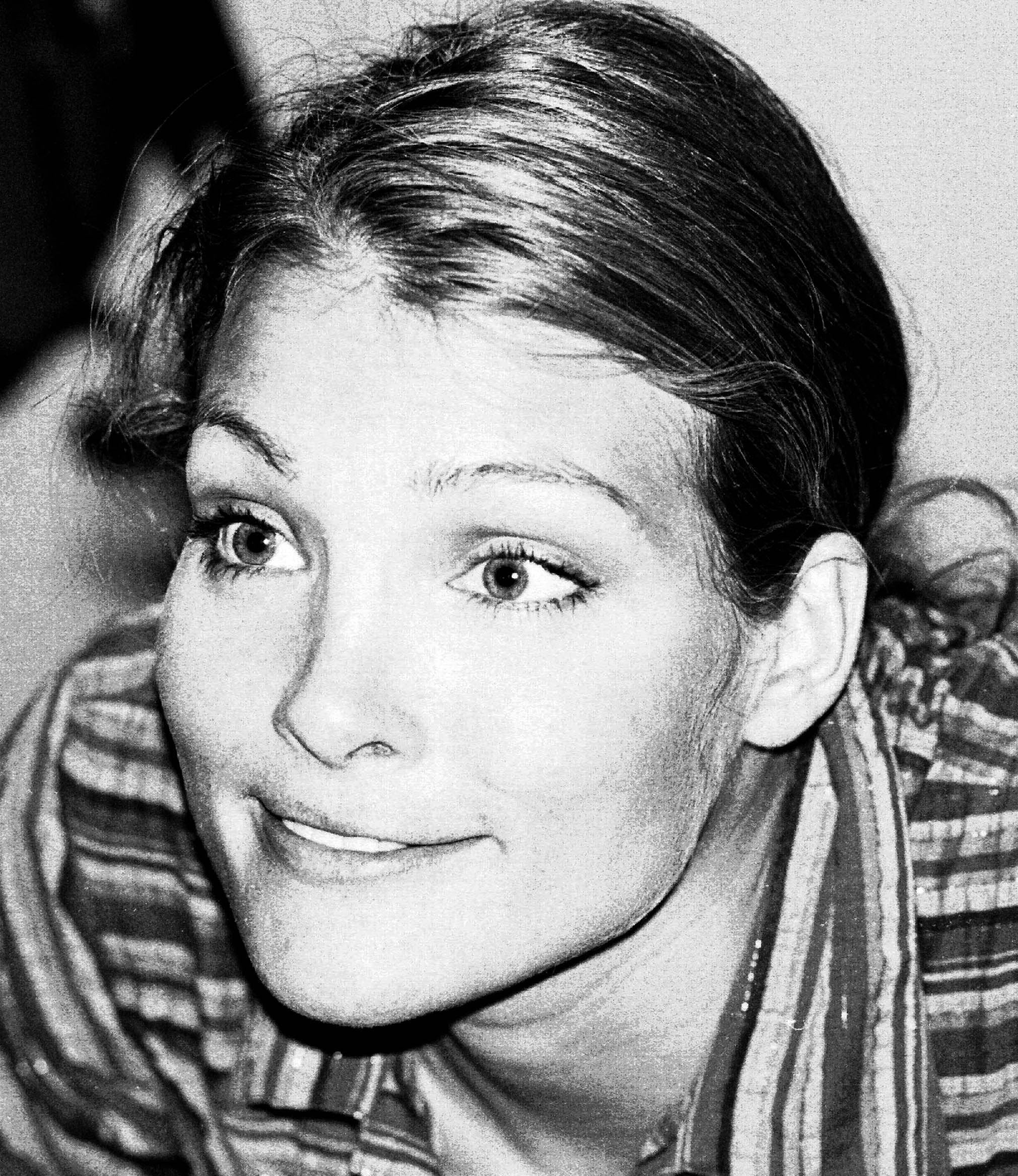
- Tanja Wenzel (2006)
- Born: 27 July 1978 (age 47); East Berlin, East Germany
- Occupation: Actress
- Years active: 1995-present

Tanja Wenzel (born 27 July 1978) is a German film and television actress. She is best known for her performance as Isabell Mohr / Brandner in the soap opera Verbotene Liebe.

== Selected filmography ==
Film
| Year | Title | Role | Notes |
|---|---|---|---|
| 2003 | Hero of the Gladiators | Flaminia | TV film |
| 2004 | Der Wixxer | Jennifer Pennymarket | |
| 2006 | Final Contract: Death on Delivery | Jenny | |
| 2006 | Wo ist Fred? | Vicky | |
| 2007 | Vollidiot | Paula | |

TV series
| Year | Title | Role | Notes |
|---|---|---|---|
| 1999–2004 | Verbotene Liebe | Isabell Mohr / Brandner | |
| 2009–2010 | Anna und die Liebe | Annett Darcy | |
