= List of Stromberg episodes =

Stromberg is a German adaptation of the British comedy television series The Office. The series is darker and more satirical than the original, and takes place in an insurance office. It aired for five seasons from 2004 to 2012.

== Series overview ==
Season	Episodes	Originally released	
Season	Episodes	First released	Last released
1	8	October 11, 2004	December 20, 2004
2	10	September 11, 2005	November 13, 2005
3	8	March 5, 2007	April 30, 2007
4	10	November 3, 2009	December 29, 2009
5	10	November 8, 2011	January 31, 2012

== Episodes ==
=== Season 1 (2004) ===
No. overall	No. in season	Original title	English title	Original release date
1	1	"Der Parkplatz"	"The parking lot"	October 11, 2004
2	2	"Feueralarm"	"Fire alarm"	October 18, 2004
3	3	"Mobbing"	"Bullying"	November 8, 2004
4	4	"Der Geburtstag"	"The birthday"	November 15, 2004
5	5	"Die gute Tat"	"The good deed"	November 22, 2004
6	6	"Diebstahl"	"Theft"	November 29, 2004
7	7	"Die Beförderung"	"The promotion"	December 13, 2004
8	8	"Der letzte Tag"	"The last day"	December 20, 2004

=== Season 2 (2005) ===
No. overall	No. in season	Original title	English title	Original release date
9	1	"Herr Becker"	"Mister Becker"	September 11, 2005
10	2	"Bowling"	"Bowling"	September 18, 2005
11	3	"Der Kurs"	"The course"	September 25, 2005
12	4	"Badminton"	"Badminton"	October 2, 2005
13	5	"Männerfreundschaft"	"Male friendship"	October 9, 2005
14	6	"Theo"	"Theo"	October 16, 2005
15	7	"Der Vertrag"	"The contract"	October 23, 2005
16	8	"Die Putzfrau"	"The cleaning woman"	October 30, 2005
17	9	"Die Kündigung"	"The termination"	November 6, 2005
18	10	"Tag der offenen Tür"	"Open day"	November 13, 2005

=== Season 3 (2007) ===
No. overall	No. in season	Original title	English title	Original release date
19	1	"Jennifer"	"Jennifer"	March 5, 2007
20	2	"Nicole"	"Nicole"	March 12, 2007
21	3	"Karneval"	"Carnival"	March 19, 2007
22	4	"Der Protest"	"The protest"	March 26, 2007
23	5	"Jochen"	"Jochen"	April 2, 2007
24	6	"Lulu"	"Lulu"	April 16, 2007
25	7	"Herr Loermann"	"Mister Loermann"	April 23, 2007
26	8	"Erika"	"Erika"	April 30, 2007

=== Season 4 (2009) ===
No. overall	No. in season	Original title	English title	Original release date
27	1	"Beziehungen"	"Relationships"	November 3, 2009
28	2	"Finsdorf"	"Finsdorf"	November 3, 2009
29	3	"Seelsorge"	"Pastoral care"	November 10, 2009
30	4	"Helge"	"Helge"	November 10, 2009
31	5	"Pärchenabend"	"Couples night"	November 17, 2009
32	6	"Sally"	"Sally"	November 24, 2009
33	7	"Gernot"	"Gernot"	December 1, 2009
34	8	"Die Rückkehr"	"The return"	December 15, 2009
35	9	"Herr Nehring"	"Mister Nehring"	December 22, 2009
36	10	"Die Abrechnung"	"The reckoning"	December 29, 2009

=== Season 5 (2011–12) ===
No. overall	No. in season	Original title	English title	Original release date
37	1	"Malik"	"Malik"	November 8, 2011
38	2	"Frau Papenacker"	"Ms Papenacker"	November 15, 2011
39	3	"Frau Wilhelmi"	"Ms Wilhelmi"	November 22, 2011
40	4	"Der Nachfolger"	"The Successor"	November 29, 2011
41	5	"Die Konferenz"	"The Conference"	December 6, 2011
42	6	"Herr Rüther"	"Mr Rüther"	December 13, 2011
43	7	"Cheyenne"	"Cheyenne"	January 10, 2012
44	8	"Jonas"	"Jonas"	January 17, 2012
45	9	"Der Rodach-Bonus"	"The Rodach Bonus"	January 24, 2012
46	10	"Der Abschied"	"The Farewell"	January 31, 2012
