= Der kleine Mann =

German television series

- Created by: Ralf Husmann
- Starring: Bjarne Mädel
- Country of origin: Germany
- No. of seasons: 1
- No. of episodes: 8

Der kleine Mann (English: "The Small Man") is a German television series that aired for eight episodes in 2009, created by Ralf Husmann and starring Bjarne Mädel as a store clerk who gains sudden fame after a television commercial appearance.

== See also ==
- List of German television series
