= 7 (Bushido album) =

Studio album by Bushido
- Released: 30 August 2007
- Recorded: 2007
- Genre: German hip hop
- Length: 75:29
- Label: ersguterjunge

Bushido chronology
Von der Skyline zum Bordstein zurück (2006)	7 (2007)	Heavy Metal Payback (2008)

Singles from 7
- 1. "Alles verloren" Released: 17 August 2007; 2. "Reich mir nicht deine Hand" Released: 16 November 2007

Professional ratings
Review scores
Source	Rating
AllMusic	4/5 stars
laut.de	3/5 stars

7 is the fifth studio album by German rapper Bushido. The album was already certified gold before its official release only through subscriptions. The album was released in a standard edition and a limited edition. The latter has a DVD that includes the music video for "Alles verloren", among other features.

A portion of the record has been played by an orchestra of 80 people in Bratislava.

== Meaning of the album title ==
In an interview Bushido explained that the title can mean different things. For example, it is his seventh album release (counting in an unknown demotape and King of KingZ) or the seven virtues of Bushido or also the number of the letters of his stage name Bushido.

== Track listing ==
No.	Title	Producer(s)	Length
1.	"Intro"		1:58
2.	"Hinter dem Horizont" (Behind the horizon)	Martelli	4:26
3.	"Es kann beginnen" (It can begin)	Bizzy Montana	3:46
4.	"So sein wie sie" (To be like them)	Auditory	3:46
5.	"Heile Welt" (Idyllic world) (featuring Chakuza)	Yvan Jaquemet	4:18
6.	"Dieser eine Wunsch" (This one wish)	Blanco	4:08
7.	"Alles verloren" (Everything lost)	Beatlefield	4:26
8.	"Abschaum" (Scum)	Decay	4:02
9.	"Zeiten ändern sich" (Times change)	Beatlefield	4:09
10.	"Gibt es Dich?" (Do you exist?)	Steddybeats	4:04
11.	"Keine Sonne" (No sun) (featuring Kay One)	Bushido	3:50
12.	"Wo Du hier gelandet bist" (Where you have landed here)	Beatlefield	3:43
13.	"Reich mir nicht deine Hand" (Don't give me your hand)	Beatlefield	3:59
14.	"Asylantenstatus" (Asylum seeker status (featuring Summer Cem))	David Dos Santos	4:09
15.	"Regenbogen" (Rainbow)	Steddybeats	3:45
16.	"Wer ich bin?" (Who I am?)	Screwaholic	3:51
17.	"Wahrheit" (Truth) (featuring Philippe Bühler)	Beatlefield	4:10
18.	"Stadt der Engel" (City of Angels) (featuring Nyze)	Beatlefield	3:40
19.	"Leben, das Du nicht kennst" (Life, you don't know)	Beatlefield	3:32
20.	"Outro"		2:01

Limited edition (DVD)
No.	Title	Length
1.	"Tourfilm"
2.	"Live"
3.	"Interview"
4.	"Blow-Up (Mega-Poster in Berlin)"
5.	"Making Of Alles Verloren"
6.	"Alles verloren" (Video)
7.	"Therapie TV"

Samples

A list of his songs, that contains samples from other musicians, is available online.

- "Alles verloren" contains a sample of "Hanging" from Plunkett & Macleane
- "Zeiten ändern sich" contains a sample of "Xerxes' Final Offer" by Tyler Bates, from film 300
- "Keine Sonne" contains a sample of "Wolf Creek: Main Title" by Francois Tetaz
- "Leben, das du nicht kennst" contains a sample of "Deep Silent Complete" by Nightwish

== Charts ==
=== Weekly charts ===
Chart (2007)	Peak position
Austrian Albums (Ö3 Austria)	2
German Albums (Offizielle Top 100)	1
Swiss Albums (Schweizer Hitparade)	2

=== Year-end charts ===
Chart (2007)	Position
Austrian Albums (Ö3 Austria)	49
German Albums (Offizielle Top 100)	41
Chart (2008)	Position
German Albums (Offizielle Top 100)	96

== Certifications ==
Region	Certification	Certified units/sales
Austria (IFPI Austria)	Platinum	20,000^{*}
Germany (BVMI)	Platinum	200,000^{^}
^{*} Sales figures based on certification alone.^{^} Shipments figures based on certification alone.
