= Nathalie Licard =

French television presenter

Nathalie Licard (born April 17, 1964, in Dax, Landes) is a French presenter. Her trademark is her pronounced French accent. Licard became known from May 7, 1997, above all through the Harald Schmidt Show.

== Life ==
After graduating from high school, Licard studied literature in France and trained in social management. She then founded a recording studio and moved to Cologne. According to Licard herself, she started working as an intern at the Harald Schmidt Show in 1997 and did not speak a word of German at the time. She acquired her knowledge of German herself in the course of the show.

From August 9 to September 10, 2004, Licard appeared on the Franco-German channel Arte. She spoke with guests on weekdays at 20:15 o'clock about programs that Arte showed in the evening. In addition to the irregular but frequent appearances in the Harald Schmidt Show, she had a permanent role in Harald Schmidt. On November 22, 2006, she hosted about half of the show instead of Harald Schmidt. She was also the "singer" of the ARD show band in Harald Schmidt, although she only had two vocal interludes there. In July 2007, Licard was the face of the theme month Vive la France! on Das Vierte. From March 6, 2012, she again spoke the opening credits and the commercial break announcements in the Harald Schmidt Show, which was reinstated in the program. Her French pronunciation of the wheat beer brand Schöfferhofer, for which she was also heard in commercials, became well known.

In 2004, Licard spoke the voice of the secret weapon in the animated film Derrick - Die Pflicht ruft. She was often part of the guessing team in the program Dings from the Roof. Since 2020, she has been part of the extended guessing team on the program Sag die Wahrheit. In 2008, Licard published the book Ich bin gespannt wie gekochtes Gemüse. A Frenchwoman in Germany. Licard made several appearances on the Sport1 programme Doppelpass for the European Football Championship 2016.
