= Vollidiot =

- Directed by: Tobi Baumann
- Starring: Oliver Pocher; Oliver Fleischer
- Release date: 12 April 2007
- Running time: 102 minutes
- Country: Germany
- Language: German

Vollidiot is a 2007 German comedy film based on the eponymous novel by Tommy Jaud.

== Cast ==
- Oliver Pocher – Simon Peters
- Oliver Fleischer – Flik
- Tanja Wenzel – Paula
- Tomas Spencer – Steve
- Anke Engelke – Eule
- Adriana Altaras – Lala
- Ellenie Salvo González - Marcia
- Carolin Kebekus: Marcia's friend
- Friederike Kempter – Tina
- Bettina Lamprecht - Dörte
- Julia Stinshoff – Katja
- Jana Pallaske – Petra
- Daniela Preuß – Daniela
- Adolfo Assor – Julian
- Michael Lott – Policeman Malte
