= Oliver Wnuk =

German actor (born 1976)

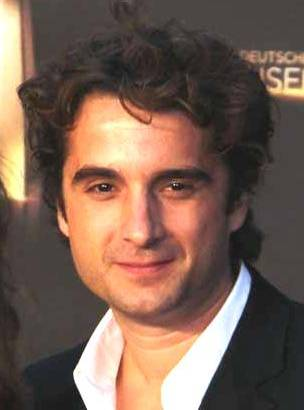
- Wnuk at Deutscher Fernsehpreis 2012
- Born: 28 January 1976 (age 50); Konstanz, West Germany
- Occupation: Actor
- Years active: 1998–present

Oliver Wnuk (born 28 January 1976) is a German actor. He is best known for his performance as Ulf Steinke in the TV series Stromberg.

== Selected filmography ==
Year	Title	Role	Notes
2000	Anatomy	Ludwig	
2001	Der Schuh des Manitu	Jack	
