= Brainpool TV =

German television production company

Brainpool TV GmbH
- Type: Subsidiary
- Industry: Entertainment; Talent management
- Founded: 1994; 32 years ago
- Founder: Jörg Grabosch; Martin Keß; Ralf Günther
- Headquarters: Cologne, Germany
- Key people: Jörg Grabosch (CEO, Production & Corporate Communications); Andreas Scheuermann (CEO, Licensing and Marketing, Financial Controlling & Legal and Business Affairs)
- Parent: VIVA Medien AG (2001–2006); Banijay Entertainment (2018–present)
- Divisions: Brainpool Entertainment; Brainpool Live Entertainment
- Website: www.brainpool.de/en

Brainpool TV GmbH is a German TV and film production company owned by French media congoulemate & production/distribution group Banijay Entertainment under its German division Banijay Germany, that is known for producing light entertainment in Germany and is active through its various holdings in the areas of TV production, live concerts and festivals, artist management, production services, marketing & rights exploitation, and the promotion of young talent located in Cologne. It was a subsidiary of VIVA Medien AG between 2001 and 2006, until a management buyout in December 2006.

== History ==
It was a subsidiary of VIVA Medien AG between 2001 and 2006, until a management buyout in January 2007, now owned by Banijay. The film Stromberg – The Movie was crowdfunded with €1,000,000 in one week by 3,000 fans in December 2011. In June 2015, Brainpool announced a layoff of 80 employees at the end of 2015, due to Stefan Raab's announced retirement from the television industry. However, the Cologne Labor Court deemed some layoffs to be unjustified and thus invalid.

In June 2001, Brainpool TV entered the French production business as part of its international expansion stragety by acquiring a 50% majority stake in French light entertainment and television outfit Show Devant Productions alongside its Switzerland-based production subsidiary Gregoire Furrer Productions, the buyout of a 50% stake in Show Devant Productions had gained Brainpool TV its own French production unit. Five days later of that same month, Brainpool TV had partnered with TV presenter Aleksandra Bechtel to launch a new joint production subsidiary based in Colonge entitled Hasen TV-Produktion GmbH, the new production subsidiary would develop and produce entertainment formats for the domestic and international markets with Brainpool TV's co-founders Jörg Grabosch and Bechtel's manager Vanessa Sartorius would led the new subsidiary.

In December 2006 two years following MTV Networks Europe had brought Brainpool TV and its parent VIVA Media back in 2004, MTV Networks Europe had sold its production subsidiary Brainpool TV back to its co-founders & managing directors Jörg Grabosch and Ralf Günther under a management buyout.

In August 2007, Brainpool TV announced it had acquired a 74.9% majority stake in Colonge-based German comedy & talenr production outfit behind the amateur stand-up format NightWash, D'nA Productions, effectively becoming a subsidiary of Brainpool TV and increased its comedy production state with founder of D'nA Productions & managing director Klaus-Jurgen Deuser continued leading the production unit under Brainpool TV.

On 2 July 2009, French media production house Banijay Entertainment had announced it had acquired a 50% stake in German television producer Brainpool TV, giving Banijay Entertainment's first German production company acquisition & it entered the German television production market with Brainpool becoming a subsidiary of Banijay Entertainment.

At the beginning of 2019 it was announced that Banijay Germany CEO and shareholder Marcus Wolter had been appointed as the new managing director. In June 2020, Banijay took over the rest of the shares.

In October 2023 after Brainpool TV's successful partnership with TV producer Stefan Raab that was formed in 1998 & led to the launch of the formats like Wok-WM and Schlag den Raab, Brainpool TV announced that it had partnered ways with TV producer Stefan Raab and they ended their partnership after 25 years, Brainpool had retained all rights to the extensive catalog of formats created by Raab over the previous quarter-century & continued to produce them. A year in February 2024 following Brainpool's ending of its successful partnerhsip with Stefan Raab and Brainpool assuming its formats made by Stefan Raab, Brainpool's production subsidiary Raab TV had been transitioned into a division under the Brainpool name & had it renamed Brainpool Entertainment while its team including its Creative Director Florian Göbels and Executive Producers Shiva Mobashery and Torsten Kluth continued to lead the rebranded division Brainpool Entertainment.

== Productions ==
- Die Harald Schmidt Show (until July 1998, from then Bonito)
- Die Wochenshow
- TV total
- Ladykracher
- Elton.tv
- Rent a Pocher
- RTL Promiboxen
- Der Bachelor
- Anke Late Night
- Stromberg
- Bundesvision Song Contest
- Unser Star für Oslo
- Unser Song für Deutschland
- Unser Star für Baku
- Unser Song für Malmö
- Unser Song für Dänemark
- Unser Song für Österreich
- Eurovision Song Contest 2011
- Eurovision Song Contest 2012
- Free European Song Contest
