= Angelika Kallwass =

German psychologist and TV host

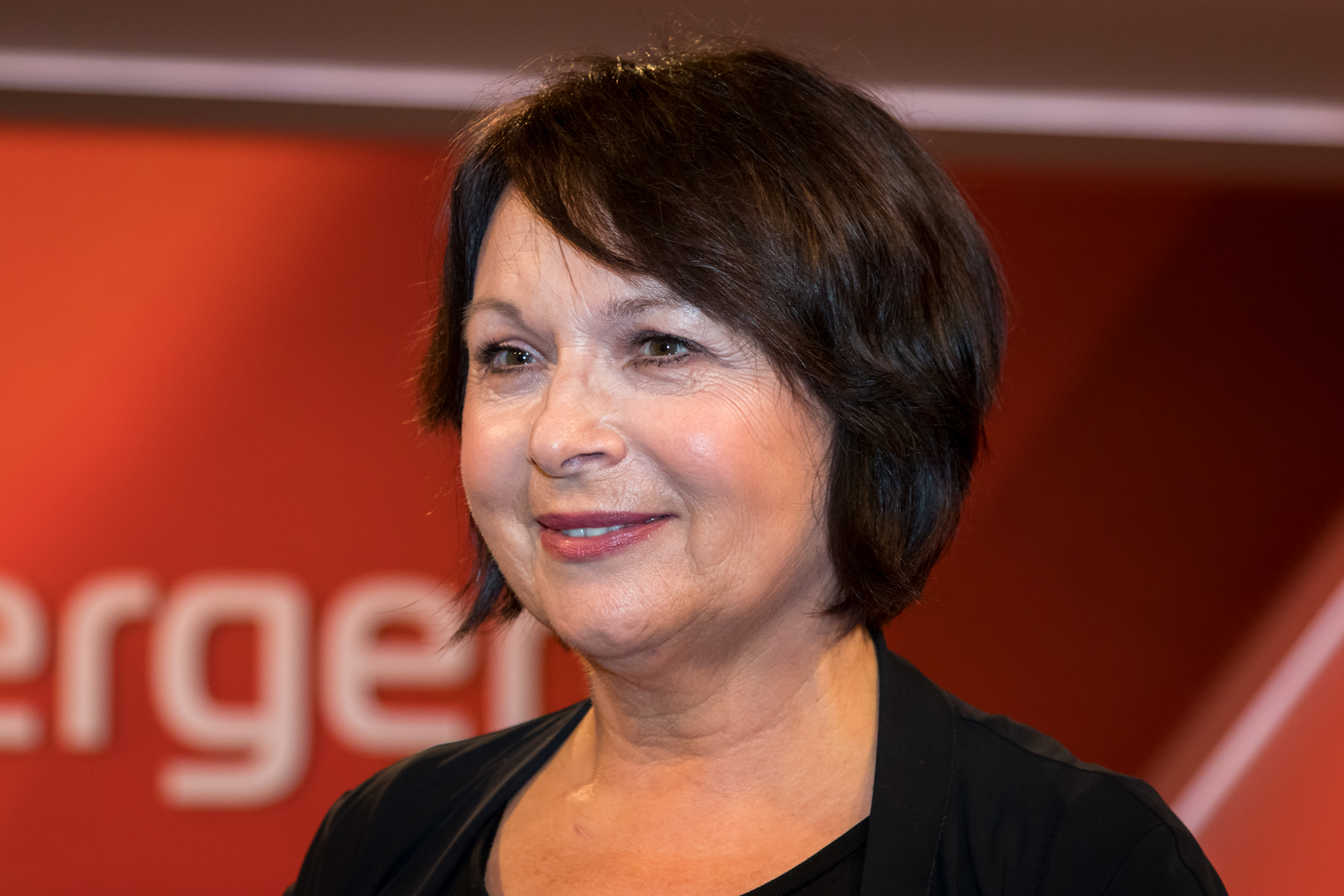
- Kallwass in 2017
- Born: Angelika Bergmann; 31 October 1948 (age 77); Cologne, Germany
- Occupation: Television host
- Known for: Zwei bei Kallwass

Angelika Bergmann-Kallwass (born 31 October 1948) is a German psychologist and television host.

== Biography ==
Angelika Bergmann-Kallwass was born in Cologne on 31 October 1948. After graduating from high school, she attended university, majoring in psychology and also studying economics.

Bergmann-Kallwass's career began with a teaching position at the Deutsche Angestellten-Akademie. In 2001, she became the host of the Sat. 1 TV show Kallwass greift ein!, formerly known as Zwei bei Kallwass.

Bergmann-Kallwass was married to Wolfgang Kallwass (1929—2018), a lawyer and psychologist, and has two daughters.

Since December 2016, Bergmann-Kallwass has been an official ambassador of the registered association intaktiv e.V., which campaigns against the circumcision of male children. She describes herself as an atheist and is a proponent of humanism.

== Bibliography ==
- Angelika Kallwass (2004). Verbotene Gefühle: Rache, Neid und Eifersucht; [... wir finden einen Weg]. Kreuz. ISBN 978-3-7831-2367-8.
- Angelika Kallwass (2004). Liebe leben: Sexualität in der Partnerschaft : [... wir finden einen Weg]. Kreuz. ISBN 978-3-7831-2368-5.
- Angelika Kallwass (2004). Stark gegen die Angst: ... wir finden einen Weg. Kreuz. ISBN 978-3-7831-2450-7.
- Angelika Kallwass (2004). Stark gegen die Angst: ... wir finden einen Weg. Kreuz. ISBN 978-3-7831-2450-7.
