= Manuel Andrack =

German writer and TV director

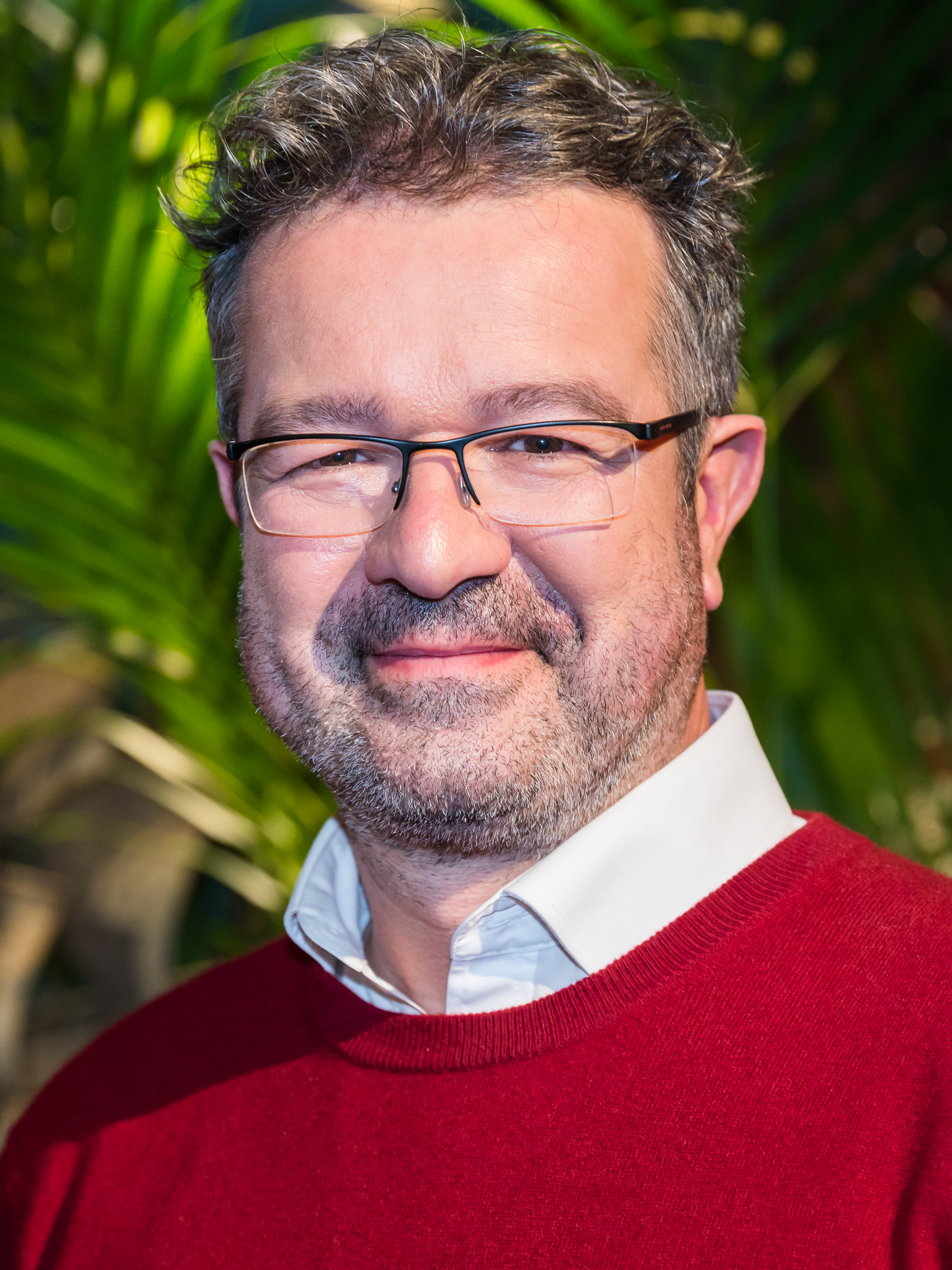
- Andrack in 2018
- Born: 23 June 1965 (age 60); Cologne, West Germany
- Known for: Journalist, television presenter, author

Manuel Claus Achim Andrack (born 23 June 1965) is a German journalist, television presenter, and author. He is best known as the sidekick of the Harald Schmidt Show.

== Early years ==
Andrack was born on 23 June 1965 in Cologne, where he has also lived most of his life. After receiving his Abitur in 1984 he enrolled at University of Cologne, majoring in theater studies, film, television and German studies with a minor in art history. He received a Magister Artium degree from the same university.

== Harald Schmidt Show ==
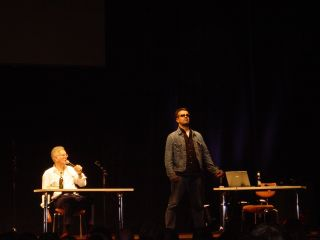
Andrack (right) and Harald Schmidt, 2005

Andrack first worked as an editor for the television production company CAT Entertainment RLT. In 1995, he got a job as the editor-in-chief of the popular Harald Schmidt Show. On 30 August 2000, he first appeared on-screen as Harald Schmidt's "sidekick" and went on to assume the role on a regular basis, which made him widely recognised. Prior to Andrack's on-screen introduction, Schmidt used an imaginary friend named Horst as his sidekick. The show gained new popularity as the combination Andrack/Schmidt added a family value to the broadcast.

== "Creative pause" ==
After the show ended in December 2004, Andrack took a "creative break", and wrote a book about hiking (Du musst wandern. Ohne Stock und Hut im deutschen Mittelgebirge., 2005) (In English: You have to hike. Without hiking stick and hat in the German Central Uplands). In this book he describes his hiking experiences. Andrack quit smoking in 1997, and started jogging as a "replacement drug". However, he soon developed knee problems, and had to switch to hiking, falling in love with this outdoors activity. He says he enjoys wandering with friends or with family, but prefers hiking alone. When hiking alone, he usually hikes at least 40 kilometers a day. His favourite hiking route is the Lieserpfad from Daun to Wittlich in the Eifel mountains.

During his creative pause, Andrack also wrote the book Meine Saison mit dem FC about his relationship with the football club 1. FC Köln.

== Further career ==
His working life continued when Harald Schmidt made him his chief dramatic adviser, among others for his show Kabarettsprogramm in 2004–2005. When the show was reworked in 2007, Andrack disappeared from the studio, but continued as an editor-in-chief of the program, until his contract was cancelled in mutual agreement in 2008.

In 2008, Andrack moved from Cologne to Saarbrücken. Today, Andrack writes columns and articles about hiking, which are published in Stern, Die Zeit and in Wandermagazin.

== Awards ==
- 2001 - Grimme Online Award TV
- 2002 - Botschafter des Bieres (ambassador of the beer)
- 2002 - Goldene Feder (golden quill), together with Harald Schmidt

== Works ==
- Manuel Andrack: Du musst wandern. Ohne Stock und Hut im deutschen Mittelgebirge. Verlag Kiepenheuer & Witsch, Köln 2005, ISBN 3-462-03488-X
- Manuel Andrack: Meine Saison mit dem FC. Verlag Kiepenheuer & Witsch, Köln 2005, ISBN 3-462-03584-3
- Manuel Andrack: Wandern. Das deutsche Mittelgebirge für Amateure und Profis. Verlag Kiepenheuer & Witsch, Köln 2006, ISBN 3-462-03745-5
- Guy Helminger, Manuel Andrack: Die Ruhe der Schlammkröte. Verlag Kiepenheuer & Witsch, Köln 2007, ISBN 3-462-03784-6
- Manuel Andrack: Von wem habe ich das bloß. Auf den Spuren der Ahnen. Eine Gebrauchsanweisung. KiWi, Köln 2008, ISBN 978-3-462-04038-8
- Manuel Andrack: 2 mit Grips und GPS. Cache! Wir finden ihn!. Mixtvision Verlagsges., München 2009, ISBN 978-3-939435-22-8
