= Schmidt & Pocher =

- Genre: Variety/Talk
- Presented by: Harald Schmidt & Oliver Pocher
- Composer: Helmut Zerlett
- Country of origin: Germany
- Original language: German

Production
- Production locations: Studio 449, Cologne, Germany
- Running time: 60 min.
- Production company: Bonito TV

Original release
- Network: Das Erste
- Release: 25 October 2007 – 16 April 2009

Schmidt & Pocher was a German late-night talk show hosted on Das Erste by comedians Harald Schmidt and Oliver Pocher in the Thursday 10:45 pm time slot from 25 October 2007 to 16 April 2009. It was the successor of Harald Schmidt on the same network.

== Music ==
The house band was led by Helmut Zerlett.

- Helmut Zerlett – keyboards
- Axel Heilhecker – guitars
- Rosko Gee – bass
- Antoine Fillon – drums
- Jürgen Dahmen – piano
- Thomas Heberer – trumpets
- Mel Collins – saxophone
