= Harald Schmidt =

German actor, comedian and television presenter (born 1957)

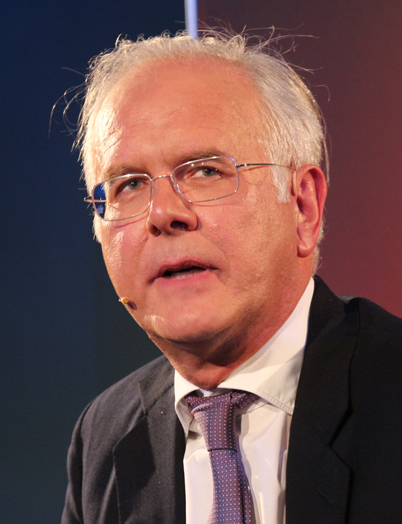
- Schmidt in 2015
- Born: Harald Franz Schmidt; 18 August 1957 (age 69); Neu-Ulm, Bavaria, West Germany
- Occupations: Television presenter, comedian, actor, writer
- Years active: 1988–present

Harald Franz Schmidt (born 18 August 1957) is a German actor, comedian, television presenter and writer best known as the host of two popular German late-night shows.

== Early and private life ==
A son of refugees who fled from Sudetenland (now Czech Republic) in 1945, Schmidt spent his youth in Swabian Nürtingen. Due to his strict Catholic upbringing he devoted time to the Roman Catholic church, serving as choirmaster and playing the organ.

At the age of 21, Schmidt went to Stuttgart to attend drama school for three years. After that, he gained on-stage experience at Städtische Bühne (Municipal Stage) in Augsburg. His first role was that of the 2nd Mamaluke in Lessing's Nathan the Wise. In 1984, Schmidt became a lyricist for the cabaret Kom(m)ödchen in Düsseldorf and in 1986, was honoured as "Best Newcomer cabaret artist" and toured through Germany with his own show.

In October 2005, his daughter Amelie was born. Schmidt resides in Cologne with his partner Ellen Hantsch, a school teacher, and their five children, the eldest being from a previous relationship. Little is known about the children and their two mothers as Schmidt shields them from the public. In interviews he hardly talks about them.

== Television career ==
Before long, TV noticed the talented young comedian, and in 1988, Schmidt began to host his first TV show, MAZ ab. This was followed by shows like Psst! and Schmidteinander. The biggest boost to his career occurred in 1992, when Schmidt started hosting the popular Saturday night show Verstehen Sie Spaß? (a variation of Candid Camera). Schmidt was awarded Germany's most important TV award, the Adolf-Grimme-Preis, which would be followed by many others. Just one year later, he was honoured as the "Entertainer of the Year" and awarded the Bambi Award, as well as the Golden Camera.

In 2004, Schmidt toured through Germany with a live comedy show, featuring his former late night show sidekick Manuel Andrack.

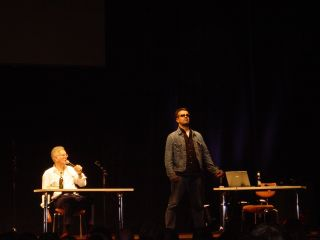
Schmidt (left) with sidekick Manuel Andrack live in Karlsruhe, 2005

=== Harald Schmidt Show ===
In 1995, Schmidt changed from the publicly funded TV station ARD to the privately owned German television network Sat.1 in order to host a late night show similar to Late Night with Conan O'Brien and Late Show with David Letterman. The show, named Die Harald Schmidt Show, featured stand-up comedy as well as famous national and international guests. From 30 June 2003, the show was broadcast five days a week, including Monday evening. On 8 December 2003, Schmidt suddenly announced the end of the show, following a change of management of Sat.1. The last show was aired on 23 December 2003. The following suspension of the TV format lasted until 2011, when the show returned to Sat.1.

=== Harald Schmidt ===
In 2004, Schmidt began a second run with a new show named Harald Schmidt on publicly funded ARD, where he had begun his television career 16 years earlier. The show no longer featured "celebrity" interviews but dealt even more with the discussion of current events in a rather freely associative manner. Manuel Andrack returned as his sidekick.

On his first show after the break, Schmidt appeared with long hair and a full beard, making fun of his long absence from the public. After summer break in 2005 the "celebrity guest" segment was reintroduced.

=== Schmidt & Pocher ===
Late in 2007, Manuel Andrack was replaced by comedian Oliver Pocher, who had a more active part than his predecessor, and some other elements changed as well. The broadcast's title was changed to Schmidt & Pocher, trying to attract a younger audience. Pocher appeared "less intellectual", a fact that caused some criticism among Schmidt's core audience and broadsheet newspaper comments in Germany.

=== Harald Schmidt ===
After the termination of Schmidt & Pocher, Schmidt again hosted the show under its former title Harald Schmidt, this time without any sidekick.

=== Relaunch of the Harald Schmidt Show ===
On 15 September 2011, Schmidt returned to his former network Sat.1, picking up its former name of Die Harald Schmidt Show again. However, Sat.1 cancelled the show after one season due to low ratings. Starting 4 September 2012, new episodes were shown on Sky Hits HD and Sky Atlantic HD, two channels of the German Pay-TV network Sky Deutschland. Schmidt hosted his very last show on 13 March 2014. He announced he would not return to TV. SKY published the last show on video-sharing website YouTube.

== Concept and personalities ==
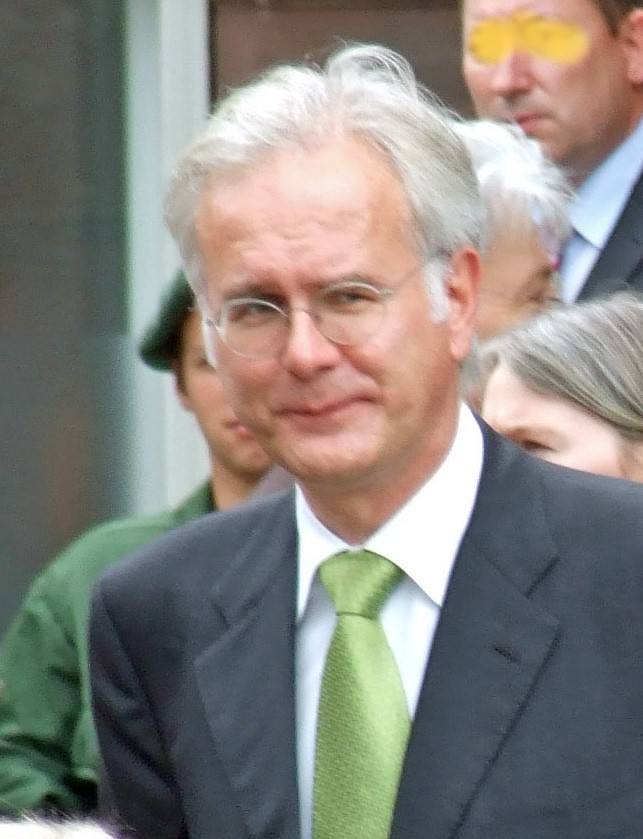
Schmidt in 2007

The self-proclaimed hypochondriac became popular for his cynical jokes, cruel remarks and wry intellectual wit. (Even though he is obsessed with health he was able to lampoon this weak spot in a self ironic TV commercial for a medicine curing colds.) Schmidt models himself after people like Johnny Carson and Conan O'Brien, but adds factors and qualities to his show himself.

He engaged in long, seemingly boring conversations with his "supervising producer" Manuel Andrack (known as "chief dramatic adviser"), who sat at a desk next to Schmidt's until 2005, and, like David Letterman, also included his staff in the show, for instance, his cue card girl Suzana Novinscak and his band leader Helmut Zerlett. Schmidt celebrated the return of French woman Nathalie Licard in his ARD era (like Zerlett she is still part of Schmidt's team). In Schmidt's original Harald Schmidt Show (1995–2003), Licard was involved in the goings-on in front of the audience too.

== Criticism ==
Especially during the first years of Die Harald Schmidt Show, Schmidt was sometimes criticised for making fun of minorities like foreigners or gays. He also did Adolf Hitler imitations in his show (in one of these he as Hitler warned young people not to vote for racist and nationalistic parties). Schmidt's more unorthodox and politically incorrect jokes have garnered the show a reputation as cult television and his supporters accused critics of being incapable of understanding satire.

In the later years of its first run on Sat.1 (circa 2001–2003), the Harald Schmidt Show became a critics' favourite due to Schmidt's "intellectual" sense of humour, especially for incorporating many references to high culture (be it literature, theater, classical music, painting, or cinema), history, and philosophy. Another recurring item were forays into surrealism and absurdity that were pretty much anathema to commercial or "mainstream" interest: For example, Schmidt hosted one show completely in French (re-broadcast a few days later on Franco-German channel Arte, this Show en Francais episode gained glowing reviews from French critics). On another occasion, the screen was blacked for half of the show making it into a "radio broadcast". Another time, Schmidt disproved a critic who had written that it is impossible to spend several minutes on TV just cracking nuts without anybody saying anything. The show's reviews and renown among critics gradually worsened during the years of its ARD run (2004–2010), especially because Schmidt's choice of Oliver Pocher as a new sidekick was considered a mistake that diminished the entire show's quality.

== Other activities ==
Schmidt's first book, Tränen im Aquarium, was published in 1993, the second, Mulatten in gelben Sesseln, in 2005.

1994–2013 H. Schmidt worked as a columnist for one of the major German weekly news magazines, Focus. Many of his articles were assembled and released as books. The first of these, Warum? ("Why?"), was published in 1997; another nine books followed.

Schmidt also voiced an audiobook, Jerry Cotton – Mein erster Fall beim FBI (2003).

== Awards ==
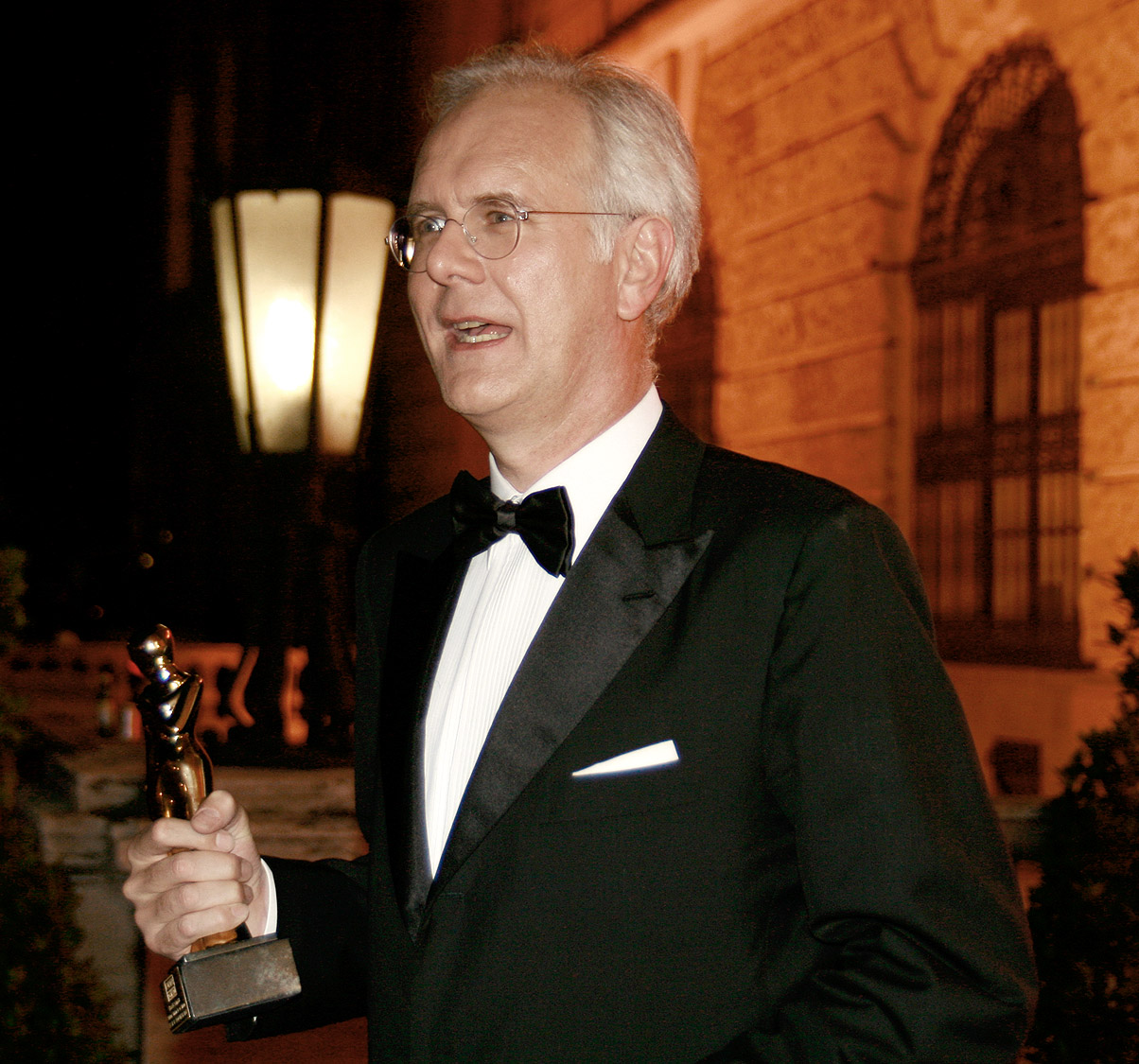
Schmidt at the Romy TV awards in 2011

Schmidt has won more than 30 television, comedy and theatrical awards, including three German Television Awards, the viewers choice award Bambi, the Grimme Award, the Golden Camera and the RTL Golden Lion as best talk show host. In 2013, he became a Cavalier of Ordre national de la Légion d'honneur.

== Work ==
=== Filmography ===
Film

Year	Title	Role	Director
1995	Nich' mit Leo	Bishop Heinrich	Ralf Gregan
1999	Late Show	Conny Scheffer	Helmut Dietl
2004	7 Dwarves – Men Alone in the Wood	"The Best Jester" Candidate	Otto Waalkes
2005	About the Looking for and the Finding of Love	Psychoanalyst	Helmut Dietl
2011	Stopped on Track	himself	Andreas Dresen
2012	Zettl	Conny Scheffer	Helmut Dietl
2016	Burg Schreckenstein	Graf Schreckenstein	Ralf Huettner
2017	Timm Thaler oder Das verkaufte Lachen	Announcer	Andreas Dresen

Television

Year	Title	Role	Channel	Genre / Notes
1988–1991	MAZ ab!	Host	West 3, Das Erste	Quiz show
1988–1989	Hollymünd	Host	WDR	Music show
1990–1995; 2007	Pssst...	Host	West 3, Das Erste	Panel game, quiz show
1990–1994	Schmidteinander	Co-host with Herbert Feuerstein	West 3, Das Erste	Satirical comedy show / 50 episodes
1991	Gala – Weihnachten mit Harald Schmidt	Host	NDR	Gala
1992–1995	Verstehen Sie Spaß?	Host	Das Erste	Hidden camera reality TV series
1995–2003, 2011–2014	Harald Schmidt Show	Host	Sat.1	Late-night talk show
1998	McSchmidt Studio	Host	Sat.1	Sports talk / 1998 FIFA World Cup / 35 episodes
2004–2007; 2009–2011	Harald Schmidt	Host	Das Erste	Late-night talk show
2006, 2007, 2008	Bambi Awards	Host	Das Erste	Award ceremony
2007–2009	Schmidt & Pocher	Host	Das Erste	Late-night talk show
2006, 2008	Olympia mit Waldi & Harry	Co-host with Waldemar Hartmann	Das Erste	Late-night-show, Sports talk / 2006 Winter Olympics; 2008 Summer Olympics / 14 episodes
2008	Das Traumschiff	Oskar Schifferle	ZDF	TV series / 9 episodes
2008	Teufelsbraten	Salesman	WDR/ARTE	TV film / directed by Hermine Huntgeburth
2009	Stuttgart Homicide	Prof. Dr. Lukas Gotthardt	ZDF	TV series / 1 episode
2015	Kulturplatz	Host	SRF 1	Art and culture / 2 episodes

=== Discography ===
- 1997: Die Besten Sprüche aus der Harald Schmidt Show
- 1998: Die besten Harald Schmidt Sprüche, Vol. 2
- 2004: Schmidtgift
- 2005: LiveMitSchmidt

=== Videography ===
- 2000: Harald Schmidt – Respektlos und rezeptfrei
- 2004: Die Harald Schmidt – The Best of Vol. 1 & 2 + Golden Goals
- 2005: Harald Schmidt – Best of Harald Schmidt 2005
- 2006: Harald Schmidt – Best of Harald Schmidt 2006
- 2007: Harald Schmidt – Gala
- 2008: Harald Schmidt & Oliver Pocher – Das erste Jahr: Best of
- 2011: Ich hab schon wieder überzogen / Überstehen ist alles
- 2011: Die Harald Schmidt Show – Die ersten 100 Jahre: 1995–2003
- 2013: Die Harald Schmidt Show – Die zweiten 100 Jahre: 1995–2003

=== Bibliography ===
- 1993: Tränen im Aquarium. Ein Kurzausflug ans Ende des Verstandes, ISBN 3-462-02302-0.
- 1997: Warum? Neueste Notizen aus dem beschädigten Leben, ISBN 3-462-02653-4.
- 1999: Wohin? Allerneueste Notizen aus dem beschädigten Leben, ISBN 3-462-02864-2.
- 2002: Quadrupelfuge. Variationen über 4 Themen auf 240 Seiten, ISBN 3-462-03125-2.
- 2002: Warum und wohin? Gesammelte Notizen aus dem beschädigten Leben, ISBN 3-548-36339-3.
- 2004: Avenue Montaigne. Roman, très nouveau, ISBN 3-462-03380-8.
- 2004: Warum und wohin?, ISBN 3-548-84017-5.
- 2005: Mulatten in gelben Sesseln. Die Tagebücher 1945 – 52 und die Focus-Kolumnen, ISBN 3-462-03642-4.
- 2006: Avenue Montaigne & Quadrupelfuge, ISBN 3-462-03673-4.
- 2007: Sex ist dem Jakobsweg sein Genitiv. Eine Vermessung, ISBN 978-3-462-03954-2.
- 2009: Ich hatte 3000 Frauen. Deutschlands größter TV-Star packt aus, ISBN 978-3-462-04104-0.
- 2011: Fleischlos schwanger mit Pilates. Erfolgreiche Frauen sagen, wie es geht, ISBN 978-3-462-04293-1.
- 2022: In der Frittatensuppe feiert die Provinz ihre Triumphe. Thomas Bernhard. Eine kulinarische Spurensuche, ISBN 978-3-7106-0533-8.

== Literature ==
- 2003: Kay Sokolowsky: Late Night Solo – Die Methode Harald Schmidt. Aufbau-Taschenbuch-Verlag, Berlin, ISBN 3-7466-7044-6.
- 2004: Mariam Lau: Harald Schmidt – Eine Biografie. Ullstein Verlag, Berlin, ISBN 3-548-36675-9.
- 2006: Peter Reinwarth: Wer ist Harald Schmidt. Edition Steffan, Köln, ISBN 3-923838-53-0.
- 2009: Julia Wenmakers: Rechtliche Grenzen der neuen Formen von Satire im Fernsehen. Wo hört bei Stefan Raab und Harald Schmidt der Spaß auf? Verlag Dr. Kovac, Hamburg, ISBN 978-3-8300-4299-0.
