= Oliver Pocher =

German comedian and entertainer

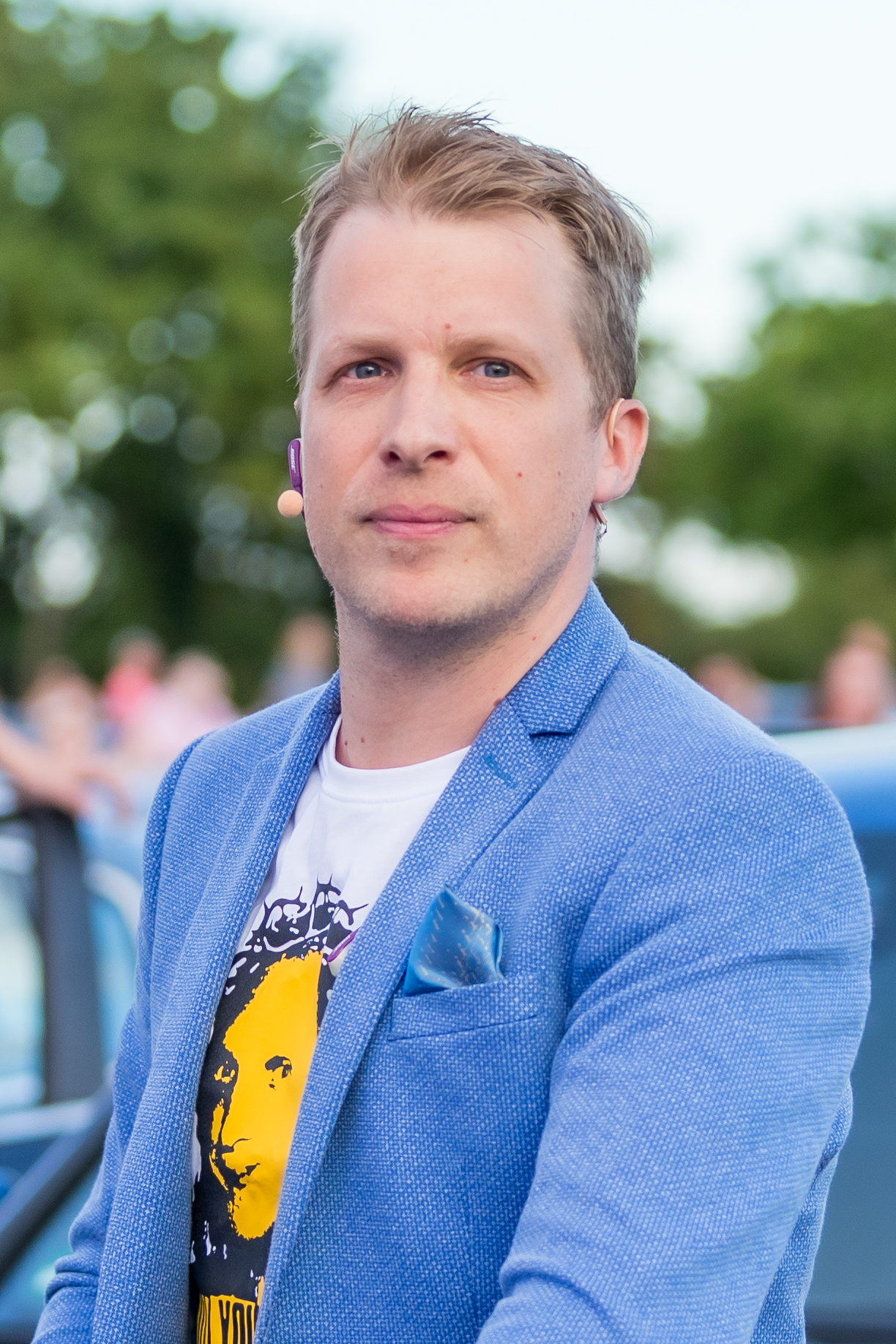
- Pocher in 2020
- Born: 18 February 1978 (age 48); Hanover, West Germany
- Occupations: Comedian; entertainer; television host
- Years active: 1999–present
- Known for: Rent a Pocher (2003–2006); Schmidt & Pocher (2007–2009); Die Oliver Pocher Show (2009–2011)
- Spouses: Sandy Meyer-Wölden (m. 2010–2014) Amira Aly (m. 2017–2024)
- Children: 5
- Website: oliverpocher.de

Oliver Pocher (born 18 February 1978) is a German comedian, entertainer, television personality and host. Pocher began his career with part-time work in radio and as a DJ before making his first television appearance in 1998 on the Bärbel Schäfer's show. He later hosted several programs, including Rent a Pocher and Die Oliver Pocher Show.

== Early life and professional training ==
Pocher is the son of Gerhard and Jutta Pocher; he was born and grew up in Hanover, West Germany. His parents are Jehovah's Witnesses and he too was raised as one. In 2007, Pocher stated that, unlike his parents, he had no contact with the organisation anymore as he claimed "not to have agreed with their rules".

Reports that Pocher had attended a Waldorf school were denied by his management. Pocher successfully completed his training as an insurance broker at "Signal Iduna Bauspar AG".

During the time of his apprenticeship, he had some part-time jobs at various radio stations and as a DJ in clubs and during family celebrations. He also appeared in the comedian group Holla-Bolla and as an entertainer at Birte Karalus, a German chat show. After his apprenticeship, he worked for the Swiss life insurance company "Schweizerische Lebensversicherungs- und Rentenanstalt" (today: SwissLife) and the "HDI Lebensversicherung AG" (HDI life insurance).

== Career ==
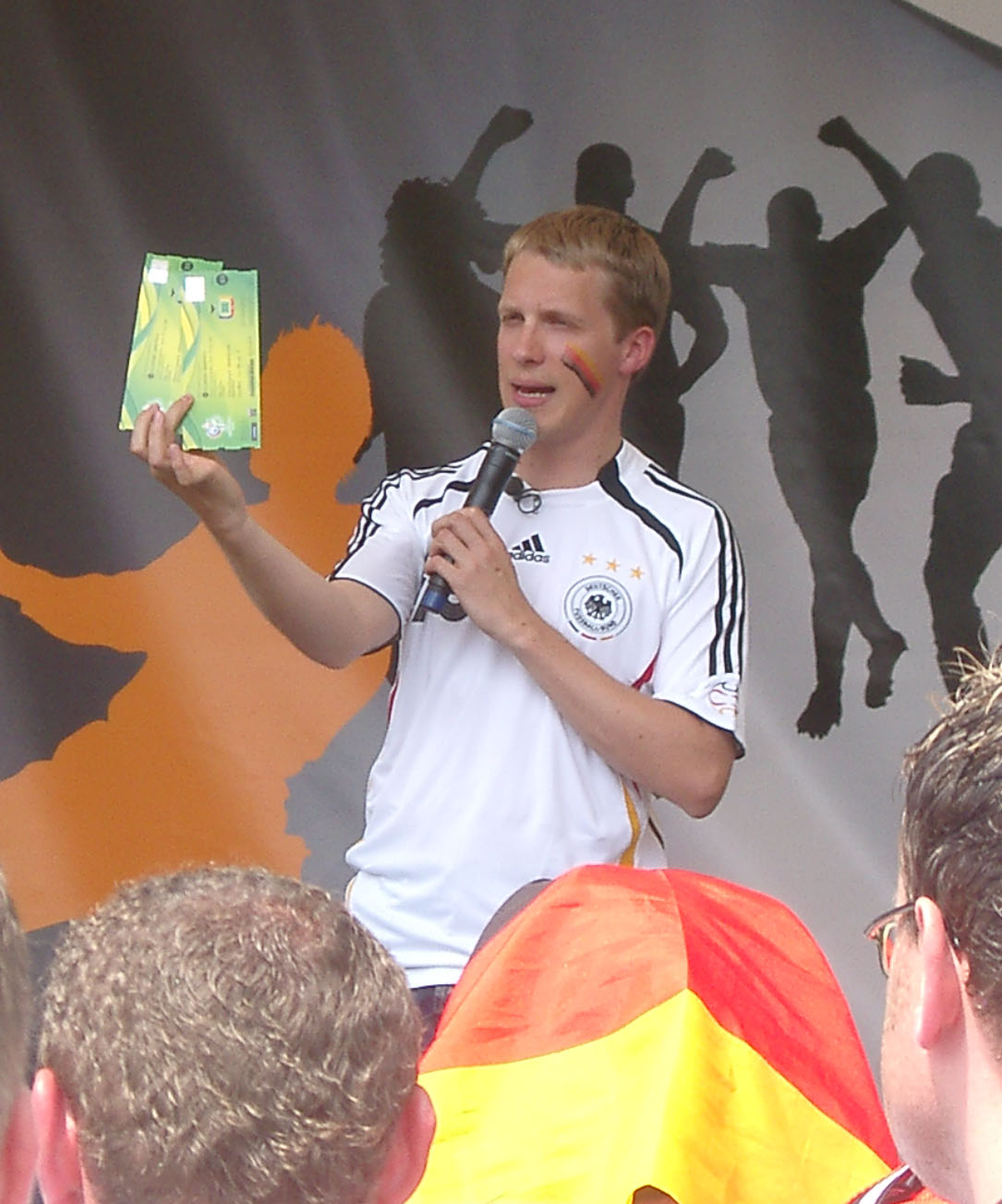
Pocher in 2006

Pocher's first television appearance was on 28 October 1998 at the afternoon chat show of Bärbel Schäfer. Pocher was given five minutes to make the audience laugh.

On 29 September 1999, he presented the show Chart Surfer Trash Top 100, Was geht ab, Planet Viva and finally 2002 his own show Alles Pocher, ... oder was?.

Between January 2003 and 14 April 2006, Pocher presented the show Rent a Pocher on ProSieben.

In 2006, he recorded the single "Schwarz und Weiß", a song dedicated to the 2006 FIFA World Cup. A music video was made featuring Pocher as several pressbox speakers, as well as him performing the song in front of fans dressed in Team Germany attire.

From October 2007 to April 2009, Pocher joined established late-night host Harald Schmidt's show on the Das Erste television channel, with the show being called Schmidt und Pocher.

In 2008, his third single "Bringt ihn heim" ("bring him home") was released. It is a song for the European Football Championship of 2008. The original version is Baschi's number-one hit (Switzerland) "Bring en hei".

Pocher's contract was not renewed after April 2009, so he was hired by Sat.1 instead to present his own late-night show, Die Oliver Pocher Show. The show's ratings were always below the station's average and even slipping over the course of the run until it was cancelled in March 2011.

In the RTL show Pocher - gefährlich ehrlich! (Pocher – Dangerously Honest!), he appeared with his wife Amira from 2020 to 2021. Since 2022, he had been hosting the follow-up format to 5 gegen Jauch (5 Against Jauch). In April 2023, he participated in the ProSieben show Die Unschlagbaren – Wer besiegt die Stars? (The Unbeatable – Who Can Defeat the Stars?). In the show, the celebrity challengers travel to different countries to challenge and defeat citizens in various challenges.

In February 2024, the RTLzwei channel announced that Pocher will host two new shows – Ein Haus voller Geld (A House Full of Money) and Dinge gibt's (Things There Are).

== Personal life ==
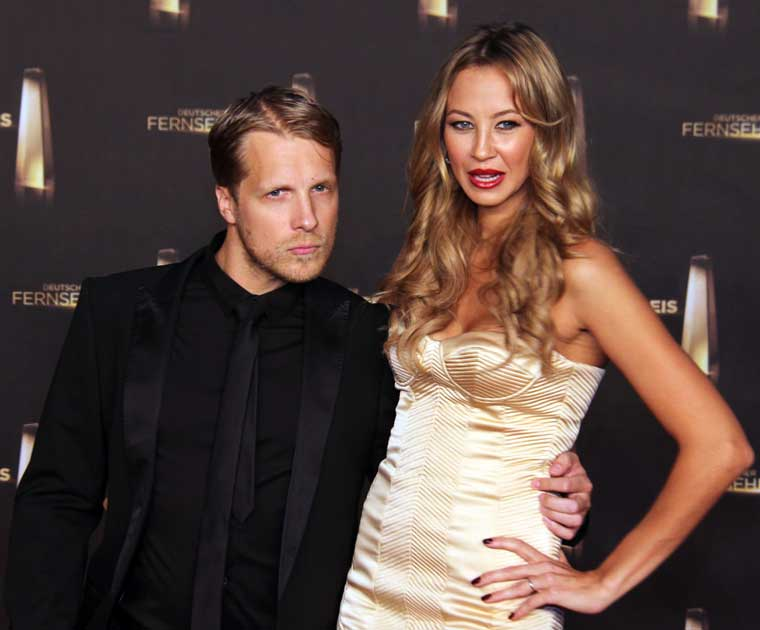
Pocher with his then-wife Sandy Meyer-Wölden

From 2010 to 2014, Pocher was married to Alessandra "Sandy" Meyer-Wölden. They share three children.

Pocher dated German tennis player Sabine Lisicki for almost three years. The couple split in 2016.

In 2016, Pocher met make-up artist Amira Aly on the dating platform Tinder; the relationship led to a wedding in 2019. Their sons were born in 2019 and 2020. The couple announced their separation in a podcast in August 2023. The divorce from Amira Pocher took place in July 2024.

== Criticism and scandals ==
Pocher has been widely criticised for his jokes at the expense of others. After he recommended plastic surgery to a woman of the audience of the Wetten, dass..? ("Wanna Bet..?") episode on 22 January 2005, he was sued for damages of €25,000. Although he apologised to her on the phone and repeated this apology in public during one of his shows, he was not able to solve this conflict out of court. On 11 January, Pocher was sentenced by the district court of Hanover to pay a fine of €6,000. The judge in charge called Pocher's statement ("You look quite old for your age") a "very insulting comment".

The public insulting continued in January 2008 during the TV show Johannes B. Kerner when Pocher once again made fun of the same woman's appearance and mocked the verdict. As a result, another suit was filed against him. The victim's lawyer explained that the woman was insulted and that the topic is repeatedly brought up by people whom she meets during her work. Pocher did not comment on this.

Pocher caused a scandal in July 2005 during the ZDF (German broadcasting station) show Gottschalk & Friends when he insulted Mariah Carey and later accidentally spat water onto her. For this action, he was harshly criticised by some newspapers and by the broadcast station in charge. Gottschalk himself kept calm and commented on the incident: "Of course I don't want to have jokes at the expense of others during my show. ... If you invite Pocher to your show, however, you should expect a different atmosphere than with, for example, Alfred Biolek."

When Pocher mocked the personal life of singer Sarah Connor and her reality show, Connor sued Pocher. While the exact outcome of the lawsuit is not known, Pocher did apologise to Connor.

In January 2009, during the TV show Schmidt & Pocher, Pocher spoofed the Hitler assassin Claus Schenk Graf von Stauffenberg, who is portrayed by Tom Cruise in Valkyrie. He had to face negative feedback for this and thereafter the broadcasting commission examined this incident.

In February 2014, at the Vienna Opera Ball, Pocher was interviewed by Mirjam Weichselbraun with Kim Kardashian. He joked that he was only going to dance when "Niggas in Vienna" was played.

== Shows ==
Title	Channel	Period
Alles Pocher, … oder was?	VIVA Germany	2002
Rent a Pocher	ProSieben	January 2003 – 13 April 2006
Trash Top 100	VIVA	2004
Bundesvision Song Contest 2005	ProSieben	12 February 2005
Pochers WM-Countdown	ProSieben	3 April 2006 – 5 June 2006
Pocher zu Gast in Deutschland	ProSieben	12 June 2006 – 6 July 2006
Gameshow-Marathon	ProSieben	15 January – 12 March 2007
Schmidt & Pocher	Das Erste	25 October 2007 – 16 April 2009
Sportfreunde Pocher – Alle gegen die Bayern	Sat.1	27 June 2009 – 25 July 2009
Alarm für Cobra 11 (guest appearance)	RTL	3 September 2009
5 gegen Jauch	RTL	4 September 2009
The Oliver Pocher Show	Sat.1	October 2009 – March 2011
Samstag LIVE!	Sky Deutschland	Since August 2011

== Discography ==
=== Albums ===
- 2007: It's My Life – Aus dem Leben eines B-Promis

=== Singles ===
- 2006: "Schwarz und Weiß"
- 2007: "Ich kann nix dafür" (with Nena & Stephan Remmler)
- 2008: "Bringt ihn heim" (68th-best-selling single in Germany of 2008)
- 2009: "Kennst du die Stars" (Bushido feat. Oliver Pocher)
- 2010: "Wir gehen nur zurück um Anlauf zu nehm'"

=== DVDs ===
- 2005: Best of Pocher: Aufstieg & Fall eines B-Promis (2 DVDs)
- 2007: It's My Life – Aus dem Leben eines B-Promis (2 DVDs)
- 2008: Best of Schmidt & Pocher (2 DVDs)
- 2009: Gefährliches Halbwissen – Die Weltrekord Live-Show (2 DVDs)

== Filmography ==
- 2005: Durch die Nacht mit Moritz Bleibtreu und Oliver Pocher (TV)
- 2006: 7 Zwerge – Der Wald ist nicht genug
- 2006: Hui Buh: The Goofy Ghost
- 2007: Vollidiot, as Simon Peters
- 2009: Alarm für Cobra 11, as Oliver Sturm
- 2010: Hanni & Nanni, as Rüdiger Hack
- 2012: Freshly Squeezed
- 2015: Bruder vor Luder
- 2017: Unter deutschen Betten

== Awards ==
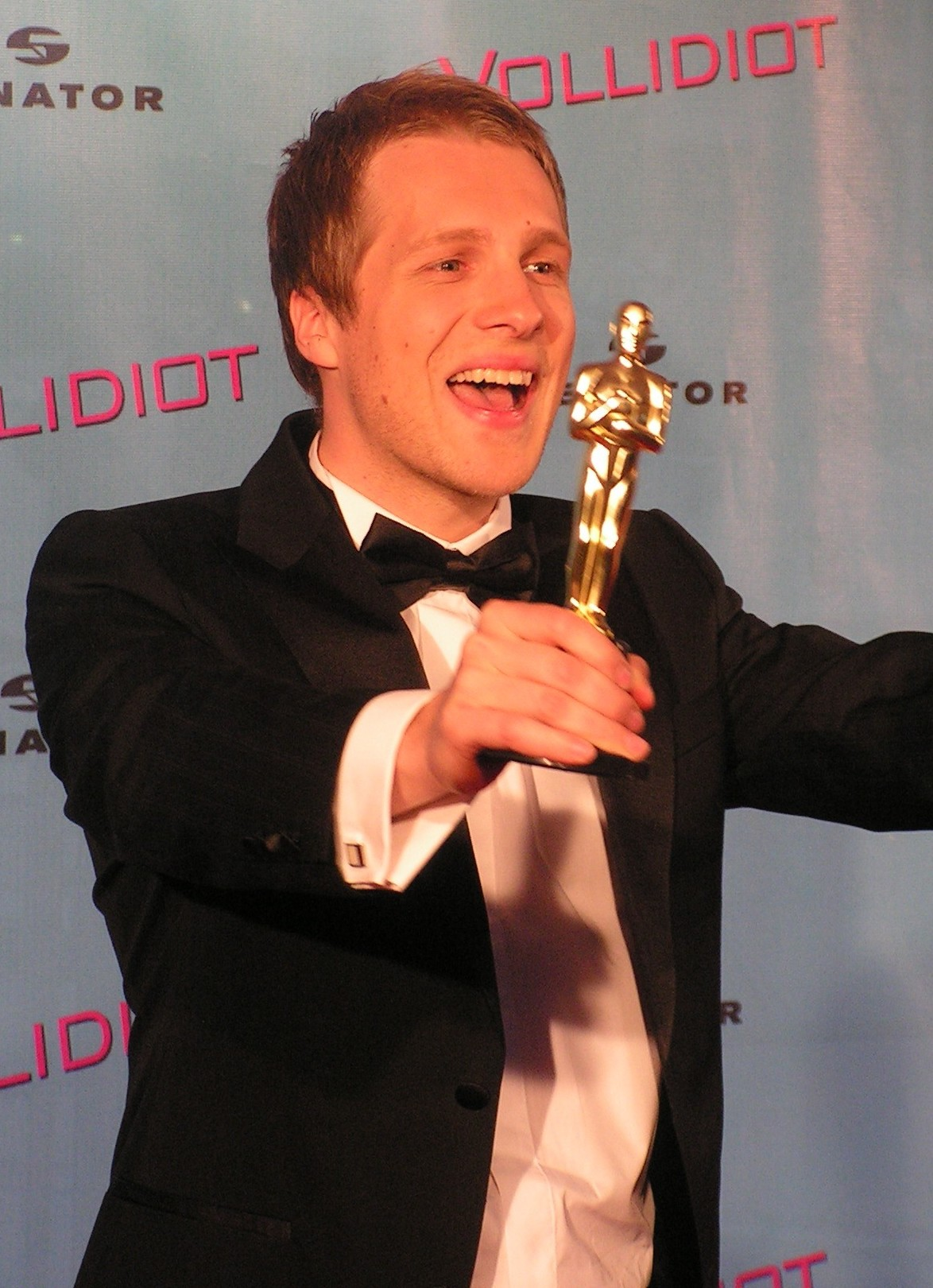
Pocher at the 2007 premiere of his film Vollidiot

=== 2004 ===
- Golden Bravo Otto in the category "Comedy"

=== 2005 ===
- Golden Bravo Otto in the category "Comedy"
- Comet in the category "Beste Live-Comedy"
- Deutscher Comedypreis for "Beste Comedy-Show"
- Jetix Kids Award in the category "Coolster TV-Star"

=== 2006 ===
- Goldene Schallplatte for over 45.000 sold DVDs
- Golden Bravo Otto in the category "Comedy"
- Radio Regenbogen Comedy Award
- Goldene Schallplatte for more than 220.000 sold CDs of Schwarz und Weiß

=== 2008 ===
- Preis der beleidigten Zuschauer ("award of the offended viewers")
