= List of German-language comedians =

This is a list of notable German-language comedians.

- Alfons (born 1967)
- Enissa Amani (born 1981)
- Ingo Appelt (born 1967)
- Eddi Arent (1925-2013)
- Fips Asmussen (1938-2020)
- Django Asül (born 1972)
- Dirk Bach (1961-2012)
- Hugo Egon Balder (born 1950)
- Badesalz
- Mario Barth (born 1972)
- Frank-Markus Barwasser (born 1960)
- Rainer Basedow (1938-2022)
- Jürgen Becker (born 1959)
- Hennes Bender (born 1968)
- Ilka Bessin (born 1971)
- Bastian Bielendorfer (born 1984)
- Helene Bockhorst (born 1987)
- Mirja Boes (born 1971)
- Wigald Boning (born 1967)
- Sarah Bosetti (born 1984)
- Elmar Brandt (born 1971)
- Werner Brix (born 1964)
- Vicco von Bülow (1923-2011)
- Jochen Busse (born 1941)
- Rudi Carrell (1934-2006)
- Bülent Ceylan (born 1976)
- Özcan Coşar (born 1981)
- Eberhard Cohrs (1921-1999)
- Karl Dall (1941–2020)
- Klaus-Jürgen Deuser (born 1962)
- Olli Dittrich (born 1956)
- Alfred Dorfer (born 1961)
- Sammy Drechsel (1925-1985)
- Klaus-Jürgen Deuser (born 1962)
- Gerd Dudenhöffer (born 1949)
- Vince Ebert (born 1968)
- Lisa Eckhart (born 1992)
- Matthias Egersdörfer (born 1969)
- Christian Ehring (born 1972)
- Anke Engelke (born 1965)
- Elton (born 1971)
- Heinz Erhardt (1909-1979)
- Horst Evers (born 1967)
- Helga Feddersen (1930-1990)
- Herbert Feuerstein (1937-2020)
- Werner Finck (1902-1978)
- Ottfried Fischer (born 1953)
- Peter Frankenfeld (1913-1979)
- Annette Frier (born 1974)
- Tom Gerhardt (born 1957)
- Max Giermann (born 1975)
- Simon Gosejohann (born 1976)
- Sascha Grammel (born 1974)
- Monika Gruber (born 1971)
- Wolfgang Gruner (1926-2002)
- Josef Hader (born 1962)
- Helga Hahnemann (1937-1991)
- Dieter Hallervorden (born 1935)
- Evelyn Hamann (1942-2007)
- Edith Hancke (1928-2015)
- Michael Hatzius (born 1982)
- Klaus Havenstein (1922-1998)
- Michael "Bully" Herbig (born 1968)
- Christoph Maria Herbst (born 1966)
- Thomas Hermanns (born 1963)
- Rolf Herricht (1927-1981)
- Dieter Hildebrandt (1927-2013)
- Martina Hill (born 1974)
- Eckart von Hirschhausen (born 1967)
- Bernhard Hoëcker (born 1970)
- Rüdiger Hoffmann (born 1964)
- Sebastian Hotz (born 1996)
- Hanns Dieter Hüsch (1925-2005)
- Gerburg Jahnke (born 1955)
- Bruno Jonas (born 1952)
- Harald Juhnke (1929-2005)
- Oliver Kalkofe (born 1965)
- Rick Kavanian (born 1971)
- Carolin Kebekus (born 1980)
- Hape Kerkeling (born 1964)
- Michael Kessler (born 1967)
- Martin Klempnow (born 1973)
- Marc-Uwe Kling (born 1982)
- Dennie Klose (born 1979)
- Piet Klocke (born 1957)
- Matze Knop (born 1974)
- Herbert Köfer (1921-2021)
- Johann König (born 1972)
- Gaby Köster (born 1961)
- Diether Krebs (1947-2000)
- Markus Krebs (born 1970)
- Kurt Krömer (born 1974)
- Maren Kroymann (born 1949)
- Mike Krüger (born 1951)
- Sarah Kuttner (born 1979)
- Jürgen von der Lippe (born 1948)
- Ole Lehmann (born 1969)
- Felix Lobrecht (born 1988)
- Lore Lorentz (1920-1994)
- Loriot (1923-2011)
- Ingolf Lück (born 1958)
- Uwe Lyko (born 1954)
- Markus Majowski (born 1964)
- Jochen Malmsheimer (born 1961)
- Jürgen von Manger (1923-1994)
- Tobias Mann (born 1976)
- Matthias Matschke (born 1968)
- Tetje Mierendorf (born 1972)
- Rolf Miller (born 1967)
- Michael Mittermeier (born 1966)
- Luke Mockridge (born 1989)
- Ina Müller (born 1965)
- Wolfgang Müller (1923-1989)
- Petra Nadolny (born 1960)
- Wolfgang Neuss (1923-1989)
- Angelika Niedetzky (born 1979)
- Dieter Nuhr (born 1960)
- Hans Werner Olm (born 1955)
- Anne Onken (born 1977)
- Ingo Oschmann (born 1969)
- Robert Palfrader (born 1968)
- Bastian Pastewka (born 1972)
- Günter Pfitzmann (1924-2003)
- Volker Pispers (born 1958)
- Oliver Pocher (born 1978)
- Kalle Pohl (born 1951)
- Alf Poier (born 1967)
- Isabell Polak (born 1981)
- Gerhard Polt (born 1942)
- Hans-Joachim Preil (1923-1999)
- Urban Priol (born 1961)
- Markus Maria Profitlich (born 1960)
- Sebastian Pufpaff (born 1976)
- Stefan Raab (born 1966)
- Andreas Rebers (born 1958)
- Lukas Resetarits (born 1947)
- Hagen Rether (born 1969)
- Otto Reutter (1870-1931)
- Mathias Richling (born 1953)
- Beatrice Richter (born 1948)
- Judith Richter (born 1978)
- Larissa Rieß (born 1988)
- Marco Rima (born 1961)
- Hannes Ringlstetter (born 1970)
- Richard Rogler (1949–2024)
- Helmut Ruge (1940–2014)
- Gerd E. Schäfer (1923-2001)
- Christian Schiffer (born 1985)
- Mathias Schlung (born 1971)
- Wilfried Schmickler (born 1954)
- Harald Schmidt (born 1957)
- Ralf Schmitz (born 1974)
- Helge Schneider (born 1955)
- Martin Schneider (born 1964)
- Barbara Schöneberger (born 1974)
- Dagmar Schönleber (born 1973)
- Alexander Schubert (born 1970)
- Olaf Schubert (born 1967)
- Georg Schramm (born 1949)
- Atze Schröder (born 1965)
- Florian Schroeder (born 1979)
- Esther Schweins (born 1970)
- Paul Sedlmeir (born 1981)
- Nico Semsrott (born 1986)
- Christoph Sieber (born 1971)
- Hella von Sinnen (born 1959)
- Hans Söllner (born 1955)
- Serdar Somuncu (born 1968)
- Martin Sonneborn (born 1965)
- Ingrid Steeger (1947–2023)
- Axel Stein (born 1982)
- Emil Steinberger (born 1933)
- Bernd Stelter (born 1961)
- Holger Stockhaus (born 1973)
- Wolfgang Stumph (born 1946)
- Torsten Sträter (born 1966)
- Cordula Stratmann (born 1963)
- Carsten Strauch (born 1971)
- Tahnee (born 1992)
- Chris Tall (born 1991)
- Murat Topal (born 1976)
- Nora Tschirner (born 1981)
- Christian Tramitz (born 1955)
- Karl Valentin (1882-1948)
- Jan van Weyde (born 1979)
- Elisabeth Volkmann (1936-2006)
- Antonia von Romatowski (born 1976)
- Otto Waalkes (born 1948)
- Claus von Wagner (born 1977)
- Lilo Wanders (born 1955)
- Henning Wehn (born 1974)
- Oliver Welke (born 1966)
- Emily Wood (born 1978)
- Kaya Yanar (born 1973)
- AviYoruma (born ???)

== See also ==
- Cabaret
- German humour
- List of comedians
- List of German people
- List of Austrians
