= Steeler (German band) =

German heavy metal band

- Origin: Bochum, Germany
- Genres: Heavy metal
- Years active: 1981–1988
- Labels: Mausoleum, SPV GmbH
- Past members: Peter Burtz; Axel Rudi Pell; Tom Eder; Jan Yildiral; Roland Hag; Volker Krawczak
- Website: http://www.steeler.org

Steeler was a heavy metal band from the German city of Bochum formed in 1981. The band was active between 1981 and 1988. The founding members consisted of Peter Burtz on vocals, Axel Rudi Pell on guitar, Tom Eder also on guitar, Volker Krawczak on bass and Jan Yildiral on drums. The band was named after "Steeler", a song from Judas Priest album British Steel.

The band released two albums with this lineup, one a self-titled album, Steeler, and the other titled Rulin' the Earth. After the first two albums, Krawczak was replaced by Roland Hag; this new lineup released two more albums, Strike Back and Undercover Animal. After this the band split up.

Pell went on to start a successful solo career under his own name, with Krawczak on bass. His solo band is still performing and releasing songs to this day.

After the break-up of Steeler, vocalist Peter Burtz became the editor-in-chief of Metal Hammer Germany from 1989 to 1991 before taking on the role of head of A&R at EMI-Electrola in 1992. Between 1997 and 1999, Burtz was Managing Director of EMI Germany. He then went into producing radio comedy with parodist Elmar Brandt, earning the Deutsche Comedypreis (German Comedy Prize) in 1999 for their "Die Gerd-Show", named after then German Chancellor Gerhard Schröder. Burtz and Brandt landed various Top 20 hits spoofing the singing Chancellor, most notably 2002's "Steuersong" ("Tax Song"), which sold millions and topped the German Media Control Charts for 18 weeks. Burtz is now the manager of controversial German TV host and political satirist Jan Böhmermann.

== Past members ==
- Peter Burtz – lead vocals (1981–1988)
- Axel Rudi Pell – guitar (1981–1988)
- Tom Eder – guitar (1981–1988)
- Volker Krawczak – bass (1981–1985)
- Roland Hag – bass (1985–1988)
- Jan Yildiral – drums (1981–1988)

== Discography ==
- Steeler (1984)
- Rulin' the Earth (1985)
- Strike Back (1986)
- Undercover Animal (1988)
