= Ingo Oschmann =

German entertainer (born 1969)

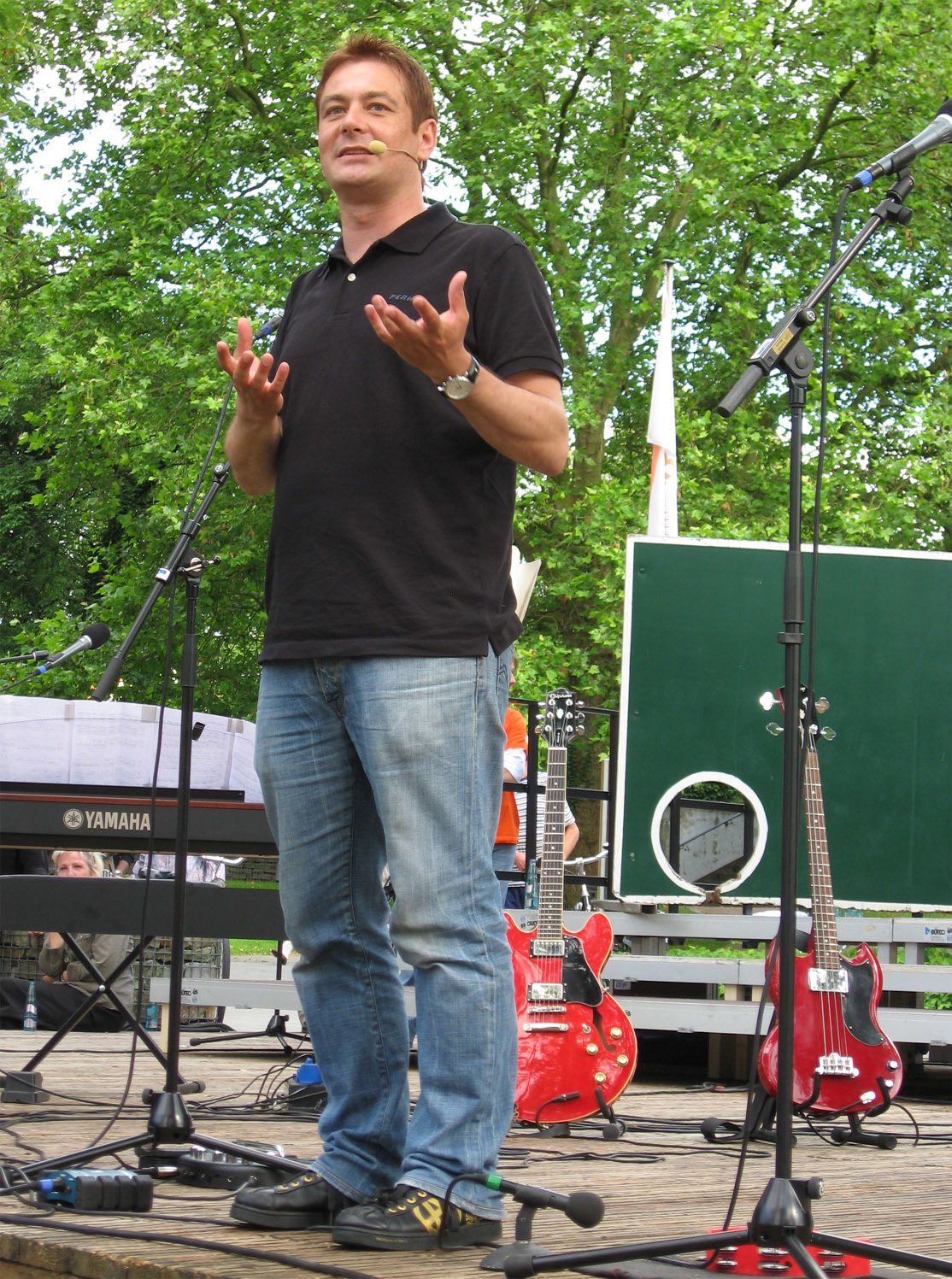
Ingo Oschmann.

Ingo Oschmann (born 3 August 1969 in Bielefeld) is a German comedian, entertainer and stage magician who also works as a television presenter and actor. In 2003, he became the first comedian to win the final of Star Search in Germany.

== Career ==
Ingo Oschmann first began practising magic in the year 1992 when he started performing at children's birthday parties, weddings, company anniversaries, and street festivals. In the year 1993 he attended several workshops like acting, pantomime, and improvisation. In the next couple of years he developed shows for kindergartens and schools in Bielefeld and surrounding areas. He also attended supplementary training seminars with the expectation of applying and furthering his skills in the fields of pantomime, clownery, and acting. Additionally, he had minor solo performances on the theatre stage.

In 1996 Oschmann created magic and acting seminars for children and adults. In 1997 he extended his professional repertoire with comedy, political cabaret and presentation. In the same year he won a casting in Munich and worked for the cabaret artists Klöpke & Schiefer (i.e. stage direction and texting).

In the year 2000 Oschmann presented his first full-length solo evening programme called "Kommunikaze". Furthermore, he developed, arranged and presented the variety show BELAMI. Oschmann celebrated his first major success on stage in the year 2001 by winning the Swiss Comedy Award. Thereafter he passed the Kölner Comedy Academy (Cologne Comedy Academy) and wrote his second solo evening programme "Oben ist es besser als unten!" (literally "It's better to be at the top than at the bottom!") In addition, he developed, planned and organized the Figaro Comedy Show, a comedy talent show which took place in a hairdresser's shop in Bielefeld once a month. Oschmann presented the show himself and invited e.g. comedians, cabaret artists, magicians and street artists to perform live on stage. The monthly show ran successfully until the end of 2006.

Winning the Swiss Comedy Award in 2001 was an important step in Oschmann's career. Afterwards he appeared in several shows on Swiss and German television. But the real breakthrough as a professional artist followed not until the year 2003 when Oschmann succeeded as a comedian in the first season of the famous TV show Star Search, broadcast by the German TV channel Sat.1. Oschmann's prize for winning the final of Star Search was his own TV comedy show called "Wenn Sie lachen, ist es Oschmann!" (literally "When you laugh, it's because of Oschmann!"). Sat.1 produced two seasons of the show in 2004.

In 2005, Oschmann became the host of another show on German TV: a clip and comedy show called "WWW - Die Witzigsten Werbespots der Welt" ("The funniest TV commercials in the world"), of which several seasons were produced between 2005 and 2007.

Since 2004, Oschmann has had numerous appearances as a stand-up comedian, magician and guest on all major German TV channels, e.g. performances and scenes with well-known artists like Dieter Hallervorden and Jürgen von der Lippe, as well as invitations for all the main comedy and evening shows of famous German TV presenters like Hugo Egon Balder, Thomas Hermanns and Anke Engelke - just to name a few.

In 2007, Oschmann's first DVD entitled Ingo Oschmann live with his third solo evening programme "Wenn Sie lachen, ist es Oschmann!" (recorded live on stage in 2005) was released. In addition, Oschmann published a cook book called "Schönen Abend!" ("Good evening!"), together with the popular entertainer and actor Jürgen von der Lippe.

In April 2008, Ingo Oschmann presented his solo evening programme "Wenn Sie lachen, ist es Oschmann!" (now "Laugh your Heart out") for the very first time in a non-European country. He performed two sold out full-length shows (in German) in the InterContinental Grand Stanford Hong Kong in Hong Kong. In September 2008, Oschmann will travel to Hong Kong again to present a comedy show in the InterContinental Grand Stanford Hotel.\ He is also to be seen live on stage at the Shanghai Hofbraeuhaus, China on 16 and 17 July 2010.

Ingo Oschmann founded a merchandising and publishing house called "Wunschkind", which published inter alia the CD "Kommando Zuversicht" by well-known German writer and singer Heinz Rudolf Kunze in 2006 and the live-CD "Egal gibt's nicht" of the popular German comedian Hennes Bender in 2008.

New projects include the publication of another book and a new live-tour through Germany with his fourth solo evening programme. The tour is going to start on 8 January 2009 in Hagen.

== Awards and nominations ==
- 2001 Winner Swiss Comedy Award
- 2003 Winner Star Search (on Sat.1)
- 2003 Bravo Otto Bronze
- 2004 Nomination Best Newcomer, Deutscher Comedy-Preis, (German Comedy Award, on RTL)

== CD ==
- 2007: audio book "Schönen Abend! – Geben Sie richtig Gast: Kochen, Spielen, Zaubern mit Freunden" (cooperation with Jürgen von der Lippe), published by Eichborn Verlag, ISBN 3-8218-5452-9

== DVDs ==
- 2006: Quatsch Comedy Club - Das Beste aus 10 Jahren, ASIN B000EHRY9E
- 2007: "Ingo Oschmann live", ASIN B000TX6G42

== Literature ==
- 2007: "Schönen Abend! – Geben Sie richtig Gast: Kochen, Spielen, Zaubern mit Freunden" (cooperation with Jürgen von der Lippe), published by Eichborn Verlag, ISBN 3-8218-6030-8

== See also ==
- List of German comedians
- German television comedy
