= Julia Stinshoff =

German actress

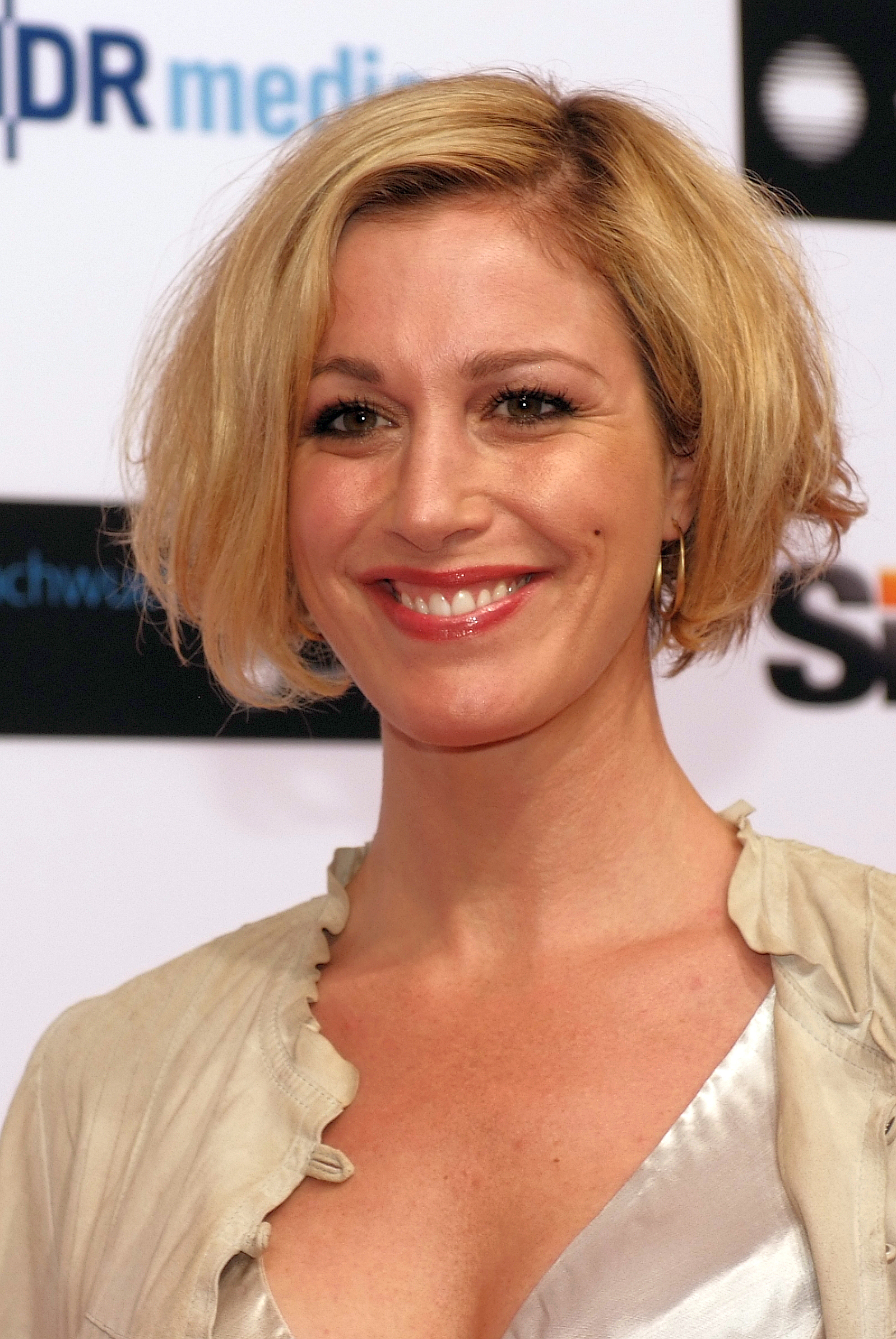
- Stinshoff in 2012
- Born: 27 December 1974 (age 51); Bonn, West Germany
- Occupations: Television actress Film actress
- Years active: 2000–present

Julia Stinshoff (born 27 December 1974 in Bonn) is a German actress.

== Career ==
Stinshoff started her English, philosophy and comparative religious studies but dropped out of college. From 1997 to 1999, she attended the Stage School of Hamburg as well as Johanna Brix's acting lessons. Then she studied psychology at the University of Bremen until she moved to Cologne for her first main acting role.

She started her acting career with her role of police chief Susanna von Landlitz in RTL's action series Alarm für Cobra 11 – Einsatz für Team 2 and her participation to the comedy series Ladykracher on SAT.1. She received several comedy awards for the latter role. Later she launched her own series Krista on RTL and played in numerous RTL event movies, including Crazy Race (for which she was nominated for the Deutscher Comedypreis for Best Actress) and Shark Attack in the Mediterranean. She also played roles in SAT.1 series, notably in LiebesLeben (nomination for Rose d'Or).

After a few singing and reading performances on stage with Roger Willemsen, she attracted a greater audience thanks to her television comedy roles, including Ein Date fürs Leben (ZDF) and Heiratsantrag mit Hindernissen (ARD). Moreover, she has been the main actress in ZDF's comedy series Dora Heldt (Urlaub mit Papa / Tante Inge haut ab) since 2009.

Besides, Stinshoff played in NDR children's programme Sesame Street and took the role of police chief Sophie Radetzki in ZDF's Monday evening thriller series Die Tote ohne Alibi.

== Filmography ==
- 2000: Dr. Stefan Frank – Der Arzt, dem die Frauen vertrauen – Verlust der Gefühle (TV series)
- 2001: Bronski & Bernstein (TV series, 9 episodes)
- 2002: Ein Albtraum von 3½ Kilo (TV film)
- 2002: Weihnachtsmann gesucht (TV film)
- 2002: Broti & Pacek – irgendwas ist immer – Südlich der Gürtelschnalle (TV series)
- 2002: Ladykracher (comedy series, 10 episodes)
- 2003: Krista (TV series, 6 episodes)
- 2003: Ohne Worte (TV series, episode 1x01)
- 2003: Crazy Race (TV film)
- 2003: Adelheid und ihre Mörder – Ende einer Karriere (TV series)
- 2003/2005: Alarm für Cobra 11 – Einsatz für Team 2 (TV series)
- 2004: Die Sandra Situation (short film)
- 2004: Liebe in der Warteschleife (TV film)
- 2004: Shark Attack in the Mediterranean (TV film)
- 2005–2007: LiebesLeben (TV series, 13 episodes)
- 2005: Die Patriarchin (TV series, 3 episodes)
- 2005: Nicht ohne meinen Schwiegervater (TV film)
- 2006: Good Girl, Bad Girl
- 2006: Die Märchenstunde: Rotkäppchen – Wege zum Glück (TV series)
- 2006: Die Rosenheim-Cops – In der Höhle des Mörders (TV series)
- 2006: Der Fürst und das Mädchen (TV series, 8 episodes)
- 2006: Nicht ohne meine Schwiegereltern (TV film)
- 2007: Vollidiot
- 2008: Forsthaus Falkenau – Gefangen auf Teneriffa (TV series)
- 2008: Lutter (TV series)
- 2008: A Date for Life (TV film)
- 2009: Ladykracher
- 2009: Dora Heldt: Urlaub mit Papa (TV film)
- 2010: Inga Lindström – Mein falscher Verlobter
- 2010: Stuttgart Homicide – Türen der Stadt (TV series)
- 2010–2011: Danni Lowinski (TV series, 5 episodes)
- 2010–2012: Vier Frauen und ein Todesfall (TV series, 7 episodes)
- 2011: Tante Inge haut ab (TV film)
- 2011: The Gold Quest: A Journey to Panama (TV film)
- 2011: Lilly Schönauer – Liebe mit Hindernissen (TV series)
- 2012: Die Tote ohne Alibi (TV film)
- 2013: Dora Heldt: Ausgeliebt (TV film)
- 2014: Dora Heldt: Unzertrennlich (TV film)
- 2016: Krauses Glück (TV film)
- 2016–2017: Dr. Klein (TV series, 5 episodes)
- 2017: Um Himmels Willen – Altes Geheimnis (TV series)
- 2018: Großstadtrevier – Blutrache (TV series)
- 2018: Bettys Diagnose – Weiße Mäuse (TV series)
