= German television comedy =

Overview of television comedy in Germany

Germany has a long tradition of television comedy stretching as far back as the 1950s, and with its origins in cabaret and radio.

== 1960s ==
- 1963: Der 90. Geburtstag (Dinner for One) is a comedy sketch recorded on 8 July 1963 at Theater am Besenbinderhof in front of a real audience by Norddeutscher Rundfunk (NDR). Although it is actually performed in English, it is considered a cult television classic in Germany and it is still an integral component of the New Year's Eve schedule at several German television stations.

== 1970s ==
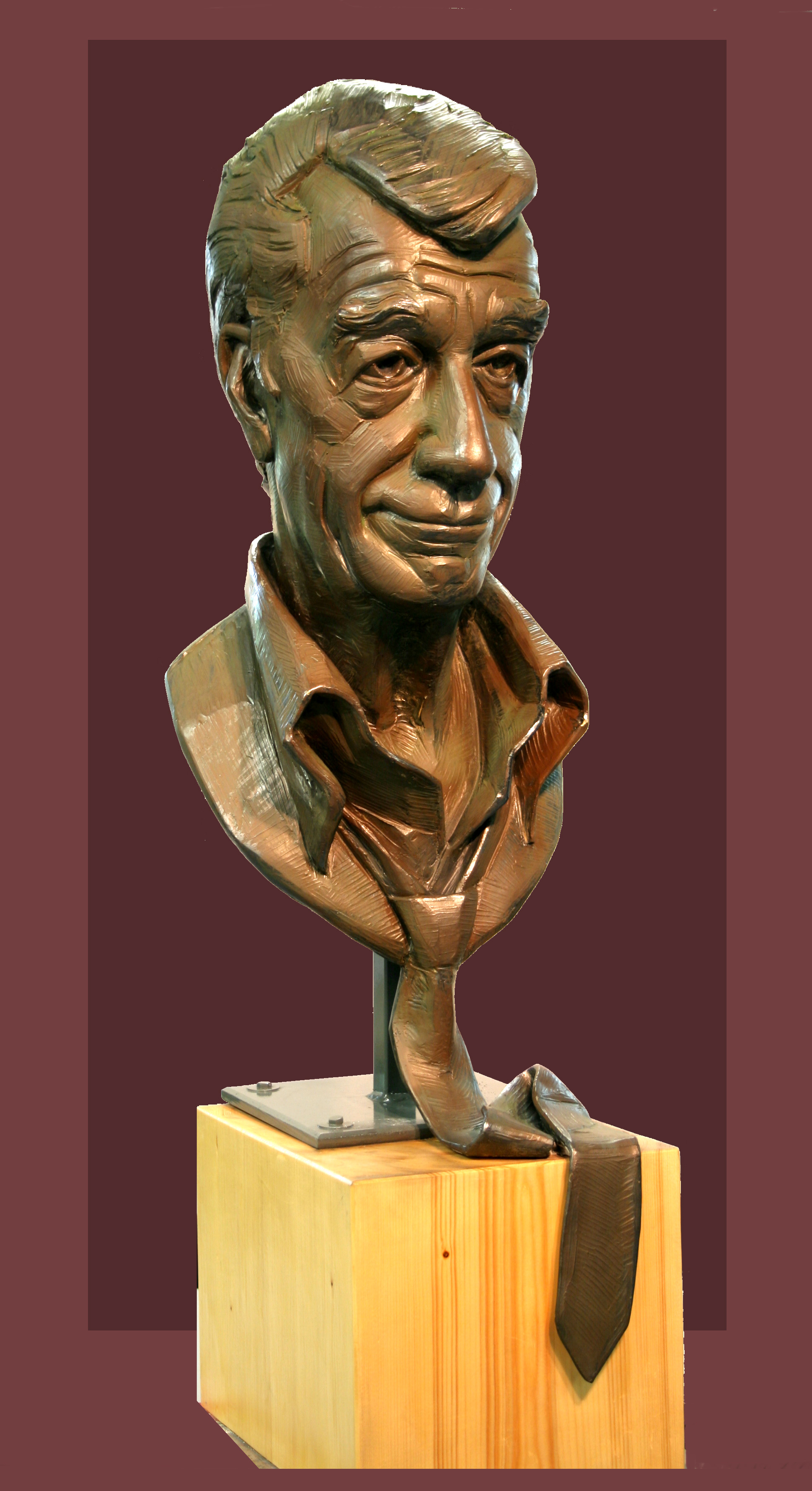
Bust of Rudi Carrell

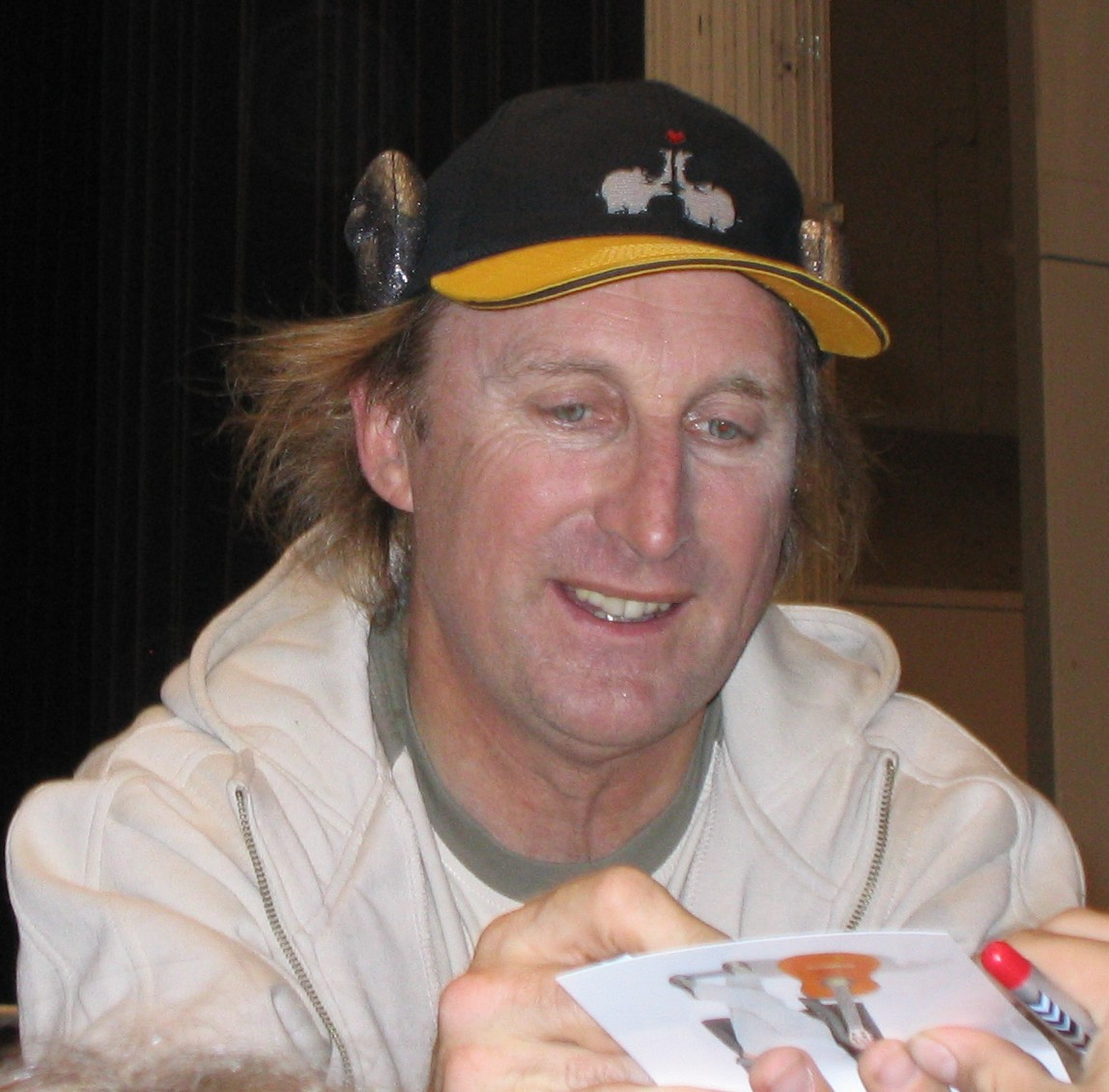
Otto Waalkes

When Otto's first show came out in 1973, it differed in many ways from those of traditional comedians also around at the time, such as Rudi Carrell (then aged 39) and Loriot (then 50). Rudi Carrell and Loriot dressed rather more formally in a suit and tie, and stood on a large stage with the audience seated in rows, whereas Otto, then only 25, with his long blond hair falling in his face, wore T-shirts and jeans, and sat on a smaller cabaret-style stage, closer to the audience. This generation gap was reflected in Ein Herz und eine Seele, a sitcom similar to Till Death Us Do Part, where the old-fashioned character Alfred Tetzlaff clashes comically with his daughter Rita and his son-in-law Michael, who stands for the German student movement of 1968. The more traditional shows remained extremely popular, however, and repeats are still regularly shown today. The older comedians also adapted; Rudi Carrell continued to appear in comedy shows until shortly before his death in 2006.

- 1965 – 1973: Rudi Carrell Show slapstick series starring Rudi Carrell, on ARD
- 1967 – 1972: Cartoon sketch show starring Loriot, on ARD
- 1970: Telematch outdoor game show between two German towns where the competitors would be in fancy dress and engage in funny competitive games: similar to It's a Knockout or Jeux Sans Frontières.
- 1971 – 1972: Monty Python's Fliegender Zirkus – a special recording, in German, of Monty Python's Flying Circus
- 1973 – 1976: Ein Herz und eine Seele, sitcom starring Heinz Schubert, Diether Krebs etc.
- 1973 – 1979: Klimbim, sketch comedy program starring Ingrid Steeger, Elisabeth Volkmann etc.
- 1973 – 1979: Die Otto-Show, slightly surrealist live stand-up/music/sketch show starring Otto, on ARD
- 1975 – 1980: Nonstop Nonsens, comedy series starring Dieter Hallervorden on ARD
- 1976 – 1979: Loriot, sketch show starring Loriot, often with Evelyn Hamann, on ARD

== 1980s ==
In the 1980s, as elsewhere, the pre-recorded sketch show came into its own in Germany: Sketchup, So Isses, Harald und Eddi. Like Britain's Not the Nine O'Clock News (1979–82), one such show, Rudis Tagesshow, although not exactly alternative comedy, also poked fun at the main news programme (Tagesschau) and involved political satire. This caused trouble in 1987 when Carrell cut together footage of Ayatollah Khomeni with shots of veiled women throwing their knickers. The outraged Iranian government responded by expelling two German diplomats and closing the Goethe Institute in Tehran.

Technological advances also meant that cameras were used away from the studios more and more; the Candid Camera-style show Verstehen Sie Spaß appeared, which is still running, in the original format, today. Unlike other countries' versions of Candid Camera, it remains very popular, with seven million viewers on a Saturday evening; almost 25% of the market. It has been going strong since 1980.

- since 1980: Verstehen Sie Spaß?, the German equivalent of Candid Camera, most recently presented by Guido Cantz, runs on ARD
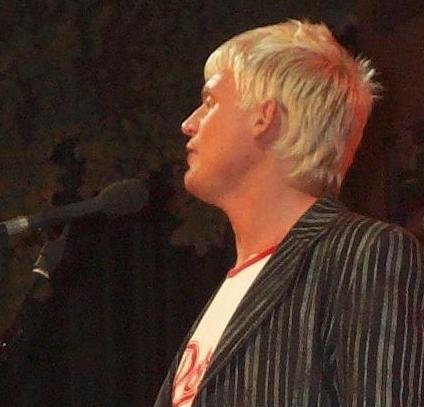
  Guido Cantz, host of Verstehen Sie Spaß?
- 1980 – 1990: WWF Club, show with sketches, interviews, off-the-cuff humour, presented by Jürgen von der Lippe on ARD
- 1981: So ein Otto and Ein neues Programm mit Otto Waalkes, starring Otto, on WDR; much repeated.
- 1981 – 1987: Rudis Tagesshow starring Rudi Carrell, Diether Krebs and Klaus Havenstein, on ARD
- 1984 – 1989: So Isses, series with Jürgen von der Lippe on ARD
- 1983 – 1986: Sketchup comedy sketch series with Diether Krebs, Beatrice Richter/Iris Berben, on ARD
- 1987 – 1990: Harald und Eddi, comedy series starring Harald Juhnke and Eddi Arent, on ARD
- 1988 – 1992: Alles nichts oder?!, slapstick game show hosted by Hella von Sinnen and Hugo Egon Balder, on RTL

== 1990s ==
The 1990s saw female comedians appearing in more prominent roles; whereas actresses such as Evelyn Hamann in the '70s or Iris Berben in the '80s usually played a main character's wife or girlfriend, now women such as Esther Schweins, Tanja Schumann, Anke Engelke and Hella von Sinnen made a name for themselves in more independent roles, although still mostly as part of larger casts.

With television becoming more and more international, there was a lot of influence from abroad in many shows of the '90s: RTL Samstag Nacht was based on Saturday Night Live (USA), the Harald Schmidt Show was similar to the Late Show with David Letterman (USA), 7 Tage, 7 Köpfe was superficially based on Have I Got News For You? (GB).

- 1990 – 1994: Schmidteinander, a satirical comedy show, presented by Harald Schmidt and Herbert Feuerstein on WDR and ARD
- since 1992: Quatsch Comedy Club presented by Thomas Hermanns on Pro Sieben
- 1992 – 1994: Lippes Lachmix show starring Jürgen von der Lippe on WDR
- 1993 – 1998: RTL Samstag Nacht, live comedy show based on Saturday Night Live, starring Wigald Boning, Olli Dittrich, Esther Schweins, Stefan Jürgens, Tanja Schumann and Mirco Nontschew, on RTL
- 1995 – 2003: Harald Schmidt Show, a late night television show, originally similar to the Late Show with David Letterman, presented by Harald Schmidt on Sat. 1
- 1996 – 1997: Happiness, sketch show with Markus Maria Profitlich on Sat.1

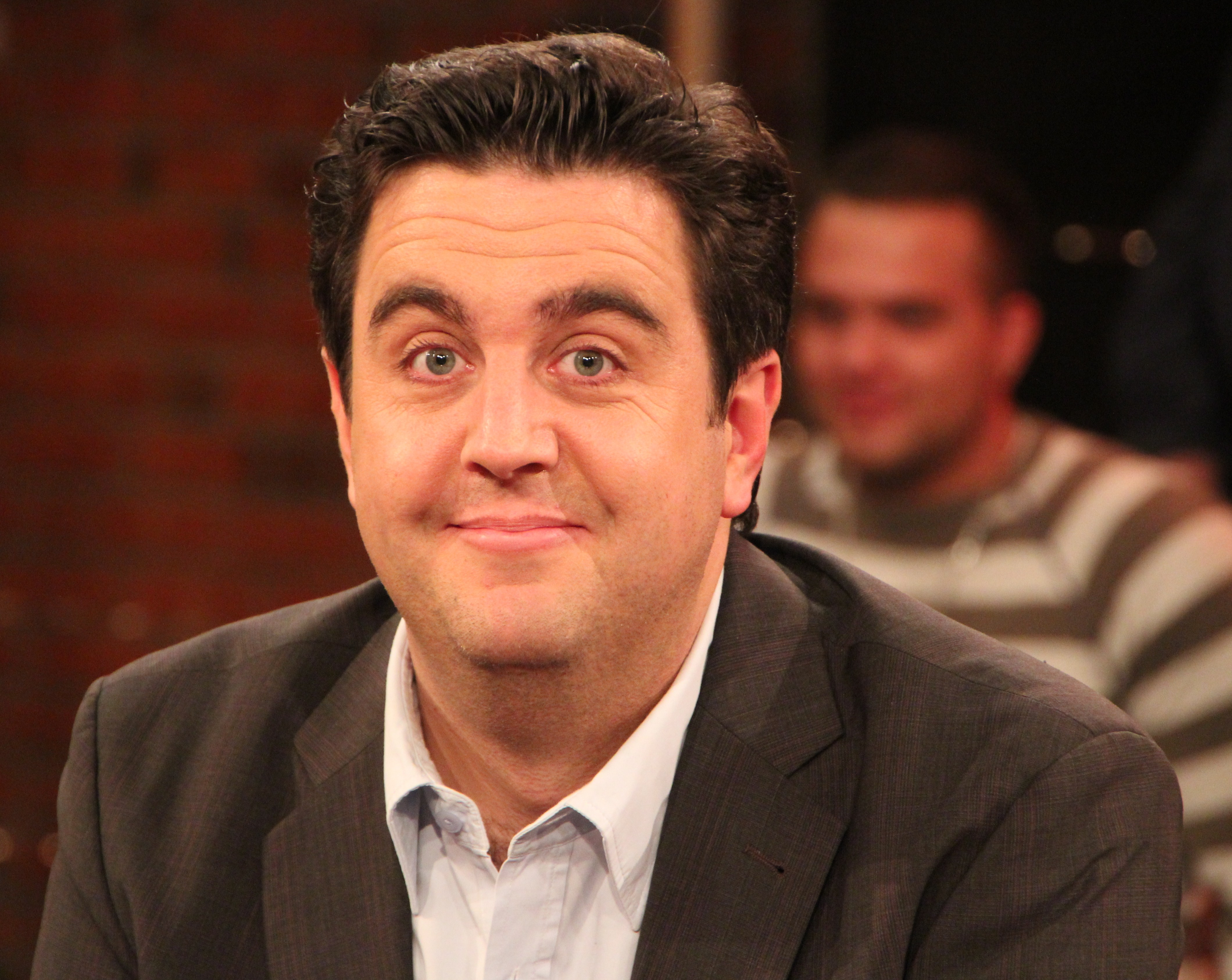
Bastian Pastewka

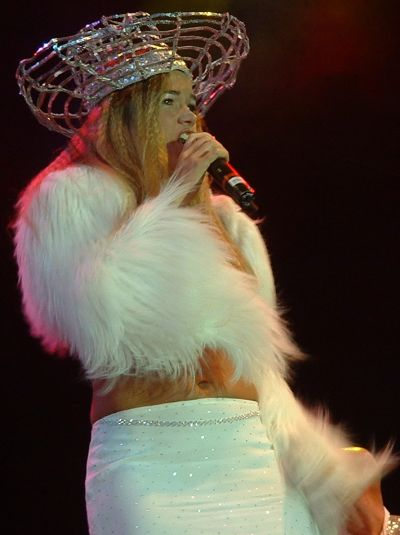
Anke Engelke

- 1996 – 2002: Die Wochenshow, sketch show starring Anke Engelke, Bastian Pastewka and Ingolf Lück, on Sat.1
- 1996 – 2005: 7 Tage, 7 Köpfe, comedy news show similar to Have I Got News For You? except that pre-planned gags were not only confined to the host Jochen Busse; most famous team captains Mike Krüger and Rudi Carrell, on RTL
- since 1996: WWW – Die witzigsten Werbespots der Welt, clip and comedy show presented first by Fritz Egner and since 2005 by Ingo Oschmann, on Sat.1; Ingo won the 2003 final of Star Search in Germany as best comedy performer.
- 1997–2000: Switch, a TV parody with Michael Müller, Peter Nottmeier and others, on Pro Sieben
- 1997 – 2002: Bullyparade, a mixture of live and pre-filmed comedy sketches, starring Michael Herbig as "Bully", on Pro Sieben
- 1999–2015: TV total, late night television comedy talk show, created, produced and hosted by Stefan Raab, on Pro Sieben

== Since 2000 ==
By the first decade of the new millennium, the trend began to move back away from the pre-recorded sketch shows of the '80s and '90s. Comedy talk shows such as TV Total and Elton.tv naturally involved more off-the-cuff humour, and soon these were joined by improvised shows such as Genial daneben and the original Schillerstraße. The main role in the latter is played by an actress, Cordula Stratmann; by now there were several shows whose main stars were female comedians, such as Ladykracher with Anke Engelke. Slapstick now played a less important role: instead, realism was in, with shows removing the laugh track, such as Stromberg (similar to The Office) or the sitcom Pastewka.

- since 2000: Night Wash: live stand-up comedy show for upcoming new comedians, filmed in a real laundrette, ran on WDR and ARD until 2007; since then on Comedy Central Germany (which started broadcasting in 2007).
- 2000 – 2006: Alles Atze, comedy sitcom starring Atze Schröder, on RTL
- 2001 – 2003: Elton.tv, late night television comedy talk show hosted by Elton, on Pro Sieben
- 2001 – 2005: Was guckst du?!, sketch show starring Kaya Yanar, on Sat.1
- since 2002: Die Dreisten Drei, short sketches with Mirja Boes and others, runs on Sat.1
- 2002 – 2004, again since 2008: Ladykracher, comedy sketch series starring Anke Engelke, on Sat. 1; Anke won a Rose d'Or as best comedy performer in the series
- since 2002: Comedystreet, based on Trigger Happy TV and starring Simon Gosejohann, on Pro Sieben
- 2002 – 2009: Sechserpack, comedy sketch show with six actors including the British-German Emily Wood, on Sat.1
- 2003 – 2011: Genial daneben – Die Comedy Arena presented by Hugo Egon Balder on Sat. 1 (one of first improvised shows, set off a series of other improvisation-based shows)
- 2003 – 2006: Rent a Pocher, show starring Oliver Pocher, on Pro Sieben
- 2004 – 2007; 2009 – 2011: Schillerstraße improvised comedy soap opera; main actress was Cordula Stratmann, later Jürgen Vogel, runs on Sat.1. German concept, taken up by Fox TV and sold in many other countries; won Rose d'Or Press Prize (most innovative programme).
- 2004 – 2012: Stromberg, mockumentary comedy series partly based on The Office, starring Christoph Maria Herbst on Pro Sieben
- 2005 – 2008: Frei Schnauze (improvisational comedy show adapted from Whose Line Is It Anyway?), presented by Mike Krüger then Dirk Bach on RTL
- since 2005: Pastewka, sitcom starring Bastian Pastewka, partly based on Curb Your Enthusiasm, but scripted, on Sat.1; Pastewka won a Rose d'Or for his performance in the sitcom.
- 2006 – 2009: Türkisch für Anfänger ('Turkish for Beginners'), comedy-drama series dealing with transcultural issues (see Turks in Germany), on ARD; won the German Television Award (Best Show of 2006) and an Adolf Grimme Award (Best Entertainment Show of 2007) and was nominated for a Rose d'Or twice (2006 and 2007).
- 2006 – 2009: Die ProSieben Märchenstunde ('ProSieben Fairy Tale Hour') comedy series featuring a changing cast of German and Austrian comedians and satirising fairy tale classics
- since 2007: Switch reloaded, the sequel of Switch with partially same staff, on Pro Sieben.
- since 2009: heute-show a late-night satirical television program airing on public broadcasting channel ZDF; a conceptual adaptation of The Daily Show with Jon Stewart; being presented by comedian and journalist Oliver Welke
- 2010 – 2014: Danni Lowinski a legal dramedy featuring Annette Frier as the eponymous character
- since 2010: Der letzte Bulle ('The last cop') a comedy-drama series centered about a cop, portrayed by Henning Baum, from the 1980s put into a modern police department in Essen
- 2011 - 2015: Knallerfrauen a slapstick sketch show starring Martina Hill on Sat. 1
- since 2011: Der Tatortreiniger ('Crime Scene Cleaner'), chamber-play comedy featuring Bjarne Mädel, with only one or two other actors, who change each episode, on NDR Fernsehen; it is also broadcast in France and the USA
- since 2012: Nicht nachmachen! ('Don't Do This!'), a comedy-documentary television series that airs on ZDF and ZDFneo presented by Wigald Boning and Bernhard Hoëcker defying the warnings and restrictions on various items to see what happens when they do

== Sources ==
Much of this article is taken from information on the German language Wikipedia (articles on comedians and comedy programmes).

== See also ==
- German humour
- List of German language comedians
