= Asmussen =

Asmussen is a Danish patronymic surname. People with the name include:

- Cash Asmussen (born 1962), American jockey
- Don Asmussen (born 1962), American cartoonist
- Erik Asmussen (1913–1998), Danish architect
- Fips Asmussen (1938–2020), stage name of German comedian and entertainer Rainer Pries
- Gunnar Asmussen (born 1944), Danish retired cyclist
- Hans Asmussen (1898–1968), German theologian
- Jes Peter Asmussen (1928–2002), Danish Iranologist
- Jörg Asmussen (born 1966), German economist and politician
- Kristian Asmussen (born 1971), Danish handballer
- Nicholas Asmussen (1871–1941), Canadian entrepreneur and politician
- Roger Asmussen (1936–2015), German politician
- Steve Asmussen (born 1965), American horse trainer
- Stig Asmussen, American video game developer
- Svend Asmussen (1916–2017), Danish violinist
- Tom Asmussen (1878–1963), American baseball player
