= Margarethe Schreinemakers =

German television presenter

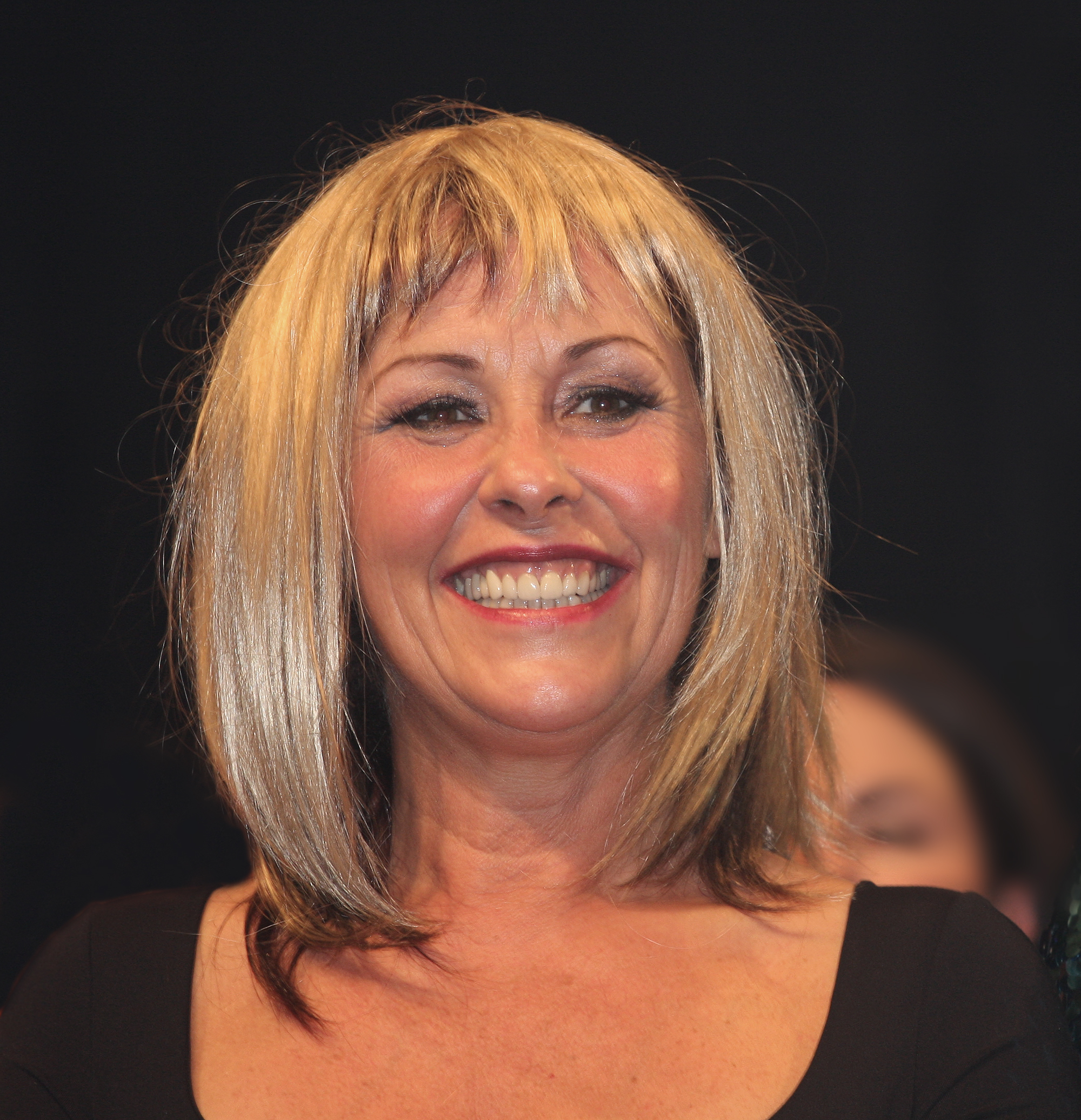
- Schreinemakers in 2009
- Born: 27 July 1958 (age 68); Krefeld, West Germany
- Education: University of Bonn
- Occupations: Television presenter, talk show host, journalist
- Awards: Bambi Award; 1992 Schreinemakers live Goldene Kamera; 1992 Schreinemakers live

Margarethe Schreinemakers (born 27 July 1958) is a German television presenter, talk show host and journalist.

== Life ==
Schreinemakers was born in Krefeld and studied sociology at the University of Bonn. She works as television presenter and journalist in Germany. She presented on German broadcaster WDR Aktuelle Stunde and Extratour. From 1988 to 1991 she was talk show host for NDR Talk Show. From 1992 to 1997 she presented "Schreinemakers live" on German broadcasters Sat.1 and RTL. Several other talk shows followed during the next years. Schreinemakers has two children. From 1986 to 1988 she lived together with German television presenter Jürgen von der Lippe. In March 2009 Schreinemakers had a heart attack. In 2011, she lived together with Jean Marie Maus.

== 1996 Tax Dispute and Broadcast Termination ==
=== Background and Network Tensions ===
By the mid-1990s, the weekly show Schreinemakers Live, which at that time was aired on the private German television channel Sat.1, had become one of the country's most watched and commercially successful programs. Known for its emotive style and mix of human interest and taboo subjects, the show secured Schreinemakers extensive editorial authority and high compensation (around 110,000 Deutsche Mark per episode).

In October 1993, Schreinemakers conducted a high-profile interview with Karin Waigel, the former wife of Federal Minister of Finance Theo Waigel, amidst their public divorce.

Tensions grew in 1995 when Fred Kogel became head of programming at Sat.1. Kogel sought to revamp the station's schedule, particularly to make room for Harald Schmidt's daily late-night show at 11:00 p.m., which clashed with Schreinemakers Live's extensive Thursday evening slot. Resisting schedule changes, Schreinemakers signed a future contract with competitor RTL beginning in January 1997, leaving her on Sat.1 for another 18 months under strained management relations.

=== Tax Investigations ===
During Schreinemakers' maternity leave in early 1996, with sports anchor Jörg Wontorra temporarily hosting her show, she became subject of widespread media scrutiny and an investigation by German tax authorities.

Although the press heavily focused on her official residency in Belgium, the core dispute centered around the show's corporate financing:

- Sat.1 paid approximately 1 million Deutsche Mark per episode to Netherlands-based company Living Camera.
- Living Camera subcontracted the German company Telemaus GmbH, owned by Schreinemakers' husband and lawyer, to physically produce the show in Cologne, Germany.
- Under double taxation agreements, German authorities withheld a 25% withholding tax (Quellensteuer). Tax auditors refused to refund roughly 25 million Deutsche Mark, suspecting that Living Camera operated as a letterbox company primarily for tax mitigation.

Schreinemakers publicly denied wrongdoing, alleging that the tax investigation was a politically motivated retaliation orchestrated by Theo Waigel due to her 1993 interview with his ex-wife. Waigel and the Ministry of Finance denied any personal interference.

=== Broadcast Termination of August 22, 1996 ===
Upon returning to the show on August 22, 1996, Schreinemakers announced her plan to use the live broadcast to defend herself against the tax allegations and media coverage.

==== Management Directive and Escalation ====
Sat.1 CEO Fred Kogel demanded a written commitment that Schreinemakers would not discuss her private legal matters on air, asserting the channel's program sovereignty. Schreinemakers rejected this, pointing to her contractual editorial autonomy.

Her husband and lawyer responded by issuing his own deadline. He demanded that Sat.1 provide an assurance "never again to interfere with the editorial autonomy of Schreinemakers Live." Otherweise, they reserved the right to an extraordinary termination of the existing contract.

A channel spokesperson confirmed that Sat.1 would resist the move 'by all means' and ultimately threatened to cut the live feed if Schreinemakers attempted to air the segment addressing her personal tax affairs.

==== Failed Negotiations ====
On the afternoon of the broadcast, Sat.1 co-managing director Jürgen Doetz traveled to Cologne to dissuade Schreinemakers from airing the prepared 10-minute video segment. A compromise proposed by her team was rejected by channel executives.

==== Live Broadcast Termination ====
The live show began at 9:00 p.m. with an opening statement from Schreinemakers addressing the ongoing controversy: "You see, I am back. Behind me lie five months of leave, a wonderful birth, a great baby. But unfortunately, also an enourmous amound of crap that has been written about me. And I believe you have a right to the truth."

Rather than addressing the topic immediately at the beginning, Schreinemakers announced that, for legal reasons, she could only present her position at the end of the show, evidently to avoid potential damage claims over lost advertising revenue: "Whether you will actually see the report then is no longer in my hands." The program proceeded through its scheduled human-interest segments over the next nearly three hours.

At approximately 11:45 p.m., with an estimated audience of 4.5 million viewers remaining, Schreinemakers prepared to transition to the unapproved segment: "Now the moment has arrived that many of you have certainly been waiting for. And I, that I can guarantee, even much more." She gave the cue to roll the prepared report detailing the corporate structure and defending her financial conduct.

Approximately three seconds into the report, technical directors in the channel's master control room executed the planned intervention and faded out the video and audio feed from the show in Cologne. Viewers nationwide were shown a static emergency text card that read "Due to current circumstances, Sat.1 must change its programming schedule today. Please stay tuned. A situation report live from Berlin follows." The channel immediately switched to a special edition of the channel's news program, Sat.1 Nachrichten, anchored by Ulrich Meyer. Meyer confirmed that the channel had deliberately terminated the live broadcast and read an official statement from management explaining that private financial affairs had no place in journalistic television programming.

=== Aftermath and significance ===
The abrupt termination of Schreinemakers Live on live television is regarded as one of the most prominent incidents in post-war German television history. While it demonstrated the limits of editorial independence versus channel authority, the surrounding media backlash and tax investigation substantially harmed Schreinemakers' public standing before her eventual move to RTL in 1997, after fulfilling her expiring contract with Sat.1.

At RTL, Schreinemakers failed to replicate the massive ratings and cultural impact of Schreinemakers Live with her new show, that was named Schreinemakers TV for the channel. The tax dispute in 1996 had severely affected Schreinemakers' public image. The perception of financial maneuvering conflicted with her role as an advocate for the ordinary people and emotional causes. Viewership declined steadily through the year of 1997, falling well short of RTL's internal benchmarks and commercial expectations.

When a format revision also failed to bring about the hoped-for turnaround, RTL CEO Helmut Thoma decided to discontinue the program, initially planned for three years, early after just one year with the final episode of Schreinemakers TV aired on December 18, 1997. The channel had to compensate for the cancellation of 26 agreed episodes with a payment of 18 million Deutsche Mark. The cancellation marked the definitive end of Margarethe Schreinemakers' era as the dominant prime-time talk show host on German commercial television.

== Awards ==
- Bambi for Schreinemakers live
- Goldene Kamera for Schreinemakers live
