= Onken =

Onken may refer to:

- 12868 Onken, a main-belt asteroid
- Anne Onken (born 1977), German radio presenter and comedian
- Onken GmbH, German dairy company founded by Hermann Onken, now part of Emmi AG

== See also ==
- Oncken (disambiguation)
