= U-900 =

- Theatrical release poster
- Directed by: Sven Unterwaldt
- Written by: Michael Gantenberg; Oliver Ziegenbalg
- Produced by: Max Wiedemann; Quirin Berg
- Starring: Atze Schröder; Yvonne Catterfeld; Oliver K. Wnuk
- Cinematography: Stephan Schuh
- Edited by: Stefan Essl
- Music by: Karim Sebastian Elias
- Production company: Wiedemann & Berg Filmproduktion
- Distributed by: Warner Bros. Pictures
- Release date: 9 October 2008
- Running time: 98 minutes
- Country: Germany
- Language: German
- Box office: $1.8 million

U-900 is a 2008 German comedy film directed by Sven Unterwaldt. The film is a parody of the 1981 film Das Boot.

The film was released on 9 October 2008 by Warner Bros. Pictures.

== Cast ==
- Atze Schröder as Himself
- Yvonne Catterfeld as Maria
- Oliver K. Wnuk as Samuel
- Jürgen Schornagel as General Strasser
- Christian Kahrmann as Leutnant Block
- Götz Otto as Oberleutnant von Stetten
