= Gerburg Jahnke =

German comedian

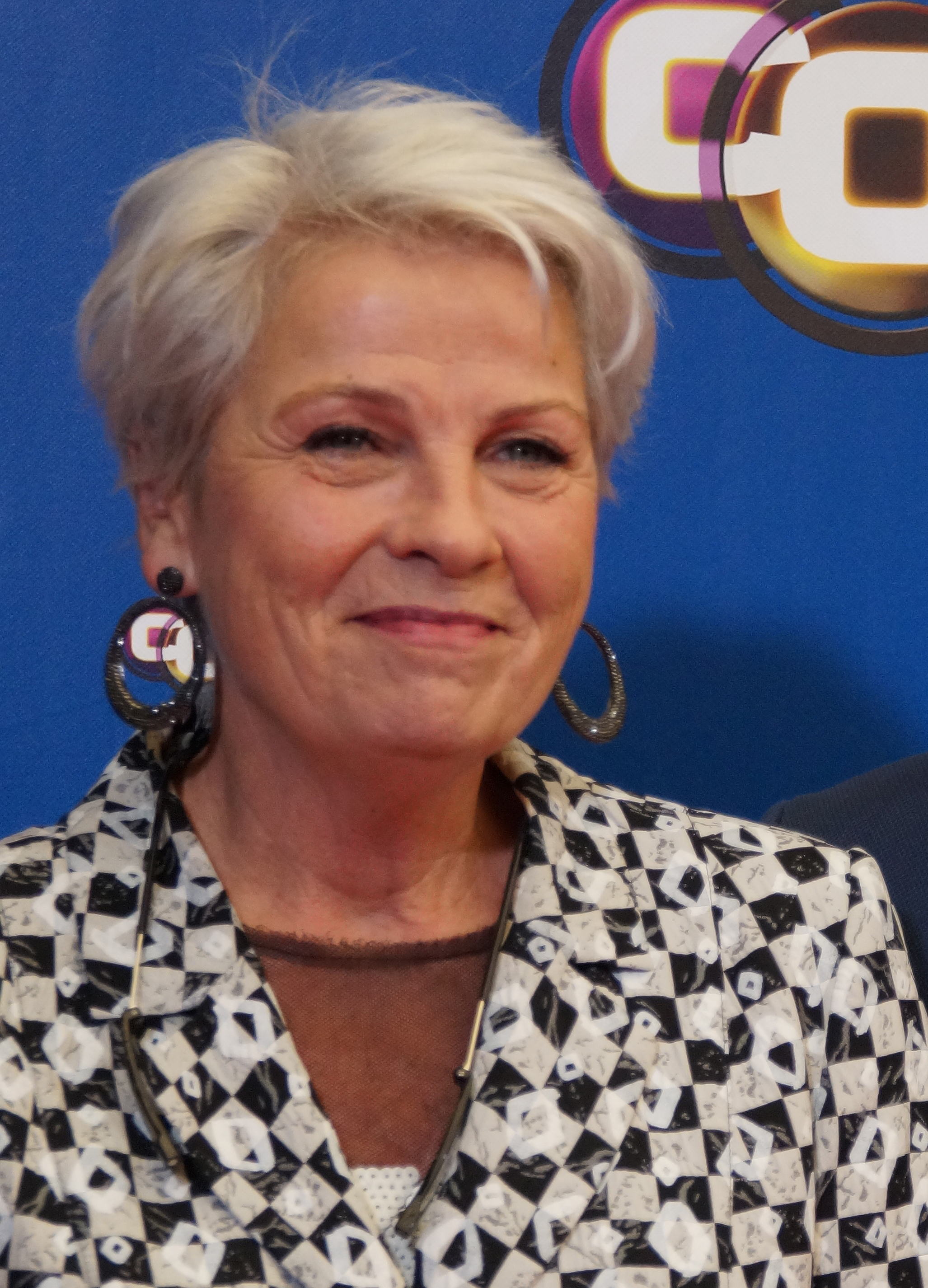
Gerburg Jahnke (2016)

Gerburg Jahnke (born 18 January 1955, in Oberhausen-Osterfeld) is a German comedian.

== Life ==
After school in Oberhausen Jahnke studied arts and German studies in Münster and Düsseldorf. Jahnke is best known in Germany for her work as a comedian. Together with Stephanie Überall she had a comedy group Missfits.

== See also ==
- German television comedy
- List of German comedians
