= Lisa Eckhart =

Austrian poetry slammer and cabaret artist

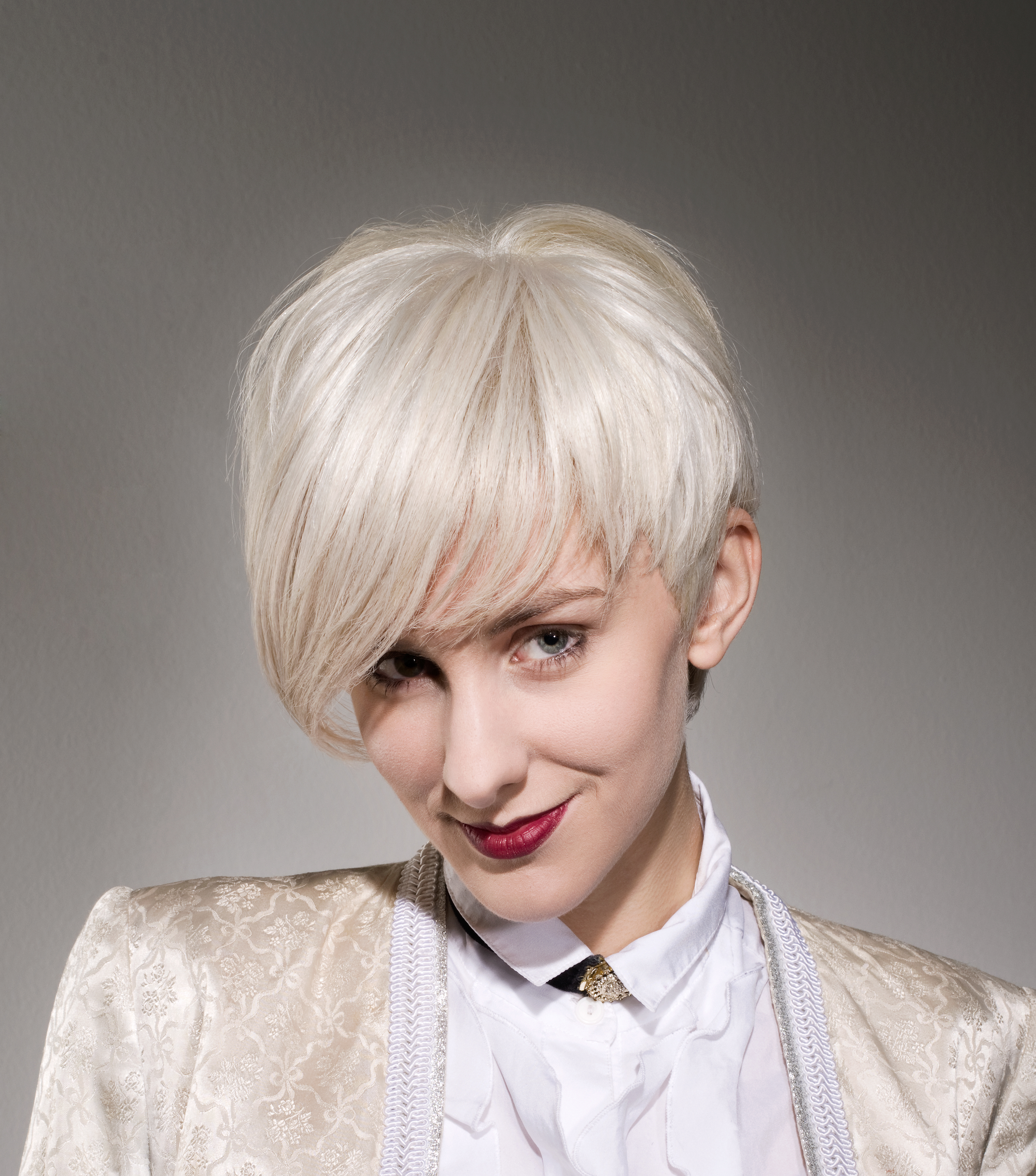
- Eckhart in 2015
- Born: Lisa Lasselsberger; 6 September 1992 (age 34); Leoben, Austria
- Occupations: Slam poet, Cabaret artist, Entertainer, Comedian
- Website: lisaeckhart.com

Lisa Eckhart (born 6 September 1992) is an Austrian poetry slammer, comedian, and cabaret artist.

== Life ==
Born in Leoben, Styria, Eckhart grew up near Leoben with her grandparents. After graduating from the HIB Liebenau in Graz in 2009, she studied German and Slavic Studies at the Paris Sorbonne. After a one-year stay in London, she moved to Berlin. She completed her master studies at the Free University of Berlin. The first master's thesis on femininity and National Socialism based on Joseph Goebbels's diaries was rejected, and her second master's thesis dealt with the figure of the devil in German literature. After graduating, she completed over twenty unsuccessful auditions at drama schools, often reciting Mephistopheles, and finally discovered poetry slam. In October 2015, she won the Austrian Poetry Slam Championships as the second woman. At the German Poetry Slam Championship 2015 in Augsburg competed with the later winner Jan Philipp Zymny.

In November 2015, she staged her cabaret solo debut at the Vienna Theater am Alsergrund. In 2015, she was one of five finalists on the Golden Miniature Nail. For her solo program, she was awarded the prize of the Austrian Cabaret Award.

In 2016 she was in Vereinsheim Schwabing in Bayerischer Rundfunk and as part of the advice team of What's new? (Was gibts Neues?) as well as at STÖCKL. on ORF in 2017, she was a guest at Pufpaff's happy hour, at nuhr ab 18 by Dieter Nuhr, on WDR in Mitternachtsspitzen and presented by Gerburg Jahnke and on ORF hosted by Hosea Ratschiller de Prater Stars.

On 10 January 2018, Eckhart started her second solo program with The Benefits of Vice (Die Vorteile des Lasters) (premiere in the Cabaret Niedermair). She calls herself "an angry, screaming Austrian rejected by art schools and loved by Germans who will never learn" and likes to wear eccentric outfits.

Upon being invited by the curators Daniela Strigl and Klaus Kastberger to the literature festival O-Tones (O-Töne) in 2020 she read sections from her own novel Omama. The book, offering "one-word sentences as milieu studies" to a federal state of the Republic Austria called Styria, made bestseller lists in both Germany and Austria.

She had a baby in 2021.

She went on tour presenting her solo program BOUM in 2022 and Empress Stasi the First (Kaiserin Stasi die Erste) in 2023. Empress Stasi the First premiered on the German Unity Day, 3rd October 2023, in a venue in Leipzig called Haus Leipzig.

She stated herself to be working without gag authors.

Her novel Boum, published in 2022, received mixed responses from critics. Rainer Moritz named the rhetorical figure of the zeugma as characteristic for the book’s linguistic exuberance and punchline richness in DLF Kultur, a culture-oriented radio station part of a three national radio station set of Germany called Deutschlandradio.

== Reception ==
2020, Eckhart was accused of antisemitism for her political-satire contribution to Mitternachtspitzen in 2018, a broadcast of the German public-broadcasting institution WDR. In her satirical contribution The holy cow has BSE (Die Heilige Kuh hat BSE) she used sarcastic character speech to ask the question “What to do, when the untouchables start touching others”: meaning when Jews as Harvey Weinstein or Roman Polański, people of color as Bill Cosby or Morgan Freeman sexually harass women or when homosexuals as in Kevin Spacey harass men. It would be the "wet dream of political correctness". Eckhart was criticized for the statement "Jews have always fought against the accusation that they only care about money, and now suddenly it turns out that they really don’t care about money, they care about women, and that’s why they need the money." The Jüdische Allgemeine, a weekly newspaper representing politics, culture and religion of German Judaism, wrote that her recipe for kabarett would be in the "simple breaking of taboos, which never were any – also in terms of antisemitism".

Felix Klein, the antisemitism commissioner of the German federal Government, called Eckhart’s contribution in 2018 "tasteless and reprehensible" and explained her punch line would be based on "antisemitism, racism and misanthropy". Ariane Lemme on the other hand defended Eckhart’s humor in the Taz, a German daily newspaper, under the title Satire must be allowed to hurt (Satire muss wehtun dürfen). The WDR, the German public-broadcasting institution responsible for broadcasting said contribution, defended Eckhart against the accusations with the reasoning that she wanted to expose stereotypes. As well as Henryk M. Broder of Die Welt, a national German newspaper, and Götz Aly of the Berliner Zeitung, a daily newspaper based in Berlin, who defended Eckhart against the accusation of antisemitism. Gerhard Haase-Hindenberg stated in the Jüdischen Allgemeine, a weekly newspaper representing politics, culture and religion of German Judaism, that he experienced Eckhart as an artist, who “exposes societal prejudices solely by exaggerating them”. Audiences welcome this breaking of taboos.

The ORF, an Austrian national public broadcaster, broadcast a performance of Eckhart on 9 November 2021, in which she asked: "Why are the Jews two noses ahead of women when it comes to humour?" In the Bayerischer Rundfunk, a Bavarian public service radio and television broadcaster, the music journalist Hardy Funk called her performance "clearly antisemitic" and evaluated, that her humor "would lack even a trace of a false bottom".

Especially towards criticism in November of 2021 of her program The Benefits of Vice (Die Vorteile des Lasters), which was published one year before, Eckhart described the reception as a "common reflex (…) of reaction to certain triggering words", and as a "malicious misunderstanding" to the DPA, a major German news agency based in Hamburg, and asked the question of "How to handle antisemitism and racism? Do you elevate it to a taboo, or do you degrade it to a joke? I am always on the side of humor."

== Bibliography ==
Stage Poetry

- 2017: Metrische Taktlosigkeiten: Eine Einführung ins politische Korrektum. Schultz & Schirm Bühnenverlag, Wien, ISBN 978-3-9503907-6-6.

Novels

- 2020: Omama. Paul Zsolnay Verlag, Wien, ISBN 978-3-552-07201-5.
- 2022: Boum. Paul Zsolnay Verlag, Wien, ISBN 978-3-552-07307-4.

== Awards ==
- 2015: Austrian Cabaret Award - Award for As if you had better things to do
- 2017: Berliner Bär (B.Z. Culture Prize) - Poetry Slam Prize
- 2017: Pantheon Prize - Jury Prize Early Rage & Corrupt
- 2017: German Cabaret Prize - Sponsorship Award
- 2018: Deutscher Kleinkunstpreis - Prize of the City of Mainz
