= Der Heiland auf dem Eiland =

- Starring: Jürgen von der Lippe
- Country of origin: Germany

Original release
- Network: RTL

Der Heiland auf dem Eiland is a German television series.

== See also ==
- List of German television series
