= Abbuzze! Der Badesalz-Film =

1996 film

- Directed by: Roland Willaert
- Written by: Gerd Knebel; Hendrik Nachtsheim
- Starring: Gerd Knebel; Hendrik Nachtsheim
- Distributed by: Constantin Film
- Release date: 1996
- Country: Germany
- Language: German
- Box office: 717,000 admissions (Germany)

Abbuzze! Der Badesalz-Film is a German film starring the comedy duo Badesalz, directed by Roland Willaert. It was released in 1996.

== Reception ==
The film was the sixth most popular German film for the year with admissions of 716,839.
