= Judith Richter =

German actress (born 1978)

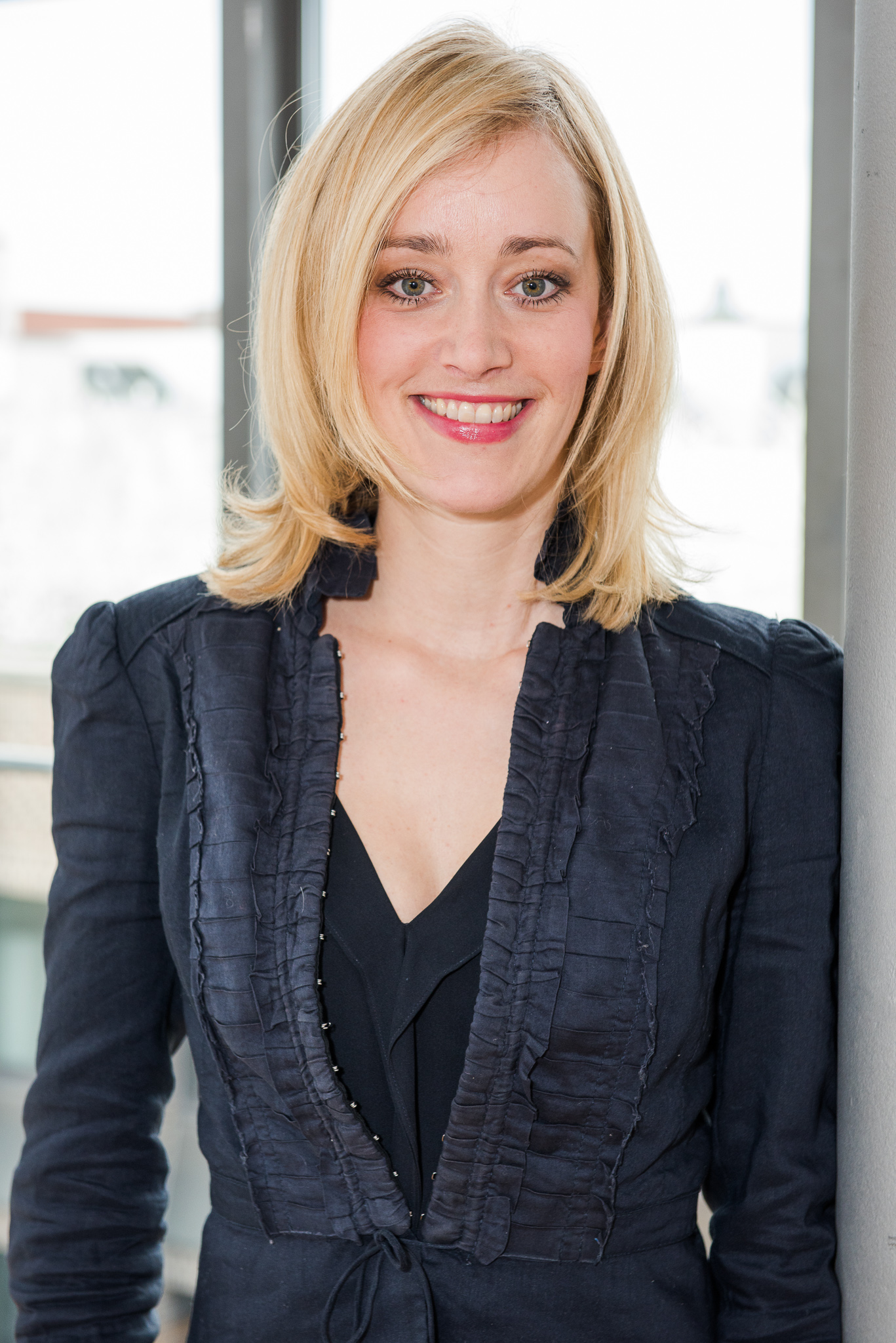

Judith Richter (born 15 November 1978 in Munich) is a German actress, best known for her roles in the movies Die Architekten (1990), Air Force One Is Down (2012), and the sketch comedy series Ladykracher (2002 - 2004), and SketchHistory (2015 - 2019). She received the Undine Award in 2004.
