= Alles Atze =

- Also known as: Everything Atze
- Created by: Hubertus Albers, Die SchreibWaisen
- Starring: Hubertus Albers
- Country of origin: Germany
- No. of seasons: 6
- No. of episodes: 63

Production
- Running time: 25 minutes

Original release
- Network: RTL Television
- Release: 7 January 2000 – 22 June 2007

Alles Atze (English: Everything Atze) is a German comedy television series which aired on RTL between 2000 and 2007. The series revolves around the fictional character Atze Schröder.

== Synopsis ==
Atze Schröder is a kiosk owner in Essen-Kray. He has a Turkish employee, named Murat. Schröder lives with his blond girlfriend Sabine, called "Biene", in an apartment behind the kiosk. Among his best friends and most loyal customers are bodybuilder Harry and police officer Viktor. His landlord Richard Plattmann, also called "Opa Pläte", appears regularly in the series.

Common themes in the series are betting, gender-specific differences, and Atze Schröder's drive for profit. One of the hallmarks of the series, above all, is that almost all of the characters speak "Ruhrdeutsch".

== See also ==
- List of German television series
