= Oncken =

Oncken is a surname. Notable people with the surname include:

- Arthur Oncken Lovejoy, a German-born American philosopher
- August Oncken (1844–1911), a German economist (German article)
- Hermann Oncken (1867–1945), a German historian
- Johann Gerhard Oncken (1800–1884), a pioneer German Baptist preacher
- Wilhelm Oncken (1835–1905), a German historian

== See also ==
- Onken (disambiguation)
