= Strike Back (album) =

Studio album by Steeler
- Released: 1 October 1986
- Genre: Heavy metal
- Length: 38:54
- Label: SPV/Steamhammer
- Producer: Frank Bornemann

Steeler chronology
Rulin' the Earth (1985)	Strike Back (1986)	Undercover Animal (1988)

Professional ratings
Review scores
Source	Rating
Kerrang!	5/5 stars

Strike Back was the third album by the German heavy metal band Steeler and produced by Frank Bornemann. It was released by SPV/Steamhammer in 1986.

== Track listing ==
All music by Peter Burtz, Tom Eder and Axel Rudi Pell. All Lyrics by Peter Burtz, except "Money Doesn't Count" by Burtz and Ric Browde

1. "Chain Gang" - 3:27
2. "Money Doesn't Count" - 4:43
3. "Danger Comeback" - 3:42
4. "Icecold" - 3:59
5. "Messin' Around with Fire" - 4:06
6. "Rockin' the City" - 3:50
7. "Strike Back" - 3:58
8. "Night After Night" - 4:58
9. "Waiting for a Star" - 4:38

== Credits ==
- Peter Burtz - vocals
- Axel Rudi Pell - lead guitar
- Tom Eder - lead guitar
- Roland Hag - bass guitar
- Jan Yildiral - drums
