= Crazy Race =

- Directed by: Michael Keusch
- Written by: Günter Knarr; Philipp Weinges
- Release date: March 23, 2003
- Country: Germany
- Language: German

Crazy Race is 2003 a German comedy television film. Alternative titles are Crazy Race — The Wrath of the Tsar and Crazy Race — The Craziest Race in the World. The film premiered on March 23, 2003, on RTL with a total audience of 6.23 million.

The film's subtitle at the premiere was The Craziest Race in the World. This title was also used on the DVD. However, when it was broadcast for the second time on RTL, the title of the film was The Wrath of the Tsar.

== Plot ==
Marc Weller used to be a racing driver and now makes a living returning luxury cars to car dealers that buyers don't pay for. Marc has the misfortune of mistaking gangster Tsintatse's Ferrari for a financially weak buyer's car and crashing his car during a chase. Tsintatse gives Marc a choice: either he wins an illegal car race across Germany to use the prize money to replace the Ferrari, or face the consequences. Unexpectedly, Marc's eight-year-old daughter Tina shows up at the door for her weekend visit, and he reluctantly has to take her to the race. It doesn't help that the young policewoman Andrea stops him for a check and he has to kidnap her to avoid going to prison. The race organizer Berger also takes part in the race to keep the money in the house, with a car equipped with an AI computer. Susi, who has no money, also takes part with her two children and a hearse containing the coffin of her late husband, who originally wanted to take part in the race. Tsintatse's idiotic henchmen named Jesus and Andi also arrive, who are supposed to monitor Marc, but soon develop a fatal inclination for sipping gasoline. And then there is the imperious police chief von Moltke, who has a personal bone to pick with illegal racers.

== Cast ==
- Kai Lentrodt as Marc Weller
- Julia Stinshoff as Andrea
- Gennadi Vengerov as Tsintatse
- Christian Tramitz as Berger
- Sissi Perlinger as Susi
- Ingolf Lück as Police Chief von Moltke
- Lars Niedereichholz as Andi
- Ande Werner as Jesus
- Ottfried Fischer as Policeman
- Dirk Bach as Boris
- Katy Karrenbauer as Camper
- Thierry van Werveke as Vanderbrügge
- Ludger Pistor as Dr. P. Schneider

== Sequels ==
Crazy Race has spawned three sequels: Crazy Race 2 – Warum die Mauer wirklich fiel was broadcast on November 21, 2004, Crazy Race 3 – Sie knacken jedes Schloss on January 5, 2007, and African Race – Die verrückte Jagd nach dem Marakunda on January 1, 2008, on the private channel RTL.

== Reception ==
The film was seen by 6.23 million viewers in Germany. The sequel achieved even higher ratings.

Unpretentious chaos comedy with a cast of German comedy stars that offers the very familiar recipes of the genre with flashy characters and lots of slapstick.

— Lexicon of international film
