= Dora Heldt =

German writer (born 1961)

- Born: Bärbel Schmidt; List on Sylt, Germany
- Occupation: Writer
- Writing career
- Language: German
- Years active: 2006–present

Dora Heldt (born Bärbel Schmidt on 10 November 1961) is a German writer. Several of her novels have reached the top of German bestselling lists, including her 2009 novel Tante Inge haut ab, which got to second place.

== Biography ==
Schmidt was born in 1961 on the island of Sylt, the daughter of a German soldier. After training as a bookseller in Bad Godesberg and working as a representative for the German publishing house dtv Verlagsgesellschaft, she drew attention to herself under the pseudonym Dora Heldt with her novels about Christine and her idiosyncratic father Heinz. Schmidt has been an active handball player for many years. She lives with her family in Hamburg.

=== Writing ===
Schmidt has been writing under the pseudonym Dora Heldt, the name of her grandmother, starting with her first novel, Ausgeliebt (2006). The novel reached the bestseller list (35th place in January 2006), but it was only with her third book, Urlaub mit Papa, in 2008, that she achieved her breakthrough as a bestselling author. A film adaptation of the book was made in the summer of 2009 for ZDF, starring Julia Stinshoff as Christine, Lambert Hamel as Heinz, and Steffen Groth as Johann.

With her novel Kein Wort zu Papa, she made it to number 1 on the bestseller list for the first time, in 2010. She reached the top of the list again with her subsequent books Bei Hitze ist es wenigstens nicht kalt (2011), Wind aus West mit starken Böen (2014), Wir sind die Guten (2017), and Drei Frauen am See (2018).

In addition to writing adult novels, Schmidt has also published the young adult novel Siebenmeter für die Liebe, in 2008.

== Bibliography ==
Adult novels

- Ausgeliebt (2006) – English title: Life After Forty
- Unzertrennlich (2006) – English title: Inseparable
- Urlaub mit Papa (2008) – English title: Chaperoned
- Siebenmeter für die Liebe (2008)
- Tante Inge haut ab (2009) – English title: Tidal Shift
- Kein Wort zu Papa (2010)
- Bei Hitze ist es wenigstens nicht kalt (2011)
- Herzlichen Glückwunsch, Sie haben gewonnen! (2013)
- Wind aus West mit starken Böen (2014)
- Böse Leute (2016)
- Wir sind die Guten (2017)
- Drei Frauen am See (2018)
- Mathilda oder Irgendwer stirbt immer (2020)

Young adult novels

- Siebenmeter für die Liebe (2008)

Collections

- Wiehnachten as jümmers... (2013)
- Schnee ist auch nur hübschgemachtes Wasser: Wintergeschichten (2017)
- Sommer. Jetzt! Sonnige Geschichten (2018)

== Film adaptations ==
- Vacation with Dad (2009)
- Aunt Inge Beats Loose (2011)
- Don't Tell Dad (2012)
- When It's Hot, at Least It's Not Cold (2012)
- Out of Love (2013)
- Inseparable (2014)
- Congratulations! You're a Winner! (2014)
- A Westerly Wind with Sudden Squalls (2016)
