= Teddy Teclebrhan =

German comedian and actor (born 1983)

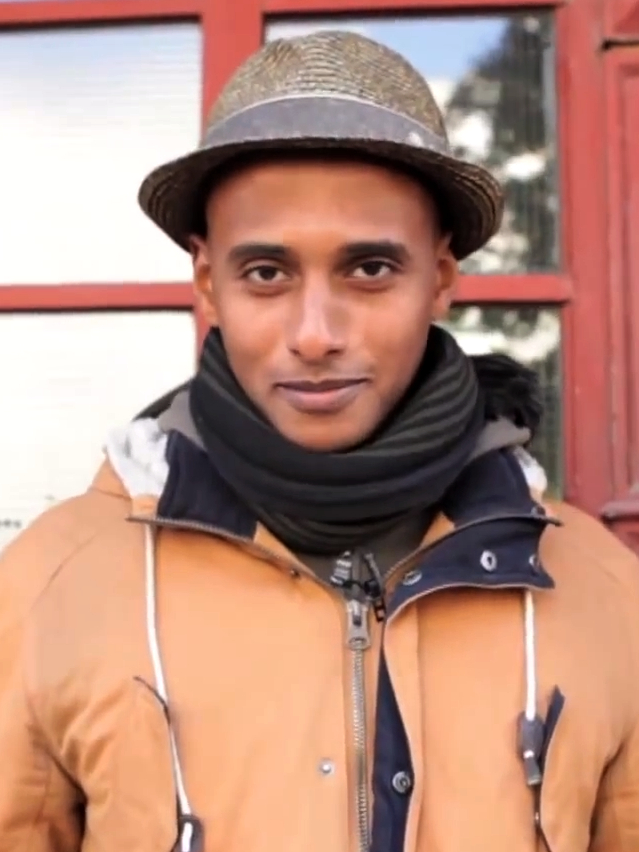
- Teclebrhan in 2012
- Born: Tedros Teclebrhan; 1 September 1983 (age 43); Asmara, Ethiopia
- Other names: Antoine Burtz, Percy, Ernst Riedler, Carlos, Lohan Cohan
- Occupations: Comedian, actor
- Known for: Umfrage zum Integrationstest (was nicht gesendet wurde); Teddy Comedy
- Website: teddy-sein-laden.de

Tedros "Teddy" Teclebrhan (born 1 September 1983) is a German comedian and actor, best known for his stand-up stage-comedy Teddy Comedy.

== Biography ==
Teclebrhan was born in Asmara, Eritrea in 1983 and was the youngest of three sons. He grew up in Mössingen, Germany. After the Zivildienst, he attended an international acting academy, the CreArte in Stuttgart, from which he graduated in 2008.

Teclebrhan first appeared on television in 2009, where he played a Swabian gas station leaseholder in Laible und Frisch on the network SWR and a drug dealer from the Rhineland in Stolberg on the network ZDF.

In 2009, Teclebrhan had his stage debut in the musical Hairspray. From December 2009 to September 2010, he played the role of Seaweed J. Stubbs.

He first gained wide attention with the 2011 uploaded YouTube video Umfrage zum Integrationstest (was nicht gesendet wurde) ("Poll of integration test (outtakes)"), where he was first seen in his first self-created-role "Antoine". The video has gained over 42 million views as of November 2021.

In May 2012, his first videos of the stage program Teddy's Show were broadcast on ZDFneo. The show contained stand-up comedy, a live band and chatting with guests. Besides Antoine, Teclebrhan also played new self-created characters there – "Percy", "Lohan Cohan", "Ernst Riedler" and "Ringo Fleischer".

In April 2012, he celebrated the premiere and start of his comedy-stage tour Teddy Show – Was labersch du…?! in Germany, Austria and Switzerland.

In 2013, he published the webseries Bootcamp on his YouTube channel TeddyComedy.

In the film Half Brothers by director Christian Alvart, in 2014, Teclebrhan assumed a leading role on the side of Fahri Yardım and Sido.

In 2021, he was the runner-up in Amazon Prime's first series of Last One Laughing Deutschland. The winner Thorsten Sträter chose to share his prize with Teclebrhan. Teddy Teclebrhan went on to win series 7 in 2026.

== Filmography ==
Television

- 2009–2010: Laible und Frisch
- 2011: Stolberg
- 2011–2014: Teddy's Show
- 2012: Stuttgart Homicide – Tödliches Idyll
- 2012: Und weg bist du
- 2013: Lotta und die frohe Zukunft
- 2015: Der Verlust
- 2020: Bad Banks (TV series)
- 2021: Last One Laughing Deutschland
- 2026: Last One Laughing Deutschland

Film

- 2006: Beles (short film)
- 2007: The Roof is on Fire
- 2007: Amselfeld (trailer)
- 2009: Ebony & Ivory (short film)
- 2010: Sascha
- 2010: Kyra, Paris
- 2012: Plötzlich 70!
- 2013: Among Enemies
- 2014: Die Mamba
- 2015: Half Brothers
- 2019: System Crasher
- 2022: "The Magic Flute" as Mr. Baumgartner

== Theatre ==
- 2007: Ein ungleiches Paar as Manolo
- 2008: Don Juan oder die Liebe zur Geometrie as Don Juan
- 2007: Das Orchester as Leon
- 2008: Schlafwagen Pegasus as an angel, a porter and rolling stone
- 2008: Das lange Weihnachtsmahl as Charles
- 2008: Der nackte Wahnsinn as Tim
- 2009–2011: Hairspray (musical) as Seaweed
- 2010: Love

== Comedy ==
- 2011: Umfrage zum Integrationstest (short film) as a participant on a poll
- 2012: Teddy Show – Tournee Süd (stage program with Teddy and band) as Teddy, Percy, Lohan Cohan and Antoine
- 2011: Antoine's Traum (short film/documentary) as Antoine
- 2013: Bootcamp as Antoine
- 2013: Teddy Show – Deutschlandtournee (stage program with Teddy and Band) as Teddy, Percy, Lohan Cohan, Carlos and Antoine
- 2014: Teddy Show – Deutschlandtournee (stage program with Teddy and Band) as Teddy, Ernst Riedler, Percy, Lohan Cohan, Carlos and Antoine
- 2015: Teddy Show – Deutschlandtournee (stage program with Teddy and Band) as Teddy, Ernst Riedler, Percy, Lohan Cohan, Carlos and Antoine
