= Badesalz =

German comedy duo

Badesalz (literally "bath salt") was a comedy duo from the (West) German state of Hesse, founded in 1982 by Hendrik "Henni" Nachtsheim (born 15 March 1957 in Wuppertal, Germany) and Gerd Knebel (30 March 1953 in Rodgau, Germany - January 24, 2026) as "Badesalz Theater". They sometimes talked with a strong Hessian accent during their performances and sketches.

Nachtsheim had been one of two lead vocalists and had also played saxophone in the rock band de:Rodgau Monotones, while Knebel was the lead singer of the comedy rock combo de:Flatsch. They had several shows on German TV ('Och Joh' (ARD), Comedy-Stories (Sat.1), 'Badesalz' Comedy Central).

Their work included numerous albums, several films, and a book.

== Discography ==
- 1990 – Och Joh
- 1991 – Nicht ohne meinen Pappa (DE: #70)
- 1993 – Diwodaso (DE: #15)
- 1994 – Alles Gute von Badesalz – BEST OF (DE: # 31)
- 1995 – Zarte Metzger (DE: #9)
- 1997 – Wie Mutter und Tochter (DE: #4)
- 1999 – Voodoobabbbel (DE: #16)
- 2000 – Dabrauchemergarnetdrübberredde – BEST OF (DE: # 96)
- 2002 – Du packst es, Jutta! (DE: #16)
- 2004 – Das Baby mit dem Goldzahn
- 2014 – Alleswassesaufcedesogegebbehat!
- 2018 – mailbox TERROR

== Films ==
- 1989 – Das Super Dong Dong (VHS, Tourprogramm)
- 1990 – Och Joh
- 1996 – Abbuzze! Der Badesalz-Film, 2006 also on DVD Special Edition
- 1999 – Badesalz Comedy-Stories
- 2003 – Hammersbald (DVD, Tourprogramm)
- 2007 – Badesalz

== Tour programs ==
- from 1985 – Das Super Dong-Dong
- from 1992 – Der König und Frau Batz
- from 1994 – uffgeplugged
- from 1996 – se meking of
- from 1997 – voll de Honig
- from 2000 – Kubbba
- from 2002 – Hammersbald
- from 2004 – Das Baby mit dem Goldzahn
- from 2007 – Dugi Otok

== Books ==
- Badesalz, Vaz Daz Den?. Möller Verlag, 1993, ISBN 3-8159-0021-2.

== See also ==
- German television comedy
