= Torsten Sträter =

German writer, satirist and stand-up comedian

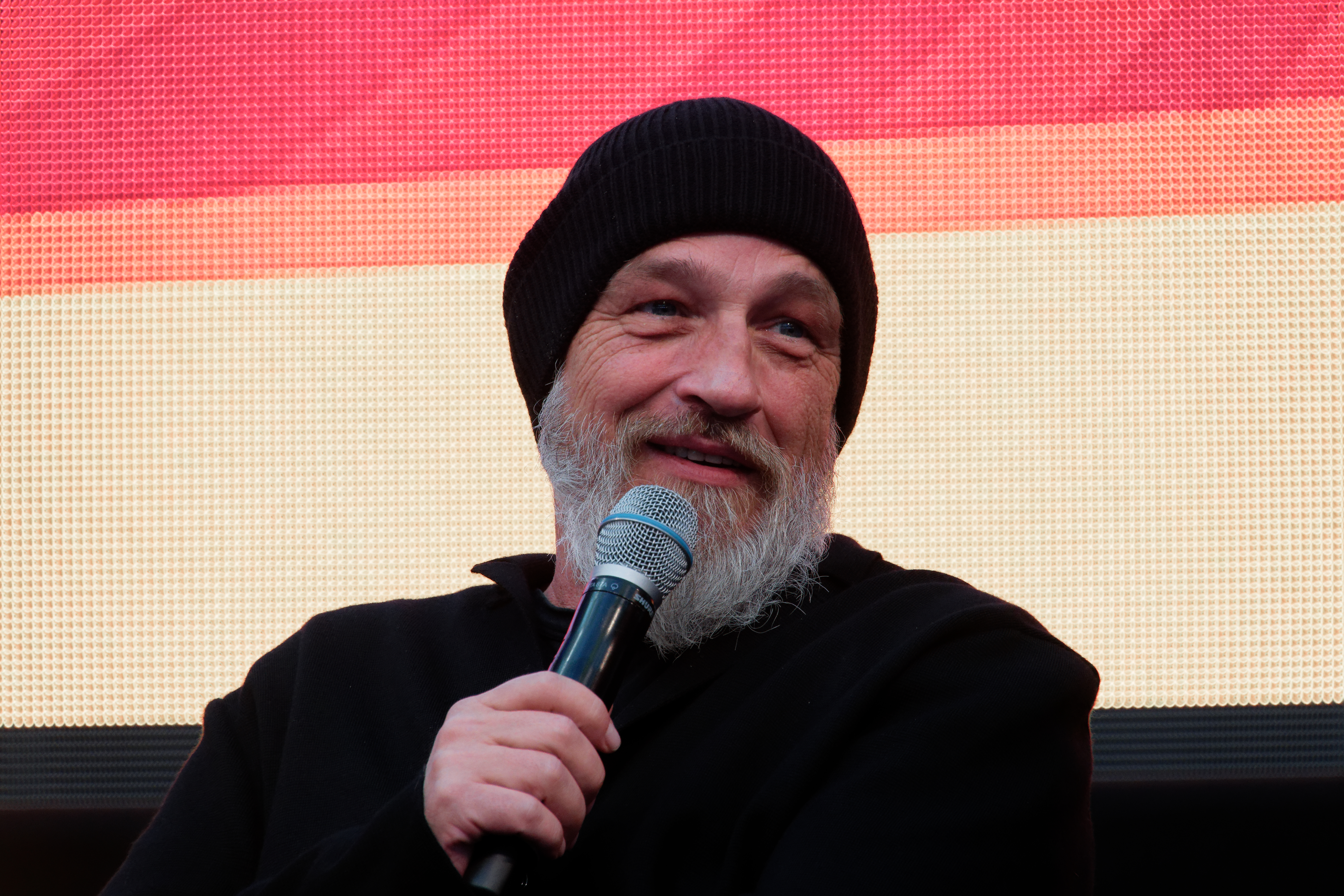
Sträter in 2024

Torsten Sträter (born 4 September 1966 in Dortmund) is a German author, comedian and kabarettist.

== Life ==
Torsten Sträter was born in the Eving district ofDortmund, at his grandmother's house. The next day the family moved to Waltrop and he returned to Dortmund when he was 16, where he trained as a men's tailor. He then did 15 months of basic military service in the Bundeswehr, where he was stationed in Neustadt am Rübenberge. Afterwards he worked in mobile phone sales, and for his family's shipping company.

In the mid-1990s Torsten Sträter suffered from a depressive illness, which he also dealt with in cabaret. He was on stage for the first time in 2006 when he was still suffering from depression.

He is a frequent guest on Extra 3 Sträter won the first series of Amazon Prime's LOL: Last One Laughing Deutschland in 2021. He decided to share his €50,0000 prize with runner-up Teddy Tcherbanan, and both donated their prize money to charity.

His trademark look includes a black Beanie.

He is the father of one child and lives in Dortmund.

== Works by Sträter ==
- Hämoglobin, Eldur Verlag, 2004, ISBN 978-3-937419-03-9.
- Postkarten aus der Dunkelheit, Eldur Verlag, 2005, ISBN 978-3-937419-10-7.
- Hit the Road, Jack!, Eldur Verlag, 2006, ISBN 978-3-937419-11-4.
- Brainspam, Eldur Verlag, 2006, ISBN 978-3-937419-17-6.
- Der David ist dem Goliath sein Tod, Carlsen Verlag, 2011, ISBN 978-3-548-37535-9.
- Selbstbeherrschung umständehalber abzugeben, Carlsen Verlag, 2012, ISBN 978-3-551-68481-3.
- Selbstbeherrschung umständehalber abzugeben, Ullstein Taschenbuch, 2014, ISBN 978-3-548-37534-2.
- Als ich in meinem Alter war, Lappan Verlag, 2016, ISBN 978-3-8303-3406-4.
- Es ist nie zu spät, unpünktlich zu sein, Ullstein Taschenbuch, 2017, ISBN 978-3-548-06352-2.
- Sträters Gutenachtgeschichten, Ullstein Verlag, 2021, ISBN 978-3-548-06454-3.
- Du kannst alles lassen, du musst es nur wollen, Ullstein Verlag, 2022, ISBN 978-3-864-93227-4.
