= Jürgen von der Lippe =

German entertainer

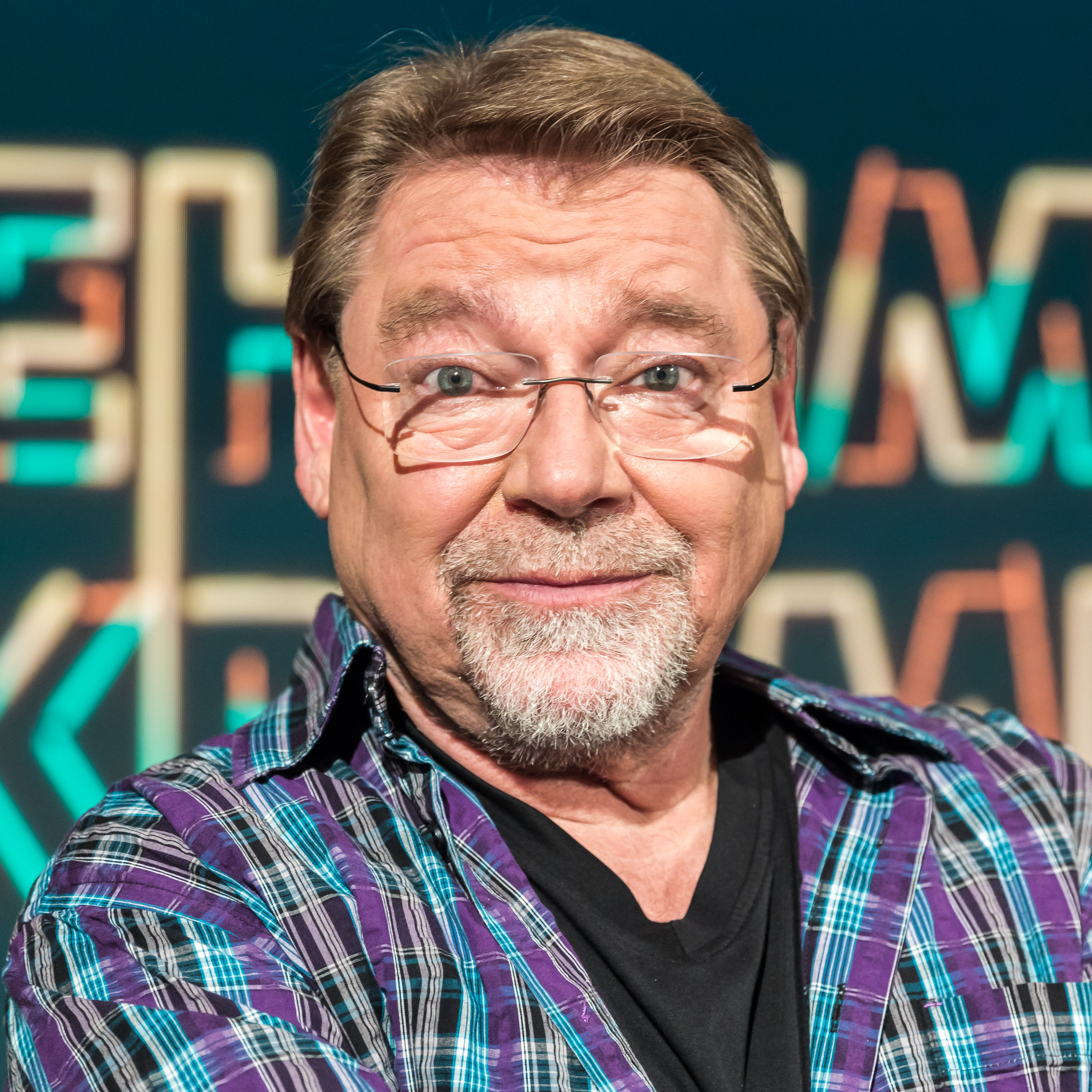
- Von der Lippe in 2018
- Born: Hans-Jürgen Hubert Dohrenkamp; 8 June 1948 (age 78); Bad Salzuflen, Germany
- Occupations: Television presenter, actor, comedian, entertainer
- Known for: Presenting the game shows Donnerlippchen (1986–1988) and Geld oder Liebe (1989–2001)

Hans-Jürgen Hubert Dohrenkamp (born 8 June 1948), better known by his stage name Jürgen von der Lippe, is a German television presenter, entertainer, actor, musician and comedian. His stage name comes from the fact that he was born near the source of the river Lippe.

== Life ==
Jürgen von der Lippe was born Hans-Jürgen Dohrenkamp in Bad Salzuflen and grew up in Aachen, where he attended the Kaiser-Karls-Gymnasium and was a Catholic altar boy. His father was the barkeeper in a striptease bar.

From 1967 to 1970 he trained as a signaller in the Bundeswehr, leaving the armed forces a lieutenant.

In 1976 he, Hans Werner Olm and others founded the music group Gebrüder Blattschuss (Brothers Blattschuss – literally, Blattschuss is a hunting term for a shot through the shoulder into the heart; figuratively, it means getting one's point across succinctly.)

From 1986 to 1988 he was married (his second marriage) to the famous German television presenter Margarethe Schreinemakers.

Before his career in show business, he began studying German language and literature, philosophy and linguistics in Aachen and Berlin, but without graduating.

== Television career ==
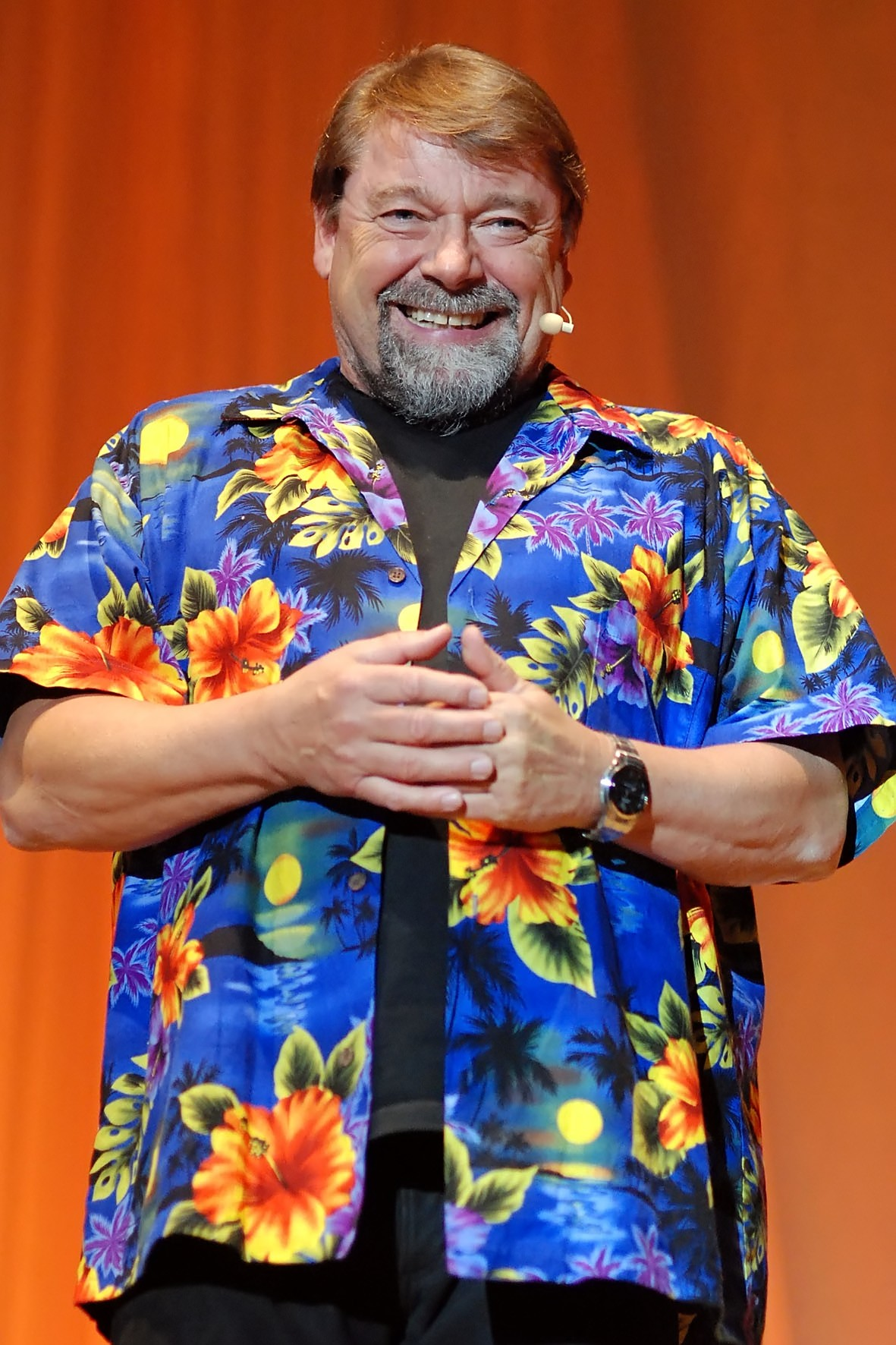
Von der Lippe in 2008

Jürgen von der Lippe's first major success was Donnerlippchen ("Little Thunder Lips") on WDR television station. He went on to present another very successful dating show, Geld oder Liebe ("Money or Love") on ARD; this finished in 2001 after twelve years on air.

Some other public service broadcasting programmes of his included WWF Club (1980–1990), So isses ("That's how it is"), Die Goldene Eins ("The Golden No. 1"), Hast Du Worte ("Got words?"), Wat is? ("Whassup?"), Lippes Lachmix ("Lippe's Comedy Mix") and Was liest du? ("What are you reading?").

On commercial television, he presented the show Blind Dinner (Sat.1, 2001), and since 2001 he has presented the humorous Sat.1 review of the year's events, Wer zuletzt lacht ("He who laughs last").

In spring 2004 he played the main role of Father Erdmann in the comedy series Der Heiland auf dem Eiland ("The Saviour on the Island") on RTL Television. The first series of six episodes was very successful. The second series ran from 23 February 2005, this time with eight episodes. Jürgen von der Lippe had already played a Catholic priest in the comedy Nich' mit Leo, in which he also played a brothel manager and a Foreign Legionnaire.

As of 2007, he sometimes appears in the improvisational comedy series Schillerstraße, playing the role of Cordula Stratmann's father. Since 15 July 2006, von der Lippe has also presented the programme Extreme Activity on the commercial station ProSieben.

== Career as a singer ==
In 1976, von der Lippe founded the "Gebrüder Blattschuss", which lasted until 1979. His greatest musical success, however, was Guten Morgen, liebe Sorgen ("Good morning, dear worries"), which made it to first place in the ZDF hit parade in July and August 1987.

== Stage programme ==
Von der Lippe's stage appearances have been sold in large numbers as soundtracks and videos. Typically, he dissects odd quirks and everyday events, expertly poking gentle fun at them, with plenty of self-irony. He makes playful use of amusing borrowed words and synonyms in German.

The main themes are marriage, relationships between men and women and the way people act in certain situations. He often brings in fictitious "autobiographical" stories supposed to be from his youth or childhood, often based on his old "arch enemy" "Udo Lohmeier". Each show generally has a topic running through it. When on tour, von der Lippe also likes to vary the content of his stage shows, integrating current events.

One recurring element over the years has also been von der Lippe's parodies of well-known German stars such as Udo Lindenberg, Peter Maffay and Helge Schneider.

Many of his sketches are literal translations from Bill Cosby (e.g. Rache = revenge) or George Carlin (e.g. interview with Jesus).

During his career, von der Lippe has created many characters who appear and reappear in monologues and songs, often played by von der Lippe himself in costume. These include a naive Catholic priest who reflects on human behaviour (often sexual), a postal worker from the Sauerland, with an appropriate accent, and "Kalle", a Berlin heavy metal fan.

Singles

Guten Morgen, liebe Sorgen (1987)
Germany: 3 (5 June 1987) 15 weeks
Austria: 11 (15 September 1987) 18 weeks
Dann ist der Wurm drin (1987)
G: 28
Is was (1989)
G: 65
König Der City (1992)
G: 83

Albums

Guten Morgen, liebe Sorgen (1987)
G: 4
Is was? (1989)
G: 62
Der Blumenmann (1995)
G: 78
Männer, Frauen, Vegetarier (1998)
G: 23 (23 January 1998) 15 weeks
So bin ich (2001)
G: 59 (20 April 2001) 3 weeks

== Albums ==
- 1977: Sing was Süßes
- 1978: Nicht am Bär packen!
- 1979: Extra Drei
- 1980: Zwischen allen Stühlen
- 1982: Kenn'Se den?
- 1983: Ein Mann Show
- 1985: Teuflisch gut! (LP title; published on CD as "Man kann nicht immer Sieger sein")
- 1987: Guten Morgen, liebe Sorgen
- 1989: Is was
- 1990: Humor ist Humor
- 1992: König der City
- 1995: Der Blumenmann
- 1998: Männer, Frauen, Vegetarier
- 1999: Die andere Seite
- 2001: Große Männer (Best-of sampler)
- 2001: So bin ich
- 2004: Alles was ich liebe

== Awards ==
- 2019: Deutscher Fernsehpreis – Ehrenpreis
- 2006: Deutscher Comedypreis – Ehrenpreis für sein Lebenswerk
- 1999: ECHO for Media Man of the Year
- 1996: Bambi für TV Moderation
- 1994: Adolf Grimme Award for Geld oder Liebe
- 1993: Goldene Kamera for Geld oder Liebe
- 1992: Telestar for Geld oder Liebe
- 1988: Bronzene Kamera, audience choice in comedy category
- 1987: Goldene Schallplatte for "Guten Morgen liebe Sorgen"
- 1987: Goldener Löwe from RTL for Guten Morgen, liebe Sorgen
- 1982: Liederpfennig

== See also ==
- German television comedy
- List of German comedians
