= Murat Topal =

Turkish-Austrian futsal player

Murat Topal (born 5 April 1976) is a Turkish-Austrian futsal player. He currently plays for Stella Rossa Vienna, and previously played amateur and professional level for Post SV, FavAC, Fenerbahçe, Admira Wacker, DSV Leoben, SC Kottingbrunn, Sturm Graz, SV Aspern, IC Favoriten, SC Ritzing, SV Aspern, SV Leobendorf, SV Würmla, SC Lassee.

He is a member of the Turkey national futsal team in the UEFA Futsal Championship.
