= Letterbox company =

Letterbox company may refer to:

- Brass plate company, company lacking meaningful connection with the location of incorporation
- Shell corporation, company that exists only on paper and has no office and no employees
- A business that makes letterboxes
