= Anne Onken =

German radio presenter and comedian (born 1977)

Anne Onken (born 1977 in Oldenburg) is a German radio presenter and comedian.

Onken was born the daughter of a priest in Oldenburg and started to imitate voices from an early age. Her first successful radio programme was Die Pisa-Polizei with N-Joy and SWR 3, in which she confronted schoolchildren on the street and asked them difficult questions from various subject areas.

In 2005 she began to imitate the voice of politician (and later Federal Chancellor) Angela Merkel on The Gerd Show. Her successful work with Elmar Brandt (who imitated Gerhard Schröder) culminated in the popular song "Im Wahlkampf vor mir liegt ein Zonenmädchen", which reached no. 25 in the German charts during the run up to the 2005 German federal elections.

Shortly before the elections the television broadcaster Sat.1 showed short sketches with Onken and Brandt. Since then Onken has been acclaimed as the best imitator of Angela Merkel in Germany.

In October 2005 The Gerd Show was replaced by a new comedy serial, Angela - Schicksalsjahre einer Kanzlerin - Eine Frau geht seinen Weg. Like The Gerd Show, it was produced by Elmar Brandt and played by Onken using her imitation of Angela Merkel.

== Sources ==
- This article is based on a translation of the corresponding German-language Wikipedia article, retrieved on July 6, 2006.
