= Ladykracher =

German sketch comedy show

- Genre: Comedy
- Country of origin: Germany
- Original language: German

Production
- Running time: 25 minutes
- Production company: Brainpool TV AG

Original release
- Network: Sat.1; Comedy Central Germany
- Release: 11 January 2002 – 31 May 2013

Ladykracher was a German sketch comedy show starring Anke Engelke. The show ran on Sat.1 from 2002 to 2004 and was produced by Brainpool. In 2008 the show was reproduced until 2013.

== Skits ==
All Ladykracher skits feature Anke Engelke. The promotion for the show said "The woman with 250 faces", referring to Anke's talent for slipping into many different roles.

== Cast ==
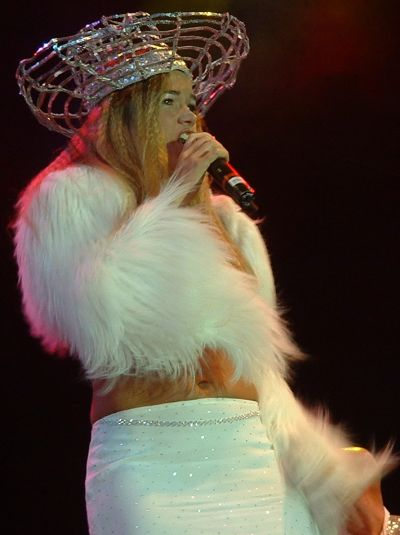
Anke Engelke

Actor	Seasons	Guest appearance
Anke Engelke	1–8	
Kai Lentrodt	1, 3–8	
Bettina Lamprecht	1–8	
Matthias Matschke	2–8	
Katja Liebing	1–3	
Christoph Maria Herbst	1–3	4
Dana Golombek	1–3	
Guido Hammesfahr	1–3	
Thomas Gimbel	1–3	
Julia Stinshoff	1–2	
Peter Nottmeier	1	
Sandra Borgmann	2	
Diana Greenwood	3	
Angela Sandritter	3	
Friederike Kempter	4–8	
Charly Hübner	4–8	
Daniel Wiemer	4–8	
Holger Stockhaus	4–8	
Lena Dörrie	4–8	

=== Other guest appearances ===
- Oliver Welke in season 3
- Bastian Pastewka in season 3
- Lena Meyer-Landrut in season 6 (episodes 3 and 5)

== See also ==
- German television comedy
