= Die Gerd-Show =

German satirical radio show (1999–2005)

Die Gerd-Show was a German satirical radio show broadcast by Eins Live (WDR). Reaching over nine million listeners at its peak, it generated several Top 20 hits in the music charts in Germany, thanks to the impressionist talents of its creator, Elmar Brandt, as well as enough controversy over the show's good taste for it to receive newspaper coverage around the globe, despite the limited international appeal of German political humor.

== History ==
The programme began in 1999, and was broadcast as a short daily comedy on various radio programmes. The most famous segments of these programmes were Elmar Brandt's rewrites of well-known tunes with new, satirical lyrics, which he sang in an imitation of the voice of Gerhard Schröder, who at that time was Chancellor of Germany. These parodies generated six hits in the Top 20 in Germany, and were also popular in Switzerland and Austria.

The most successful of these was Der Steuersong (en: The Tax-Song), which reached the number one spot in Germany and Austria in 2002, and went double platinum in 2004, having sold over a million copies. Based on Las Ketchup's summer dance hit Aserejé, the song lampooned Schröder's tax policy, listing a number of perceived absurd indirect taxes (such as a tax on dogs) and suggesting new ones on breathing and bad weather, and depicting the Chancellor as a cheat and a promise breaker. The song was accompanied by a video, in which an unflattering Spitting Image style puppet of Schröder stole coins from a charity collection tin, and medicine from the sick.

The song generated political controversy. Reports suggested that Schröder might take legal action, as he notoriously did—successfully—to stop a news agency printing claims that he dyed his hair, with a spokesman for Schröder's Social Democrats saying "There are limits even to political satire... We will take a look at the video, and the chancellor will have to examine what steps to take."

Schröder did not in the end take legal action, but did call Brandt a "parasite" and "freeloader" for building a career on someone else's voice, to which Brandt rebutted "Freeloaders usually attach themselves to people who are successful". The German tabloid Bild voiced indignation, asking "Can the chancellor be mocked like this?", though most thought that the song reflected genuine discontent with Schröder's tax policies and that Schröder took the song too seriously.

In 2003, Brandt took part in the German auditions for the Eurovision Song Contest 2003 with the song Alles wird gut (en: Everything's Going To Be Alright). The act, which featured another puppet of Schröder simulating sex with the four backing singers, the "Gerdnerinnen" (Gerdettes, a word play on the German word for gardener), received 30% of the German vote, taking third place and losing out to Lou's feel good anthem Let's Get Happy with 38%.

From 2005, Anne Onken imitated Angela Merkel on The Gerd Show, who would later beat Schröder to become chancellor. During the run-up to the 2005 German federal elections, a duet was released between Brandt as Schröder and Onken as Merkel, entitled Im Wahlkampf vor mir (Zonenmädchen) (en: Ahead of Me in the Polls (Girl from the East)) and set to the tune of Im Wagen vor mir fährt ein junges Mädchen by Hans Blum. Despite speculation that it would reach the top spot as Der Steuersong did before it, it only reached 25th place in the German charts.

In October 2005, The Gerd Show was canceled with 1,300 episodes. Its place was taken by the radio serial Schicksalsjahre einer Kanzlerin – Angela – eine Frau geht seinen Weg (en: Fateful Years of a Female Chancellor – Angela – A Woman follows his Path, alluding to the film Sissi – Fateful Years of an Empress), with Angela Merkel played by Anne Onken, and her male colleagues played by Elmar Brandt.

== Awards ==
- 2003 – ECHO nomination, for Best National Rock Pop Single
- 2002 – Einslive Krone, Best Comedy
- 1999 – Axel-Springer-Preis to Elmar Brandt, for his imitation of Gerhard Schröder
- 1999 – Deutscher Comedypreis, for Best Radio Comedy
