= Broti & Pacek – Irgendwas ist immer =

- Country of origin: Germany

Original release
- Network: Sat.1

Broti & Pacek – Irgendwas ist immer is a German television series.

== See also ==
- List of German television series
