= Hurra Deutschland =

Geeman television series

- Genre: Satire, Comedy
- Country of origin: Germany
- Original language: German

Original release
- Network: ARD
- Release: 1989 – 1991

Related
- Les Guignols de l'info (French original)

Hurra Deutschland (English: "Hurrah Germany") was a German satirical series running from June 19, 1989 to September 26, 1992, appearing regularly on TV station Das Erste.

== Overview ==
Hurra Deutschland was easily distinguished because of its use of rubber puppets modelled on politicians and celebrities, who were poked fun at in various sketches. The puppets were built out of latex by GUM Studios, who continue to make puppets even today (many of which were used in the new series).

The show was chiefly political in nature, with the main character undoubtedly being a bumbling and moronic Helmut Kohl, with supporting characters Willy Brandt, Hans-Jochen Vogel, Hans-Dietrich Genscher etc. Puppets from the German popular culture entered the ensemble to public appraisal, such as entertainer Thomas Gottschalk, singer Heino and tennis player Boris Becker.

== New Series ==
A new edition entitled "Hurra Deutschland - Jetzt erst recht!" (Literally: "Hurrah Germany - Now more than ever!") ran from June 23, 2003 to July 23, 2004. The show was "hosted" by puppets of Dieter Bohlen and Daniel Küblböck. However, general critical opinion was that the new series lacked the mordacity and audacity that the old one had - another complaint was that it focused too much on celebrities and sporting figures, whereas the original was so popular as a political series. The remake was cancelled after just one season.

== Inspiration ==
The show was modelled on the long-running British series Spitting Image, where many prominent personalities were also parodied with rubber puppets. The show took many key inspirations from its British predecessor, including use of film parody sketches and musical numbers.

== See also ==
- Rubbery Figures - a similar program that was made and aired in Australia
- Spitting Image - the British series on which Hurra Deutschland was based
