= Elmar Brandt =

German impressionist

Elmar Brandt is a German impressionist, best known for his imitations of politicians. He was born in Düsseldorf.

His most famous series is The Gerd Show, in which actual events are lampooned using an imitation of former German chancellor Gerhard Schröder. The Gerd Show was broadcast between 1999 and 2005 as a short daily comedy on various radio programmes. Other politicians and celebrities Brandt has imitated include former Minister-President of Bavaria Edmund Stoiber, Reiner Calmund, the late President Johannes Rau, Dieter Bohlen, Marcel Reich-Ranicki and ex-Foreign Minister Joschka Fischer; he also provided voices for the remake of German satirical puppet show Hurra Deutschland (the puppets of which were also used in the Gerd Show music videos).

Together with Peter Burtz, he also recorded various satirical songs, including "Steuersong" (2002).

== Awards ==
- 1998 - Axel-Springer-Preis
