= Atze Schröder =

German comedian

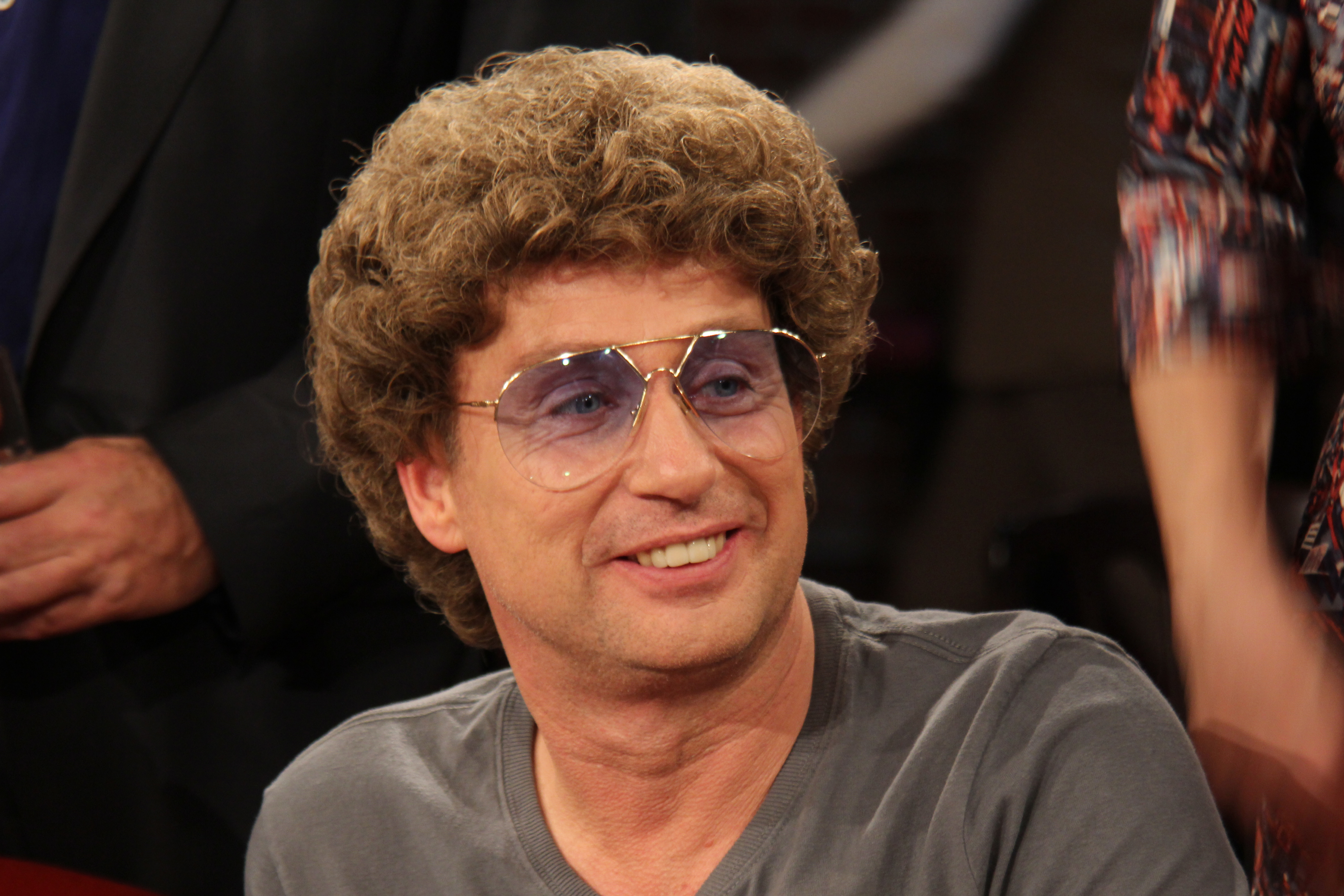
- Schröder in 2012
- Born: Hubertus Albers; September 27, 1965 (age 60); Emsdetten, West Germany
- Occupations: Comedian, actor
- Known for: Alles Atze

Atze Schröder is the pseudonym for the German comedian Hubertus Albers (born 27 September 1965) He is best known for playing the main character in the RTL comedy show Alles Atze (2000–2007) and for his appearances in the ProSieben stand-up comedy show Quatsch Comedy Club. He appears as himself in the 2008 German comedy film U-900.

== Comedic style ==
Atze Schröder always appears in character with a large brown wig and glasses which he cultivated for his appearance on Quatsch Comedy Club and Alles Atze. His comedic style has been described as "vulgar" and centers around his self-assured "Proll" (simple working class) persona living in the industrial Ruhr area of Germany.

== Personal life ==
Atze Schröder has been particular of only appearing in character in public and never revealing anything from his private life. However, his real name became public record in 1998, when Hubertus Albers registered the name "Atze Schröder" at the German Patent and Trade Mark Office. On 13 July 2007, the trademark was signed over to "Schröder, Atze bürgerlicher Name Albers, Hubertus" (Schröder, Atze real name Albers, Hubertus) from Emsdetten. This trademark was deleted on 1 November 2017.

Despite this, the comedian has repeatedly sued against the reveal of his real name, including in 2007 against Wikimedia Deutschland's then president for use on the German Wikipedia which led to the editorial decision to remove the real name. After an altercation with Niels Ruf in 2015, Ruf sued Schröder under his real name which led German tabloid Bild to use his real name in an article in 2016. Schröder in turn sued Bild for the use of his real name but lost in January 2018 which led to another mention. The court argued that Schröder invited the use of his real name because he started the altercation with Ruf as a private person and not in his Atze Schröder persona.

== Tours ==
- 1998: Nur so geht's
- 1999: Lecker
- 2001: Meisterwerke
- 2003: Goldene Zeiten
- 2005: Atze im Wunderland
- 2006: Kronjuwelen
- 2007: Mutterschutz
- 2009: Revolution
- 2011: Schmerzfrei
- 2013: Und dann kam Ute
- 2014: Richtig fremdgehen
- 2016: Turbo
- 2019: Echte Gefühle
- 2024: Der Erlöser

== Awards ==
- 2000: Deutscher Comedypreis – Best Comedy Act for Alles Atze
- 2003: Deutscher Comedypreis – Best Actor in a Comedy Show for Alles Atze
- 2003: Deutscher Fernsehpreis – Best Sitcom for Alles Atze
- 2005: Deutscher Comedypreis – Best Comedy Series for Alles Atze
