= Dirk Bach =

German actor, comedian and presenter (1961–2012)

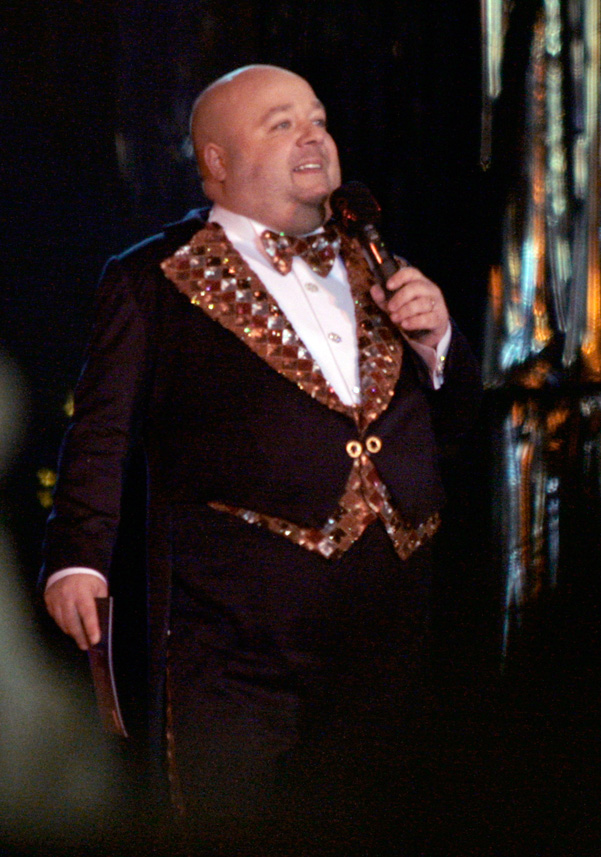
- Bach in 2009
- Born: 23 April 1961; Cologne, West Germany
- Died: 1 October 2012 (aged 51); Berlin, Germany
- Occupations: Actor; comedian; television presenter
- Years active: 1980–2012
- Partner: Thomas

Dirk Bach (23 April 1961 – 1 October 2012) was a German actor, comedian and television presenter, best known as the co-host of Ich bin ein Star – Holt mich hier raus!, the German version of I'm a Celebrity... Get Me Out of Here!.

== Career ==
Bach was born in Cologne. After school, he worked in theatres in Amsterdam, Brussels, London, New York, Utrecht, and Vienna. In 1992, Bach was a member of the theatre group in Cologne at the Schauspielhaus and appeared on the German television channel RTL on the Dirk Bach Show. He performed in Lukas (1996–2001) on the German TV channel ZDF, for which he received the Telestar award (1996), the German Comedy Award (1999), and the Goldene Kamera (2001).

In 2002, Bach starred in Der kleine Mönch on ZDF. He worked in Sesamstraße, the German version of Sesame Street, as the character Pepe. He often performed with Hella von Sinnen on different television productions. Starting 2004, Bach and Sonja Zietlow presented the German edition of the show I'm a Celebrity, Get Me Out of Here!. In 2005, he played the character Urmel in Urmel aus dem Eis (Impy's Island), In 2006, Bach was host of the German game show Frei Schnauze on RTL. In 2010, he appeared as Pastor Hinze on the soap opera Verbotene Liebe, in which he performed the first church wedding between two men ever dramatized on German television with characters Oliver Sabel and Christian Mann.

=== Other work ===
Bach was an LGBT activist and member of the LSVD organisation (Lesbian and Gay Federation in Germany). He was part of the campaign to bring the 2010 Gay Games to Cologne. He also helped Amnesty International and the organization PETA.

== Personal life and death ==
Bach lived together with his partner Thomas in Cologne.Bild

Bach died on 1 October 2012 in Berlin at the age of 51 from presumed heart failure."Dirk Bach tot - Herzversagen als Todesursache wahrscheinlich". berlin.de (in German)."Dirk Bach ist tot". Spiegel Online (in German). 1 October 2012.

After his death, the city of Cologne decided to commemorate Bach by naming a public square after him. In mid-2025 the area formerly known as the "kleiner Offenbachplatz" in front of the Schauspielhaus Köln at Offenbachplatz was officially renamed Dirk-Bach-Platz, reflecting his contribution as a theatre performer and entertainer, and marking his connection to the city's cultural life."Köln: Dirk-Bach-Platz offiziell benannt"."Hier findet man den Dirk-Bach-Platz in der Kölner City".

== Television ==
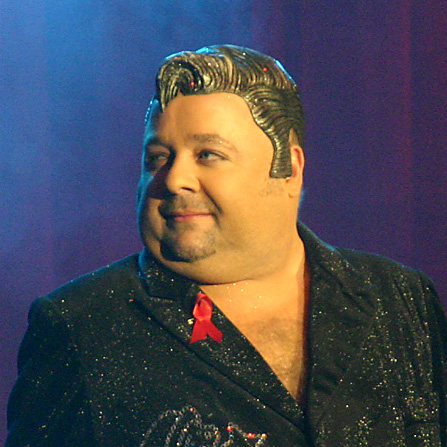
Bach in 2005

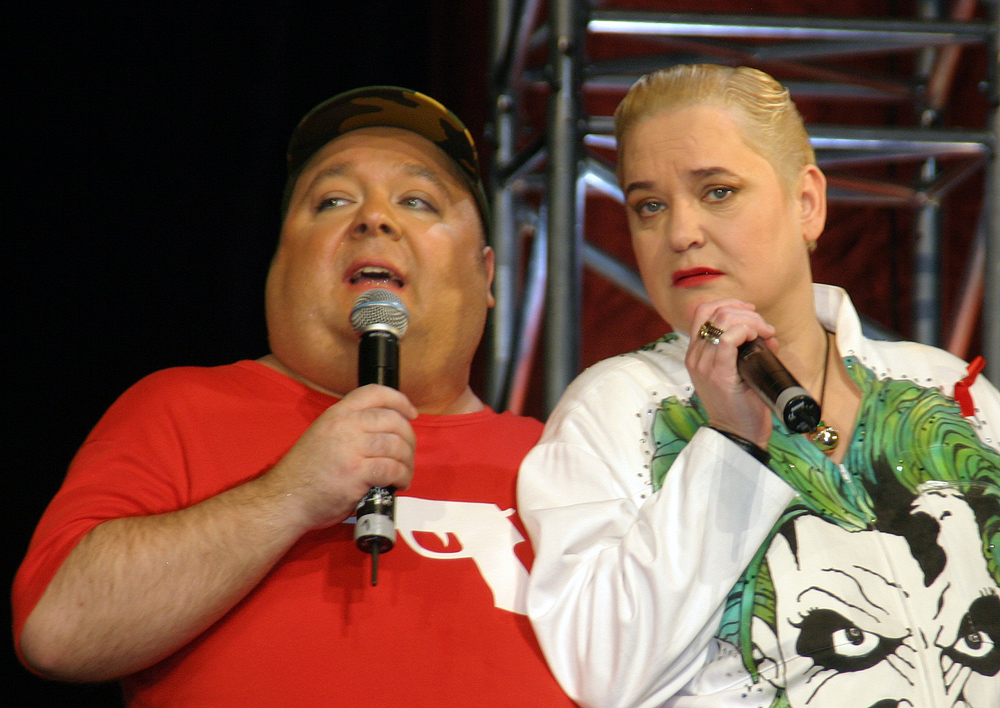
Bach alongside Hella von Sinnen in 2006

- 1983: Kiez
- 1984: Im Himmel ist die Hölle los
- 1986: Kir Royal (TV series)
- 1988: Krieg der Töne (TV experimental film)
- 1989: Year of the Turtle
- 1993: Kein Pardon
- 1994: Die Weltings vom Hauptbahnhof – Scheidung auf Kölsch (TV series)
- 1994: Drei zum Verlieben (TV series)
- 1995: Nich' mit Leo
- 1995: Marys verrücktes Krankenhaus (TV series)
- 1996: Lukas (TV series)
- 1997: Rendezvous des Todes (TV)
- 1998: Mrs. Rettich, Czerni and I
- 1998: Varell & Decker (TV series)
- 1999: Zum Sterben schön (TV)
- 2001: Das Rätsel des blutroten Rubins (TV)
- 2001: Der Mann, den sie nicht lieben durfte (TV)
- 2002: Der kleine Mönch (TV series)
- 2003: Karlchens Parade
- 2003: Crazy Race (TV)
- 2003: In Search of an Impotent Man
- 2004: Crazy Race 2 – Warum die Mauer wirklich fiel (TV)
- 2005: Make Love, Not Fat (TV)
- 2005: Urmel aus dem Eis (TV)
- 2006: Crocodile Alert (TV)
- 2006: Crazy Race 3 – Sie knacken jedes Schloss (TV)
- 2007: Die ProSieben Märchenstunde – Des Kaisers neue Kleider
- 2008: African Race – Die verrückte Jagd nach dem Marakunda (TV)
- 2009: Einfach Bach
- 2010: Teufel Gott und Kaiser – Nibelungenfestspiele Worms
