= Fips Asmussen =

German comedian (1938–2020)

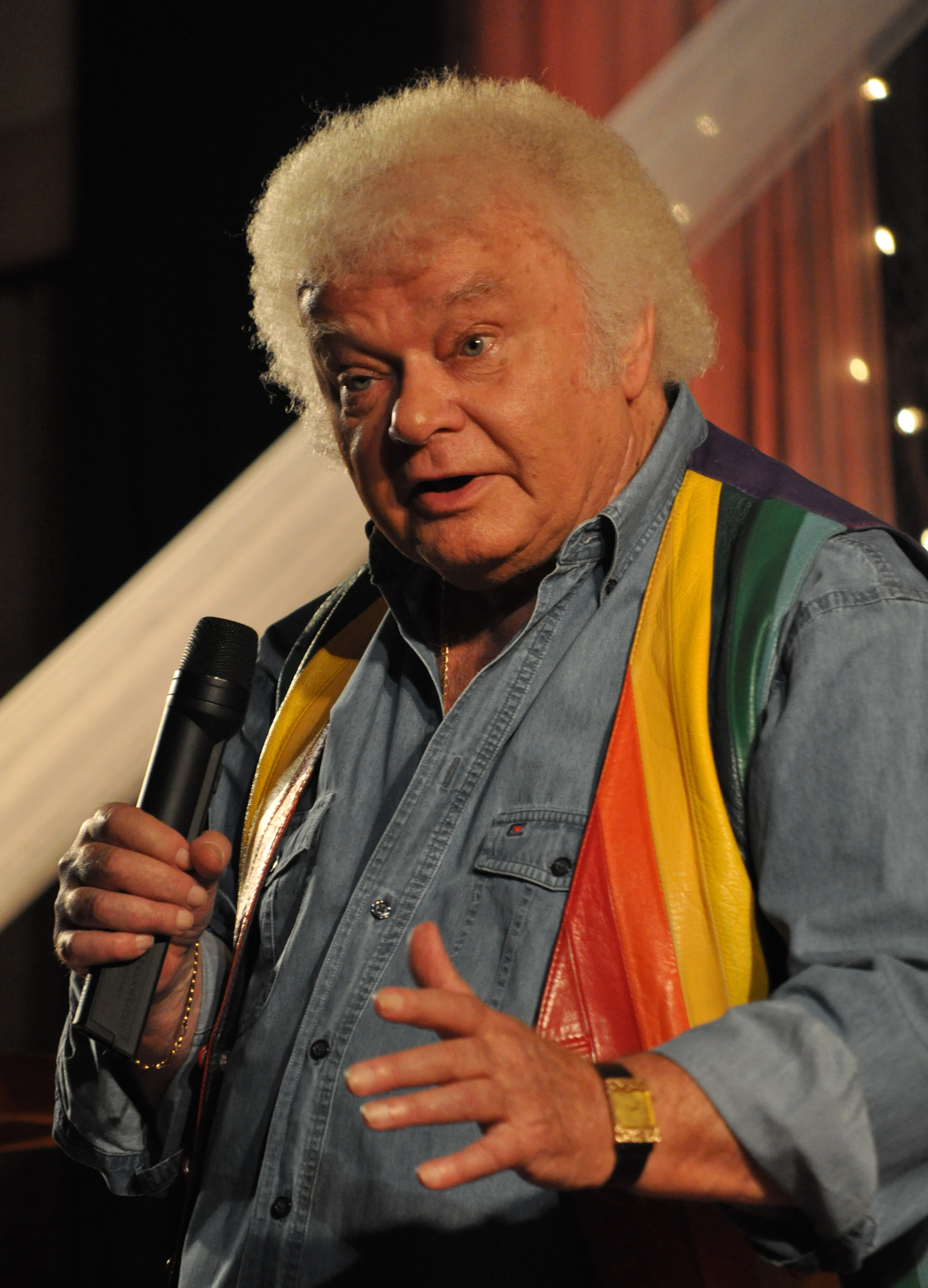
Fips Asmussen live in Rostock, Germany (2012)

Rainer Pries (30 April 1938 – 9 August 2020), better known by his stage name Fips Asmussen, was a German comedian and entertainer, known for his rapid delivery of puns and deliberately unfunny jokes.

== Life and career ==
Born Rainer Pries in Hamburg, he attended an advertising academy and graduated with a diploma as a skilled typesetter.

Since the early 1970s, he worked as a comedian, mostly on stage, sometimes on radio and TV. Many of his performances were released as frequently best-selling sound recordings. He also published several books.

Fips Asmussen's early comedy was more sophisticated and political. His later comedy performances became known for unfunny, mostly politically incorrect jokes and puns delivered in his trademark rapid stream, often considered to be "so unfunny they're funny again." He was frequently the butt of jokes by other comedians, but gained a cult following in Germany.

Oliver Kalkofe and Fips Asmussen maintained a humorous rivalry. Asmussen accused the entertainer and comedian Dieter Hallervorden several times of using various gags without his consent, such as the famous "bottle of French fries" skit ("Palim-Palim"), which Hallervorden bought for his program from the entertainer Heinz Quermann. This controversy was eventually parodied by Harald Schmidt and Oliver Pocher in the show "Schmidt & Pocher".

During the 90s the comedian lived in Wolfenbüttel and later in life in Querfurt, Saxony Anhalt, where he died on 9 August 2020.

== Music ==
Asmussen's version of "Mein Gott Walter" by Mike Krüger appeared in German single charts. He made parodies of other songs.

== CDs ==
- Witze am laufenden Band 1
- Witze am laufenden Band 2
- Eine Mütze voller Witze
- Au weia!
- Aber Hallo ...
- Das halt’ ich im Kopf nicht aus!
- Balla balla
- In der Haifischbar
- Schlag auf Schlag
- Kennen Sie den?
- Er nun wieder!
- Von Vegesack bis Titisee
- Auch das noch!
- ... aus dem Leben gegriffen
- Spaß muss sein
- Jetzt geht's rund
- Da bleibt kein Auge trocken
- Gnadenlos witzig
- Grobe Feinheiten
- Frei nach Schnauze!
- Ausgefallene Einfälle
- Das pralle Leben
- 2007 - Saustark (Aufzeichnung April 2007)
