= Andreas Rebers =

German comedian (born 1958)

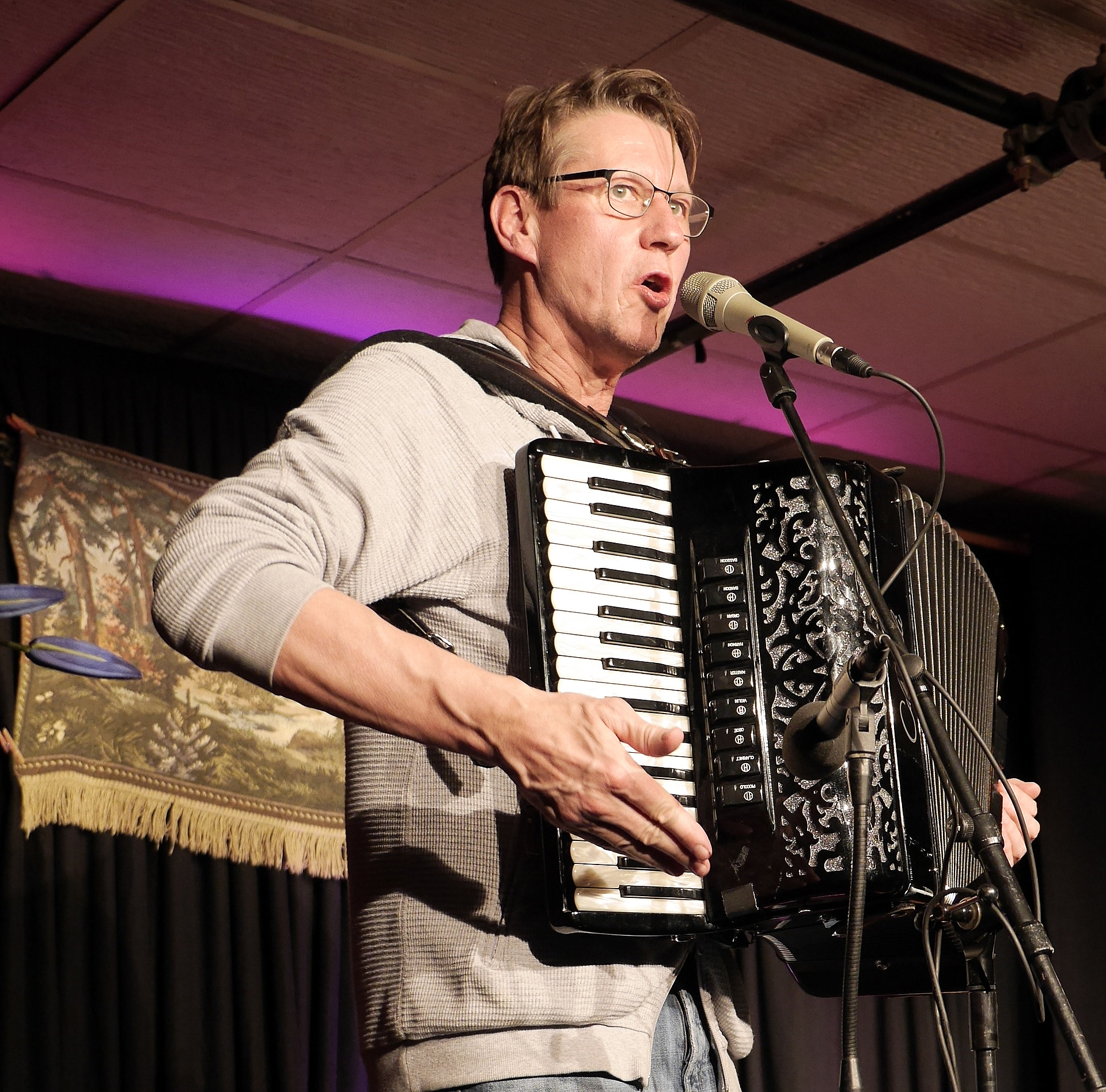
- Rebers in 2014
- Born: 7 January 1958; Westerbrak, West Germany
- Occupations: Kabarett artist author musician

Andreas Rebers (born 7 January 1958) is a Kabarett artist, author and musician from Munich. His shows often incorporate performances on the accordion or the piano.

== Early life ==
Rebers was born in Westerbrak in Lower Saxony. By the age of 15, Rebers' band Los Promillos which he founded with his brothers is a success in his local area of Weserbergland and brings him a certain degree of financial independence. After school, he successfully studied at the University of Hannover to become a teacher. It was also at the university where he made his first contacts to independent theaters and the art of Kabarett. After his first studies, he also earned a degree in pedagogy. He taught himself playing the piano and learned playing the accordion from Thomas Aßmus from 1984 to 1988, an instrument which he calls "Strapsmaus" and uses in his shows since then.

== Artistic career ==
From 1989 to 1997, Rebers was the director of plays at the Staatstheater Braunschweig. From 1997 to 1999 he was a member of the Lach- und Schießgesellschaft in Munich before starting a solo career.

Rebers often made guest appearance on various German Kabarett shows, such as Scheibenwischer, Neues aus der Anstalt or Ottfried Fischer's Ottis Schlachthof which exposed him to a larger audience and increased his popularity.

== Style ==
Rebers' Kabarett is musical in nature and relies on songs to bring his message across. He sees his music in the tradition of classical worker's songs like those composed by Bert Brecht. His style has been described as complicated and nasty satire which led to him being compared to Austrian Kabarett artist Josef Hader.

== Awards ==
- Wolfsburger Wolf (2000)
- Prix Pantheon: audience award Beklatscht & Ausgebuht (2003)
- Das große Kleinkunstfestival (2005)
- Sprungbrett (20068)
- Salzburger Stier (2006)
- Stern des Jahres of the Abendzeitung in the category Kabarett (2006)
- Deutscher Kleinkunstpreis in the category Kabarett (2008)
- Deutscher Kabarettpreis (2008)
- Dieter Hildebrandt Prize (2018)

== Releases ==
- Ich mag mich trotzdem (2000) ISBN 3-931780-75-9
- Ziemlich dicht (2002) ISBN 3-7857-1238-3
- Nebenan und nebenbei (2004) ISBN 3-7857-1460-2
- Lieber vom Fachmann (2007) ISBN 3-86604-712-6
