= Dieter Hildebrandt Prize =

Political cabaret award

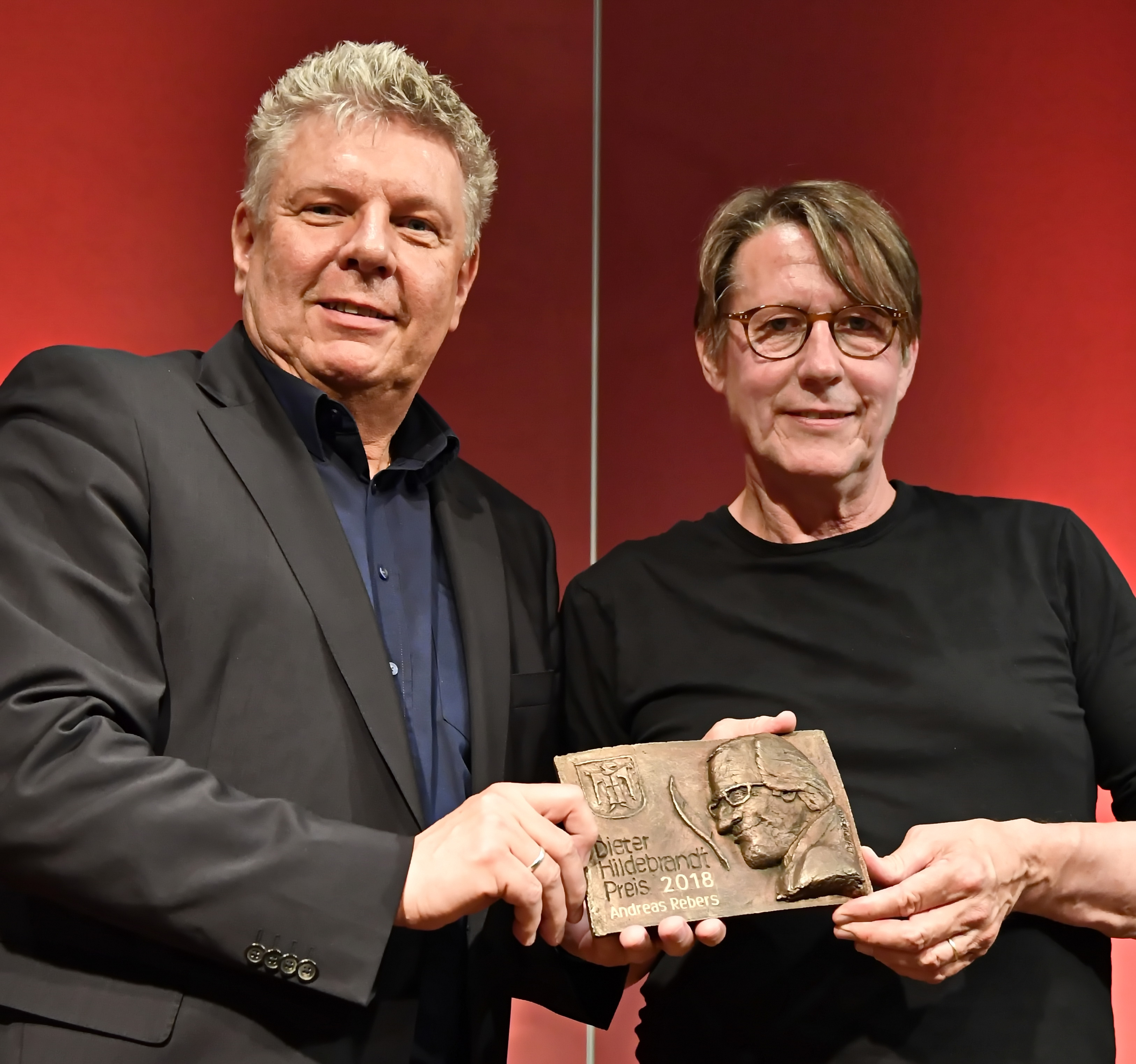
Munich's Lord Mayor Dieter Reiter (left) presents Andreas Rebers the 2018 Dieter Hildebrandt Prize.

The Dieter Hildebrandt Prize has been awarded by the city of Munich since 2016. The award honors German Kabarett artist Dieter Hildebrandt, who died in 2013. The annual prize honors ambitious political or decidedly socially critical cabaret. It is endowed with €10,000 and replaces the Cabaret Prize of the City of Munich. On proposal of a jury, the city council of Munich decides the winner.

== Recipients ==
- 2016: Claus von Wagner
- 2017: Josef Hader
- 2018: Andreas Rebers
- 2019: Christine Prayon
- 2020: Frank-Markus Barwasser
- 2021: Sarah Bosetti
- 2022: Severin Groebner
- 2023: Maren Kroymann
- 2024: Till Reiners
- 2025: Max Uthoff
