= Georg Schramm =

German Kabarett artist

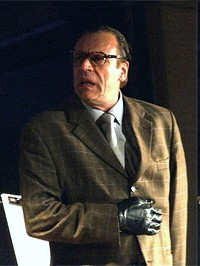
- Schramm as Lothar Dombrowski on stage in 2006
- Born: 11 March 1949 (age 77); Bad Homburg vor der Höhe, Germany
- Occupations: Kabarett artist, psychologist
- Website: georg-schramm.de

Georg Schramm (born 11 March 1949) is a German Kabarett artist. He was a host of the Kabarett shows Scheibenwischer and Neues aus der Anstalt.

== Biography ==
Schramm was born in Bad Homburg vor der Höhe. His father was a member of the Social Democratic Party of Germany (SPD) which influenced his later performances as a Kabarett artist. At his gymnasium (high school) he claims to have been the only working class child in his class. He then enlisted for the Bundeswehr as a short-term career soldier which he retired from as a reserve officer. Afterwards he studied psychology in Bochum and worked as a psychologist in a rehab clinic from 1976 to 1988. Since 1992 he has been working full-time as a Kabarett artist.

== Kabarett ==
Schramm never stars on the stage as himself but uses a range of different characters to speak their minds. Even if he stars on the stage as "Schramm", he only does so acting as a character of the same name. Most of the time he uses three characters for his performances:

Lothar Dombrowski
Dombrowski is a Prussian pensioner, disabled by a war and living in a retirement home. He is against any trends and funny comedy. Schramm uses this character to dish out coarse criticism of current events.
Oberstleutnant Sanftleben
An officer of the Bundeswehr, Schramm created this character based on his personal experience with the army. Sanftleben often comments on military and war related matters, for example the Iraq War and offers his personal insight on the reasons for those conflicts. Also, he shines a light on warlike aspects of the Great Recession.
August
August is a worker and SPD member from Hesse, talking in the typical dialect of that region. Coming from a social democratic background himself, Schramm uses August to both criticize the party from a member's perspective and to shield it from criticism. The character is partly modeled after Schramm's father.

Schramm is considered the most aggressive, outspoken and serious Kabarett artist of his time. In 2007, he published his first book, Lassen Sie es mich so sagen – Dombrowski deutet die Zeichen der Zeit, a compilation of texts from his shows from 1983–2007.

== Television ==
From 2000 to 2006 he was a regular guest in the Scheibenwischer which he co-hosted since 2003. He left the show on 24 April 2006 for reasons of conceptional and personal differences with fellow co-hosts Bruno Jonas and Mathias Richling. From 2007 to 2010 he co-hosted Neues aus der Anstalt with Urban Priol.

== Solo programs ==
- Solche Männer hat das Land
- Dein Platz an der Sonne
- Schlachtenbummler
- Ans Eingemachte – Best Of
- Mephistos Faust
- Thomas Bernhard hätte geschossen
- Meister Yodas Ende

== Awards ==
- Salzburger Stier (1990)
- Deutscher Kleinkunstpreis (1991)
- Leipziger Löwenzahn (1994)
- Deutscher Kabarettpreis (1999)
- Stern des Jahres from the Munich Abendzeitung in the category "Kabarett" (2005)
- Gaul von Niedersachsen (2001)
- Schweizer Kabarett-Preis Cornichon of the Oltner Kabarett-Tage (2005)
- Ehrenpreis Tegtmeiers Erben (2005)
- Deutscher Fernsehpreis for Beste Comedy (with Urban Priol) (2007)
- Bayerischer Kabarettpreis (2008)
- Erich Fromm Prize (2012)

== Bibliography ==
- Lassen Sie es mich so sagen – Dombrowski deutet die Zeichen der Zeit, München, Karl Blessing-Verlag, 2007, ISBN 3-89667-348-3, ISBN 978-3-89667-348-0
