= Richard Rogler =

German Kabarett artist (1949–2024)

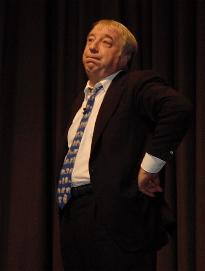
- Rogler on stage in 2001
- Born: 19 September 1949; Selb, Bavaria, West Germany
- Died: 11 August 2024 (aged 74)

Richard Rogler (19 September 1949 – 11 August 2024) was a German Kabarett artist and professor of Kabarett at the University of the Arts in Berlin.

== Early life ==
Rogler studied French and sport at the University of Würzburg. From 1974 to 1978 he was a member of the theater group "Ömnes & Oimel", first at Würzburg, then from 1977 in Cologne. From 1978 to 1982 he was a member of the duo "Der Wahre Anton" with Heinrich Pachl and from 1982 he had an engagement at the playhouse in Cologne.

== Professional career ==
Beginning in 1986, Rogler worked as a solo artist, starting with his first program "Freiheit aushalten!". Further solo programs were "Finish" (1992), "Wahnsinn" (1995), "Freiheit West" (1998), "Anfang offen" (2002), "Ewiges Leben" (2005) and "Stimmung" (2009).

In 1999, the university of the arts in Berlin established a visiting scholarship for Kabarett and Rogler was selected to hold this position.

== Television and radio ==
Rogler rose to prominence with several guest appearances on the Scheibenwischer and other TV and radio shows. For the WDR he hosted Mitternachtsspitzen from 1988 to 1992. In 1992 he produced and starred in a six-episode series entitled Herr Rogler und Herr Busse alongside Jochen Busse. Also from 1992 to 1994 he hosted Nachtschlag on Das Erste and then from 1997 to 2001 Roglers Freiheit on 3sat.

In 2006, Rogler became the third permanent member of the Scheibenwischer replacing Georg Schramm. After 2 years he departed the cast again in 2008.

== Style ==
Rogler's comedic style is described as old-school Kabarett and distinctly different from those of comedians. Unlike comedians, who usually cover all kinds of comical real life situations, Rogler comments almost exclusively on serious topics, mostly of a political nature, in a biting and outspoken as well as criticizing manner.

== Death ==
Rogler died on 11 August 2024, at the age of 74.

== Awards ==
- Deutscher Kleinkunstpreis (1982) (with Heinrich Pachl)
- Telestar (1987)
- Deutscher Kleinkunstpreis (1987)
- Adolf-Grimme-Preis (1989)
- Deutscher Kleinkunstpreis (1992)
- Morenhovener Lupe (1997)
- Deutscher Kabarettpreis (2000)
