= Cabaret in South Africa =

Cabaret in South Africa is a performance art form that blends music, theatre, and satire in addressing social, political, and cultural themes. Influenced by both the French cabaret artistique and the German Kabarett, South African cabaret is a distinctive genre, particularly within Afrikaans theatre.
