= Neues aus der Anstalt =

German television show

- Titlecard
- Genre: Political cabaret
- Presented by: Urban Priol (2007–2013); Georg Schramm (2007–2010); Frank-Markus Barwasser (2010–2013)
- Country of origin: Germany
- Original language: German

Production
- Producers: ZDF; RedSpider Networks
- Running time: 50 minutes

Original release
- Network: ZDF

Related
- Die Anstalt

Neues aus der Anstalt (English: "News from the (Mental) Institute") is a political cabaret program on German television station ZDF, hosted by Urban Priol and Frank-Markus Barwasser, who replaced Georg Schramm. Broadcast monthly from 2007 to 2013, it usually featured three guest cabaret artists in addition to the hosts.

After the program's surprise cancellation in 2013, it was resurrected in 2014 under the title Die Anstalt, replacing hosts Urban Priol and Frank-Markus Barwasser with Max Uthoff and Claus von Wagner.

== History ==
ZDF had not broadcast a political cabaret program since the cancellation of Notizen aus der Provinz with Dieter Hildebrandt in 1979, who, as a result, switched to the other German public broadcasting channel, Das Erste, where he created the Scheibenwischer.

Neues aus der Anstalt was first broadcast on 24 January 2007, when it aired just after heute journal.

== About the show ==
The show was broadcast live from Munich, one Tuesday evening a month. Its theme was a fictional psychiatric clinic where Priol acted as the head of medicine, while Schramm portrayed some of his characters as patients. Schramm's pensioner Lothar Dombrowski acted as the patients' spokesperson. He also appeared as the old Hessian social democrat August and the Bundeswehr officer Oberstleutnant Sanftleben ("Softlife"). Up to three guest artists portrayed other characters, either fellow patients or outside visitors, as well. Frank-Markus Barwasser in his alter ego Erwin Pelzig replaced Schramm as the co-host of the show in 2010.

Similar to Scheibenwischer, Neues aus der Anstalt strove to limit its content to political cabaret and did not feature other kinds of humor, such as stand-up or situational comedy. The German word Anstalt ("institute") is used for both mental institutions (Irrenanstalt, Nervenheilanstalt) and public broadcasting institutions (Rundfunkanstalt).

== Reception ==
The show surpassed Scheibenwischer's ratings by over a million viewers in its first episode. However the second episode was less successful. Ratings fell to the level of Scheibenwischer, although the show attracted a larger number of younger viewers, compared to the usual demographic of ZDF viewers. Although the ratings were lower than the first episode, they remained good, capturing a 13% market share (2.73 million per show) in its first year and stayed at that level.
