= Kabarett =

Satirical revue, form of cabaret

Kabarett (German pronunciation: [kabaˈʁɛt]; from French cabaret = tavern) is satirical revue, a form of cabaret which was developed in France by Rodolphe Salis in 1881 as the cabaret artistique. It was named Le Chat Noir and was centered on political events and satire. It later inspired creation of Kabarett venues in Germany from 1901, with the creation of Berlin's Überbrettl venue and in Austria with the creation of the Jung-Wiener Theater zum lieben Augustin housed in the Theater an der Wien. By the Weimar era in the mid-1920s it was characterized by political satire and gallows humor. It shared the characteristic atmosphere of intimacy with the French cabaret from which it was imported, but the gallows humor was a distinct German aspect.

== Difference from other forms ==
Kabarett is the German word for the French word cabaret but has two different meanings. The first meaning is the same as in English, describing a form of entertainment featuring comedy, song, dance, and theatre (often the word "cabaret" is used in German for this as well to distinguish this form). The latter describes a kind of political satire. Unlike comedians who make fun of all kinds of things, Kabarett artists (German: Kabarettisten) pride themselves as dedicated almost completely to political and social topics of more serious nature which they criticize using techniques like cynicism, sarcasm and irony.

== History ==
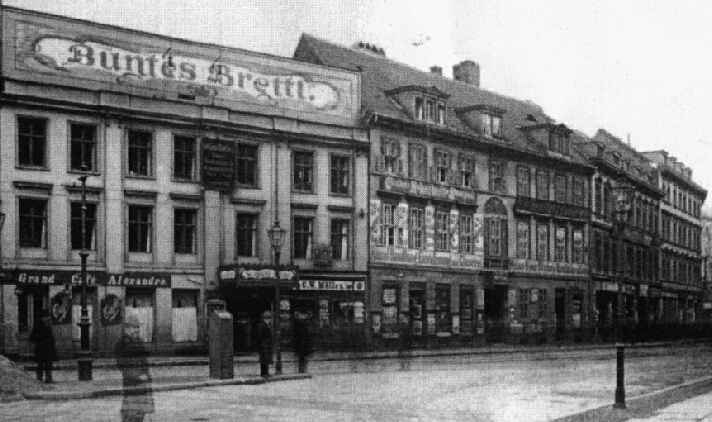
Überbrettl

The first Kabarett venue was the Le Chat Noir in France, founded in 1880 by Rodolphe Salis. It later inspired similar venues in Germany and Austria such as the "Überbrettl", the first Kabarett venue (Berlin, 1901) in Germany and the "Jung-Wiener Theater zum lieben Augustin" in Vienna.

Ernst von Wolzogen founded in Berlin the first German cabaret called Überbrettl (literally Superstage, a play of words on Friedrich Nietzsche's Übermensch, Superman), later known as Buntes Theater (colourful theatre), in January 1901. In the foundation of the Überbrettl , von Wolzogen was inspired by Otto Julius Bierbaum's 1897 novel Stilpe.

In Munich, the Die Elf Scharfrichter was co-founded by Otto Falckenberg and others, in April 1901. It is sometimes considered the first political kabarett.

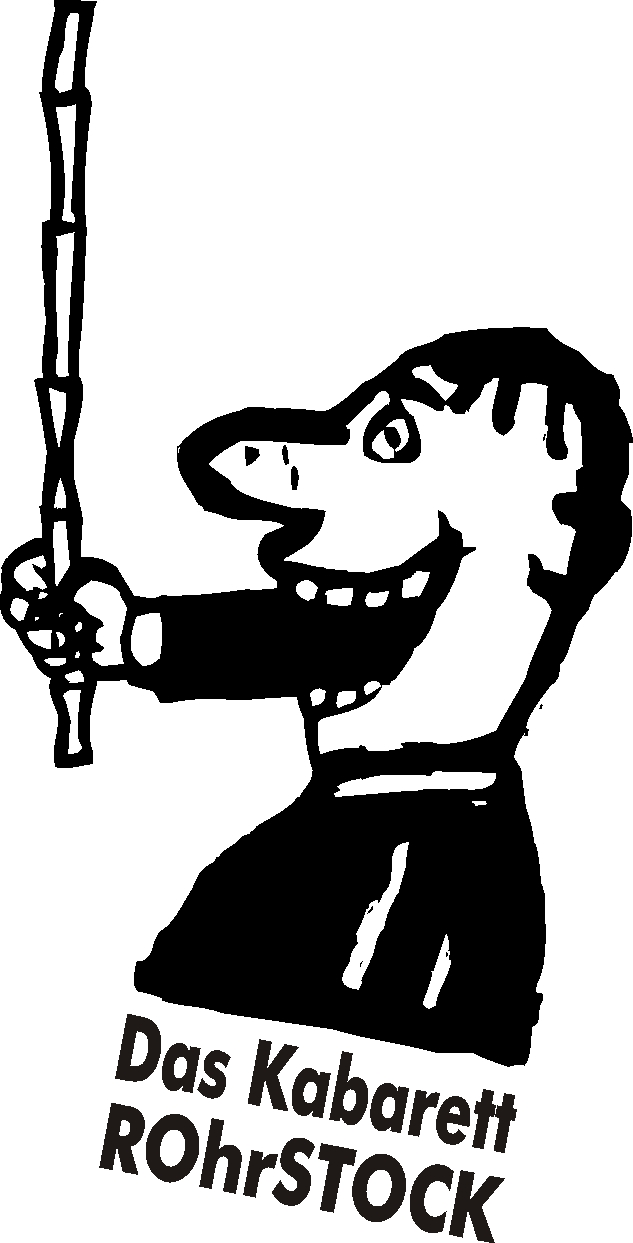
Kabarett ROhrSTOCK

All forms of public criticism were banned by a censor on theatres in the German Empire, however. This was lifted at the end of the First World War, allowing the kabarett artists to deal with social themes and political developments of the time. This meant that German kabarett really began to blossom in the 1920s and 1930s, bringing forth all kinds of new cabaret artists, such as Werner Finck at the Katakombe, Karl Valentin (died 1948) at the Wien-München, Fritz Grünbaum and Karl Farkas at the Kabarett Simpl in Vienna, and Claire Waldoff. Some of their texts were written by great literary figures such as Kurt Tucholsky, Erich Kästner, and Klaus Mann.

When the Nazi party came to power in 1933, they started to repress this intellectual criticism of the times. Kabarett in Germany was hit badly. (Kander and Ebb's Broadway musical, Cabaret, based on the Christopher Isherwood novel, Goodbye to Berlin, deals with this period.) In 1935 Werner Finck was briefly imprisoned and sent to a concentration camp; at the end of that year Kurt Tucholsky committed suicide; and nearly all German-speaking kabarett artists fled into exile in Switzerland, France, Scandinavia, or the United States.

When the war ended, the occupying powers ensured that the kabarett portrayed the horrors of the Nazi regime. Soon, various kabarett shows were also dealing with the government, the Cold War and the Wirtschaftswunder: Cabaret Ulenspiegel in Berlin, the university cabaret Tol(l)leranten in Mainz, the Kom(m)ödchen in Düsseldorf and the Münchner Lach- und Schießgesellschaft in Munich. These were followed in the 1950s by television cabaret.

In the GDR, the first state kabarett stage was opened in 1953, Berlin's Die Distel. It was censored and had to be very careful in criticizing the state (1954: Die Pfeffermühle in Leipzig).

In the 1960s, West German kabarett was centred on Düsseldorf, Munich, and Berlin. At the end of the decade, the students' movement of May 1968 split opinion on the genre as some old kabarett artists were booed off the stage for being part of the old establishment. In the 1970s, new forms of kabarett developed, such as the television show Notizen aus der Provinz. At the end of the 1980s, kabarett was an important part of social criticism, with a minor boom at the time of German reunification. In eastern Germany, kabarett artists had been growing more and more daring in their criticism of politicians in the time leading up to 1989. After reunification, new social problems, such as mass unemployment, the privatization of companies, and rapid changes in society, meant that cabarets rose in number. Dresden, for example, gained two new cabarets alongside the popular Herkuleskeule.

In the 1990s and at the start of the new millennium, the television and film comedy boom and a lessening of public interest in politics meant that television kabarett audiences in Germany dropped. In order to increase interest again the Walk of Fame of Cabaret in Mainz is honoring selected cabaret celebrities; many past cabaret celebrities are honored by stars and each year a star for a living one is added.

As of 1999, contemporary active political kabarettists and satirists in Germany include: Urban Priol, Thomas Reis, Arnulf Rating, Heinrich Pachl, 3 Gestirn Köln 1, Bruno Jonas, Richard Rogler, Mathias Richling, Dieter Hildebrandt (died 2013), Henning Venske, Matthias Beltz (died 2002), Matthias Deutschmann and Volker Pispers.

== Other notable Kabarett artists ==
- Willy Astor
- Jürgen Becker
- Konrad Beikircher
- Martin Betz
- Gerhard Bronner, died 2007
- Karl Dall, died 2020
- Alfred Dorfer
- Gerd Dudenhöffer
- Max Ehrlich, died 1944
- Karl Farkas, died 1971
- Ottfried Fischer
- Lisa Fitz
- Egon Friedell, died 1938
- Andreas Giebel
- Rainald Grebe
- Christoph Grissemann
- Fritz Grünbaum, died 1941
- Günter Grünwald
- Josef Hader
- Dieter Hallervorden
- Peter Hammerschlag, died 1942
- Eckart von Hirschhausen
- Franz Hohler
- Jörg Hube, died 2009
- Hanns Dieter Hüsch, died 2005
- Georg Kreisler, died 2011
- Reiner Kröhnert
- Maren Kroymann
- Frank Lüdecke
- Uwe Lyko
- Rolf Miller
- Wolfgang Neuss, died 1989
- Maria Ney, died 1959
- Michael Niavarani
- Dieter Nuhr
- Günther Paal
- Rainer Pause
- Erwin Pelzig
- Sissi Perlinger
- Gerhard Polt
- Andreas Rebers
- Lukas Resetarits
- Hagen Rether
- Mathias Richling
- Helmut Schleich
- Wilfried Schmickler
- Werner Schneyder, died 2019
- Georg Schramm
- Horst Schroth
- Christoph Sieber
- Serdar Somuncu
- Emil Steinberger
- Dirk Stermann
- Ludger Stratmann
- Brother Theodore
- Mathias Tretter
- Max Uthoff
- Claus von Wagner
- Bodo Wartke
- Sigi Zimmerschied

== Notable Kabarett shows and venues ==
- Cabaret Ulenspiegel (Berlin)
- Herkuleskeule (Dresden)
- Kom(m)ödchen (Düsseldorf)
- Mitternachtsspitzen (Cologne)
- Münchner Lach- und Schießgesellschaft (Munich)
- Neues aus der Anstalt
- Notizen aus der Provinz
- Pantheon-Theater (Bonn)
- Scheibenwischer
- Science Busters (Vienna)
- Tol(l)leranten (Mainz)

== See also ==
- Walk of Fame of Cabaret
