= Urban Priol =

German Kabarett artist and comedian (born 1961)

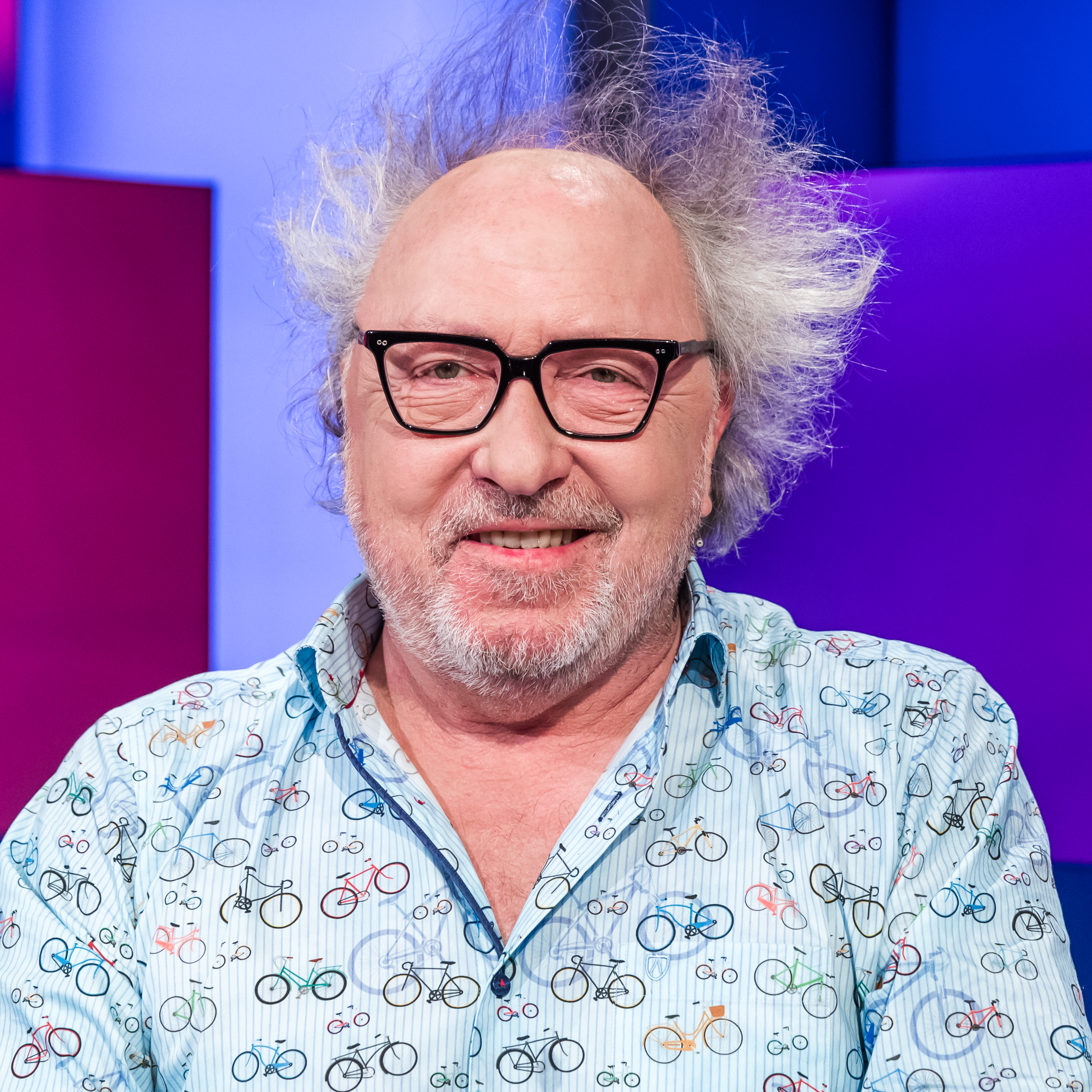
- Priol in 2026
- Born: 14 May 1961 (age 64); Aschaffenburg, Bavaria, West Germany
- Occupations: Kabarett artist and comedian

Urban Priol (born 14 May 1961) is a German Kabarett artist and comedian.

== Life ==
Urban Priol was born on 14 May 1961, in Aschaffenburg. He spent his childhood in Obernburg am Main. In 1980, he made his abitur at the Kronberg-Gymnasium Aschaffenburg. After his studies at the Würzburg University he began teacher training with the subjects of English, Russian, and history, but he did not finish. In 1988, he was co-founder (artistic director) of the ‘’Kleinkunstbühne Obernburg’’. Since 1998, he is the owner of the Kabarett im Hofgarten. Since May 2009, Priol is a member of the globalization-critical network Attac.

== Cabaret ==
Priol made his first stage performances already in 1982. In his first own TV show Everything Must Go (3sat, 2004–2007), he offered a stage for three to four guests from the cabaret scene. On 3 August 2006, a 45-minute excerpt from Priols program daily fresh as part of the series summer solo was broadcast by the ZDF. Besides Priols program the ZDF presented among others Rüdiger Hoffmann, Bülent Ceylan and Eckart von Hirschhausen.

== Neues aus der Anstalt ==
Priol presented the political cabaret program Neues aus der Anstalt for nearly seven years. The show premiered in January 2007 and was co-hosted by Georg Schramm until June 2010. Schramm was replaced by Frank-Markus Barwasser alias Erwin Pelzig. On 26 June 2013 Priol and Barwasser announced their withdrawal from the program.

== Awards ==
- 2007: Deutscher Fernsehpreis for Neues aus der Anstalt, together with Georg Schramm
- 2013: Das große Kleinkunstfestival Berlin-Preis
