= Werner Schneyder =

Austrian caberet performer, writer, actor, stage director, television presenter

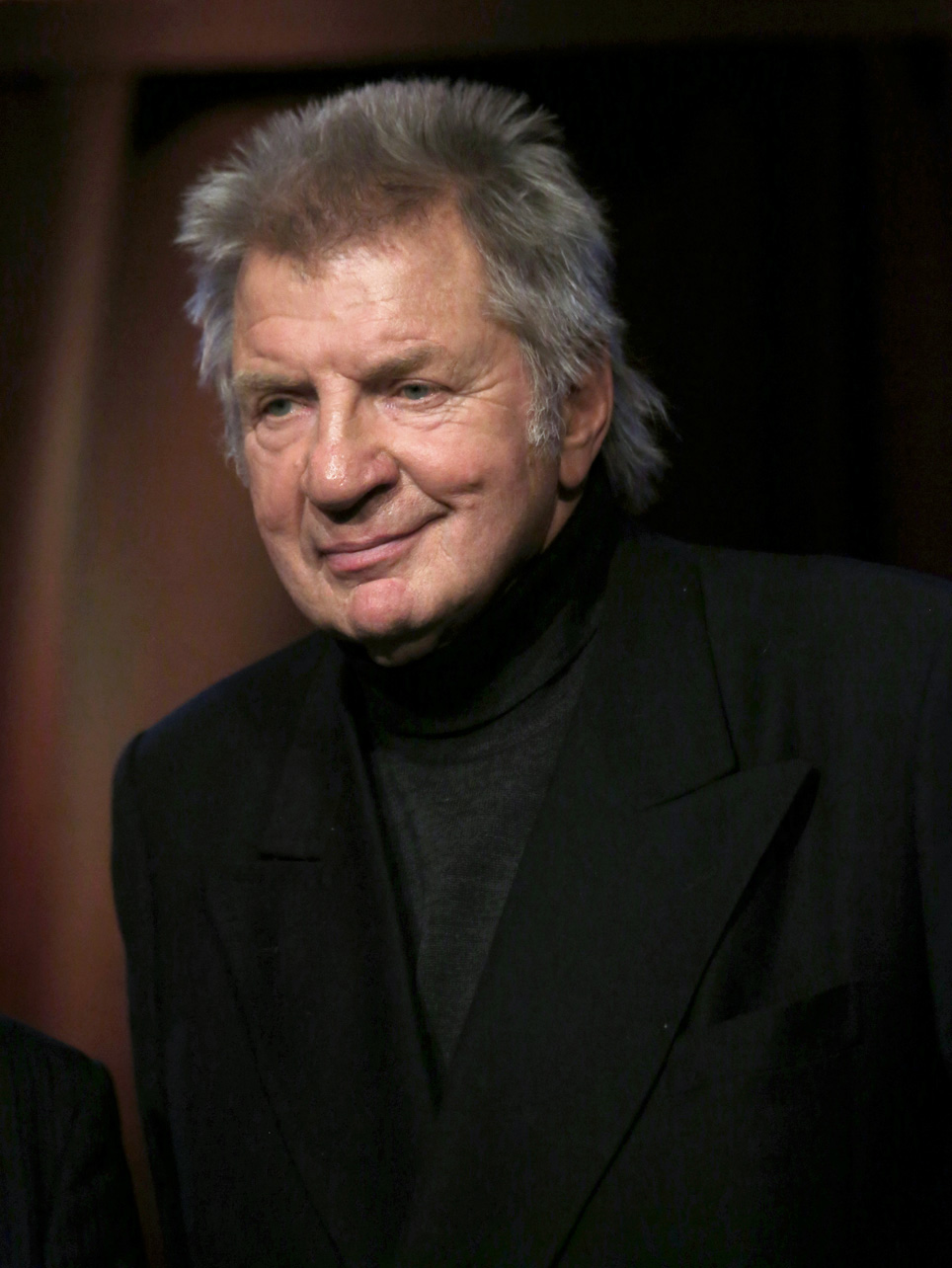
- Schneyder in 2012
- Born: 25 January 1937; Graz, Austria
- Died: 2 March 2019 (aged 82); Vienna, Austria
- Occupations: Kabarett performer; Journalist; Writer; Actor; Theatre director; Television presenter; Sports reporter
- Awards: Johann Nestroy Ring; Bayerischer Kabarettpreis; Walk of Fame of Cabaret; Austrian Decoration for Science and Art

Werner Schneyder (25 January 1937 – 2 March 2019) was an Austrian kabarett performer, journalist, writer, actor, stage director, television presenter and sports reporter. He performed political kabarett with Dieter Hildebrandt from 1974 to 1982, with an extra program presented in Leipzig, then in the GDR, in 1985. He moderated das aktuelle sportstudio on ZDF from 1975, and a series about boxing for RTL from 1992 to 1999. He described himself as a Universaldilettant (all-round amateur).

== Life and career ==
Schneyder was born in Graz. His father came from Vienna, and his mother from Karlsbad. He grew up in Klagenfurt. Schneyder studied publicism (Publizistikwissenschaft) and art history in Vienna from 1954, and worked at the same time as a freelance journalist for sports and local news, and as a singer in bars. After earning a PhD, he wrote for advertising agencies and was a dramaturge at the Salzburger Landestheater from 1962, then for the Landestheater Linz. He was a freelance writer from 1965, writing and directing radio features and working for newspapers.

Schneyder lived in Vienna and at the Millstätter See. He was married to his wife Ilse from 1961 to 2005, when she died of cancer. Their son Achim (born in Salzburg in 1964) became a writer and journalist. Schneyder married Regine Bulling in Spittal an der Drau in 2011. Schneyder was found dead in his home in Vienna on 2 March 2019. He was cremated at Feuerhalle Simmering, his ashes are buried in Vienna Central Cemetery.

=== Kabarett ===
In 1973, Kurt Weinzierl saw Schneyder, and recommended him as a partner for Dieter Hildebrandt, whose political kabarett Münchner Lach- und Schießgesellschaft had been dissolved the previous year. They formed a duo in April 1974 and presented five programs in eight years: Talk täglich, Lametta & Co., Wie abgerissen, Keine Fragen mehr, Ende der Spielzeit. They performed together until 1982. They appeared once more in 1985, presenting in an already unstable GDR the program Zugabe Leipzig (Leipzig encore).

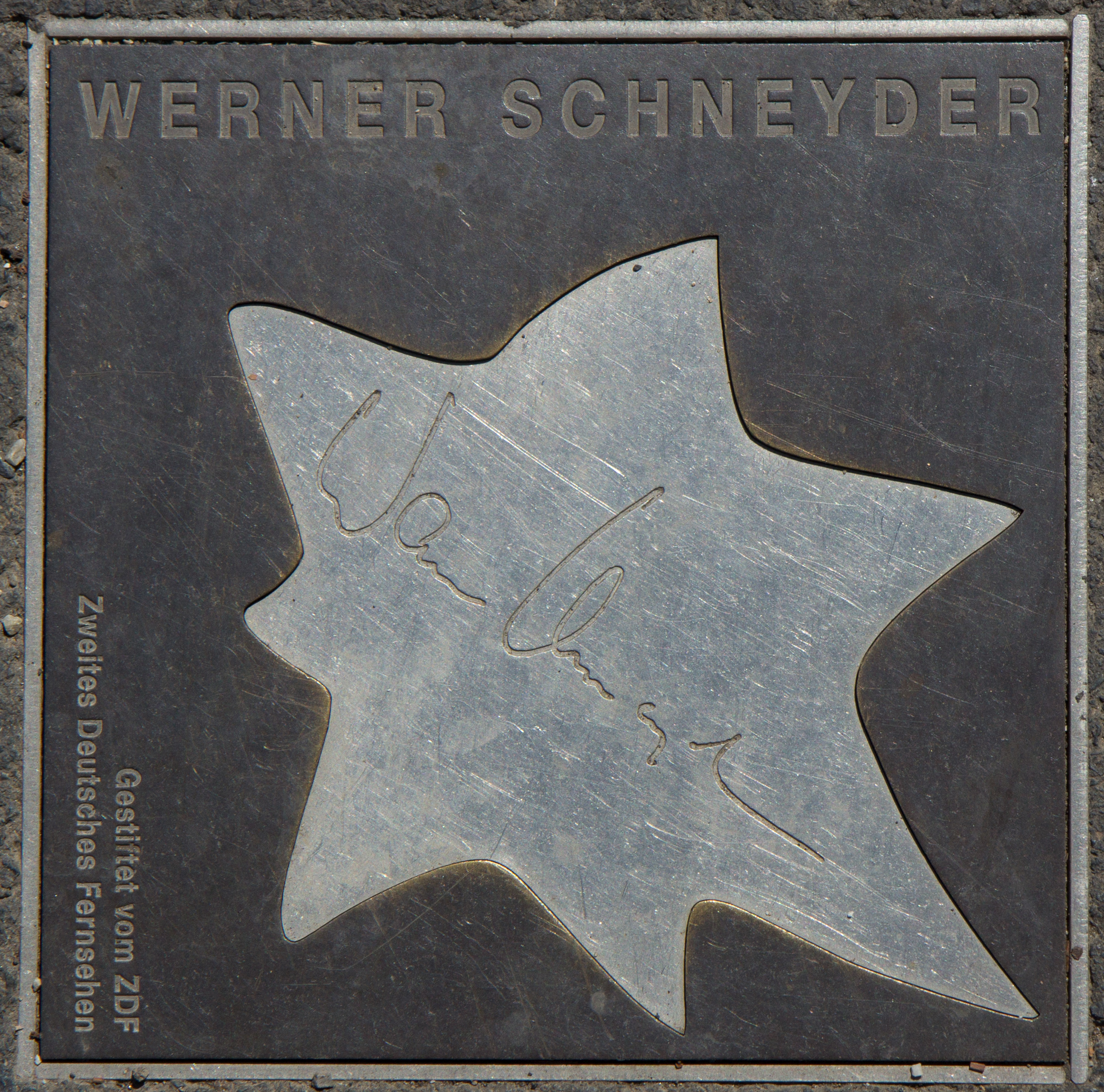
Schneyder's star in the Mainz Walk of Fame of Cabaret, No. 60

Schneyder appeared a final time on 25 January 2017, his 80th birthday, playing Das war's von mir at the Akademietheater of the Vienna Burgtheater.

=== Literature ===
Schneyder wrote aphorisms, short stories (Erzählungen), poems and satire. He wrote a literary portrait of Erich Kästner, Erich Kästner – ein brauchbarer Autor, in 1982. He published poems in Reimzeit (time for rhyming) and essays titled Ansichten eines Solisten.

=== Sports ===
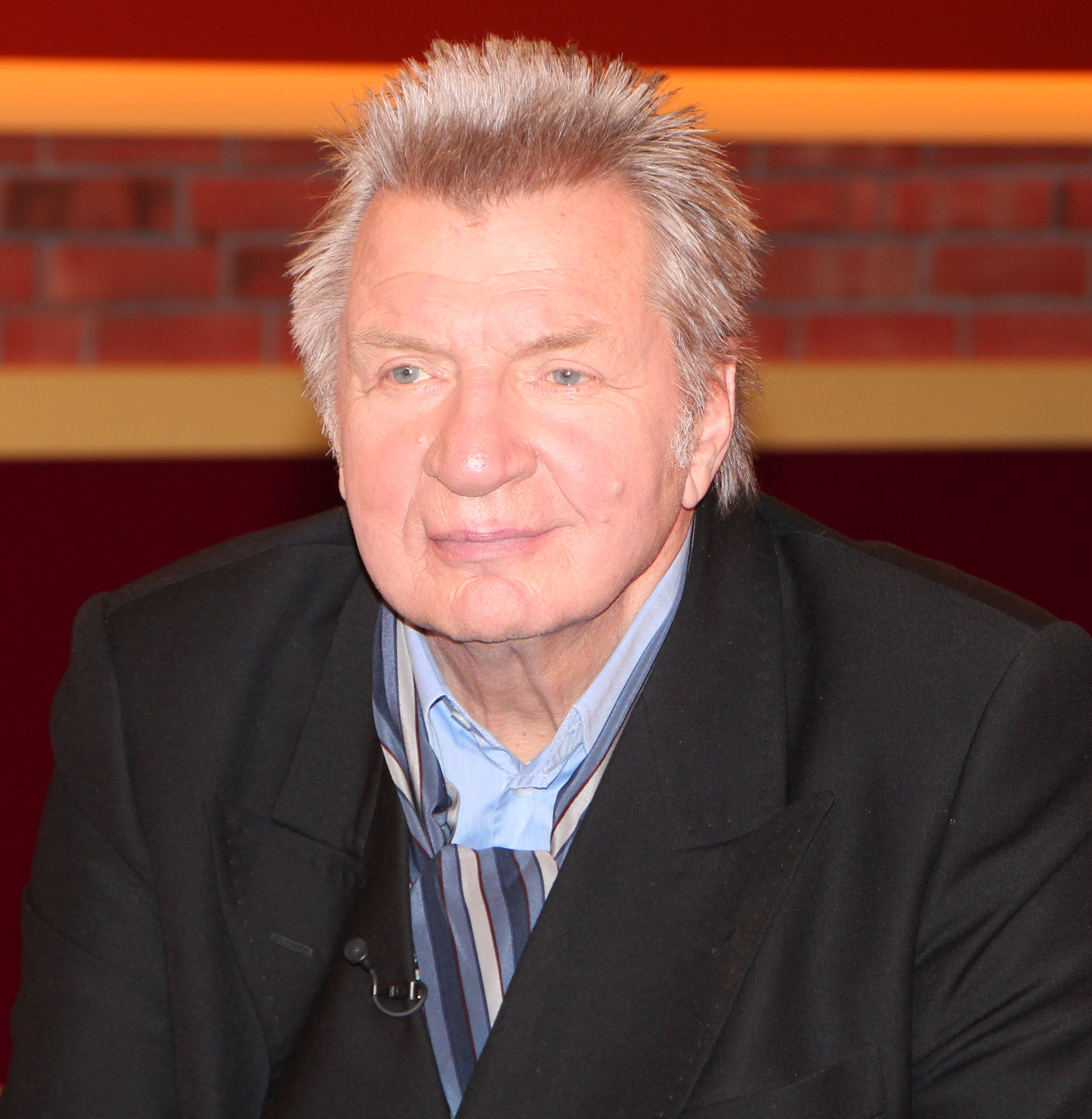
Schneyder in 2011, in a TV talk show with Markus Lanz

Schneyder was a sports journalist from the time he was a student. When he worked in kabarett, he had contacts to the television station ZDF, resulting in a position as moderator of das aktuelle sportstudio from 1975. Beginning with the 1984 Summer Olympics in Los Angeles, he commentated on boxing at the Olympics on ZDF, also from the 1988 games in Seoul and the 1992 games in Barcelona. From 1992 to 1999, he commented on boxing for RTL. During his years with Hildebrandt, he was goalkeeper for the FC Schmiere, a football team of the kabarett, and small theatre scene of that time.

== Awards ==
Schneyder received the Johann Nestroy Ring of Vienna in 1981, the Deutscher Kabarettpreis, the Bayerischer Kabarettpreis (Ehrenpreis) in 2008, the star of satire on the Walk of Fame of Cabaret in Berlin also in 2008, the Salzburger Lebensstier for his life achievements in 2010, the "Großes Verdienstzeichen" of Land Wien in 2005, the Goldener Rathausmann of Vienna, and the Austrian Decoration for Science and Art in 2012.

== Publications ==
- Empfehlung der einfachen Schläge. Europaverlag, Vienna and Munich, 1973, ISBN 3-203-50454-5.
- Die Vermeidung von Rückschlägen. Europaverlag, ISBN 3-203-50579-7.
- Die Unternehmungen des Herrn Hans. Roman. Europaverlag, ISBN 3-203-50596-7.
- Vom Nachlassen der Schlagkraft. Europaverlag, 1979, ISBN 3-203-50701-3.
- ... über Sport. Dabeisein ist gar nichts. Bucher, Lucerne 1980, ISBN 3-7658-0335-9.
- Gelächter vor dem Aus. Aphorismen, Epigramme. Kindler, Munich, 1980, ISBN 3-463-00792-4.
- Erich Kästner. Ein brauchbarer Autor. Kindler, 1982, ISBN 3-463-00844-0.
- Schlafen Sie gut, Herr Tucholsky! Kindler, 1983, ISBN 3-463-00864-5.
- Satz für Satz. Ein Kabarettsolo mit Fußnoten. Knaur paperback, Munich, 1984, ISBN 3-426-02135-8.
- Wut und Liebe. Gesammelte Ansichten. Kindler, 1985, ISBN 3-463-40008-1.
- Abschied vom Karpfen. Erzählungen. Kindler, 1986, ISBN 3-463-40034-0.
- Ende der Sommerpause. Kindler, 1988, ISBN 3-463-40095-2.
- Herz im Hirn. Lyrik, Aphorismen und Prosa. Henschelverlag, Berlin 1988, ISBN 3-362-00126-2.
- Das Gefährliche an der Kunst. Erzählungen. Kindler, 1991, ISBN 3-426-40173-8.
- Reimzeit. Kremayr & Scheriau, Wien 1995, ISBN 3-218-00609-0.
- Selberdenken ist auch eine Möglichkeit. Im Gespräch mit Gunna Wendt. Herder, Freiburg im Breisgau 1996, ISBN 3-451-04412-9.
- Schreibzeit. Kremayr & Scheriau, Vienna, 1996, ISBN 3-218-00620-1.
- Zeitspiel. Kremayr & Scheriau, 1997, ISBN 3-218-00631-7.
- with Hans Riehl: Ketzereien zur Zeitenwende. Europaverlag, 1997, ISBN 3-203-82517-1.
- Meiningen oder Die Liebe und das Theater. Ein Bericht. Kremayr & Scheriau, 1998, ISBN 3-218-00657-0.
- Karrieren oder Das letzte Drittel entscheidet. Erzählungen. Kremayr & Scheriau, 2000, ISBN 3-218-00674-0.
- Ansichten eines Solisten. Wortmeldungen und Nachreden. Kremayr & Scheriau, 2002, ISBN 3-218-00700-3. Als Hörbuch: Komplett-Media (2CDs), ISBN 3-8312-6005-2.
- Ich, Werner Schneyder: Meine 12 Leben. Amalthea, Vienna, 2006, ISBN 3-85002-566-7.
- Krebs. Eine Nacherzählung. Langen Müller, Munich, 2008, ISBN 978-3-7844-3127-7.
- Die Socken des Kritikers. Ausgewählte Erzählungen. Langen Müller, 2009, ISBN 978-3-7844-3170-3. as audio book: Herbig (2CDs), ISBN 978-3-7844-4205-1.
- Manchmal gehen mir meine Meinungen auf die Nerven. Aber ich habe keine anderen. Langen Müller, 2011, ISBN 978-3-7844-3253-3.
- Partner, Paare, Paarungen. Erzählungen. Langen Müller, 2012, ISBN 978-3-7844-3286-1.
- Von einem, der auszog, politisch zu werden. Westend-Verlag, Frankfurt (Main) 2014, ISBN 978-3-86489-065-9.
- Gespräch unter zwei Augen. Dialog eines Lebens. Amalthea, 2016, ISBN 978-3990500576.

== Recordings ==
=== LPs ===
Recordings by Schneyder are held by the German National Library, including:

- Talk täglich, with Dieter Hildebrandt. Telefunken 1975. OCLC 724243167
- Private Lieder, Mandragora 1980. OCLC 220226972
- Schlafen Sie gut, Herr Tucholsky! Alpha 1982. OCLC 725175719
- Querschnitte aus fünf Programmen (1974–1982), with Hildebrandt. Musikant 1982. OCLC 724760391
- Zeitgenossen, haufenweise. Werner Schneyder & Lore Lorentz singen Erich Kästner. Amaton 1984. OCLC 725082136
- Live. Pläne 1985. OCLC 180539864

=== CDs ===
- Zeitgenossen, haufenweise. Werner Schneyder liest Erich Kästner. Preiser 1999. OCLC 313734579
- Die Kabarettlegende 1: Talk täglich/Lametta & Co, with Hildebrandt. Preiser 1999. OCLC 887617686
- Die Kabarettlegende 2: Wie abgerissen/Keine Fragen mehr, with Hildebrandt. Preiser 2000. OCLC 808083928
- Die Kabarettlegende 3: Ende der Spielzeit, with Hildebrandt. Preiser 2000. OCLC 808083926
- Reimzeit. Werner Schneyder liest Werner Schneyder. Preiser 2001. OCLC 314154598
- Ich bin konservativ. Live aus der Leipziger Pfeffermühle. Chromart Classics 2012. OCLC 827005651
- "Zugabe Leipzig". Auftritt in der Leipziger Pfeffermühle am 9. Januar 1985, with Hildebrandt. Herbig 2013. OCLC 864474463
