= Bosetti =

Bosetti is a surname. Notable people with the surname include:

- Alexy Bosetti (born 1993), French footballer
- Caterina Bosetti (born 1994), Italian volleyball player
- Giulio Bosetti (1930–2009), Italian actor and actor
- Hermine Bosetti (1875–1936), German coloratura soprano
- Katarina Bosetti-Kristoffersson (born 1979), Swedish politician
- Rick Bosetti (born 1953), American baseball player
- Sarah Bosetti (born 1984), German poet, author and satirical comedian
