= Jürgen Becker =

Jürgen Becker may refer to:

- Jürgen Becker (comedian) (born 1959), German comedian
- Jürgen Becker (poet) (1932–2024), German poet and prose writer
