= Claus von Wagner =

German cabaret performer (born 1977)

Claus Joachim von Wagner
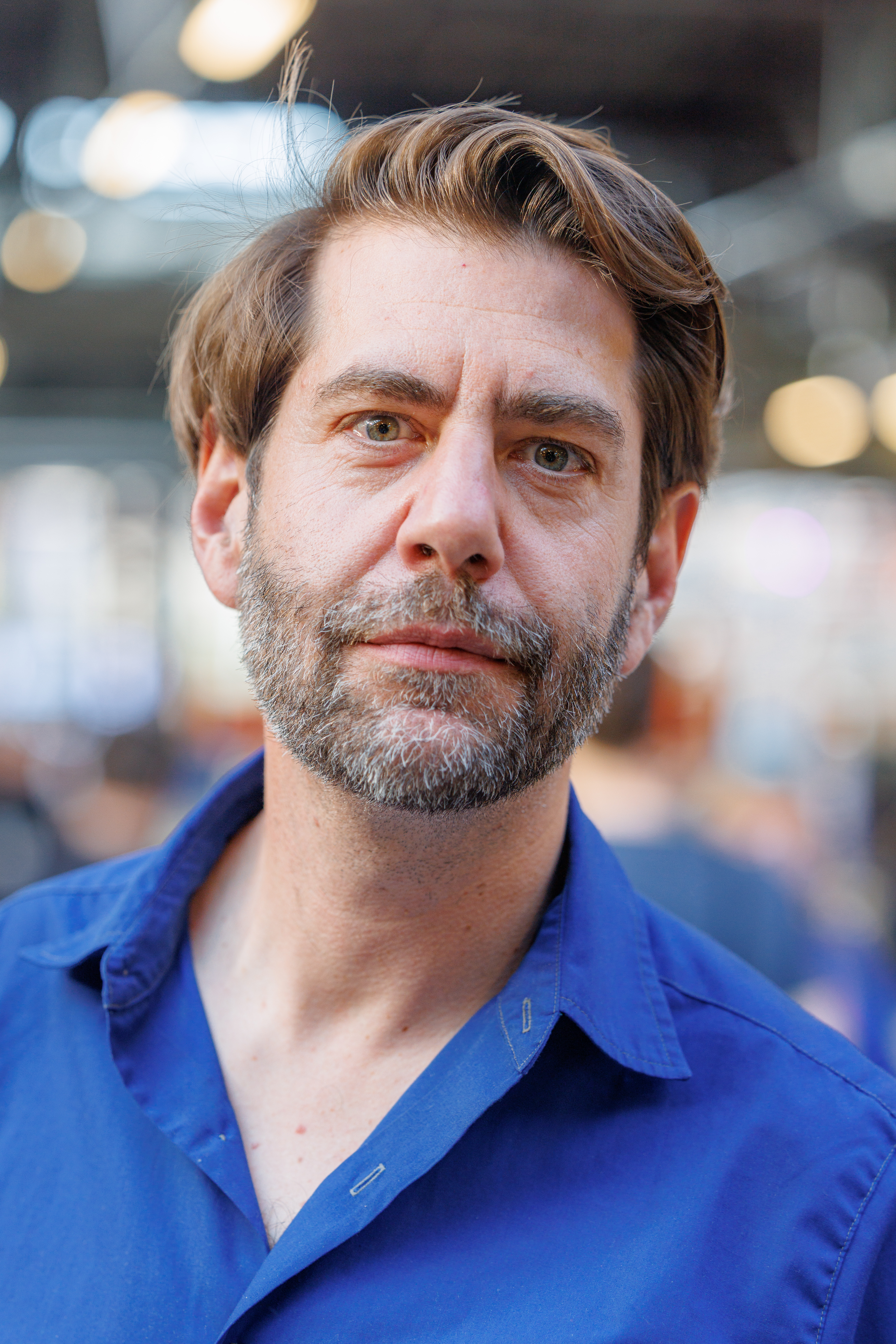
- Claus von Wagner in 2026
- Born: Claus Joachim von Wagner; 28 November 1977 (age 48); Munich, Bavaria, West Germany
- Occupations: Kabarett artist Television presenter

Claus von Wagner (born 28 November 1977) is a German Kabarett artist, a stand-up observational comic and political satirist.

== Early life ==
Born in Munich, von Wagner grew up in Miesbach, southeast of Munich. His father, originally from Prussia, was a lawyer, while his mother was a housewife. After completing his final school exams, he pursued studies in Communications Sciences, Modern History, and Media Law at LMU Munich. In 2003, he graduated with a degree of "Magister Artium." The subject of his master's thesis was "Political cabaret on German television. Between social criticism and self-promotion. An expert survey." Prior to and during his university studies, he set up his first "Kabaret" show, "Warten auf Majola", which premiered in 1997.

In 2012 he joined the German TV show heute-show. In 2014, he co-hosted the popular television political satire Kabarett program, Die Anstalt alongside Max Uthoff.^{[4]} Additionally, from 2004 to 2014, he was a member of the First German Forced Ensemble, a trio that included Mathias Tretter and Philipp Weber.

== Awards ==
- 2016 Dieter Hildebrandt Prize

== Personal ==
Claus von Wagner lives in Munich and has a daughter.
