= Überbrettl =

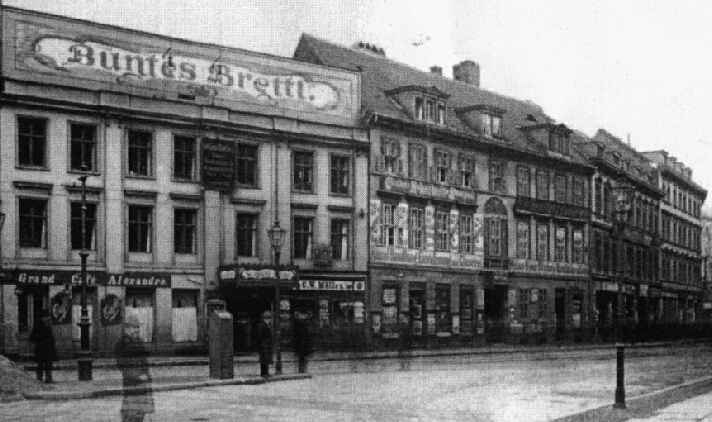
Überbrettl in 1901 on Alexanderstraße

Überbrettl (German pronunciation: [ˈʔyːbɐˌbʁɛtl̩]; English: lit. 'Overboard') was the first venue in Germany for literary cabaret, or Kabarett, founded 1901 in Berlin by Ernst von Wolzogen. The German Kabarett concept was imported from French venues like Le Chat Noir in Paris, from which it kept the characteristic atmosphere of intimacy. But the German type developed its own peculiarities, most prominently its characteristic gallows humour.

== History ==
The distinct cabaret atmosphere was sketched by Otto Julius Bierbaum in his 1897 novel Stilpe, which inspired Wolzogen in the foundation of the Überbrettl. He chose the initial name both to parody Friedrich Nietzsche's Übermensch concept and also to signal his intent go "above and beyond" (über) the local Brettl (slang: "[stage]board") variety shows and even the French literary cabaret.

The venue opened in a former theatre on 18 January 1901 on Alexanderstraße No. 40, vis-à-vis the Alexanderplatz police headquarters. Victor Hollaender, the father of Friedrich Hollaender, served as musical director, temporarily superseded by Arnold Schoenberg, with Oscar Straus as chief composer. Performances included parodies written by Christian Morgenstern and the one-act play Episode by Arthur Schnitzler. They soon became very popular entailing the establishment of numerous Kabarett venues all over Berlin.

However, economical difficulties arose in the same year, when Wolzogen established another venue, the Buntes Theater ("colourful theatre"), in the Kreuzberg quarter. The great hall was lavishly decorated in an Art Nouveau style by August Endell, nevertheless the extensive costs combined with the remote location turned out to be fatal. In 1902 Wolzogen retired and the stage performances concentrated on trivial comedies. From 1909 onwards, the rooms were used by the Freie Volksbühne theatre company.
