= Hagen Rether =

Romanian-born German political cabaret artist and musician

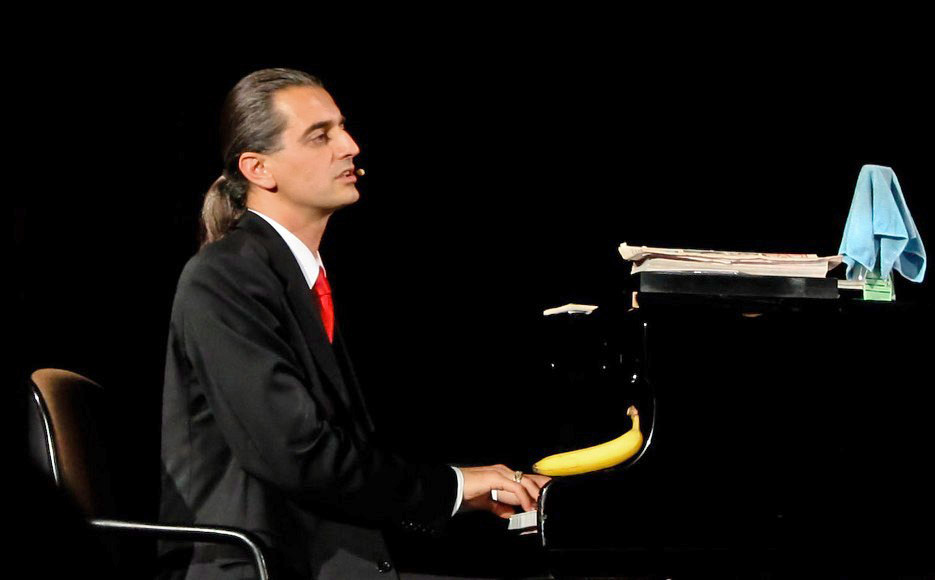
- Hagen Rether in 2008
- Born: 8 October 1969 (age 56); Bucharest, Romania

Comedy career
- Medium: Kabarett
- Genres: Observational comedy, Word play, Political satire, Black comedy
- Subjects: German culture, German and American politics, Religion, Mass media, Globalization
- Website: www.hagenrether.de

Hagen Rether (born 8 October 1969 in Bucharest) is a Romanian-born German political cabaret artist and musician. The most remarkable features in his performance are usually the presence and use of a grand piano. He was a frequent contributor to the German Kabarett TV show Scheibenwischer.

Among the topics Rether relates to are not only federal, state and international politics, but also religion, media, consumerism and globalization.

== Biography ==
Hagen Rether spent his early childhood in Bucharest and Sibiu, Romania as the son of German, Transylvanian Saxon parents of Siebenbürgen. In 1973, his family relocated to West Germany settling in Freiburg im Breisgau. He began studying the piano at eight years of age and attended the Folkwang Hochschule in Essen, where he still lives today (2008).

Prior to touring with his solo show, he was the pianist in Ludger Stratmann's show as well as performing with other artists. Since 2003 he has presented his show "Liebe" (en.: Love), which he constantly updates and varies according to the contemporary requirements of every performance.

His show is predominantly political. Sometimes he begins by eating a cup of yoghurt. Throughout much of the show he alternates or accompanies his monologue with the piano modifying song selection, tempo and style according to the topic he is about to cover.

Important targets for his satires and biting ironies are, among many others, the Catholic Church, George W. Bush and the German novelist and Nobel Prize winner Günter Grass, whom he criticized for not admitting that he was a member of the Waffen-SS as a teenager. Another target is German pop singer Herbert Grönemeyer, who he alleges for commercially exploiting his own wife's death in his songs.

Using parody, he targets historical and contemporary people using political and medial transcripts for his satires (e.g. Jürgen Rüttgers).

== Awards and honors ==
- 2003
  - Fohlen von Niedersachsen (en., approximately: The Lower Saxony Colt awarded by TAK Hannover)
  - Tegtmeiers Erben (an award in memory of a local North Rhine-Westphalia-based persona by German comedian and cabaret artist Jürgen von Manger)
- 2004
  - Stuttgarter Besen in Gold
  - Prix Pantheon - Jurypreis Frühreif & Verdorben (award shared with Serdar Somuncu)
  - Paulaner Solo
  - Tollwood-Festival München - Kleinkunstpreis
  - Passauer Scharfrichterbeil
  - Zeck-Kabarettpreis - Newcomer award Fresh Zeck
- 2005
  - Bavarian Cabaret Prize Senkrechtstarter (en. approximately: High-flyer)
  - Deutscher Kleinkunstpreis Förderpreis der Stadt Mainz
  - Goldener Spaten Senkrechtstarter
  - Sprungbrett (Förderpreis des Handelsblattes)
- 2008
  - Deutscher Kleinkunstpreis in der Kategorie Kabarett
- 2011
  - Asteroid 233653 Rether, discovered by German amateur astronomer Rolf Apitzsch in 2008, was named in his honor. The official naming citation was published by the Minor Planet Center on 15 June 2011 (M.P.C. 75353).

== Discography ==
- 2005: Liebe ISBN 3-86604-162-4
- 2007: 3. Politischer Aschermittwoch 2007 ISBN 3-931265-65-X
- 2007: Liebe Zwei ISBN 3-86604-711-8
- 2010: Liebe 3. Random House Audio, ISBN 978-3-8371-0388-5
- 2012: Liebe 4. Random House Audio, ISBN 978-3-8371-1466-9
- 2014: Liebe Fünf. Random House Audio, ISBN 978-3-8371-2539-9
- 2016: Liebe 6. Random House Audio, ISBN 978-3-8371-3520-6
