= Frank-Markus Barwasser =

German journalist (born 1960)

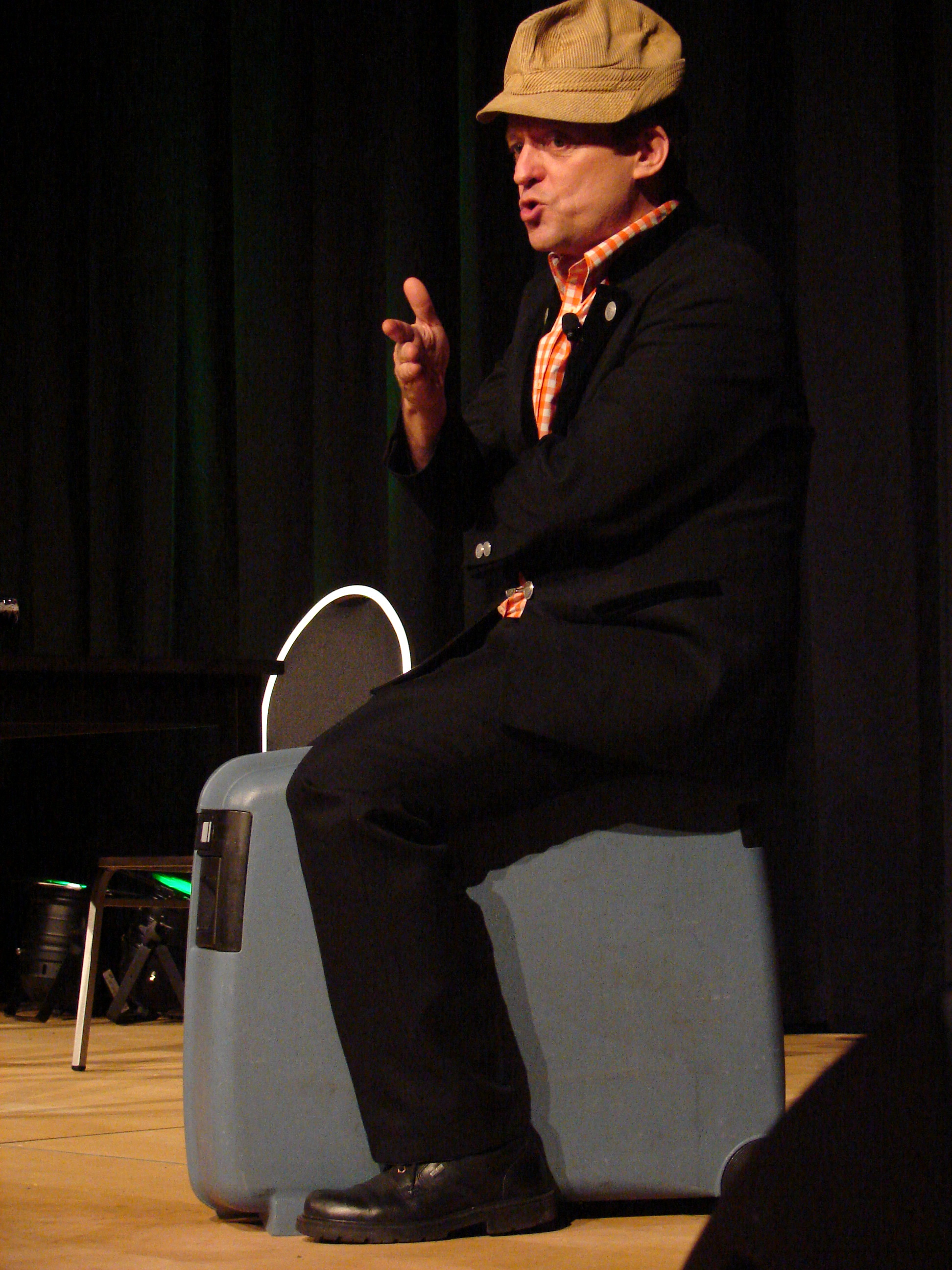
- Barwasser as Erwin Pelzig, wearing a corduroy hat
- Born: 16 February 1960 (age 66); Würzburg, Bavaria, West Germany
- Education: LMU Munich; University of Salamanca
- Occupations: Political satirist; journalist
- Awards: Dieter Hildebrandt Prize (2020)

Frank-Markus Barwasser (born 16 February 1960 in Würzburg) is a German political satirist and journalist. On stage, he almost always acts as the character of Erwin Pelzig, wearing a corduroy hat.

Barwasser grew up in Würzburg, Lower Franconia, Bavaria. After working for the local newspaper, Main-Post, he studied political science, history and ethnology at LMU Munich and the University of Salamanca. From 1985, he began his career on stage as a satirist. In 1993, he invented the character of Erwin Pelzig, which has been his most popular character ever since.

Until 2013, he was co-host, with colleague Urban Priol, of the satirical ZDF show Neues aus der Anstalt and until 2015 he was host of a talk show for the same channel, "Pelzig hält sich".

== Awards ==
- 2020 Dieter Hildebrandt Prize
