= Peter Hammerschlag =

Austrian writer and artist

Peter Hammerschlag in 1932

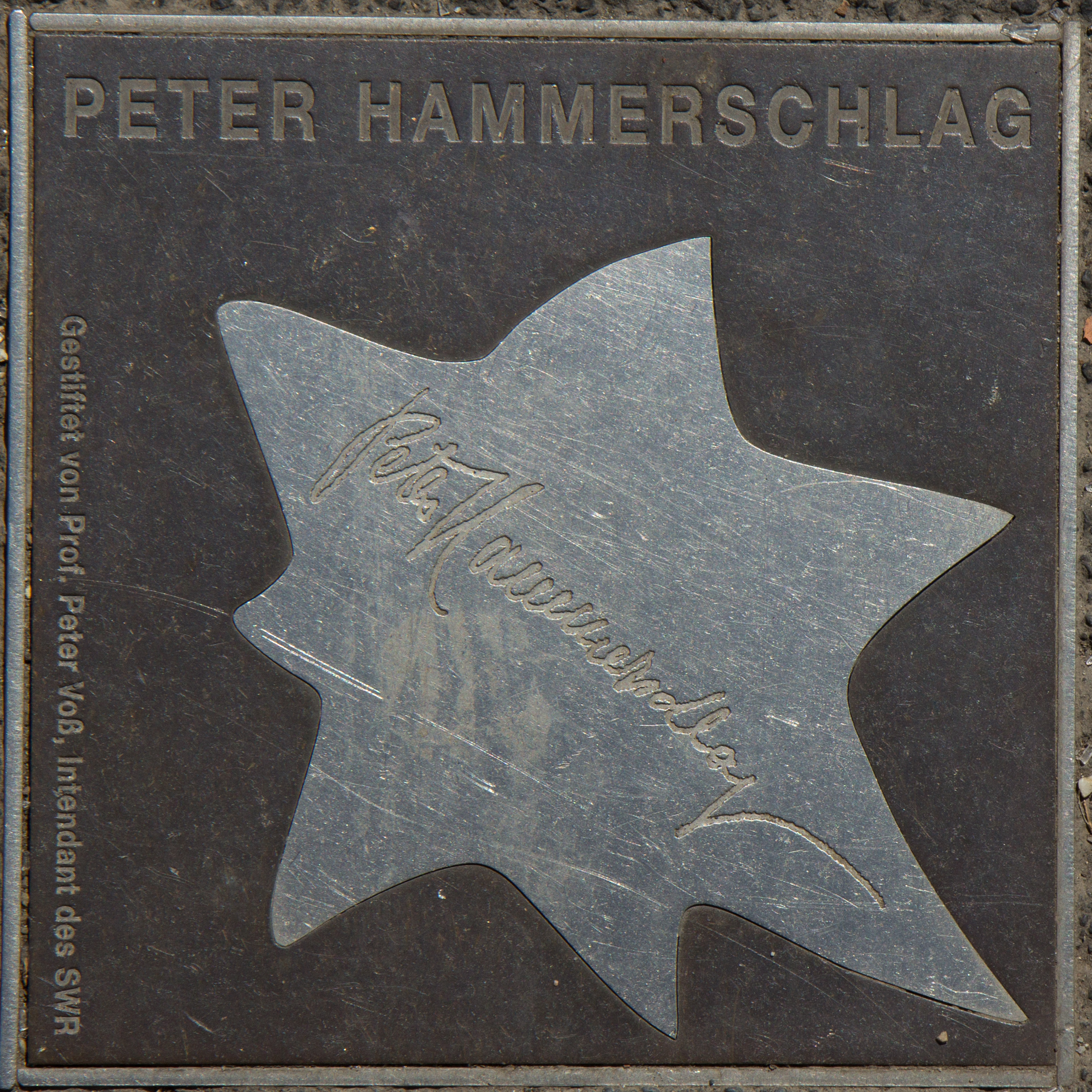
Hammerschlag's star at the Walk of Fame of Cabaret.

Peter Hammerschlag (27 June 1902, Alsergrund, Vienna — 1942, Auschwitz concentration camp) was a Jewish writer, surrealist poet, actor, Kabarett artist and graphic artist in Austria. He was known for his cabarets, which continue to influence the arts in Austria today, and in 2007, was honoured on the Walk of Fame of Cabaret. Hammerschlag was granted an exit permit to leave Austria for Argentina in September 1941, he was, however, unable to obtain a passport through any channels. Later that year he was put into a forced labour camp, and in 1942, he was murdered in the Auschwitz concentration camp. His work has been on display at the City of Vienna's Jewish Museum.
