= Walk of Fame of Cabaret =

Sidewalk between Proviant-Magazin and Schönborner Hof in Mainz, Germany

Coordinates: 49°59′56″N 8°15′56″E

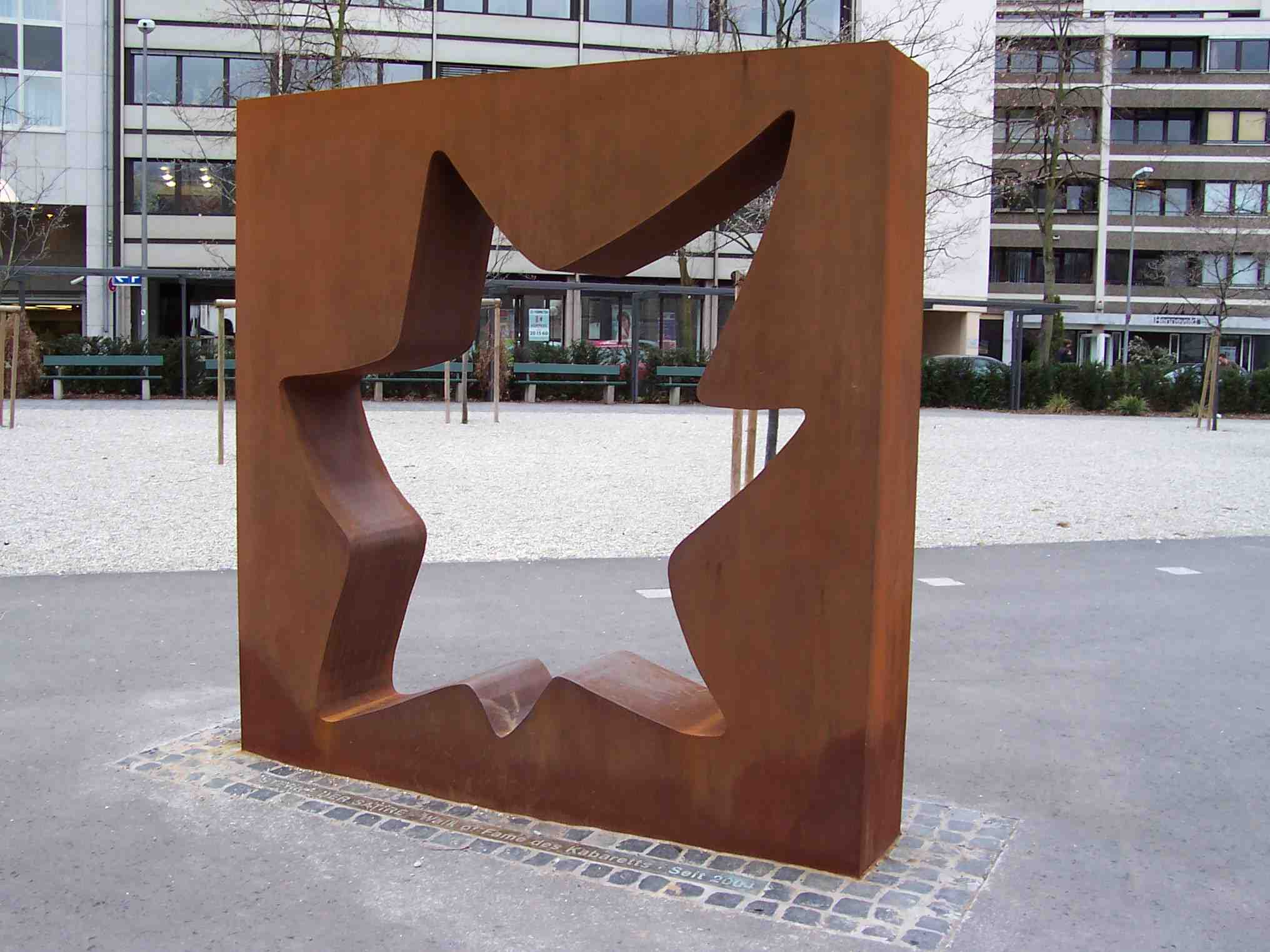
Star of Satire in Mainz

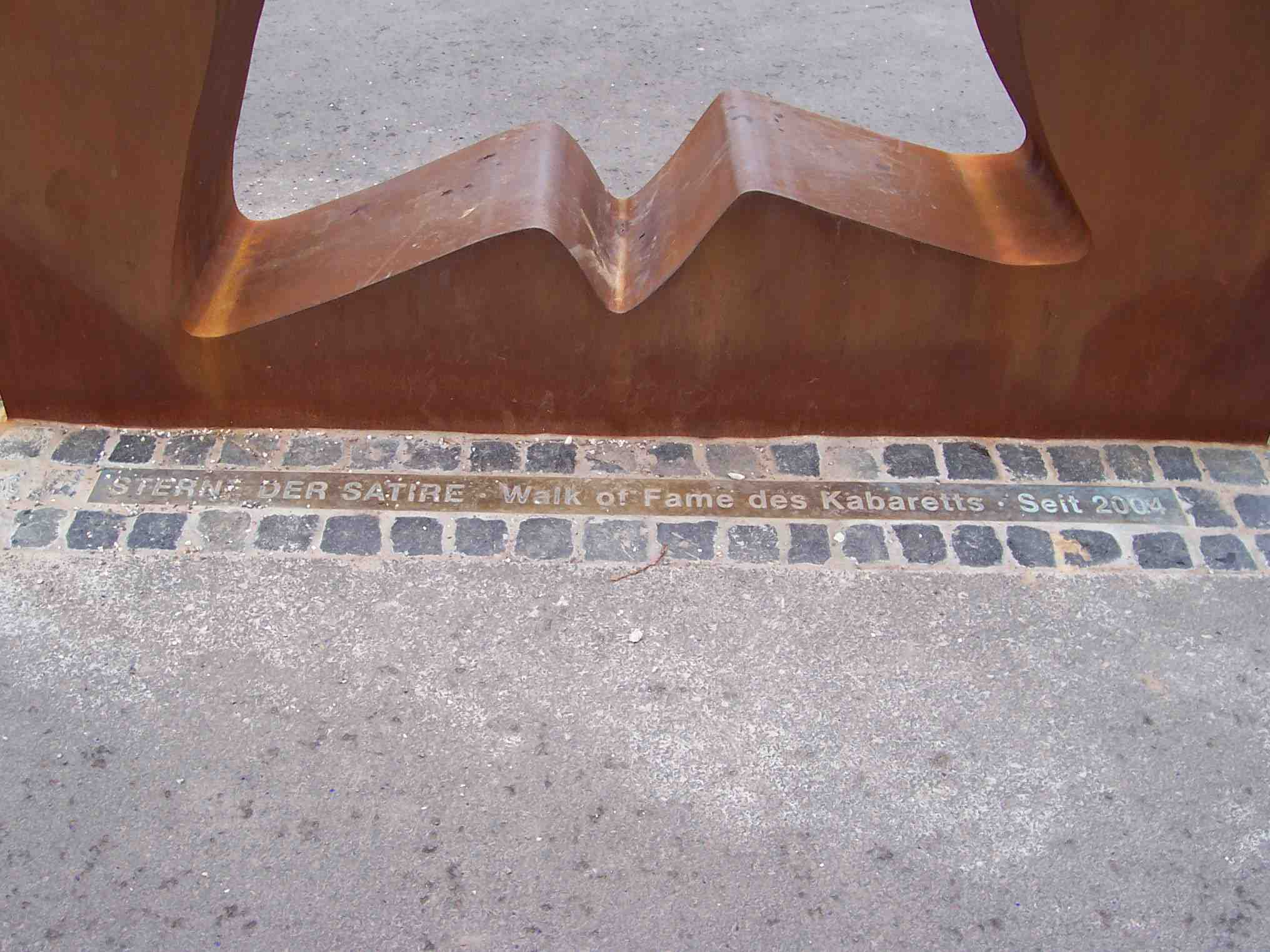
"Star of Satire - Walk of Fame of Cabaret - since 2004"

The Walk of Fame of Cabaret is a pavement between Proviant-Magazin and Schönborner Hof in Mainz, Germany, which is embedded with more than 40 seven-pointed irregularly shaped stars featuring the names of cabaret celebrities selected by a group of experts and honoured by several sponsors for their contributions to the cabaret culture.

The first stars, awarded on July 16, 2004, were inaugurated in the presence of Christina Weiss, Culture Representative and Minister of State of Germany and Kurt Beck, the premier of the German federal state of Rhineland-Palatinate. In January 2007, Peter Hammerschlag was honoured, and his became the 43rd star on the walk.

== Characteristics ==
The Walk of Fame runs north to south between Münsterstraße and Schillerstraße.

Each star consists of a stainless-steel seven-pointed irregularly shaped star, inlaid into a bronze square. Inside the star, the signature of the honouree is etched. The full name of the honouree in capital letters can be seen on the bronze square, as well as the sponsor in normal letters.

The committee of experts initially selected 80 deceased stars to be honoured on the walk of fame. Additionally to these, each year a living author or interpreter receives a star.

== Details on the honourees ==
Details on the honourees may be found at the nearby Stiftung Deutsches Kabarett (German Cabaret Foundation). Here, the core of the German Cabaret Archive is formed by more than eighty literary estates with biographies, documents and cultural heritage, regarding eighty thousand people from the history of cabaret and the forms of comedy that preceded it. This archive is based on the private initiative of Reinhard Hippen (1961). The counterpart of the "Walk of Fame" can be found in the "Hall of Fame" in the Bernburg castle, in Saxony-Anhalt. Numerous exhibits remind viewers of the "immortals" of cabaret.

== List of stars ==
Of all the nominated people, the following stars have been created:

#	nominated people		Image
1.	Werner Finck (1902–1978)	July 16, 2004	
2.	Hugo Ball (1886–1927)	July 16, 2004	
3.	Jürgen von Manger (1923–1994)	July 16, 2004	
4.	Kurt Tucholsky (1890–1935)	July 16, 2004	
5.	Wolfgang Neuss (1923–1989)	July 16, 2004	
6.	Otto Grünmandl (1924–2000)	July 16, 2004	
7.	Blandine Ebinger (1899–1993)	July 16, 2004	
8.	Erich Kästner (1899–1974)	July 16, 2004	
9.	Claire Waldoff (1884–1957)	July 16, 2004	
10.	Hugo Wiener (1904–1993)	July 16, 2004	
11.	Ortrud Beginnen (1938–1999)	July 16, 2004	
12.	Kurt Gerron (1897–1944)	July 16, 2004	
13.	Wolfgang Gruner (1926–2002)	July 16, 2004	
14.	Lore Lorentz (1920–1994)	July 16, 2004	
15.	Walter Mehring (1896–1981)	July 16, 2004	
16.	Kaspar Fischer (1938–2000)	July 16, 2004	
17.	Klabund (1890–1928)	July 16, 2004	
18.	Matthias Beltz (1945–2002)	July 16, 2004	
19.	Trude Hesterberg (1892–1967)	July 16, 2004	
20.	Curt Bry (1902–1974)	October 28, 2004	
21.	Eckart Hachfeld (1910–1994)	October 28, 2004	
22.	Helen Vita (1928–2001)	October 28, 2004	
23.	Heinz Erhardt (1909–1979)	October 28, 2004	
24.	Valeska Gert (1892–1978)	October 28, 2004	
25.	Friedrich Hollaender (1896–1976)	October 28, 2004	
26.	Georg Kreisler (1922–2011)	October 28, 2004	
27.	Hanns Dieter Hüsch (1925–2005)	April 27, 2005	
28.	Klaus Peter Schreiner (b. 1930)	April 27, 2005	
29.	Karl Valentin (1882–1948)	April 27, 2005	
30.	Christian Morgenstern (1871–1914)	April 27, 2005	
31.	Erich Mühsam (1878–1934)	April 27, 2005	
32.	Ursula Herking (1912–1974)	April 27, 2005	
33.	Gerhard Polt (b. 1942)	August 17, 2005	
34.	Dieter Hildebrandt (1927–2013)	September 7, 2005	
35.	Gisela May (1924–2016)	October 6, 2005	
36.	Günter Neumann (1913–1972)	October 6, 2005	
37.	Mischa Spoliansky (1898–1985)	October 6, 2005	
38.	Erika Mann (1905–1969)	October 6, 2005	
39.	Rudolf Nelson (1878–1960)	October 6, 2005	
40.	Joachim Ringelnatz (1883–1934)	October 6, 2005	
41.	Fritz Grünbaum (1880–1941)	October 6, 2005	
42.	Otto Reutter (1870–1931)	December 11, 2005	
43.	Herbert Bonewitz (b. 1933)	July 7, 2006	
44.	Dietrich Kittner (1935–2013)	October 5, 2006	
45.	Edgar Külow (1925–2012)	October 5, 2006	
46.	Martin Morlock (1918–1983)	October 5, 2006	
47.	Werner Richard Heymann (1896–1961)	October 5, 2006	
48.	Kate Kühl (1899–1970)	October 5, 2006	
49.	Karl Farkas (1893–1971)	October 5, 2006	
50.	Peter Hammerschlag (1902–1942)	December 5, 2006	
51.	Frank Wedekind (1864–1918)	September 11, 2007	
52.	Helmut Qualtinger (1928–1986)	September 11, 2007	
53.	Liesl Karlstadt (1892–1960)	May 6, 2008	
54.	Heino Jaeger (1938–1997)	May 6, 2008	
55.	Rosa Valetti (1876–1937)	May 6, 2008}	
56.	Joachim Hackethal (1924–2003)	May 6, 2008	
57.	Paul Graetz (1890–1937)	May 6, 2008	
58.	Rodolphe Salis (1851–1897)	May 6, 2008	
59.	Ernst Busch (1900–1980)	May 6, 2008	
60.	Werner Schneyder (1937–2019)	October 14, 2008	
61.	Peter Ensikat (1941–2013)	May 1, 2009	
62.	Wolfgang Schaller (b. 1940)	May 1, 2009	
63.	Emil Steinberger (b. 1933)	June 8, 2009	
64.	Loriot (1923–2011)	June 8, 2009	
65.	Klaus Staeck (b. 1938)	April 13, 2010	
66.	Rainer Otto (1904–1969)	April 12, 2011	
67.	Trude Kolman (1904–1969)	April 12, 2011	
68.	Hanne Wieder (1925–1990)	April 12, 2011	
69.	Aristide Bruant (1851–1925)	April 12, 2011	
70.	Peter Wehle (1914–1986)	April 12, 2011	
71.	Jura Soyfer (1912–1939)	April 12, 2011	
72.	Alfred Rasser (1907–1977)	April 12, 2011	
73.	Franz Hohler (b. 1943)	April 12, 2011	
74.	Marlene Dietrich (1901–1992)	May 6, 2012	
75.	Gerhard Woyda (1925–2017)	October 22, 2013	
76.	Volker Kühn (1933–2015)	October 22, 2013	
77.	Ephraim Kishon (1924–2005)	October 22, 2013	
78.	Dieter Hallervorden (b. 1935)	September 15, 2015	
79.	Jaroslav Hašek (1883–1923)	September 15, 2015	
80.	Heinrich Heine (1797–1856)	September 15, 2015	
