= Notizen aus der Provinz =

German political cabaret TV program

- Genre: Political cabaret
- Presented by: Dieter Hildebrandt
- Country of origin: Germany
- Original language: German
- No. of episodes: 66

Original release
- Network: ZDF
- Release: 26 August 1973 – 22 November 1979

Related
- Neues aus der Anstalt (2007)

Notizen aus der Provinz (German for "News From the Province") is a political cabaret program that was hosted by Dieter Hildebrandt and broadcast by ZDF from 1973 to 1979. After its cancellation, it would be the last such program on the channel until Neues aus der Anstalt premiered in January 2007.

== About the show ==
=== History ===
Notizen aus der Provinz was the second attempt to establish a political cabaret show in German television after the Norddeutscher Rundfunk (NDR) had tried out a similar concept, Hallo Nachbarn! (based on the BBC show That Was the Week That Was), in 1963. Hildebrandt had previously worked on Rückblende for the NDR in which he featured in the persona of a politics-analysing roofer.

=== Conception ===
The program was created as a satirical news magazine and as such did not feature an intricate studio decoration. Instead, Hildebrandt — feigning provincial innocence — would sit on a desk and comment on recent events from a satirical perspective, combined with 3 to 5 minute long clips about the subjects.

=== Reception ===
The show proved soon to be popular with the audience, receiving an audience rating between 30% and 45%.

== Controversy ==
Like Hildebrandt's later program, Scheibenwischer, the Notizen were frequently attacked by conservative politicians, most notably by those of the Christian Social Union of Bavaria (CSU) and the Christian Democratic Union which served only to increase its popularity.

ZDF stopped production and broadcasting of two episodes as their content was deemed too controversial by the channel's authorities:

- In 1975, parts of an episode concerning abortion were censored and not broadcast. The censored parts contained the introduction of a fictional new law that would make sterilisation mandatory based on the number of the Personalausweis of men affected. Hildebrandt was awarded the Adolf-Grimme-Preis in 1976 for those parts.
- The 45th episode, due to be broadcast on 27 October 1977 and to deal with the topic of terrorism and the German Autumn, was cancelled. According to ZDF, the decision not to produce the episode was made by the editorial staff of the program while Hildebrandt commented in his autobiography Was bleibt mir anders übrig that the channel's management had deemed terrorism a taboo topic for satire and unsuitable for coverage in the program.

== Indefinitely on hiatus ==
In 1979, the ZDF chief of programming, Dieter Stolte, urged for the program to be put on hold. Officially this was declared as a "creative break" although Hildebrandt and others surmised that Stolte wanted to avoid the show influencing the 1980 federal elections. In the same year, ZDF stopped the collaboration with Hildebrandt who was considered "politically biased". Hildebrandt's persona as the innocent commentator from the province proved to be easily identifiable by the public and as such, identification with his satirical opinions about politicians was deemed very likely.

Officially the program is still on hiatus, with "Jahr des Kindes" being the last episode aired on 22 November 1979.

== Legacy ==
After the effective cancellation of the Notizen, Hildebrandt switched to the Sender Freies Berlin (SFB) where he founded the Scheibenwischer as a similar program that ran until 2009. ZDF would ban political cabaret from its programming until January 2007, when it was decided to broadcast a new cabaret program, Neues aus der Anstalt.
