= Jürgen Becker (comedian) =

German comedian and actor (born 1959)

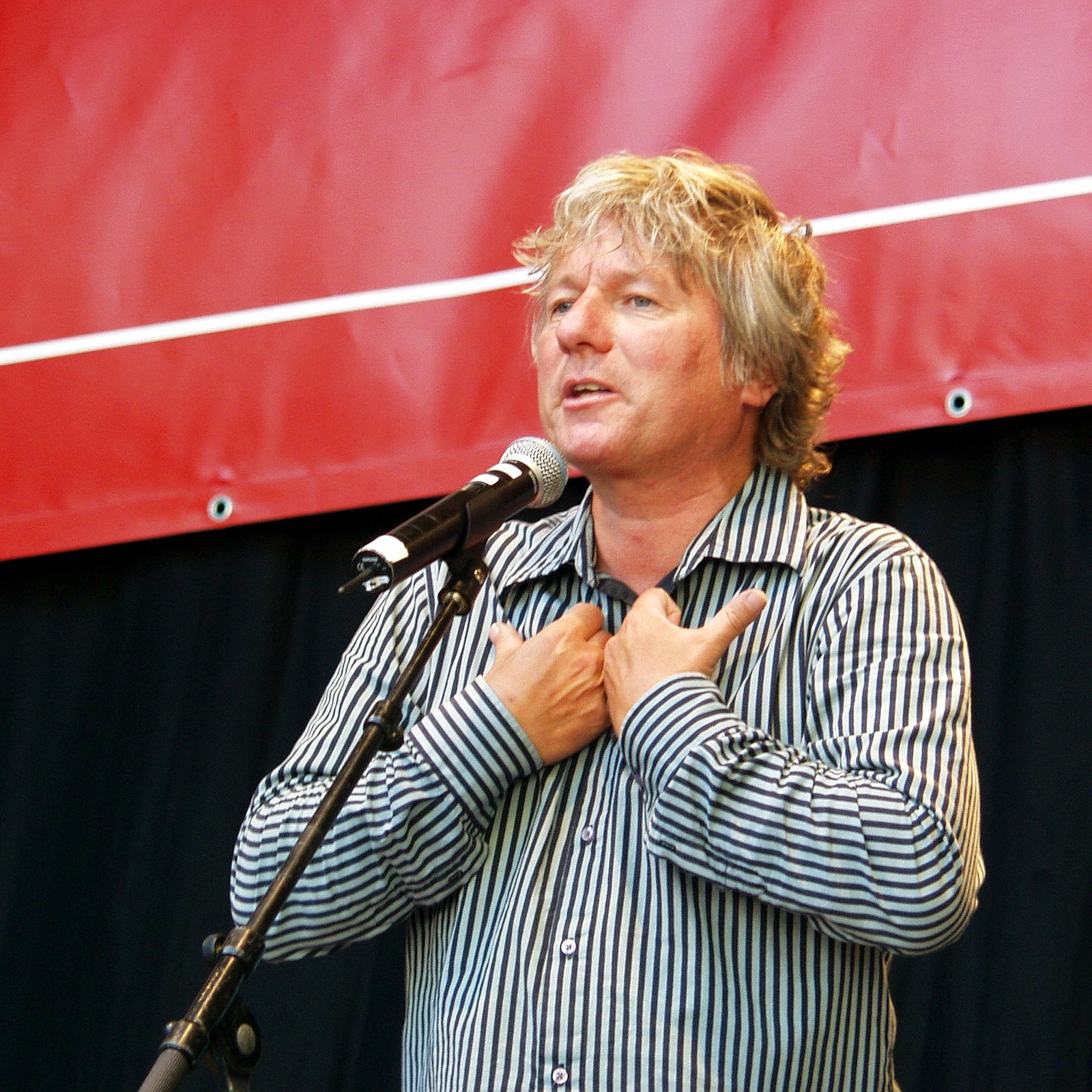
Jürgen Becker at "Kölner Herztag" 2007 („Kölner Infarkt Modell“) in Cologne.

Jürgen Becker (born August 27, 1959) is a German comedian, kabarett artist, and actor.

== Life ==
Becker was born and attended school in Cologne, Germany. He became a graphic designer in the German company 4711. Later Becker studied social science in Cologne.

In 1983, Becker was a founding member of Stunksitzung in Cologne, and he was its president from 1984 to 1995. Since 1992 Becker has performed in the television show Mitternachtsspitzen.

== Filmography ==
- Knockin’ on Heaven’s Door, 1997
