= Kindler =

Kindler is a surname. Notable people with the surname include:

- Andy Kindler (born 1956), American stand-up comedian
- Damian Kindler (born 1968), Australian-born Canadian writer and producer
- Hans Kindler (1892–1949), American cellist and conductor
- Jeff Kindler, the CEO of the Pfizer corporation
- Sven-Christian Kindler (born 1985), German politician

== See also ==
- Kindler syndrome, rare congenital disease of the skin caused by a mutation in the KIND1 gene
- Kindler v. Canada (Minister of Justice), landmark decision of the Supreme Court of Canada
