= Sarah Bosetti =

German writer

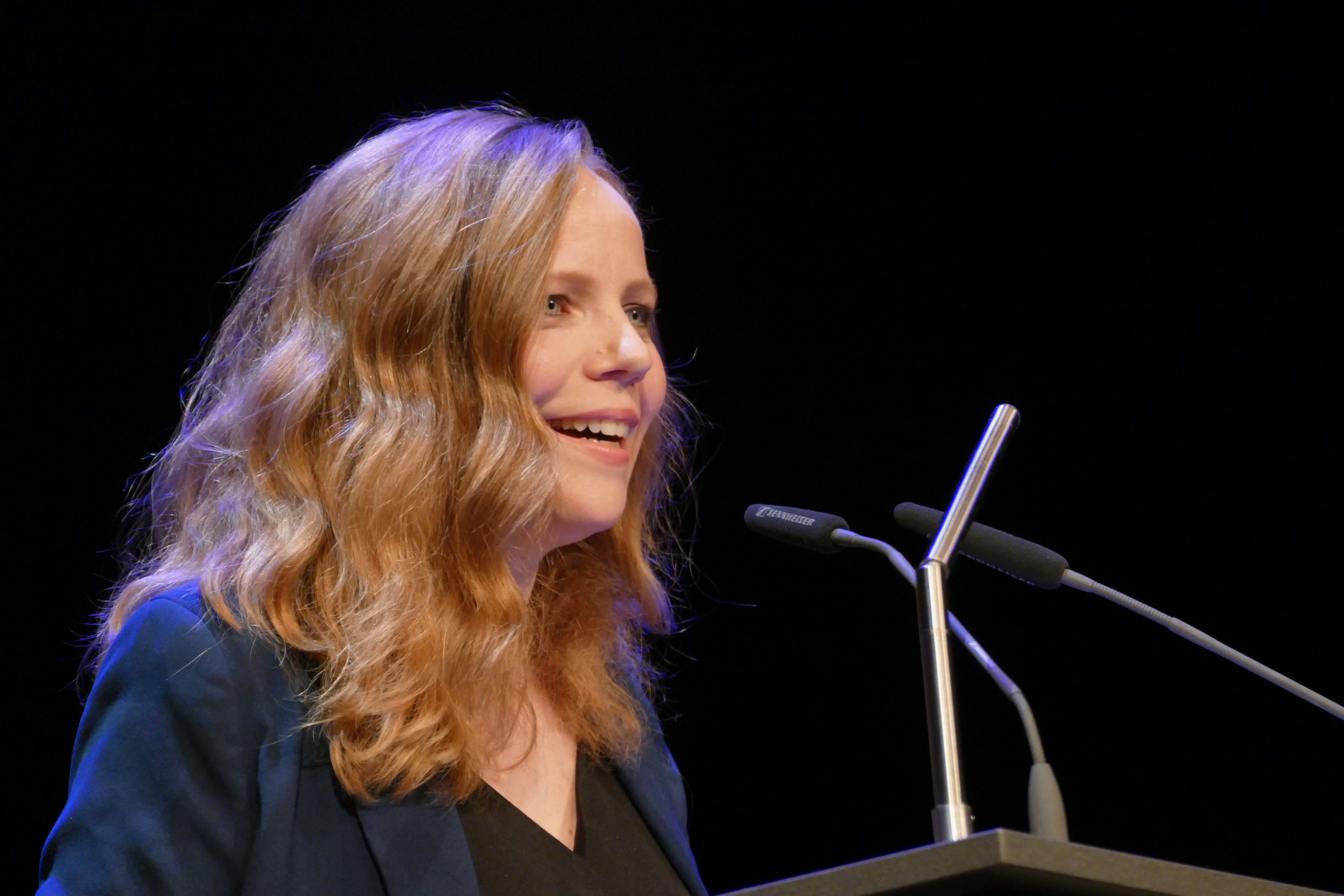
Bosetti at Dieter Hildebrandt Prize 2021

Sarah Bosetti (born 17 February 1984 in Aachen, West-Germany) is a German poet, author and satirical comedian.

== Life ==
Sarah Bosetti was born in Aachen, Germany, in 1984. Bosetti studied film-directing in Brussels. She graduated with a master's degree. Afterwards she traveled to Sardinia, Venice and Lisbon to live there for a few months. Then she moved to Berlin.

She first appeared on small cabaret stages with hand-made texts. Her success was then acknowledged by a few prizes: in 2019 she received the WDR First Ladies cabaret prize, in 2020 the Salzburger Stier and in 2021 the German cabaret prize (Deutscher Kleinkunstpreis). She was awarded the Dieter Hildebrandt Prize in 2021. Since 2020 she has been doing the ZDF online format "Bosetti wants to talk!". She has regular guest appearances on TV-programs like extra3 (NDR), Die Anstalt (ZDF), ARD Ladies Night (WDR) and midnight peaks (Mitternachtsspitzen (WDR)).

Bosetti is also producing radio programs on a regular term for radioeins (RBB) and WDR 2. She also tours Germany with her solo program "I have nothing against women, you bitch!".

In her free time she is writing books.

== Publications ==
- Make Democracy Great Again! Worte gegen den Weltuntergang. (Make Democracy Great Again! Words against the end of the world) Rowohlt Verlag, Hamburg 2025, ISBN 978-3-499-01837-4.
- "Wer Angst hat, soll zuhause bleiben!" ("Those who are afraid should stay home!") Rowohlt Verlag, Hamburg 2023, ISBN 978-3-499-01249-5.
- "Ich hab nichts gegen Frauen, du Schlampe!". Mit Liebe gegen Hasskommentare. (I have nothing against women, you bitch! With love against hate speech.) 2020 rororo ISBN 978-3-499-00191-8
- Ich bin sehr hübsch, das sieht man nur nicht so. Von einer die Auszog das Scheitern zu lernen. (I'm very pretty, you just don't see it that way. From someone who set out to learn how to fail.) 2019 rororo ISBN 978-3-499-63317-1
- Mein schönstes Ferienbegräbnis (My favourite Holiday funeral). 2015 Voland & Quist ISBN 978-3-86391-110-2
- Wenn ich eine Frau wäre (If I was a woman). 2014 Satyr Verlag ISBN 978-3-944035-42-0
