= Mathias Richling =

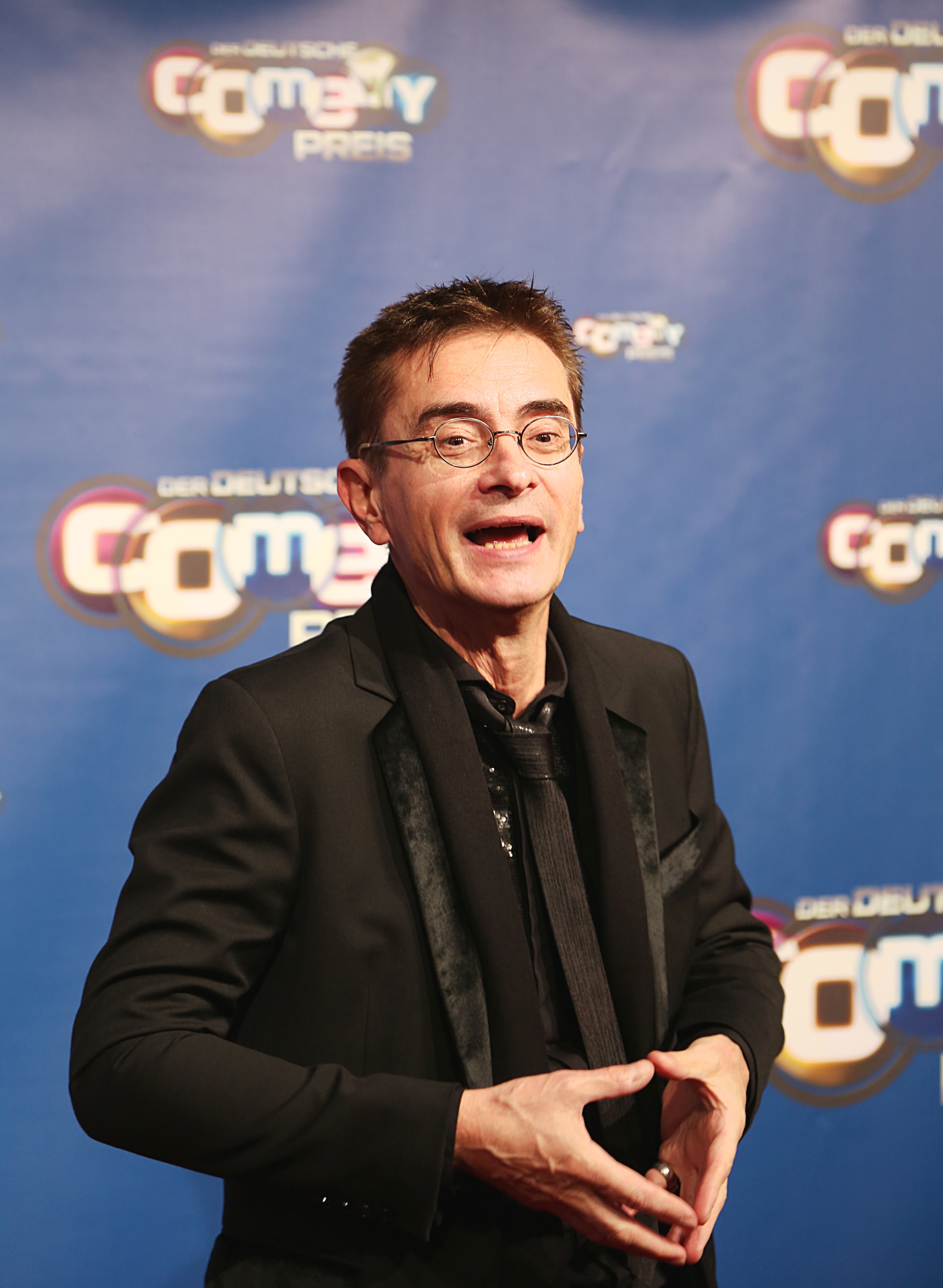
- Mathias Richling in 2017
- Born: 24 March 1953 (age 72); Waiblingen, Baden-Württemberg, West Germany
- Occupation(s): German actor, author, comedian and Kabarett artist
- Website: http://www.mathias-richling.de/

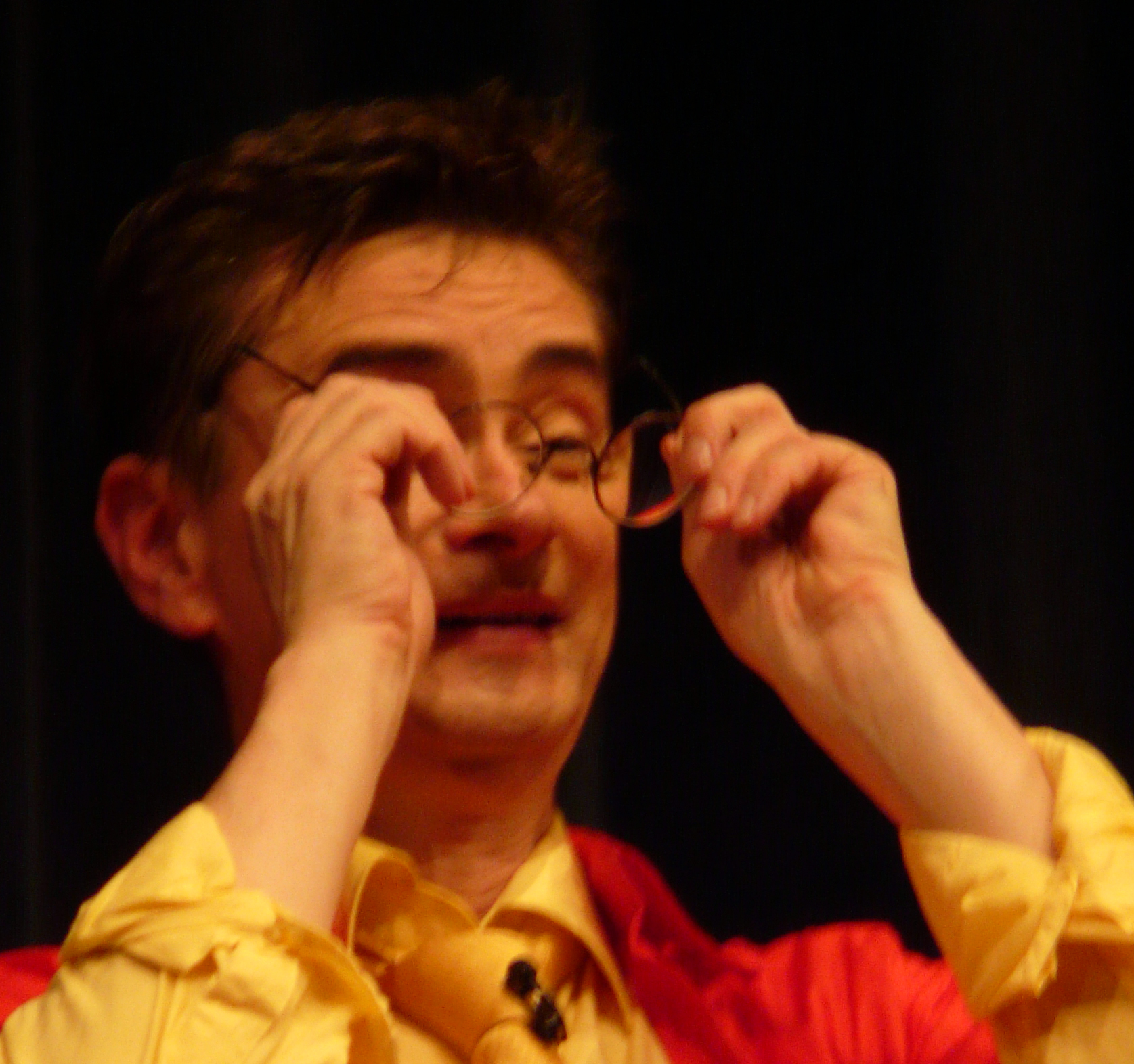
Mathias Richling in 2009

Mathias Richling (born 24 March 1953 in Waiblingen) is a German actor, author, comedian and Kabarett artist.

Richling studied literature, music and theatre. From 1989 to 1996 he had a program called Jetzt schlägt's Richling on the German TV channel ARD. Since 1999 he produced the program Zwerch trifft Fell on the German TV channel Südwestrundfunk. Together with Bruno Jonas he was part of the popular German cabaret show Scheibenwischer. He often presents in cabaret high-ranked German politicians.

== Works by Richling ==
- 1974 Köpfe u. v. a.
- 1976 Riesenblödsinn?
- 1977 Ich bin’s gar nicht
- 1979 Zuerst mal die Zugaben
- 1980 Zu uns gesagt mit Günter Verdin
- 1981 Ich habe nie gesagt
- 1982 Ich wiederhol’s gerade mal
- 1983 Daß Fernseh bled macht?
- 1985 Reden Sie! Jetzt red’ich!
- 1987 Wieviel Demokratie ist es bitte?
- 1989 Was ich noch vergessen wollte...
- 1990 Jetzt schlägt’s Richling
- 1996 Ich muß noch was beRICHLINGen
- 1999 RICHLING- Das @ntWort
- 2004 Richling WAAS?!
- 2006 E=m·Richling²
- 2010 Der Richling-Code

== Awards ==
- 1978: Deutscher Kleinkunstpreis, City Mainz
- 1987: Deutscher Kleinkunstpreis
- 1988: Österreichischer Kleinkunstpreis
- 2000: Schweizer Kabarettpreis (Cornichon)
- 2007: Bayerischer Kabarettpreis

== Literature about Richling ==
- Doris Rosenstein: Fernseh(schwäbisches) Kabarett [: Mathias Richling]. in: Suevica 7 (1993). Stuttgart 1994 [1995], Pages 153-192 ISBN 3-88099-311-4
