= Uwe Lyko =

German comedian and cabaretist (born 1954)

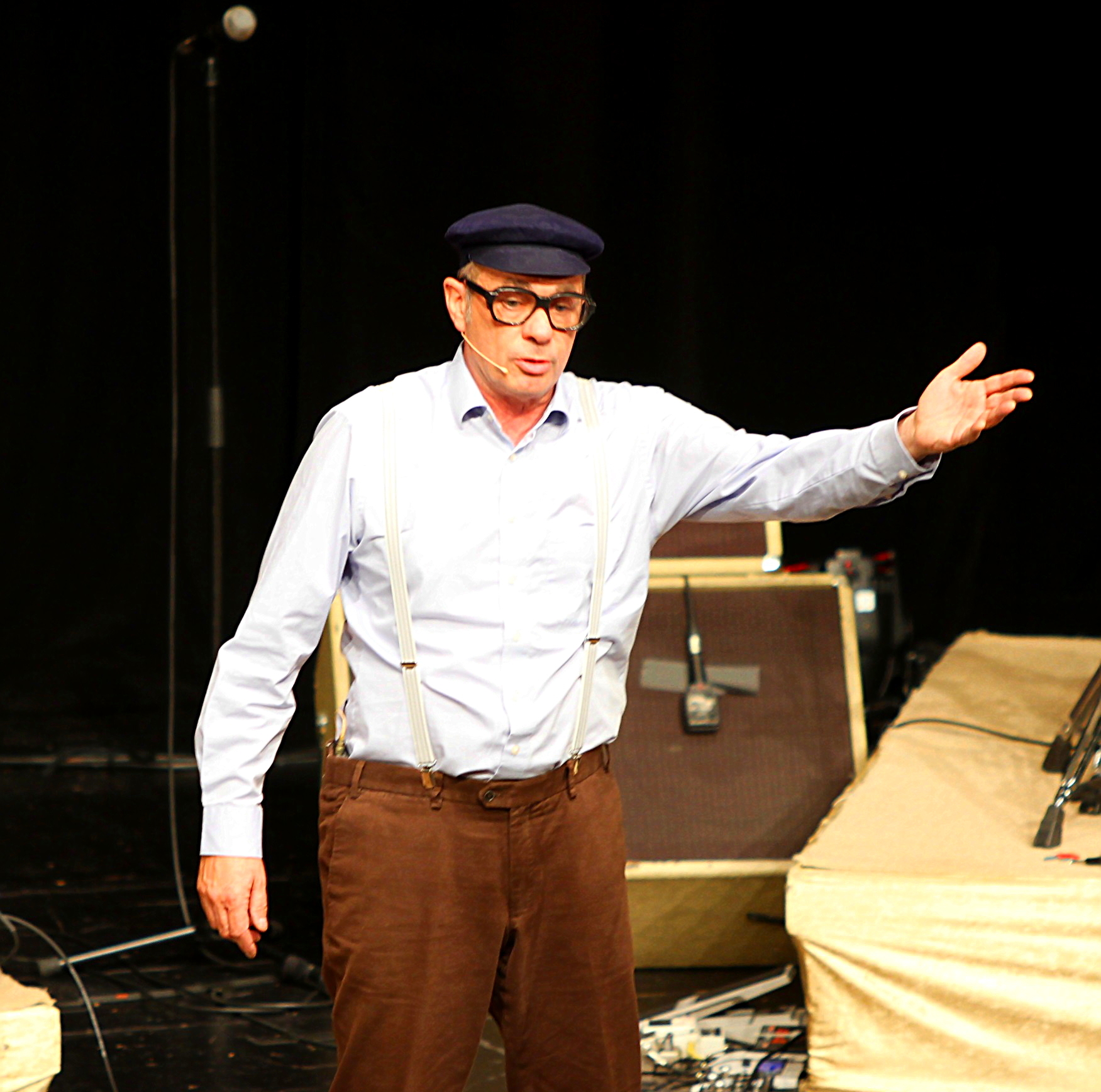
- Lyko as "Herbert Knebel" (2015)
- Born: 22 September 1954 (age 72); Duisburg, Germany
- Occupations: Comedian, cabaretist

Uwe Lyko (born 22 September 1954 in Duisburg) is a German comedian and cabaretist.

Lyko works in Germany as comedian and cabaretist. He became popular on German television cabaret and comedy shows. "Herbert Knebel" is one of his most famous characters. In 1988, Uwe Lyko began performing as Herbert Knebel with the comedy and music group Herbert Knebels Affentheater at Zeche Carl in Essen, Germany. In 1996, Lyko joined the cast of the Westdeutscher Rundfunk television cabaret programme Mitternachtsspitzen, appearing as Herbert Knebel.
