= Bruno Jonas =

German Kabarett artist and actor (born 1952)

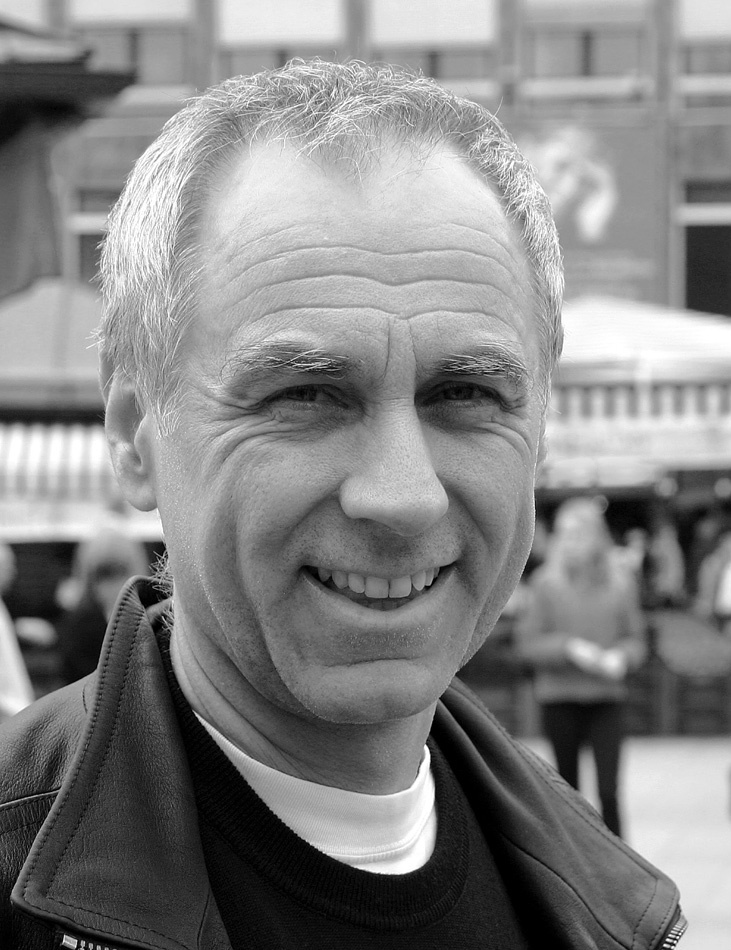
- Born: 3 December 1952 (age 73); Passau, West Germany
- Website: http://www.bruno-jonas.de/

Bruno Jonas (born in Passau, Germany, on 3 December 1952) is a German Kabarett artist and actor.

== Education ==
Many people predicted he would become a priest, but he prefers to pray from the Kabarett stage. Between 1975 and 1982, he studied German, political science, and philosophy at LMU Munich. After several years, he began to study theatre.

== Career ==
In 1975, Jonas played with Sigi Zimmerschied in the Kabarett Scharfrichterhaus. After an engagement as a writer and actor at the National Theatre in Munich, he started his first solo program in 1979. He reached Germany through his first own radio show Jonas and regular appearances with Dieter Hildebrandt as a member of the Kabarett theatre Münchner Lach- und Schießgesellschaft and later until today in the political Kabarett TV series Scheibenwischer (together with Mathias Richling). He also appeared as monk Bruder Barnabas at "Starkbieranstich" on the "Nockherberg" in Munich, a traditional ceremony usually in March, in which Bruder Barnabas gives a ticking-off to the present high-ranked politicians. In 2004, he started to work as a director at Theater am Gärtnerplatz where he also directed the Musical Man of La Mancha and played the part of Don Quichotte.

== Publications ==
- 1987 – Der Morgen davor
- 1990 – Wirklich wahr
- 1993 – Wirklich wahr (CD)
- 1995 – Hin und zurück
- 1996 – Es soll nie wieder vorkommen
- 1996 – Red ned (CD)
- 1998 – Ich alter Ego (CD)
- 1998 – Ich alter Ego
- 2000 – Bin ich noch zu retten?
- 2002 – Gebrauchsanweisung für Bayern
