= Das große Kleinkunstfestival =

Theatre festival in Berlin, Germany

Das große Kleinkunstfestival for cabaret, comedy, and music has been held annually since 2001 at the Die Wühlmäuse theatre in Berlin, Germany.

It features established and emerging performers and is broadcast live on rbb television.

Awards include a Jury Prize and an Audience Prize (each €2,000), along with additional special prizes that have varied over time. The festival was hosted by Dieter Nuhr until 2022, and by Ralf Schmitz in 2023. The 2024 edition was cancelled due to financial constraints, and its continuation is uncertain.
