= Dieter Hildebrandt =

German Kabarett artist, actor, and writer

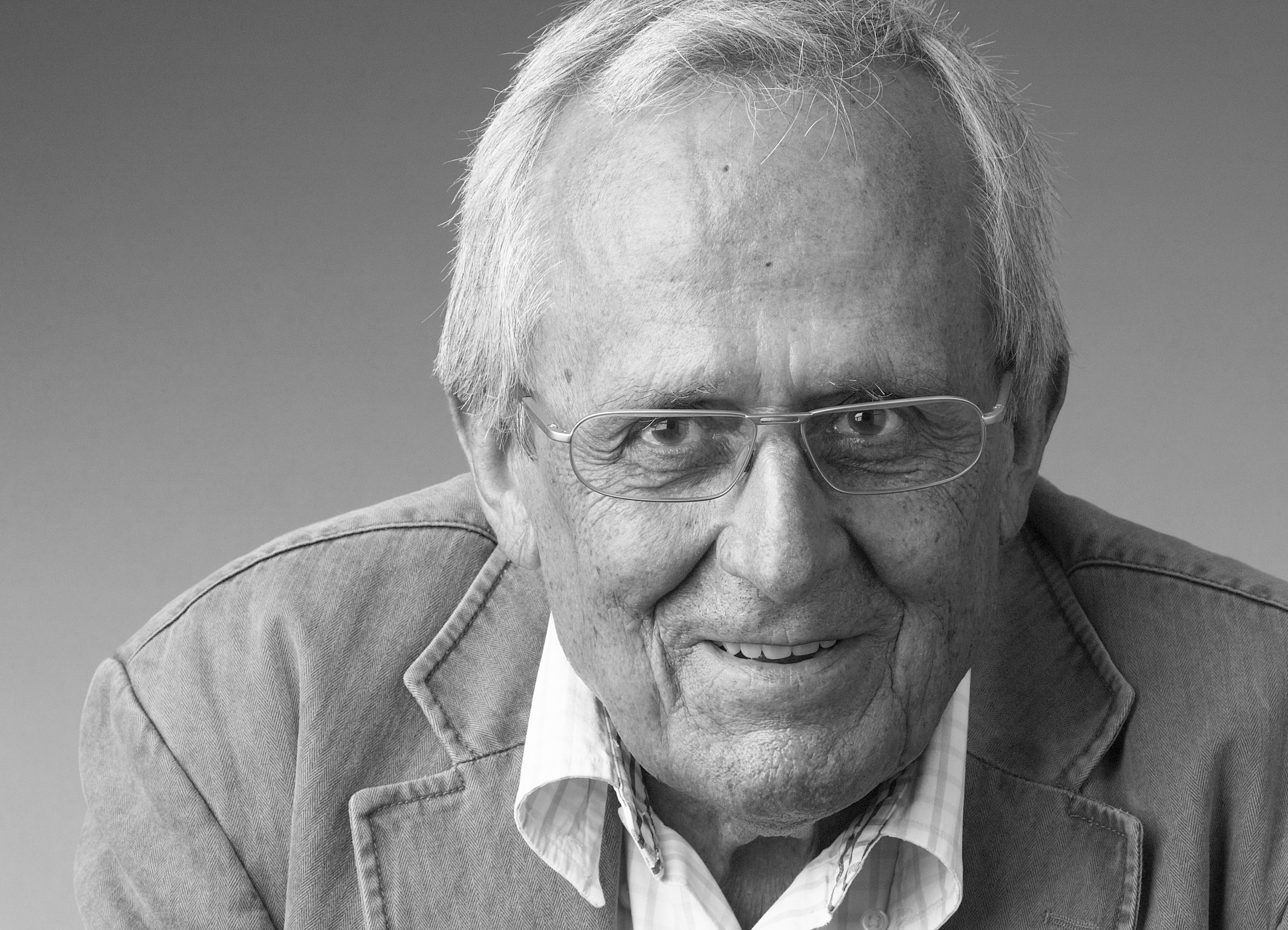
- Hildebrandt in 2010
- Born: 23 May 1927; Bunzlau, Lower Silesia, Prussia, Germany, now Poland
- Died: 20 November 2013 (aged 86); Munich, Bavaria, Germany
- Occupations: Kabarett artist, Comedian
- Years active: 1956–2013

Dieter Hildebrandt (23 May 1927 – 20 November 2013) was a German Kabarett artist.

== Biography ==
Hildebrandt was born in Bunzlau, Lower Silesia, Weimar Germany (now Boleslawiec, Poland) where he attended school. In World War II he became a Flakhelfer of the Luftwaffe but after four months was conscripted to the German Wehrmacht, in the same role.

In June 2007, a year after the Günter Grass Waffen-SS revelations, documents were released which showed that some prominent German intellectuals like Siegfried Lenz, Martin Walser and Dieter Hildebrandt had been members of the Nazi Party. For all three the documents showed their membership at a young age, during a late stage of the fascist regime in Germany – Hildebrandt's application was dated 19 February 1944 (when Hildebrandt was still 16) and he was admitted on 20 April 1944, Hitler's 55th birthday. Both Lenz and Hildebrandt said they were unaware of having written an application, and unaware that they became a member of the Nazi Party in 1944. Historians like Norbert Frei and Götz Aly said in that context that some local Nazi party leaders might have written mass applications to the party without the knowledge of the supposed applicants.

On 8 May 1945, Hildebrandt was taken captive by the United States Army, but was released a few months later.

In the years after the war, Hildebrandt finished his schooling and moved to Windischeschenbach in Bavaria. In 1948 he started studying theatre sciences in Munich. During that time he founded a student-performed cabaret show, "Die Namenlosen", in Schwabing. After finishing his studies Hildebrandt worked with Sammy Drechsel to found and develop the Münchner Lach- und Schießgesellschaft, a successful kabarett where he worked alongside cabaret artists such as Klaus Havenstein and Bruno Jonas. He stopped working with Drechsel in 1972, to work for radio and TV stations.

From 1973 until 1979 Hildebrandt was the presenter and author of the cabaret show "Notizen aus der Provinz" (Notes From The Province), which was broadcast by ZDF. In 1980 his show "Scheibenwischer" (Windscreen Wiper) first aired on the SFB, and remained on the air until 2003. In 1974 Hildebrandt, together with Werner Schneyder, started the "Autorenkabarett". This project lasted until 1982.

Hildebrandt was married to Irene Mendler from 1956 until her death in 1985. They had two daughters, Ursula and Jutta. He married German actress Renate Küster in 1992. Hildebrandt died in Munich on 20 November 2013. Just a few days earlier it had become public that he had cancer, something Hildebrandt himself apparently had known since the summer.

== Awards ==
- Grimme-Preis in bronze, silver and gold
- German cabaret-award
- Schiller Prize of the City of Mannheim
- Högner-award
- Knoeringen-award
- Kassel Literary Prize

== Selected filmography ==
Actor

- Stage Fright (1960)
- Murke's Collected Silences (1964, TV film, based on the story "Murke's Collected Silences") ... Dr. Murke
- Two Girls from the Red Star (1966) ... Silvestre
- Zwei himmlische Töchter (1978, TV series) ... Air traffic controller
- Kehraus (1983) ... Dr. Berzelmeier
- Kir Royal (1986, TV miniseries) ... Herbie Fried
- Man spricht deutsh (1988) ... Dr. Friedhelm Eigenbrodt
- Wir Enkelkinder (1992) ... Dr. von Wuest
- Zettl (2012) ... Herbie Fried

Screenwriter

- Sin Began with Eve (1958) (US version: The Bellboy and the Playgirls, 1962)
- Mein Mann, das Wirtschaftswunder (1961)
- One Prettier Than the Other (1961)
