= Monika Gruber =

German cabaret artist and actress

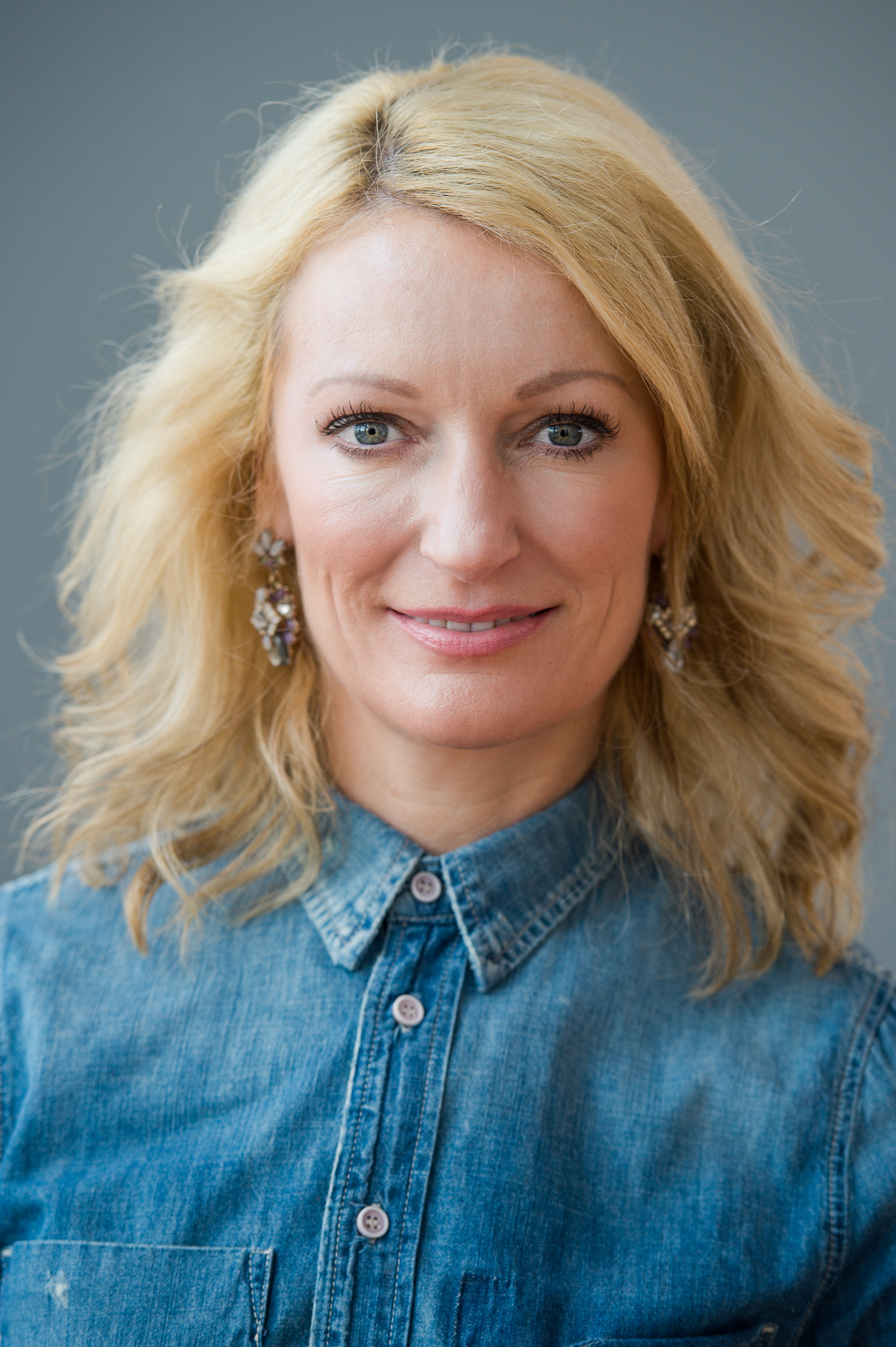
- Gruber in 2015
- Born: 29 June 1971 (age 55); Wartenberg, district Erding, West Germany
- Occupations: Cabaret artist and actress
- Website: https://www.monika-gruber.de/

Monika Gruber (born 29 June 1971 in Wartenberg, district Erding) is a German cabaret artist and actress.

== Life and career ==
=== Youth and education ===
Monika Gruber was raised with her two younger brothers on their parental farm in Tittenkofen, Upper Bavaria. After completing her A-levels, she worked for several years as a foreign language secretary. At the age of 27, she had completed a two-and-a-half-year program at the Ruth von Zerboni drama school. Her first theater engagement was from 2000 to 2005, as an ensemble member of Iberl-Bühne, directed by Georg Maier in Munich-Solln.

=== TV career ===
In 2002, Gruber gained her first experience as a cabaret artist in the comedy series Kanal fatal (in German), in which she portrayed Kellnerin Monique, a typical Bavarian waitress who, in broad vernacular speech, talks about her adventures in gastronomy. At the same time, she also performed in Günter Grünwald's Freitagscomedy(in German). From 2003 to 2009, she was a member of the Bavarian Television sketch series Die Komiker. She reported from Oktoberfest in Munich for Bayerischer Rundfunk or BR ('Bavarian Broadcasting') in 2004, and in 2006 she was a celebrity gossip commentator for Grünwald Freitagscomedy. In 2009, Gruber and Grünwald shot a four-part sketch show called Normal is des ned. That collaboration with Grünwald and BR ended in September 2009.

In 2012, the German broadcaster ZDF (Zweites Deutsches Fernsehen) gave Gruber her own TV series, Leute, Leute!, a boulevard satire. Contrary to the wishes of ZDF, Gruber didn't extend her contract for Leute, Leute! at the end of 2012, in order to gain more time for live performance. In the same year, she won a Bavarian TV award in the category of comedian for Die Große Quatsch Variety Show (Pro7), Monika Gruber live 2011 (BR), and Grünwald Freitagscomedy (BR).

From January 2011 to the end of 2013, Gruber, along with Bruno Jonas and Rick Kavanian, was a core member of Die Klugscheißer, a monthly satirical TV series of Bavarian Television. The show was discontinued when she withdrew to focus on her stage programs.

In April 2014, Gruber was again a regular guest on Grünwald Freitagscomedy, and she continued to perform with Günter Grünwald on a more regular basis in autumn 2014. For this reason, the title of the series was to be changed to Grünwald & Gruber Freitagscomedy. At the end of the year, however, Gruber and Bavarian Television announced that these plans would not be realized because of scheduling and conceptual difficulties.

In addition to her cabaret and comedy performances, Gruber acted in various TV productions. From 2008 to 2011, she played the leading role of Hannelore Herbst in the Bavarian Television series Der Kaiser von Schexing. From 2011 to 2013, she played reporter Barbara Hansen in the first 30 episodes of the ARD series Hubert & Staller. At the same time, she also played Moni Riemerschmidt in the new Heiter bis tödlich episodes of the Bavarian police series München 7 along with Florian Karlheim, Andreas Giebel, and Christine Neubauer.

=== Cabaret stage program ===
Gruber toured through the south of Germany and Austria in 2004 with her first solo program, Kellnerin Monique, schmeckt's ned? In 2005, her solo program Hauptsach' g'sund debuted. Her third stage program Zu wahr, um schön zu sein, celebrated its premier on 13 September 2008 in Munich, and was performed at the 17th Arosa Humor-Festival. From April 6, 2011, Gruber toured with her program Wenn ned jetzt, wann dann!.

In the turn of the year 2012–13, Gruber performed with Michael Niavarani in their "patchwork program" called Best of Beide, in a repeatedly sold-out town hall in Vienna. The program focused on 40-year-old singles, folks with "menstruation background", bad-tempered people from Vienna, and everyday lies. The stage performances in Bavaria in February 2013 were also well-attended.

In January 2014, Guber performed a fifth solo program, Irgendwas is' immer.

=== Social commitment ===
Gruber has been involved in the cabaret artist Christian Springer's association Orienthelfer e.V. and locally supports Lebanese refugees.

On June 10, 2023 Gruber spoke on a demonstration against the climate policy of the German government, in particular against the planned update of a law regulating heating of buildings (Gebäudeenergiegesetz), mobilizing 13,000 opponents.

=== Personal life ===
Gruber suffered from anorexia nervosa for several years during her adolescence.

From September 2011 to September 2012, she was in a relationship with the managing director of the Paulaner brewery, Andreas Steinfatt.

== Cabaret programs (selection) ==
- 2004: Kellnerin Monique: Schmeckt's ned?
- 2005: Hauptsach' g'sund
- 2008: Zu wahr, um schön zu sein
- 2011: Wenn ned jetzt, wann dann!
- 2014: Irgendwas is' immer

== Acting (selection) ==
All performances were in German or in Bavarian vernacular.

=== Television ===
- 2002: Retro
- 2004: The Old Fox
- 2004: Tatort (Crime scene) – Sechs zum Essen
- 2008–2011: Der Kaiser von Schexing
- 2010: Lotta & die alten Eisen
- 2011–2013, 2017–: Hubert & Staller
- 2012: The Perjured Farmer
- 2012–: München 7
- 2016–: Moni's Grill

=== Movies ===
- 2011: Hot Line
- 2012: Vatertage – Opa über Nacht
- 2014: Winterkartoffelknödel
- 2014: Die Mamba
- 2017: Teenosaurus Rex

=== Theatre ===
- 2009: Honigmond

=== Televised cabaret performances (selection) ===
- 2003–2009: Die Komiker
- 2004: Auffahrt Nockherberg
- 2005–2009 and 2014: Grünwalds Freitagscomedy
- 2005: Auf bairisch g'lacht
- 2006: Die Gruber
- 2006: Coconut Kiss
- 2007–2013: Neues aus der Anstalt
- 2009: Normal is des ned
- 2011–2013: Die Klugscheisser
- 2011: Wetten, dass..?
- 2012: Leute, Leute! (ZDF)
- bis 2012: Ottis Schlachthof
- 2013: Was gibts Neues? (ORF eins)
- 2014: Die Anstalt
- 2015: heute-show (ZDF)

== Books ==
- Man muss das Kind im Dorf lassen, Piper, München 2014, ISBN 978-3-492-05635-9.

== Awards ==
- 2006: Bavarian Cabaret Award(in German) in the Senkrechtstarter (high flier) category.
- 2007: Ernst-Hoferichter-Preis
- 2008: Merkur Theatre Prize(in German) of the newspaper Münchner Merkur
- 2010: nominated for German Comedy Award in the 'Best Comedian, female' category
- 2012: Bavarian TV Awards in the 'Entertainment, Comedian' category.
