= Pastewka (TV series) =

- Genre: Sitcom; Comedy; Dramedy
- Created by: Chris Geletneky; Sascha Albrecht; Bastian Pastewka
- Written by: Sascha Albrecht, Bastian Pastewka, Chris Geletneky, Erik Haffner
- Directed by: Joseph Orr; Jan Markus Linhof; Tobi Baumann; Peter Welz; Erik Haffner; Wolfgang Groos
- Starring: Bastian Pastewka; Sonsee Neu; Matthias Matschke; Bettina Lamprecht; Cristina Do Rego; Dietrich Hollinderbäumer; Sabine Vitua
- Voices of: Norbert Langer
- Theme music composer: Daniel Wehr
- Composers: Andreas Grimm; Daniel Wehr
- Country of origin: Germany
- Original language: German
- No. of seasons: 10
- No. of episodes: 99

Production
- Producers: Josef Ballerstaller; Ralf Guenther
- Production locations: Cologne, Germany
- Running time: 25 minutes
- Production company: Brainpool

Original release
- Network: Sat.1 (2005–2014); Amazon Prime Video (2018–2020)
- Release: September 9, 2005 – February 7, 2020

Related
- Die Wochenshow; Danni Lowinski

Pastewka is a German television sitcom that aired from 2005 to 2014 on German TV channel Sat.1. The series, currently in its tenth and last season, is set in Cologne, with German actor Bastian Pastewka starring as a fictionalized version of himself. It has been compared to Seinfeld and Larry David's Curb Your Enthusiasm. The series was awarded, among others, the Rose d'Or and the German Television Prize.

Pastewka is an Amazon Original since 2018. The eighth, ninth and final tenth season were released exclusively on Amazon Prime Video on January 26, 2018, January 25, 2019, and February 7, 2020.

== Cast ==
- Bastian Pastewka as Bastian Pastewka, a more or less famous German comedian
- Sonsee Neu as Annemarie “Anne” Leyfert, Bastian's girlfriend. She works as a doctor. Later in the series she becomes Bastian's fiancé.
- Matthias Matschke as Hagen Pastewka, Bastian's half-brother
- Cristina do Rego as Kimberly Jolante “Kim” Pastewka, Hagen's daughter and Bastian's niece. She is initially 13 years old and hates Bastian.
- Sabine Vitua as Regine Holl, Bastian's manager. She is often seen under the influence of alcohol.
- Bettina Lamprecht as Svenja Bruck, who lives in the same building as Bastian and does not like him. From the third season on, she is Hagen's girlfriend. They marry in season 8.
- Dietrich Hollinderbäumer as Volker Pastewka, Bastian's and Hagen's father

== Guest stars ==
Since the first season many German actors and media personalities have appeared in minor roles throughout the years.

- Michael Kessler as himself (season 1 to 10)
- Hugo Egon Balder as himself (season 1 to 10)
- Anke Engelke as herself (season 1 to 10)
- Annette Frier as herself (season 4 to 8)
- Christoph Maria Herbst as himself (season 1,2,4,8,10)
- Ingolf Lück as himself (season 1,2,4)
- Til Schweiger as himself (season 3)
- Michael Herbig as himself (season 3)
- Oliver Kalkofe as himself (season 1,2,5)
- Roger Willemsen as himself (season 5 and 6)
- Olli Dittrich as himself (season 1 and 4)
- Frank Elstner as himself (season 5)
- Oliver Welke as himself (season 4 and 5)
- Wigald Boning as himself (season 5)
- Bill Mockridge as himself (season 5)
- Luke Mockridge as himself (season 7 and 8)
- Oliver Pocher as himself (season 4 and 6)
- Matthias Opdenhövel as himself (season 5)
- Ralf Richter as himself (season 7)
- Guido Cantz as himself (season 7)
- Martin Semmelrogge as himself (season 1)
- Denis Moschitto as Birger Schönemann (season 2)
- Carolin Kebekus as prostitute (season 2)
- Georg Uecker as himself (season 2)
- Senta Berger as herself (season 8)
- Markus Lanz as himself (season 9)
- Jürgen Vogel as himself (season 9)
- Katja Woywood as herself (season 9)
- Heino Ferch as himself (season 9)
- Denis Scheck as himself (season 10)
- Bärbel Schäfer as herself (season 10)

== See also ==
- List of German television series
