= Das Amt =

- Starring: Jochen Busse
- Country of origin: Germany

Das Amt was a German comedy television series which aired between 1997 and 2002 on RTL. The series consisting of seven seasons, originally aired on RTL from 1997 to 2003. Jochen Busse, in the lead role of Hagen Krause, along with an ensemble cast, embodied the stereotypical behavior and bureaucracy commonly associated with civil servants in Germany. Director Dietmar Jacobs, who later won the Grimme Award, influenced the creation of several other RTL formats centered around the cast of 7 Tage, 7 Köpfe.

== Storyline ==
The story unfolds within the building authority of a small Rhineland town, primarily focusing on the office of councillor Hagen Krause and his team. Councillor Krause, known for his grumpy demeanor, is accompanied by his secretary Ulla Herbst, the naive womanizer Rüdiger Poppels, and the idealistic Nadia Schäfer.

Despite their roles as public servants, the office community is more concerned with the personal interests of their private lives rather than fulfilling their professional responsibilities. As a result, incoming building applications are often rejected without thorough examination. The individuals in the office are careful not to get caught by their superior Dr. Stüsser, who prioritises maintaining a positive reputation to the outside world, even if it means disregarding regulations. Dr. Stüsser frequently places blame on Hagen Krause's office for any mistakes that occur.

In this self-serving environment, problems frequently arise, often taking on bizarre forms. Throughout the film, the officials navigate and resolve these peculiar issues. Only Nadia Schäfer remains dedicated to her duties, taking them seriously amidst the chaos and dysfunction of the office.

== Characters ==
=== Hagen Krause ===
Hagen is the head of the office responsible for approving building applications in the local building authority. Although he claims to have approved "several dozen" applications, most of them were either under the instructions of higher authorities or for personal gain. In order to avoid work, Hagen tended to reject the majority of the applications. His dismissive attitude towards the applicants often leads to conflicts with Nadia. Hagen is known for his quick temper, egotism, narcissism, and narrow-mindedness. Ironically, he is also dominated by his controlling wife, which contributes to his unhappiness in their marriage. The only thing Hagen finds worse than his working day is the end of the day when he has to return home, especially if his mother-in-law is present. His loyal companion and best friend is his dog Rex. Hagen is consistently overshadowed by Stüsser's enthusiasm for motorhomes. Finally, in the last episode, Hagen assumes Stüsser's position after he is fired for a major mistake.

=== Ulla Herbst ===
Ulla serves as Hagen's secretary and plays a vital role in maintaining the office's smooth functioning. Her responsibilities primarily include preparing coffee, making sandwiches, and handling various tasks assigned by Hagen (mostly personal rather than professional matters). Ulla, who values her appearance highly, often engages in flirting, leading to occasional romantic encounters. However, towards the end of the seventh season, she unexpectedly develops genuine feelings for Silvia Meier's father, who recently joined as a secretary, and the two form a romantic relationship.

=== Rüdiger Poppels ===
Rüdiger, is a seemingly ordinary candidate within Hagen's office. Under the self-proclaimed nomen "sexy Rüdi," he frequently arrives at work with a hangover, resulting from a night of partying or a recent romantic conquest. Despite his attempts at flirtation, his colleagues dismiss his tired pick-up lines without denting his self-assured womanizer persona. His colleague, Nadia, views him as a lazy and sexist individual. Rüdiger's innocence often leads him to become the scapegoat, especially from Hagen, for problems he may have contributed to. During the fourth season, Rüdiger spends time in Africa, leaving his position to be temporarily filled by Hans-Günther Timpel. In the final episode, Rüdiger discovers the secret to capturing the attention of Stüsser's secretary, Silvia Meier, causing her to eventually develop feelings for him.

=== Nadia Schäfer ===
Schäfer joins the Krause office as a candidate for office at the start of the series. She is highly driven and determined to restructure the office to be more user-friendly. With a background in applied sciences, Nadia is also actively involved in women's rights, veganism, peace activism, opposition to nuclear power, and has founded multiple citizens' initiatives. She passionately defends these beliefs both at work and during demonstrations. Her efforts to promote healthy eating in the office are met with resistance from colleagues. Her disapproval of Hagen's treatment of applicants pales in comparison to her deep disdain for Kimmel. As the series progresses, Nadia is hired permanently and becomes a civil servant.

=== Dr. Paul Stüsser ===
Stüsser holds the title of administrative director within the office and a member of the Christlich Demokratische Union Deutschlands (CDU). He is therefore the head of the building authority, which he takes every opportunity to emphasise by repeatedly acknowledging his rank as grade A 14. He is the direct superior to Hagen, who considers him to be incompetent. Stüsser, in retaliation, always manages to find fault with Hagen. He continually strives to make a favourable impression on influential individuals, often prioritising this over his own work and team members. Stüsser is father to one daughter, and has a strong interest in motorhomes. In his youth, he displayed talent as a goalkeeper and was selected to play for the football team. His accomplishment of earning a doctorate in economics is also a source of pride for Stüsser, to the extent that he insists on being called 'Doctor' even when dressed as Father Christmas at official Christmas parties.

=== Rudi Kimmel ===
Assistant to Stüsser, employing tactics of flattery to advance his own career. Kimmel frequently clashes with Hagen, engaging in a competitive dynamic where they each strive to shame the other in front of their superiors. Hagen's disdain is particularly intensified by Kimmel's unwavering support for Bayern Munich, a German football club. Despite Kimmel's longstanding interest in his coworker Nadia, she consistently rejects his persistent advances.

=== Lünebach ===
As the office boy, Lünebach has access to all office processes, which gives him a degree of influence over the characters and the operations. He is well remunerated for information and favours - especially by Hagen. Lünebach is known to personally profit from the predicaments of his colleagues lives and always comes out the laughing stock.

=== Stefanie Hemmer (from season 3) ===
Over the course of the series, Hemmer becomes the mayor - using her role to publicise the town and advance her career. Her character skilfully plays the employees of the building authority off against each other. As a woman and social democrat, she is not taken seriously by either Stüsser or Hagen. Her predecessors in the mayoral office (including Lutz Herkenrath as Mayor Dr Behr) also make sporadic guest appearances.

=== Hans-Günther Timpel (season 4) ===
Timpel takes over Rüdiger's role during his trip to Africa, in season 4. Lünebach assists Timpel in gaining his position through forged certificates, which suggest Timpel is a genius. Unfortunately, Timpel's clumsiness is noticed by his office peers. Timpel was initially supposed to work for Kimmel, but with Lünebach's help, he was quickly transferred. Timpel views Hagen as a role model and he attempts to emulate him. Romantically, Timpel begins the season with a possessive girlfriend called Babsi. Their relationship comes to an end at the conclusion of the fourth season when Babsi raises her suspicions of Timpel have an affair with Nadia.

=== Silvia Meier (from season 6) ===
From season 6, Meier become the secretary of Stüsser. Her arrogant manner makes her particularly unpopular with her colleagues, though she is the focus of Rüdiger's romantic attentions. She gives in to his constant advances in the series finale, when the two become a couple.

== Background ==
The television series was produced by Cologne-Sitcom from 1996 to 2002. In addition to the series creator and main writer Dietmar Jacobs, Andrea Bosse and Torsten Goffin, a writer from Cologne, also contributed scripts. Jacobs later received the prestigious Grimme Award for his work on the office mockumentary Stromberg, which had similar themes. The directors of the series included Micha Terjung, Titus Selge, and Franziska Meyer Price. Micha Terjung also served as producer starting from season five. The old town hall of Wesseling, identifiable by the town coat of arms above the entrance, and its surroundings were used as the filming location for the exterior shots. The buildings surrounding the town hall were also used as backgrounds for window views. The series featured numerous notable stage and television comedians such as Hans-Joachim Heist, Hugo Egon Balder, Elisabeth Wiedemann, Oliver Kalkofe, Rudi Carrell, and Bastian Pastewka. Additionally, pop singers Peter Kraus and Achim Mentzel made guest appearances on the show.

The 30-minute series originally aired from 1997 to 2003 on Friday evenings, preceding the comedy panel show called "7 Tage, 7 Köpfe" (7 Days, 7 Heads), which was also hosted by Jochen Busse. The first episode premiered on February 14, 1997, attracting an audience of 6.12 million viewers, making it one of the most successful comedy series launches in German television history. The show's popularity led to other actors from the series being given their own comedy series in subsequent years. For example, "Rita's World" aired from 1999 to 2003 and starred Gaby Köster, while "Bernd's Witch" aired from 2002 to 2005 and featured Bernd Stelter. Both spin-off shows reached peak viewership of up to 8 million. In the summer of 2002, lead actor Busse announced the end of the series after its seventh season, stating that "all the stories have been told." The series has been rerun multiple times and is now available on DVD, although the season premieres "Jeder Jeck ist anders" and "Das Amt in Berlin" are not included in the DVD release.

In 1998, the television series had several crossovers with the series Und tschüss! sowie Nikola. Ulrike Bliefert and Thorsten Nindel reprised their roles from Das Amt in the TV film Und tschüss!: Ballermann olé. In a later episode of Das Amt, characters from the show Nikola, nurse Nikola Vollendorf (Mariele Millowitsch) and Dr Robert Schmidt (Walter Sittler), admitted Hagen Krause to the hospital (Das Amt, episode 20). This led to Hagen Krause appearing as a nagging patient in Nikola (episode 17). After Das Amt ended, the show's creator, Jacobs, developed another short-lived series called Nicht von dieser Welt, also for Cologne-Sitcom. This new show starred Busse as the alien character Yok. Despite airing in the same time slot as Das Amt, Nicht von dieser Welt was not as successful.

In 2000, the official comedy CD for the series was made available to the public. The CD features various versions of the song "Wir sind das Amt" from episode 20, titled "Des Wahnsinns fette Beute," as well as spoken contributions from the characters and catchy jingles. In addition, a booklet is included which provides a detailed biography of each character. Interestingly, in episode 60, titled "Der Frührentner," there is a scene where an advertising poster for this CD can be seen hanging in the office canteen.
