= Mockridge =

Mockridge is a surname. Notable people with this surname include:

- Bill Mockridge (born 1947), Canadian-German actor
- Cyril J. Mockridge (1896–1979), English-American film and television composer
- Frank Mockridge (1903–1990), Australian rules footballer
- Jeremy Mockridge (born 1993), German actor
- Luke Mockridge (born 1989), German comedian and author
- Matthew Mockridge (born 1986), German entrepreneur and singer
- Russell Mockridge (1928–1958), Australian racing cyclist
- Tom Mockridge (born 1955), New Zealand businessman, current CEO of Virgin Media
