= Heute-show =

German late-night satirical television program

heute-show
- Genre: Comedy, news satire
- Presented by: Oliver Welke
- Opening theme: "Breakfast Briefing" by Terry Devine-Kings
- Country of origin: Germany
- No. of episodes: 433

Production
- Executive producers: David Flasch (2009–2010); Georg Hirschberg; Gregor Salmingkeit
- Production locations: Cologne, Germany
- Running time: 30–35 minutes

Original release
- Network: ZDF
- Release: 26 May 2009 – present

The heute-show ("(the) today show"; stylized in its logo as heute SHOW) is a German late-night satirical television program airing every Friday evening on public broadcasting channel ZDF. A conceptual adaptation of The Daily Show with Jon Stewart, it is presented by German comedian and journalist Oliver Welke. Heute show presents the weekly news with funny or sarcastic and cynical comments, especially focusing on issues that are subject of the latest political discussions in Germany. Welke argues that he might help to make people interested in politics and might help to point out "what goes the wrong way" in parliamentary debates, in ministries, in institutions, and in parties. Sometimes, he simply mocks "people who deserve it" in his show.

== History ==
The first episode of the heute-show was broadcast on 26 May 2009. It started out as a monthly show airing on Tuesday, following another satirical program, Neues aus der Anstalt. Following the success of the first six pilot episodes and a "Best of" special in 2009, the heute-show was picked up as a weekly program for a first season of 24 episodes in the first half of 2010.

The 2013–14 ninth season had the best ratings of the show's history with reaching around three million viewers at the peak. The episode on 6 June 2014 was the highest-rated episode so far, with 3.90 million viewers and an overall market share from 25.1%. That episode also recorded in the target group ages 14–49 with 1.57 million viewers and 23.5% market share.

In 2014, heute-show correspondent Martin Sonneborn became top candidate of the satirically political party Die PARTEI for the parliament of the European Union. He had to leave the show after becoming a member of the parliament.

The heute-show made national news in October 2014. The episode broadcast on 17 October 2014 dealt with reporters not being allowed to film in the Bundestag anymore. Bundestag secretary Ernst Hebeker was quoted by Oliver Welke, saying that the show "doesn't do political-parliamentary reporting" as the reason for the decision. Welke argued what else they do over the entire runtime of the show if not doing political-parliamentary reporting. He also closed the show with saying that Hebeker would love to get "fan mail". The decision by the Bundestag was picked up by newspapers and several online news sites, and the heute-show was allowed to film in the Bundestag.

In 2017, the heute-show was elected the best satirical show by the audience of the Goldene Kamera awards.

== Cast ==
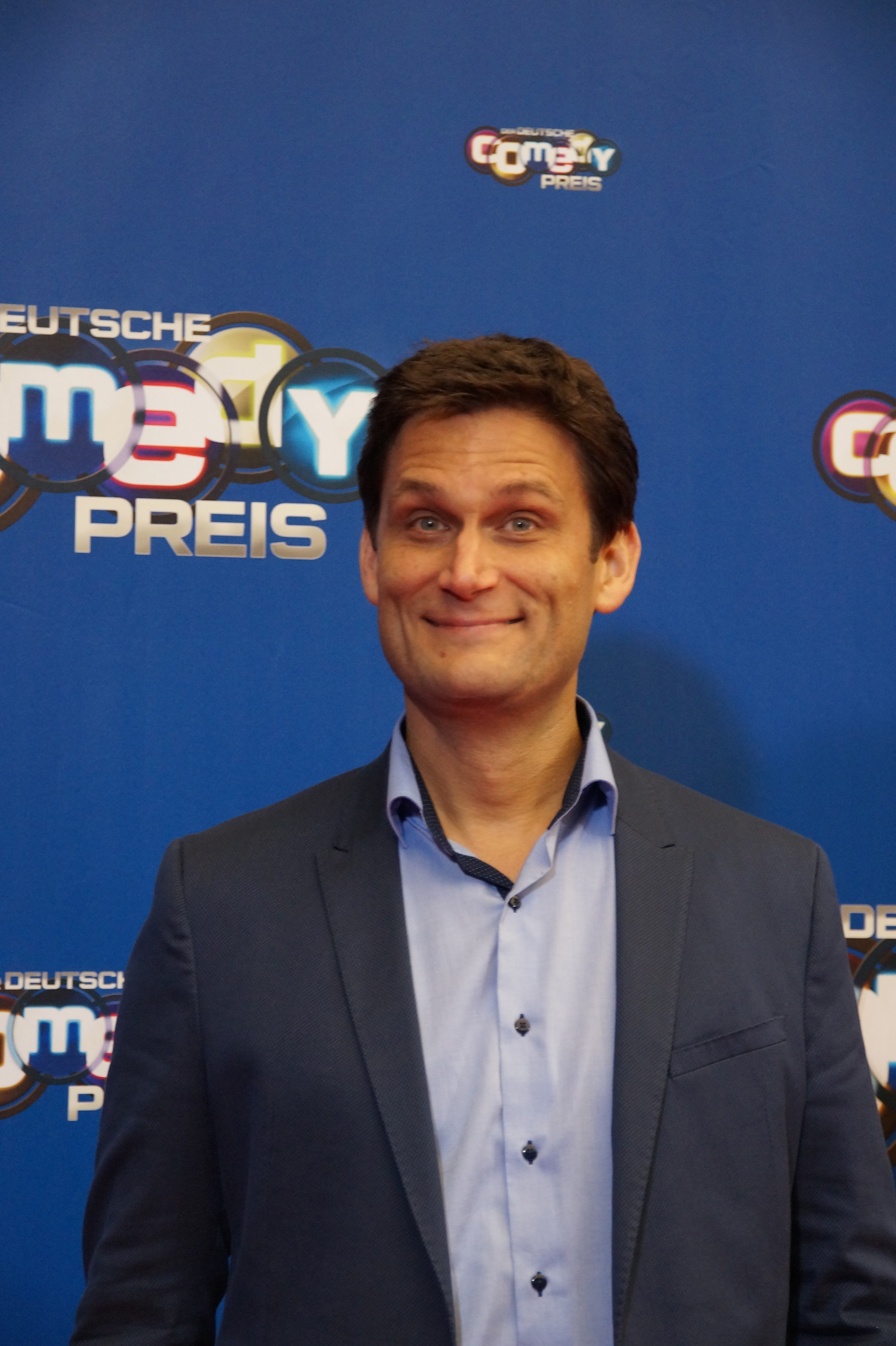
Christian Ehring, cast member of the heute-show

- Oliver Welke, anchorman of the show
- Martina Hill as Tina Hausten, head of the statistics division
- Christian Ehring, heute-show expert on numerous subjects
- Dietrich Hollinderbäumer as Ulrich von Heesen, the show's 70-year-old self-declared "youth correspondent"
- Hans-Joachim Heist as Gernot Hassknecht, whose role is very similar to Lewis Black's in the Daily Show's "Back in Black" segment
- Olaf Schubert, correspondent (2009–)
- Martin Sonneborn, correspondent (2009–2014)
- Lutz van der Horst, correspondent (2012–)
- Carsten van Ryssen, correspondent (2012–)
- Dietmar Wischmeyer, expert about so-called VIPs (in the so called Wischmeyers Logbuch der Bekloppten und Bescheuerten translation: Wischmeyer's logbook of the dopey and daft)

== Series overview ==
Season	Beginning	End
Pilot episodes	26 May 2009	23 June 2009
"Pilot season"	8 September 2009	30 December 2009
1	22 January 2010	8 June 2010
2	27 August 2010	17 December 2010
3	21 January 2011	17 June 2011
4	16 September 2011	16 December 2011
5	27 January 2012	1 June 2012
6	31 August 2012	14 December 2012
7	25 January 2013	7 June 2013
8	6 September 2013	13 December 2013
9	24 January 2014	6 June 2014
10	5 September 2014	19 December 2014
11	23 January 2015	29 May 2015
12	11 September 2015	18 December 2015
13	22 January 2016	3 June 2016
14	9 September 2016	16 December 2016
15	27 January 2017	2 June 2017
16	8 September 2017	15 December 2017
17	26 January 2018	8 June 2018
18	7 September 2018	14 December 2018
19	1 February 2019	7 June 2019
20	6 September 2019	13 December 2019
21	31 January 2020	12 June 2020
22	11 September 2020	11 December 2020
23	29 January 2021	4 June 2021
24	10 September 2021	10 December 2021
25	28 January 2022	10 June 2022
26	9 September 2022	9 December 2022
27	27 January 2023	

== Broadcast ==
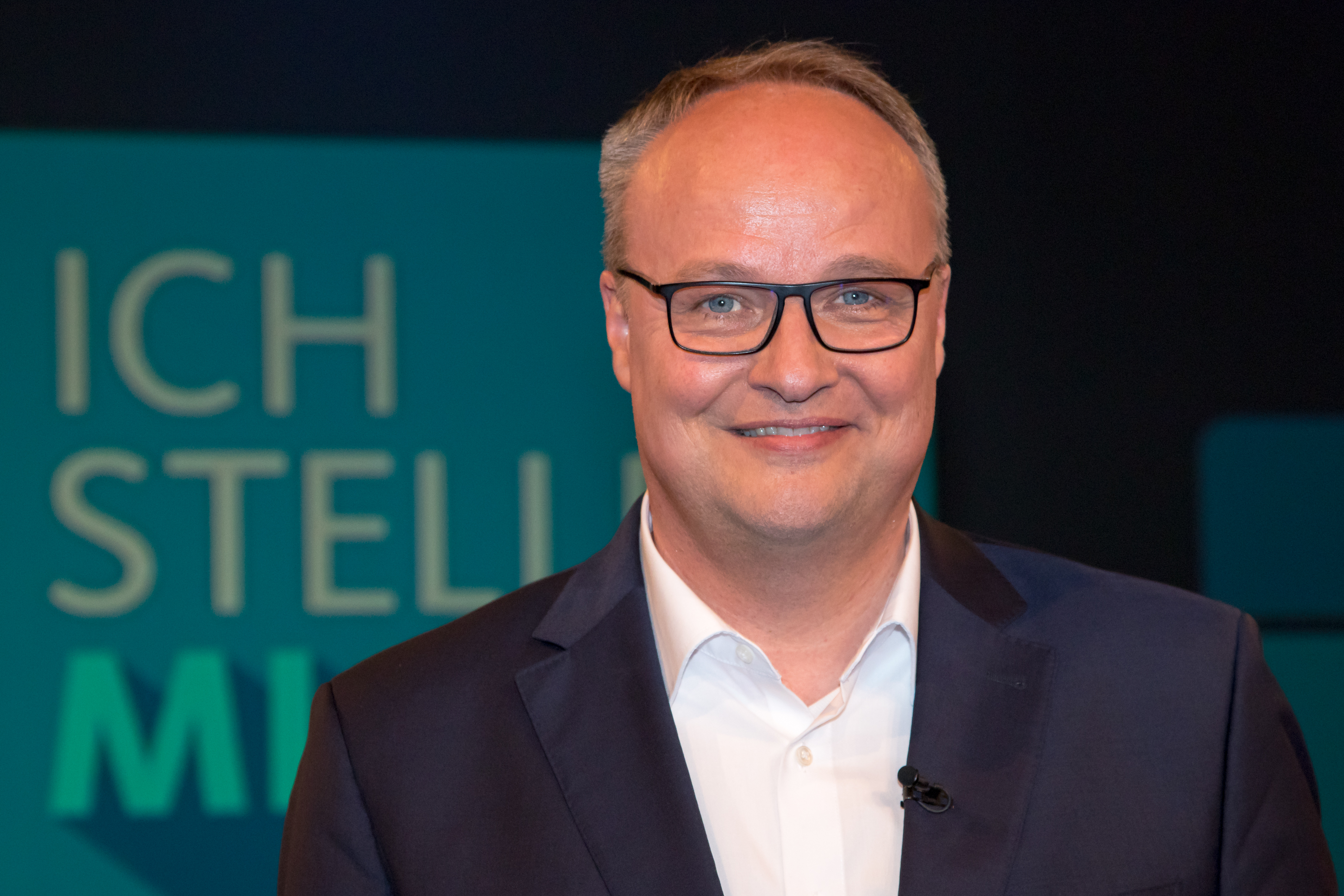
Oliver Welke, anchorman and author of the heute-show

The first two episodes of the show aired on 26 May and 23 June 2009 as pilot episodes. The pilot season started shortly afterwards on 8 September 2009 and ended on 30 December 2009 with a best-of. The show was first aired at 11 pm on Tuesdays, their weekly slot, however, was later on moved to 10:45 pm on Wednesdays.

The first regular season started on 22 January 2010 and again ended with a best-of on 8 June 2010. The first season as well as the pilot season changed their weekly slot. While the first few episodes aired at 10:30 pm on Fridays later episodes were moved back to 11 pm on Tuesdays. ZDFneo aired weekly reruns of the newest episode.

The second season started on 27 August 2010 and ended on 17 December with a best-of. The show was moved back to Fridays.

From the third season on (21 January 2011) they had earned a consistent weekly slot on Fridays. The show always airs on ZDF first and then reruns are aired on other ZDF channels. Like the preceding seasons the third season ended with a best-of.

The fourth season aired between 16 September and 16 December 2011. It is the first season that does not end in a best-of, but in a review of the year's events.

Several seasons followed, usually there are two per year: The first one airs between January and June and ends with a best-of, followed by a summer break, the second one begins at the end of summer and ends in December usually with a review of the year's events.

From the eleventh season on the show aired from a new and redesigned studio.

Sometimes the show was not aired due to recent events interfering with it (e.g. on 24 March 2015 when the Germanwings flight 9525 crashed in the Alps or on 13 November 2013 during the 2013 Paris attacks).

The shows popularity gradually increased and the TV ratings are generally high.

In 2017 the show was produced and aired in high-definition for the first time, which in comparison to other TV-shows happened quite late.

The current season (season 27) started on 27 January 2023.

=== Course of recording ===
The program is recorded in Studio 3 of the Cologne production company Brainpool TV every Friday at about 6 pm. Sometimes recorded laughter is even brought in during the performance of the crowd-warmer. This warm-up, including a "best-of" of former shows (in the past also "fail compilations"), is used to put the audience in the studio in a good mood. During the recording, the audience can independently react and applaud whereas the "warm-up" keeps in the background and only sends signals occasionally.

=== Guests ===
Occasionally the heute-show has guests from the field of journalism (like Steffen Seibert, Maybrit Illner, Hans-Ulrich Jörges) or politics (like Claudia Roth, Wolfgang Bosbach, Wolfgang Kubicki, Hannelore Kraft, Anton Hofreiter, Peter Tauber, Gregor Gysi and Jens Spahn). 27 January 2012 Rainer Brüderle, a German politician and member of the FDP (Free Democratic Party), was a guest in the studio. His rather unclear pronunciation, as well as his Palatine and Rhine-Hessian dialect, has prior been a reoccurring subject in the show. According to Welke, Brüderle had "enhanced the show contentwise like no other". With Peter Altmaier on the show in 2013, they were able to welcome a federal minister for the first time. Also, Dirk Niebel (FDP) and Jürgen Trittin (Alliance 90/The Greens) were guests in the Wahlkampfbussi (campaigning pecks) of the heute-show. Comedians and cabaretists are frequent guests on the heute-show, such as Florian Schroeder, Michael Mittermeier, Monika Gruber, Mike Krüger, Bastian Pastewka, Simon Gosejohann, Elton, Timo Wopp, Christoph Sieber, Torsten Sträter, Ingmar Stadelmann, Abdelkarim, Friedemann Weise and Oliver Polak. Many popular German public figures have made cameo appearances on the show, for instance, Kai Pflaume as an "East German teenager", Hella von Sinnen as a "lesbian headteacher", or Karl Lauterbach as a "ZDF inspector". Oliver Kahn once played himself in his position as a ZDF-expert at the coverage of the international football match of Germany-Argentina in September 2014. He also once played a former FC Bayern football player through a video-call in a show of November 2015. Other cameo appearances were Reiner Calmund, Hugo Egon Balder as a "substitute-host", Stefan Raab, and Axel Schulz.

=== Glitches ===
The show of 22 October 2012, did not air like scheduled at 10.30 pm because of a glitch during the dubbing to the ZDF-Sendezentrum (broadcasting control room) due to a technical error. The ZDF team then decided to air the literature program "Die Vorleser" (the readers) and the heute-show after that. The delay had negative effects on the viewing figures. The show of 18 March 2011, in which Michael Mittermeier was a guest, ended abruptly 41 seconds earlier than the actual end of the show. Since the heute-show had used the word "fap" and other sexual innuendos repeatedly in context with the term "nuclear fetishism", speculations arose on censorship by ZDF. The press also suspected a deliberate reference to the censorship of the satirical show "Scheibenwischer" (windshield wiper) of May 1986 (Chernobyl). In an interview in March 2011, however, the producer of the show Georg Hirschberg explained that a technical mistake concerning planning caused the premature end of the show.
