= Achim Mentzel =

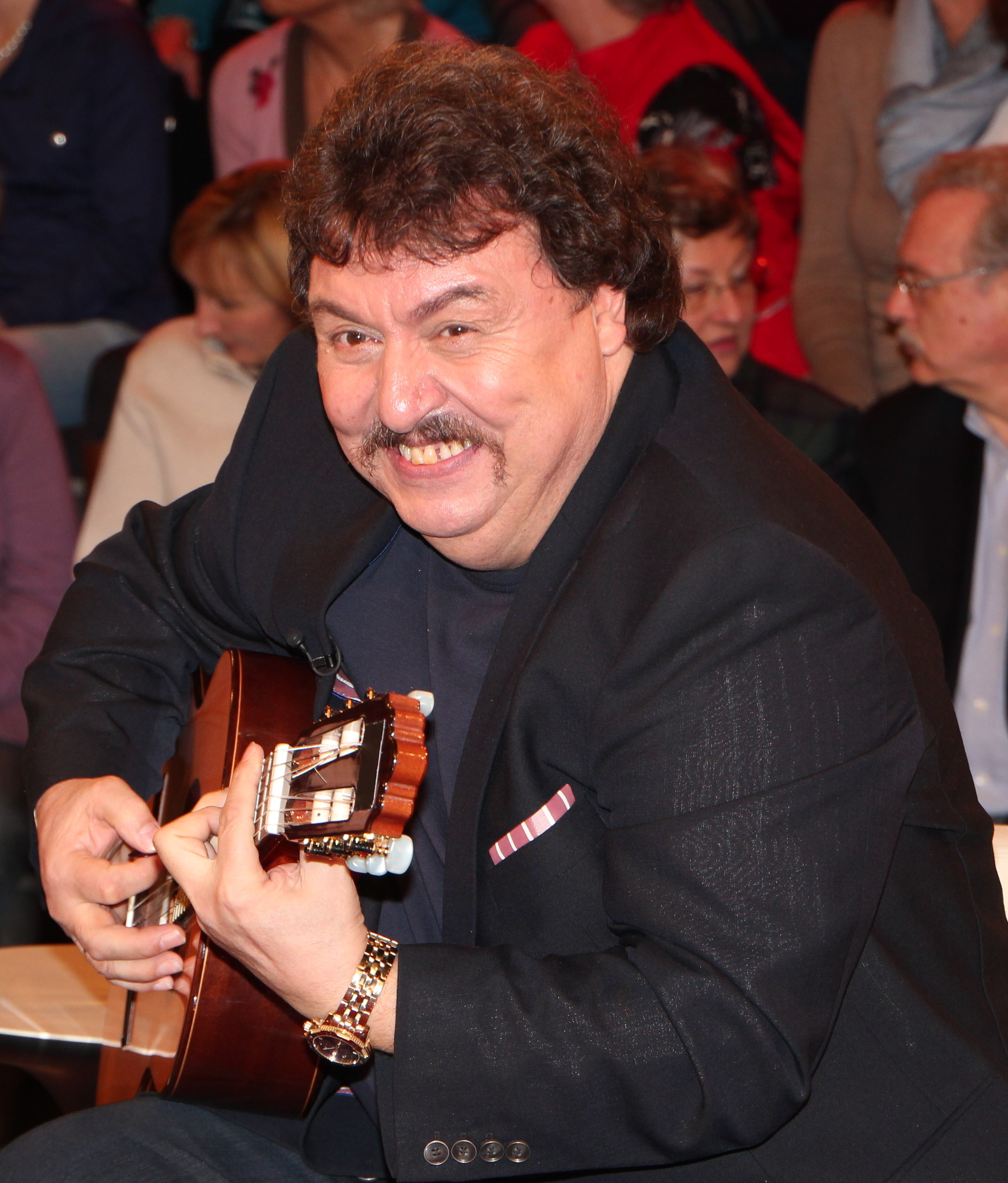
Mentzel in February 2011.

Achim Mentzel (15 July 1946 – 4 January 2016) was a German musician, television presenter and actor. He was best known for hosting his show Achims Hitparade from 1989 to 2006 and for his work with Oliver Kalkofe (Kalkofes Mattscheibe). He released 23 singles and seven albums between 1978 and 2010. He was a member of the cover band, Fritzens Dampferband (German: Fritzen's Steamboat Band), together with Nina Hagen. He appeared in the films The Legend of Paul and Paula (1973) and Der Wixxer (2004), and the television shows Das Amt and Leipzig Homicide.

Mentzel was born in Berlin. He was married four times and had eight children.

Mentzel died on 4 January 2016 in Cottbus, Brandenburg, aged 69. It is believed the cause was a heart attack or stroke.
