= Hans-Joachim Heist =

German actor and comedian (born 1949)

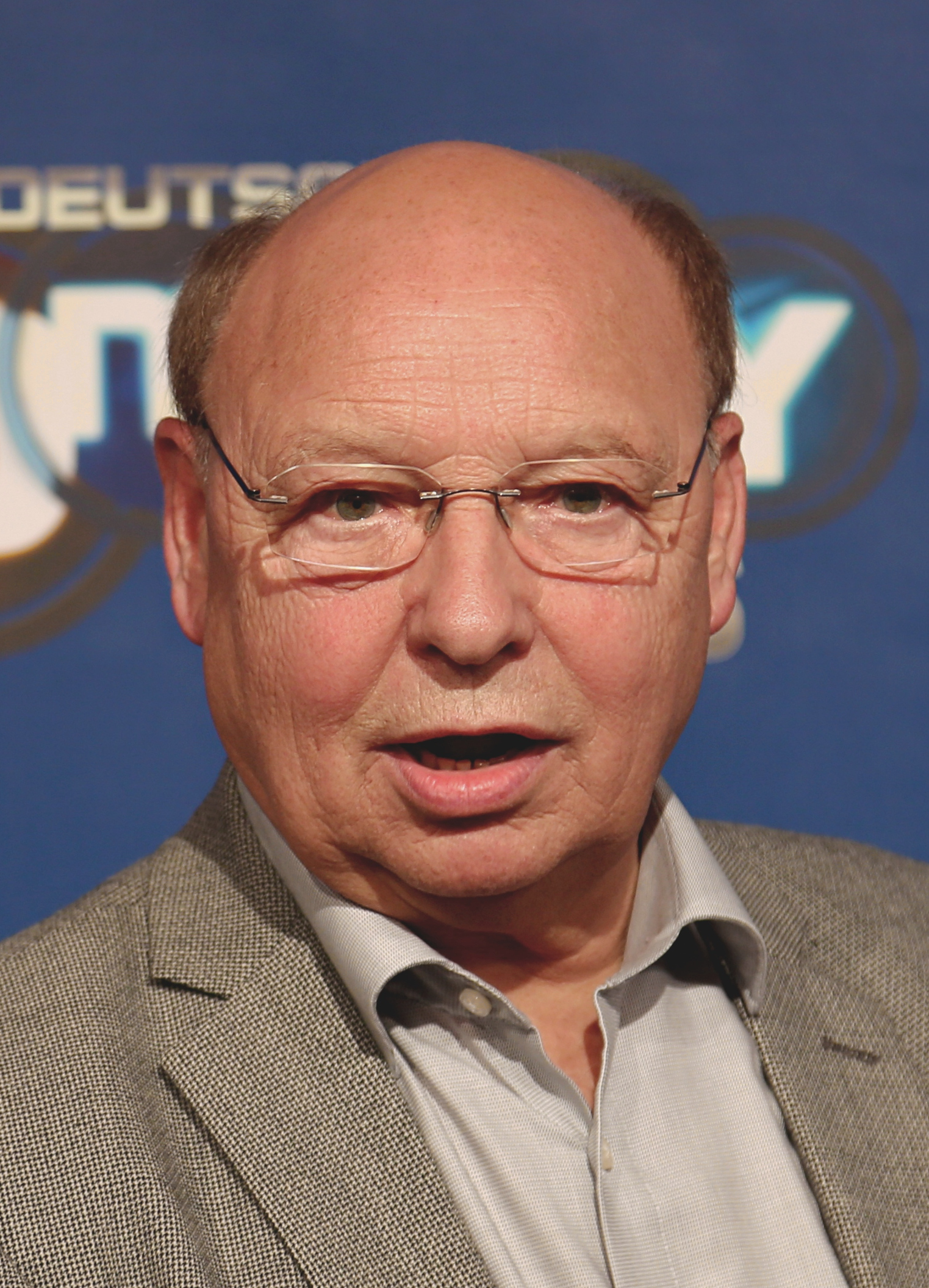
- Heist in 2017
- Born: 11 January 1949 (age 77); Seeheim-Jugenheim, Germany
- Occupations: Actor; Comedian
- Awards: See Awards
- Website: Personal website

Hans-Joachim Heist (born 11 January 1949 in Seeheim-Jugenheim) is a German actor and comedian.

== Life ==
Heist works as actor and comedian in television programs on German broadcasters. In German satire programme heute-show on German broadcaster ZDF he plays the role of "Gernot Hassknecht", a choleric, ranting and screaming television news commentator.

== Filmography ==
- 1982–2006: Ein Fall für zwei (8 episodes)
- 1985–1994: Diese Drombuschs (5 episodes)
- 1992: Das Nest – Motorraddiebe
- 1994: Schwarz greift ein – Mutterfreuden
- 1995: Der Leihmann
- 1997: Das Amt – Das Gerücht
- 1998: Gisbert
- 1999: Die Camper – Die Jagd
- 1999: Die Strandclique
- 1999: Tatort – Der Heckenschütze
- 2000: Paul Is Dead
- 2000: Fandango
- 2000: Ich beiß zurück
- 2000: 7 Tage im Paradies
- 2001: Große Liebe wider Willen
- 2001: Ritas Welt
- 2001: Durch Dick und Dünn
- 2001: Alarm für Cobra 11 – Die Autobahnpolizei
- 2002: If It Don't Fit, Use a Bigger Hammer
- 2002: Tatort – 1000 Tode
- 2002: Nikola
- 2002: Natalie V – Im Spinnennetz des Babystrich
- 2003: Die Camper – Der Sträfling
- 2003–2005: Cologne P.D. (10 episodes)
- 2003: Klassentreffen
- 2004: Wilsberg – Tödliche Freundschaft
- 2004: Liebe hat Vorfahrt
- 2004: Der Staatsanwalt – Henkersmahlzeit
- 2004: Frech wie Janine
- 2004: Pfarrer Braun – Bruder Mord
- 2005: Abschnitt 40 – Sicherstellung
- 2005: Sehnsucht nach Rimini
- 2005: Tatort – Das letzte Rennen
- 2006: Polizeiruf 110 – Die Mutter von Monte Carlo
- 2006: Die Sterneköchin als Schlosser
- 2006: Tatort – Sterben für die Erben
- 2006: Alles Atze
- 2006: Pastewka
- 2006: Bloch
- 2007: Der Lehrer
- 2007: Das Prinzip Lena
- 2008: The Things Between Us
- 2008: Familie Dr. Kleist – Katastrophen
- 2008: No Escape
- 2008: John Rabe
- 2009: Der Mann aus der Pfalz
- 2009: Tatort – Neuland
- 2009: Wer hat Rheinland-Pfalz gemacht?
- since 2009: heute-show
- 2010: A Quiet Life
- 2010: Alles was Recht ist – Sein oder Nichtsein
- 2010: Tiere bis unters Dach (2 episodes)
- 2011: Götter wie wir
- 2012: Sushi in Suhl
- 2013: Kückückskind
- 2013: SOKO 5113 (episodes 521)
- 2013: No-Eared Bunny and Two-Eared Chick
- 2014: "Respekt für meine Rechte"
- 2015: Inside Out (Stimme der Wut for Lewis Black)
- 2015: Löwenzahn
- 2016: Bettys Diagnose, episode 14, "Schonungslos" (figur: Horst Schwadtke)
- 2016: Stuttgart Homicide, episode 169, "Dirty Harry" (figur: Dietmar Notz)
- 2016: Lafer!Lichter!Lecker!
- 2016: Verliebt in Amsterdam

== Stage works ==
- 1985: Komm raus aus dem Schrank as Willy Briggs
- 1989: Sextett as Dennys
- 1991: Doppelt Leben hält länger as Stanley Gardner
- 1991: Der arme Cyrano as Ragueneaou
- 1995: Der fröhliche Weinberg as Karl Eismayer
- 1996: Ein Traum von Hochzeit as Tom
- 1996: Sommernachtstraum as Schreiner Schnock / Philostrat
- 2001: Dreigroschenoper as Mathias Münz
- 2004: Im Name der Rose as Severin
- 2004: Die drei Musketiere als Bonacieux
- 2006–2011: Der Kontrabass as Kontrabassist
- 2006–2016: Die Sternstunde des Josef Bieder as Requisiteur
- 2007–2009: Allein in der Sauna as Kalle König
- 2008–2016: Noch'n Gedicht der große Heinz Erhardt Abend as Heinz Erhardt
- 2012–2013: Der Geizige as Kommissar
- 2013–2016: Das Hassknecht Prinzip – in zwölf Schritten zum Choleriker
- 2017– : Hassknecht LIVE – Jetzt wird's persönlich

== Awards ==
- 1999: Fachmedienpreis in "Comedy" for "James" in "Dinner for one“
- 2009, 2010, 2011, 2012: Deutscher Comedypreis for member in "ZDF – heute show“
- 2010 und 2014: Deutscher Fernsehpreis in category "Beste Comedy" for "ZDF – heute show“
- 2010: Adolf-Grimme-Preis for "ZDF – heute show“
- 2012: Hanns-Joachim-Friedrichs-Preis für Oliver Welke und sein Team
- 2013: Die Holzisch Latern des Karnevalvereins Dieburg, für besondere Dienste um das Brauchtum.
- 2014: Bambi Award for "ZDF – heute show“
- 2015: Ehrenbrief des Landes Hessen
- 2017: Goldene Kamera 2017 for "ZDF – heute show“
- 2017: Deutscher Comedypreis, Beste Satire-Show: „ZDF – heute show“
