= Lutz van der Horst =

German TV presenter and comedian (born 1975)

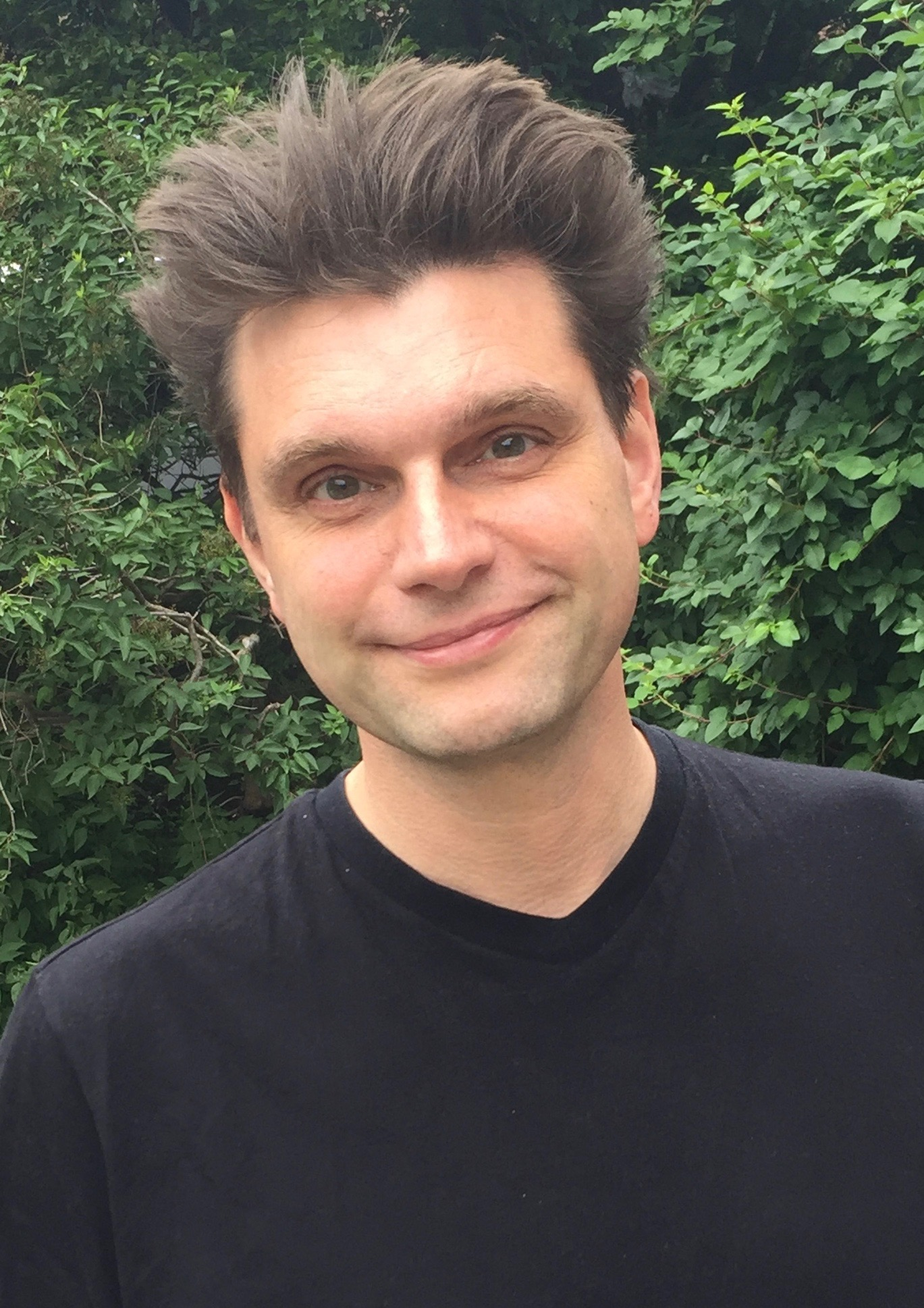
- Van der Horst in 2017
- Born: 20 August 1975 (age 51); Cologne, West Germany
- Occupations: Television presenter; comedian
- Years active: 2000–present

Lutz van der Horst (born 20 August 1975) is a German television presenter and comedian. He is most known for being a political satire reporter on the heute-show.

== Biography ==
Born in Cologne, van der Horst studied English studies and German studies at University of Cologne. He then initially worked as a speaker and author for radio, such as appearing on the "Bürgerfunk" show on Radio Cologne, where he also worked on the youth magazine "Mehr von mehr". Then he did an internship at 1LIVE radio station.

Then from 2000 working on television, he worked as a gag writer for the Cologne-based production company 'Brainpool' like Die Wochenshow, Rent a Pocher and TV total. He then worked as a freelance writer for other comedy shows such as Switch Reloaded (versions of the Australian TV series Fast Forward), comedy sketch show Sechserpack and Harald Schmidt.

From December 2001, Van der Horst also appeared for the first time in front of the camera. On the ProSieben network Show TV total, he appeared in a pink rabbit costume as a bubble hare blowing a carrot.

Together with Manuel Butt and Thomas Rogel, who later was also a writer for the heute-show (Today show) in 2008, they founded the office N_{2}O Comedy in 2008. Note N_{2}O is the chemical formula for nitrous oxide.

Van der Horst has also been cast member of the German late-night satirical television program Heute-show since 2009. He is nicknamed the "Political Terror".

Then from 2011 to 2012, he and Senna Gammour hosted the quiz show Iss oder quizz (based on the American show Deal with It) on the ZDF channel.

In 2012, he worked as a reporter in Monika Grubers boulevard satire Leute, Leute! on German public broadcast ZDF. Since 2013 he with (memory trainer) Christiane Stenger have been hosting Wie werd' ich …? (or How will I ...?) on German broadcaster ZDFneo. The show tries to explain scientific phenomena with humor.

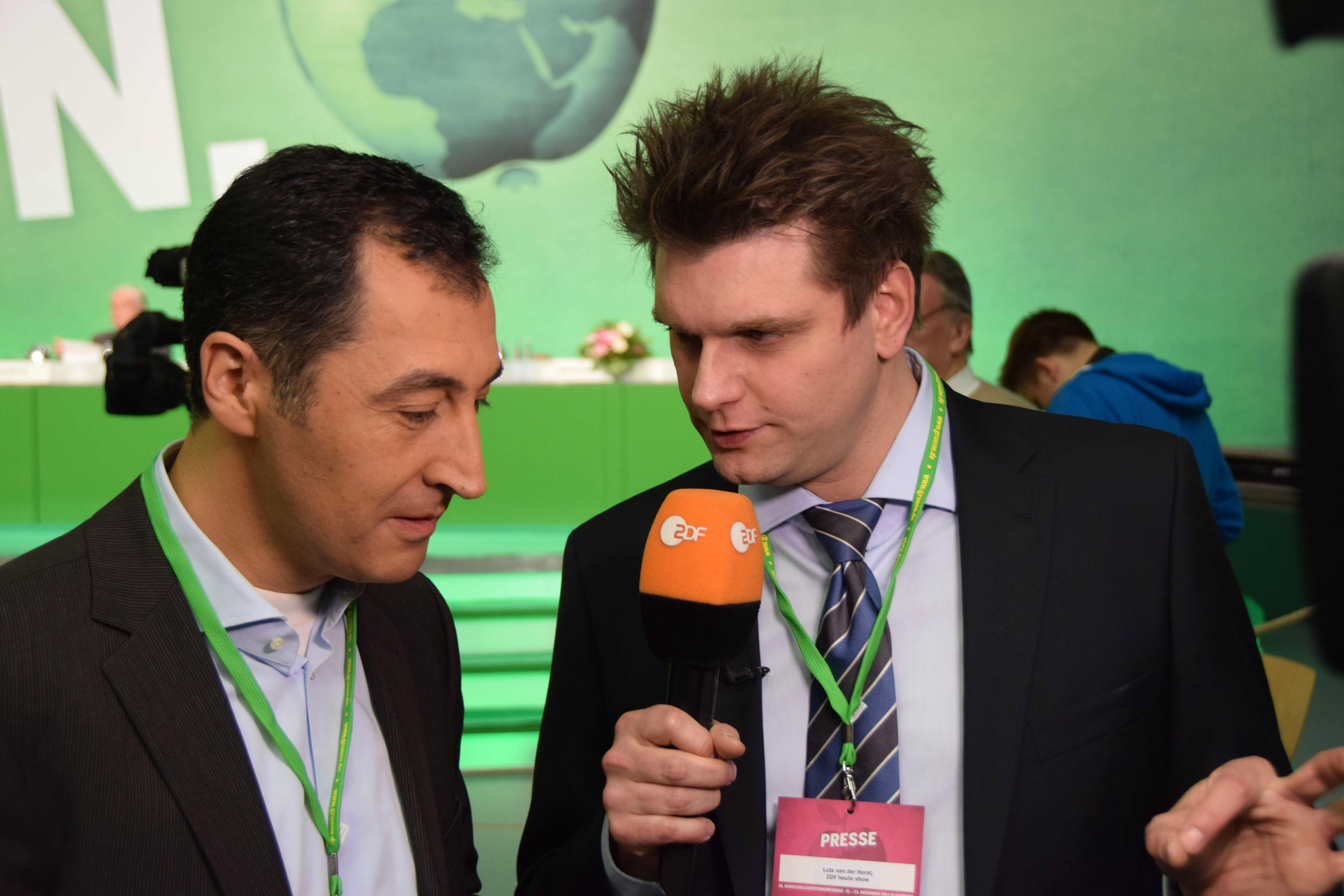
Van der Horst interviewing Cem Özdemir, 2014

On the radio 1LIVE and on stage, he has a stand-up comedian persona named 'Jimmy Breuer' Germany's worst comedian, who has deliberately wrong punch times at the wrong time, and is supposed to be the exact opposite of a skilled joke professional. He has toured with 'Jimmy Breuer' such as 36 shows in 2011.

Since September 2016, he plays the prison supervisor "Frosch" in Johann Strauss's operetta Die Fledermaus at the Hessisches Staatstheater Wiesbaden.

In November 2016, the AfD in Bayern used his face for a campaign poster, for the cancellation of TV broadcasting fees, without his permission. He used his position as satire-external reporter on the "Heute Show" to criticize the political party. He tried to sue them for 5000 euros in damages, but eventually got seven euros and ten cents from members outside the party congress.

In 2018, a new SAT.1 show was created, "Hotel Herzklopfen - Late in love!" (based on a Belgian show) presented by Van der Horst, Sarah Mangione and Daniel Boschmann.

== Personal life ==
He lives in Ehrenfeld, Cologne and is a member of the SPD in the context of a satirical heute-show contribution in 2016, which he has renounced since. He supports equality of lesbians and gays. He is a big fan of horror films and has a very extensive collection of zombie and cannibal films from the late 1970s.

== Filmography ==
=== Film ===
Year	Title	Role
1998	Dark	Tim Fischer
2019	Under ConTroll: Possessed by a Monster	Arabello

=== TV ===
Year	Title	Role	Notes
2011	TV total	Jimmy Breuer	TV series, 1 episode
2014	Löwenzahn	Millionär	TV series, 1 episode

== Awards ==
- 2007: Deutscher Comedypreis as writer at Switch Reloaded (category best sketch-show)
- 2010: Adolf-Grimme-Preis as member and writer of heute-show (category entertainment)
- 2010: Deutscher Fernsehpreis as member and writer of heute-show (category best comedy)
- 2010: Deutscher Comedypreis as member and writer of heute-show (category best comedy-Show)
- 2011: Deutscher Comedypreis as member and writer of heute-show (category best comedy-Show)
- 2012: Deutscher Comedypreis as member and writer of heute-show (category best comedy-Show)
- 2014: Deutscher Fernsehpreis as member and writer of heute-show (category best Comedy)
- 2016: Goldene Henne as member and writer of heute-show (category politics)
- 2017: Goldene Kamera as member and writer by heute-show (category best satire-show)
