= Oliver Welke =

German television presenter and comedian (born 1966)

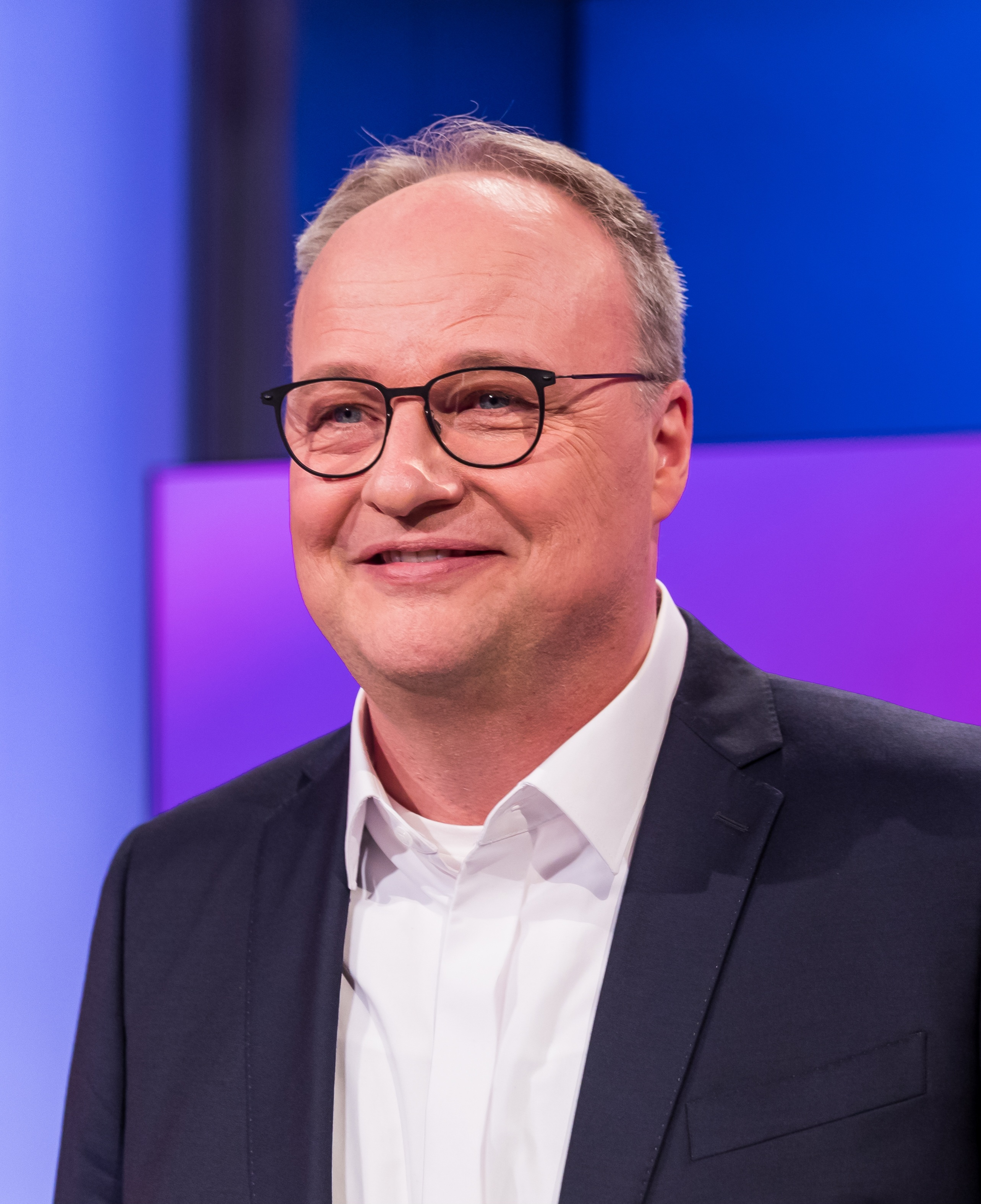
- Welke in 2024
- Born: 19 April 1966 (age 60); Bielefeld, West Germany
- Occupations: Television presenter, journalist, satirist, comedian, voice actor
- Years active: 1996–present
- Website: oliverwelke.de

Oliver Welke (born 19 April 1966) is a German television presenter, journalist, satirist, comedian and voice actor.

== Biography ==
Welke was born in Bielefeld and studied journalism at the University of Münster, graduating in 1993. He then worked in a number of fields and eventually became a rather well-known sport journalist and presenter. Together with Oliver Kalkofe, whom he met while working for a public radio station, he provided the German voices for Mystery Science Theater 3000: The Movie (as Crow T. Robot) and the British comedy show Little Britain, and also co-wrote the script for the crime film parody Der WiXXer. Since May 2009, Welke has been the host of the satirical heute-show on German public broadcaster ZDF, which is commonly viewed as a German adaptation of The Daily Show.

Welke is married and has two sons. He is involved in several charities such as Terre des hommes.

== Filmography ==
- 2004: Der Wixxer
- 2006–2009: Schillerstraße (TV series)
- 2007: Neues vom Wixxer
- 2012: Götter wie Wir (TV series)

== CDs ==
- Kalk & Welk (together with Oliver Kalkofe), 2000, Frühstyxradio (Rough Trade Records)
- Kalk & Welk: Zwei Engel der Barmherzigkeit (together with Oliver Kalkofe), 2000, Frühstyxradio (Rough Trade Records)

== Books ==
- Der Wixxer (together with Bastian Pastewka and Oliver Kalkofe), 2007, Vgs, ISBN 978-3-8025-1744-0
- heute-show: Das Buch (together with Morten Kühne), 2011, Rowohlt Verlag, ISBN 978-3-87134-699-6
- Frank Bsirske macht Urlaub auf Krk – Deutsche Helden privat (together with Dietmar Wischmeyer), 2013, Rowohlt Verlag, ISBN 978-3871347528

== Awards ==
- 2001: Deutscher Fernsehpreis (German Television Award)
- 2004: German Comedy Award as part of team 7 Tage, 7 Köpfe
- 2007: German Comedy Award as part of team Frei Schnauze XXL
- 2009: German Comedy Award as part of team heute-show
- 2010: Grimme Award as part of team heute-show
- 2010: German Comedy Award as part of team heute-show
- 2010: Deutscher Fernsehpreis in the category Best Comedy as part of team heute-show
- 2011: German Comedy Award as part of team heute-show (best comedy show)
- 2012: Hanns-Joachim-Friedrichs-Award for television journalism for him and his team of heute-show
- 2012: German Comedy Award as part of team heute-show (best comedy show)
- 2013: Bayerischer Fernsehpreis as presenter of the heute-show
- 2014: Deutscher Fernsehpreis as presenter of the FIFA WM 2014, for the best sports telecast
- 2014: Bambi in the category Comedy for the heute-show
- 2014: Hans-Oelschläger-Preis for the heute-show
