= Endenich =

- Quarter of Bonn
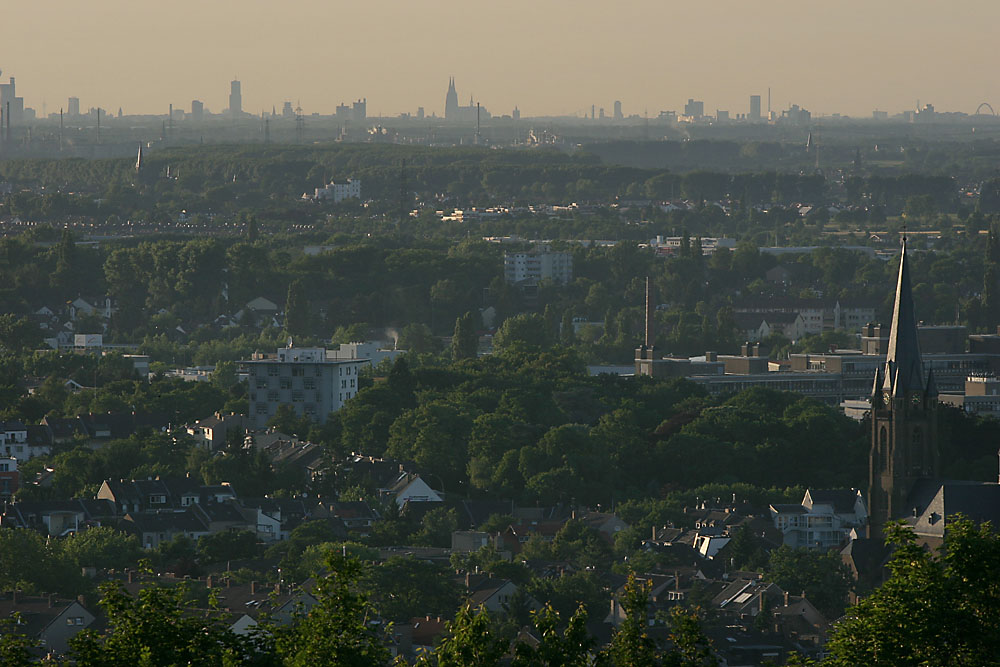
- Interactive map of Endenich
- Location within Germany Location within North Rhine-Westphalia
- Coordinates: 50°43′30.5″N 7°4′22.2″E
- Country: Germany
- State: North Rhine-Westphalia
- City: Bonn
- Borough: Bonn

Population (2020-12-31)
  - Total: 12,650
- Time zone: UTC+01:00 (CET)
  - Summer (DST): UTC+02:00 (CEST)
- Postal codes: 53121
- Dialling codes: 0228
- Vehicle registration: BN
- Website: www.endenich-online.de

Endenich is a neighborhood in the western part of Bonn, Germany. Before 1904 it was an independent municipality. The village of Endenich was founded in the 8th century, and was first mentioned in 804 as Antiniche. Today, about 12,000 people live in Endenich.

== Sights ==
The composer and pianist Robert Schumann lived the last two years of his life in the mental clinic Richarz'sche Heilanstalt on Magdalenenstraße (on today's Sebastianstraße), where he died on July 29, 1856. The former clinic now houses the Schumannhaus Bonn, a music library and museum.

In the northern part is the Max Planck Institute for Radio Astronomy which was opened in 1972.

The improvisational theatre Springmaus, founded by Bill Mockridge, is located in Endenich. Well-known comedians such as Bernhard Hoëcker, Dirk Bach and Bastian Pastewka have performed at this theatre.

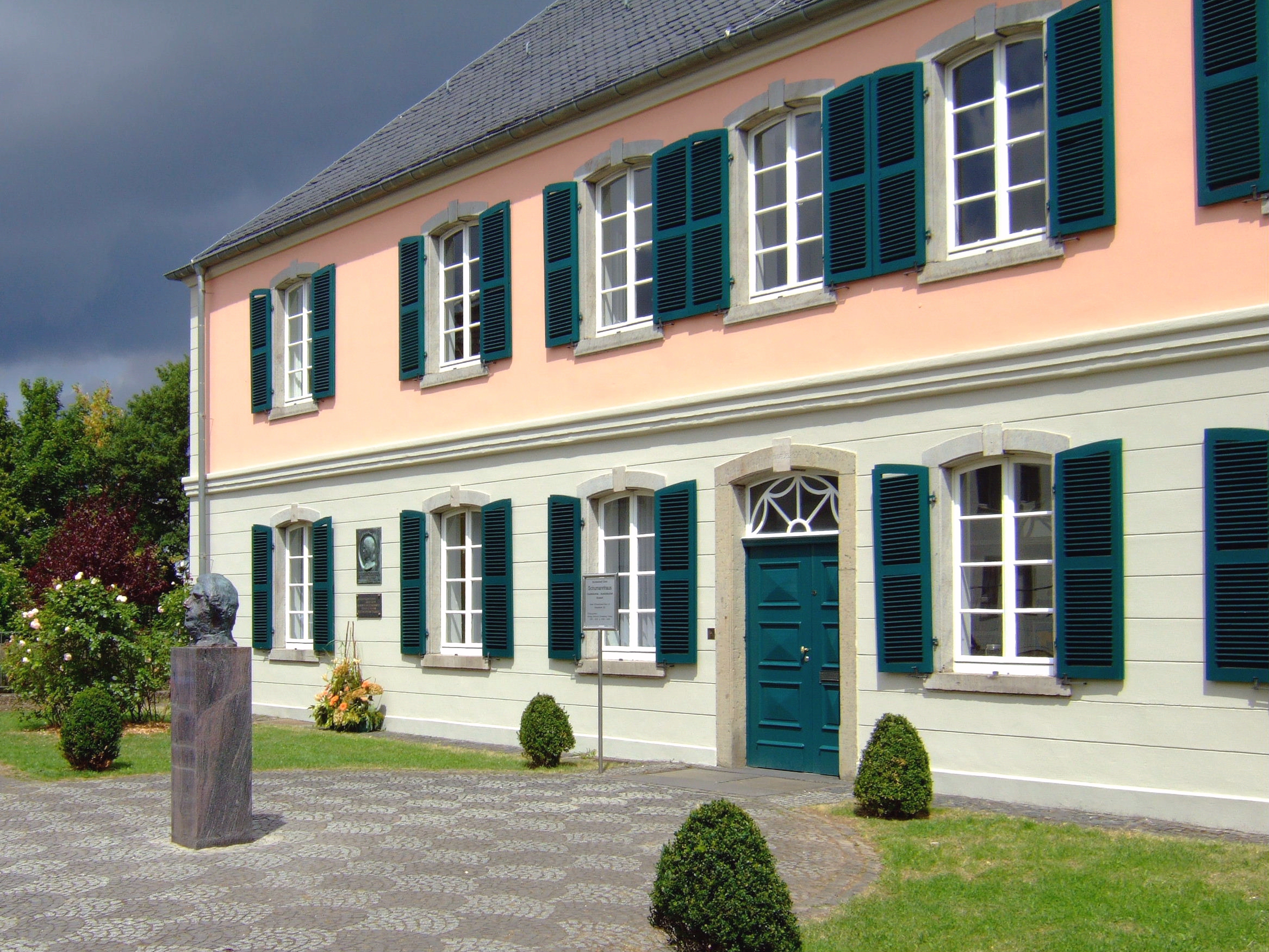
Schumannhaus, the former Richarz'sche Heilanstalt

Endenich is a cultural district of Bonn. It features restaurants, a retro cinema, pubs, and an event location that hosts concerts and shows nearly every night.

== Concentration camp ==
A Benedictine convent in Endenich was confiscated by the Nazis in 1941 and used as a holding camp for nearly 500 Jews and other persons, who were later deported to Auschwitz and Theresienstadt. As of 2026 there is a memorial on the site to those murdered in the Nazi genocide.
