= Der Wixxer =

- Theatrical release poster
- Directed by: Tobi Baumann
- Written by: Oliver Kalkofe; Oliver Welke; Bastian Pastewka
- Produced by: Christian Becker; David Groenewold; Anita Schneider
- Starring: Oliver Kalkofe; Bastian Pastewka
- Cinematography: Gerhard Schirlo
- Edited by: Ueli Christen; Marco Pav D'Auria
- Music by: Andreas Grimm
- Production company: Rat Pack Filmproduktion
- Distributed by: Falcom Media
- Release date: 20 May 2004
- Running time: 85 minutes
- Language: German

Der Wixxer (English: The Trixxer; a reference to German "Wichser", wanker) is a 2004 German parody of comparable German crime films based on works by Edgar Wallace, especially the film Der Hexer (1964) – a German adaptation of The Ringer.

The film was directed by Tobi Baumann and written by Oliver Kalkofe, Oliver Welke and Bastian Pastewka. It is about two policemen, Inspector Very Long (Pastewka) and Chief Inspector Even Longer (Kalkofe) who must find the Wixxer, a gangster who wants to take over London's crime world.

== Plot ==
The film begins at BlackWhite castle, one of the last castles in Black-and-white located in the United Kingdom. Residing there is the Earl of Cockwood (Thomas Fritsch), a notorious gangster. At some point, an East German tourist couple from Bitterfeld (Anke Engelke and Olli Dittrich) gets lost in the woods and witnesses a murder: the Monk with the whip gets run over by a truck. At the wheel: The Wixxer, an evil gangster who wears a skull mask and wants to take over London's crime scene. To do that he arranges for the death of many of the current gangsters.

Scotland Yard sends its – allegedly – best man, Chief Inspector Even Longer. Since the Wixxer killed Even Longer's partner Rather Short (Thomas Heinze), a new partner is assigned: Very Long. They start to investigate and suspect the Earl of Cockwood. However, the Earl (who officially raises pugs and unofficially smuggles girl groups, amongst other things) is affected by the Wixxer's ambitions as well.

Their investigations bring the two inspectors back to London where they meet the dubious Harry Smeerlap (Lars Rudolph, pun with German “Schmierlappen” = creep, greasy rag) and his men, who work for Cockwood. Smeerlap tries to conceal his racketeerings, but Very Long and Even Longer can finally arrest him. At the end they are able to finally identify the Wixxer: it is none other than Rather Short who killed the original Wixxer and assumed his identity.

== Background ==
The film is based on a radio play that Oliver Kalkofe (together with Oliver Welke) performed in the 1990s during his time as a radio host at radio ffn.

The film was shot mostly in the Czech Republic, i.e. in Hostivar studios, the Kladnice mine and around Prague.

Three actors (Grit Boettcher as a waitress, Eva Ebner as Miss Drykant and Wolfgang Völz as Sir John) who appear in this film, also appeared in some of the original Wallace films made in the 60s. Joachim Fuchsberger was approached for a role but, after hearing the title, disgustedly declined. However, after seeing the film on DVD, he agreed to appear in the sequel, Neues vom Wixxer (2007) (english title "The Vexxer").

== Music ==
The title song "The Wizard" was performed by Right Said Fred and Anke Engelke (as her character Doris Dubinsky). "The Wizard" was originally performed by Madness of whom Kalkofe is a big fan.

== Release ==
The movie premiered on 10 May 2004 in Munich and was released on 20 May 2004. On its opening weekend, it grossed approximately $4,112,430. The film ended its theatrical run with approx. 1,9 million viewers.

== Cast ==
- Oliver Kalkofe as Chief Inspector Even Longer / Woman in dungeon
- Bastian Pastewka as Inspector Very Long / Flower seller
- Thomas Fritsch as Earl of Cockwood
- Tanja Wenzel as Miss Jennifer Pennymarket (Her name is a pun between Miss Moneypenny and German supermarket chain Penny Markt)
- Wolfgang Völz as Sir John (the name is a regular character from the original Edgar Wallace-movies)
- Olli Dittrich as Dieter Dubinski
- Christoph Maria Herbst as Butler Alfons Hatler (an obvious parody of Adolf Hitler)
- Eva Ebner as Miss Drykant
- Thomas Heinze as Rather Short
- Anke Engelke as Doris Dubinski
- Antoine Monot, Jr. as "Deaf Jack"
- Oliver Welke as Doctor Brinkman (His name is a reference to Dr. Brinkmann from The Black Forest Clinic)
- Lars Rudolph as Harry Smeerlap
- Andre Meyer as Pommeroy
- Daniel Steiner as Fitzgerald
- Cameo appearances: Günther Jauch, Achim Mentzel, Wildecker Herzbuben, No Angels

== Critical reception ==
The score by Andreas Grimm was awarded in the Best Music category at the 2005 German Film Critics Association Awards.
