= Christian Ehring =

German presenter and comedian

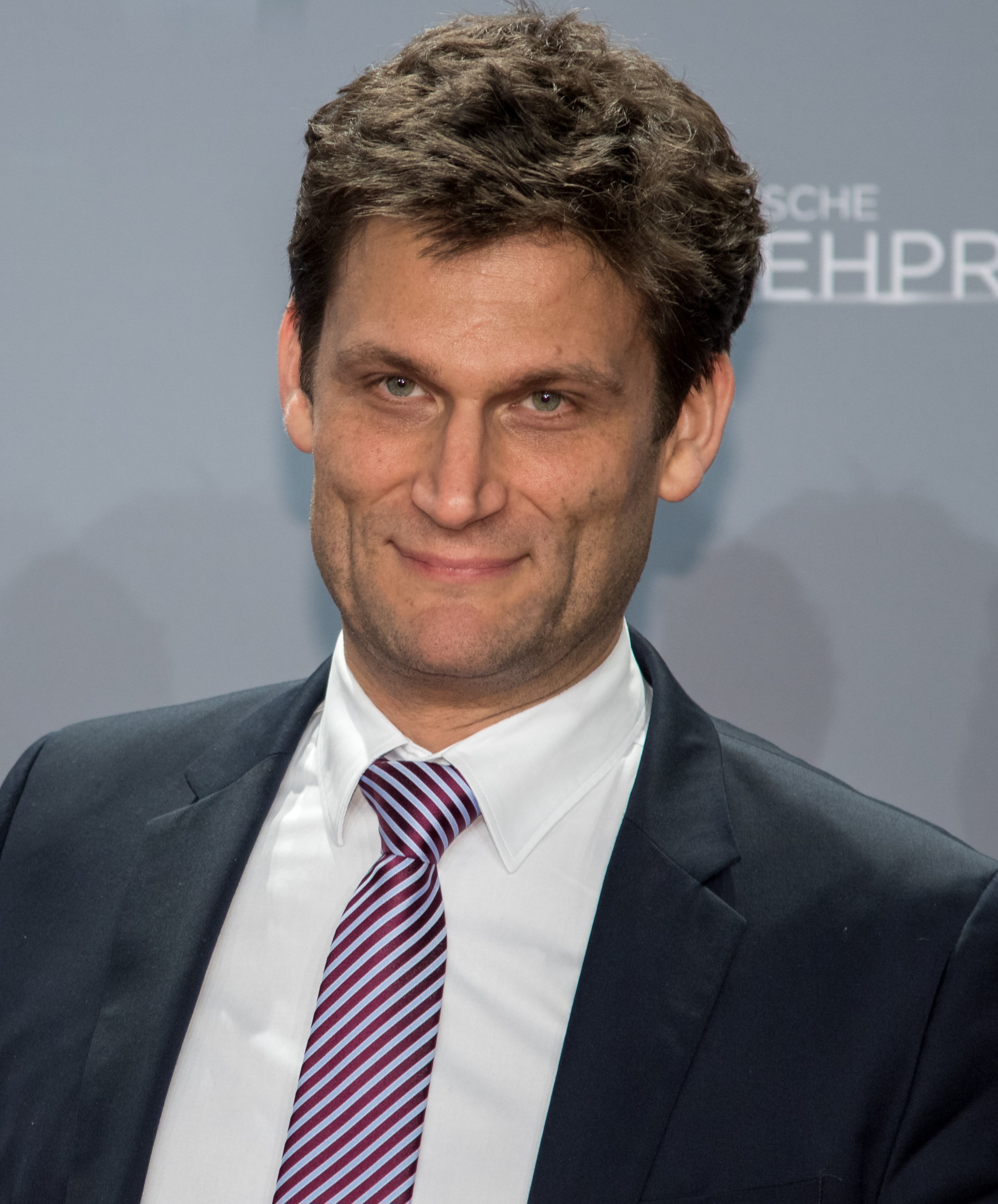
- Ehring in 2018
- Born: 18 September 1972 (age 54); Duisburg, North Rhine-Westphalia, West Germany
- Occupations: Comedian; Presenter; Author

Christian Ehring (born 18 September 1972) is a German television presenter, kabarett artist, and author.

== Life ==
Ehring works as a comedian at German theatres, and has appeared on a variety of television programs broadcast by German outlets. Since 2011 he has been the presenter of political satire show extra 3 on public broadcasting in Germany. He has written several books. He lives in Düsseldorf, and has two children.

== Works ==
- 1998: Generation XXL. (Die Scheinheiligen) CD, Con Anima
- 2004: Anchorman. Ein Nachrichtensprecher sieht rot. CD, Con Anima
- 2007: Couch. Ein Heimatabend. (Das Kom(m)ödchen) DVD with Heiko Seidel, Maike Kühl and Christian Ehring
- 2010: Sushi. Ein Requiem. (Das Kom(m)ödchen) DVD with Heiko Seidel, Maike Kühl and Christian Ehring
- 2013: Freaks. Eine Abrechnung. (Das Kom(m)ödchen) DVD with Heiko Seidel, Maike Kühl and Christian Ehring
- 2016: Keine weiteren Fragen CD, Con Anima
- 2017: Keine weiteren Fragen. Doppel-CD, Con Anima

== Awards ==
- 2004: Handelsblatt-Förderpreis Sprungbrett
- 2004: Westspitzen-Preis (Sparte Kabarett)
- 2005: Goldener Rostocker Koggenzieher
- 2009: Leipziger Löwenzahn (Ensemble des Kom(m)ödchens)
- 2009: Deutscher Comedypreis 2009 (for member of heute-show)
- 2009: Adolf-Grimme-Preis 2010 (for member of heute-show)
- 2010: Deutscher Comedypreis 2010 (for member of heute-show)
- 2012: Deutscher Comedypreis 2012 (for member of heute-show)
- 2016: Nordrhein-Westfälischer Kleinkunstpreis "Bocholter Pepperoni"
- 2017: Berliner Kabarettpreis der EDDI
- 2017: Düsseldorfer des Jahres in category culture
