= Margie Kinsky =

Italian actress (born 1958)

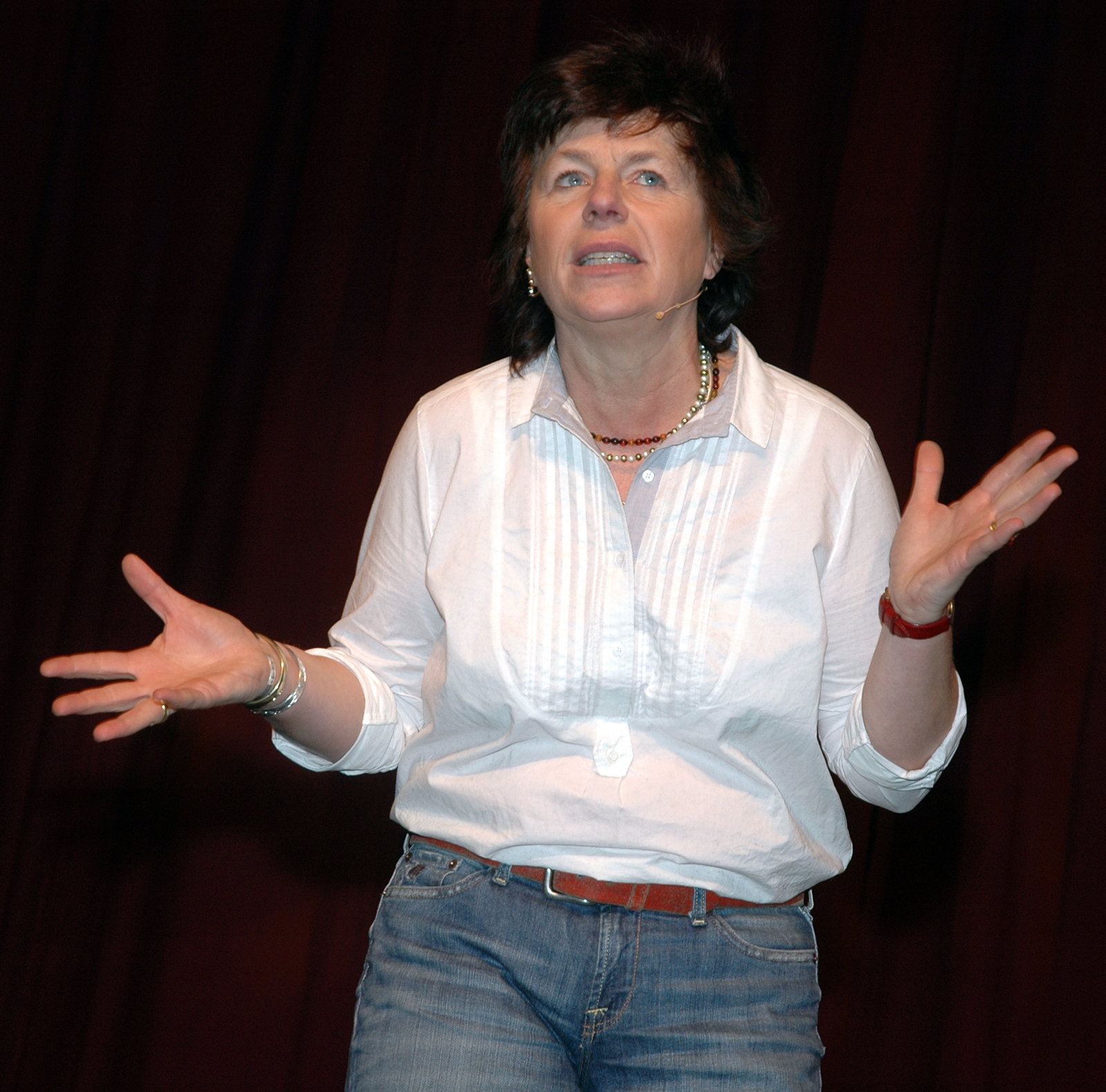
- Kinsky in 2012
- Born: Maria Grazia Alice Eleonora Kinsky; 17 January 1958 (age 68); Rome, Italy
- Occupation: Actress
- Spouse: Bill Mockridge
- Children: 6, including Luke Mockridge
- Website: margie-und-bill.de

Maria Grazia Alice Eleonora Kinsky-Mockridge (born 21 April 1958), commonly known as Margie Kinsky, is an Italian actress and cabaret artist who works in Germany.

== Biography ==
Kinsky was born in Rome to Genilde Kinsky (Genilda Kinská) of the former Bohemian Kinsky family and Italian father Filippo Dozzi. Through her mother, who was born in Czechoslovakia in 1925, Kinsky is related to the former Czech Foreign Minister Karel Schwarzenberg. She is also the great-grandniece of Bertha von Suttner. In Rome, she attended Deutsche Schule Rom. After graduating from high school in 1979, she moved to Germany and studied Romance languages at the University of Bonn. In 1983, she married actor and director Bill Mockridge. Together they have six sons, all of whom have dual citizenship (Italian and Canadian).

All of the couple's sons follow their parents' example and work. They include film and television director (Nick Mockridge), entrepreneur and coach (Matthew "Matt" Mockridge, ex-boy band Part Six), comedian (Luke Mockridge), musician (Leonardo "Lenny" Mockridge) and actors Jeremy Mockridge and Liam Mockridge.
