= Abdelkarim =

Given name

Abdelkarim is a Muslim given name, variant of Abdul Karim, meaning "servant of the Most Gracious One" (which means "servant of Allah").

Notable people with the name include:

== People ==
- Abdelkarim al-Kabariti (born 1949), prime minister of Jordan from 4 February 1996 to 9 March 1997
- Awatef Abdelkarim (born 1931), Egyptian composer of contemporary classical music
- Raouf Abdelkarim (born 1978), Egyptian male artistic gymnast, representing his nation at international competitions
- Abdelkarim Hussein Mohamed Al-Nasser, alleged member and suspected leader of the terrorist organization Saudi Hizballah
- Abdelkarim Badjadja (born 1945), Algerian archivist and historian
- Abdelkarim Bendjemil (born 1959), former Algerian handball player
- Abdelkarim Ghellab (born 1919), Moroccan political journalist, cultural commentator, and novelist
- Abdelkarim El Hadrioui (born 1972), former Moroccan footballer
- Abdelkarim El Haouari (born 1993), Moroccan fencer
- Abdelkarim Harouni, Tunisian politician
- Abdelkarim Hassan (born 1993), Qatari footballer
- Abdelkarim Jouaiti (born 1962), Moroccan novelist
- Abdelkarim Kissi (born 1980), Moroccan football midfielder
- Abdelkarim Krimau, nicknamed "Krimau", (born 1955), Moroccan former professional football (soccer) player
- Abdelkarim Nafti (born 1981), Tunisian football player
- Abdelkarim Qasim (1914–1963), nationalist Iraqi Army brigadier, seized power in a 1958 coup d'état, eliminating the Iraqi monarchy
- Abdelkarim Tabbal (born 1931), Moroccan poet
- Abdelkarim Zbidi (born 1950), Tunisian politician

== See also ==
Media related to Abdelkarim (given name) at Wikimedia Commons
