= Abdelkarim Badjadja =

Algerian archivist and historian

Abdelkrim Badjadja (March 26, 1945 – January 31, 2022) was an Algerian archivist and historian. He contributed greatly to the development of the National Archives of Algeria (Archives Nationales d'Algerie) and the preservation and dissemination of Algerian history. He published several works on the history of Algeria and the archival profession in Arabic and French.

== Education ==
Born in Constantine, Badjadja attended the University of Constantine, Algeria where he studied history and geography. He received his license in 1972 and his DEA in 1974.

== Career ==
Badjadja served as the Director of the Archive Department of Constantine from 1974 to 1991, and then Director of the National Library of Algeria from 1991 to 1992. He was the Director General of the National Archives of Algeria (Archives Nationales d'Algerie) from 1992 to 2001. He currently serves as the Consulting Archivist at the Information and Research Center, at the Presidency in Abu Dhabi, United Arab Emirates. He was also the director of the Archives de Wilaya de Constantine.

From November 1986 to March 1987, he was placed under town arrest restrictions but no official reasons were ever given.

He died in Constantine on January 31, 2022, aged 76.

== Selected bibliography ==
- "The Application of Senatus Consulte (1863-1887) in Constantine," National Archives 3, 1975
- "The Political Life in Constantine (1935-1940) Using the Archives of North African Liaison Services in the Wilaya of Constantine," National Archives 6, 1977
- "Finding Methods in Archives Centre," CIRTA Magazine 1, 1979
- "The Andalusian Music, History and Theory," The Roch 3 1985
- Investigation Over the Standard of Life of the Moslem Population in Constantine in 1936, 1989
- "The Occupation of Expert in Archives Administration as a Liberal Profession," Arab Archives Magazine 15, 1990
- Maps of the Ancient Tribes in Eastern Algeria, 1863–1887, 1990
- "The Struggle of Constantine, 1836–1837," Quire of Tunsis 157–158, 1991
- "Moslem Registry Office in Constantine in 1256 H. (1840–41)," Madjallat El-Tarikh 25, 1992
- "Italian Associations in Eastern Algeria from 1906 to 1939," Mograbin History Magazine 67, 1992
- "The History of the Ancient Town of Constantine," Madjallat El-Tarikh 25, 1992
- "Administrative Archives Management, Poor Basic Structure Coping with Huge Quantity of Useless Papers," Arab Archives Magazine 16, 1992
- "Three Documents over Maritime Relationship between Algeria and Villefranche (Comite de Nice) in XVIIth and XVIIIth Centuries," Mograbin History Magazine 67–68, 1992
- "The Building Up and Promoting of Archives Centres," Arab Archives Magazine 17, 1997
