= Die Komiker =

- Country of origin: Germany

Die Komiker is a German television series in Bavarian dialect.

== See also ==
- List of German television series
