= Luke Mockridge =

Germany-based comedian

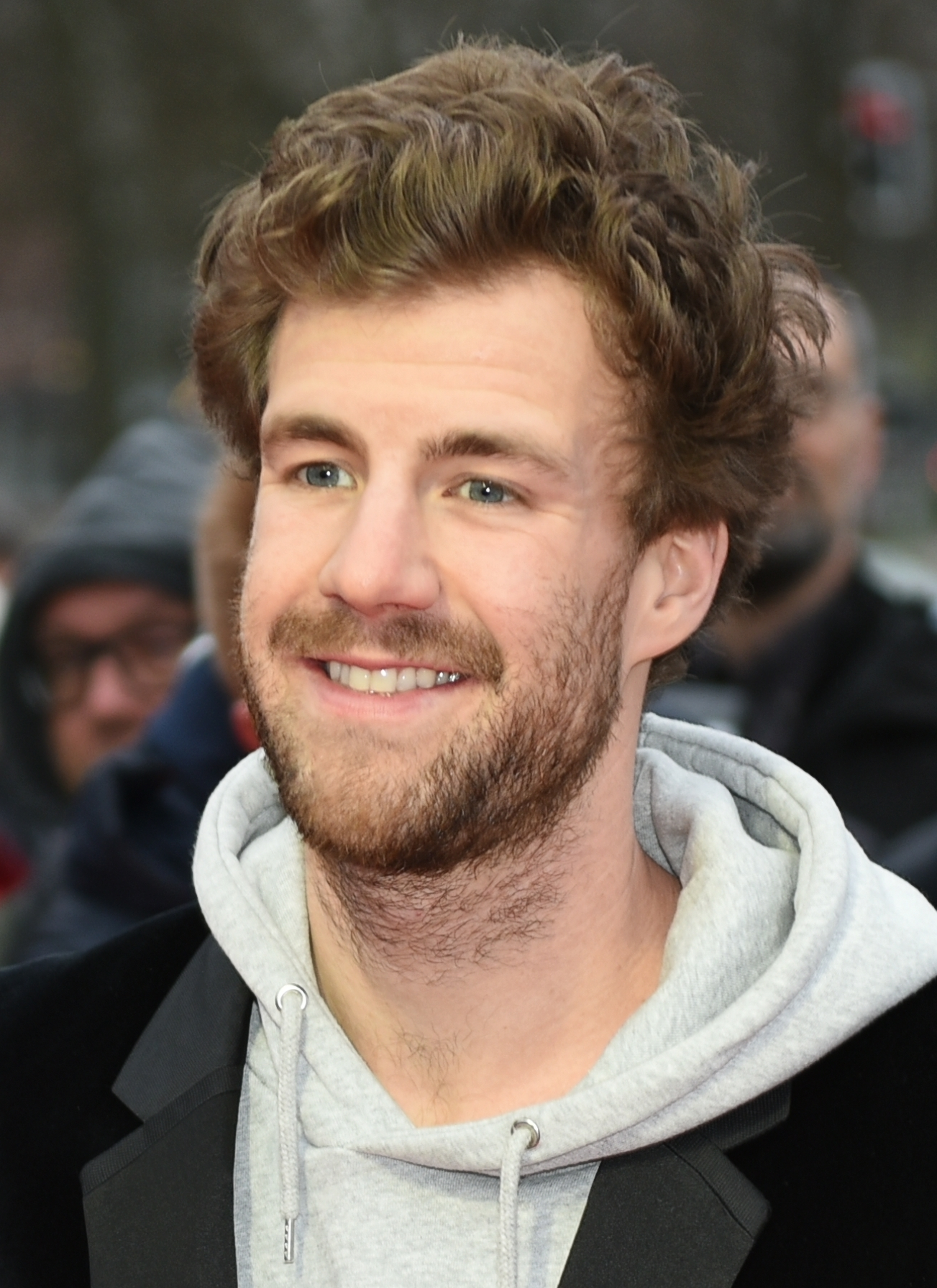
- Mockridge in 2019
- Born: Lucas Edward Britton Mockridge; 21 March 1989 (age 37); Bonn, West Germany
- Parent(s): Bill Mockridge; Margie Kinsky
- Relatives: Jeremy Mockridge

Comedy career
- Years active: 2012–2021; 2022–present
- Medium: Stand-up; television
- Citizenship: Italy; Canada
- Website: luke-mockridge.de

Lucas Edward Britton Mockridge (born 21 March 1989) is a comedian based in Germany who holds Canadian and Italian citizenship.

== Early life ==
Mockridge is son of the Canadian actor and comedian Bill Mockridge and the Italian actress and comedian Margie Kinsky. He was raised in Endenich and has two older and three younger brothers. His siblings are all involved in the show business, as directors, musicians, singers, actors and models. One of his brothers is actor Jeremy Mockridge. Luke Mockridge lives in Cologne. His godfather was Dirk Bach.

== Career ==
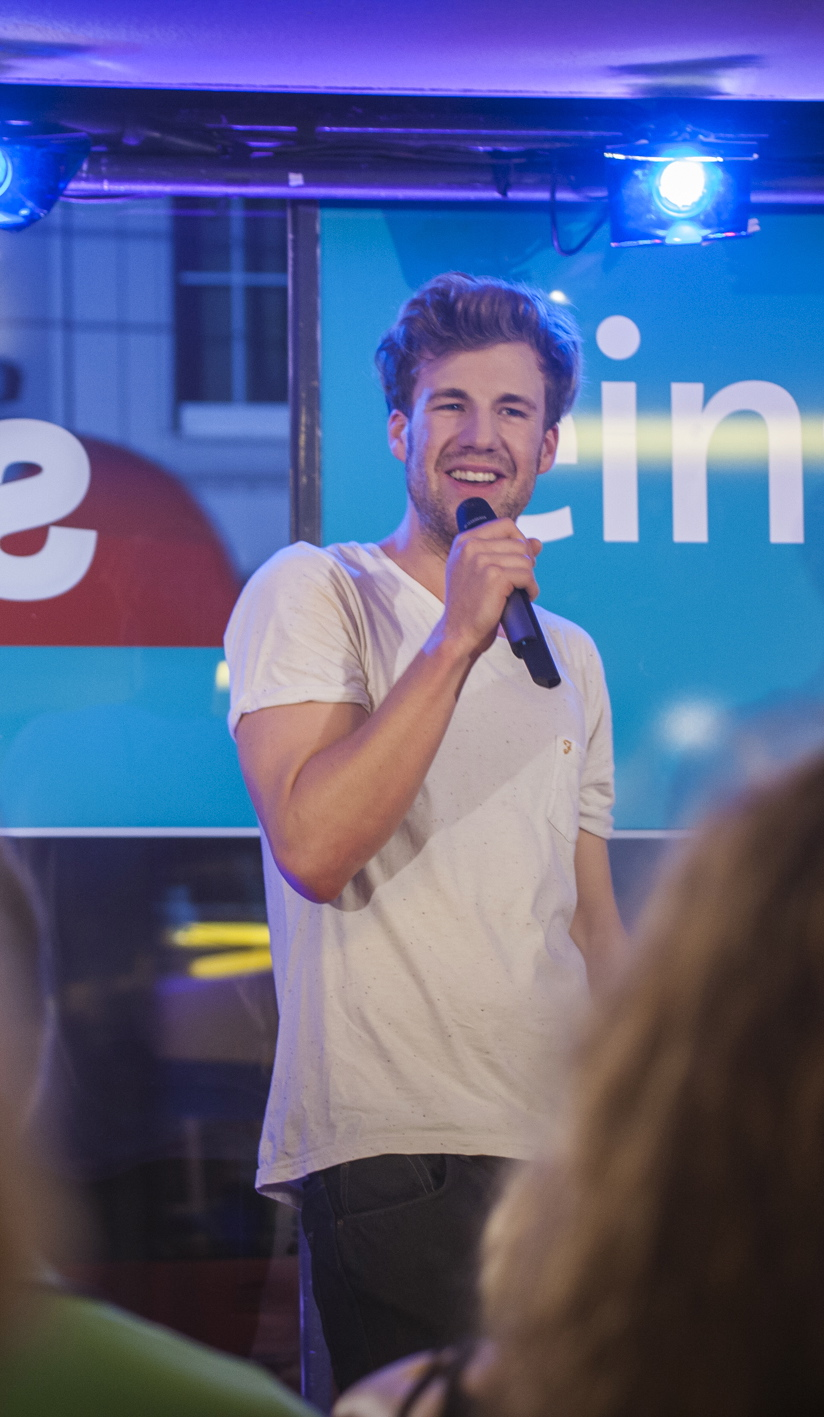
Mockridge at NightWash Comedy in Cologne

Upon completing his school finals ("Abitur"), Mockridge undertook a university programme in media and communications science in Canada, England and Germany, from which he obtained a bachelor's degree in 2012. During his studies in Canada, Mockridge made an appearance in the High School Musical Stage Programme as Chad.

Since 2012, Mockridge has been touring through Germany with the solo show I'm Lucky, I'm Luke!. In German national television, he has made regular appearances at NightWash, Quatsch Comedy Club, TV total, RTL Comedy Grand Prix, and Fun(k)haus. Mockridge is the host of 1LIVE Hörsaal-Comedy and works as writer of Switch reloaded. In September 2013, he launched his own comedy show on KiKa and ZDF called Occupy School.

Mockridge took over the role as presenter of the TV show NightWash for WDR Fernsehen on 26 September 2013. Prior to this time, he had been employed by NightWash as intern and author. Moreover, Mockridge moderated before an audience of 7,000 people on 14 October 2013 the 1LIVE Comedynacht XXL in the sold-out Lanxess Arena in Cologne. During 2013, he also appeared for a period of time non-regularly at the YouTube channel Ponk.

In 2014, Mockridge launched the YouTube channel Snoozzze, together with German YouTubers Julian "Julez" Weißbach and Joyce Ilg. In January 2014, he travelled to New York City with Stefan Raab and his show TV total on ProSieben and shot continuously for six days live for the Super Bowl XLVIII.

In 2016, it was announced that Mockridge would be a host on the Netflix reality show Ultimate Beastmaster.

Following accusations of sexualized violence, Mockridge said that he would retire in September 2021 for an indefinite period of time. Although he resigned in December of that year, in an Instagram video inspired by the movie Love Actually he announced that his "Welcome to Luckyland" tour would continue the following year.

== Awards ==
In 2013, Mockridge was awarded the sardonic title Pascha des Monats (Pasha of the Month) by EMMA magazine for so-called Herrenwitze (sexist jokes) he made during a stand-up performance. His alleged comments about an ex-girlfriend were stated as the reason for the prize. However, organizers of the programme in which the incident occurred claimed that his jokes were taken out of context. In 2013, Mockridge was awarded the German Comedy Award as Best Newcomer.
