= Kalkofes Mattscheibe =

German TV show

- Also known as: Kalkofes Mattscheibe Rekalked
- Genre: Satire
- Created by: Oliver Kalkofe
- Starring: Oliver Kalkofe
- Composer: Karl Johannes Schindler
- Country of origin: Germany
- Original language: German
- No. of seasons: 10+
- No. of episodes: 306+

Production
- Running time: 5 – 43 minutes
- Production company: Rat Pack Filmproduktion

Original release
- Network: Premiere (1994–1998); ProSieben (2003–2008); Tele 5 (2012–2021)
- Release: April 17, 1994

Kalkofes Mattscheibe is a German satirical television show starring Oliver Kalkofe.

The show's title is a pun based upon the fact that the German word Mattscheibe can mean "television screen" as well as a "mental blackout". In it, Kalkofe shows clips from German TV and humorously comments on them or parodies them. In 1996 he was awarded the Adolf-Grimme-Preis for the show. After changing channels several times over the years, the show's current incarnation (entitled Kalkofes Mattscheibe Rekalked) is broadcast on Tele 5.

Kalkofe's Media Meltdown

For Deutsche Welle, Kalkofe has also picked up some international productions that he parodies in English.
