= Der Kaiser von Schexing =

- Written by: Christian Lerch Frank Müller Anne Blume
- Directed by: Franz Xaver Bogner
- Starring: Dieter Fischer Gerd Anthoff Dorothee Hartinger
- Country of origin: Germany

Original release
- Release: February 2008 – 8 December 2011

Der Kaiser von Schexing is a German television series produced by Bayerischer Rundfunk. It takes place in the fictitious community of Markt Schexing in the district of Ebersberg.

It was filmed in Unterföhring, Rain, and Isen.

== See also ==
- List of German television series
