= Heiter bis tödlich: München 7 =

German police drama television series

- Also known as: München 7
- Created by: Franz Xaver Bogner
- Starring: Andreas Giebel, Florian Karlheim
- Country of origin: Germany
- No. of seasons: 4+
- No. of episodes: 29+

Production
- Running time: 50 minutes

Original release
- Network: Das Erste
- Release: October 24, 2004

München 7 is a German police drama series from Franz Xaver Bogner. The show is set in Munich, Germany and features the fictive police station "München 7" (which means "Munich 7"). The main characters are the "Sheriff from Marienplatz" Xaver Bartl and his new colleague Felix Kandler. Bavarian language is frequently used.

München 7 is part of a series of commonly branded shows with similar themes called Heiter bis tödlich.

== See also ==
- List of German television series
