= Heiter bis tödlich =

Heiter bis tödlich is a crime series first broadcast on 25 October 2011 by German television network Das Erste. It is made up of several different shows, which all share a common brand and theme.

The lineup of these different shows was inspired by a long-term success of the show Großstadtrevier ("Big City Precinct"). Initially ARD (parent company of Das Erste) had planned additional series to be based in other large cities, however it was later decided to also include smaller regions and the humorous side of their quirks. Prior to determining the title "Heiter bis tödlich" Das Erste used the term "Schmunzelkrimis" in press releases and the working title "Crime & Smile" due to the theme of all of these shows being the funny side of the police.

The series is broadcast Tuesdays through Thursdays at 6:50 pm.

== Line-up ==
=== Former shows ===
- 2011–2012: Heiter bis tödlich: Henker & Richter
- 2011–2012: Heiter bis tödlich: Nordisch herb
- 2012–2013: Heiter bis tödlich: Fuchs und Gans

=== Current shows ===
- Since 2011: Heiter bis tödlich: Hubert & Staller
- Since 2012: Heiter bis tödlich: Akte Ex
- Since 2012: Heiter bis tödlich: Alles Klara
- Since 2012: Heiter bis tödlich: Hauptstadtrevier
- Since 2012: Heiter bis tödlich: Morden im Norden
- Since 2012: Heiter bis tödlich: München 7
- 2013: Heiter bis tödlich: Zwischen den Zeilen
- Since 2014: Heiter bis tödlich: Koslowski & Haferkamp
- Since 2014: Heiter bis tödlich: Monaco 110
