= Bill Mockridge =

Canadian actor (born 1947)

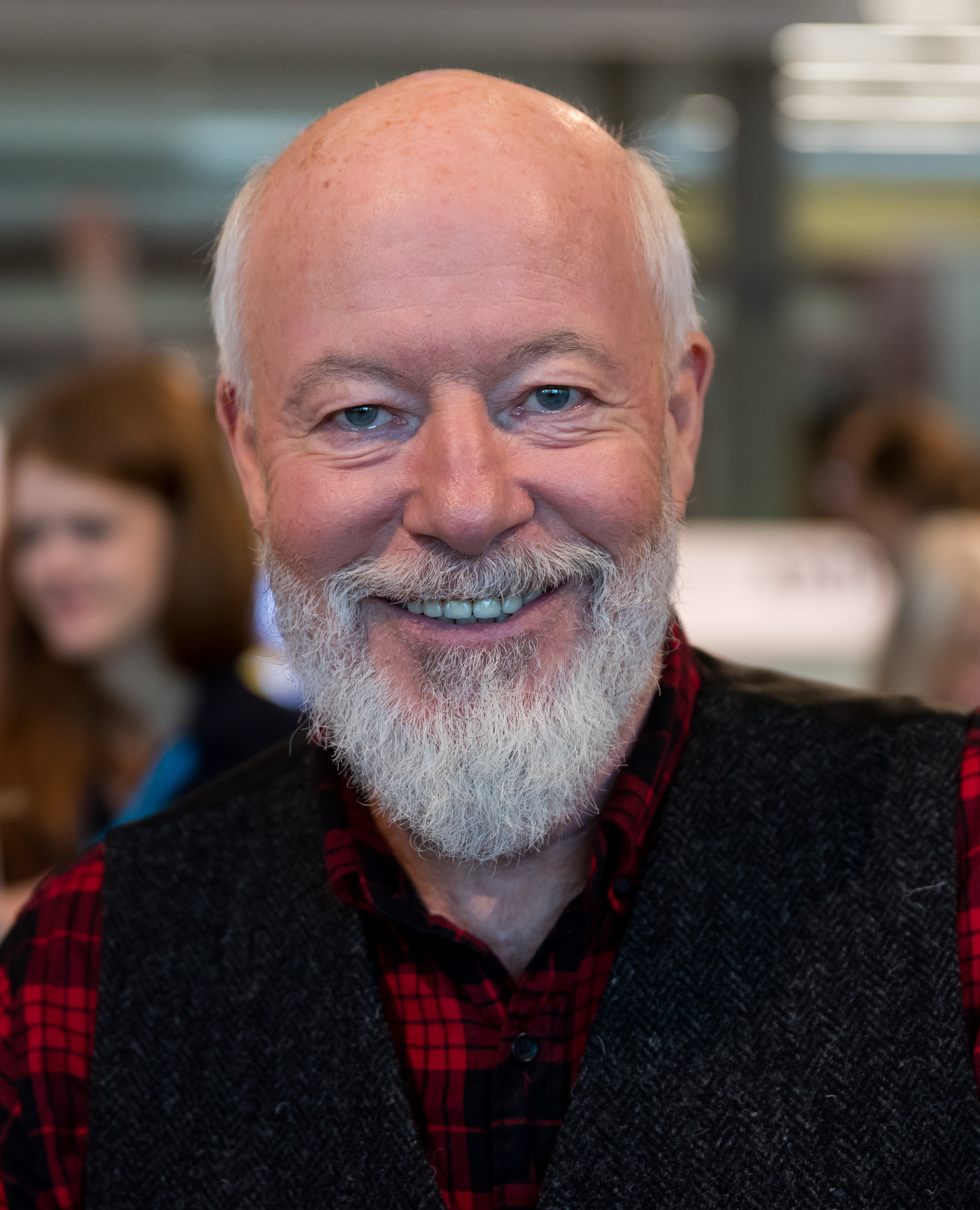
- Mockridge in 2017
- Born: 28 July 1947 (age 78); Toronto, Canada
- Occupations: Actor; Kabarett performer
- Spouse: Margie Kinsky
- Children: 6, including Luke
- Website: bill-mockridge.de

William Mockridge (born 28 July 1947) is a Canadian actor and Kabarett performer based in Germany. He is the founder of the Springmaus Theatre in Bonn. He became known to a broad public through his portrayal of Erich Schiller in the WDR television drama series Lindenstraße.

== Biography ==
After leaving school, Mockridge attended, from 1963 to 1966 and graduated from, the National Theatre School of Canada in Montreal. This was followed by his first engagements at the Manitoba Theatre Center and, from 1968 to 1969, at the Stratford Shakespeare Festival in Stratford, Ontario. During a tour of Germany in 1970, the potential of German theatre inspired him so much that he decided to work in Germany from then on. He initially worked as an assistant director at the Ulmer Theater, where he had his first engagement at a German theater between 1971 and 1973. Further commitments followed at the Stadttheater Heidelberg (1973–1978), the Basler Theater (1978–1980) and at the Schauspiel Bonn (1980–1987).

In 1982, he founded the improvisation theatre Springmaus in Bonn, where he also performs his own solo programs. He became known to a wide audience as Erich Schiller in the ARD television drama series Lindenstraße, which he played from 1991 until the end of 2015. In 2011, he had a guest appearance in the television comedy series Pastewka.

In 2012, Mockridge published his book Je oller, je doller: So vergreisen Sie richtig. In it, he deals humorously with aging. In 2015, he hosted the Golden Internet Prize for Seniors in Berlin, where pioneering online projects are being honored under the patronage of the German Federal Ministry of the Interior.

== Personal life ==
Mockridge grew up as an adopted child.

Mockridge is married to Italian-German actress Margie Kinsky and lives in the Endenich district of Bonn. The couple have six sons, all of whom are dual citizens (Italian and Canadian) and work in creative professions, including Matthew (born 1986, former musician, part of boy group Part Six), Luke (born 1989, comedian) and Jeremy Mockridge (born 1993, actor).

== Filmography (selection) ==
- 1980: St. Pauli-Landungsbrücken (television series)
- 1988: Der Fahnder (television crime drama series)
- 1991–2015: Lindenstraße (television drama series)
- 2011: Pastewka (television sitcom)
- 2015–2016: Die Mockridges – Eine Knallerfamilie (10 episodes)
- 2018–2020: Mord mit Ansage (18 episodes)
- 2021–2024: Rentnercops (television series)
