= Oliver Kalkofe =

German comedian and actor

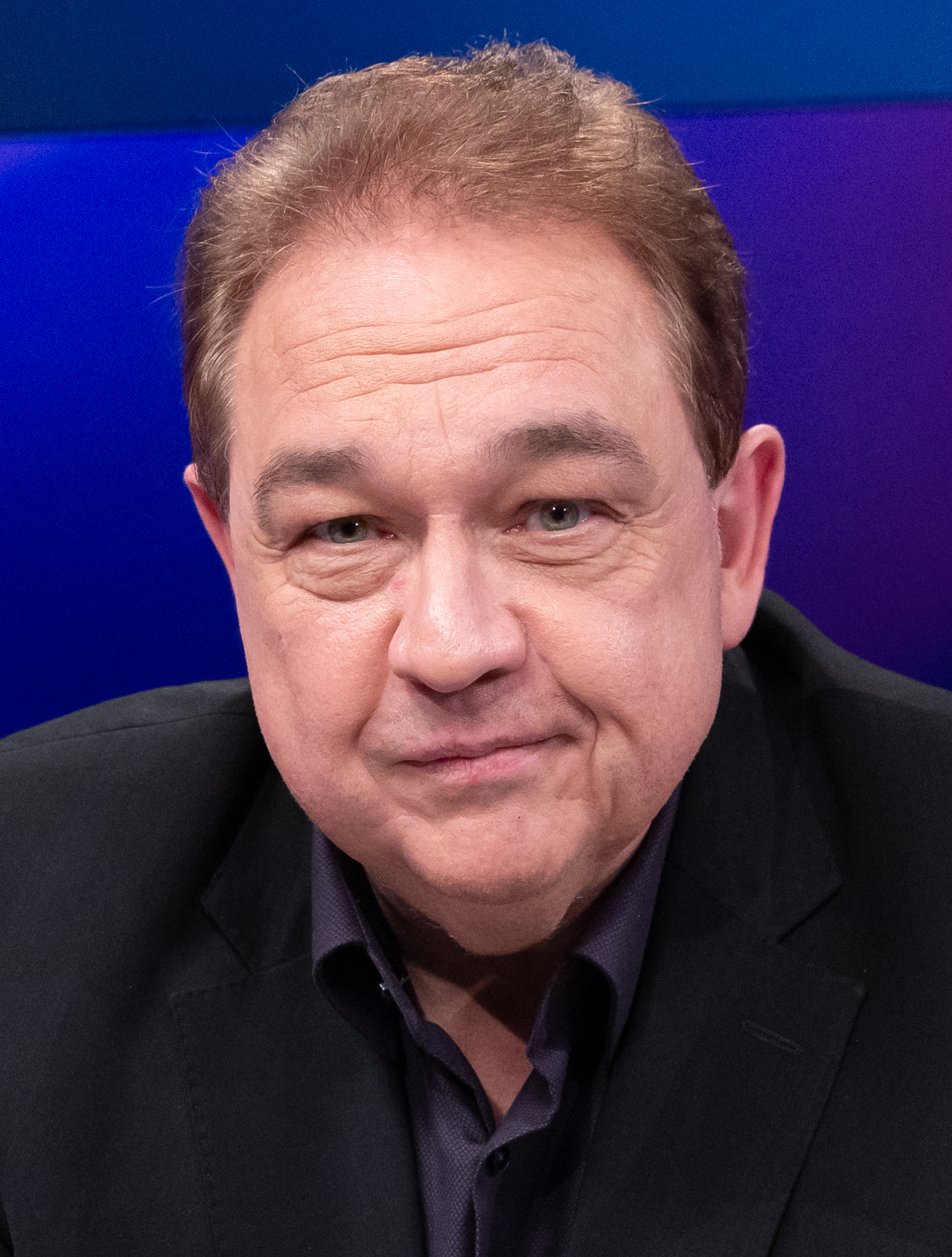
- Kalkofe in 2025
- Born: Oliver Lars Fred Kalkofe; 12 September 1965 (age 60); Engelbostel, West Germany
- Occupations: Actor; comedian; satirist; columnist; author; narrator
- Website: kalkofe.de

Oliver Lars Fred Kalkofe (born 12 September 1965) is a German actor, comedian, satirist, writer and audiobook narrator.

== Life and career ==
Kalkofe was born in Hanover and grew up in Engelbostel and Peine. After passing the Abitur in 1984, he finished his training as a foreign language correspondent clerk and interpreter in English and French before enrolling at the University of Münster to major in media and communication studies which he didn't finish, but stopped after 8 semesters.

In 1990, Kalkofe joined the Frühstyxradio, a comedy show on commercial radio station ffn. Broadcast on Sunday mornings, the shows had a theme and were presented by fictional hosts, with episodes of various ongoing series and stand-alone sketches more or less dealing with that theme. Kalkofe developed and voiced a variety of characters and series for the show.

Kalkofe gained popularity on a national level with the TV show Kalkofes Mattscheibe on German pay TV network Premiere, which he had adapted for television in 1994 from his Frühstyxradio series of the same name. The show's title is a pun based upon the fact that the German word Mattscheibe can mean "television screen" as well as a "mental blackout". In it, he shows clips from German TV and humorously comments on them or parodies them. In 1996 he was awarded the Adolf-Grimme-Preis for the show. After changing channels several times over the years, the show's current incarnation (entitled Kalkofes Mattscheibe Rekalked) is broadcast on Tele 5.

At least since the beginning of the Mattscheibe show, it is Kalkofe's trademark to use many various humorous pseudonyms and puns based upon his real last name often mispronounced or misremembered by people and the fact that it involves the syllable Kalk, which is the German word for "chalk" or "lime", and at times these puns also show conscious interplay with the German verb verkalken ("to calcify", "to fossilize", "to ossify", "being a fossil"). Examples involve Kalkofe himself and merchandizing relating to his shows referring to him as Kalkinator (in reference to the Terminator) "terminating" bad television (many of the show's different intros and merchandizing depict him violently destroying television sets), Kalk-Man (in reference to superheroes such as Superman, used for his online campaign Kalk-Man hilf! where viewers can point out examples of bad television they want him to parodize), as well as the title to the Mattscheibe show's current incarnation calling it "Rekalked" (in reference to the current movie trend of calling director's cuts, remakes, reboots, and sequels re-something, such as Apocalypse Now Redux, or calling remixes or re-releases of pre-existing material revisited, such as the best-of album Peter Gabriel Revisited).

Kalkofe's biggest commercial success are the movies Der WiXXer (2004) and Neues vom Wixxer (2007), a parody of the German Edgar Wallace screen adaptations from the 1960s. The movies were based on a Frühstyxradio sketch series and the scripts written together with comedian Bastian Pastewka as Chief Inspector Even Longer. For years, Kalkofe has announced being in pre-production on a third installment to be entitled Triple WIXX (the title being an obvious nod to the 2002 film XXX, pronounced as "Triple X"), but so far, this project has never come out of the development stages, and especially the death of co-star Joachim Fuchsberger in 2014 has cast doubts upon its eventual materialization.

Kalkofe wrote the German translation for Mystery Science Theater 3000: The Movie (1996) and dubbed the voice of Tom Servo. As Kalkofe's fellow comedian Oliver Welke provided the German voice of Crow T. Robot, the German direct-to-video cover said the film was "Presented by Kalk & Welk", with the last names of the two humorously shortened to sound alike.

In 2013, Kalkofe and fellow comedian Peter Rütten created and began hosting the still-running show SchleFaZ; "Die schlechtesten Filme aller Zeiten" ("The worst movies of all time") on Tele 5, which is loosely based on the format of Mystery Science Theater 3000. In it, Kalkofe and Rütten present trash films, introduce them with various background information, after every commercial break comment on the plot so far, and in the end summarize upon it, all within a retro-styled studio decorated in reference to the current film they're commenting on. The show has become an instant surprise hit for Tele 5, being the channel's leading show in ratings (with Kalkofe's other show Kalkofes Mattscheibe Rekalked being second), and during broadcasts of the show on Friday nights, the hashtag #schlefaz regularly enters the German Twitter top ten charts, which has prompted German TV Guides and even Tele 5 themselves to adopt the Twitter hashtag as a semi-official name for the show, also used by show hosts Kalkofe and Rütten themselves. Rütten and Kalkofe made an ironic cameo appearance in the 2015 trash movie Sharknado 3: Oh Hell No!.

In January 2017, Kalkofe wrote and produced an English-language episode dealing with American and international politics, of his Kalkofes Mattscheibe show under the English title Kalkofe's Media Meltdown exclusively for and released by Deutsche Welle.

== Filmography (selection) ==
=== Actor ===
- Der WiXXer (2004, also writer-producer)
- Die ProSieben Märchenstunde: Rumpelstilzchen – Auf Wache im Märchenwald (TV; 2006)
- Neues vom Wixxer (2007, also writer-producer)
- Der Goldene Nazivampir von Absam 2 – Das Geheimnis von Schloß Kottlitz (2007)
- Urmel voll in Fahrt (2008, voice)
- Gut zu Vögeln (2016)

=== Voice actor (German dubbed version) ===
- 1998 Mystery Science Theater 3000: The Movie (de: Mystery Science Theater 3000: Der Film) as Tom Servo and Benkitnorf
- 2005 Robots as Phineas T. Ratchet
- 2006 Cars as Dusty (de: Kling)
- 2007 Little Britain as the German voice of Matt Lucas
- 2009 The Haunted World of El Superbeasto as El Superbeasto
- 2010 Tayo the Little Bus as Cooku
- 2011 Come fly with me as the German voice of Matt Lucas
- 2013 Epic as Mub
- 2013 Planes (also in English) as Franz Fliegenhosen
- 2022 Puss in Boots: The Last Wish as Big Jack Horner, the Ethical Bug

=== Video games ===
- 2004: The Bards Tale as The Bard

== Bibliography ==
- Onkel Hottes Märchenstunde (2001, illustrated by Michael Hellmich, ISBN 3-8303-3026-X)
- Der Wixxer (2007, with Bastian Pastewka and Oliver Welke, ISBN 978-3-8025-1744-0)
- Neues vom Wixxer (2007, with Bastian Pastewka and Oliver Welke, ISBN 978-3-8025-1745-7)
- Geschafft! Wir sind blöd!: Kalkofes letzte Worte (2008)

== Audiobooks (excerpt) ==
- 2014: Christiane Franke & Cornelia Kuhnert: Krabbenbrot und Seemannstod: Ein Ostfriesenkrimi, Publisher: audio media Verlag, ISBN 978-3-86804-855-1
- 2016: Agatha Christie: Das Geheimnis der Schnallenschuhe (Hercule Poirot), Publisher: Der Hörverlag, ISBN 978-3-8445-2089-7
