= Bastian Pastewka =

German actor and comedian (born 1972)

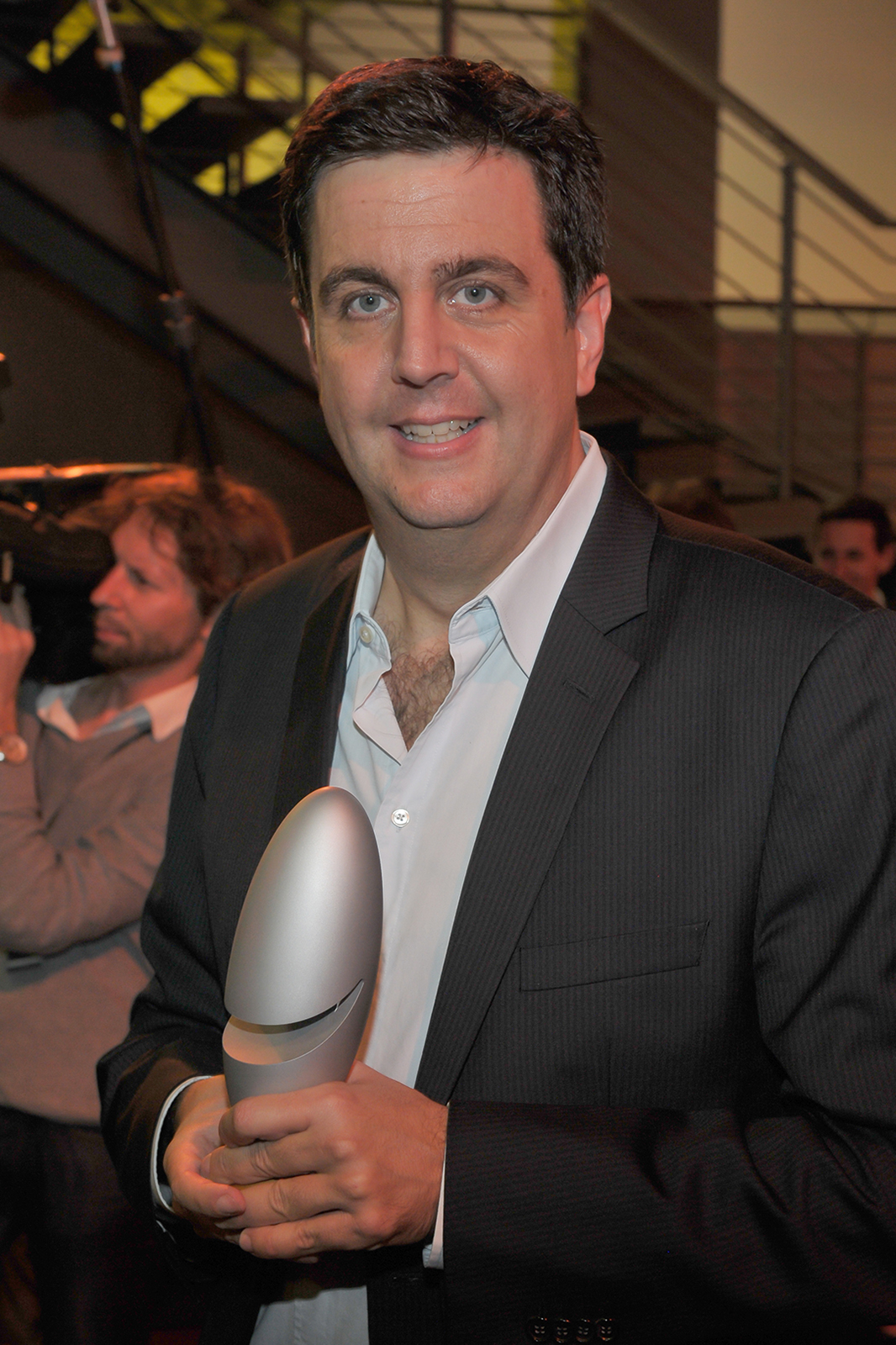
- Pastewka at the Deutscher Comedypreis in 2013
- Born: Bastian Pastewka; 4 April 1972 (age 54); Bochum, West Germany
- Occupations: Comedian, actor, dubbing
- Partner: Heidrun Buchmaier
- Website: bastianpastewka.de

Bastian Pastewka (born 4 April 1972) is a German actor and comedian.

In Bochum, he first became known to a wider audience in Germany around 1996 as a regular cast member of the comedy show Die Wochenshow (engl.: The Weekly Show), essentially a mock news program. His trademarks included quirky, off-beat characters such as queer sex talk show host Brisko Schneider and Ottmar Zittlau, an unemployed, sweatsuit-wearing dimwit.

Pastewka went on to star in various German comedy films, most notably Der Wixxer (2004) and Neues vom Wixxer (2007), a spoof on 1960s Edgar Wallace crime dramas. He has also worked as a voice-over actor for numerous animated films, such as Madagascar. Since September 2005 Pastewka has been playing himself in the sitcom Pastewka, shown by the German television broadcasting station Sat.1.

Pastewka was the runner-up in season 2 of LOL Deutschland on Amazon Prime.

He has received various highly prestigious awards like Goldene Kamera, Deutscher Fernsehpreis (engl.: German Television Award) or Rose d'Or.

== Personal life ==
Pastewka lives with his girlfriend Heidrun Buchmaier, manager of Martin Schneider, in Berlin-Charlottenburg. When he is working, he lives in Cologne.
