= Jacky Dreksler =

German television producer

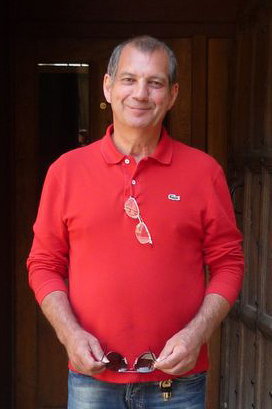
- Dreksler in 2013
- Born: Jacob Joseph Dreksler; 1 March 1946 (age 80); Paris, France
- Occupations: Author, television producer, songwriter, journalist, consultant, publisher
- Years active: 1972–present
- Spouse: Babs Ahland-Dreksler

Jacob Joseph "Jacky" Dreksler (born 1 March 1946) is a German television producer, writer, songwriter and publisher. Dreksler has created many popular and successful German television shows including Schreinemakers Live and RTL Samstag Nacht. He co-owns his TV production and publishing company Pacific Productions with his wife Dr. Babs Ahland-Dreksler.

== Early life ==
Dreksler was born in Paris, France to a single Jewish mother. After she died in 1955, when he was nine, he grew up as an orphan in Germany and, for a short while, in the USA where he attended a public school in Kenmore, New York, near Buffalo. He began his career at the chemical and health care corporation Bayer as a young unskilled worker, and then did an apprenticeship as a chemistry lab assistant while at the same time going to night school to complete his high school diploma. Starting in 1968, he studied education, philosophy and sociology in Cologne and completed a master's degree in education. With his wife Babs, he founded the production and publishing company Pacific Productions in 1988.

== Career ==
=== Teacher ===
From 1972, Dreksler taught education theory, history and sociology at a German high school. He taught sociology as a university lecturer at the University of Bonn, Germany and philosophy at various institutions. At thirty, he left the teaching track to accept a doctoral fellowship and worked part-time as a journalist, comic writer, and sailing instructor.

=== Music ===
In 1975 Dreksler founded a music school, which he directed for five years. He has also written various textbooks on pop and classical guitar and piano/keyboard and an electronics encyclopedia. He has written arrangements for folk, pop and jazz songs and he published songbooks and books on guitar and keyboards. As of 1983 Dreksler also wrote the music or lyrics for songs performed by artists including Charles Aznavour, Heino, Tony Marshall, Roland Kaiser, Mike Krüger, Die Flippers, Costa Cordalis, and Milva. He composed and produced radio jingles. For a short while, he unsuccessfully pursued a singing career for producer Jack White.

=== Radio ===
In 1982, Dreksler began working almost exclusively for radio as actor, author, host, and producer of various radio formats. Dreksler wrote, spoke, played and produced some 1500 sketches, gag songs and features for various radio stations.

=== Author ===
Beginning in 1984, Dreksler became show author and hosting coach for German show celebrities like Dieter Thomas Heck, Hugo Egon Balder, Hella von Sinnen, Frank Elstner, Max Schautzer, Dagmar Berghoff, Michael Schanze, Carlo von Tiedemann, and Carolin Reiber (around 650 TV shows, with a total of over 70 different titles).

=== TV producer ===
In 1991, Dreksler switched to the TV producers' camp and produced the German version of an American and British panel game show (Match Game, Blankety Blank. He produced music videos, created and produced some 400 comedy shows, late night shows, variety shows, and game shows, including Schreinemakers Live for SAT.1 and, in collaboration with Hugo Egon Balder, over 150 episodes of RTL Samstag Nacht, the German version of Saturday Night Live. In conjunction with the Canadian company of Gilbert Rozon, he co-produced the German version of Just Kidding and Just For Laughs for RTL Television.

=== Publisher ===
In 2007, Dreksler started the publishing branch of his company Pacific Productions with a book he co-wrote with Hugo Egon Balder Wunsch-Bullshit im Universum, a critique of self-help books based on the Law of Attraction like Rhonda Byrne’s The Secret or Esther Hicks’s Ask and it is Given, (co-written with her husband Jerry Hicks).

== Personal life ==
Dreksler is married to Dr. Babs Ahland-Dreksler (born 1958). They have two children, Noemi (born 1990) and Noelani (born 1994). Dreksler and his wife live and work in Cologne, Germany.

== Selected list of works ==
Books

- Jacky Dreksler, Quirin Härle: 1000 Keyboard Tips. Tutorial, Songbook, Dictionary, Reference Book, Exercises, Pro-Tricks, Bonn 1987.
- Jacob Dreksler: Pädagogik – Fachwissenschaft, Fachdidaktik und Unterrichtsfach. In: Raimund H. Drommel (Hrsg.): Beiträge zur Didaktik und Erziehungswissenschaft. Band 2, Paderborn 1980.
- Jacky Dreksler, Mike Eulner: Tausend Tips für die Gitarre . Bonn 1981.
- Jacky Dreksler, Mike Eulner: Hits & Songs with illustrations by André Roche. Köln 1982
- Barbara Ahland, Jacky Dreksler, Quirin Härle: Electronic Music ABC. Erftstadt 1986.
- Jacky Dreksler, Hugo Egon Balder (Hrsg.): RTL Samstag Nacht. Oldenburg 1995.
- Jacky Dreksler, Hugo Egon Balder: „Wunsch-Bullshit im Universum. Eine Kritik der Wunsch-Bestellungen im Universum von Rhonda Byrne, Pierre Franckh, Bärbel Mohr, Esther Hicks und Kurt Tepperwein – auf dem schmalen Grat zwischen Nicht-mehr-Satire und Noch-nicht-Wissenschaft. Köln 2007.

TV producer

- Punkt-Punkt-Punkt (German version of „Match Game"). NDR/SAT.1 Gameshow, host Mike Krüger, 1991–1993.
- Schreinemakers Live. SAT.1 Infotainment Show, host Margarethe Schreinemakers, starting 1992.
- RTL Samstag Nacht. RTL 1993–1998.
- 30 Jahre Heino. RTL Show 1995.
- Bayerischer Fernsehpreis. ARD award show, 1995.
- RTL Nachtshow. RTL Late Night Show with host Thomas Koschwitz, 1995.
- Just for Laughs. RTL, host Mirco Nontschew, 1995/96.
- Just Kidding. RTL, host Mirco Nontschew, 1996.
- Happiness. RTL Sketch show featuring Dorkas Kiefer and Markus Maria Profitlich.
- Alles Klar. Nickelodeon, sketch comedy show for kids, 1997.
- Karls Kneipe. RTL, talk show with Karl Dall, 1997.
- Köln Comedy Festival. RTL 1996–1999
- RTL Comedy Nacht. 2005.
- Die Hella von Sinnen Show. SAT.1, 2006.
- Peng! Die Westernshow, in collaboration with Robert Ivie, SAT.1, 2008.
- Holldriöh! Die Alpenshow, in collaboration with Robert Ivie, SAT.1, 2008.
- Schlotter! Die Gruselshow, in collaboration with Robert Ivie, SAT.1, 2009.
- Aloha! Die Südseeshow. in collaboration with Robert Ivie, SAT.1, 2009.

Executive producer

- Frei Schnauze. RTL Impro-Show with Mike Krüger, 2004.
- Taratata. SAT.1, live music show, co-executive Producer Hugo Egon Balder, 2005.

Screen writer

- Alles nichts oder. RTL, host Hugo Egon Balder and Hella von Sinnen.
- ARD Wunschkonzert. ARD, with Dagmar Berghoff and Max Schautzer.
- Bananas. Musik und Sketche, ARD.
- Die Michael Schanze Show. ARD.
- Die Mike Krüger Show. SAT.1.
- Die Volkstümliche Hitparade. ZDF, host Carolin Reiber.
- Hallo Heino. SAT.1, host Heino.
- Happiness. RTL, with Comedians Markus Maria Profitlich, Dorkas Kiefer, et al.
- Ihr Einsatz bitte. ZDF, host Dieter Thomas Heck.
- Show & Co mit Carlo. ZDF, host Carlo von Tiedemann.
- Showfenster. ZDF, host Sabine Sauer.
- Vier gegen Willy. ARD, host Mike Krüger.

Lyricist

- 1983 Joachim Cadenbach: "Mein Dallas".
- 1985 Costa Cordalis: Am Strand von Griechenland.
- 1985 Hugo Egon Balder: Toot Toot.
- 1986 Hugo Egon Balder: Nimm’s easy, sei happy (cover version of „Don’t Worry, Be Happy).
- 1989 Die Flippers: Ich halt Dich.
- 1989 Die Flippers: Nachts am Wolgastrand.
- 1990 Roland Kaiser: Un amore grande.
- 1990 Roland Kaiser: Wind auf der Haut und Lisa.
- 1990 Xanadu: Keine Stunde hab ich je bereut.
- 1991 Die Flippers: Moonlight Lady.
- 1991 Roland Kaiser: Lebenslänglich Du.
- 1991 Roland Kaiser: Sag niemals nie.
- 1992 Die Flippers: Liebe ist eine Rose.
- 1992 Heino: Glocken am Rhein.
- 1992 Roland Kaiser: Südlich von mir.
- 1993 Heino: Aloha Oe.
- 1993 Heino: Olé o Cangaceiro.
- 1993 Heino: So wie am ersten Tag.
- 1993 Roland Kaiser: Ganz oder gar nicht.
- 1993 Roland Kaiser: Was wäre wenn.
- 1995 Charles Aznavour: Die Erinnerung an Dich.
- 1995 Charles Aznavour: Die Gedanken.
- 1995 Charles Aznavour: Die schöne Zeit.
- 1995 Charles Aznavour: Du gegen mich.
- 1995 Charles Aznavour: Ich klammre mich an Dich.
- 1995 Charles Aznavour: Sag ich Dir nun Adieu.
- 1995 Charles Aznavour: Schlafen Sie mit mir.
- 1995 Charles Aznavour: So liebe ich Dich.
- 1995 Charles Aznavour: Umarme mich.
- 1995 Charles Aznavour: Wenn Du neben mir schläfst.
- 1999 Heino: Alte Kameraden.
- 1999 Heino: Auf in den Kampf Torero.
- 2011 Hugo Egon Balder: Internet Junkie.
- 2011 Hugo Egon Balder: Die letzte Fahrt ist immer in 'nem Kombi.
- 2011 Hugo Egon Balder: Sonst nix. Der legendäre Wixerblues.
- 2011 Hugo Egon Balder: Deutschland sucht.
- 2011 Hugo Egon Balder: Hottest Girl in Town.
- 2011 Hugo Egon Balder: Kühl.

Composer

- 1983 Joachim Cadenbach: Mein Dallas.
- 1984 Adjah Lion (pseudonym): Oh Grenada.
- 1984 Adjah Lion (pseudonym): Love on Crystal Sand.
- 1985 Milkshake: Shoobie-Doo-A.
- 1985 Milkshake: Shoobie-Doo-B.
- 2011 Hugo Egon Balder: Der frühe Vogel fängt den Wurm (M: Hugo Egon Balder, Jacky Dreksler, Uli Salm).
- 2011 Hugo Egon Balder: Internet Junkie. (M: Hugo Egon Balder, Jacky Dreksler, Uli Salm).
- 2011 Hugo Egon Balder: Die letzte Fahrt ist immer in 'nem Kombi. (M: Hugo Egon Balder, Jacky Dreksler).
- 2011 Hugo Egon Balder: Deutschland sucht. (M: Hugo Egon Balder, Jacky Dreksler, Uli Salm).
- 2011 Hugo Egon Balder: Hottest Girl in Town. (M: Hugo Egon Balder, Jacky Dreksler).
- 2011 Hugo Egon Balder: Kühl. (M: Hugo Egon Balder, Jacky Dreksler).

Discography

- 1984 Adjah Lion (Pseudonym): Oh Grenada.
- 1984 Adjah Lion (Pseudonym): Love on Crystal Sand.
- 1985 Milkshake: Shoobie-Doo-A.
- 1985 Milkshake: Shoobie-Doo-B.

Publisher

- Jacky Dreksler, Hugo Egon Balder: Wunsch-Bullshit im Universum. Eine Kritik der Wunsch-Bestellungen im Universum von Rhonda Byrne, Pierre Franckh, Bärbel Mohr, Esther Hicks und Kurt Tepperwein – auf dem schmalen Grat zwischen Nicht-mehr-Satire und Noch-nicht-Wissenschaft. Köln 2007. ISBN 978-3-9812015-8-1.
- Nalani Kamea: ABFFL. Allerbeste Freundinnen fürs Leben. Köln 2013. ISBN 978-3-9812015-5-0.
- Jacky Dreksler, Hugo Egon Balder: Witze zur Wahl 2013. Köln 2013. ISBN 978-3-9812015-0-5.
