= Die Doofen =

German comedy music group

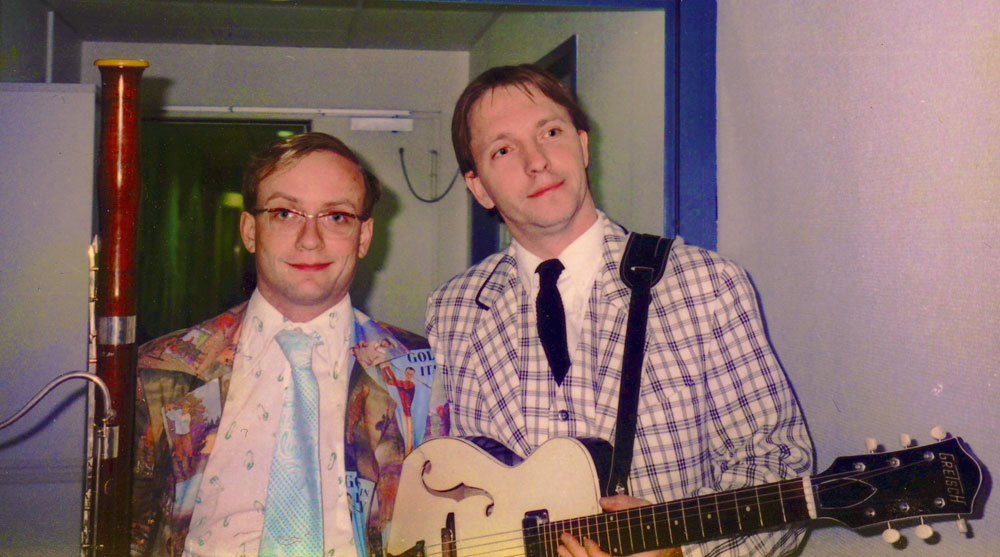
- Boning (left) and Dittrich in 1996

Background information
- Also known as: Wigald Boning & Die Doofen
- Origin: Hamburg, Germany
- Genres: Comedy music, Comedy rock
- Years active: 1992, 1995–1998
- Members: Wigald Boning; Olli Dittrich

Die Doofen ("The Stupids") was a German comedy musical duo consisting of comedians Wigald Boning and Olli Dittrich.

== History ==
The band was formed in 1992 under the name Wigald Boning & Die Doofen, but split up after their debut album. Boning and Dittrich joined German television show RTL Samstag Nacht ("RTL Saturday Night") in 1993 in which they worked as comedians until 1998. They also reunited as a band (under the name Die Doofen) on this show. They are best known for their two albums in this period. Their number one album Lieder, die die Welt nicht braucht ("Songs that no one needs") sold more than 1 million copies in Germany. Their single "Mief" ("Stink") was also a number one hit in their native country. They won the German music awards Echo, Bambi, Goldene Stimmgabel and Goldene Europa. Boning and Dittrich split up again in 1998 in the last episode of RTL Samstag Nacht with a parody of the song "Time to Say Goodbye".

Fans started a petition called "Wir wollen die Doofen" ("We want The Stupids") in 2010 aiming to reunite the band.

== Discography ==
Wigald Boning & Die Doofen

- 1992: Langspielplatte (album)
- 1992: "Fiep, Fiep, Fiep" (single)
- 1992: "Ich bin ganz aus Lakritz gemacht" (single)

Die Doofen

- 1995: Lieder, die die Welt nicht braucht (album)
- 1995: "Mief" (single)
- 1995: "Jesus" (single)
- 1996: Melodien für Melonen (album)
- 1996: "Prinzessin de Bahia Tropical" (single)
- 1996: "Zicke Zack Tsatsiki" (single)
- 1996: "Lach doch mal" (single)

== Awards ==
- 1995: Goldene Stimmgabel
- 1995: Bambi
- 1995: Echo
- 1995: Goldene Europa
