= Barbara Eligmann =

German television presenter

Barbara Eligmann (born 6 November 1963 in Ludwigshafen) is a German television presenter.

== Life ==
Eligmann works for German broadcaster RTL Television. She is married and has three children.

== Filmography ==
- Explosiv – Das Magazin
- clever! – Die Show, die Wissen schafft (together with Wigald Boning)
