= Jarnach =

Jarnach is a surname. Notable people with the surname include:

- Franz Jarnach (1943–2017), German actor and musician
- Philipp Jarnach (1892–1982), French-born German composer, and father of Franz Jarnach
