= Hugo Egon Balder =

German television presenter

Hugo Balder
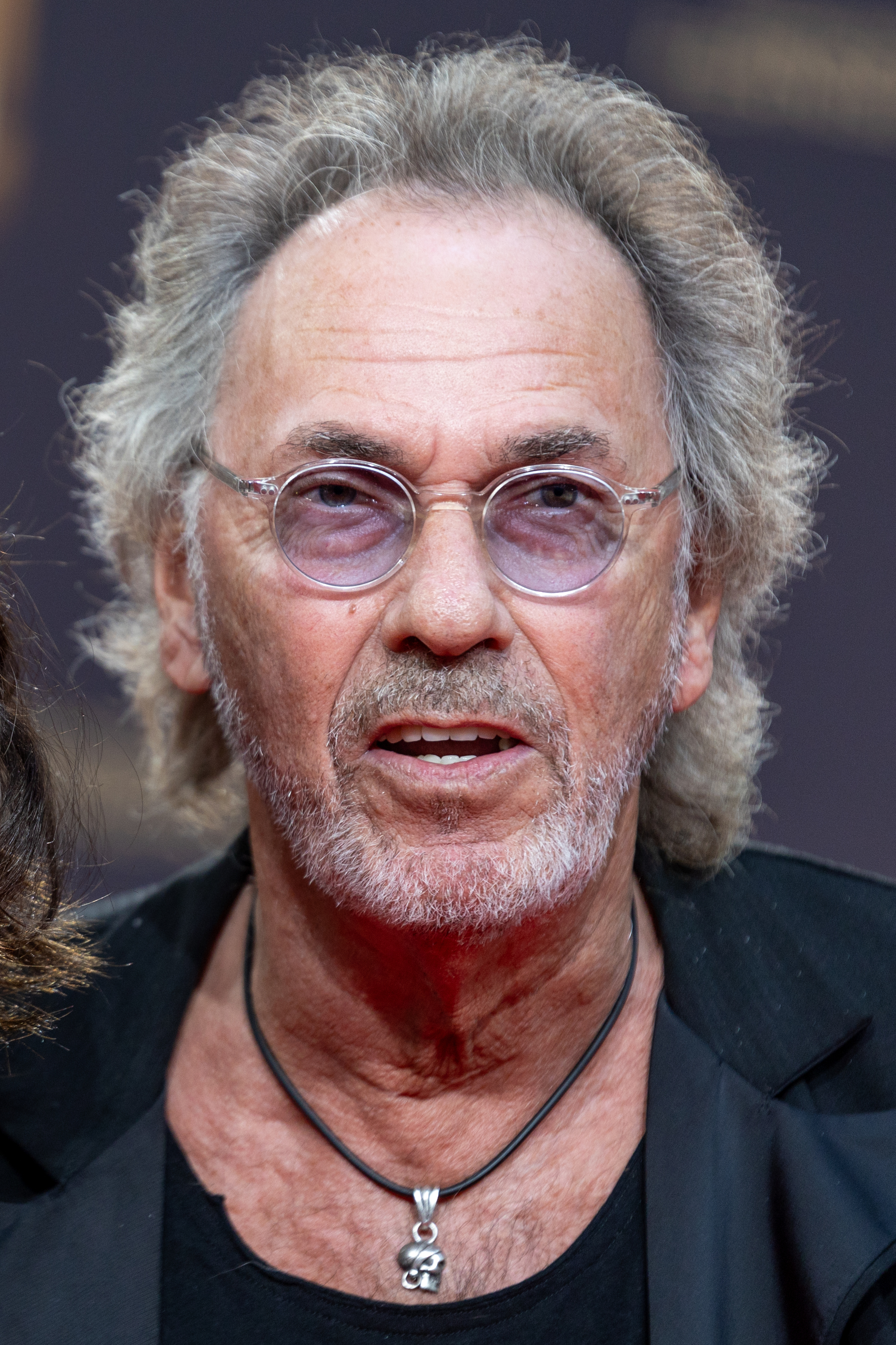
- Balder in 2023
- Born: Egon Hugo Balder; 22 March 1950 (age 76); West Berlin, West Germany
- Occupations: Television presenter, producer, comedian
- Children: 2

Hugo Egon Balder (born Egon Hugo Balder; 22 March 1950) is a German television presenter, producer, and comedian.

== Early life ==
Balder was born in West Berlin to Egon Friedrich Balder (1904–1970) and Gerda Balder (née Schure; 1910–1997). Gerda Balder was Jewish who, together with her mother and her son from her first marriage, survived the Theresienstadt concentration camp.

Balder was a founding member of the Krautrock band Birth Control in 1968.

== Career ==
Balder received acting training at a private acting school in Berlin from 1973 to 1976. Following that, he temporarily joined the ensemble of the Berliner Schillertheater. In 1985, he switched to the ensemble of the Düsseldorf cabaret Kom(m)ödchen, where he collaborated with Lore Lorentz and Harald Schmidt. Secondarily, he performed as a pop singer and had a notable success with his single "Erna kommt" (1985).

=== Television ===
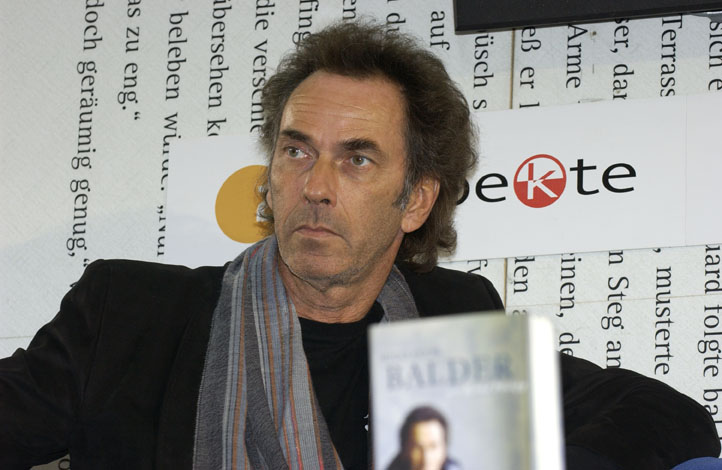
Balder in 2004

Balder's first roles as a show host were in various radio shows at Radio Luxembourg, until 1984, when he began to appear regularly on television (RTL). His popularity is mainly based on the shows Alles nichts oder?! and Tutti frutti which he hosted from 1988 until 1992 on RTL. As a producer, Balder was involved in the making of April, April (hosted by Frank Elstner) and RTL Samstag Nacht.

Currently, Balder works as the producer and show host of Genial daneben and the spin-off Genial daneben – Das Quiz on Sat.1.

== Personal life ==
Balder is divorced (for the fourth time) and has two children.
