= Stefan Jürgens =

German musician and actor

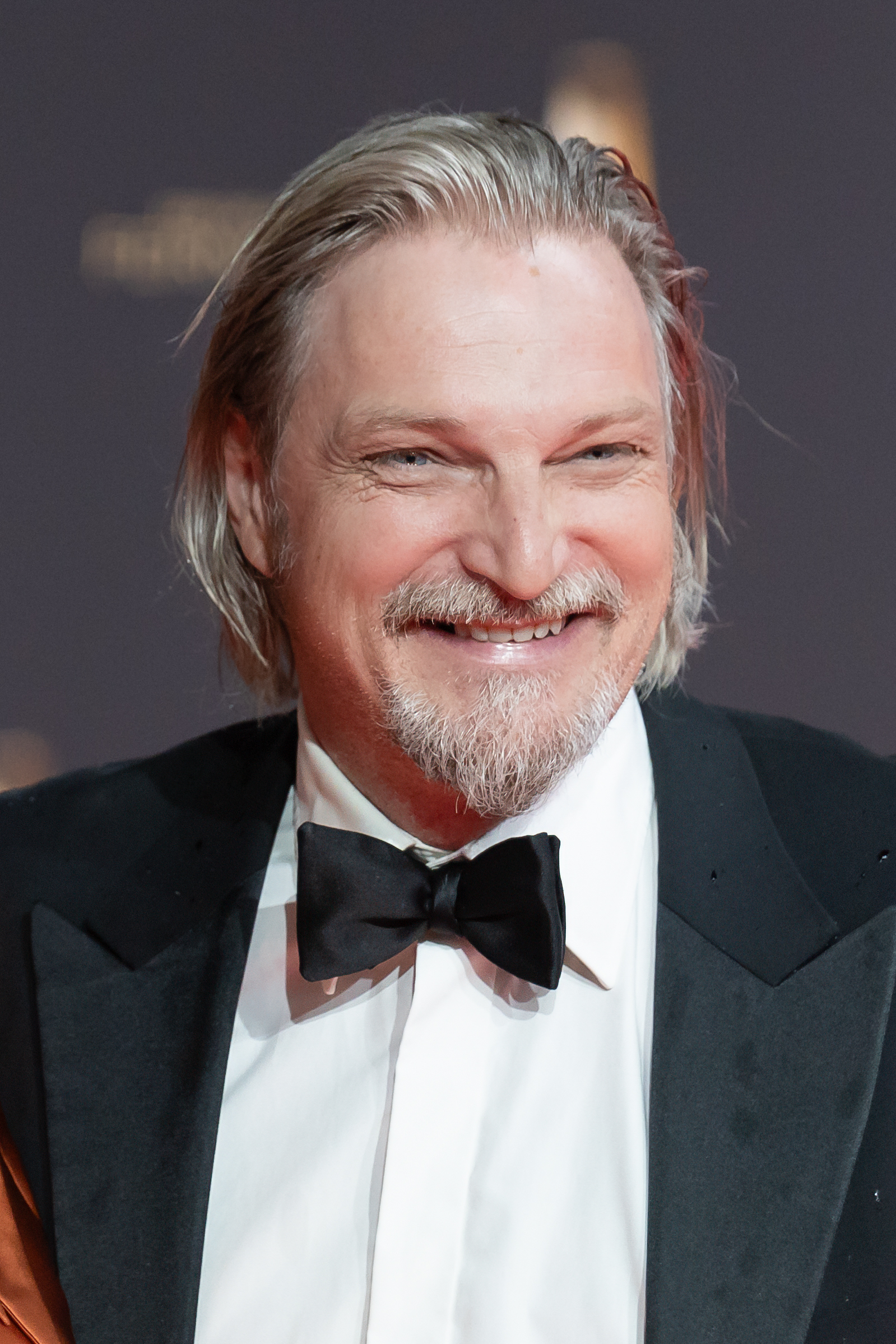
- Jürgens in 2024
- Born: 26 February 1963; Unna, West Germany
- Occupations: Actor; musician

Stefan Jürgens (born 26 February 1963) is a German actor and musician.

== Career ==
Jürgens was born in Unna on 26 February 1963. In 1983, he began training at the Westfälische Schauspielschule in Bochum. After three and a half years he completed his acting training. He lives in Berlin and Vienna and has four children.

Afterwards he was hired by the Schauspielhaus Bochum, the Theater Dortmund and the Theater des Westens in Berlin as well as other theaters.

He also appeared in German TV and film productions. He was a member of the TV comedy series RTL Samstag Nacht (1993–1998). He appeared as Robert Hellmann in Tatort and as Carl Ribarski in the OFR/ZDF series SOKO Donau (in Germany SOKO Wien) until his departure in 2020.

He made an appearance as Albrecht von Wallenstein in the documentary Die Deutschen.

In 2002, Jürgens released his first solo album called Langstreckenlauf. Since then he released six more albums: Heldenzeiten, Alles aus Liebe, Alles immer möglich, Grenzenlos Mensch, Was zählt and So viele Farben.

Jürgens lives in Berlin.
