= The Rattles =

German rock band

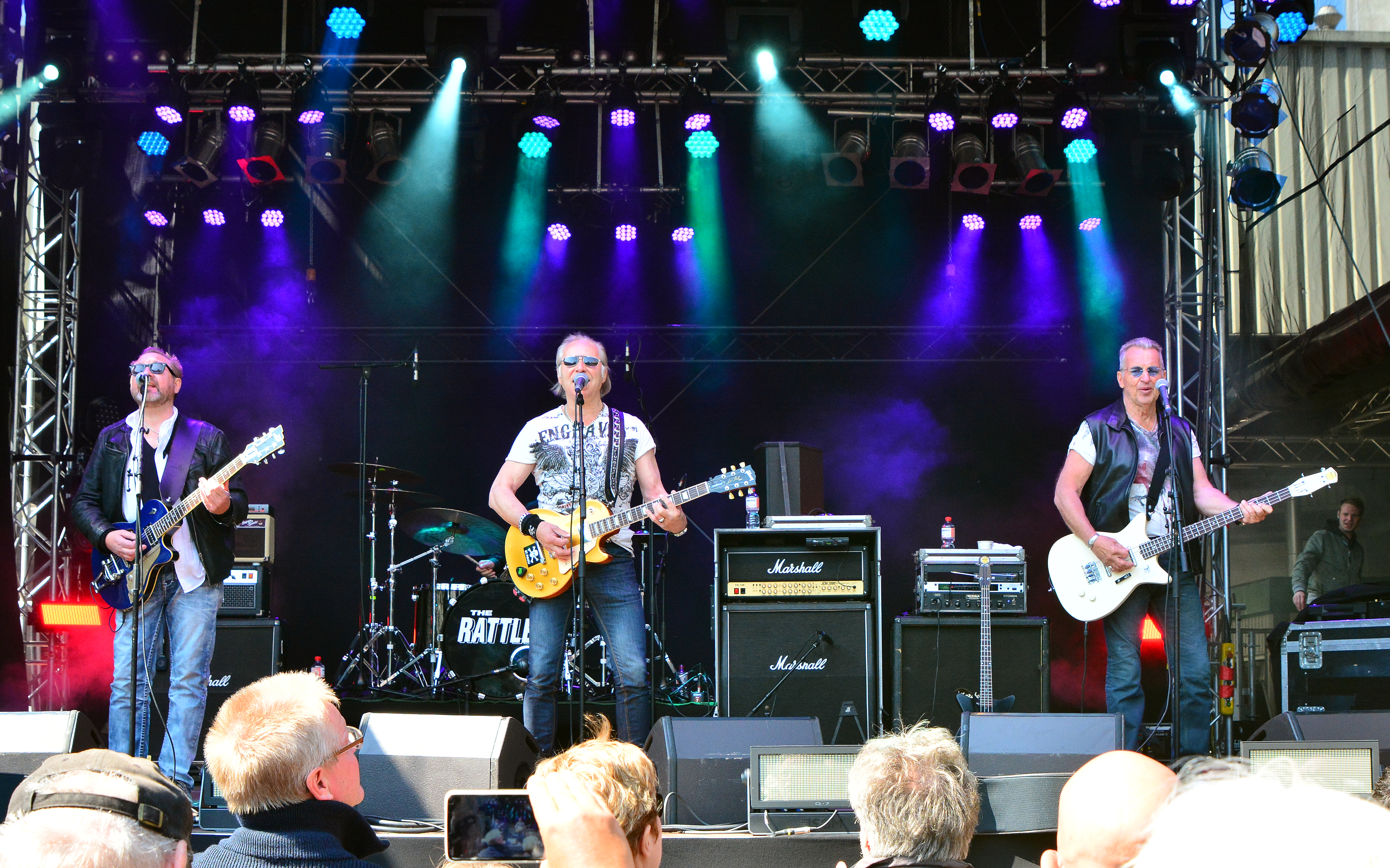
- The Rattles performing at the Holsten Brauereifest in Hamburg in 2015

Background information
- Also known as: The "In" Crowd
- Origin: Hamburg, Germany
- Genres: Rock; beat; psychedelic rock
- Years active: 1960–present
- Labels: Philips; Repertoire; Star-Club; Edel
- Members: Herbert Hildebrandt; Dicky Tarrach; Eggert Johannsen; Manne Kraski
- Website: rattles.de

The Rattles are a German beat and rock band formed in Hamburg in 1960, best known for their 1970 psychedelic hit single "The Witch".

== Career ==
The Rattles performed in Hamburg, and played at the same venues as The Beatles on several occasions in 1962. In 1968, they recorded their first version of "The Witch", with vocals by Henner Hoier. By the time of "The Witch", the original members had all left and successively been replaced by other musicians, with Edna Bejarano now being the lead singer. The band's records sold well in Germany throughout the 1960s. They were featured in the 1966 German film 'Hurra! Die Rattles Kommen!' ('Hurray! The Rattles Are Coming!').

Their second version of "The Witch" in 1970, this time with vocals by Edna Bejarano, was their only international hit. It reached the Top 10 on the UK Singles Chart, the top 20 in Austria, and the Billboard Hot 100 in the U.S. It eventually sold over one million copies.

Rosetta Stone released a gothic rock cover of "The Witch" in the 1990s. The Norwegian psychedelic hard rock band, Motorpsycho, covered the song during 1999 and 2000. A recording of this song can be found on their bootleg Live Union Scene from 14 April 1999.

== Members ==
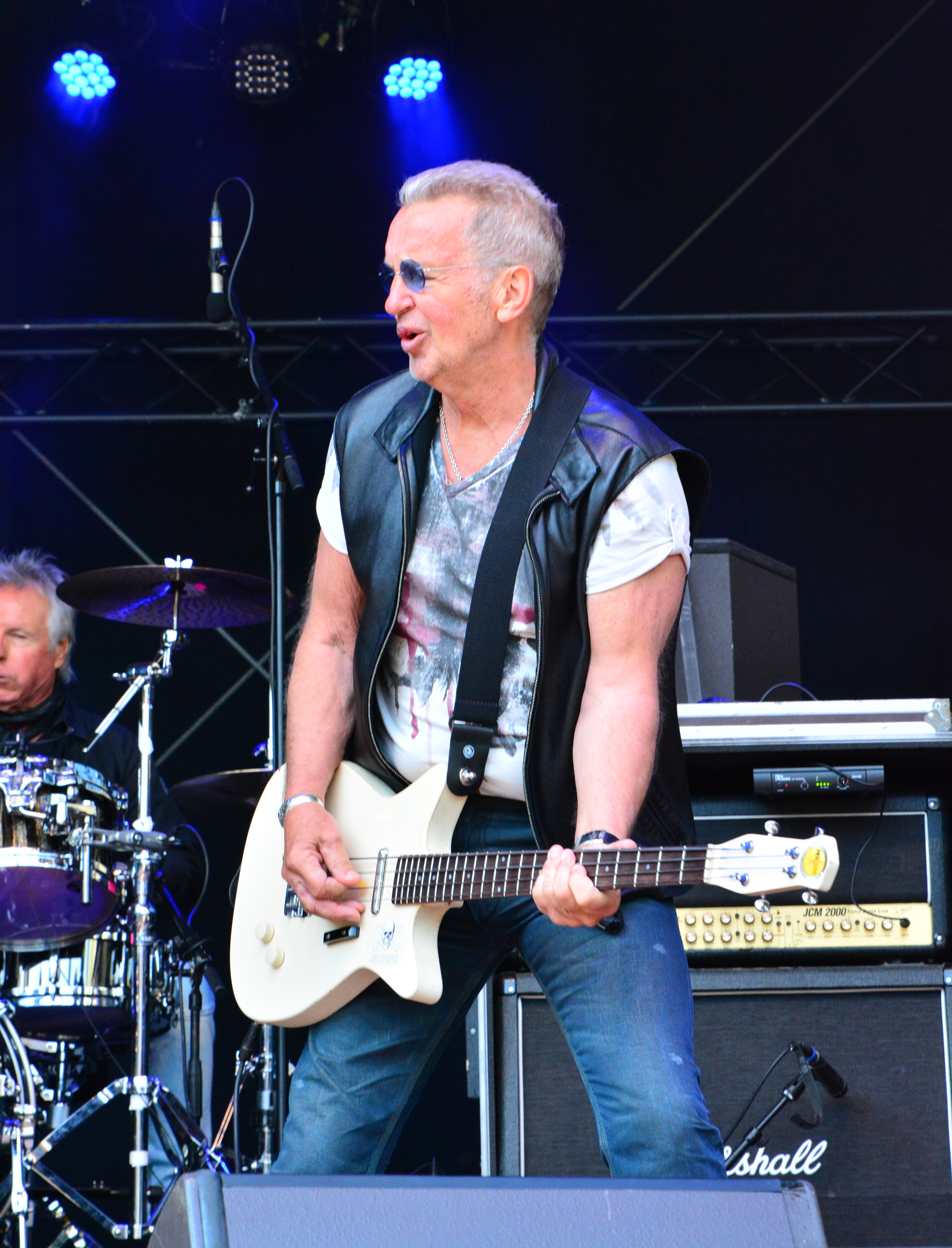
Herbert Hildebrandt

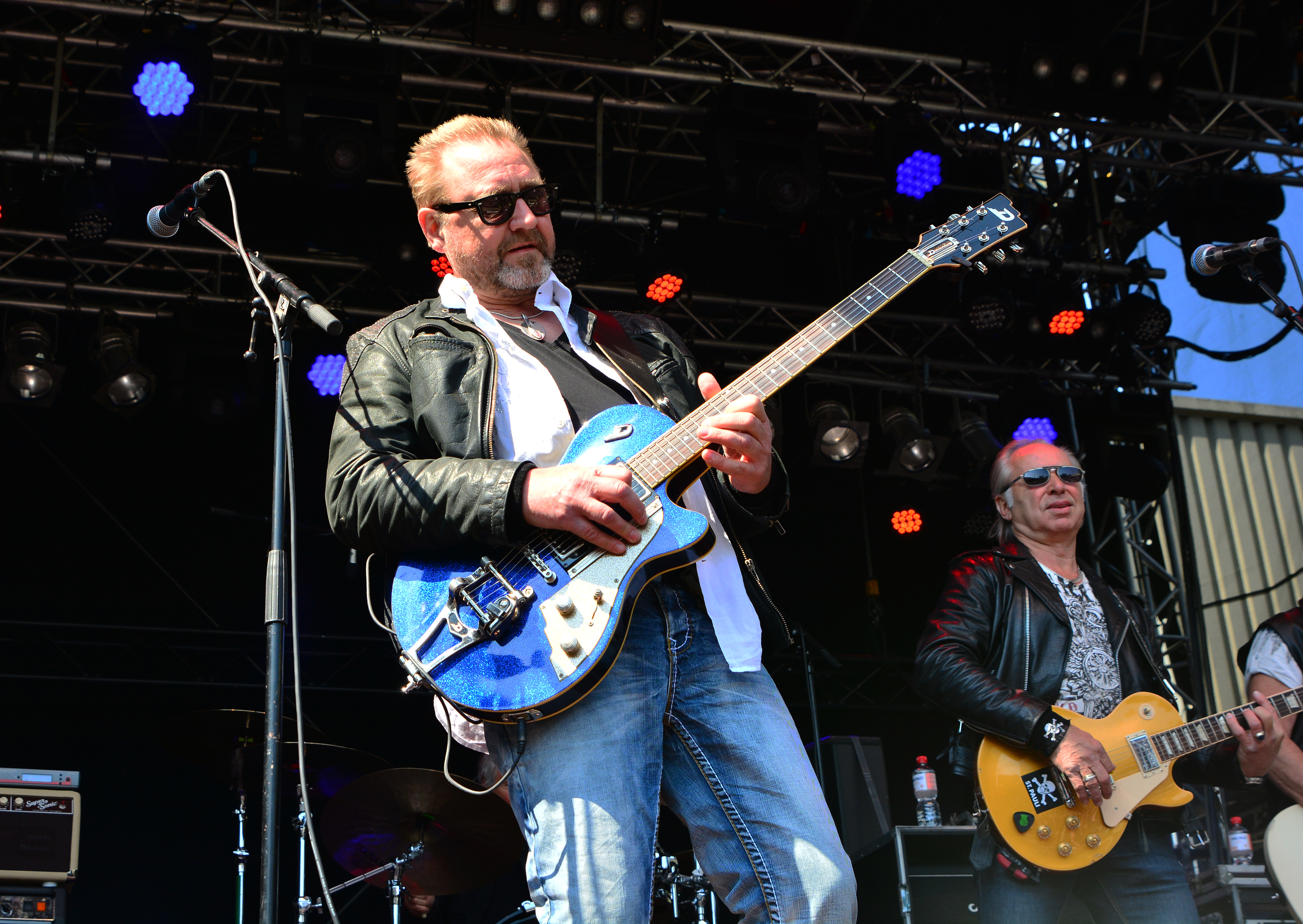
Manfred Kraski

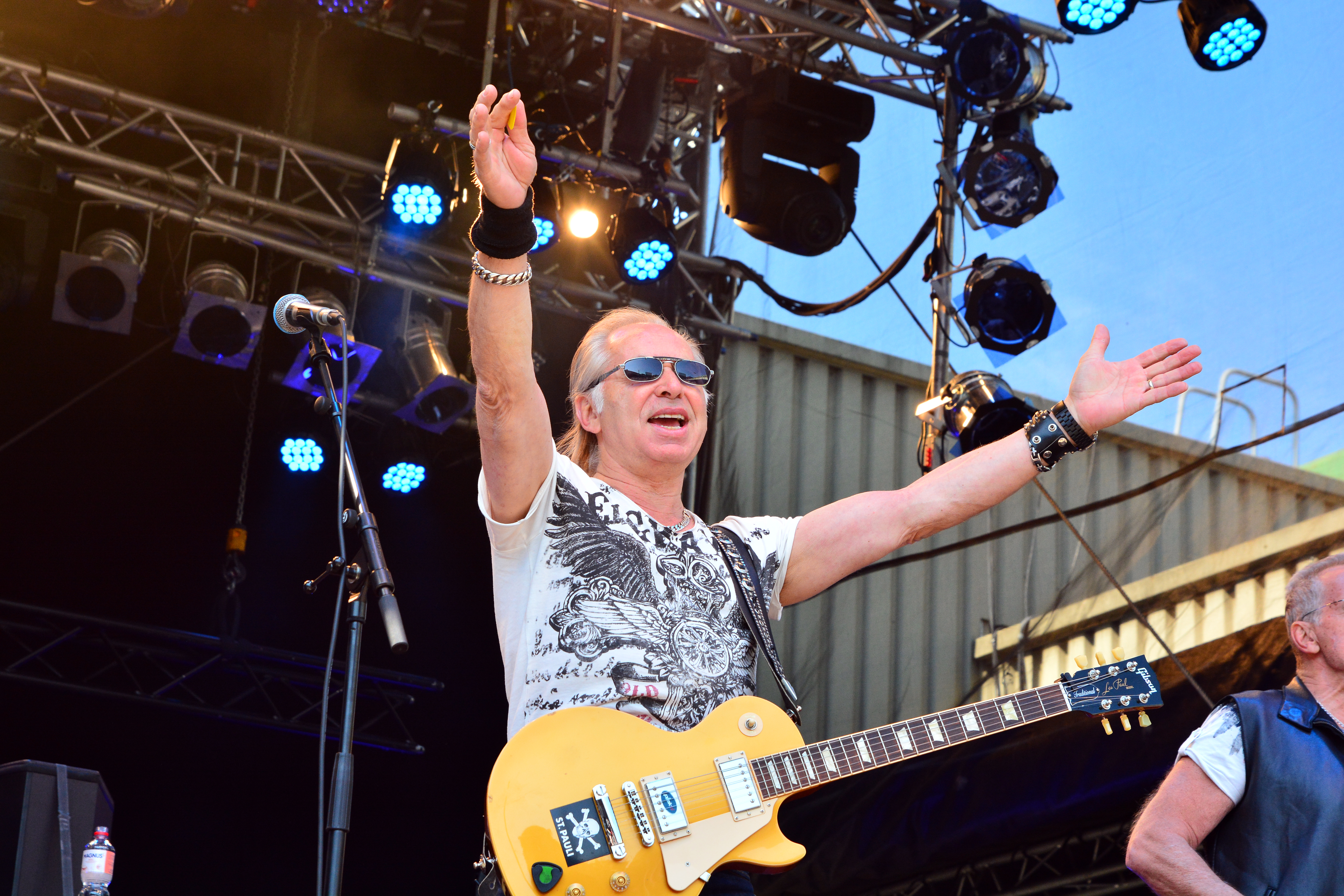
Eggert Johannsen

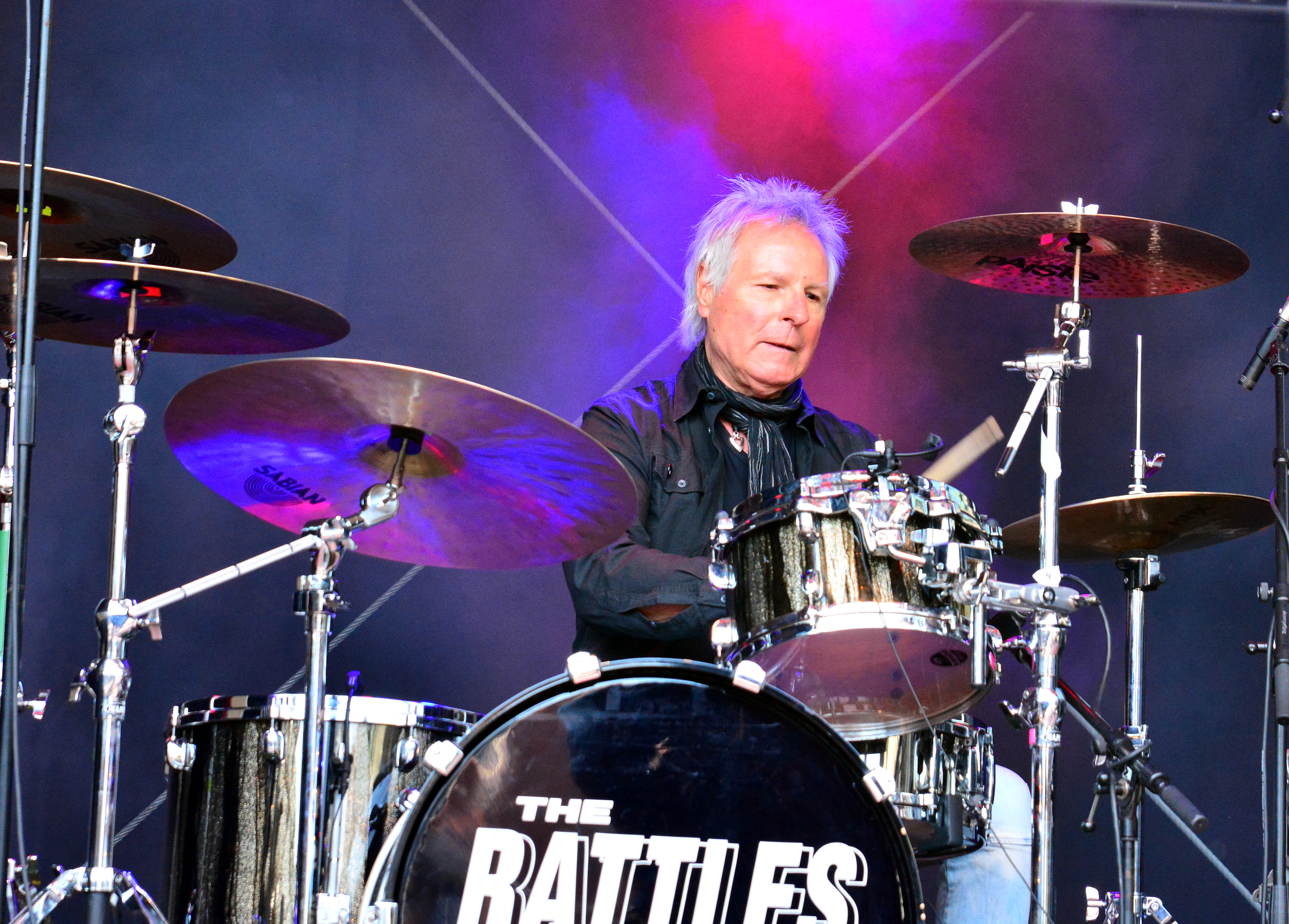
Reinhard "Dicky" Tarrach

Current members

- Herbert Hildebrandt – bass (1960–68, 1988–present)
- Reinhard "Dicky" Tarrach – drums (1963–67, 1988–present)
- Manfred Kraski – vocals, guitar (1991–present)
- Eggert Johannsen – guitar (1994–present)
- Frank Seidel – keyboards (1996–present)

Former members

- Achim Reichel – vocals, guitar (1960–66, 1988–91)
- Dieter Sadlowsky – drums (1960–63)
- Volker Reinhold – guitar, vocals (1960–61)
- Hans Joachim "Hajo" Kreutzfeld – guitar (1961–65)
- Hermann "Rugy" Rugenstein – guitar, vocals (1965–68)
- Frank Dostal – vocals (1966–67)
- Rainer Degner – guitar, vocals (1967–69)
- Bernd Schulz – keyboards (1967–68)
- Henner Hoier – keyboards, vocals (1968–70, 1988–93)
- Kurt "Zappo" Lüngen – bass (1968–73, 1974)
- Peter "Peet" Becker – drums (1968–70)
- Georg "George" Meier – guitar, vocals (1969–70, 1974–77)
- Frank Mille – guitar, vocals (1970–77)
- Edna Bejarano – vocals (1970–73)
- Herbert Bornholdt – drums (1973)
- Jochen "Lu Lafayette" Peters – keyboards (1973–77)
- Linda Fields – vocals (1974–77)
- Wolfgang "Al" Brock – drums (1974)
- George Miller – drums (1975–77)
- Franz "Piggy" Jarnach – keyboards, vocals (1991–95)

== Discography ==
=== Singles ===
| Year | Singles | A | GER | UK | USA |
|---|---|---|---|---|---|
| 1965 | "La La La" | - | 19 | - | - |
| 1965 | "(Stoppin') In Las Vegas" | - | 20 | - | - |
| 1966 | "Come on and Sing" | - | 11 | - | - |
| 1966 | "Love of My Life" | - | 16 | - | - |
| 1966 | "It Is Love" | - | 26 | - | - |
| 1967 | "Cauliflower" | - | 25 | - | - |
| 1968 | "After Tea" | - | 26 | - | - |
| 1969 | "Geraldine" | - | - | - | - |
| 1970 | "The Witch" | 20 | 4 | 8 | 79 |
| 1971 | "You Can't Have Sunshine Every Day" | - | 45 | - | - |
| 1971 | "Devil's on the Loose" | - | 38 | - | - |
| 1972 | "Money Making Machine" | - | - | - | - |
| 1988 | "Hot Wheels" | - | 47 | - | - |

=== Albums ===
- Twist im Star-Club (1963)
- Twist-Time im Star-Club Hamburg (1964)
- Live im Star-Club Hamburg (1964)
- The Searchers Meet the Rattles (1964)
- Rattles (1965)
- Star Club Show 1 (1966)
- Liverpool Beat (1966)
- Hurra, die Rattles kommen (Soundtrack to the film of the same name) (1966)
- Remember Finale Ligure (1967)
- The Witch (1971)
- Tonight Starring Edna (1972)
- Gin Mill (1974)
- Attention (1975)
- Hot Wheels (1988)
- Painted Warrior (1990)
- New Wonderland (1993)
- Live (1997)
- Say Yeah! (2007)

=== Compilation albums ===
- Die deutschen Singles A&B (1963–1965), Vol. 1 (2000)
- Die deutschen Singles A&B (1965–1969), Vol. 2 (2000)
- Come On And Sing – Best (2004)
- Goldene für die Rattles (1970)
- Greatest Hits (1997)
