= Die Deutschen =

German TV documentary

- Genre: Documentary, history
- Starring: Hans Mittermüller; David C. Bunners; Mickey Hardt; Gabriel Spahiu; Guntbernt Warns; Bernd Gnann; Georg Prang; Stefan Jürgens; Ulrich Wiggers; Yasmina Djaballah; Adrian Vancica; Hansjürgen Hürrig; Cristian Motiu; Steffen Münster; Susann Uplegger; Mircea Caraman; Vlad Rădescu; Constantin Draganescu; Udo Schenk; Benjamin Morik; Michael Pink
- Country of origin: Germany
- Original language: German
- No. of seasons: 2+
- No. of episodes: 20

Production
- Running time: 43 minutes
- Production company: Gruppe 5 Filmproduktion

Original release
- Network: ZDF
- Release: Season 1: 26 October 2008 on ZDF, season 2: 13 November 2010 on ZDFneo

Die Deutschen (“The Germans”) is a German television documentary produced for ZDF that first aired from October to November 2008. Each episode recounts a selected epoch of German history, beginning (first season) with the reign of Otto the Great and ending with the collapse of the German Empire at the end of the First World War. In November 2010 the second season of Die Deutschen was published in German television (ZDF and ZDFneo), beginning with Charlemagne, the Frankish King, and ending with Gustav Stresemann, the Chancellor and Foreign Minister during the Weimar Republic.

Historical events are recreated through a combination of live action scenes and computer generated animations. The series was filmed at over 200 different locations in Germany, Malta, and Romania at a cost of approximately €500,000 per episode.

== First season ==
#	Title in English	German Title	Original Air Date
1	Otto and the Empire	Otto und das Reich	26 October 2008
2	Heinrich and the Pope	Heinrich und der Papst	28 October 2008
3	Barbarossa and the Lion	Barbarossa und der Löwe	2 November 2008
4	Luther and the Nation	Luther und die Nation	4 November 2008
5	Wallenstein and the War	Wallenstein und der Krieg	9 November 2008
6	Frederick the Great and the Empress	Preußens Friedrich und die Kaiserin	11 November 2008
7	Napoleon and the Germans	Napoleon und die Deutschen	16 November 2008
8	Robert Blum and the Revolution	Robert Blum und die Revolution	18 November 2008
9	Bismarck and the German Empire	Bismarck und das Deutsche Reich	23 November 2008
10	Wilhelm and the World	Wilhelm und die Welt	25 November 2008

== Second season ==
#	Title in English	German Title	Original Air Date
1	Charlemagne and the Saxons	Karl der Große und die Sachsen	13 November 2010
2	Frederick II and the Crusade	Friedrich II. und der Kreuzzug	13 November 2010
3	Hildegard of Bingen and the Power of Women	Hildegard von Bingen und die Macht der Frauen	20 November 2010
4	Charles IV and the Black Death	Karl IV. und der Schwarze Tod	20 November 2010
5	Thomas Müntzer and the Peasants' War	Thomas Müntzer und der Krieg der Bauern	27 November 2010
6	Augustus the Strong and Love	August der Starke und die Liebe	27 November 2010
7	Karl Marx and the Class Struggle	Karl Marx und der Klassenkampf	4 December 2010
8	Ludwig II and the Bavarians	Ludwig II. und die Bayern	4 December 2010
9	Rosa Luxemburg and Freedom	Rosa Luxemburg und die Freiheit	11 December 2010
10	Gustav Stresemann and the Republic	Gustav Stresemann und die Republik	11 December 2010

== See also ==
- America: The Story of Us
