= Kom(m)ödchen =

Privately owned theater in Dusseldorf, Germany

Coordinates: 51°13′38″N 6°46′32″E

The Kom(m)ödchen is a cabaret stage in Düsseldorf.

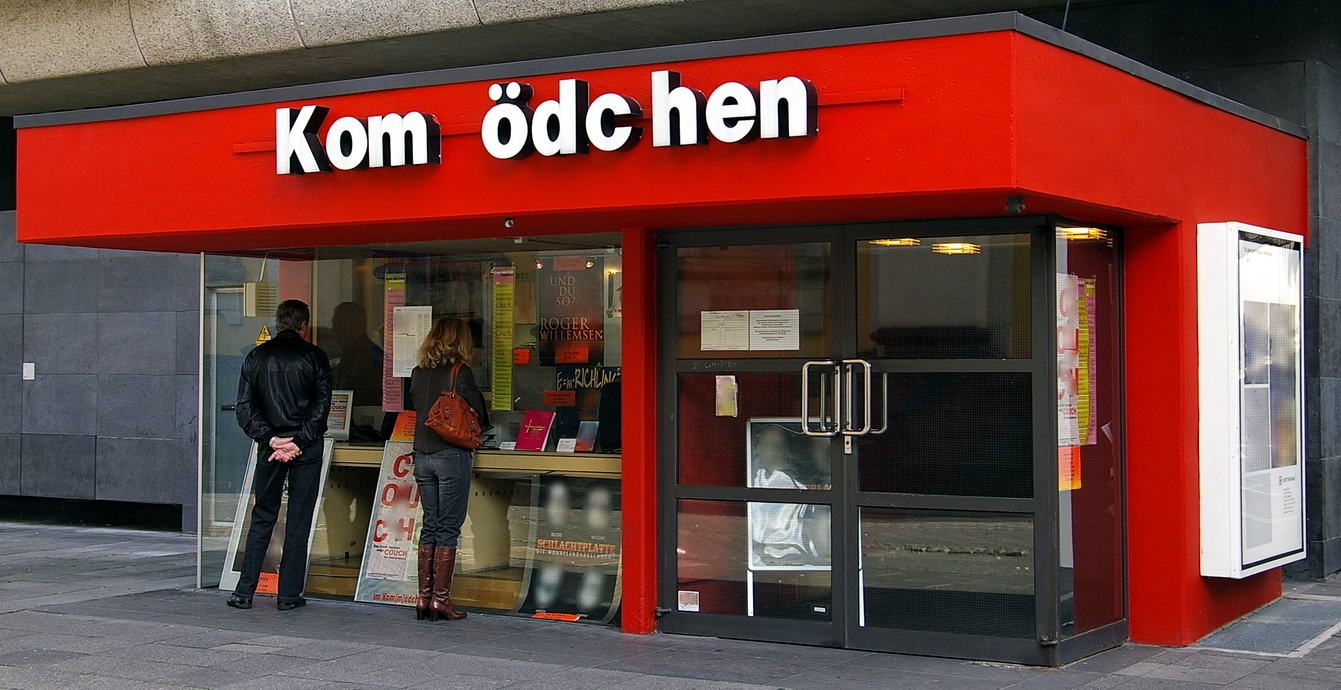
Front (2006)

The Kom(m)ödchen was created in 1947 as a political-literary cabaret by Kay and Lore Lorentz. Other participants in the initial program "Positiv dagegen", which had its premiere on March 29, 1947, were Werner Vielhaber, Bernd Nesselhut, Hans Walter Clasen, Eduard Marwitz, Iris Fanslau, and Ruth Henrichs. Hanne Wieder was also part of the ensemble in its first year. In 1959 the television transmission of the program was banned for a year.

The theater moved to its present location on April 27, 1967, and its stage and props were moved to the new location by guests during the intermission of a performance.

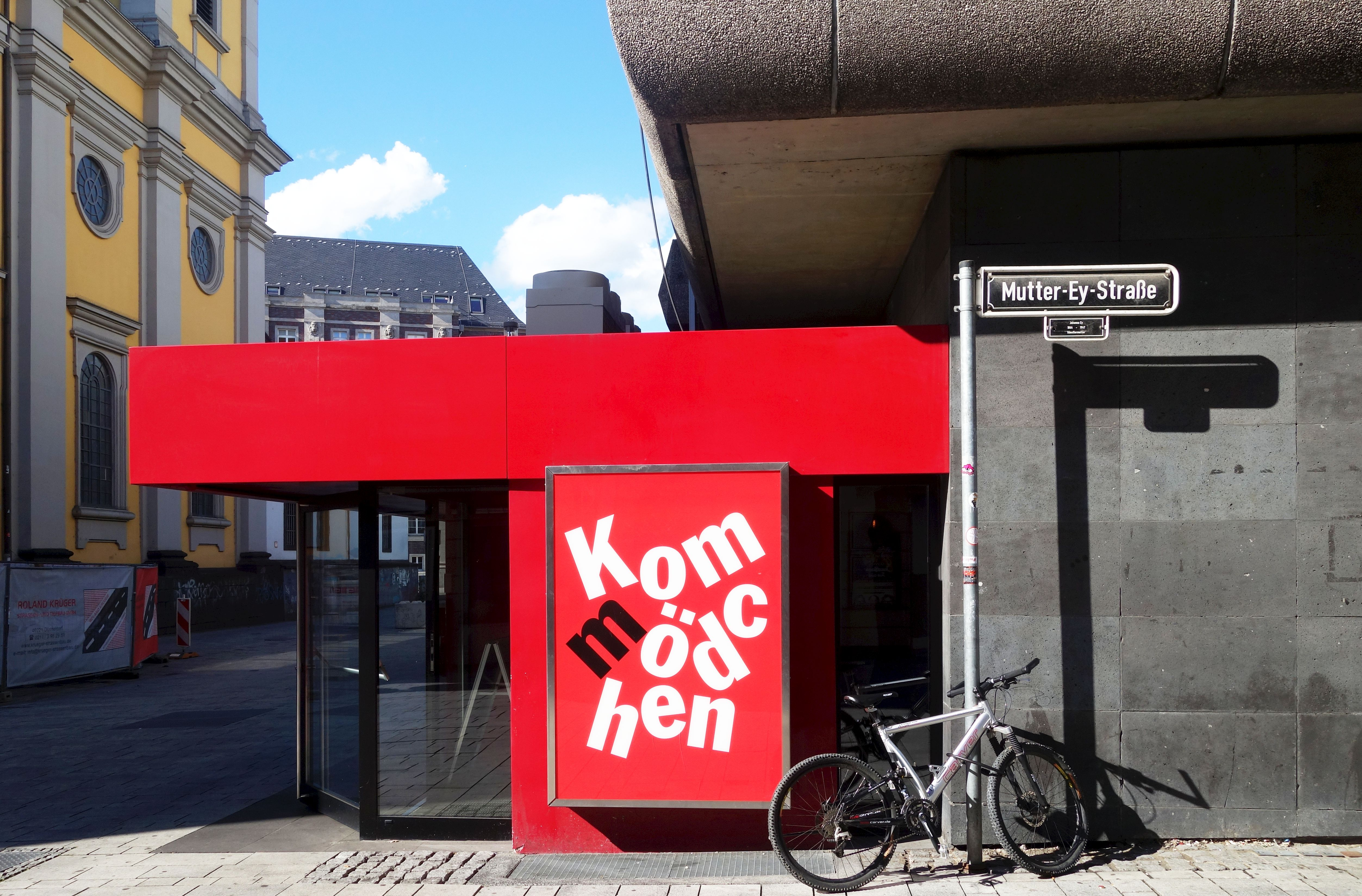
Side (2026)

In 1983, Lore Lorentz decided to pursue solo appearances and left the Kom(m)ödchen ensemble. Kay Lorentz stayed and continued to build a new ensemble. With his death in 1993, Lore gave up her solo career and returned to lead the Kom(m)ödchen. She gave the leadership to her son Kay S. Lorentz, who has continued since Lore's death in 1994.

The public square in front of the theater was renamed the "Kay-und-Lore-Lorentz-Platz" in their honor, and there is also a city school named the "Lore Lorentz Schule".

Well-known members of the ensemble have included Thomas Freitag, Harald Schmidt, Hugo Egon Balder, and Volker Pispers. The journalist and poet Thaddäus Troll wrote scripts for the cabaret in the early 1950s.

== Releases ==
- Wenn es dem Kom(m)ödchen nicht gefällt ..., Ein Kabarett in Deutschland. Droste 2000, ISBN 3-7700-1111-2
- CD "Amok in Erkrath" Kom(m)ödchen-Ensemble, ISBN 3-931265-25-0
