= Dittsche =

German improvisation comedy television show

Coordinates: 53°34′49″N 9°58′05″E

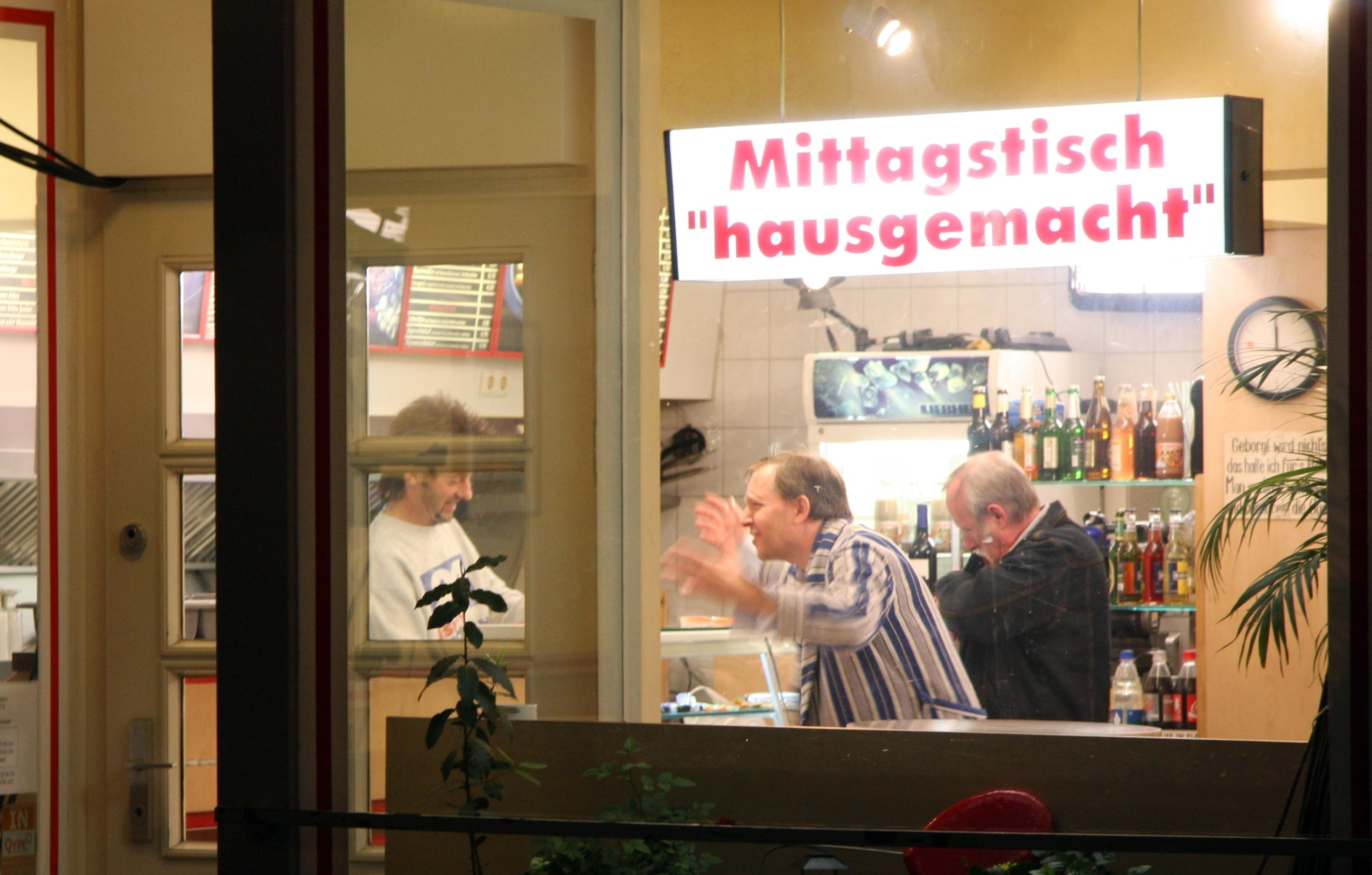
The diner during a film shot (exterior view)

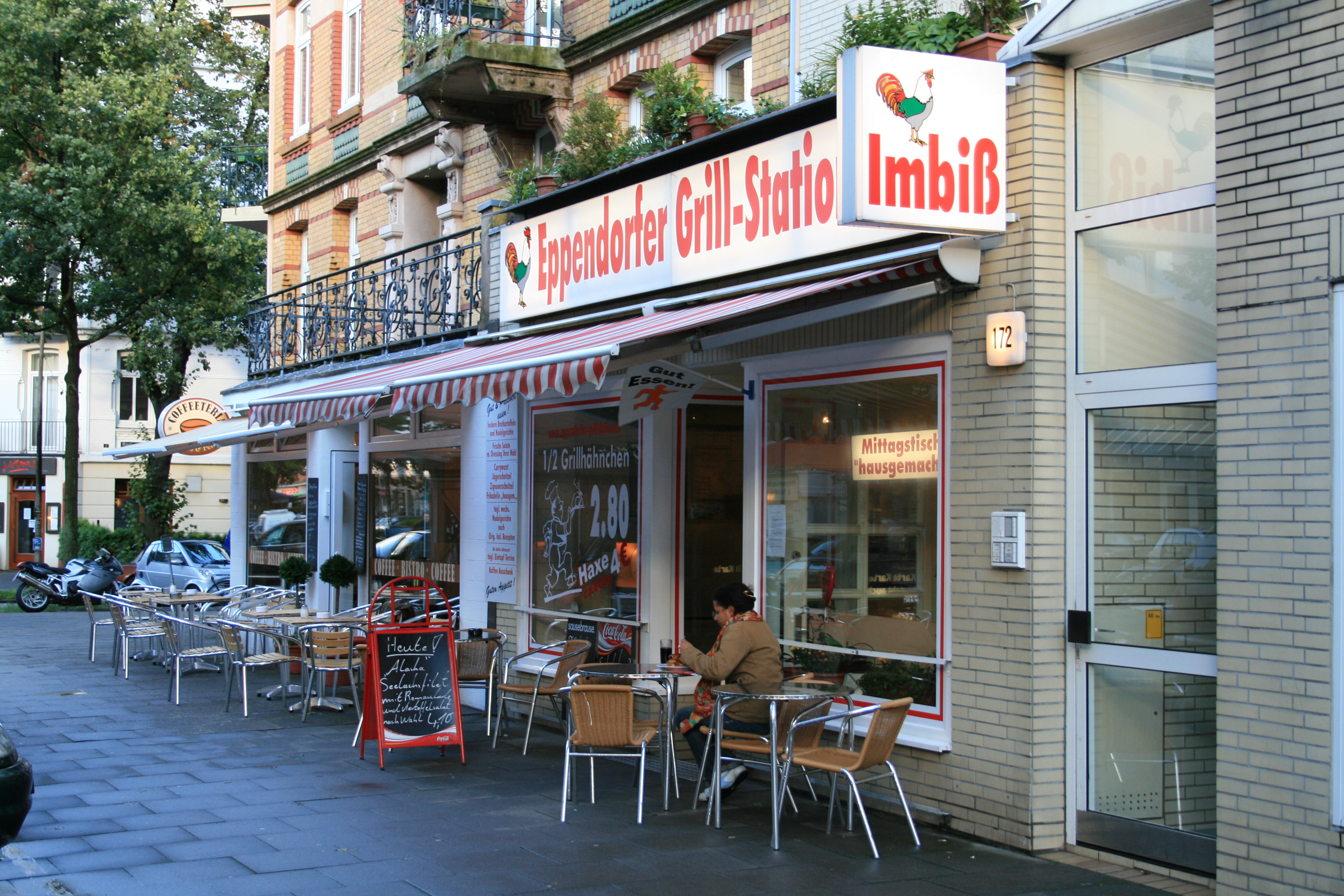
The film location: a real diner in Hamburg

Dittsche: Das wirklich wahre Leben (English: The Really Real Life) is a German improvisation comedy television show starring Olli Dittrich and Jon Flemming Olsen.

Olli Dittrich plays the unemployed Dittsche, who frequents a local fast food diner and converses with the proprietor about current events, drawing heavily on bizarre tabloid headlines to formulate perplexingly insane theories about their background. Schildkröte (German word for turtle), a bar regular (played by Franz Jarnach), looks on mostly passively in the background.

The show is unscripted and is broadcast live from a real fast food diner in Hamburg. One special feature of the show is the camera perspective, which changes in a fixed pattern and is digitally processed to mimic surveillance cameras. The show also features many celebrities from German TV and sports, who appear as customers of the diner.

== Sources ==
- www.wdr.de
