= Achim Reichel =

German musician

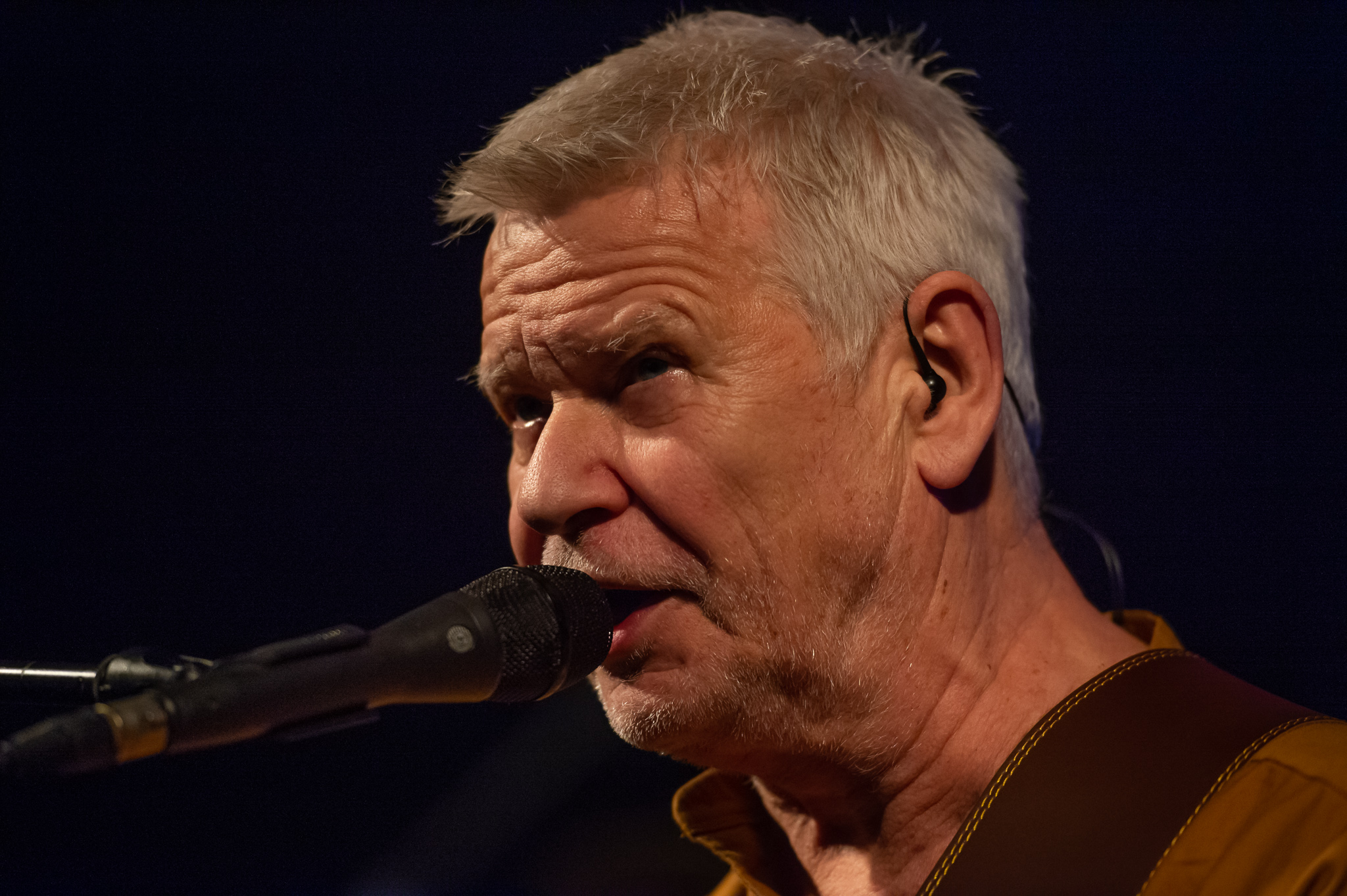
- Reichel performing in 2019

Background information
- Born: 28 January 1944 (age 82); Hamburg, Germany
- Genres: Pop rock; krautrock; psychedelic rock; folk rock
- Occupations: Musician, songwriter, producer
- Instruments: Vocals, guitar, piano
- Formerly of: The Rattles
- Website: achim-reichel.de

Achim Reichel (born 28 January 1944) is a German singer, musician, producer and songwriter from Hamburg. He is known for his 1991 hit single Aloha Heja He, and serving as the frontman for the 1960s beat group The Rattles, who, among other achievements, were selected to open for The Beatles on their last tour of Europe in 1966.

In 1968, he co-founded the psychedelic pop group Wonderland, which also included English ex-patriate Les Humphries who would soon start his own Les Humphries Singers. In 1971, Reichel left the group for his own progressive Krautrock solo project, A. R. & Machines, of which the first album Die grüne Reise (The green journey) was critically acclaimed and likened to bands such as Kraftwerk and Tangerine Dream.

Since 1975, Reichel has taken a keen interest in recording traditional German songs and classic poetry as modern-style music, which includes such albums as Dat Shanty Alb'm (1975), Klabautermann (1977), Regenballade (1977), Fledermaus (1988), Wilder Wassermann (2002), and Volxlieder (2006).

In 2021, Aloha Heja He went viral in China after thirty years of its original release.

== Discography ==
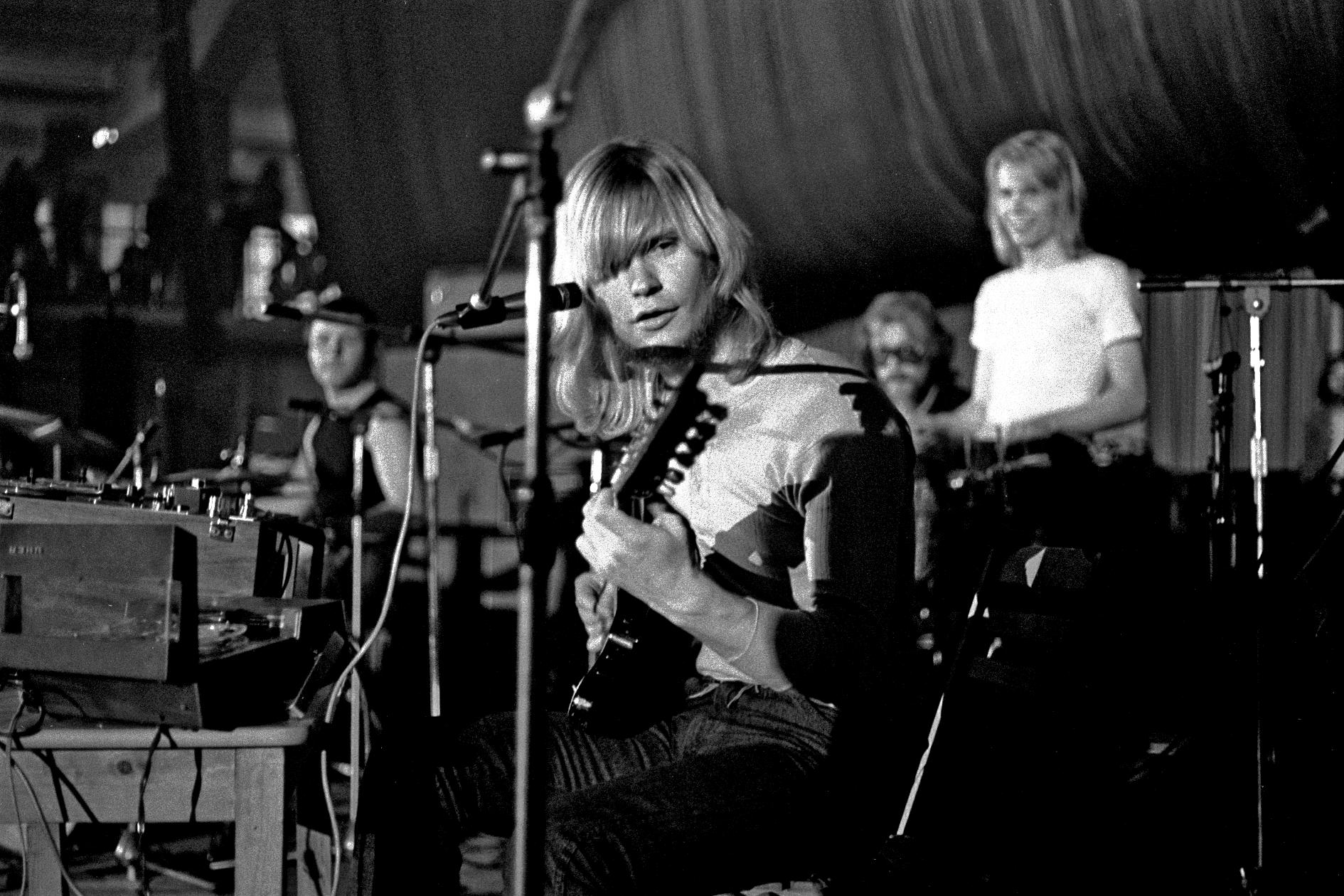
Reichel performing in 1971

- Dat Shanty Alb'm (1976)
- Klabautermann (1977)
- Regenballade (1977)
- Heiße Scheibe (1979)
- Ungeschminkt (1980)
- Blues in Blond (1981)
- Nachtexpress (1983)
- Eine Ewigkeit unterwegs (1986)
- Fledermaus (1988)
- Was Echtes (1989)
- Melancholie und Sturmflut (1991)
- Wahre Liebe (1993)
- Nachtexpress (1994)
- Große Freiheit (1994)
- Oh ha! (1996)
- Herz ist Trumpf – Das Beste von Achim Reichel (1997, best-of)
- Entspann dich (1999)
- Wilder Wassermann – Balladen & Mythen (2002)
- 100 % Leben (2004, live album)
- Volxlieder (2006)
- Michels Gold (2008)
- Solo mit euch – Mein Leben, meine Musik, gesungen und erzählt (2010, live album)
- Raureif (2015)
- Das Beste (2019)

=== With A.R. & Machines ===
- Die grüne Reise (1971)
- Echo (1972)
- AR3 (1972)
- AR IV (1973)
- AR5 Autovision (1974)
- Erholung (A.R. & Machines Live) (1973)
