= Edna Bejarano =

German singer

Edna Bejarano (born 1951) is an Israeli-born German singer. She was born in 1951 in Tel Aviv, the daughter of Esther Bejarano (née Loewy) and Nissim Bejarano. The family moved to Germany in 1960. She was the lead singer of the German rock band The Rattles from 1970 until 1973 and sang on their biggest selling record, the 1970 song "The Witch", which sold over one million copies globally.

She also performed in the 1980s with her mother Esther Bejarano, one of the last survivors of the Women's Orchestra of Auschwitz, in the musical group Coincidence. They sang songs from the ghetto and in Hebrew as well as anti-fascist songs.
