= Olli Dittrich =

German television personality, comedian, actor, and musician

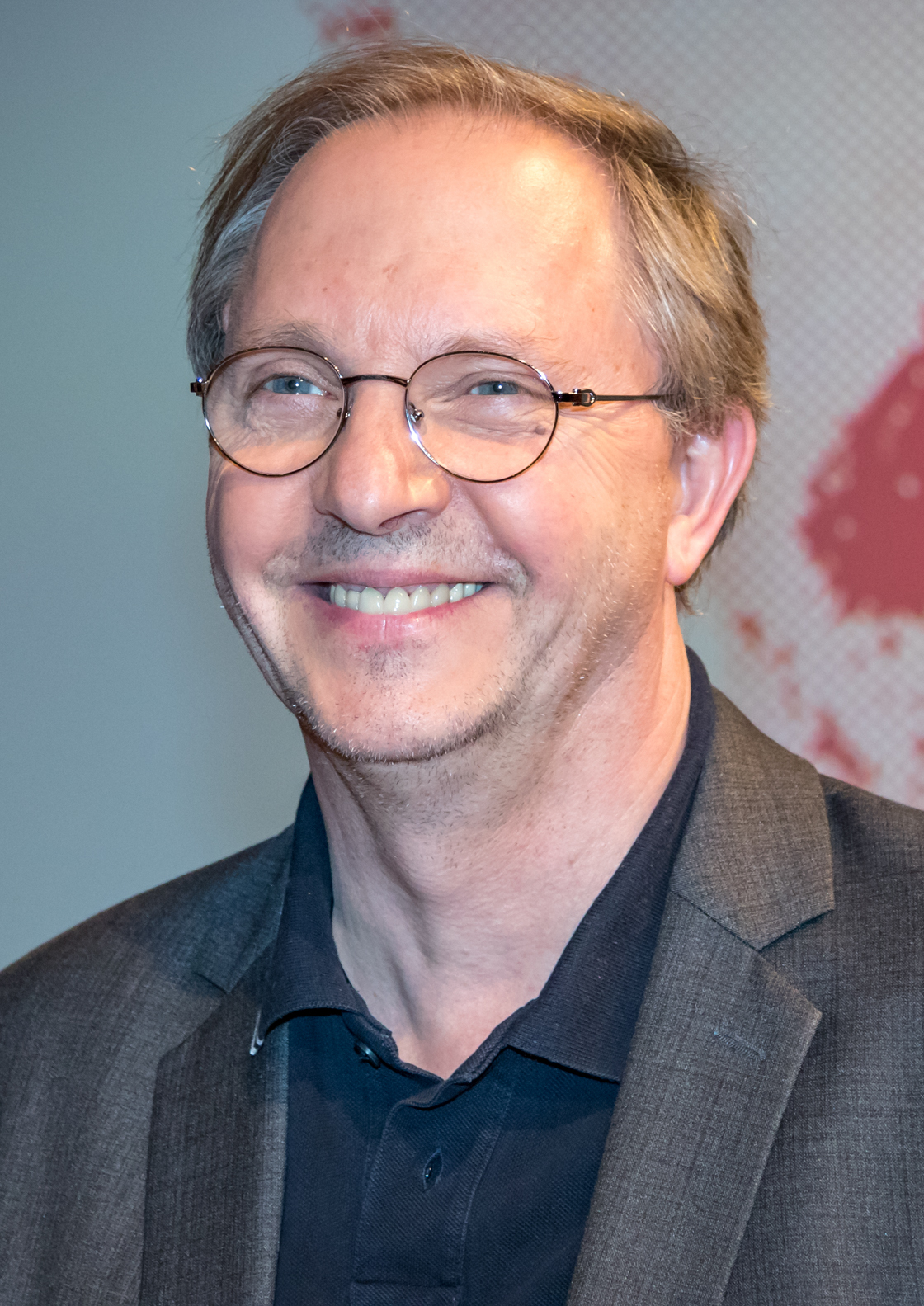
- Dittrich in 2017
- Born: Oliver Michael Dittrich; 20 November 1956 (age 69); Offenbach am Main, West Germany
- Occupations: Television personality; Comedian; Actor; Musician

Oliver Michael Dittrich (born 20 November 1956) is a German television personality, comedian, actor, and musician.

== Life ==
Dittrich completed a three year-education as a theatre painter in the Hamburg State Opera (1975–1978). At the same time, he started his professional career as a musician, composer, and songwriter.

Dittrich became famous in Germany for his work as an actor and comedian in the comedy television show RTL Samstag Nacht. He appeared in films and TV series but has also performed live on stage. He sang and played in the band Die Doofen with Wigald Boning, which sold over 1,5 mio copies with only two albums. In 1995, the duo started playing as one of the supporting acts with Jon Bon Jovi on his stadium tour through Germany. As a musician, Dittrich plays in the band Texas Lightning, who also had a No. 1 hit ("No No Never") and Top 5 album. The band represented Germany at the Eurovision Song Contest in 2006.

After working on the programme RTL Samstag Nacht for five years, Dittrich appeared in many television programmes, shows or films, such as Blind Date, Frühstücksfernsehen, and Dittsche. Currently, Dittrich is regarded in Germany as being one of the most versatile actors, specialized in creating fictional characters.

== Works ==
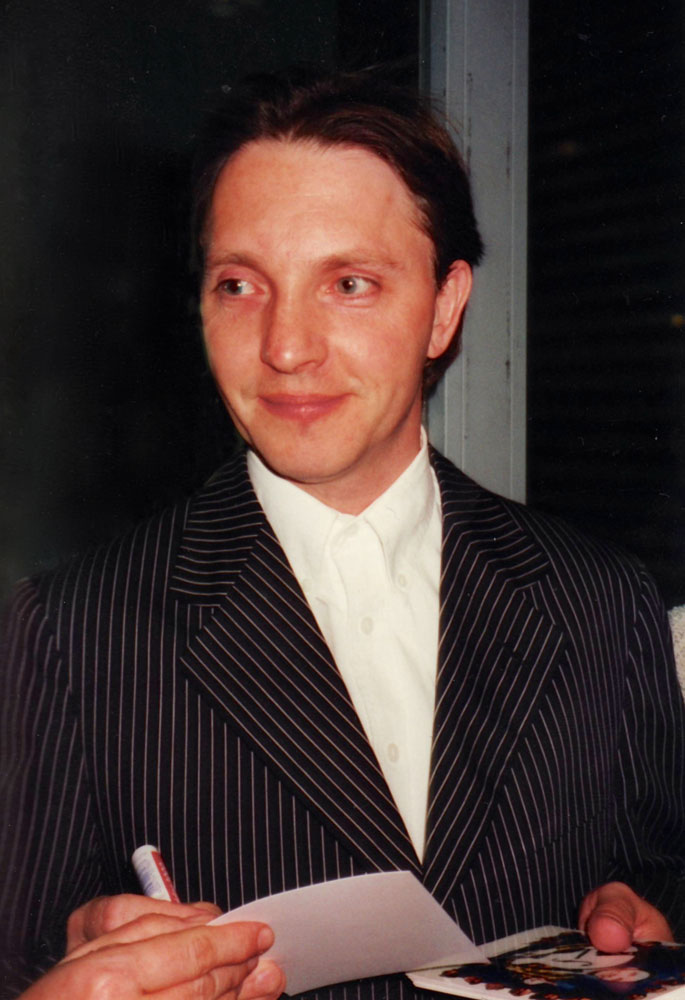
Dittrich during the 1990s

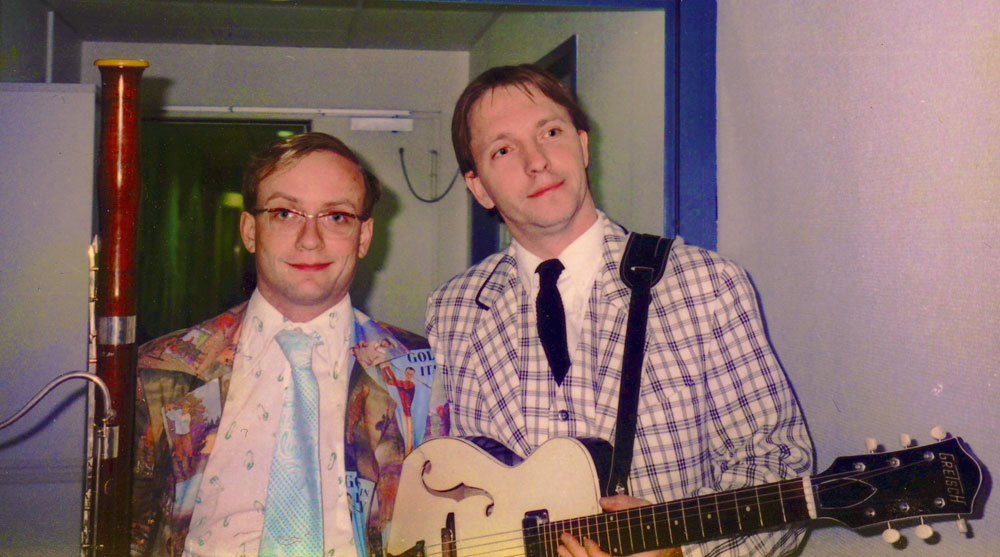
Dittrich (right) and Wigald Boning as 'Die Doofen' in 1997

=== Films ===
- 1997: Der Neffe (TV film)
- 1998: Quest for Camelot (Animation film), German Voice of "Devon"
- 1999: Mrs. Rettich, Czerni and I, as Bart
- 1999: Late Show, as Wollner
- 2004: Stauffenberg (TV film), as Goebbels
- 2004: Der Wixxer, as Dieter Dubinski
- 2006: 7 Zwerge – Der Wald ist nicht genug, as Pinocchio
- 2009: Same Same but Different, as Ben's father
- 2010: Ottos Eleven, as Harry Hirsch
- 2011: Carl & Bertha (TV film), as Gottlieb Daimler
- 2011: Pigeons on the Roof
- 2013: King Ordinary, as Thomas Müller
- 2013: Buddy

=== Television ===
- 1991: Bonings Bonbons
- 1993-1998: RTL Samstag Nacht (148 Shows)
- 2000–2001: Olli, Tiere, Sensationen (TV series, 16 Shows)
- 2001–2007: Blind Date (Impro-Series with Anke Engelke, 6 episodes)
- 2003–2011: Genial Daneben (Guest)
- since 2004: Dittsche (over 200 episodes, still running), as Dittsche
- 2006: Was tun, Herr Beckenbauer? (Harald Schmidt Spezial, TV-Special), as Franz Beckenbauer
- 2009: Pastewka (TV series), Special guest
- 2010: Nachtschicht (TV series), episode: Ein Mord zu viel, as Herrenausstatter
- 2013: Frühstücksfernsehen (TV-Persiflage Part 1, with Cordula Stratmann)
- 2014: Das TalkGespräch (TV-Persiflage Part 2, with Cordula Stratmann)
- 2015: Schorsch Aigner – Der Mann, der Franz Beckenbauer war (TV-Persiflage Part 3)
- 2015: Das FIFA-Märchen – Fragen an Schorsch Aigner (TV-Persiflage Part 4)
- 2015: Jennifer – Sehnsucht nach was Besseres (TV miniseries, 3 episodes), as Dietmar
- 2016: Der Sandro-Report: Zahlemann live (TV-Persiflage Part 5)
- 2016: Selbstgespräche mit Konstantin Pfau (TV-Persiflage Part 6)
- 2017: Der Meisterreporter – Sigmar Seelenbrecht wird 81 (TV-Persiflage Part 7)
- 2017: Trixie Wonderland – Weihnachten mit Trixie Dörfel
- 2018: Trixie Nightmare – Der tiefe Fall der Trixie Dörfel
- 2019: FRUST – das Magazin

=== Music ===
- Die Doofen
- Texas Lightning

== Awards ==
=== Television ===
- 1994: Bayerischer Fernsehpreis for RTL Samstag Nacht
- 1994: Bambi for RTL-Samstag Nacht
- 1995: Bambi for Die Doofen
- 1995: Adolf-Grimme-Preis"Spezial" for "Zwei Stühle – Eine Meinung" (RTL Samstag Nacht)
- 1995: Goldene Europa for "Die Doofen“
- 1995: Goldene Romy (Austria) for "RTL-Samstag Nacht“
- 2003: Bayerischer Fernsehpreis for "Blind Date" (ZDF)
- 2003: Adolf-Grimme-Preis with Gold for "Blind Date" (ZDF)
- 2004: Deutscher Fernsehpreis for "Dittsche – das wirklich wahre Leben" (WDR)
- 2005: Adolf-Grimme-Preis with Gold for "Dittsche – das wirklich wahre Leben" (WDR)
- 2007: DVD-Award for "Dittsche – das wirklich wahre Leben“
- 2008: Radio Regenbogen-Award – "Beste Comedy “
- 2009: Goldene Kamera – "Best Entertainment“
- 2010: Göttinger Elch – Lifework
- 2011: "Bremen 4 - Comedy-Preis / Ehrenpreis
- 2013: "Das grosse Kleinkunstfestival der Wühlmaeuse" - Ehrenpreis
- 2015: Tegtmeiers Erben – Ehrenpreis
- 2016: Adolf-Grimme-Preis for "Schorsch Aigner - der Mann, der Franz Beckenbauer war"
- 2016: Bayerischer Fernsehpreis for "Schorsch Aigner - der Mann, der Franz Beckenbauer war"
- 2017: Deutscher Comedypreis - Best Actor for "Selbstgespraeche mit Konstantin Pfau", "Der Meisterreporter - Sigmar Seelenbrecht wird 81"
- 2018: Deutscher Comedypreis / Category „Best Sitcom“ Jennifer – Sehnsucht nach was Besseres (Ensemblemember)
- 2019: Prix Pantheon, Honorary Award

=== Music ===
- 1995: Echo for "Die Doofen“
- 1995: Viva COMET for "Die Doofen“
- 1995: Goldene Stimmgabel (ZDF) for "Die Doofen“
- 1996: Golden Reel Award (United States) for "Die Doofen“
- 1995–1996: 7 Gold and Platin Awards for "Die Doofen“
- 2005–2006: 5 Country Music-Awards (diverse Kategorien) for "Texas Lightning“
- 2006: 3 Gold and Platin Awards for "Texas Lightning“

== Honors ==
Asteroid 283141 Dittsche, discovered by German amateur astronomer Rolf Apitzsch in 2008, was named in his honor. The official naming citation was published by the Minor Planet Center on 6 April 2018 (M.P.C. 112434).
