= Volker Pispers =

German kabarett artist (born 1958)

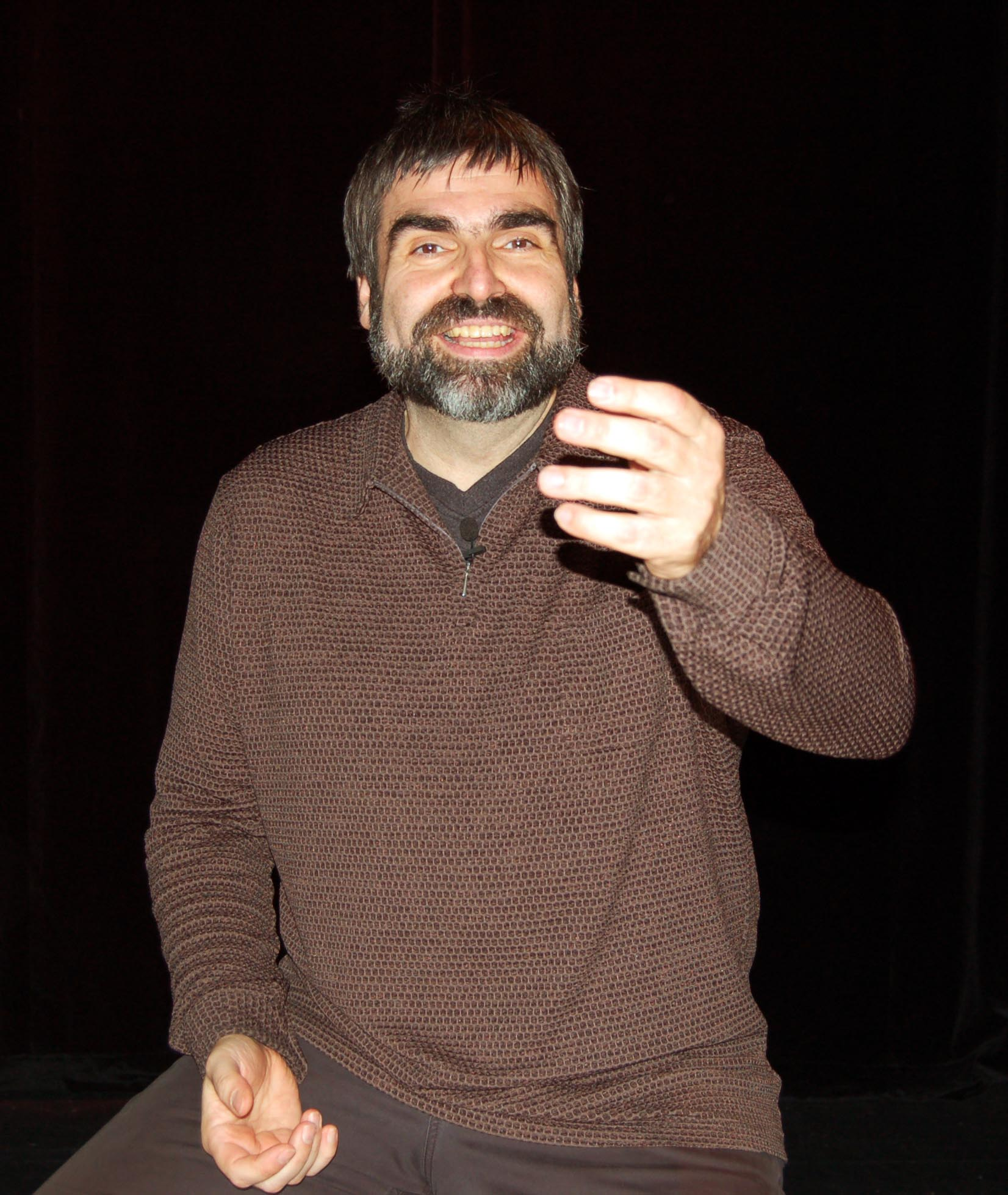
- Pispers in 2006
- Born: 18 January 1958 (age 68); Mönchengladbach-Rheydt, West Germany

Comedy career
- Years active: 1983–2015
- Medium: Kabarett, books, radio
- Genres: Observational comedy, wit/word play, political satire, black comedy
- Subjects: German culture, German language, German and American politics
- Website: pispers.com

Volker Pispers (born 18 January 1958) is a German kabarett artist who is well known for his political satire. His comic style includes drastic and sometimes sarcastic commentary on current events, especially about the political situation in Germany but also about the politics of the United States since 9/11 and during the Iraq War.

== Biography ==
Pispers was born on 18 January 1958 in Rheydt. After his Abitur, Pispers moved to Bonn and later Münster where he studied English, Catholic theology and pedagogy. From 1979 to 1980 he worked as a foreign language assistant in England, where he developed a liking for black comedy.

After returning to West Germany, he worked as a member of several children's theatre and cabaret arrangements. His first solo programme, Kabarette sich, wer kann (a pun on "rette sich, wer kann" – "save yourself if you can"), first opened in 1983. In the same year he finished his education and started working as an English teacher. In 1990, he became a member of the ensemble of the Kom(m)ödchen in Düsseldorf and later on its artistic director. However, in 1991, he gave up this position to tour Germany with his solo programmes. Over the 1990s he received a number of awards and became a well-known figure in German political cabaret.

In 2002 he first went on tour with his programme ...bis neulich (literal translation: "...until recently" - meaning: "until we meet again"), which was originally conceived as a Best of his twenty years in cabaret. It was extremely successful and made him a lot more popular, especially due to his harsh criticism of the George W. Bush administration and the Iraq War. Due to its huge success, Pispers continued to tour Germany with the program, which he frequently updated according to recent developments, until 2015. He has also become a staunch critic of unregulated capitalism.

He currently lives in Düsseldorf-Oberkassel in the German state of North Rhine-Westphalia.

== Works ==
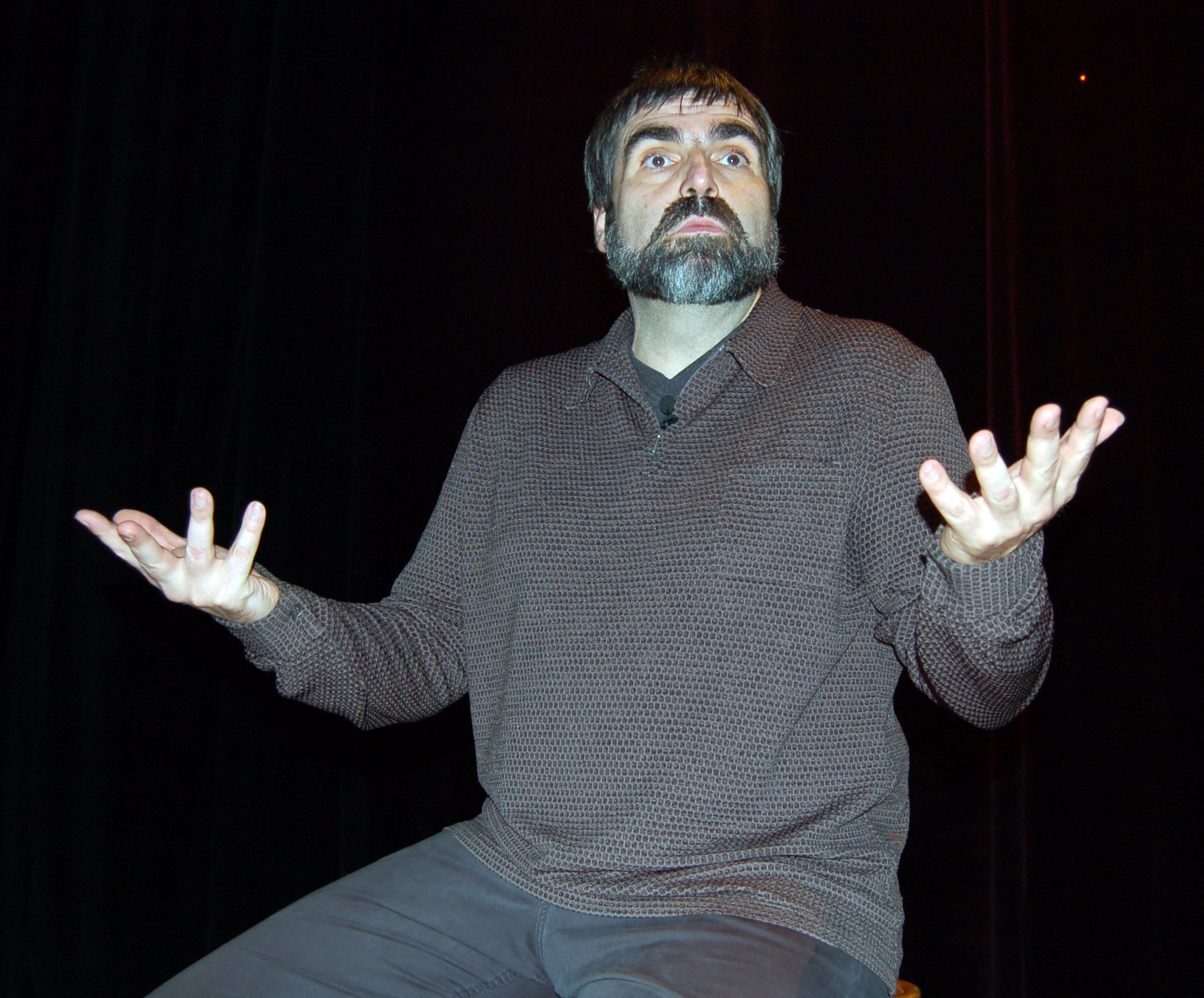
Pispers in 2006

=== Books ===
- 1996: Volkerkunde
- 2001: Gefühlte Wirklichkeiten
- 2003: Volkerkunde (Anniversary Edition)

=== CDs ===
- 1995: Frisch gestrichen
- 1996: Ein Wort ergab das andere
- 1999: Damit müssen Sie rechnen (2 CDs)
- 2000: Update 2000 – Damit müssen Sie rechnen (2 CDs)
- 2002: … bis neulich (2 CDs)
- 2004: … bis neulich 2004 … aktualisierte Fassung (2 CDs)
- 2007: Kabarett Sampler: 3. Politischer Aschermittwoch (2 CDs)
- 2007: … bis neulich 2007… live in Bonn (2 CDs)
- 2009: Volker Pispers live 2009 (2 CDs)
- 2010: … bis neulich 2010 … aktualisierte Fassung (2 CDs)
- 2012: … live 2012 (2 CDs)
- 2014: … bis neulich 2014 (2 CDs)
- 2016: … bis neulich – Der letzte Abend (2 CDs)

=== DVDs ===
- 2004: live in Berlin. … bis neulich (Live in Berlin)
- 2007: … bis neulich 2007… live in Bonn
- 2010: … bis neulich 2010
- 2014: … bis neulich 2014

== Awards ==
- 1988 – Mönchengladbach: Gladbach satire award
- 1989 – Kulturpreis der Sparkassen-Kulturstiftung Rheinland (Sponsorship award)
- 1996 – Mindener Stichling; Deutscher Kleinkunstpreis (cabaret category)
- 1998 – Memminger Maul; Kleinkunstmaske Garching; Gaul von Niedersachsen
- 2000 – AZ-Stern des Jahres of Abendzeitung aus München
- 2003 – Obernburger Ehrenmühlstein
- 2004 – Bocholt, Germany: Bocholter Pepperoni
- 2005 – Cabaret award "Knurrhahn" sponsored by the city of Wilhelmshaven; Deutscher Kabarettpreis (Main award)
- 2006 – Bayerischer Kabarettpreis (Main award)
- 2007 – Morenhovener Lupe
