= Wigald Boning =

German comedian, television presenter, actor, and author

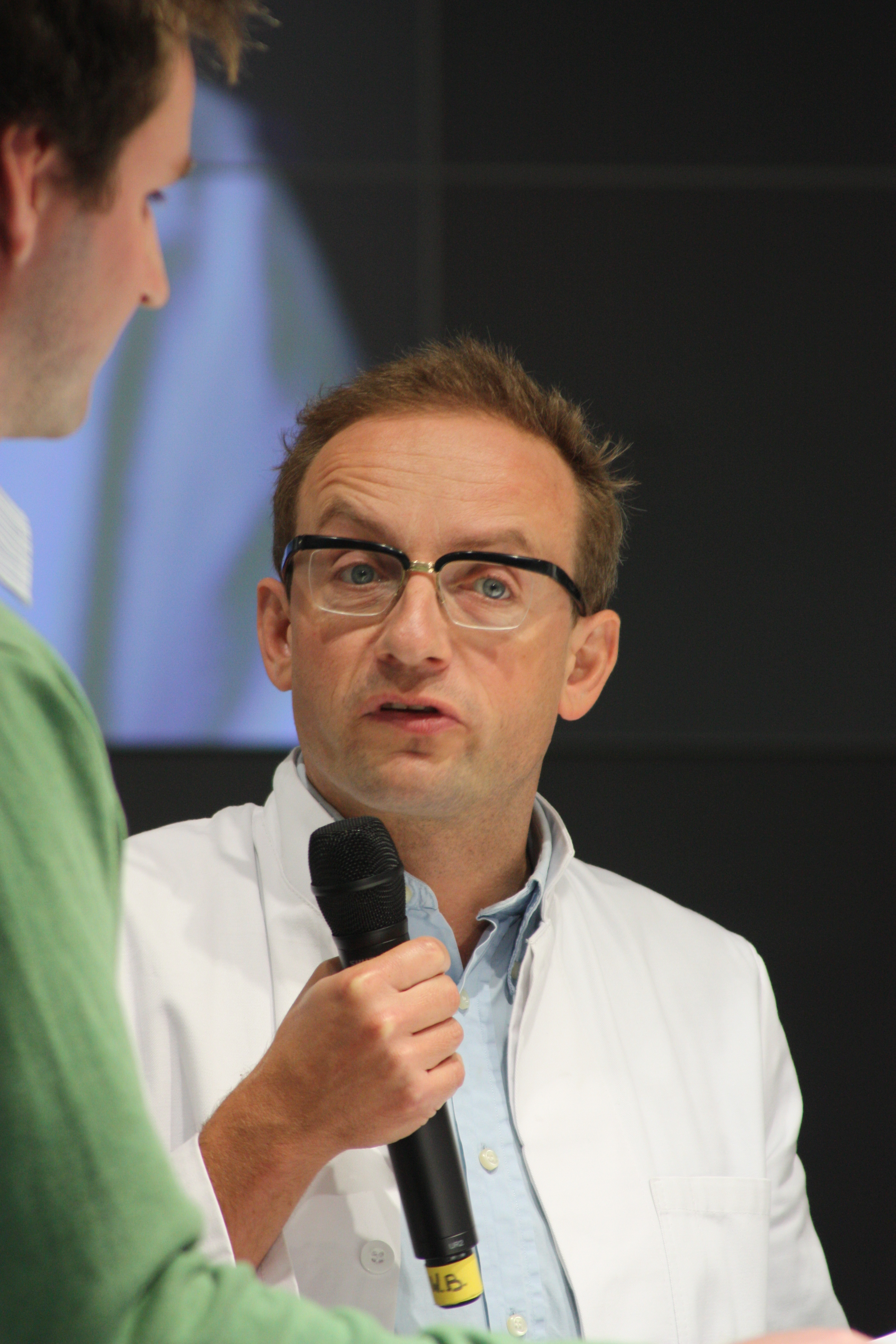
- Boning at the Internationale Funkausstellung Berlin in 2010
- Born: 20 January 1967 (age 59); Wildeshausen, West Germany
- Occupations: Comedian; TV presenter; Actor; Author
- Website: Personal website

Wigald Boning (born 20 January 1967) is a German comedian, television presenter, actor, and author.

Boning has appeared in different TV and film productions in Germany. He became famous as an actor in the television comedy programme RTL Samstag Nacht.

Together with Olli Dittrich, Boning sang in the music group Die Doofen. He has also released several books.

== Personal life ==
In 2017, Boning married German opera singer Teresa Tièschky.

== Works ==
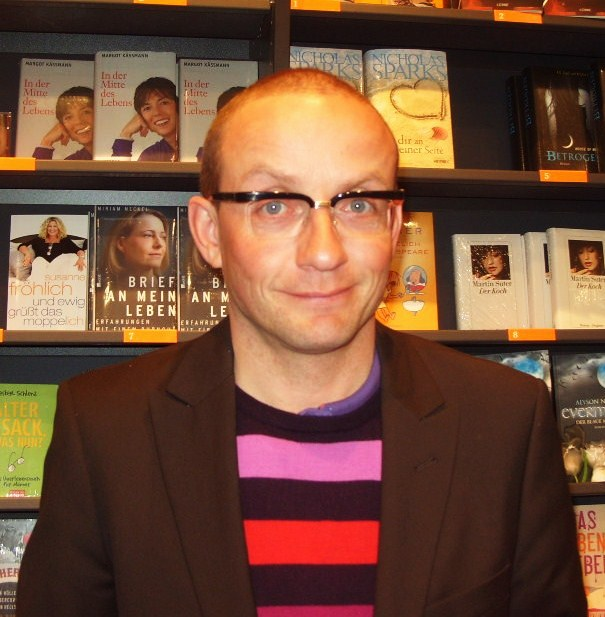
Boning in 2008

=== Film ===
- 1989: Hard Days, Hard Nights
- 1990: Der geile Osten, eine Reise durch die letzten Tage der DDR
- 1996: Babes' Petrol
- 1998: (National Lampoon's) Men in White

=== TV ===
- 1991: Bonings Bonbons
- 1992–1993: Extra 3
- 1993: Canale Grande
- 1993–1998: RTL Samstag Nacht
- 1999: ProSieben MorningShow
- 2001–2002: TV-Quartett
- 2001–2004: WIB-Schaukel
- 2004–2008: Clever! – Die Show, die Wissen schafft
- 2006: Die ProSieben Märchenstunde: Rotkäppchen – Wege zum Glück
- 2006–2007: Extreme Activity
- 2007: FamilyShowdown
- 2009: Clever! Spezial
- 2012: XXS – Hilfe, wir werden geschrumpft!
- since 2017: Genial Daneben
- since 2018: Genial Daneben - Das Quiz

=== Books ===
- 1996: Fliegenklatschen in Aspik, ISBN 3-462-02511-2
- 1998: Unser Land soll schöner werden. Das Programm für Deutschland, ISBN 3-89082-835-3
- 2007: Bekenntnisse eines Nachtsportlers, ISBN 3-499-62192-4
- 2010: In Rio steht ein Hofbräuhaus: Reisen auf fast allen Kontinenten, ISBN 3-499-62580-6

== Awards ==
=== For 'Die Doofen' ===
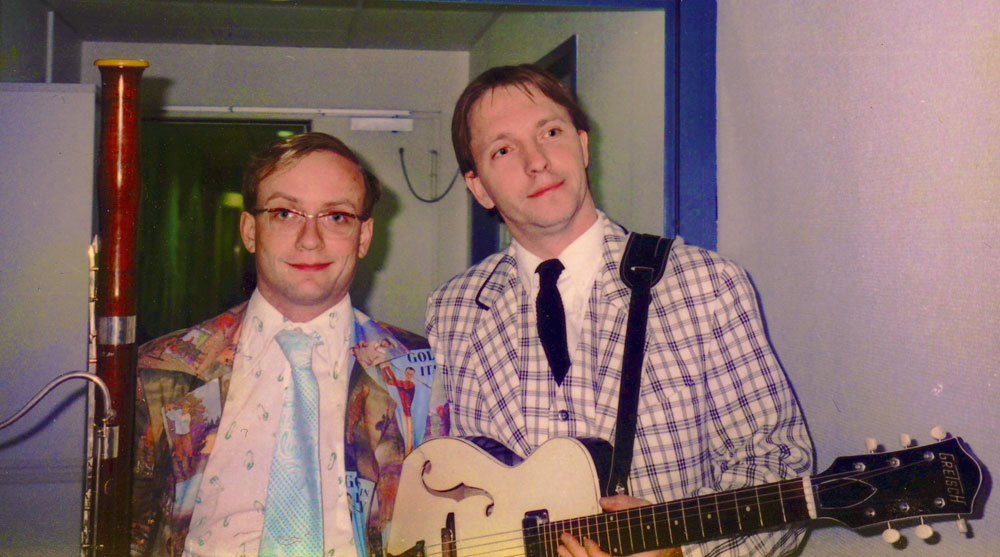
Boning (left) with Olli Dittrich as Die Doofen in 1996

- 1995: Goldene Stimmgabel
- 1995: Bambi Award
- 1995: ECHO
- 1995: Goldene Europa
- 1995: Comet Award

=== Personal ===
- 2004: Adolf-Grimme-Preis for WIB-Schaukel: Wigald Boning trifft Jürgen Drews auf Mallorca
- 2005: Deutscher Fernsehpreis for Clever!
