= Noelani =

Noelani is a Hawaiian female given name, meaning "heavenly mist". People with the given name Noelani include:

- Noelani Arista, Hawaiian and American historian
- Noelani Goodyear-Ka'opua, Kanaka Maoli scholar and educator
- Noelani Pantastico (born 1980) is a Hawaiian-born ballet dancer
