= RTL Samstag Nacht =

German comedy TV show

- Starring: Wigald Boning (1993–1998); Esther Schweins (1993–1998); Olli Dittrich (1993–1998); Stefan Jürgens (1993–1998); Tanja Schumann (1993–1998); Mirco Nontschew (1993–1998); Sabine Aulmann (1993); Tommy Krappweis (1995–1998); Marc Weigel (1997–1998)
- Country of origin: Germany
- Original language: German

Production
- Executive producers: Hugo Egon Balder; Jacky Dreksler
- Production companies: Pacific Productions; RTL; Atlantic Media

Original release
- Network: RTL
- Release: 6 November 1993 – 23 May 1998

RTL Samstag Nacht is a comedy television show which ran from 6 November 1993 to 23 May 1998 on German TV network RTL. It was a major comedy show on German television, created after the example of the long-running American show Saturday Night Live and broadcast late on Saturday night. It helped several new comedians in Germany to break through and was a model for several later comedy shows.

Karl Ranseier was a recurring character featured in fake news reports, mentioning his death at the end of each episode. The name Karl Ranseier has become a catchphrase in Germany that has led to its own joke category of Ranseiers which became popular outside of the comedy origin.

The show was relaunched in 2005 as the RTL Comedy Nacht.
