= Bärbel Mohr =

German author (1964–2010)

- Born: July 5, 1964
- Died: October 29, 2010 (aged 46)
- Spouse: Manfred
- Children: 2
- Website: www.baerbelmohr.de

Bärbel Mohr (5 July 1964 – 29 October 2010) was a German author. From 1998, she published 20 German books (self-help books, children books, stories) – including the best-selling Bestellungen beim Universum (The Cosmic Ordering Service), translated into 14 languages so far and a German audio edition – which combined have more than 1.5 million copies in print.

== Biography ==
Bärbel Mohr was born 5 July 1964. In 1995, she wrote The Cosmic Ordering Service for a small group of people and distributed it as a Xerox copy. In 2006, the British television presenter Noel Edmonds credited her book with turning his life and career around. Mohr regularly gave lectures and workshops on joyful living and how to realise your dreams.

She lived near Munich with her family (husband and twins). She died there in 2010, aged 46.

== Works ==
- The Cosmic Ordering Service, Hodder Mobius, 2006. ISBN 978-0-340-93332-9
- Cosmic Ordering for Beginners, Hay House. ISBN 978-1-4019-1551-3
- Cosmic Ordering: The Next Adventure, Hodder Mobius, 2007. ISBN 978-0-340-93333-6
- The Cosmic Ordering Wish Book, Hay House, 2008. ISBN 978-1-4019-1583-4
- Instant Cosmic Ordering, Hay House, 2008. ISBN 978-1-4019-1599-5
- COSMIC ORDERING: Complaints to the Universe (ISBN 9780340933343 - publishing April 8)
- "The Miracle of Self-Love: The Secret Key to Open All Doors", Hay House, 2012, ISBN 1781800545

== See also ==
- Napoleon Hill
- Reverend Ike
- Kenneth Copeland
- Bob Tilton
- Jim Bakker
