= Lore Lorentz =

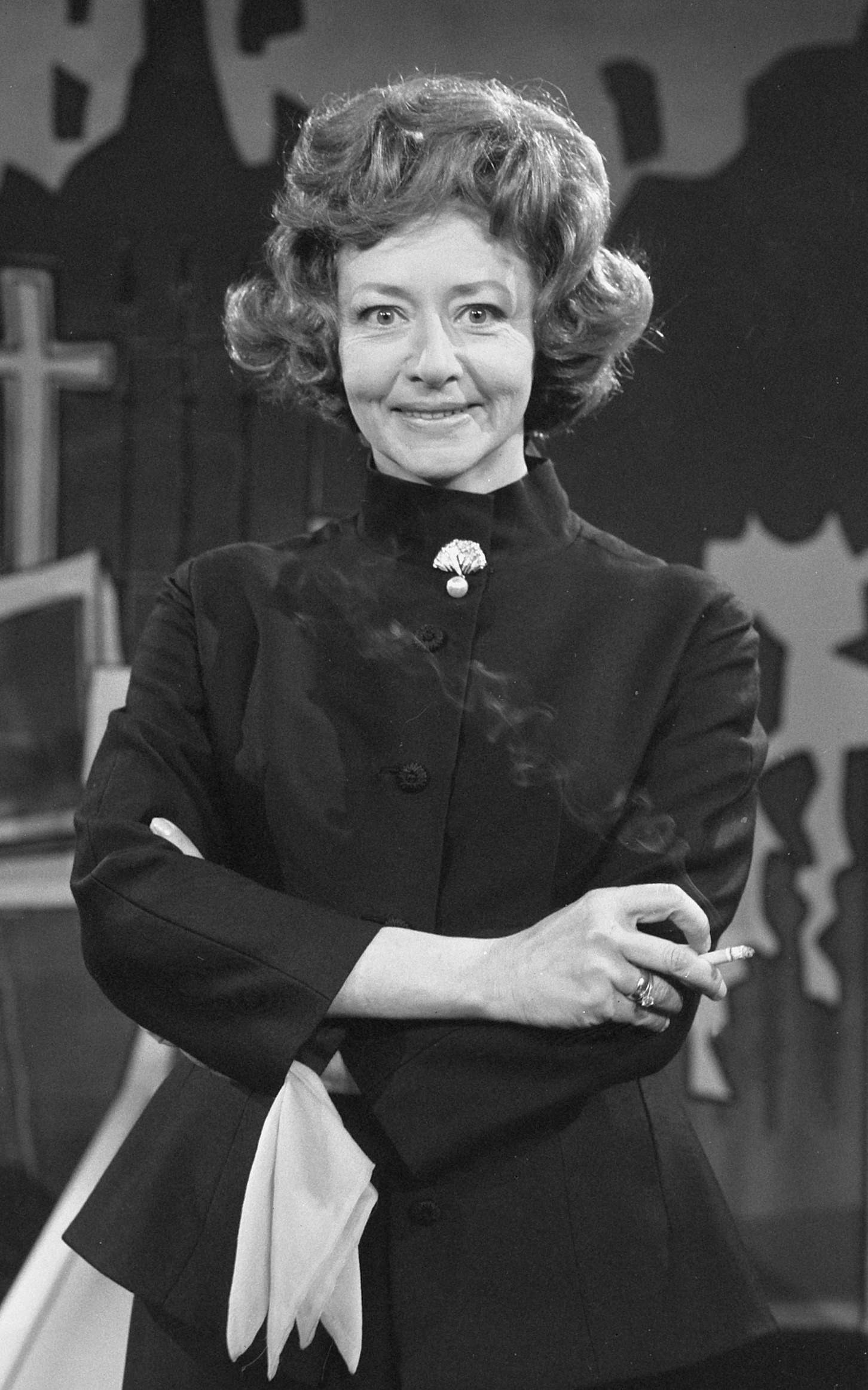
Lore Lorentz in 1966

Lore Lorentz (12 September 1920 – 22 February 1994) was a German Kabarett artist and standup comedian.

She was born in Mährisch-Ostrau, Czechoslovakia (today Ostrava in the Czech Republic), as Lore Schirmer. She studied history, German literature and philosophy in Berlin and Vienna. In Berlin, she met Kay Lorentz, who became her husband in 1944. Together, they founded the Kabarett Kom(m)ödchen in Düsseldorf in 1947. It was one of the first political cabarets in Allied-occupied Germany after the Second World War. Until 1983, Lore and Kay Lorentz were directors of the Kommödchen and part of the ensemble.

Starting in 1976, she taught chanson, song, and musicals at Folkwang Hochschule.

In 1983, she started with solo programs. One of her most famous programs consisted exclusively of texts written by Heinrich Heine; even though he had written them more than a century before Lorentz' program was performed, they all referred to current topics.

She received several prizes:

- 1981: Honorary Deutscher Kleinkunstpreis
- 1986: Staatspreis des Landes Nordrhein-Westfalen
- 1989: Großer Kulturpreis der Sparkassen-Kulturstiftung Rheinland
- 1989: Honorary Recognition by the Heinrich-Heine-Gesellschaft (jointly with her husband)
- 2004: Start on the Walk of Fame of Cabaret (posthumous)

Kay and Lore Lorentz rejected the Bundesverdienstkreuz (Federal Cross of Merit) in 1976. A secondary school in Düsseldorf is named in her honour.

She died in 1994 in Düsseldorf of pneumonia.

On audio CD:

- Denk ich an Deutschland (A cabaret evening with texts of Heinrich Heine). CD. ISBN 3-931265-00-5
- Chansons. CD. ISBN 3-931265-01-3
- Frivolitäten – 10 Diseusen – 10 Chansons. LP. Polydor J 73 555
