= Franz Jarnach =

German actor and musician

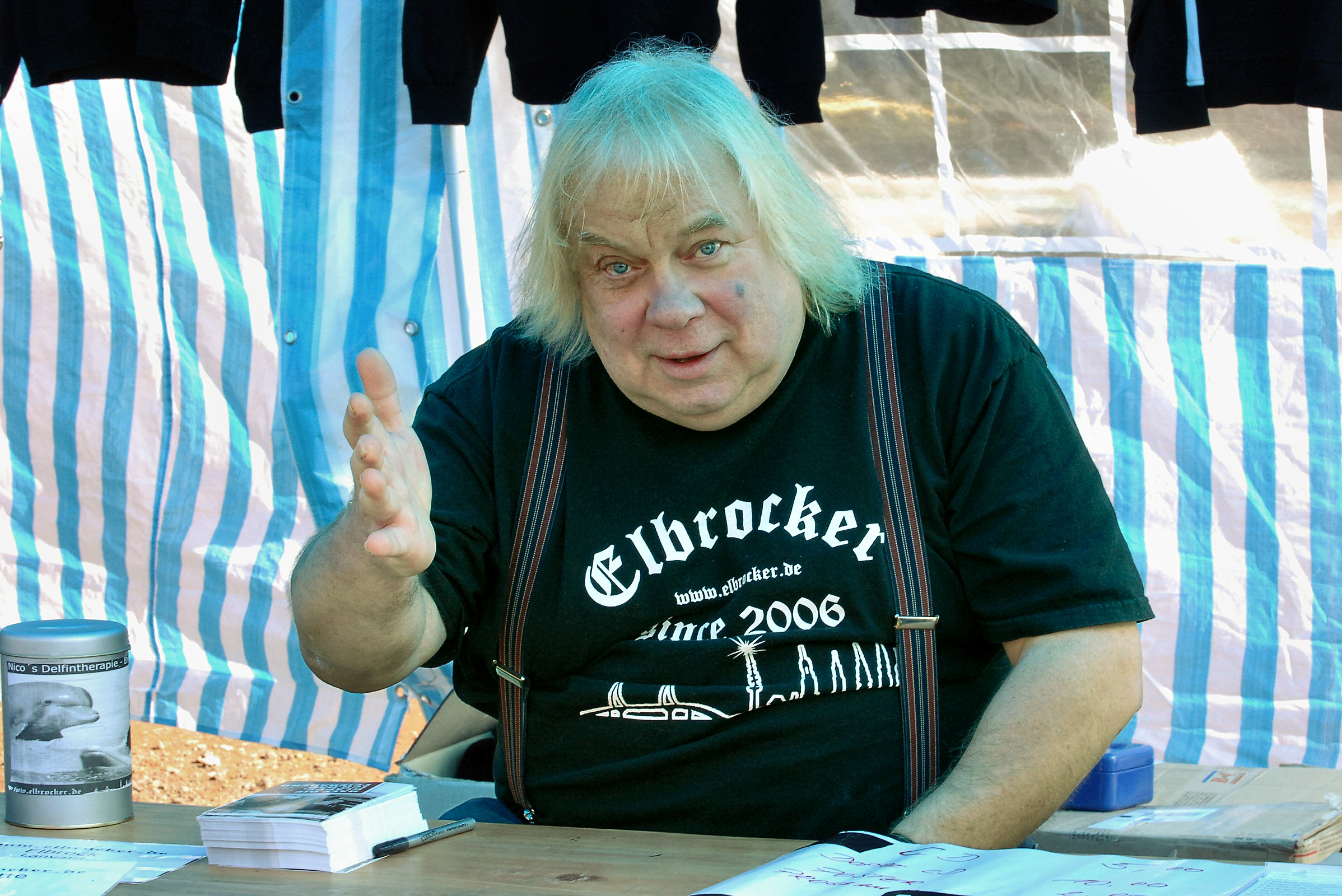
- Jarnach in October 2007
- Born: 14 October 1943; Bad Godesberg, Rhine Province, Free State of Prussia, Greater German Reich (now Bonn, North Rhine-Westphalia, Germany)
- Died: 16 January 2017 (aged 73); Hamburg, Germany
- Other names: Mr. Piggi
- Occupations: Actor, musician
- Years active: 1960s–2017
- Known for: Schildkröte in Dittsche
- Father: Philipp Jarnach

Franz Jarnach (14 October 1943 – 16 January 2017), also known by his stage name Mr. Piggi, was a German actor and musician. He was best known for his role as Schildkröte in the improvisation comedy series Dittsche. He appeared in the series 217 times between 2004 and 2016. He was a pianist for the 1960s British beat group Lee Curtis and the All-Stars. He appeared on the music program Beat-Club with the group twice. He was also a member of the rock band The Rattles during the early 1990s.

Jarnach was born in Bad Godesberg, today a district of Bonn, North Rhine-Westphalia. His father, Philipp Jarnach (1892–1982), was a noted composer.

Jarnach died from a heart attack on 16 January 2017 in Hamburg. He was 73.
