= Lubach =

Lubach may refer to:

- Arjen Lubach, a Dutch comedian, author, music producer and television presenter
- Zondag met Lubach, a Dutch weekly satirical television programme that aired between 2014 and 2022, presented by Arjen Lubach
- Lubach (TV program), a Dutch satirical news and talk television program which premiered in 2025, presented by Arjen Lubach
