= Zurich Film Festival =

Annual film festival in Switzerland

- Location: Zürich, Switzerland
- Founded: 2005; 21 years ago
- Founded by: Karl Spoerri; Nadja Schildknecht
- Most recent: 2025
- Awards: Golden Eye
- Hosted by: Zurich Film Festival AG; Spoundation Motion Picture AG
- Artistic director: Christian Jungen
- No. of films: 107 films
- Festival date: 24 September to 4 October 2026
- Website: zff.com/en/home/

Zurich Film Festival chronology
- 21st 20th

Zurich Film Festival (ZFF) is an annual film festival that has been held in Zürich, Switzerland, since 2005. The festival's main focus is to promote emerging filmmakers from all over the world. In three competition categories only first, second, or third directorial works are admitted. There are three competition sections: International Feature Film, International Documentary Film, and Focus: Switzerland, Germany, and Austria, which focuses on these three production countries. Several industry events take place in the framework of the festival. As of 2025 the festival director is Christian Jungen.

== History ==
Nadja Schildknecht, Karl Spoerri and Antoine Monot Jr. founded the festival in 2004. Until 2020 the festival was co-directed by Nadja Schildknecht (managing director) and Karl Spoerri (artistic director).

In 2004, Karl Spoerri and Tim Geser decided to bring the English digital film festival onedotzero_adventures in moving images to Zürich. From 29 to 31 October 2004, the festival was a guest at the Hochschule für Gestaltung und Kunst in Zürich. This small event developed into the Zurich Film Festival and its core team. In spring 2005, Karl Spoerri, Nadja Schildknecht and Antoine Monot, Jr. founded Spoundation Motion Picture GmbH, which has been running the Zurich Film Festival ever since and is headed by Karl Spoerri and Nadja Schildknecht. Antoine Monot, Jr. was artistic director from its inception until 2008, before handing over this role to Karl Spoerri.

The 1st Zurich Film Festival (5 to 9 October 2005) was held in the Plaza cinemas in Zürich. The main focus was on debuts - around eight first films were presented in a competition series. Other film series were called "Debut Classics" and "Züri Bellevue", among others. In its first year, the festival was well received by the public and attracted 8,000 visitors, but the press and the industry were still sceptical about the young festival. The "onedotzero_ch" series was part of the ZFF every year until 2011.

In 2006, the 2nd Zurich Film Festival (2 to 6 October 2006) the Golden Eye awards were awarded in three competition categories (Best Newcomer Feature Film, Best Newcomer Documentary Film, and Debut Feature Film). New programme sections included "New World View".

The young Zurich Film Festival took a big leap in 2007 when it was held for the first time over the length of 11 days. Over 50 world, European or Swiss premieres were presented on the "Film Mile" along the Limmat. The number of spectators rose to 27,000 within three years. For the first time, the Zurich Film Festival had a centre in the heart of the city: a large tent on Rathausplatz became the meeting place for cinema enthusiasts and filmmakers. In 2007, the festival was expanded to include the Zurich Coproduction Forum.

From 2008 to 2012, the Zurich Film Festival continued to develop and the number of visitors doubled again.

In 2009, the Zurich Film Festival was overshadowed and at the same time made world famous after guest of honour Roman Polański was arrested upon entering Switzerland and placed under house arrest for nine months. In 2011 he returned to the Zurich Film Festival to collect his honorary award two years late.

In 2011 a new festival centre was established on the Sechseläutenplatz. The Zürich Opera House has also been established as the venue for the award night. In 2011, the ZFF offered school screenings for the first time. In 2012, the ZFF included two films especially for children aged 6 and over and two films for primary school pupils in its programme for the first time.

Since August 2016, the NZZ media group has held a stake in Zurich Film Festival AG, the organiser of the Zurich Film Festival, and in the marketing organisation Spoundation Motion Picture AG.

For the 20th anniversary edition in 2024, the ZFF set a new record, with 140,000 visitors attending the festival, which featured a total of 107 films.

== Governance and description ==
As of 2025 the festival director is Christian Jungen.

Mehmet Inan became Managing Director of Spoundation Motion Picture AG in March 2026. In this position, he works on the ZFF leadership team and oversees marketing, partnerships, and guest services.

== Programme sections ==
=== Competition ===
In the competition, only first, second and third directorial works are presented in three categories (10-14 films each):

- Focus Competition (Switzerland, Germany, Austria)
- Feature Film Competition
- Documentary Competition

=== Film selections out of competition ===
==== Gala Premieres ====
In the "Gala Premieres" section, film premieres by established filmmakers are celebrated every evening, mostly in the presence of the director and cast, with both feature film and larger documentary productions being shown. The films are presented as world, European, German-language, or Swiss premieres.

==== Special Screenings ====
In the "Special Screenings" series, the Zurich Film Festival shows a selection of festival hits and brand-new films from the fields of fiction and documentary.

==== Hashtag ====
The "Hashtag" section is dedicated to films that focus on current topics and themes that dominate conversations around the world. Various feature and documentary Films that shine a light on the issue from different angles are presented. So far, the focus has been on the following topics: #SaveDemocracy (2025), #BigCityLife (2024), #Masculinity (2023), #MyReligion (2022),#letSEXplore (2021), #GetUpStandUp (2020), #SpeakingTheTruth (2019), #BigData (2018)

==== New World View ====
The "New World View" program puts a spotlight on a new generation of filmmakers from a selected production country that has provided some of the most innovative new filmmaking in recent years. The section has been dedicated to the following countries: Korea (2023), Spain (2022), Tunisia (2021), France (2020), Colombia (2019), Italy (2018), Hungary (2017), Mexico (2016), Iran (2015), India (2014), Brazil (2013), Sweden (2012), Turkey (2011), Australia (2010), Argentina (2009), Israel (2008), Russia (2007).

==== Border Lines ====
The "Border Lines" section presents films dealing with border situations occurring in present-day world conditions, and humanitarian projects, territorial and social conflicts, and conflicts between individuals and the state. It is organized in collaboration with Amnesty International, Human Rights Partner of ZFF.

==== Window ====
The "Window" section comprises windows through which one can take a look at various cinematographic traditions. The "Hong Kong Window" presents a selection of unique and daring new films from Hong Kong ans is presented in collaboration with the Hong Kong Economic and Trade Office, Berlin. The "San Sebastián Window" presents a selection of four films from Spain and Latin America that were screened as part of the San Sebastián Film Festival.

==== Sounds ====
The "Sounds" section celebrates the relationship between film and music in all its diverse aspects. With a diverse selection of feature and documentary films, the soundtrack takes center stage - whether the film shines its light on musicians, captivates with exceptional film music, or deals with the topic of sound in a very fundamental way. The program is complemented by two special screenings: One accompanied by live music and one with a live commentary by the film composer.

==== ZFF for Kids ====
At the 9th Zurich Film Festival, the children's programme was expanded with a separate audience award. The aim of the film series is to introduce children and young people to sophisticated film culture beyond the mainstream and to strengthen their media competence in a world dominated by images. Since 2020, there has been a year-round ZFF for Kids programme consisting of workshops and cinema screenings.

==== ZFF Series ====
At the 10th Zurich Film Festival in 2014, a section was introduced in which TV series are shown. Until the 13th edition, this was called "ZFF TVision" and was renamed "ZFF Series" in 2018. With the renaming, a separate small competition was started, which was held until 2020. Since 2022 series are no longer shown in a separate section.

== Guest of honour and Lifetime Achievement Awards ==
=== A Tribute to... ===
The A Tribute to... Award (formerly Retrospektive) honours filmmaking personalities who have had a significant influence on film history. The award winners receive the prize in person in Zürich and usually take part as speakers at the ZFF Masters, where they share their experiences and knowledge with the participants.

Year	Name	Award	Ref
2026	Martin McDonagh		
2025	Noah Baumbach	A Tribute to... Award	
2024	Edward Berger	A Tribute to... Award	
2023	Todd Haynes	A Tribute to... Award	
2022	Luca Guadagnino	A Tribute to... Award	
2021	Paolo Sorrentino	A Tribute to... Award	
2020	Maïwenn	A Tribute to... Award	
2019	Roland Emmerich	A Tribute to... Award	
2018	Wim Wenders	A Tribute to... Award	
2017	Rob Reiner	A Tribute to... Award	
2016	Olivier Assayas	A Tribute to... Award	
2015	Mike Leigh	A Tribute to... Award	
2014	Claire Denis	A Tribute to... Award	
2013	Michael Haneke	A Tribute to... Award	
2012	Tom Tykwer	A Tribute to... Award	
2011	Paul Haggis	A Tribute to... Award	
2010	Miloš Forman	A Tribute to... Award	
2009	Roman Polański	A Tribute to... Award	
2008	Costa-Gavras	A Tribute to... Award	
2007	Oliver Stone	A Tribute to... Award	
2006	Stephen Frears	A Tribute to... Award	
2005	Rainer Werner Fassbinder	Retrospektive	

=== Golden Icon Award ===
In 2008, the Golden Icon Award was presented for the first time. It's an award that honours the lifetime achievement of an actor or actress. This award goes to a person who has become the icon of an entire generation and whose performance and cinematic work has become unforgettable. Previous award winners include:

Year	Name
2026	Julianne Moore
2025	Colin Farrell
2024	Kate Winslet
2023	Jessica Chastain
2022	Sir Ben Kingsley
2021	Sharon Stone
2020	Juliette Binoche
2019	Cate Blanchett
2018	Judi Dench
2017	Glenn Close
2016	Hugh Grant
2015	Arnold Schwarzenegger
2014	Diane Keaton
2013	Hugh Jackman
2012	Richard Gere
2011	Sean Penn
2010	Michael Douglas
2009	Morgan Freeman
2008	Sylvester Stallone

=== Career and Lifetime Achievement Awards ===
The Career Achievement Award is presented to a personality who has distinguished himself or herself in the field of production, directing or interdisciplinarity. The award winners are honoured with a Golden Eye Award. The Lifetime Achievement Award honours the life and work of personalities from various fields who have particularly enriched and shaped filmmaking and film history.

Year	Name	Award
2026	Glen Basner	Game Changer Award
2026	Richard Linklater, Gabriel Yared, DCM	Career Achievement Award
2026	John Turturro, Tom Hiddleston, Naomi Watts, Luna Wedler, Leïla Bekhti	Golden Eye for most significant performer of his generation
2025	Russell Crowe	Lifetime Achievement Award
2025	Anne Walser	Career Achievement Award
2025	Claire Foy	Golden Eye for decades-long creative work
2024	Emil Steinberger	Lifetime Achievement Award
2024	Howard Shore	Career Achievement Award
2024	Pamela Anderson, Alicia Vikander, Jude Law	Golden Eye Award
2023	Mads Mikkelsen, Diane Kruger	Golden Eye Award
2023	Volker Bertelmann, Michel Merkt	Career Achievement Award
2022	Eddie Redmayne, Charlotte Gainsbourg	Golden Eye Award
2022	Rachel Portman	Career Achievement Award
2021	Mychael Danna	Career Achievement Award
2021	Paul Schrader	Lifetime Achievement Award
2021	Andrey Mordovsky	Golden Eye Award
2020	Iris Berben, Til Schweiger	Golden Eye Award
2020	Rolf Lyssy	Career Achievement Award
2019	Kristen Stewart	Golden Eye Award
2018	Donald Sutherland	Lifetime Achievement Award
2017	Aaron Sorkin	Career Achievement Award
2017	Andrew Garfield, Jake Gyllenhaal	Golden Eye Award
2016	Marcel Hoehn	Lifetime Achievement Award
2016	Lorenzo di Bonaventura	Career Achievement Award
2015	Armin Mueller-Stahl	Lifetime Achievement Award
2015	Steve Golin, Liam Hemsworth	Career Achievement Award, Golden Eye Award: The New A-Lister
2014	Michael Shamberg	Career Achievement Award
2014	Hans Zimmer, John Malkovich	Lifetime Achievement Award, Golden Eye Award
2013	Tim Bevan, Eric Fellner	Career Achievement Award
2013	Harrison Ford	Lifetime Achievement Award
2012	Jerry Weintraub	Career Achievement Award
2012	John Travolta, Helen Hunt	Lifetime Achievement Award, Golden Eye Award
2011	Alejandro González Iñárritu	Career Achievement Award
2010	–	–
2009	Michael Keaton	Lifetime Achievement Award

== Awards and jury ==
- Golden Eye: In each category, a separate, internationally composed jury awards a Golden Eye for the best film. The prize is worth CHF 25,000 (international feature and documentary film competition) or CHF 20,000 (focus). In addition, the winning films will receive promotional measures for distribution in Switzerland.
- Emerging Swiss Talent Award: All Swiss productions (1st, 2nd or 3rd feature film by the director) screening at the festival are nominated. The prize is endowed with CHF 10,000.
- Audience Award: The audience chooses their favorite film from all the competition entries by ballot and online voting, which is awarded the Audience Award at the Award Night.

=== Jury members ===
The Golden Eyes are awarded by an international competition jury, which views the films together with the audience during the festival in Zurich. The jury is not bound by any special guidelines in awarding the prizes, but only one film per category can be awarded a Golden Eye.

Year	Competition	President	Jury
2023	Feature Film	Anton Corbijn	Finola Dwyer, Laure de Clermont-Tonnerre, Juho Kuosmanen, Bryce Nielsen
2023	Documentary	Feras Fayyad	Monica Lazurean-Gorgan, Claudio Cea, Crystal Moselle, Shaunak Sen
2023	Focus Switzerland, Germany, Austria	Malte Grunert	Gabrielle Tana, Katrin Renz, Heike Parplies, Sven Schelker
2022	Feature Film	Asghar Farhadi	Clio Barnard, Daniel Dreifuss, Petra Volpe, Piodor Gustafsson
2022	Documentary	Alexander Nanau	Atanas Georgiev, Joëlle Bertossa, Nina Numankadić, Sushmit Ghosh
2022	Focus Switzerland, Germany, Austria	Christine Vachon	Fred Baillif, Katharina Mückstein, Maria Fantastica Valmori, Roger Schawinski
2021	Feature Film	Daniel Brühl	Stéphanie Chuat, Dieter Kosslick, Andrea Cornwell
2021	Documentary	Asif Kapadia	Hanka Kastelicová, Gregory Kershaw, Sophie Maintigneux, Michela Pini
2021	Focus Switzerland, Germany, Austria	Sönke Wortmann	Caterina Mona, Pierre Monnard, Sandra Guldberg Kampp, Ada Solomon
2020	Feature Film	Michel Franco	Karim Aïnouz, Ellen Harrington
2020	Documentary	Vitaly Mansky	Gabriela Bussmann, Susanne Regina Meures
2020	Focus Switzerland, Germany, Austria	Angelina Maccarone	Edna Epelbaum, Sabine Moser, Francesco Rizzi, Dan Wechsler
2019	Feature Film	Oliver Stone	Laura Bispuri, Ciro Guerra, Sebastian Koch, Tiziana Soudani
2019	Documentary	Simon Chinn	Christian Frei, Maryam Goormaghtigh, Anja Kofmel, Stephen Nemeth
2019	Focus Switzerland, Germany, Austria	Thomas Kufus	Natascha Beller, Benjamin Herrmann, Marie Kreutzer, Aline Schmid
2018	Feature Film	Gabrielle Tana	Ana Lily Amirpour, Ann Hui, Max Irons
2018	Documentary	Dick Fontaine	Talal Derki, Camilla Nielsson, Maya Zinshtein
2018	Focus Switzerland, Germany, Austria	Barbara Albert	Max Karli, Wolfgang Thaler, Markus Welter
2017	Feature Film	Trine Dyrholm	Mabel Cheung, Ed Guiney, Michel Merkt, Paul Negoescu, Lucas Ochoa
2017	Documentary	Simon Kilmurry	Gabór Hörcher, Hanna Polak, Patrik Soergel
2017	Focus Switzerland, Germany, Austria	Quirin Berg	Anne Fabini, Burhan Qurbani, Anne Walser
2016	Feature Film	Lone Scherfig	Graham Broadbent, David Farr, Sibel Kekilli
2016	Documentary	Mike Lerner	Betzabé García, Firouzeh Khosrovani, Stéphane Kuthy, Nadav Schirman
2016	Focus Switzerland, Germany, Austria	Bettina Reitz	Joel Basman, Nathalie Borgers, Micha Lewinsky, Devid Striesow
2015	Feature Film	Elizabeth Karlsen	Rosa Attab, Yann Demange, Maria Furtwängler, Katja von Garnier
2015	Documentary	Catherine Dussart	Abbas Fahdel, Alexander Nanau, Havana Marking, Joelle Alexis
2015	Focus Switzerland, Germany, Austria	Nico Hofmann	Nick Brandestini, Anika Decker, Alexander Fehling, Birgit Minichmayr
2014	Feature Film	Susanne Bier	Donald De Line, Marie Masmonteil, Jasmila Zbanic
2014	Documentary	Steve James	Nick Broomfield, Greg Gorman, Nishtha Jain
2014	Focus Switzerland, Germany, Austria	Stefan Arndt	Iris Berben, Jan-Ole Gerster, Peter Reichenbach, Anna Thommen
2013	Feature Film	Marc Forster	Andrew Dominik, Thomas Imbach, Melissa Leo, Guneet Monga, Stacey Sher
2013	Documentary	Elizabeth Radshaw	Gabriel Mascaro, Ilian Metev, Eugene Panji
2013	Feature Film Switzerland, Germany, Austria	Veronica Ferres	Jochen Laube, Rolf Lyssy, Manuela Stehr
2013	Documentary Switzerland, Germany, Austria	Markus Imhoof	Tizza Covi, Sabine Gisiger
2012	Feature Film	Frank Darabont	Deborah Aquila, Daniél Espinosa, Carlos Leal, Pietro Scalia, Michael Shamberg
2012	Documentary	Jessica Yu	Mohamed Al-Daradji, Philippe Diaz, Janus Metz
2012	Feature Film Switzerland, Germany, Austria	Herbert Grönemeyer	Peter Luisi, Florian Flicker, Julia Jentsch, Marcel Hoehn
2012	Documentary Switzerland, Germany, Austria	Gabriele Kranzelbinder	Martin Hagemann, Stefan Haupt, Mirjam von Arx
2011	Feature Film	Laurence Fishburne	Beki Probst, John Lesher, Paprika Steen, Alice Eve, Stefan Arsenjevic
2011	Documentary	–	Charles Ferguson, John Battsek, Stephen Nemeth, Eline Flipse, Nino Kirtadze
2011	Feature Film Switzerland, Germany, Austria	–	Xavier Koller, Florian Keller, Pasquale Aleardi, Janine Jackowski, Florian Causen
2011	Documentary Switzerland, Germany, Austria	–	Jacqueline Zünd, Christian Beetz, Güzin Kar, Vincent Lucassen
2010	Feature Film	Frank Langella	Julia Solomonoff, Carlos Cuaron, Anatole Taubman, Sharon Swart, Barry Gifford
2010	Documentary	–	Chris Paine, Nenad Puhovski, Mark Lewis, Heidi Specogna, Jennifer Fox
2010	Feature Film Switzerland, Germany, Austria	–	Johanna Wokalek, Christoph Schaub, Christof Neracher, Jessica Hausner, Frieder Wittich
2009	Feature Film	Debra Winger	Pawel Pawlikowski, Randal Kleiser, Anahi Berneri, Dale Launer
2009	Documentary	–	Peter Liechti, Erwin Wagenhofer, Elizabeth Wood
2009	Feature Film Switzerland, Germany, Austria	–	Niki Reiser, Martin Rapold, This Brunner
2008	Feature Film	Peter Fonda	Stephen Nemeth, Dror Shaul, Hervé Schneid, Michael Dougherty, Andrea Staka
2008	Documentary	–	Walter Hügli, Lorna Tee, Christian Frei
2007	International Feature Film and Documentary	Albert S. Ruddy	Moritz Bleibtreu, Justus von Dohnanyi, Bettina Oberli, Matthew Modine, Dieter Meier
2006	International Feature Film and Documentary	Ed Pressman	Jessica Schwarz, This Brunner, Ueli Steiger, Oliver Hirschbiegel
2005	International Feature Film and Documentary	Hellmuth Karasek	Sabine Timoteo, Michael Steiner, Sigried Narjes, Shane Walter

== Award winners ==
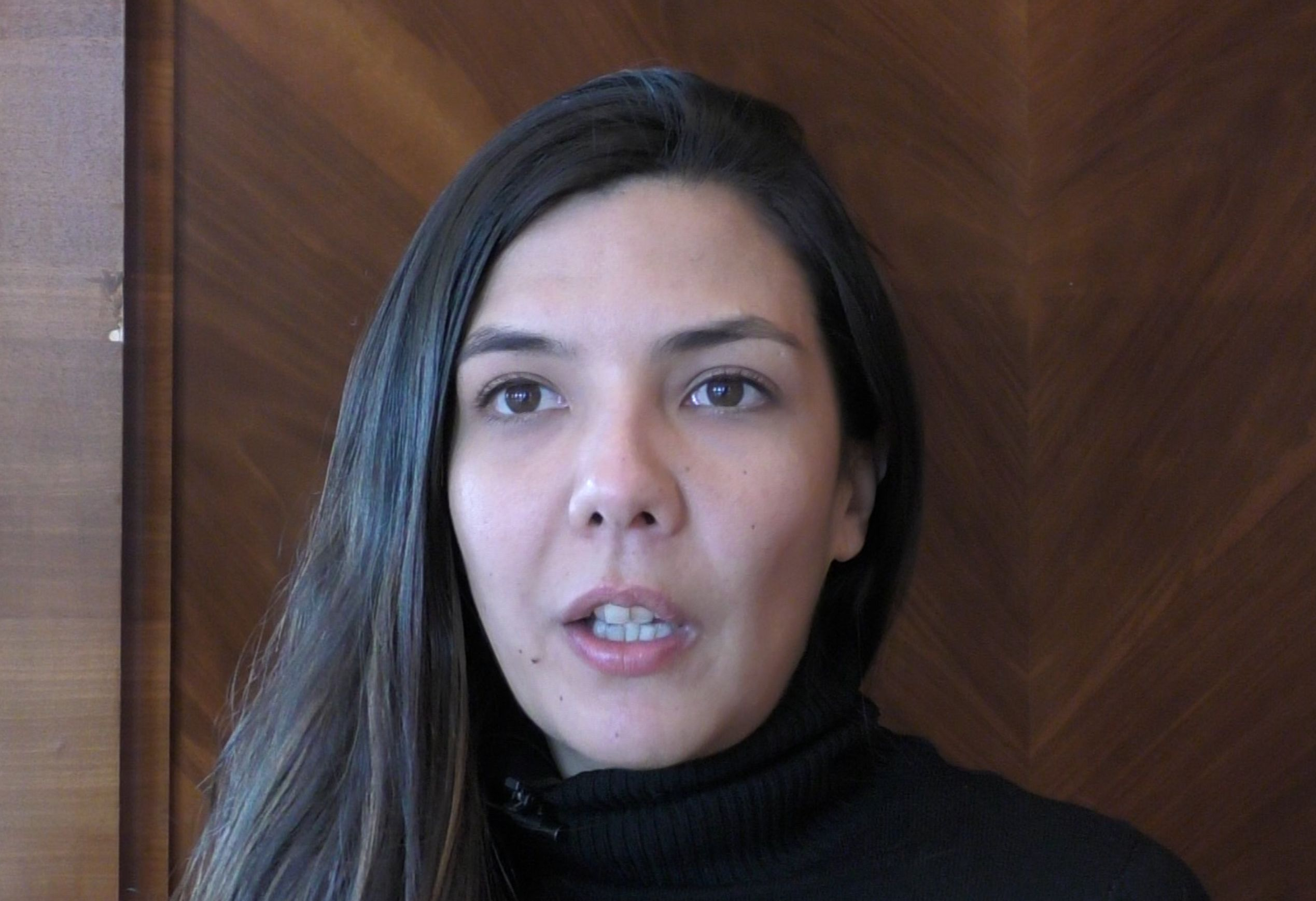
Laura Mora, director of Golden Eye winner film in 2022

The Zurich Film Festival awards the Golden Eye to the winners of the competition on the last Saturday of the event during award night at the Zürich Opera House. Further prizes are awarded by external juries.

Year	Award	Film	Director	Country
2023	Feature Film	Hesitation Wound	Tereddüt Çizgisi	Turkey, Spain, Romania, France
2023	Documentary	In the Rearview	Maciek Hamela	Poland, France, Ukraine
2023	Focus Switzerland, Germany, Austria	Hollywoodgate	Ibrahim Nash’at	Germany, USA
2023	Audience Award	Queendom	Agniia Galdanova	USA, France
2023	Best International Film Music		Elliot Murphy	Ireland
2023	Award of the Kids Jury	Dancing Queen	Aurora Gossé	Norway
2023	Audience Award ZFF for Kids	Checker Tobi und die Reise zu den fliegenden Flüssen	Johannes Honsell	Germany
2023	Critics' Award and und Filmpreis der Zürcher Kirchen	Las Toreras	Jackie Brutsche	Switzerland
2022	Feature Film	The Kings of the World, (Los reyes del mundo)	Laura Mora	Colombia, Spain, Norway, Luxembourg, Mexico, France
2022	Documentary	Sam Now	Reed Harkness	USA
2022	Focus Switzerland, Germany, Austria	Cascadeuses (Stuntwomen)	Elena Avdija	Switzerland, France
2022	Audience Award	Becoming Giulia	Laura Kaehr	Switzerland
2022	Best International Film Music	Robert IJserinkhuijsen		Netherlands
2022	Science Film Award	The Territory	Alex Pritz	Brazil, Denmark, USA
2022	Award of the Kids Jury	Lucy ist jetzt Gangster	Till Endemann	Germany, Netherlands
2022	Audience Award ZFF for Kids	My Robot Brother	Frederik Meldal Nørgaard	Denmark
2022	Critics' Award and und Filmpreis der Zürcher Kirchen	Foudre (Thunder)	Carmen Jaquier	Switzerland
2021	Feature Film	A Chiara	Jonas Carpignano	Italy
2021	Documentary	Life of Ivanna (Zhizn Ivanny)	Renato Borrao Serrano	Russia
2021	Focus Switzerland, Germany, Austria	La Mif (The Fam)	Fred Baillif	Switzerland
2021	Audience Award	Youth Topia	Dennis Stormer	Switzerland, Germany
2021	Best international TV series			
2021	Critics' Award	Azor	Andreas Fontana	Switzerland, France, Argentina
2021	Science Film Award	All Light, Everywhere	Theo Anthony	USA
2021	Award of the Kids Jury	Le Loup et le Lion (The Wolf and the Lion)	Gilles de Maistre	France, Canada
2021	Audience Award ZFF for Kids			
2021	Filmpreis der Zürcher Kirchen	La Mif (The Fam)	Fred Baillif	Switzerland
2020	Feature Film	Sin señas particulares / Was geschah mit Bus 670?	Fernanda Valadez	Mexico, Spain
2020	Documentary	Time	Garrett Bradley	USA
2020	Focus Switzerland, Germany, Austria	Hochwald	Evi Romen	Austria
2020	Audience Award	Sami, Joe und ich	Karin Heberlein	Switzerland
2020	Best international TV series	Cry Wolf	Maja Jul Larsen	Denmark
2020	Critics' Award	80.000 Schnitzel	Hannah Schweier	Germany
2020	Science Film Award	I Am Greta	Nathan Grossman	Sweden
2020	Award of the Kids Jury	The Club of Ugly Children	Jonathan Elbers	Netherlands
2020	Audience Award ZFF for Kids	Little Crumb	Diede In't Veld	Netherlands
2020	Filmpreis der Zürcher Kirchen	Sami, Joe und ich	Karin Heberlein	Switzerland
2020	Treatment Award	Fleisch und Blut	Ares Ceylan	
2019	Feature Film	Sound of Metal	Darius Marder	USA
2019	Documentary	Collective / Kollektiv – Korruption tötet	Alexander Nanau	Romania, Luxembourg
2019	Focus Switzerland, Germany, Austria	Systemsprenger	Nora Fingscheidt	Germany
2019	Audience Award	Volunteer	Anna Thommen und Lorenz Nufer	Switzerland
2019	Best international TV series	Just for today	Nir Bergman und Ram Nehari	Israel
2019	Science Film Award	Bruno Manser – Die Stimme des Regenwaldes	Niklaus Hilber	Switzerland, Austria
2019	Award of the Kids Jury	Zu weit weg	Sarah Winkenstette	Germany
2019	Filmpreis der Zürcher Kirchen	Waren einmal Revoluzzer	Johanna Moder	Austria
2018	Feature Film	Girl	Lukas Dhont	Belgium, Netherlands
2018	Documentary	Heartbound	Janus Metz und Sine Plambech	Denmark, Sweden, Netherlands
2018	Focus Switzerland, Germany, Austria	L'Animale	Katharina Mückstein	Austria
2018	Audience Award	Cold November	Ismet Sijarina	Kosovo, Albania, Mazedonia
2018	Audience Award ZFF for Kids	Raoul Taburin	Pierre Godeau	France, Belgium
2018	Critics' Award	The Guilty	Gustav Möller	Denmark
2018	Award of the Kids Jury	Los Bando	Christian Lo	Norway, Sweden
2018	Treatment Competition	C.O.D.A. – Child Of Deaf Adults	Maurizius Staerkle Drux und Lenz Baumann	Switzerland
2018	Schweizer Förderpreis	Walden	Daniel Zimmermann	Switzerland
2017	Feature Film	Pop Aye	Kirsten Tan	Singapore
2017	Documentary	Machines	Rahul Jain	India
2017	Focus Switzerland, Germany, Austria	Blue My Mind	Lisa Brühlmann	Switzerland
2017	Audience Award	A River Below	Mark Grieco	USA/Colombia
2017	Audience Award ZFF for Kids	Die Häschenschule: Jagd nach dem goldenen Ei	Ute von Münchow-Pohl	Germany
2017	Critics' Award	Blue My Mind	Lisa Brühlmann	Switzerland
2017	Award of the Kids Jury	Upp i det blå/Up in the Sky	Petter Lennstrand	Sweden
2017	Treatment Competition	Secondo	Seraina Nyikos	Switzerland
2017	Schweizer Förderpreis	Avant la fin de l’été	Maryam Goormaghtigh	Switzerland
2017	Filmpreis der Zürcher Kirchen	Blue My Mind	Lisa Brühlmann	Switzerland
2016	Feature Film	Hymyilevä mies / The Happiest Day In The Life Of Olli Mäki	Juho Kuosmanen	Finland
2016	Documentary	Madame B, histoire d’une Nord-Coréenne	Jero Yun	France, South Korea
2016	Focus Switzerland, Germany, Austria	Hidden Reserves	Valentin Hitz	Austria
2016	Audience Award	When Two Worlds Collide	Heidi Brandenburg und Mathew Orzel	Peru
2016	Audience Award ZFF for Kids	Geheimcode M.	Dennis Bots	Netherlands
2016	Critics' Award	Lady Macbeth	William Oldroyd	UK
2016	Award of the Kids Jury	Ma vie de courgette	Claude Barras	Switzerland
2016	Treatment Competition	Cold Turkey for Emergencies	Anna Schwingenschuh	Switzerland
2016	Schweizer Förderpreis	Europe, She Loves	Jan Gassmann	Switzerland
2015	Feature Film	Hrútar	Grímur Hákonarson	Island
2015	Documentary	Los reyes del pueblo que no existe	Betzabé García	Mexico
2015	Focus Switzerland, Germany, Austria	Thank You for Bombing	Barbara Eder	Austria
2015	Audience Award	Amateur Teens	Niklaus Hilber	Switzerland
2015	Audience Award ZFF for Kids	Supilinna Salaselts	Margus Paju	Estonia
2015	Critics' Award	Pikadero	Ben Sharrock	Spain, UK
2015	Treatment Competition	Renatas Erwachen	Stefanie Klemm	Switzerland
2014	Feature Film	Una noche sin luna	Germán Tejeira	Uruguay
2014	Documentary	Toto and his sisters	Alexander Nanau	Romania
2014	Focus Switzerland, Germany, Austria	Children of the Arctic	Nick Brandestini	Switzerland
2014	Audience Award	Zu Ende Leben	Rebecca Panian	Switzerland
2014	Audience Award ZFF for Kids	Fiddlesticks	Veit Helmer	Germany
2014	Critics' Award	Svenskjävel	Ronnie Sandahl	Schweden
2014	Treatment Competition	Änneli	Christine Wiederkehr	Switzerland
2013	Feature Film	La jaula de oro	Diego Quemada-Díez	Spain
2013	Documentary	Lej en familie A/S/	Kaspar Astrup Schroeder	Denmark
2013	Feature Film Switzerland, Germany, Austria	Finsterworld	Frauke Finsterwalder	Germany
2013	Documentary Switzerland, Germany, Austria	Neuland	Anna Thommen	Switzerland
2013	Audience Award	Journey to Jah	Noël Dernesch, Moritz Springer	Germany
2013	Audience Award ZFF for Kids	Believe	David Scheinmann	UK
2013	Critics' Award	Finsterworld	Frauke Finsterwalder	Germany
2013	Treatment Competition	Projekt Stürm – Bis ich tot bin oder frei	Dave Tucker	UK
2012	Feature Film	Broken	Rufus Norris	UK
2012	Documentary	The Imposter	Bart Layton	USA
2012	Feature Film Switzerland, Germany, Austria	Am Himmel der Tag	Pola Beck	Germany
2012	Documentary Switzerland, Germany, Austria	Der Prozess	Gerald Igor Hauzenberger	Austria
2012	Audience Award	Appassionata	Christian Labhart	Switzerland
2012	Critics' Award	El último Elvis	Armando Bo	Argentina
2011	Feature Film	Take Shelter	Jeff Nichols	USA
2011	Documentary	Buck	Cindy Meehl	USA
2011	Feature Film Switzerland, Germany, Austria	Atmen	Karl Markovics	Austria
2011	Documentary Switzerland, Germany, Austria	Darwin	Nick Brandestini	Switzerland
2011	Audience Award	Unter Wasser Atmen	Andri Hinnen, Stefan Muggli	Switzerland
2011	Critics' Award	Happy, Happy	Anne Sewitsky	Norway
2010	Feature Film	The Woman with a Broken Nose	Srdjan Koljevic	Serbia
2010	Documentary	Camp Armadillo	Janus Metz	Denmark
2010	Feature Film Switzerland, Germany, Austria	The Day I Was Not Born	Florian Cossen	Germany
2010	Audience Award	Stationspiraten	Mike Schaerer	Switzerland
2010	Variety’s New Talent Award	Adem	Hans van Nuffel	Belgium
2010	Critics' Award	Pal Adrienn	Agnes Kocsis	Hungary
2009	Feature Film	Wolfy	Vasilij Sigarev	Russia
2009	Documentary	The Sound After the Storm	Patrik Soergel, Ryan Fenson-Hood, Sven O. Hill	USA
2009	Feature Film Switzerland, Germany, Austria	66/67 – Fairplay war gestern	Carsten Ludwig, Jan-Christoph Glaser	Germany
2009	Audience Award	Ceasefire	Lancelot von Naso	Germany
2009	Variety’s New Talent Award	Amreeka	Cherien Dabis	USA, Kuwait, Canada
2009	Critics' Award	Applause	Pieter Zandvliet	Denmark
2008	First Feature Film	For a Moment, Freedom	Arash T. Riahi	Germany, Turkey
2008	Feature Film - Newcomer	Tulpan	Sergei Dworzewoi	Germany, Kazakhstan, Poland, Russia, Switzerland
2008	Documentary - Newcomer	Blind Loves	Juraj Lehotský	Slovakia
2008	Audience Award	The World is Big and Salvation Lurks Around the Corner	Stephan Komanderev	Bulgaria, Germany, Hungary
2007	First Feature Film	Chapter 27 – Die Ermordung des John Lennon	Jarrett Schaefer	USA
2007	Feature Film - Newcomer	Bikur Hatizmoret	Eran Kolirin	Israel, France
2007	Documentary - Newcomer	Running With Arnold	Dan Cox	USA
2007	Audience Award	Twelve In A Box	John McKenzie	UK
2006	First Feature Film	Omaret Yacoubian	Marwan Hamed	Egypt
2006	Feature Film - Newcomer	Shortbus	John Cameron Mitchell	USA
2006	Documentary - Newcomer	Hammer & Tickle – The Communist Joke Book	Ben Lewis	USA
2006	Audience Award	The Hip-Hop Project	Matt Ruskin, Scott K. Rosenberg	USA
2005	First Feature Film	The Italian	Andrei Kravchuk	Russia

== Industry events ==
=== Zurich Summit ===
The Zurich Summit, launched in 2014, traditionally takes place on the first weekend of the Festival at the Dolder Grand Hotel. The boutique conference brings together high-profile representatives from the German-language entertainment and film sectors with investors and the financial world. Topics include production and investment strategies, film financing and risk minimisation, distribution and European co-productions.

=== ZFF Academy ===
The ZFF Academy, founded in 2006 under the name ZFF Master Class, serves to promote and network talented directors, screenwriters and/or producers. Interested parties can apply for a place in the ZFF Academy. Around 30 invitations are issued each year. In some cases, recordings can be found on YouTube.

Speakers until the 19th ZFF (2023) included:

- Stefan Arsenijević (2011)
- John Battsek (2011)
- Moritz Bleibtreu (2007)
- Joel Brandeis (2013)
- Costa-Gavras (2008)
- Andreas Dresen (2008)
- Tan Dun (2008)
- Daniel Espinosa (2012)
- Asghar Farhadi (2012)
- Peter Fonda (2008)
- Milos Forman (2010)
- Jennifer Fox (2010)
- Stephen Frears
- Barry Gifford (2010)
- Terry Gilliam (2009)
- Alejandro González Iñárritu (2011)
- Paul Haggis (2011)
- Christopher Hampton (2013)
- Jessica Hausner (2010)
- Todd Haynes (2023)
- Jasmine Hoch (2013)
- Markus Imboden (2013)
- Janine Jackowski (2011)
- Babak Jalali (2023)
- Michael Keaton (2009)
- Ken Loach (2008)
- Michel Merkt (2023)
- Matthew Modine (2007)
- Guneet Monga (2013)
- Crystal Moselle (2023)
- Bettina Oberli (2007)
- Nenad Puhovski (2010)
- Peter Rommel (2008)
- Pietro Scalia (2012)
- Hervé Schneid (2013)
- Michael Shamberg (2012)
- Greg Shapiro (2012)
- Stacey Sher (2013)
- Sylvester Stallone (2008)
- Oliver Stone (2007)
- Dario Suter (2013)
- Tom Tykwer (2012)
- Christine Vachon (2011, 2023)
- Erwin Wagenhofer (2009)
- Jerry Weintraub (2012)
- Benh Zeitlin (2012)
- Vilmos Zsigmond (2010)

== Events ==
=== ZFF Masters ===
The ZFF Masters are moderated talks with well-known personalities (directors, screenwriters, producers and actors) from the international film industry. The audience gains an insight into their creative work and their attitude as filmmakers. The ZFF Masters are open to the public and are aimed at the film industry as well as the entire festival audience. Many interviews can be viewed afterwards on the ZFF Channel on YouTube.

Speakers until the 19th ZFF (2023) included:

- Fatih Akin (2014)
- Jean-Jacques Annaud (2015)
- Olivier Assayas (2016)
- Javier Bardem (2019)
- Tim Bevan (2013)
- Susanne Bier (2014)
- Juliette Binoche (2020)
- Glenn Close (2017)
- Frank Darabont (2012)
- Julie Delpy (2019)
- Johnny Depp (2020)
- Roland Emmerich (2019)
- Charles H. Ferguson (2011)
- Harrison Ford (2013)
- Marc Forster (2013)
- Charlotte Gainsbourg (2022)
- Costa-Gavras (2008)
- Adrian Grenier (2010)
- Luca Guadagnino (2022)
- Michael Haneke (2013)
- Woody Harrelson (2016)
- Ethan Hawke (2023)
- Todd Haynes (2015, 2021)
- Florian Henckel von Donnersmarck (2018)
- Markus Imhoof (2013)
- Ben Kingsley (2022)
- Diane Kruger (2023)
- Mike Leigh (2015)
- Rolf Lyssy (2020)
- Maïwenn (2020)
- Ewan McGregor (2016)
- Mads Mikkelsen (2023)
- Ray Parker Jr. (2020)
- Daniel Radcliffe (2016)
- Eddie Redmayne (2022)
- Rob Reiner (2017)
- Julian Schnabel (2018)
- Paul Schrader (2021)
- Til Schweiger (2022, 2020)
- Ulrich Seidl (2014)
- Andy Serkis (2017)
- Greg Shapiro (2012)
- Stacey Sher (2013)
- Paolo Sorrentino (2021)
- Michael Steiner (2023)
- Oliver Stone (2019)
- Donald Sutherland (2019, 2018)
- Margarethe von Trotta (2023)
- Alicia Vikander (2017)
- Harvey Weinstein (2013)
- Wim Wenders (2018)
- Frederick Wiseman (2014)
- Hans Zimmer (2014)

=== International Film Music Competition ===
The International Film Music Competition, first held in 2012, is an integral part of the Zurich Film Festival and is organised by the Tonhalle-Orchester Zürich in collaboration with the Forum Filmmusik. The competition is aimed at composers worldwide. The task is to compose music for a short film. The three best submissions will be premiered at a film music concert at the Zurich Film Festival. An international jury of experts awards the Golden Eye, worth CHF 10,000, for the best international film music.

=== Former events ===
Treatment Competition

In 2013, Schweizer Radio und Fernsehen (SRF) and Telepool launched a treatment competition in cooperation with the Zurich Film Festival. Authors could submit a treatment for a feature-length cinema or television film. The work had to have a strong connection to Switzerland - be it in terms of content, characters or production conditions. The prize for the treatment competition was CHF 5,000. In addition, the winner received a development contract worth up to CHF 25,000 to write a script for a long feature film for TV or cinema.

ZFF 72

ZFF 72 was an online film competition organised by the Zurich Film Festival until 2020. Participation was open to all film enthusiasts. At ZFF 72, filmmakers had 72 hours to produce a maximum 72-second clip. The Zurich Film Festival provided the theme for the clip. The choice of genre was free: everything from scenic films and documentary formats to CGI and stop-motion was permitted. The winners were the Jury Award, determined by a jury of experts, and the Viewers Award, which was determined by online voting.
