= Every Second Counts (video parodies) =

2017 video contest

A still from the original Zondag met Lubach parody video, which inspired the Neo Magazin Royale team to imitate and launch a worldwide challenge for others to create similar videos.

Every Second Counts is an Internet meme in which comedians outside of the United States were challenged to produce parody videos of U.S. President Donald Trump's 2017 inaugural address that "From this day forward, it's gonna be only America first! America first!" The first parody video was produced by Dutch comedian Arjen Lubach within two days after Trump's inaugural address. The second comedian to produce a parody video in the same format as Lubach's video, Jan Böhmermann of Germany, challenged comedians around the world to produce similar videos in the same format of introducing one's own country with a dose of self-deprecating humour and requesting to become 'second' after America.

== History ==
=== Origins ===
The first parody video, which inspired all the other parody videos, was produced by Dutch comedian Arjen Lubach's show Zondag met Lubach. Lubach's parody video, titled "The Netherlands welcomes Trump in his own words", was broadcast on 22 January 2017. In the video, Trump's speeches and actions –mostly from his election campaign– are imitated and mocked by voice actor Greg Shapiro, who gives a short description of the Netherlands using some self-mockery as well, finishing with the request that the Netherlands may come 'second' if America is to be 'first'. A semi-serious undertone is formed by fears that Trump's announced "America First" policy signifies isolationism, including withdrawing U.S. support for NATO: "If you screw NATO, you're gonna make our problems great again." The video went viral, being discussed by multiple international newsmedia and reaching over 73 million views worldwide by 3 February.

=== Challenge launched ===
Jan Böhmermann launches the challenge to produce video parodies.

On 2 February during Neo Magazin Royale, Jan Böhmermann questioned the Dutch's role as second to America, broadcasting a rival video that claimed 'Germany second' whilst making fun of the Netherlands and Germany itself as well. Then, he encouraged other satirical talkshow producers in all European countries to make similar videos parodying Trump, themselves and questioning the Netherlands' second place behind America. Production teams in at least eleven other countries committed to making their own parody videos, and by 3 February, versions for Belgium (by De Ideale Wereld), Switzerland (by Deville Late Night), Denmark (by Natholdet), Portugal (by 5 Para A Meia-Noite) and Lithuania (by Laikykitės ten) had been released; these would all be gathered on the website everysecondcounts.eu.

Shaun Streeter did the voice for the videos produced by Switzerland, Portugal, Germany, Luxembourg, and Denmark.

=== Beyond Europe ===
By 6 February, Italy (by Casa Surace), Luxembourg (by Studio Ben), and Morocco (a non-European country, expanding the contest further) had joined the fray. On 8 February, the website of Every Second Counts changed the original layout from a virtual 360° NATO council room with national flags of all European countries plus Morocco and Namibia next to each seat, to a clickable world map divided into the continents of "Europe", "Middle East", "Africa", "Oceania", "North Asia", "South Asia", "North America" and "South America", with "North Asia" and "North America" currently being unavailable.

== Common elements ==
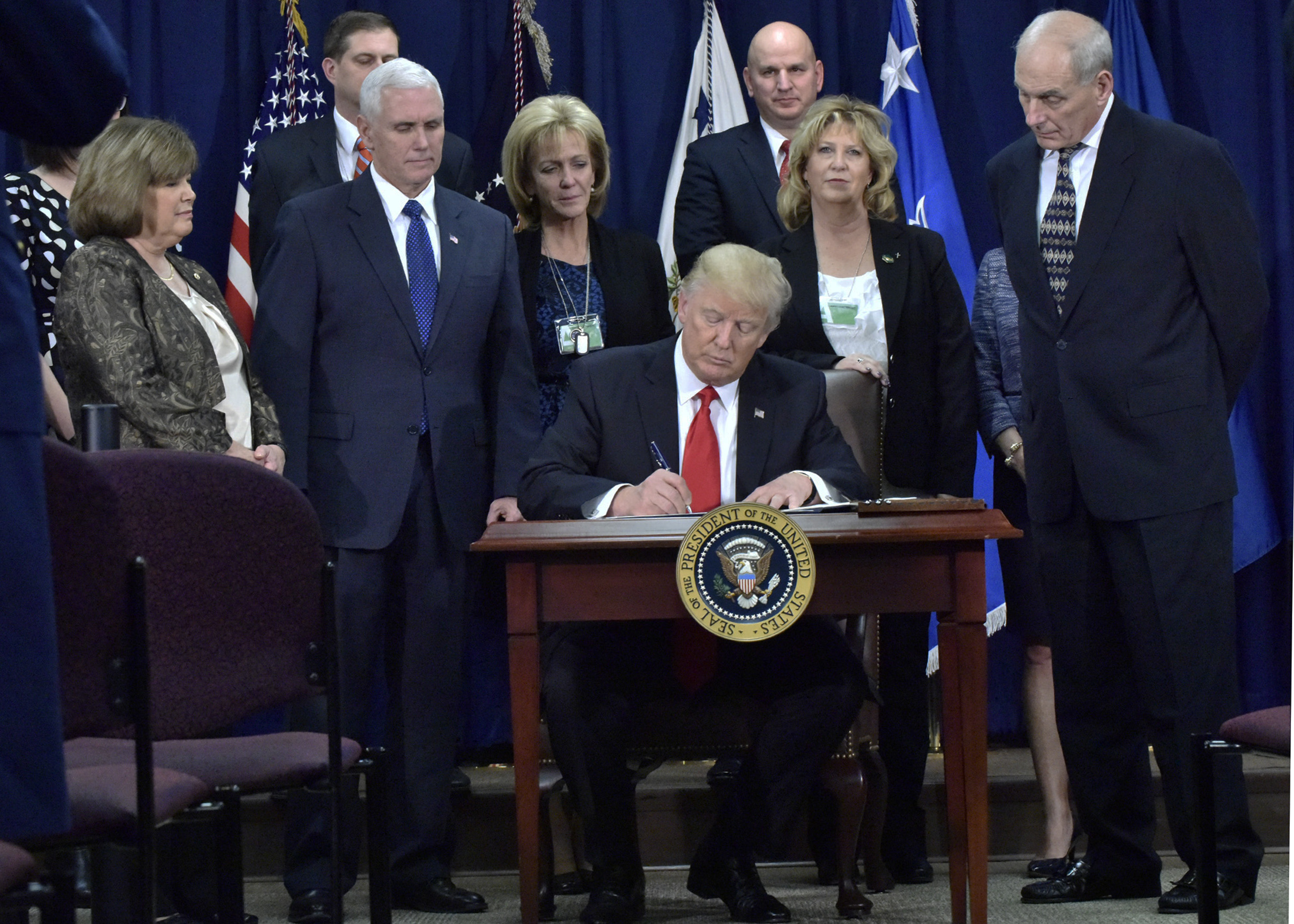
The videos make fun of Trump's plan to build a wall along the US-Mexican border.

Though widely varying in contents specific to each country's presentation, and the way in which they criticise and/or ridicule President Trump and his ideas and actions, the videos often share common elements. Many revolve around (sarcastically) taking pride in or mocking their own country's history, and comparing it to Trump's actions or American history in general, and how the latter is better, equal or worse.

- Criticism of Trump's immigration policy
  - Criticism of Trump's false electoral promise and since 25 January 2017 plan to build a wall along the U.S.–Mexican border, and make Mexico pay for it, including comparisons to countries' own "walls" such as the Afsluitdijk and the Berlin Wall
  - Criticism of Trump's electoral promise and since 27 January 2017 decree to halt immigration from several Muslim-majority countries
- Criticism of Trump's treatment of women, especially the grab them by the pussy incident
- Criticism of Trump's mockery of Serge F. Kovaleski, an investigative reporter at The New York Times with arthrogryposis.
- Criticism of Trump's apparent lack of commitment to NATO
- Criticism of Trump's alleged tax evasion
- Ridicule of Trump's appearance: his allegedly "tiny hands" and "orange" skin colour
- Mockery of Trump's use of "the best words" and the way he says "huge" (sounds like "yuge").
- Comparisons between Trump's towers and famous architectural structures within the country.
- Criticism of the Trump administration's usage of the terms "fake news" and "alternative facts"
- Joking that nobody knows where their country is located, and pointing to a different country if Trump might ever want to strike it with a nuclear attack

== Lists of videos ==
Note: EverySecondCounts.eu only lists countries

=== Countries ===
The table below lists 117 videos for 80 unique countries. At four videos, there are more videos for Algeria than for any other country listed. The website EverySecondCounts.eu features 38 of the videos, only one per country.

| Country | Date | Creator(s) | Title | Listed at EverySecondCounts.eu? | Link |
|---|---|---|---|---|---|
| Netherlands | 22 January 2017 | Zondag met Lubach | "The Netherlands welcomes Trump in his own words" | Yes | Video |
| Germany | 2 February 2017 | Neo Magazin Royale | "Germany second | NEO MAGAZIN ROYALE mit Jan Böhmermann" | Yes | Video |
| Denmark | 2 February 2017 | Natholdet | "Denmark second | Denmark Trumps The Netherlands at being no. 2" | Yes | Video |
| Portugal | 2 February 2017 | 5 Para A Meia-Noite | "Portugal Second" | Yes | Video (alternate) |
| Switzerland | 2 February 2017 | Deville Late Night | "Switzerland Second (official)" | Yes | Video |
| Belgium | 3 February 2017 | De Ideale Wereld | "America First, Belgium Second" | Yes | Video |
| Lithuania | 3 February 2017 | Laikykitės ten su Andriumi Tapinu | "Lithuania welcomes Trump" | Yes | Video |
| Luxembourg | 5 February 2017 | Studio Ben | "Luxembourg Second (Official)" | Yes | Video |
| Iran | 6 February 2017 | Amiroo | "America First ... but what about Iran? #everysecondcounts" | Yes | Video |
| Italy | 6 February 2017 | Casa Surace | "Italy Second - Reaction to Trump's America First" | Yes | Video |
| Morocco | 6 February 2017 | Marouane Lamharzi Alaoui | "Morocco Second (Official)" | Yes | Video |
| Austria | 7 February 2017 | Willkommen Österreich | "Austria Second - Willkommen Österreich" | Yes | Video |
| Bulgaria | 7 February 2017 | Gospodari Na Efira | "Bulgaria second (Official) | България втора" | Yes | Video |
| Czech Republic | 7 February 2017 | Stream.cz | "America first, Czech Republic FIFTY FIRST! (official)" | Yes | Video |
| Moldova | 7 February 2017 | Emisiunea Lumina | "AMERICA FIRST, MOLDOVA SECOND (hand)" | Yes | Video |
| Namibia | 7 February 2017 | Coolbox Cinema & EES TV | "America First /NAMIBIA FIRST (NOT SECOND) | Response to the Netherlands Trump welcome video" | Yes | Video |
| Slovenia | 7 February 2017 | Ta teden z Juretom Godlerjem | "America first... Slovenia second (OFFICIAL)" | Yes | Video |
| Australia | 8 February 2017 | The Weekly with Charlie Pickering | "The Weekly: Make Australia Second" | Yes | Video |
| New Zealand | 8 February 2017 | Jono and Ben | "America First, New Zealand Second" | Yes | Video |
| Poland | 8 February 2017 | Z Dvpy | "AMERICA FIRST, POLAND FIRSTER!" | Yes | Video |
| Croatia | 9 February 2017 | News Bar | "Croatia Second | OFFICIAL | News Bar" | Yes | Video |
| Iceland | 9 February 2017 | Nútíminn | "Iceland Second (official)" | Yes | Video |
| Finland | 9 February 2017 | Noin viikon uutiset | "America First, Finland Second (OFFICIAL)" | Yes | Video |
| Spain | 9 February 2017 | Late Motiv | "LATE MOTIV - America First, Spain Second. Official Vídeo" | Yes | Video |
| Brazil | 11 February 2017 | Tá no Ar | "America first, Brazil second!" | Yes | Video |
| Israel | 12 February 2017 | Gav Ha'Uma | "Lior Schleien - America first, Israel second" | Yes | Video |
| Armenia | 13 February 2017 | ArmComedy | "Armenia Second (Alternative First) | An Introductory Video For Donald Trump" | Yes | Video |
| Serbia | 13 February 2017 | Njuz.net | "America first, Russia also first, and Serbia first after that #everysecondcounts" | Yes | Video |
| Slovakia | 13 February 2017 | (unknown) | "America First, Slovakia Second/ Slovakia Welcomes Trump In His Own Words (Official)" | Yes | Video |
| India | 14 February 2017 | Sooperfly | "America First, India Second [Official] - Welcome President Trump" | Yes | Video |
| Malta | 15 February 2017 | Lovin Malta | "America First, Malta Second" | Yes | Video |
| Egypt | 16 February 2017 | Joe Tube | "America First | Egypt Second (OFFICIAL)" | Yes | Video |
| France | 16 February 2017 | C8 | "America first, France second (official)" | Yes | Video |
| Greece | 22 February 2017 | Radio Arvyla | "America First. GREECE SECOND! (Official)" | Yes | Video |
| Cyprus | 25 February 2017 | Cyprify Cypriots | "America First, Cyprus Second (official)" | Yes | Video |
| South Africa | 28 February 2017 | Kfm Breakfast | "America first, South Africa second -by KFM Breakfast" | Yes | Video |
| Chile | 21 March 2017 | NANO | "America First, Chile Second" | Yes | Video |
| Georgia | 23 March 2017 | iMedia HUB | "Georgia Second Official" | Yes | Video |
| Switzerland | 3 February 2017 | Hans-Martin Leopold | Switzerland First - Who Wants To Be Second? | No | Video |
| Kazakhstan | 4 February 2017 | Mr. Kapuzo | "KAZAKHSTAN SECOND (official) America First | Response to the Netherlands" | No | Video |
| Finland | 5 February 2017 | Daniel Muukkonen | America First but Finland Second! #Everysecondcounts | No | Video |
| France | 5 February 2017 | Valentin Guerin | "France welcomes Trump in his own words / America First - France Second" | No | Video |
| Australia | 6 February 2017 | friendlyjordies | America First, Australia Second/ Australia Welcomes Trump In His Own Words (Official) | No | Video |
| Bosnia and Herzegovina | 6 February 2017 | karakter.ba | America First, Bosnia Second | No | Video |
| Croatia | 6 February 2017 | Ivan Saric | "Croatia Second (official) - ŠarićMarekovićTomacProduction" | No | Video |
| Macedonia (Note: The country was subsequently renamed as "North Macedonia".) | 6 February 2017 | Danilo Trampovski | "Macedonia welcomes Trump in his own words - America first, Macedonia second" | No | Video |
| Pakistan | 6 February 2017 | Creative Shugel | "Pakistan Third, America First" | No | Video |
| Sweden | 6 February 2017 | SingingWithLyricsHD | "America First, Sweden Second | #PewdiepieSecond | Introduction video to Trump" | No | Video |
| Austria | 7 February 2017 | FOURLAUT TV | "Austria Second | OFFICIAL | fourlaut - PULS 4" | No | Video |
| Czech Republic | 7 February 2017 | 60seconds.cz | "America first - Czech version (Official)" | No | Video |
| Finland | 7 February 2017 | SinätuubaTV | FINLAND WELCOMES TRUMP - AMERICA FIRST, FINLAND SECOND! (OFFICIAL) | No | Video |
| Democratic People's Republic of Korea | 7 February 2017 | Niels Fennema | "America first, North Korea second" | No | Video |
| Spain | 7 February 2017 | Toniemcee | "SPAIN SECOND | A message for President Donald Trump" | No | Video |
| Sweden | 7 February 2017 | MovieMenno | SWEDEN Welcomes TRUMP In His Own Words - America First, Sweden Second [ OFFICIAL ] | No | Video |
| Latvia | 8 February 2017 | TRENDĪGS LATVIJĀ | "Latvia second / Latvija ielūdz Trampu" | No | Video |
| Romania | 8 February 2017 | RazvanoCojo | "America First & Romania Second | Romania welcomes Trump in his own words" | No | Video |
| Slovakia | 8 February 2017 | Fun Radio | America first, Slovakia second. | No | Video |
| Hungary | 9 February 2017 | Miksa Perényi | "America first, Hungary third?" | No | Video |
| Slovakia | 9 February 2017 | tazky tyzden | America first, Slovakia second | No | Video |
| Uganda | 9 February 2017 | Achola Rosario | America First: Uganda welcomes Trump in his own words #everysecondcounts | No | Video |
| Albania | 10 February 2017 | Karaoke Shqip | "America First, Albania Second (Official) | Introduction video to Trump #EverySecondCounts" | No | Video |
| China (People's Republic of) | 10 February 2017 | Hutong School | "America First, China Second #EverySecondCounts (Official)" | No | Video |
| Ireland | 10 February 2017 | eightytwenty | "America First, Ireland Second." | No | Video |
| Israel | 10 February 2017 | Sascha Engel | ISRAEL SECOND / Israel First (Official) - #EverySecondCounts | No | Video |
| Mexico | 10 February 2017 | Phenomeno Studios | "MEXICO SECOND - (Official) | #EverySecondCounts #VibraMexico" | No | Video |
| Romania | 10 February 2017 | Matthew Dima | "America First & Romania Second or at Least Top 100 Please (OFFICIAL)" | No | Video (alternate) |
| Romania | 10 February 2017 | Cronica Cârcotașilor | "America first, Romania second! #everysecondcount" | No | Video |
| Singapore | 10 February 2017 | TheSmartLocal | "America First, Singapore Second (Official) - Welcoming Trump In His Own Words #EverySecondCounts" | No | Video |
| Japan | 11 February 2017 | Japan Second | "America First, Japan Second(Official)日本語字幕あり- Welcome President Trump" | No | Video |
| Algeria | 12 February 2017 | El Manchar | America First, Algeria Second | No | Video (Alternate) |
| Bosnia and Herzegovina | 12 February 2017 | Dino | "Bosnia first, America second" | No | Video |
| Colombia | 12 February 2017 | Mente Selecta | "America First, COLOMBIA Second (OFFICIAL) | #everysecondcounts" | No | Video |
| Georgia | 12 February 2017 | Fast&Fun | Georgia welcomes Trump / America first - Georgia Second | No | Video |
| India | 12 February 2017 | VCreat Studios | "America First, India Second(official) | #everysecondcounts - VCreat | No | Video |
| Iran | 12 February 2017 | RVAS SFS | Iran Second | No | Video |
| Japan | 13 February 2017 | Japan Second | "America First - Japan Second (OFFICIAL) #everysecondcounts #japansecond" | No | Video |
| Russia | 13 February 2017 | 451 Grad | "Russia Second or First | Russia welcomes Trump in his own words | everysecondcounts" | No | Video |
| Russia | 13 February 2017 | Let's Challenge! | America First, Russia Also / Russia Welcomes Trump In His Own Words #everysecondcounts | No | Video |
| Russia | 13 February 2017 | Maxim Krasnov | America First, Russia Second | No | Video |
| Pakistan | 13 February 2017 | Pakistani Reacts | "America First Pakistan Second? | Pakistani Welcomes Trump in His Own Words" | No | Video |
| Serbia | 13 February 2017 | maksic13 | "Serbia Second" | No | Video |
| Tunisia | 13 February 2017 | balbazz | Tunisia Welcomes Trump In His Own Words [Official] | No | Video |
| Turkey | 13 February 2017 | CEMCORDER | TURKEY SECOND Official America First | No | Video |
| Algeria | 14 February 2017 | travelergeek | America First | Algeria Second #everysecondcounts.eu | No | Video |
| Sweden | 14 February 2017 | OscW | "America First - Sweden second?" | No | Video |
| Norway | 15 February 2017 | NRK | "America First - Norway Second" | No | Video |
| Algeria | 17 February 2017 | Mumu Muslim | America First - Algeria Second - Morocco Last | No | Video (Alternate) |
| Indonesia | 17 February 2017 | POS RONDA | America First, Indonesia Second - A greeting for President Trump | No | Video |
| Norway | 17 February 2017 | Bjørndal TV | Norway Second #everysecondcounts - A message to Donald Trump from Norway | No | Video |
| Nicaragua | 17 February 2017 | Radio ChillyWilly | "America First, Nicaragua Second (Official)" | No | Video |
| Malaysia | 20 February 2017 | Haikal Idris | America First, Malaysia Second #everysecondcounts | No | Video |
| Ukraine | 20 February 2017 | Мамахохотала | "America First, Ukraine Second [Official]" | No | Video |
| Algeria | 21 February 2017 | iamsamib | America First, Algeria Second | everysecondcounts.eu | No | Video |
| Azerbaijan | 21 February 2017 | AdventureBaku | "AZERBAIJAN SECOND (official) America First | Donald Trump" | No | Video |
| Indonesia | 21 February 2017 | BigDish Indonesia | America First, Indonesia Second. | No | Video |
| Kenya | 22 February 2017 | Keneth Mueke | "America First Kenya Second" | No | Video |
| Ukraine | 23 February 2017 | Television News Service (ТСН) | "America first, Ukraine second! | Америка перша, Україна друга!" | No | Video |
| Canada | 24 February 2017 | Maclean's | "America first, Russia second, Canada third: Canada to Donald Trump" | No | Video |
| United Kingdom | 24 February 2017 | William Brocas | "America first, keep the U.K second! A real Brit greets Trump in his own words." | No | Video |
| Ethiopia | 26 February 2017 | EthioTube | America First, Ethiopia Second (Official) አሜሪካ ትቅደም፣ ኢትዮጵያ ትከተል | No | Video |
| Colombia | 27 February 2017 | Mensaje Directo | "America First, Colombia Second" | No | Video |
| Italy | 28 February 2017 | Barbascura X | "America First, ITALY SECOND! Italy welcomes Trump and his wig - GROG" | No | Video |
| Yemen | 28 February 2017 | Rwabiit | "America First, Yemen Second (OFFICIAL)" | No | Video |
| Republic of Korea | 3 March 2017 | JReport | "America First South Korea Second south korea impeachment 2017/03/10" | No | Video |
| Libya | 13 March 2017 | From the Last | America first Libya second (official) | No | Video |
| Republic of Korea | 6 April 2017 | Howl Lin | "America First, South Korea Second [Official] - 웰컴 트럼프 #EverySecondCounts" | No | Video |
| Nigeria | 11 April 2017 | SaharaTV | "America First, Nigeria Second" | No | Video |
| United Kingdom | 12 April 2017 | ZeroSquared | "America First, UK Second (official) #everysecondcounts" | No | Video |
| Maldives | 29 April 2017 | Silky Fox Productions | "America First - Maldives Second" | No | Video |
| Philippines | Unknown | Unknown | "America First, Philippines Second?" | No | Video |
| Poland | Unknown | Unknown | "America First, Poland Second?" | No | Video |
| Bangladesh | May 2017 | Naveed Mahbub | "America First, Bangladesh Second" | No | Video |
| Panama | 6 June 2017 | GUN Productions PTY | "Panama Wants to be Second" | No | Video |
| Afghanistan | Unknown | Unknown | America First, Afghanistan Second | No | Video |
| Tunisia | Unknown | Unknown | America First, Tunisia Second | No | Video |
| Brunei | Unknown | Unknown | America First, Brunei Second | No | Video |
| Vietnam | Unknown | Unknown | America First, Vietnam Second | No | Video |

=== Other physical locations ===
The table below lists 43 videos for 40 unique entries.

| Location | Date | Creator(s) | Title | Link |
|---|---|---|---|---|
| Friesland | 3 February 2017 | Omrop Fryslân | America first Fryslân second | Video |
| Madeira | 5 February 2017 | 4Litro Produções | 4Litro - America first Madeira island second | Video |
| Baden-Württemberg | 7 February 2017 | Günther Oettinger | "America First – Baden-Württemberg Second" | Story |
| Bavaria | 7 February 2017 | quer | "America First - Bavaria Second!" | Video |
| Cologne | 7 February 2017 | Immisitzung | Cologne Second (Official) / Immisitzung | Video |
| Trier | 7 February 2017 | OK54 Bürgerrundfunk | Trier first. America second. It's true. | Video |
| Azores | 8 February 2017 | helfimed | "America First, AZORES Second..." | Video |
| Groningen | 8 February 2017 | BoerenJongens | Groningen Second | Groningen response to "Netherlands Second" video | Video |
| Lower Franconia | 8 February 2017 | Main-Post | America FIRST! Lower Franconia SECOND! Or at least THIRD? | Video |
| Pinhel | 8 February 2017 | Associação Juvenil Falcões da Europa EUROHAWK | America First, Pinhel Second | Video |
| Regensburg | 8 February 2017 | BR24 | America First - Regensburg Second | BR24 | Video |
| Saarland | 8 February 2017 | Ungekocht-Geniessbar | Saarland Second (Official) | Video |
| Rhenish Hesse | 10 February 2017 | Rheinhessen Second | Rheinhessen Second (official) | Video |
| Kosovo | 10 February 2017 | scipiosaatchi | America First Kosovo Second (KOSOVO REACT TO THE NETHERLANDS WELCOMES TRUMP) | Saatchi | Video |
| Venice | 10 February 2017 | DNA Italia srl | "AMERICA First VENICE Second" | Video |
| Valencia | 11 February 2017 | Victor van Herpt Valdivia | America First, València Second? #everysecondcounts | Video |
| Antarctica | 12 February 2017 | Ikenna | America First, Antarctica Second! #Everysecondcounts | Video |
| Berlin | 12 February 2017 | ECHTES BERLIN | America First, Berlin Second (official) #everysecondcounts | Video |
| Heidenheim (district) | 12 February 2017 | Heidenheimer Zeitung | America First, Heidenheim Second. Or third. Fourth? Fifteenth???! (OFFICIAL) | Video |
| Hong Kong | 13 February 2017 | 香港01 | America First, Hong Kong Second? | Video |
| Hesse | 14 February 2017 | hr-fernsehen | America First - Hessen Second! | Video |
| Pfaffenhofen an der Ilm | 14 February 2017 | Paf 2go | Amerika First Pfahofa Second! | Video |
| Schleswig-Holstein | 14 February 2017 | shz.de – Nachrichten aus Schleswig-Holstein | "America first, Schleswig-Holstein second" | Video |
| Adelboden | 15 February 2017 | Adelboden Second | Adelboden (Switzerland) Second | #everysecondcounts #adelbodensecond reaction Deville | Video |
| Grevenmacher | 15 February 2017 | Collab Bro | Grevenmacher Second (Official) | CollabBro? | Video |
| Catalonia | 16 February 2017 | APM? TV3 | APM? - America First, Catalonia Second (Official Video) | Video |
| Catalonia | 16 February 2017 | Polònia TV3 | Polònia - "America First, Catalonia Second" | Video |
| Kosovo | 17 February 2017 | Gegnia Film | "America First - Kosovo Second" | Video |
| Naples | 17 February 2017 | DJfamousmill | "Naples second | Reaction to Trump's America First [Parody]" | Video |
| North Pole | 17 February 2017 | Siemeke | North Pole second (official) | Welcome message to Donald Trump #everysecondcounts | Video |
| Taiwan (Republic of China) | 18 February 2017 | Graham Dart | "Taiwan No.2 台灣難八凸 America First... Taiwan Second" | Video |
| Canary Islands | 19 February 2017 | KMACHA | America First, Canary Islands Second! #everysecondcounts | Video |
| Pfalz | 19 February 2017 | Leo Katz | America first, Pfalz second l #EverySecondCounts | Video |
| Rinteln | 19 February 2017 | Rinteln Aktuell | America First - Rinteln second! | Video |
| Antwerp | 21 February 2017 | Het Beleg van Antwerpen | "America First, Antwerp Better" | Video |
| Fribourg | 21 February 2017 | Freiburger Nachrichten | Freiburg Second | Video |
| Saxony | 21 February 2017 | RADIO PSR | AMERICA FIRST, SAXONIA SECOND [official] | Video |
| Mannheim | 25 February 2017 | David Bilderbrand | "America First - Monnem Vorne" | Video |
| Ortenau | 2 March 2017 | HITRADIO OHR - Einfach näher dran | "America First. Black Forest Second." | Video |
| Santa Cruz, California | 8 March 2017 | Santa Cruz New Tech MeetUp | America First, America - Santa Cruz Too v3 | Video |
| East Frisia | 16 March 2017 | Ostfriesland | "Ostfriesland Second" - Extended Director's Cut (official) - America First comedy | Video |
| Roman Empire | 21 June 2017 | Bygonera | "Rome first, America second" | Video |
| Taiwan (Republic of China) | 30 June 2017 | Taiwan Second | "America First / Taiwan Second" | Video |

=== Other videos ===
The table below lists 16 videos.

| Entity | Date | Creator(s) | Title | Link |
|---|---|---|---|---|
| Luca | 3 February 2017 | laserluca | America First, Luca Second | Video |
| European Union | 9 February 2017 | Felix Herrmann | "America First - Europe second!" | Video |
| Mordor | 9 February 2017 | Phil Laude | "America First, Mordor Second" | Video |
| Muslim world | 10 February 2017 | Datteltäter | "America First - Muslim World Second" | Video |
| Westeros | 11 February 2017 | Dziobak Larp TV | America First, Westeros Second | Video |
| Tatooine | 13 February 2017 | Government of Tatooine | America first - Tatooine second? #everysecondcounts | Video |
| Native American nation | 14 February 2017 | On Native Ground | America First! Native America 567th! (official) #EverySecondCounts #noDAPL #Trump | Video |
| Wilderness | 14 February 2017 | ForbiddenNickname | America First, The Wilderness Second | Video |
| German students | 15 February 2017 | Bayerischer Rundfunk | America First - German Students Second - Tutorial for Donald Trump (Official) | Video |
| Galactic Empire | 16 February 2017 | Lord Stonemaker | America First, the Galactic Empire Second | Video |
| WebHostingDays | 20 February 2017 | CloudFest | "America First - WorldHostingDays Second: The Cloud Festival Welcomes Trump in His Own Words" | Video |
| Saami people | 21 February 2017 | Suohpanterror | Suohpanterror - America first, Saami second | Video |
| Sunrise Communications AG | 21 February 2017 | Sunrise | "America First | Sunrise Second - #everysecondcounts" | Video |
| Minecraft | 22 February 2017 | TutAdventures: Minecraft Mapmaking & Game Design | Trump: "America first, Minecraft second!" #everysecondcounts | Video |
| God | 24 February 2017 | Prisma IMPACT | God first - your neighbour second (Official) #everysecondcounts | Video |
| Elective doctors (Austria) | 1 March 2017 | WahlarztTV | Wahlärzte second | Verein für Wahl- und Spitalsärzte Steiermark (Association for elective and hospital doctors in Styria) | Video |
| Ocean | 18 March 2017 | maketheoceangreat again | "America First, Ocean Second #everysecondcounts" | Video |

== See also ==
- Political positions of Donald Trump
- Nationalism
- National identity
- National memory
- Self-criticism
- World community
