= De Avondshow met Arjen Lubach =

- Genre: late night satire
- Created by: Arjen Lubach
- Written by: List: Tex de Wit; Jonathan van het Reve; Arjen Lubach; Diederik Smit; Thijs van Domburg; Jeroen Weghs; Jop Eikelboom; Edo Schoonbeek; Thom Egberts; Emilio Guzman; Annemarie Faber; Jurg van Ginkel; Frank Brasser; Thomas Gast; Tjibbe Beerda; Hielke Jan Borger; Jenny Rozema; Danique Leenstra; Mirthe Westrik; Louise de Vos; Maartje Huvenaars
- Directed by: Jan Gitsels; Henk van Engen; Juliet Brouwer; Marnix Kaart; Gerben van den Hoven
- Presented by: Arjen Lubach
- Starring: Diederik Smit; Tex de Wit; Jonathan van het Reve; Lisa Ostermann; Soumaya Ahouaoui
- Voices of: Diederik Smit; Janine Abbring
- Theme music composer: Arjen Lubach
- Country of origin: Netherlands
- Original language: Dutch
- No. of seasons: 6
- No. of episodes: 226

Production
- Producers: Pieter Klok; Irene van den Brekel
- Production location: NEP Studio 4, Hilversum
- Editors: Joey van Noortwijk; Dolf de Haan; Erwin de Leeuw; Sjoerd Vogel; Nils Rensen; Briël van Rijsbergen; Jelte Heijnen
- Running time: 23–41 minutes

Original release
- Network: VPRO (NPO 1)
- Release: 21 February 2022 – 31 October 2024

De Avondshow met Arjen Lubach ("The Evening show with Arjen Lubach") was a Dutch late night satire show, broadcast by VPRO on NPO 1. It was presented by Dutch comedian Arjen Lubach.

It aired Monday through Thursday at 22:10, premiering on 21 February 2022, almost a year after Lubach's previous programme (Zondag met Lubach) ended.

On 30 May 2024, Lubach revealed that he would leave VPRO after airing one more season in the fall of that year. The final episode aired on 31 October 2024. The next day, it was revealed that Lubach and his team would transfer to RTL with a new show, later revealed to be titled Lubach.

== Background ==
In March 2021, Lubach's previous programme (Zondag met Lubach) aired its final episode after thirteen seasons. In May 2021, Lubach revealed that he would return to Dutch television in 2022 with a new daily show. In October 2021, in an interview with NPO Radio 1, Lubach revealed that he, in preparation for his new show, has spoken with a 15-year-long executive producer of The Daily Show with Jon Stewart and Trevor Noah.

De Avondshow was filmed daily in the afternoon and broadcast the same day at 22:10 on NPO 1. During its run, De Avondshow had a few special live broadcasts. On 15 March 2023, the day of the Dutch provincial elections, Lubach held a special live broadcast on NPO 3, showing the latest exit polls, and with special guest Randy Feltface. On 29 February 2024, De Avondshow held a special live broadcast at 16:45, where he invited Joost Klein to premiere his song "Europapa", the Dutch entry for the Eurovision Song Contest 2024.

== Recurring segments ==
After starting each episode with a standup monologue, the majority of the episode is Lubach sitting behind his desk discussing a main topic. The following segments have made at least one appearance:

- "En Nou is het Afgelopen" (season 1-6), where Lubach speaks negatively about a recent news topic.
- "Sport Studio" (season 1-6), where sport expert Diederik Smit discusses last weekend's biggest sport events and matches.
- "Tot Op De Bodem" (season 1-6), where Lubach dives into a long-lasting recent news topic based on statistics and research, often with reporters in guest roles.
- "Dossierkennis" (season 1-6), similar to "Tot Op De Bodem", where Lubach gets a physical file folder handed to him, discussing a recent topic in-depth.
- "Reisbureau" (season 1-6), where Lubach discusses a problem or conflict in a specific foreign country.
- "Kijkersvragen" (season 1-6), where fictional questions by viewers are read aloud and answered by Lubach, all relating to a recent news topic. Lubach often calls in guest Jonathan van het Reve to give advice.
- "Geopolitiek Dynamiek Rubriek" (season 1-6), where an international news topic (relating to multiple countries) is discussed.
- "Ancient History of The Earth: Stories of Human Kind" (season 4), a segment that appeared once, where the ongoing Israeli–Palestinian conflict was explained for the entirety of the episode.
- "Twistgesprek (met Tex en Jonathan)" (season 2-6), where Tex de Wit and Jonathan van het Reve perform a debate.
- "Bezorgde Boomers" (season 2, 5-6), where boomers send in a fictional video message, expressing their concerns about a certain modern development.
- "Campagne Lasagne" (season 4), a segment that first appeared in Lubach's previous programme (Zondag met Lubach), where he discussed the then-ongoing election campaign for the 2023 Dutch general election.
- "Hoe gaat'ie met de formatie?" (season 5), where the then-ongoing 2023–2024 Dutch cabinet formation was discussed.
- "Profielportret (proudly sponsored by Beekman Natuurhuisjes)", where Lubach goes in-depth about a famous person, always ending the segment with answering the question "would I spend time with this person in a Beekman bungalow?".
- "Arjens Kutleven", where Lubach irritatingly discusses a problem in his personal life.

In the show's final episode, Lubach spent the entire episode discussing why everything is better nowadays, rather than in former times. Multiple segments that appeared throughout all seasons made up a part of the episode.

== Music ==
De Avondshow has made multiple songs and videoclips that were released during its episodes.

- "Vrijdagavond Avondshow ft. Kraantje Pappie", a song in celebration of the show's first Friday broadcast. Released on 11 March 2022 (season 1, episode 12). On 8 March 2022, NPO 1, RTL 4 and SBS6 had a collaborative broadcast for the launch of the Giro 555 fund for the 2022 Russian invasion of Ukraine. Therefore, episodes of De Avondshow that week were aired from Tuesday until Friday.
- "Volgend jaar bij ons ft. Alex Ploeg", a song in celebration of the Dutch entry for the Eurovision Song Contest 2022. Released on 6 May 2022 (season 1, episode 40).
- "Verder naar rechts / Weiter nach rechts ft. Jan Böhmermann" Released on 7 March 2024 (season 5, episode 28).
- "Hoe gaat'ie met de formatie?", a full-length version of the intro of the recurring segment of the same name. Released on 28 March 2024 (season 5, episode 39).

== Avondshow Stand-Ups ==
Midway through the first season, production of regular episodes was paused. Instead, stand up comedians were invited, and the episodes were presented as Avondshow Stand-Ups.

The first series was filmed on 1 April and broadcast from 4 until 7 April 2022, starring Serine Ayari, Pieter Derks, Raoul Heertje, Glodi Lugungu, Alex Ploeg, Kim Schuddeboom, Tim Fransen and Hans Sibbel.

Avondshow Stand-Ups returned for a second series. It was broadcast from 26 until 29 December 2023, starring Kasper van der Laan, Yunus Aktas, Rayen Panday, Janneke de Bijl, Merijn Scholten, Lisa Ostermann, Dolf Jansen and Wouter Monden.

== Seasons ==
Season	Time slot	Episodes	First airdate	Last airdate
1	Mon–Thu, 22:10–22:40	40	21 February 2022	6 May 2022
2	Mon–Thu, 22:10–22:40	36	5 September 2022	3 November 2022
3	Mon–Thu, 22:10–22:40	40	23 January 2023	30 March 2023
4	Mon–Thu, 22:10–22:40	35	4 September 2023	2 November 2023
5	Mon–Thu, 22:10–22:40	39	22 January 2024	28 March 2024
6	Mon–Thu, 22:10–22:40	36	2 September 2024	31 October 2024
