= Tex de Wit =

Dutch television presenter and chess player (born 1986)

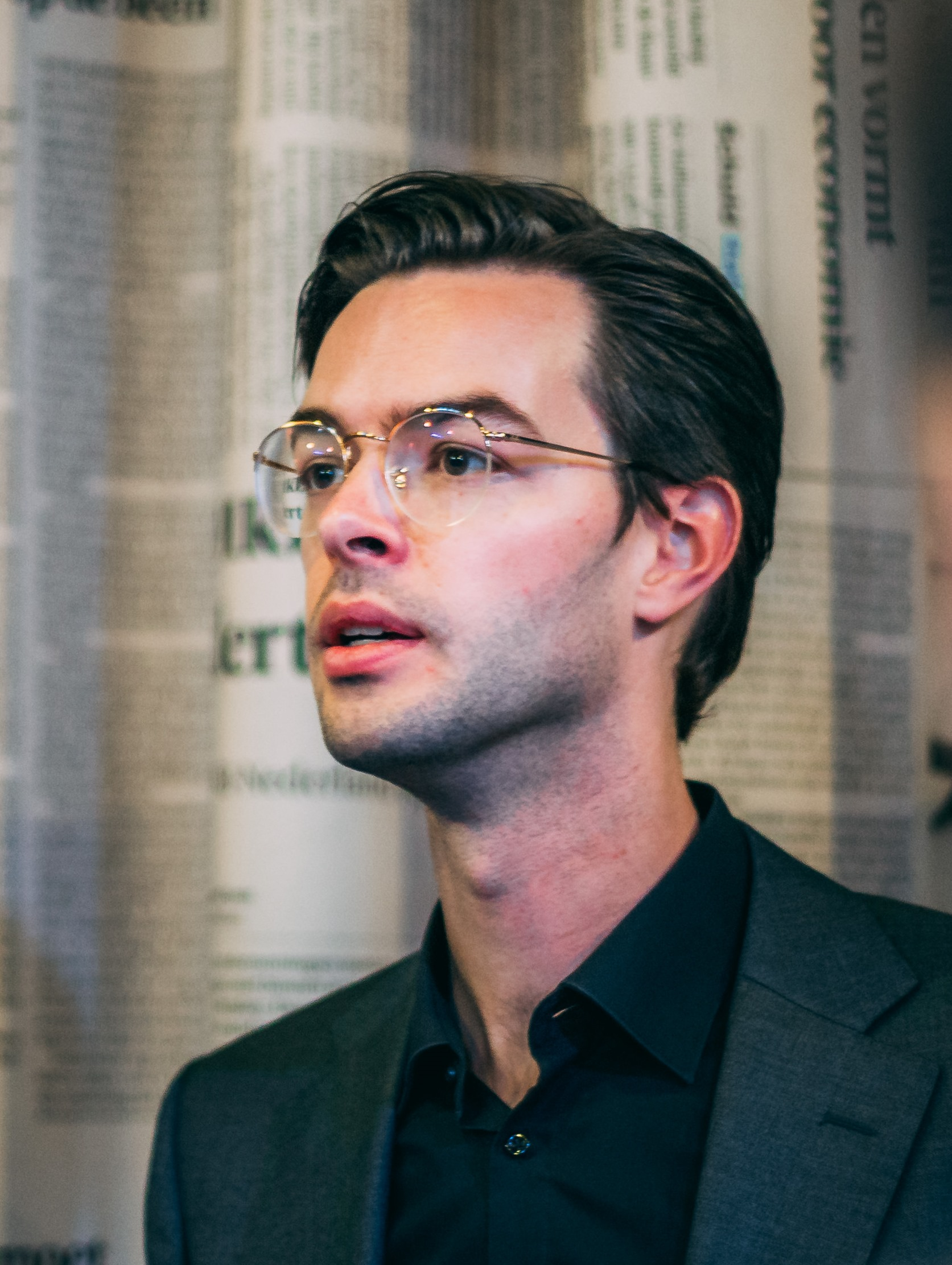
- De Wit (2019)
- Born: 17 May 1986 (age 40); Amsterdam, Netherlands
- Chess career
- Country: Netherlands
- Title: FIDE Master (2010)
- Peak rating: 2333 (March 2014)
- Notable work: Klikbeet; Zondag met Lubach; Makkelijk Scoren; De Avondshow met Arjen Lubach

Comedy career
- Years active: 2011–

Tex de Wit (born 17 May 1986, in Amsterdam) is a Dutch comedian, writer, actor, chess player and television presenter.

== Biography ==
De Wit is the son of comic artist Peter de Wit. In 2011, after studying journalism at the University of Amsterdam he discovered that stand-up comedy is his passion.

=== Television career ===
De Wit was featured in episodes of De Rijdende Rechter in 2012. In 2013 he audited for Comedytrain, for which he was immediately recruited. Since this he makes columns for the VARA-radio program Spijkers met koppen. In 2014 he was added to the writers team of the VPRO-program Zondag met Lubach. From the first season forward De Wit was writer for this show and beginning with season 4 he is also visible on camera as a "news reporter". From 2022 until 2024, he fulfilled the same roles for De Avondshow met Arjen Lubach, the successor of Zondag met Lubach. Since 2025, he again fulfills the same roles for LUBACH, the successor of De Avondshow.

In the winter of 2015 De Wit participated with the NCRV-program De Slimste Mens, for which he entered the finale. De Wit is also a frequent guest at De Wereld Draait Door since 2016/2017, frequent jury member for the NCRV-program De Rijdende Rechter, and works for the comedy sketch program Klikbeet.

In 2019, 2020 and 2024 he presented, together with Jonathan van het Reve and Diederik Smit, the satirical sports program Makkelijk Scoren for VPRO.

=== Chess career ===
In 2010, De Wit obtained the FIDE Master (FM) title.

In 2011 he won the Wil Haggenburg tournament and became the best chess player at the Chess federation Groot-Amsterdam.

In 2012 he won at the Kees Besselink c4 tournament, for which he only signed up the night before the tournament.

Since the season of 2019–2020 De Wit plays in the Masterclass for the Kennemer Combinatie.
