= Lubach (TV program) =

2025 Dutch television series

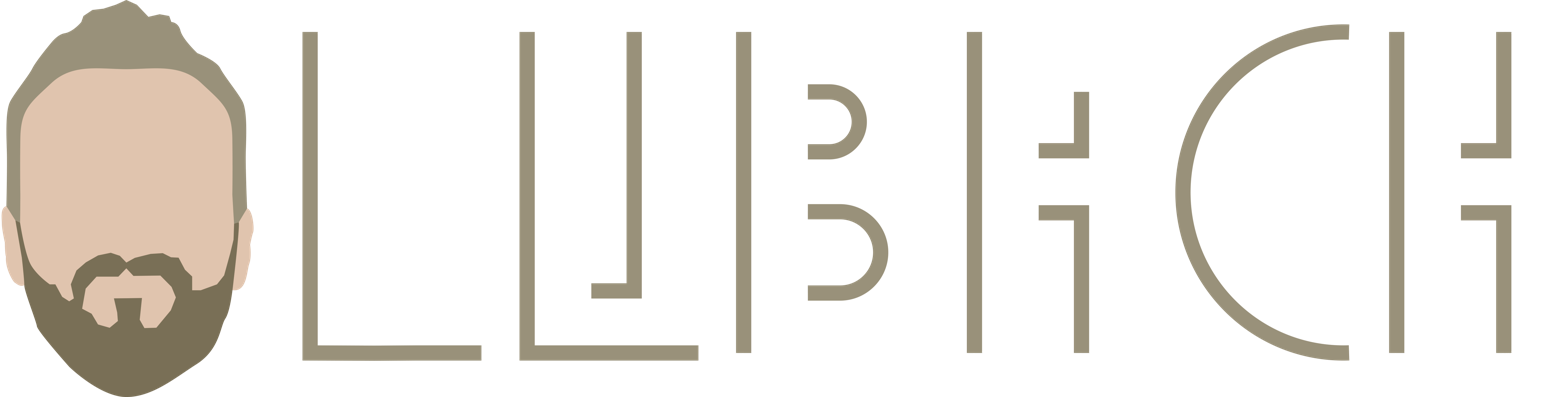
- Logo
- Genre: Satire; Current affairs Talk show
- Written by: List: Tex de Wit; Jonathan van het Reve; Arjen Lubach; Diederik Smit; Thijs van Domburg; Jeroen Weghs; Jop Eikelboom; Edo Schoonbeek; Thom Egberts; Emilio Guzman; Annemarie Faber; Jurg van Ginkel; Frank Brasser; Thomas Gast; Tjibbe Beerda; Hielke Jan Borger; Jenny Rozema; Danique Leenstra; Mirthe Westrik; Louise de Vos; Bart van den Donker; Ezra van Hamelen; Hannah Visser; Peter Buurman; Maud Hermans
- Directed by: Jan Gitsels; Henk van Engen; Juliet Brouwer; Marnix Kaart; Gerben van den Hoven
- Presented by: Arjen Lubach
- Starring: Tex de Wit; Diederik Smit; Jonathan van het Reve; Ezra van Hamelen; Thomas Gast; Soumaya Ahouaoui; Danique Leenstra
- Theme music composer: Arjen Lubach & Tangarine
- Country of origin: Netherlands
- Original language: Dutch
- No. of seasons: 4

Production
- Executive producer: Janine Abbring
- Producers: Pieter Klok; Irene van den Brekel; Esmée van de Braak; Soon Mi van Dijk
- News editor: Janine Abbring
- Production location: Studio 4, Media Park Hilversum
- Editors: Joey van Noortwijk; Erwin de Leeuw; Briël van Rijsbergen; Sjoerd Vogel; Jelte Heijnen; Vincent Manuhuwa
- Running time: 22-32 minutes
- Production company: Human Factor TV

Original release
- Network: RTL 4
- Release: 24 March 2025 – present

Related
- Zondag met Lubach; De Avondshow met Arjen Lubach

LUBACH is a Dutch satirical news and talk television program created and hosted by Arjen Lubach. It premiered on RTL 4 on 24 March 2025 and airs Monday through Thursday at 22:00 (at 23:00 from season 4 onwards). The show is produced by Human Factor TV and features many of the same team members from Arjen Lubach's earlier programs on Dutch public television.

== Format ==
Each episode of Lubach follows a consistent structure:

- An opening statement announced by someone off screen: "Het is tien uur geweest. Hier is Arjen Lubach" ("It is past ten o'clock. Here is Arjen Lubach"). From the fourth season onwards, it was changed to "Vanuit Studio 4 in Hilversum is hier Arjen Lubach" ("From Studio 4 in Hilversum, here is Arjen Lubach");
- A brief summary of the day’s news delivered standing by Arjen Lubach (this segment was removed from the second season onwards);
- A desk segment introducing the main topics (typically two or per night, except for Thursdays which features a single main topic presented as Diep Duik Donderdag ("Deep Dive Thursday"));
- A closing statement by Lubach himself: "Dit was Lubach, ik was Arjen" ("This was Lubach, I was Arjen").

Some episodes feature an interview with one or more guests, a stand up comedy segment, or a musical performance.

The show’s team includes regular satirical writers such as Tex de Wit, Jonathan van het Reve, Diederik Smit, among others. They regularly have appearances as reporters or a fictional character in the main topic segments. The editorial lead is Janine Abbring.

== Background ==
Arjen Lubach had been a prominent satirical television host in the Netherlands for over a decade, best known for Zondag met Lubach (2014–2021) and De Avondshow met Arjen Lubach (2022–2024), both aired on the Dutch public broadcaster VPRO. In May 2024, Arjen Lubach announced he would be leaving VPRO and NPO after one more season of De Avondshow in the fall.

On 1 November 2024, a day after the final Avondshow episode, Lubach revealed that he and his team had signed a deal with commercial broadcaster RTL Nederland to create a new daily satire show. According to RTL’s content director Peter van der Vorst, Lubach and his editorial team would be granted full creative independence over the show for at least three years.

In November 2026, RTL announced that Lubach's collaboration with them is renewed until late 2029.

== Reception ==
The debut episode of Lubach on 24 March 2025 attracted 1.94 million viewers (including delayed viewing) with a market share of 50.7% among the key 25–54 demographic.

== Online presence ==
=== YouTube ===
Lubach has an official YouTube channel where all in-depth segments are uploaded separately. Additional content, such as interviews and behind-the-scenes footage, is also available. On 8 April 2025, Lubach received the YouTube Silver Play Button after the channel surpassed 100,000 subscribers.

=== Instagram ===
The program’s Instagram account features:

- Short reels with episode highlights;
- Posters promoting upcoming episodes;
- Behind-the-scenes content, including teaser videos before the show’s premiere.

== Seasons ==
Overview of seasons
Season	Timeslot	Start date	End date	Episodes
1	Mon–Thu, 22:00–22:30	24 March 2025	12 June 2025	44
2	Mon–Thu, 22:00–22:30	1 September 2025	13 November 2025	43 (Note: On 29 October 2025, the day of the Dutch general election, Lubach had a short live airing at 20:30 as part of that evening's RTL Tonight broadcast. Thereby, it doesn't count as an episode.)
3	Mon–Thu, 22:00–22:30	2 February 2026	9 April 2026	40
4	Mon–Thu, 23:00–23:30 (Note: Episodes are available on Videoland at 21:00 while being broadcast on RTL 4 two hours later.)	31 August 2026	13 November 2026 (Note: The season finale, planned to air on 12 November 2026, aired the next day. A rewritten extra episode aired on 12 November instead.)	41

== See also ==
- Zondag met Lubach
- De Avondshow met Arjen Lubach
