= Greg Shapiro =

Dutch American comedian (born 1968)

Gregory Shapiro
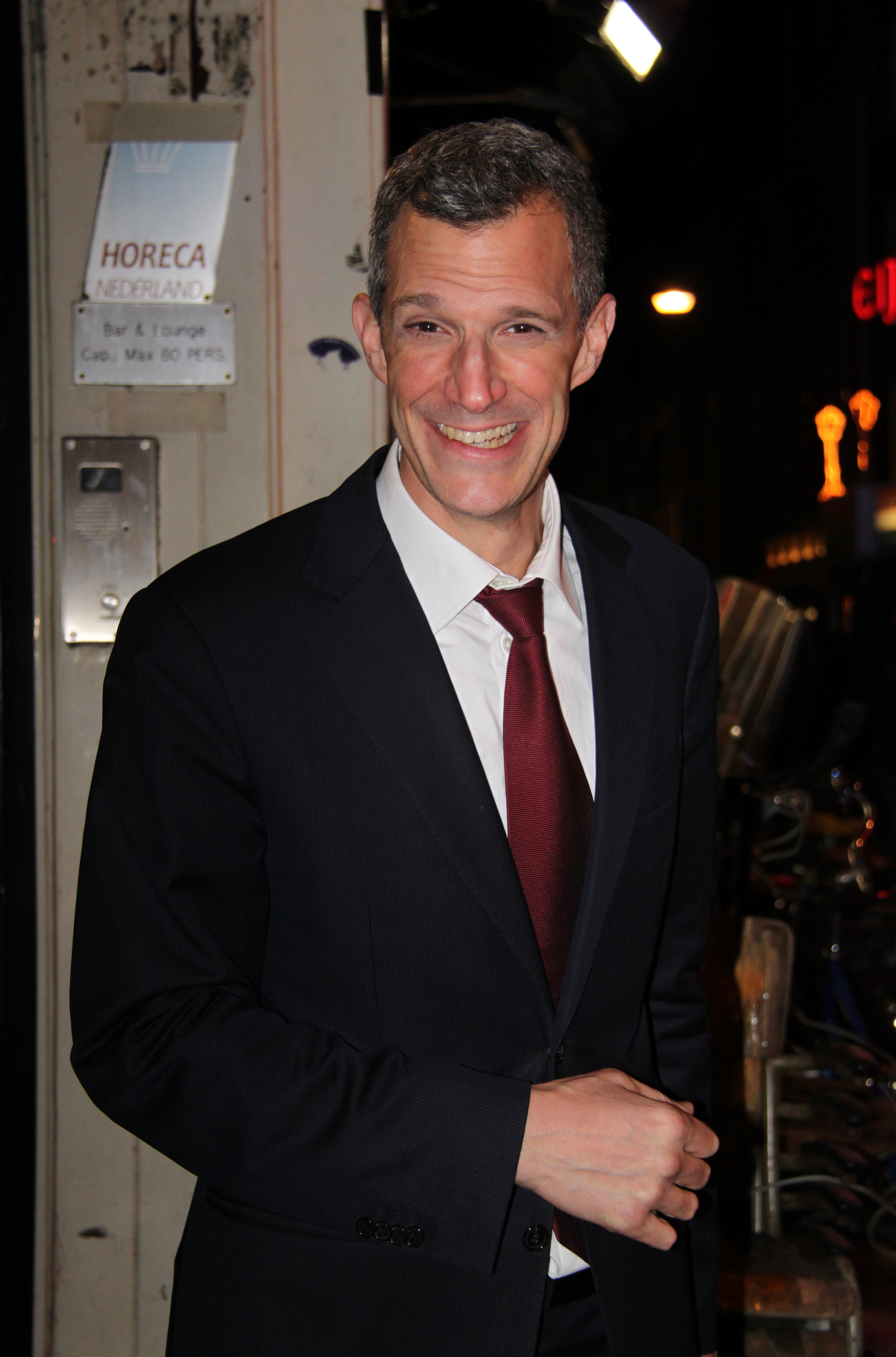
- Shapiro in October 2012
- Born: 1968 (age 57–58); Chicago, IL, United States
- Citizenship: United States; Netherlands
- Education: Northwestern University
- Occupations: Actor, author, comedian, television/online producer
- Years active: 1994–present
- Known for: Boom Chicago, Comedy Central News
- Notable work: How to Be Orange: An Alternative Dutch Assimilation Course (2014), How to Be Dutch: The Quiz (2016)
- Greg Shapiro introducing himself recorded November 2015
- Website: www.gregoryshapiro.com

Gregory Scott Shapiro (born 1968) is a Dutch American comedian, best known as a member of the comedy group Boom Chicago, host of the Dutch satirical news program Comedy Central News (nl) and the author of How to Be Orange: An Alternative Dutch Assimilation Course and How to Be Dutch: the Quiz.

Shapiro was born in Chicago, Illinois, and he graduated from Northwestern University in Theater. In 1994, he came to the Netherlands to help establish comedy theater Boom Chicago, where he worked with Seth Meyers, Jordan Peele, Ike Barinholtz, Kay Cannon, Heather Anne Campbell, and Allison Silverman, among others. In 2004, he voiced the FloridaVotingMachine video that went viral before there was YouTube. In 2007, Shapiro hosted Comedy Central News on Comedy Central and started his own video weblog Highly Dubious News. His radio column The New and Improved America appeared on BNR Newsradio in 2008. His vlog War for the White House appeared on Volkskrant.nl in 2008.

In 2009, Shapiro was named a ‘Hero of Amsterdam’ by Time Out Amsterdam, for which he was a columnist. His writings have also appeared in Hollands Glorie magazine and The XPat Journal.

Shapiro has written and performed the solo shows Going Dutch, How to Be Orange, Superburger, How to Be Frisian, The Madness of King Donald, Part Time Hypocrite, List Pusher, Leaving Trumpland and Leaving Trumpland 2.0. Shapiro also has 20 years experience in Corporate Speaking / Entertainment. In 2010, he joined Maurice de Hond at Boom Chicago for the comedy show Political Party, in which he improvised with (and impersonated) Dutch politicians such as Lodewijk Asscher, Bert Koenders, Jeanine Hennis-Plasschaert, Maxime Verhagen, Ronald Plasterk, Femke Halsema, Hero Brinkman, and Tofik Dibi.

In 2011, he created and presented the television programme Planet Nederland, a review of Dutch society as a nature documentary. It appeared on Dutch broadcaster VARA and on NPO Humor TV. In 2012, for NPO HumorTV, he presented a vlog about the Dutch elections called Verkiespijn and a vlog about the 2012 US election called United States of Shapiro.

Shapiro is currently the producer, writer and host of United States of Europe for Zoomin.TV. He is the host of the QuickestQuiz app. And he is the co-host of the ‘Amsterdam Comedy Podcast’.

Shapiro has written three books; How to Be Orange: An Alternative Dutch Assimilation Course and How to Be Dutch: the Quiz and The American Netherlander: 25 Years of Expat Tales

Shapiro has appeared in the films Down and Phileine Says Sorry, and in the soap series Goede tijden, slechte tijden.

In 2017 Shapiro did the voice-over of "The Netherlands Second" video from Zondag met Lubach; this video went viral with almost 39 million views.
