= Zondag met Lubach =

Dutch television series

- Also known as: ZML
- Genre: Satire
- Directed by: Jan Gitsels; Henk van Engen
- Presented by: Arjen Lubach
- Starring: Tex de Wit; Steye van Dam
- Opening theme: "El Orangutan" by Los Estrambóticos
- Country of origin: Netherlands
- Original language: Dutch
- No. of seasons: 13
- No. of episodes: 118

Production
- Producer: Irene van den Brekel
- Production locations: Theater Bellevue, Amsterdam
- Running time: 30 minutes
- Production companies: Human Factor TV; VPRO

Original release
- Network: NPO 3
- Release: 9 November 2014 – 28 March 2021

Related
- LUBACH; De Avondshow met Arjen Lubach

Zondag met Lubach (Dutch for 'Sunday with Lubach'), abbreviated as ZML, was a Dutch weekly satirical television programme that aired between 2014 and 2021, presented by Arjen Lubach and broadcast on NPO 3. Each week, Lubach talked for half an hour about the news of the past week through various fragments from the media infographics and investigative journalism. The show's main scriptwriters were Tex de Wit and Pieter Jouke. The program was recorded in the main auditorium of the Theater Bellevue in Amsterdam.

On 19 August 2020, Arjen Lubach revealed the program will come to an end. The last episode of Zondag met Lubach aired on 28 March 2021. Lubach later launched his late weeknight talk show and successor to Zondag met Lubach, De Avondshow met Arjen Lubach (lit. 'The Evening Show with Arjen Lubach'), which premiered on NPO 1 in February 2022; Zondag met Lubach's social media accounts and YouTube channel were turned into those of Avondshow's. In May 2024, Lubach announced he is leaving VPRO after one final season of De Avondshow. The final episode aired on October 31st, 2024. The next day, Lubach announced that he, along with his whole team, would transfer to RTL where his show is called LUBACH.

== Notable stunts ==
=== Pharaoh of the Netherlands (2015) ===
Arjen Lubach is a strong opponent of the monarchy of the Netherlands. Out of protest against the monarchy, he came up with a citizens initiative, in which he crowned himself "Pharaoh of the Netherlands", which, like 'King' is also a hereditary title. At the time of the airing of the show in which he introduced his initiative, it was 200 years since William I proclaimed himself a King of the Netherlands. For the citizens initiative Lubach needed a minimum of 40.000 endorsements, which he obtained while he was a guest at the Dutch talk show De Wereld Draait Door. With the minimum of 40.000 endorsements, the House of Representatives was obliged to talk about the initiative.

=== Donald Trump video (2017) ===
Zondag met Lubach inspired the global video contest Every Second Counts after it broadcast the parody video "The Netherlands welcomes Trump in his own words" on 22 January 2017. In the video, Donald Trump's speeches and actions –mostly from his election campaign– are imitated and mocked by voice actor Greg Shapiro, who gives a short description of the Netherlands using some self-mockery as well, finishing with the request that the Netherlands may come 'second' if America is to be 'first'. A semi-serious undertone is formed by fears that Trump's announced "America First" policy signifies isolationism, including withdrawing U.S. support for NATO: "If you screw NATO, you're gonna make our problems great again." The video went viral, being discussed by multiple international newsmedia and reaching over 73 million views worldwide by 3 February. On 2 February during Neo Magazin Royale, Jan Böhmermann challenged the Dutch's second place, broadcasting a rival video that claimed 'Germany second' whilst making fun of the Netherlands and Germany itself as well. Then, he encouraged other satirical talkshow producers in all European countries to make similar videos parodying Trump, themselves and challenging the Netherlands' second place behind America. Production teams in at least eleven other countries committed to making their own parody videos, and by 3 February, versions for Belgium (by De Ideale Wereld), Switzerland (by Deville Late Night), Denmark (by Natholdet), Portugal (by 5 Para A Meia-Noite) and Lithuania (by Laikykitės ten) had been released; these would all be gathered on the website everysecondcounts.eu.

=== Westeros the Series (2017) ===
In late August 2017, a YouTube channel named "Westeros The Series" uploaded a "trailer" for Westeros, a new 'television series' that would be set in a modern-day Westeros after the events of Game of Thrones, and would premiere in 2019. After getting attention from media, including The Daily Telegraph and Vice, the channel uploaded another video on YouTube in early September 2017, instead revealing that Zondag met Lubach would return on 10 September 2017. Zondag met Lubach's official YouTube channel also uploaded a combined version of the 'trailer'.

=== Nonsensical Rifle Addiction (2017) ===
On 8 October 2017, one week after the 2017 Las Vegas shooting, Zondag met Lubach aired a spoof advertisement called "Nonsensical Rifle Addiction", which highlighted the issue with gun violence and mass shootings in the United States, and also lampooned the United States's inability to introduce any binding form of gun control. The title is a play on the influential American gun rights organisation National Rifle Association of America (NRA). The video was retweeted by American actor Samuel L. Jackson after the Stoneman Douglas High School shooting in February 2018.

== Seasons ==
Season	Episodes	First aired	Last aired
1	8	9 November 2014	4 January 2015
2	6	22 February 2015	29 March 2015
3	8	20 September 2015	8 November 2015
4	8	10 January 2016	28 February 2016
5	10	4 September 2016	6 November 2016
6	10	22 January 2017	2 April 2017
7	10	10 September 2017	26 November 2017
8	10	28 January 2018	8 April 2018
9	10	16 September 2018	18 November 2018
10	10	13 October 2019	15 December 2019
11	10	16 February 2020	19 April 2020
12	10	20 September 2020	22 November 2020
13	8	7 February 2021	28 March 2021

== Awards ==
=== Zilveren Nipkowschijf (2016) ===
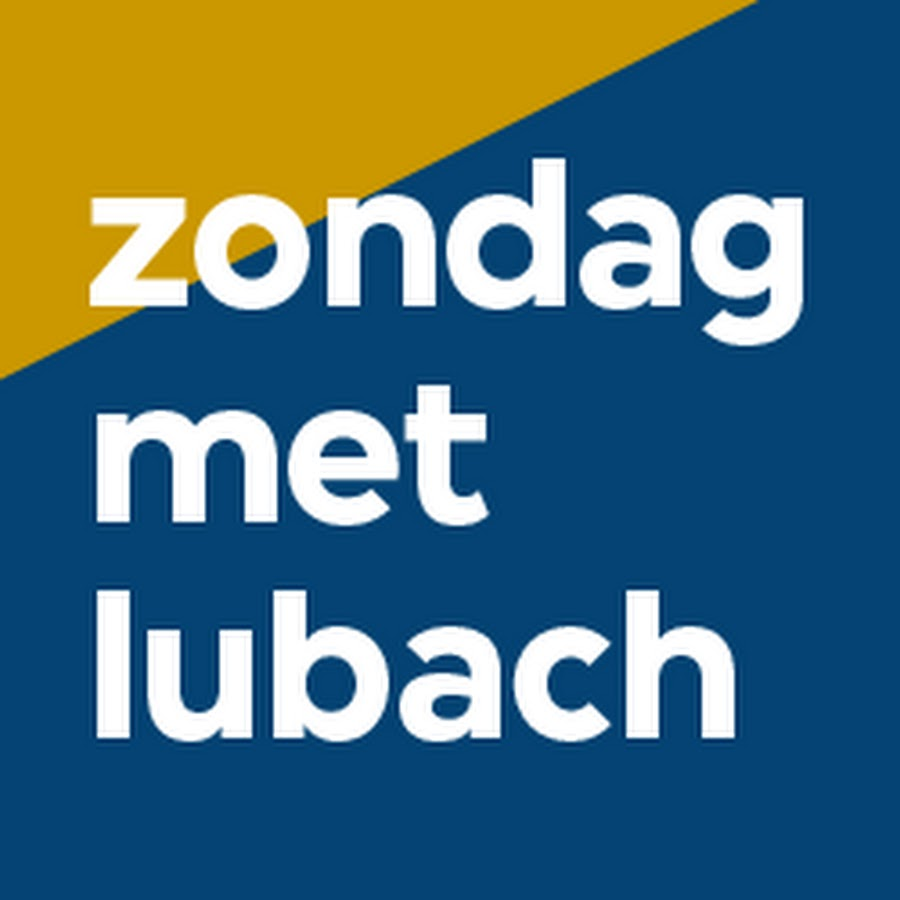
The show's social media profile icon

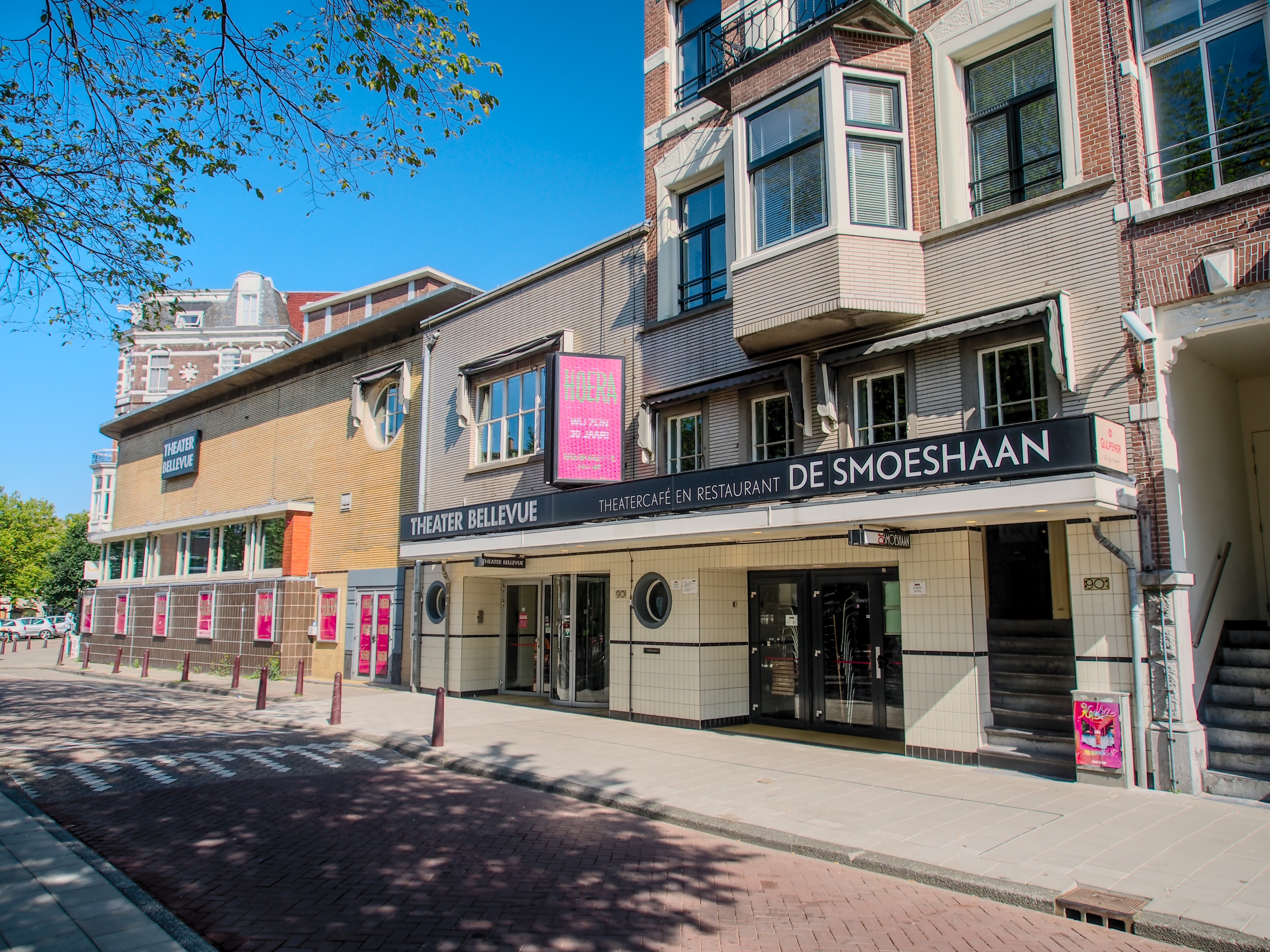
Theater Bellevue in Amsterdam, where the show took place

On 10 June 2016 Zondag met Lubach won the Zilveren Nipkowschijf. The winner of the prize is chosen by a jury consisting out of newspapers and magazines television critics. The year before, Zondag met Lubach received an honorable mention by the jury

=== Gouden Televizier-Ring (2017) ===
==== Best Television show ====
During the Televizier-Ring Gala on 11 October 2017, Zondag met Lubach was awarded the Gouden Televizier-Ring (Golden television ring) for "Best television program". Zondag met Lubach got a plurality of the vote with 47%. During the airing of the award show people could vote for one of the three nominees for "Best television program". The two other nominees were Beste Zangers and Expeditie Robinson. Arjen Lubach started off his acceptance speech with saying "Wat ontzettend terecht", meaning "How very much deserved" (meant as a joke). Furthermore, he praised the rest of his team and acknowledged their importance. This was the first time that a vpro-program won the prize. To get people to vote for Zondag met Lubach during the show, Arjen Lubach had an advert placed on the Ziggo Dome. In this advert the presenters of Beste zangers and Expeditie Robinson were urging people to vote for Zondag met Lubach. Lubach later thanked the presenters. This initially angered some people, because they thought that the advert was paid for with tax money. However, Lubach later said that this was not the case, but that he knew a few people who could get this done.

==== Best actor ====
To gain the attention of his viewers about the nomination for best actor, Lubach talked about it on his show, however he didn't talk about his own nomination. Instead, he talked about Erik de Vogel, who got nominated in the category for best actor. He requested people to vote for De Vogel, together with a catchphrase "Ludo verdient een kudo" meaning Ludo (name of the actor's role in Goede tijden, slechte tijden) deserves kudos. De Vogel did however not win the award, as it was given to Jeroen van Koningsbrugge instead.
