= Barbascura X =

Italian scientist, YouTuber, writer, TV presenter

- Born: 2 May 1987 (age 39); Taranto, Italy
- Other name: Barbascura
- Education: University of Bari
- Occupations: YouTuber, science communicator, writer

YouTube information
- Channel: Barbascura eXtra
- Years active: 2014-present
- Genres: Education, Comedy
- Subscribers: 1 million
- Views: 179 million
- Last updated: November 2025
- Website: barbascura.com

Barbascura X (real name unknown) (born 2 May 1987) is an Italian YouTuber, writer, comedian, and television host. He is very reserved about his private life, and his real name is not listed anywhere, to not create conflict with his research activity.

== Biography ==
Born in Taranto, he graduated in organic chemistry at the University of Bari, specialized in organic synthesis at the university of Bologna, and later obtained a doctorate abroad in green chemistry and production of materials from renewable sources.

He has worked in several laboratories in Europe participating in two Erasmus (Poitiers and Dublin) and carrying out both the professional career of chemist and that of researcher: at Trinity College in Dublin, working on the synthesis of new pharmaceutical products, in Paris for the National Institute of Health and Medical Research, on new techniques for the treatment and prevention of arteriosclerosis, and in Nice and Amsterdam by winning the European call for Marie Skłodowska-Curie Actions.

=== YouTube activity ===
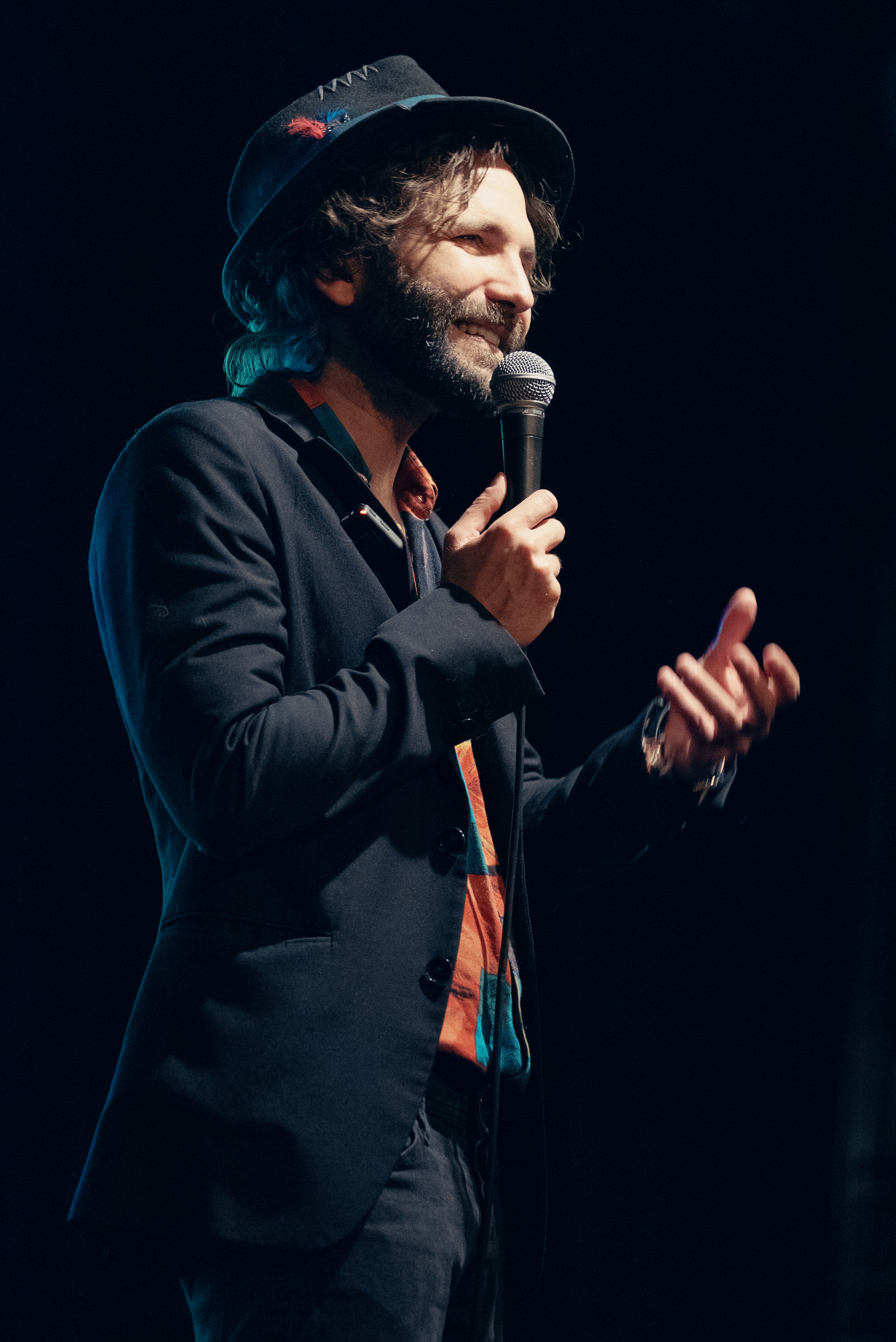
Barbascura X in 2024

He runs the YouTube channel Barbascura X, which includes the scientific dissemination format in humorous Scienza Brutta, the Riassuntazzi brutti brutti format in which he comically summarizes episodes of films and series, and Logos, travel stories in the third person. In 2022, the main channel, opened in 2014, has more than 900 000 subscribers with over 150 videos published and approximately 110 million total views.

He also owns and operates other YouTube channels: Barbascura eXtra, with more than 310,000 subscribers, Barbascura Music, Club Pirata and scienzabrutta4KIDS.

=== Television career ===
At the end of 2020 he is the protagonist of the four-part docu-fiction Post Scriptum - An optimistic look from the end of the world. Since March 2021, he has hosted the two-season series Micromostri con Barbascura X on DMAX, dedicated to insects and other small creatures. In the same year, on Rai 3 he had a column in the show Il posto giusto called The unusual inquiries of Barbascura X. He has also taken part in several Comedy Central programs such as Stand-up comedy and South Park - Pandemic Special combining with his monologues, science popularization and comedy.

In June of the same year, after having participated with a monologue about the birth of the universe at a TedX, he wrote and co-hosted a documentary with Luca Perri called Infodemic: the virus is us.

In 2022 he leads 72 animali pericolosi on DMAX; the program had a second season in 2024

Barbascura will appear in the horror videogame Unfollow.

== Voice work ==
- Narrator in Dinosaur Apocalypse (2022)
- Narrator in LifeDelfi (2023)

== TV Program ==
- Stand up comedy (Comedy Central, 2021–2022)
- Micromostri con Barbascura X (DMAX, 2021)
- 72 Animali Pericolosi con Barbascura X (DMAX, 2022–2024)
- Jurassic Night con Barbascura X (DMAX, 2022)
- Il collegio, docu-reality, episode 3x08 (Rai 2, 2023)
- Doc - Nelle tue mani, episode 3x03 (Rai 1, 2024) as Diego Bollini
- Sulle tracce dell'orso (DMAX, 2024)

== Literature Works ==
- Il satiro scientifico. Riprodursi male. Sesso e amore apparentemente contro natura. Gaia. Mondadori. 2023. ISBN 978-88-04-77359-7.
- Il satiro scientifico. Storie di merda. Scienza, usi e costumi della materia fecale. Gaia. Mondadori. 2023. ISBN 978-88-04-78409-8.
- Il satiro scientifico. I belli hyear rotto il cazzo. Elogio della bruttezza della natura. Gaia. Mondadori. 2024. ISBN 978-88-04-78410-4.
- Il satiro scientifico. Seghe mentali cosmiche. Spazio-tempo, buchi neri e altri onanismi astrofisici. Gaia. Mondadori. 2024. ISBN 978-88-04-79195-9.
- Il satiro scientifico. Mostrologia applicata. Manuale scientifico di sopravvivenza a zombie, vampiri e altre creature brutte e cattive. Gaia. Mondadori. 2025. ISBN 978-88-04-80102-3.
- Il genio non esiste (e a volte è un idiota). Numeri primi. Roma: Edizioni Tlön. 2020. ISBN 978-88-99684-69-3.
- Saggio erotico sulla fine del mondo. Oscar bestsellers. Mondadori. 2021. ISBN 978-88-04-75290-5.
- La versione del tardigrado improbabile. De Agostini. 2021. ISBN 978-88-5118-719-4.
- Barbascura X; Perri, Luca (2022). La tempesta imperfetta. Viaggio nella mente di chi crede alle fake news: NOI. De Agostini. ISBN 979-12-2120-264-9.

=== Graphic Novel ===
- Frank. Verona: Poliniani. 2019. ISBN 978-88-3211-817-9. illustrated by Boban Pesov

=== Comix ===
- Barbascura X spiega le cose. Roma: Gigaciao. 2023. illustrated by Sio (cartoonist)

== Podcast ==
- Storie brutte sulla scienza, 8 episodes (Audible, 2020–2021)
- Club Pirata, (YouTube, 2020–2021)
- Sputi, (2024), with Daniele Fabbri
- Storie brutte sulla scienza ma peggio, 8 episodes (Audible, 2025)

== Video games ==
- UNFOLLOW (Microsoft Windows, PS5, Xbox Series X/S, 2024) – cameo

== Awards ==
- YouTube Creator Awards: Silver Creator Award (2018)
