= Arjen Lubach =

Dutch comedian (born 1979)

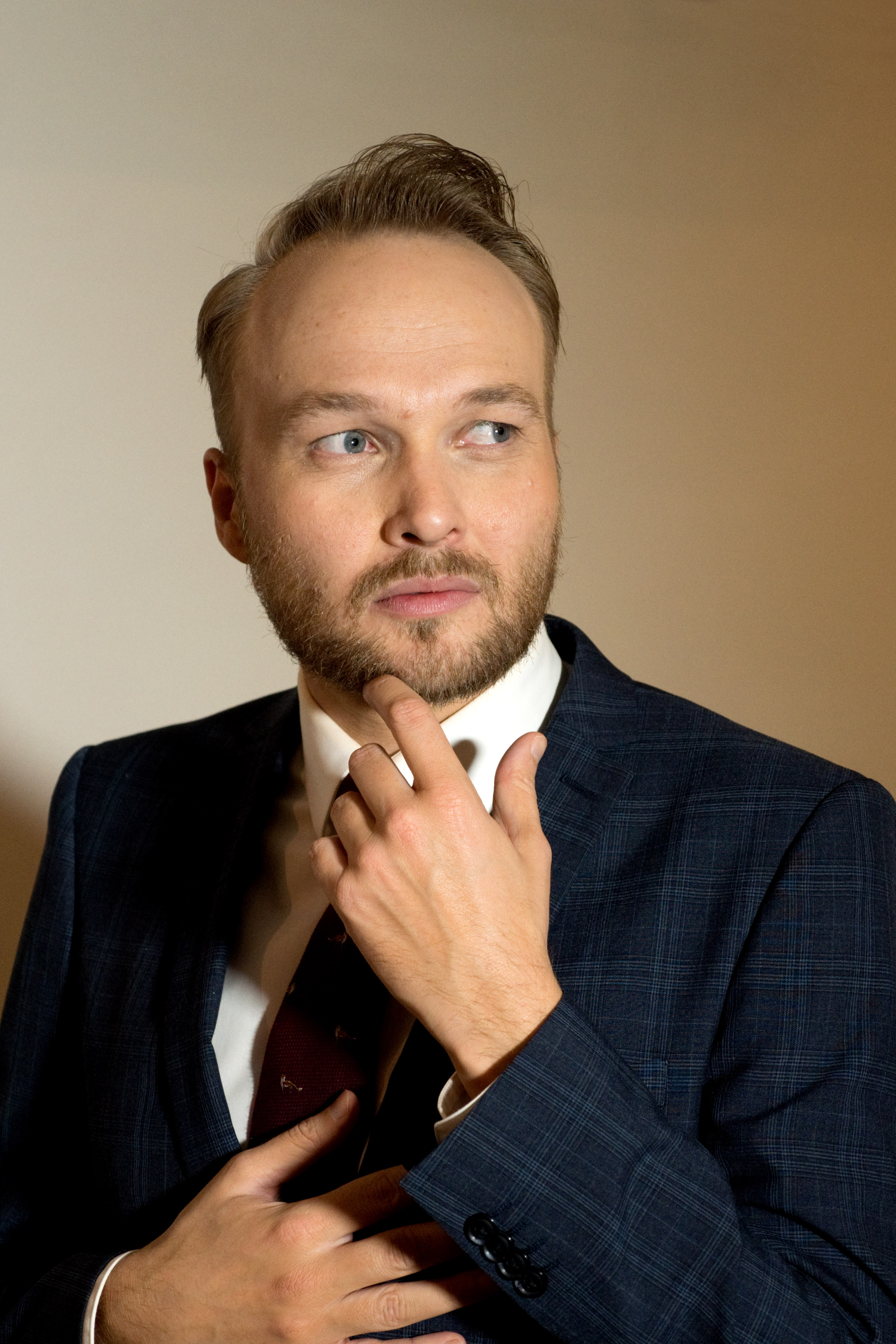
- Lubach in 2016
- Born: Arjen Henrik Lubach; 22 October 1979 (age 46); Groningen, Netherlands
- Education: University of Groningen
- Occupations: Writer, comedian, television presenter, musician
- Writing career
- Pen name: Slimme Schemer
- Arjen Lubach's voice Recorded February 2015
- Website: www.arjenlubach.nl

Arjen Henrik Lubach (Dutch pronunciation: [ˈɑrjə(n) ˈɦɛnrɪk ˈlybɑx]; born 22 October 1979) is a Dutch comedian, author, music producer and television presenter. Between 2014 and 2021 he was the host of the weekly news satire television show Zondag met Lubach ('Sunday with Lubach') on NPO 3. Between February 2022 and October 2024, he hosted his next show, De Avondshow met Arjen Lubach ('The Evening show with Arjen Lubach') on NPO 1. The day after the last episode, he announced that he, along with his whole team, would leave NPO and VPRO to transfer to RTL 4 with a new show, starting in March 2025, in January 2025 revealed to be titled Lubach. Since August 2026, he hosts a Dutch version of Taskmaster on RTL 4, together with Diederik Smit.

== Early life and education ==
Lubach was born on 22 October 1979 in a hospital in Groningen. He was raised in Lutjegast, where he lived until age 15.

Lubach's parents were both lawyers and his father was a professor at the University of Groningen. Lubach is a great-grandson of Mayor Obbe Norbruis of Schoonebeek and Zuilen (1895–1970). He and his two brothers were raised outside of Lutjegast. Lubach felt like an outsider because his family did not speak the Gronings dialect. He describes his younger self as "complex" and a "kid who stayed indoors". Although he was bullied, he considers his youth to have been enjoyable. His family was religious: the children went to the Protestant primary school School met de Bijbel ("School with the Bible") (Note: Lubach's former primary school is now called Basisschool 't Fundament, located in the Zeehaanstraat in Lutjegast, Grootegast), they prayed every day, read from the Bible (which was used to find a solution to pretty much any problem) and went to church every Sunday.

Lubach was 11 years old when his mother was diagnosed with breast cancer. She died a year later. The loss of his mother, with whom he was very close, left a great impact on him (Note: "As I later heard from my grandma, my mother recognised in me 'I understand this child'. When someone who claims she is the only one who understands you disappears, that does have an impact on your life." With the death of his mother, his faith in God and religion began to crumble.") and increased his doubts about religion. After primary school, he went to the Maartenscollege in Haren. The choice was made in part because his father had promised to raise the children religiously on his mother's deathbed.

At the Maartenscollege, Lubach met his first great love, on whom many of the fictitious characters in his later work were based. Lubach went on to study Spanish at the University of Groningen. When he lost his religion, he concluded that life was pointless, which temporarily led him into an "existential crisis". Later he decided to fill this void by developing his own personal sense of meaning. Lubach then quit his studies and worked as a taxi driver in Groningen for several months, following that by working as a harbourmaster on Vlieland. He subsequently commenced studying philosophy. During the second year, when he also studied Swedish, he met Janine Abbring. With her he made a spontaneous trip to Denmark, where they wrote their first hit single.

== Career ==
=== Writing ===
In August 2006, Lubach's debut novel Mensen die ik ken die mijn moeder hebben gekend ("People I Know Who Knew My Mother") appeared, and in April 2008 his novel Bastaardsuiker ("Brown Sugar"), both at Meulenhoff publishing. In March 2011, Lubach's new novel Lubach Magnus was published by Podium, followed by the thriller IV in 2013, which was nominated for the Gouden Strop. Furthermore, he writes for the VPRO radio, columns for CJP magazine, opinion pieces for NRC Next and scenarios for film and theatre.

Lubach worked as a freelance textwriter for radio and television, including Vara Laat, Koppensnellers and De Wereld Draait Door.

=== Theatre ===
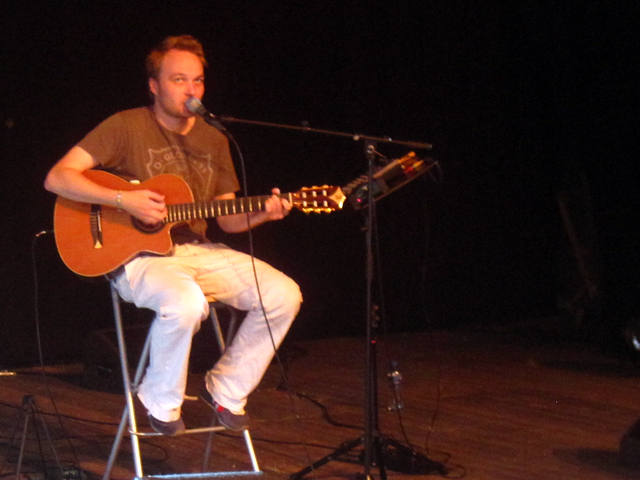
Performing with Het Monica da Silva Trio, Zwarte Cross 2010

In 2001, Lubach became part of the theatre fellowship Op Sterk Water (with Roel van Velzen and others), with whom he performed at, amongst others, Lowlands, Hard Gelach, Laughing Matters and in theatres in the Netherlands and Belgium. In June 2014, he left Op Sterk Water to present a talkshow.

In the summers of 2009, 2011 and 2013, Lubach performed together with comedian Tim Kamps at the itinerant festival De Parade with the show Het Monica da Silva Trio. In theatre season 2011 and 2012 they played their show in theatres throughout the Netherlands and Belgium.

=== Radio ===
Lubach started his radio career at OOG Radio, the local broadcasting organisation of the city of Groningen. As a volunteer, he presented a daily programme for two years.

In 2003, Lubach got a late night programme as Arjen L at 3FM, at first for the NPS and later for the VARA, and he could be heard as the sidekick of Claudia de Breij and Giel Beelen.

In 2007, Lubach did a weekly contribution for the VPRO in the radio programme De Avonden on Radio 6.

=== Internet and television ===
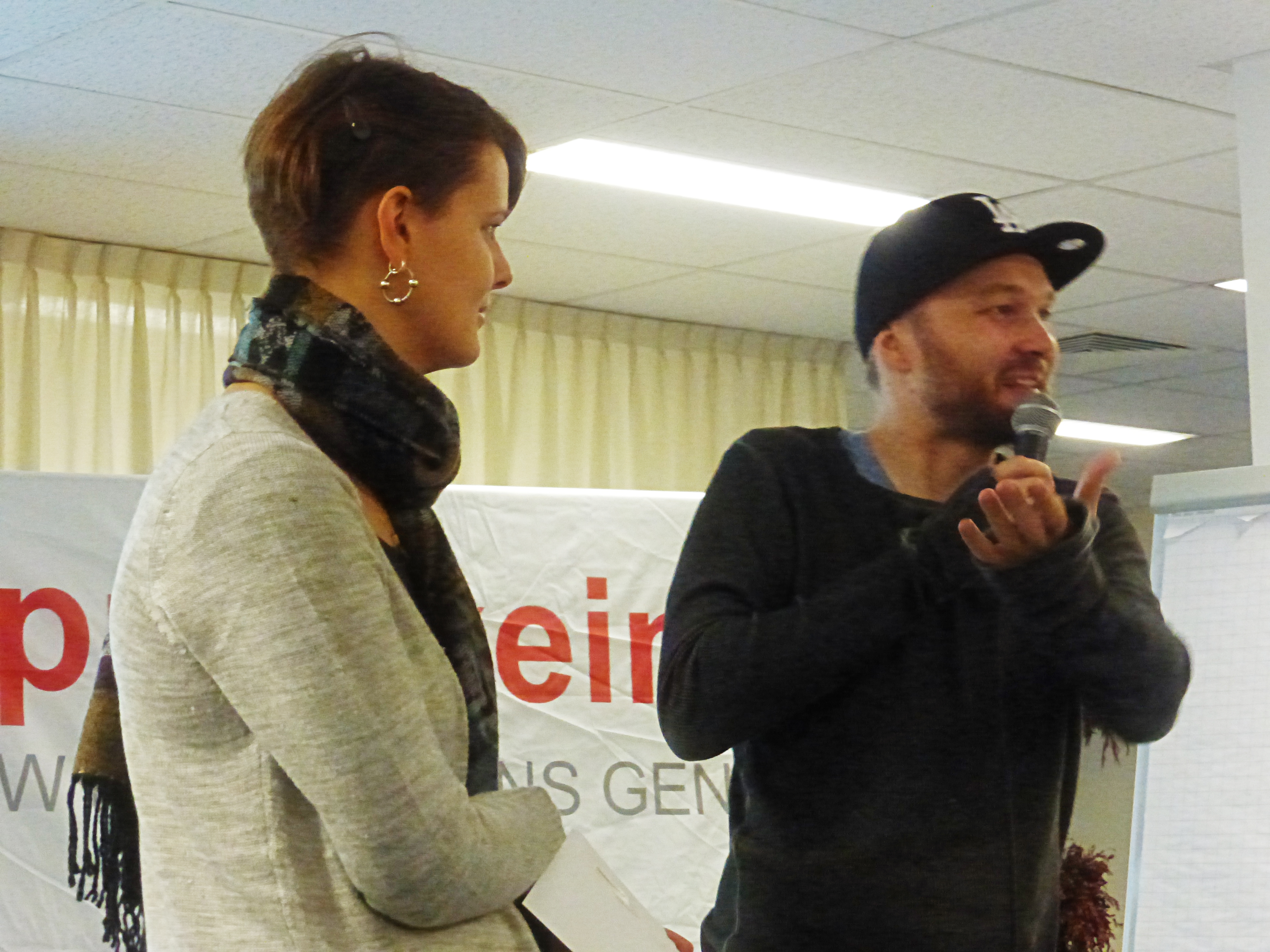
In 2015, Lubach succeeded Joanna van der Hoek (left) as Republican of the Year for satirising the Dutch monarchy

Since 2005, Lubach – together with Edo Schoonbeek and Pieter Jouke – has maintained the comedy website Buro Renkema. Some of their items were shown at Pauw & Witteman, Koppensnellers and De Wereld Draait Door. In June 2007, ABN AMRO threatened to sue them, because they created a parody of ABN AMRO online banking. The bank eventually backed off when Buro Renkema refused to take the flash video down.

Early 2007, Lubach was part of the jury in the show Lama Gezocht. From late 2007 on, he presented De Nieuwste Show for BNN from Monday till Thursday together with Patrick Lodiers. Since September 2009, Lubach and Edo Schoonbeek co-produce the "Rap service" under the name "MC T-Lex" for the AVRO show Koefnoen. Arjen Lubach participated in the TV show Wie is de Mol? in 2010, dropping out in the seventh episode. In June 2010, he and five friends founded the website Recensiekoning ("Review King"), for which he writes regularly.

For the NTR and IJswater Films, Lubach wrote the scenarios De Goudfazant ("The Golden Pheasant") and Midzomernacht ("Midsummer Night"). The latter premiered at the Netherlands Film Festival in 2011, and was shown at other film festivals in Uruguay, Brive and Leeuwarden, and was broadcast on Nederland 2 on 2 December 2011. In 2012, Lubach wrote for Talent United Films the scenario for the television film Honderden Brommers ("Hundreds of Mopeds").

On 31 August 2012, he won the finale of the television show De Slimste Mens ("The Smartest Human") against Mark Huizinga and Jan Rot.

From the 13th season of Wie is de Mol?, Lubach presents the programme MolTalk on Radio 1 and on the second screen, where he looks forward to and back on every episode of that day. In 2013, Lubach and linguist Paulien Cornelisse started a monthly language segment on De Wereld Draait Door.

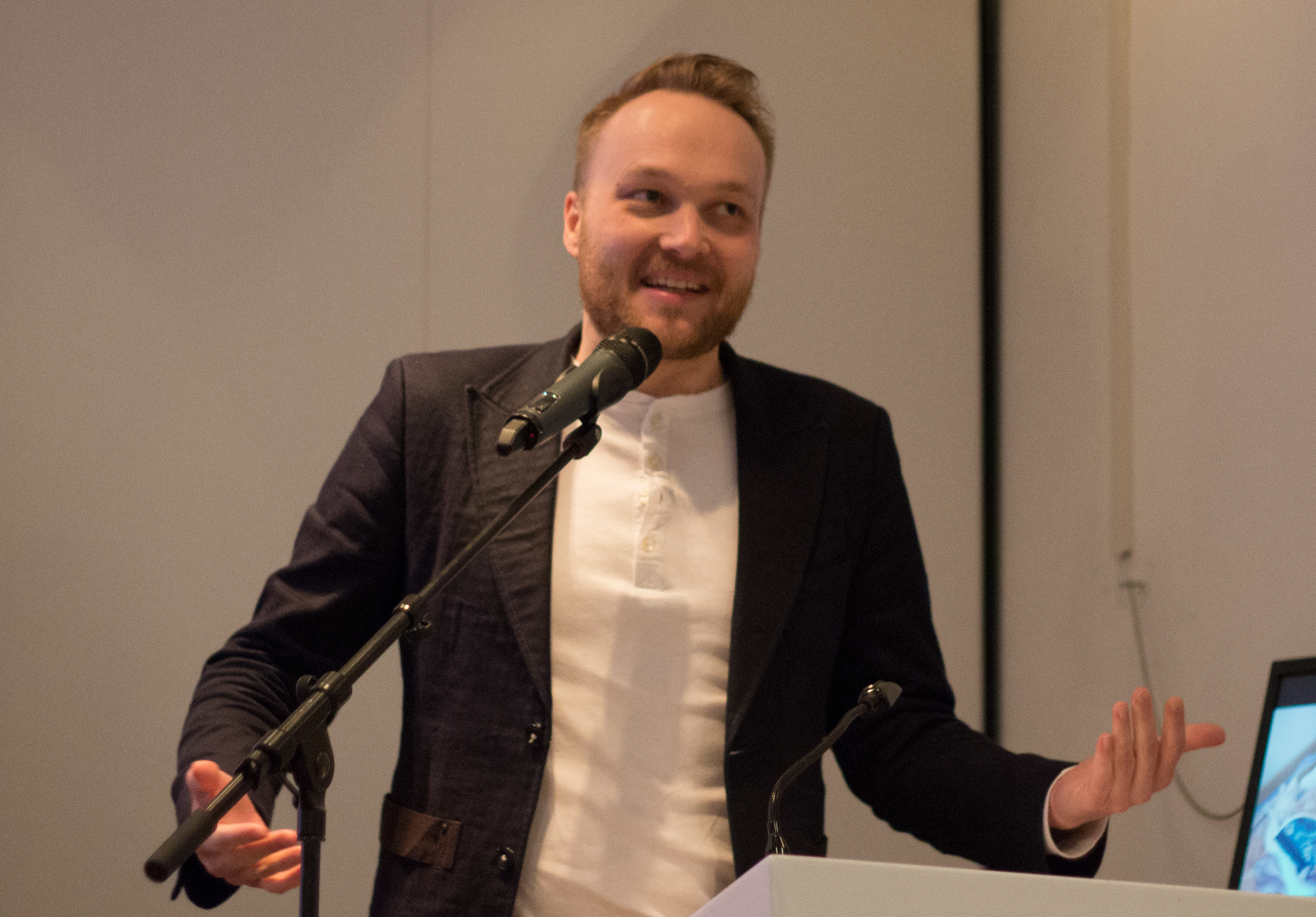
Arjen Lubach in 2015

On Sunday 9 November 2014, the first episode of Zondag met Lubach aired. It is a satirical talkshow, in which he takes a critical look at the last week's news. Because of 22 March 2015 episode in which he mocked the Dutch monarchy by proclaiming himself "Pharao of the Netherlands" and launched a citizens' initiative to confirm it, Lubach was awarded the title of Republican of the Year 2015 by the New Republican Society.

In early 2017, the Zondag met Lubach video "The Netherlands welcomes Trump in his own words" that ridiculed United States President Donald Trump while at the same time using self-mockery, went viral and was viewed more than 73 million times worldwide. It inspired the similar German late-night satirical talkshow Neo Magazin Royale of Jan Böhmermann to launch a Europe-wide video contest to let every country make its own parody video.

=== Music ===
In 2001, Lubach and Janine Abbring scored a number 3 hit under the pseudonym of Slimme Schemer ft. Tido. This song, Jelle, originated as a joke at the Noorderslag festival; it is a parody of American rapper Eminem and British singer Dido's song Stan. It is about a fan, Jelle, who disappointedly sings (in second person singular) about De Kast singer Syb van der Ploeg, blaming him for not replying to his messages.

In 2014 Kygo released a song named Firestone, which was written by Arjen Lubach and Martijn Konijnenburg, who worked on it together. The song was sold without their knowledge. In 2020 Lubach released a book (Dutch: Stoorzender), the story is described in this book.

In 2015, Lubach secretly released the song "Justified (Sunrise Funk)" under the pseudonym Hartebees, which became a hit. Radio host Domien Verschuuren discovered Lubach was the artist, because his name was listed as producer on Deezer. In July 2016 it became known that Arjen Lubach is part of a dance duo called The Galaxy. The Amsterdam-based DJ duo released their Bass Country Club EP in 2015 with the Barong Family label, which was founded by Yellow Claw. The Galaxy released their second EP, Moon & The Stars EP in late 2016.

== Views ==
Lubach described himself as "a republican to the core" and has spoken out against the Dutch monarchy. He considers belief in a God to be something remarkable and has taken an assertive position against the excesses of religion. Looking back on his own time as a believer, Lubach called it "the biggest brainwash ever. Absolute nonsense". According to him, religion gave him great feelings of guilt about living in sin. He called it "outrageous" that he was taught to pray, but he does not fault his parents. He experienced relinquishing faith as "an enormous liberation" that gave him a greater sense of calm. (Note: "When I started thinking and discovered there was no God, it did feel like an enormous liberation. That I've been thinking all this time I had to live a certain way, while actually there is no moral basis at all.") He is now an atheist.

Lubach is a vegetarian. In the Zondag met Lubach episode of 1 November 2015, he was still making fun of vegetarians, saying they overdid it, but he did argue that the population as a whole should eat less meat, primarily for environmental reasons. He then demonstratively ate a half sausage slice, and threw away the other half. During the Zondag met Lubach episode of 17 September 2017, Lubach ferociously criticised animal suffering in factory farming, recalling the 2017 fipronil eggs contamination, numerous farm fires killing hundreds of thousands of animals and mistreatment of animals in farms (particularly De Knorhof in Erichem) and slaughterhouses. He then launched a new ironic certification mark for animal-unfriendly meat, whilst commenting on "real meat": "I do not buy that shit anymore". One month later, Lubach jokingly tweeted that the "Zondag met Lubach" menu at his workplace contained many meaty dishes, wondering whether the VPRO canteen was aware he did not eat meat.

During COVID-19 pandemic in the Netherlands, he has been supportive of the Dutch government's firm position against the proposed Eurobond, blaming the citizens of Southern European countries (more specifically in this case Italy) for electing anti-austerity politicians for decades.

== Bibliography ==
- 2006: Mensen die ik ken die mijn moeder hebben gekend ("People I Know Who Knew My Mother") (novel) (ISBN 9029077506)
- 2007: De Deen ("The Dane") (theatre monologue)
- 2007: "Duizend woorden" ("A Thousand Words"), contribution to the bundle Boom (ISBN 904680366X)
- 2008: Bastaardsuiker ("Brown Sugar") (novel) (ISBN 9029077514)
- 2008: "Fasten Your Seatbelts", contribution to the collection Tygomir Scholtz (ISBN 9049900682)
- 2009: De Goudfazant ("The Golden Pheasant") (film script for NPS and IJswater Films)
- 2010: Contributions to Late avond idealen ("Late Night Ideals") (directed by Sanne Vogel) Theaterproductie Vogelfabriek
- 2010: Midzomernacht ("Midsummer Night") (film script for NPS and IJswater Films)
- 2011: Magnus (novel), Podium publishing (ISBN 9789057594281)
- 2012: Honderden Brommers ("Hundreds of Mopeds") (tv film script for NTR and Talent United Films)
- 2013: IV (thriller novel) (ISBN 9057595842)
- 2013: "Achievers", contribution to the collection Hond (ISBN 9048814359)
- 2020: Stoorzender ("Jammer") (autobiography), Podium publishing (ISBN 9789463810562)

== Awards and nominations ==
- 2001: nominated for a Top of the Pops Award, category Best Newcomer, for Jelle
- 2005: nominated for a Marconi Award, category best newcomer, for Arjen L on 3FM
- 2007: nominated for a Dutch Bloggie, category best weblog, politics & entertainment, for Buro Renkema
- 2008: nominated for a Dutch Bloggie, category politics & entertainment, for Buro Renkema
- 2008: nominated for the Halewijnprijs, for Bastaardsuiker
- 2012: longlist Gouden Boekenuil for "Magnus"
- 2012: longlist Dioraphte Jongeren Literatuurprijs for "Magnus"
- 2012: Publieksprijs Dioraphte Jongeren Literatuurprijs for "Magnus"
- 2013: nominated for the Gouden Strop, for "IV"
- 2013: won Crimezone Debuutprijs for "IV"
- 2015: Honourable mention Nipkowjury for Zondag met Lubach
- 2015: nominated for the Televizier Aanstormend Talent Award
- 2015: won Republican of the Year by the New Republican Society
- 2015: won Liberal of the Year 2015 (JOVD)
- 2016: won Zilveren Nipkowschijf for Zondag met Lubach
- 2016: won Freethinker of the Year by De Vrije Gedachte
- 2016: won Skeptic Pyramid Pendulum by Stichting Skepsis
- 2017: won the Gouden Televizierring 2017 for Zondag met Lubach
- 2018: won House of Animals awards' professional jury prize for the Zondag met Lubach item on factory farming
