= Das Duell um die Welt =

- Presented by: Jeannine Michaelsen; Joachim Winterscheidt; Klaas Heufer-Umlauf
- Country of origin: Germany
- Original language: German
- No. of seasons: 12
- No. of episodes: 33+

Joko gegen Klaas – Das Duell um die Welt (English: Joko vs. Klaas – The Battle around the World, shortened to DudW) is a German reality series, broadcast on the German television network ProSieben on prime time.

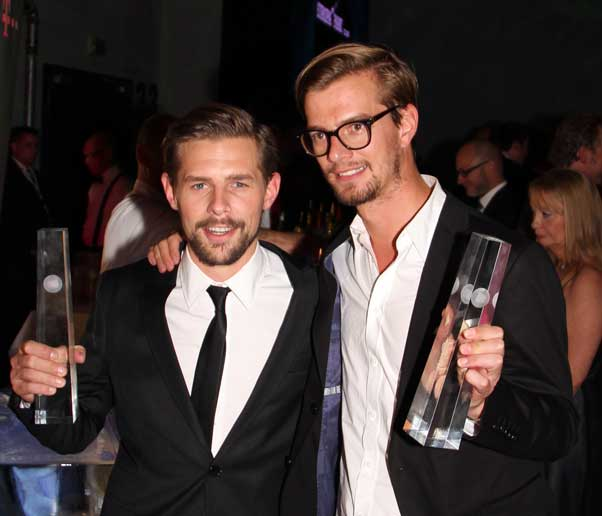
Heufer-Umlauf and Winterscheidt at the German Television Award 2012

It is a show that pins its two stars against one another in a series of challenges all over the globe. Hosts Joachim ‘Joko’ Winterscheidt and Klaas Heufer-Umlauf give each other a series of outrageous and tough challenges in countries all over the world; they know where they're going but have no idea what they will have to do until they get there. It is a travel game show and reality series where each host tries to push the other to their limits in an attempt to be crowned the "world champion" by taking on all the obstacles and coming out on top as the one who has won the battle for world domination.

In 2017, Joko and Klaas staged a prank at the Goldene Kamera awards ceremony involving a Ryan Gosling impersonator who accepted an award on behalf of the real actor.

Since the 6th season, the show was done in two teams (Team Joko and Team Klaas). Joko and Klaas sent several German celebrities from the other team to the challenges around the world. So both only did the challenge in the TV-studio.

== Broadcasts ==
=== Joko vs. Klaas ===
Season	Episode	Date	Winner	Countries Joko	Countries Klaas						
Season	Episode	Date	Winner	Countries Joko	Countries Klaas	1	1	21 July 2012	Joko	England Haggis Dinner on a plane	Russia Singing in a centrifuge
Mexico Wrestling	Japan Bagel Head					1	1	21 July 2012	Joko		
United States Animal therapy with crocodiles	China Most dangerous trail in the World					1	1	21 July 2012	Joko		
Jamaica Donkey Race	Thailand Blind Kickboxing					1	1	21 July 2012	Joko		
2	25 August 2012	Klaas	Ecuador Ayahuasca	Hong Kong Nightmare Bungee		1					
2	25 August 2012	Klaas	Belize Climb the stake	India Diving in the Ganges		1					
2	25 August 2012	Klaas	United States Eskimo olympics	South Korea Eat octopus, wire acrobatics		1					
2	25 August 2012	Klaas	United States Wheelchair rugby	Malaysia Rafting		1					
2	3	19 October 2013	Klaas	South Africa Superman for one day	Australia Catch the kangaroo						
2	3	19 October 2013	Klaas	Brazil Ayahuasca part 2	Vanuatu The Heufer						
2	3	19 October 2013	Klaas	Canada Sew up your mouth	New Zealand The dumbest is out						
2	4	30 November 2013	Joko	Ethiopia Manhood ritual	Russia Illegal photoshooting						
2	4	30 November 2013	Joko	United States Wedding in Las Vegas	China Suit of Bess						
2	4	30 November 2013	Joko	Austria Sleeping in a rockface	Bosnia and Herzegovina Caveexplorer extreme						
2	5	4 January 2014	Klaas	France Waterskiing	China O sole mio						
2	5	4 January 2014	Klaas	Austria Buried alive	Vanuatu Jungle Bungee						
2	5	4 January 2014	Klaas	Canada Earth Song Cover Song	India Bull-surfing						
3	6	6 September 2014	Klaas	England Joko as a crash test dummies for Colin Furze	Bahamas Bite by Sharks						
3	6	6 September 2014	Klaas	United States Halo Jump	Finland Ice Diving						
3	6	6 September 2014	Klaas	Jamaica Raft race	Jamaica Raft race						
3	7	25 October 2014	Joko	United States Zero G Flight	China DIY Submarine						
3	7	25 October 2014	Joko	Sweden Formula Offroad	Colombia Bulletproof Klaas						
3	7	25 October 2014	Joko	Russia Commercial spot in the Underground	India Crash a Bollywood set						
3	8	22 November 2014	Joko	Switzerland Honking on a hot-air balloon	Venezuela Angel Falls						
3	8	22 November 2014	Joko	Egypt Selfie with a Dugong	Indonesia Game Night with cannibals						
4	9	26 September 2015	Klaas	India/United States Joko's special seat	Hungary Mine Diving						
4	9	26 September 2015	Klaas	Russia Hook-bungee	Philippines Klaas in Prison						
4	9	26 September 2015	Klaas	Greenland Ice floe wrestling	Greenland Ice floe wrestling						
4	10	31 October 2015	Klaas	United States Joko high UP	Venezuela Rafting trip with waterfall						
4	10	31 October 2015	Klaas	England The golden mile	Bolivia Blasting in the silver mine						
4	10	31 October 2015	Klaas	Croatia G-Force battle	Croatia G-Force battle						
4	11	12 December 2015	Joko	United States Ultimate Tazer Ball	Thailand Karaoke on Tape						
4	11	12 December 2015	Joko	Ecuador Ayahuasca part 3	Venezuela Playing a Game						
4	11	12 December 2015	Joko	United States Human quiz bowling	United States Human quiz bowling						
5	12	9 September 2017	Klaas	Poland House blasting with bombsuit	United States Ropeswinging						
5	12	9 September 2017	Klaas	China/Hong Kong Blood sausage out of your blood	Italy Skiing on the Etna						
5	12	9 September 2017	Klaas	Nepal Hallucinogenic honey	Nepal Hallucinogenic honey						
5	13	18 November 2017	Joko	Austria Stunt helicopter	Brazil Junk meat and piranhas						
5	13	18 November 2017	Joko	Scotland Sink into the swamp	Norway Winterscheidt's 4-D cinema shows "Titanic"						
5	13	18 November 2017	Joko	Croatia Capture the flag	Croatia Capture the flag						

=== Team Joko vs. Team Klaas ===
Season	Episode	Date	Winner	Countries (Team Joko)	Countries (Team Klaas)	Team members
6	Episode 14	24. November 2018	Team Joko	Czech Republic (World's dangerous cooking show) Japan (German Schlagerstar Ralf Acapulco)	Estonia (Estonia's next Topmodel) Spain (Angel from the devil-mountain)	Team Joko: Tim Mälzer, Steven Gätjen; Team Klaas: Thomas Hayo, Palina Rojinski
6	Episode 15	1. December 2018	Team Klaas	England (Cooper's Hill Cheese-Rolling and Wake) Switzerland (Halo jump part 2)	Slovenia (Extreme ironing) Jamaica (Note: The task wasn't solved in the right way, so the audience voted if he gets the point for Jamaica) (No drugs and alcohol)	Team Joko: Thorsten Legat, Jeannine Michaelsen; Team Klaas: Johannes B. Kerner, Sido
6	Episode 16	16. February 2019	Team Joko	Latvia (Museum of failure) Indonesia (Burning questions)	China (Explosive wedding) United States (The south-state Umlaufs)	Team Joko: Lena Meyer-Landrut, Jared Hasselhoff; Team Klaas: Clueso, Jochen Schropp
7	Episode 17	31. August 2019	Team Klaas	Russia (Hook-bungee part 2) Portugal (Puke-ship)	Nigeria (Bachelor in Nollywood) South Africa (Wild-life hotel)	Team Joko: Charlotte Roche, Max Giesinger; Team Klaas: Paul Janke, Tom & Bill Kaulitz
7	Episode 18	5. October 2019	Team Klaas	Poland (Drinkin games in the horror house) Mexico (Explosive hammer festival)	Switzerland (How to land a hot air balloon) Norway (Frozen meets ice-diving)	Team Joko: H. P. Baxxter, Mario Basler; Team Klaas: Edin Hasanović, Jeannine Michaelsen
7	Episode 19	30. November 2019	Team Klaas	Belize (Great Blue Hole KLAASino) Italy (Soccer-juggling on a mountain)	France / Hungary (Blind bungee jump in Hungary) Taiwan (Comedy Street Taiwan)	Team Joko: Marteria, Thorsten Legat; Team Klaas: Sophia Thomalla, Simon Gosejohann
8	Episode 20	28. November 2020	Team Joko	Greece (Bunkerbacke) Italy (Duct tape swinging)	Czech Republic (The human banner ad) Iceland (Glacier Unplugged Concert)	Team Joko: Ralf Moeller, Janin Ullmann; Team Klaas: Luke Mockridge, Wincent Weiss
8	Episode 21	5. December 2020	Team Joko	Liechtenstein / Unknown (Note: The task was announced in Liechtenstein but due to legality problems, the contestant travelled to an unknown country which was not allowed to be named) (The smallest task of the world) Russia (Siberian Power Show)	Norway (Whale tiktok) Switzerland (Circus Roquaeli)	Team Joko: Axel Stein, Thorsten Legat; Team Klaas: Vanessa Mai, Fabian Hambüchen
8	Episode 22	26. February 2021	Team Klaas	Switzerland (Magnet shoe test) United States / Germany (Hawaii music video in Paderborn)	Poland (Smallest escape room of the world) Latvia (Art of consumer behavior or Eat yourself)	Team Joko: Stefanie Giesinger, Axel Bosse; Team Klaas: Jan Köppen, Micky Beisenherz
9	Episode 23	4. December 2021	Team Klaas	Mexico (The burning parachute) Austria / Liechtenstein (In the flamethrower inferno)	Croatia (Note: The task was cancelled due to safety reasons) (The Tenet jump) Sweden (Drive into the Ocean)	Team Joko: Axel Stein, Nikeata Thompson; Team Klaas: Michi Beck, Lucy Diakovska
9	Episode 24	11. December 2021	Team Joko	Spain (Digital Detox) Malta (Wracken music festival 2021)	Latvia (Test of courage with a wrecking ball) Netherlands (The world biggest Cannabis cookie)	Team Joko: Jens Knossalla, Johannes Strate; Team Klaas: Linda Zervakis, Tommi Schmitt
9	Episode 25	7. May 2022	Team Joko	United States (crossbow crossfire) Greenland (Water skiing in the polar sea)	United States (The audio book) Mexico (the Mexican batcave)	Team Joko: Kevin Großkreutz, Riccardo Simonetti; Team Klaas: Johannes Oerding, Collien Ulmen-Fernandes
10	Episode 26	26. December 2022	Team Joko	France (Mountain of Hell Downhill race) Scotland (The Highland Fling Piercing Marionette)	Sweden (The Icebreaker ice café) Mexico (The Peyote cactus drug trip)	Team Joko: Sven Hannawald, Dennis and Benni Wolter Team Klaas: Verona Pooth, Sophie Passmann
10	Episode 27	11. February 2023	Team Klaas	United States (Sky surfing) Thailand (vacuum cleaner superhero)	India (Wall of Death) Northern Ireland (Sheep dung spitting in Irvinestown)	Team Joko: Dunja Hayali, Patrick Owomoyela Team Klaas: Alexander Klaws, Oliver Polak
10	Episode 28	18. March 2023	Team Klaas	Spain (HAPPY BIRTHDAY) Netherlands (The Yes woman and the 3h rollercoaster ride in Slagharen)	Norway (Act like a dumbass on national TV) Poland (Nicht nachmachen Reloaded)	Team Joko: Nilam Farooq, Jessica Schwarz Team Klaas: Sasha, Wigald Boning
11	Episode 29	7. October 2023	Team Joko	Switzerland (Making a tattoo whilst sitting on a plane) Indonesia (Taking part in a local funeral ritual)	Switzerland (Singing a song whilst hanging a in car only held by two telephone books) United States (Reverse Bungee Jump)	Team Joko: Nura, Nadja Benaissa Team Klaas: Elevator Boys, Daniel Fehlow
11	Episode 30	28. October 2023	Team Joko	United States (Stuntman showreel) Austria (Shoot at yourself with the protection of 100 t-shirts)	France (Médoc wine marathon)	Team Joko: René Adler, Axel Stein Team Klaas: Jakob Lundt
11	Episode 31	10.February 2024	Team Joko	England (Retrieve a ball from a water cave) Greece (Firework crossfire on Chios)	Italy (hiking with humor) Romania (Eat a Berliner with your own blood)	Team Joko: Andrea Petkovic, Michael Mittermeier Team Klaas: Hazel Brugger, Wayne Carpendale
12	Episode 32	19. October 2024	Team Klaas	Japan ( Naked Men Festival) England (worst comedy gig of all time)	Poland (The meanest quiz of all time - "I promptly forgot the answer" Extreme) India (Indian Stuntshow)	Team Joko: Ski Aggu, Nina Chuba Team Klaas: Tobi Krell, Oliver Kalkofe
12	Episode 34	26. October 2024	Team Klaas	Thailand (Vegetarian festival) Austria (Trust the physics)	Italy (Power Hymn from a weather simulation chamber) France (Tandem wingsuit)	Team Joko: Timon Krause, Papaplatte Team Klaas: Nico Santos, Gülcan Kamps
12	Episode 35	18. January 2025	Team Joko	Poland (The next Houdini) Slovenia (Mountain bike trip through a dark mine)	Latvia (Rollerman in Sigulda) Japan (bloody hell tourist trip through tokyo)	Team Joko: Wilson Gonzalez Ochsenknecht, Katrin Bauerfeind Team Klaas: Felix Kroos, Christoph "Icke" Dommisch

== Links ==
https://www.prosieben.de/tv/das-duell-um-die-welt-joko-gegen-klaas
