= 7 vs. Wild =

German YouTube and Freevee survival show

- Genre: Reality; Survival
- Developed by: Fritz Meinecke
- Country of origin: Germany
- Original language: German
- No. of seasons: 5
- No. of episodes: 73 + 1

Production
- Executive producers: Fritz Meinecke, Johannes Hovekamp, Maximilian Kovacs, CaliVision Network
- Running time: 45–100 minutes

Original release
- Network: YouTube
- Release: 6 November 2021 – present
- Network: Amazon Freevee
- Release: 31 October 2023 – present

7 vs. Wild is a German reality TV-show invented by YouTuber Fritz Meinecke and his team. The series, which is released on YouTube and Amazon Freevee, follows the experiences of 7 or 14 YouTubers who have to survive in the wilderness for 7 or 14 days.

They are only allowed to take seven preselected items with them and the clothing they wear. The participants have to persevere isolation and the moods of nature.

Season	Year	Duration	Participants	Country	Temperature (night/day)	Spot selection
1	2021	7 days	7 (7 single)	Sweden	5...10 °C / 10...20 °C	Scandtrack
2	2022	7 days	7 (7 single)	Panama	20...25 °C / 30...35 °C, high humidity	Wandermut
3	2023	14 days	14 (7 pairs) (knew partner before)	Canada	0...10 °C / 5...15 °C	SK Touristik
4	2024	14 days	7 (group of 7) (didn't know each other before)	New Zealand	−7...+5 °C / 0...15 °C, frost and snow	OrgaTeam itself
5	2025	14 days	7 (group of 7) (didn't know each other before)	Colombia		

Interactive maps with all playgrounds of the four seasons

== Season 1 (2021) ==
Season 1
Location	Shore of Lake Naren, County Dalarna/Värmland, Sweden
Year	2021
Episodes	16
Broadcast	YouTube, Wed+Sat 18:00 CET, 6 Nov – 29 Dec 2021
Production	Johannes Hovekamp, Maximilian Kovacs
Editors	Johannes Hovekamp, Maximilian Kovacs
Camera	Johannes Hovekamp, Maximilian Kovacs, participants itself

The first season took place at the end of August 2021. The 16 episodes were published from the beginning of November to the end of December 2021 on the Meinecke's YouTube channel.

=== Concept ===
The seven participants with varying degrees of experience in bush crafting, camping and outdoor activities were dropped off into an unspecified lake in Sweden. After swimming to the shore each participant was allowed to move 500 meters in each direction along the lake and as far as they wanted into the mainland. According to the rules they were allowed to take seven items with them, clothing not counted. The clothes, were predetermined by their use (e.g. T-shirt, gloves, headgear, buff, warming layer, socks, shoes).

The aim of the series is to survive in the wild and in complete human isolation. This includes activities such as: searching for food, building or finding a shelter and a place to sleep, passing of prepared tasks (for points) and filming them. Thanks to the location on a lakeshore the water supply and the possibility to fish are guaranteed. All the participants have access to a sealed first aid kit, a sealed mobile phone, a GPS transmitter and the technical equipment for filming.

In the first episode the competition rules, participants and the items chosen in each case were presented. Subsequent episodes showed the participants' recordings, which lasted approximately half a day per episode, with the length of the segments per participant depending on the quantity and quality of the material provided. From the time of elimination the participants are no longer shown at least in the main part of the show, even if they decide to remain on the filming site.

The participants are obliged to daily confirm their well-being by pressing the dead man's switch. Should they fail to do it, they are eliminated and picked up. In addition, the participants have to open a sealed envelope containing a daily challenge. Participation in these tasks is voluntary, but points can be earned by participating, which plays a role in determining the overall winner.

The use of the cell phone carried for emergencies only, will result in direct elimination of the participant, and the use of materials from the first aid kit will be sanctioned with point deductions.

The winner is the participant who stays in the game the longest. If more than one participant remains in the game until the end, the winner is the one who achieves the highest score in the challenges. They will be awarded a 10,000 euro prize, which is donated to a charity organization of their choice.

=== Participants and their selected items and Locations in Season 1 ===
The seven participants were released in this relay in central Sweden between Hagfors and Vansbro on the 12 km^{2} Lake Naren (60.24°N 13.83°E).

Participant	Selectable Items																Location of Release
Participant	tools				source of fire		storage and accessories					outdoor kitchen		other		Number of pieces	Location of Release
Participant	Knife	Saw	Hatchet	Kukri	Fire striker	Lighter	Sleeping bag	Tarp tent	Parachute cord	Hammock	Plastic tarpaulin	Pot	Filter w. bottle	Fishing kit	Hygiene kit	Number of pieces	Location of Release
Fritz Meinecke				✓	✓		✓	✓	✓			✓		✓		7	60.2726°N 13.8249°E
Martin "Survival Mattin" Rudloff	✓					✓	✓			✓	✓		✓	✓		7	60.2178°N 13.8340°E
David "Dave" Henrichs	✓	✓				✓	✓	✓				✓			✓	7	60.2638°N 13.8121°E
Niklas "Niklas on fire" Röder	✓	✓			✓		✓	✓	✓			✓				7	60.2135°N 13.8505°E
Pascal "Bommel" Bommert			✓		✓		✓	✓	✓	✓		✓				7	60.2554°N 13.8341°E
Fabio Schäfer	✓				✓											2	60.2273°N 13.8558°E
Christian "Reloadiak" Nosty	✓	✓			✓		✓					✓		✓	✓	7	60.2437°N 13.8414°E

=== Episode overview and the Challenges ===
Episode	Day	Title	Release (2021) (18:00)	Challenge	Scores						
Episode	Day	Title	Release (2021) (18:00)	Challenge	Fritz	Mattin	Chris	Fabio	Bommel	Dave	Niklas
1		The Start	6 Nov	no challenge							
2	1	The Exposure	10 Nov	Swim from the boat to the shore shortest time [min]	3 pt 5:01	4 pt 4:55	2 pt 5:03	6 pt 3:57	5 pt 4:17	7 pt 3:07	1 pt 5:24
3	1	The Decisions	13 Nov	Swim from the boat to the shore shortest time [min]	3 pt 5:01	4 pt 4:55	2 pt 5:03	6 pt 3:57	5 pt 4:17	7 pt 3:07	1 pt 5:24
4	2	Bear Terrain	17 Nov	Craft a torch longest burning time [min]	7 pt 59:48	3 pt 1:42	5 pt 2:45	6 pt 7:18	4 pt 2:22		
5	2	Fatal Torch Mistakes	20 Nov	Craft a torch longest burning time [min]	7 pt 59:48	3 pt 1:42	5 pt 2:45	6 pt 7:18	4 pt 2:22		
6	3	Objects Submitted	24 Nov	Submit objects until the end of the seven days	13 pt	–	–	13 pt	2 pt		
7	3	Consequential Submission	27 Nov	Submit objects until the end of the seven days	13 pt	–	–	13 pt	2 pt		
8	4	Night Rescue	1 Dec	Drill a fire	–	–	–	–	dropped out 💧		
9	4	Mental Decay	4 Dec	Drill a fire	–	–	–	–	dropped out 💧		
10	5	Crafting Rafts	8 Dec	Craft a raft	7 pt	–	–	–	dropped out 💧		
11	5	Broken Seal	11 Dec	Craft a raft	7 pt	–	–	–	dropped out 💧		
12	6	Mindset against Forces of Nature	15 Dec	Alternative sources of food (Insects and worms)	7 pt	1 pt	–		dropped out 💧		
13	6	New Projects	18 Dec	Alternative sources of food (Insects and worms)	7 pt	1 pt	–		dropped out 💧		
14	7	The Final Challenge	22 Dec	Stacking stones highest stack [cm]	5 pt 154	6 pt 155	7 pt 190		dropped out 💧		
15	2−7	Niklas' 7 Days	25 Dec	no challenge					dropped out 💧		
16	8	The Grand Final	29 Dec	no challenge					dropped out 💧		
				Final scores [points]	42	14	14	(25)	(11)	(7)	(1)
				Final positions	1st	2nd		4th	5th	6th	7th

=== Winner ===
With 42 points, Fritz Meinecke was the winner of the first season. The prize of 10,000 euros was donated to Robert Marc Lehmann's project Mission Erde. Chris and Mattin shared the second place due to the same score. The following places were determined by the date of elimination.

=== Reception ===
The aired episodes have an average of over four million views. The Stuttgarter Nachrichten announced the start of the series.

After the series' launch, the youth radio program of the SWR (the Southwest Broadcasting is a regional public broadcasting cooperation serving the southwest of Germany) DASDING wrote: "The survival format '7 vs. Wild' is going through the roof on YouTube right now." Web video producer MontanaBlack stated that, "it's one of the most hyped formats ever on YouTube." The news portal Watson (a Swiss news portal) called the series "brilliant".

The episodes also received attention due to "live reactions" from popular streamers such as Simon Unge, Jens Knossalla and Rezo. Additionally, some of the participants responded to the episodes by providing additional background information, such as from Fritz Meinecke.

== Season 2 (2022) ==
Season 2
Location	Coast of Isla San José (Pacific Ocean), Panama
Year	2022
Episodes	16
Broadcast	YouTube, Wed+Sat 18:00 CET, 5 Nov – 28 Dec 2022
Production	Johannes Hovekamp, Maximilian Kovacs
Editors	Johannes Hovekamp, Maximilian Kovacs, Patrick Gillitzer, Rico Davies
Camera	Patrick Gillitzer, Johannes Hovekamp, Maximilian Kovacs, David Henrichs, participants itself
Graphics	Rico Davies

The second season of 7 vs. Wild was published each Wednesday and Saturday on YouTube. It is accompanied by the behind-the-scenes videos on Dave's channel.

=== Participants with their selected items and Locations in Season 2 ===
The game took place at 7 different locations on Isla San José (8.27°N 79.11°W) in the Pacific Ocean in Panama.

Participant	cancel- lation	Selectable Items												Number of pieces	Location of Release
Participant	cancel- lation	Knife	Saw	Machete	Hatchet	Fire striker	Hammock	Bivouac sack	Mosquito net	Parachute cord	Pot	Filter w. bottle	7 Cigarettes	Number of pieces	Location of Release
Antonia "Starletnova"	Day 2				✓	✓		✓				✓		4	8.2987°N 79.1275°W
Sabrina Outdoor	Day 4	✓	✓			✓					✓			4	8.3097°N 79.1018°W
Fritz Meinecke	completed			✓										1	8.2270°N 79.1271°W
Jens "Knossi" Knossalla	completed	✓				✓	✓		✓	✓		✓	✓	7	8.3120°N 79.1181°W
Sascha Huber	completed			✓		✓	✓			✓		✓		5	8.3032°N 79.0953°W
Ottogerd "Otto Bulletproof" Karasch	completed			✓										1	8.2833°N 79.1255°W
Joris (wildcarder)	completed			✓		✓					✓			3	8.2892°N 79.0857°W

=== Episodes ===
Episode	Day	Title	Release (2022) (18:00)	Challenge	Scores						
Episode	Day	Title	Release (2022) (18:00)	Challenge	Otto	Joris	Fritz	Knossi	Sascha	Sabrina	Nova
1	1	The Exposure (Die Aussetzung)	5 Nov	Search for souvenirs							
2	1	Deadly paradise (Tödliches Paradies)	9 Nov	Search for souvenirs							
3	1	Naked through the jungle (Nackt durch den Dschungel)	12 Nov	Search for souvenirs							
4	2	The first night (Die erste Nacht)	16 Nov	Bow and arrow longest distance [m]	7 pt 6.4	6 pt 5.0	6 pt 5.0	4 pt 0.2	5 pt 2.5	– –	– –
5	2	Fritz gives up (Fritz am Ende)	19 Nov	Bow and arrow longest distance [m]	7 pt 6.4	6 pt 5.0	6 pt 5.0	4 pt 0.2	5 pt 2.5	– –	– –
6	3	Crocodile at the camp (Krokodil am Lager)	23 Nov	Nature photographer	7 pt	7 pt	5 pt	6 pt	5 pt	2 pt	3 pt
7	3	The Jungle cries (Der Dschungel weint)	26 Nov	Nature photographer	7 pt	7 pt	5 pt	6 pt	5 pt	2 pt	3 pt
8	3	Flooded shelters (Überflutete Shelter)	30 Nov								
9	4	Code Yellow (Code Yellow)	3 Dec								
10	4	Restart (Neustart)	7 Dec								
10	5	Restart (Neustart)	7 Dec								
11	5	Broken (Gebrochen)	10 Dec								
12	5	Crocodile area (Krokodilgebiet)	14 Dec								
13	6	Rescue on day 6 (Rettung an Tag 6)	17 Dec								
14	6	I'm coming home (Ich komme heim)	21 Dec								
14	7	I'm coming home (Ich komme heim)	21 Dec								
15	7	Pirates! (Piraten!)	24 Dec								
16	8	King of the Jungle (King of the Jungle)	28 Dec								

== Season 3 (2023) ==
Season 3
Location	Coast of Nigei/Hope Island, British Columbia, Canada
Year	2023
Episodes	16 + 1
Broadcast	Amazon: Tue+Fri 00:00 CET, 31 Oct 2023 – 22 Dec 2023; YouTube: Wed+Sat 18:00 CET, 29 Nov 2023 – 24 Jan 2024
Production	CaliVision Network
Editors	Max Kovacs, Johannes Hovekamp, Fritz Meinecke
Camera	Patrick Gillitzer, participants itself

Season 3 took place in August/September 2023 in the Canadian province of British Columbia on Hope and Nigei Island (50.91°N 127.85°W). This season brought rule changes compared to seasons 1 and 2. The duration of the season was extended from 7 days to 14 days. In this season, participants competed in teams of two, not with a set number of items, but with what they could fit into a predefined bottle. In the preparation and announcement phase of the season, the management nominated presenters Joko Winterscheidt and Klaas Heufer-Umlauf, among others, who declined to take part.

The season was released between 31 October and 22 December 2023 on Amazon (Amazon Prime Video and ad-financed Amazon Freevee) and four weeks later on YouTube. An additional 17th bonus episode (Joey alone in the forest) was released on 24 January 2024.

=== Participants and Locations of Season 3 ===
Participant	cancel- lation	Location of release
"Survival Mattin" Rudloff and Fritz Meinecke	Day 3	50.9355°N 127.9224°W
"Naturensöhne": Gerrit Rösel and Andreas "Andy" Schulze	Day 5	50.8969°N 127.9094°W
Joey Kelly and Jan "Jan Schlappen" Lange	Day 7	50.9340°N 127.8648°W
Maximilian "Trymacs" Stemmler and Wieland Emilian "Rumathra" Welte	Day 10	50.9192°N 127.9715°W
Kevin "Papaplatte" Teller and Dominik "Reeze" Reezmann	completed	50.9118°N 127.8423°W
Jens "Knossi" Knossalla and Sascha Huber	completed	50.9041°N 127.7722°W
Hannah Assil and Ann-Kathrin "Affe auf Bike" Bendixen (wildcarder)	completed	50.9073°N 127.7343°W

Location of the Orgateam Basecamp: 50.8986°N 127.8565°W
Hotel: Malei Island Resort 50.9111°N 127.7468°W

=== Episodes ===
Episode	Day	Title	Release (2023)	
Episode	Day	Title	Amazon (00:00)	YouTube (18:00)
1	1	The Exposure (Die Aussetzung)	31 Oct	29 Nov
2	1	Wolf territory (Wolfsgebiet)	3 Nov	2 Dec
3	2	The First night (Die erste Nacht)	7 Nov	6 Dec
4	2	Construction work begins (Die Bauarbeiten beginnen)	10 Nov	9 Dec
5	3	Storm tide (Sturmflut)	14 Nov	13 Dec
6	3	1st Cancellation (Der 1. Abbruch)	17 Nov	16 Dec
7	3	Mental low (Mentaler Tiefpunkt)	21 Nov	20 Dec
8	4	Mission: Food (Mission: Nahrung)	24 Nov	23 Dec
9	4	??? (Maloche im Schacht)	28 Nov	27 Dec
10	5	Banquet (Festmahl)	1 Dec	30 Dec
11	6	Secret Weapon (Geheimwaffe)	5 Dec	3 Jan '24
12	7	Crisis meeting (Krisengespräch)	8 Dec	6 Jan '24
12	8	Crisis meeting (Krisengespräch)	8 Dec	6 Jan '24
13	8	Abandoned settlement (Verlassene Siedlung)	12 Dec	10 Jan '24
13	9	Abandoned settlement (Verlassene Siedlung)	12 Dec	10 Jan '24
14	10	The Move (Der Umzug)	15 Dec	13 Jan '24
15	11−13	Final projects (Die letzten Projekte)	19 Dec	17 Jan '24
16	14−15	Pick-up (Die Abholung)	22 Dec	20 Jan '24
17	7−15	Joey alone in the forest (Joey allein im Wald)		24 Jan '24

== Season 4 (2024) ==
Season 4
Location	near Lindis Pass, Wanaka, Region Otago, New Zealand
Year	2024
Episodes	16
Broadcast	Amazon: Tue+Fri 00:00 CE(S)T, 1 Oct – 22 Nov 2024; YouTube: Mon+Thu 18:00 CE(S)T, 14 Oct – 5 Dec 2024
Production	CaliVision Network
Editors	Max Kovacs, Johannes Hovekamp, Fritz Meinecke

The fourth season was planned for fall/winter 2024. However, the realisation and filming had already been completed at the time of the announcement. Despite the secrecy, there was speculation about filming and participants for a new season at the beginning of May, as several potential participants signed off for three weeks at exactly the same time. The participants were announced on August 27, 2024; inquiries as to whether they would accept participation were obsolete at this point, which caused some confusion. The exact location on site was found by fans of the series using the elevation profile and a few pictures within about an hour. Preparation work began in November 2023 and filming of the season took place in May 2024.

The season will be/was released between 1 October and 22 November 2024 on Amazon (Amazon Prime Video and ad-financed Amazon Freevee) and two weeks later on YouTube.

=== Participants ===
After a briefing in Frankfurt, the participants traveled to Christchurch via Singapore on scheduled flights. From there they continued with a chartered Cessna 208 Caravan to Wanaka. The last 30 km to the drop-off point were flown in three Airbus Helicopters H125, with the participants blinded with goggles. The journey was non-stop without overnight stays, the time zone difference is 10 hours (CEST UTC+0200 → NZT UTC+1200), the participants were dropped off in the afternoon when they were overtired.

Participant	Day of cancellation
Stefan "SurvivalDeutschland"; Hinkelmann	Day 4: Code Yellow, voluntary due to social conflicts
Hugo "LetsHugo" Goedert	Day 6: Code Red, health issues
Sandra "selfiesandra" Safiulov	Day 8: Code Yellow, health issues
Johannes Vogel	completed
Joey Kelly	completed
Uwe "Flying Uwe" Schüder	completed
Julia "Julia Beautx" Willecke	completed

=== Video Episodes ===
Episode	Day	Title	Release (2024)	
Episode	Day	Title	Amazon (00:00)	YouTube (18:00)
1	1	Crash (Der Absturz)	1 Oct	14 Oct
2	2	Freezing temperatures (Minusgrade)	4 Oct	17 Oct
3	2	Harder than expected (Härter als gedacht)	8 Oct	21 Oct
4	3	Group dynamics (Gruppendynamik)	11 Oct	24 Oct
5	4	Overheated conversations (Hitzige Gespräche)	15 Oct	28 Oct
6	4	The decision (Die Entscheidung)	18 Oct	31 Oct
7	5	First Food (Erste Nahrung)	22 Oct	4 Nov
8	6	Persevere (Durchhalten)	25 Oct	7 Nov
9	7	CODE RED (CODE RED)	29 Oct	11 Nov
10	8	Weather changes (Wetterumbruch)	1 Nov	14 Nov
11	8	CODE YELLOW (CODE YELLOW)	5 Nov	18 Nov
12	9	Shelter completed (Shelterbau abgeschlossen)	8 Nov	21 Nov
13	10	Snow society (Schneegesellschaft)	12 Nov	25 Nov
14	11	3 days left (Noch 3 Tage)	15 Nov	28 Nov
14	12	3 days left (Noch 3 Tage)	15 Nov	28 Nov
15	12	Battle with the summit (Kampf mit dem Gipfel)	19 Nov	2 Dec
15	13	Battle with the summit (Kampf mit dem Gipfel)	19 Nov	2 Dec
16	14	...	22 Nov	5 Dec
16	15	...	22 Nov	5 Dec

=== Behind the Scenes ===
No	Release	Title translated	content
1	1 Oct	The journey begins	Briefing and introduction of the candidates
2	8 Oct	Once around the world into the unknown	Travel from Frankfurt to New Zealand
3	15 Oct	That's how the plane crashed!	On-site crushing of the Dornier Do 28A-1
4	22 Oct	Autumn season becomes winter season - candidates' exposure	Orgateams last days before the exposure
5	12 Nov	Scouting in New Zealand	Selection of the playing ground
6	19 Nov	Stefan's Code Yellow - The day after the fire	Stefan's giving up and Pick-up
7	26 Nov	Hugo's Code Red	Hugo's dramatic health issues and Pick-up
8	3 Dec	Sandra's Code Yellow	Sandra's giving up and Pick-up
9	10 Dec		
10	17 Dec		
11	24 Dec		
12	31 Dec		

=== Audio Podcast (contains also season 3 contents) ===
Since the start of season 4 in 2024, for the first time there has been a podcast for the series in which various protagonists from the previous seasons have their say. The podcast is hosted by Steven Gätjen.

No	Title	Run- time	Release (2024)
0	Trailer 7 vs. Wild – Der Podcast	2′ 20″	1 Oct
1	Fritz Meinecke – Teil 1 von 2	57′ 30″	14 Oct
2	Fritz Meinecke – Teil 2 von 2	43′ 02″	21 Oct
3	Ann-Kathrin Bendixen – Affe auf Bike	51′ 24″	28 Oct
4	Flying Uwe aka Uwe Schüder	67′ 35″	4 Nov
5	Joe Vogel	68′ 52″	11 Nov
6	Hugo aka LetsHugo	50′ 41″	18 Nov
7	Survival Mattin	72′ 24″	25 Nov
8	The Team - Editing, Camera, Community	58′ 33″	2 Dec

=== The game ===
For the first time, the participants did not know where (continent, country) and how (singles, doubles, group) they would be exposed. They only found out the country from Singapore onwards. They learned the local conditions and the game mode directly at the drop-off point. With temperatures well below zero at night and sometimes only slightly above zero during the day, this season was climatically more challenging than the previous seasons.

There were numerous useful items on the plane, such as sleeping bags and flares. There were also cigarettes lying around, but the smokers overlooked them (The cigarettes were in a box of blister plasters). There were also 6 suitcases scattered around the site, which could be found either by chance or by scattered clues ("radio messages" on compact cassettes in the letterbox). These contained other useful items, such as saws, toothbrushes, knives, dog food, peanuts and chocolate, as well as less useful items intended for improvisation.

"Radio messages" and suitcases
Msg	Day	Case	Aerial	Tools and Food	Coordinates
1	1	Women's case	700 m	Toothbrush, toothpaste, 1½ matches, 3 knives, small pack peanuts	
2	?	Tool case	600 m	String, 2 saws, fishing line, adhesive tape, fire steel	
3	?	Surprise backpack	900 m	Stool, slingshot, 7 goggles, ashtray, camo make-up, dog food	
4	?	Hawaiian suitcase	900 m	Neck pillow, ukulele, plate, shirt, red wine, 250 g chocolate	
5	8	Hunting backpack	900 m	Bow and 6 arrow	
6	10	Military backpack	1300 m	2 useless large stones, 2 gaiters, 2 sunglasses, 2 underpants, glove, shoe polish, shirt, leggings, hip flask, 24h emergency rations	
7	14	Evaculation plan	5000 m – remaining participants –		

The exchange point for memory cards, technology and information about the location of the cases on compact cassettes was a mounted letterbox. Each participant was required to carry a medipack (which no one did) and a GPS tracker, and there was also a satellite phone for emergencies.

=== Locations of Season 4 ===
The relay was carried out on the South Island of New Zealand and filmed near Wanaka. The release took place in late autumn (southern hemisphere) between 10 and 25 May 2024 for the first time as a group. It was modelled on the crash of the Uruguayan Air Force Flight 571, with an aircraft wreck of a Dornier Do 28A-1 serving as the backdrop.

Location of the organisation team in Wanaka
The main base was Wanaka Hotel (44.6947°S 169.13671°E) at an altitude of 285 m, about 50 minutes away from the Orgateam. It was also the starting point for evacuations at Code Yellow: driving to the Forest Range Station by car, flight with ultra-light helicopter Guimbal Cabri G2 to the drop-off, which took approx. 90 minutes.

Location of the organisation and emergency team on site (Orgateam)
The local base was Forest Range Station (44.64074°S 169.50397°E) at an altitude of 410 m near Lindis Pass on State Highway 8. There also was the Helicopter take off place (44.63980°S 169.50440°E), about 5 km away from the drop-off zone. It was also the starting point for evacuations at Code Red: flight with ultra-light helicopter or ride with All-terrain vehicles to the drop-off, which took approx. 8 to 15 minutes.

Location of the drop-off of the participants
The participants were dropped off at the bottom of the 400-meter-deep Breast Creek (44.59238°S 169.48484°E) at an altitude of 610 meters on a plateau measuring around 3000 square meters.
Note: This is a fenced 140 km^{2} large private property and can only be accessed with the consent of the owner.

Uwe's Tree Antonia
(44.59531°S 169.50139°E)

Bridge for pickup
(44.59025°S 169.52720°E)

Weather station nearby and weather records
The weather station of the Wanaka airfield (44.722°S 169.246°E) is located 24 km to the southwest. Barometrically and due to the valley location, temperatures are expected to be 2 to 4 °C lower locally, so that −7 to 19 °C can be expected. Rainfall in May is between 50 and 200 mm. Compared to previous years, May 2024 was comparatively dry with 30 mm of precipitation and around 3 °C cooler.

=== Topographic Maps ===
Topomap of New Zealand

== Season 5 (2025) ==
The episodes are published from the beginning of 7. October 2025 on Prime Video and from 20. October 2025 on YouTube .[2]
