= Ein sehr gutes Quiz (mit hoher Gewinnsumme) =

- Genre: Variety game show
- Presented by: Joko Winterscheidt; Klaas Heufer-Umlauf
- Opening theme: Le Monde by Richard Carter
- Country of origin: Germany
- No. of seasons: 2
- No. of episodes: 15 (+1 pilot)

Production
- Producers: Arne Kreutzfeldt; Thomas Schmitt
- Production location: Various
- Running time: 165 minutes
- Production company: Florida Productions

Original release
- Network: ProSieben
- Release: 21 April 2024 – present

Ein sehr gutes Quiz (mit hoher Gewinnsumme) (English: "A very good quiz (with a large cash prize)"), often abbreviated to ESGQ, is a German game show aired on ProSieben. It was first aired on 21 April 2024 as part of a 24-hour programming marathon by Joko Winterscheidt and Klaas Heufer-Umlauf, and was recommissioned as a regular series starting from 22 March 2025.

== Story ==
On 21 April 2024, Joko Winterscheidt and Klaas Heufer-Umlauf took over the whole programming of ProSieben after winning the fiftieth episode special of their show Joko &amp; Klaas gegen ProSieben. Together with their production company Florida Entertainment, they opened up the ProSieben TV guide for a whole day. A part of this was a primetime quiz show titled Ein sehr gutes Quiz (mit hoher Gewinnsumme). During the live broadcast, Hannes Hiller, the main commissioner for ProSieben, rang Heufer-Umlauf on air and asked him and Winterscheidt to continue the show. The first regular episode was aired on 22 March 2025 with a revised format.

== Content ==
=== Place of broadcast ===
The programme is broadcast live and takes place in a different place in the German-speaking area of Europe each episode. The place of broadcast is only publicised at the start of every episode. Nonetheless, the distinctive set design of the mobile studio, consisting of a round metal frame, often gives away to those in the vicinity and to local media that the broadcast will be from there.

=== Contestants ===
As the live broadcast unfolds, it is possible for prospective contestants to travel to the place where each episode is broadcast in the hope of taking part. Contestants are randomly selected from the audience, and all potential contestants are given a number upon arrival. At the start of the programme, the first three contestants are picked to play together, and the first five replacements are also picked, who form a queue in front of the stage.

=== Format ===
The quiz originally consisted of twenty-five questions of increasing difficulty, from "easy", "medium", "hard", "harder" and even harder "Nightmare questions". Since the fifth episode, the difficulty names have been removed, instead simply going from Question 1 to Question 25 in blocks of five.

After each block of five questions, a special round will be played, in which a question will be answered under certain conditions, or a contestant will be tempted out of the game with a guaranteed payout. There are four kinds of special round, and all of them will appear in each episode: Trial, Temptation, Decision and Game. The special rounds may be replaced by a "Super nightmare question".

Three people play at any one time. Each question must be answered correctly within ninety seconds by one of the three players for all three players to progress to the next question. After a wrong answer, the responsible player will be replaced by the next replacement in the queue. If a question is not answered in time, all three players are replaced.

On the final question, the player who answers a question on the buzzer fastest wins. If the player answers incorrectly, the contestant is replaced, and another question is asked. The top prize of €100,000 may be reduced through special rounds.

== Broadcasts ==
=== Pilot ===
Series	No.	Date	Place broadcast	Gewinner	Amount
0	0	21 April 2024	Studio Berlin, Adlershof	Carola	€100,000

=== Series 1 ===
Episode	In series	Date	Place of broadcast	Winner	Amount
1	1	22 March 2025	Autohof Bad Rappenau Nord, Bad Rappenau	Alina	€100,000
2	2	29 March 2025	Seebrücke Koserow, Koserow	Ronny	€100,000
3	3	5 April 2025	Mittelstation Zwölferkogel, Saalbach-Hinterglemm	Marei	€99,980
4	4	12 April 2025	Gasthaus Brinnis, Schönwölkau	Max	€97,500
5	5	20 September 2025	Duisburg Gateway Terminal, Duisburg	Fabio	€90,000
6	6	27 September 2025	Großraumdiskothek Vulcano, Aicha vorm Wald	Viktor	€90,000
7	7	4 October 2025	ProSiebenSat.1-Campus, Unterföhring	Bianca	€95,000
8	8	11 October 2025	Sportpark Donnerschwee, Oldenburg	Reni	€98,400

=== Series 2 ===
Episode	In series	Date	Place of broadcast	Winner	Amount
9	1	19 April 2026	Tropical Islands, Krausnick	Basti	€100,000
10	2	26 April 2026	Schloss Bröllin, Fahrenwalde	Carina	€100,000
11	3	3 May 2026	Wertstoffhof Nord, Erfurt	Julia	€100,000
12	4	10 May 2026	Plassenburg, Kulmbach	Piraveena	€90,000
13	5	20 September 2026	Erlebnispark Tripsdrill, Cleebronn	Simon	€100,000
14	6	11 October 2026	Universität Paderborn	René	€100,000
15	7	18 October 2026	Kloster Eberbach	Helen	€100,000
16	8	25 October 2026	Völklinger Hütte	Roland	€100,000

== Awards ==
The show's producers and crew with the Deutscher Fernsehpreis 2025

=== Deutscher Fernsehpreis ===
- 2025: "Best Entertainment Show"
