= Golden Camera =

Golden Camera is an award given by more than one organisation:

- Caméra d'Or; an award of the Cannes Film Festival
- Goldene Kamera; an annual German film and television award, awarded by the television magazine Horzu
