= Papaplatte =

German Internet personality

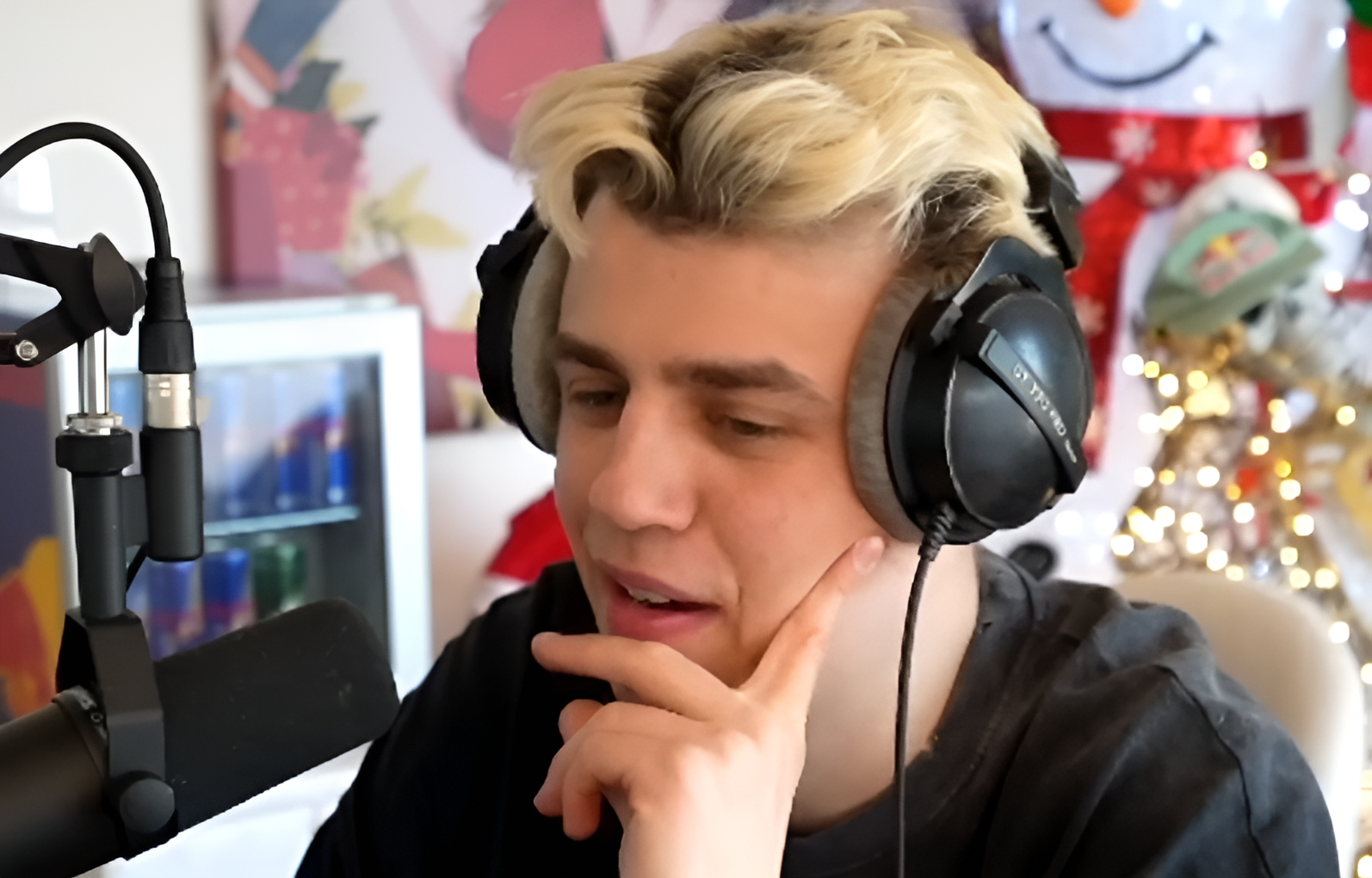
- Papaplatte during a live stream

Twitch information
- Channel: Papaplatte
- Genres: Just Chatting, Gaming
- Followers: 3.1 million

YouTube information
- Channels: Papaplatte; domopapaplatte; PapaplatteGaming
- Years active: 2014–present
- Genres: Let's Play; vlog; reaction
- Subscribers: 1.33 million
- Views: 291.1 million
- Last updated: August 2026

Papaplatte (born 24 January 1997 in Köpenick, Berlin; real name Kevin Andreas Teller) is a German content creator and streamer.

== Life ==
Teller grew up in Königs Wusterhausen. He began dancing at the age of eleven and soon took part in professional dance competitions.

In 7th grade, he and two friends opened a YouTube channel called SchnitzelTV, on which they posted comedy videos. When the group disbanded, Teller switched to the live streaming platform Twitch on his own. He graduated from the Friedrich Schiller Gymnasium in Königs Wusterhausen and then studied electrical engineering at the Technische Universität Berlin. After six months, he gave up his studies and dancing to concentrate on his work as an influencer and streamer.

He has been with his partner Masha since mid-2021. Teller lives in Cologne.

== Medial appearance ==
=== Twitch ===
Papaplatte created his Twitch channel in November 2013; he obtained the Twitch partnership in February 2014.

In February 2021, Papaplatte and Trymacs jointly opened a display of first-generation Pokémon trading cards in German - worth around 40,000 euros at the time. During the live event on Twitch, they reached a total viewer count of 356,000 (301,000 for Trymacs and 55,000 for Papaplatte), breaking the previous record of 328,000 viewers set by Knossi in October 2020.

In mid-2021, information about Twitch streamers' income from subscriptions and donations became public due to a leak. From August 2019 to October 2021, Papaplatte earned around 1.29 million euros, making him one of the highest-earning German-speaking streamers during this period.

As of August 2024, Papaplatte is the Twitch channel with the most subscribers (33,912) and third most followers (2.52 million) in Germany.

In August 2025 Papaplatte received criticism after a former editor for one of his channels on YouTube made allegations against him, after Papaplatte terminated their collaboration. He later stated he acted wrong, and is in touch with the editor to make up for damage.

=== Podcast ===
Edeltalk - mit Dominik & Kevin
- Genre: Comedyshow
- Created by: Kevin Teller; Dominik "Reeze" Reezmann
- Original release: November 2018
- No. of episodes: over 331
- Sponsored by: Funk
- Website: https://play.funk.net/channel/edeltalk-12381

Since November 2018, Papaplatte has hosted the weekly comedy podcast Edeltalk with Dominik Reezmann, in which the friends talk about stories from the past, but also current topics and trends. A book about the podcast entitled Edeltalk was published by Riva Verlag on March 22, 2022.

In September 2022, a live podcast was held for the first time as part of the 1LIVE podcast festival. In autumn 2023, Teller and Reezmann went on a live tour through Germany and Austria with their podcast.

Since December 2024, the podcast has been part of the public media offering Funk.

=== Others ===
==== Pokémon ====
In October 2020, YouTuber Logan Paul opened an entire display of English-language first-generation Pokémon trading cards in a livestream. Papaplatte bought a pack for around 11,000 euros, from which Paul pulled a legendary Charizard. This first-generation card was worth around 65,000 euros at the time.

==== Edeltour ====
In August 2021, Papaplatte and Dominik Reezmann started a motorhome tour called Edeltour, based on the duo's podcast. During the tour, they crossed Germany, France, Italy and Austria, among others. Every day, they streamed for several hours as they explored the various cities.

The second edition of the Edeltour followed in March 2023, in which the two crossed Scandinavia with their streamer colleague LetsHugo.

The third edition of the Edeltour began at the end of September 2024, this time leading through Southeastern Europe. With the streams from the tour, Papaplatte and Reeze reached an average of 50,000 viewers.

==== Music ====
Papaplatte is a German rap fan and writes his own songs. In December 2020, he released the song Holzscheit on Spotify together with Dominik Reezmann. At the beginning of 2021, he released the song Daytona Noflex with Danny. After Danny was sentenced to probation for two counts of rape, Papaplatte distanced himself from him and had the joint song removed from all streaming platforms. In July 2021 he released his song Bis zu ihr. In October 2023, Papaplatte and Reeze released the song Alkohol ich liebe dich.

==== Spielesause ====
In August 2021, Papaplatte, together with Trymacs and Gronkh, organized a livestream event called Spielesause. Since Gamescom was again only held digitally in 2021, the three influencers wanted to convey the "trade fair feeling" through the livestream. They invited many guests from TV and the web for video game sessions and sports tournaments. During the event, up to 115,000 spectators watched simultaneously.

==== Jugendwort des Jahres ====
In 2021, "papatastisch," which refers to Papaplatte, made it into the top 10 in the Langenscheidt publishing house's vote for the youth word of the year in Germany.

The popularity of the youth word of the year 2023, "goofy," had long been fueled by Papaplatte.

==== Participation in 7 vs. Wild ====
In 2023, he took part in the third season of the survival reality show 7 vs. Wild as part of a team with Dominik Reezmann. He managed to survive 14 days in the Canadian wilderness.

==== Television appearances ====
In mid-November 2023, Papaplatte and his viewers solved a number of puzzles posed by Joko and Klaas as part of Joko & Klaas LIVE in order to find out the geocoordinates for a hidden suitcase with the symbolic contents of one million euros. Shortly after the last puzzle was solved, a viewer of the streamer actually found the suitcase, whereupon Papaplatte, whom the finder thanked immediately after the discovery, was also connected to the Late Night Berlin show for a "debriefing".

Teller has since taken part in other television shows hosted by Joko and Klaas, including Das Duell um die Welt and Joko & Klaas gegen ProSieben.

On February 4, 2024, Teller launched his own event called "Motor Games" in cooperation with Joyn.

== Reception (selection) ==
- „Ich bin keine Rampensau". Interview. In: Die Welt. 10. Juli 2023, S. 14–15.
- Caspar von Au: Mit Kochshows und Yoga in den Mainstream. In: Süddeutsche Zeitung. 26. Mai 2020, S. 18 (sueddeutsche.de): „Zwei P rotieren um sich selbst, darunter steht: ‚Gleich geht's los'. Es ist 15.15 Uhr und Kevin Teller, auf der Streamingplattform besser bekannt als ‚Papaplatte', verspätet sich."

== Publications ==
- with Reeze, Mikkel Robrahn: Edeltalk. anthology. riva Verlag, München 2022, ISBN 978-3-96775-080-5.
