= Die beste Show der Welt =

German television show

Die beste Show der Welt ("The best show of the world") is a German television show which was first broadcast on 30 April 2016 on ProSieben. In the program, presenters Joko Winterscheidt and Klaas Heufer-Umlauf present three independent show concepts. After all six shows have been presented, the studio audience decides which show wins the title of the "best show in the world" or the "worst show in the world". Voting devices are used by the spectators. These "remote controls" can also be used for the interactive design of the show. The moderator is Jeannine Michaelsen. In the third and fourth edition, Oliver Kalkofe commented on the events and judged the respective shows.

The program is produced by Florida TV and was awarded the Deutscher Fernsehpreis in 2017.

== Show concept ==
Joko Winterscheidt and Klaas Heufer-Umlauf present three (until episode 4 up to 4) shows each with a length of about 20 to 30 minutes. The presented shows are partly new show ideas, but are also based on existing TV show formats, which are slightly modified and parodied. At the same time, the two of them may force each other to participate in a show once per episode ("Joker").

In the first four episodes, the studio audience with voting devices determined the audience for the show shown, which was shown live to the home TV viewer as a superimposed graphic. This graphic was removed with episode five on 2 December 2017. Each of the 600 people in the studio could switch on or off during the show, as if sitting at home in front of the TV, using their voting device, which acted like a remote control. Over the entire run time of the show they could be switched on or off as often as liked. The ratings were therefore close to how good or bad the show was received by the studio audience. This was only visible to the TV viewer at home, but not for the studio audience. Until the second installment of the programme, a "cloud of light" consisting of white spheres fixed above the studio and illuminated with lasers was installed, which visualized to the audience the show rating by its brightness. The more spectators from the studio audience turned on, the brighter the cloud of light became. Since the third edition, these are no longer available. At the end of a show, the average ratings are calculated and announced. Should the audience rating drop below 25% during a show, it will enter the "red area" (coloured red on the graphic). This is now also audiovisually signaled in the studio (light turns red and the picture on the video wall in the background falls apart). If the ratings stays below 25% for more than one minute, the show must be cancelled. The generated points up to that moment are forfeited.

Since the fifth episode no quota is generated during the show. Instead, viewers in the audience at the end of the show choose the show they like best from all six concepts presented. "The worst show in the world" is determined.

Joko or Klaas win a trophy for the "Best Show in the World", the German Television Award in an oversized version (referred to in the show as the "German Television Prize in XXL") as a parody of the real German Television Award.

== Broadcasts ==
Episode	Date	Shows
1	30. April 2016	Winner: Joko with "Dürften wir?" ("May We?") (85 %); Other shows: 2. Joko with "The Yes or No Show" (84%); 3. Klaas with "Der beste Preis der Welt" ("The World's Best Price") (82%); 4. Klaas with "The David Flame Show" (79%); 5. Joko with "Game of Drones" (75%); 6. Klaas with "Höhenangst Die Show" ("Acrophobia - The Show") (Jokershow) (65%); Cancelled shows: Joko with "Der Schöne und der Dumme" ("The Beauty and the Dumbass") (Jokershow); Klaas with "Kein Herz für Tiere" ("No Heart for Animals")
2	27. August 2016	Winner: Joko with "Der Dümmste friert" ("The Loser Freezes") (93%) (Jokershow); Other shows: 2. Klaas with "Das Auge kocht mit" ("Eat with Your Eyes") (91%); 3. Klaas with "My Idiot Friend" (86%); 4. Joko with "Die große ProSieben Rückwärtsfußball-WM" ("The Big ProSieben Reverse-Soccer World Cup") (85%); 5. Klaas with "Shitstorm Roulette XXL" (82%) (Jokershow); 6. Joko with "Unanfassbar" ("Untouchable") (77%); 7. Klaas with "Hart aber Unfair" ("Hard but Unfair") (42%); 8. Joko with "Faszination Forschung" ("Fascination Science") (31%)
3	4. February 2017	Winner: Joko with "Let's Dance on Ice" (Jokershow) (89%); Other shows: 2. Klaas with "World Promi Wrestling" ("World Celebrity Wrestling") (Jokershow) (84%); 3. Joko with "Die Tribute von Winterscheidt" ("The Tribute of Winterscheidt") (83%); 4. Klaas with "The Noise of Germany" (82%); 5. Joko with "Dinner for Mom" (79%); 6. Joko with "Dabei sein ist teuer" ("Participating Is Expensive") (76%); 7. Klaas with "Geld oder Würde" ("Money or Dignity") (41%); Cancelled shows: Klaas with "Schlag den Herzschlag" ("Beat the Heartbeat")
4	22. April 2017	Winner: Joko with "Wahrheit oder Werbespot" ("Truth or Advertisement") (84%); Other shows: 2. Klaas with "Mein Mann kann ... das betrunken gar nicht mal so gut" (82%); 3. Klaas with "RTL Die Show" ("RTL - The Show") (Jokershow) (81%); 4. Joko with "Scheinbeintritt-Weltmeisterschaft" ("Shin-kicking World Championship") (Jokershow) (79%); 5. Klaas with "Du schaffst das! - Hoffentlich nicht" ("You Can Do It! - Hopefully Not") (77%); 6. Klaas with "Männer die auf Preise starren" ("Men Who Are Staring on Prices") (68%); 7. Joko with "Rette deinen Preis" ("Save Your Price") (54%); The last show of Joko was not played, after the last show of Klaas was in the lead.
5	2. December 2017	Winner: Klaas with "Bingoman Live" (Jokershow) (31%); Others shows: 2. Joko with "Good Night Show Family Edition" (25%); Joko with "Ich kann's besser" ("I Can Do It better"); Klaas with "Middlemaster of the Universe"; Klaas with "Nur die Liebe zahlt" ("Only Love Counts") Worst show of the world: Joko with "Frottee Fight Club" ("Towel Fight Club") (Jokershow) (7%) The revised rating system gave only three of the six rating results. The sorting of the other shows is done in chronological order.
6	31. March 2018	Winner: Klaas with "Pietro Lombardi Das Musical" ("Pietro Lombardi - The Musical") (42%); Other shows: 2. Joko with "Heavy Mental" (31%); Joko with "Mini Play Gag Show"; Klaas with "Das schlimmste Gericht" ("The Worst Dish") (Jokershow); Klaas with "Auf dich(t) kann man sich verlassen" ("You Can Rely on Drunken People") Worst show of the world: Joko with "Die ProSieben Gips-Weltmeisterschaft" ("The ProSieben Gypsum World Championship") (Jokershow) (1%)
7	11. August 2018	Winner: Joko with "Earn Your Song" (51%); Other shows: 2. Klaas with "Wer zuckt, verliert" ("You Move, You Lose") (Jokershow) (33%); Joko with "Bares für Wahres" ("Cash for Truth") (Jokershow); Klaas with "Fashion-Victims"; Joko with "Flutschball-Weltmeisterschaft" ("Slideball World Championship") Worst show of the world: Klaas with "Hart aber unfair Promi-Edition" ("Hard but Unfair - Celebrity Edition)" (3%)
8	29. September 2018	Winner: Joko with "Die Rückwärtsshow" ("The Reverse-Show") (Jokershow) (rating hit) (95%); Other shows: 2. Klaas with "Die beste Soap der Welt" ("The Best Soap Opera in the World") (Jokershow) (rating hit) (89%); 3. Joko with "Joko Christ Superstar" (rating hit) (88%); 4. Klaas with "Studio Sabortaggio" (71%); 5. Joko with "Kochduellchen" ("Little Cook Duel") (69%); 6. Klaas with "Kleb an deinem Preis" ("Stick with Your Price") (66%); They have gone back to the previous rating system, so that all shows got their own rating again. All shows over 80% were marked as "ratings hit" and their true rating were only shown in the final.
9	30. March 2019	Winner: Klaas with "Liebe macht blind und taub" ("Love Makes You Blind and Deaf") (rating hit) (90%); Other shows: 2. Klaas with "Wo bin ich? Was mach ich hier?" ("Where Am I? What Am I Doing Here?") (rating hit) (89%); 3. Joko with "Zwei Promis & ein Todesfall" ("Two Celebrities & A Funeral") (rating hit) (Jokershow) (85%); 4. Joko with "Wie weit fliegt meine Familie?" ("How Far Does My Family Fly?") (62%); Cancelled shows: Klaas with "Auf mein Kommando" ("At My Command") (Jokershow); Joko with "Joko & die Waschmaschine" ("Joko & the Washing Machine")
