= Goldene Kamera =

Annual German film and television award (1966-2019)

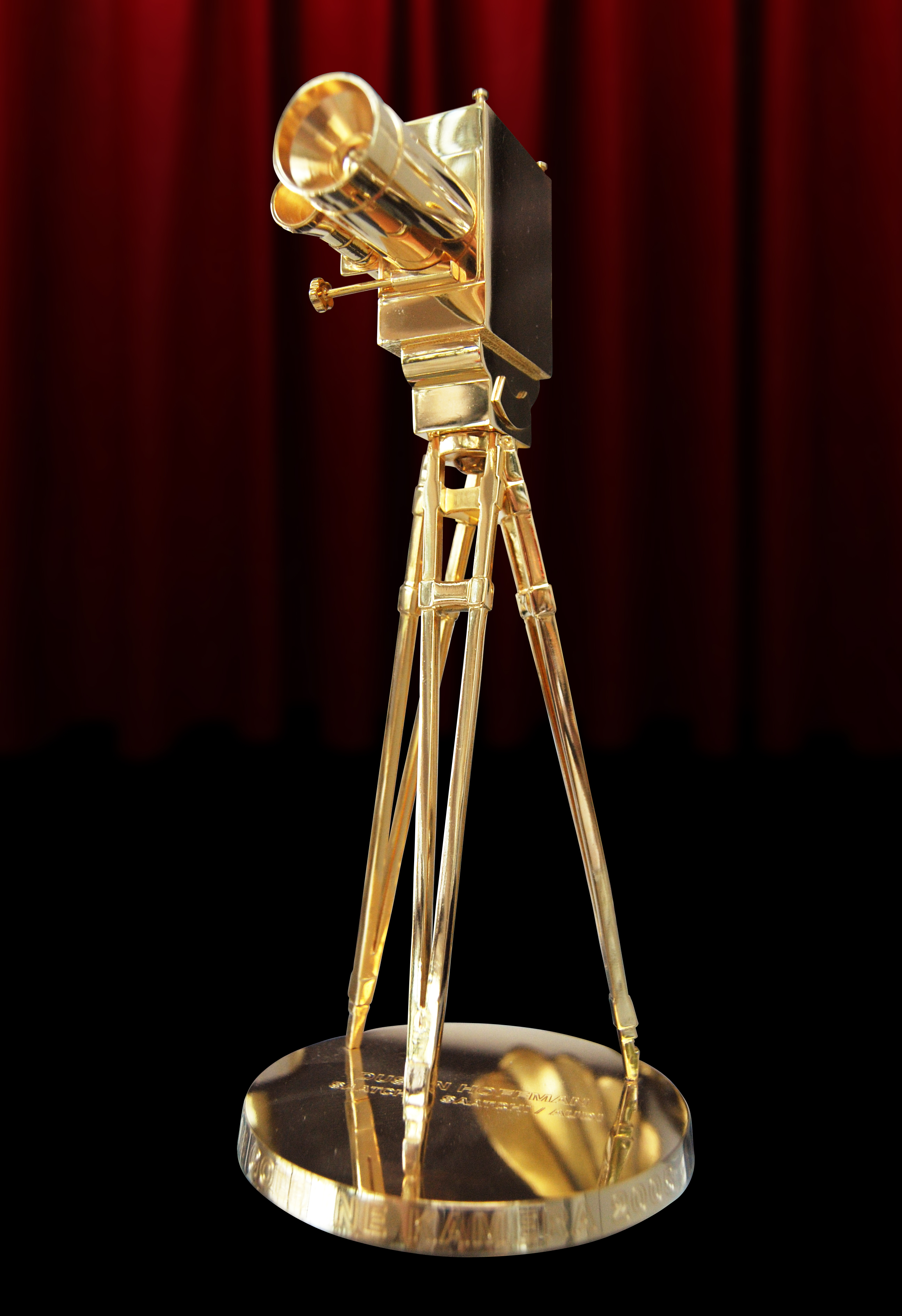
- Awarded for: Film and television
- Date: 1966–2019
- Presented by: Funke Mediengruppe
- Website: goldenekamera.de

The Goldene Kamera ("Golden Camera") is an annual German film and television award, awarded by the Funke Mediengruppe. The award show was usually held in early February in Hamburg, but also took place in Berlin on occasion. It has been paused since 2019, after dropping the traditional award categories some time earlier.

== History ==
The award was first presented in 1966 as a strictly German television award. Since 1987, it has also been awarded to international stars. In 1995, the categories expanded to pop groups and to more public interest categories.

In 2017, the award show was pranked by German comedians Joko Winterscheidt and Klaas Heufer-Umlauf, who arranged for a Ryan Gosling impersonator to be awarded the "Best International Film" prize for La La Land. Following the event, a speaker for television broadcaster ZDF asked for the trophy to be given back, stating that La La Land had won the prize and that the trophy would be given to the real Ryan Gosling. The incident, which became known as "GoslingGate", sparked criticism of the event's concept. Media critics argued that the "Best International Film" award had only been created in an effort to get Gosling on the show, with no regards for the film's quality. In 2018, Winterscheidt and Heufer-Umlauf were awarded the Grimme Award for their media criticism.

In 2019, a Climate Action Award was given to Greta Thunberg. In September 2019, Funke Mediengruppe announced the end of the traditional award for 2020. Due to a change in media consumption preferences of their audience in the course of digitization, the manager of Funke's magazine division said that the group would instead focus on digital content like the YouTube Goldene Kamera Digital Award. The YouTube Goldene Kamera Digital Awards were held from 2017 until 2020. The final main Goldene Kamera awards ceremony was planned to be awarded on 21 March 2020 with Thomas Gottschalk as presenter. Due to the COVID-19 pandemic, the event in March 2020 was cancelled. It was rescheduled initially for 12 November 2020, and later again to an unspecified date.

== Traditional awards categories ==
Over the decades, the award show maintained a set of recurring traditional categories, with slight variations in naming depending on the year

- Best German Actor (Bester deutscher Schauspieler)

A core award of the gala, honouring outstanding male acting performances in German television and film.

- Best German Actress (Beste deutsche Schauspielerin)

Parallel to the actor award, given to female performers in German productions.

- Best International Actor / Actress (Bester/Beste Schauspieler(in) International)

Awarded to international stars, especially from film and television industries abroad.

- Best German TV-Film (Bester deutscher Fernsehfilm)

A long-standing award category recognizing excellence in stand-alone television films.

- Best German Miniseries / Multi-part Production (Bester deutscher Mehrteiler/Miniserie)

Presented to outstanding serialized or multi-part German television productions.

- Best Series / Best TV Show (Beste Serie / Beste Show)

Award categories for entertainment shows or scripted series, depending on the year.

- Young Talent Award (Nachwuchspreis)

A recurring award for promising new performers or filmmakers.

- Programme Awards (e.g., Best Dokutainment, Best Documentary: Nature & Environment)

Categories recognising factual or documentary television formats.

- Lifetime Achievement Award (Lebenswerk / Lebenswerk International)

Given to individuals with a distinguished career in film or television.

- Special Prizes (Sonderpreise)

Occasionally presented for social or cultural contributions (e.g., 2019 Climate Action prize awarded to Greta Thunberg).

=== YouTube Digital Awards categories ===
In 2020, the YouTube Goldene Kamera Digital Awards comprised the following categories:

- Best of Information
- Special Award International
- Best of Entertainment
- Special Award National
- Best Newcomer
- Best of Education & Coaching
- Best Brand Channel

== Description ==
The Goldene Kamera was awarded by the Funke Mediengruppe. The award show was usually held in early February in Hamburg, but had also taken place in Berlin in the past.

The gold-plated silver award model was created by Berlin artist Wolfram Beck. It is 25 cm (9.8 in) high and weighs around 900 grams (2.0 lb).
