= Lassie Come Home (2020 film) =

2020 film by Hanno Olderdissen

- Theatrical release poster
- Directed by: Hanno Olderdissen
- Screenplay by: Jane Ainscough
- Based on: Lassie Come-Home by Eric Knight
- Produced by: Henning Ferber
- Starring: Nico Marischka; Sebastian Bezzel; Anna Maria Mühe; Bella Bading; Justus von Dohnányi
- Cinematography: Martin Schlecht
- Edited by: Nicole Kortlüke
- Music by: Enis Rotthoff
- Production companies: Henning Ferber Filmproduktions; Warner Bros. Film Productions Germany; Traumfabrik Babelsberg; Südstern Film; Turner Entertainment Co. (rights holder, uncredited)
- Distributed by: Warner Bros. Pictures
- Release date: 20 February 2020
- Running time: 96 minutes
- Country: Germany
- Language: German
- Box office: $3,765,312

Lassie Come Home (German: Lassie – Eine abenteuerliche Reise) is a 2020 German film directed by Hanno Olderdissen. It is a remake of the 1943 film Lassie Come Home, based on the book of the same name by Eric Knight. It is the eleventh film based on Lassie.

The film premiered at Zoo Palast on 16 February in Berlin and was released in Germany by Warner Bros. Pictures on 20 February.

== Cast ==
- Nico Marischka as Florian "Flo" Maurer
- Sebastian Bezzel as Andreas Maurer
- Anna Maria Mühe as Sandra Maurer
- Bella Bading as Priscilla von Sprengel
- Matthias Habich as Graf von Sprengel
- Justus von Dohnányi as Butler Gerhardt
- Christoph Letkowski as Hausmeister Hinz
- Johann von Bülow as Sebastian von Sprengel
- Jana Pallaske as Zirkusartistin Franka
