= Paul Ripke =

German photographer

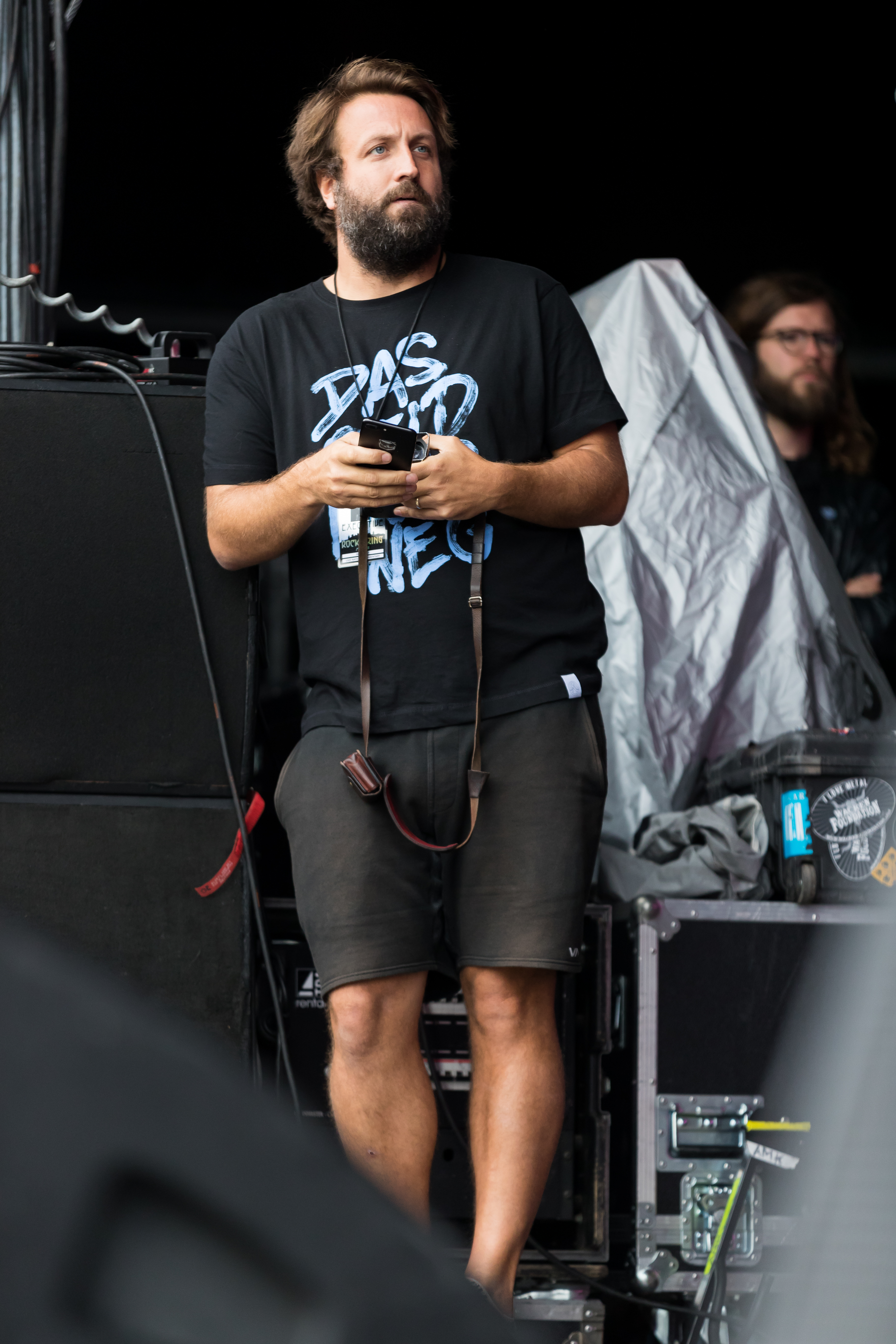
- Ripke backstage at Rock am Ring (2017)
- Born: 10 February 1981 (age 45); Heidelberg, Baden-Württemberg, West Germany
- Occupations: Photographer; director
- Years active: 2002–present
- Website: paulripke.com

Paul Ripke (born February 10, 1981) is a German fashion and sports photographer and music video director prolific for his photographs and videos of athletes, celebrities, models, and other cultural figures.

== Early life ==
Ripke was born in Heidelberg, Baden-Württemberg, West Germany where his father was a medical doctor and his mother was a lawyer. He studied business administration but dropped out of university to teach himself photography.

== Photography ==
Ripke began his career as a music photographer in 2002 when he started shooting a series of artist portraits for German hip hop music magazine Backspin. He documented the Krach der Republik tour of German punk rock band Die Toten Hosen during 2012-2013 and directed their music video "Das ist der Moment". He frequently collaborates with German hip hop artist Marteria and accompanied Formula One drivers Nico Rosberg and Lewis Hamilton during their respective championship seasons. When the Germany national football team won the World Cup Final in Rio de Janeiro in 2014, he produced a series of renowned portraits while the team celebrated on the field of Maracanã Stadium. Since 2015 he has been publishing the quarterly collaborative magazine Hedonist Post, featuring the works of various international photographers. In September 2018, Ripke directed the live production of Marteria's "Live Im Ostseestadion" concert movie. In March 2019, German singer Lena published her music video directed and filmed by Ripke to accompany the release of her song "Don't Lie to Me". He also worked in Formula 1 as the photographer for Lewis Hamilton, Valtteri Bottas and the Mercedes Amg Petronas F1 Team.

== Works ==
=== Books ===
- One Night in Rio. Hamburg 2014 ISBN 978-3-8419-0348-8
- Ring der Nebelungen. Berlin 2015.
- Die Toten Hosen – Bitte lächeln, von San Telmo bis Leipzig. Düsseldorf 2015.

=== Magazines ===
- since 2015: The Hedonist Post (quarterly)

=== Podcast ===
- since 2017: Alle Wege Führen Nach Ruhm, with Joko Winterscheidt
