= Martin Schlecht =

German cinematographer

- Born: 10 November 1976 (age 49); West Germany
- Occupation: cinematographer
- Years active: 2005–present
- Website: Agency: Above the Line Berlin GmbH (in German)

Martin Schlecht (born 10 November 1976) is a German cinematographer.

== Life and career ==
Martin Schlecht, born 1976 began his career as a camera assistant. From 2011 on he worked for movie productions and television productions as a cameraman. In 2013 he gained recognition for his work for the movie Grossstadtklein, later for the TV movie Tatort: Kalter Engel. In 2014 he worked for Til Schweiger on the film Head Full of Honey as a cameraman.

== Selected filmography ==
- 2011: The Big Black
- 2012: Reality XL
- 2013: Grossstadtklein
- 2013: Tatort: Kalter Engel
- 2014: Head Full of Honey (Honig im Kopf)
- 2020: Lassie Come Home
