= Grossstadtklein =

2013 German comedy film

- Theatrical release poster
- Directed by: Tobias Wiemann
- Written by: Tobias Wiemann
- Produced by: Julia Etzelmüller; Til Schweiger; Tom Zickler
- Starring: Jacob Matschenz; Jytte-Merle Böhrnsen; Klaas Heufer-Umlauf; Kostja Ullmann
- Cinematography: Martin Schlecht
- Edited by: Olivia Retzer
- Music by: Dirk Reichardt; David Jürgens
- Production companies: Mr. Brown Entertainment; Warner Bros. Film Productions Germany; SevenPictures Film
- Distributed by: Warner Bros. Pictures
- Release date: 15 August 2013
- Running time: 98 minutes
- Country: Germany
- Language: German
- Box office: $196,451

Grossstadtklein (German: Großstadtklein, lit. 'Big City, Small Town') is a 2013 German comedy film written and directed by Tobias Wiemann.

== Cast ==
- Jacob Matschenz as Ole
- Jytte-Merle Böhrnsen as Fritzi
- Klaas Heufer-Umlauf as Rokko
- Kostja Ullmann as Ronny
- Pit Bukowski as Marcel
- Tobias Moretti as Manni
- Ulrike Krumbiegel as Susanne
