= Fahrenwalde =

- Municipality
- Location of Fahrenwalde within Vorpommern-Greifswald district
- Interactive map of Fahrenwalde
- Location within Germany Location within Mecklenburg-Vorpommern
- Coordinates: 53°26′N 14°04′E
- Country: Germany
- State: Mecklenburg-Vorpommern
- District: Vorpommern-Greifswald
- Municipal assoc.: Uecker-Randow-Tal

Government
  - Mayor: Stefan Zimmermann

Area
  - Total: 26.10 km^{2} (10.08 sq mi)
- Elevation: 70 m (230 ft)

Population (2025-12-31)
  - Total: 260
  - Density: 10/km^{2} (26/sq mi)
- Time zone: UTC+01:00 (CET)
  - Summer (DST): UTC+02:00 (CEST)
- Postal codes: 17309
- Dialling codes: 039747
- Vehicle registration: VG
- Website: www.amt-uecker-randow-tal.de

Fahrenwalde is a municipality in the district of Vorpommern-Greifswald in the east of the German federal state Mecklenburg-Vorpommern. It is administrated by the Amt Uecker-Randow-Tal, which is based in Pasewalk.

The municipality also includes the three villages of Bröllin, Friedrichshof and Karlsruh.

== Geography ==
The municipality is located near the border to the federal state of Brandenburg and is on a plateau, which is sloping downward in a northeast direction to the Randowbruch. The surrounding area between the city of Pasewalk and small uckermarkian city of Brüssow is hilly (with heights of up to 99m). Between the core village Fahrenwalde and the villages Bröllin and Friedrichshof there are a number of small lakes (among them the "Ziegeleipfuhl" and the "Kleiner Roetpfuhl").

== History ==
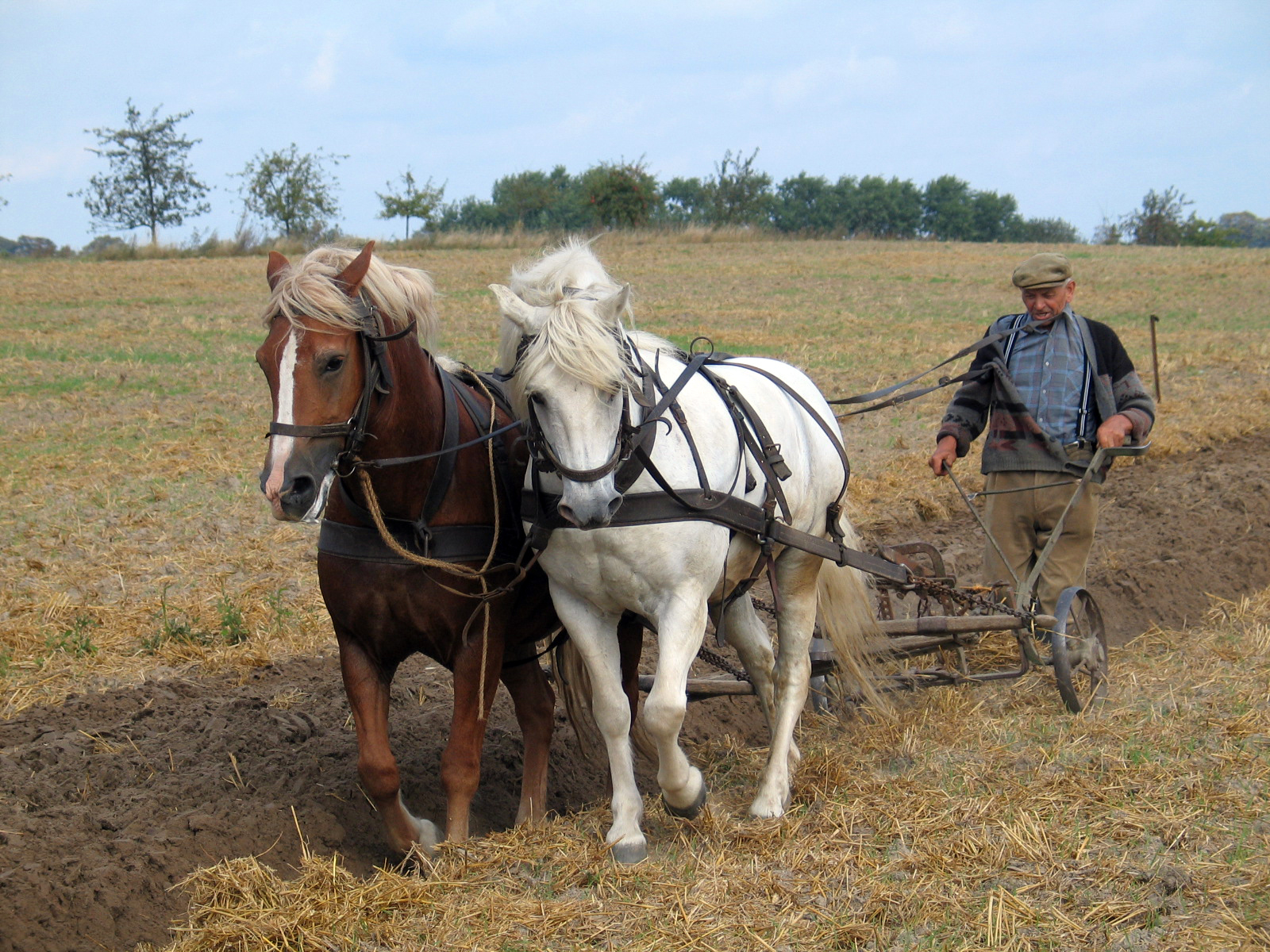
A farmer practising traditional agriculture in Fahrenwalde

Up to 1945 Fahrenwalde belonged to the Prussian borough of Prenzlau, which later became a part of Brandenburg. On 25 July 1952 Fahrenwalde was reassigned to the borough of Pasewalk in the district of Neubrandenburg.

Old farm houses and their associated buildings make up the scenery of the village Fahrenwalde.

In the 19th century the village of Bröllin had one of the most technologically advanced farming complexes in the region. Today this estate is called Schloss Bröllin and is home to an international production centre for performing arts.

== Traffic connection ==
The motorway connection Pasewalk-Ost for the Ostseeautobahn A20 is approximately 9 km away. A train connection is available at a 10 km distance at Pasewalk train station.

== Personalities ==
On 27 May 1875 the uckermarkian poet Max Lindow was born in the old school house. He is composer of the "Uckermarklied", a song about the region, and in his stories he often referred to his youth in Fahrenwalde.

== Literature ==
- Liselott Enders: Historisches Ortslexikon für Brandenburg, Teil VIII, Uckermark, Weimar 1986, ISBN 3-7400-0042-2
- Johannes Schultze (Hrsg.): Das Landbuch der Mark Brandenburg von 1375, Veröffentlichung der Historischen Kommission für die Provinz Brandenburg und die Reichshauptstadt Berlin, VIII, 2, Berlin 1940
