= Riccardo Simonetti =

German-Italian presenter and author

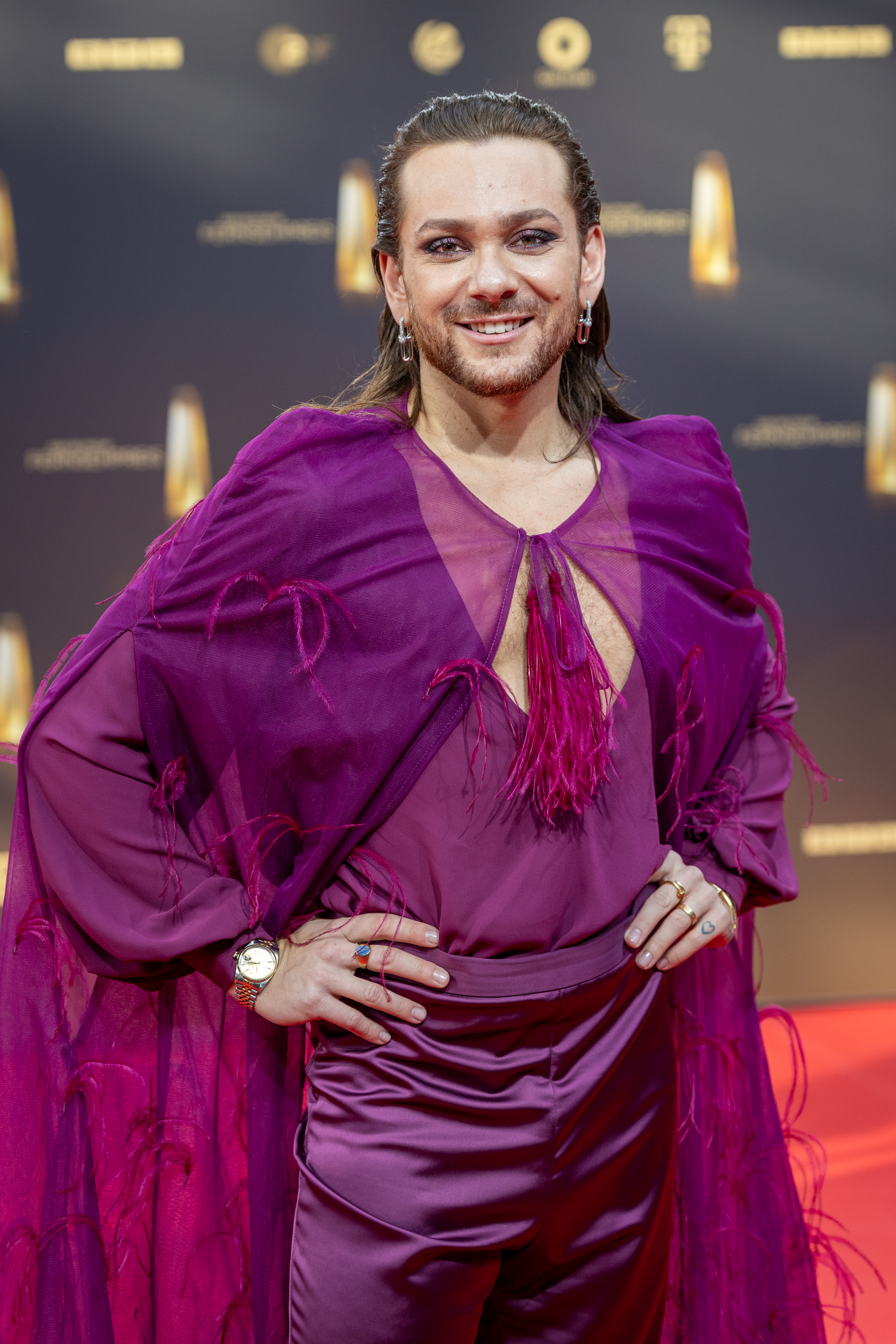
- Simonetti in 2023
- Born: 16 February 1993 (age 33); Bad Reichenhall, Germany
- Occupations: Media personality; author
- Years active: 2011–present

Riccardo Simonetti (born 16 February 1993) is a German media personality and author. He hosts the ZDFneo reality competition Glow Up – Germany’s Next Make-Up Star (since 2022) and the WDR nostalgia series Legendär!. In 2021 he founded the non-profit Riccardo Simonetti Initiative.

== Career ==
Simonetti first became known as a blogger and media personality before appears into television in the late 2010.

In 2021 WDR launched the nostalgia show Legendär!, hosted by Simonetti, revisiting popular culture of past decades. In 2022 ZDFneo premiered Glow Up – Deutschlands nächster Make-up-Star, with Simonetti as host.

His first talk show, Salon Simonetti (2022), was produced for ARD/WDR.

Simonetti has also worked as a voice actor; in the German dub of Incredibles 2 (2018) he voiced the superhero HeLectrix.

== Personal life ==
Simonetti is openly gay. He married his partner Steven on 29 August 2024 in Mallorca.

== Works ==
=== Television (host) ===
- Legendär! (WDR, 2021)
- Glow Up – Deutschlands nächster Make-up-Star (ZDFneo, 2022)

=== Voice acting ===
- Incredibles 2 (German version, 2018) - HeLectrix.

=== Podcasts ===
In 2023 Simonetti co-created the Spotify Original podcast Quality Time mit Riccardo & Anke with Anke Engelke. From late 2023 to 2024 the duo continued with the Free Hugs weekly podcast.
