= Schloss Bröllin =

Coordinates: 53.4608°N 14.0510°E

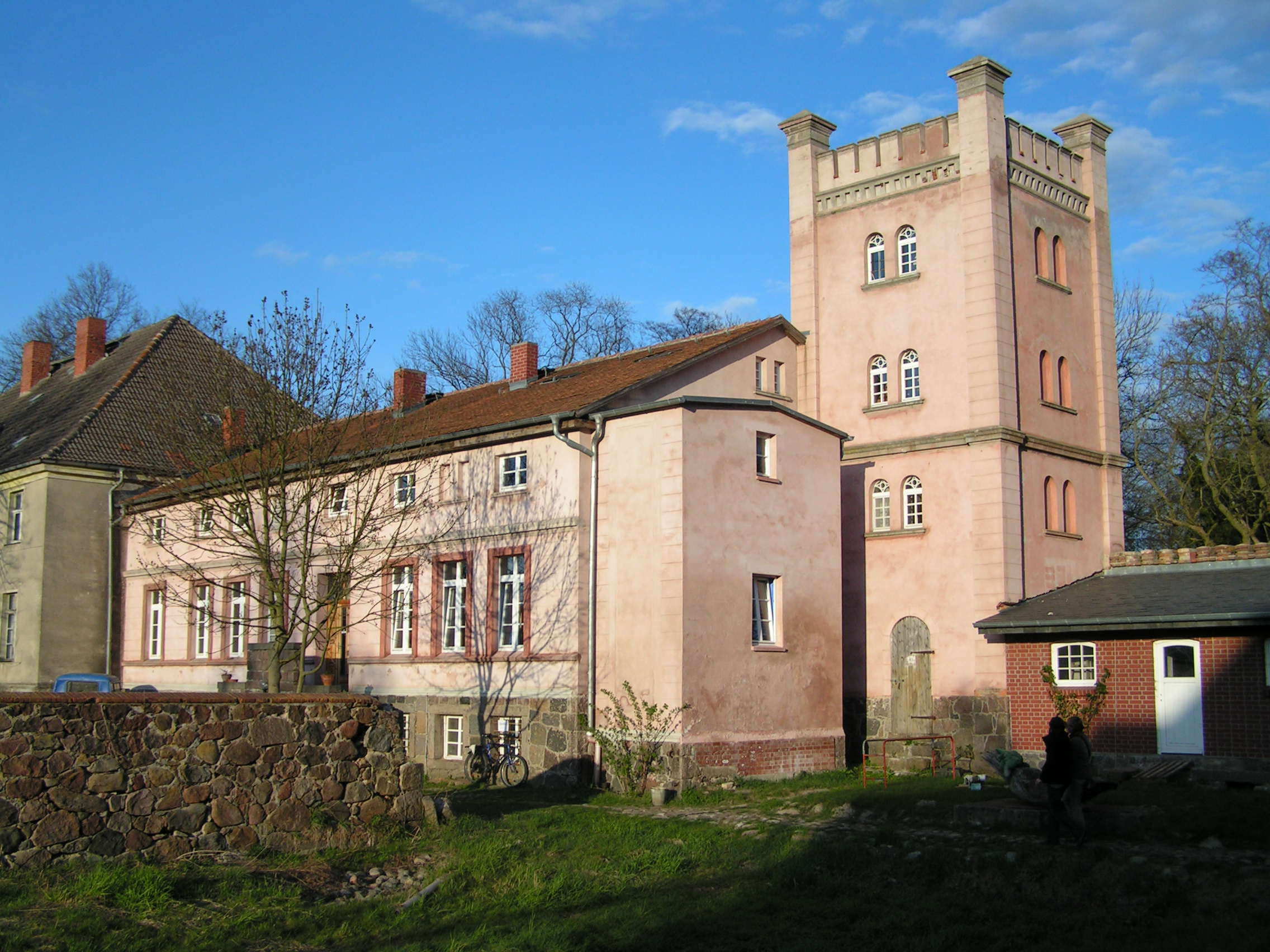
Old manor house with tower

Schloss Bröllin is an 800-year-old heritage protected estate in the German region of Vorpommern, approximately 30 km (19 mi) from the Polish border. It is one of the few estates in the area which is preserved as a whole, and thereby also an important testament of the development of agricultural production in the region. It is listed as a Baudenkmal in the municipality of Fahrenwalde.

The name can be somewhat misleading: Schloss Bröllin is not a castle, it is an old manor house. The tower of the manor house inspired the villagers to start using the name “Schloss” in the 1970s, and it has been used ever since.

== Location ==
Bröllin is situated in the German-Polish border area 6 km (4 mi) south of Pasewalk and 40 km (25 mi) west of Szczecin, in the borough of Fahrenwalde.

== Architecture ==
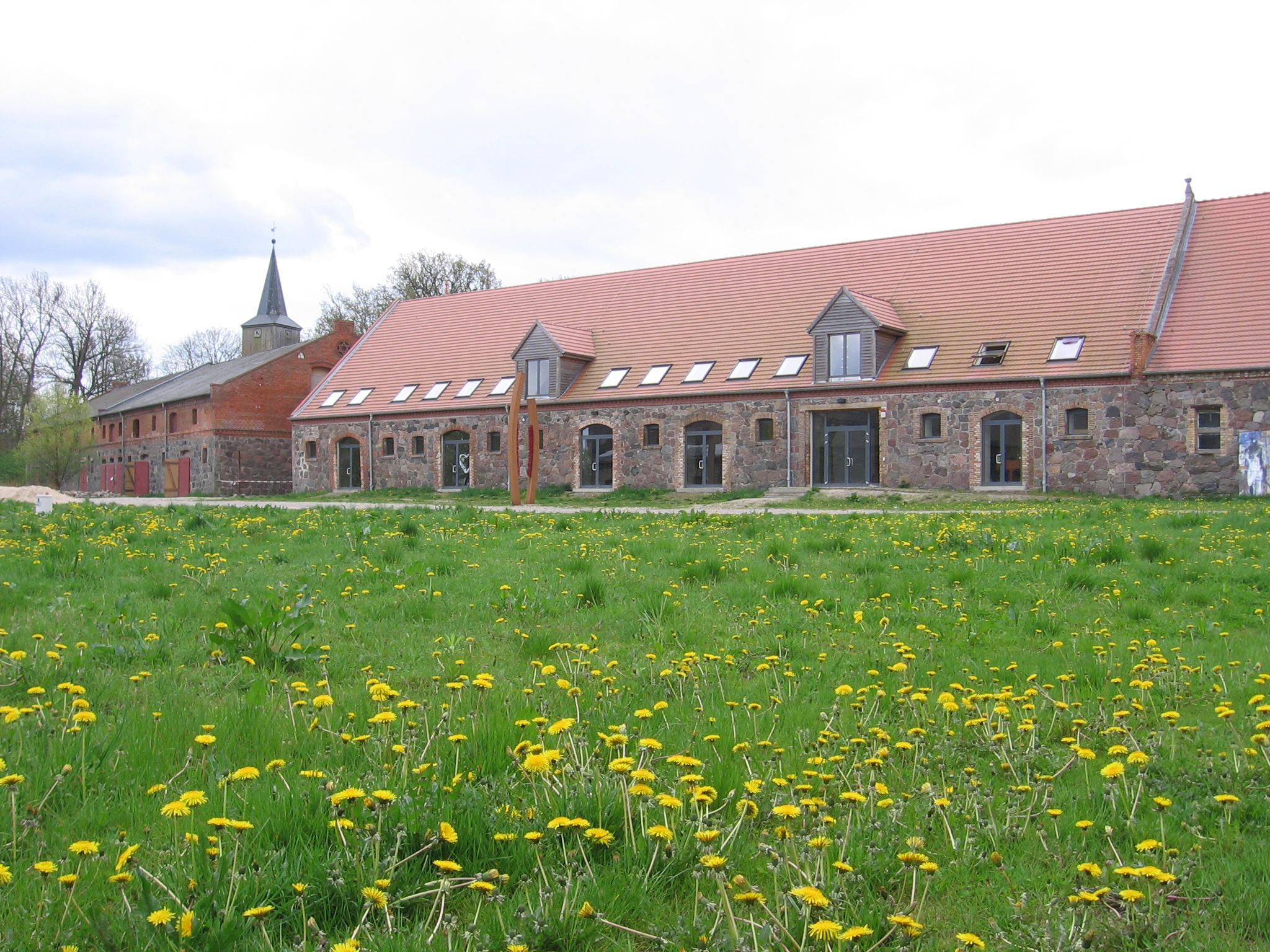
German-Polish Centre in the building of the former bull staple

The estate covers about 50 km^{2} (19 sq mi) of land. The old farm buildings form an enclosed quadrangle with the granary in the centre. Next to it is the old distillery, which was built after Stoewahs purchased the estate in 1854.

The manor house is the oldest building on the estate, situated on the eastern edge. The first part of the building was built at the start of the 18th century, whereas the southern part with the tower was added in 1890. A cobblestone church from 1888 also belongs to the estate, and is part of the Brüssow parish.

Today, the manor houses the permanent residents and volunteers, as well as the administration, offices, the common room and a small library. Behind the manor house, the estate garden looks to the east, and nearby is both the ice cellar and an old beehive.

The former sheep stable stretches 100 m (328 ft) along the northern edge, and is mainly used as a storage space. On the western end is a workshop and the former riding hall with concrete floor and high ceiling.

To the south, the former bull stable is now the German-Polish Centre, which was fully renovated in 2005–2006 to become a multifunctional centre with facilities for rehearsal, workshops, and conferences. Another former bull stable holds three studio spaces with dance floors, used for rehearsals and productions.

== History ==
=== Early history ===
The first historical references to Bröllin can be traced back to 1233, when it went under the name of Bralin after the signatories at the time. The same family was registered as owners in the land register in 1375, then under the name Brellyn. The land covered 50 'hooves', which corresponds to the current area of Bröllin. Between 1375 and 1738 the estate belonged to the von Lindstedt family, who took up residence there from 1400. After the young B.H. von Lindstedt deserted from the army, Frederick William I of Prussia gave the estate a von Görne, who sold it onwards to the Prüwer family.

The Prüwers expanded the agricultural activities of Bröllin, and also built the nearby village Friedrichshof, where they settled workers and sheep farmers who paid taxes to Bröllin. It remained under Bröllin until 1931, when it was bought through a communal land settlement society.

In 1854, the land was bought by the Stoewahs family. This was a period of booming agriculture in Germany, and the latest technological developments were used to develop and restructure the estate and the buildings. During this time, it was amongst the most modern agricultural estates in the entire region. Most of the farm buildings, as well as the distillery, stem from this period.

=== GDR/LPG ===
After the Second World War, land reforms restructured the German countryside, and former properties were distributed to different groups and individuals for farming purposes The Schloss Bröllin estate was run by various production cooperatives (LPGs), with 2500 animals and 300 employees. After the upheavals in 1990, the LPGs were out-phased, and the estate became the responsibility of the Treuhandsanstalt.

=== Today ===
In 1992, the newly founded non-profit schloss bröllin association rented the estate from the Treuhand and began renovation work to transform the place into a production centre for performing arts. It aims to participate in regional and international networks, to carry out youth work and workshops, and to be a place for artistic production and research. Since 1993, the estate has been a protected heritage site, which was bought by the schloss bröllin association in 2000. The association also works to maintain the buildings and surrounding lands.

Today, the estate goes by the name of Schloss Bröllin: international art research location. It is owned and maintained by the schloss bröllin association, and is run by a combination of employees and volunteers. Many of the volunteers come through the European Voluntary Service programme and regional initiatives. The association is supported by the German Federal Cultural Foundation the Ministry of Education, Science and Culture of Mecklenburg-Vorpommern, the District Vorpommern-Greifswald, LAG Soziokulturl MV e.V., the Foundation for German-Polish cooperation and the Centre for Political Education and collaborates with a number of regional networks and initiatives.

During the summer months, Bröllin hosts a number of artists and groups as part of their residential programme. Workshops, artistic projects, youth groups, conferences and other events are regularly hosted, and more than 500 works of dance, theatre and performance have been produced fully or partly in Schloss Bröllin.

== Residential artists ==
From 1992 to 1996, the RA.M.M. Theater led by Arthur Kuggeleyn was based in Bröllin and played an important part in the early development of the estate as a place for arts and culture. Other groups and individuals including POPE, Ziguri Ego Zoo (Anna Totó Company since 2001), tatoeba-theatre danse grotesque, Daniel Weissrot, Delta Rai, Martin Mengdehl, Yumiko Yoshoíoka, Joaxhim Manger and Jens Femerling have left their mark in the years that followed.
