= Ultimate Tazer Ball =

Sport where players are armed with stun devices

Ultimate Tazer Ball, also known as UTB and UTB Live, is an extreme sport involving the use of stun devices.

== History ==
UTB was conceptualized by Leif Kellenberger, Eric Prumm and Erik Wunsch during a paintball conference in Chicago in 2011, who went on to host its first tournament in California. Shortly thereafter, the sport experienced a spike in media coverage. In March of 2012, UTB made its way to Bangkok with an exhibition match at the PAC Sports Centre. No sizable UTB tournaments have been held since 2012, and the official league website no longer exists.

== Gameplay ==
Two teams compete to get a large (24-inch diameter) ball into the goal at the opposite end of a 200 x 85-foot field. Players on each team are equipped with stun guns, and are allowed to use the stun guns on opposing players who are in possession of the ball. The stun devices used emit a current of three to five milliamps, theoretically sufficient to cause a localized muscle spasm but no permanent damage to any of the body's vital organs.
