= Jens Knossalla =

German entertainer and television presenter (born 1986)

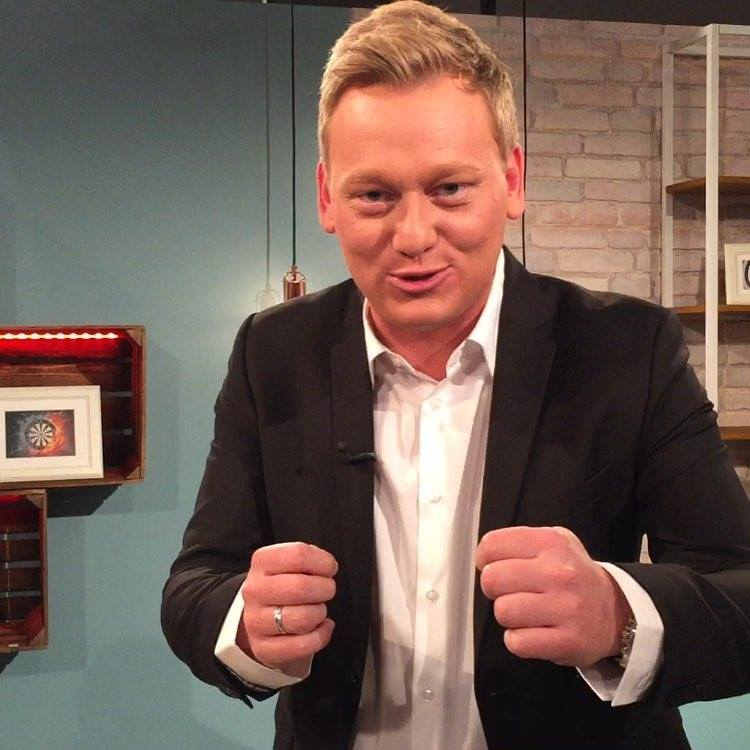
- Knossalla in 2017
- Born: Jens Heinz Richard Knossalla; 7 July 1986 (age 40); Malsch, Karlsruhe, West Germany
- Other name: Knossi (stage name)
- Occupations: Entertainer, TV presenter
- Years active: 2009-present
- Children: 1
- Website: knossi.de

Jens Heinz Richard Knossalla (born 7 July 1986), also known online by his stage name Knossi, is a German entertainer and television presenter. He became known for his participation in various television formats and as a poker commentator, presenter and live streamer. Knossalla describes himself as König des Internets ("King of the Internet") and usually appears with a crown these days.

== Career ==
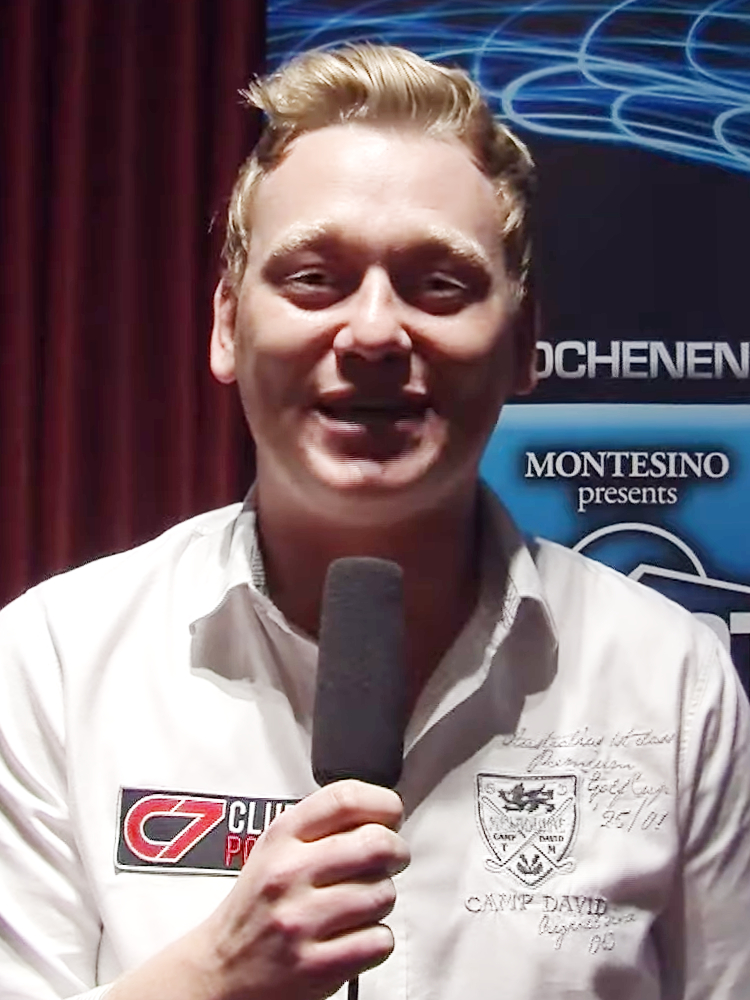
Knossalla as a presenter in the Montesino Card Casino in Vienna, 2012

Knossalla had his first television appearance in 2009 as a participant in the game show WipeOut – Heul nicht, lauf! on ProSieben. In 2010, he was seen on the TV format Der Kreuzfahrtkönig broadcast on RTL II. In 2011, Knossalla took part on the game show 17 Meter hosted by Joko Winterscheidt and Klaas Heufer-Umlauf. In 2012 Knossalla was a live reporter at the World Series of Poker for the German poker site PokerToday interviewing the worlds biggest poker players and stars. In November 2012, he was seen on VOX as part of the reality series mieten, kaufen, wohnen. In addition, Knossalla played several small roles in the scripted reality series Richter Alexander Hold, Richterin Barbara Salesch, Lenßen & Partner, K11 – Kommissare im Einsatz, Verklag mich doch! and in the soap opera Gute Zeiten, schlechte Zeiten.

In November 2020, Knossalla hosted the fourth episode of the late-night show Täglich frisch geröstet on TVNOW, produced by Stefan Raab. In addition to Knossalla as the "host" and Mark Filatov as a guest, Kai Pflaume appeared in the role of the "roaster".

== Personal life ==
Knossala was born on 7 July 1986 in Malsch, Karlsruhe, Baden-Württemberg. He is the father of a son born in 2019.

== Filmography ==
- 2020: Kartoffelsalat 3 – Das Musical

== Bibliography ==
- Knossi. König des Internets. Über meinen Aufstieg und Erfolg als Streamer. Riva, München 2020, ISBN 978-3-96775-007-2 (with eleven guest conttibutions by Robin Schulz among others).
