= Joko Winterscheidt =

German television host, producer and actor

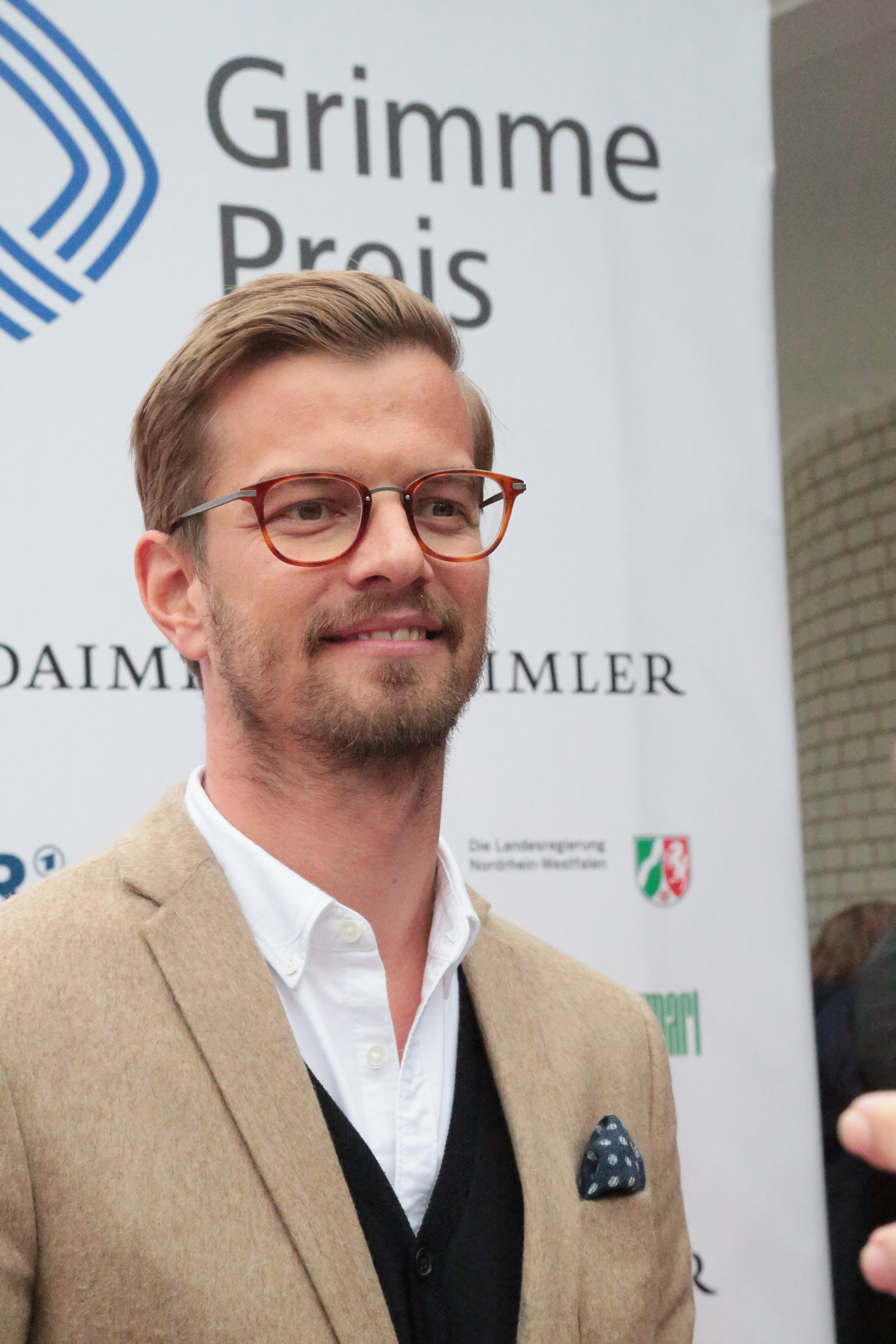
- Winterscheidt at the Grimme Awards 2018
- Born: Joachim Winterscheidt; 13 January 1979 (age 47); Mönchengladbach, West Germany
- Occupations: Television host; producer
- Years active: 2005–present
- Children: 2
- Awards: See Awards

Joachim "Joko" Winterscheidt (born 13 January 1979) is a German television host, producer and actor. He became known as part of the duo Joko & Klaas alongside Klaas Heufer-Umlauf in TV programs like Circus HalliGalli.

Winterscheidt grew up in Waldniel. Since 2005, he is a presenter at MTV Germany. Since 2010, he is an employee of TV productions company Endemol, along with Heufer-Umlauf. Having previously lived in Berlin, he and his family moved to Munich in 2015.

== Works ==
=== Filmography ===
==== Television ====
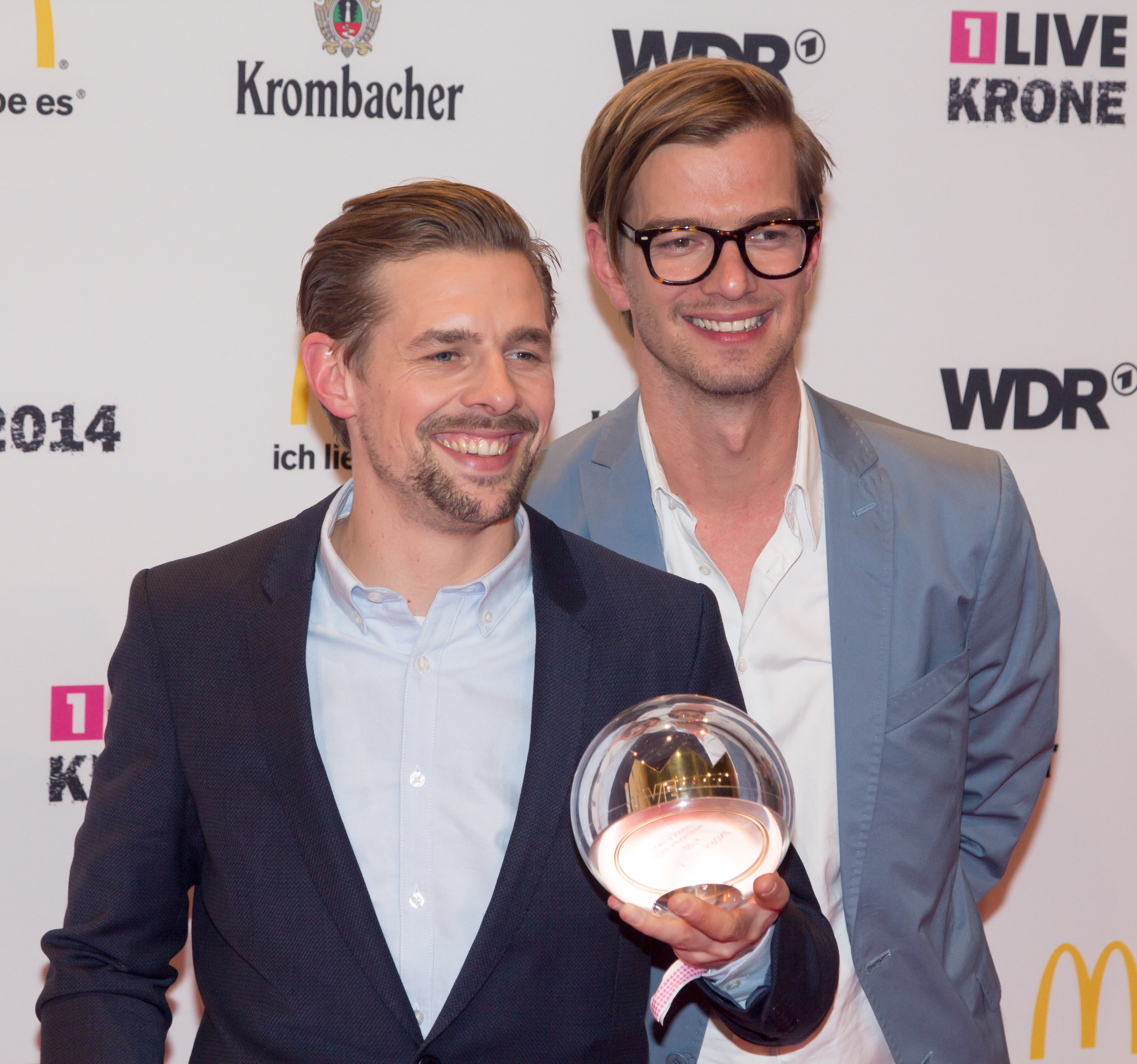
Winterscheidt (right) and Klaas Heufer-Umlauf in 2014

- 2005–2006: Total Request Live
- 23. Juli 2007: Schmeckt nicht, gibt's nicht along with Tim Mälzer
- 2006–2008: HotSports (MTV)
- 2006–2008: Jokos Roadtrip (MTV)
- 2008–2010: The Dome
- 2009: Yes We Can Dance! (Sat.1) as judge
- 2009–2011: MTV Home along with Klaas Heufer-Umlauf
- 2010: Beck's Most Wanted Music (MTV)
- 2010: Pringles Xtreme TV
- 2010–2012: Ahnungslos along with Klaas Heufer-Umlauf
- 2011: Echo 2011 moderation with Ina Müller
- 2011: TVLab (ZDFneo)
- 2011–2012: 17 Meter along with Klaas Heufer-Umlauf
- 2011–2013: neoParadise along with Klaas Heufer-Umlauf
- 2011: Joko & Klaas – Die Rechnung geht auf uns along with Klaas Heufer-Umlauf
- 2011–2012: 1 Live Beeck und Winterscheidt – Die tägliche Nachmittagsschau auf 1Live
- Silvester 2011/2012: Willkommen 2012 – Silvester live vom Brandenburger Tor along with Mirjam Weichselbraun and Klaas Heufer-Umlauf
- since 2012: Joko gegen Klaas – Das Duell um die Welt along with Klaas Heufer-Umlauf (ProSieben)
- Silvester 2012/2013: Willkommen 2013 – Silvester live vom Brandenburger Tor along with Mirjam Weichselbraun and Klaas Heufer-Umlauf
- 2013–2017: Circus HalliGalli along with Klaas Heufer-Umlauf (ProSieben)
- 2014–2016: Mein bester Feind along with Klaas Heufer-Umlauf (ProSieben)
- 2015: 20 Jahre Akte: Das große Spezial mit Joko und Klaas along with Klaas Heufer-Umlauf and Ulrich Meyer (Sat.1)
- 2015–2017: Teamwork – Spiel mit deinem Star along with Klaas Heufer-Umlauf
- 2016: My Idiot Friend (ProSieben) along with Klaas Heufer-Umlauf
- 2016–2017, since 2024: Duell um die Geld (ProSieben/Joyn) along with Klaas Heufer-Umlauf and Oliver Kalkofe
- 2016–2019: Die beste Show der Welt (ProSieben) along with Klaas Heufer-Umlauf
- 2017–2018: Die Promi-Darts-WM (ProSieben)
- 2017–2018: Beginner gegen Gewinner ("Beginner vs. Winner") (ProSieben)
- 2018: jerks. (ProSieben, 1 episode)
- 2018: Win Your Song (ProSieben)
- 2018–2020: Das Ding des Jahres (ProSieben) as judge
- 2018–2019: Weihnachten mit Joko und Klaas (ProSieben) with Klaas Heufer-Umlauf
- since 2019: Joko & Klaas gegen ProSieben (ProSieben) with Klaas Heufer-Umlauf
  - 2020: Männerwelten (ProSieben) as producer
  - 2021: Pflege Ist #NichtSelbstverständlich (ProSieben) as producer
- 2019: Taff (ProSieben) with Klaas Heufer-Umlauf
- 2019: Das Traumschiff – Antigua (ZDF)
- 2020: Das Traumschiff – Kapstadt (ZDF)
- since 2021: Wer stiehlt mir die Show? (ProSieben)
- 2021: red. (ProSieben) with Klaas Heufer-Umlauf
- 2023: The World's Most Dangerous Show (Amazon Prime)
- since 2025: Ein sehr gutes Quiz (mit hoher Gewinnsumme) (ProSieben) along with Klaas Heufer-Umlauf
- 2025: Comedy Allstars (ProSieben)

==== Films ====
- 2013: Battle of the Year
- 2015: The Manny
- 2015: Look Who's Back (cameo)
- 2017: Sharknado 5: Global Swarming

==== Voice actor ====
- 2012: Tim and Eric's Billion Dollar Movie
- 2012: The Pirates! In an Adventure with Scientists!
- 2017: Despicable Me 3 (Balthazar Bratt, German voice-over)

=== Discography ===
==== Singles ====
- 2014: U-Bahn-Ficker (along with Eko Fresh and Klaas Heufer-Umlauf)

=== Podcasts ===
- 2017-2021: Alle Wege führen nach Ruhm with Paul Ripke
- Since 2023: Sunset Club with Sophie Passmann

== Awards ==
1 Live Krone

- 2014: Sonderpreis (with Klaas Heufer-Umlauf)

Blauer Panther

- 2022: Entertainment for Wer stiehlt mir die Show? (with Julia Mehnert)
- 2023: Most Popular Entertainment Programme for Joko & Klaas gegen ProSieben
- 2023: Culture/Education for The World's Most Dangerous Show

Brillenträger des Jahres

- 2015

Deutscher Comedypreis

- 2013: Beste Comedyshow für Circus HalliGalli (with Klaas Heufer-Umlauf)

Deutscher Fernsehpreis

- 2012: Exceptional Performance in Entertainment (with Klaas Heufer-Umlauf)
- 2014: Best Show Host (Audience award, with Klaas Heufer-Umlauf)
- 2016: Best Entertainment Primetime for Joko gegen Klaas – Das Duell um die Welt (with Klaas Heufer-Umlauf)
- 2017: Best Entertainment Primetime for Die beste Show der Welt (with Klaas Heufer-Umlauf)
- 2021: Best Infotainment for Joko & Klaas – Live: Pflege ist #NichtSelbstverständlich (with Klaas Heufer-Umlauf)
- 2021: Best Entertainment Show for Wer stiehlt mir die Show?
- 2022: Best Entertainment Show for Wer stiehlt mir die Show?
- 2023: Best Documentary Series for The World's Most Dangerous Show
- 2024: Best Host/Individual Performance Entertainment for 24 Stunden mit Joko & Klaas (with Klaas Heufer-Umlauf)
- 2025: Best Entertainment Show for Ein sehr gutes Quiz (mit hoher Gewinnsumme)

ECHO

- 2014: Partner des Jahres for Circus HalliGalli (with Klaas Heufer-Umlauf)

Goldene Henne

- 2019: Entertainment for Alle Wege führen nach Ruhm (with Paul Ripke)
- 2021: Entertainment for Wer stiehlt mir die Show?

Grimme-Preis

- 2014: Unterhaltung for Circus HalliGalli (with Klaas Heufer-Umlauf)
- 2018: Unterhaltung for #Gosling-Gate (with Circus HalliGalli)
- 2020: Unterhaltung for Joko & Klaas LIVE – 15 Minuten (Staffel 1, with Thomas Martiens, Thomas Schmitt and Klaas Heufer-Umlauf)
- 2022: Unterhaltung for Wer stiehlt mir die Show? (with Jakob Lundt, Julia Mehnert, Thomas Schmitt and Christin Schneider)

Nannen-Preis

- 2021: Special Award for A Short Story of Moria and Männerwelten (with Klaas Heufer-Umlauf, Sophie Passmann, Thomas Schmitt, Arne Kreutzfeldt, Claudia Schölzel, and Thomas Martiens)

NRW-Medienpreis für entwicklungspolitisches Engagement

- 2023: The World's Most Dangerous Show

Radio Regenbogen Award

- 2017: Medienmänner 2016 (with Klaas Heufer-Umlauf)

Rose d’Or

- 2014: Entertainment für Circus HalliGalli (with Klaas Heufer-Umlauf)
