= Klaas Heufer-Umlauf =

German television host, producer, actor and singer

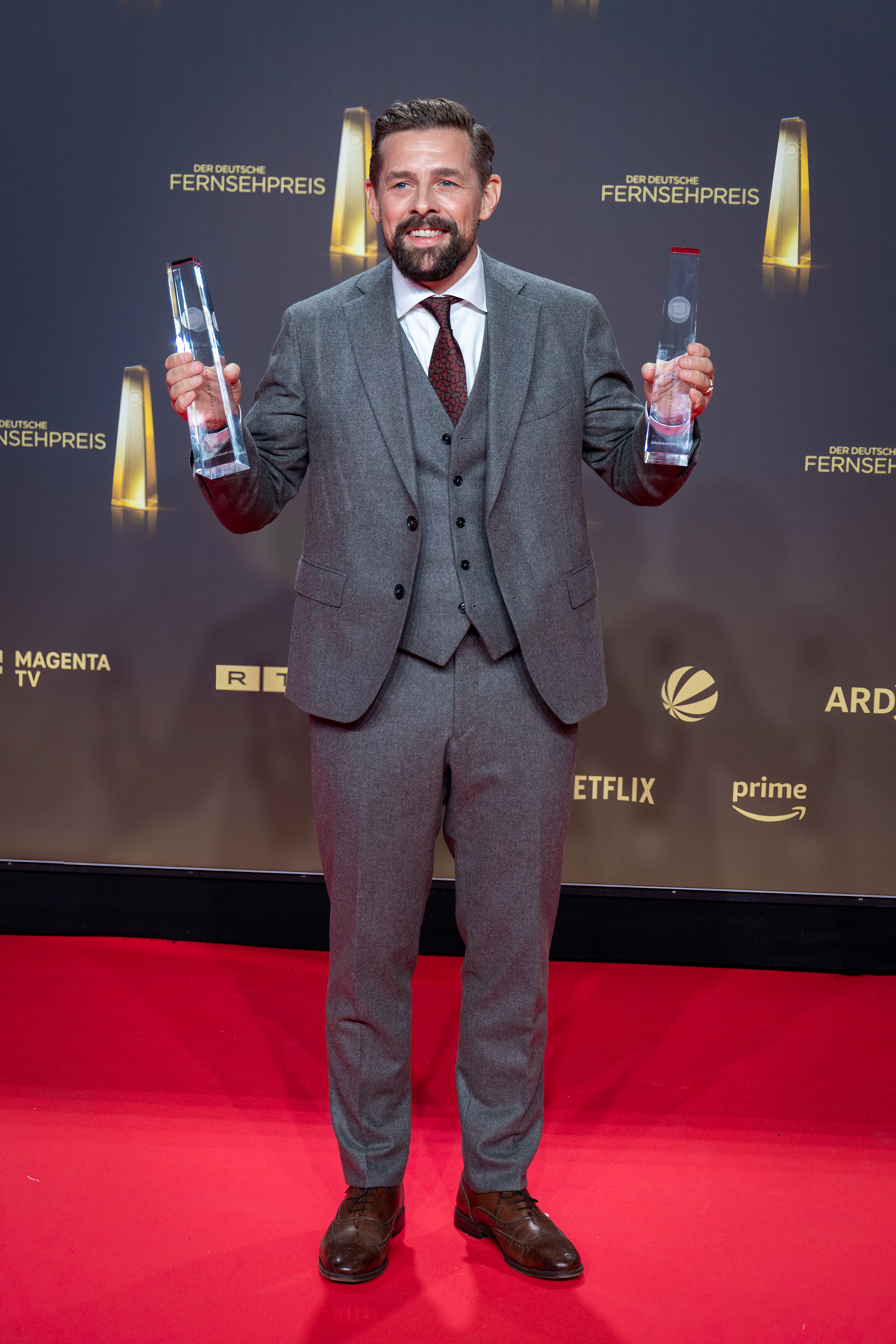
- Heufer-Umlauf in 2024
- Born: 22 September 1983 (age 43); Oldenburg, West Germany
- Occupations: Television host; Producer; Actor; Singer
- Known for: MTV Home; Late Night Berlin
- Partner: Doris Golpashin (2012–)
- Children: 2
- Awards: See Awards

Klaas Heufer-Umlauf (born 22 September 1983 in Oldenburg) is a German television host, producer, actor and singer. He is best known as part of the duo Joko & Klaas, alongside Joko Winterscheidt.

== Biography ==
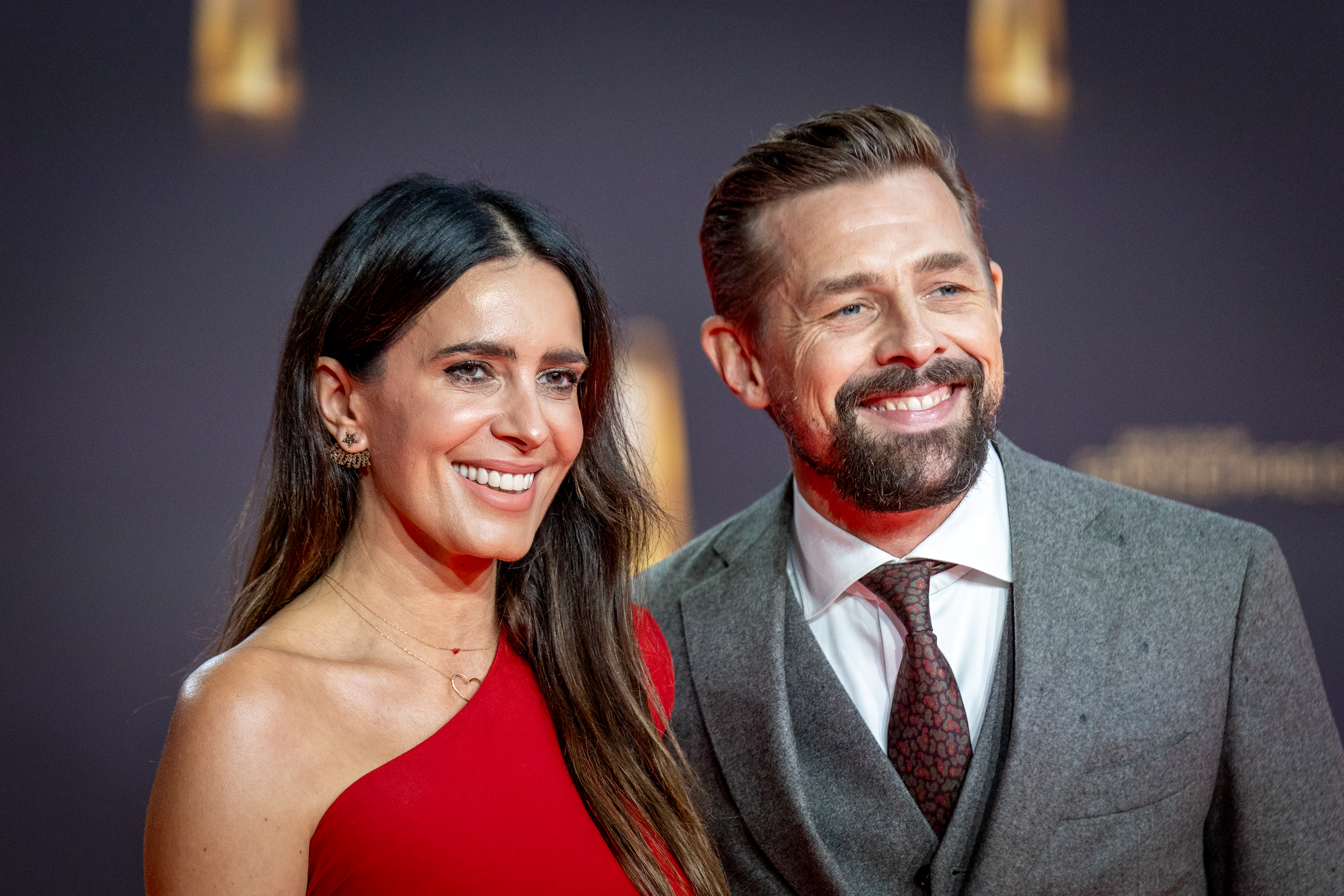
Heufer-Umlauf next to his partner Doris Golpashin in 2024

Heufer-Umlauf is a trained hairdresser. After he won a casting, he started his career as a TV host in VIVA Live!, Retro Charts, and Klaas' Wochenshow. He appeared in the sitcom Alle lieben Jimmy on RTL and the music video "And No Matches" by Scooter. From June 2009 to March 2011, Heufer-Umlauf co-hosted the late-night talk show MTV Home with Joko Winterscheidt on MTV Germany. From October 2011 to January 2013, they co-hosted NeoParadise on ZDFneo, which is considered a successor of MTV Home.

Since 2011, Joko and Klaas have hosted several shows on ProSieben, including the game shows 17 Meter, Die Rechnung geht auf uns, and Joko gegen Klaas - Das Duell um die Welt. In February 2013, they started the show Circus HalliGalli (2013–2017) on ProSieben, a successor of MTV Home and neoParadise. Later that year, Heufer-Umlauf starred in the film Grossstadtklein, along with Jacob Matschenz and Kostja Ullmann.

Heufer-Umlauf is the founder and singer of the band Gloria. In September 2013, the band's first album was released.

Since 2012, Heufer-Umlauf has been dating Austrian TV host Doris Golpashin. Their first child was born on 14 April 2013, and second child was born in 2018.

== Works ==
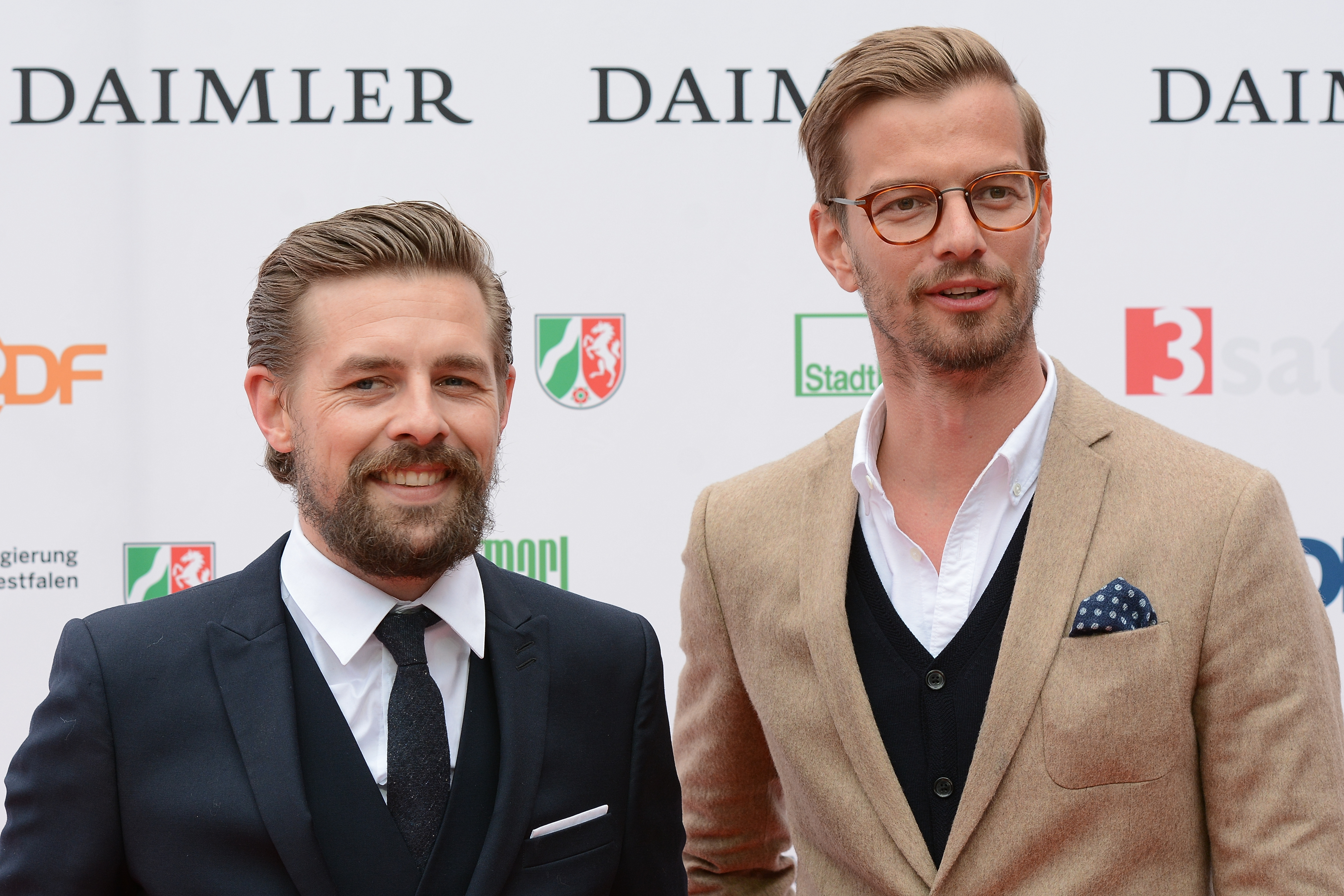
Heufer-Umlauf next to Joko Winterscheidt in 2018

=== Filmography ===
==== Films ====
- 2006: Altwarp-Neuwarp (short film)
- 2006: Im Leben eine Eins
- 2007: Familienschaukel (short film)
- 2008: Die Folgen der Schwangerschaft einer Kampfrichterin (short film)
- 2008: Für immer ist das Edelweiß
- 2010: Come Back Home (short film)
- 2010: Riss (short film)
- 2011: Woman in Love
- 2013: Grossstadtklein
- 2013: Battle of the Year
- 2014: Dear Courtney
- 2014: Coming In
- 2014: Freiland
- 2015: Look Who's Back (Cameo)
- 2015: Meier Müller Schmidt
- 2017: Jürgen – Heute wird gelebt
- 2019: Die Goldfische

==== TV Series ====
- 2018: Jennifer – Sehnsucht nach was Besseres
- 2019: Check Check
- 2023: The Swarm

==== TV shows ====
- 2005: 17 (VIVA)
- 2005–2009: VIVA Live! (VIVA)
- 2006–2009: Klaas' Wochenshow (VIVA)
- 2008: Show der Woche mit Oliver Geissen (RTL)
- 2008: Retro Charts (VIVA)
- 2009: Mascerade – Deutschland verbiegt sich (ProSieben)
- 2009: Superspots – die besten Clips im Umlauf (ProSieben)
- 2009–2011: MTV Home (MTV)
- 2010: Beck's Most Wanted Music (MTV)
- 2010–2012: Ahnungslos (ProSieben)
- 2010: Pringles Xtreme.tv
- 2011–2012: 17 Meter (ProSieben)
- 2011: TVLab (ZDFneo)
- 2011–2013: neoParadise (ZDFneo)
- 2011: Joko & Klaas – Die Rechnung geht auf uns (ProSieben)
- since 2012: Joko gegen Klaas – Das Duell um die Welt (ProSieben)
- 2013–2017: Circus HalliGalli (ProSieben)
- 2014–2016: Mein bester Feind (ProSieben)
- since 2015: Teamwork – Spiel mit deinem Star (ProSieben)
- 2016–2017: Das Duell um die Geld (ProSieben)
- since 2016: Die beste Show der Welt (ProSieben)
- 2016: My Idiot Friend (ProSieben)
- since 2018: Late Night Berlin (ProSieben)
- since 2018: Weihnachten mit Joko und Klaas (ProSieben)
- since 2019: Joko & Klaas gegen ProSieben (ProSieben)
- 2019: Taff (ProSieben)
- since 2025: Ein sehr gutes Quiz (mit hoher Gewinnsumme) (ProSieben) along with Joko Winterscheidt

==== Documentaries ====
- 2011: Finding Brave (ProSieben)

==== Radio ====
- 2007–2009: Klaas' Kosmos (Bremen Vier)
- 2011: Zwei alte Hasen erzählen von Früher (Radio Eins)

=== Discography ===
==== Singles ====
- 2014: U-Bahn-Ficker (with Eko Fresh and Joko Winterscheidt)
- 2018: Smart Home H**rensohn (with 101 ASSIstentenbande)
- 2018: Klaas Fußballsong (Ich schau Fußball an) (with Gloria)
- 2019: Clans for Future (feat. Clan Allstars)
- 2019: Die Gang ist mein Team (with Capital Bra)
- 2019: We Love to Entertain You (with Joko Winterscheidt)

Additional singles with Gloria

== Awards ==
1Live Krone

- 2014: Sonderpreis (with Joko Winterscheidt)

Deutscher Comedypreis

- 2013: Beste Comedyshow for Circus HalliGalli (with Joko Winterscheidt)

Deutscher Fernsehpreis

- 2012: Besondere Leistung Unterhaltung (with Joko Winterscheidt)
- 2014: Bester Show-Moderator (Publikumspreis, with Joko Winterscheidt)
- 2016: Beste Unterhaltung Primetime for Joko gegen Klaas – Das Duell um die Welt (with Joko Winterscheidt)
- 2017: Beste Unterhaltung Primetime for Die beste Show der Welt (with Joko Winterscheidt)

Echo (Musikpreis)

- 2014: Partner des Jahres for Circus HalliGalli (with Joko Winterscheidt)

Gentlemen's Quarterly (GQ-Awards)

- 2012: Fernsehen

Grimme Online Award

- 2008: Initiator & Autor stoerungsmelder.org

Grimme-Preis

- 2014: Unterhaltung for Circus HalliGalli (with Joko Winterscheidt)
- 2018: Unterhaltung for #Gosling-Gate (with Circus HalliGalli)
- 2020: Unterhaltung for Joko & Klaas LIVE – 15 Minuten (Season 1, with Thomas Martiens, Thomas Schmitt and Joko Winterscheidt)

NCB Hörerpreis (Newcomer Contest Bayern)

- 2014

Radio Regenbogen Award

- 2017: Medienmänner 2016 (with Joko Winterscheidt)

Rose d’Or

- 2014: Entertainment für Circus HalliGalli (with Joko Winterscheidt)
