= Schwiegertochter gesucht =

- Genre: docusoap
- Presented by: Vera Int-Veen
- Opening theme: Fools Garden - Man of Devotion
- Country of origin: Germany
- Original language: German
- No. of episodes: 78 in 9+ seasons (+ 11 special episodes)

Production
- Producer: Warner Bros. International Television Production Deutschland GmbH
- Production company: RTL

Original release
- Release: 15 April 2007 – 2 October 2016

Schwiegertochter gesucht (German: "Wanted: Daughter-in-law") is a German-language docusoap broadcast by RTL. It is produced by the Cologne-based company Warner Bros. International Television Production Deutschland GmbH and presented by Vera Int-Veen. The program was first broadcast on 5 April 2007 and its ninth season began on 23 August 2015.

Since 12 February 2012 the Schwiegertochter gesucht special Jetzt sind die Frauen dran ("Now it's the women's turn") is occasionally broadcast.

== Concept ==
The central premise of the show has bachelors inviting women they have never met to live at home with them for several days. Most of these men still live with their mothers and the central role of the mothers in the drama is the basis of the show's name. The couple is accompanied during the entire time by a camera crew and by Vera Int-Veen, the presenter of the program, via voice-over comments and explanations about what has transpired.

== Criticism ==
Criticism of the show mainly focuses on the fact that is purely for entertainment value and appears to edit the raw footage in order to make the participants look ridiculous.

"Instead of affectionate observations of minor everyday occurrences, the show's parade of oddities is reminiscent of the people you see at the circus - and when every scene is read from scripted cue cards, it probably doesn't have much to do with the real life of the contestants." - Judith Conrady: RP Online

=== #Verafake ===
During the 12 May 2016 episode of Neo Magazin Royale, host Jan Böhmermann introduced the hashtag #verafake and announced that Robin, a 21-year old contestant featured in the 10 April 2016 broadcast of Schwiegertochter gesucht, was actually a 30-year-old actor named Simon Steinhorst. His supposed 38-year old father René was played by 55-year-old actor Andreas Schneider. The Neo Magazin Royale team had rented an apartment in Duisburg and furnished it to match the contestant's backstory. Their report included hidden camera footage of the production company at work and revealed that the contestant gets an allowance of 150 euros for 10 to 30 days of shooting, while noting that RTL earns up to 90,000 euros per minute during commercial breaks during broadcast of the program. Additionally, candidates are obligated to sign an affidavit that they are in full possession of their mental faculties. Although the supposed father character René claimed on-camera that he drank eight bottles of beer a day, he claimed in a questionnaire he did not consume alcohol. Contestants did not receive copies of the signed contract until after the episode was broadcast.

When asked by the media magazine DWDL.de about the report, RTL spokesman Christian Körner said it was necessary first to examine the broadcast sequence and consult with the producers before making public comment. RTL then removed the episode featuring the fake contestants from its library of available shows. At the same time they denied part of the allegations, arguing that the contract had been repeatedly sent to the contestant's known address but had not been signed for, and that the 150 euro allowance corresponded to the monthly basic allowance for persons receiving unemployment benefits. Later RTL conceded that "errors in editorial diligence were made" and announced that the production team for the current season would be replaced.

As a result of the revelations, the Lower Saxony State Media Authority (NLM) launched an investigation. NLM Director Andreas Fischer criticized "the way the production company negotiates contracts with the contestants and badgers them, which is reminiscent of door-to-door salespeople." The NLM officially requested copies of the contracts sent by the production company Warner Bros. International Television Production Germany to contestants.

"You've made Robin and his father even dumber than we intended. And that's saying something. You've cast them as the ultimate idiots." - Jan Böhmermann: Neo Magazine Royale

== Links ==
- Official Schwiegertochter gesucht site by RTL
- Schwiegertochter gesucht at IMDb
- "Schwiegertochter gesucht" from nowtv.de
- Episode on Schwiegertochter gesucht from Neo Magazin Royale (Video)
