= Menschen Leben Tanzen Welt =

Song by Jim Pandzko featuring Jan Böhmermann
- Released: 6 April 2017
- Genre: Pop music
- Length: 3:20
- Label: Neo Magazin Royale (ZDF Enterprises)
- Composers: Bono Beau, Olaf Utan
- Lyricist: Jim Pandzko
- Producers: Alex Werth, Niko Faust

"Menschen Leben Tanzen Welt" (English: "People Life Dance World") is a song by the German satirist Jan Böhmermann. It was presented as part of the TV show Neo Magazin Royale on 6 April 2017 and released on the same day.

The song makes fun of vapid pop lyrics and product placement in music videos. Its lyrics consist of advertising slogans, celebrity tweets, and common idioms or sayings; the song was "written" by chimpanzees.

The song ended up in the German single charts.

== Background ==
On 6 April 2017, Böhmermann criticised the German pop industry and the Echo Award ceremony, which was planned for the next day, on his show Neo Magazin Royale. The 20-minute long monologue had already been released on YouTube the day before. Among other things, he criticized Max Giesinger, Tim Bendzko and Matthias Schweighöfer who, according to Böhmermann, did not write their own lyrics and focused more on the revenue their songs could earn rather than meaningful content. He refers to them as the "new German pop poets" and claims that their songs have "trivial lyrics," sounding like "advertising messages". Furthermore, their music videos contain numerous product placements. To prove how standardised and replaceable German pop songs are, Böhmermann and his production team collected advertising slogans, phrases from current pop songs and tweets of the German YouTubers Bianca Heinicke and Sami Slimani. These text fragments were then randomly put together at ZOOM Erlebniswelt Gelsenkirchen by five chimpanzees, creating the finished song lyrics. The pseudonym "Jim Pandzko," a pun made up of "Tim Bendzko" and "chimpanzee," was used to identify the song's singer. The songwriters registered with GEMA, Bono Beau and Olaf Utan, are also word plays made up of "Bonobo" and "Orangutan", too.

"Menschen Leben Tanzen Welt" was recorded at Studio Debussy in Essen. Audio mixing was done at Klangwelt Studio, also in Essen. Böhmermann's aim is that the song will win the Echo Award 2018. All revenues will go to the Rheinische Musikschule in Cologne.

== Music and content ==
"Menschen Leben Tanzen Welt" is composed in verse–chorus form with content from different, randomly combined text fragments. Böhmermann says that the words in the title Menschen (English: people), Leben (life), Tanzen (dance) and Welt (world) describe the four most-used themes in German pop music. In addition, the chorus uses the lyrics "Oh oh eh oh oh" to make remembering and singing along to the song easier.

== Reception and reactions ==
The media responded positively to "Menschen Leben Tanzen Welt". Stern wrote: "you cannot illustrate the state of German pop music in 2017 any better than with a song that was written in such a short time and composed by apes." In a review which discusses the satirical vein of the song, Musikexpress claims that the song is the most emotional one you can listen to today and is unusually catchy.

The singer of the German band Die Toten Hosen, Campino, said during the 2017 Echo Award Ceremony in a reference to the video: "It's better to be uncool than a cool asshole, who cannot be constructive in any way." He also talked about the "Böhmermann Zeitgeist banter". Böhmermann responded on his Facebook page, still impersonating a rising young musician, with empty phrases and quotes from songs of German pop poets and Die Toten Hosen. Max Giesinger says that he "can see the humour in the video."

== Commercial success ==
Shortly after its release, "Menschen Leben Tanzen Welt" temporarily reached number one on the German iTunes- and Amazon-charts. One day later, the song entered the official German charts in 84th place. In its second week on the charts, it broke into the top ten reaching 10th place. It is Böhmermann's second top ten success in Germany following "Ich hab Polizei". During its third week on the charts, "Menschen Leben Tanzen Welt" dropped to 33rd place and was not listed in the charts after that. The Ö3 Austria Top 40 charts listed the song in 46th place for one week.

| Charts | Highest Ranking | Weeks |
|---|---|---|
| Germany | 10 | 3 |
| Austria | 46 | 1 |

== Music video ==
The video for "Menschen Leben Tanzen Welt" shows Böhmermann singing while dressed similarly to Max Giesinger in his video for "Wenn sie tanzt". This is interrupted by sections of stock footage film material. Another element is the aggressive product placement of an imaginary soft drink brand Glump.
