= Fest & Flauschig =

German satirical podcast (2016–)

- Genre: Talk
- Country of origin: Germany
- Language: German

Cast and voices
- Hosted by: Jan Böhmermann Olli Schulz

Production
- Length: 30 to 120 minutes

Publication
- Original release: 15 May 2016
- Provider: Spotify

Related
- Website: www.festundflauschig.de

Fest & Flauschig (German for Firm & Fluffy) is a German audio podcast hosted by satirist Jan Böhmermann and musician Olli Schulz. It was launched in May 2016 on Spotify as a successor of the radio show Sanft & Sorgfältig (German for Gentle & Thorough). It was Spotify's most successful podcast worldwide during 2017.

== History ==
Fest & Flauschig spiritually began as Sanft & Sorgfältig on the Berlin radio station Radio Eins, which ran from 9 September 2012 until 24 April 2016. The production was suspended in spring 2016 due to the Böhmermann affair. Later, on 25 April 2016, the hosts announced on Facebook that Sanft & Sorgfältig would be discontinued. Shortly afterwards Spotify announced that Schulz and Böhmermann will start a podcast under new name.

In May 2019, Spotify announced that the podcast had been extended for three more seasons until 2022.

== Content ==
The podcast consists of Böhmermann and Schulz discussing current political and societal affairs, personal events, and fictional events. Some recurring bits include Die großen Fünf (German for The Big Five) and Partyhopping.

In the radio show, the discussions would be regularly interrupted with music. In the podcast, it is technically not possible; instead the hosts provide a separate playlist, called Fidi & Bumsi on Spotify.

New episodes of the podcast are available every Sunday at midnight CET. As of January 2020, on Wednesdays a second, shorter episode is available. During the Coronavirus disease 2019 outbreak in Germany and the accompanying lockdown, the number of weekly episodes increased temporarily to five. Virologist Christian Drosten was one of the guests during this time.

== Reception ==
The podcast is estimated to have a few hundred thousand listeners.
