= Neo Magazin Royale =

German late-night talk show

- Genre: Late-night talk show
- Presented by: Jan Böhmermann
- Country of origin: Germany
- Original language: German
- No. of seasons: 5 (Neo Magazin Royale); 3 (Neo Magazin)
- No. of episodes: 166 (Neo Magazin Royale); 28 (Neo Magazin)

Production
- Running time: 30–45 minutes (inc. commercials)
- Production company: Bildundtonfabrik (btf GmbH)

Original release
- Network: ZDFneo
- Release: 31 October 2013 – 12 December 2019

Neo Magazin Royale is a German satirical late-night talk show hosted by Jan Böhmermann. Produced in Cologne, it has been aired weekly on the ZDFneo channel since 31 October 2013. It is also made available in advance on the online ZDFmediathek internet page, with some segments uploaded to YouTube.

Originally called Neo Magazin, the suffix Royale was added starting with the broadcast on 5 February 2015. Since then, the show has been produced in a larger studio and Böhmermann is supported by a live band fronted by rapper Dendemann. Starting with this episode, the current episode is rebroadcast on Friday nights on ZDF as well.

The show is notorious for testing the limits of German free speech laws during the Erdogate controversy in 2016. In 2017, Böhmermann launched a Europe-wide video contest called Every Second Counts, with the videos mocking President Trump. The show is responsible for smuggling a fake contestant into the reality show Schwiegertochter gesucht (#verafake) and producing a fake video of Yanis Varoufakis showing the middle finger (#varoufake). The show has also produced various viral comedic songs.

On 8 September 2020, it was announced that the show would be returning to ZDF, starting 5 November 2020. Böhmermann's new program called ZDF Magazin Royale started on 6 November 2020 on ZDF.

== Format ==
Neo Magazin Royale opens with a musical intro, which is followed by Böhmermann presenting the hashtag of the week and doing a comedy monologue on current events.

The show is made up of recurring segments that are either in-studio pieces moderated by Böhmermann (which occasionally incorporate the audience) or are specially produced films. Often segments have their own intro and outro.

Sometimes the show is headlined by a main topic, which is a deep dive on a social or political issue in the style of Last Week Tonight. Celebrity and political guests also appear in almost every episode.

The show has featured original songs, some of which under the pseudonym "POL1Z1STENS0HN" about Böhmermann's "thug life" being a policeman's son, mocking German gangsta rap. POL1Z1STENS0HN's most popular single, Ich hab Polizei, charted at number 10 in the German single charts. Menschen Leben Tanzen Welt also charted at number 10 and is about meaningless pop lyrics. Baby got Laugengebäck is in English and celebrates a kind of bread roll called a lye roll.

=== Recurring segments ===
These sections are a regular part of the program, often since the first season of Neo magazine.

- PRISM is a Dancer:

Böhmermann draws the audience's attention to their presence on the internet, which was previously researched. In most cases, the participant receives a suitable present after presenting his presence or is included in a thematically fitting studio action. The title of the segment is a parody of "Rhythm Is a Dancer" by Snap!, also using the chorus as a jingle and alluding to the NSA program PRISM, which became popular by the global surveillance disclosures in 2013.

- Drehscheibe Internet (turntable internet):

Böhmermann first introduces the ASCII character of the week, followed by a top 5 ranking of various topics on the Internet (for example, the five best animated GIF images or the five most popular Wi-Fi names). Often, after the ASCII character of the week, another thing of the month is introduced, such as the emoji of the month or the keyboard layout of the month.

- Trendvulkan Mitte (trend vulcano mitte):

The "hottest" (but fictional) trends from Berlin-Mitte will be presented. In addition, a male and female public viewer will be shown, who allegedly carry the latest "look" from Mitte, which is commented by Böhmermann. In addition, (fictional) youth words are introduced, which refer to historical events.

- Entscheide dich! (make a decision!):

Böhmermann and the guest or the guests have to answer either-or questions drawn from a hat. The questions often consist of puns and are often related to current events or celebrities.

- Bastel Brothers (Craft Brothers):

Marcel Magic and Simon Spectacular present simple crafting ideas in short clips. These mostly consist of everyday objects and resemble with much imagination what they should represent. Examples include a Bobby Car, taped to the back, as a Transformers costume or a tampon, stapled to a sanitary napkin, as a butterfly. In a broadcast several ideas are shown, interrupted by short presentations of Böhmermann.

Each issue has a special subtitle, such as "Karvenal Edition" or "Interim Years Edition".

- Photoshop Philipp

Photoshop Philipp, a stereotypical nerd, creates - accompanied by a song sung by Böhmermann - various print works using the image editing software Adobe Photoshop. The content parodies real works, for example from magazines.

- Böhmermann and the Jadebuben, Neo Magazin Royale Nerdchor:

Jan Böhmermann sings a piece of a well-known rapper, which is performed by a male choir.

- Der kleine Mann (the little man):

Hans Meiser (former German TV host) as a "little man" in the sharpener on Böhmermann's desk discusses current topics with him. In doing so, Meiser takes over unreflected and - except for a regular Stammtisch level - topical views of the media landscape. While Böhmermann tries to refute this with facts, Meiser does not deviate from his views and reacts with incomprehension to these replies. Often Meiser changes his statements and positions between the broadcasts. Meiser ends the conversation mostly with the words "poor Germany, poor Germany".

- Beef-träger (beef man):

Florentin Will (German comedian) as Beef man puts the current post in the studio to Böhmermann. These are not normal letters, but comments that are directed against Böhmermann (so-called beef). After a sample of the song "Please Mr. Postman" from The Marvelettes, an exaggerated dialogue between Will and Böhmermann follows, expressing his surprise. Böhmermann's question as to whether Beef is also there for him, affirms Will and then presents the beef, usually a letter or another medium, including its sender and a brief synopsis of the beef. Böhmermann answers this mostly with ink and pen.

- Viral oder egal (viral or no matter):

Florentin Will as a "click millionaire" lets guess the clicks of YouTube videos. Jan Böhmermann competes against the respective guest (s).

- Alarmstufe Print (alarm level print):

Böhmermann presents supposedly current developments in the magazine industry. This is a current issue of a magazine as a template, are shown by the fictitious imitators and usually discussed.

=== Parodies ===
- Williams Internetecke (William's internet corner):

William Cohn (sidekick of Böhmermann) presents the Internet in the style of the 1990s. Here he goes into Internet phenomena - such as the Nyan Cat or the Star Wars Kid - by re-enacting them himself. From a video of the Nyan Cat parody exists a 10-hour version, which is only 9 hours and 21 minutes long.

- Wahre Fakten mit Florentin Ulfkotte (true facts with Florentin Ulfkotte):

In the style of the mystery show Beyond Belief: Fact or Fiction, Florentin Will clarifies the audience about allegedly true facts and their contexts, which are based on conspiracy theories and half-truths. Most "true facts" are derived from the smallest evidence. The chains of evidence always end up with Michelle Obama. Will speaks English and synchronizes himself in a voice-over into German.

- Das digitale Quartett (the digital quartet):

Four older, upper-middle-class actors perform real discussions from the internet (such as YouTube comments) sitting in an antique castle room. It is pointed out in advance that the texts are both content and grammatical unchanged.

- heute- (today-):

William Cohn parodies the "heute +" program (German news program) in the style of the 1980s. The target audience of today are viewers over 40 years.

- Eier aus Stahl (balls of steel):

Böhmermann commented objectively, but with an ironic and sarcastic undertone, the work of a person with reference to a topical subject. Here, to the right of Böhmermann a steel wall with different representations is displayed. These representations show thematically fitting pictures of the named persons or facts, which complement or deliberately contradict Böhmermann's commentary. The Colbert Report with its segment "The Word" served as a role model here.

- Die Fernsehnothilfe (the TV emergency help):

According to the motto "We have the ideas, they have the quota", an attempt is made to introduce videos produced or altered by the team of the Neo Magazine Royale into other broadcasts so that they do not recognize the true source. After broadcasting the program, this section will be broadcast and the (partly fictitious) making-of the video will be shown and the Neo Magazine will be the author.

- @therealfuehrer

Parody of various YouTubers and their formats as well as the person of Adolf Hitler by Böhmermann. Böhmermann as stereotypical Hitler, called Adi, presents in the style of the parodied YouTubers or the parodied YouTubers with the vocabulary and the world view of the Third Reich various products or places that are also parodies. Hitler is staged as a stereotype YouTuber.

- William will's wissen (william wants to know it):

William Cohn wants to explore the television world far from the Neo magazine Royale and is a guest in various programs. Then Cohn takes over also short speech parts in the transmission.

- Böhmi brutzelt (Böhmi grills):

Böhmermann cooks together with the guest of the show in the style of classic cooking show.

- Rieß mal Neo (Rieß by Neo):

Larissa Rieß (German actress) conducts an exclusive interview with parodies of current politicians.

- Zini das Wuslon (Zini the wuslon):

The character comes from a children's program and is always announced by Böhmermann as an expert on political topics and accordingly seriously interviewed by him. The humor results from the crude answers Zinis, which Böhmermann extravagantly offended as fancy and reveal a strongly polemic right-wing radical background. Furthermore, Zini often mentions his extensive drug use.

- Dicke Titten - Das Gleichberechtigungsmagazin (Big Tits - the equal rights magazine):

Böhmermann discusses with women in a way that everyone has their say. It usually ends with insulting the other sex.

- Verbrannte Erde mit Florentin W. (Burned earth with Florentin W.):

Parody of investigative contributions from feature magazines with Florentin Will as a reporter. It will be exaggeratedly dramatized everyday operations behind the scenes of the show shown, with Will the theme exclusively criticizes the Neo magazine Royale sets out. The facts presented are often very absurd and the presented Actuaries of the show overbearing the reporter.

- Dr. Internett - Internetseelsorge mit William Domain (Dr. Internet - internet pastoral care with William Domain):

William Cohn reads questions from various Internet forums and answers these often sexually suggestive.

- Aktenzeichen http ungelöst (case number http unsolved):

Parody on Aktenzeichen XY ... ungelöst. William Cohn as "Capslock Holmes" presents possible crimes from the internet. The program is in the style of the 1980s (for example, with fax and dial telephone) held. In the end, Cohn always asks the audience for help, the possible case is resolved.

- Young Böhmermann:

Jan Böhmermann shows his childhood and his former school career. The format is based on Young Sheldon. Also today's colleagues of Böhmermann (for example: Larissa Rieß or Florentin Will) are portrayed in a childlike form. In addition, as in the US series, Böhmermann gives his thoughts and opinions about the past events.

- TKKabelka:

Böhmermann's sidekick Ralf Kabelka solve crime cases like the German children's radio play series TKKG. The adults all act like children and miss the simplest clues. In the end they solve the crime without paying attention to the consequences.

- Die ZDF-Tierkritik mit Dr. Margot Dokthor (the ZDF-animal criticism with Dr. Margot Dokthor):

Guila Decker as Margot Dokthor criticized different animals like rabbits or hamsters. It is assumed that the animals behave like humans because of this Guila count several non-existent skills which the animals don't have.

- Berlin BundesTAG & Nacht (Berlin BundesDAY & Night):

It's a parody to the German reality-soap opera "Berlin Tag & Nacht (Berlin Day & Night)". Its shows a fictitious commune of German politicians like Angela Merkel or Horst Seehofer . The episode are often current political news or topics.

=== Additional segments (only available on the internet) ===
These segments can only be accessed in the media library of ZDF and on YouTube (called "web exclusive") and are not part of the actual program. Often, individual segments and parodies, in addition to the broadcast, are published exclusively online.

- Die große Kommentare-Kommentier-Show (The big comments commentary show):

Böhmermann often reads hate-filled comments from various sources about the program or his person and makes a short statement. He is here in a living room backdrop in the style of the 1950s to 1970s. This section is strongly based on corresponding YouTube formats and is available on Tuesdays after the broadcast.

- FAQjan:

Viewers ask questions to Böhmermann under the hashtag of the same name, which answers them in some way (FAQ). This segment appears irregularly.

- Das Urteil (the judgment):

Böhmermann reads comments on the program and falls at the end of a verdict on the broadcast, including all components.

- Das Orakel von Selfie (the oracle of selfie):

Böhmermann makes conclusions from a submitted selfie on characteristics and character of the imaged person.

== Erdogan controversy ==
After a satirical poem about the Turkish president Recep Tayyip Erdoğan aired on 31 March 2016, a controversy arose in German media about the limits of satire. The ZDF channel deleted the poem from its internet archives in the ZDFmediathek. According to ZDF program director Norbert Himmler, Böhmermann had approved the deletion. ZDF director Thomas Bellut defended the program. "Of course I stand by the satire program, by the presenters and also by Mr. Böhmermann. I urge that a short portion of this longer satire episode not be given undue emphasis. Ultimately, it is a program which you can judge one way or the other." The filming of the 14 April edition of Neo Magazin Royale was cancelled due to "massive media reporting and the focus on the programme and the presenter". On 16 April Böhmermann himself announced he would be taking a four-week break from TV and radio work, which was confirmed by his broadcaster, ZDF.

The next edition of Neo Magazin Royale was filmed on 12 May. Böhmermann resumed the show with a reference to the affair, saying that he wanted to make no more jokes about Adolf Hitler, because he did not want to be sued by him. His guest in the episode was The Left politician Gregor Gysi, who said that he disliked the poem because "it serves every prejudice", but strongly criticized Erdogan for his policies against the Kurds and the press. Gysi also said that he would have defended Böhmermann as a lawyer.

== Every Second Counts ==
In early 2017, the similar Dutch satirical late-night talkshow Zondag met Lubach video "The Netherlands welcomes Trump in his own words" that ridiculed U.S. President Donald Trump, whilst also using self-mockery, went viral and was viewed more than 73 million times worldwide. It inspired Neo Magazin Royale to launch a Europe-wide video contest to let every country make its own parody video.
