= Erdowie, Erdowo, Erdogan =

2016 satirical song by extra 3

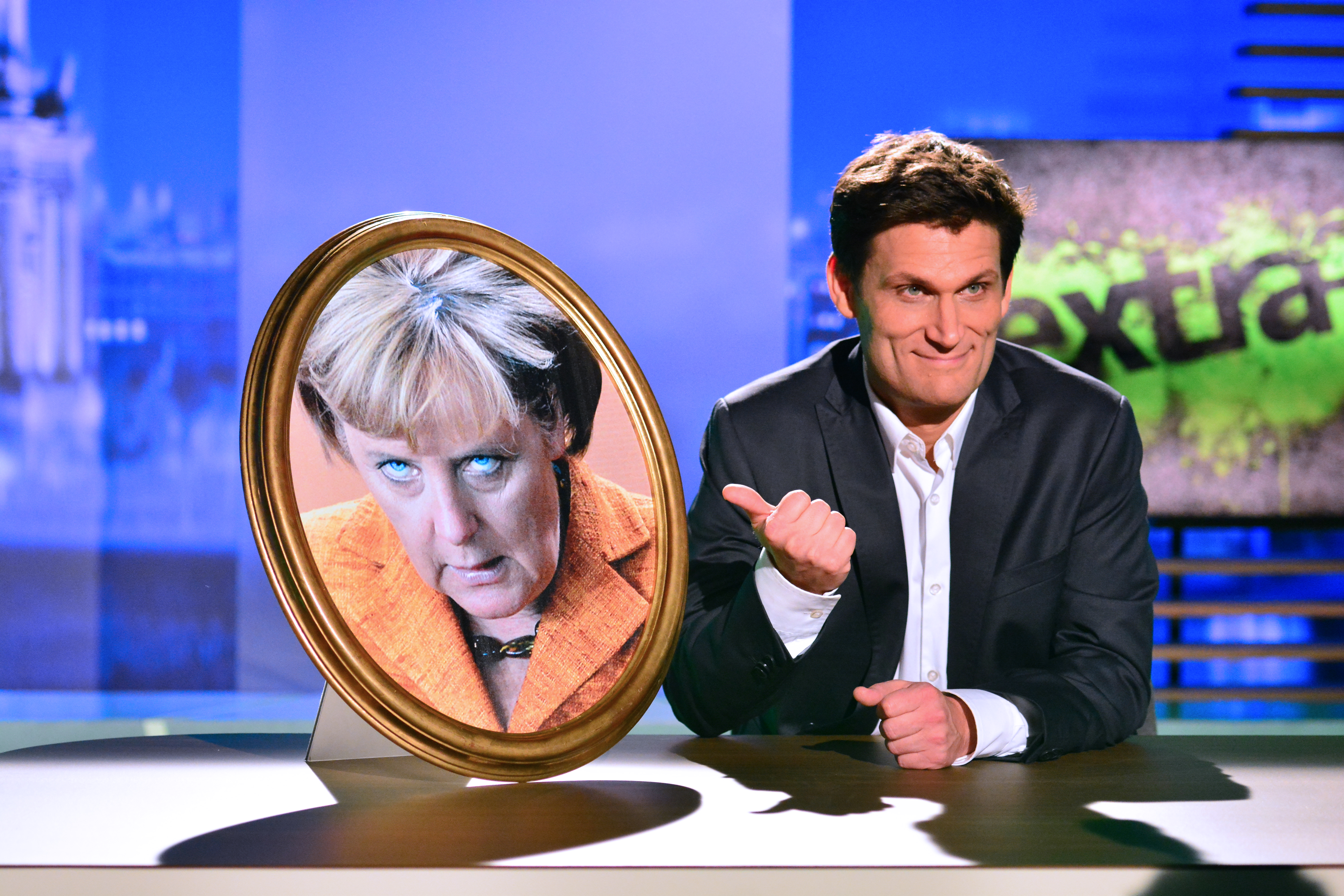
The music video was made by extra 3, a political satire TV show produced by Norddeutscher Rundfunk.

"Erdowie, Erdowo, Erdogan" (German for "Erdo-how, Erdo-where, Erdogan") is a satirical music video that was produced by German TV show extra 3 in March 2016. The song mocks Turkish president Recep Tayyip Erdoğan. Following the release of the song, Turkey summoned the German ambassador to Turkey and demanded that the song be taken down, a request the German government refused. The Turkish government's response to the video led directly to the Böhmermann affair, when a German comedian responded with a vulgar poem directed towards Erdoğan, precipitating a diplomatic dispute.

== Contents of the video ==
The roughly 2-minute-long video, set to the tune of "Irgendwie, irgendwo, irgendwann" by German band Nena, takes aim at Erdoğan over a variety of issues, including his government's treatment of refugees, his clamping down on press freedoms in Turkey (including the hostile takeover of the Zaman newspaper that month), his bombing of the Kurds in Syria, and his anti-democratic actions in Turkey. The video contains footage of police attacking protesters in Turkey with batons and water cannons, and police raids of newspaper offices, interspersed with footage of Erdoğan meeting with German Chancellor Angela Merkel and then-president of the European Commission Jean-Claude Juncker, as well as several humorous and digitally-altered scenes from Erdoğan's public life.

== Reactions to the video ==
On 22 March 2016, Turkish government officials summoned the German ambassador to the country, Martin Erdmann, and formally complained about the video, requesting it to be taken down. In an example of the Streisand effect, the Turkish government reaction to the video inflamed the situation, resulting in widespread media coverage of the video. By the 24th, the video had amassed over four million views, ten times extra 3's typical viewership. Following Turkey's attempt to take the video down, German satirist Jan Böhmermann responded by reading an explicit poem about Erdoğan on his TV show in late March, resulting in what became known as the Böhmermann affair.

The German public strongly opposed censorship of the video. A representative of left wing political party Die Linke said, "The foreign office finally has to take a clear stand to defend press freedom. Our fundamental rights cannot be sacrificed on the altar of the shabby EU-Turkey deal." Representatives of the Christian Democratic Union, which was part of the ruling coalition at the time, told Der Spiegel that the party opposed Erdogan's "hopeless arrogance" and attempts at "intimidation". Some commentators noted that the attempted censorship showcased the risks of working with an authoritarian leader. Klaus-Dieter Frankenberger, writing for the Frankfurter Allgemeine Zeitung, said that the fiasco "is an indication of a clear misunderstanding of Western press freedoms" on Erdoğan's part. Frank Überall, the chairman of the Deutscher Journalisten-Verband, stated that Erdoğan "apparently has lost his grip" and called his anger "laughable".

According to the editor of extra 3, the production team was not notified of the complaint by either the Turkish or German governments, having heard about it on social media. Responding to the controversy, the show added English captions to the video and promoted it on the channel's Twitter account. They also posted a political cartoon featuring a caricature of Erdoğan saying "Entweder ihr entfernt dieses Video oder ich lösche das Internet" ("Either you erase this video or I will extinguish the Internet") while holding a fire extinguisher.

For April Fools' Day in 2016, one week after the video made international headlines, EUobserver ran a satirical story falsely claiming that the video had been created by European Union member states and the United States as a means to attack Erdoğan, and that it had been personally approved by Merkel.

== Legacy ==
In 2017, extra 3 created a second song mocking Erdoğan, titled "Neuer Song für Erdogan" (New Song for Erdogan), this time set to the tune of Nena's song "99 Luftballons".
