= Ralf Höcker =

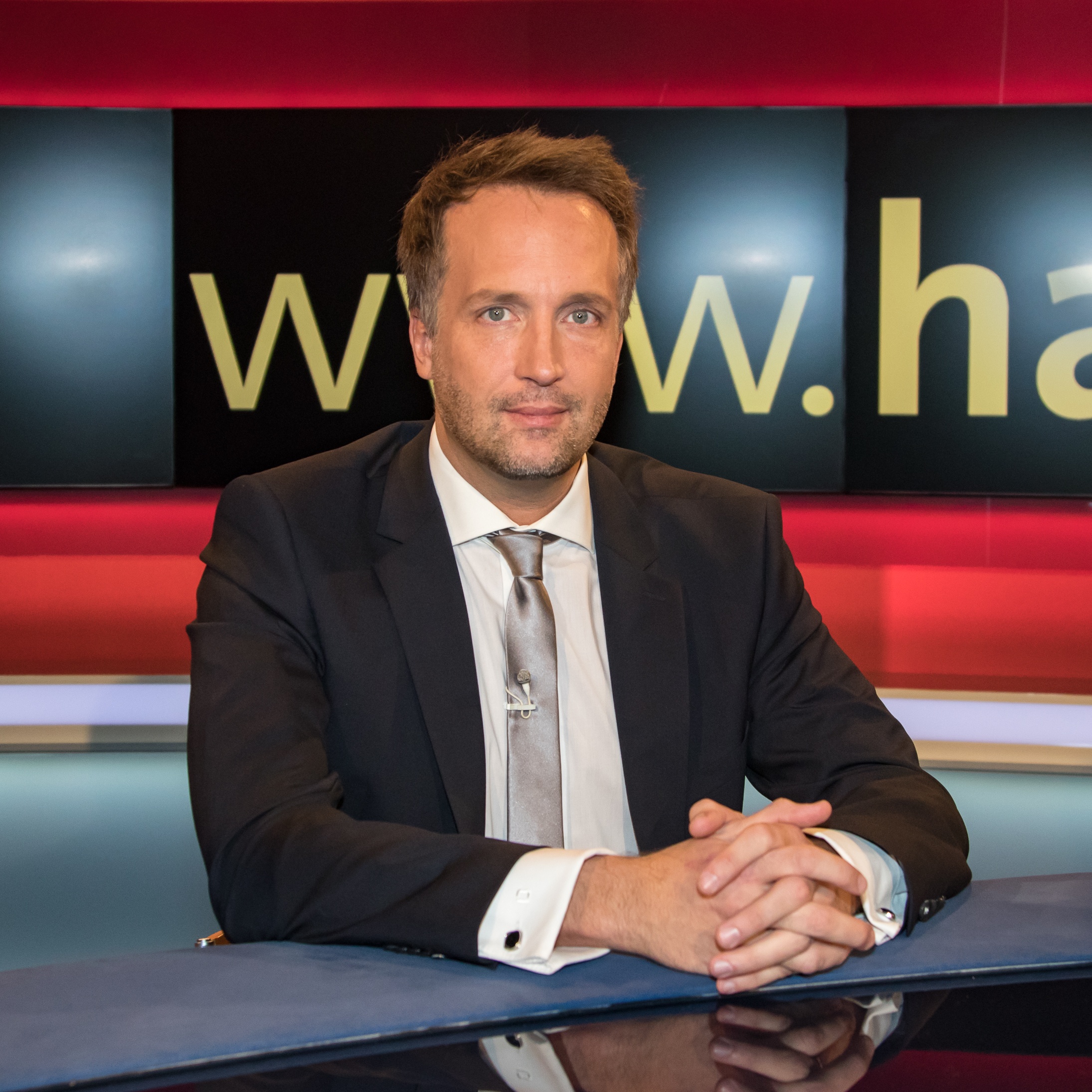
Höcker in 2016

Ralf Höcker (born March 4, 1971, in Cologne) is a German lawyer and author. He is involved in several factions within the CDU. In public perception, he is noted for numerous high-profile legal mandates related to the press and recurring media presence.

== Early life ==
Ralf Höcker studied jurisprudence at the University of Cologne, received a scholarship from the Konrad Adenauer Foundation, and completed his doctoral studies (Dr. jur.) in Cologne in 1999. Subsequently, he pursued a Master of Laws (LL.M.) in Intellectual Property Law at King's College London. In addition, from 1999 to 2000, he worked as a Foreign Lawyer at the London-based firm Willoughby & Partners / Rouse & Co., Int. From 2001 to 2003, he practiced as a lawyer at the business law firm Linklaters in Cologne (following the merger of Oppenhoff & Rädler with Linklaters, England) during that time.

In 2003, Höcker became self-employed as a lawyer and established his own law firm in Cologne, which has since operated under the name Höcker Rechtsanwälte. He specialized in Trademark and Media/Entertainment law.

Additionally, he is involved with the private Cologne Business School. Initially, from 2008 to 2009, he served as a lecturer for German and International Trademark and Media Law. Since 2009, Höcker has held a professorship in German and International Trademark and Media Law at the school, initially as a salaried professor from 2009 to 2014, and since 2014 as an honorary professor. Furthermore, since 2010, he has been the Scientific Director of the "Deutsches Institut für Kommunikation und Recht im Internet" (German Institute for Communication and Law on the Internet) at the same institution.

Höcker is a regular contributor to the journal "Der IP-Rechts-Berater" published by Dr. Otto Schmidt. Until 2015, he sporadically wrote the column "Fünfte Gewalt" for the debate forum Vocer. He is also the author of numerous books and articles on media law.

== Legal Mandates ==
=== Jörg Kachelmann ===
In the Kachelmann trial, he represented the weather presenter as his media lawyer and, in parallel with the work of defense attorney Johann Schwenn, conducted legal public relations for Jörg Kachelmann (Litigation public relations). On behalf of his client, Höcker sued the Axel Springer Group for more than half a million euros in damages and interest for their coverage of the Kachelmann trial.

=== Felix Magath ===
Football team manager Felix Magath was represented by Höcker as his media lawyer in the initially confrontational separation from FC Schalke 04 in the 2010-11 Bundesliga season.

=== Turkish Daily Newspaper ===
In 2013, Höcker filed a Verfassungsbeschwerde with the Federal Constitutional Court on behalf of the Turkish daily newspaper Sabah regarding the seating arrangements in the National Socialist Underground trial. The Federal Constitutional Court upheld the complaint and ordered that an additional contingent of seats be provided for foreign media representatives or that the accreditation process for journalists be repeated. As a result, the start of the trial at the Oberlandesgericht in Munich was postponed by almost three weeks to reorganize the accreditation.

=== Employee of Federal Constitutional Protection Bureau ===
On behalf of an employee of the Federal Office for the Protection of the Constitution, Höcker took legal action against the daily newspapers Die Welt and Junge Welt. These newspapers had reported on the possible involvement of the individual in the National Socialist Underground's 2001 bombing in Cologne. Höcker also issued a legal warning to a Twitter user who had shared a link to an article containing the name of Höcker's client.

=== Netzer v. Zwanziger ===
In connection with the scandal surrounding the alleged bought FIFA World Cup 2006 in Germany, in December 2015, Höcker filed a lawsuit on behalf of former Germany national football team member Günter Netzer against the former German Football Association President Theo Zwanziger. Zwanziger had claimed that Netzer had told him that the four Asian votes in the World Cup bidding process had been bought. This quote initially served as circumstantial evidence for the investigative journalism of the Spiegel, suggesting that a German Football Association payment of 6.7 million euros with an unclear purpose had been used to buy the 2006 FIFA World Cup. Netzer and Zwanziger reached a settlement in April 2016 and issued a joint statement (translated): "Günter Netzer emphasizes that there was no statement from him in the said conversation that could be interpreted as suggesting that the four Asian votes in the 2006 World Cup bidding were bought." Theo Zwanziger agreed not to repeat his statement.

=== Erdoğan v. Döpfner ===
In May 2016, on behalf of the President of Turkey, Recep Tayyip Erdoğan, Höcker filed a request for an injunction against the CEO of Axel Springer SE, Mathias Döpfner, at the Regional Court in Cologne. Döpfner had publicly expressed solidarity with Böhmermann during the Böhmermann affair. The request was rejected in the first instance. Höcker, speaking to the media, likened the treatment of Erdoğan to a "mass rape" that leads to a loss of inhibitions, with everyone eventually participating. Höcker represents Erdoğan in all defamation lawsuits related to the Böhmermann poem in Germany, except in the case against Böhmermann personally.

=== Archdiocese of Cologne ===
As part of the public discussion and investigation into allegations of sexual abuse in the Archdiocese of Cologne, and the preparation of a new report, the law firm Höcker was commissioned in the fall of 2019 to examine press-related aspects.

=== Pope Benedict XVI. ===
As part of the team assembled by Pope Benedict XVI. of canon law and legal advisors in the context of the Munich abuse report, Höcker and colleagues were involved in reviewing the report and drafting the results.

=== Dutch Royal Couple v. Axel Springer ===
On September 24, 2020, Höcker obtained an interim injunction for Willem-Alexander of the Netherlands and Queen Máxima of the Netherlands against Axel Springer SE. The Cologne Regional Court prohibited the publication of photos depicting them in swimwear during a yacht vacation in Greece, deeming it not a "contemporary historical event."

=== AfD v. BfV ===
==== Possible Conflict of Interest ====
The law firm Höcker, whose member was Hans-Georg Maaßen from October 1, 2019, to January 25, 2021, represented the AfD in a case against the Federal Office for the Protection of the Constitution (BfV). The lawsuit aims to limit or prevent the surveillance of the AfD by the BfV. The party is challenging surveillance by the domestic intelligence agency even before it was publicly disclosed. The authority remains silent on the matter as the case is still ongoing. On January 25, 2021, Die Zeit pointed out that Maaßen was working for Höcker, and after the article's publication, Maaßen terminated his collaboration with the law firm.

With a letter dated January 26, 2021, a lawyer filed a complaint against Maaßen for a possible violation of the professional prohibition of representing conflicting interests. The complaint was dismissed by the Düsseldorf Bar Association in a decision in June 2021.

==== Substantive law ====
At the federal level, the AfD as a whole party is not a subject of observation by the Federal Office for the Protection of the Constitution (BfV). In a press conference on January 15, 2019, the BfV initially referred to the party as a "Prüffall" (review case). However, one month later, the Administrative court in Cologne, through a decision on February 26, 2019, prohibited the authority from continuing to publicly characterize the party in this way, stating that there was no legal basis for it. The designation had a "negative effect" in the public, and the BfV had unlawfully and disproportionately intervened in the AfD's party rights and personality rights.

The authority had previously removed a corresponding press release from its website and, after announcing the decision, stated that it did not intend to contest it. The decision is now legally binding. In January, the BfV had also instructed its employees to disclose internal contacts with the AfD to prevent potential conflicts of loyalty in the examination of the observation question. The AfD also filed a lawsuit against this measure before the Administrative Court in Cologne, alleging that it violated the principle of equality before the law and the state's duty of neutrality.

The Administrative Court in Cologne rejected a request from the AfD, in which the party sought an interim solution in the dispute over the classification as a right-wing extremist suspicion case by the Federal Office for the Protection of the Constitution. In another decision, the Administrative Court in Cologne also declined to issue an interim regulation prohibiting the Federal Office for the Protection of the Constitution from disclosing the current membership number of the dissolved right-wing extremist "Der Flügel." Both decisions were affirmed by the Higher Administrative Court for the state of North Rhine-Westphalia. Verfassungsbeschwerden filed against these decisions were dismissed by the Federal Constitutional Court. The Administrative Court in Cologne will hear this case starting from March 8, 2022, with particular significance placed on the statement of Jörg Meuthen for the outcome of the legal case.

=== Hans-Josef B. ===
Höcker legally represented the Cologne district council member Hans-Josef B. (CDU) in a media case. B. had shot and seriously injured a young adult during a verbal dispute at his garden fence. Höcker ensured that the name of the politician was not initially disclosed in the early media reports. He also obtained the removal of a tweet by the then CDU Secretary-General Paul Ziemiak that mentioned the full name. The party colleague, who served in the district council of Porz, later suspended all his positions in the CDU. In February 2022, he was convicted by the Cologne Regional Court of grievous bodily harm, insult, and a violation of gun control laws in Germany, receiving a prison sentence of three years and six months. He appealed the decision, but the 2nd Federal Court of Justice dismissed it in December 2022, making the Regional Court's judgment final.

== Positions ==
In early May 2019, Höcker spoke on the topic "Lawyers against Journalists: Threat to Press Freedom?" (translated) at re:publica’19, the self-proclaimed largest conference in Europe for digital society, bringing together activists, bloggers, creatives, and artists. On May 11, 2019, he delivered a lecture at the "1st Conference of Free Media" organized by the AfD faction in the German Bundestag, advocating for journalistic ethics and against fake news. He emphasized that he would present this lecture "even in front of the Antifa."

Höcker has been a member of the Christian Democratic Union of Germany and the Values Union since 2019. On June 15, 2019, Höcker was elected as the honorary spokesperson for the Values Union. On September 26, 2019, he was elected as the new chairman of the CDU local association Cologne Innenstadt-Süd. From October 1, 2019, to January 25, 2021, Hans-Georg Maaßen, a member of the Values Union and former president of the Federal Office for the Protection of the Constitution, worked as Of counsel for the Managing Board of Höcker's media law firm. As the spokesperson for the Values Union, he stated that "public broadcasting should be abolished in its current form."

On February 13, 2020, Höcker announced on Facebook his "withdrawal from all political organizations" and attributed it to a threat he received on the same day.

In the selection of mandates, Höcker describes his law firm as "pain-free" and emphasizes the legal professional ethics, but makes it clear that "as lawyers, we do not align ourselves with the worldviews or actions of our clients." At the same time, Höcker emphasizes that the law firm, considering the German party landscape, would provide legal advice to politicians from all parties represented in the Bundestag. An internal assessment of the number of party mandates at the law firm revealed that the majority of mandates were for the SPD and CDU, followed by representation for other parties.

== Criticism ==
Höcker is criticized for his political views and his "robust" exercise of mandates against journalists. Regarding his approach to unlawful journalistic reporting, Höcker commented: "Before an article is published, I try to understand how the report will look and what could be unlawful in it. And then I try to prevent that from happening."

According to a report by Welt am Sonntag published in June 2015, Höcker was, among other things, the chairman of the supervisory board of Internetone AG, which is said to be involved in the operation of dating portals that are regularly criticized by consumer protection centers. Höcker denied the findings made against him in this context. He claimed that, as a supervisory board member, he was not involved in the operational activities of Internetone. Nevertheless, he resigned from his position on the supervisory board. Höcker's law firm represented Medusa United Media GmbH, operator of the then heavily criticized dating portal Flirtcafe.de, at least since 2009. The report by Welt am Sonntag also links this portal to the Internetone AG network. Following the coverage of Höcker's involvement in the operation of dating portals, the legal online magazine Legal Tribune Online was sent a cease and desist letter by a lawyer from the firm on behalf of the portal operator Ideo Labs GmbH. However, Legal Tribune Online contested this cease and desist letter.

In March 2017, it was revealed that Höcker also attempted to prevent Stiftung Warentest from naming two Autark companies due to their highly risky investment offers. "Ralf Höcker sees it as his job to influence journalists by threatening them," writes Stiftung Warentest. In response, Höcker referred to the consumer organization's reaction as "black PR" and countered this statement in an interview: "They conducted an unlawful financial test, and we took action against it, and successfully so."

== Media ==
=== Books ===
Höcker became known for three lexicons in which he clarifies popular legal misconceptions. In another book, he recounts peculiar cases that were tried in German courts. In the Langenscheidt dictionary Lawyer–German/German–Lawyer (translated), he critically and humorously examines the language of lawyers. The book titles are:

- Das Grundrecht der Gewissensfreiheit und seine Auswirkungen im Strafrecht. (The fundamental right to freedom of conscience and its impact on criminal law.) Lang, Frankfurt am Main 2000, ISBN 3-631-35533-5 (= Dissertation, Universität Köln, 1999).
- Lexikon der Rechtsirrtümer., mit Carsten Brennecke (Lexicon of Legal Misconceptions, with Carsten Brennecke), Ullstein, Berlin 2004, ISBN 3-548-36659-7.
- Neues Lexikon der Rechtsirrtümer. (New Lexicon of Legal Misconceptions) Ullstein, Berlin 2005, ISBN 3-548-36772-0.
- Lexikon der kuriosen Rechtsfälle. (Lexicon of Peculiar Legal Cases, with Carsten Brennecke), mit Carsten Brennecke, Ullstein, Berlin 2007, ISBN 3-548-36929-4.
- Das dritte Lexikon der Rechtsirrtümer. (The Third Lexicon of Legal Misconceptions) Ullstein, Berlin 2008, ISBN 978-3-548-36992-1.
- Anwalt–Deutsch/Deutsch–Anwalt. (Lawyer–German/German–Lawyer) Langenscheidt, München/Berlin 2009, ISBN 978-3-468-73212-6.
- Lexikon der Internetfallen. (Lexicon of Internet Traps) Ullstein, Berlin 2010, ISBN 978-3-548-37322-5.
- Ein§pruch! Das große Buch der Rechtsirrtümer. (Objection! The Big Book of Legal Misconceptions.) Ullstein, Berlin 2010, ISBN 978-3-548-37346-1.

=== Television and Stage ===
In 2006, Ralf Höcker appeared as a lawyer in the scripted reality court show "Richterin Barbara Salesch" on Sat.1. In 2007, he served as an expert in a series on "Akte – Reporter decken auf," where he clarified legal misconceptions. In the same year, he presented his stage show "Ein§pruch" on a Germany tour. In June 2009, Höcker co-hosted a television pilot of the RTL show "Einspruch – Die Show der Rechtsirrtümer" with Andrea Kiewel, which was continued in July 2010. Another season was aired in February 2011.

== Interviews ==
- Moritz Küpper, "Der Medienanwalt Ralf Höcker – Rechtssuche, wo rechts ist," Deutschlandfunk, September 14, 2017, retrieved on July 25, 2022.
- Benedict Neff, "Ich schicke keine Killerkommandos in die Redaktionen, keine Sorge," Neue Zürcher Zeitung, October 2, 2019, retrieved on February 26, 2021
