= Böhmermann affair =

2016 political dispute between Germany and Turkey

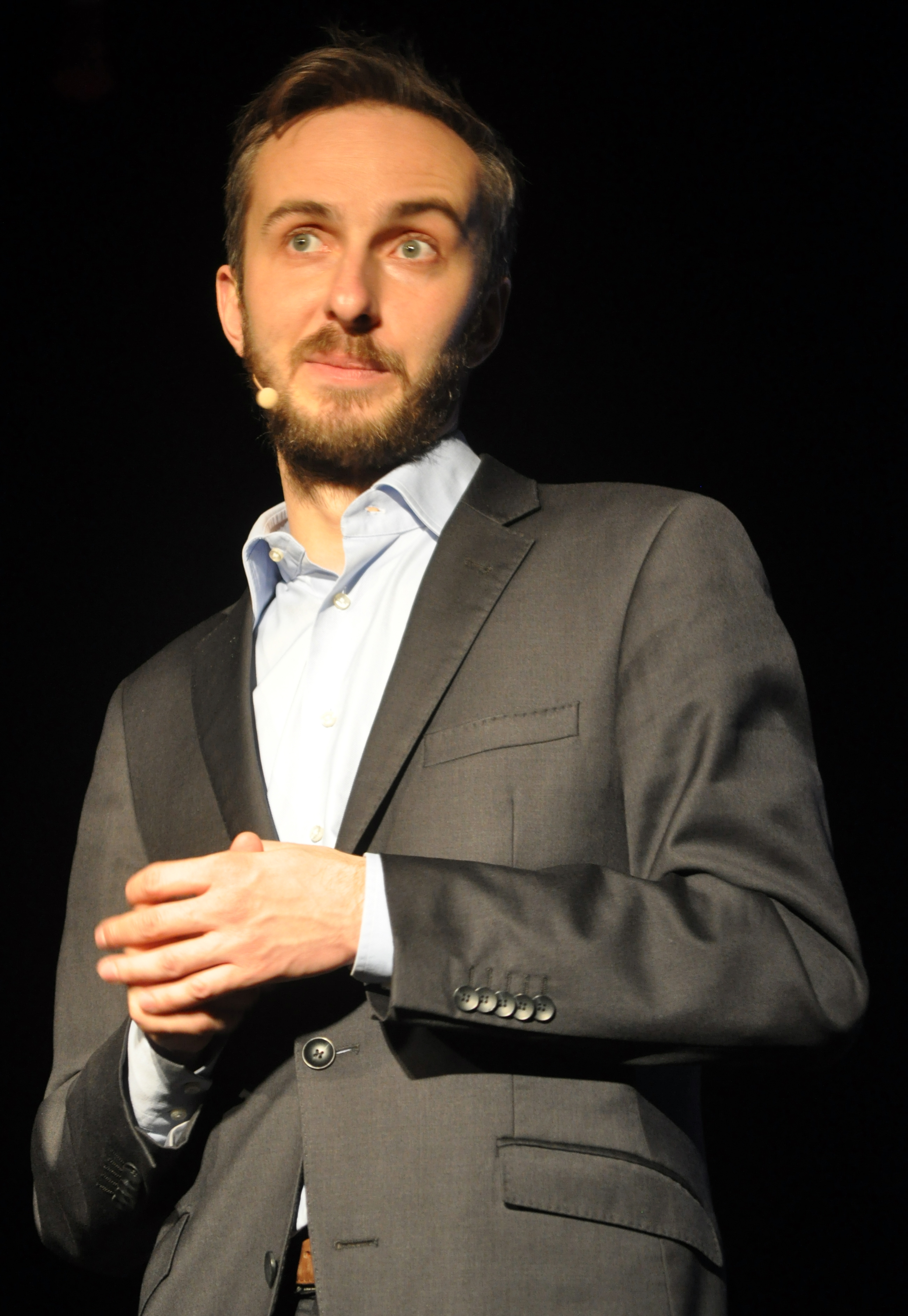
Jan Böhmermann (2014)

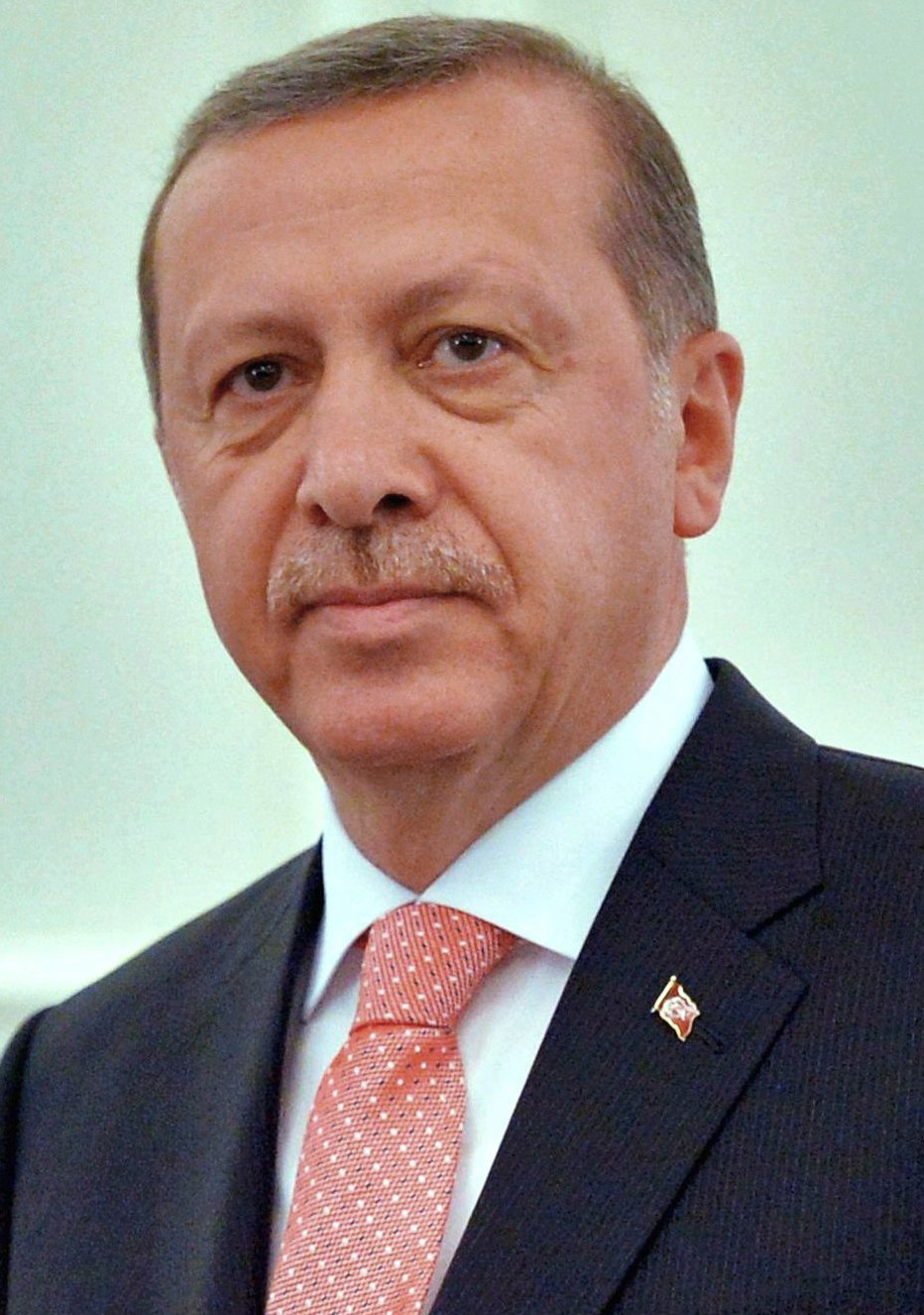
Recep Tayyip Erdoğan (2015)

The Böhmermann affair (also known as Erdogate) was a political affair following an experimental poem on German satirist Jan Böhmermann's satire show Neo Magazin Royale in late March 2016 that deliberately insulted Turkish president Recep Tayyip Erdoğan using profane language.

Days after a music video titled "Erdowie, Erdowo, Erdoğan" in another German satire show had infuriated Erdoğan, prompting Ankara to summon the German ambassador, Böhmermann went on to find the line between satire, which is protected by freedom of speech legislation, and "abusive criticism" (German: Schmähkritik) of a foreign state leader (lèse-majesté), which was still a punishable offense in Germany at that time. Explicitly acknowledging this experiment to be deliberately offensive and "forbidden", Böhmermann went on to present a poem that not only harshly criticized Erdoğan for his human rights record, but was also liberally seasoned with profanity.

After the show was aired on German public television channel ZDFneo, the Turkish government released a verbal note demanding that the German government begin criminal prosecution of Böhmermann. German Chancellor Angela Merkel further escalated the situation by apologizing for Böhmermann's "intentionally hurtful" poem – later she called this "a mistake". On 15 April Merkel announced in a press conference that the German government had approved Böhmermann's criminal prosecution, but would abolish the respective paragraph 103 of the German penal code before 2018. Intense criticism followed the Chancellor's decision, with speculation that she decided to allow the prosecution in order to protect Germany's refugee deal with Turkey. The case was dropped in October 2016. Paragraph 103 of the penal code was removed from the book in June 2017.

== Background ==
Earlier in March, the satirical music video Erdowie, Erdowo, Erdoğan by German satire show extra 3 had infuriated Turkish President Erdoğan, prompting Ankara to summon the German ambassador.

== Schmähkritik ==
In his show, Böhmermann announced he would try to illustrate what is the line between legitimate criticism such as the extra 3 video, which is protected by freedom of speech legislation, and "abusive criticism" (German: Schmähkritik) of a foreign state leader, which at that time in Germany was a punishable offense. Openly acknowledging that his experiment would be deliberately offensive, and standing in front of a Turkish flag and a portrait of Erdoğan, Böhmermann presented an experimental poem that not only harshly criticized Erdoğan for his human rights record, but also contained profanity.

Böhmermann, among other things, called Erdoğan "a man beating girls", and said that he is keen on "fucking goats" and he would "suppress minorities, kick the Kurds, hit Christians while watching child pornography." Much of the rest of the poem is devoted to associating Erdoğan with various less accepted forms of sexuality. Böhmermann deliberately played with the limits of satire and said several times that this form of abusive criticism was not allowed in Germany.

This edition of Böhmermann's show Neo Magazin Royale was aired on 31 March 2016 on public television channel ZDF neo.

== Reactions to the show ==
=== Public broadcaster ZDF ===
The ZDF channel distanced itself from the poem and deleted it from the program which can be seen in its internet archives "Mediathek". A few days later, ZDF director Thomas Bellut announced the support for Neo Magazin Royale and the presenter. On 16 April, the channel assured the "full legal protection" for Böhmermann throughout the judicial procedures.

=== Turkish government ===
The Turkish government released a verbal note in which it demanded the criminal prosecution of Böhmermann. According to German law as it applied at the time, the German government had to approve the demand for criminal prosecution by the foreign government before criminal proceedings could be started because of §103/104 StGB. In addition, Erdoğan himself made a complaint against Böhmermann as a private person because of the alleged insults. The Deputy Prime Minister of Turkey, Numan Kurtulmuş, called the poem a "serious crime against humanity".

=== Legal complaints ===
Twenty people lodged complaints because of the poem. The proceedings launched by the prosecutor's office for "insulting of organs and representatives of foreign states" were based on principle §103 and §104 in the German penal code. Paragraph 103 was abolished in 2016.

== Reactions to the Turkish government's complaint ==
=== German government ===
After a phone call with the Turkish Prime Minister, Ahmet Davutoğlu, Chancellor Angela Merkel criticised the poem as "intentionally hurtful" ("bewusst verletzend"), and prosecutors in Mainz planned to consult the federal Justice Ministry on whether to launch criminal proceedings.

On 15 April, Merkel announced in a press conference that the German government had approved a criminal prosecution of Böhmermann, though confirming reports of disagreement between a number of her coalition government's ministries and her office. Merkel said it was "not the business of the government" to make a decision in this case, but of the judiciary. However, considering the particular paragraph of the German criminal code "unnecessary", she announced legal steps would be taken towards scrapping it by 2018. Thomas Oppermann, leader of coalition partner SPD's Bundestag faction, criticised the decision: "I think this decision is wrong", he said. In the past days, there had been dissent with regard to the repeal between the SPD-led Foreign Office and the Bundeskanzleramt. It was also reported that Merkel herself had changed her mind several times.

All SPD ministers voted against the decision in the federal government. Nevertheless, Merkel's vote for the prosecution of Böhmermann was decisive. Opposition parties in the Bundestag, Alliance 90/The Greens and Die Linke, as well as the FDP sharply criticised the decision. On 22 April Merkel herself called her criticism of the poem a "mistake" about which she was "annoyed", while defending the decision to allow criminal proceedings against Böhmermann.

=== Parliament ===
During a Bundestag debate on 12 May 2016, the CDU MP Detlef Seif read the whole poem to demonstrate that it is an insult of the Turkish president, causing the outrage of several other MPs. "Put yourself in Erdoğan's position and think about how you would feel", Seif added in support of Angela Merkel. Böhmermann reacted with a Twitter post demanding the lifting of immunity of Seif.

=== Media ===
On 10 April the CEO of publishing house Axel Springer SE, Mathias Döpfner, made a plea for "solidarity with Jan Böhmermann". He compared Böhmermann's poem to the works of Martin Kippenberger. He also referred to Michel Houellebecq's Submission and accused the German government of kowtowing to Turkey. On 9 May it was reported by Deutsche Presseagentur that Erdoğan had also sued Döpfner, but a preliminary injunction was not granted. In addition, Erdoğan had applied for a preliminary injunction against film director Uwe Boll, which was granted and prevents Boll from calling Erdoğan a "moronic little wimp". Höcker compared the criticism of Erdoğan with a "mass rape".

The Washington Post editorial board criticized the German government's reaction in a featured commentary titled "Will Ms. Merkel defend free expression?" The editors held both the "anachronistic law" and the "morally dubious" refugee deal with Turkey accountable for what they considered Merkel's countenancing of "Erdoğan's bullying inside Germany". They feared that Merkel's "waffling" would encourage regimes around the world trying to suppress free speech both outside their borders and within.

Douglas Murray of The Spectator ran a competition for offensive poems about Erdoğan, promising £1,000 as first prize. The winner was Boris Johnson, Conservative MP, former Mayor of London, and later Prime Minister of the United Kingdom, who is one-eighth Turkish.

=== Public ===
Former Greek finance minister Yanis Varoufakis wrote on Twitter: "Europe first lost its soul (agreement with Turkey on refugees), now it is losing its humour. Hands off @janboehm!" In a satirical letter to president Erdoğan, the mayor of Tübingen, Boris Palmer (Alliance 90/The Greens), assured the president of his "solidarity" and demanded the extradition of Böhmermann to Turkey. "Cut off Böhmermann's testicles, so he never makes fun of presidents with a short dick again", he wrote. The letter is signed "most respectfully, Boris Palmer".

A YouGov poll revealed on 12 April, that a majority of the Germans supported Böhmermann's position. 48 percent of the pollees found the poem appropriate, 29 percent view it as undue. A great majority (66 percent) opposed the deletion of the poem on the ZDF website as well as Merkel's criticism of the poem as "intentionally hurtful" (68 percent). Only 15 percent supported a criminal investigation, while 77 percent objected to it. In the meantime, more than 240,000 people signed a petition for Böhmermann at Change.org. A further poll by Infratest dimap for the German ARD broadcaster published on 17 April showed that 65 percent of the Germans considered Merkel's decision to allow criminal proceedings against Böhmermann as "wrong", 28 percent supported it. Also, Merkel's personal popularity fell, 45 percent were satisfied with her work, while 56 percent were dissatisfied, an all-time low for her in this legislative period.

In an open letter several artists and actors expressed solidarity with Böhmermann on 13 April. Among them were the actors Matthias Brandt, Katja Riemann, Jan Josef Liefers, Peter Lohmeyer, the TV presenter Klaas Heufer-Umlauf, writer Thea Dorn and pianist Igor Levit. "Discussions about and criticism of Jan Böhmermann's Erdoğan poem belong in the newspaper arts sections of the country and not in a courtroom in Mainz", they wrote.

On 22 April 2016, Bruno Kramm, leader of Berlin's branch of the German Pirate Party, was arrested by the German police for reading the poem written by Jan Böhmermann in front of the Turkish embassy.

== International legislative reactions ==
A 20 April 2016 Dagbladet editorial said that "People in Norway have been appalled that the German chancellor Angela Merkel has brought to life a dormant law to help Turkey's president (...) Therefore we support the initiative from SV-politicians Audun Lysbakken, Bård Vegar Solhjell and Heikki Holmås to remove a similar dormant law from the Norwegian penal code. Next week in parliament the SV-trio will propose a change in the penal code's paragraph 184a".

The Netherlands announced to abolish the punishment for "insulting of foreign heads of state" as a reaction to the affair.

== Satire of the satire ==
In 2016 NRK's website uploaded a video by NRK Satiriks; the video was linked from the website's home page, by the title of the video, "Erdogan admits to following a goat home: – But nothing happened".

== Police protection ==
On 12 April it was reported that Böhmermann is under police protection, because he was threatened by supporters of Erdoğan. The filming of upcoming editions of Neo Magazin Royale was suspended until May 2016 due to "massive media reporting and the focus on the programme and the presenter". Böhmermann had also temporarily suspended his radio show Sanft & Sorgfältig on Sundays and was not present at the Grimme-Preis (Grimme Awards), where he was awarded for his Varoufakis video.

== Böhmermann's reaction ==
On 8 April Böhmermann asked Peter Altmaier, Federal Minister of the German Chancellery, for succor. "I would like to live in a country where the exploration of the limits of satire is allowed, desired and the subject of a civil society debate", he wrote on Twitter. He would not ask for help, but wished to plead for "considering my artistic approach and my position, even if it is contentious", Böhmermann added. Altmaier replied that he would answer when he was back in Berlin, but did not subsequently respond. Furthermore, Böhmermann engaged the well-known media lawyer Christian Schertz, who criticized Merkel and the German federal government among others for not respecting the separation of powers in Germany. Böhmermann himself on 16 April announced a 4-week pause of his TV and radio activities, which was confirmed by his channel ZDF. The filming of the next edition of Neo Magazin Royale was delayed until 12 May.

In an interview with Die Zeit on 3 May, Böhmermann sharply criticized Angela Merkel. "The chancellor must not waver when it comes to freedom and human rights", he said. "But instead she filleted me, served me to a neurotic despot for tea and made me become a German Ai Weiwei." His "belief" was shaken, "that every person in Germany has a non-negotiable, inalienable right to exercise certain basic rights: the freedom of art and the freedom of expression." Merkel did "obviously not think for a moment" about the poem, which he said was only an illustration of an insult: "It was much too dumb for me to insult Erdogan. I think, anyone can see this from the stupid smear poem." Böhmermann claimed that he had not even written it himself.

== See also ==
- Michael Dickinson (artist)
- Germany–Turkey relations
- Media freedom in Turkey
