= Olli Schulz =

German singer-songwriter, actor and presenter

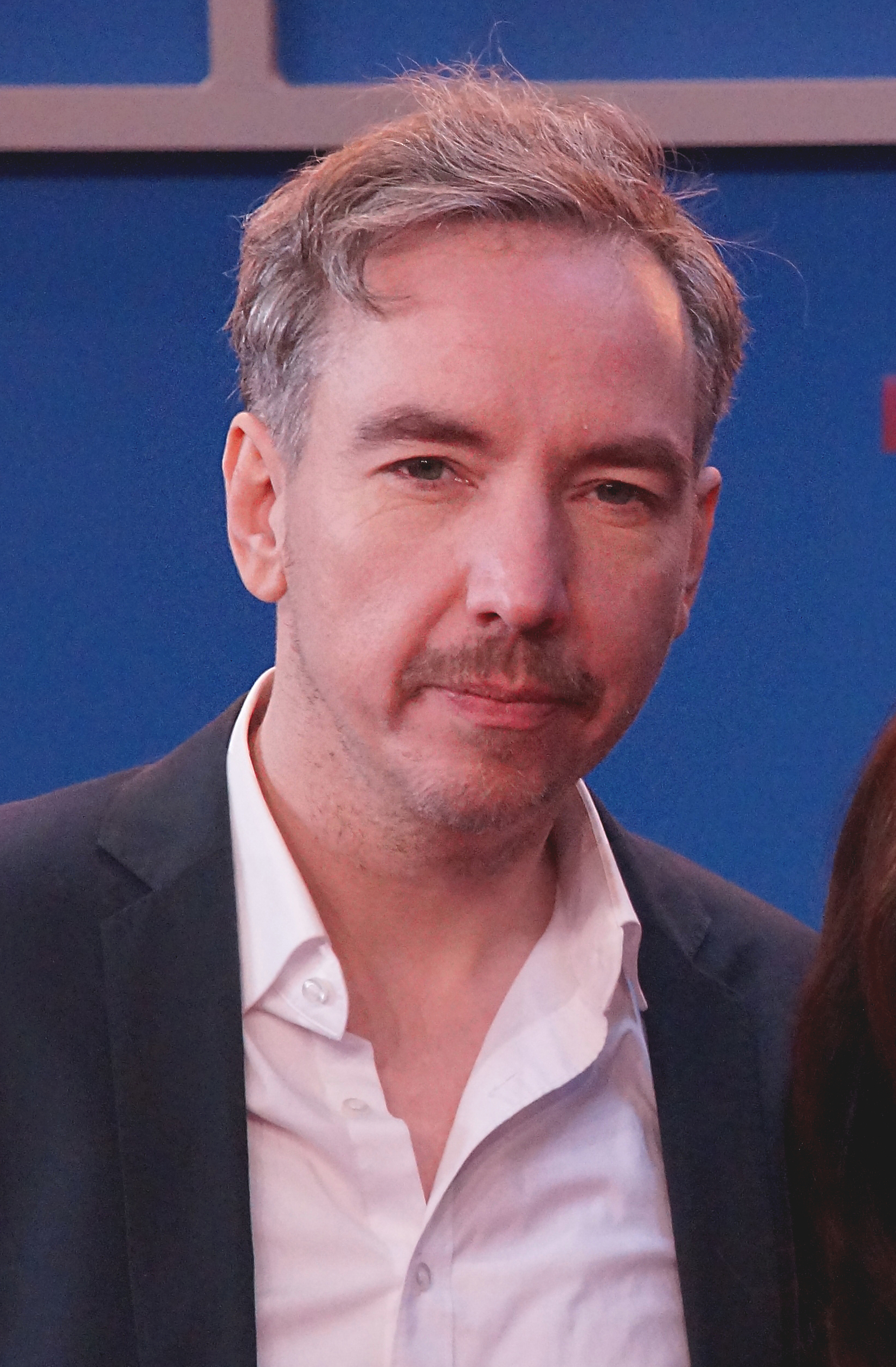
- Schulz in 2016
- Born: Oliver Marc Schulz; 15 October 1973 (age 53); Hamburg, West Germany
- Occupations: Singer-songwriter, actor, presenter
- Website: ollischulz.com

Oliver Marc "Olli" Schulz (born 15 October 1973) is a German singer-songwriter, actor and presenter. He became known as a singer and guitarist of the indie rock group Olli Schulz & der Hund Marie and as a sidekick of Joko Winterscheidt and Klaas Heufer-Umlauf in their various TV series, like Circus HalliGalli.

In 2016, Schulz started the TV show Schulz & Böhmermann along with fellow presenter Jan Böhmermann, with whom he also presents the semi-weekly podcast show Fest & Flauschig (Firm & Fluffy) on Spotify. He is also active as a solo musician; his 2015 album, Feelings aus der Asche, peaked at No. 4 in the German album charts, and his 2024 album Vom Rand der Zeit reached No. 1.

== Works ==
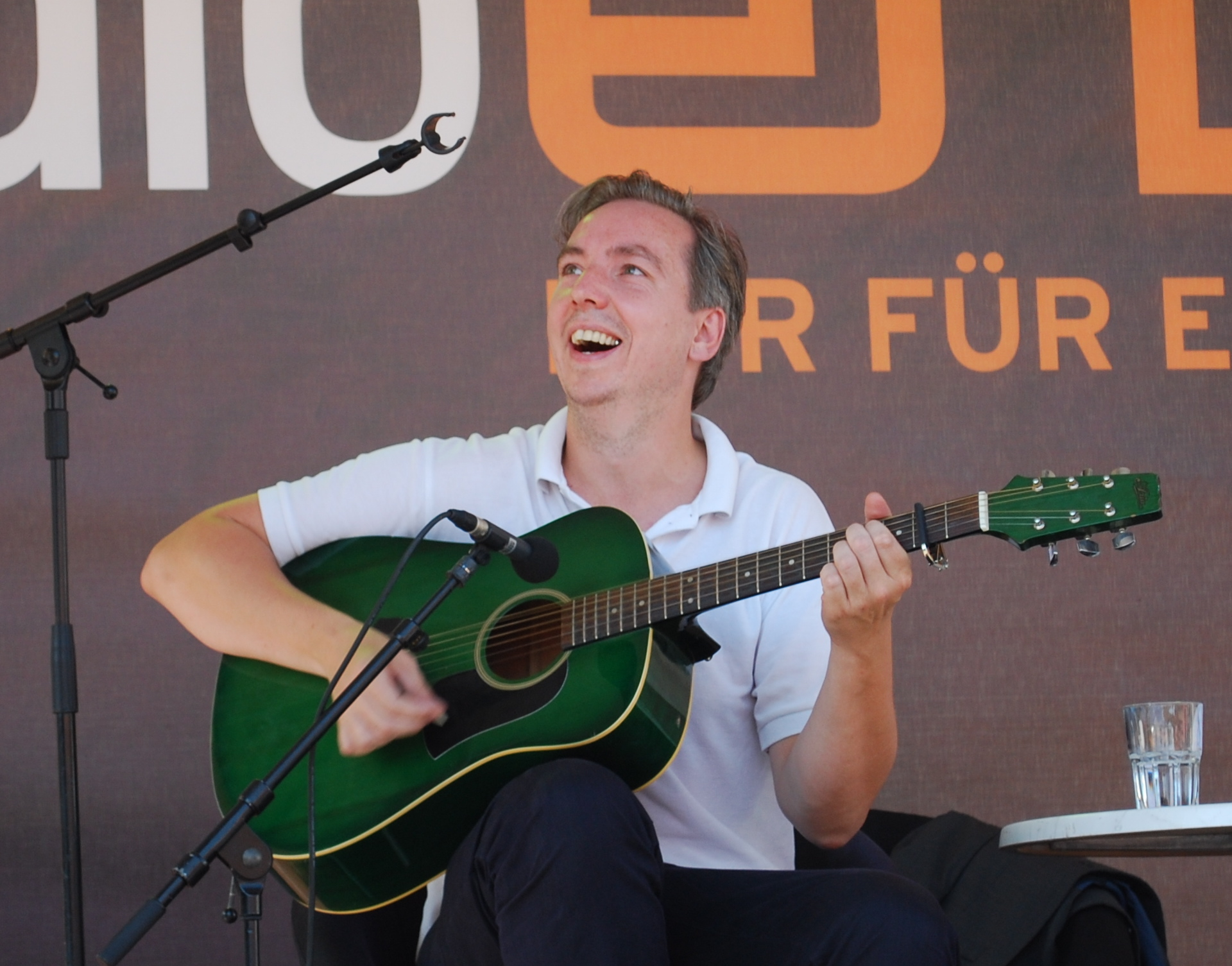
Schulz in 2012

=== TV shows ===
- 2009: Bei Olli, NDR Fernsehen
- 2011–2013: neoParadise, ZDFneo
- 2013: Circus HalliGalli, ProSieben
- 2013–2015: Schulz in the Box, ProSieben
- 2014: Joko gegen Klaas – Die härtesten Duelle um die Welt, ProSieben
- since 2016: Schulz & Böhmermann, ZDFneo

=== Radio ===
- 2005–2009: Ein Schulz – ein Song (column on Radio Fritz/RBB)
- 2009: YOU FM Nightline (You FM/hr) along with Patricia Pantel
- 2011: Olli Schulz on Tour (Radio Eins/RBB)
- 2011–2013: 16 und Zwei (Radio Eins) along with Joko Winterscheidt
- 2012: Joko und Klaas mit Olli und Jan (Radio Eins) along with Jan Böhmermann
- 2012–2016: Sanft & Sorgfältig (Radio Eins, N-Joy/NDR, Bremen Vier, Puls/BR, You FM, Dasding/SWR) along with Jan Böhmermann

=== Podcast ===
- since 2016: Fest & Flauschig (Spotify) along with Jan Böhmermann

=== Films ===
- 2014: Bibi & Tina: Bewildered and Bewitched
- 2017: Sharknado 5

=== TV series ===
- 2016: Crime Scene Cleaner (Der Tatortreiniger), NDR (episode Freunde)
- 2018: Crime Scene Cleaner (Der Tatortreiniger), NDR (episode Rebellen)
- 2019: How to Sell Drugs Online (Fast), Netflix (episode Score Big or Don't Score at All)

=== Albums ===
- 2009: Es brennt so schön (It Burns So Beautiful)
- 2012: SOS – Save Olli Schulz
- 2015: Feelings aus der Asche (Feelings from the Ashes)
- 2018: Scheiß Leben, gut erzählt (Goddamn Life, well told)
- 2024: Vom rand der zeit (From the edge of time)

=== Singles ===
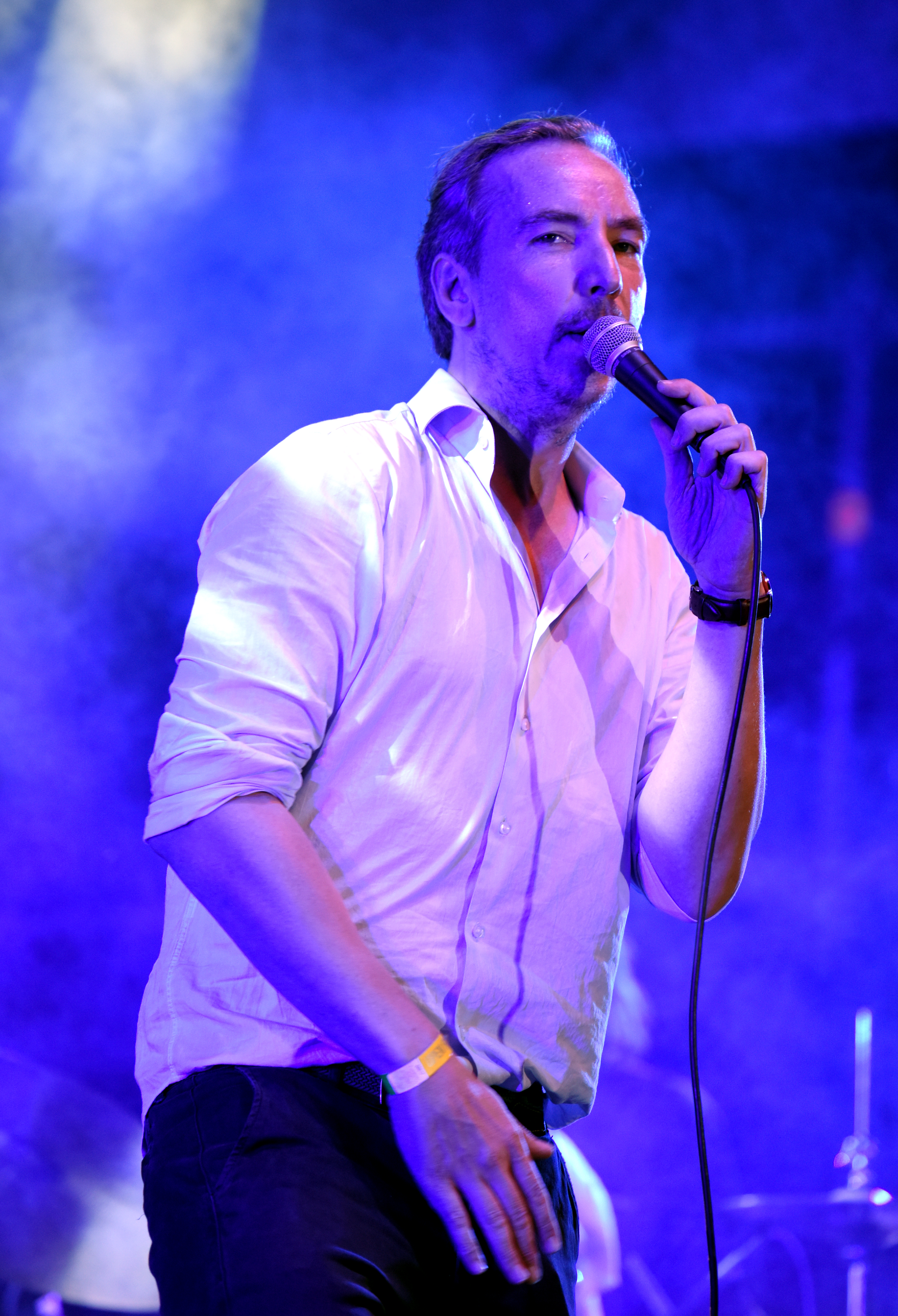
Schulz at the Open Flair festival in Germany, 2015

- 2006: … 4b on "1. 2. 3. …" von Bela B.
- 2009: Mach den Bibo (Do the Bibo)
- 2009: Geheimdienst (Secret Service)
- 2009: Ewig Leben (Live Forever)
- 2012: Spielerfrau (Player's Wife)
- 2013: Rangel Song (Jockey Song)
- 2013: Verhaftet wegen sexy (Arrested Because of Sexy) feat. Bernd Begemann
- 2014: Phase
- 2015: Boogieman
- 2018: Schockst nicht mehr

=== DVDs ===
- 2012: SOS – Showman Olli Schulz Live
- 2015: Schulz in the Box – Die komplette Staffel mit Olli Schulz
