= Extra 3 =

Political satire show

extra 3
- Genre: Political satire
- Developed by: Dieter Kronzucker
- Presented by: Christian Ehring
- Theme music composer: Felice Sound Orchestra
- Opening theme: "The Last Emperor"
- Country of origin: Germany
- Original language: German

Production
- Production locations: Hamburg-Lokstedt, Germany

Original release
- Network: NDR Fernsehen; Das Erste
- Release: 21 June 1976 – present

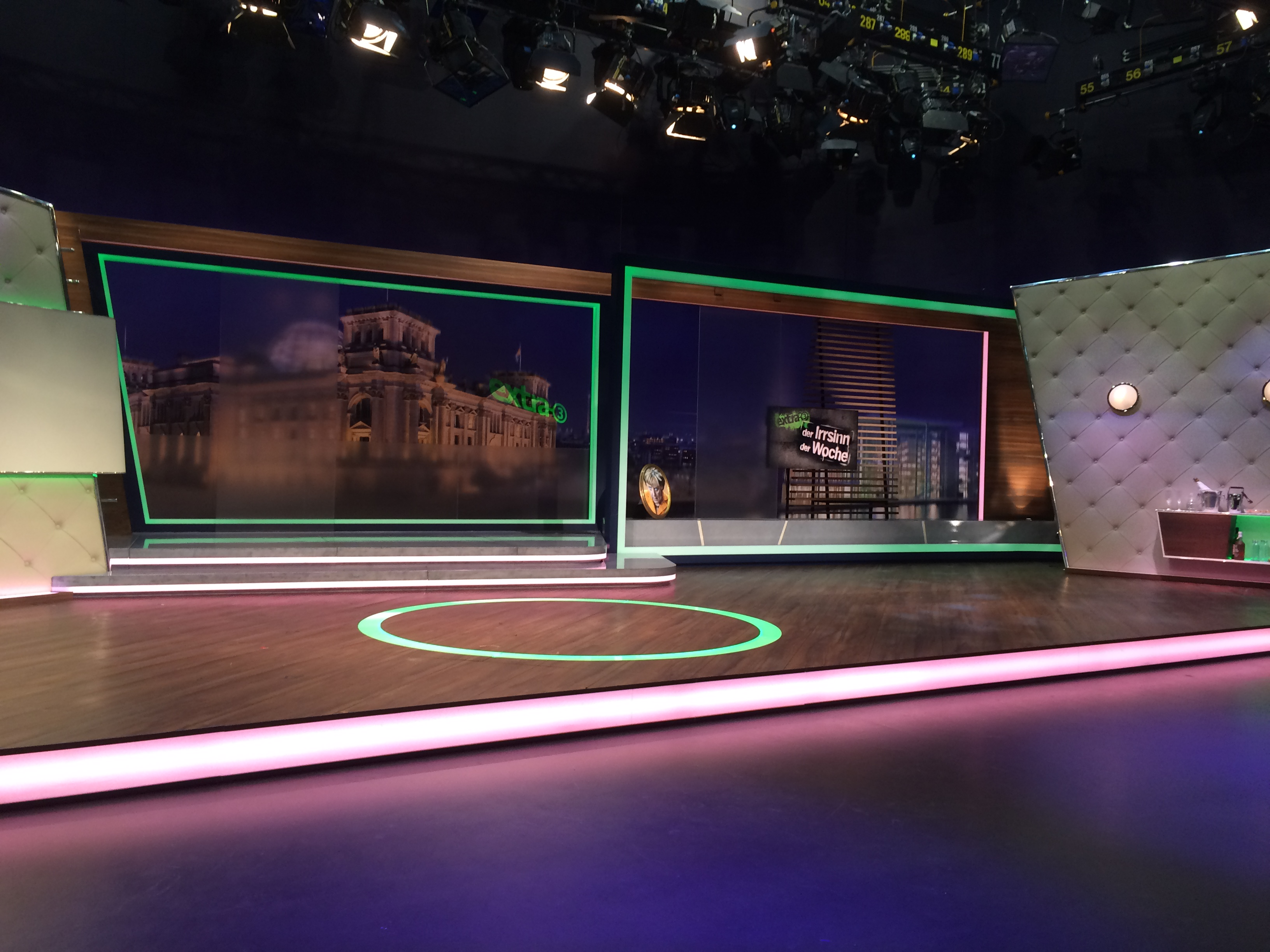
Extra 3 studio

Extra 3 is a weekly political satire show on German television established in 1976. Produced by public television broadcaster Norddeutscher Rundfunk, it is aired on NDR Fernsehen and 3sat. Once a month, the show is promoted to ARD's national first program Das Erste.

Invented by Dieter Kronzucker in 1976, the satire show was initially hosted by himself together with Peter Merseburger and Wolf von Lojewski. Over the years, the show has seen a number of personalities co-hosting the magazine, starting with Lea Rosh, who joined the team in 1977.

== History ==
In 2000, a special edition was co-hosted by leading politicians Cem Özdemir (Alliance 90/The Greens), Thomas Goppel (CSU), Guido Westerwelle (FDP) and Gregor Gysi (Die Linke). Since 2014, Extra 3 offers a YouTube channel with videos of full episodes and clips of regular sub-series such as Realer Irrsinn ('real madness').

=== Erdoğan controversy ===
In its nationally aired show on 17 March 2016, Extra 3 presented a satirical music video titled "Erdowie, Erdowo, Erdogan", adapted from German pop star Nena's song Irgendwie, irgendwo, irgendwann. The two-minute video shows a compilation of some of the most absurd public moments of Turkish president Recep Tayyip Erdoğan and footage of the Turkish government's crackdown on the media, women rights protesters and Kurds, while taking a lenient stance on the "brothers in faith from ISIL". The video also criticizes chancellor Angela Merkel for her migrant deal with Turkey to putting Turkey in the role of cracking down on the refugee influx to the EU, mocking her to "be charming to him since he has you well in hand" (Sei schön charmant, denn er hat Dich in der Hand).

On 22 March, Erdoğan summoned German ambassador Martin Erdmann over the song, asking the German government to intervene and delete the video, as reported by AFP. While representatives of the German government declined to intervene, Extra 3 followed up with English- and Turkish-subtitled versions of the video and republished a number of earlier videos criticizing the Turkish government.

Erdoğan's reaction to a satirical video produced an outcry from the German public with representatives of all German parties criticizing the situation of censorship in Turkey and reaffirming that Germany takes its freedom of the press seriously. Sevim Dağdelen, in charge for foreign policy at the left-wing party Die Linke, demanded "a clear stand" from the foreign office, adding that "our fundamental rights cannot be sacrificed on the altar of the shabby EU-Turkey deal." As reported by a European Commission spokeswoman, Commission President Jean-Claude Juncker said he "does not appreciate" Turkey's decision to call in the ambassador because of a satirical song, and "believes this moves Turkey further from the EU rather than closer to us."

=== Alice Weidel ===
In 2017, Extra 3 called the 2017 lead candidate of the German party AfD, Alice Weidel, a "Nazi bitch", in response to her rallying against political correctness. The Landgericht ('regional court') in Hamburg rejected the suit that Weidel took to court, justifying it with freedom of expression and satire with respect to political figures. Alice Weidel then brought it to the Oberlandesgericht ('higher regional court'), but withdrew it.

=== 2026 Greenland flag-raising incident ===
Amid the Greenland crisis in late January 2026, a team from Extra 3 led by comedian Maxi Schafroth travelled to Greenland's capital Nuuk for a satirical segment intended to criticize Donald Trump's expansionist rhetoric, showing Schaforth pretending to be a US government official and, among other things, raising a US flag up the flagpole of the Katuaq cultural centre. The incident was met with local outrage; passers-by angrily confronted Schafroth before he was able to actually raise the flag, and local officials condemned it as insensitive given the recent tensions. Schafroth was fined 1000 kr. and apologized to local officials. NDR also issued an apology and cancelled the segment's broadcast, with an explanation and apology in its place.
