= Martin Erdmann =

German diplomat

Martin Erdmann (born 25 January 1955) is a German diplomat.

== Career ==
Erdmann was born in Münster, North Rhine-Westphalia, Germany. He joined the German Foreign Service in 1982. In 1984 he completed his diplomatic-consular state exam and became Personal Assistant of Parliamentary State Secretary (State Minister) Alois Mertes at the Foreign Office, Bonn. From 1985 to 1987 he was delegated as Second Secretary to the German Embassy Helsinki and subsequently until 1990 as First Secretary to the German Delegation to NATO, Brussels.

In 1990 he returned to the Foreign Office in Bonn as Desk Officer at the Press Division. In 1993 he was appointed Deputy Press Spokesman of the Federal Foreign Office, Bonn and in 1995 Federal Foreign Minister Klaus Kinkel (Fifth Kohl cabinet) appointed him Spokesman of the Federal Foreign Office, Bonn, a task which Ambassador Erdmann held until summer 1999, after the change of government in fall 1998 under Federal Foreign Minister Joschka Fischer.

As preparation for subsequent missions as Minister Counsellor and Minister Plenipotentiary (Deputy Ambassador) at the German Delegation to NATO, Brussels he completed Senior Course 95 for NATO executives at the NATO Defence College, Rome (August 1999 until February 2000). Following his mission as Minister Plenipotentiary Erdmann joined the international staff of NATO Headquarters, Brussels in summer 2005. He was appointed by the then NATO Secretary General Jaap de Hoop Scheffer to NATO Assistant Secretary General for Political Affairs corresponding to the role of Political Director at a national Foreign Ministry.

In January 2010 he returned for a short period to the Foreign Office in Berlin until he was appointed Permanent Representative of the Federal Republic of Germany on the North Atlantic Council, Brussels in March 2010. From 1 October 2014 until end of July 2015 he acted as Dean of the North Atlantic Council (NAC).

Since August 2015 Erdmann has been serving as Ambassador of the Federal Republic of Germany in Turkey. During his time in office, Turkey's Foreign Ministry summoned him in March 2016 over a satirical broadcast by German television station NDR that featured "Erdowie, Erdowo, Erdoğan", a two-minute satirical song mocking Turkish President Recep Tayyip Erdoğan. In March 2017, the foreign ministry summoned him again after the municipality of Gaggenau in southwestern Germany revoked permission for a campaign event for that year's constitutional referendum at which Turkish Justice Minister Bekir Bozdağ was to appear.

== Recognition ==
Erdmann is recipient of foreign orders of merit as well as decorations and medals. Erdmann is married and has three children.
