= Jan Böhmermann =

German satirist and television presenter

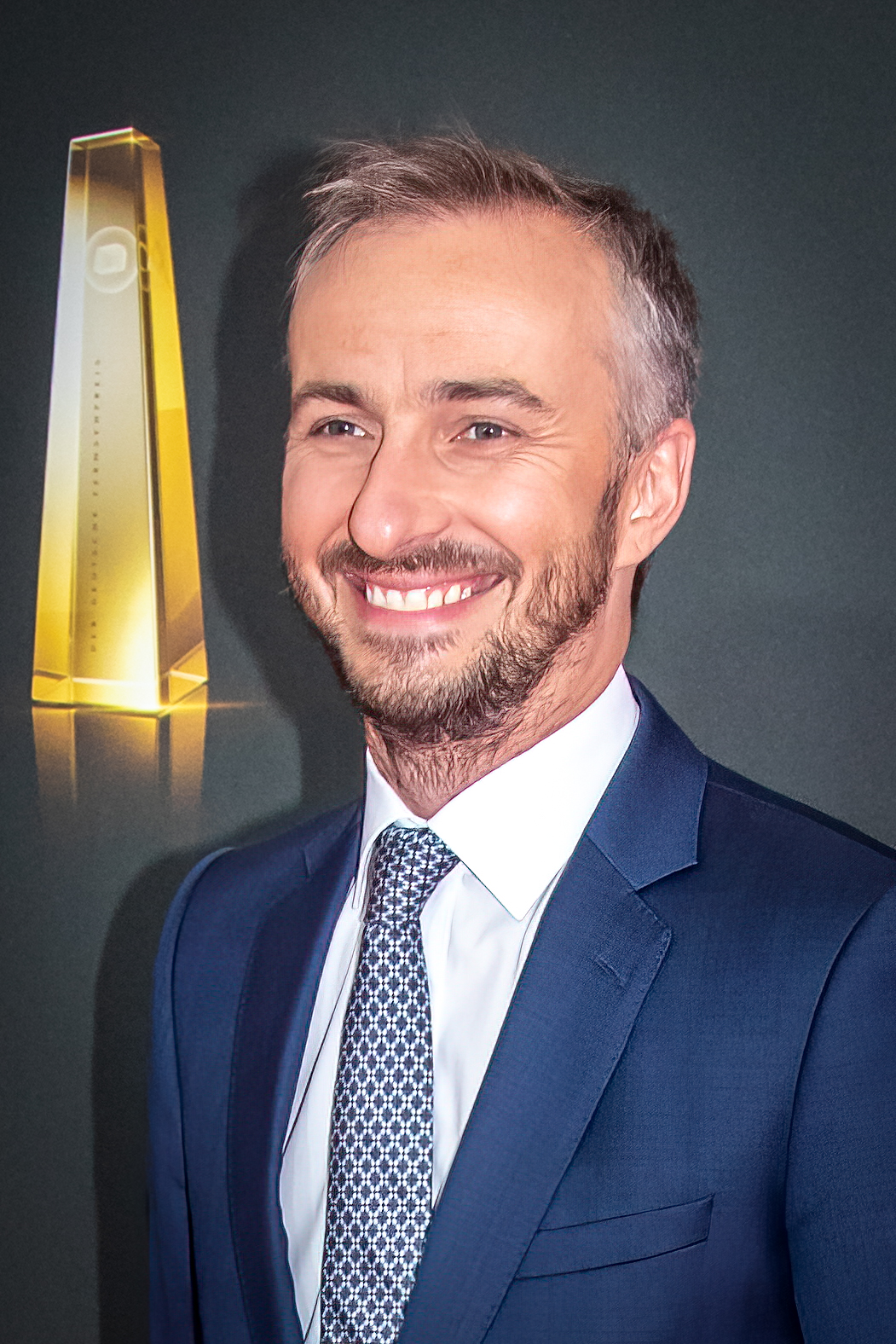
- Böhmermann at the 2021 German Television Awards
- Born: 23 February 1981 (age 45); Bremen, West Germany

Comedy career
- Years active: 1999–present
- Medium: Television; radio; Internet
- Genres: Late-night talk show; comedy; satire; musical comedy; parody
- Website: boehmermann.de

Jan Böhmermann (German pronunciation: [jan ˈbøːmɐˌman]) (born 23 February 1981) is a German left-wing satirist, journalist, and television host. He also worked as a writer, producer, radio host, and is best known for his activism through publicity stunts.

== Early life and education ==
Böhmermann was born and raised in Bremen. His mother had immigrated to Germany in the early 1970s, and was part of the German minority in Poland. His father died from leukemia when Böhmermann was 17 years old. Even though he remains silent about his private life, it is known that he has at least one child. He served as a lay judge at the local court of Cologne.

== Career ==
In 1997, Böhmermann gained his first journalistic experience at Die Norddeutsche, a local edition of Bremen's daily newspapers. In 1999, he began working as a moderator and reporter at Radio Bremen. He applied to three drama schools, was rejected every time, and a fourth time successfully at the Hanover University of Music, Drama and Media but which he did not complete. He also dropped out of his studies at the University of Cologne in history, sociology, and theater, film, and television studies.

In 2004, he moved to 1Live on WDR as a presenter and comedian. There he invented the column Lukas' Tagebuch ('Lukas' diary'), a parody of the Cologne professional soccer player Lukas Podolski. Podolski sued against it without success and refused interview requests from ARD during the 2006 World Cup. For the 2008 European Soccer-Championship, Böhmermann launched the podcast Pod-Olski – Der EM-Podcast von Lukas, which made it to the top of the iTunes podcast charts. In the follow-up series Lukas' WG, Böhmermann moved his main character into a shared apartment with the mascot of 1. FC Köln, billy goat Hennes.

In 2007, WDR television broadcast Böhmermann's six-part comedy show Echt Böhmermann. In January 2009, Böhmermann founded the First Turkish Carnival Club of Germany (1st TKVD) as part of a satirical action for the RTL program TV-Helden. This action inspired a group of Turkish carnivalists from Dortmund to found a real first Turkish carnival club. The program TV-Helden was awarded the 2009 German Television Prize in the category "Best Comedy Program". The program was also awarded the German Television Award. In the same year, Böhmermann published his first book Alles, alles über Deutschland – Halbwissen kompakt. From 2009, Böhmermann was a member of the ensemble of Harald Schmidt's program on ARD. Until 2011, the radio station 1Live ran the monthly satire and entertainment program " Die ganz große Jan Böhmermann Radioschau.

In 2010, Böhmermann joined Lateline and wrote the column Gott fragt, Böhmermann antwortet (God asks, Böhmermann answers) for the youth edition of the Süddeutsche Zeitung newspaper. Until April 2011, he hosted Beeck & Böhmermann on 1Live together with Simon Beeck.

Starting in January 2011, Böhmermann toured Germany for several weeks with Klaas Heufer-Umlauf with the satirical improv cabaret show Zwei alte Hasen erzählen von früher. With Heufer-Umlauf, Böhmermann hosted a bi-weekly show on Radio Eins from November 2011 to September 2012 under the same title. Since Heufer-Umlauf's departure, he has hosted the show with singer-songwriter Olli Schulz. Initially under the new title "Joko und Klaas mit Olli und Jan", then under the title Sanft & Sorgfältig. From March 2013, Schulz and Böhmermann weekly went on air. Since May 2014, Sanft & Sorgfältig was broadcast on Sundays by five other radio stations (Bremen Vier, Dasding, N-Joy, Puls and You FM) in addition to Radio Eins. In April 2016, Böhmermann announced that he would not continue the show. He rejected a connection with the Böhmermann-Erdoğan affair.

From September 2011 until the cancellation of the show, Böhmermann was on the team of the Harald Schmidt Show on Sat.1. In 2019, Schmidt said of Böhmermann: "I knew early on that Böhmermann would never make it as a moderator. But that he would make it very far as a riot act, I also knew."

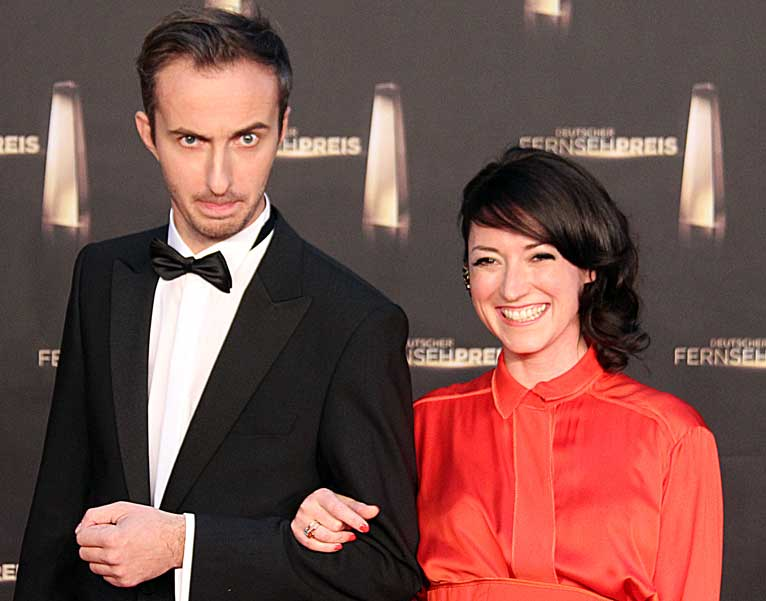
Böhmermann and Charlotte Roche at the German Television Awards in 2012

The talk show Roche & Böhmermann (co-hosted with Charlotte Roche) was the first broadcast on ZDFkultur on 4 March 2012. After two seasons, the last edition was shown in October 2012. In January 2013, ZDF announced that there would be no continuation of the show due to disagreements between those involved.

In November and December 2012, he went on tour with Lateline through the cities of Bremen, Frankfurt, Baden-Baden, Magdeburg, and Hanover. The shows were broadcast live on EinsPlus. Starting in April 2013, a second season with seven shows ran live from the Weserhaus in Bremen. The third season with five more shows was broadcast starting in November 2013.

Together with Klaas Heufer-Umlauf, Böhmermann recorded the radio play Förderschulklassenfahrt, which was continued in 2014 with the title Förderschulklassenfahrt 2 – Fünf Feinde und der Proletenhund.

In October 2013, Das Erste broadcast the program 16 × Germany, in which each German state was covered in 15-minute features. The focus was left to the authors. Böhmermann devoted himself to his hometown of Bremen. With his documentary-like satire, "audience and contributors were taken for a ride," as the media service Kressreport criticized. A museum expert interviewed by Böhmermann was deceived about the satirical intentions, and the film team put an invective into the mouth of a city hall doorman without consultation. Böhmermann completely invented two police officers who allegedly obstructed the filming and an alleged professor, without this being recognizable to the viewers. The responsible broadcaster, Radio Bremen, defended Böhmermann's film as a mockumentary that "mercilessly uses and exaggerates the means of the documentary."

From October 2013 to December 2019, he hosted the political-satirical late-night show Neo Magazin on ZDFneo. It was, like Roche & Böhmermann, produced by bildundtonfabrik. ZDF has shown a repeat of the show on Friday nights since February 2015, since then named "addition Royale.

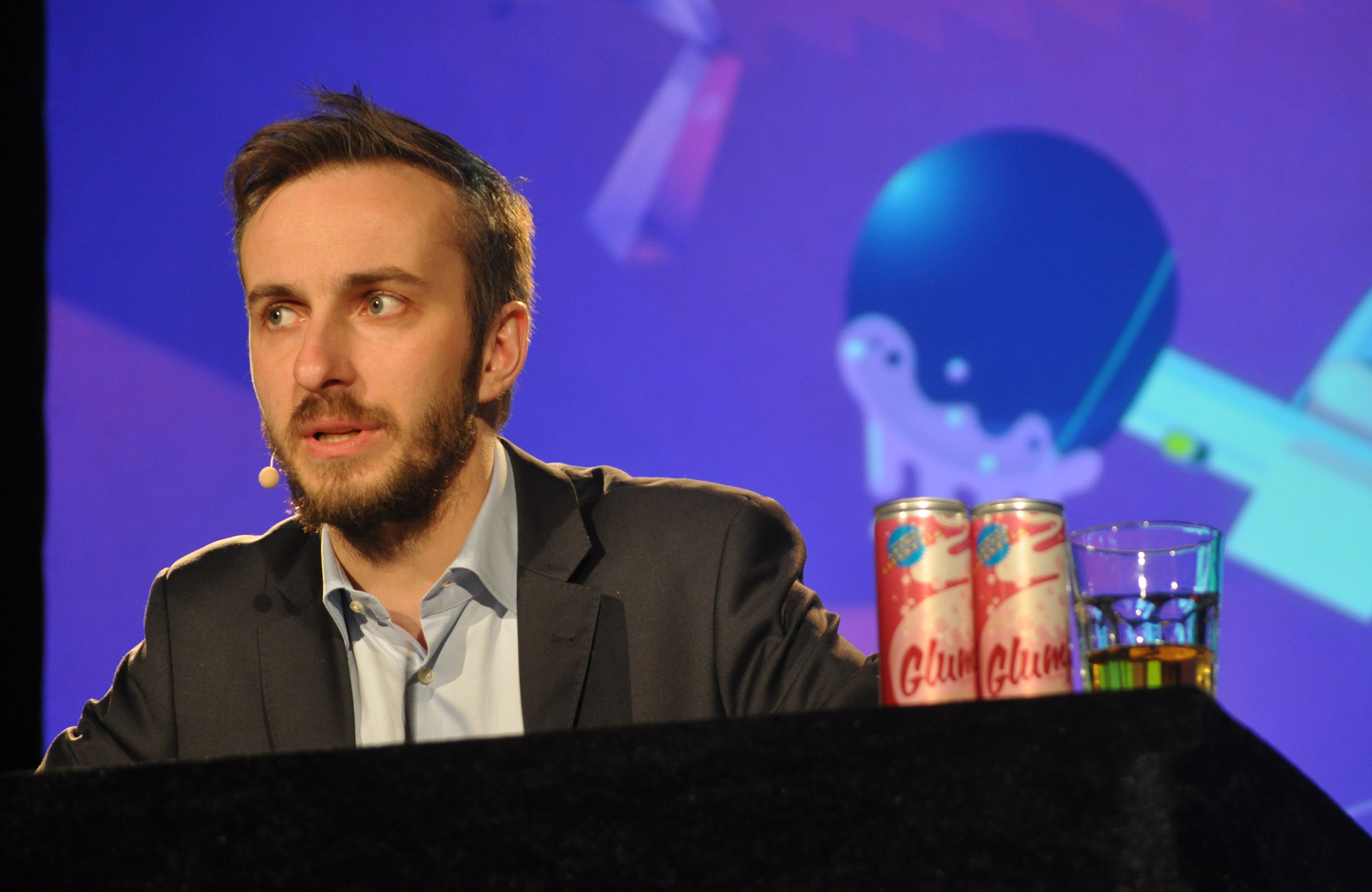
Böhmermann on his Schlimmer als Jan Böhmermann tour in Rostock in 2014

Starting in March 2014, Böhmermann went on tour in Germany with his stage program "Schlimmer als Jan Böhmermann", in which he preserves jokes and one-liners from his previous shows and publications.

In February 2014, the television station RTL announced that it would be testing Was wäre wenn?, a new comedy program with Böhmermann, Palina Rojinski, Katrin Bauerfeind and Jan Köppen. A pilot had been made back in 2012, and the first four episodes were recorded in March 2014 at the nobeo studios in Hürth. The first episode was broadcast on 28 August 2014 on RTL. The series was nominated in the category Comedy for the German Television Award 2014.

Böhmermann was the author of the show Die unwahrscheinlichen Ereignisse im Leben von ... ("The unlikely events in the life of..."), which, like his own show, was produced by bildundtonfabrik. The show features a celebrity guest with sketches and live performances. On 20 July 2014, the first episode aired on WDR with guest Frank Elstner.

In August 2015, Böhmermann and Olli Schulz announced in Neo Magazin Royale that they would produce a new edition of Roche & Böhmermann called Schulz & Böhmermann broadcast on ZDFneo starting on 10 January 2016. The texts introducing the invited guests were written and spoken by Sibylle Berg. Ten more episodes followed in 2017, but at the end of the year, Schulz & Böhmermann was discontinued due to too low viewer numbers.

Since 15 May 2016, Schulz and Böhmermann have jointly hosted the podcast Fest & Flauschig as a successor to their former show Sanft & Sorgfältig on Radio Eins. The podcast is produced for Spotify and in 2018, it was the most-streamed Spotify podcast worldwide. The podcast appeared weekly until early 2020. After 2020, when the podcast was expanded to twice weekly, Böhmermann and Schulz announced in the 18 March 2020 episode that due to the COVID-19 pandemic they would indefinitely release a shorter Fest und Flauschig: Zuhause podcast daily, i.e. from Tuesday to Friday and in addition to their regular Sunday podcast. These special shows aired in a weekday format from 26 March to 24 April. After the podcasts's summer break in 2024, Schulz and Böhmermann returned to recording and releasing Fest & Flauschig once per week.

On 24 April 2017, Böhmermann became the first German comedian to guest on the U.S. talk show Late Night.

Böhmermann regularly advocates for the welfare of refugees and criticizes European refugee policies. He particularly dislikes the bans, criminalization attempts, and threatened prosecution of private sea rescue services. In the case of the arrest of German captain Claus-Peter Reisch and the seizure of the Lifeline sea rescue ship in Malta in July 2018, Böhmermann launched a fundraising campaign and collected around 200,000 euros in favor of a legal aid fund. Also on the occasion of the arrest of German sea rescue captain Carola Rackete in Italy at the end of June 2019, Böhmermann, together with the presenter Klaas Heufer-Umlauf, called for donations for her and the German non-governmental organisation Sea-Watch. Within a few days, almost one million euros was collected.

On 29 August 2019, Böhmermann announced in a satirical broadcast that he wanted to become SPD party chairman. A month later, he joined the party.

In March 2022, he released a porn movie he produced titled "FFMM straight / queer doggy BJ ORAL orgasm squirting ROYALE (gebührenfinanziert)" directed by Paulita Pappel and financed by German mandatory TV tax.

== Controversies ==
=== "V for Varoufakis" video, 2015 ===
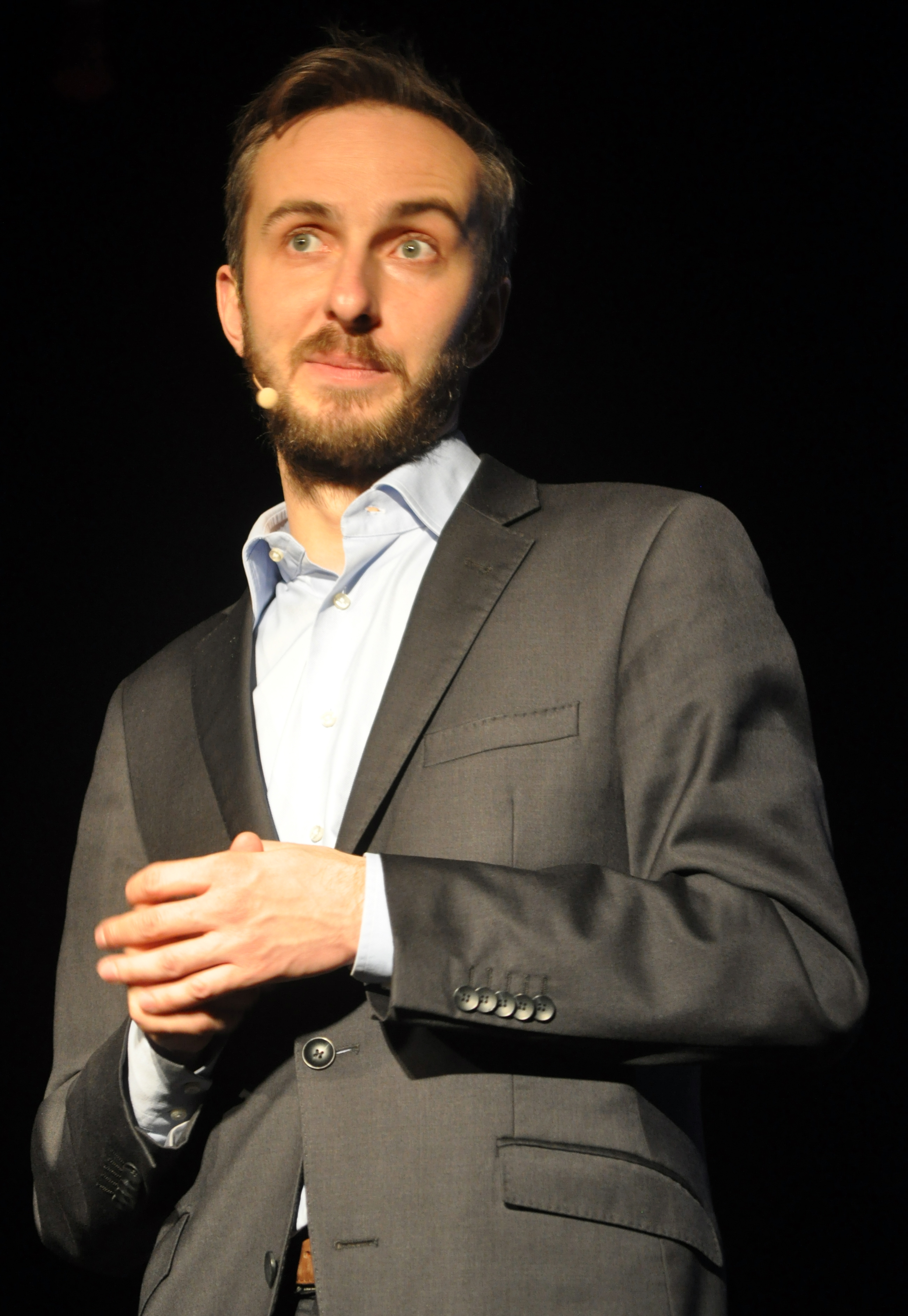
Böhmermann in 2014

In February 2015, Böhmermann's late-night show Neo Magazin Royale created the song and music video "V for Varoufakis". The title references V for Vendetta, which introduced the Guy Fawkes mask as a symbol of rebellion. In addition to poking fun at Germans generally, the video explored the German fascination with Greek finance minister Yanis Varoufakis, who is regarded as articulate, physically attractive and having a stylish, unconventional fashion sense, while also portraying Greece's dependence on German money during the Greek government-debt crisis. Unlike most content on the ZDF program Neo Magazin Royale, the song is in English rather than German.

The conclusion of the video shows an actual clip of Varoufakis in which he says "and stick the finger to Germany, and say 'well, you can now solve this problem for yourself'. Right?" The clip shows Varoufakis giving the finger. This clip had been taken out of context: Varoufakis had used a rhetorical example of what not to do. After TV host Günther Jauch confronted Varoufakis with the video clip in an interview (still out of context), German news media made the issue of Varoufakis giving Germany the finger into a minor scandal. The New York Times ran an article with the title "German Media Want Greek Finance Minister's Head Over 'Fingergate'". Varoufakis himself briefly claimed that the video must have been doctored. NZZ am Sonntag called for Günther Jauch to be fired for bad journalism.

In response to the claims of the middle finger being either fake or real, Böhmermann's Neo Magazine Royale created a false version of the video clip labelled #varoufake, which claimed to show that Varoufakis had not given the finger, and that the clip Neo Magazine Royale had used in "V for Varoufakis" was indeed a fabrication. At 8:10 in the video, Böhmermann says the following:

Dear editorial staff of Günther Jauch, Yanis Varoufakis is wrong, you did not falsify the footage. You simply took it out of context and gave him the runaround, so that the average German could pursue their passion for being angered. "Foreigner. Out of Europe you go!" "He's poor and takes our money. That's just not possible! We are the bosses in here!" That's what you did. The rest is our effort.

This passage of the #varoufake video caused confusion; the BBC interpreted it as an admission that the video in which the finger was given was the original footage. However, as explained in the rest of the video, the editors of NEO Magazine Royal edited it. The media were unclear as to which version was not manipulated, and ZDF had to officially state that Neo Magazin Royale is satire and should not be taken at face value. Varoufakis himself praised Böhmermann's mockery of the German media on Twitter, writing "@janboehm Humour, satire & self deprecation are great solvents of blind nationalism. We politicians need you badly." Böhmermann won a Grimme-Preis award for the manipulated finger video.

=== Erdoğan satire, 2016 ===
In mid-March, the German political satire TV show extra 3 aired a critical song about Erdoğan, which led to protests of the Turkish government. Two weeks later, on 31 March 2016 Böhmermann presented a poem named "Schmähkritik" ("abusive criticism") about Turkish president Recep Tayyip Erdoğan in his satire show Neo Magazin Royale on the ZDF public channel. Afterwards, twenty people lodged a complaint. Proceedings instituted by the prosecutor's office for "insulting of organs and representatives of foreign states" were based on principles §103 and §104 in the German penal code. In the satire, Böhmermann called Turkish president Recep Tayyip Erdoğan "the man who beats girls", and said that Erdoğan loved to "fuck goats and suppress minorities, kick Kurds, hit Christians, and watch child pornography." Much of the rest of the poem was devoted to associating Erdoğan with various less accepted forms of sexuality. Böhmermann deliberately played with the limits of satire and said several times that this form of abusive criticism was not allowed in Germany.

The ZDF channel distanced itself from the poem and cut it out of the program which can be seen in its online media library (Mediathek). After a phone call with the Turkish prime minister Ahmet Davutoğlu, Chancellor Angela Merkel criticised the poem as "intentionally hurtful" ("bewusst verletzend"), and prosecutors in Mainz planned to consult the federal Justice Ministry on whether to launch criminal proceedings. The Turkish government released a verbal note in which it demanded the criminal prosecution of Böhmermann. According to the law, the government has to approve the demand for criminal prosecution by a foreign government, before criminal proceedings can be started because of §103/104 StGB. Therefore Angela Merkel accepted the request from Turkey to seek his prosecution, but stressed that the acceptance was not due to the merits of the prosecution case. In addition, Erdoğan himself made a complaint against Böhmermann as a private person because of the alleged insult. The vice minister president of Turkey, Numan Kurtulmuş, called the poem a "serious crime against humanity".

On 10 April 2016 the CEO of publishing house Axel Springer SE, Mathias Döpfner, made a plea for "solidarity with Jan Böhmermann". He compared Böhmermann's poem to the works of Martin Kippenberger. He also referenced Michel Houellebecq's Submission and accused the German government of kowtowing to the Turks. The former Greek finance minister Yanis Varoufakis wrote on Twitter: "Europe first lost its soul (agreement with Turkey on refugees), now it is losing its humour. Hands off @janboehm!" More than 100,000 people signed a petition for Böhmermann at Change.org. In a satirical letter to president Erdoğan, the mayor of Tübingen, Boris Palmer (Alliance 90/The Greens), assured Erdoğan his "solidarity" and demanded the extradition of Böhmermann to Turkey. "Cut off Böhmermann's testicles, so he never makes fun of presidents with a short dick again", he wrote. The letter is signed "most respectfully, Boris Palmer".

An April 2016 YouGov poll revealed, that a majority of the Germans supported Böhmermann's position. 48 percent of the pollees found the poem appropriate, 29 percent view it as undue. A great majority (66 percent) opposed the deletion of the poem on the ZDF website as well as Merkel's criticism of the poem as "intentionally hurtful" (68 percent). Only 15% support a criminal investigation, with 77% against.

In April 2016 it was reported that Böhmermann was under police protection, because he was threatened by supporters of Erdoğan. The filming of the upcoming edition of Neo Magazin Royale was cancelled due to "massive media reporting and the focus on the programme and the presenter". Böhmermann had also cancelled his radio show Sanft & Sorgfältig on Sunday and his appearance at the Grimme Awards, where he was awarded for his Varoufakis video.

In October 2016, prosecutors dropped the case, saying they had not found sufficient evidence to continue the inquiry against Böhmermann. Subsequently, in 2018, the rarely used paragraph 103 of Germany's penal code, which criminalized insults against foreign heads of state, under which Böhmermann was indicted, was abolished.

== Works ==
=== Radio ===
- 1999–2004: Radio Bremen
- 2009–2011: Die ganz große Jan Böhmermann Radioschau
- 2010–2013: Lateline
- 2011–2012: Zwei alte Hasen erzählen von früher, with Klaas Heufer-Umlauf
- 2012: Joko und Klaas mit Olli und Jan, with Olli Schulz
- 2012–2016: Sanft & Sorgfältig, with Olli Schulz

=== Podcast ===
- 2012 – 2016 Sanft & Sorgfältig, with Olli Schulz
- since 2016: Fest & Flauschig (Spotify), with Olli Schulz

=== Television ===
- 2007: Echt Böhmermann (WDR Fernsehen)
- 2009: TV Helden (RTL)
- 2012: Roche & Böhmermann (ZDFkultur), with Charlotte Roche
- 2012–2013: Lateline (EinsPlus)
- 2013–2014: Neo Magazin (ZDFneo)
- 2014: Was wäre, wenn? (RTL), with Palina Rojinski, Katrin Bauerfeind and Jan Köppen
- 2015–2019: Neo Magazin Royale (ZDFneo, ZDF)
- 2016–2017: Schulz & Böhmermann (ZDFneo), with Olli Schulz
- Since 2018: Lass dich überwachen! (ZDF)
- Since 2020: ZDF Magazin Royale (ZDF)

=== Books ===
Print

- 2016: Alles, alles über Deutschland. Halbwissen kompakt. (Everything, everything about Germany. Superficial knowledge compact.) (Kiepenheuer & Witsch)
- 2020: Gefolgt von niemandem, dem du folgst: Twitter-Tagebuch. 2009–2020. (Not Followed by Anyone You Follow. Twitter Diary 2009–2020.) (Kiepenheuer & Witsch)

Audio

- 2005: Da Original Shaggä – Biddebaba. (G+H Hamburg)
- 2009: Lukas' Tagebuch live (Roof Music)
- 2009: Jan Böhmermann liest Alles, alles über Deutschland (Roof Music)
- 2013: Förderschulklassenfahrt (Roof Music), along with Klaas Heufer-Umlauf
- 2014: Förderschulklassenfahrt 2: Fünf Feinde und der Proletenhund (Roof Music), along with Klaas Heufer-Umlauf

=== Albums ===
- 2016: Neo Magazin Royale: Live in Concert

=== Singles ===
- 2015: V for Varoufakis
- 2015: Mit wem war Mutti im Bett? ("Who was mummy in bed with?")
- 2015: Besoffen bei Facebook ("Drunk on Facebook")
- 2015: Baby Got Laugengebäck
- 2015: Ich hab Polizei ("I have police"), as POL1Z1STENS0HN (Note: A leet-speak stylization of the word Polizistensohn meaning 'son of police officers'.) a.k.a. Jan Böhmermann
- 2016: Be Deutsch! ("Be German!")
- 2016: Blasserdünnerjunge macht sein Job ("Pale-skinny-boy does his job"), as POL1Z1STENS0HN a.k.a. Jan Böhmermann
- 2016: Grab US by the Pussy
- 2017: Menschen Leben Tanzen Welt ("Humans Life Dancing World"), as Jim Pandzko feat. Jan Böhmermann
- 2019: Herz und Faust und Zwinker Zwinker ("Heart and Fist and Winker Winker (Note: Winker being a winking face emoji.)") as POL1Z1STENS0HN
- 2020: Bürgermeister ("Mayor"), as POL1Z1STENS0HN
- 2021: Ischgl-Fieber (Husti Husti Heh!) ("Ischgl fever (cough cough heh!)"), as Tommy Tellerlift feat. the Fangzauner Schneebrunzer
- 2021: Warum hört der Fahrradweg einfach hier auf? ("Why is the bike path just ending here?")
- 2022: Micha (Was hast Du mir nur angetan?) ("Micah (What Have You Done to Me?)"), as Jürgen Michaels
- 2022: Right Time to Thiel
- 2022: Lass das Gürteltier in Ruhe! ("Leave the Armadillo Alone!"), as Jan Zookowski

=== Stage programs ===
- 2005: Boombastic Fantastic – ein Schmuseabend mit Da Original Shaggä, Comedy
- 2007: Lukas' Auswärtsspiel, Reading
- 2008: Lukas' Auswärtsspiel – Saison 2008/2009, Reading
- 2009: Lukas' Rückspiel – Saison 2008/2009, Reading
- 2009: Alles, alles über Deutschland, Lecture tour
- 2009: Die ganz große Jan Böhmermann Radio-Show, Comedy
- 2011: Zwei alte Hasen erzählen von früher, Comedy, along with Klaas Heufer-Umlauf
- 2014: Schlimmer als Jan Böhmermann, Cabaret/Comedy

=== Executive producer ===
- 2014–2016: Die unwahrscheinlichen Ereignisse im Leben von…

== Awards ==
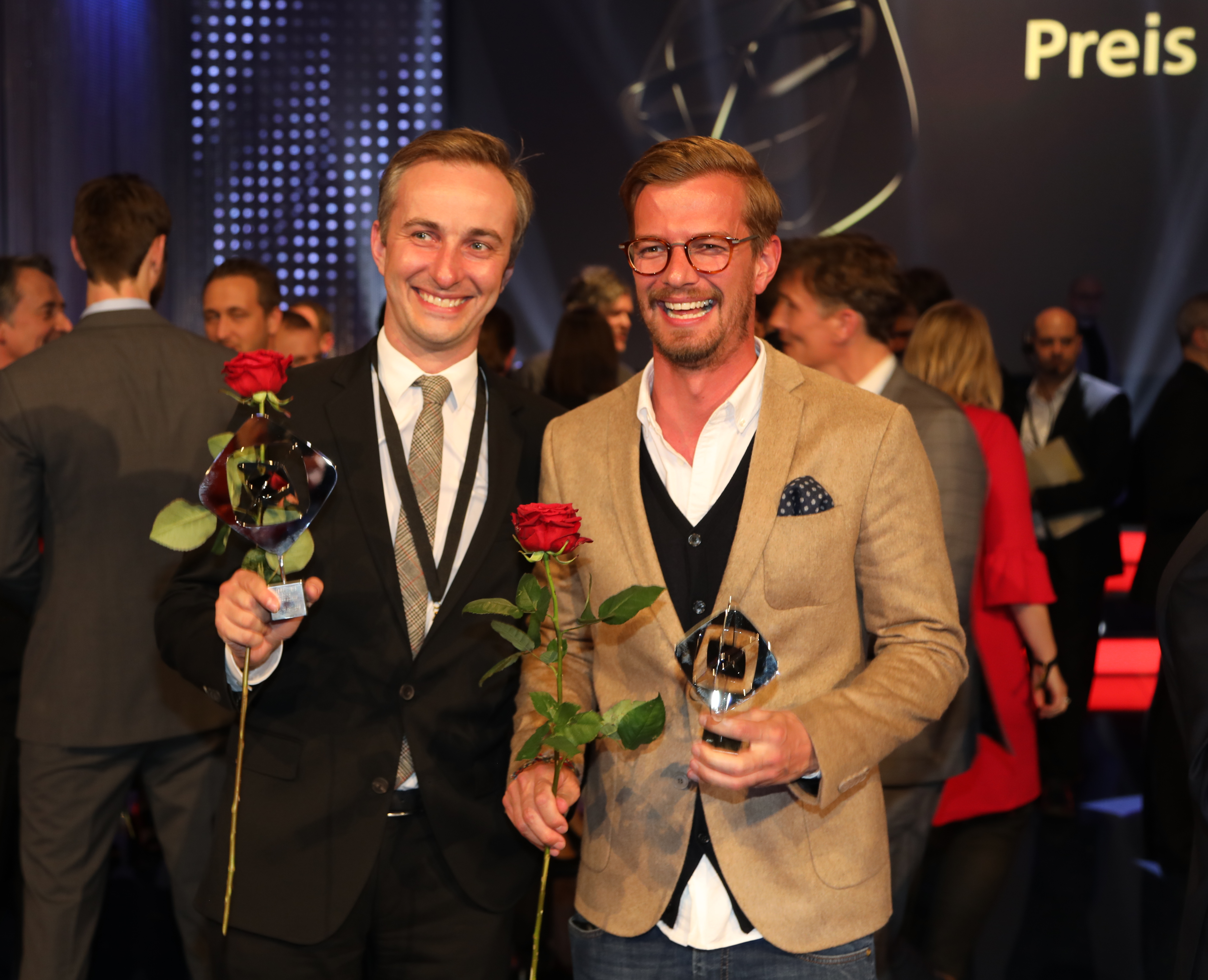
Böhmermann (left) and Joko Winterscheidt at the 2018 Grimme Awards

- 2009: Deutscher Fernsehpreis in the category Best Comedy for TV Helden
- 2013: Entertainment Journalist of the Year 2012 (Medium Magazin)
- 2013: Grimme-Preis nomination in the category Entertainment for Roche & Böhmermann
- 2014: Grimme-Preis in the category Entertainment for Neo Magazin
- 2014: Journalist of the Year in the category Entertainment/Culture
- 2016: Deutscher Fernsehpreis in the category Best Late Night Entertainment for Neo Magazin Royale
- 2016: Grimme-Preis in the category Entertainment/Special/Innovation for #Varoufake in the program Neo Magazin Royale
- 2016: Grimme Honor Award
- 2017: Goldene Kamera Digital Award in the category viral clip for BE DEUTSCH
- 2017: Deutscher Fernsehpreis in the category Best Late Night Entertainment for Neo Magazin Royale
- 2017: Grimme-Preis in the category Entertainment/Special/Innovation for #verafake / Einspielerschleife in the program Neo Magazin Royale
- 2017: Award of the German Academy of Television in the category Entertainment for Schulz & Böhmermann
- 2018: Grimme-Preis in the category Entertainment for Eier aus Stahl – Max Giesinger und die deutsche Industriemusik in the program Neo Magazin Royale
- 2023: Karl-Eduard-von-Schnitzler-Preis, a satirical prize named after Karl Eduard von Schnitzler, who was a leading journalist (and as such responsible for disinformation and propaganda in the interest of the communist regime) in the state broadcasting corporation of the German Democratic Republic
