= Ich hab Polizei =

2015 song by Jan Böhmermann

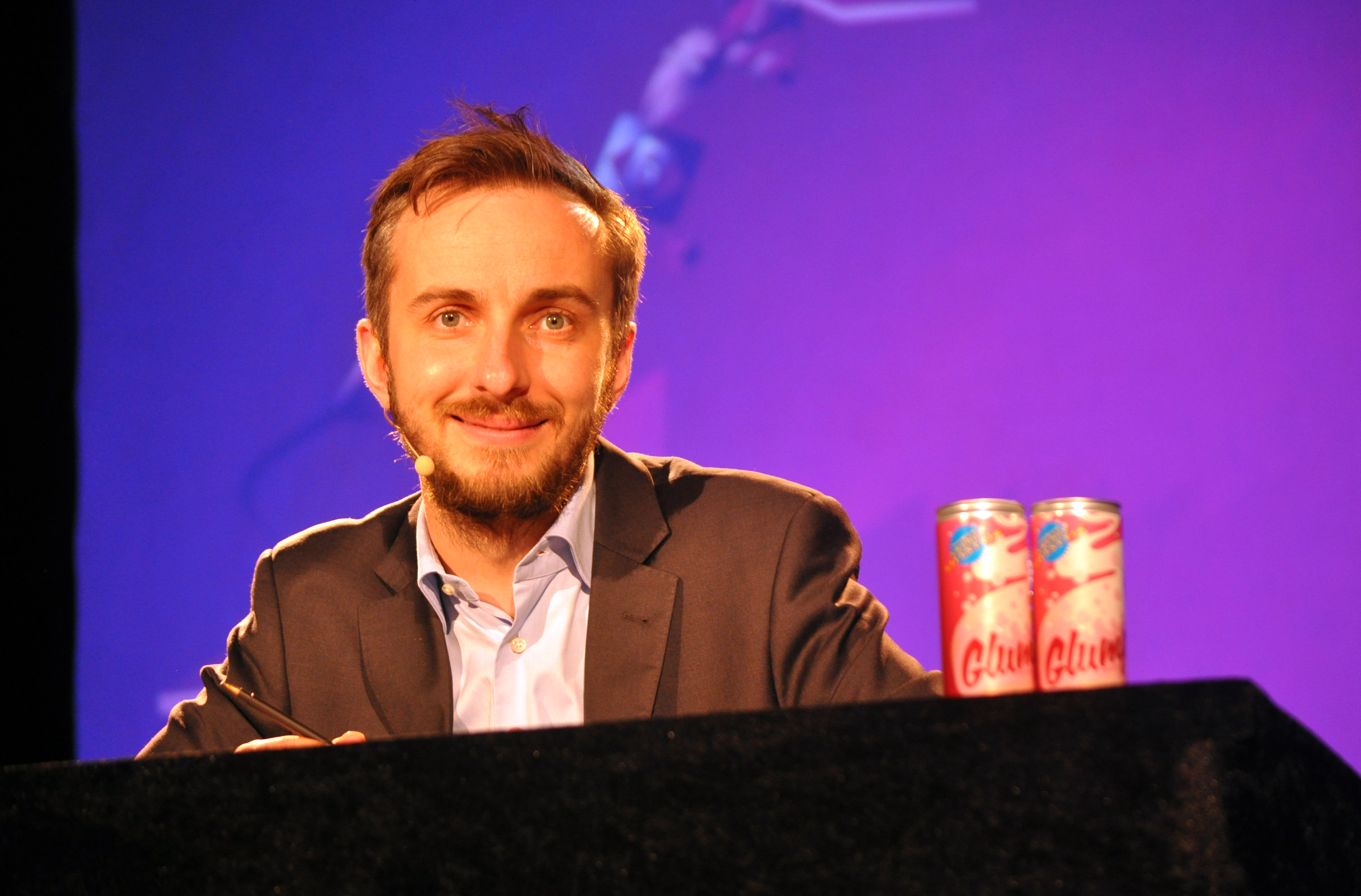
Jan Böhmermann in 2014

Ich hab Polizei (German for "I have police") is a rap song published in 2015 by Jan Böhmermann, a German TV presenter. For the song, he used the pseudonym POL1Z1STENS0HN (German for "policeman's son" in leetspeak). The song and the sociolect used in it caused a debate in Germany.

== Popular and critical reception ==
According to the download rankings of GfK Entertainment, the song reached the rank of six in its first week. It entered the German single charts on 4 December at rank ten.

The song and the video met criticism by journalists and rappers as it was faced with allegations of appropriating cultural expressions of the lower classes on account of mocking them from a middle class point of view. They also expressed the concern of the video condoning police violence.

== Video ==
On 26 November 2015, the video to the song was presented on the ZDFneo channel in the show Neo Magazin Royale.

The video is a spoof on gangster rap and seems to praise the police. However, it also portrays police brutality ("you break law, police breaks your legs", "police has fun"), seemingly with approval. The video shows Böhmermann confronted with a gang of criminals. He calls 110 on his mobile and is transformed into a rapper surrounded by several police officers. The video seemingly "disses" (disrespects) gangsters and their resources by pointing out the vast powers of the police ("you walk your pit bull, police got a hundred kennels full of combat dogs in barracks").
