= Boom Chicago =

Dutch comedy group

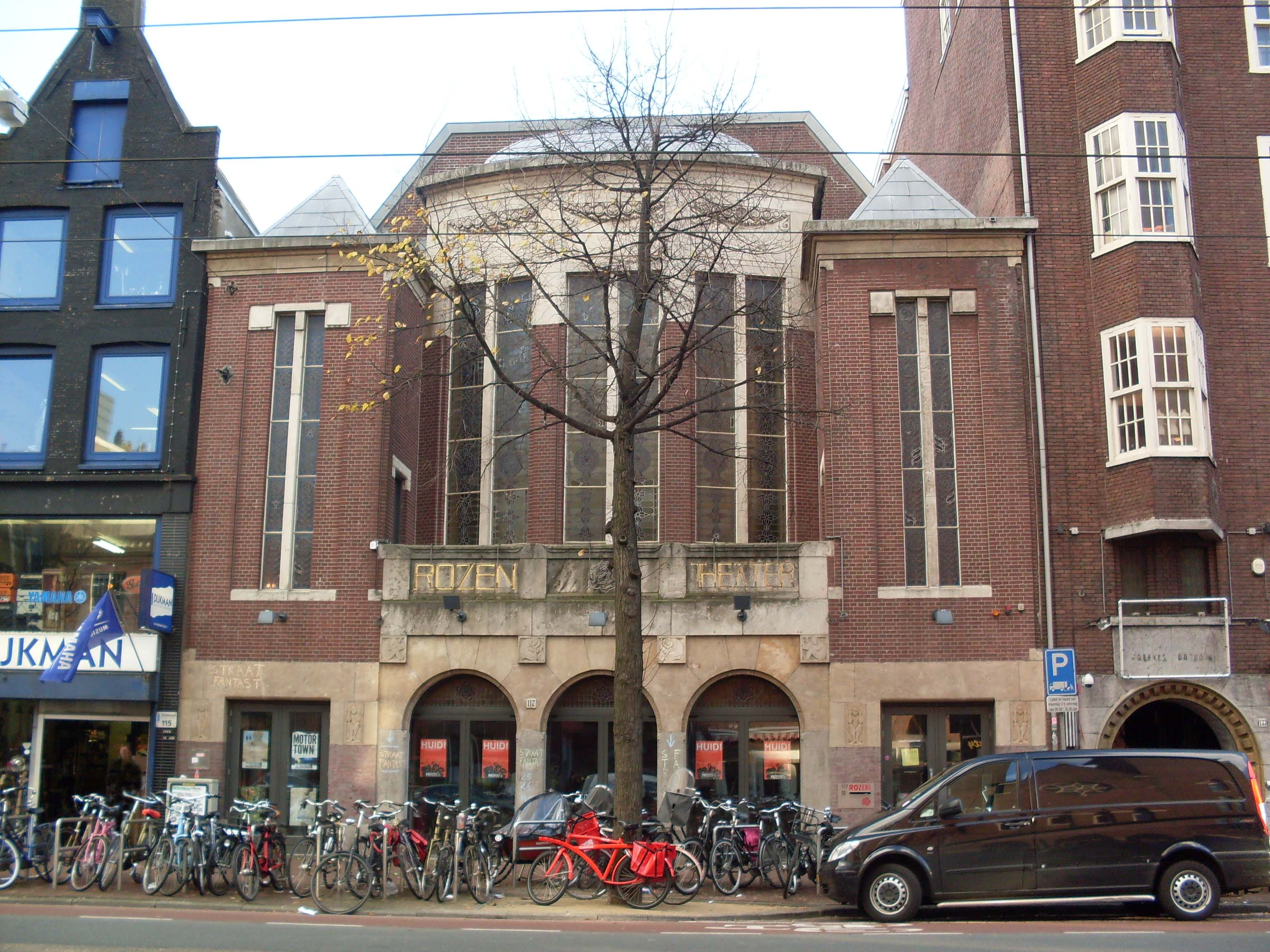
- Boom Chicago's theater on the Rozengracht in Amsterdam
- Genre: Sketch comedy Improvisation
- Date of premiere: 1993
- Location: Amsterdam, Netherlands

Creative team
- Co-founder/co-owner: Andrew Moskos
- Co-founder/co-owner: Pep Rosenfeld
- Co-founder: Ken Schaefle
- Co-owner: Saskia Maas
- Official website

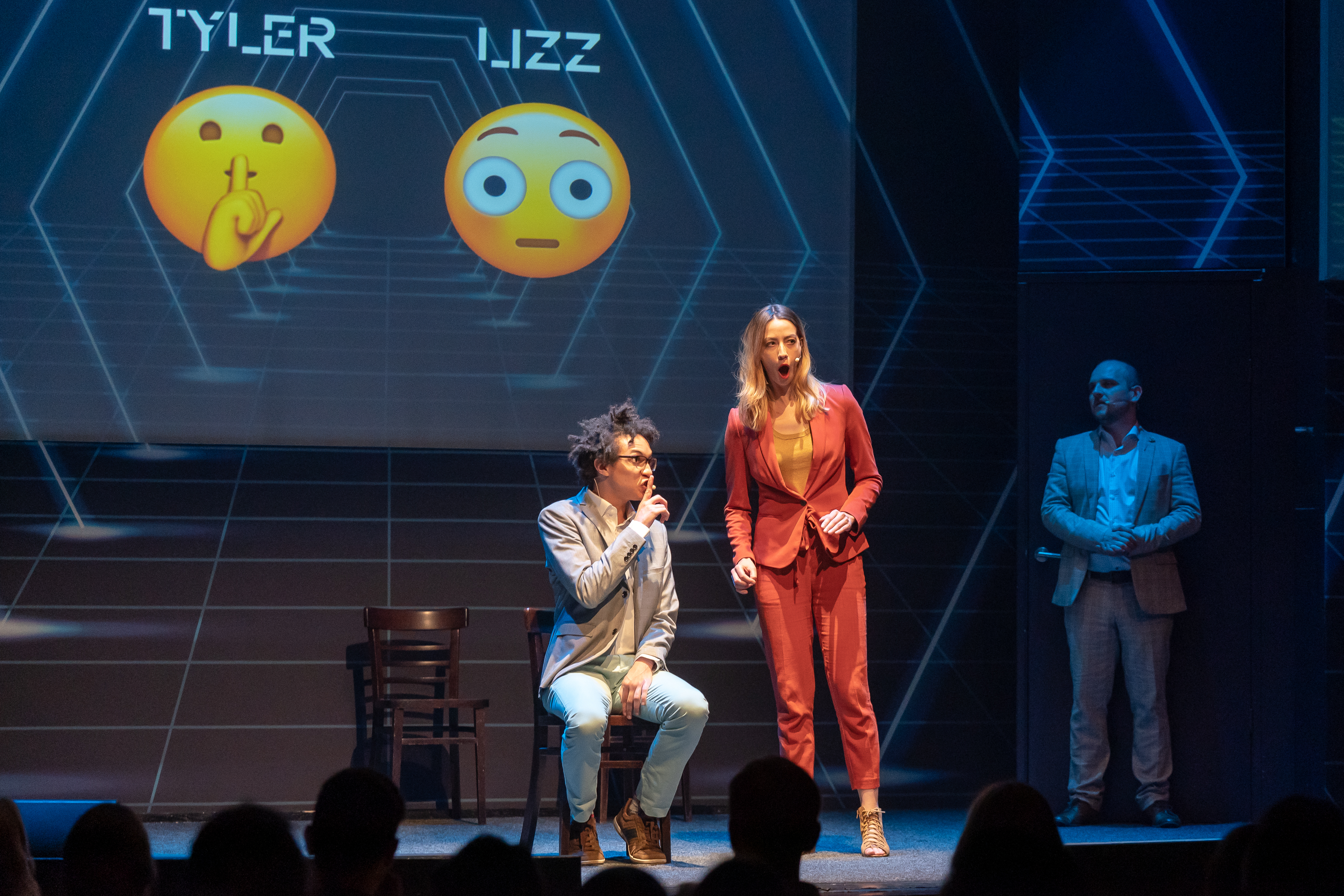
Tyler Groce and Lizz Biddy Kemery perform on stage at Boom Chicago in 2019

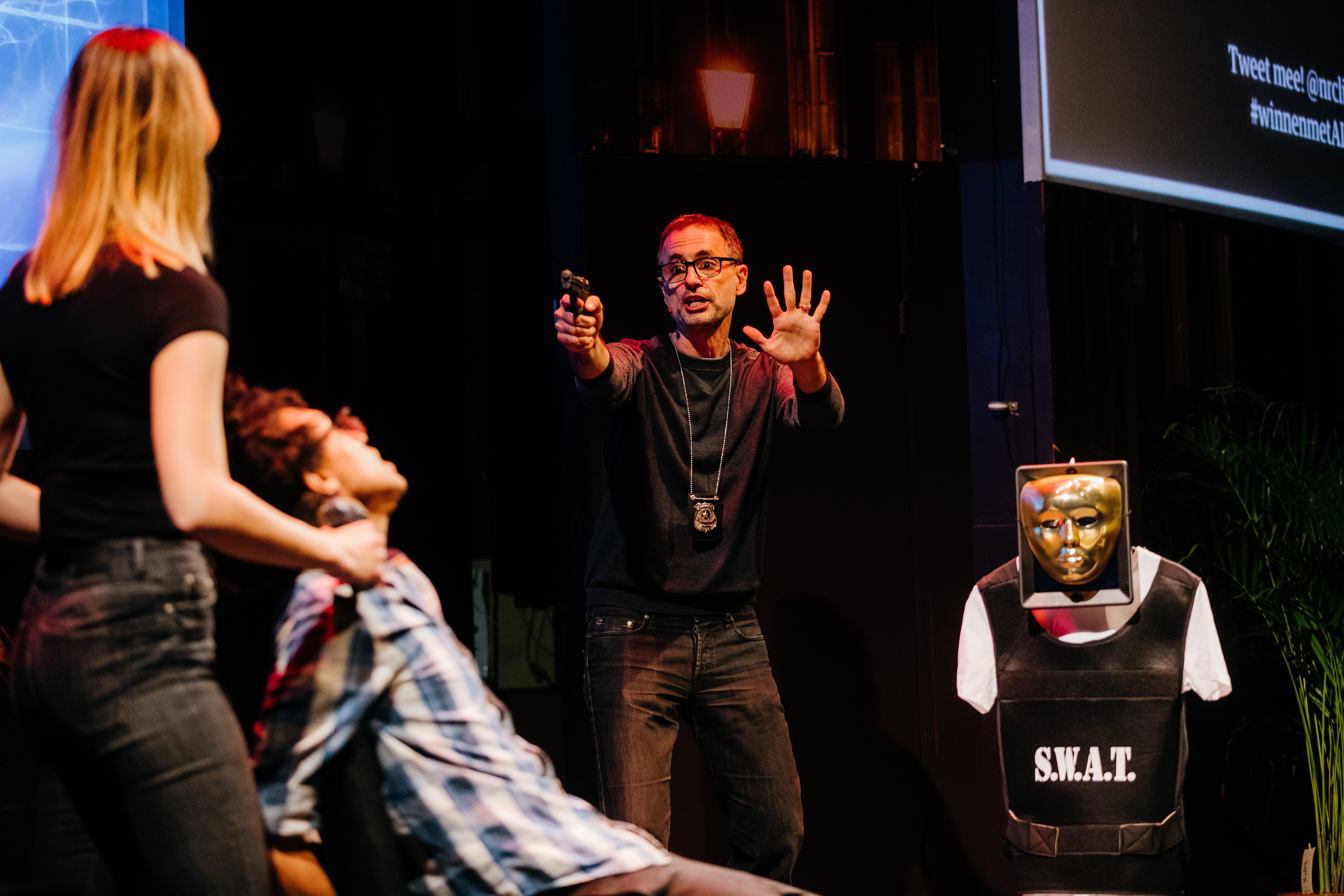
Andrew Moskos performs with the AI on stage in 2019

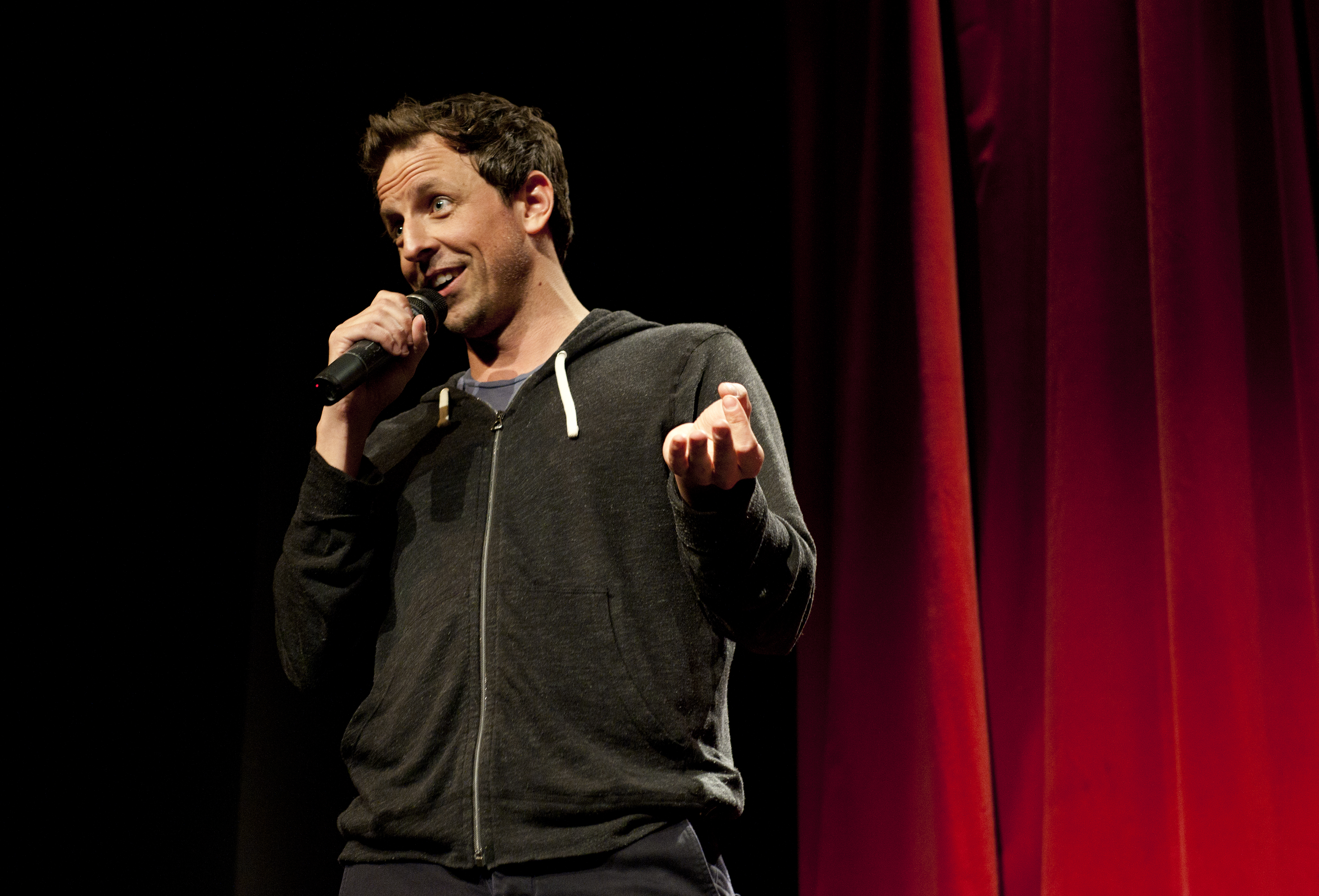
Boom Chicago alumnus Seth Meyers returns for stand up in 2013

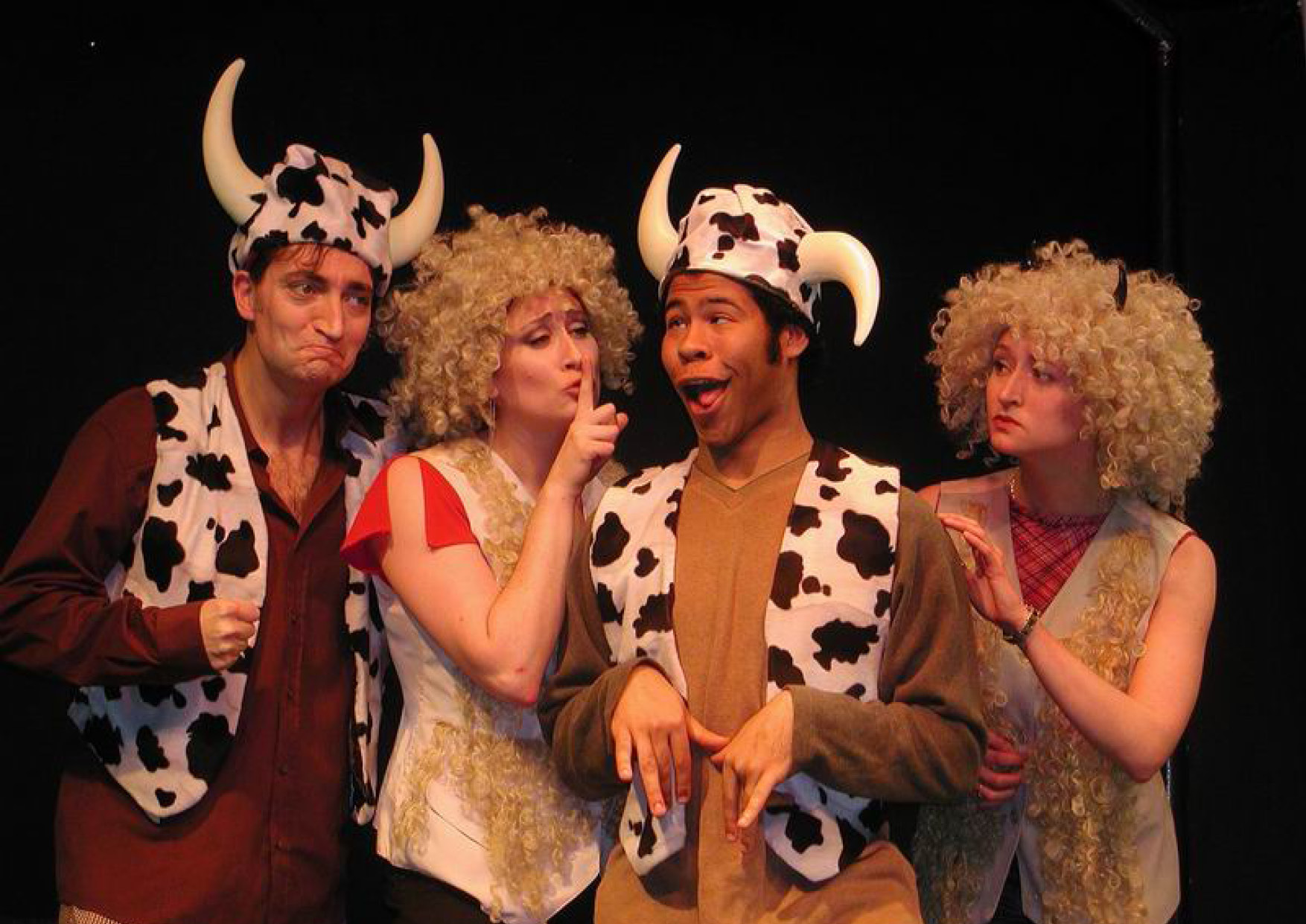
Jordan Peele (with Mad Cow Disease, center) with fellow cast members Pep Rosenfeld, Kristi Casey and Lauren Downden in 2001's Europe We've Created a Monster.

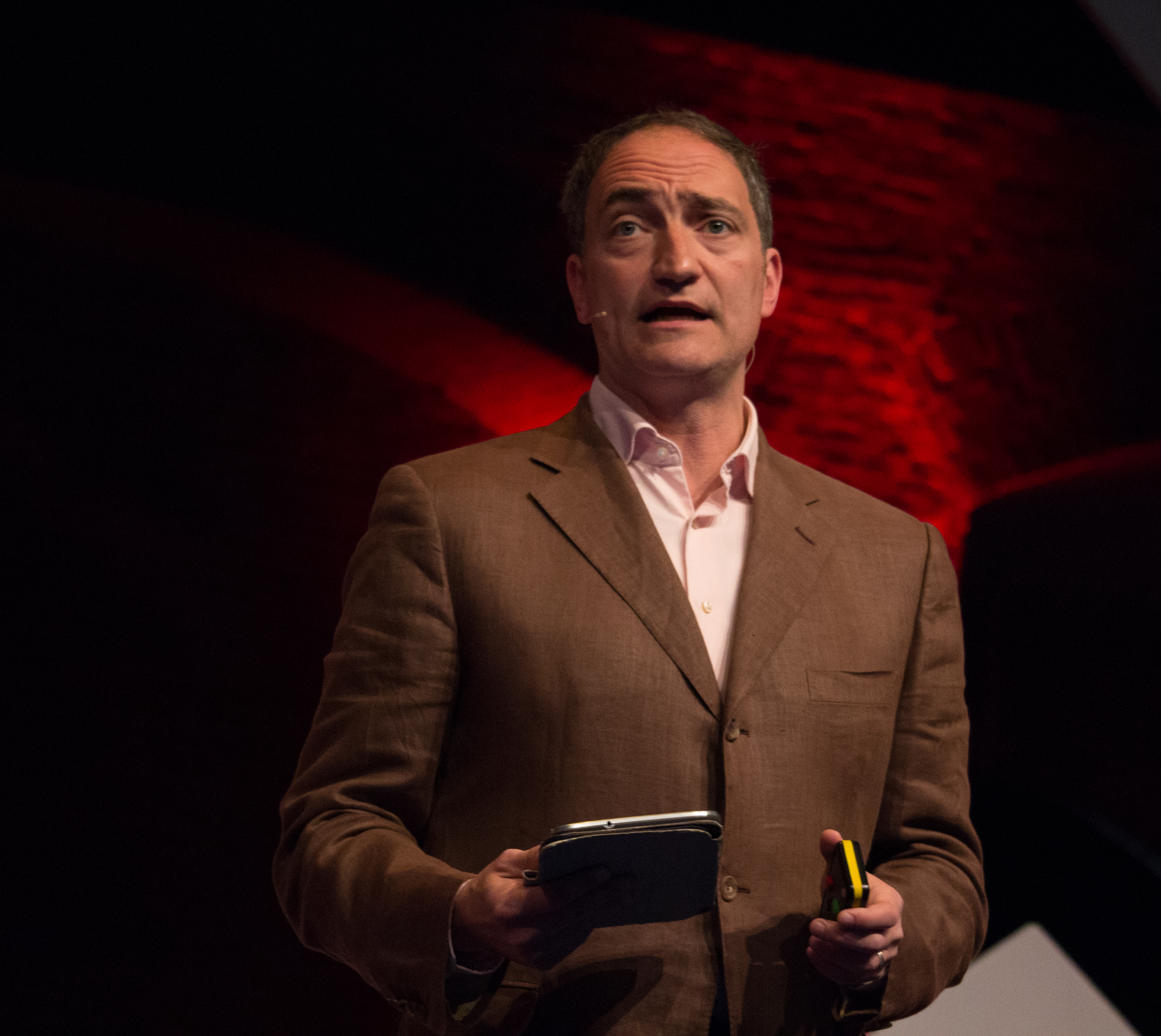
Pep Rosenfeld hosts The Next Web in 2015

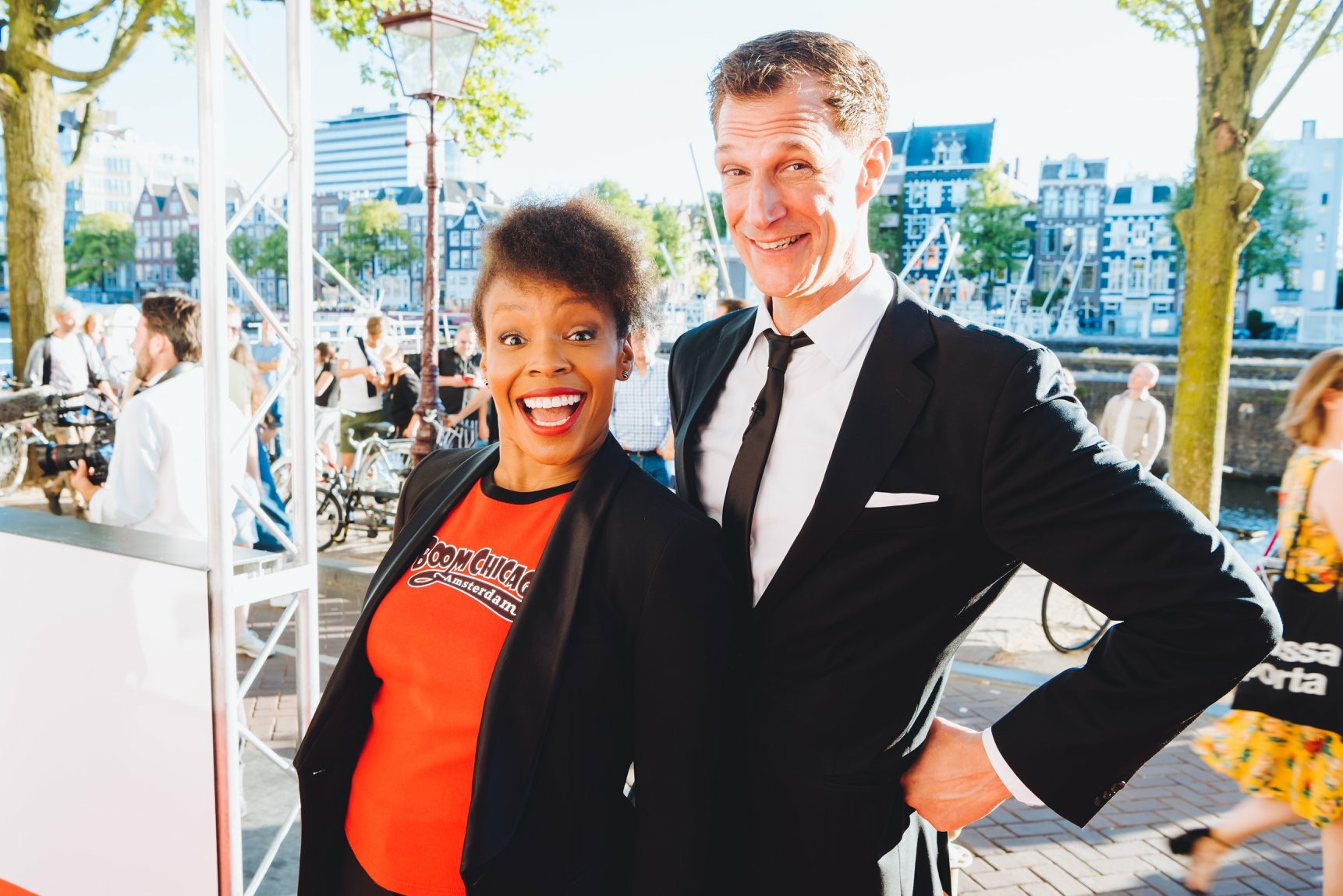
Amber Ruffin and Greg Shapiro at the Boom Chicago 25th Anniversary

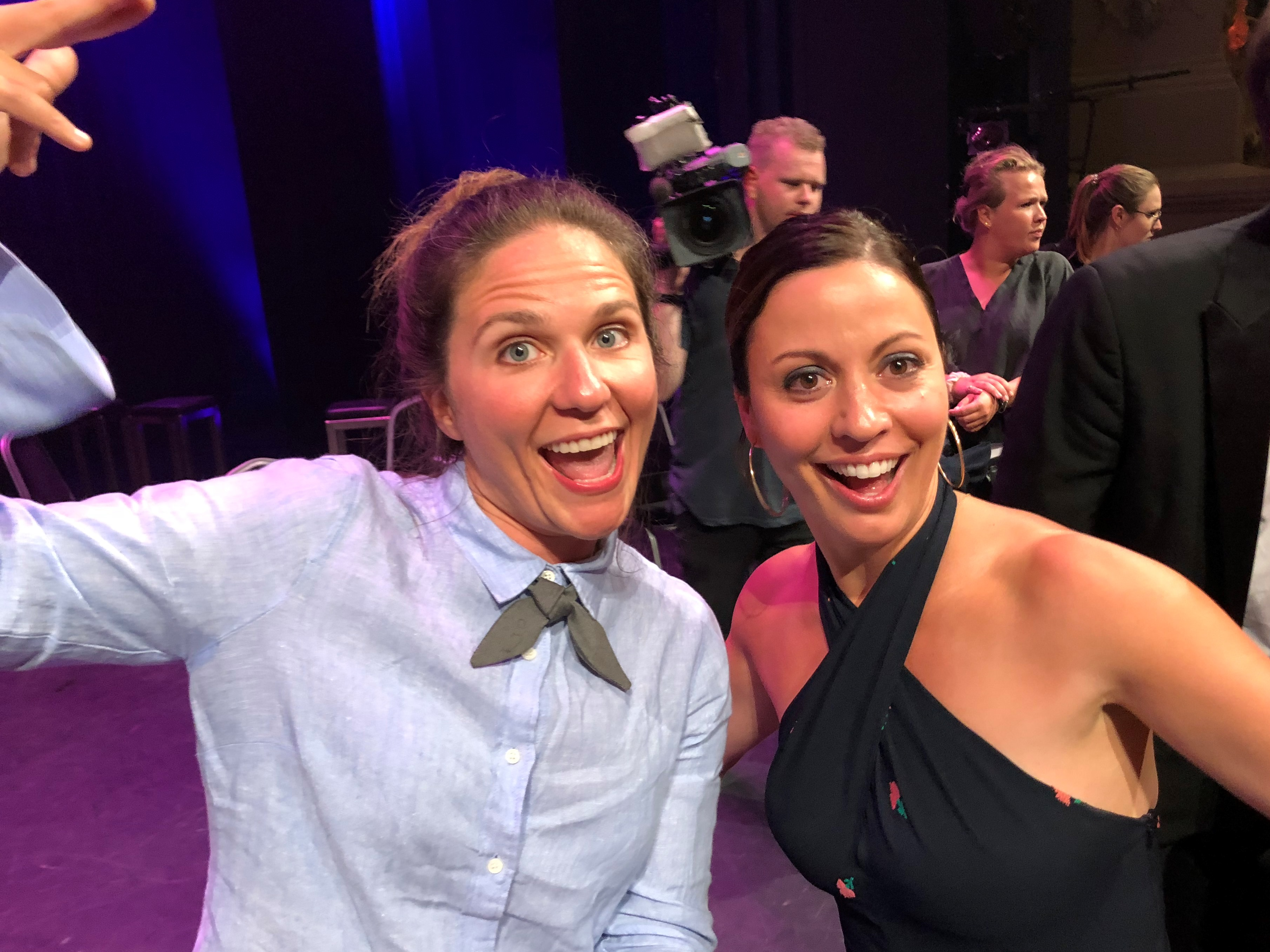
Alums Suzi Barrett and Kay Cannon at Boom Chicago's 25th Reunion

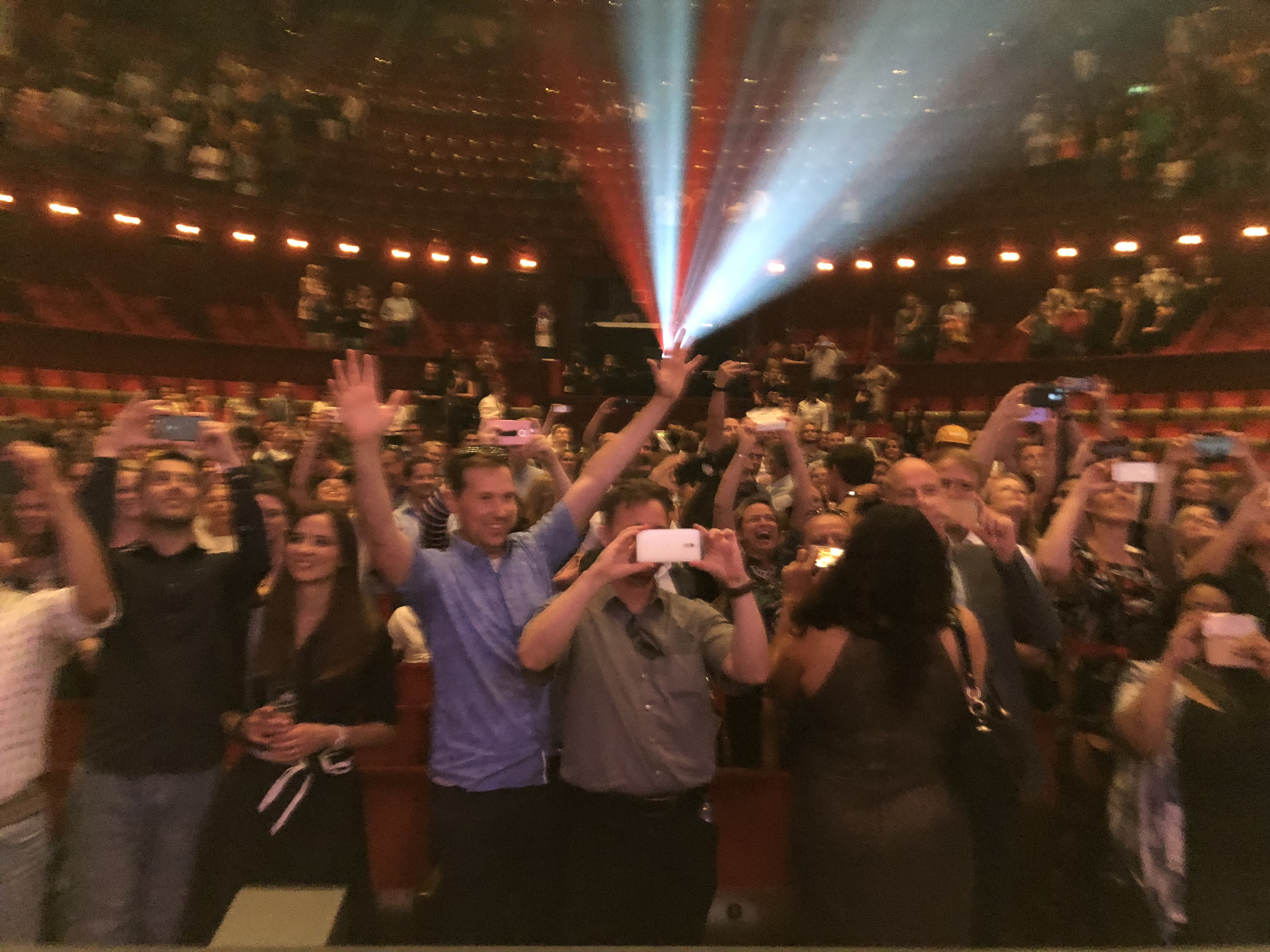
Boom Chicago's audience at the photo op after the (sold out) 25th reunion shows in Carre

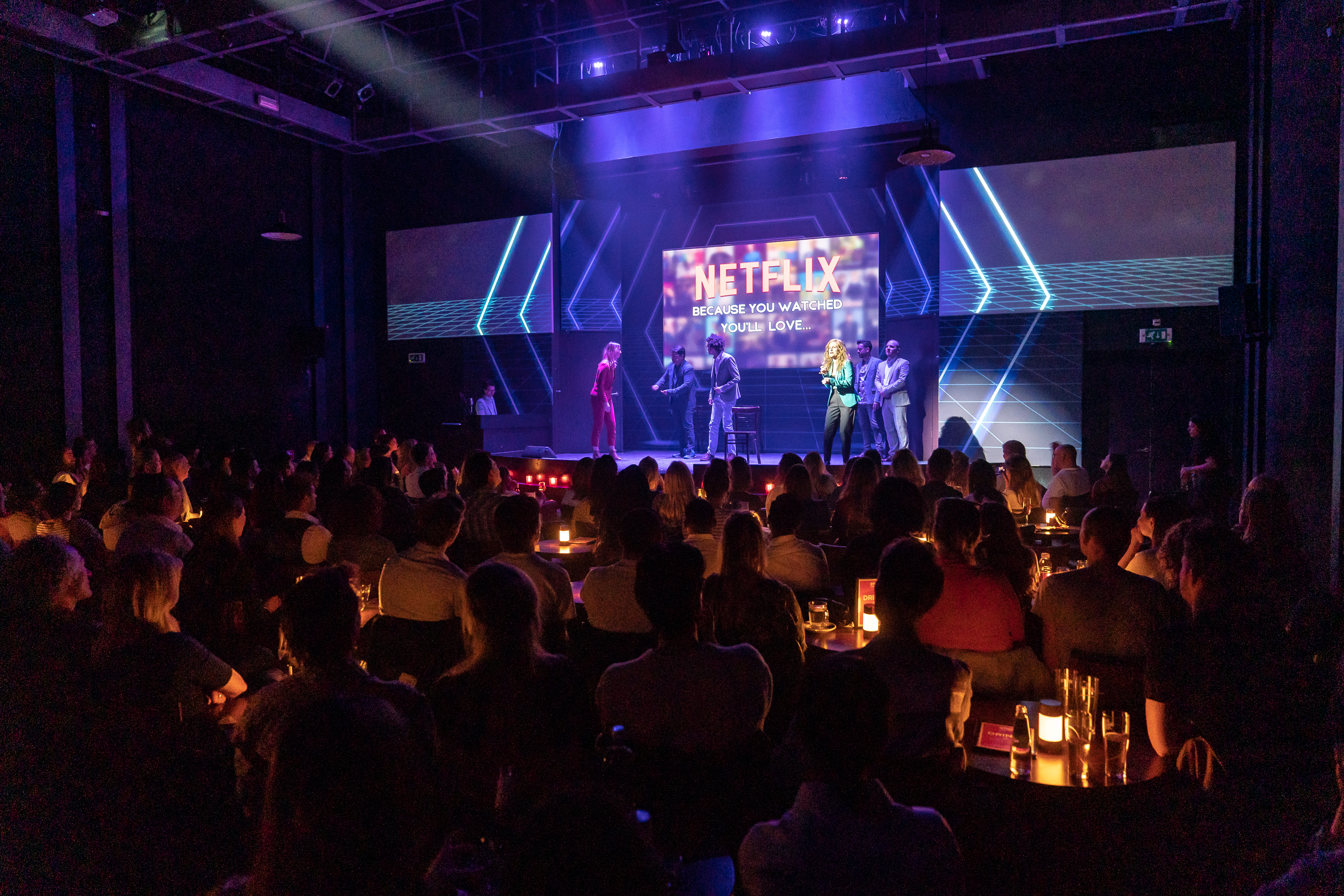
A moment from Boom Chicago's "The Future is Here...And it is Slightly Annoying"

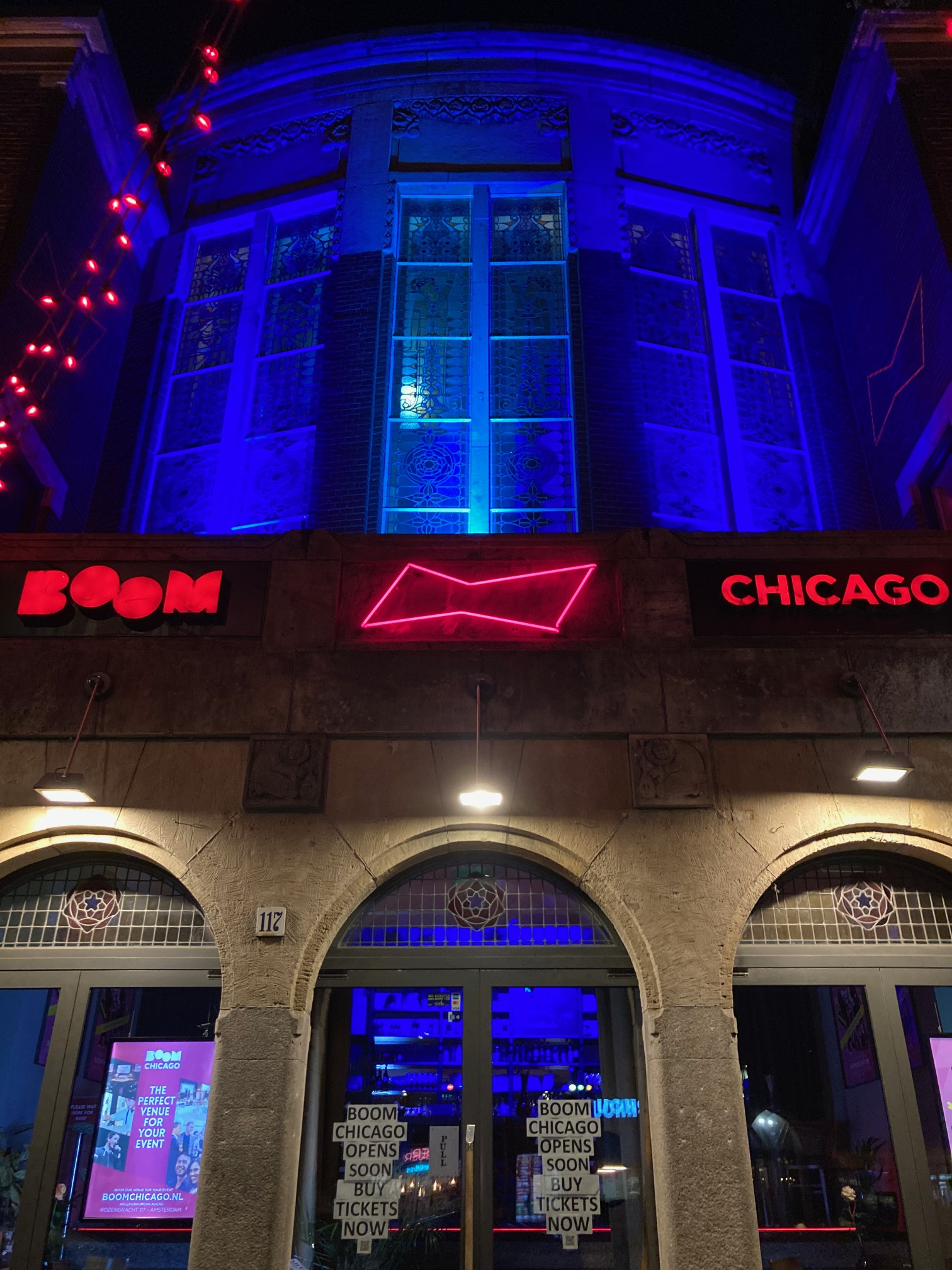
Boom Chicago's theater is lit up blue for the 2021 Global Autism Awareness Day

Boom Chicago is an international creative group based in Amsterdam, Netherlands, that writes and performs sketch and improvisational comedy at their theater on the Rozengracht.

The group performs their own shows and hosts visiting comedians at their venue on the Rozengracht. The complex with three theaters also houses Boom Chicago for Business, the Boom Chicago Academy and InterActing, their program for teenagers with autism.

Over their thirty plus year history, Boom Chicago has examined a range of subjects including privacy, the role of technology, creation of the EU, the extreme right, Dutch politician Pim Fortuyn, 9/11, social media, the gig economy, and AI.

Comedy Central News (CCN), a news show that ran on the Dutch Comedy Central TV channel, was created by Boom Chicago.

The company is owned by Saskia Maas, Andrew Moskos, and Pep Rosenfeld.

== History ==
1993: Andrew Moskos, Pep Rosenfeld and Ken Schaefle open Boom Chicago, naming it after their hometown. The first venue is at the Iboya, Korte Leidsedwarsstraat 41, with 85 seats. Saskia Maas joins the company.

1994: The group moves to the 180-seat Studio 100 (later the Sugar Factory, now called Lovelee) on Lijnbaansgracht 238.

1998: The group moves into the 270-seat Leidseplein Theater. Boom Chicago renovates the theater, adding a kitchen, bar, and rock show sound and lighting. Ken Schaefle leaves the group and Saskia Maas becomes CEO.

2000: Boom Chicago hires their first video director, Jamie Wright, and introduces multimedia to the shows. Cameras are fitted in the theater (and the Leidseplein outside) and green screen studios and live internet were introduced.

2002: Comedy Swap with The Second City in Chicago. The main stage casts of The Second City and Boom Chicago perform on each other's stages in each other's cities. This was the first (and only) time a visiting comedy group plays on Second City's mainstage. Keegan-Michael Key and Jordan Peele famously meet and would become Key and Peele.

2004: Boom Chicago Video Productions launches. Boom Chicago release the Florida Voting Machine Video, where an American citizen tries to vote for Kerry, but the rigged machine only allows him to vote for George Bush.

2006: The show Me, MySpace and iPod opens. In addition, Boom Chicago releases their first internet and mobile shows Full Frontal News (Greg Shapiro and Becky Nelson) and Slacker Fantasy Football (Michael Orton-Toliver, Brian Jack, Matt Chapman). The Unlikely Fan (Brendan Hunt, Matt Chapman), a daily video series about the FIFA World Cup, is featured on MSN.

2007: Comedy Central Netherlands launches "Comedy Central News" (75 episodes). "Highly Dubious News" shines at MIPCOM. "SpongeBob SquarePants in China" goes viral on YouTube (108 million views), sparking political controversy.

2008: 15 year anniversary, April 24. CCN returns as a weekly show in April on Comedy Central (NL).

2009: Yankee Come Back opens the City of Amsterdam's 400 Year celebration of the Dutch settlement of New York. During autumn, coinciding with New York's celebration, Holland Globetrotters plays the New Island Festival with cast Jordan Peele, Amber Ruffin, James Kirkland, Liz Bolton and Julie Nichols (music). With de Parade, Oerol and the Netherlands Theater Institute.

2010: Dutch pollster Maurice de Hond makes his on-stage comedy debut in Political Party. With Pep Rosenfeld, Greg Shapiro and director Andrew Moskos, the show combines politics, political discussion and A-list politicians who also perform in comedy scenes.

2011: The Leidseplein Theater becomes the Chicago Social Club. Together with Casper Reinders (Jimmy Woo) and Pieter de Koning and Joris Bakker (Bitterzoet) Boom Chicago upgrades and begins club programming.

2012: Pep Rosenfeld speaks at TEDx Amsterdam: "Fight, Flight or Be Funny" and hosts TEDx Binnenhof where he makes fun of Prince Willem-Alexander and Princess Maxima, who are in the audience. Saskia Maas speaks at TEDx Education.

2013: Boom Chicago moves from the Leidseplein to the Rozentheater, where they celebrate 20 years in Amsterdam with a show, The 7 Deadly Dutch Sins. The Chicago Social Club continues at Leidseplein.

2013: Nightmare on the Rozengracht runs during October, a 30-minute walk-through haunted house and pop up bar for adults.

2014: To promote What's Up With Those Beards?, Boom Chicago attempts to break the Guinness Book of World Records for most beards in one room. They only break the Dutch record.

2016: For the first ever Dutch Correspondents' Dinner, Andrew Moskos and Wilko Terwijn (and the RVD) write the comedy speech for and coach Prime Minister Mark Rutte. Pep Rosenfeld and Greg Shapiro performs Angry White Men: Trump Up the Volume.

2017: Trump Up the Volume becomes the longest running show at Boom Chicago. Boom Chicago renovates and launches the Upstairs Theater, the best room for comedy in Amsterdam. Sunday Night Live take residency. Long form improv returns to Boom Chicago. Pep Rosenfeld, Greg Shapiro, and director Andrew Moskos present The Year in Search, a video in partnership with Google.

2018: Andrew Moskos takes over as artistic director. The 25th anniversary show Bango! opens in May, starring Tamar Broadbent, Karel Ebergen, Simon Lukacs, Rhys Collier, Cene Hale, Emil Struijker-Boudier, Sacha Hoedemaker and directed by Andrew Moskos.

2018 The 25th anniversary year peaks on July 14 with two shows at Carré and the release of their book, The 25 Most Important Years in Dutch History. The Boom Chicago Academy begins teaching improvisation to the next generation. Escape Through the Movies, an escape room experience, opens at the Rozentheater. Saskia Maas launches InterActing, Boom Chicago's program for teenagers with autism.

2019: Boom Chicago performs The Future is Here ...And it's Slightly Annoying!. The show includes programming a robot to improvise with the cast onstage using machine learning. Boom Chicago partners with AB InBev to be a launch location for Budweiser in the Netherlands.

2020 Pandemic: Boom Chicago produces six episodes of live comedy shows (Trump up the Volume and Going Steady). It raises more than €10.000 in ticket sales for the actors and crew. Later in June, Boom Chicago plays outdoors at live festival HEMtuin. Boom Chicago also expands into digital corporate shows.

2021: Boom Chicago creates and launches a new curriculum for The Boom Chicago Academy and launches house teams.

2021: The first Boom Chicago Comedy Festival launches. Alumni Seth Meyers, Jordan Peele, Kay Cannon, Colton Dunn, Josh Meyers, Ike Barinholtz and Brendan Hunt give live Q&A interviews. Arjen Lubach reunites with his old improv group Op Sterk Water. They and Shantira Jackson & Stacey Smith win the first two Bud Kings of Comedy Prizes for best festival shows.

2022: After shooting a week in Amsterdam with Ted Lasso (including playing against Ajax), Jason Sudeikis and Brendan Hunt retake the Boom stage at the Shot of Improv and closing night party.

2022: Stacey Smith takes over as artistic director.

2022: Pep Rosenfeld and Greg Shapiro are joined by Stacey Smith, Emil Struijker-Boudier and Sacha Hoedemaker to create a show called Pep & Greg Save America.

2023: Boom Chicago's 30th anniversary festival drops, including multiple performances at the Tuschinksi by Seth Meyers and Brendan Hunt. Brendan remounted his 2006 hit Five Years in Amsterdam and also performed the world premiere of The Movement You Need. Other performers included Amber Ruffin, Heather Anne Campbell, Arjen Lubach, Ruben van der Meer, year one cast member Neil McNamara, and Mayor Femke Halsema.

2023: In America, Akashic Books published Boom Chicago Presents The Thirty Most Important Years in Dutch History, an oral history of the comedy club. The New York Times does a feature.

2024: Andrew Moskos returns as Artistic Director. Boom Chicago takes over Comedy Embassy and begins programming late night stand-up comedy on Fridays. A year later they added a second show on Saturday nights. More visiting comedians play Boom Chicago when their careers are on their way up (or down).

2025: Pep Rosenfeld writes Work/Laugh Balance which is published in English and Dutch versions. (by A.W. Bruna).

2025 Boom Chicago x Pro Wrestling Holland collab combines top professional wrestling and comedy. Gone Country, a country line dancing night starts in Amsterdam and spreads to many Dutch cities. Shot of Improv gets revamped and moves to Wednesdays.

2025: Boom Chicago creates and performs Boom Boom Boom Boom Chicago about Harder Styles at Defqon 1, one of the biggest festivals of the Netherlands. Boom performs 15 shows in a custom-built theater

2026: 60 Minutes, the American news magazine, researches and creates an in-depth piece about Boom Chicago.

2026: Brad Kemp takes over as Artistic Director and Music Director. He directs his first show, Sweet Home Amsterdamma.

== Notable alumni ==
Seth Meyers (Late Night with Seth Meyers, Saturday Night Live) was a member of Boom Chicago in the late 1990s. He wrote, directed and starred in Boom productions in Amsterdam, Chicago, London, Singapore and Edinburgh.

Oscar winner Jordan Peele created many shows at Boom Chicago in Amsterdam and at the Edinburgh Fringe Festival. Keegan-Michael Key met Peele in 2002 at the Boom Chicago-Second City stage swap.

Ted Lasso was created by three Boom Chicago alumni: Jason Sudeikis, Brendan Hunt and Joe Kelly. They created, wrote, starred in, and directed the series. Their new Ted Lasso series begins in 2026-7.

Amber Ruffin is a writer/performer for Late Night with Seth Meyers and hostedThe Amber Ruffin Show). She is also a writer-performer on the American version of Have I Got News For you. In addition to her TV fame, Amber wrote two books on race in America.

Ike Barinholtz stars in, writes and produces movies and TV shows. Recently he starred in The Studio, with Seth Rogan which was nominated and won many awards. Ike himself won the Critics Choice Award for his role in 2026. Other productions include Running Point, History of the World, Part II, Mindy Project, Suicide Squad, and Bad Neighbors. He also won the Celebrity Jeopardy championship in 2023, and donated his million dollar prize to his charity.

Kay Cannon wrote for many film and TV shows, including the Pitch Perfect films. She directed a Boom-filled cast in Blockers and wrote and directed a re-imagining of Cinderella for Sony in 2021.

Tami Sagher was a writer-producer for Orange is the New Black. She also writes and stars in TV shows like Inside Amy Schumer, 30 Rock, Broad City, and the (improv) film Don't Think Twice. She was a writer-executive producer on the Hulu series Shrill.

Colton Dunn (Widow's Bay on Apple TV+) starred in the NBC sitcom Superstore during its six-year run. He wrote many scenes on Key & Peele. He was also the chauffeur in Blockers.

Heather Anne Campbell, is an executive producer and writer for Rick and Morty, creating many of their most iconic episodes. Earlier she wrote for Saturday Night Live and was a cast member of Whose Line is it Anyway? She has appeared any many other TV shows and is one of the hosts of the podcast Get Played!

Josh Meyers is co-creator of the Family Trips with the Meyers Brothers podcast. He plays Governor Gavin Newsom on The Jimmy Kimmel Show. and is the face and host of Visit California. Earlier he starred with Paul Rubens on Broadway in Pee Wee's Playhouse and in the accompanying HBO special.

Other alumni include Dan Oster (MADtv), Liz Cackowski (SNL), Allison Silverman (Daily Show, Colbert Report), Pete Grosz, Matt Jones (Breaking Bad), Suzi Barrett (Drunk History), Jessica Lowe (Wrecked), E.R. Fightmaster (Grey's Anatomy), Ally Beardsley (Dimension 20 and Game Changer) and Carl Tart (MadTV, Party Over Here, and Brooklyn Nine-Nine).

The British mockumentary Borderline was created by Mike Orton-Toliver, and directed by Matt Jones. Greg Shapiro was Boom Chicago's anchorman on CCN, Comedy Central News (Netherlands) and played Donald Trump in the video America First, The Netherlands Second.

On Broadway, Pete Grosz performed in Good Night, Oscar. (2022-3) Nicole Parker starred with Martin Short in Fame Becomes Me in 2009 and in Wicked in 2010. Tarik Davis performed in Freestyle Love Supreme from 2019 to 2022 (As well as on The Amber Ruffin Show). Spencer Kayden co-created and starred in Urinetown in the 1990s and was nominated for a 2012 Tony award in Don't Dress for Dinner. In 2006–2007, Lisa Jolley appeared in Hairspray.

Off Broadway: Amber Ruffin and music director David Schmoll created the musical Bigfoot (2026)

== Current Ensemble ==
- Meg Buzza
- Simon Feilder
- Simon Lukacs
- Deshawn Mason
- Laura Maynard (and Boom Chicago Academy Director)
- Katie Nixon
- Rob Andrist-Plourde
- Michael Diederich
- Brad Kemp (Artistic and Music Director)
- Emil Struijker-Boudier (technician)
- Jeiel Graanoogst (tech director)
- Andrew Moskos (Artistic Director/co-owner)
- Pep Rosenfeld (director of creative content/co-owner)
- Saskia Maas (CEO and co-owner)

== Productions ==
1993 Andrew Moskos, Pep Rosenfeld, Neil McNamara, Lindley Curry, Miriam Tolan, Pam Gutteridge, Doreen Calderon + Ken Schaefle

1994 Boom / Chicago Andrew Moskos, Pep Rosenfeld, Pam Gutteridge, Emilie Beck, Josie O'Reilly, Greg Shore (Shapiro) + Ken Schaefle

1995 Great Moments in Creation/Culture Shock Therapy Andrew Moskos, Pep Rosenfeld, Pam Gutteridge, Greg Shore (Shapiro), Lillian Frances (née Hubscher), Tami Sagher, Scott Jones, Lesley Bevan, Sue Gillan (née Gillan) + Ken Schaefle

1996 Boom Chicago's Laatste Nieuws / Best of Boom Andrew Moskos, Pep Rosenfeld, Greg Shore (Shapiro), Rob AndristPlourde, Jason Meyer, Karin McKie, Lesley Bevan, Sue Gillan, Jeremy Hornik, Spencer Kayden, + Ken Schaefle + Shane Oman, + Gary Shepard, + Michael Diederich

1997 boomchicago.nl: the internet and other modern frustrations Andrew Moskos, Pep Rosenfeld, Greg Shore (Shapiro), Rob AndristPlourde, Pete Grosz, Seth Meyers, Phill Arensberg, Allison Silverman, Gwendolyn Druyor, Lisa Jolley, Josie O'Reilly + Ken Schaefle

1998 Think Quick Andrew Moskos, Pep Rosenfeld, Greg Shapiro-Shore, Rob AndristPlourde, Seth Meyers, Jill Benjamin, Holly Walker, John Stoops, Jethro Nolen, Sue Peale, Josh Meyers, Kristy Entwistle Nolen, Josie O'Reilly, + Jon Schickedanz + Steven Svymbersky

1999 Pick-ups & Hiccups Seth Meyers, Jill Benjamin

1999 Everything's Going to Be All Right—and Other Lies Andrew Moskos, Greg Shore-Shapiro, Rob AndristPlourde, Holly Walker, Josh Meyers, Brendan Hunt, Ike Barinholtz, Joe Canale, Juliet Curry, Jethro Nolen, Kristy Entwistle Nolen, Dave Asher, Liz Cackowski, + Ron West, + Josie O'Reilly, + Gerbrand van Kolck + Steven Svymbersky

1999 Two Thousand Years Down the Drain: From Jesus Christ to Jerry Springer Andrew Moskos, Greg Shore-Shapiro, Rob AndristPlourde, Holly Walker, Josh Meyers, Brendan Hunt, Ike Barinholtz, Joe Canale, Juliet Curry, Jethro Nolen, Kristy Entwistle Nolen, Dave Asher, Liz Cackowski, + Ron West, + Josie O'Reilly, + Jon Schickedanz + Steven Svymbersky

2000 Live at the Leidseplein: Your Privacy Is Our Business (Boom Chicago is Watching Edinburgh Production) Andrew Moskos, Greg Shapiro, Rob AndristPlourde, Dave Asher, Holly Walker, Josh Meyers, Brendan Hunt, Ike Barinholtz, Liz Cackowski, Jason Sudeikis, Kay Cannon, Bumper Caroll, Jennifer Bills, David Buckman, + Dave Razowsky + Jamie Wright, + Gerbrand van Kolck + Steven Svymbersky

2001 Europe: We've Created a Monster Greg Shapiro, Rob AndristPlourde, Rachel Miller, Holly Walker, Josh Meyers, Brendan Hunt, Dave Asher, Lauren Dowden, Nicole Parker, Jordan Peele, Becky Drysdale, Joe Kelly, + Ron West, + Andrew Moskos, + Dave Buckman, + Jamie Wright, + Gerbrand van Kolck + Steven Svymbersky

2001 Ironic Yanks Seth Meyers, Brendan Hunt, + Andrew Moskos

2001 Nieuwjaarsconference Pep Rosenfeld, Greg Shapiro, + Gerbrand van Kolck + Steven Svymbersky

2002 Rock Stars Greg Shapiro, Rob AndristPlourde, Rachel Miller, Randall Harr, Kristi Casey, Joe Kelly, Dani Sher, Colton Dunn, Brendan Hunt, Melody Nife, Lauren Dowden, Nicole Parker, Jordan Peele, + Dave Razowsky + Pep Rosenfeld, + Andrew Moskos, + Jamie Wright, + Gerbrand van Kolck + Steven Svymbersky + Rebecca Hone

2002 Here Comes the Neighborhood (Edinburgh Production) Brendan Hunt, Jordan Peele, + Joe Kelly, + Andrew Moskos

2002 Yankee Go Home: Americans and Why You Love to Hate Us Pep Rosenfeld, Greg Shapiro, + Andrew Moskos, + Gerbrand van Kolck + Rebecca Hone

2003 Boom Chicago Saves the World (Sorry about the Mess) Greg Shapiro, Rob AndristPlourde, Brendan Hunt, Jordan Peele, Colton Dunn, Dani Sher, Rachel Miller, Suzi Barrett, Heather Campbell, Jim Woods, + Pep Rosenfeld, + Andrew Moskos, + Jamie Wright, + Gerbrand van Kolck + Steven Svymbersky

2003 Going Down: A Comedy Show About Pessimism Pep Rosenfeld, Greg Shapiro, + Andrew Moskos, + Jamie Wright, + David Schmoll

2004 Why Aren't You Happy Yet? Greg Shapiro, Rob AndristPlourde, Rachel Miller, Suzi Barrett, Heather Campbell, Jim Woods, Tim Sniffen, Ryan Archibald, Tarik Davis, Amber Ruffin, + Pep Rosenfeld, + Andrew Moskos, + Jamie Wright, + David Schmoll, + Steven Svymbersky

2004 Mr. America Contest: A Comedy Show about the U.S. Presidential Race Pep Rosenfeld, Greg Shapiro, Andrew Moskos, Jamie Wright, David Schmoll

2005 Bite the Bullet! Suzi Barrett, Heather Campbell, Tarik Davis, Matt Jones, Amber Ruffin, Tim Sniffen, Jim Woods, + Andrew Moskos, + Pep Rosenfeld, + Greg Shapiro, + Rob AndristPlourde, + Rachel Miller, + Jamie Wright, + David Schmoll, + Steven Svymbersky

2005 Best of Boom 2005 Ryan Archibald, Suzi Barrett, Heather Campbell, Tarik Davis, Matt Jones, Tim Sniffen, Jim Woods, + Andrew Moskos, + Pep Rosenfeld, + Greg Shapiro, + Rob AndristPlourde, + Rachel Miller, + Amber Ruffin, + Jamie Wright, + David Schmoll, + Steven Svymbersky

2006 Best of Boom 2006 Rob AndristPlourde, Hilary Bauman, Tarik Davis, Lauren Flans, Ryan Gowland, Brian Jack, Matt Jones, Dan Oster, Greg Shapiro, + Andrew Moskos, + Pep Rosenfeld, + Laurel Coppock, + David Schmoll, + Vladimir Berkhemer + Steven Svymbersky

2006 Kick This: A World Cup Comedy with Balls Pep Rosenfeld, Brendan Hunt, Andrew Moskos, Jamie Wright, David Schmoll

2006 Me MySpace and iPod Hilary Bauman, Lauren Flans, Brian Jack, Matt Jones, Dan Oster + Andrew Moskos + Pep Rosenfeld + Mike Orton-Toliver, + Rob AndristPlourde, + Jennifer Burton, + Michael Diederich, + Gregory Shapiro, + Steven Svymbersky + Dave Schmoll, + Vladimir Berkhemer, + Matt Chapman, + Becky Nelson

2007 Boom Chicago's Wild West Comedy and Gun Show—Featuring One Real Indian Jennifer Burton, Lauren Flans, Mike Orton-Toliver, Jim Woods, Joe Kelly + Pep Rosenfeld + Andrew Moskos + Rob AndristPlourde, + Suzi Barrett, + Hilary Bauman, + Brian Jack + Michael Diederich, + Dan Oster + Gregory Shapiro, + Steven Svymbersky + Dave Schmoll, + Vladimir Berkhemer, + Matt Chapman, + Becky Nelson

2007 Five Years in Amsterdam (Edinburgh Production) Brendan Hunt + Andrew Moskos

2008 Last One to Leave the Planet, Turn Out the Lights Ryan Archibald, Hilary Bauman, Lauren Flans, James Kirkland, Mike Orton-Toliver, Pep Rosenfeld, David Schmoll, Steven Svymbersky, Ash Lim + Andrew Moskos, + Rob AndristPlourde, + Lolu Ajayi, + Michael Diederich, + Hans Holsen, + Gregory Shapiro, + Andel Sudik, + Julie Nichols, + Neil Towsey, + Brendan Hunt, + Matt Chapman, + Becky Nelson

2008 Screw the Planet; Save the Oil (Best of Boom 2009) Lolu Ajayi, Ryan Archibald, Liz Bolton, Amber Ruffin, Dave Schmoll, Steven Svymbersky, Pep Rosenfeld, Shane Oman, + Andrew Moskos, + Rob AndristPlourde, + Michael Diederich, +Hans Holsen, + James Kirkland, + Mike Orton-Toliver, + Andel Sudik, + Julie Nichols, + Brian Tjon Ajong, + Neil Townsey, + Matt Chapman, + Becky Nelson

2008 Bye-Bye Bush Pep Rosenfeld, Gregory Shapiro, Mike Orton-Toliver, Andrew Moskos, Steven Svymbersky, Julie Nichols + Matt Chapman, + Becky Nelson

2009 Yankee Come Back Hans Holsen, Liz Bolton, Amber Ruffin, James Kirkland, Mike Orton-Toliver, Julie Nichols, Brian Tjon Ajong, Neil Townsey, Pep Rosenfeld, Shane Oman, + Andrew Moskos + Lolu Ajayi, + Rob AndristPlourde, + Michael Diederich, + Andel Sudick, + Dave Schmoll, + Steven Svymbersky, + Matt Chapman

2009 Holland Globetrotters (New York Production) Liz Bolton, James Kirkland, Amber Ruffin, Jordan Peele, Julie Nichols, Pep Rosenfeld, Andrew Moskos, Steven Svymbersky

2009 Upgrade or Die! Rob AndristPlourde, Liz Bolton, Amber Ruffin, James Kirkland, Brian Tjon Ajong, Neil Townsey, Dave Schmoll, Pep Rosenfeld, Shane Oman, + Andrew Moskos + Lolu Ajayi, + Michael Diederich, + Matt Chapman, + Jessica Lowe, + Steven Svymbersky

2010 Political Party Maurice de Hond, Pep Rosenfeld, Greg Shapiro + Andrew Moskos + Brian Tjon Ajong

2010 Your Worst Fears Lolu Ajayi, Amber Ruffin, Pep Rosenfeld, Dave Schmoll + Rob AndristPlourde, Michael Diederich + Jessica Lowe + Matt Chapman + Brian Tjon Ajong, + Shane Oman, + Andrew Moskos + Steven Svymbersky

2010 There's No Such Thing as Sinterklaas Pep Rosenfeld, Greg Shapiro, Andrew Moskos + Brian Tjon Ajong + James Winder + Steven Svymbersky + Dave Schmoll

2011 Social Media Circus Lolu Ajayi, Amber Ruffin, Jessica Lowe, Matt Chapman, Jim Woods, Pep Rosenfeld, Andrew Moskos, Dave Schmoll + Rob AndristPlourde, + Haley Mancini + Mike Orton-Toliver + Michael Diederich + Brian Tjon Ajong, + Shane Oman, + Steven Svymbersky

2011 9/11 Forever Pep Rosenfeld, Greg Shapiro, Mike Orton-Toliver, Andrew Moskos + Brian Tjon Ajong + James Winder + Dave Schmoll

2012 Branded for Life Lolu Ajayi, Cari Leslie, Drew DiFonzo Marks, Mike Orton-Toliver, Jim Woods, Pep Rosenfeld, Andrew Moskos, Dave Schmoll + Rob AndristPlourde, + Laura Chinn + Michael Diederich + Marcy Minton + Sam Super + Brian Tjon Ajong, + Shane Oman, + James Winder, + Steven Svymbersky

2012 My Big Fat American Election Mike Orton-Toliver, Pep Rosenfeld, Greg Shapiro + Andrew Moskos, + Dave Schmoll

2012 Deep Undercover Andrew Moskos, Mike Orton-Toliver, Pep Rosenfeld, + Michael Diederich, + Ellie Orton-Toliver + Finn Moskos + Sam Super plus other actors and citizens of Amsterdam

2013 Baby I Like It Raw Lolu Ajayi, Cari Leslie, Jim Woods, Rob AndristPlourde, Michael Diederich, Sam Super + Pep Rosenfeld + Andrew Moskos + Dave Schmoll + Brian Tjon Ajong + Steven Svymbersky

2013 Seven Deadly Dutch Sins Lolu Ajayi, Jim Woods, Pep Rosenfeld, Andrew Moskos + Michael Diederich + Cari Leslie + Sam Super + Brian Tjon Ajong + Steven Svymbersky

2013 20th Anniversary Best of Boom Lolu Ajayi, Ryan Archibald, Rob AndristPlourde, Suzi Barrett, Heather Campbell, Horace Cohen, Michael Diederich, Becky Drysdale, James Kirkland, Brendan Hunt, Matt Jones, Cari Leslie, Ruben van der Meer, Andrew Moskos, Haley Mancini, Pep Rosenfeld, David Schmoll, Greg Shapiro, Sam Super, Neil Towsey, Brian Tjong Ajong, Jim Woods + Sasha Hoedemaker + Joe Kelly + Gerbrand van Kolck + Becky Nelson + Jamie Wright

2013 Nightmare on the Rozengracht (haunted house)

2013 Delete Zwarte Piet Niet Pep Rosenfeld, Greg Shapiro, Andrew Moskos + Lolu Ajayi + Brian Tjon Ajong + Steven Svymbersky

2014 What's Up with Those Beards? Lolu Ajayi, Ally Beardsley, Sam Super, Carl Tart, Jim Woods, + Pep Rosenfeld, + Andrew Moskos + Brian Tjon Ajong + Steven Svymbersky + Rob AndristPlourde + Michael Diederich + Eleanor Hollingsworth + David Schmoll

2014 Freak Circus (haunted house)

2015 New Kids on the Gracht Lolu Ajayi, Ally Beardsley, E.R.(Emily) Fightmaster, Woody Fu, Sacha Hoedemaker, Ian Owens, Sue Gillan, Piero Procaccini, + Greg Mills, + Andrew Moskos, + Pep Rosenfeld + Brian Tjon Ajong + Steven Svymbersky

2015 Rob it Like it's Hot Rob AndristPlourde, Michael Diederich, + Brian Tjon Ajong

2015 Escape Through Time (Escape adventure) Andrew Moskos, Pep Rosenfeld + Rob AndristPlourde + Bobby Makariev + Finn Moskos + Isaac Simon + Tanne van der Waal + Rixt Weer

2016 Haunted Warehouse (haunted house at Roest)

2016 VR Winter Wonderland Lolu Ajayi, Karel Ebergen, Cene Hale, Josh Rachford, Else Soelling + Jim Woods + Brian Tjon Ajong + Sacha Hoedemaker + Emil Struijker-Boudier

2016 Angry White Men: Trump Up the Volume Pep Rosenfeld, Greg Shapiro, Andrew Moskos + Brian Tjon Ajong

2017 Facetime Your Fears Karel Ebergen, Cene Hale, Ace Manning, Josh Rachford, Else Soelling, Jim Woods + Pep Rosenfeld, + Brian Tjon Ajong + Sacha Hoedemaker + Emil Struijker-Boudier

2017 Legends of Rob Rob AndristPlourde, Michael Diederich, + Emil Struijker-Boudier + Sacha Hoedemaker

2017 Sunday Night Live Karel Ebergen, Cene Hale, Ace Manning, Josh Rachford, Else Soelling, Jim Woods + Brian Tjon Ajong + Sacha Hoedemaker + Emil Struijker-Boudier

2018 Escape Through The Movies (Escape adventure) Andrew Moskos, Pep Rosenfeld, Toan Mai (TMPRo), Rick Bon (Props), Sacha Hoedemaker (music), Emil Struijker-Boudier, Jenna Koda,

2018 Bango! Tamar Broadbent, Rhys Collier, Karel Ebergen, Cene Hale, Lizz (Biddy) Kemery, Simon Lukacs, Sacha Hoedemaker, Emil Struijker-Boudier, Andrew Moskos, Michael Orton-Toliver + Tyrone Dierksen

2018 Boom Chicago's 25th Anniversary Show at Carre Lolu Ajayi, Rob AndristPlourde, Ryan Archibald, Ike Barinholtz, Suzi Barrett, Hilary Bauman, Jill Benjamin, Dave Buckman, Liz Cackowski, Heather Campbell, Kristi Casey, Horace Cohen, Rhys Colliers, Michael Diederich, Tyrone Dierksen, Lauren Dowden, Gwendolyn Druyor, Colton Dunn, Karel Ebergen, Lauren Flans, Woody Fu, Pete Grosz, Cene Hale, Sacha Hoedemaker, Brendan Hunt, Brian Jack, Lisa Jolley, Matt Jones, Lizz (Biddy) Kemery, Jessica Lowe, Simon Lukacs, Drew DiFonzo Marks, Ruben van de Meer, Andrew Moskos, Neil McNamara, Josh Meyers, Seth Meyers, Ryan Millar, Rachel Miller, Marcy Minton, Jethro Nolen Kristy Nolen, Josie O'Reilly, Mike Orton-Toliver, Ian Owens, Pep Rosenfeld, Amber Ruffin, Greg Shapiro, Dani Sher, Jon Shickendans, Emil Struijker-Boudier, Andel Sudik, Sam Super, Holly Walker, Jamie Wright.

Plus the Extended Boom family: Tijl Beckland, Jelka van Houten, Arjen Lubach, Ruben Nicolai, Wilko Terwijn. (Ruben and Horace are in the other list!)

2019 The Future is Here... And it is Slightly Annoying Tamar Broadbent, Dave Buckman, Tyler Groce, Lizz Kemery, Simon Feilder, Simon Lukacs, Sid Singh, Andrew Moskos, Sacha Hoedemaker, Tom Clutterbuck, Emil Struijker-Boudier

2020 Sitcom Matt Castellvi, Simon Feilder, Simon Lukacs, Biddy (Lizz) Kemery, Stacey Smith, Sacha Hoedemaker, Emil Struijker-Boudier. Directed by Andrew Moskos.

2021 Boom Chicago Comedy Festival Year One Arjen Lubach, Seth Meyers, Jordan Peele, Brendan Hunt, Shantira Jackson, Matt Castellvi, Simon Feilder, Simon Lukacs, Biddy (Lizz) Kemery, Stacey Smith, Andrew Moskos, Sacha Hoedemaker, Kay Cannon, Colton Dunn, Ike Barinholtz, Josh Meyers and others. Directed by Stacey Smith.

2022 Boom Chicago into the Metaverse: Meta Luck Next Time Matt Castellvi, Simon Lukacs, Terrance Lamonte Jr., Katie Nixon, Stacey Smith, Sacha Hoedemaker, Emil Struijker-Boudier, Andrew Moskos + Simon Feilder. Directed by Sam Super.

2023 Tragedy + Time = Comedy Matt Castellvi, Louie Cordon, Simon Lukacs, Katie Nixon, Raquel Palmas, Stacey Smith, Sacha Hoedemaker, Emil Struijker-Boudier, Andrew Moskos. + Simon Feilder. Directed by Simon Lukacs.

2023 Amsterdam Roasted Matt Castellvi, Louie Cordon, Katie Nixon, Raquel Palmas, Stacey Smith, Sacha Hoedemaker, Emil Struijker-Boudier, Andrew Moskos. Directed by Ryan Archibald.

2024 The Good, The Bad, and The Algorithm Matt Castellvi, Andrew McCammon, Erin Island, Katie Nixon, Raquel Palmas, Sacha Hoedemaker, and Emil Struijker-Boudier. Directed by Andrew Moskos.

2024 Pep and Greg Politically Incorrect Pep Rosenfeld and Greg Shapiro, Emil Struijker-Boudier.

2025 The Good, The Bad and The Algorithm 2.0 Meg Buzza, Matt Castellvi, Simon Lukacs, Deshawn Mason, Laura Maynard, Katie Nixon, Sacha Hoedemaker, and Emil Struijker-Boudier. Directed by Andrew Moskos.

2026 Sweet Home Amsterdamma Meg Buzza, Simon Lukacs, Deshawn Mason, Laura Maynard, Katie Nixon and Emil Struijker-Boudier.+ Jules Dekker. Directed by and music by Brad Kemp.

== See also ==
- Improvisational comedy
- List of improvisational theatre companies
- Comedy
