= Simon Feilder =

British comedian and actor

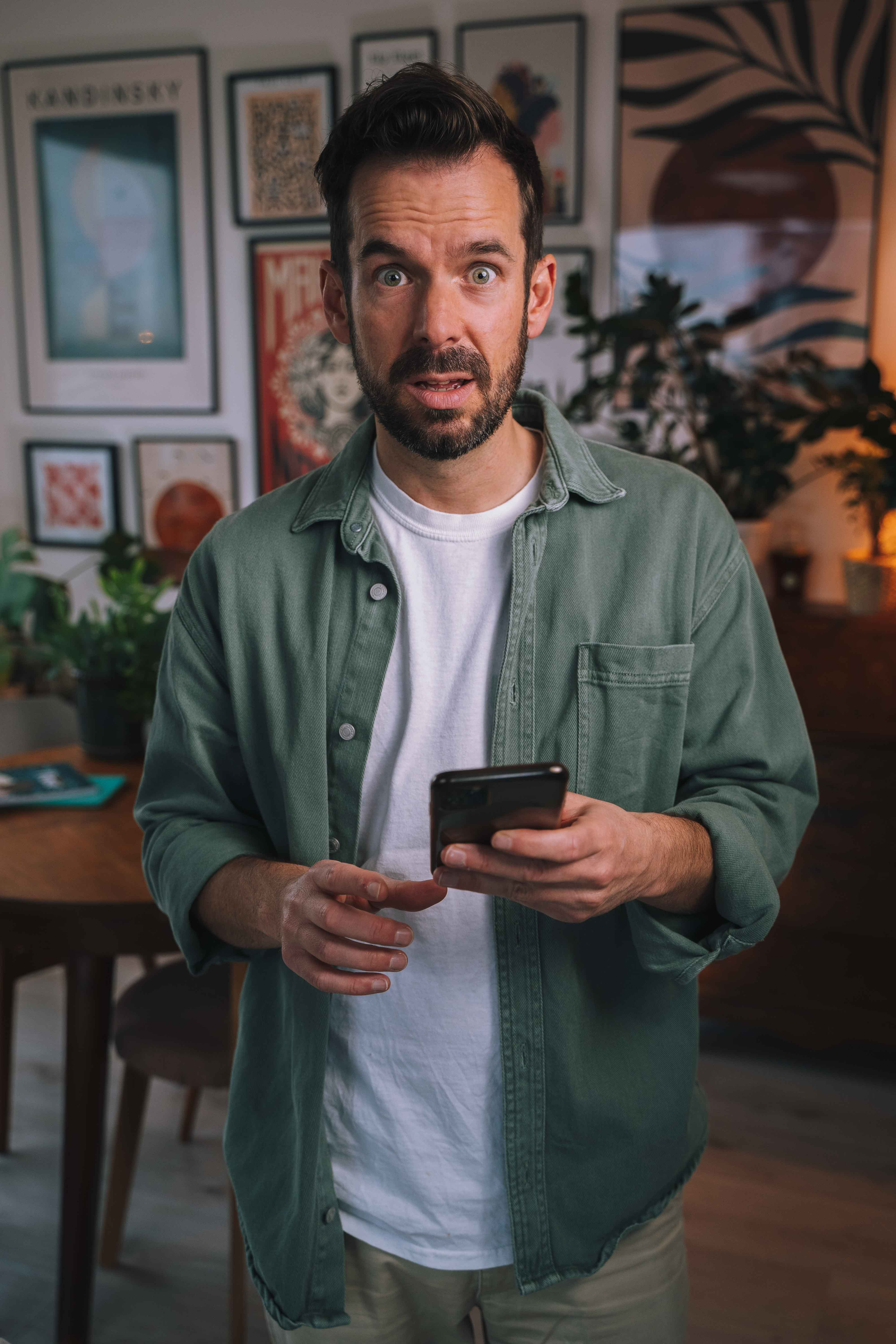
- Occupations: Comedian, actor, presenter, content creator
- Years active: 2001-Present
- Website: http://www.simonfeilder.com

Simon Geoffrey Feilder is a British comedian, actor, voice artist and content creator. A former weather presenter/ VT reporter on The Big Breakfast, and voice over artist in children's television shows, Feilder shifted to a career in stand-up and improv comedy, later cast at Amsterdam's Boom Chicago comedy theatre.

Since 2023 Feilder has been located in Mumbai, appearing in Hindi film and television projects such as Jigra and Freedom at Midnight. and Happy Patel: Khatarnak Jasoos.

== Career ==
In 2001 Feilder entered a talent contest on Channel 4's The Big Breakfast called 'Find Me A Weather Presenter' which he eventually won and became the face of breakfast TV meteorology

From 2006 to 2008 he voiced the character Nobby in Wish Films children's TV show Jim Jam & Sunny alongside Justin Fletcher and Bob Golding. Following that he voiced the characters of Plex and Brobee in the UK dub of award-winning show Yo Gabba Gabba.

In his capacity as a stand-up comedian, Feilder was a finalist in The Laughing Horse New Act of the Year, Amused Moose Comedy Awards and a Semi-Finalist in the BBC New Comedy Awards.

Between 2009 and 2016 Feilder mounted five shows at the Edinburgh Fringe festival:

- Life of Si - with Sy Thomas
- Life of Si: Si Harder - the follow-up
- AAA Stand-Up - A triple-hander package show selected by comedy promotor Bound & Gagged, featuring Feilder along with Joe Rowntree and Pat Burtscher
- All The Things I'm Not - His debut solo show
- Die Trying - 2nd solo show loosely based on his YouTube series of the same name

In 2010 Feilder and Sy Thomas also appeared at the inaugural Hollywood Fringe festival as part of 'The British Invasion' where they were awarded Best Comedy

In 2014 Feilder was the co-host of the Ellie Taylor Show on Fubar Radio. He would later support Taylor on several of her solo stand-up tours.

Re-united with Sy Thomas, in 2016-2017 the pair produced a series of comedy videos for kids' comic The Beano, under the banner of 'Simon & Simon's Guide To...'

In 2018 he wrote and acted in the short film 'Renaissance', which was directed by Ben Mallaby and selected for Encounters Film Festival and the Harlem Hip-Hop Film Festival among others.

In 2018 Feilder joined the cast of Amsterdam's Boom Chicago comedy theatre where he created and performed in numerous improv, sketch and musical shows, shared stages with Brendan Hunt, Arjen Lubach, Jason Sudeikis and the mayor of Amsterdam Famke Halseme

In 2021 Feilder started a podcast dedicated to (DTV) action movies called Dodge This where he and comedian friend Matthew Highton would talk about international and niche action movies. In later episodes Simon is joined by other comedians and film-makers and occasionally interviews up-and-coming action directors such as James Nunn and Will Gilbey.

In 2022 Feilder appeared in the Dutch nostalgic reboot movie Costa!

In 2024 he appeared in the Bollywood movie JIGRA alongside Alia Bhatt and the TV series Freedom At Midnight.
