= Dan Oster =

American actor and comedian (born 1981)

- Born: October 12, 1981 (age 44); Los Angeles, California, U.S.
- Occupations: Actor, comedian
- Years active: 2000–present
- Website: http://www.danoster.com

Daniel Wheatley Oster (born October 12, 1981) is an American actor and comedian. He is most famous for being a member of Boom Chicago and his work as cast member of the FOX late-night sketch comedy series MADtv.

== Early years ==
Oster was born in Los Angeles, California. Prior to his comedy career, Oster was a Universal Studios tour guide and a karaoke jockey. He first discovered his love for improv during his senior year of high school, when his girlfriend at the time took him to see his first live improv show. Upon learning the troupe responsible for the show, Ultimate Improv, was offering paid workshops to foot the bill for their theater space, Dan decided to take the plunge and sign-up. This led to an impressive five-year tenure with the Ultimate Improv, which ended when Oster joined Boom Chicago in July 2005.

== Boom Chicago ==
During his time with Boom Chicago, Dan co-wrote and performed in one of the troupe's biggest hit shows to date: "Me, MySpace and iPod". This send-up of the digital age was hailed by many critics as "the best Boom Chicago show ever" in addition to becoming the longest-running show in the theater's 15-year history. Between major productions, Oster found himself trying a bit of everything by way of his fearless stage persona, from jokingly discussing penile inadequacy to performing freestyle raps as obscure pop culture icons like Paul Reiser and Cobra Commander from G.I. Joe. Outside the Boom theater, one of Dan's most noteworthy pre-MADtv gigs came in the form of a 30-minute mockumentary-style television program entitled "The Digital Difference".

== MADtv ==
Oster joined the cast of MADtv in 2007, as a featured performer, for the thirteenth season (2007-2008 season), which, like most scripted shows of the time, was cut short due to the Writer's Guild of American strike spanning from late 2007 to early 2008. He made his debut on the show on November 24, 2007, which was filmed prior to the strike halting production. Oster is the fifth MADtv cast member to have been a member of Boom Chicago, joining former cast members Ike Barinholtz, Josh Meyers, Nicole Parker, and Jordan Peele.

=== Impressions (on MADtv) ===
- Kiefer Sutherland (as his character, Jack Bauer, from the FOX thriller, 24)
- Matthew McConaughey
- Michael Cera (as Paulie Bleeker from the movie Juno)
- Jeff Conaway
- Mark McGrath
- Roger Clemens
- Mark L. Walberg
- Eric Violette (the guitar-playing spokesman for the FreeCreditReport.com commercials)
- Ryan Seacrest
- Jamie Spears (Britney and Jamie Lynn's father)
- Bill Cosby

=== Impressions (on Oster's YouTube character reels and sketches) ===
- John McCain
- Joe Biden
- Bruce Springsteen
- Tobey Maguire
- James Hetfield
- Owen Wilson
- Fred Schneider
- Prince
- Johnny Cash
- Andy Samberg
- Alec Baldwin
- Marlon Brando
- Gary Sinise
- Sean Connery
- Paul Reiser
- Dane Cook
- Josh Hartnett
- Al Gore
- Seth Rogen
- George Takei
- Gary Busey
- Steve Buscemi
- Sam Waterston
- Jeff Bridges
- Michael Rapaport
- Sam Elliott
- Alan Rickman
- Barack Obama
- Patrick Warburton

== Titled Sketch Project ==
In September 2010, Oster launched the sketch comedy website "Titled Sketch Project", featuring independent material created by writers and actors from MADtv, The Colbert Report, the Groundlings, and Boom Chicago. The cast includes Oster himself as well as Jen Burton, Laurel Coppock, Lauren Flans, Will Maier, and Bobby Mort. This same team also performs live comedy shows in Los Angeles as "Jerk Circus".

=== Impressions (on Titled Sketch Project) ===
- Michael Hogan (as his character, Saul Tigh, from the Syfy series, Battlestar Galactica)
- Philip Seymour Hoffman
- John C. Reilly
- Patrick Stewart
- Jeff Bridges
