= The Revolting World of Stanley Brown =

- Genre: Sitcom
- Starring: Dean-Charles Chapman; Rhyanna Alexander-Davis; Louis Demosthenous; Nicola Duffell; Sy Thomas; Nell Williams
- Country of origin: United Kingdom
- No. of series: 1
- No. of episodes: 13

Production
- Running time: 30 minutes
- Production company: Retort Productions

Original release
- Network: CBBC
- Release: 21 September – 14 December 2012

The Revolting World of Stanley Brown is a science-based British sitcom produced by CBBC and aired on the CBBC channel. The series follows 13-year-old Stanley Brown, who shares his insatiable curiosity about the revolting world around him with a chaotic time-traveller, Archie, and his best friends, Mike and Jess. Stanley is always in trouble but each week, he finds a new and exciting way to come out on top, delighting in the mess and mayhem the world throws at him. The series is produced by Retort Productions.

== Premise ==
Stanley Brown is a normal but unusually curious kid, until his world changes in a way he least expects – with the arrival of his great, great, great, great, great, great... grandson, Archie. Archie has travelled back from the future to spend some time with his hero forefather, using technology destined to be invented by ideas initiated by Stanley and his descendants.

According to Archie (and his super computer, Olivia), Stanley's brilliant insights are what make him special – his curiosity, his ability to make connections, to experiment, evaluate, and persist in finding a solution where other people would give up.

In fact, according to Archie, Stanley Brown was a genius who kick started loads of advancements and inventions for future generations. Archie arrived to witness first hand, observe, and learn from Stanley Brown.

Unfortunately, no one but Stanley can see or hear Archie, so there's no one but Archie who seems to understand or care what an amazing mind Stanley has. At the moment, nobody shares Archie's belief in Stanley – certainly not his mum or sister Steph, who both wish Stan was a little more 'average' and a lot less trouble.

Archie uses reality-bending powers to show us the unseen world around us in microscopic detail, covering a broad spectrum of content from human biology to physics via explosive chemistry and gory zoology. Together, the two of them open our eyes to the wonders of science – but often misjudge the impact of their experiments, as an explosion of science, comedy and chaos unfolds.

Archie's arrival may make Stanley's life a lot more complex, but it's a lot more fun too – even if he still has to cope with his mum's constant cleaning, as well as Jess the street-smart and confrontational girl next door, and having to look out for his accident-prone friend Mike. Stanley Brown has a lot on his plate, but if anyone can cope with the arrival of a back-packing time-travelling tourist, Stanley can!

== Cast and characters ==
- Stanley Brown (Dean-Charles Chapman) – Stanley is the main character of the series. He is naturally inquisitive and into comics, gadgets, and computer games, and often questions how something works. He is a born leader, always at the centre of his gang of friends, able to look after himself and others. With a natural understanding of appliances he can operate the cooker, washer, dryer, and his mother's various gadgets better than anyone – but she has had to ban him from taking anything apart after losing count of household gadgets he 'seconded' and 'adapted' for his experiments. Depending what Archie is up to, Stanley often appears to friends and family to be distracted: daydreaming, inconsiderate, clumsy, talking to himself, forgetful, absent-minded or never where he should be. He struggles to live with the thought that one day he will become the greatest scientist ever, and sometimes wants to be a normal thirteen-year-old.
- Jessica "Jess" Palmer (Nell Williams) – Jess is Stanley's next-door neighbour. She is unashamedly different, cunning, deadpan, witty and street-smart. She is intrigued by Stanley's creative experiments, as well as his odd behaviour. At first, she regards Mike with pity and scorn, but comes to appreciate his loyalty and gutsiness. She soon forms a solid 'gang of three' with Stanley and Mike, often turning up unannounced in the shed or on Stan's doorstep.
- Mike (Louis Demosthenous) – Mike is Stanley's best friend. He is considered a weakling but is extremely loyal to his friend. Despite his physical limitations, Mike is determined to 'be the best' and become a soldier when he grows up, hence the fact he constantly references his involvement in the Junior Marines.
- Stephanie "Steph" Brown (Nicola Duffell) – Steph is Stanley's older sister. She is an outwardly well-behaved teenager but behind her mum's back, she takes delight in winding Stanley up. As far as Stanley is concerned, Steph annoyingly manages to 'side-step' the rules and take advantage of her first-born status.
- Archie (Sy Thomas) – Archie is Stanley's great, great, great, great, great, great grandson from the future, having travelled back in time to observe and learn from his ancestor's legendary curiosity and love of disgusting novelty. He insists on not being Stanley's imaginary friend despite what his mother thinks. He considers himself to be Stanley's number one fan and in awe of his great ancestor. To Archie, visiting Stanley is like visiting a 'young Einstein' in the early years. But the reason he really wants to spend time with Stanley is because Archie is the first in his family not to carry the family brilliance that began with Stanley Brown. Thoughts and ideas bounce round Archie's head constantly, but he can only create problems, not solve them. Archie knows this, and believes that spending time with Stanley will teach him to be a 'proper' Brown, deserving of the family name. Only Stanley can see or hear Archie, as he uses OLIVIA, his super computer, to keep himself invisible to everyone else. Archie is shown as flamboyant, witty and energetic, with no social or personal inhibitions.
- OLIVIA (Jocelyn Jee Esien) – OLIVIA is Archie's sentient mobile super computer. OLIVIA stands for Open Link Infinitely Variable Interactive Apparatus.
- Daniel Palmer (Jaques Miché) – Daniel is Jess's older brother, and who Steph is besotted by. Daniel likes to think of himself as Mr. Popular, and assumes that others aspire to be just like him. Unlike his thick-skinned sister Jess, he's sensitive, and easily wounded by petty insults, especially if it has anything to do with his appearance.
- Daisy (Rhyanna Alexander-Davies) – Daisy is Steph's best friend. Steph doesn't treat her very well, but Daisy doesn't seem to mind, often causing problems by her misunderstanding of simple instructions. She has a heart of gold and is always eager to please, although her honesty often gets in her in trouble, as she tells Steph things about her appearance that she doesn't want to hear.
- Amanda Brown (Juliet Cowan) – Amanda is Stanley and Steph's mum. She runs her business selling beauty products door-to-door and takes pride in her appearance and home.

== Episodes ==
No.	Title	Original release date	Viewers
1	"Snot"	21 September 2012	200,000
The Brown family move to their new home after having to leave their last one because Stanley used it for one of his disgusting experiments. He's promised his mum that there will be no more exploding bogey balls, slug discos or any other revolting experiments but as the new neighbours arrive, there is a rather nasty surprise in store.
2	"Gut Instinct"	28 September 2012	150,000
Stanley and Steph lock horns as they both want a lift from mum to go out but she cannot take them both. A plate of egg sandwiches proves to be his unlikely saviour.
3	"Pain in the Leg"	5 October 2012	192,000
Mike has an accident while testing Stanley's new invention, the 'Dizzybuster'. Stanley is forced to take Mike's place and become a junior marine; all is fine until General Crawford turns up to put Stanley through his paces. Mum's bad breath and a big juicy pimple help save the day.
4	"Night of the Living Virus"	12 October 2012	179,000
Stanley is making the most revolting film ever, but first, he must find a leading lady. Daisy turns out to have unexpected talents although it soon becomes obvious that she isn't actually acting. Steph thinks she should be the leading lady and will stop at nothing to get the part, as far as she's concerned since when has lack of acting ability talent ever been a problem?
5	"Spider"	19 October 2012	172,000
Stanley's things keep going missing, but who is the thief? It gets worse when Jess' tarantula also goes missing. The pressure's on to find the culprit and save Jess' spider before Stanley's mum spots it. A ghostly sleepover uncovers the culprit.
6	"Stanley the Time Waster"	26 October 2012	183,000
Archie is worried Stanley seems to have lost his mojo – he's stopped coming up with revolting experiments! Archie panics and tells a little white lie, resulting in Stanley no longer sleeping, eating and worse of all washing! Meanwhile, Stanley's sister Steph ditches best mate Daisy and starts dressing like a scientist to impress heartthrob Daniel... but Daisy won't be dropped that easily.
7	"Stonecold Stanley"	2 November 2012	296,000
Jess is in serious trouble. Stanley and Mike want to help but Jess won't tell them what she's done. Things get more mysterious when she and Steph start becoming best buddies. Mum's arranged a dinner party and Stanley has to make sure it happens without a hitch but why are Jess and Steph so intent on ruining it? Stanley doesn't know what's going on but all he knows is that he's got make sure the dinner party goes ahead!
8	"Scab Hunters"	9 November 2012	229,000
It's a battle of the scabs – Stanley verses arch-rival Geekboy2000. Stanley needs only one more gruesome scab to finish his ultimate collection and beat his rival to the honour of the best scab collection ever. The only trouble is the scab in question is attached to his sister Steph's arm! Stanley has just one day to retrieve it – the scab hunt is on!
9	"Smells Like Teen Spirit"	16 November 2012	139,000
Stanley's mum is launching her new aftershave, 'Demolition – for Men' and she wants everything to be perfect. She gives Stanley a stern warning that nothing can go wrong but Stanley has other things on his mind – he fears his beloved shed is about to be knocked down! As the 'Demolition' men arrive, Stanley, Jess and Mike get prepared for battle and defend the shed!
10	"Lovebug"	23 November 2012	227,000
Love is in the air for Stanley and Mike when a mysterious girl turns up and distracts them from his new exploding volcano invention... but who is she and why has she appeared now? With Stanley and Mike's attention diverted, it is left to Jess to solve the mystery.
11	"Wax"	30 November 2012	241,000
Archie keeps ruining Stanley's revolting experiments and something needs to be done about it. When eccentric Aunty Amy, just back from the jungle, makes a surprise visit, Stanley thinks he may have found his solution. At the same time, Steph is trying to impress the most popular girl at school but for once has to turn to Stanley for help... who knew that his earwax could be so useful!
12	"Hiccupalypse"	7 December 2012	192,000
Stanley's neighbour, Jess, claims that she can burp the loudest. Not one to be out-done, Stanley builds a machine (the 'Juicinator') to help him create the loudest burp ever. His plans are interrupted when local news reporter Sarah Stripe arrives looking for 'local hero' Mike.
13	"Archie Gets Busted!"	14 December 2012	305,000
Archie travels back to the future to graduate from school but must first convince the mysterious headmaster that he has given up time travelling. This is a clip show which looks back on the series.
