= Sy Thomas =

British actor and comedian (born 1979)

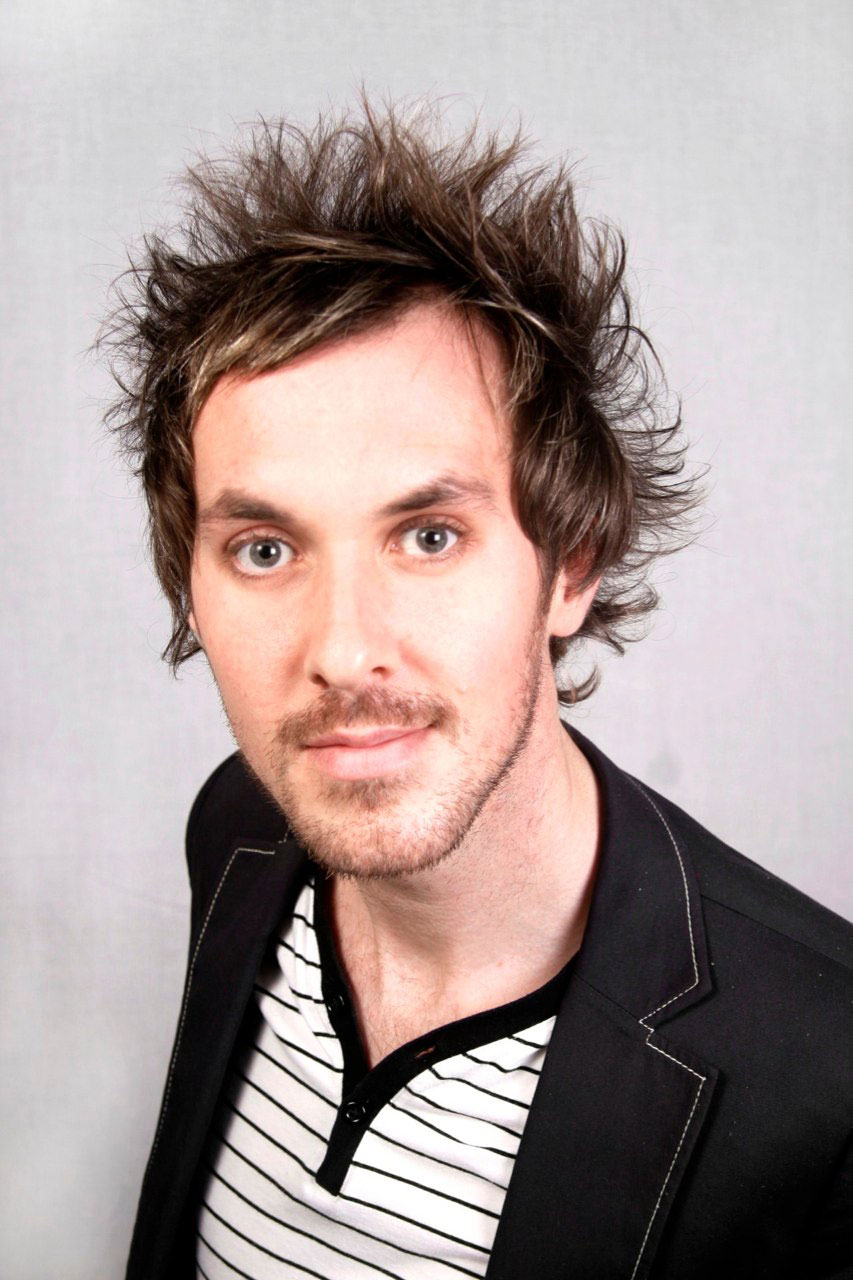
- Sy Thomas in a publicity still from his website.
- Born: 24 August 1979 (age 46); High Wycombe, Buckinghamshire, England, UK
- Occupation(s): Television personality, standup comedian, actor
- Known for: TV presenting
- Website: www.sythomas.com

Simon George Thomas (born 24 August 1979 in High Wycombe, Buckinghamshire) is a British TV presenter, stand-up comedian and actor.

== Early years and career ==
Thomas attended Aberystwyth University, Wales, where he studied drama from 1998 to 2001 and received a BA upper second.

In 2005, Thomas took part in a documentary film with Alexis Dubus about the Plymouth to Banjul Challenge. The project involved buying a car for £100 and attempting to drive it 4,000 miles through seven countries and the Sahara Desert before auctioning it off for local charities in the Gambia. He has referred to this as a life-changing experience.

In 2006 he started presenting comedy characters on Nickelodeon which led to a full presenting role on ME:TV and the UK Kids' Choice Awards in 2007.

Thomas is a regular performer at the Edinburgh Festival Fringe with his comedy partner Simon Feilder. Their 'Life Of Si' shows spun off from a series of YouTube videos made when they lived in the same London flat.

Thomas appeared in a viral Vodafone campaign alongside Lewis Hamilton

He was the lead presenter on the first two series of the TV programme The Cool Stuff Collective by Archie Productions on ITV.

In June 2011, Thomas began demonstrating products from the Argos catalogue, such as backpacks and camcorders, on home shopping channel Argos TV.

From September 2012, Thomas has starred as Archie in the CBBC sitcom The Revolting World of Stanley Brown.

Since 2021 Sy has been on Twitch https://www.twitch.tv/sythomascomedy

According to Sy in his stream he said he wouldn't do "I'm a celebrity, get me out of here" because he would be known as the guy who ate a bollock. At 1h59m30s on Twitch Video
