= The Cool Stuff Collective =

- Genre: Children's
- Starring: Sy Thomas; Vicky Letch; The Blowfish
- Country of origin: United Kingdom
- Original language: English
- No. of series: 3
- No. of episodes: 39

Production
- Running time: 30mins
- Production company: Archie Productions

Original release
- Network: ITV (CITV)
- Release: 13 September 2010 – 24 December 2011

The Cool Stuff Collective is a British children's television programme, which was produced for three series that aired on ITV and CITV respectively from 13 September 2010 to 24 December 2011. The show featured reviews of the latest and forthcoming video games, gadgets, films and music. CITV also broadcast a similar format programme called "Play The Game" in 2004. Sy Thomas presented the programme for the majority of its run, with Vicky Letch and The Blowfish later taking over for the final series. Each episode primary school aged children, known as the cool stuff committee, would review a range of pop culture items.

== Presenters ==
- Sy Thomas (2010–11)
- Vicky Letch (2011)
- Tom "The Blowfish" Hird (2011)

== Controversy ==
In 2011, the programme was found to have breached Ofcom's rules on product placement. Ofcom stated that many of the items featured on the show ended with "overt encouragements" to consider purchase of the product.

== Transmissions ==
| Series | Episodes | Originally released | |
| Series | Episodes | First released | Last released |
|---|---|---|---|
| 1 | 14 | 13 September 2010 | 13 December 2010 |
| 2 | 14 | 29 January 2011 | 30 April 2011 |
| 3 | 11 | 15 October 2011 | 24 December 2011 |
